= Women's foil at the 2014 World Fencing Championships =

- Venue: Kazan Tennis Academy
- Location: Kazan, Russia
- Dates: 19 July

Medalists
gold medal	Arianna Errigo	Italy
silver medal	Martina Batini	Italy
bronze medal	Valentina Vezzali	Italy
bronze medal	Inès Boubakri	Tunisia

The Women's foil event of the 2014 World Fencing Championships was held on 19 July 2014. A qualification was held on 16 July.

== Draw ==
=== Finals ===
Semi-finals
(Italy) Martina Batini	15
(Tunisia) Inès Boubakri	12
(Italy) Valentina Vezzali	10
(Italy) Arianna Errigo	15

Final
(Italy) Martina Batini	7
(Italy) Arianna Errigo	15

=== Top half ===
==== Section 1 ====
Round of 64
1	(Italy) Elisa Di Francisca	15
64	(Egypt) Eman Shaaban	14
33	(France) Corinne Maîtrejean	15
32	(Poland) Małgorzata Wojtkowiak	12
17	(China) Liu Yongshi	15
48	(Japan) Haruka Yanaoka	11
49	(Argentina) Flavia Mormandi	8
16	(China) Le Huilin	15
9	(South Korea) Jeon Hee-sook	15
56	(Brazil) Ana Bulcão	6
41	(Germany) Katja Wächter	15
24	(Poland) Martyna Synoradzka	6
25	(Colombia) Saskia Loretta van Erven Garcia	15
40	(Japan) Shiho Nishioka	12
57	(Singapore) Wong Cheryl Ye Han	7
8	(Italy) Martina Batini	15

Round of 32
1	(Italy) Elisa Di Francisca	15
33	(France) Corinne Maîtrejean	8
17	(China) Liu Yongshi	10
16	(China) Le Huilin	15
9	(South Korea) Jeon Hee-sook	13
41	(Germany) Katja Wächter	15
25	(Colombia) Saskia Loretta van Erven Garcia	8
8	(Italy) Martina Batini	15

Round of 16
1	(Italy) Elisa Di Francisca	15
16	(China) Le Huilin	5
41	(Germany) Katja Wächter	3
8	(Italy) Martina Batini	15

Quarterfinals
1	(Italy) Elisa Di Francisca	6
8	(Italy) Martina Batini	15

==== Section 2 ====
Round of 64
5	(Tunisia) Inès Boubakri	15
60	(Mexico) Nataly Michel	9
37	(Hungary) Szilvia Jeszenszky	4
28	(United Kingdom) Natalia Sheppard	15
21	(China) Chen Bingbing	15
44	(Czech Republic) Andrea Bímová	7
53	(Australia) Margarita Sokolovskaja	3
12	(France) Ysaora Thibus	15
13	(South Korea) Nam Hyun-hee	6
52	(South Korea) Kim Mi-na	15
45	(China) Wang Chen	15
20	(Hungary) Edina Knapek	12
29	(Venezuela) Yulitza Suarez	6
36	(Ukraine) Olha Leleiko	15
61	(Canada) Eleanor Harvey	9
4	(Russia) Inna Deriglazova	13

Round of 32
5	(Tunisia) Inès Boubakri	15
28	(United Kingdom) Natalia Sheppard	4
21	(China) Chen Bingbing	14
12	(France) Ysaora Thibus	15
52	(South Korea) Kim Mi-na	15
45	(China) Wang Chen	11
36	(Ukraine) Olha Leleiko	15
4	(Russia) Inna Deriglazova	8

Round of 16
5	(Tunisia) Inès Boubakri	15
12	(France) Ysaora Thibus	14
52	(South Korea) Kim Mi-na	13
36	(Ukraine) Olha Leleiko	15

Quarterfinals
5	(Tunisia) Inès Boubakri	13
36	(Ukraine) Olha Leleiko	12

=== Bottom half ===
==== Section 3 ====
Round of 64
3	(Italy) Valentina Vezzali	15
62	(Mexico) Adriana Camacho	6
35	(United States) Nicole Ross	15
30	(Poland) Karolina Chlewińska	10
19	(South Korea) Oh Ha-na	15
46	(Thailand) Nunta Chantasuvannasin	7
51	(Brazil) Mariana Daffner	5
14	(Russia) Diana Yakovleva	15
11	(United States) Lee Kiefer	15
54	(Singapore) Wang Wenying	4
43	(Hungary) Fanny Kreiss	4
22	(France) Astrid Guyart	15
27	(Ukraine) Alexandra Sinyta	5
38	(Germany) Anne Sauer	12
59	(Canada) Kelleigh Ryan	15
6	(Germany) Carolin Golubytskyi	11

Round of 32
3	(Italy) Valentina Vezzali	15
35	(United States) Nicole Ross	8
35	(South Korea) Oh Ha-na	15
14	(Russia) Diana Yakovleva	13
11	(United States) Lee Kiefer	15
22	(France) Astrid Guyart	10
38	(Germany) Anne Sauer	15
59	(Canada) Kelleigh Ryan	13

Round of 16
3	(Italy) Valentina Vezzali	12
19	(South Korea) Oh Ha-na	9
11	(United States) Lee Kiefer	15
38	(Germany) Anne Sauer	9

Quarterfinals
3	(Italy) Valentina Vezzali	15
11	(United States) Lee Kiefer	13

==== Section 4 ====
Round of 64
7	(Russia) Larisa Korobeynikova	15
58	(Canada) Alanna Goldie	5
39	(Japan) Karin Miyawaki	15
26	(Ukraine) Kateryna Chentsova	14
23	(France) Gaëlle Gebet	9
42	(Poland) Magdalena Knop	15
55	(Canada) Shannon Comerford	8
10	(United States) Nzingha Prescod	15
15	(Russia) Yuliya Biryukova	15
50	(Hong Kong) Liu Yan Wai	9
47	(Venezuela) Liz Rivero	3
18	(United States) Margaret Lu	15
31	(Germany) Sandra Bingenheimer	14
34	(Hungary) Gabriella Varga	15
63	(Brazil) Tais Rochel	11
2	(Italy) Arianna Errigo	15

Round of 32
7	(Russia) Larisa Korobeynikova	15
39	(Japan) Karin Miyawaki	9
42	(Poland) Magdalena Knop	15
10	(United States) Nzingha Prescod	8
15	(Russia) Yuliya Biryukova	15
18	(United States) Margaret Lu	8
34	(Hungary) Gabriella Varga	3
2	(Italy) Arianna Errigo	15

Round of 16
7	(Russia) Larisa Korobeynikova	10
42	(Poland) Magdalena Knop	15
15	(Russia) Yuliya Biryukova	10
2	(Italy) Arianna Errigo	15

Quarterfinals
42	(Poland) Magdalena Knop	6
2	(Italy) Arianna Errigo	15

== Final classification ==
Rank	Athlete	Nation
1st place, gold medalist(s)	Arianna Errigo	Italy
2nd place, silver medalist(s)	Martina Batini	Italy
3rd place, bronze medalist(s)	Valentina Vezzali	Italy
3rd place, bronze medalist(s)	Inès Boubakri	Tunisia
5	Elisa Di Francisca	Italy
6	Lee Kiefer	United States
7	Olha Leleiko	Ukraine
8	Magdalena Knop	Poland
9	Larisa Korobeynikova	Russia
10	Ysaora Thibus	France
11	Yulia Biryukova	Russia
12	Le Huilin	China
13	Oh Ha-na	South Korea
14	Anne Sauer	Germany
15	Katja Wächter	Germany
16	Kim Mi-na	South Korea
17	Inna Deriglazova	Russia
18	Jeon Hee-sook	South Korea
19	Nzingha Prescod	United States
20	Diana Yakovleva	Russia
21	Lu Yongshi	China
22	Margaret Lu	United States
23	Chen Binbing	China
24	Astrid Guyart	Hong Kong
25	Saskia Loretta van Erven Garcia	Colombia
26	Natalia Sheppard	Great Britain
27	Corinne Maitrejean	France
28	Gabriella Varga	Hungary
29	Nicole Ross	United States
30	Karin Miyawaki	Japan
31	Wang Chen	China
32	Kelleigh Ryan	Canada
33	Carolin Golubytskyi	Germany
34	Nam Hyun-hee	South Korea
35	Edina Knapek	Hungary
36	Gaëlle Gebet	France
37	Martyna Synoradzka	Poland
38	Kateryna Chentsova	Ukraine
39	Alexandra Sinyta	Ukraine
40	Yulitza Suarez	Venezuela
41	Karolina Chlewińska	Poland
42	Sandra Bingenheimer	Germany
43	Małgorzata Wojtkowiak	Poland
44	Szilvia Jeszenszky	Poland
45	Nishioka Shiho	Japan
46	Fanny Kreiss	Hungary
47	Andrea Bímová	Czech Republic
48	Nunta Chantasuvannasin	India
49	Liz Rivero	Venezuela
50	Haruka Yanaoka	Japan
51	Flavia Mormandi	Argentina
52	Liu Yan Wai	China
53	Mariana Daffner	Brazil
54	Margarita Sokolovskaja	Australia
55	Wang Wenying	Singapore
56	Shannon Comerford	Canada
57	Ana Bulcão	Brazil
58	Wong Cheryl Ye Han	Singapore
59	Alanna Goldie	Canada
60	Eleanor Harvey	Canada
61	Nataly Michel	Mexico
62	Adriana Camacho	Mexico
63	Taís Rochel	Brazil
64	Eman Shaaban	Egypt
