= Women's foil at the 2023 World Fencing Championships =

- Venue: Milan Convention Center
- Location: Milan, Italy
- Dates: 23 July (qualification); 26 July (final)
- Competitors: 129 from 45 nations

Medalists
gold medal	Alice Volpi	Italy
silver medal	Arianna Errigo	Italy
bronze medal	Martina Favaretto	Italy
bronze medal	Lee Kiefer	United States

The Women's foil competition at the 2023 World Fencing Championships was held on 26 July 2023. The qualification was held on 23 July.

== Draw ==
=== Finals ===
Semifinals
(Italy) Arianna Errigo	15
(Italy) Martina Favaretto	10
(Italy) Alice Volpi	15
(United States) Lee Kiefer	13

Final
(Italy) Arianna Errigo	10
(Italy) Alice Volpi	15

=== Top half ===
==== Section 1 ====
Round of 64
(France) Ysaora Thibus	15
(Venezuela) Isis Giménez	12
(Japan) Karin Miyawaki	15
(Brazil) Bia Bulcão	2
(Italy) Arianna Errigo	15
(Canada) Yunjia Zhang	6
(Hong Kong) Daphne Chan	15
(China) Chen Qingyuan	12
(Japan) Yuka Ueno	14
(Japan) Sumire Tsuji	5
(Austria) Lilli Maria Brugger	8
(Romania) Mălina Călugăreanu	15
(Egypt) Yara El-Sharkawy	9
(Germany) Leandra Behr	15
(Ivory Coast) Maxine Esteban	8
(Canada) Eleanor Harvey	12

Round of 32
(France) Ysaora Thibus	15
(Japan) Karin Miyawaki	4
(Italy) Arianna Errigo	15
(Hong Kong) Daphne Chan	9
(Japan) Yuka Ueno	11
(Romania) Mălina Călugăreanu	15
(Germany) Leandra Behr	12
(Canada) Eleanor Harvey	10

Round of 16
(France) Ysaora Thibus	10
(Italy) Arianna Errigo	15
(Romania) Mălina Călugăreanu	15
(Germany) Leandra Behr	10

Quarterfinals
(Italy) Arianna Errigo	15
(Romania) Mălina Călugăreanu	2

==== Section 2 ====
Round of 64
(Italy) Martina Favaretto	15
(Greece) Stavroula Garyfallou	6
(Israel) Lior Druck	8
(United Kingdom) Carolina Stutchbury	15
(France) Anita Blaze	15
(Sweden) Miriam Schreiber	10
(France) Morgane Patru	15
(Canada) Jessica Guo	12
(China) Shi Yue	7
(Chile) Arantza Inostroza	15
(Singapore) Amita Berthier	10
(United States) Maia Weintraub	15
(China) Cai Yuanting	15
(South Korea) Hong Hyo-jin	9
(Romania) Andreea Dincă	9
(Japan) Sera Azuma	15

Round of 32
(Italy) Martina Favaretto	15
(United Kingdom) Carolina Stutchbury	13
(France) Anita Blaze	12
(France) Morgane Patru	2
(Chile) Arantza Inostroza	11
(United States) Maia Weintraub	15
(China) Cai Yuanting	9
(Japan) Sera Azuma	15

Round of 16
(Italy) Martina Favaretto	15
(France) Anita Blaze	9
(United States) Maia Weintraub	13
(Japan) Sera Azuma	14

Quarterfinals
(Italy) Martina Favaretto	15
(Japan) Sera Azuma	9

=== Bottom half ===
==== Section 3 ====
Round of 64
(Italy) Alice Volpi	15
(South Korea) Hong Se-na	12
(Denmark) Laeticia Jørgensen	9
(United States) Lauren Scruggs	15
(Austria) Olivia Wolhgemuth	15
(Spain) María Mariño	7
(Uzbekistan) Umida Ilyosova	4
(Poland) Julia Walczyk	15
(Germany) Leonie Ebert	14
(Mexico) Alely Hernández	7
(Hungary) Dóra Lupkovics	8
(China) Huang Qianqian	15
(Israel) Gili Kuritzky	15
(Canada) Sabrina Fang	10
(Hong Kong) Valerie Cheng	10
(Italy) Martina Batini	15

Round of 32
(Italy) Alice Volpi	15
(United States) Lauren Scruggs	14
(Austria) Olivia Wolhgemuth	5
(Poland) Julia Walczyk	15
(Germany) Leonie Ebert	11
(China) Huang Qianqian	12
(Israel) Gili Kuritzky	10
(Italy) Martina Batini	15

Round of 16
(Italy) Alice Volpi	15
(Poland) Julia Walczyk	12
(China) Huang Qianqian	8
(Italy) Martina Batini	15

Quarterfinals
(Italy) Alice Volpi	15
(Italy) Martina Batini	7

==== Section 4 ====
Round of 64
(Germany) Anne Sauer	15
(United Kingdom) Amelie Tsang	4
(Hungary) Kata Kondricz	15
(Hungary) Fanni Kreiss	7
(Hungary) Flóra Pásztor	15
(Romania) Emilia Corbu	9
(Poland) Aleksandra Jeglińska	8
(France) Pauline Ranvier	15
(United States) Jacqueline Dubrovich	15
(Sweden) Ester Schreiber	8
Leyla Pirieva	15
(Poland) Hanna Łyczbińska	13
(Singapore) Maxine Wong	6
(Hong Kong) Sophia Wu	15
(Germany) Aliya Dhuique-Hein	8
(United States) Lee Kiefer	15

Round of 32
(Germany) Anne Sauer	15
(Hungary) Kata Kondricz	8
(Hungary) Flóra Pásztor	6
(France) Pauline Ranvier	15
(United States) Jacqueline Dubrovich	15
Leyla Pirieva	8
(Hong Kong) Sophia Wu	11
(United States) Lee Kiefer	15

Round of 16
(Germany) Anne Sauer	15
(France) Pauline Ranvier	14
(United States) Jacqueline Dubrovich	5
(United States) Lee Kiefer	15

Quarterfinals
(Germany) Anne Sauer	7
(United States) Lee Kiefer	15
