= Women's team foil at the 2018 World Fencing Championships =

- Venue: Wuxi Sports Center Indoor Stadium
- Location: Wuxi, China
- Dates: 25 July; 26 July
- Competitors: 88 from 22 nations

Medalists
gold medal	Lee Kiefer; Margaret Lu; Nzingha Prescod; Nicole Ross	United States
silver medal	Chiara Cini; Arianna Errigo; Camilla Mancini; Alice Volpi	Italy
bronze medal	Anita Blaze; Astrid Guyart; Pauline Ranvier; Ysaora Thibus	France

The Women's team foil event of the 2018 World Fencing Championships was held on 25 and 26 July 2018.

== Draw ==
=== Finals ===
Semifinals
Italy	45
France	29
United States	45
South Korea	22

Final
Italy	35
United States	45
Third place
France	35
South Korea	26

=== Top half ===
==== Section 1 ====
Round of 32
Brazil	w/o
Egypt

Round of 16
Italy	45
Brazil	12
China	31
Japan	45

Quarterfinals
Italy	45
Japan	29

==== Section 2 ====
Round of 32
Philippines	38
Hong Kong	45
Sweden	35
Singapore	36

Round of 16
Germany	45
Hong Kong	21
Singapore	18
France	45

Quarterfinals
Germany	38
France	45

=== Bottom half ===
==== Section 3 ====
Round of 32
Australia	27
Spain	45
Hungary	45
Thailand	19

Round of 16
United States	45
Spain	22
Hungary	39
Canada	44

Quarterfinals
United States	45
Canada	19

==== Section 4 ====
Round of 32
Ukraine	45
Chinese Taipei	30

Round of 16
South Korea	45
Poland	30
Ukraine	26
Russia	45

Quarterfinals
South Korea	40
Russia	38

=== Placement rounds ===
==== 5–8th place bracket ====
5–8th place semifinals
Japan	45
Germany	36
Canada	34
Russia	31

Fifth place
Japan	31
Canada	24
Seventh place
Germany	45
Russia	36

==== 9–16th place bracket ====
9–16th place quarterfinals
Brazil	40
China	45
Hong Kong	45
Singapore	20
Spain	30
Hungary	45
Poland	45
Ukraine	34

9–12th place semifinals
China	45
Hong Kong	36
Hungary	29
Poland	45

Ninth place
China	39
Poland	40
Eleventh place
Hong Kong	20
Hungary	45

==== 13–16th place bracket ====
13–16th place semifinals
Brazil	w/o
Singapore
Spain	44
Ukraine	45

13th place
Brazil	28
Ukraine	45
15th place
Singapore
Spain	w/o
