= Women's foil at the 2025 World Fencing Championships =

- Venue: Olympic Palace
- Location: Tbilisi, Georgia
- Dates: 24 July (preliminaries); 25 July (finals)
- Competitors: 64 from 29 nations

Medalists
gold medal	Lee Kiefer	United States
silver medal	Pauline Ranvier	France
bronze medal	Anna Cristino	Italy
bronze medal	Martina Favaretto	Italy

The Women's foil competition at the 2025 World Fencing Championships was held on 24 and 25 July 2025.

== Draw ==
=== Finals ===
Semifinals
(Italy) Anna Cristino	11
(France) Pauline Ranvier	15
(Italy) Martina Favaretto	10
(United States) Lee Kiefer	15

Final
(France) Pauline Ranvier	4
(United States) Lee Kiefer	15

=== Top half ===
==== Section 1 ====
Round of 64
(Canada) Eleanor Harvey	15
(Kazakhstan) Sofiya Aktayeva	6
(Ukraine) Kristina Petrova	14
Polina Kozaeva	10
(Hong Kong) Daphne Chan	15
(Israel) May Kagan Tyagunov	5
(South Korea) Park Ji-hee	15
(Canada) Yunjia Zhang	14
(United States) Lauren Scruggs	15
(Poland) Martyna Jelińska	12
(Romania) Rebeca Cândescu	15
(Moldova) Maria Cojocari	7
(Hungary) Kata Kondricz	14
(Ukraine) Alina Poloziuk	15
(Sweden) Miriam Schreiber	3
(Italy) Anna Cristino	15

Round of 32
(Canada) Eleanor Harvey	15
(Ukraine) Kristina Petrova	4
(Hong Kong) Daphne Chan	15
(South Korea) Park Ji-hee	8
(United States) Lauren Scruggs	15
(Romania) Rebeca Cândescu	7
(Ukraine) Alina Poloziuk	13
(Italy) Anna Cristino	15

Round of 16
(Canada) Eleanor Harvey	15
(Hong Kong) Daphne Chan	3
(United States) Lauren Scruggs	3
(Italy) Anna Cristino	15

Quarterfinals
(Canada) Eleanor Harvey	8
(Italy) Anna Cristino	10

==== Section 2 ====
Round of 64
(France) Éva Lacheray	15
(Argentina) María Terni	7
(France) Morgane Patru	9
(United States) Emily Jing	15
(Canada) Jessica Guo	14
(Canada) Nadia Hayes	12
(Austria) Lilli Brugger	15
(Japan) Komaki Kikuchi	14
(France) Pauline Ranvier	15
(Egypt) Sara Amr Hossny	8
(Cambodia) Olga Calissi	15
(Spain) Ariadna Tucker	14
Marta Martyanova	15
(China) Huang Qianqian	7
(Brazil) Bia Bulcão	7
(Italy) Arianna Errigo	15

Round of 32
(France) Éva Lacheray	15
(United States) Emily Jing	8
(Canada) Jessica Guo	13
(Austria) Lilli Brugger	7
(France) Pauline Ranvier	15
(Cambodia) Olga Calissi	11
Marta Martyanova	9
(Italy) Arianna Errigo	15

Round of 16
(France) Éva Lacheray	6
(Canada) Jessica Guo	15
(France) Pauline Ranvier	15
(Italy) Arianna Errigo	4

Quarterfinals
(Canada) Jessica Guo	14
(France) Pauline Ranvier	15

=== Bottom half ===
==== Section 3 ====
Round of 64
(Italy) Martina Favaretto	15
(Israel) Lior Druck	5
(Ukraine) Dariia Myroniuk	9
(France) Anita Blaze	15
(China) Jiao Enqi	9
(Ukraine) Olga Sopit	15
(South Korea) Mo Byeol-i	7
(Japan) Sumire Tsuji	15
(Germany) Anne Kleibrink	15
(Tunisia) Nourane B'chir	5
(South Korea) Hong Se-na	15
(Poland) Hanna Łyczbińska	11
(South Korea) Lee Se-joo	12
(Slovakia) Gaia Cantucci	11
(Greece) Aikaterini Kontochristopoulou	9
(Japan) Yuka Ueno	15

Round of 32
(Italy) Martina Favaretto	14
(France) Anita Blaze	9
(Ukraine) Olga Sopit	6
(Japan) Sumire Tsuji	15
(Germany) Anne Kleibrink	12
(South Korea) Hong Se-na	15
(South Korea) Lee Se-joo	6
(Japan) Yuka Ueno	15

Round of 16
(Italy) Martina Favaretto	15
(Japan) Sumire Tsuji	2
(South Korea) Hong Se-na	9
(Japan) Yuka Ueno	15

Quarterfinals
(Italy) Martina Favaretto	15
(Japan) Yuka Ueno	5

==== Section 4 ====
Round of 64
(Hungary) Flóra Pásztor	12
(Germany) Luca Holland-Cunz	15
(Moldova) Adeline Senic	15
(China) Han Xiaoxuan	10
(Greece) Maria Chaldaiou	15
(Germany) Carlotta Morandi	10
(Poland) Karolina Żurawska	12
(Italy) Martina Batini	15
(United States) Jaelyn Liu	14
(Hungary) Erika Nekifor	13
(Spain) María Díaz	5
(United Kingdom) Carolina Stutchbury	15
(Japan) Sera Azuma	15
(Singapore) Cheung Kemei	5
Vitalina Anaschenkova	5
(United States) Lee Kiefer	15

Round of 32
(Germany) Luca Holland-Cunz	15
(Moldova) Adeline Senic	14
(Greece) Maria Chaldaiou	11
(Italy) Martina Batini	15
(United States) Jaelyn Liu	14
(United Kingdom) Carolina Stutchbury	15
(Japan) Sera Azuma	7
(United States) Lee Kiefer	15

Round of 16
(Germany) Luca Holland-Cunz	1
(Italy) Martina Batini	15
(United Kingdom) Carolina Stutchbury	7
(United States) Lee Kiefer	15

Quarterfinals
(Italy) Martina Batini	13
(United States) Lee Kiefer	15
