= 2013 Pan American Fencing Championships =

The 2013 Pan American Fencing Championships were held in Cartagena, Colombia from 16 June to 21 June.

== Medal summary ==
=== Men's events ===
Event	Gold	Silver	Bronze
Foil	Gerek Meinhardt (USA)	Race Imboden (USA)	Maximilien Van Haaster (CAN); Miles Chamley-Watson (USA)
Épée	Silvio Fernández (VEN)	Hugues Boisvert-Simard (CAN)	Ringo Quintero Alvarez (CUB); Rubén Limardo (VEN)
Sabre	Renzo Agresta (BRA)	Aleksander Ochocki (USA)	Daryl Homer (USA); Philippe Beaudry (CAN)
Team Foil	United States	Brazil	Canada
Team Épée	Venezuela	United States	Cuba
Team Sabre	United States	Canada	Venezuela

=== Women's events ===
Event	Gold	Silver	Bronze
Foil	Lee Kiefer (USA)	Nzingha Prescod (USA)	Alanna Goldie (CAN); Margaret Lu (USA)
Épée	Courtney Hurley (USA)	Katharine Holmes (USA)	Cleia Guilhon (BRA); Kelley Hurley (USA)
Sabre	Mariel Zagunis (USA)	Anne-Elizabeth Stone (USA)	Dagmara Wozniak (USA); Alejandra Benítez (VEN)
Team Foil	United States	Canada	Venezuela
Team Épée	United States	Brazil	Argentina
Team Sabre	United States	Mexico	Canada

=== Medal table ===
Rank	Nation	Gold	Silver	Bronze	Total
1	United States	9	6	5	20
2	Venezuela	2	0	4	6
3	Brazil	1	2	1	4
4	Canada	0	3	5	8
5	Mexico	0	1	0	1
6	Cuba	0	0	2	2
7	Argentina	0	0	1	1
Totals (7 entries)		12	12	18	42
