= Lee Kiefer =

American fencer (born 1994)

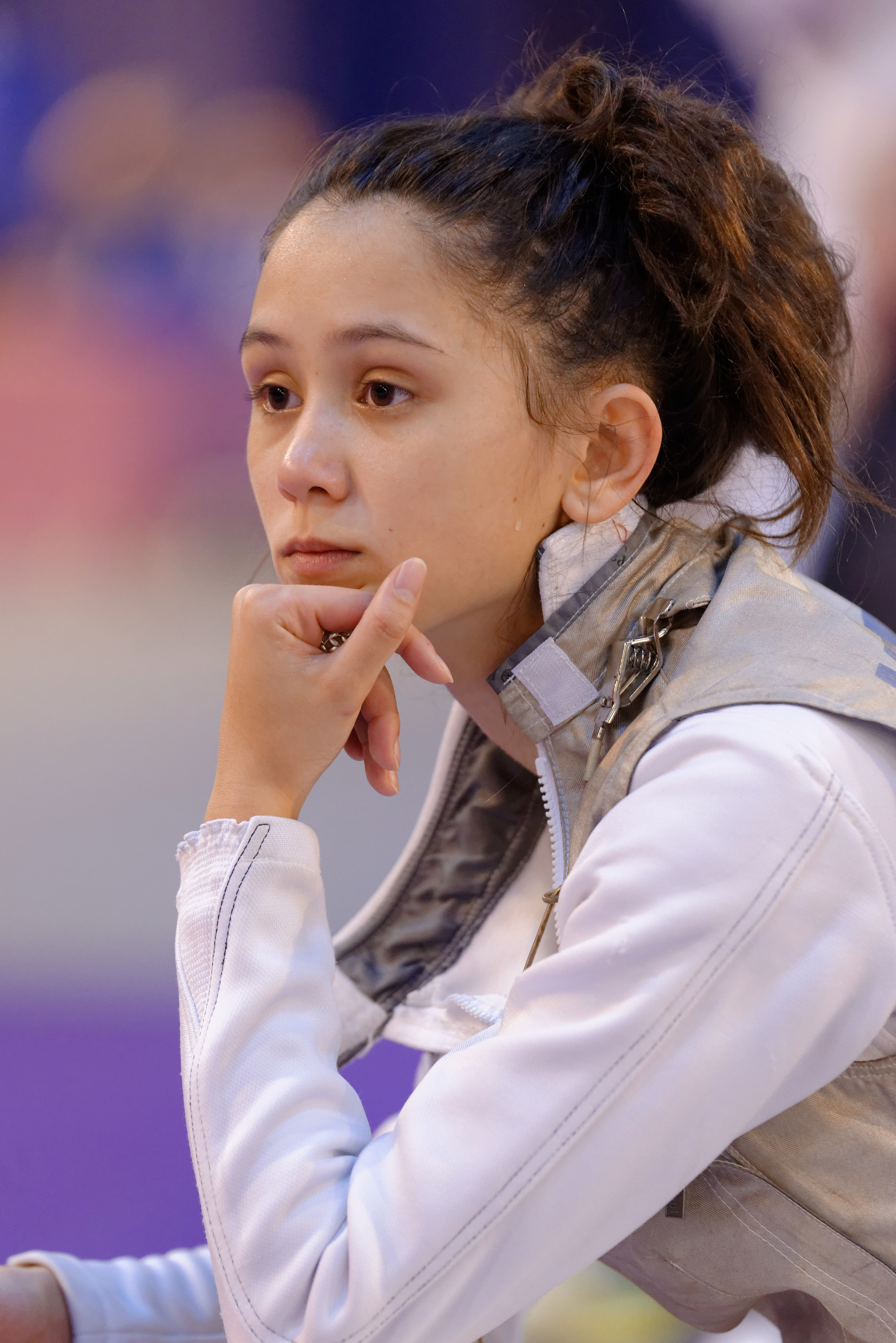
- Kiefer in 2014

Personal information
- Born: June 15, 1994 (age 32) Cleveland, Ohio, U.S.
- Height: 1.63 m (5 ft 4 in)
- Weight: 49 kg (108 lb)

Fencing career
- Sport: Fencing
- Country: United States
- Weapon: Foil
- Hand: Right-handed
- Club: Bluegrass Fencers Club
- Head coach: Amgad Khazbak
- FIE ranking: Current ranking
Medal record
Women's foil
Representing the United States
| Event | 1st | 2nd | 3rd |
|---|---|---|---|
| Olympic Games | 3 | 0 | 0 |
| World Championships | 3 | 2 | 4 |
| Pan American Games | 7 | 1 | 0 |
| Pan American Championships | 24 | 3 | 1 |
| Total | 37 | 6 | 5 |
Olympic Games
| Gold medal – first place | 2020 Tokyo | Individual |
| Gold medal – first place | 2024 Paris | Individual |
| Gold medal – first place | 2024 Paris | Team |
World Championships
| Gold medal – first place | 2018 Wuxi | Team |
| Gold medal – first place | 2025 Tbilisi | Individual |
| Gold medal – first place | 2025 Tbilisi | Team |
| Silver medal – second place | 2017 Leipzig | Team |
| Silver medal – second place | 2022 Cairo | Team |
| Bronze medal – third place | 2011 Catania | Individual |
| Bronze medal – third place | 2019 Budapest | Team |
| Bronze medal – third place | 2022 Cairo | Individual |
| Bronze medal – third place | 2023 Milan | Individual |
Pan American Games
| Gold medal – first place | 2011 Guadalajara | Individual |
| Gold medal – first place | 2011 Guadalajara | Team |
| Gold medal – first place | 2015 Toronto | Individual |
| Gold medal – first place | 2019 Lima | Individual |
| Gold medal – first place | 2019 Lima | Team |
| Gold medal – first place | 2023 Santiago | Individual |
| Gold medal – first place | 2023 Santiago | Team |
| Silver medal – second place | 2015 Toronto | Team |
Pan American Championships
| Gold medal – first place | 2010 San José | Individual |
| Gold medal – first place | 2010 San José | Team |
| Gold medal – first place | 2011 Reno | Individual |
| Gold medal – first place | 2011 Reno | Team |
| Gold medal – first place | 2012 Cancún | Individual |
| Gold medal – first place | 2012 Cancún | Team |
| Gold medal – first place | 2013 Cartagena | Individual |
| Gold medal – first place | 2013 Cartagena | Team |
| Gold medal – first place | 2014 San José | Individual |
| Gold medal – first place | 2014 San José | Team |
| Gold medal – first place | 2015 Santiago | Individual |
| Gold medal – first place | 2015 Santiago | Team |
| Gold medal – first place | 2016 Panama City | Individual |
| Gold medal – first place | 2016 Panama City | Team |
| Gold medal – first place | 2017 Montreal | Individual |
| Gold medal – first place | 2017 Montreal | Team |
| Gold medal – first place | 2018 Havana | Individual |
| Gold medal – first place | 2018 Havana | Team |
| Gold medal – first place | 2019 Toronto | Team |
| Gold medal – first place | 2023 Lima | Individual |
| Gold medal – first place | 2024 Lima | Individual |
| Gold medal – first place | 2024 Lima | Team |
| Gold medal – first place | 2025 Rio de Janeiro | Individual |
| Gold medal – first place | 2025 Rio de Janeiro | Team |
| Silver medal – second place | 2022 Asunción | Individual |
| Silver medal – second place | 2022 Asunción | Team |
| Silver medal – second place | 2023 Lima | Team |
| Bronze medal – third place | 2026 Lima | Individual |

Lee Kiefer (/ˈkiːfər/ KEE-fər; born June 15, 1994) is an American right-handed foil fencer, three-time Olympic champion in women's foil, having won the individual event at the 2020 Summer Olympics, and the individual and team events at the 2024 Summer Olympics and World champion in women's foil, having won the individual and team event at the 2025 World Championships and team events at the 2018 World Championships. She is the first American foil fencer in history to win an individual Olympic gold medal and most decorated women's foil fencer in American history.

Kiefer is a four-time Olympian, included 2020 individual and 2024 individual & team Olympic champion, three time World champion, included 2025 individual and team & 2018 team events, six time World medalists, included two silver and four bronze. A 16-time individual and 16-time team Pan American champion, included Pan American Games and Pan American Championships. A four-time NCAA individual and team champion.

Kiefer competed in the 2012 London Olympic Games, the 2016 Rio de Janeiro Olympic Games, and the 2020 Tokyo Olympic Games. She represented the United States at the 2024 Summer Olympics in Paris, France, in women's foil and women's team foil (with Jackie Dubrovich, Lauren Scruggs, and Maia Weintraub), winning gold medals in both.

== Early life ==
Kiefer was born on June 15, 1994, in Cleveland, Ohio, into a family of fencers and medical doctors. She grew up in Versailles, Kentucky, a suburb of Lexington. She began fencing at the age of six after watching her father, Steve, who captained the Duke Blue Devils fencing team in 1985 and was a two-time NCAA foil qualifier, compete at a local tournament. He then introduced her and her two siblings to the sport.

Kiefer attended Paul Laurence Dunbar High School in Lexington, Kentucky, and graduated in 2012.

== Fencing career ==
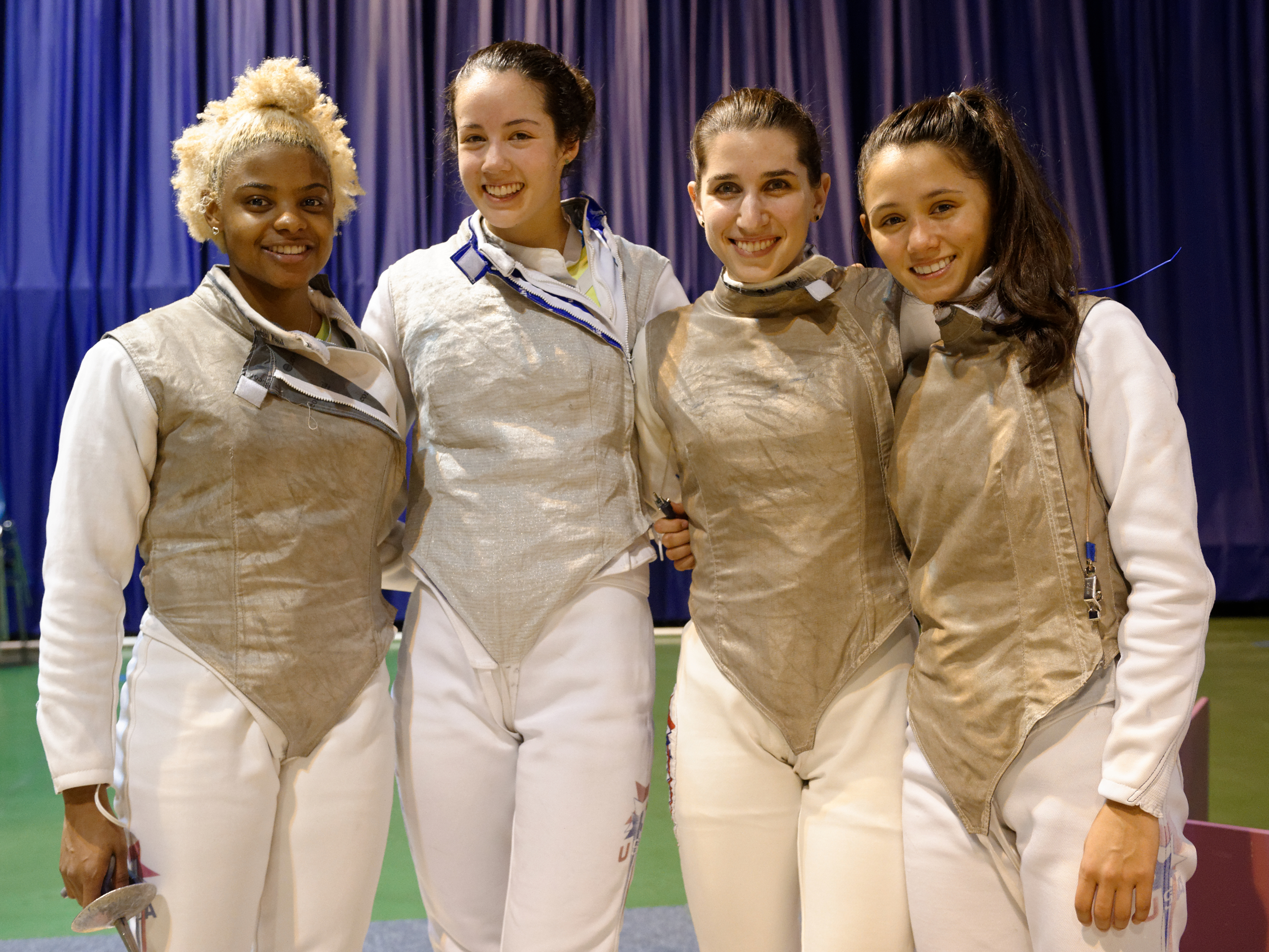
Team USA (from left: Nzingha Prescod, Sabrina Massialas, Nicole Ross, and Kiefer) in 2015

Kiefer attended the University of Notre Dame, where she fenced for the Fighting Irish and graduated in 2017.

Kiefer earned a bronze medal in women's foil at the 2011 World Fencing Championships. She placed 5th at the 2012 London Olympic Games, after losing to eventual silver medalist Arianna Errigo in the quarter final, 15–10. In the 2014–15 season she climbed her first World Cup podium with a silver medal in Saint-Maur. She went on to win the Algiers World Cup in early 2015 after defeating world No.1 Arianna Errigo, who had prevailed over her in Saint-Maur. By winning at the 2014 NCAA Fencing Championships, she joined her future husband, male fencer Gerek Meinhardt and swimmer Emma Reaney as part of the 2nd Notre Dame Fighting Irish trio to be named individual national champion in a single year and the 4th to be either individual national champion or national athlete of the year in a single year.

Following her win at the Long Beach Grand Prix on March 18, 2017, she moved into #1 in FIE world rankings, becoming the first American woman to hold the #1 position. She qualified to represent the United States in fencing at the 2020 Olympics in Tokyo in 2021 and reached the final in the individual foil. In the final, she defeated Inna Deriglazova, the defending champion from Russia, with a score of 15–13 to win gold, becoming the first American, male or female, to win the gold medal in Olympic individual foil.

She represented the United States at the 2024 Summer Olympics in Paris, France, in the women's foil and women's team foil, winning gold medals in both. Kiefer defended her gold medal in the individual foil, defeating Lauren Scruggs in the all-USA final. Her foil fencing victory at the Olympics made her the second non-European woman to do so, after Luan Jujie.

At the 2025 World Championships, Kiefer made history as the first American to claim an individual foil title, marking her first gold medal since 2018.

== Medal record ==
=== Olympic Games ===
| Year | Location | Event | Position |
|---|---|---|---|
| 2021 | Tokyo, Japan | Women's individual foil | 1st |
| 2024 | Paris, France | Women's individual foil | 1st |
| 2024 | Paris, France | Women's team foil | 1st |

=== World Championship ===
| Year | Location | Event | Position |
|---|---|---|---|
| 2011 | Catania, Italy | Individual Women's Foil | 3rd |
| 2017 | Leipzig, Germany | Team Women's Foil | 2nd |
| 2018 | Wuxi, China | Team Women's Foil | 1st |
| 2019 | Budapest, Hungary | Team Women's Foil | 3rd |
| 2022 | Cairo, Egypt | Individual Women's Foil | 3rd |
| 2022 | Cairo, Egypt | Team Women's Foil | 2nd |
| 2023 | Milan, Italy | Individual Women's Foil | 3rd |
| 2025 | (Georgia (country)) Tbilisi, Georgia | Individual Women's Foil | 1st |
| 2025 | (Georgia (country)) Tbilisi, Georgia | Team Women's Foil | 1st |

=== Grand Prix ===
| Date | Location | Event | Position |
|---|---|---|---|
| 2016-03-11 | Havana, Cuba | Individual Women's Foil | 2nd |
| 2016-06-03 | Shanghai, China | Individual Women's Foil | 2nd |
| 2016-12-02 | Turin, Italy | Individual Women's Foil | 1st |
| 2017-03-17 | (United States) Long Beach, California | Individual Women's Foil | 1st |
| 2018-03-17 | (United States) Anaheim, California | Individual Women's Foil | 3rd |
| 2019-05-17 | Shanghai, China | Individual Women's Foil | 3rd |
| 2020-02-07 | Turin, Italy | Individual Women's Foil | 2nd |
| 2022-05-14 | Incheon, South Korea | Individual Women's Foil | 1st |
| 2023-03-17 | Busan, South Korea | Individual Women's Foil | 1st |
| 2023-05-19 | Shanghai, China | Individual Women's Foil | 3rd |
| 2024-02-10 | Turin, Italy | Individual Women's Foil | 1st |
| 2024-03-17 | Washington, D.C., United States | Individual Women's Foil | 1st |
| 2024-05-18 | Shanghai, China | Individual Women's Foil | 3rd |
| 2025-03-21 | Lima, Peru | Individual Women's Foil | 3rd |
| 2025-05-16 | Shanghai, China | Individual Women's Foil | 2nd |

=== World Cup ===
| Date | Location | Event | Position |
|---|---|---|---|
| 2014-11-07 | Saint-Maur-des-Fossés, France | Individual Women's Foil | 2nd |
| 2015-02-06 | Algier, Algeria | Individual Women's Foil | 1st |
| 2015-11-06 | Saint-Maur-des-Fossés, France | Individual Women's Foil | 3rd |
| 2016-05-20 | Tauberbischofsheim, Germany | Individual Women's Foil | 3rd |
| 2017-02-03 | Gdańsk, Poland | Individual Women's Foil | 3rd |
| 2017-04-28 | Tauberbischofsheim, Germany | Individual Women's Foil | 1st |
| 2017-10-13 | Cancún, Mexico | Individual Women's Foil | 1st |
| 2018-01-12 | Katowice, Poland | Individual Women's Foil | 2nd |
| 2018-04-27 | Tauberbischofsheim, Germany | Individual Women's Foil | 3rd |
| 2019-01-11 | Katowice, Poland | Individual Women's Foil | 3rd |
| 2019-03-01 | Cairo, Egypt | Individual Women's Foil | 3rd |
| 2019-12-13 | Saint-Maur-des-Fossés, France | Individual Women's Foil | 3rd |
| 2020-01-10 | Katowice, Poland | Individual Women's Foil | 3rd |
| 2021-12-10 | Saint-Maur-des-Fossés, France | Individual Women's Foil | 2nd |
| 2022-02-25 | Guadalajara, Mexico | Individual Women's Foil | 2nd |
| 2022-04-15 | Belgrade, Serbia | Individual Women's Foil | 3rd |
| 2022-04-29 | Tauberbischofsheim, Germany | Individual Women's Foil | 1st |
| 2022-12-09 | Belgrade, Serbia | Individual Women's Foil | 3rd |
| 2022-12-09 | Belgrade, Serbia | Team Women's Foil | 2nd |
| 2023-01-12 | Paris, France | Individual Women's Foil | 2nd |
| 2023-02-23 | Cairo, Egypt | Individual Women's Foil | 3rd |
| 2023-02-23 | Cairo, Egypt | Team Women's Foil | 2nd |
| 2023-05-05 | Plovdiv, Bulgaria | Individual Women's Foil | 1st |
| 2023-12-09 | Novi Sad, Serbia | Individual Women's Foil | 2nd |
| 2024-02-24 | Cairo, Egypt | Individual Women's Foil | 2nd |
| 2024-12-07 | (South Korea) Busan, Korea | Team Women's Foil | 2nd |
| 2025-01-12 | Hong Kong, China | Team Women's Foil | 2nd |
| 2025-03-09 | Cairo, Egypt | Team Women's Foil | 2nd |
| 2025-05-01 | Vancouver, Canada | Individual Women's Foil | 2nd |
| 2025-05-04 | Vancouver, Canada | Team Women's Foil | 2nd |
| 2025-11-09 | Palma de Mallorca, Spain | Team Women's Foil | 2nd |
| 2025-12-07 | (South Korea) Busan, Korea | Team Women's Foil | 2nd |
| 2026-01-09 | Hong Kong, China | Individual Women's Foil | 1st |
| 2026-01-11 | Hong Kong, China | Team Women's Foil | 3rd |
| 2026-04-19 | Cairo, Egypt | Team Women's Foil | 3rd |

=== Pan American Championship ===
| Year | Location | Event | Position |
|---|---|---|---|
| 2010 | San José, Costa Rica | Individual Women's Foil | 1st |
| 2010 | San José, Costa Rica | Team Women's Foil | 1st |
| 2011 | (United States) Reno, Nevada | Individual Women's Foil | 1st |
| 2011 | (United States) Reno, Nevada | Team Women's Foil | 1st |
| 2012 | Cancún, Mexico | Individual Women's Foil | 1st |
| 2012 | Cancún, Mexico | Team Women's Foil | 1st |
| 2013 | Cartagena, Colombia | Individual Women's Foil | 1st |
| 2013 | Cartagena, Colombia | Team Women's Foil | 1st |
| 2014 | San José, Costa Rica | Individual Women's Foil | 1st |
| 2014 | San José, Costa Rica | Team Women's Foil | 1st |
| 2015 | Santiago, Chile | Individual Women's Foil | 1st |
| 2015 | Santiago, Chile | Team Women's Foil | 1st |
| 2016 | Panama City, Panama | Individual Women's Foil | 1st |
| 2016 | Panama City, Panama | Team Women's Foil | 1st |
| 2017 | Montreal, Canada | Individual Women's Foil | 1st |
| 2017 | Montreal, Canada | Team Women's Foil | 1st |
| 2018 | Havana, Cuba | Individual Women's Foil | 1st |
| 2018 | Havana, Cuba | Team Women's Foil | 1st |
| 2019 | Toronto, Canada | Team Women's Foil | 1st |
| 2022 | Asunción, Paraguay | Individual Women's Foil | 2nd |
| 2022 | Asunción, Paraguay | Team Women's Foil | 2nd |
| 2023 | Lima, Peru | Individual Women's Foil | 1st |
| 2023 | Lima, Peru | Team Women's Foil | 2nd |
| 2024 | Lima, Peru | Individual Women's Foil | 1st |
| 2024 | Lima, Peru | Team Women's Foil | 1st |
| 2025 | Rio de Janeiro, Brazil | Individual Women's Foil | 1st |
| 2025 | Rio de Janeiro, Brazil | Team Women's Foil | 1st |
| 2026 | Lima, Peru | Individual Women's Foil | 3rd |

=== NCAA Championship ===
| Year | Location | Event | Position |
|---|---|---|---|
| 2013 | San Antonio, Texas | Individual Women's Foil | 1st |
| 2013 | San Antonio, Texas | Team Fencing | 2nd |
| 2014 | Columbus, Ohio | Individual Women's Foil | 1st |
| 2015 | Columbus, Ohio | Individual Women's Foil | 1st |
| 2015 | Columbus, Ohio | Team Fencing | 3rd |
| 2017 | Indianapolis, Indiana | Individual Women's Foil | 1st |
| 2017 | Indianapolis, Indiana | Team Fencing | 1st |

== Personal life ==
Kiefer is of Filipino descent through her mother, Teresa, a practicing psychiatrist originally from Tagum City, Philippines, who immigrated to the United States at age 10, and of White American descent through her father, Steven, a practicing neurosurgeon from Northern Kentucky.

Kiefer is the second eldest of three siblings. Her older sister, Alexandra Kiefer, is a former foil fencer for the Harvard Crimson who won the Women's Foil Individual Champion title at the 2011 NCAA Fencing Championships and is now a medical doctor. Her younger brother, Axel Kiefer, was the 2015 USA Fencing National Championships Junior gold medalist. He also fenced foil for the Notre Dame Fighting Irish, finishing second in the 2019 NCAA Fencing Championship, and is now a psychiatric resident after graduating from medical school.

Kiefer began dating fellow foil fencer Gerek Meinhardt during the 2012 Summer Olympics. They developed a relationship through competing and training together, bonding over their shared Asian American backgrounds and interests in reading fantasy books, foil fencing, and studying medicine. The couple got engaged in January 2018 and married in September 2019. Often referred to as the "first couple of U.S. Fencing," they have competed together in four Summer Olympic Games: 2012, 2016, 2020, and 2024.

Kiefer was a medical student at the University of Kentucky College of Medicine in Lexington, Kentucky, having matriculated in the fall of 2017. In 2025, Kiefer and Meinhardt announced via a LinkedIn post that they have decided to pursue other goals and not return to medical school to finish their MD degrees. As of 2026 they are currently focused on training for the 2028 Olympics and running their fencing clinic business, KM Fencing.

== See also ==
- List of Filipino American sportspeople
- List of USFA Division I National Champions
- List of NCAA fencing champions
