= Fencing at the 2024 Summer Olympics – Women's team foil =

Women's team foil at the Games of the XXXIII Olympiad
- Olympic fencing
- Venue: Grand Palais strip
- Date: 1 August 2024
- Competitors: 32 from 8 nations
- Teams: 8

Medalists
| 1st place, gold medalist(s) | | Jacqueline Dubrovich; Lee Kiefer; Lauren Scruggs; Maia Weintraub | United States |
| 2nd place, silver medalist(s) | | Arianna Errigo; Martina Favaretto; Francesca Palumbo; Alice Volpi | Italy |
| 3rd place, bronze medalist(s) | | Sera Azuma; Yuka Ueno; Karin Miyawaki; Komaki Kikuchi | Japan |

The women's team foil event at the 2024 Summer Olympics took on 1 August 2024 at the Grand Palais strip. 32 fencers (eight teams of four) from eight nations competed.

== Background ==
The Russian Olympic Committee, the titleholder from 2020, did not compete this time. The United States team, featuring two-time individual foil gold medalist Lee Kiefer and her fellow teammates, triumphed over Italy, the bronze medalist from 2020, marking the first time a non-European team has secured a gold medal in women's team foil.

== Qualification ==
A National Olympic Committee (NOC) could enter a team of three fencers in the women's team foil. These fencers also automatically qualified for the individual event.

== Competition format ==
The tournament was a single-elimination tournament, with classification matches for all places. Each match featured the three fencers on each team competing in a round-robin, with nine three-minute bouts to five points; the winning team was the one that reaches 45 total points first or was leading after the end of the nine bouts.

== Schedule ==
The competition was held over a single day.

All times are Central European Summer Time (UTC+2)

| Date | Time | Round |
|---|---|---|
| Thursday, 1 August 2024 | 13:00; 16:40; 17:30; 17:30; 20:20; 21:20 | Quarterfinals; Semifinals; Classification 7/8; Classification 5/6; Bronze medal match Gold medal match |

== Results ==
Quarter-finals
Italy | 45
Egypt | 14
Poland | 30
Japan | 45
France | 36
Canada | 38
China | 37
United States | 45

Semi-finals
Italy | 45
Japan | 39
Canada | 31
United States | 45

Final
Italy | 39
United States | 45
Bronze medal bout
Japan | 33
Canada | 32

5–8th place classification

5–8th place semifinals
Egypt | 21
Poland | 45
France | 45
China | 39

Fifth place bout
Poland | 44
France | 45
Seventh place bout
Egypt | 18
China | 45

== Final classification ==
| Rank | Team | Athletes |
|---|---|---|
| 1st place, gold medalist(s) | United States | Jacqueline Dubrovich; Lee Kiefer; Lauren Scruggs; Maia Weintraub |
| 2nd place, silver medalist(s) | Italy | Arianna Errigo; Martina Favaretto; Francesca Palumbo; Alice Volpi |
| 3rd place, bronze medalist(s) | Japan | Sera Azuma; Komaki Kikuchi; Karin Miyawaki; Yuka Ueno |
| 4 | Canada | Jessica Guo; Eleanor Harvey; Yunjia Zhang |
| 5 | France | Pauline Ranvier; Ysaora Thibus; Eva Lacheray; Anita Blaze |
| 6 | Poland | Julia Walczyk; Martyna Jelińska; Hanna Łyczbińska; Martyna Synoradzka |
| 7 | China | Huang Qianqian; Wang Yuting; Chen Qingyuan; Jiao Enqi |
| 8 | Egypt | Sara Amr Hossny; Yara El-Sharkawy; Malak Hamza; Noha Hany |
