= Women's team foil at the 2019 World Fencing Championships =

- Venue: SYMA Sports and Conference Centre
- Location: Budapest, Hungary
- Dates: 21–22 July

Medalists
gold medal	Inna Deriglazova; Anastasiia Ivanova; Larisa Korobeynikova; Adelina Zagidullina	Russia
silver medal	Elisa Di Francisca; Arianna Errigo; Francesca Palumbo; Alice Volpi	Italy
bronze medal	Jacqueline Dubrovich; Lee Kiefer; Nzingha Prescod; Nicole Ross	United States

The Women's team foil competition at the 2019 World Fencing Championships was held on 21 and 22 July 2019.

== Draw ==
=== Finals ===
Semifinals
France	37
Italy	45
Russia	45
United States	36

Final
Italy	42
Russia	43
Third place
France	43
United States	45

=== Top half ===
==== Section 1 ====
Round of 32
Egypt	44
Singapore	45
Poland	45
Philippines	20
Argentina	28
Germany	45

Round of 16
France	45
Singapore	19
Poland	32
Germany	28

Quarterfinals
France	45
Poland	39

==== Section 2 ====
Round of 32
Japan	45
Vietnam	19
Australia	18
Hong Kong	45
Ukraine	45
Chile	23
Romania	20
Italy	43

Round of 16
Japan	44
Hong Kong	32
Ukraine	25
Italy	45

Quarterfinals
Japan	25
Italy	44

=== Bottom half ===
==== Section 3 ====
Round of 32
Russia	DNS
Venezuela
Chinese Taipei	28
Spain	45
China	45
Algeria	15
Mexico	34
South Korea	43

Round of 16
Russia	45
Spain	37
China	23
South Korea	25

Quarterfinals
Russia	33
South Korea	25

==== Section 4 ====
Round of 32
Canada	45
Colombia	18
Thailand	12
Hungary	45
Brazil	43
Austria	44

Round of 16
Canada	45
Hungary	25
Austria	16
United States	45

Quarterfinals
Canada	41
United States	45

=== Placement rounds ===
==== 5–8th place bracket ====
5–8th place semifinals
Poland	29
Japan	34
South Korea	29
Canada	45

Fifth place
Japan	33
Canada	32
Seventh place
Poland	29
South Korea	28

==== 9–16th place bracket ====
9–16th place quarterfinals
Singapore	27
Germany	45
Hong Kong	31
Ukraine	45
Spain	23
China	45
Hungary	45
Austria	39

9–12th place semifinals
Germany	45
Ukraine	24
China	40
Hungary	45

Ninth place
Germany	45
Hungary	39
Eleventh place
Ukraine	24
China	45

==== 13–16th place bracket ====
13–16th place semifinals
Singapore	40
Hong Kong	45
Spain	42
Austria	45

13th place
Hong Kong	45
Austria	37
15th place
Singapore	38
Spain	45

== Final ranking ==
Rank	Team
1st place, gold medalist(s)	Russia
2nd place, silver medalist(s)	Italy
3rd place, bronze medalist(s)	United States
4	France
5	Japan
6	Canada
7	Poland
8	South Korea
9	Germany
10	Hungary
11	China
12	Ukraine
13	Hong Kong
14	Austria
15	Spain
16	Singapore
17	Brazil
18	Egypt
19	Chinese Taipei
20	Chile
21	Australia
22	Algeria
23	Thailand
24	Philippines
25	Argentina
26	Colombia
27	Mexico
28	Vietnam
29	Romania
30	Venezuela
