= Nicole Ross =

American fencer

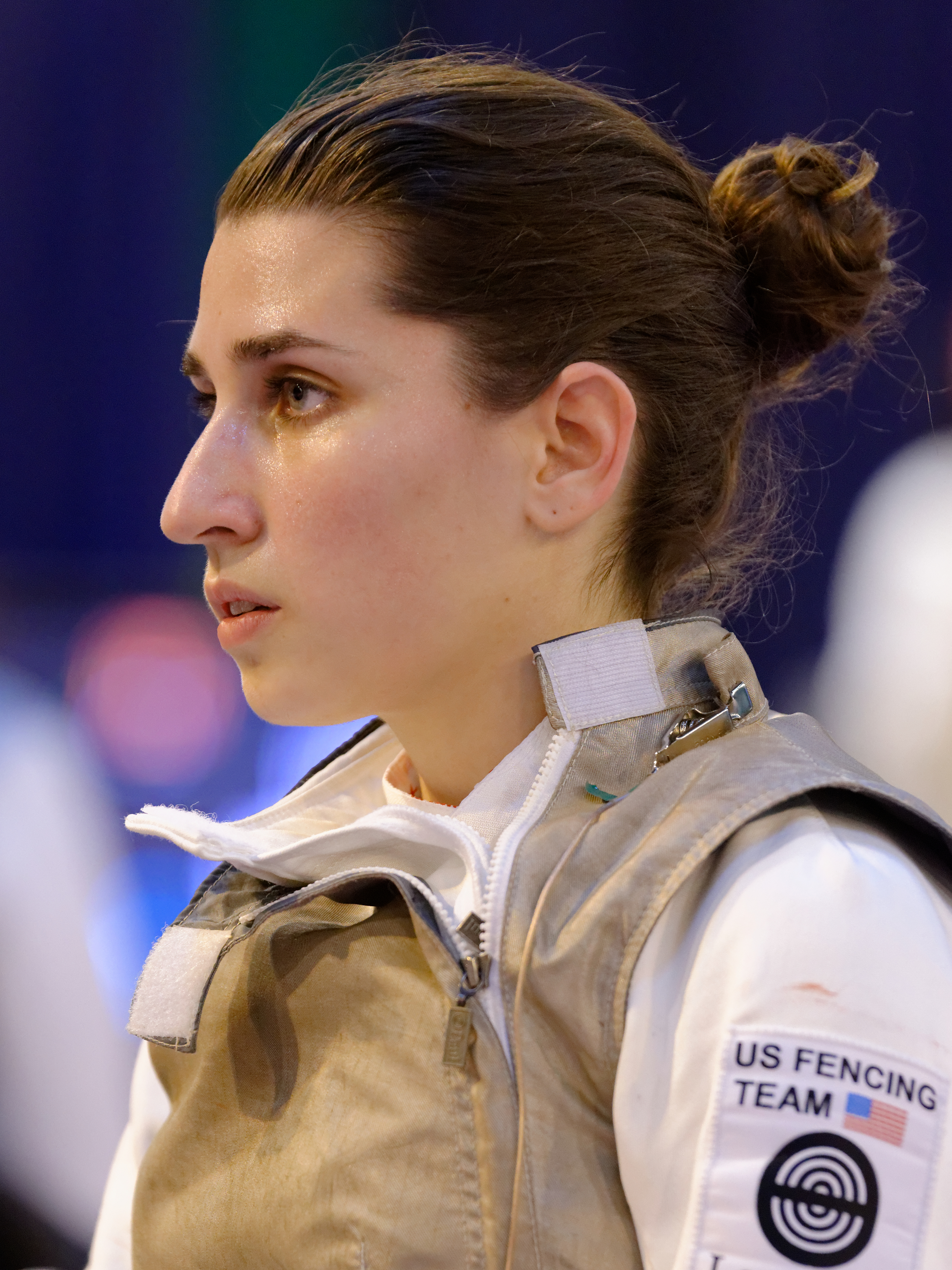

Personal information
- Born: January 15, 1989 (age 37) New York, United States
- Height: 1.65 m (5 ft 5 in)
- Weight: 54 kg (119 lb)

Fencing career
- Sport: Fencing
- Country: United States
- Weapon: Foil
- Hand: right-handed
- Club: New York Athletic Club
- FIE ranking: current ranking
Medal record
World Championships
| Gold medal – first place | 2018 Wuxi | Team |
| Silver medal – second place | 2017 Leipzig | Team |
| Bronze medal – third place | 2019 Budapest | Team |
Pan American Games
| Gold medal – first place | 2019 Lima | Team |
| Silver medal – second place | 2015 Toronto | Team |
| Bronze medal – third place | 2015 Toronto | Individual |

Nicole Ross (born January 15, 1989) is an American foil fencer. Fencing for the Columbia Lions fencing team, she won the 2010 NCAA individual women's foil title, and was a three time All-American. At the 2012 Summer Olympics she competed in individual women's foil, coming in 25th, while in the team event she and her teammates came in sixth. At the 2018 World Championships, she and Team USA won the gold medal in the women's team foil event.

She represented the United States in fencing at the 2020 Olympics in Tokyo in 2021.

== Early and personal life ==
Ross was born in Manhattan in New York City, and was raised on the Upper West Side, and is Jewish. She graduated Columbia Grammar & Preparatory School in 2007 and then completed a B.A. in Art History from Columbia University in 2013. As of 2022, she is studying for her master's in psychology at The New School, and hopes to pursue a PhD in clinical psychology.

== Fencing career ==
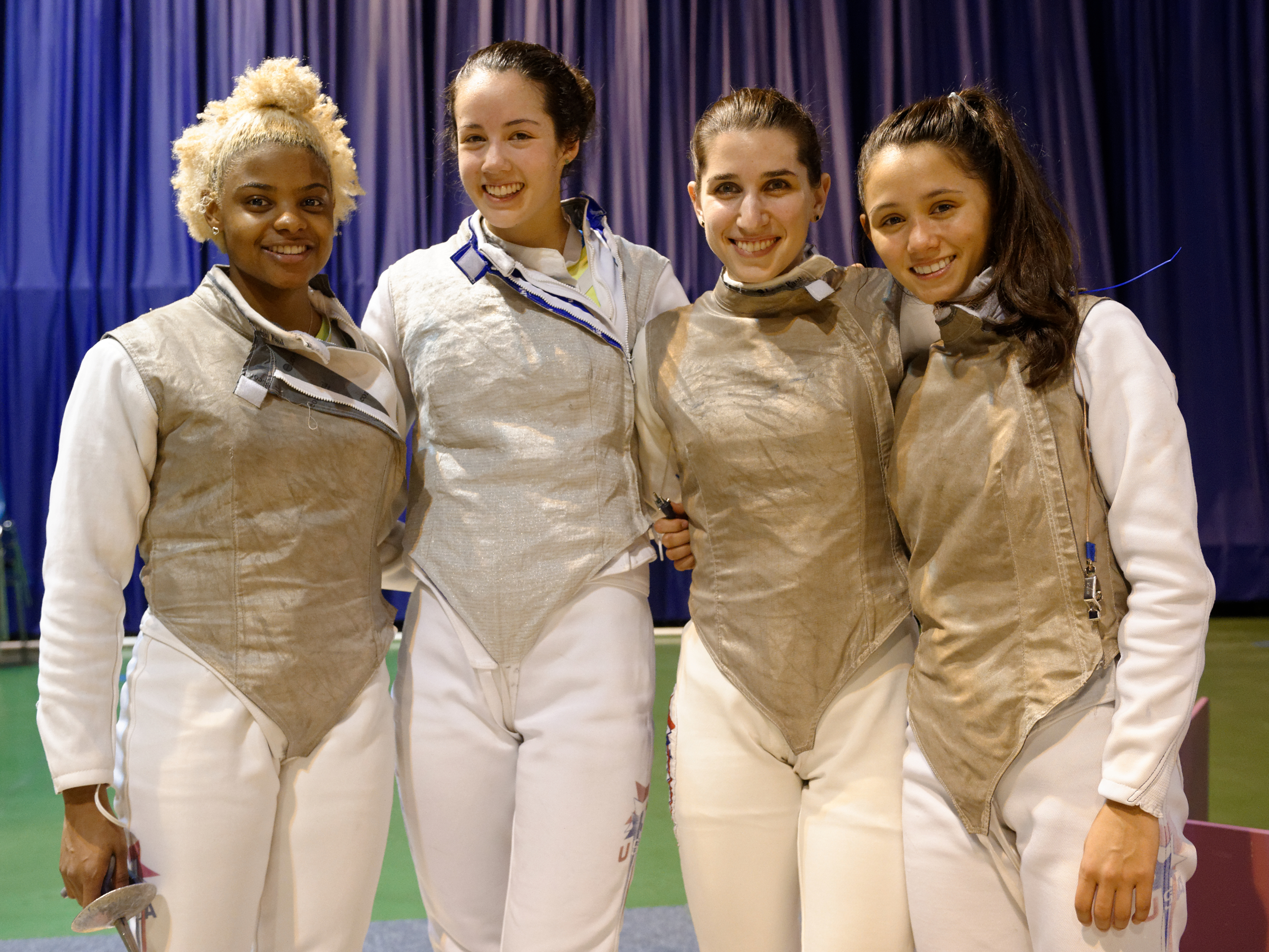
Team USA (from left: Nzingha Prescod, Sabrina Massialas, Nicole Ross, and Lee Kiefer) in 2015.

Ross took up fencing at the age of 9, inspired by The Princess Bride. She was part of the USA's gold medal-winning 2009 Junior World Championship team in Belfast.

She fenced for the Columbia Lions fencing team. In 2008, 2009, and 2010, Ross was a first team All-American. She won the NCAA individual women's foil title in 2010.

In 2011, Ross had a kidney ailment, but recovered in time to make Team USA. At the 2012 Summer Olympics, Ross competed in the women's foil, and reached the second round where she was defeated 8–15, and came in 25th in the individual event. In the team event, she and Team USA came in sixth.

Ross won silver medals at the 2015 and 2016 Pan American Fencing Championships, and bronze medals at the 2009 and 2017 Pan American Fencing Championships. She won a gold medal at the 2019 Pan American Games team championship. As of 2017, she credited two-time Olympian Soren Thompson, coach Simon Gershon, and USA Fencing women's foil coach Buckie Leach for her achievements.

At the 2017 World Championships, Lee Kiefer, Margaret Lu, Nzingha Prescod, and Ross won the silver medal in the women's team foil event. At the 2018 World Championships she and Team USA won the gold medal in team foil, and at the 2019 World Championships they won the bronze medal.

In December 2019 she tore her ACL at a qualifying event. Ross nevertheless competed on the World Cup circuit in January 2020, before undergoing ACL reconstructive surgery in May 2020. She fences for the New York Athletic Club, and is coached by Jimmy Moody. She has been the U.S. Fencing Senior National Team Captain since 2012.

She was the head fencing coach at Marymount School of New York in 2012–13, was an assistant coach at Cornell University from 2016 to 2018, and since 2020 has been an assistant coach at Harvard University for the Harvard Crimson fencing team.

Ross represented the United States in fencing at the 2020 Olympics in Tokyo in 2021. She became the 12th fencer in Columbia University history to participate in two or more Olympic Games.

== See also ==
- List of NCAA fencing champions
