= Anastasiia Ivanova =

Russian foil fencer

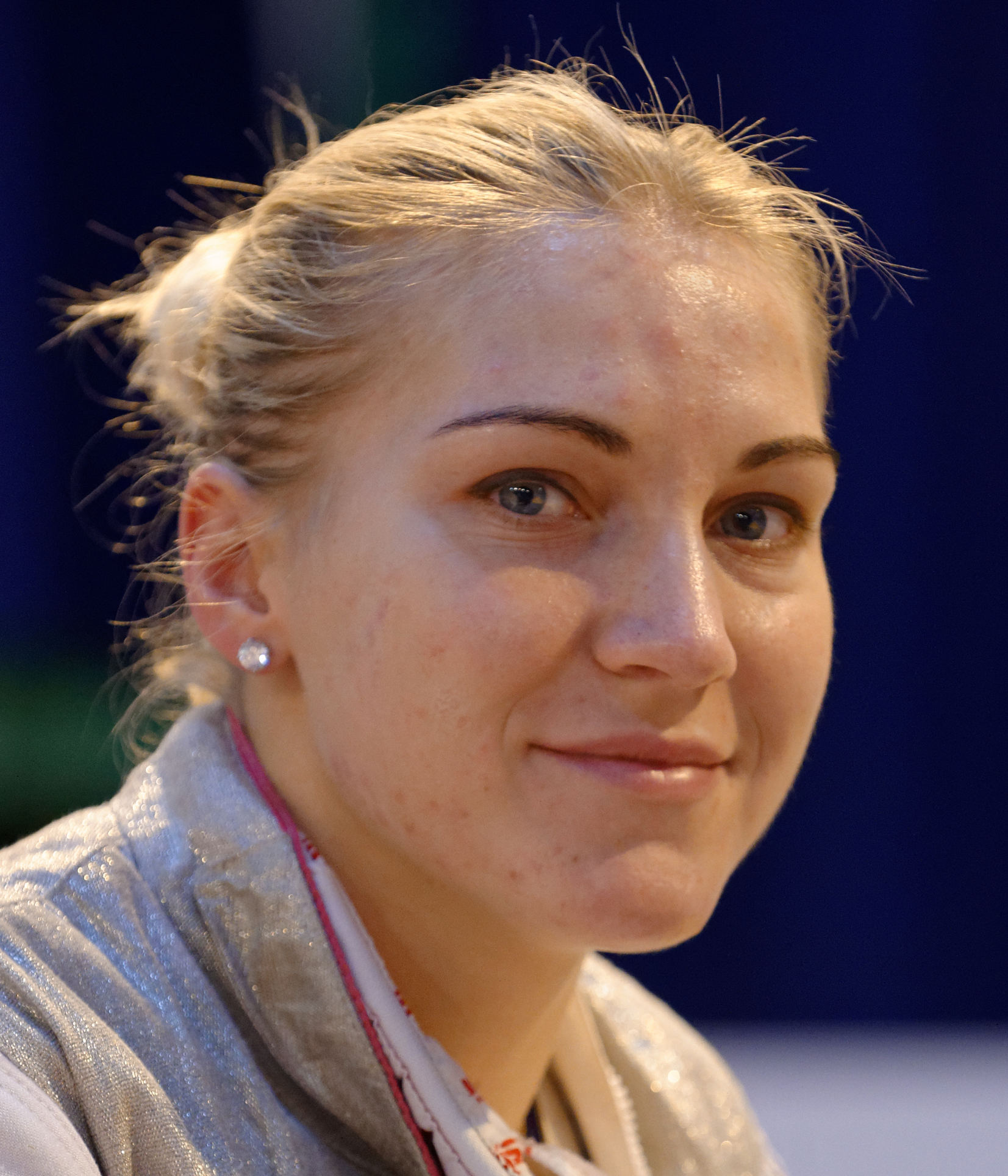

Personal information
- Born: 21 March 1990 (age 36)

Fencing career
- Sport: Fencing
- Country: Russia
- Weapon: Foil
- Hand: right-handed
- Club: CSKA Moscow (Central Sports Army Club) [RUS]; Ufa Fencing Sports School of Olympic Reserve [RUS]
- FIE ranking: current ranking
Medal record
World Championships
Gold medal – first place	2019 Budapest	Team
Bronze medal – third place	2017 Leipzig	Team
European Championships
Gold medal – first place	2019 Düsseldorf	Team
Silver medal – second place	2018 Novi Sad	Team
European Games
Gold medal – first place	2015 Baku	Team

Anastasiia Ivanova (born 21 March 1990) is a Russian foil fencer.

She participated at the 2019 World Fencing Championships, winning a gold medal with the Russian team. She is a Russian Armed Forces athlete, and her clubs are the Central Sports Army Club [RUS], and Ufa Fencing Sports School of Olympic Reserve [RUS].
