= Women's team foil at the 2017 World Fencing Championships =

- Venue: Arena Leipzig
- Location: Leipzig, Germany
- Dates: 24 July

Medalists
gold medal	Martina Batini; Arianna Errigo; Camilla Mancini; Alice Volpi	Italy
silver medal	Lee Kiefer; Margaret Lu; Nzingha Prescod; Nicole Ross	United States
bronze medal	Inna Deriglazova; Anastasia Ivanova; Svetlana Tripapina; Adelina Zagidullina	Russia

The Women's team foil event of the 2017 World Fencing Championships was held on 24 July 2017.

== Draw ==
=== Championship bracket ===
Round of 16
Japan	44
Hungary	43
Germany	45
Hong Kong	22
Sweden	30
France	45
United States	45
Argentina	22
China	45
South Korea	38
Canada	45
Poland	34

Quarterfinals
Italy	45
Japan	25
Germany	45
France	40
United States	45
China	30
Canada	36
Russia	42

Semifinals
Italy	45
Germany	34
United States	45
Russia	42

Final
Italy	45
United States	25
Third place
Germany	29
Russia	45

=== 5–8th place bracket ===
5–8th place semifinals
Japan	41
France	45
China	39
Canada	45

Fifth place
France	45
Canada	34
Seventh place
Japan	29
China	45

=== 9–14th place bracket ===
9–14th place semifinals
Hong Kong	40
Sweden	39
Argentina	22
South Korea	45

9–12th place semifinals
Hungary	45
Hong Kong	24
South Korea	39
Poland	45

Ninth place
Hungary	44
Poland	43
Eleventh place
Hong Kong	20
South Korea	45

=== 13–14th place bracket ===
13th place
Sweden	45
Argentina	39

== Final ranking ==
Rank	Team
Gold medal	Italy
Silver medal	United States
Bronze medal	Russia
4	Germany
5	France
6	Canada
7	China
8	Japan
9	Hungary
10	Poland
11	South Korea
12	Hong Kong
13	Sweden
14	Argentina
