= Women's team foil at the 2023 World Fencing Championships =

- Venue: Milan Convention Center
- Location: Milan, Italy
- Dates: 28–29 July
- Competitors: 105 from 27 nations
- Teams: 27

Medalists
gold medal	Arianna Errigo; Martina Favaretto; Francesca Palumbo; Alice Volpi	Italy
silver medal	Solène Butruille; Morgane Patru; Pauline Ranvier; Ysaora Thibus	France
bronze medal	Sera Azuma; Komaki Kikuchi; Karin Miyawaki; Yuka Ueno	Japan

The Women's team foil competition at the 2023 World Fencing Championships was held on 29 July 2023.

== Draw ==
=== Finals ===
Semifinals
Italy	43
Japan	30
France	45
United States	42

Final
Italy	45
France	39
Third place
Japan	45
United States	34

=== Top half ===
==== Section 1 ====
Round of 32
Romania	37
Great Britain	35
Spain	45
Algeria	15
Venezuela	17
Germany	45

Round of 16
Italy	45
Romania	18
Spain	25
Germany	45

Quarterfinals
Italy	45
Germany	23

==== Section 2 ====
Round of 32
Brazil	19
Ukraine	45
Austria	45
Chile	36

Round of 16
Canada	30
Ukraine	24
Austria	32
Japan	45

Quarterfinals
Canada	34
Japan	45

=== Bottom half ===
==== Section 3 ====
Round of 32
Egypt	45
Singapore	35
South Korea	45
Argentina	35
Colombia	19
China	45

Round of 16
France	45
Egypt	25
South Korea	27
China	28

Quarterfinals
France	45
China	32

==== Section 4 ====
Round of 32
Poland	45
India	16
Australia	20
Hungary	45
Hong Kong	44
Mexico	27

Round of 16
Poland	45
Hungary	43
Hong Kong	14
United States	45

Quarterfinals
Poland	28
United States	45

=== Placement rounds ===
==== 5–8th place bracket ====
5–8th place semifinals
Germany	45
Canada	40
China	45
Poland	31

Fifth place
Germany	28
China	27
Seventh place
Canada	41
Poland	43

==== 9–16th place bracket ====
9–16th place quarterfinals
Romania	43
Spain	33
Ukraine	45
Austria	28
Egypt	38
South Korea	41
Hungary	45
Hong Kong	31

9–12th place semifinals
Romania	31
Ukraine	32
South Korea	45
Hungary	44

Ninth place
Ukraine	34
South Korea	44
Eleventh place
Romania	45
Hungary	44

==== 13–16th place bracket ====
13–16th place semifinals
Spain	23
Austria	45
Egypt	21
Hong Kong	45

13th place
Austria	45
Hong Kong	24
15th place
Spain	45
Egypt	30

== Final ranking ==
Rank	Team
1st place, gold medalist(s)	Italy
2nd place, silver medalist(s)	France
3rd place, bronze medalist(s)	Japan
4	United States
5	Poland
6	Canada
7	Germany
8	China
9	South Korea
10	Ukraine
11	Romania
12	Hungary
13	Austria
14	Hong Kong
15	Spain
16	Egypt
17	Singapore
18	Great Britain
19	Mexico
20	Chile
21	Brazil
22	Argentina
23	Australia
24	Algeria
25	Venezuela
26	India
27	Colombia
