= 2017 NCAA Fencing Championships =

2017 NCAA Fencing tournament
- Teams: 62
- Format: Single-elimination
- Finals site: Indianapolis, Indiana; Indiana Farmers Coliseum
- Champions: Notre Dame Fighting Irish (5th title)
- Runner-up: Ohio State Buckeyes (6th title game)
- Semifinalists: Columbia Lions; Princeton Tigers
- Winning coach: Gia Kvaratskhelia (1st title)
- MVP: Lee Kiefer ((Notre Dame))
- Attendance: 1,023
- Television: ESPN3

The 2017 NCAA Fencing Championships took place from March 23 to March 26 in Indianapolis, Indiana at the Indiana Farmers Coliseum. The tournament went into its 28th consecutive NCAA Fencing Championships, and featured twenty-seven teams across all divisions.

== Team results ==
- Note: Top 10 only
- (H): Team from hosting U.S. state

Rank	Team	Points	Indicators
1st place, gold medalist(s)	Notre Dame (H)	186	274
2nd place, silver medalist(s)	Ohio State	161	217
3rd place, bronze medalist(s)	Columbia	152	151
4	Princeton	145	111
5	Harvard	124	-12
6	St. John's	119	153
7	Penn State	118	12
8	Penn	107	-68
9	Duke	82	-105
10	Stanford	78	-141
11	New York University	67	-91
12	Yale University	63	-208
13	Wayne State University	54	83
14	U.C. San Diego	28	15
15	Cornell University	25	-50
16	NJ Institute of Technology	23	-45
17	Temple University	20	-23
18	Boston College	16	-40
19	Northwestern University	16	-55
20	University of the Incarnate Word	14	-54
21	Fairleigh Dickinson	12	0
22	U.S. Air Force Academy	11	-2
23	Vassar College	9	-3
24	UNC, Chapel Hill	9	-19
25	M.I.T.	7	-15
26	Brown University	7	-34
27	University of Detroit Mercy	3	-51

== Individual results ==
- Note: Table does not include consolation
- (H): Individual from hosting U.S. State

Games	First	Second	Third
Women's saber details	Francesca Russo (Indiana) Notre Dame (H)	Teodora Kakhiani (Pennsylvania) Penn State	Maia Chamberlain (New Jersey) Princeton
Women's saber details	Francesca Russo (Indiana) Notre Dame (H)	Teodora Kakhiani (Pennsylvania) Penn State	Mathilda Taharo (New York (state)) St. John's
Women's foil details	Lee Kiefer (Indiana) Notre Dame (H)	Alanna Goldie; Ohio State	Margaret Lu (New York (state)) Columbia
Women's foil details	Lee Kiefer (Indiana) Notre Dame (H)	Alanna Goldie; Ohio State	Eleanor Harvey; Ohio State
Women's épée details	Anna Van Brummen (New Jersey) Princeton	Katharine Holmes (New Jersey) Princeton	Amanda Sirico (Indiana) Notre Dame (H)
Women's épée details	Anna Van Brummen (New Jersey) Princeton	Katharine Holmes (New Jersey) Princeton	Eugenia Falqui; Ohio State
Men's saber details	Eli Dershwitz (Massachusetts) Harvard	Ziad Elsissy (Michigan) Wayne State	Fares Arfa; Ohio State
Men's saber details	Eli Dershwitz (Massachusetts) Harvard	Ziad Elsissy (Michigan) Wayne State	Ben Natanzon (New York (state)) St. John's
Men's foil details	Andras Nemeth (New York (state)) St. John's	Nolen Scruggs (New York (state)) Columbia	Alexander Massialas (California) Stanford
Men's foil details	Andras Nemeth (New York (state)) St. John's	Nolen Scruggs (New York (state)) Columbia	Maximilien Chastanet; Ohio State
Men's épée details	Cooper Schumacher (New York (state)) St. John's	Justin Yoo (Pennsylvania) Penn	Wesley Johnson (New Jersey) Princeton
Men's épée details	Cooper Schumacher (New York (state)) St. John's	Justin Yoo (Pennsylvania) Penn	Ariel Simmons (Indiana) Notre Dame (H)
