= Women's team foil at the 2022 World Fencing Championships =

- Venue: Cairo Stadium Indoor Halls Complex
- Location: Cairo, Egypt
- Dates: 21–22 July
- Competitors: 96 from 24 nations
- Teams: 24

Medalists
gold medal	Arianna Errigo; Martina Favaretto; Francesca Palumbo; Alice Volpi	Italy
silver medal	Jacqueline Dubrovich; Lee Kiefer; Zander Rhodes; Maia Weintraub	United States
bronze medal	Anita Blaze; Solène Butruille; Pauline Ranvier; Ysaora Thibus	France

The Women's team foil competition at the 2022 World Fencing Championships was held on 21 and 22 July 2022.

== Draw ==
=== Finals ===
Semifinals
Italy	45
Japan	37
United States	45
France	35

Final
Italy	45
United States	27
Third place
Japan	34
France	40

=== Top half ===
==== Section 1 ====
Round of 32
Brazil	29
Austria	45
South Korea	45
United Arab Emirates	19

Round of 16
Italy	45
Austria	19
South Korea	27
Poland	39

Quarterfinals
Italy	45
Poland	26

==== Section 2 ====
Round of 32
Mexico	45
Egypt	43
Hong Kong	32
Great Britain	33

Round of 16
Canada	45
Mexico	20
Great Britain	26
Japan	40

Quarterfinals
Canada	28
Japan	45

=== Bottom half ===
==== Section 3 ====
Round of 32
Chile	18
Ukraine	45
Spain	45
Australia	16

Round of 16
United States	45
Ukraine	22
Spain	45
Hungary	31

Quarterfinals
United States	45
Spain	27

==== Section 4 ====
Round of 32
India	12
China	45
Singapore	45
Romania	39

Round of 16
Germany	41
China	45
Singapore	36
France	45

Quarterfinals
China	24
France	45

=== Placement rounds ===
==== 5–8th place bracket ====
5–8th place semifinals
Poland	35
Canada	38
Spain	45
China	44

Fifth place
Canada	45
Spain	21
Seventh place
Poland	38
China	27

==== 9–16th place bracket ====
9–16th place quarterfinals
Austria	45
South Korea	35
Mexico	31
Great Britain	43
Ukraine	32
Hungary	45
Germany	45
Singapore	23

9–12th place semifinals
Austria	45
Great Britain	25
Hungary	41
Germany	45

Ninth place
Austria	18
Germany	45
Eleventh place
Great Britain	28
Hungary	45

==== 13–16th place bracket ====
13–16th place semifinals
South Korea	45
Mexico	38
Ukraine	42
Singapore	45

13th place
South Korea	45
Singapore	41
15th place
Mexico	35
Ukraine	45

== Final ranking ==
Rank	Team
1st place, gold medalist(s)	Italy
2nd place, silver medalist(s)	United States
3rd place, bronze medalist(s)	France
4	Japan
5	Canada
6	Spain
7	Poland
8	China
9	Germany
10	Austria
11	Hungary
12	Great Britain
13	South Korea
14	Singapore
15	Ukraine
16	Mexico
17	Egypt
18	Hong Kong
19	Brazil
20	Romania
21	Chile
22	Australia
23	India
24	United Arab Emirates
