= Francesca Palumbo =

Italian fencer (born 1992)

Personal information
- Born: 10 February 1992 (age 34) Potenza, Italy

Fencing career
- Sport: Fencing
- Country: Italy
- Weapon: Foil
- Hand: left-handed
- Club: Frascati Scherma
- FIE ranking: current ranking
Medal record
Women's foil
Representing Italy
Olympic Games
Silver medal – second place	2024 Paris	Team
World Championships
Gold medal – first place	2022 Cairo	Team
Gold medal – first place	2023 Milan	Team
Silver medal – second place	2019 Budapest	Team
European Games
Gold medal – first place	2023 Kraków–Małopolska	Team
European Championships
Gold medal – first place	2022 Antalya	Team
Gold medal – first place	2023 Kraków	Team
Gold medal – first place	2024 Basel	Team
Bronze medal – third place	2019 Düsseldorf	Team
Bronze medal – third place	2023 Plovdiv	Individual
Universiade
Gold medal – first place	2015 Gwangju	Team
Gold medal – first place	2017 Taipei	Team
Silver medal – second place	2013 Kazan	Team

Francesca Palumbo (born 10 February 1992) is an Italian fencer who won one gold medal at the 2015 Summer Universiade. She also won the bronze medal at 2019 European Fencing Championships.

She competed at the 2022 European Fencing Championships held in Antalya, Turkey.

== Medal record ==
=== Olympic Games ===
Year	Location	Event	Position
2024	Paris, France	Team Women's Foil	2nd
