= Chiara Cini =

Italian fencer (born 1990)

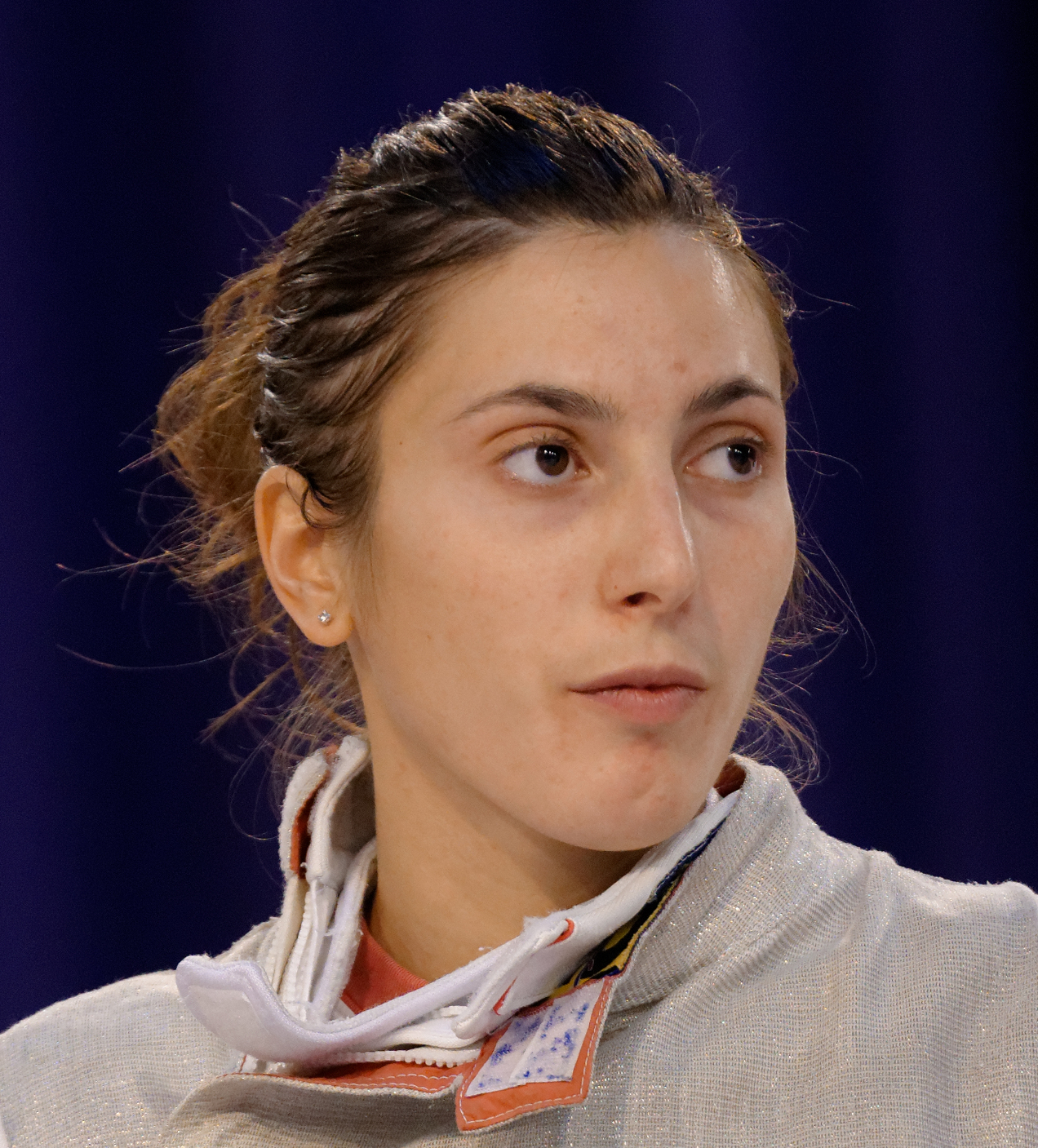
- Cini in 2014

Personal information
- Born: 29 December 1990 (age 35) Pisa, Italy
- Height: 1.64 m (5 ft 5 in)
- Weight: 53 kg (117 lb)

Fencing career
- Sport: Fencing
- Country: Italy
- Weapon: Foil
- Club: Fiamme Azzurre
Medal record
World Championships
| Silver medal – second place | 2018 Wuxi | Team foil |
European Games
| Bronze medal – third place | 2015 Baku | Team foil |
European Championships
| Gold medal – first place | 2018 Novi Sad | Team foil |

Chiara Cini (born 29 December 1990) is an Italian female fencer, who was silver medal at senior level at the World Fencing Championships.
