= Komaki Kikuchi =

Japanese fencer (born 1997)

Personal information
- Native name: 菊池小巻
- Born: 22 February 1997 (age 29) Kumamoto, Japan

Fencing career
- Sport: Fencing
- Country: Japan
- Weapon: Foil
- Hand: Left-handed
- FIE ranking: current ranking
Medal record
Women's foil
Representing Japan
Olympic Games
Bronze medal – third place	2024 Paris	Team
World Championships
Bronze medal – third place	2023 Milan	Team
Bronze medal – third place	2026 Hong Kong	Team
Asian Games
Gold medal – first place	2018 Jakarta	Team
Gold medal – first place	2026 Aichi-Nagoya	Team
Bronze medal – third place	2022 Hangzhou	Team
Asian Fencing Championships
Gold medal – first place	2019 Chiba	Team
Gold medal – first place	2024 Kuwait City	Team
Silver medal – second place	2024 Kuwait City	Individual

Komaki Kikuchi (born 22 February 1997) is a Japanese fencer. She won the gold medal in the women's team foil event at the 2018 Asian Games held in Jakarta, Indonesia.

In 2019, she won the gold medal in the women's team foil event at the Asian Fencing Championships held in Chiba, Japan. In the same year, she also competed in the women's foil event at the World Fencing Championships held in Budapest, Hungary. She was eliminated in her first match by Julia Walczyk of Poland.

At the 2024 Summer Olympics, Kikuchi won the bronze medal in the women's team foil event; it marked Japan's first ever medal in the event.

== Medal record ==
=== Olympic Games ===
Year	Location	Event	Position
2024	Paris, France	Team Women's Foil	3rd
