= Maia Weintraub =

American fencer (born 2002)

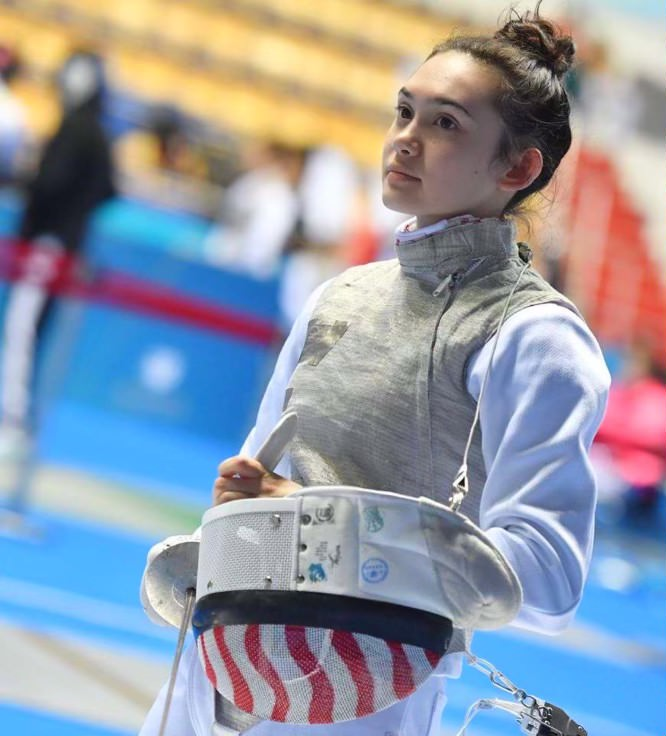
- Weintraub in 2020

Personal information
- Born: October 24, 2002 (age 23) Philadelphia, Pennsylvania, U.S.

Fencing career
- Sport: Fencing
- Country: United States
- Weapon: Foil
- Hand: right-handed
- Personal coach: Simon Gershon and Mark Masters
- FIE ranking: 13 (women's foil, August 2024)
Medal record
Women's foil
Representing United States
Olympic Games
Gold medal – first place	2024 Paris	Team
World Championships
Silver medal – second place	2022 Cairo	Team
Pan American Championships
Gold medal – first place	2024 Lima	Team
Silver medal – second place	2022 Asunción	Team
Silver medal – second place	2023 Lima	Individual
Silver medal – second place	2023 Lima	Team

Maia Mei Weintraub (born October 24, 2002) is an American foil fencer. She won the 2019 and 2023 USA Fencing Women's Foil National Championships, was ranked second in the world in 2021 in women's foil in the juniors, and won the 2022 NCAA national women's foil championship. Weintraub represented the United States at the 2024 Paris Olympics in the Women's team foil, where she won a gold medal.

== Early life ==
Weintraub was born and grew up in Philadelphia, Pennsylvania. She is Jewish, and is the daughter of Elizabeth Surin, a retired immigration attorney, an immigrant from Singapore, and Jason Weintraub, an entomologist, who specializes in moths and butterflies. Weintraub attended Friends Select School in Philadelphia.

== Fencing career ==
Weintraub fences at the Fencers Club, the Fencing Academy of Philadelphia, and Princeton University. Her coaches are Simon Gershon and Mark Masters.

=== Early years; national champion ===
Her first experience in fencing came at age nine, when she joined the Fencing Academy of Philadelphia at the suggestion of her uncles Adam and Joshua Weintraub, both former college fencers. A foil fencer, she won the foil gold medal at the Junior Olympics tournament in the 2017–18 season.

Weintraub won the U.S. national foil championship in April 2019, becoming the youngest person to accomplish the feat in nine years. Later that year, she placed third at the Junior World Cup, was ranked 8th in the world in foil in the cadets, and was in the top-32 at a Senior World Cup competition. She placed 16th at the 2020 Kazan Senior World Cup. She also won three gold medals at the 2019 European Maccabi Games for Jewish athletes.

=== 2021; NCAA champion ===
Weintraub was the runner-up at the 2021 U.S. national foil championship, and finished eighth in the individual event at the 2021 Junior World Championships and second in the team event. She traveled to Tokyo, Japan, for the 2020 Summer Olympics (held in 2021) as an alternate for the U.S. team, although she did not compete.

Weintraub was ranked second in the world in the junior category, and 64th in the senior category in August 2021.

She began attending Princeton University in 2021, where she is majoring in Ecology & Evolutionary Biology. Weintraub fenced for the Tigers; that season, as a rookie freshman she won the Ivy League title and the NCAA regional and national foil championships, and was named first-team All-Ivy League and first-team All-American.

=== 2022–23; national champion ===
Weintraub participated at the 2022 Junior and Senior World Championships, and won gold in the junior category in the team event and silver in the team event in the senior category.

In the 2022–23 college fencing season, as a sophomore Weintraub repeated as a first-team All-Ivy League and All-American selection, won the Ivy League title, placed second at the NCAA regional tournament, and was third in the NCAA national championship.

Weintraub won the USA Fencing national championship in 2023.

=== 2024–present; Paris Olympics Team Champion ===
In May 2024 Weintraub won the gold medal at the Hong Kong, China World Cup, in a 163-fencer event, defeating among others fellow American and reigning Olympic gold medalist Lee Kiefer and two-time world champion Italian Arianna Errigo. As of July 2024 she was ranked 4th among American women, and 13th in the world, in foil.

Weintraub represented the United States at the 2024 Paris Olympics in the Women's team foil event. She won a gold medal, winning both of the bouts she fenced by a combined score of 11–5 against silver medal Team Italy, which the US defeated by that same six-point difference, 45–39.

== Medal record ==
=== Olympic Games ===
Year	Location	Event	Position
2024	Paris, France	Team Women's Foil	1st

=== World Championship ===
Year	Location	Event	Position
2022	Le Caire, Egypt	Team Women's Foil	2nd

=== World Cup ===
Date	Location	Event	Position
2025-01-12	Hong Kong, China	Team Women's Foil	2nd

=== Pan American Championship ===
Year	Location	Event	Position
2022	Asunción, Paraguay	Team Women's Foil	2nd
2023	Lima, Peru	Individual Women's Foil	2nd
2023	Lima, Peru	Team Women's Foil	2nd
2024	Lima, Peru	Team Women's Foil	1st

== See also ==
- List of Jews in sports § Fencing
- List of Jewish Olympic medalists
- NCAA Fencing Championships
- List of USFA Division I National Champions
