= Choi Soo-yeon =

South Korean fencer (born 1990)

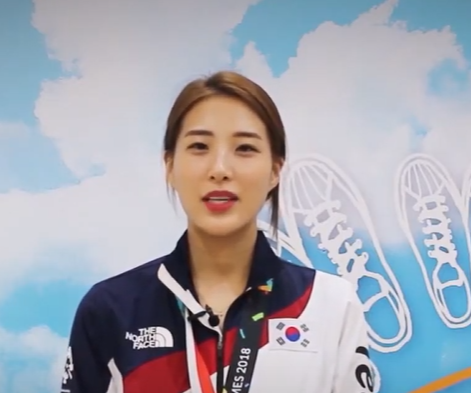
- Choi in 2018

Personal information
- Born: 23 November 1990 (age 35) Iksan, North Jeolla Province, South Korea

Fencing career
- Sport: Fencing
- Country: South Korea
- Weapon: Sabre
- Hand: right-handed
- National coach: Han Joo-yeol
- Club: Ansan City Government
- Head coach: Lee Hyun-soo
- FIE ranking: current ranking
Medal record
Olympic Games
Bronze medal – third place	2020 Tokyo	Team
World Championships
Bronze medal – third place	2018 Wuxi	Team
Bronze medal – third place	2019 Budapest	Team
Asian Championships
Silver medal – second place	2018 Bangkok	Team
Bronze medal – third place	2018 Bangkok	Individual

Choi Soo-yeon (Korean: 최수연; born 23 November 1990) is a South Korean right-handed sabre fencer, 2022 team Asian champion, 2022 individual Asian champion, and 2021 team Olympic bronze medalist.

== Medal record ==
=== Olympic Games ===
Year	Location	Event	Position
2021	Tokyo, Japan	Team Women's Sabre	3rd

=== World Championship ===
Year	Location	Event	Position
2018	Wuxi, China	Team Women's Sabre	3rd
2019	Budapest, Hungary	Team Women's Sabre	3rd

=== Asian Championship ===
Year	Location	Event	Position
2018	Bangkok, Thailand	Individual Women's Sabre	3rd
2018	Bangkok, Thailand	Team Women's Sabre	2nd
2019	Tokyo, Japan	Team Women's Sabre	2nd
2022	Seoul, South Korea	Individual Women's Sabre	1st
2022	Seoul, South Korea	Team Women's Sabre	1st

=== Grand Prix ===
Date	Location	Event	Position
2019-02-22	Cairo, Egypt	Individual Women's Sabre	2nd
