= Women's team foil at the 2025 World Fencing Championships =

- Venue: Olympic Palace
- Location: Tbilisi, Georgia
- Dates: 27 July (preliminaries); 28 July (finals)
- Competitors: 111 from 29 nations
- Teams: 29

Medalists
gold medal	Emily Jing; Lee Kiefer; Jaelyn Liu; Lauren Scruggs	United States
silver medal	Anita Blaze; Éva Lacheray; Morgane Patru; Pauline Ranvier	France
bronze medal	Anna Cristino; Arianna Errigo; Martina Favaretto; Alice Volpi	Italy

The Women's team foil competition at the 2025 World Fencing Championships was held on 27 and 28 July 2025.

== Draw ==
=== Finals ===
Semifinals
Italy	34
France	45
Japan	41
United States	45

Final
France	24
United States	45
Third place
Italy	45
Japan	30

=== Top half ===
==== Section 1 ====
Round of 32
Romania	45
Austria	31
Ukraine	45
Kazakhstan	13
Individual Neutral Athletes	45
South Korea	23

Round of 16
Italy	45
Romania	4
Ukraine	45
Individual Neutral Athletes	36

Quarterfinals
Italy	45
Ukraine	34

==== Section 2 ====
Round of 32
Canada	45
Iran	9
Colombia	33
Egypt	45
Singapore	45
Macau	29
Georgia	12
France	45

Round of 16
Canada	45
Egypt	25
Singapore	31
France	45

Quarterfinals
Canada	40
France	45

=== Bottom half ===
==== Section 3 ====
Round of 32
Brazil	36
Hong Kong	45
Hungary	45
Mexico	18
New Zealand	21
China	45

Round of 16
Japan	45
Hong Kong	36
Hungary	35
China	31

Quarterfinals
Japan	45
Hungary	32

==== Section 4 ====
Round of 32
Poland	42
Israel	34
India	20
Spain	45
Germany	45
Great Britain	21

Round of 16
Poland	25
Spain	45
Germany	26
United States	45

Quarterfinals
Spain	43
United States	45

=== Placement rounds ===
==== 5–8th place bracket ====
5–8th place semifinals
Ukraine	38
Canada	42
Hungary	44
Spain	45

Fifth place
Canada	45
Spain	40
Seventh place
Ukraine	39
Hungary	43

==== 9–16th place bracket ====
9–16th place quarterfinals
Romania	33
Individual Neutral Athletes	45
Egypt	39
Singapore	45
Hong Kong	45
China	44
Poland	22
Germany	36

9–12th place semifinals
Individual Neutral Athletes	45
Singapore	21
Hong Kong	33
Germany	45

Ninth place
Individual Neutral Athletes	45
Germany	40
Eleventh place
Singapore
Hong Kong	w/o

==== 13–16th place bracket ====
13–16th place semifinals
Romania	45
Egypt	33
China	43
Poland	30

13th place
Romania	45
China	33
15th place
Egypt	29
Poland	45

== Final ranking ==
Rank	Team
1st place, gold medalist(s)	United States
2nd place, silver medalist(s)	France
3rd place, bronze medalist(s)	Italy
4	Japan
5	Canada
6	Spain
7	Hungary
8	Ukraine
9	Individual Neutral Athletes
10	Germany
11	Hong Kong
12	Singapore
13	Romania
14	China
15	Poland
16	Egypt
17	South Korea
18	Austria
19	Great Britain
20	Brazil
21	Macau
22	Colombia
23	Mexico
24	India
25	Kazakhstan
26	Israel
27	New Zealand
28	Iran
29	Georgia
