= Nzingha Prescod =

American fencer

Nzingha Prescod OLY
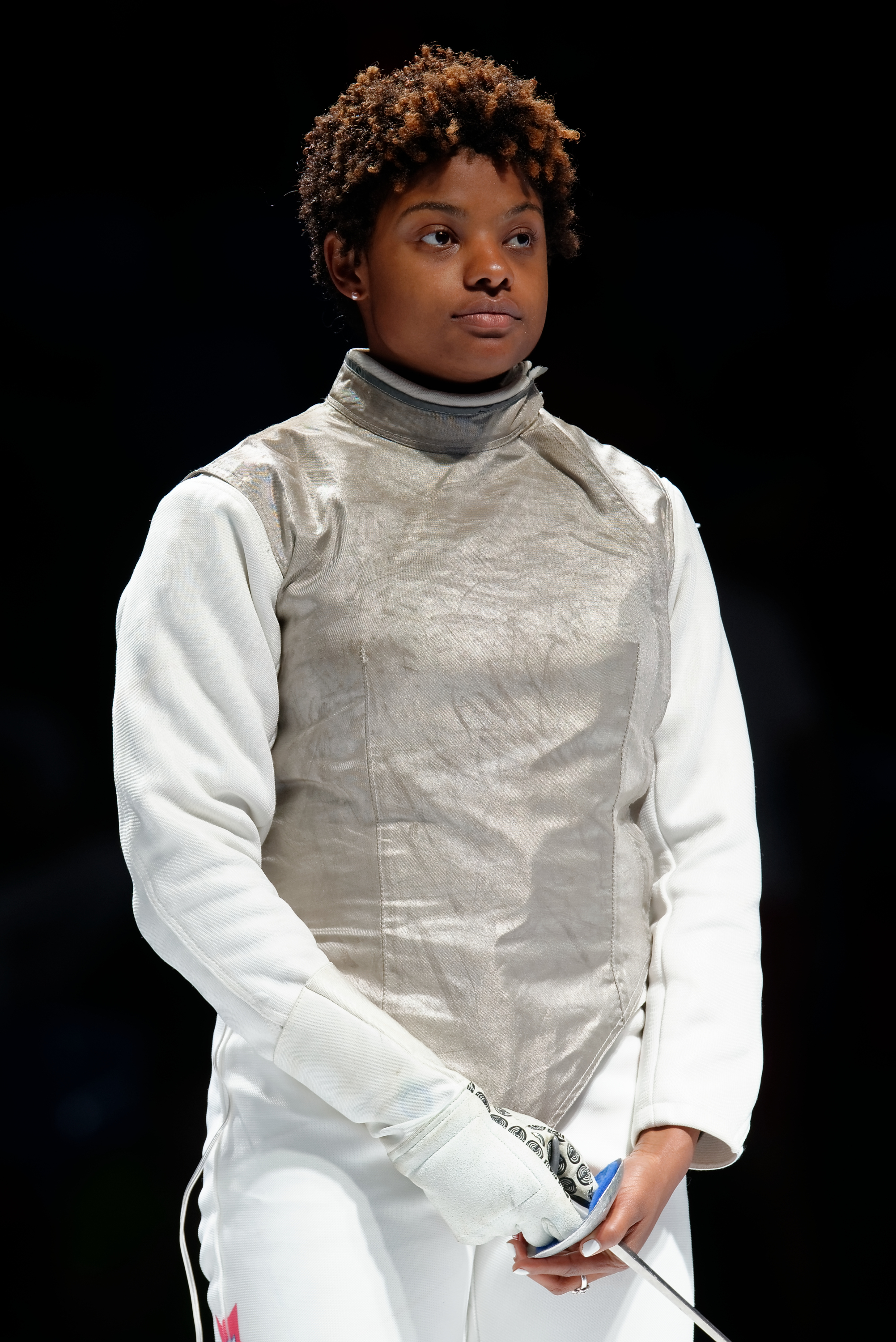
- Prescod in 2015

Personal information
- Born: August 14, 1992 (age 34) Brooklyn, New York
- Height: 1.60 m (5 ft 3 in)
- Weight: 59 kg (130 lb)

Fencing career
- Sport: Fencing
- Country: United States
- Weapon: Foil
- Hand: right-handed
- Club: Peter Westbrook Foundation
- Head coach: Buckie Leach
- FIE ranking: current ranking
Medal record
World Championships
Gold medal – first place	2018 Wuxi	Team
Silver medal – second place	2017 Leipzig	Team
Bronze medal – third place	2015 Moscow	Individual
Bronze medal – third place	2019 Budapest	Team
Pan American Games
Gold medal – first place	2011 Guadalajara	Team foil
Silver medal – second place	2011 Guadalajara	Individual foil
Silver medal – second place	2015 Toronto	Team foil

Nzingha Prescod (born August 14, 1992) is an American foil fencer, World Champion in foil at the 2008 and 2009 Cadet World Cups, bronze medalist at the 2015 World Fencing Championships, three-time medalist at the Pan American Games, and two-time Olympian. She has ranked as high as world # 5. Prescod was selected as an athlete director on the USA Fencing Board of Directors beginning in January 2021.

== Biography ==
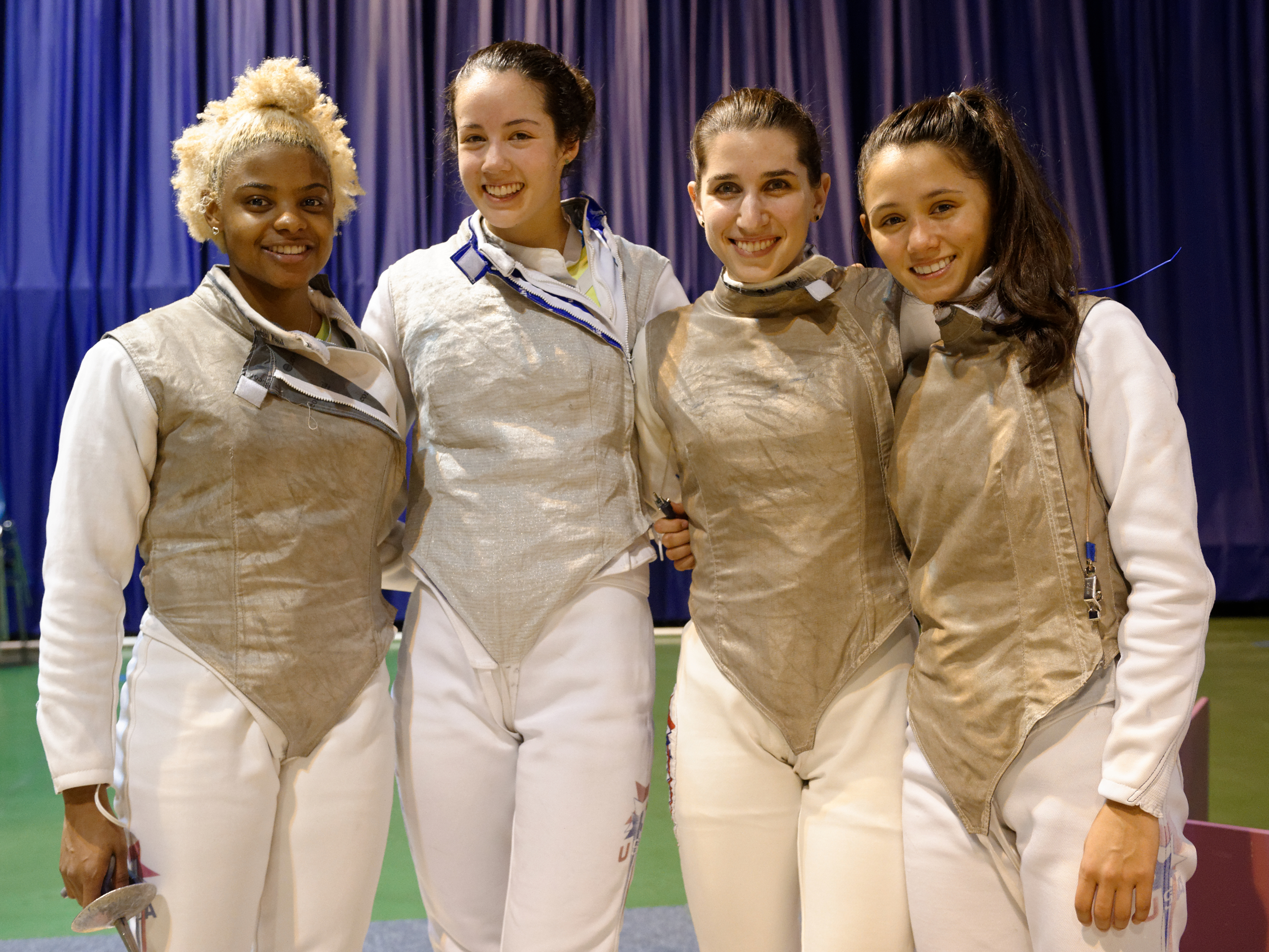
Team USA (from left: Nzingha Prescod, Sabrina Massialas, Nicole Ross, and Lee Kiefer) in 2015.

Prescod, a daughter of Marva Prescod and Homer Richardson, was born in New York City, and was named after Nzingha Mbande (a 17th-century queen in what is now Angola, who fought against colonization by the Portuguese Empire). Her mother is a Vincentian lawyer.

Prescod graduated from Stuyvesant High School in New York City in 2010. She graduated from Columbia University in 2015, majoring in political science, and fencing for the Columbia Lions fencing team. Fencing for Columbia, in 2010-11 she was named Ivy League Rookie of the Year, and First-Team All-Ivy League. She took the following year off to train for the Olympics. In 2012-13 she was again All-Ivy. In her Columbia career, she was 117–19 in foil bouts.

She was World Champion in foil at the 2008 and 2009 Cadet World Cups. Prescod placed third in women's foil at the 2011 Pan American Championships. In 2013, Prescod became the first US women's foil fencer to win a Grand Prix title when she won the gold medal at the Marseilla Foil Grand Prix in France. She finished third in the Division I Women's Foil at the 2015 January NAC.

Prescod competed in the individual women's foil event of the 2012 Summer Olympics, at 19 years of age, where she was defeated 10–15 in the table of 32 by Hungary's Aida Mohamed. In the team event Team USA lost to South Korea in the quarter-finals, and finished 6th after the placement matches.

She was a bronze medalist at the 2015 World Fencing Championships. Prescod fenced in the 2016 Rio Olympics at 23 years of age, and came in 11th.

In 2016 Prescod was one of eight Olympians selected for a six-month internship with EY (the former Ernst & Young) through its Women Athletes Business Network. As of 2020, she was working in data analytics for EY.

Prescod, suffering from avascular necrosis, trained and competed for a year in increasing pain. In January 2020, facing the necessity of hip replacement surgery, Prescod announced her retirement from competition.

Prescod was selected as an athlete director on the USA Fencing Board of Directors beginning on January 1, 2021, as the top vote-getter in a vote by athletes who represented the US at the Olympics or Paralympics, Pan American Games, or Senior World Championships. She said that in 2020 the organization's disciplinary decisions "reeked of lenience and favorability for the offender."

== See also ==
- List of USFA Division I National Champions
- List of USFA Hall of Fame members
