= Jacqueline Dubrovich =

American fencer (born 1994)

Jacqueline (Jackie) Dubrovich
Personal information
- Born: July 18, 1994 (age 32) Paterson, New Jersey, U.S.
- Height: 5 ft 9 in (175 cm)
- Weight: 150 lb (68 kg)

Fencing career
- Sport: Fencing
- Country: United States
- Weapon: Foil
- Hand: right-handed
- National coach: Buckie Leach; Ralf Bißdorf
- Club: Polaris Fencing Center
- Head coach: Brian Kaneshige
- FIE ranking: 11 (women's foil, August 2024)
Medal record
Women's foil
Representing the United States
Olympic Games
Gold medal – first place	2024 Paris	Team
World Championships
Silver medal – second place	2022 Cairo	Team
Bronze medal – third place	2019 Budapest	Team
Pan American Games
Gold medal – first place	2019 Lima	Team
Gold medal – first place	2023 Santiago	Team
Pan American Championships
Gold medal – first place	2024 Lima	Team
Silver medal – second place	2022 Asunción	Team
Silver medal – second place	2023 Lima	Team
Bronze medal – third place	2022 Asunción	Individual
Bronze medal – third place	2024 Lima	Individual

Jacqueline Dubrovich (/ˈdʒækəlɪn dəˈbroʊvɪtʃ/ JAK-ə-lin də-BROH-vitch; born July 18, 1994) is a two-time Olympic foil fencer for the United States. She represented the United States at the 2024 Summer Olympics in Paris, France in Women's Foil and won a historic gold medal as part of Team USA in Women's Team Foil.

In fall 2024, Jackie opened up Polaris Fencing Center in Orange, New Jersey, alongside her fiancé, Brian Kaneshige. She has been a resident of Maplewood, New Jersey.

== Early life ==
Born in Paterson, New Jersey, Dubrovich was raised in Riverdale, New Jersey, and attended Pompton Lakes High School. She traveled the world at a young age, competing in fencing and making multiple Cadet and Junior National Teams. Her parents emigrated to the United States from Belarus in the late 1980s, and she comes from Jewish descent.

She graduated from Columbia University in 2016 with degrees in psychology, Human Rights, and Russian Literature and Culture.

In her time at Columbia University, she was a two-time captain of the fencing team, four-time All-American (2 silvers and 1 bronze individually), four-time All-Ivy and two-time NCAA Team Champion in 2015 and 2016.

== Fencing career ==
Dubrovich represented the United States at the 2024 Summer Olympics in Paris, France, where she won the gold medal with her team in Women's Team Foil. This medal was the first time a USA Fencing team has won an Olympic gold medal in the history of the sport.

She represented the United States at the 2020 Summer Olympics in Tokyo, and her team finished 4th.

Dubrovich competed at the 2022 World Fencing Championships held in Cairo, Egypt, where she won a Team Silver medal.

Dubrovich participated in the 2019 World Fencing Championships, winning a Team Bronze medal.

Dubrovich has won three career Individual World Cup Medals—a Bronze at the 2021 St. Maur, France World Cup, a Bronze at the 2024 Cairo, Egypt World Cup and a Bronze at the Hong Kong World Cup.

== Medal record ==
=== Olympic Games ===
Year	Location	Event	Position
2024	Paris, France	Team Women's Foil	1st

=== World Championship ===
Year	Location	Event	Position
2019	Budapest, Hungary	Team Women's Foil	3rd
2022	Le Caire, Egypt	Team Women's Foil	2nd

=== World Cup ===
Date	Location	Event	Position
2022-12-09	Belgrade, Serbia	Team Women's Foil	2nd
2023-02-23	Cairo, Egypt	Team Women's Foil	2nd
2024-02-24	Cairo, Egypt	Individual Women's Foil	3rd
2024-05-02	Hong Kong, China	Individual Women's Foil	3rd

=== Pan American Championship ===
Year	Location	Event	Position
2022	Asunción, Paraguay	Individual Women's Foil	3rd
2022	Asunción, Paraguay	Team Women's Foil	2nd
2023	Lima, Peru	Team Women's Foil	2nd
2024	Lima, Peru	Individual Women's Foil	3rd
2024	Lima, Peru	Team Women's Foil	1st

== See also ==
- List of select Jewish fencers
- List of Jewish Olympic medalists
