= 2018 World Fencing Championships =

International fencing competition

- Dates: 19–27 July
- Host city: Wuxi, China
- Venue: Wuxi Sports Center Indoor Stadium

The 2018 World Fencing Championships was held from 19 to 27 July at 2018 in Wuxi, China.

== Host selection ==
On 23 November 2015, Wuxi beat the Japanese city of Fukuoka with 69 votes to 47.

== Schedule ==
Twelve events were held.

All times are local (UTC+8).

Date	Time	Round
19 July 2018	09:00	Women's épée qualification
19 July 2018	11:00	Men's sabre qualification
20 July 2018	08:30	Women's foil qualification
20 July 2018	10:40	Men's épée qualification
21 July 2018	08:30	Men's foil qualification
21 July 2018	10:40	Women's sabre qualification
22 July 2018	09:30	Women's épée
22 July 2018	10:40	Men's sabre
23 July 2018	08:30	Men's épée
23 July 2018	09:40	Women's foil
24 July 2018	08:30	Women's sabre
24 July 2018	10:10	Men's foil
24 July 2018	08:30	Women's épée team
24 July 2018	10:30	Men's sabre team
25 July 2018	08:30	Women's foil team
25 July 2018	09:20	Men's épée team
25 July 2018	12:20	Women's épée team
25 July 2018	13:10	Men's sabre team
26 July 2018	08:30	Men's foil team
26 July 2018	09:10	Women's sabre team
26 July 2018	11:30	Women's foil team
26 July 2018	12:30	Men's épée team
27 July 2018	11:00	Women's sabre team
27 July 2018	12:00	Men's foil team

== Medal summary ==
=== Medal table ===
Rank	Nation	Gold	Silver	Bronze	Total
1	Italy (ITA)	4	2	1	7
2	South Korea (KOR)	2	2	3	7
3	United States (USA)	2	2	2	6
4	France (FRA)	2	1	1	4
5	Russia (RUS)	1	2	4	7
6	Switzerland (SUI)	1	0	1	2
7	Great Britain (GBR)	0	1	0	1
7	Romania (ROU)	0	1	0	1
7	Venezuela (VEN)	0	1	0	1
10	Ukraine (UKR)	0	0	2	2
11	China (CHN)	0	0	1	1
11	Hungary (HUN)	0	0	1	1
11	Spain (ESP)	0	0	1	1
11	Tunisia (TUN)	0	0	1	1
Totals (14 entries)		12	12	18	42

=== Men's events ===
Event	Gold	Silver	Bronze
Individual épée	Yannick Borel; France	Rubén Limardo; Venezuela	Bohdan Nikishyn; Ukraine
Individual épée	Yannick Borel; France	Rubén Limardo; Venezuela	Roman Svichkar; Ukraine
Team épée	Switzerland; Max Heinzer; Lucas Malcotti; Michele Niggeler; Benjamin Steffen	South Korea; Jung Jin-sun; Kweon Young-jun; Park Kyoung-doo; Park Sang-young	Russia; Sergey Bida; Nikita Glazkov; Sergey Khodos; Pavel Sukhov
Individual foil	Alessio Foconi; Italy	Richard Kruse; Great Britain	Heo Jun; South Korea
Individual foil	Alessio Foconi; Italy	Richard Kruse; Great Britain	Carlos Llavador; Spain
Team foil	Italy; Giorgio Avola; Andrea Cassarà; Alessio Foconi; Daniele Garozzo	United States; Miles Chamley-Watson; Race Imboden; Alexander Massialas; Gerek Meinhardt	Russia; Timur Arslanov; Aleksey Cheremisinov; Timur Safin; Dmitry Zherebchenko
Individual sabre	Kim Jung-hwan; South Korea	Eli Dershwitz; United States	Kamil Ibragimov; Russia
Individual sabre	Kim Jung-hwan; South Korea	Eli Dershwitz; United States	Kim Jun-ho; South Korea
Team sabre	South Korea; Gu Bon-gil; Kim Jung-hwan; Kim Jun-ho; Oh Sang-uk	Italy; Enrico Berrè; Luca Curatoli; Aldo Montano; Luigi Samele	Hungary; Tamás Decsi; Csanád Gémesi; András Szatmári; Áron Szilágyi

=== Women's events ===
Event	Gold	Silver	Bronze
Individual épée	Mara Navarria; Italy	Ana Maria Brânză; Romania	Laura Staehli; Switzerland
Individual épée	Mara Navarria; Italy	Ana Maria Brânză; Romania	Courtney Hurley; United States
Team épée	United States; Katharine Holmes; Courtney Hurley; Kelley Hurley; Amanda Sirico	South Korea; Choi In-jeong; Kang Young-mi; Lee Hye-in; Shin A-lam	China; Lin Sheng; Sun Yiwen; Xu Chengzi; Zhu Mingye
Individual foil	Alice Volpi; Italy	Ysaora Thibus; France	Arianna Errigo; Italy
Individual foil	Alice Volpi; Italy	Ysaora Thibus; France	Inès Boubakri; Tunisia
Team foil	United States; Lee Kiefer; Margaret Lu; Nzingha Prescod; Nicole Ross	Italy; Chiara Cini; Arianna Errigo; Camilla Mancini; Alice Volpi	France; Anita Blaze; Astrid Guyart; Pauline Ranvier; Ysaora Thibus
Individual sabre	Sofia Pozdniakova; Russia	Sofya Velikaya; Russia	Anne-Elizabeth Stone; United States
Individual sabre	Sofia Pozdniakova; Russia	Sofya Velikaya; Russia	Yana Egorian; Russia
Team sabre	France; Cécilia Berder; Manon Brunet; Charlotte Lembach; Caroline Quéroli	Russia; Yana Egorian; Sofia Pozdniakova; Svetlana Sheveleva; Sofya Velikaya	South Korea; Choi Soo-yeon; Hwang Seo-na; Kim Ji-yeon; Yoon Ji-su
