= 2019 World Fencing Championships =

Fence competition in Budapest

- Dates: 15–23 July
- Host city: Budapest, Hungary
- Venue: SYMA Sports and Conference Centre

The 2019 World Fencing Championships was held from 15 to 23 July 2019 in Budapest, Hungary.

== Schedule ==
Twelve events were held.

All times are local (UTC+2).

Date	Time	Round
15 July 2019	09:00	Women's épée qualification
15 July 2019	13:00	Men's sabre qualification
16 July 2019	09:00	Women's foil qualification
16 July 2019	13:99	Men's épée qualification
17 July 2019	09:00	Men's foil qualification
17 July 2019	14:00	Women's sabre qualification
18 July 2019	18:40	Women's épée
18 July 2019	18:40	Men's sabre
19 July 2019	18:30	Men's épée
19 July 2019	18:30	Women's foil
20 July 2019	09:40	Women's épée team qualification
20 July 2019	10:40	Men's sabre team qualification
20 July 2019	18:30	Women's sabre
20 July 2019	18:30	Men's foil
21 July 2019	08:30	Men's épée team qualification
21 July 2019	08:30	Women's foil team qualification
21 July 2019	16:00	Women's épée team
21 July 2019	16:00	Men's sabre team
22 July 2019	09:40	Men's foil team qualification
22 July 2019	11:15	Women's sabre team qualification
22 July 2019	16:00	Women's foil team
22 July 2019	16:00	Men's épée team
23 July 2019	16:00	Women's sabre team
23 July 2019	16:00	Men's foil team

== Medal summary ==
=== Medal table ===
* Host nation (Hungary)

Rank	Nation	Gold	Silver	Bronze	Total
1	Russia	3	3	1	7
2	France	2	3	0	5
3	South Korea	2	0	2	4
4	Hungary*	1	2	0	3
5	Ukraine	1	1	2	4
6	China	1	1	0	2
7	United States	1	0	1	2
8	Brazil	1	0	0	1
9	Italy	0	1	7	8
10	Great Britain	0	1	0	1
11	Greece	0	0	1	1
11	Hong Kong	0	0	1	1
11	Iran	0	0	1	1
11	Romania	0	0	1	1
11	Switzerland	0	0	1	1
Totals (15 entries)		12	12	18	42

=== Men's events ===
Event	Gold	Silver	Bronze
Individual épée	Gergely Siklósi; Hungary	Sergey Bida; Russia	Andrea Santarelli; Italy
Individual épée	Gergely Siklósi; Hungary	Sergey Bida; Russia	Ihor Reizlin; Ukraine
Team épée	France; Alexandre Bardenet; Yannick Borel; Ronan Gustin; Daniel Jérent	Ukraine; Anatoliy Herey; Bohdan Nikishyn; Ihor Reizlin; Roman Svichkar	Switzerland; Max Heinzer; Lucas Malcotti; Michele Niggeler; Benjamin Steffen
Individual foil	Enzo Lefort; France	Marcus Mepstead; Great Britain	Son Young-ki; South Korea
Individual foil	Enzo Lefort; France	Marcus Mepstead; Great Britain	Dmitry Zherebchenko; Russia
Team foil	United States; Miles Chamley-Watson; Race Imboden; Alexander Massialas; Gerek Meinhardt	France; Erwann Le Pechoux; Enzo Lefort; Julien Mertine; Maxime Pauty	Italy; Giorgio Avola; Andrea Cassarà; Alessio Foconi; Daniele Garozzo
Individual sabre	Oh Sang-uk; South Korea	András Szatmári; Hungary	Mojtaba Abedini; Iran
Individual sabre	Oh Sang-uk; South Korea	András Szatmári; Hungary	Luca Curatoli; Italy
Team sabre	South Korea; Gu Bon-gil; Ha Han-sol; Kim Jun-ho; Oh Sang-uk	Hungary; Tamás Decsi; Csanád Gémesi; András Szatmári; Áron Szilágyi	Italy; Enrico Berrè; Luca Curatoli; Aldo Montano; Luigi Samele

=== Women's events ===
Event	Gold	Silver	Bronze
Individual épée	Nathalie Moellhausen; Brazil	Lin Sheng; China	Olena Kryvytska; Ukraine
Individual épée	Nathalie Moellhausen; Brazil	Lin Sheng; China	Vivian Kong; Hong Kong
Team épée	China; Lin Sheng; Sun Yiwen; Xu Anqi; Zhu Mingye	Russia; Tatyana Andryushina; Violetta Khrapina; Violetta Kolobova; Lyubov Shutova	Italy; Alice Clerici; Rossella Fiamingo; Federica Isola; Mara Navarria
Individual foil	Inna Deriglazova; Russia	Pauline Ranvier; France	Arianna Errigo; Italy
Individual foil	Inna Deriglazova; Russia	Pauline Ranvier; France	Elisa Di Francisca; Italy
Team foil	Russia; Inna Deriglazova; Anastasiia Ivanova; Larisa Korobeynikova; Adelina Zagidullina	Italy; Elisa Di Francisca; Arianna Errigo; Francesca Palumbo; Alice Volpi	United States; Jacqueline Dubrovich; Lee Kiefer; Nzingha Prescod; Nicole Ross
Individual sabre	Olha Kharlan; Ukraine	Sofya Velikaya; Russia	Theodora Goudoura; Greece
Individual sabre	Olha Kharlan; Ukraine	Sofya Velikaya; Russia	Bianca Pascu; Romania
Team sabre	Russia; Yana Egorian; Olga Nikitina; Sofia Pozdniakova; Sofya Velikaya	France; Cécilia Berder; Manon Brunet; Charlotte Lembach; Caroline Queroli	South Korea; Choi Soo-yeon; Hwang Seon-a; Kim Ji-yeon; Yoon Ji-su
