= Buckie Leach =

American fencer and coach (1958–2021)

Anthony Buckie Leach (1958 – August 14, 2021) was an American foil fencing coach and fencer.

== Biography ==
He began fencing at age 12 and coaching at age 20. A coach for over 40 years, his students have found success on both the national and international levels. His success with the Rochester Fencing Center garnered worldwide attention. He was the first to produce an American Fencing World Champion, and was an Olympic fencing coach in 1996, 2000, 2004, 2016, and 2020. He was inducted into the USA Fencing Hall of Fame in 2013.

His fencers won over 20 medals in Junior and Senior World Cup events as well as numerous National and NCAA championships. In 2021, his student Lee Kiefer won the gold medal in the Tokyo Olympics, the first American to achieve this in Olympic foil.

His students include past Olympians Felicia and Iris Zimmermann, and 2004 Olympian Erinn Smart. Felicia, Iris, and Erinn made up the team that captured bronze at the 2001 World Championships and just missed medaling at the 2000 Olympic Games with their 4th-place finish. During that time he was also the United States women's foil national coach.

He created the Blackstar Coaching clinics, a teaching program for fencing coaches in the United States.

He coached at the University of Notre Dame in Indiana for five seasons. Leach died in a motorcycle accident in Potter County, Pennsylvania shortly after returning from coaching at the Tokyo Olympics on August 14, 2021. Despite wearing a helmet, he was thrown from his Ducati Supersport after hitting a deer and succumbed to injuries.

== See also ==
- List of USFA Hall of Fame members
