= Arianna Errigo =

Italian foil and sabre fencer

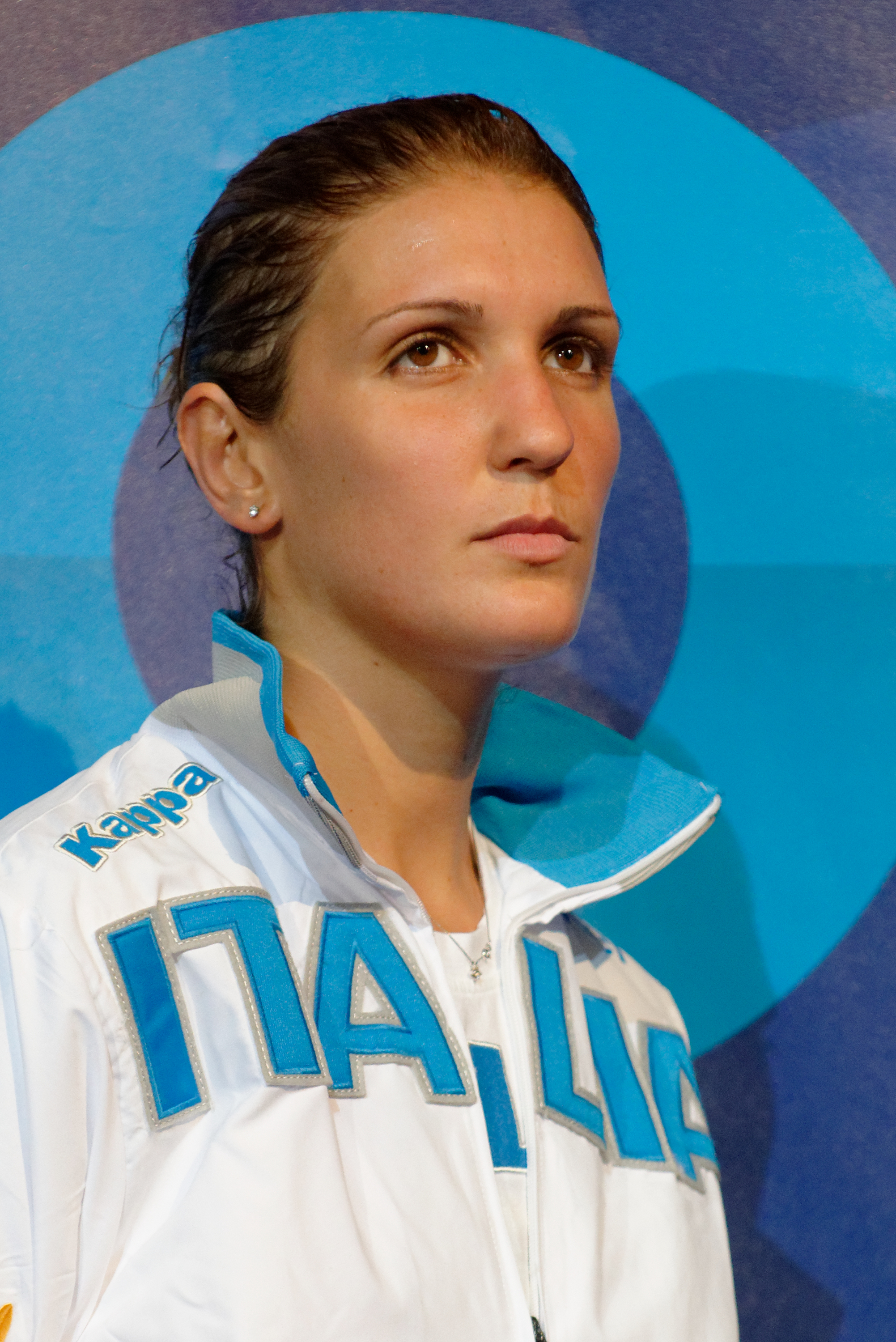
- Errigo in 2013

Personal information
- Born: 6 June 1988 (age 38) Monza, Italy
- Height: 1.81 m (5 ft 11 in)
- Weight: 64 kg (141 lb)

Fencing career
- Sport: Fencing
- Weapon: Foil, sabre
- Hand: left-handed
- Club: CS Carabinieri
- FIE ranking: current ranking
Medal record
Women's foil
Representing Italy
Event	1st	2nd	3rd
Olympic Games	1	2	1
World Fencing Championships	11	8	6
European Fencing Championships	16	4	4
Total	28	14	11
Olympic Games
Gold medal – first place	2012 London	Team
Silver medal – second place	2012 London	Individual
Silver medal – second place	2024 Paris	Team
Bronze medal – third place	2020 Tokyo	Team
World Championships
Gold medal – first place	2009 Antalya	Team
Gold medal – first place	2010 Paris	Team
Gold medal – first place	2013 Budapest	Individual
Gold medal – first place	2013 Budapest	Team
Gold medal – first place	2014 Kazan	Individual
Gold medal – first place	2014 Kazan	Team
Gold medal – first place	2015 Moscow	Team
Gold medal – first place	2017 Leipzig	Team
Gold medal – first place	2022 Cairo	Team
Gold medal – first place	2023 Milan	Team
Gold medal – first place	2026 Hong Kong	Team
Silver medal – second place	2010 Paris	Individual
Silver medal – second place	2011 Catania	Team
Silver medal – second place	2016 Rio de Janeiro	Team
Silver medal – second place	2018 Wuxi	Team
Silver medal – second place	2019 Budapest	Team
Silver medal – second place	2022 Cairo	Individual
Silver medal – second place	2023 Milan	Individual
Silver medal – second place	2026 Hong Kong	Individual
Bronze medal – third place	2009 Antalya	Individual
Bronze medal – third place	2015 Moscow	Individual
Bronze medal – third place	2017 Leipzig	Individual
Bronze medal – third place	2018 Wuxi	Individual
Bronze medal – third place	2019 Budapest	Individual
Bronze medal – third place	2025 Tbilisi	Team
European Championships
Gold medal – first place	2009 Plovdiv	Team
Gold medal – first place	2010 Leipzig	Team
Gold medal – first place	2011 Sheffield	Team
Gold medal – first place	2012 Legnano	Team
Gold medal – first place	2013 Zagreb	Team
Gold medal – first place	2014 Strasbourg	Team
Gold medal – first place	2015 Montreux	Team
Gold medal – first place	2016 Toruń	Individual
Gold medal – first place	2017 Tbilisi	Individual
Gold medal – first place	2017 Tbilisi	Team
Gold medal – first place	2018 Novi Sad	Team
Gold medal – first place	2022 Antalya	Team
Gold medal – first place	2024 Basel	Individual
Gold medal – first place	2024 Basel	Team
Gold medal – first place	2025 Genoa	Team
Gold medal – first place	2026 Antony	Team
Silver medal – second place	2016 Toruń	Team
Silver medal – second place	2018 Novi Sad	Individual
Silver medal – second place	2022 Antalya	Individual
Silver medal – second place	2026 Antony	Individual
Bronze medal – third place	2009 Plovdiv	Individual
Bronze medal – third place	2012 Legnano	Individual
Bronze medal – third place	2015 Montreux	Individual
Bronze medal – third place	2019 Düsseldorf	Team

Arianna Errigo (born 6 June 1988) is an Italian left-handed foil and sabre fencer.

Errigo is a nine-time team European champion, two-time individual European champion, six-time team world champion, and two-time individual world champion. Known for her aggressive and fast fencing, she is regarded as one of the greatest fencers of all time.

A three-time Olympian, Errigo is a 2021 team Olympic bronze medalist, 2012 team Olympic champion, and 2012 individual Olympic silver medalist. Errigo competed in the 2012 London Olympic Games, the 2016 Rio de Janeiro Olympic Games, and the 2020 Tokyo Olympic Games.

Errigo is an athlete of the Centro Sportivo Carabinieri.

== Biography ==
In the women's individual foil at the 2012 Summer Olympics, she denied her compatriot Valentina Vezzali her fourth successive gold medal in the competition by defeating her 15–12 in the all-Italian semi-finals. She went on to win the silver medal in the event, losing in extra time to another compatriot Elisa Di Francisca.

At the 2013 and 2014 World Championships, Errigo won 2 consecutive gold medals in the individual event.

After the 2016 Rio de Janeiro Olympic Games, where she failed to win a medal, Errigo announced an interest in qualifying for both foil and sabre at the 2020 Tokyo Olympic Games. She later won a silver medal at the sabre Grand Prix in Cancún, Mexico, in December 2017.

On 13 June 2024, she received the tricolor flag from the president of Italy, Sergio Mattarella, together with the Olympic high jump champion Gianmarco Tamberi for the Paris 2024 Olympic Games.

== Medal record ==
=== Olympic Games ===
Year	Location	Event	Position
2012	London, United Kingdom	Individual Women's Foil	2nd
2012	London, United Kingdom	Team Women's Foil	1st
2021	Tokyo, Japan	Team Women's Foil	3rd
2024	Paris, France	Team Women's Foil	2nd

=== World Championship ===
Year	Location	Event	Position
2009	Antalya, Turkey	Individual Women's Foil	3rd
2009	Antalya, Turkey	Team Women's Foil	1st
2010	Paris, France	Individual Women's Foil	2nd
2010	Paris, France	Team Women's Foil	1st
2011	Catania, Italy	Team Women's Foil	2nd
2013	Budapest, Hungary	Individual Women's Foil	1st
2013	Budapest, Hungary	Team Women's Foil	1st
2014	Kazan, Russia	Individual Women's Foil	1st
2014	Kazan, Russia	Team Women's Foil	1st
2015	Moscow, Russia	Individual Women's Foil	3rd
2015	Moscow, Russia	Team Women's Foil	1st
2016	Rio de Janeiro, Brazil	Team Women's Foil	2nd
2017	Leipzig, Germany	Individual Women's Foil	3rd
2017	Paris, France	Team Women's Foil	1st
2018	Wuxi, China	Individual Women's Foil	3rd
2018	Wuxi, China	Team Women's Foil	2nd
2019	Budapest, Hungary	Individual Women's Foil	3rd
2019	Budapest, Hungary	Team Women's Foil	2nd
2022	Cairo, Egypt	Individual Women's Foil	2nd
2022	Cairo, Egypt	Team Women's Foil	1st
2023	Milan, Italy	Individual Women's Foil	2nd
2023	Milan, Italy	Team Women's Foil	1st
2025	(Georgia (country)) Tbilisi, Georgia	Team Women's Foil	3rd

=== European Championship ===
Year	Location	Event	Position
2009	Plovdiv, Bulgaria	Individual Women's Foil	3rd
2009	Plovdiv, Bulgaria	Team Women's Foil	1st
2010	Leipzig, Germany	Team Women's Foil	1st
2011	Sheffield, United Kingdom	Team Women's Foil	1st
2012	Legnano, Italy	Individual Women's Foil	3rd
2012	Legnano, Italy	Team Women's Foil	1st
2013	Zagreb, Croatia	Team Women's Foil	1st
2014	Strasbourg, France	Team Women's Foil	1st
2015	Montreux, Switzerland	Individual Women's Foil	3rd
2015	Montreux, Switzerland	Team Women's Foil	1st
2016	Toruń, Poland	Individual Women's Foil	1st
2016	Toruń, Poland	Team Women's Foil	2nd
2017	(Georgia (country)) Tbilisi, Georgia	Individual Women's Foil	1st
2017	(Georgia (country)) Tbilisi, Georgia	Team Women's Foil	1st
2018	Novi Sad, Serbia	Individual Women's Foil	2nd
2018	Novi Sad, Serbia	Team Women's Foil	1st
2019	Düsseldorf, Germany	Team Women's Foil	3rd
2022	Antalya, Turkey	Individual Women's Foil	2nd
2022	Antalya, Turkey	Team Women's Foil	1st

=== Grand Prix ===
Date	Location	Event	Position
27 February 2009	Gdańsk, Poland	Individual Women's Foil	1st
15 May 2009	Seoul, South Korea	Individual Women's Foil	2nd
22 May 2009	St. Petersburg, Russia	Individual Women's Foil	2nd
26 February 2010	Gdańsk, Poland	Individual Women's Foil	2nd
25 February 2011	Gdańsk, Poland	Individual Women's Foil	3rd
21 May 2011	Seoul, South Korea	Individual Women's Foil	2nd
28 April 2012	Marseille, France	Individual Women's Foil	2nd
19 May 2012	Seoul, South Korea	Individual Women's Foil	3rd
2 January 2013	Gdańsk, Poland	Individual Women's Foil	1st
31 January 2014	Gdańsk, Poland	Individual Women's Foil	1st
26 April 2014	Seoul, South Korea	Individual Women's Foil	2nd
23 May 2014	Marseille, France	Individual Women's Foil	1st
28 November 2014	Turin, Italy	Individual Women's Foil	1st
27 November 2015	Turin, Italy	Individual Women's Foil	3rd
3 November 2016	Havana, Cuba	Individual Women's Foil	1st
6 March 2016	Shanghai, China	Individual Women's Foil	1st
12 February 2016	Turin, Italy	Individual Women's Foil	3rd
17 March 2017	(United States) Long Beach, California	Individual Women's Foil	3rd
12 January 2017	Turin, Italy	Individual Women's Foil	3rd
15 December 2017	Cancún, Mexico	Individual Women's Sabre	2nd
17 May 2019	Shanghai, China	Individual Women's Foil	3rd

=== World Cup ===
Date	Location	Event	Position
21 February 2009	Leipzig, Germany	Individual Women's Foil	3rd
21 June 2009	(United States) Dallas, Texas	Individual Women's Foil	1st
13 February 2010	Salzburg, Austria	Individual Women's Foil	3rd
5 March 2010	Shanghai, China	Individual Women's Foil	3rd
6 July 2010	Havana, Cuba	Individual Women's Foil	2nd
3 November 2011	Turin, Italy	Individual Women's Foil	2nd
6 May 2011	St. Petersburg, Russia	Individual Women's Foil	2nd
2 October 2012	Tauberbischofsheim, Germany	Individual Women's Foil	3rd
23 March 2012	Budapest, Hungary	Individual Women's Foil	3rd
6 March 2012	St. Petersburg, Russia	Individual Women's Foil	2nd
2 August 2013	Budapest, Hungary	Individual Women's Foil	3rd
3 August 2013	Tauberbischofsheim, Germany	Individual Women's Foil	3rd
22 March 2013	Turin, Italy	Individual Women's Foil	1st
5 March 2013	Shanghai, China	Individual Women's Foil	3rd
2 July 2014	Budapest, Hungary	Individual Women's Foil	3rd
26 February 2014	St. Petersburg, Russia	Individual Women's Foil	1st
21 March 2014	Turin, Italy	Individual Women's Foil	3rd
5 February 2014	Shanghai, China	Individual Women's Foil	1st
17 October 2014	Cancún, Mexico	Individual Women's Foil	1st
11 July 2014	Saint-Maur-des-Fossés, France	Individual Women's Foil	1st
2 June 2015	Algier, Algeria	Individual Women's Foil	2nd
5 January 2015	Tauberbischofsheim, Germany	Individual Women's Foil	2nd
11 June 2015	Saint-Maur-des-Fossés, France	Individual Women's Foil	1st
15 January 2016	Gdańsk, Poland	Individual Women's Foil	1st
2 May 2016	Algier, Algeria	Individual Women's Foil	3rd
5 February 2016	Tauberbischofsheim, Germany	Individual Women's Foil	2nd
14 October 2016	Cancún, Mexico	Individual Women's Foil	1st
11 April 2016	Saint-Maur-des-Fossés, France	Individual Women's Foil	3rd
13 January 2017	Algier, Algeria	Individual Women's Foil	3rd
28 April 2017	Tauberbischofsheim, Germany	Individual Women's Foil	2nd
13 October 2017	Cancún, Mexico	Individual Women's Foil	3rd
1 November 2019	Katowice, Poland	Individual Women's Foil	3rd
22 November 2019	Cairo, Egypt	Individual Women's Foil	1st

== Honours and awards ==
Italy: Commendatore Ordine al Merito della Repubblica Italiana (Italian for: Commander Order of Merit of the Italian Republic), 5 June 2013.

Olympic Games
Preceded by Elia Viviani; Jessica Rossi	Flagbearer for Italy; París 2024; With: Gianmarco Tamberi	Succeeded by Incumbent
