= Margaret Lu =

American fencer (born 1994)

Personal information
- Nationality: American
- Born: March 21, 1994 (age 32) Manila, Philippines

Fencing career
- Sport: Fencing
- Country: United States
- Weapon: Foil
Medal record
World Fencing Championships
Gold medal – first place	2018 Wuxi	Team
Silver medal – second place	2017 Leipzig	Team
Pan American Championships
Gold medal – first place	2013 Cartagena	Team
Gold medal – first place	2015 Santiago	Team
Gold medal – first place	2017 Montreal	Team
Gold medal – first place	2018 Havana	Team
Bronze medal – third place	2013 Cartagena	Individual
Bronze medal – third place	2017 Montreal	Individual

Margaret Lu (born March 21, 1994) is an American fencer.

Lu has participated in the World Fencing Championships several times, winning a silver medal in 2017 and a gold medal in 2018, both in the team events.

She won gold medals at the Pan American Fencing Championships in 2013, 2015, 2017 and 2018, all of which were in the team foil events. She won bronze medals in the individual events in 2013 and 2017.

She fenced for the Columbia Lions fencing team. Lu graduated from Columbia University in 2017.
