= Pauline Ranvier =

French fencer (born 1994)

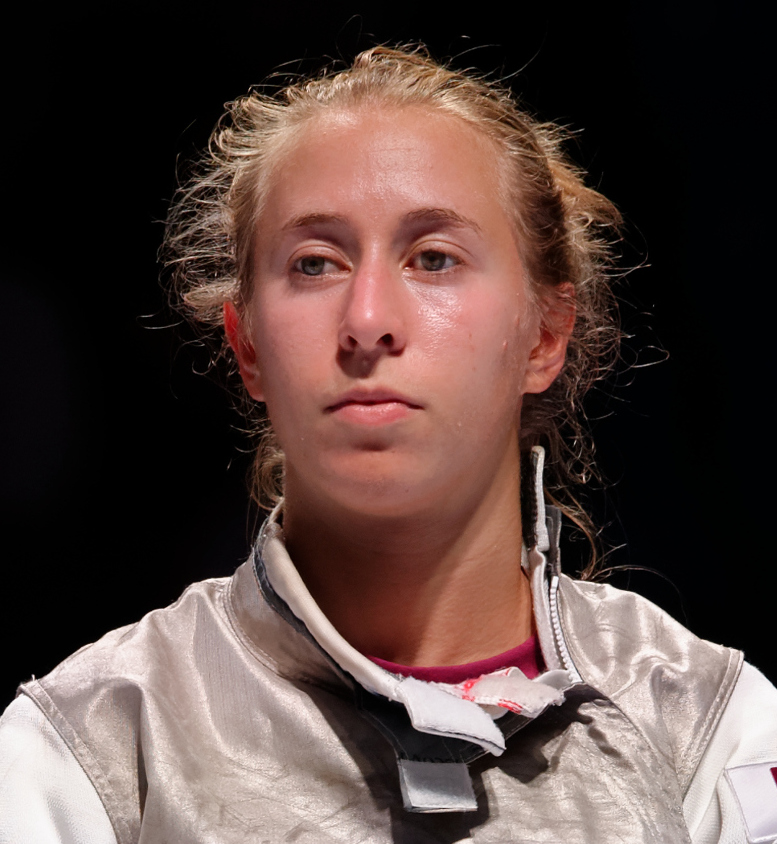
- Ranvier in 2015

Personal information
- Born: 14 April 1994 (age 32) Paris, France
- Height: 1.74 m (5 ft 9 in)
- Weight: 61 kg (134 lb)

Fencing career
- Sport: Fencing
- Country: France
- Weapon: Foil
- Hand: right-handed
- Club: Melun Val de Seine
- FIE ranking: current ranking
Medal record
Women's foil
Representing France
Olympic Games
Silver medal – second place	2020 Tokyo	Team
World Championships
Silver medal – second place	2019 Budapest	Individual
Silver medal – second place	2023 Milan	Team
Silver medal – second place	2025 Tbilisi	Individual
Silver medal – second place	2025 Tbilisi	Team
Bronze medal – third place	2015 Moscow	Team
Bronze medal – third place	2016 Rio de Janeiro	Team
Bronze medal – third place	2018 Wuxi	Team
Bronze medal – third place	2022 Cairo	Team
European Games
Silver medal – second place	2023 Kraków–Małopolska	Team
European Championships
Silver medal – second place	2019 Düsseldorf	Team
Silver medal – second place	2022 Antalya	Team
Silver medal – second place	2023 Kraków	Team
Silver medal – second place	2025 Genoa	Team
Silver medal – second place	2026 Antony	Team
Bronze medal – third place	2015 Montreaux	Team
Bronze medal – third place	2016 Toruń	Team
Bronze medal – third place	2018 Novi Sad	Team
Military World Games
Silver medal – second place	2019 Wuhan	Individual

Pauline Ranvier (born 14 April 1994) is a French right-handed foil fencer and 2021 team Olympic silver medalist.

== Medal record ==
=== Olympic Games ===
Year	Location	Event	Position
2021	Tokyo, Japan	Team Women's Foil	2nd

=== World Championship ===
Year	Location	Event	Position
2015	Moscow, Russia	Team Women's Foil	3rd
2016	Rio de Janeiro, Brazil	Team Women's Foil	3rd
2018	Wuxi, China	Team Women's Foil	3rd
2019	Budapest, Hungary	Individual Women's Foil	2nd

=== European Championship ===
Year	Location	Event	Position
2015	Montreux, Switzerland	Team Women's Foil	3rd
2016	Toruń, Poland	Team Women's Foil	3rd
2018	Novi Sad, Serbia	Team Women's Foil	3rd
2019	Düsseldorf, Germany	Team Women's Foil	2nd

=== World Cup ===
Date	Location	Event	Position
2 March 2017	Gdańsk, Poland	Individual Women's Foil	2nd
