= Fencing at the 2015 Pan American Games =

- Fencing pictogram for the games
- Venue: CIBC Pan Am/Parapan Am Aquatics Centre and Field House
- Dates: July 20–25
- No. of events: 12 (6 men, 6 women)
- Competitors: 155 from 17 nations

Fencing competitions at the 2015 Pan American Games in Toronto will be held from July 20 to 25 at the Toronto Pan Am Sports Centre (CIBC Pan Am/Parapan Am Aquatics Centre and Field House). Due to naming rights, the arena was known as the latter for the duration of the games. A total of twelve fencing events will be held: six each for men and women.

== Competition schedule ==
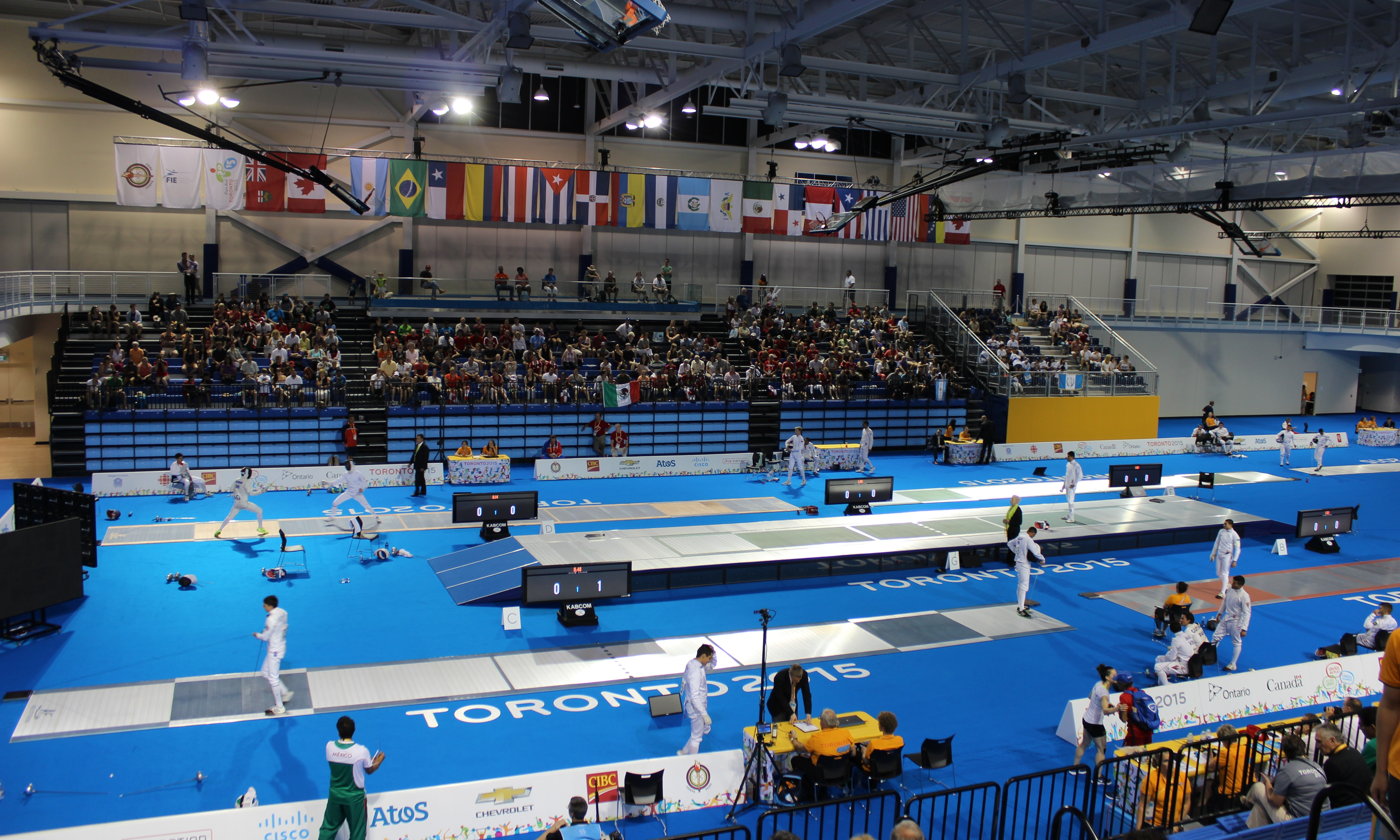
Fencing competition at the CIBC Pan Am/Parapan Am Aquatics Centre and Field House.

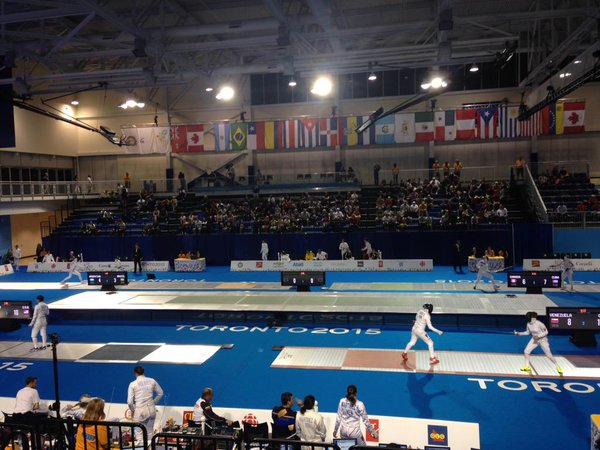
Fencing competition at the CIBC Pan Am/Parapan Am Aquatics Centre and Field House.

The following is the competition schedule for the fencing competitions:

Q	Qualifications	E	Eliminations	¼	Quarterfinals	½	Semifinals	B	Bronze medal match	F	Final

Event↓/Date →	Mon 20			Tue 21			Wed 22			Thu 23				Fri 24				Sat 25			
Men's individual épée	Q	E	F																		
Men's team épée										¼	½	B	F								
Men's individual foil				Q	E	F															
Men's team foil														¼	½	B	F				
Men's individual sabre							Q	E	F												
Men's team sabre																		¼	½	B	F
Women's individual épée							Q	E	F												
Women's team épée																		¼	½	B	F
Women's individual foil	Q	E	F																		
Women's team foil										¼	½	B	F								
Women's individual sabre				Q	E	F															
Women's team sabre														¼	½	B	F				

== Medal table ==
* Host nation (Canada)

Rank	Nation	Gold	Silver	Bronze	Total
1	United States	9	3	2	14
2	Venezuela	2	2	2	6
3	Canada*	1	2	3	6
4	Brazil	0	1	4	5
5	Argentina	0	1	3	4
5	Mexico	0	1	3	4
7	Colombia	0	1	0	1
7	Dominican Republic	0	1	0	1
9	Cuba	0	0	1	1
Totals (9 entries)		12	12	18	42

== Medalists ==
=== Men's events ===
Event	Gold	Silver	Bronze
Individual épée	Rubén Limardo; Venezuela	José Domínguez; Argentina	Hugues Boisvert-Simard; Canada
Individual épée	Rubén Limardo; Venezuela	José Domínguez; Argentina	Jason Pryor; United States
Team épée	Venezuela; Rubén Limardo; Francisco Limardo; Silvio Fernández	United States; Yeisser Ramirez; Jason Pryor; Benjamin Bratton	Cuba; Yunior Reytor; Reynier Henrique; Ringo Quintero
Individual foil	Alexander Massialas; United States	Gerek Meinhardt; United States	Ghislain Perrier; Brazil
Individual foil	Alexander Massialas; United States	Gerek Meinhardt; United States	Daniel Gómez; Mexico
Team foil	United States; Miles Chamley-Watson; Alexander Massialas; Gerek Meinhardt	Brazil; Ghislain Perrier; Fernando Scavasin; Guilherme Toldo	Mexico; Raul Arizaga; Jesús Beltran; Daniel Gómez
Individual sabre	Eli Dershwitz; United States	Joseph Polossifakis; Canada	Renzo Agresta; Brazil
Individual sabre	Eli Dershwitz; United States	Joseph Polossifakis; Canada	Ricardo Bustamante; Argentina
Team sabre	United States; Eli Dershwitz; Daryl Homer; Jeff Spear	Canada; Shaul Gordon; Joseph Polossifakis; Mark Peros	Argentina; Ricardo Bustamante; Pascual Di Tella; Stefano Lucchetti

=== Women's events ===
Event	Gold	Silver	Bronze
Individual épée	Katharine Holmes; United States	Violeta Ramírez Peguero; Dominican Republic	Nathalie Moellhausen; Brazil
Individual épée	Katharine Holmes; United States	Violeta Ramírez Peguero; Dominican Republic	María Martínez; Venezuela
Team épée	United States; Anna van Brummen; Katharine Holmes; Katarzyna Trzopek	Venezuela; María Martínez; Eliana Lugo; Dayana Martinez	Brazil; Nathalie Moellhausen; Amanda Simeão; Rayssa Costa
Individual foil	Lee Kiefer; United States	Saskia Loretta Garcia; Colombia	Alanna Goldie; Canada
Individual foil	Lee Kiefer; United States	Saskia Loretta Garcia; Colombia	Nicole Ross; United States
Team foil	Canada; Alanna Goldie; Eleanor Harvey; Kelleigh Ryan	United States; Lee Kiefer; Nzingha Prescod; Nicole Ross	Mexico; Denisse Hernández; Nataly Michel; Melissa Rebolledo
Individual sabre	Dagmara Wozniak; United States	Alejandra Benítez; Venezuela	Gabriella Page; Canada
Individual sabre	Dagmara Wozniak; United States	Alejandra Benítez; Venezuela	María Belén Pérez Maurice; Argentina
Team sabre	United States; Ibtihaj Muhammad; Dagmara Wozniak; Mariel Zagunis	Mexico; Úrsula González; Paola Pliego; Julieta Toledo	Venezuela; Alejandra Benítez; Milagros Pastran; Shia Rodríguez

== Participating nations ==
A total of 17 countries have qualified athletes. The number of athletes a nation entered is in parentheses beside the name of the country.

- Argentina (14)
- Brazil (18)
- Canada (18)
- Chile (10)
- Colombia (13)
- Costa Rica (1)
- Cuba (14)
- Dominican Republic (6)
- El Salvador (3)
- Guatemala (1)
- Mexico (15)
- Panama (1)
- Peru (1)
- Puerto Rico (3)
- United States (18)
- Venezuela (18)
- Virgin Islands (1)

== Qualification ==
A total of 156 fencers qualified to compete at the games. Each nation could enter a team of up to eighteen fencers (a team consisting of three athletes in each event). A maximum of two fencers per country could be entered in the individual events, and one team in the team events. All qualification was done at the 2015 Pan American Championships, where the top 7 teams plus two individuals in each event will qualify. Hosts Canada are automatically qualified with a full team of 18 athletes.

== See also ==
- Fencing at the 2016 Summer Olympics
