= Women's foil at the 2015 World Fencing Championships =

- Venue: Olympic Stadium
- Location: Moscow, Russia
- Dates: 15–16 July

Medalists
| gold medal | Inna Deriglazova | Russia |
| silver medal | Aida Shanayeva | Russia |
| bronze medal | Arianna Errigo | Italy |
| bronze medal | Nzingha Prescod | United States |

The Women's foil event of the 2015 World Fencing Championships was held on 16 July 2015. The qualification was held on 15 July 2015.

== Draw ==
=== Finals ===
Semi-finals
(Italy) Arianna Errigo | 13
(Russia) Inna Deriglazova | 15
(Russia) Aida Shanayeva | 15
(United States) Nzingha Prescod | 7

Final
(Russia) Inna Deriglazova | 15
(Russia) Aida Shanayeva | 11

=== Top half ===
==== Section 1 ====
Round of 64
1 | (Italy) Arianna Errigo | 15
64 | (China) Liu Yongshi | 4
33 | (Algeria) Anissa Khelfaoui | 12
32 | (France) Pauline Ranvier | 15
17 | (Germany) Carolin Golubytskyi | 15
48 | (Germany) Leonie Ebert | 6
49 | (United States) Sabrina Massialas | 8
16 | (United States) Nicole Ross | 7
9 | (Russia) Larisa Korobeynikova | 15
56 | (Hong Kong) Po Heung Lin | 8
41 | (Hong Kong) Kimberley Vanessa Cheung | 10
24 | (Poland) Martyna Synoradzka | 15
25 | (Hungary) Aida Mohamed | 10
40 | (Hungary) Gabriella Varga | 15
57 | (Japan) Haruka Yanaoka | 5
8 | (Italy) Martina Batini | 15

Round of 32
1 | (Italy) Arianna Errigo | 15
32 | (France) Pauline Ranvier | 10
17 | (Germany) Carolin Golubytskyi | 9
49 | (United States) Sabrina Massialas | 15
9 | (Russia) Larisa Korobeynikova | 15
24 | (Poland) Martyna Synoradzka | 6
40 | (Hungary) Gabriella Varga | 10
8 | (Italy) Martina Batini | 15

Round of 16
1 | (Italy) Arianna Errigo | 15
49 | (United States) Sabrina Massialas | 4
9 | (Russia) Larisa Korobeynikova | 15
8 | (Italy) Martina Batini | 9

Quarterfinals
1 | (Italy) Arianna Errigo | 15
9 | (Russia) Larisa Korobeynikova | 10

==== Section 2 ====
Round of 64
5 | (Russia) Inna Deriglazova | 15
60 | (Argentina) Flavia Mormandi | 6
37 | (Canada) Eleanor Harvey | 14
28 | (Poland) Magdalena Knop | 15
21 | (Poland) Hanna Łyczbińska | 7
44 | (United Kingdom) Natalia Sheppard | 6
53 | (China) Huo Xingxin | 5
12 | (Russia) Yuliya Biryukova | 15
13 | (China) Le Huilin | 15
52 | (Ukraine) Alexandra Senyuta | 8
45 | (Mexico) Alely Hernandez | 15
20 | (Canada) Alanna Goldie | 13
29 | (South Korea) Lim Seung-min | 15
36 | (Slovakia) Kitti Bitterova | 12
61 | (Turkey) Irem Karamete | 6
4 | (United States) Lee Kiefer | 15

Round of 32
5 | (Russia) Inna Deriglazova | 15
28 | (Poland) Magdalena Knop | 12
21 | (Poland) Hanna Łyczbińska | 13
12 | (Russia) Yuliya Biryukova | 12
13 | (China) Le Huilin | 15
45 | (Mexico) Alely Hernandez | 3
29 | (South Korea) Lim Seung-min | 11
4 | (United States) Lee Kiefer | 15

Round of 16
5 | (Russia) Inna Deriglazova | 15
21 | (Poland) Hanna Łyczbińska | 11
13 | (China) Le Huilin | 7
4 | (United States) Lee Kiefer | 15

Quarterfinals
5 | (Russia) Inna Deriglazova | 15
4 | (United States) Lee Kiefer | 12

=== Bottom half ===
==== Section 3 ====
Round of 64
3 | (Tunisia) Inès Boubakri | 15
62 | (China) Gong Yu | 5
35 | (Germany) Anne Sauer | 11
30 | (Canada) Shannon Comerford | 15
19 | (Russia) Aida Shanayeva
46 | (Germany) Sandra Bingenheimer
51 | (Chile) Paula Silva | 9
14 | (South Korea) Kim Mi-na | 15
11 | (France) Astrid Guyart | 15
54 | (Canada) Kelleigh Ryan | 4
42 | (Mexico) Melissa Rebolledo | 8
22 | (Hungary) Edina Knapek | 15
27 | (South Korea) Nam Hyun-hee | 15
38 | (Ukraine) Kateryna Chentsova | 6
59 | (Spain) Maria Marino | 4
6 | (Italy) Valentina Vezzali | 15

Round of 32
3 | (Tunisia) Inès Boubakri | 15
30 | (Canada) Shannon Comerford | 9
19 | (Russia) Aida Shanayeva | 15
14 | (South Korea) Kim Mi-na | 9
11 | (France) Astrid Guyart | 9
22 | (Hungary) Edina Knapek | 10
27 | (South Korea) Nam Hyun-hee | 1
6 | (Italy) Valentina Vezzali | 2

Round of 16
3 | (Tunisia) Inès Boubakri | 13
19 | (Russia) Aida Shanayeva | 15
22 | (Hungary) Edina Knapek | 13
6 | (Italy) Valentina Vezzali | 7

Quarterfinals
19 | (Russia) Aida Shanayeva | 15
22 | (Hungary) Edina Knapek | 12

==== Section 4 ====
Round of 64
7 | (South Korea) Jeon Hee-sook | 13
58 | (Mexico) Nataly Michel | 11
39 | (Singapore) Wang Wenying | 6
26 | (France) Anita Blaze | 15
23 | (Austria) Olivia Wohlgemuth | 15
42 | (Australia) Alicia Ji Yeon Kwag | 3
55 | (Brazil) Gabriela Cecchini | 7
10 | (France) Ysaora Thibus | 15
15 | (United States) Nzingha Prescod | 15
50 | (Ukraine) Anastasiya Moskovska | 8
47 | (Colombia) Saskia Loretta van Erven Garcia | 15
18 | (Lebanon) Mona Shaito | 4
31 | (Japan) Hiromi Kusano | 15
34 | (Ukraine) Olha Leleiko | 5
63 | (Venezuela) Isis Gimenez | 9
2 | (Italy) Elisa Di Francisca | 14

Round of 32
7 | (South Korea) Jeon Hee-sook | 14
26 | (France) Anita Blaze | 13
23 | (Austria) Olivia Wohlgemuth | 6
10 | (France) Ysaora Thibus | 15
15 | (United States) Nzingha Prescod | 15
47 | (Colombia) Saskia Loretta van Erven Garcia | 9
31 | (Japan) Hiromi Kusano | 5
2 | (Italy) Elisa Di Francisca | 15

Round of 16
7 | (South Korea) Jeon Hee-sook | 12
10 | (France) Ysaora Thibus | 15
15 | (United States) Nzingha Prescod | 15
2 | (Italy) Elisa Di Francisca | 14

Quarterfinals
10 | (France) Ysaora Thibus | 14
15 | (United States) Nzingha Prescod | 15
