= Fencing at the 2011 Pan American Games – Women's foil =

Women's foil at the 2011 Pan American Games
- Venue: Multipurpose Gymnasium
- Dates: October 24
- Competitors: 18 from 10 nations

Medalists
Gold medal	Lee Kiefer	United States
Silver medal	Nzingha Prescod	United States
Bronze medal	Monica Peterson	Canada
Bronze medal	Nataly Michel	Mexico

The women's foil competition of the fencing events at the 2011 Pan American Games in Guadalajara, Mexico, was held on October 24 at the Multipurpose Gymnasium. The defending champion was Mariana González from Venezuela.

The foil competition consisted of a qualification round followed by a single-elimination bracket with a bronze medal match between the two semifinal losers. Fencing was done to 15 touches or the completion of three three-minute rounds if neither fencer reached 15 touches by then. At the end of time, the higher-scoring fencer was the winner; a tie resulted in an additional one-minute sudden-death period. This sudden-death period was further modified by the selection of a draw-winner beforehand; if neither fencer scored a touch during the minute, the predetermined draw-winner won the bout.

== Schedule ==
All times are Central Standard Time (UTC−6).

Date	Time	Round
October 24, 2011	11:50	Qualification pools
October 24, 2011	14:30	Round of 16
October 24, 2011	15:45	Quarterfinals
October 24, 2011	19:35	Semifinals
October 24, 2011	20:30	Final

== Results ==
=== Qualification ===
All 18 fencers were put into three groups of six athletes, where each fencer would have five individual matches. The top 16 athletes overall would qualify for next round.

Rank	Name	Nation	Victories	TG	TR	Dif.	Notes
1	Mariana González	Venezuela	5	25	7	+18	Q
2	Lee Kiefer	United States	5	25	10	+15	Q
3	Misleydys Compañi	Cuba	4	24	14	+10	Q
4	Monica Peterson	Canada	4	20	14	+6	Q
5	Alanna Goldie	Canada	4	20	15	+5	Q
6	Ana Bulcao	Brazil	3	21	13	+8	Q
7	Yuleidy Terry	Cuba	3	17	12	+5	Q
8	Nzingha Prescod	United States	3	17	14	+3	Q
9	Paula Silva	Chile	3	18	16	+2	Q
10	Alely Hernandez	Mexico	3	16	17	-1	Q
11	Nataly Michel	Mexico	2	17	19	-2	Q
12	Carmen Nuñez	Dominican Republic	1	17	21	-4	Q
13	Kristal Bas	Puerto Rico	1	13	22	-9	Q
14	Johana Fuenmayor	Venezuela	1	11	20	-9	Q
15	Barbara Garcia	Chile	1	14	24	-10	Q
16	Amanda Simeão	Brazil	1	10	20	-10	Q
17	Luisa Parrilla	Puerto Rico	1	12	23	-11	
18	Ivania Carballo	El Salvador	0	9	25	-16	

=== Elimination round ===
Round of 16
1	Mariana González (VEN)	15
16	Amanda Simeão (BRA)	3
9	Paula Silva (CHI)	10
8	Nzingha Prescod (USA)	15
5	Alanna Goldie (CAN)	15
12	Carmen Nuñez (DOM)	7
13	Kristal Bas (PUR)	6
4	Monica Peterson (CAN)	15
3	Misleydys Compañi (CUB)	4
14	Johana Fuenmayor (VEN)	15
11	Nataly Michel (MEX)	15
6	Ana Bulcao (BRA)	12
7	Yuleidy Terry (CUB)	13
10	Alely Hernandez (MEX)	15
15	Barbara Garcia (CHI)	9
2	Lee Kiefer (USA)	15

Quarterfinals
1	Mariana González (VEN)	13
8	Nzingha Prescod (USA)	15
5	Alanna Goldie (CAN)	12
4	Monica Peterson (CAN)	15
14	Johana Fuenmayor (VEN)	7
11	Nataly Michel (MEX)	15
10	Alely Hernandez (MEX)	7
2	Lee Kiefer (USA)	15

Semifinals
8	Nzingha Prescod (USA)	15
4	Monica Peterson (CAN)	6
11	Nataly Michel (MEX)	7
2	Lee Kiefer (USA)	15

Final
8	Nzingha Prescod (USA)	9
2	Lee Kiefer (USA)	15
