= Fencing at the 2011 Pan American Games – Women's team foil =

Women's team foil at the 2011 Pan American Games
- Venue: Multipurpose Gymnasium
- Dates: October 27
- Competitors: 27 from 7 nations

Medalists
Gold medal	Lee Kiefer; Nzingha Prescod; Doris Willette; Ibtihaj Muhammad	United States
Silver medal	Alanna Goldie; Monica Peterson; Kelleigh Ryan; Sandra Sassine	Canada
Bronze medal	Mariana Gonzalez; Johanna Fuenmayor; Yulitza Suarez; Maria Martinez	Venezuela

The women's team foil competition of the fencing events at the 2011 Pan American Games in Guadalajara, Mexico, was held on October 27 at the Multipurpose Gymnasium. The defending champion was the team from Venezuela.

The team foil competition consisted of a three-round single-elimination bracket with a bronze medal match between the two semifinal losers and classification semifinals and finals for 5th to 8th places. Teams consist of three members each. Matches consist of nine bouts, with every fencer on one team facing each fencer on the other team. Scoring carried over between bouts with a total of 45 touches being the team goal. Bouts lasted until one team reached the target multiple of 5 touches. For example, if the first bout ended with a score of 5-3, that score would remain into the next bout and the second bout would last until one team reached 10 touches. Bouts also had a maximum time of three minutes each; if the final bout ended before either team reached 45 touches, the team leading at that point won. A tie at that point would result in an additional one-minute sudden-death time period. This sudden-death period was further modified by the selection of a draw-winner beforehand; if neither fencer scored a touch during the minute, the predetermined draw-winner won the bout.

== Schedule ==
All times are Central Standard Time (UTC-6).

Date	Time	Round
October 27, 2011	13:20	Quarterfinals
October 27, 2011	14:50	Fifth to eighth
October 27, 2011	15:00	Semifinals
October 27, 2011	16:30	Fifth place
October 27, 2011	16:30	Bronze medal match
October 27, 2011	20:40	Final

== Draw ==
=== Finals ===
Quarterfinals
1	United States
Bye
5	Chile	45
4	Puerto Rico	43
6	Mexico	31
3	Venezuela	45
7	Cuba	33
2	Canada	45

Semifinals
1	United States	45
5	Chile	21
3	Venezuela	31
2	Canada	45

Final
1	United States	42
2	Canada	25
Third place
5	Chile	23
3	Venezuela	45

=== Classification 5 – 8 ===
Classification
Bye
4	Puerto Rico
6	Mexico	29
7	Cuba	45

Fifth place
4	Puerto Rico	22
7	Cuba	45
Seventh place
Bye
6	Mexico

== Final classification ==
Rank	Team	Athlete
1st place, gold medalist(s)	United States	Lee Kiefer; Nzingha Prescod; Doris Willette; Ibtihaj Muhammad
2nd place, silver medalist(s)	Canada	Alanna Goldie; Monica Peterson; Kelleigh Ryan; Sandra Sassine
3rd place, bronze medalist(s)	Venezuela	Mariana Gonzalez; Johanna Fuenmayor; Yulitza Suarez; Maria Martinez
4	Chile	Barbara Garcia; Alejandra Muñoz; Paula Silva; Pía Montecinos
5	Cuba	Misleydys Compañi; Adriagne Rivot; Yuleidy Terry; Yamirka Rordriguez
6	Puerto Rico	Kristal Bas; Karla Melendez; Luisa Parrilla
7	Mexico	Aidee Hernandez; Alely Hernandez; Nataly Michel; Andrea Millan
