= Fencing at the 2019 Pan American Games – Women's foil =

Women's foil at the 2019 Pan American Games
- Venue: Lima Convention Centre
- Dates: August 5
- Competitors: 18 from 10 nations

Medalists
Gold medal	Lee Kiefer	United States
Silver medal	Jessica Guo	Canada
Bronze medal	Bia Bulcão	Brazil
Bronze medal	Eleanor Harvey	Canada

The women's foil competition of the fencing events at the 2019 Pan American Games was held on August 5 at the Lima Convention Centre.

The foil competition consisted of a qualification round followed by a single-elimination bracket with a bronze medal match between the two semifinal losers. Fencing was done to 15 touches or to the completion of three three-minute rounds if neither fencer reached 15 touches by then. At the end of time, the higher-scoring fencer was the winner; a tie resulted in an additional one-minute sudden-death time period. This sudden-death period was further modified by the selection of a draw-winner beforehand; if neither fencer scored a touch during the minute, the predetermined draw-winner won the bout.

== Schedule ==
Date	Time	Round
August 5, 2019	11:30	Qualification pools
August 5, 2019	13:50	Round of 16
August 5, 2019	15:30	Quarterfinals
August 5, 2019	16:30	Semifinals
August 5, 2019	18:45	Final

== Results ==
The following are the results of the event.

=== Qualification ===
All 18 fencers were put into three groups of six athletes, were each fencer would have five individual matches. The top 14 athletes overall would qualify for next round.

Rank	Name	Nation	Victories	TG	TR	Dif.	Notes
1	Lee Kiefer	United States	5	25	3	+22	Q
2	Eleanor Harvey	Canada	5	22	5	+17	Q
3	Jessica Guo	Canada	5	25	13	+12	Q
4	Nataly Michel	Mexico	4	21	12	+9	Q
5	Paola Gil	Peru	3	21	17	+4	Q
6	Jacqueline Dubrovich	United States	3	18	15	+3	Q
6	Daylen Moreno	Cuba	3	18	15	+3	Q
8	Flavia Mormandi	Argentina	3	17	14	+3	Q
9	Saskia Loretta van Erven Garcia	Colombia	3	19	17	+2	Q
10	Anabella Acurero	Venezuela	2	16	18	-2	Q
11	Gabriela Cecchini	Brazil	2	15	18	-3	Q
12	Bia Bulcão	Brazil	2	16	20	-4	Q
13	Lucia Ondarts	Argentina	2	15	22	-7	Q
14	Denisse Hernández	Mexico	1	15	21	-6	Q
15	Elizabeth Hidalgo	Cuba	1	14	22	-9	
16	Kusi Rosales	Peru	1	9	21	-12	
17	Ivania Carballo	El Salvador	0	12	25	-13	
18	Tatiana Prieto	Colombia	0	6	25	-19	

=== Elimination round ===
Round of 16
9	Saskia Loretta van Erven Garcia (COL)	6
8	Flavia Mormandi (ARG)	15
5	Paola Gil (PER)	13
12	Bia Bulcão (BRA)	15
13	Lucia Ondarts (ARG)	12
4	Nataly Michel (MEX)	15
3	Jessica Guo (CAN)	15
14	Denisse Hernández (MEX)	5
11	Gabriela Cecchini (BRA)	15
6	Jacqueline Dubrovich (USA)	13
7	Daylen Moreno (CUB)	7
10	Anabella Acurero (VEN)	15

Quarterfinals
1	Lee Kiefer (USA)	15
8	Flavia Mormandi (ARG)	9
12	Bia Bulcão (BRA)	15
4	Nataly Michel (MEX)	13
3	Jessica Guo (CAN)	15
11	Gabriela Cecchini (BRA)	6
10	Anabella Acurero (VEN)	5
2	Eleanor Harvey (CAN)	15

Semifinals
1	Lee Kiefer (USA)	15
12	Bia Bulcão (BRA)	3
3	Jessica Guo (CAN)	14
2	Eleanor Harvey (CAN)	12

Final
1	Lee Kiefer (USA)	15
3	Jessica Guo (CAN)	10
