= Fencing at the 2015 Pan American Games – Women's foil =

Women's foil at the 2015 Pan American Games
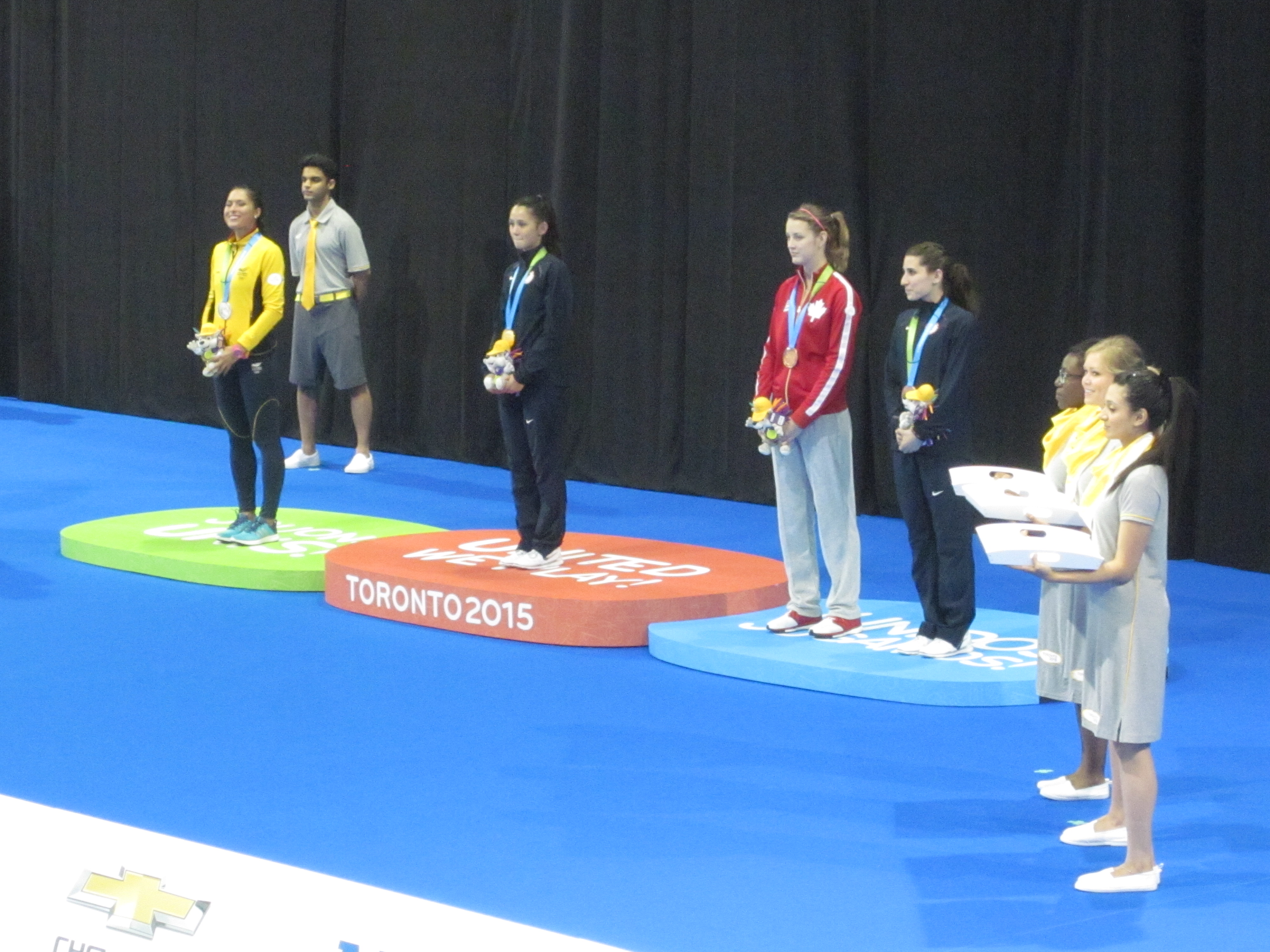
- 2015 Pan American Games Fencing Women's individual foil medalists
- Venue: Toronto Pan Am Sports Centre
- Dates: July 22
- Competitors: 18 from 10 nations

Medalists
Gold medal	Lee Kiefer	United States
Silver medal	Saskia Loretta van Erven Garcia	Colombia
Bronze medal	Nicole Ross	United States
Bronze medal	Alanna Goldie	Canada

The women's foil competition of the fencing events at the 2015 Pan American Games was held on July 22 at the Toronto Pan Am Sports Centre.

The foil competition consisted of a qualification round followed by a single-elimination bracket with a bronze medal match between the two semifinal losers. Fencing was done to 15 touches or to the completion of three three-minute rounds if neither fencer reached 15 touches by then. At the end of time, the higher-scoring fencer was the winner; a tie resulted in an additional one-minute sudden-death time period. This sudden-death period was further modified by the selection of a draw-winner beforehand; if neither fencer scored a touch during the minute, the predetermined draw-winner won the bout.

== Schedule ==
All times are Eastern Daylight Time (UTC-4).

Date	Time	Round
July 22, 2015	9:05	Qualification pools
July 22, 2015	10:50	Round of 16
July 22, 2015	12:00	Quarterfinals
July 22, 2015	18:00	Semifinals
July 22, 2015	19:20	Final

== Results ==
The following are the results of the event.

=== Qualification ===
All 18 fencers were put into three groups of six athletes, were each fencer would have five individual matches. The top 16 athletes overall would qualify for next round.

Rank	Name	Nation	Victories	TG	TR	Dif.	Notes
1	Lee Kiefer	United States	5	25	9	+16	Q
2	Alanna Goldie	Canada	5	25	14	+11	Q
3	Saskia Loretta van Erven Garcia	Colombia	4	23	13	+10	Q
4	Kelleigh Ryan	Canada	4	22	12	+10	Q
5	Nicole Ross	United States	4	21	15	+6	Q
6	Isis Giménez	Venezuela	3	22	16	+6	Q
7	Elizabeth Hidalgo	Cuba	3	19	14	+5	Q
8	Gabriela Cecchini	Brazil	3	20	18	+2	Q
9	Flavia Mormandi	Argentina	3	18	16	+2	Q
10	Daylen Moreno	Cuba	3	18	20	-2	Q
11	Paula Silva	Chile	2	20	17	+3	Q
12	Denisse Hernández	Mexico	2	17	19	-2	Q
13	Ana Beatriz Bulcão	Brazil	1	15	21	-6	Q
14	Nataly Michel	Mexico	1	12	22	-10	Q
15	María Luisa Doig	Peru	1	11	22	-11	Q
15	Liz Rivero	Venezuela	1	11	22	-11	Q
17	Alejandra Muñoz	Chile	0	11	25	-14	
18	Alejandra Carbone	Argentina	0	9	24	-15	

=== Elimination round ===
Round of 16
1	Lee Kiefer (USA)	15
16	Liz Rivero (VEN)	5
9	Flavia Mormandi (ARG)	5
8	Gabriela Cecchini (BRA)	15
5	Nicole Ross (USA)	13
12	Denisse Hernández (MEX)	10
13	Ana Beatriz Bulcão (BRA)	4
4	Kelleigh Ryan (CAN)	15
3	Saskia Loretta van Erven Garcia (COL)	15
14	Nataly Michel (MEX)	9
11	Paula Silva (CHI)	10
6	Isis Giménez (VEN)	15
7	Elizabeth Hidalgo (CUB)	15
10	Daylen Moreno (CUB)	14
15	María Luisa Doig (PER)	2
2	Alanna Goldie (CAN)	15

Quarterfinals
1	Lee Kiefer (USA)	15
8	Gabriela Cecchini (BRA)	9
5	Nicole Ross (USA)	11
4	Kelleigh Ryan (CAN)	10
3	Saskia Loretta van Erven Garcia (COL)	15
6	Isis Giménez (VEN)	3
7	Elizabeth Hidalgo (CUB)	2
2	Alanna Goldie (CAN)	15

Semifinals
1	Lee Kiefer (USA)	15
5	Nicole Ross (USA)	5
3	Saskia Loretta van Erven Garcia (COL)	15
2	Alanna Goldie (CAN)	3

Final
1	Lee Kiefer (USA)	15
3	Saskia Loretta van Erven Garcia (COL)	11
