= Fencing at the 2023 Pan American Games – Women's foil =

Women's foil at the 2023 Pan American Games
- Venue: Paralympic Training Center
- Dates: October 30
- Competitors: 18 from 10 nations

Medalists
Gold medal	Lee Kiefer	United States
Silver medal	Eleanor Harvey	Canada
Bronze medal	Jessica Guo	Canada
Bronze medal	Mariana Pistoia	Brazil

The women's foil competition of the fencing events at the 2023 Pan American Games was held on October 30 at the Paralympic Training Center.

The foil competition consisted of a qualification round followed by a single-elimination bracket with a bronze medal match between the two semifinal losers. Fencing was done to 15 touches or to the completion of three three-minute rounds if neither fencer reached 15 touches by then. At the end of time, the higher-scoring fencer was the winner; a tie resulted in an additional one-minute sudden-death time period. This sudden-death period was further modified by the selection of a draw-winner beforehand; if neither fencer scored a touch during the minute, the predetermined draw-winner won the bout.

== Schedule ==
Date	Time	Round
October 30, 2023	10:40	Qualification pools
October 30, 2023	13:15	Round of 16
October 30, 2023	14:50	Quarterfinals
October 30, 2023	16:30	Semifinals
October 30, 2023	18:45	Final

== Results ==
The following are the results of the event.

=== Qualification ===
All 18 fencers were put into three groups of six athletes, were each fencer would have five individual matches. The top 14 athletes overall would qualify for next round.

Rank	Name	Nation	Victories	TG	TR	Dif.	Notes
1	Eleanor Harvey	Canada	5	24	4	+20	Q
2	Lee Kiefer	United States	5	25	8	+17	Q
3	Jacqueline Dubrovich	United States	5	25	16	+9	Q
4	Arantza Inostroza	Chile	4	21	13	+8	Q
5	Mariana Pistoia	Brazil	4	20	12	+8	Q
6	Jessica Guo	Canada	4	22	18	+4	Q
7	Nataly Michel	Mexico	3	23	16	+7	Q
8	Denisse Hernández	Mexico	3	16	15	+1	Q
9	Kusi Rosales	Peru	3	17	17	0	Q
10	Katina Proestakis	Chile	2	18	17	+1	Q
11	Gabriela Del Carmen Padua	Puerto Rico	1	17	23	-6	Q
12	Tatiana Prieto	Colombia	1	14	23	-9	Q
13	Bia Bulcão	Brazil	1	14	23	-9	Q
14	Athina González Ciavarella	Argentina	1	13	22	-9	Q
15	Paola Gil Piñero	Chile	1	12	21	-9	Q
16	Lucia Ondarts	Argentina	1	12	22	-10	Q
17	Juliana Pineda Valencia	Colombia	1	10	21	-11	
18	Camila Ortiz	Ecuador	0	13	25	-12	

=== Elimination round ===
Round of 16
1	Eleanor Harvey (CAN)	15
16	Lucia Ondarts (ARG)	7
9	Kusi Rosales (PER)	11
8	Denisse Hernández (MEX)	12
5	Mariana Pistoia (BRA)	15
12	Tatiana Prieto (COL)	11
13	Bia Bulcão (BRA)	11
4	Arantza Inostroza (CHI)	15
3	Jacqueline Dubrovich (USA)	15
14	Athina González Ciavarella (ARG)	9
11	Gabriela Del Carmen Padua (PUR)	5
6	Jessica Guo (CAN)	15
7	Nataly Michel (MEX)	15
10	Katina Proestakis (CHI)	9
15	Paola Gil Piñero (CHI)	6
2	Lee Kiefer (USA)	15

Quarterfinals
1	Eleanor Harvey (CAN)	11
8	Denisse Hernández (MEX)	6
5	Mariana Pistoia (BRA)	15
4	Arantza Inostroza (CHI)	11
3	Jacqueline Dubrovich (USA)	8
6	Jessica Guo (CAN)	15
7	Nataly Michel (MEX)	8
2	Lee Kiefer (USA)	15

Semifinals
1	Eleanor Harvey (CAN)	14
5	Mariana Pistoia (BRA)	4
6	Jessica Guo (CAN)	8
2	Lee Kiefer (USA)	15

Final
1	Eleanor Harvey (CAN)	6
2	Lee Kiefer (USA)	15
