= Anna Bentley =

British fencer (born 1981)

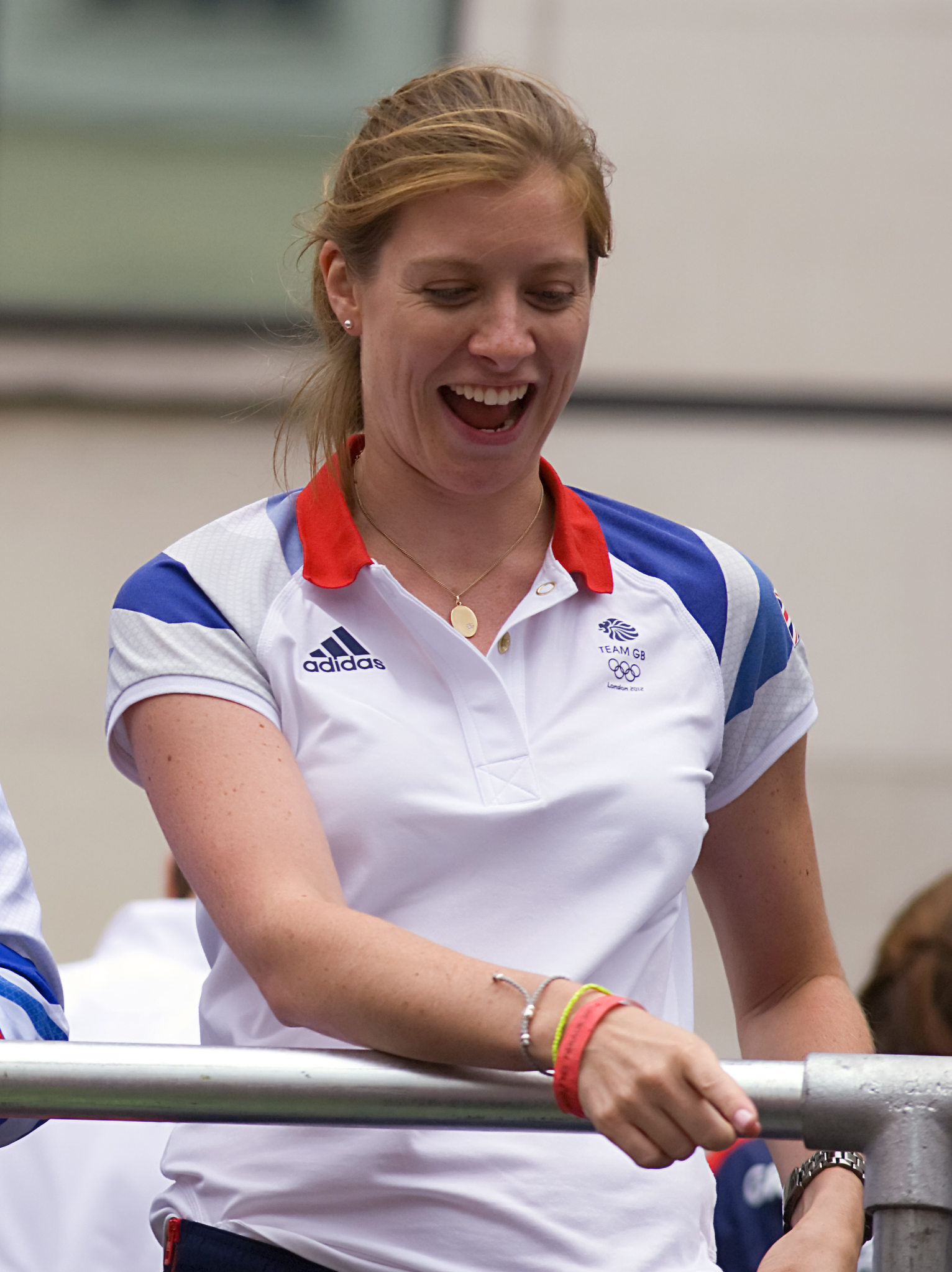
- Bentley at the Our Greatest Team Parade

Personal information
- Born: 28 January 1981 (age 45) Aberdeen, Scotland
- Home town: London, England
- Height: 1.83 m (6 ft 0 in)
- Weight: 73 kg (161 lb)

Fencing career
- Sport: Fencing
- Country: Great Britain
- Weapon: Foil
- Hand: Left-handed
- Club: Salle Boston
- Head coach: Tomek Walicki
- FIE ranking: current ranking

Anna Bentley (born 28 January 1981) is a British foil fencer. She represented Great Britain at the 2012 Summer Olympics.

== Career ==
Bentley was born in Aberdeen, Scotland, but grew up in Bergh Apton, Norfolk. She took up fencing at the age of eleven after coach Andrew Sowerby from the Norfolk Academy of Fencing did a "come and try" session at the Norwich High School for Girls. She attended The British School in the Netherlands, leaving in 1999.

She qualified to the 2012 Summer Olympics through host country option. In the individual event she was defeated 9–10 in the first round by Canada's Monica Peterson. With Sophie Troiano and Natalia Sheppard represented Great Britain in the team event. They defeated Egypt in the first round, but lost to title favourites Italy, composed of the gold, silver, and bronze medallists of the individual event.

Bentley won the gold medal at the individual British National Championships in 2008, 2009 and 2010. She won the silver medal at the 2006 Commonwealth Fencing Championships. She represented Great Britain at 5 consecutive World Championships from 2007 to 2011.

Bentley is the eldest granddaughter Chris Anderson.
