= Men's team épée at the 2012 World Fencing Championships =

The Men's team épée event of the 2012 World Fencing Championships was contested in Kyiv.

== Medalists ==
1st place, gold medalist(s)	United States; Soren Thompson; Weston Kelsey; Cody Mattern; Benjamin Bratton
2nd place, silver medalist(s)	France; Gauthier Grumier; Yannick Borel; Jean-Michel Lucenay; Ulrich Robeiri
3rd place, bronze medalist(s)	Hungary; Géza Imre; Gábor Boczkó; Péter Somfai; András Rédli

== Draw ==
=== Finals ===
Semifinals
France	28
Italy	27
United States	10
Hungary	10

Final
France	37
United States	44
Third place
Italy	37
Hungary	45

=== Top half ===
Round of 32
France
Bye
Kyrgyzstan	45
Czech Republic	36
Canada
Bye
Bye
Russia
China
Bye
Israel	39
Poland	45
Norway	45
Belarus	34
Bye
Italy

Round of 16
France	45
Kyrgyzstan	41
Canada	29
Russia	45
China	24
Poland	32
Norway	28
Italy	45

Quarterfinals
France	45
Russia	36
Poland	26
Italy	45

Semifinals
France	28
Italy	27

=== Bottom half ===
Round of 32
United States
Bye
Hong Kong	39
Kazakhstan	45
Ukraine	39
Netherlands	45
Bye
Switzerland
Germany
Bye
Bye
Venezuela
Estonia	45
Iran	22
Bye
Hungary

Round of 16
United States	45
Kazakhstan	24
Netherlands	41
Switzerland	45
Germany	31
Venezuela	45
Estonia	39
Hungary	45

Quarterfinals
United States	25
Switzerland	24
Venezuela	26
Hungary	33

Semifinals
United States	10
Hungary	10

=== Placement matches ===
==== 5–8th place ====
5–8th place semifinals
Russia	37
Poland	23
Switzerland	34
Venezuela	28

Fifth place
Russia	32
Switzerland	45
Seventh place
Poland	41
Venezuela	45

==== 9–12th place ====
9–16th place quarterfinals
Kyrgyzstan	42
Canada	45
China	36
Norway	45
Kazakhstan	39
Netherlands	45
Germany	39
Estonia	39

9–12th place semifinals
Canada	27
Norway	45
Netherlands	45
Estonia	36

Ninth place
Norway	45
Netherlands	39
11th place
Canada	39
Estonia	45

==== 13–16th place ====
13–16th place semifinals
Kyrgyzstan	45
China	37
Kazakhstan	35
Germany	45

13th place
Kyrgyzstan	45
Germany	37
15th place
China	45
Kazakhstan	36

== Final classification ==
Rank	Team
1st place, gold medalist(s)	United States
2nd place, silver medalist(s)	France
3rd place, bronze medalist(s)	Hungary
4	Italy
5	Switzerland
6	Russia
7	Venezuela
8	Poland
9	Norway
10	Netherlands
11	Estonia
12	Canada
13	Kyrgyzstan
14	Germany
15	China
16	Kazakhstan
17	Ukraine
18	Czech Republic
19	Iran
20	Hong Kong
21	Belarus
22	Israel
