= Fencing at the 2012 Summer Olympics – Women's team foil =

Women's team foil at the Games of the XXX Olympiad
- Venue: ExCeL Exhibition Centre
- Date: 2 August
- Competitors: 36 from 9 nations

Medalists
1st place, gold medalist(s)		Valentina Vezzali; Elisa Di Francisca; Arianna Errigo; Ilaria Salvatori	Italy
2nd place, silver medalist(s)		Aida Chanaeva; Larisa Korobeynikova; Inna Deriglazova; Kamila Gafurzyanova	Russia
3rd place, bronze medalist(s)		Nam Hyun-Hee; Jeon Hee-Sook; Jung Gil-Ok; Oh Ha-Na	South Korea

The women's team foil competition in fencing at the 2012 Olympic Games in London was held on 2 August at the ExCeL Exhibition Centre.

== Competition format ==
Nine teams competed in the women's team foil event. The draw was made considering the FIE rankings.

== Schedule ==
All times are British Summer Time (UTC+1)

Date	Time	Round
Thursday, 2 August 2012	09:00	Qualifications and finals

== Draw ==
=== Finals ===
Round of 16
9	Egypt	34
8	Great Britain	45

Quarter-finals
1	Italy	42
8	Great Britain	14
5	Poland	31
4	France	42
3	South Korea	45
6	United States	31
7	Japan	17
2	Russia	45

Semi-finals
1	Italy	45
4	France	22
3	South Korea	32
2	Russia	44

Finals
1	Italy	45
2	Russia	31
Third place
4	France	32
3	South Korea	45

=== Classification 5–8 ===
Placement 5-8
8	Great Britain	20
5	Poland	43
6	United States	44
7	Japan	22

Placement 5-6
5	Poland	45
6	United States	39
Placement 7-8
8	Great Britain	21
7	Japan	30

== Final classification ==
Rank	Team	Athlete
1st place, gold medalist(s)	Italy	Elisa Di Francisca; Arianna Errigo; Valentina Vezzali; Ilaria Salvatori
2nd place, silver medalist(s)	Russia	Inna Deriglazova; Kamilla Gafurzianova; Aida Shanayeva; Larisa Korobeynikova
3rd place, bronze medalist(s)	South Korea	Jeon Hee-Sook; Jung Gil-Ok; Nam Hyun-Hee; Oh Ha-Na
4	France	Astrid Guyart; Corinne Maîtrejean; Ysaora Thibus; Anita Blaze
5	Poland	Sylwia Gruchała; Martyna Synoradzka; Małgorzata Wojtkowiak; Karolina Chlewińska
6	United States	Lee Kiefer; Nzingha Prescod; Nicole Ross; Doris Willette
7	Japan	Kanae Ikehata; Shiho Nishioka; Chieko Sugawara; Kyomi Hirata
8	Great Britain	Anna Bentley; Natalia Sheppard; Sophie Troiano; Martina Emanuel
9	Egypt	Eman El Gammal; Shaimaa El-Gammal; Eman Gaber; Rana El Husseiny
