= Fencing at the 2012 Summer Olympics – Women's foil =

Women's foil at the Games of the XXX Olympiad
- Venue: ExCeL Exhibition Centre
- Date: 28 July
- Competitors: 38 from 20 nations

Medalists
| 1st place, gold medalist(s) | | Elisa Di Francisca | Italy |
| 2nd place, silver medalist(s) | | Arianna Errigo | Italy |
| 3rd place, bronze medalist(s) | | Valentina Vezzali | Italy |

The women's foil competition in fencing at the 2012 Olympic Games in London was held on 28 July at the ExCeL Exhibition Centre.

The medalists were all from Italy. Elisa Di Francisca won the gold medal, beating Arianna Errigo in the final, while Valentina Vezzali took bronze.

== Schedule ==
All times are British Summer Time (UTC+1)

| Date | Time | Round |
|---|---|---|
| Saturday, 28 July 2012 | 09:00 | Qualifications and finals |

== Results ==
=== Finals ===
Semi-finals
Nam Hyun-Hee (KOR) | 10
Elisa Di Francisca (ITA) | 11
Arianna Errigo (ITA) | 15
Valentina Vezzali (ITA) | 12

Final
Elisa Di Francisca (ITA) | 12
Arianna Errigo (ITA) | 11
Bronze medal match
Nam Hyun-Hee (KOR) | 12
Valentina Vezzali (ITA) | 13

=== Top half ===
==== Section 1 ====
Round of 64
Anissa Khelfaoui (ALG) | 4
Olga Leleyko (UKR) | 15

Round of 32
Nam Hyun-Hee (KOR) | 15
Olga Leleyko (UKR) | 9
Nzingha Prescod (USA) | 10
Aida Mohamed (HUN) | 15
Inna Deriglazova (RUS) | 8
Ysaora Thibus (FRA) | 15
Kanae Ikehata (JPN) | 9
Sylwia Gruchała (POL) | 8

Round of 16
Nam Hyun-Hee (KOR) | 8
Aida Mohamed (HUN) | 7
Ysaora Thibus (FRA) | 11
Kanae Ikehata (JPN) | 15

Quarter-finals
Nam Hyun-Hee (KOR) | 15
Kanae Ikehata (JPN) | 6

==== Section 2 ====
Round of 64
Sophie Troiano (GBR) | 9
Natalia Sheppard (GBR) | 12
Shaimaa El-Gammal (EGY) | 6
Mona Shaito (LIB) | 7

Round of 32
Corinne Maîtrejean (FRA) | 15
Natalia Sheppard (GBR) | 5
Chieko Sugawara (JPN) | 15
Jeon Hee-Sook (KOR) | 13
Carolin Golubytskyi (GER) | 14
Saskia Loretta van Erven Garcia (COL) | 9
Mona Shaito (LIB) | 2
Elisa Di Francisca (ITA) | 15

Round of 16
Corinne Maîtrejean (FRA) | 9
Chieko Sugawara (JPN) | 15
Carolin Golubytskyi (GER) | 9
Elisa Di Francisca (ITA) | 15

Quarter-finals
Chieko Sugawara (JPN) | 9
Elisa Di Francisca (ITA) | 15

=== Bottom half ===
==== Section 3 ====
Round of 64
Johana Fuenmayor (VEN) | 15
Eman El Gammal (EGY) | 9
Monica Peterson (CAN) | 10
Anna Bentley (GBR) | 9

Round of 32
Arianna Errigo (ITA) | 15
Johana Fuenmayor (VEN) | 4
Martyna Synoradzka (POL) | 8
Kamilla Gafurzianova (RUS) | 15
Aida Shanaeva (RUS) | 14
Jung Gil-Ok (KOR) | 15
Monica Peterson (CAN) | 10
Lee Kiefer (USA) | 15

Round of 16
Arianna Errigo (ITA) | 15
Kamilla Gafurzianova (RUS) | 7
Jung Gil-Ok (KOR) | 13
Lee Kiefer (USA) | 15

Quarter-finals
Arianna Errigo (ITA) | 15
Lee Kiefer (USA) | 10

==== Section 4 ====
Round of 64
Lin Po Heung (HKG) | 10
Shiho Nishioka (JPN) | 13

Round of 32
Astrid Guyart (FRA) | 15
Eman Gaber (EGY) | 2
Nicole Ross (USA) | 8
Ines Boubakri (TUN) | 15
Chen Jinyan (CHN) | 15
Malgorzata Wojtkowiak (POL) | 8
Shiho Nishioka (JPN) | 8
Valentina Vezzali (ITA) | 14

Round of 16
Astrid Guyart (FRA) | 10
Ines Boubakri (TUN) | 15
Chen Jinyan (CHN) | 6
Valentina Vezzali (ITA) | 15

Quarter-finals
Ines Boubakri (TUN) | 7
Valentina Vezzali (ITA) | 8

== Results ==
| Rank | Fencer | Country |
|---|---|---|
| 1st place, gold medalist(s) | Elisa Di Francisca | Italy |
| 2nd place, silver medalist(s) | Arianna Errigo | Italy |
| 3rd place, bronze medalist(s) | Valentina Vezzali | Italy |
| 4 | Nam Hyeon-Hui | South Korea |
| 5 | Lee Kiefer | United States |
| 6 | Ines Boubakri | Tunisia |
| 7 | Chieko Sugawara | Japan |
| 8 | Kanae Ikehata | Japan |
| 9 | Corinne Maîtrejean | France |
| 10 | Astrid Guyart | France |
| 11 | Kamilla Gafurzianova | Russia |
| 12 | Carolin Golubytskyi | Germany |
| 13 | Aida Mohamed | Hungary |
| 14 | Chen Jinyan | China |
| 15 | Jung Gil-Ok | South Korea |
| 16 | Ysaora Thibus | France |
| 17 | Sylwia Gruchała | Poland |
| 18 | Inna Deriglazova | Russia |
| 19 | Aida Shanayeva | Russia |
| 20 | Jeon Hee-Sook | South Korea |
| 21 | Małgorzata Wojtkowiak | Poland |
| 22 | Nzingha Prescod | United States |
| 23 | Martyna Synoradzka | Poland |
| 24 | Saskia Loretta van Erven Garcia | Colombia |
| 25 | Nicole Ross | United States |
| 26 | Iman Shaban | Egypt |
| 27 | Natalia Sheppard | Great Britain |
| 28 | Monica Peterson | Canada |
| 29 | Olha Leleiko | Ukraine |
| 30 | Shiho Nishioka | Japan |
| 31 | Johana Fuenmayor | Venezuela |
| 32 | Mona Shaito | Lebanon |
| 33 | Shaimaa El-Gammal | Egypt |
| 34 | Eman El Gammal | Egypt |
| 35 | Lin Po Heung | Hong Kong |
| 36 | Anissa Khelfaoui | Algeria |
| 37 | Sophie Troiano | Great Britain |
| 38 | Anna Bentley | Great Britain |
