= Fencing at the 2015 Pan American Games – Women's team foil =

Women's team foil at the 2015 Pan American Games
- Venue: Toronto Pan Am Sports Centre
- Dates: July 25
- Competitors: 24 from 8 nations

Medalists
Gold medal	Alanna Goldie; Eleanor Harvey; Kelleigh Ryan	Canada
Silver medal	Lee Kiefer; Nzingha Prescod; Nicole Ross	United States
Bronze medal	Denisse Hernández; Nataly Michel; Melissa Rebolledo	Mexico

The women's team foil competition of the fencing events at the 2015 Pan American Games was held on July 25 at the Toronto Pan Am Sports Centre.

The team foil competition consisted of a three-round single-elimination bracket with a bronze medal match between the two semifinal losers and classification semifinals and finals for 5th to 8th places. Teams consist of three members each. Matches consist of nine bouts, with every fencer on one team facing each fencer on the other team. Scoring carried over between bouts with a total of 45 touches being the team goal. Bouts lasted until one team reached the target multiple of 5 touches. For example, if the first bout ended with a score of 5-3, that score would remain into the next bout and the second bout would last until one team reached 10 touches. Bouts also had a maximum time of three minutes each; if the final bout ended before either team reached 45 touches, the team leading at that point won. A tie at that point would result in an additional one-minute sudden-death time period. This sudden-death period was further modified by the selection of a draw-winner beforehand; if neither fencer scored a touch during the minute, the predetermined draw-winner won the bout.

== Schedule ==
All times are Eastern Daylight Time (UTC-4).

Date	Time	Round
July 25, 2015	8:35	Quarterfinals
July 25, 2015	9:50	Fifth to eighth
July 25, 2015	11:05	Semifinals
July 25, 2015	17:05	Bronze medal match
July 25, 2015	19:05	Final

== Results ==
The following are the results of the event.

Quarterfinals
1	United States	45
8	Cuba	19
5	Chile	19
4	Brazil	45
3	Mexico	45
6	Venezuela	33
7	Argentina	24
2	Canada	45

Semifinals
1	United States	45
4	Brazil	26
3	Mexico	24
2	Canada	43

Final
1	United States	37
2	Canada	38
Third place
4	Brazil	42
3	Mexico	43

=== Classification 5 – 8 ===
Classification
8	Cuba	44
5	Chile	35
6	Venezuela	45
7	Argentina	40

Fifth place
8	Cuba	39
6	Venezuela	40
Seventh place
5	Chile	38
7	Argentina	45

== Final classification ==
Rank	Team	Athlete
1st place, gold medalist(s)	Canada	Alanna Goldie; Eleanor Harvey; Kelleigh Ryan
2nd place, silver medalist(s)	United States	Lee Kiefer; Nzingha Prescod; Nicole Ross
3rd place, bronze medalist(s)	Mexico	Denisse Hernández; Nataly Michel; Melissa Rebolledo
4	Brazil	Ana Beatriz Bulcão; Gabriela Cecchini; Taís Rochel
5	Venezuela	Isis Giménez; Emiliana Rivero; Liz Rivero
6	Cuba	Elizabeth Hidalgo; Daylen Moreno; Elisa Tamayo
7	Argentina	Alejandra Carbone; Flavia Mormandi; Maria Terni
8	Chile	Alejandra Flores; Alejandra Muñoz; Paula Silva
