= Fencing at the 2016 Summer Olympics – Women's foil =

Women's foil at the Games of the XXXI Olympiad
- Venue: Carioca Arena 3
- Date: 10 August 2016
- Competitors: 35 from 27 nations

Medalists
1st place, gold medalist(s)		Inna Deriglazova	Russia
2nd place, silver medalist(s)		Elisa Di Francisca	Italy
3rd place, bronze medalist(s)		Inès Boubakri	Tunisia

The women's foil competition in fencing at the 2016 Summer Olympics in Rio de Janeiro was held on 10 August at the Carioca Arena 3.

== Results ==
=== Finals ===
Semi-finals
Inès Boubakri (TUN)	9
Elisa Di Francisca (ITA)	12
Aida Shanayeva (RUS)	3
Inna Deriglazova (RUS)	15

Final
Elisa Di Francisca (ITA)	11
Inna Deriglazova (RUS)	12
Bronze medal match
Inès Boubakri (TUN)	15
Aida Shanayeva (RUS)	11

=== Top half ===
==== Section 1 ====
Round of 64
Đỗ Thị Anh (VIE)	15
Aikaterini Kontochristopoulou (GRE)	13

Round of 32
Arianna Errigo (ITA)	15
Đỗ Thị Anh (VIE)	9
Anissa Khelfaoui (ALG)	6
Eleanor Harvey (CAN)	15
Nam Hyun-hee (KOR)	12
Shiho Nishioka (JPN)	15
Noura Mohamed (EGY)	4
Inès Boubakri (TUN)	15

Round of 16
Arianna Errigo (ITA)	11
Eleanor Harvey (CAN)	15
Shiho Nishioka (JPN)	10
Inès Boubakri (TUN)	15

Quarter-finals
Eleanor Harvey (CAN)	13
Inès Boubakri (TUN)	15

==== Section 2 ====
Round of 64

Round of 32
Elisa Di Francisca (ITA)	15
Lin Po Heung (HKG)	8
Hanna Łyczbińska (POL)	14
Carolin Golubytskyi (GER)	9
Edina Knapek (HUN)	9
Liu Yongshi (CHN)	15
Mona Shaito (LIB)	3
Lee Kiefer (USA)	15

Round of 16
Elisa Di Francisca (ITA)	15
Hanna Łyczbińska (POL)	6
Liu Yongshi (CHN)	15
Lee Kiefer (USA)	9

Quarter-finals
Elisa Di Francisca (ITA)	15
Liu Yongshi (CHN)	10

=== Bottom half ===
==== Section 3 ====
Round of 64
Lubna Al-Omair (KSA)	0
Taís Rochel (BRA)	15

Round of 32
Aida Shanayeva (RUS)	15
Taís Rochel (BRA)	13
Isis Giménez (VEN)	8
Jeon Hee-sook (KOR)	10
Le Huilin (CHN)	15
Youssra Zekrani (MAR)	4
İrem Karamete (TUR)	6
Ysaora Thibus (FRA)	15

Round of 16
Aida Shanayeva (RUS)	15
Jeon Hee-sook (KOR)	11
Le Huilin (CHN)	13
Ysaora Thibus (FRA)	15

Quarter-finals
Aida Shanayeva (RUS)	15
Ysaora Thibus (FRA)	13

==== Section 4 ====
Round of 64
Bia Bulcão (BRA)	15
Mălina Călugăreanu (ROU)	12

Round of 32
Nzingha Prescod (USA)	15
Nataly Michel (MEX)	9
Olha Leleiko (UKR)	9
Astrid Guyart (FRA)	15
Aida Mohamed (HUN)	15
Saskia van Erven (COL)	12
Bia Bulcão (BRA)	6
Inna Deriglazova (RUS)	15

Round of 16
Nzingha Prescod (USA)	11
Astrid Guyart (FRA)	14
Aida Mohamed (HUN)	6
Inna Deriglazova (RUS)	15

Quarter-finals
Astrid Guyart (FRA)	6
Inna Deriglazova (RUS)	15

== Final classification ==
Rank	Fencer	Country
1st place, gold medalist(s)	Inna Deriglazova	Russia
2nd place, silver medalist(s)	Elisa Di Francisca	Italy
3rd place, bronze medalist(s)	Ines Boubakri	Tunisia
4	Aida Shanaeva	Russia
5	Ysaora Thibus	France
6	Astrid Guyart	France
7	Eleanor Harvey	Canada
8	Liu Yongshi	China
9	Arianna Errigo	Italy
10	Lee Kiefer	United States
11	Nzingha Prescod	United States
12	Le Huilin	China
13	Jeon Hee-sook	South Korea
14	Aida Mohamed	Hungary
15	Hanna Łyczbińska	Poland
16	Shiho Nishioka	Japan
17	Nam Hyun-hee	South Korea
18	Carolin Golubytskyi	Germany
19	Edina Knapek	Hungary
20	Anissa Khelfaoui	Algeria
21	Saskia van Erven	Colombia
22	Isis Gimenez	Venezuela
23	Youssra Zekrani	Morocco
24	Olha Leleiko	Ukraine
25	Noura Mohamed	Egypt
26	Nataly Michel	Mexico
27	Irem Karamete	Turkey
28	Lin Po Heung	Hong Kong
29	Mona Shaito	Lebanon
30	Tais Rochel	Brazil
31	Ana Beatriz Bulcao	Brazil
32	Đỗ Thị Anh	Vietnam
33	Aikaterini Kontochristopoulou	Greece
34	Mălina Călugăreanu	Romania
35	Lubna Al-Omair	Saudi Arabia
