= Fencing at the 2023 Pan American Games – Women's team foil =

Women's team foil at the 2023 Pan American Games
- Venue: Paralympic Training Center
- Dates: November 2
- Competitors: 24 from 8 nations

Medalists
Gold medal	Jacqueline Dubrovich; Lee Kiefer; Zander Rhodes	United States
Silver medal	Jessica Guo; Sabrina Fang; Eleanor Harvey	Canada
Bronze medal	Nataly Michel; Denisse Hernandez; Melissa Rebolledo	Mexico

The women's team foil competition of the fencing events at the 2023 Pan American Games was held on November 2 at the Paralympic Training Center.

== Format ==
The team foil competition consisted of a three-round single-elimination bracket with a bronze medal match between the two semifinal losers and classification semifinals and finals for 5th to 8th places. Teams consist of three members each. Matches consist of nine bouts, with every fencer on one team facing each fencer on the other team. Scoring carried over between bouts with a total of 45 touches being the team goal. Bouts lasted until one team reached the target multiple of 5 touches. For example, if the first bout ended with a score of 5–3, that score would remain into the next bout and the second bout would last until one team reached 10 touches. Bouts also had a maximum time of three minutes each; if the final bout ended before either team reached 45 touches, the team leading at that point won. A tie at that point would result in an additional one-minute sudden-death time period. This sudden-death period was further modified by the selection of a draw-winner beforehand; if neither fencer scored a touch during the minute, the predetermined draw-winner won the bout.

== Schedule ==
Date	Time	Round
November 2, 2023	10:40	Quarterfinals
November 2, 2023	12:40	Semifinals
November 2, 2023	12:40	Fifth - Eight Place
November 2, 2023	13:40	Seventh - Eight Place
November 2, 2023	13:40	Fifth - Sixth Place
November 2, 2023	16:00	Finals

== Results ==
The results were as follows:

Quarterfinals
United States	45
Peru	15
Brazil	44
Chile	37
Mexico	4
Argentina	33
Colombia	25
Canada	45

Semifinals
United States	45
Brazil	15
Mexico	26
Canada	45

Final
United States	44
Canada	33
Third place
Brazil	40
Mexico	45

=== Classification 5 – 8 ===
Classification
Chile	45
Peru	27
Colombia	31
Argentina	45

Fifth place
Chile	45
Argentina	38
Seventh place
Peru	45
Colombia	29

== Final classification ==
Rank	Team	Athlete
1st place, gold medalist(s)	United States	Jacqueline Dubrovich; Lee Kiefer; Zander Rhodes
2nd place, silver medalist(s)	Canada	Jessica Guo; Sabrina Fang; Eleanor Harvey
3rd place, bronze medalist(s)	Mexico	Nataly Michel; Denisse Hernandez; Melissa Rebolledo
4	Brazil	Mariana Pistoia; Ana Beatriz Bulcão; Carolina Brecheret
5	Chile	Lisa Montecinos; Katina Proestakis; Arantza Inostroza
6	Argentina	Flavia Mormandi; Lucía Ondarts; Athina Gonzalez
7	Peru	Kusi Rosales; Paola Gil; Mariana Soriano
8	Colombia	Juliana Pineda; María José Figueredo; Tatiana Prieto
