= Fencing at the 2015 Pan American Games – Men's team épée =

Men's team épée at the 2015 Pan American Games
- Venue: Toronto Pan Am Sports Centre
- Dates: July 24
- Competitors: 24 from 8 nations

Medalists
| Gold medal | Silvio Fernández; Francisco Limardo; Rubén Limardo | Venezuela |
| Silver medal | Benjamin Bratton; Jason Pryor; Yeisser Ramirez | United States |
| Bronze medal | Reynier Henrique; Ringo Quintero; Yunior Reytor | Cuba |

The men's team épée competition of the fencing events at the 2015 Pan American Games was held on July 24 at the Toronto Pan Am Sports Centre.

The team épée competition consisted of a three-round single-elimination bracket with a bronze medal match between the two semifinal losers and classification semifinals and finals for 5th to 8th places. Teams consist of three members each. Matches consist of nine bouts, with every fencer on one team facing each fencer on the other team. Scoring carried over between bouts with a total of 45 touches being the team goal. Bouts lasted until one team reached the target multiple of 5 touches. For example, if the first bout ended with a score of 5-3, that score would remain into the next bout and the second bout would last until one team reached 10 touches. Bouts also had a maximum time of three minutes each; if the final bout ended before either team reached 45 touches, the team leading at that point won. A tie at that point would result in an additional one-minute sudden-death time period. This sudden-death period was further modified by the selection of a draw-winner beforehand; if neither fencer scored a touch during the minute, the predetermined draw-winner won the bout.

== Schedule ==
All times are Eastern Daylight Time (UTC-4).

| Date | Time | Round |
|---|---|---|
| July 24, 2015 | 12:10 | Quarterfinals |
| July 24, 2015 | 13:25 | Fifth to eighth |
| July 24, 2015 | 14:40 | Semifinals |
| July 24, 2015 | 18:05 | Bronze medal match |
| July 24, 2015 | 20:05 | Final |

== Results ==
The following are the results of the event.

Quarterfinals
1 | United States | 45
8 | Mexico | 33
5 | Colombia | 45
4 | Argentina | 31
3 | Canada | 37
6 | Cuba | 45
7 | Brazil | 28
2 | Venezuela | 45

Semifinals
1 | United States | 45
5 | Colombia | 42
6 | Cuba | 2
2 | Venezuela | 3

Final
1 | United States | 40
2 | Venezuela | 45
Third place
5 | Colombia | 39
6 | Cuba | 43

=== Classification 5 – 8 ===
Classification
8 | Mexico | 45
4 | Argentina | 33
3 | Canada | 44
7 | Brazil | 41

Fifth place
8 | Mexico | 27
3 | Canada | 45
Seventh place
4 | Argentina | 36
7 | Brazil | 45

== Final classification ==
| Rank | Team | Athlete |
|---|---|---|
| 1st place, gold medalist(s) | Venezuela | Silvio Fernández; Francisco Limardo; Rubén Limardo |
| 2nd place, silver medalist(s) | United States | Benjamin Bratton; Jason Pryor; Yeisser Ramirez |
| 3rd place, bronze medalist(s) | Cuba | Reynier Henrique; Ringo Quintero; Yunior Reytor |
| 4 | Colombia | Andrés Felipe Campos Zarate; Gustavo Coqueco; Jhon Rodriguez |
| 5 | Canada | Hugues Boisvert-Simard; Maxime Brinck-Croteau; Jean Lelion |
| 6 | Mexico | Omar Carrillo; Ryan Rodriguez; Erick Trujillo |
| 7 | Brazil | Alexandre Camargo; Nicolas Ferreira; Athos Schwantes |
| 8 | Argentina | José Dominguez; Jesús Lugonés; Alessandro Taccani |
