= Fencing at the 2026 South American Games =

Fencing competitions at the 2026 South American Games

- Venue: Estadio Salvador Bonilla
- Dates: September 13–18
- Competitors: 151 from 11 nations

Fencing competitions at the 2026 South American Games in Rosario, Santa Fe, and Rafaela, Argentina, were held between September 13 and 18 at Estadio Salvador Bonilla, located within Parque de la Independencia in Rosario.

A total of 12 events were contested (six men's and six women's).

== Medal summary ==
=== Medal table ===
* Host nation (Argentina)

Rank	Nation	Gold	Silver	Bronze	Total
1	Argentina*	5	2	4	11
2	Venezuela	3	2	5	10
3	Brazil	2	5	1	8
4	Chile	2	1	3	6
5	Peru	0	2	2	4
6	Colombia	0	0	2	2
7	Paraguay	0	0	1	1
Totals (7 entries)		12	12	18	42

=== Medalists ===
==== Men ====
Event	Gold	Silver	Bronze
Individual épée	Grabiel Lugo; Venezuela	Nicolas Deguchi; Brazil	Jesús Limardo; Venezuela
Individual épée	Grabiel Lugo; Venezuela	Nicolas Deguchi; Brazil	Hernando Roa; Colombia
Team épée	Brazil; Alexandre Camargo; Nicolas Deguchi; Pedro Marostega; Richard Grunhauser	Venezuela; Francisco Limardo; Grabiel Lugo; Jesús Limardo; Guiseppe Astorino	Argentina; Iván Groupierre; Alec Brooke; Jesús Lugones; Agustín Gusmán
Individual foil	Augusto Servello; Argentina	Andrea Nigosanti; Argentina	Alessio Fukuda; Peru
Individual foil	Augusto Servello; Argentina	Andrea Nigosanti; Argentina	Leopoldo Alarcón; Chile
Team foil	Chile; Leopoldo Alarcón; David Alarcón; Gustavo Alarcón; Vicente Otayza	Brazil; Dominic de Almeida; Guilherme Toldo; Paulo Morais; Pedro Marostega	Peru; Alessio Fukuda; Joaquín Espinoza; Isaac Ariza
Individual sabre	Pascual Di Tella; Argentina	Eliécer Romero; Venezuela	Juan Bacha; Argentina
Individual sabre	Pascual Di Tella; Argentina	Eliécer Romero; Venezuela	José Quintero; Venezuela
Team sabre	Argentina; Juan Bacha; Tomás Altisz; Santino Perez; Pascual Di Tella	Brazil; Bruno Pekelman; Henrique Garrigós; Pedro Marostega; Renato Saliba	Venezuela; Eliécer Romero; José Quintero; Marcel Medina; Simon Duran

==== Women ====
Event	Gold	Silver	Bronze
Individual épée	Isabel Di Tella; Argentina	María Luisa Doig; Peru	Gabriela Viveros; Paraguay
Individual épée	Isabel Di Tella; Argentina	María Luisa Doig; Peru	Carmen Correa; Colombia
Team épée	Venezuela; Lizze Asis; Eliana Lugo; Betyumil Posada; Clarismar Farías	Chile; Analía Fernández; Marianne Frindt; Arantza Inostroza; Paula Vásquez	Argentina; Josefina Mendez; Margarita Musci; Victoria Eglez; Isabel Di Tella
Individual foil	Bia Bulcão; Brazil	Mariana Soriano; Peru	Arantza Inostroza; Chile
Individual foil	Bia Bulcão; Brazil	Mariana Soriano; Peru	Katina Proestakis; Chile
Team foil	Chile; Arantza Inostroza; Lisa Montecinos; Katina Proestakis; Rafaela Santibáñez	Brazil; Bia Bulcão; Ana Toldo; Gabriella Vianna; Mariana Pistoia	Venezuela; Isis Giménez; Anabella Acurero; Hillary Avelleira; Barbara Manrique
Individual sabre	Katherine Paredes; Venezuela	Maria Perroni; Argentina	Luana Pekelman; Brazil
Individual sabre	Katherine Paredes; Venezuela	Maria Perroni; Argentina	Candela Espinosa; Argentina
Team sabre	Argentina; Candela Espinosa; Catalina Borrelli; María Perroni; María Fencer	Brazil; Ana Toldo; Karina Trois; Luana Pekelman; Pietra Chierighini	Venezuela; Andrea Moros; Yesimar Aponte; Katherine Paredes; Ariana Prieto

== Participation ==
Eleven nations participated in fencing events of the 2026 South American Games.

- Argentina (24)
- Bolivia (11)
- Brazil (24)
- Chile (20)
- Colombia (18)
- Ecuador (1)
- Panama (5)
- Paraguay (8)
- Peru (11)
- Uruguay (5)
- Venezuela (24)

== Results ==
=== Men's individual epée ===
Round of 32
(Bolivia) Daniel Gálvez	6
(Chile) Jorge Valderrama	15

Round of 16
(Venezuela) Jesús Limardo	14
(Chile) Jorge Valderrama	12
(Peru) Marcos García	7
(Colombia) Juan Castillo	15
(Venezuela) Grabiel Lugo	15
(Chile) Pablo Nuñez	13
(Panama) Arturo Dorati	8
(Argentina) Jesús Lugones	15
(Brazil) Nicolas Deguchi	15
(Argentina) Alec Brooke	11
(Paraguay) Víctor Leguizamon	10
(Paraguay) Emmanuel Bernal	15
(Brazil) Alexandre Camargo	15
(Panama) Isaac Dorati	10
(Peru) Cristóbal Indacochea	9
(Colombia) Hernando Roa	15

Quarterfinals
(Venezuela) Jesús Limardo	15
(Colombia) Juan Castillo	9
(Venezuela) Grabiel Lugo	15
(Argentina) Jesús Lugones	13
(Brazil) Nicolas Deguchi	15
(Paraguay) Emmanuel Bernal	11
(Brazil) Alexandre Camargo	14
(Colombia) Hernando Roa	15

Semifinals
(Venezuela) Jesús Limardo	7
(Venezuela) Grabiel Lugo	8
(Brazil) Nicolas Deguchi	15
(Colombia) Hernando Roa	14

Finals
(Venezuela) Grabiel Lugo	15
(Brazil) Nicolas Deguchi	13

=== Men's individual foil ===
Round of 16
(Venezuela) César Aguirre	15
(Chile) Vicente Otayza	6
(Bolivia) Mateo Granda	4
(Argentina) Andrea Nigosanti	15
(Colombia) Isaac Camayo	15
(Ecuador) Tomás Aguinaga	13
(Argentina) Augusto Servello	15
(Colombia) Alejandro Bolaños	9
(Brazil) Pedro Marostega	5
(Brazil) Guilherme Toldo	15
(Peru) Isaac Ariza	13
(Peru) Alessio Fukuda	15
(Bolivia) Andrés Montaño	4
(Venezuela) José Briceño	15

Quarterfinals
(Chile) Leopoldo Alarcón	15
(Venezuela) César Aguirre	5
(Argentina) Andrea Nigosanti	15
(Colombia) Isaac Camayo	6
(Argentina) Augusto Servello	15
(Brazil) Guilherme Toldo	14
(Peru) Alessio Fukuda	15
(Venezuela) José Briceño	8

Semifinals
(Chile) Leopoldo Alarcón	8
(Argentina) Andrea Nigosanti	15
(Argentina) Augusto Servello	15
(Peru) Alessio Fukuda	12

Final
(Argentina) Andrea Nigosanti	10
(Argentina) Augusto Servello	15

=== Men's individual sabre ===
Round of 16
(Brazil) Renato Saliba	15
(Chile) Ricardo Álvarez	7
(Colombia) Juan Pacheco	14
(Uruguay) Guillermo Maclean	15
(Paraguay) Gonzalo Ruiz	7
(Venezuela) José Quintero	15
(Colombia) Jacob Cardona	10
(Chile) Manuel Bahamonde	15
(Brazil) Bruno Pekelman	15
(Peru) Leonardo Nuñez	14

Quarterfinals
(Venezuela) Eliecer Romero	15
(Brazil) Renato Saliba	8
(Uruguay) Guillermo Maclean	8
(Venezuela) José Quintero	15
(Argentina) Juan Bacha	15
(Chile) Manuel Bahamonde	12
(Brazil) Bruno Pekelman	5
(Argentina) Pascual Di Tella	15

Semifinals
(Venezuela) Eliecer Romero	15
(Venezuela) José Quintero	10
(Argentina) Juan Bacha	12
(Argentina) Pascual Di Tella	15

Final
(Venezuela) Eliecer Romero	12
(Argentina) Pascual Di Tella	15

=== Men's team epée ===
Quarterfinals
Venezuela	45
Paraguay	21
Chile	38
Panama	45
Colombia	27
Argentina	45
Peru	18
Brazil	45

Semifinals
Venezuela	45
Panama	38
Argentina	29
Brazil	42

Final
Venezuela	42
Brazil	45
Bronze medal match
Panama	36
Argentina	45

=== Men's team foil ===
Quarterfinals
Peru	45
Colombia	33
Venezuela	45
Argentina	32
Bolivia	24
Chile	45

Semifinals
Brazil	45
Peru	28
Venezuela	42
Chile	42

Final
Brazil	30
Chile	45
Bronze medal match
Peru	45
Venezuela	41

=== Men's team sabre ===
Quarterfinals
Colombia	40
Argentina	45

Semifinals
Venezuela	43
Argentina	45
Brazil	45
Chile	40

Final
Argentina	45
Brazil	29
Bronze medal match
Venezuela	45
Chile	32

=== Women's individual epée ===
Round of 32
(Bolivia) Mariana Cuellar	13
(Bolivia) Briana Sandoval	15
(Panama) Alessandra Aicardi	1
(Uruguay) Ariana Cedrez	4

Round of 16
(Paraguay) Gabriela Viveros	15
(Bolivia) Briana Sandoval	2
(Argentina) Josefina Mendez	13
(Brazil) Laura Correia	15
(Argentina) Isabel Di Tella	15
(Venezuela) Lizze Asis	10
(Chile) Analía Fernández	15
(Colombia) María Jaramillo	9
(Paraguay) Janine Hanspach	10
(Colombia) Carmen Correa	15
(Uruguay) Martina Paz	5
(Brazil) Maria Chaves	15
(Peru) María Luisa Doig	15
(Chile) Paula Vásquez	5
(Panama) Alessandra Aicardi	15
(Venezuela) Clarismar Farías	11

Quarterfinals
(Paraguay) Gabriela Viveros	15
(Brazil) Laura Correia	6
(Argentina) Isabel Di Tella	15
(Chile) Analía Fernández	12
(Colombia) Carmen Correa	13
(Brazil) Maria Chaves	12
(Peru) María Luisa Doig	11
(Panama) Alessandra Aicardi	10

Semifinals
(Paraguay) Gabriela Viveros	14
(Argentina) Isabel Di Tella	15
(Colombia) Carmen Correa	7
(Peru) María Luisa Doig	13

Finals
(Argentina) Isabel Di Tella	15
(Peru) María Luisa Doig	12

=== Women's individual foil ===
Round of 16
(Argentina) Valentina Cassanello	15
(Colombia) Tatiana Prieto	13
(Venezuela) Anabella Acurero	15
(Peru) Astrid Bravo	4
(Uruguay) María Papuchi	2
(Chile) Katina Proestakis	15
(Venezuela) Isis Giménez	15
(Bolivia) Erika Christie	2
(Colombia) Laura Guerra	7
(Peru) Mariana Soriano	15
(Chile) Arantza Inostroza	15
(Argentina) Daniela Espinoza	6

Quarterfinals
(Brazil) Bia Bulcão	15
(Argentina) Valentina Cassanello	2
(Chile) Katina Proestakis	15
(Venezuela) Anabella Acurero	8
(Venezuela) Isis Giménez	13
(Peru) Mariana Soriano	15
(Chile) Arantza Inostroza	15
(Brazil) Mariana Pistoia	14

Semifinals
(Brazil) Bia Bulcão	15
(Chile) Katina Proestakis	8
(Peru) Mariana Soriano	15
(Chile) Arantza Inostroza	14

Final
(Brazil) Bia Bulcão	15
(Peru) Mariana Soriano	9

=== Women's individual sabre ===
Round of 16
(Paraguay) Amara Martínez	15
(Chile) Florencia Cabezas	11
(Venezuela) Andrea Moros	15
(Bolivia) Briana Iriarte	13
(Colombia) Valentina Beltrán	6
(Brazil) Luana Pekelman	15
(Bolivia) Flavia Quiroga	13
(Colombia) María Blanco	15
(Argentina) Candela Espinosa	15
(Chile) Yolanda Muñoz	11

Quarterfinals
(Venezuela) Katherine Paredes	15
(Paraguay) Amara Martínez	2
(Venezuela) Andrea Moros	12
(Brazil) Luana Pekelman	15
(Argentina) María Perroni	15
(Colombia) María Blanco	8
(Argentina) Candela Espinosa	15
(Brazil) Karina Trois	9

Semifinals
(Venezuela) Katherine Paredes	15
(Brazil) Luana Pekelman	11
(Argentina) María Perroni	15
(Argentina) Candela Espinosa	13

Final
(Venezuela) Katherine Paredes	15
(Argentina) María Perroni	11

=== Women's team epée ===
Quarterfinals
Argentina	45
Brazil	37
Colombia	45
Paraguay	44
Uruguay	20
Chile	45

Semifinals
Venezuela	45
Argentina	41
Colombia	33
Chile	42

Final
Venezuela	45
Chile	32
Bronze medal match
Argentina	45
Colombia	32

=== Women's team foil ===
Quarterfinals
Argentina	42
Colombia	37
Brazil	45
Peru	16

Semifinals
Chile	42
Argentina	32
Brazil	45
Venezuela	27

Final
Chile	45
Brazil	33
Bronze medal match
Argentina	41
Venezuela	43

=== Women's team sabre ===
Quarterfinals
Brazil	45
Colombia	41
Chile	45
Bolivia	42

Semifinals
Venezuela	27
Brazil	45
Chile	27
Argentina	45

Final
Brazil	37
Argentina	45
Bronze medal match
Venezuela	45
Chile	38
