= Kanae Ikehata =

Japanese fencer

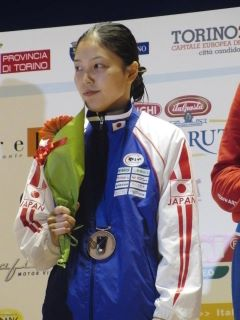

Personal information
- Nationality: Japan
- Born: 10 December 1982
- Height: 5 ft 4 in (162 cm)
- Weight: 126 lb (57 kg)

Sport
- Sport: Fencing
- Club: Kyoto Fencing Club
Medal record
Women's fencing
Representing Japan
Asian Games
Silver medal – second place	2010 Guangzhou	Team Foil
Summer Universiade
Bronze medal – third place	2005 İzmir	Individual Foil

Kanae Ikehata (池端 花奈恵, Kanae Ikehata) is a Japanese female Foil fencer. She competed at the 2012 Summer Olympics in the individual event and the team event. In the individual event she was eliminated in the quarterfinals by Nam Hyun-Hee. In the team event the Japanese team was eliminated in the second round by Russia.
