= Youssra Zekrani =

Moroccan fencer

Personal information
- Born: 7 January 1995 (age 31)

Sport
- Sport: Fencing

Youssra Zekrani (born 7 January 1995) is a Moroccan fencer. She competed in the women's foil event at the 2016 Summer Olympics.
