= 2012 World Fencing Championships =

International fencing competition

2012 World Championships in Fencing
- Dates: 13–14 April
- Host city: Kyiv, Ukraine
- Events: 2

The 2012 World Fencing Championships was held in Kyiv, Ukraine from 13–14 April. The only events were the women's team sabre and men's épée team, as these events are not included in the program of the 2012 London Olympics.

== Results ==
=== Men ===
Event	Gold	Silver	Bronze
Épée
Team Épée (14 April)	United States; Soren Thompson; Weston Kelsey; Cody Mattern; Benjamin Bratton	France; Gauthier Grumier; Yannick Borel; Jean-Michel Lucenay; Ulrich Robeiri	Hungary; Géza Imre; Gábor Boczkó; Péter Somfai; András Rédli

=== Women ===
Event	Gold	Silver	Bronze
Sabre
Team Sabre (13 April)	Russia; Sofiya Velikaya; Yuliya Gavrilova; Ekaterina Dyachenko; Dina Galiakbarova	Ukraine; Olha Kharlan; Olha Zhovnir; Olena Khomrova; Halyna Pundyk	United States; Mariel Zagunis; Dagmara Wozniak; Daria Schneider; Ibtihaj Muhammad

== Medal table ==
#	Nation	Gold medal	Silver medal	Bronze medal	Total
1	United States	1	0	1	2
2	Russia	1	0	0	1
3	France	0	1	0	1
3	Ukraine	0	1	0	1
5	Hungary	0	0	1	1
Total		2	2	2	6
