= Jessica Guo =

Canadian fencer (born 2005)

Personal information
- Born: June 23, 2005 (age 21) Toronto, Ontario, Canada
- Height: 1.64 m (5 ft 5 in)

Fencing career
- Sport: Fencing
- Country: Canada
- Weapon: Foil
- Hand: Left-handed
- Club: Jinko Fencing Club
- Head coach: Jin Ko
Medal record
Women's fencing
Representing Canada
Junior World Championships
| Bronze medal – third place | 2025 Wuxi | Individual foil |
Pan American Games
| Silver medal – second place | 2019 Lima | Foil |
| Silver medal – second place | 2019 Lima | Team foil |
| Silver medal – second place | 2023 Santiago | Team foil |
| Bronze medal – third place | 2023 Santiago | Individual foil |
Pan American Fencing Championships
| Gold medal – first place | 2022 Asuncion | Team foil |
| Silver medal – second place | 2024 Lima | Team foil |
| Silver medal – second place | 2026 Lima | Team foil |
| Bronze medal – third place | 2022 Asuncion | Foil |
| Bronze medal – third place | 2024 Lima | Foil |
Junior World Fencing Championships
| Gold medal – first place | 2021 Cairo | Foil |
| Bronze medal – third place | 2021 Cairo | Foil |

Jessica Zi Jia Guo (born 23 June 2005) is a Canadian left-handed foil fencer.

== Career ==
In 2019, Guo won the silver medal in the women's foil event at the Pan American Games held in Lima, Peru. In the final, she lost against American Lee Kiefer.

Guo represented Canada at the 2020 Summer Olympics in Tokyo, Japan. She competed in the women's foil and women's team foil events. She advanced to the Table of 16 in individual foil, and helped Canada to a fifth-place finish in team foil.

In 2021, Guo won the Cadet Women's Foil World Championship in Cairo, Egypt.

On 6 April 2022, Guo successfully defended her Cadet Women's Foil World Championship title in Dubai. In the final match of women's foil, Guo faced Great Britain's Carolina Stutchbury, winning with a 15–7 score. In the semifinal round, Stutchbury won against Japan's Rino Nagase, 15–10, while Guo defeated Italy's Matilde Molinari, 15–11.

== See also ==
- List of NCAA fencing champions
