= Jason Pryor =

American fencer

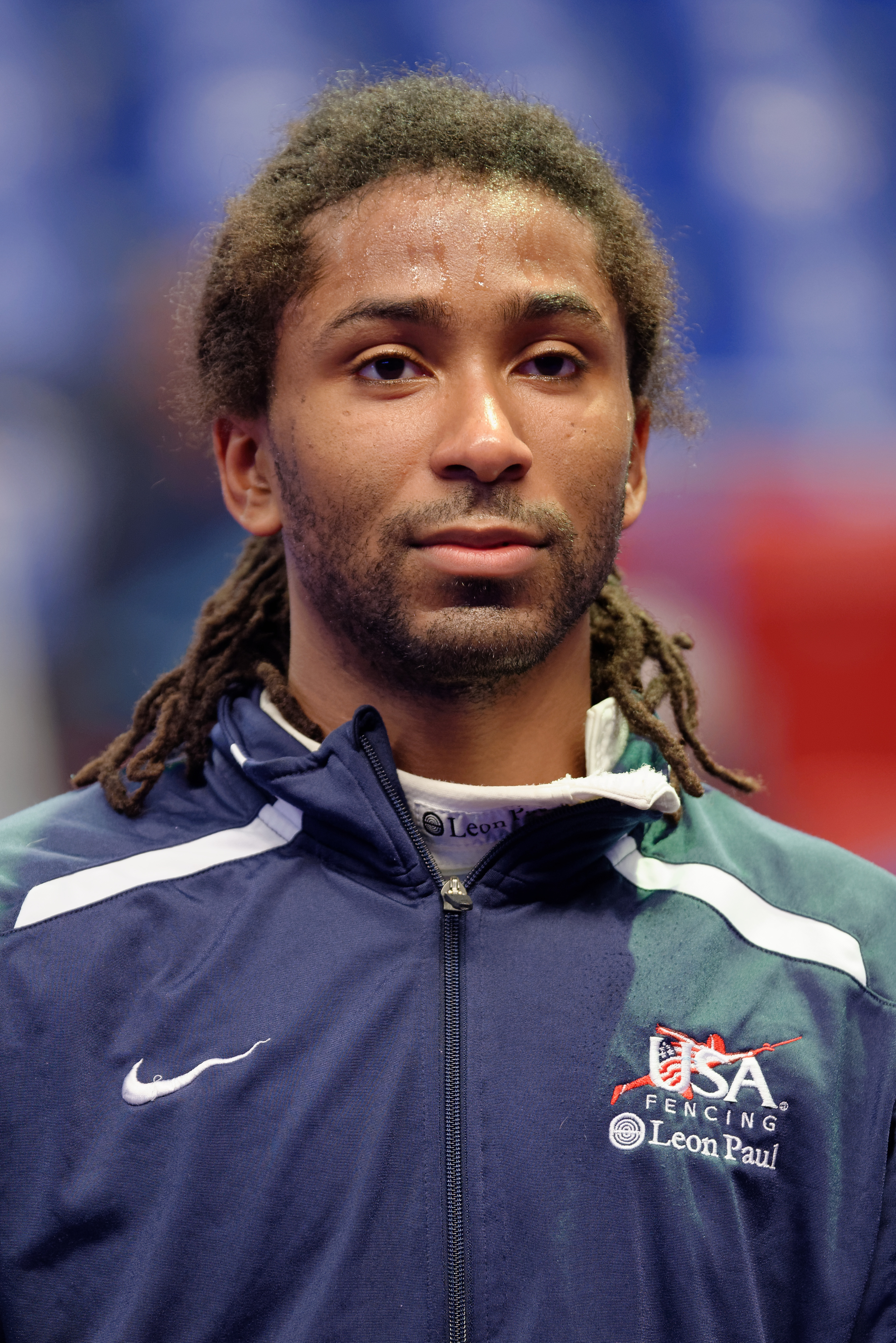
- At the 2016 Paris World Cup

Personal information
- Born: 26 September 1987 (age 38) Cleveland, Ohio
- Height: 5 ft 9 in (1.75 m)
- Weight: 175 lb (79 kg)

Fencing career
- Sport: Fencing
- Country: United States
- Weapon: épée
- Hand: right-handed
- National coach: Kornél Udvarhelyi
- Club: New York Athletic Club
- FIE ranking: current ranking
Medal record
Pan American Championships
Gold medal – first place	2015 Santiago de Chile	Team
Silver medal – second place	2016 Panama City	Individual
Bronze medal – third place	2014 San José	Individual
Bronze medal – third place	2014 San José	Team
Pan American Games
Silver medal – second place	2015 Toronto	Team
Bronze medal – third place	2015 Toronto	Individual

Jason Pryor (born September 26, 1987) is an American épée fencer. He earned two individual bronze medals and a team gold medal at the Pan American Fencing Championships in 2014 and 2015, as well as an individual bronze medal and a team silver medal at the 2015 Pan American Games. He represented the United States in épée at the 2016 Summer Olympics in Rio de Janeiro.

== Biography ==
Pryor's first sport was soccer. He took up fencing when he was 11 after hearing about the sport from a friend. He was taught by coach Bill Reith at the Alcazar Fencing Club. He was later recruited by the Ohio State University, winning a team title in his junior year and earning twice All-American honors.

In 2009 he graduated with a degree in English, hoping to pursue a career as a writer. As a graduation present his parents paid for his travel expenses to the Rio de Janeiro Grand Prix, his first international competition, where he was scouted by USA Fencing. He then joined the resident athlete program at the Olympic Training Center in Colorado Springs.

In the 2012–13 season he joined the USA national senior team. The same year, he won a silver medal at the USA National Championships and took part in his first World Championships. The following season he won his first medal in a major international competition, a bronze at the 2014 Pan American Championships in San José, Costa Rica, followed by another bronze in the team event.

In the 2014–15 season he won the USA National Championships. He reached the quarter-finals at the 2015 Pan American Championships in Santiago de Chile and earned a gold medal in the team competition together with Benjamin Bratton, Jimmy Moody and Ari Simmons. A few months later he took part in the 2015 Pan American Games in Toronto. He reached the semifinals, where he was defeated by reigning Olympic champion Rubén Limardo. In the team event the United States lost to Venezuela in the final, leaving Pryor with a silver medal.

In the 2015–16 season he secured his qualification to the 2016 Summer Olympics as the highest ranked fencer from the Americas zone in the FIE Adjusted Official Ranking. At the Olympics in Rio de Janeiro, he placed 22nd in individual épée.

At the 2016 Pan American Games in Panama, Pryor took the silver medal after being defeated by Yunior Reytor Venet of Cuba in the finals.

== See also ==
- List of USFA Division I National Champions
