= Natalia Sheppard =

British fencer

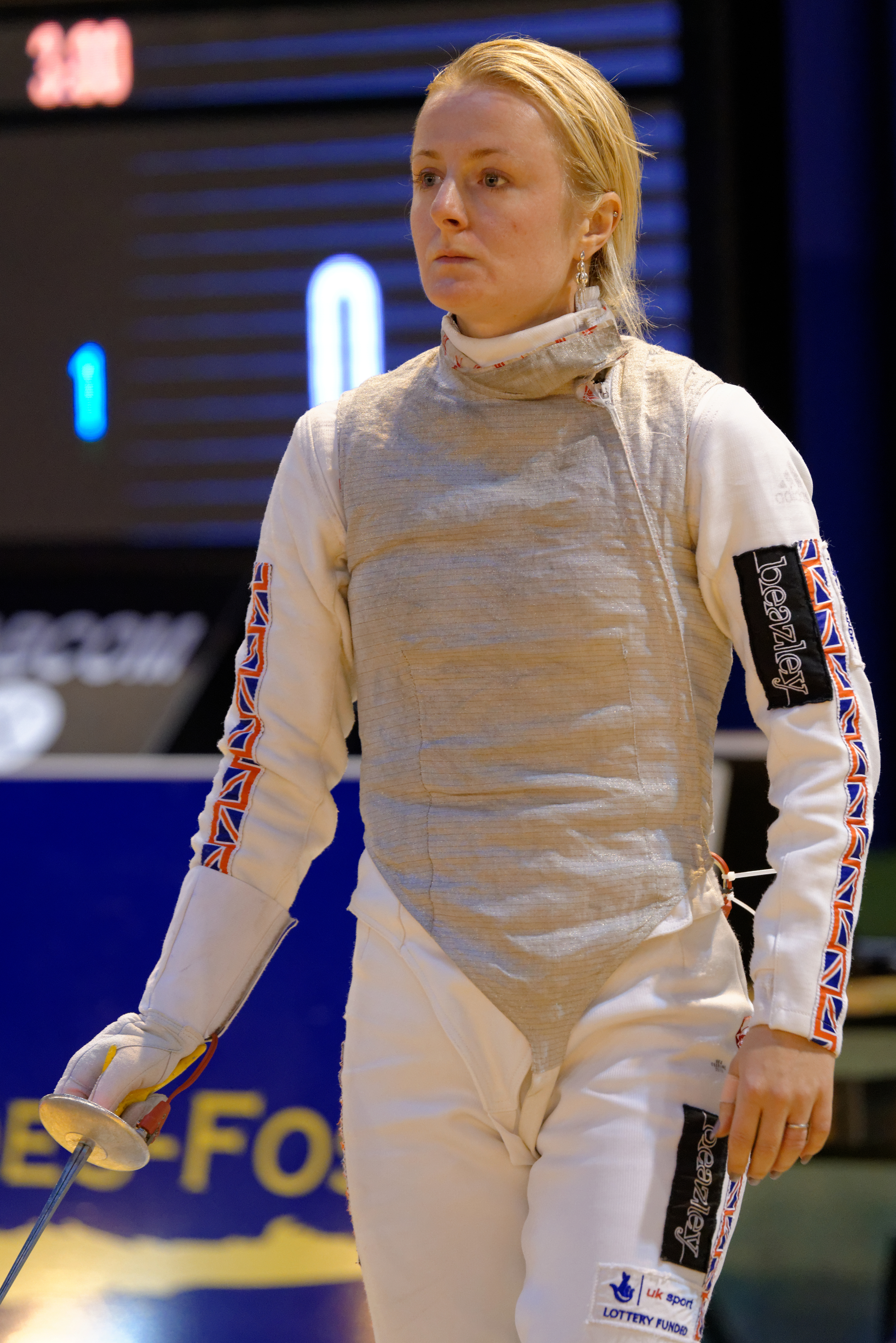

Personal information
- Born: 27 May 1984 (age 42) Gdańsk, Poland
- Home town: Bath, Somerset, United Kingdom
- Height: 1.65 m (5 ft 5 in)
- Weight: 52 kg (115 lb)

Fencing career
- Sport: Fencing
- Weapon: foil
- Hand: right-handed
- National coach: Maciej Wojtkowiak
- FIE ranking: current ranking

Natalia Sheppard (née Więckowska; born 27 May 1984) is a Polish-born British foil fencer, who represented Great Britain at the individual and team events of the 2012 Summer Olympics.

== Career ==
Sheppard was born in Gdańsk, Poland. She took up fencing when she was ten— her sister Irena is also a fencer, specializing in sabre, and took part in the 2008 Summer Olympics. Natalia herself won the Polish national foil championships several times and earned a team gold medal at the 2000 Junior World Fencing Championships in South Bend.

When she was seventeen she came to the United Kingdom to study at the University of Bath and gave up international competition. She graduated in Mathematics and computer science in 2006, then took up law studies. She married a Briton, Gary, in 2007. At his suggestion she came back to the piste and was quickly selected into the British team. Her first major competition bearing the Union Flag was the 2010 European Fencing Championships in Leipzig. She posted a last-16 finish at the 2012 St Petersburg World Cup and the 2014 Cancun World Cup.

Although Great Britain could qualify athletes to the 2012 Summer Olympics through host option, Sheppard was selected to compete in the zone qualifying tournament in Bratislava. She defeated Romania's Cristina Ghiță in the semi-finals to earn one of the two Olympic tickets. In the individual event she defeated teammate Sophie Troiano in the first round, but lost to World No.6 Corinne Maîtrejean of France in the second round. In the team event Sheppard, Troiano and Anna Bentley saw of Egypt in the first round, then met favourites Italy, featuring the bronze, silver and gold medallists of the individual event. Great Britain were crushed 14–42 in the quarter-finals. Sheppard finished the 2011–12 season World No.35, a career best as of 2015.

After the London Games Sheppard joined the British Fencing World Class Programme to prepare for the 2016 Summer Olympics in Rio de Janeiro.
