= 2012 Pan American Fencing Championships =

The 2012 Pan American Fencing Championships were held in Cancún, Mexico from 15 to 20 June.

== Medal summary ==
=== Men's events ===
Event	Gold	Silver	Bronze
Foil	Race Imboden (USA)	Alexander Massialas (USA)	Gerek Meinhardt (USA); Étienne Lalonde-Turbide (CAN)
Épée	Soren Thompson (USA)	Rubén Limardo (VEN)	Weston Kelsey (USA); Tigran Bajgoric (CAN)
Sabre	Joseph Polossifakis (CAN)	Jeff Spear (USA)	Melvin Rodriguez (PUR); James Williams (USA)
Team Foil	United States	Brazil	Canada
Team Épée	Venezuela	United States	Canada
Team Sabre	United States	Canada	Venezuela

=== Women's events ===
Event	Gold	Silver	Bronze
Foil	Lee Kiefer (USA)	Saskia Loretta van Erven Garcia (COL)	Nzingha Prescod (USA); Alanna Goldie (CAN)
Épée	Maya Lawrence (USA)	Jesica Jiménez Luna (PAN)	Courtney Hurley (USA); Sherraine Schalm (CAN)
Sabre	Mariel Zagunis (USA)	Dagmara Wozniak (USA)	María Belén Pérez Maurice (ARG); Sandra Sassine (CAN)
Team Foil	United States	Canada	Venezuela
Team Épée	United States	Brazil	Canada
Team Sabre	United States	Venezuela	Canada

=== Medal table ===
Rank	Nation	Gold	Silver	Bronze	Total
1	United States	10	4	5	19
2	Canada	1	2	9	12
3	Venezuela	1	2	2	5
4	Brazil	0	2	0	2
5	Colombia	0	1	0	1
5	Panama	0	1	0	1
7	Argentina	0	0	1	1
7	Puerto Rico	0	0	1	1
Totals (8 entries)		12	12	18	42
