= Daria Schneider =

American fencer

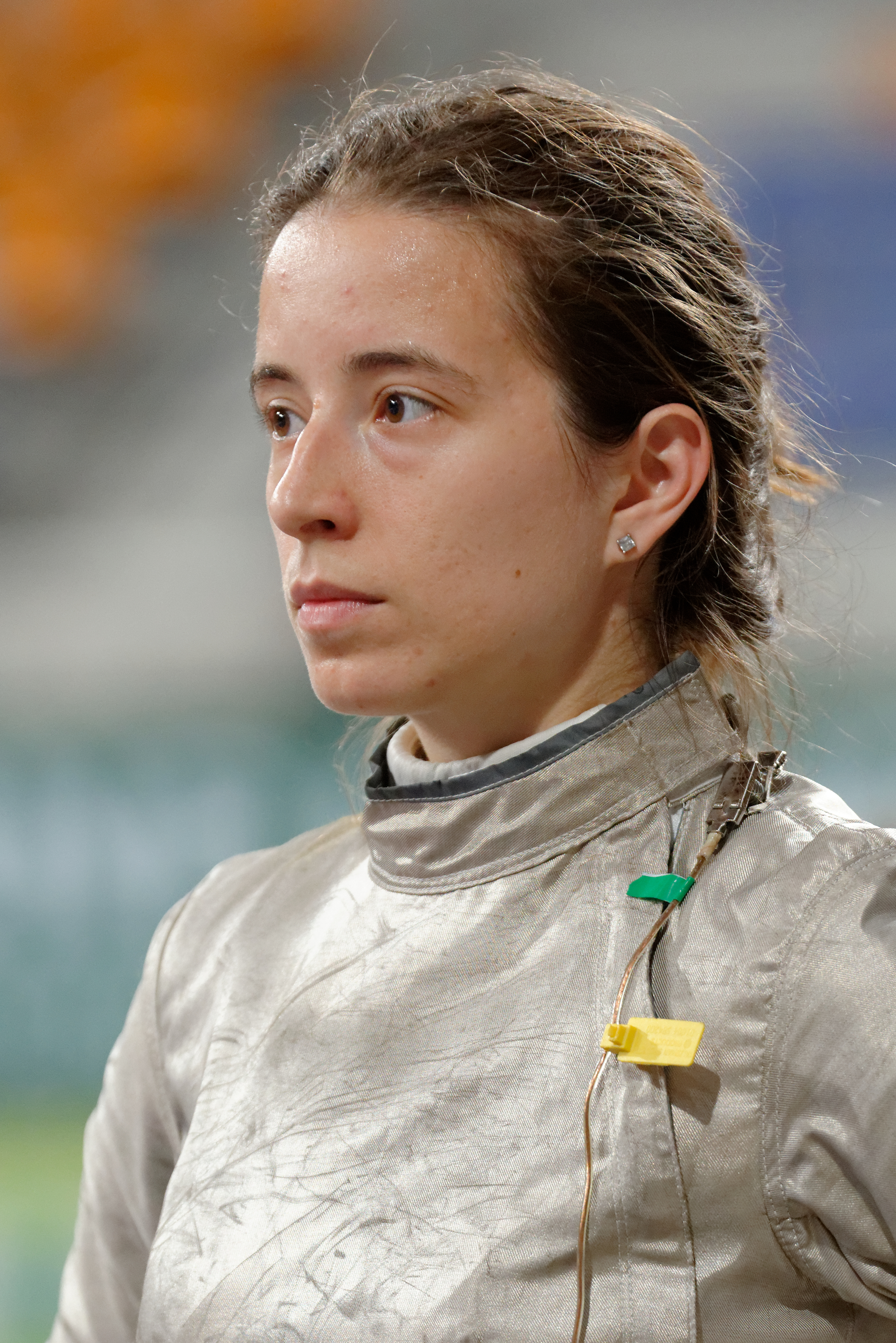

Personal information
- Full name: Daria Hyla Schneider
- Nationality: American
- Born: 21 May 1987 (age 39) Berkeley, California
- Height: 1.7 m (5 ft 7 in)
- Weight: 61 kg (134 lb)

Fencing career
- Sport: Fencing
- Country: USA
- Weapon: sabre
- Hand: right-handed
- National coach: Ed Korfanty
- Club: New York Athletic Club
- Former coach: Ariana Klinkov, Aladar Kogler and Yury Gelman
- FIE ranking: current ranking
Medal record
Women's sabre
Representing United States
World Championships
Bronze medal – third place	2011 Catania	Team sabre
Bronze medal – third place	2012 London	Team sabre

Daria Schneider (born 21 May 1987) is an American sabre fencer. She is a five-time National Team member and a team bronze medalist in the 2011 and 2012 World Fencing Championships.

== Biography ==
Schneider was born in Berkeley, California, but grew up in Brookline, Massachusetts. She played many sports growing up and took up fencing when she was 10 under the coaching of Ariana Klinkov, who orientated her towards sabre. She joined the USA cadet team in 2002.

After high school, she chose to study Russian literature at Columbia University because she wanted to be in New York. She was also interested in training under Yury Gelman. She fenced for the Columbia Lions fencing team. She won the 2007 NCAA Championship, then took a leave of absence to train for the 2008 Summer Olympics. She failed to qualify for the Games, but she was selected in 2009 into the USA senior team.

After her graduation in 2010, she was named assistant fencing coach. In 2011, she won the National Championships in Women's Sabre and that same year she won a bronze medal in Belgium at the first Olympic qualifier of the season. She was the interim head coach at Columbia in 2011 and became first-ever female head coach of a men's Division I NCAA program. She became director of fencing operations in 2013–14.

She was the head coach of the Cornell fencing team, starting with the 2016–2017 season and is currently the head coach of the Harvard fencing team

== See also ==
- List of NCAA fencing champions
