= Fencing at the 2015 Pan American Games – Men's épée =

Men's épée at the 2015 Pan American Games
- Venue: Toronto Pan Am Sports Centre
- Dates: July 21
- Competitors: 18 from 10 nations

Medalists
Gold medal	Rubén Limardo	Venezuela
Silver medal	José Dominguez	Argentina
Bronze medal	Hugues Boisvert-Simard	Canada
Bronze medal	Jason Pryor	United States

The men's épée competition of the fencing events at the 2015 Pan American Games was held on July 21 at the Toronto Pan Am Sports Centre.

The épée competition consisted of a qualification round followed by a single-elimination bracket with a bronze medal match between the two semifinal losers. Fencing was done to 15 touches or to the completion of three three-minute rounds if neither fencer reached 15 touches by then. At the end of time, the higher-scoring fencer was the winner; a tie resulted in an additional one-minute sudden-death time period. This sudden-death period was further modified by the selection of a draw-winner beforehand; if neither fencer scored a touch during the minute, the predetermined draw-winner won the bout.

== Schedule ==
All times are Eastern Daylight Time (UTC-4).

Date	Time	Round
July 21, 2015	12:35	Qualification pools
July 21, 2015	14:15	Round of 16
July 21, 2015	15:12	Quarterfinals
July 21, 2015	18:53	Semifinals
July 21, 2015	19:53	Final

== Results ==
The following are the results of the event.

=== Qualification ===
All 18 fencers were put into three groups of six athletes, were each fencer would have five individual matches. The top 16 athletes overall would qualify for next round.

Rank	Name	Nation	Victories	TG	TR	Dif.	Notes
1	Hugues Boisvert-Simard	Canada	4	23	14	+9	Q
2	Rubén Limardo	Venezuela	4	22	13	+ 9	Q
3	Jason Pryor	United States	4	24	16	+8	Q
4	Francisco Limardo	Venezuela	4	20	16	+4	Q
5	Reynier Henrique	Cuba	4	13	10	+3	Q
6	Ryan Rodriguez	Mexico	3	19	12	+7	Q
7	Benjamin Bratton	United States	3	21	16	+5	Q
8	Jhon Rodriguez	Colombia	3	20	19	+1	Q
9	Paris Inostroza	Chile	3	9	12	-3	Q
10	Gustavo Coqueco	Colombia	2	16	17	-1	Q
11	Alessandro Taccani	Argentina	2	11	13	-2	Q
12	Athos Schwantes	Brazil	2	18	21	-3	Q
13	José Dominguez	Argentina	2	13	16	-3	Q
14	Nicolas Ferreira	Brazil	1	14	18	-4	Q
14	Maxime Brinck-Croteau	Canada	1	14	18	-4	Q
16	Yunior Reytor	Cuba	1	17	23	-6	Q
17	Omar Carrillo	Mexico	1	15	24	-9	
18	Gerber Morales	Guatemala	1	9	20	-11	

=== Elimination round ===
Round of 16
1	Hugues Boisvert-Simard (CAN)	15
16	Yunior Reytor (CUB)	10
9	Paris Inostroza (CHI)	12
8	Jhon Rodriguez (COL)	15
5	Reynier Henrique (CUB)	13
12	Athos Schwantes (BRA)	14
13	José Dominguez (ARG)	10
4	Francisco Limardo (VEN)	9
3	Jason Pryor (USA)	15
14	Nicolas Ferreira (BRA)	12
11	Alessandro Taccani (ARG)	15
6	Ryan Rodriguez (MEX)	11
7	Benjamin Bratton (USA)	15
10	Gustavo Coqueco (COL)	12
15	Maxime Brinck-Croteau (CAN)	0
2	Rubén Limardo (VEN)	15

Quarterfinals
1	Hugues Boisvert-Simard (CAN)	15
8	Jhon Rodriguez (COL)	10
12	Athos Schwantes (BRA)	6
13	José Dominguez (ARG)	15
3	Jason Pryor (USA)	15
11	Alessandro Taccani (ARG)	7
7	Benjamin Bratton (USA)	8
2	Rubén Limardo (VEN)	15

Semifinals
1	Hugues Boisvert-Simard (CAN)	11
13	José Dominguez (ARG)	15
3	Jason Pryor (USA)	9
2	Rubén Limardo (VEN)	15

Final
13	José Dominguez (ARG)	6
2	Rubén Limardo (VEN)	15
