= Lubna Al-Omair =

Saudi Arabian fencer

Personal information
- Born: 14 April 1987 (age 39)

Sport
- Sport: Fencing

Lubna Al-Omair (Arabic: لبنى العمير; born April 14, 1987) is a Saudi Arabian fencer. She competed in the women's foil event at the 2016 Summer Olympics.

She is from Khobar, Saudi Arabia. She is 1.52 metres tall, and weighs 45 kg.

The International Olympic Committee, to promote participation by Saudi Arabian women in sports, identified her after a "technical analysis" and decided to give her an "exceptional" wild card opportunity to fence at the 2016 Olympics in Women’s Individual Foil. She was part of the second contingent of female Olympians who represented Saudi Arabia at the Olympic Games. She became the first female to fence for Saudi Arabia at an Olympics.

She lost in the first round by a score of 15-0, to Tais Rochel, a Brazilian fencer ranked number 80 in the world. The match took 1 minute and 44 seconds.
