= Doris Willette =

American fencer (born 1988)

Personal information
- Full name: Doris Willette
- Born: February 11, 1988 (age 38) Lafayette, California, USA
- Height: 5 ft 2 in (1.57 m)
- Weight: 134 lb (61 kg)

Sport
- Country: United States of America
- Sport: Fencing
- Event: foil
Medal record
Pan American Games
Gold medal – first place	2011 Guadalajara	Team foil

Doris Willette (born February 11, 1988) is an American foil fencer. Her mother is an immigrant from Taiwan. Willette was named to the U.S. Olympic team at the 2012 Summer Olympics in the women's foil team competition.

Willette is a graduate of Penn State University. She won NCAA Championships in foil in 2009 and 2011. Willette won a gold medal in the team foil competition at the 2011 Pan American Games.

== See also ==
- List of Pennsylvania State University Olympians
- List of NCAA fencing champions
