= Cody Mattern =

American fencer

Personal information
- Born: February 23, 1981 (age 45) Reno, Nevada, United States

Sport
- Country: United States
- Sport: Fencing
- Event: Men's epee

Achievements and titles
- World finals: 2010 World Fencing Championships 2012 World Fencing Championships
- National finals: 1998 Junior Men's Épée; 1999 Junior Men's Epee; 2001 Division 1A Men's Épée; 2001 Division 1 Men's Épée
Medal record
Representing United States
World Championships
| Gold medal – first place | 2012 Kiev | Team épée |
| Silver medal – second place | 2010 Paris | Team épée |
Pan American Games
| Gold medal – first place | 2011 Guadalajara | Team épée |

Cody Mattern (born February 23, 1981) is an American fencer. He competed in the individual and team épée events at the 2004 Summer Olympics. He coached at the Northwest Fencing Center, in Beaverton, Oregon.

== Fencing ==
He started fencing at Northwest Fencing Center, in 1996. In 1998 and 1999, he won the Junior National Championships. In 2001 he won Division 1A, and Division 1 National Championships. He won the silver at a World Cup Grand Prix. He was an Olympic épée fencer at the 2004 Summer Olympics. Cody was on the men's Épée team that rolled in at second place at the 2010 World Fencing Championships, in Paris. He also fenced at the 2012 World Fencing Championships Kiev, winning the Gold in men's Team Épée.

== See also ==
- List of USFA Division I National Champions
- List of USFA Hall of Fame members
