= Taís Rochel =

Brazilian fencer

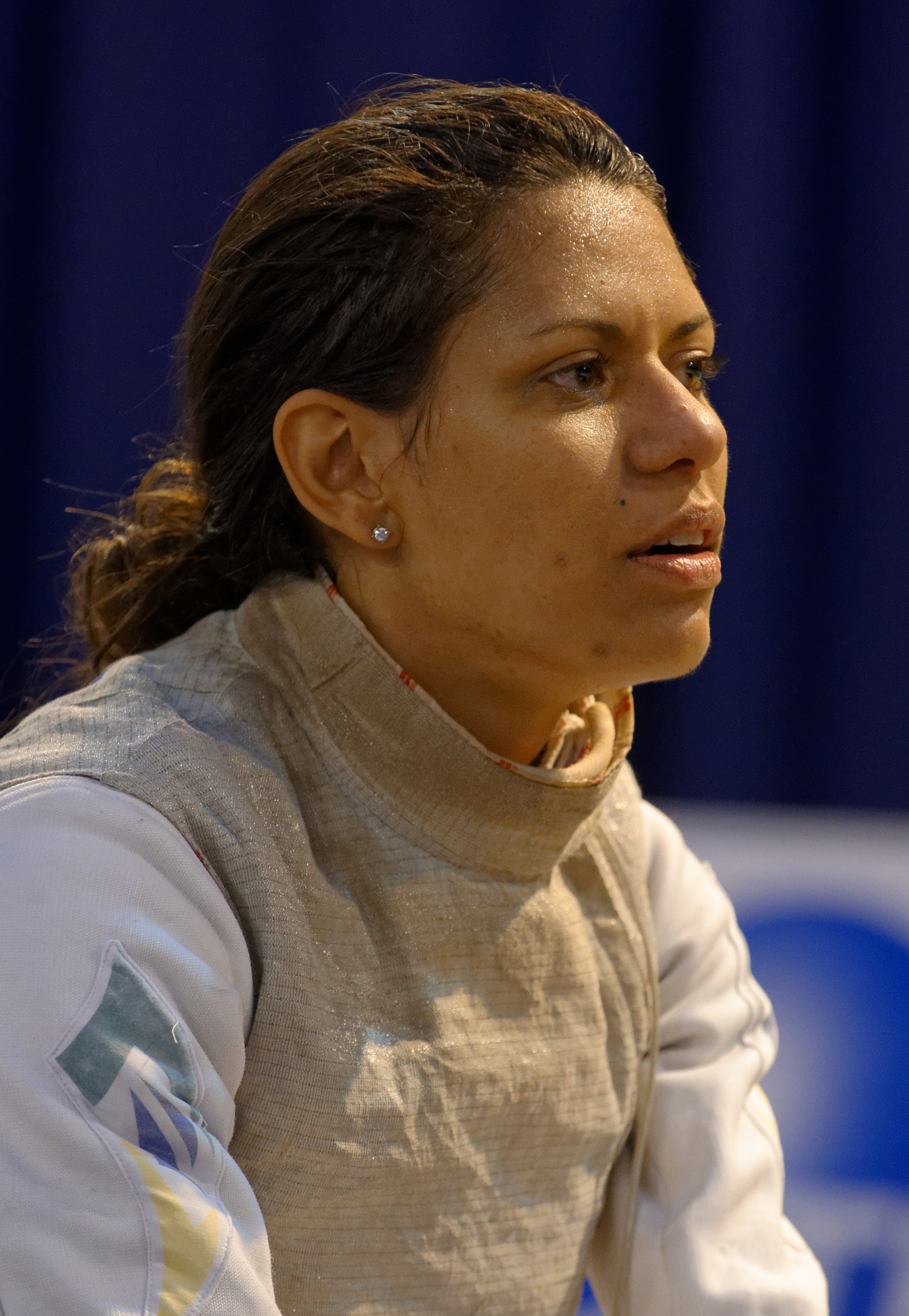
- Rochel in 2015

Personal information
- Born: 16 October 1983 (age 42)

Sport
- Sport: Fencing

Taís Rochel (born 16 October 1983) is a Brazilian fencer. She competed in the women's foil event at the 2016 Summer Olympics. In the first round, she defeated Saudi Arabian Lubna Al-Omair by the score of 15–0. The match took 1 minute and 44 seconds.
