= Kelleigh Ryan =

Canadian fencer (born 1987)

Kelleigh Ryan OLY
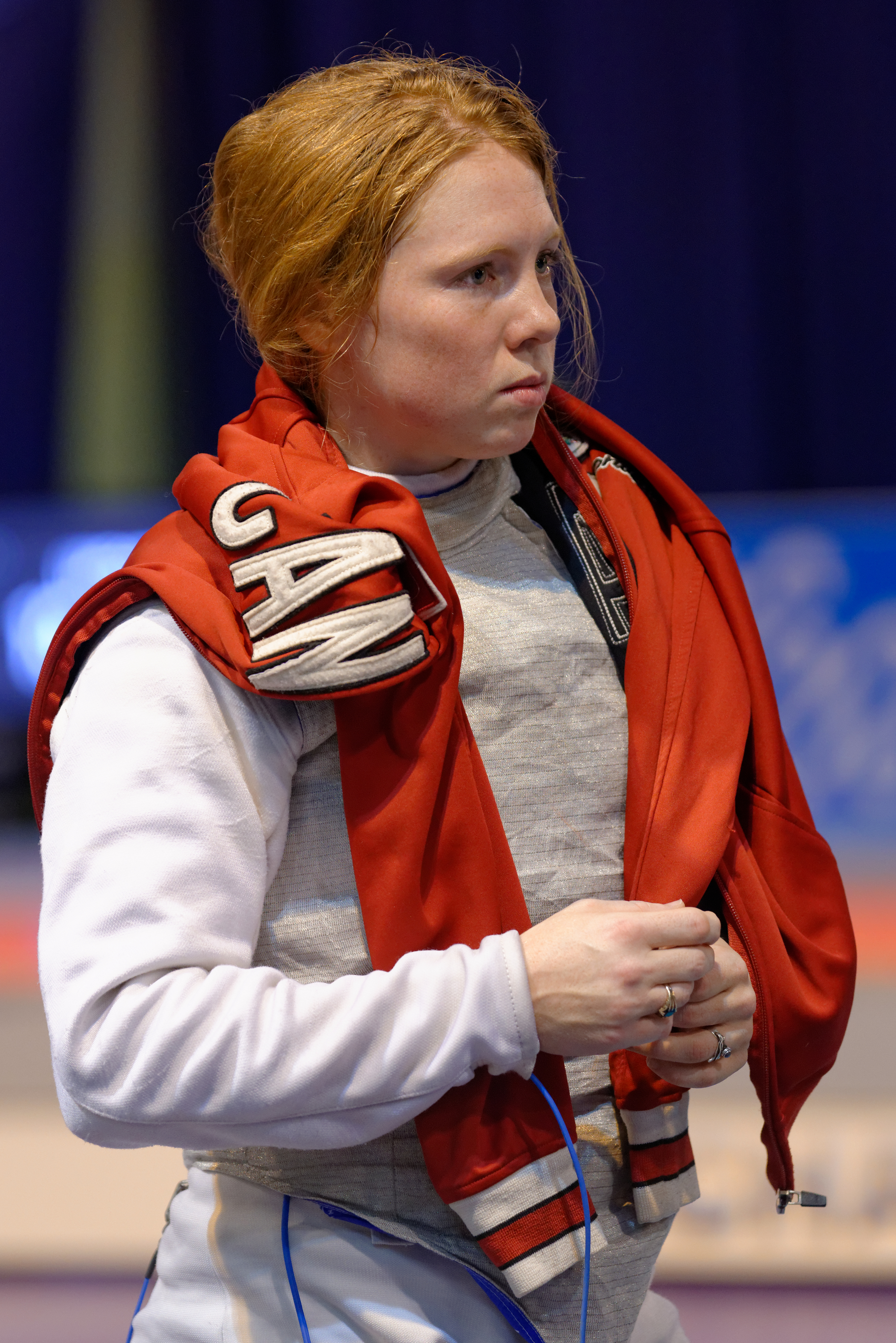
- Ryan in 2014

Personal information
- Born: January 15, 1987 (age 39) Ottawa, Ontario

Fencing career
- Sport: Fencing
- Country: Canada
- Weapon: Foil
Medal record
Pan American Games
Gold medal – first place	2015 Toronto	Team
Silver medal – second place	2011 Guadalajara	Team
Pan American Championships
Gold medal – first place	2022 Asuncion	Team foil
Silver medal – second place	2008 Querétaro	Team
Silver medal – second place	2009 San Salvador	Team
Silver medal – second place	2010 San José	Team
Silver medal – second place	2011 Reno	Team
Silver medal – second place	2012 Cancún	Team
Silver medal – second place	2013 Cartagena	Team
Silver medal – second place	2014 San José	Individual
Silver medal – second place	2014 San José	Team
Silver medal – second place	2015 Santiago	Team
Silver medal – second place	2016 Panama City	Team
Silver medal – second place	2017 Montréal	Team
Silver medal – second place	2018 Havana	Individual
Silver medal – second place	2018 Havana	Team
Silver medal – second place	2019 Toronto	Team
Bronze medal – third place	2016 Panama City	Individual
Bronze medal – third place	2019 Toronto	Individual

Kelleigh Ryan (born January 15, 1987) is a Canadian Olympic fencer.

== Career ==
Ryan won a silver medal at the 2011 Pan American Games and a gold medal at the 2015 Pan American Games in Toronto, both in the team event.

She has also participated in the Pan American Fencing Championships where she won silver medals in the foil team event every year from 2008 to 2019, silver medals in the individual event in 2014 and 2018 and bronze medals in the individual event in 2016 and 2019.

Ryan represented Canada at the 2020 Summer Olympics.

She competed at the 2022 World Fencing Championships held in Cairo, Egypt.
