= Alanna Goldie =

Canadian fencer (born 1994)

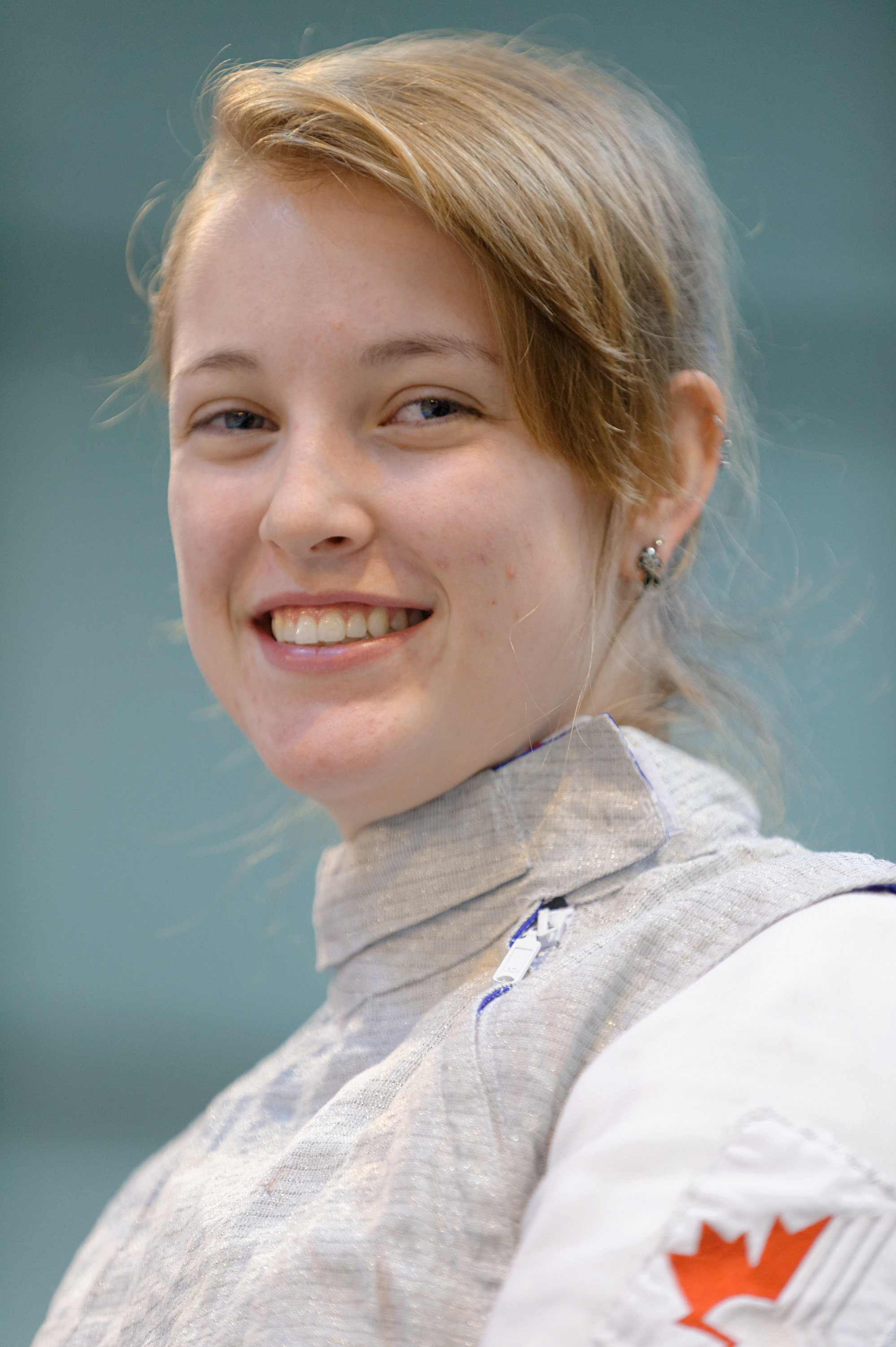
- Goldie in 2014

Personal information
- Born: April 17, 1994 (age 32) Calgary, Alberta
- Height: 5 ft 10 in (178 cm)

Fencing career
- Sport: Fencing
- Country: Canada
- Weapon: Foil
- Hand: Right
- Club: Gladiators Fencing Club
Medal record
Pan American Games
Gold medal – first place	2015 Toronto	Team
Silver medal – second place	2011 Guadalajara	Team
Silver medal – second place	2019 Lima	Team
Bronze medal – third place	2015 Toronto	Individual
Pan American Championships
Silver medal – second place	2011 Reno	Team
Silver medal – second place	2012 Cancún	Team
Silver medal – second place	2013 Cartagena	Team
Silver medal – second place	2014 San José	Team
Silver medal – second place	2015 Santiago	Team
Silver medal – second place	2016 Panama City	Team
Silver medal – second place	2017 Montréal	Team
Silver medal – second place	2018 Havana	Team
Bronze medal – third place	2012 Cancún	Individual
Bronze medal – third place	2013 Cartagena	Individual
Bronze medal – third place	2016 Panama City	Individual
Youth Olympic Games
Bronze medal – third place	2010 Singapore	Mixed NOC Team

Alanna Goldie (born April 17, 1994) is a Canadian Olympic fencer.

She participated in the 2010 Youth Olympics where she came fourth in the individual foil event and won a bronze medal in the mixed NOC team.

Her first senior international competition was the 2011 Pan American Games where she won a silver medal in the team foil event. She also participated in the 2015 Pan American Games where she won a gold medal in the team foil event and a bronze medal in the individual foil event. She won a silver medal at the 2019 Pan American Games in the team event. She went on to compete at the Tokyo 2020 Olympics finishing 5th in the Women's Foil Team Event.

She has also participated in the Pan American Fencing Championships where she won silver medals in the foil team event every year from 2011 to 2018 and bronze medals in the individual foil event in 2012, 2013 and 2016.
