= Johana Fuenmayor =

Venezuelan fencer (born 1979)

Personal information
- Born: July 17, 1979 (age 46) Maracaibo, Venezuela
- Height: 1.54 m (5 ft 1/2 in)
- Weight: 48 kg (106 lb)

Fencing career
- Sport: Fencing
- Country: Venezuela
- Weapon: épée
- Hand: right-handed
- National coach: German Moreno
- FIE ranking: current ranking
Medal record
Pan American Games
Bronze medal – third place	2011 Guadalajara	Team foil
South American Games
Gold medal – first place	2010 Medellin	Team foil

Johana Beatriz Fuenmayor Choles (born July 17, 1979) is a Venezuelan épée fencer.

== Career ==
She qualified to the women's foil event of the 2012 Summer Olympics through the zone tournament for the Americas. She defeated 15–9 Egypt's Eman El Gammal in the first round, but lost 4–15 in the next round to eventual Italian silver medallist Arianna Errigo.

== Personal life ==
She is a member of the Church of Jesus Christ of Latter-day Saints.
