= Yeisser Ramirez =

Cuban-American fencer

Personal information
- Nationality: United States
- Born: 5 November 1986 (age 39) Cuba
- Height: 6'6
- Weight: 190 lb (86 kg)

Sport
- Sport: Fencing
- Event: épée

Yeisser Ramirez (born November 5, 1986) is a Cuban-American épée fencer.

== Biography ==
Ramirez was born in Cuba to Idalmis Ferrer and Francisco Ramirez. He learned to fence épée barefoot in Guantánamo Bay. Ramirez immigrated to the U.S. in 2007 at 21 years old, after being drawn to receive an American visa in a Cuban lottery program. He represented Team USA at the Senior World Championships in 2015.

Ramirez represented Team USA in the 2020 Tokyo Olympics.

== Career highlights ==
- 2012 Division 1 Men's Épée National Championships, 2nd (individual)
- 2013 Division 1 Men's Épée National Championships, 3rd (individual)
- 2015 Pan American Championships, 12th (individual)
- 2020 Tokyo Olympics (individual & team)

== Medal record ==
=== Grand Prix ===
Date	Location	Event	Position
2024-01-31	Doha, Qatar	Individual Men's Épée	3rd
