= Monica Peterson =

Canadian fencer

Personal information
- Born: 15 January 1984 (age 42)
- Height: 163 cm (5.35 ft)
- Weight: 56 kg (123 lb)

Sport
- Country: Canada
- Sport: Fencing
- Event: Foil
Medal record
Women's Fencing
Representing Canada
Pan American Games
Silver medal – second place	2011 Guadalajara	Team Foil
Bronze medal – third place	2011 Guadalajara	Individual Foil

Monica Peterson is a Canadian female fencer. At the 2012 Summer Olympics she competed in the Women's foil, defeated 10-15 in the second round.
