= Sophie Troiano =

British fencer

Personal information
- Born: 18 March 1987 (age 39) London, England

Sport
- Sport: Fencing

Sophie Troiano (born 18 March 1987) is a British fencer. She has represented Great Britain in both the women's individual and team foil events and in June 2012 she was chosen to represent Great Britain in the 2012 London Olympics. Troiano studied at Christ Church, Oxford.
