= Bia Bulcão =

Brazilian fencer (born 1993)

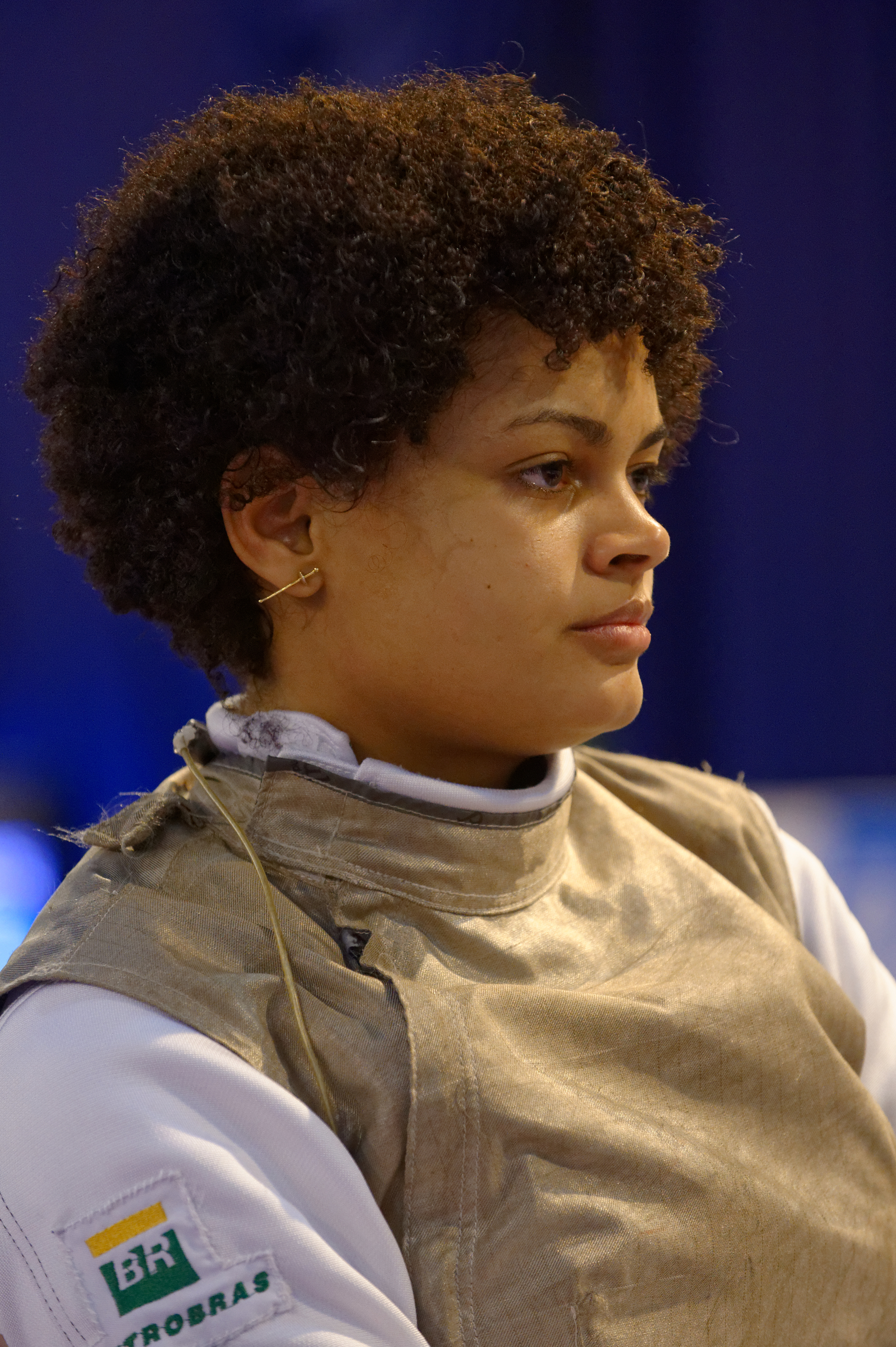

Personal information
- Full name: Ana Beatriz di Rienzo Bulcão
- Born: 4 December 1993 (age 32)

Sport
- Sport: Fencing
Medal record
Women's fencing
Representing Brazil
Pan American Games
Bronze medal – third place	2019 Lima	Individual foil
Pan American Championships
Bronze medal – third place	2024 Lima	Team
Bronze medal – third place	2025 Rio de Janeiro	Team
Bronze medal – third place	2026 Lima	Team
South American Games
Gold medal – first place	2026 Santa Fe	Individual foil
Silver medal – second place	2026 Santa Fe	Team foil
Bronze medal – third place	2022 Asunción	Individual foil
Bronze medal – third place	2022 Asunción	Team foil

Ana Beatriz "Bia" di Rienzo Bulcão (born 4 December 1993) is a Brazilian fencer. She competed in the women's foil event at the 2016 Summer Olympics. In 2017, she won the bronze medal in the women's team foil event at the 2017 Pan American Fencing Championships held in Montreal, Canada.

== See also ==
- List of Pennsylvania State University Olympians
