= Saskia Loretta van Erven Garcia =

Dutch-Colombian fencer (born 1987)

Saskia Loretta van Erven García
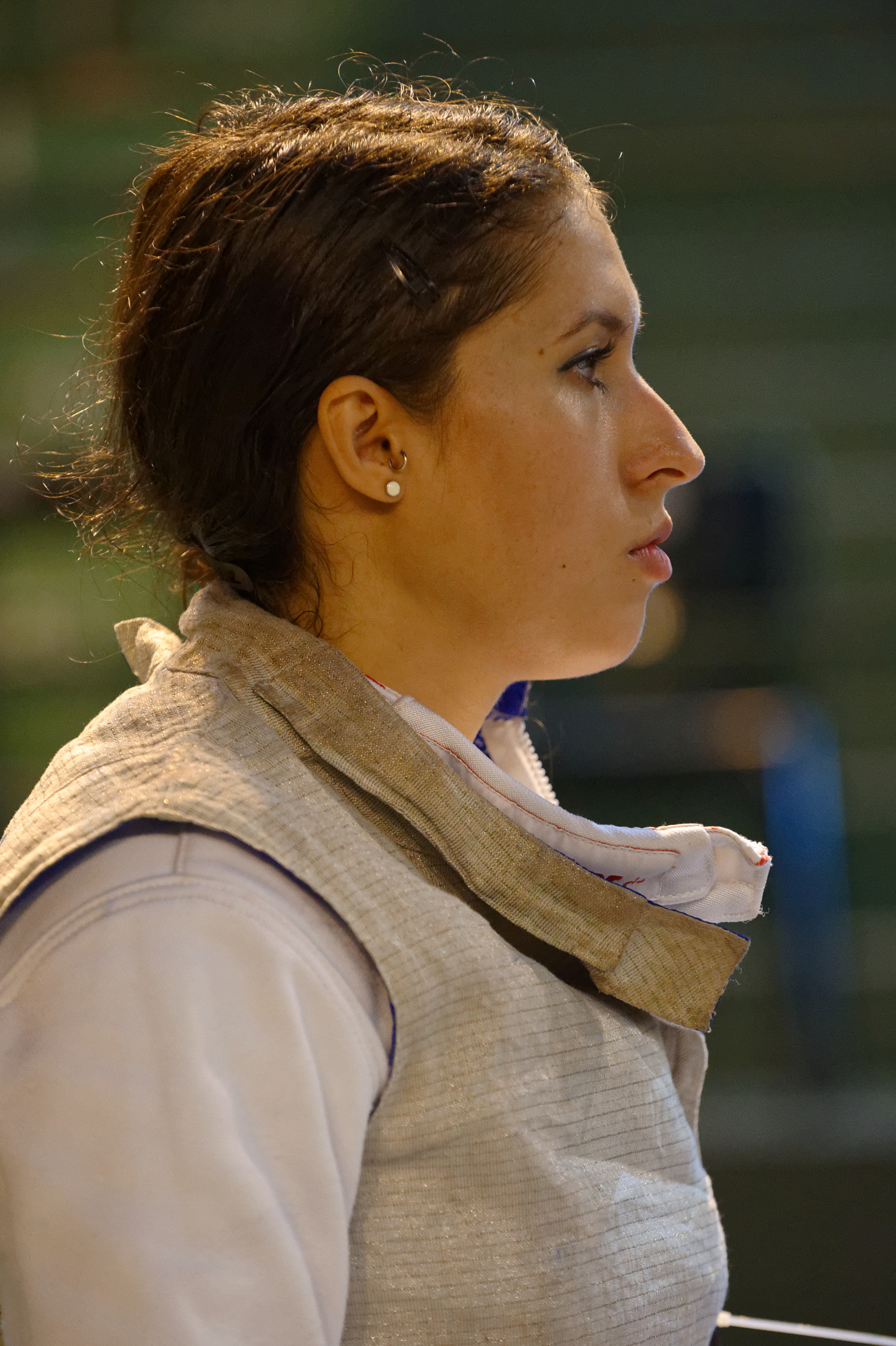

Personal information
- Born: 9 August 1987 (age 38) Rotterdam, Netherlands
- Height: 1.70 m (5 ft 7 in)
- Weight: 64 kg (141 lb)

Fencing career
- Sport: Fencing
- Weapon: foil
- Hand: right-handed
- Club: SchermCentrum Amsterdam / Valle del Cauca
- FIE ranking: current ranking
Medal record
Representing Colombia
Women's fencing
Pan American Games
Silver medal – second place	2015 Toronto	Individual foil

Saskia Loretta van Erven García (born August 29, 1987, in Rotterdam, Netherlands) is a Dutch-Colombian female fencer. At the 2012 Summer Olympics she competed in the Women's foil, and was defeated 9–14 in the second round by Carolin Golubytskyi. She was also defeated in the second round of the 2016 Olympics, by Aida Mohamed, 15–12.

Van Erven García studied journalism in Amsterdam, while she trained at SchermCentrum Amsterdam. Although she was born and raised in the Netherlands, she changed her fencing nationality to her mother's country Colombia in 2011, and represented Colombia at the 2012 Summer Olympics. Van Erven García's mother comes from Cali, Colombia.

In 2018 she started training at Frascati Scherma, in Italy, where she was followed by Luca Papale and Fabio Galli.

She took up fencing at the age of 6 because her parents were involved in the sport. Indeed, her mother, Gloria Garcia Pacheco, also represented Colombia internationally, winning a gold medal in the team foil at the 1971 Pan-American Games.

She represented Colombia at the 2020 Summer Olympics.
