= Benjamin Bratton =

American fencer

Personal information
- Born: 18 June 1985 (age 41) Queens, New York, United States

Sport
- Sport: Fencing
Medal record
Men's fencing
Representing United States
World Championships
Gold medal – first place	2012 Kyiv	Team épée
Silver medal – second place	2010 Paris	Team épée
Pan American Championships
Silver medal – second place	2015 Toronto	Team épée

Benjamin Bratton (born June 18, 1985) is a three-time fencing all-American and a former member of the United States fencing team. As a national team member, he competed in the 2006 World Fencing Championships in Turin, Italy; the 2009 World Fencing Championships in Antalya, Turkey; the 2010 World Fencing Championships in Paris; and the 2012 World Fencing Championships in Kyiv.

== Biography ==
Bratton was born in Queens, New York, and is the oldest child of Deborah Hanson and Dwight Bratton. With both parents constantly working to support Benjamin and his two sisters, young Bratton's mother often pushed him into sports, hoping to keep him away from the trouble and distractions of an inner-city neighborhood.

As coworkers, Deborah became acquainted with American Saber Champion and 1984 Olympic Bronze medalist Peter Westbrook. Having recently created the Peter Westbrook Foundation, Westbrook invited Benjamin to participate in his Saturday Fencing Program to be taught by himself and other fencing Olympians. Benjamin gravitated to the sport almost instantly:

I was immediately intoxicated by the sport and was amazed by the way fencers moved and looked on the strip. It was an incredible experience to be taught by people who went to the Olympic Games. At that time, a goal like that wasn't even fathomable for me. I just mimicked the teachers I would see fencing and I would practice footwork drills that they gave me in the basement of my house. Before time I was had become one of the strongest in my class.

== Fencing career ==
=== Youth fencing ===
Bratton was invited to join the PWF Elite Athlete Scholarship program. Under the tutelage of Dr. Aladar Kogler (then the U.S. National Men's épée coach), Bratton was placed under a strict training regimen, including group and private classes, along with training camps around the globe with some of the best youth fencers in the world.

In 2000, Bratton began training with Hungarian fencing coach, Kornel Udvarhelyi. Under Udvarhelyi, Bratton was able to harness his natural speed and strength and qualified for the first of his six Junior World Championship performances. Ranked as the number one American fencer under 17 and the number 3 fencer under 20, it was here that Bratton was able to make his first impact on the international stage when, at age 16, he would win the bronze medal at the event becoming one of the first Americans to do so in almost 25 years.

Prior to college, Bratton was a member of the 2002 Junior/Cadet United States World Championship Fencing Team.

=== Collegiate career ===
In 2002, with his successes along the Junior – and now Senior – fencing circuit adding up, Bratton would become one of the top men's épée recruits for the 2003 season, being courted by fencing programs across the country. Ultimately, in order to continue training in a manner that he had been accustomed, and to continue to work with the network of support that had surrounded him in New York, Bratton chose to attend St. John's University in the Fall of 2003.

He led the 2007 St John's University fencing team to fourth place at the 2007 NCAA tournament, with an individual silver medal in épée. Awarded a full athletic scholarship, Benjamin went on to earn a master's degree in Psychology while working to leave his mark on the NCAA fencing circuit and also accomplishing his goal of making his first US National Team. Under the guidance of Red Storm coach Yuri Gelman, Bratton was able to successfully balance academics and athletic aspirations. Over the course of the next four years, Bratton would be named to the All-American team three times, with two individual silver medals and one silver team medal at the NCAA Fencing Championships.

In addition, upon his commencement from the St. Johns University, Bratton was awarded the Frank G. Haggerty trophy which is bestowed upon the “outstanding student athlete of the year”.

== See also ==
- List of USFA Division I National Champions
