= Nataly Michel =

Mexican fencer (born 1990)

Personal information
- Born: 9 July 1990 (age 35) Ciudad Guzmán, Jalisco, Mexico

Sport
- Sport: Fencing
Medal record
Pan American Games
Bronze medal – third place	2011 Guadalajara	Individual foil
Bronze medal – third place	2015 Toronto	Team foil
Bronze medal – third place	2019 Lima	Team foil
Bronze medal – third place	2023 Santiago	Team foil

Nataly Michel (born 9 July 1990) is a Mexican fencer. She competed in the women's foil event at the 2016 Summer Olympics.
