= Women's foil at the 2017 World Fencing Championships =

- Venue: Arena Leipzig
- Location: Leipzig, Germany
- Dates: 21 July

Medalists
gold medal	Inna Deriglazova	Russia
silver medal	Alice Volpi	Italy
bronze medal	Arianna Errigo	Italy
bronze medal	Ysaora Thibus	France

The Women's foil event of the 2017 World Fencing Championships was held on 21 July 2017. The qualification was held on 19 July 2017.

== Draw ==
=== Finals ===
Semi-finals
(Russia) Inna Deriglazova	15
(Italy) Arianna Errigo	6
(France) Ysaora Thibus	12
(Italy) Alice Volpi	15

Final
(Russia) Inna Deriglazova	14
(Italy) Alice Volpi	13

=== Top half ===
==== Section 1 ====
Round of 64
1	(Russia) Deriglazova	15
64	(Czech Republic) Bímová	4
33	(Hungary) Kreiss	15
32	(Hong Kong) Cheung	4
17	(Poland) Łyczbińska	15
48	(Argentina) Terni	4
49	(Argentina) Mormandi	7
16	(Russia) Martyanova	15
9	(South Korea) Nam	15
56	(Hong Kong) Lau	8
41	(Romania) Boldor	9
24	(France) Blaze	15
25	(Italy) Mancini	15
40	(Germany) Golubytskyi	14
57	(China) Fu	10
8	(Canada) Harvey	9

Round of 32
1	(Russia) Deriglazova	15
33	(Hungary) Kreiss	14
17	(Poland) Łyczbińska	13
16	(Russia) Martyanova	12
9	(South Korea) Nam	15
24	(France) Blaze	8
25	(Italy) Mancini	15
57	(China) Fu	9

Round of 16
1	(Russia) Deriglazova	15
17	(Poland) Łyczbińska	10
9	(South Korea) Nam	5
25	(Italy) Mancini	15

Quarterfinals
1	(Russia) Deriglazova	15
25	(Italy) Mancini	9

==== Section 2 ====
Round of 64
5	(United States) Ross	13
60	(Japan) Kano	15
37	(United States) Lu	15
28	(Greece) Kontochchristopoulou	12
21	(Hungary) Lupkovics	13
44	(Turkey) Karamete	15
53	(Hungary) Kondricz	6
12	(France) Guyart	15
13	(Russia) Tripapina	15
52	(Japan) Kikuchi	3
45	(Hong Kong) Liu	8
20	(Singapore) Berthier	15
29	(Poland) Łyczbińska	4
36	(Japan) Nishioka	15
61	(China) Wu	4
4	(Italy) Errigo	15

Round of 32
60	(Japan) Kano	15
37	(United States) Lu	7
44	(Turkey) Karamete	12
12	(France) Guyart	15
13	(Russia) Tripapina	15
20	(Singapore) Berthier	10
36	(Japan) Nishioka	8
4	(Italy) Errigo	15

Round of 16
60	(Japan) Kano	10
12	(France) Guyart	15
13	(Russia) Tripapina	6
4	(Italy) Errigo	15

Quarterfinals
12	(France) Guyart	5
4	(Italy) Errigo	15

=== Bottom half ===
==== Section 3 ====
Round of 64
3	(France) Thibus	15
62	(Sweden) Schreiber	6
35	(Germany) Hampel	15
30	(Netherlands) Rentier	12
19	(Colombia) Van Erven	15
46	(Venezuela) Giménez	8
51	(South Korea) Hong	15
14	(France) Ranvier	8
11	(South Korea) Jeon	15
54	(Egypt) El-Sharkawy	3
43	(Japan) Azuma	15
22	(Canada) Goldie	14
27	(United States) Massialas
38	(Germany) Sauer	w/o
59	(Hong Kong) Lee	9
6	(Italy) Batini	15

Round of 32
3	(France) Thibus	15
35	(Germany) Hampel	7
19	(Colombia) Van Erven	6
51	(South Korea) Hong	15
11	(South Korea) Jeon	14
43	(Japan) Azuma	11
38	(Germany) Sauer	15
6	(Italy) Batini	10

Round of 16
3	(France) Thibus	15
51	(South Korea) Hong	10
11	(South Korea) Jeon	10
38	(Germany) Sauer	11

Quarterfinals
3	(France) Thibus	15
38	(Germany) Sauer	8

==== Section 4 ====
Round of 64
7	(Italy) Volpi	15
58	(South Korea) Kim	7
39	(Poland) Jelińska	10
26	(Hungary) Mohamed	14
23	(China) Huo	15
42	(China) Liu	13
55	(Australia) Clarke	4
10	(Tunisia) Boubakri	15
15	(Russia) Zagidullina	15
50	(Germany) Ebert	8
47	(Austria) Wohlgemuth	14
18	(Poland) Walczyk	15
31	(Canada) Ryan	14
34	(Romania) Călugăreanu	9
63	(Indonesia) Puh	2
2	(United States) Kiefer	15

Round of 32
7	(Italy) Volpi	15
26	(Hungary) Mohamed	11
23	(China) Huo	7
10	(Tunisia) Boubakri	15
15	(Russia) Zagidullina	13
18	(Poland) Walczyk	14
31	(Canada) Ryan	9
2	(United States) Kiefer	15

Round of 16
7	(Italy) Volpi	15
10	(Tunisia) Boubakri	13
18	(Poland) Walczyk	15
2	(United States) Kiefer	12

Quarterfinals
7	(Italy) Volpi	15
18	(Poland) Walczyk	9
