= Women's foil at the 2019 World Fencing Championships =

- Venue: SYMA Sports and Conference Centre
- Location: Budapest, Hungary
- Dates: 16–19 July

Medalists
gold medal	Inna Deriglazova	Russia
silver medal	Pauline Ranvier	France
bronze medal	Arianna Errigo	Italy
bronze medal	Elisa Di Francisca	Italy

The Women's foil competition at the 2019 World Fencing Championships was held on 19 July 2019. The qualification was held on 16 July.

== Draw ==
=== Finals ===
Semifinals
(France) Pauline Ranvier	15
(Italy) Arianna Errigo	13
(Italy) Elisa Di Francisca	13
(Russia) Inna Deriglazova	15

Final
(France) Pauline Ranvier	11
(Russia) Inna Deriglazova	15

=== Top half ===
==== Section 1 ====
Round of 64
(Italy) Alice Volpi	15
(Colombia) Juliana Pineda	1
(Singapore) Amita Berthier	14
(Spain) María Díaz	15
(Japan) Sumire Tsuji	9
(Ukraine) Kateryna Chentsova	15
(South Korea) Hong Seo-in	9
(Japan) Yuka Ueno	10
(Russia) Anastasiia Ivanova	13
(Venezuela) Anabella Acurero	7
(Hungary) Fanny Kreiss	15
(Mexico) Alely Hernández	5
(France) Pauline Ranvier	15
(Vietnam) Đỗ Thị Anh	6
(China) Chen Qingyuan	15
(Tunisia) Inès Boubakri	14

Round of 32
(Italy) Alice Volpi	13
(Spain) María Díaz	15
(Ukraine) Kateryna Chentsova	6
(Japan) Yuka Ueno	15
(Russia) Anastasiia Ivanova	10
(Hungary) Fanny Kreiss	14
(France) Pauline Ranvier	15
(China) Chen Qingyuan	13

Round of 16
(Spain) María Díaz	9
(Japan) Yuka Ueno	15
(Hungary) Fanny Kreiss	13
(France) Pauline Ranvier	15

Quarterfinals
(Japan) Yuka Ueno	11
(France) Pauline Ranvier	15

==== Section 2 ====
Round of 64
(United States) Lee Kiefer	15
(Ukraine) Alexandra Senyuta	7
(France) Anita Blaze	11
(Israel) Nicole Pustilnik	15
(Germany) Anne Sauer	13
(South Korea) Chae Song-oh	10
(Hong Kong) Sophia Wu	8
(Russia) Larisa Korobeynikova	15
(Italy) Francesca Palumbo	15
(Turkey) İrem Karamete	14
(Colombia) Saskia Loretta van Erven Garcia	15
(Netherlands) Eline Rentier	10
(Hungary) Kata Kondricz	15
(Uzbekistan) Yana Alborova	8
(Slovakia) Kitti Bitterová	2
(Italy) Arianna Errigo	15

Round of 32
(United States) Lee Kiefer	15
(Israel) Nicole Pustilnik	11
(Germany) Anne Sauer	15
(Russia) Larisa Korobeynikova	10
(Italy) Francesca Palumbo	15
(Colombia) Saskia Loretta van Erven Garcia	4
(Hungary) Kata Kondricz	11
(Italy) Arianna Errigo	15

Round of 16
(United States) Lee Kiefer	15
(Germany) Anne Sauer	5
(Italy) Francesca Palumbo	7
(Italy) Arianna Errigo	15

Quarterfinals
(United States) Lee Kiefer	13
(Italy) Arianna Errigo	15

=== Bottom half ===
==== Section 3 ====
Round of 64
(France) Ysaora Thibus	15
(Mexico) Melissa Rebolledo	8
(Poland) Hanna Łyczbińska	14
(United States) Jacqueline Dubrovich	13
(Canada) Eleanor Harvey	5
(China) Huo Xingxin	6
(Mexico) Nataly Michel	6
(United States) Nicole Ross	15
(Japan) Sera Azuma	15
(Brazil) Bia Bulcão	10
(Poland) Julia Walczyk	15
(Japan) Komaki Kikuchi	8
(China) Fu Yiting	7
(Canada) Kelleigh Ryan	6
(Ukraine) Anna Taranenko	4
(Italy) Elisa Di Francisca	15

Round of 32
(France) Ysaora Thibus	15
(Poland) Hanna Łyczbińska	5
(China) Huo Xingxin	15
(United States) Nicole Ross	10
(Japan) Sera Azuma	15
(Poland) Julia Walczyk	13
(China) Fu Yiting	6
(Italy) Elisa Di Francisca	15

Round of 16
(France) Ysaora Thibus	12
(China) Huo Xingxin	13
(Japan) Sera Azuma	11
(Italy) Elisa Di Francisca	15

Quarterfinals
(China) Huo Xingxin	8
(Italy) Elisa Di Francisca	15

==== Section 4 ====
Round of 64
(Germany) Leonie Ebert	15
(France) Solène Butruille	12
(Hungary) Aida Mohamed	15
(United Kingdom) Kate Beardmore	12
(Russia) Adelina Zagidullina	15
(China) Shi Yue	13
(Hungary) Dóra Lupkovics	13
(South Korea) Jeon Hee-sook	15
(United States) Nzingha Prescod	15
(Hong Kong) Valerie Cheng	11
(Egypt) Yara El-Sharkawy	7
(Canada) Jessica Guo	15
(South Korea) Hong Hyo-jin	15
(Chile) Arantza Inostroza	11
(Romania) Maria Boldor	4
(Russia) Inna Deriglazova	15

Round of 32
(Germany) Leonie Ebert	15
(Hungary) Aida Mohamed	3
(Russia) Adelina Zagidullina	15
(South Korea) Jeon Hee-sook	11
(United States) Nzingha Prescod	12
(Canada) Jessica Guo	15
(South Korea) Hong Hyo-jin	9
(Russia) Inna Deriglazova	15

Round of 16
(Germany) Leonie Ebert	13
(Russia) Adelina Zagidullina	15
(Canada) Jessica Guo	8
(Russia) Inna Deriglazova	15

Quarterfinals
(Russia) Adelina Zagidullina	3
(Russia) Inna Deriglazova	15
