= Women's foil at the 2018 World Fencing Championships =

- Venue: Wuxi Sports Center Indoor Stadium
- Location: Wuxi, China
- Dates: 20 July (qualification); 23 July
- Competitors: 108 from 44 nations

Medalists
gold medal	Alice Volpi	Italy
silver medal	Ysaora Thibus	France
bronze medal	Arianna Errigo	Italy
bronze medal	Inès Boubakri	Tunisia

The Women's foil event of the 2018 World Fencing Championships was held on 23 July 2018. The qualification was held on 20 July 2018.

== Draw ==
=== Finals ===
Semifinals
(France) Ysaora Thibus	15
(Italy) Arianna Errigo	2
(Tunisia) Inès Boubakri	7
(Italy) Alice Volpi	15

Final
(France) Ysaora Thibus	12
(Italy) Alice Volpi	15

=== Top half ===
==== Section 1 ====
Round of 64
(Russia) Inna Deriglazova	15
(United Kingdom) Kate Beardmore	2
(Poland) Martyna Jelińska	15
(Brazil) Gabriela Cecchini	14
(Japan) Komaki Kikuchi	15
(Ukraine) Anastasiya Moskovska	7
(Hungary) Aida Mohamed	9
(United States) Nicole Ross	15
(Russia) Svetlana Tripapina	15
(South Korea) Hong Hyo-jin	12
(France) Anita Blaze	12
(China) Fu Yiting	15
(Hungary) Fanny Kreiss	15
(China) Shi Yue	14
(Argentina) Flavia Mormandi	4
(France) Ysaora Thibus	15

Round of 32
(Russia) Inna Deriglazova	15
(Poland) Martyna Jelińska	5
(Japan) Komaki Kikuchi	5
(United States) Nicole Ross	15
(Russia) Svetlana Tripapina	15
(China) Fu Yiting	11
(Hungary) Fanny Kreiss	8
(France) Ysaora Thibus	15

Round of 16
(Russia) Inna Deriglazova	15
(United States) Nicole Ross	7
(Russia) Svetlana Tripapina	9
(France) Ysaora Thibus	15

Quarterfinals
(Russia) Inna Deriglazova	14
(France) Ysaora Thibus	15

==== Section 2 ====
Round of 64
(Germany) Anne Sauer	8
(United States) Nzingha Prescod	15
(China) Huo Xingxin	10
(South Korea) Hong Seo-in	15
(Japan) Sera Azuma	15
(Spain) María Marino	9
(Germany) Eva Hampel	15
(South Korea) Jeon Hee-sook	8
(Germany) Leonie Ebert	15
(Venezuela) Isis Giménez	5
(Australia) Emily Marotta	13
(Russia) Marta Martyanova	15
(Austria) Olivia Wohlgemuth	15
(Chinese Taipei) Cheng Hsin	6
(Canada) Naomi Moindrot-Zilliox	5
(Italy) Arianna Errigo	15

Round of 32
(United States) Nzingha Prescod	15
(South Korea) Hong Seo-in	9
(Japan) Sera Azuma	12
(Germany) Eva Hampel	15
(Germany) Leonie Ebert	7
(Russia) Marta Martyanova	6
(Austria) Olivia Wohlgemuth	8
(Italy) Arianna Errigo	15

Round of 16
(United States) Nzingha Prescod	15
(Germany) Eva Hampel	7
(Germany) Leonie Ebert	5
(Italy) Arianna Errigo	15

Quarterfinals
(United States) Nzingha Prescod	11
(Italy) Arianna Errigo	15

=== Bottom half ===
==== Section 3 ====
Round of 64
(United States) Lee Kiefer	15
(Hungary) Kata Kondricz	9
(Canada) Alanna Goldie	15
(Chile) Arantza Inostroza	11
(United States) Margaret Lu	6
(Poland) Hanna Łyczbińska	8
(Colombia) Saskia Loretta van Erven Garcia	4
(Poland) Julia Walczyk	15
(South Korea) Nam Hyun-hee	15
(Egypt) Yara El-Sharkawy	3
(France) Astrid Guyart	13
(Poland) Martyna Synoradzka	12
(Japan) Yuka Ueno	15
(Sweden) Ester Schreiber	8
(France) Pauline Ranvier	14
(Tunisia) Inès Boubakri	15

Round of 32
(United States) Lee Kiefer	15
(Canada) Alanna Goldie	8
(Poland) Hanna Łyczbińska	15
(Poland) Julia Walczyk	10
(South Korea) Nam Hyun-hee	6
(France) Astrid Guyart	15
(Japan) Yuka Ueno	13
(Tunisia) Inès Boubakri	15

Round of 16
(United States) Lee Kiefer	15
(Poland) Hanna Łyczbińska	9
(France) Astrid Guyart	14
(Tunisia) Inès Boubakri	15

Quarterfinals
(United States) Lee Kiefer	13
(Tunisia) Inès Boubakri	15

==== Section 4 ====
Round of 64
(Canada) Eleanor Harvey	15
(Australia) Freya Clarke	4
(Turkey) İrem Karamete	15
(China) Chen Qingyuan	11
(Hong Kong) Kimberley Cheung	8
(Italy) Chiara Cini	15
(Ukraine) Anna Taranenko	5
(Italy) Camilla Mancini	15
(Japan) Karin Miyawaki	10
(Ukraine) Kateryna Chentsova	15
(Spain) María Teresa Díaz	14
(Ukraine) Alexandra Senyuta	15
(Russia) Adelina Zagidullina	15
(Canada) Kelleigh Ryan	12
(Philippines) Samantha Catantan	4
(Italy) Alice Volpi	15

Round of 32
(Canada) Eleanor Harvey	15
(Turkey) İrem Karamete	3
(Italy) Chiara Cini	9
(Italy) Camilla Mancini	15
(Ukraine) Kateryna Chentsova	15
(Ukraine) Alexandra Senyuta	14
(Russia) Adelina Zagidullina	6
(Italy) Alice Volpi	15

Round of 16
(Canada) Eleanor Harvey	10
(Italy) Camilla Mancini	15
(Ukraine) Kateryna Chentsova	2
(Italy) Alice Volpi	15

Quarterfinals
(Italy) Camilla Mancini	9
(Italy) Alice Volpi	15
