= Fencing at the 2017 Summer Universiade – Women's individual foil =

Women's individual foil at the XXIX Summer Universiade
- Venues: Taipei Nangang Exhibition Center
- Dates: 21 August 2017
- Competitors: 65 from 27 nations

Medalists
| 1st place, gold medalist(s) | | Fanny Kreiss | Hungary |
| 2nd place, silver medalist(s) | | Yana Alborova | Russia |
| 3rd place, bronze medalist(s) | | Adelya Abdrakhmanova | Russia |
| 3rd place, bronze medalist(s) | | Beatrice Monaco | Italy |

The women's individual foil fencing event at the 2017 Summer Universiade was held 21 August at the Taipei Nangang Exhibition Center in Taipei, Taiwan.

== Pool Results ==
| Qualified for Ranking Round |

=== Pool 1 ===
| # | Seed | Athlete | 1 | 2 | 3 | 4 | 5 | 6 | 7 | V# | M# | Ind. | TG | TR | Diff. | RP | RT |
|---|---|---|---|---|---|---|---|---|---|---|---|---|---|---|---|---|---|
| 1 | 1 | Julia Walczyk (POL) | | V | V | V | V | V | V | 6 | 6 | 1.000 | 30 | 10 | 20 | 1 | 1 |
| 2 | 20 | Chloe Jubenot (FRA) | D_{4} | | D_{3} | V | V | V | V | 4 | 6 | 0.667 | 27 | 16 | 11 | 3 | 19 |
| 3 | 22 | Gabriela Cecchini (BRA) | D_{1} | V | | V | V | V | V | 5 | 6 | 0.833 | 26 | 15 | 11 | 2 | 7 |
| 4 | 40 | Bindu Devi Sagolsem (IND) | D_{1} | D_{2} | D_{2} | | V | V | D_{2} | 2 | 6 | 0.333 | 17 | 22 | –5 | 5 | 48 |
| 5 | 42 | Stephanie Wyllie (NZL) | D_{0} | D_{0} | D_{0} | D_{2} | | D_{3} | D_{0} | 0 | 6 | 0.000 | 5 | 30 | –25 | 7 | 65 |
| 6 | 61 | Dana Kakenova (KAZ) | D_{2} | D_{1} | D_{2} | D_{0} | V | | D_{1} | 1 | 6 | 0.167 | 11 | 28 | –17 | 6 | 55 |
| 7 | 62 | Erin Dietsche (USA) | D_{2} | D_{3} | D_{3} | V | V | V | | 3 | 6 | 0.500 | 23 | 18 | 5 | 4 | 34 |

=== Pool 2 ===
| # | Seed | Athlete | 1 | 2 | 3 | 4 | 5 | 6 | 7 | V# | M# | Ind. | TG | TR | Diff. | RP | RT |
|---|---|---|---|---|---|---|---|---|---|---|---|---|---|---|---|---|---|
| 1 | 2 | Minami Kano (JPN) | | D_{2} | V | V | V | V | V | 5 | 6 | 0.833 | 27 | 15 | 12 | 2 | 5 |
| 2 | 19 | Mălina Călugăreanu (ROU) | V | | V | V | V_{4} | V | V | 6 | 6 | 1.000 | 29 | 13 | 16 | 1 | 2 |
| 3 | 21 | Solene Butruille (FRA) | D_{1} | D_{4} | | D_{3} | V | V | V | 3 | 6 | 0.500 | 23 | 17 | 6 | 3 | 33 |
| 4 | 39 | Ho Peng I (MAC) | D_{2} | D_{1} | V | | D_{3} | V | V | 3 | 6 | 0.500 | 21 | 21 | 0 | 5 | 37 |
| 5 | 41 | Prakash Awati (IND) | D_{4} | D_{3} | D_{0} | V | | V | V | 3 | 6 | 0.500 | 22 | 18 | 4 | 4 | 36 |
| 6 | 59 | Andrea Campos Esquivel (CRC) | D_{3} | D_{3} | D_{0} | D_{1} | D_{1} | | V | 1 | 6 | 0.167 | 13 | 27 | –14 | 6 | 54 |
| 7 | 63 | Mandira Thapa (NEP) | D_{0} | D_{0} | D_{2} | D_{2} | D_{0} | D_{2} | | 0 | 6 | 0.000 | 6 | 30 | –24 | 7 | 64 |

=== Pool 3 ===
| # | Seed | Athlete | 1 | 2 | 3 | 4 | 5 | 6 | 7 | V# | M# | Ind. | TG | TR | Diff. | RP | RT |
|---|---|---|---|---|---|---|---|---|---|---|---|---|---|---|---|---|---|
| 1 | 3 | Fanny Kreiss (HUN) | | V | D_{3} | V | V | V | D_{3} | 4 | 6 | 0.667 | 26 | 20 | 6 | 3 | 22 |
| 2 | 18 | Adelya Abdrakhmanova (RUS) | D_{1} | | V | V | V | V | V | 5 | 6 | 0.833 | 26 | 12 | 14 | 1 | 4 |
| 3 | 23 | Eline Rentier (NED) | V | D_{4} | | V | D_{4} | V | D_{4} | 3 | 6 | 0.500 | 27 | 18 | 9 | 5 | 31 |
| 4 | 38 | Yang Chin-man (TPE) | D_{2} | D_{1} | D_{0} | | D_{2} | D_{2} | D_{4} | 0 | 6 | 0.000 | 11 | 30 | –19 | 7 | 60 |
| 5 | 43 | Rio Azuma (JPN) | D_{4} | D_{2} | V | V | | V | V | 4 | 6 | 0.667 | 26 | 17 | 9 | 2 | 20 |
| 6 | 58 | Amalia Tătăran (ROU) | D_{3} | D_{0} | D_{0} | V | D_{1} | | D_{1} | 1 | 6 | 0.167 | 10 | 27 | –17 | 6 | 56 |
| 7 | 64 | Lee Se-joo (KOR) | V | D_{0} | V | V | D_{0} | V | | 4 | 6 | 0.667 | 20 | 22 | –2 | 4 | 23 |

=== Pool 4 ===
| # | Seed | Athlete | 1 | 2 | 3 | 4 | 5 | 6 | 7 | V# | M# | Ind. | TG | TR | Diff. | RP | RT |
|---|---|---|---|---|---|---|---|---|---|---|---|---|---|---|---|---|---|
| 1 | 4 | Hanna Łyczbińska (POL) | | V_{4} | D_{3} | V | V | V | V | 5 | 6 | 0.833 | 27 | 16 | 11 | 1 | 6 |
| 2 | 17 | Olga Rachele Calissi (ITA) | D_{2} | | D_{4} | V | D_{4} | V | V | 3 | 6 | 0.500 | 25 | 17 | 8 | 4 | 32 |
| 3 | 25 | Karin Miyawaki (JPN) | V | V | | V | V | D_{2} | V | 5 | 6 | 0.833 | 27 | 18 | 9 | 2 | 9 |
| 4 | 37 | Victoria Maria Isabel Meza Oceguera (MEX) | D_{1} | D_{2} | D_{2} | | D_{0} | D_{0} | V | 1 | 6 | 0.167 | 10 | 28 | –18 | 6 | 57 |
| 5 | 44 | Xu Mengxu (CHN) | D_{4} | V | D_{3} | V | | D_{3} | V | 3 | 6 | 0.500 | 25 | 21 | 4 | 5 | 35 |
| 6 | 57 | Ko Chae-yeong (KOR) | D_{4} | D_{1} | V | V | V | | V | 4 | 6 | 0.667 | 25 | 16 | 9 | 3 | 21 |
| 7 | 60 | Kajal Kajal (IND) | D_{0} | D_{0} | D_{1} | D_{3} | D_{2} | D_{1} | | 0 | 6 | 0.000 | 7 | 30 | –23 | 7 | 63 |

=== Pool 5 ===
| # | Seed | Athlete | 1 | 2 | 3 | 4 | 5 | 6 | 7 | V# | M# | Ind. | TG | TR | Diff. | RP | RT |
|---|---|---|---|---|---|---|---|---|---|---|---|---|---|---|---|---|---|
| 1 | 5 | Beatrice Monaco (ITA) | | V | V | V | V | D_{2} | V | 5 | 6 | 0.833 | 27 | 20 | 7 | 2 | 10 |
| 2 | 16 | Yana Alborova (RUS) | D_{4} | | V | V | V | V | V | 5 | 6 | 0.833 | 29 | 20 | 9 | 1 | 8 |
| 3 | 24 | Julia Chrzanowska (POL) | D_{2} | D_{2} | | V | V | V | D_{1} | 3 | 6 | 0.500 | 20 | 23 | –3 | 4 | 39 |
| 4 | 36 | Michala Cellerová (SVK) | D_{2} | D_{1} | D_{1} | | V | V | V | 3 | 6 | 0.500 | 19 | 19 | 0 | 3 | 38 |
| 5 | 45 | Li Xin (CHN) | D_{4} | D_{4} | D_{4} | D_{0} | | D_{2} | V | 1 | 6 | 0.167 | 19 | 25 | –6 | 7 | 53 |
| 6 | 56 | Song A-young (KOR) | V | D_{4} | D_{3} | D_{4} | V | | D_{3} | 2 | 6 | 0.333 | 24 | 24 | 0 | 5 | 47 |
| 7 | 65 | Giselle Vicatos (RSA) | D_{3} | D_{4} | V | D_{0} | D_{0} | V | | 2 | 6 | 0.333 | 17 | 24 | –7 | 6 | 49 |

=== Pool 6 ===
| # | Seed | Athlete | 1 | 2 | 3 | 4 | 5 | 6 | V# | M# | Ind. | TG | TR | Diff. | RP | RT |
|---|---|---|---|---|---|---|---|---|---|---|---|---|---|---|---|---|
| 1 | 6 | Martyna Jelińska (POL) | | V | V | V | V | V | 5 | 5 | 1.000 | 25 | 14 | 11 | 1 | 3 |
| 2 | 15 | Maria Boldor (ROU) | D_{1} | | V | V | V | V | 4 | 5 | 0.800 | 21 | 11 | 10 | 2 | 15 |
| 3 | 26 | Lau Cheuk Yu (HKG) | D_{2} | D_{1} | | D_{2} | V | V | 2 | 5 | 0.400 | 15 | 17 | –2 | 3 | 43 |
| 4 | 35 | Tsai Xiao-qing (TPE) | D_{4} | D_{1} | V_{3} | | V | D_{4} | 2 | 5 | 0.400 | 17 | 21 | –4 | 4 | 44 |
| 5 | 46 | Orsolya Balogh (HUN) | D_{3} | D_{1} | D_{3} | D_{4} | | V | 1 | 5 | 0.200 | 16 | 23 | –7 | 5 | 50 |
| 6 | 55 | Kang Xinxin (CHN) | D_{4} | D_{3} | D_{1} | V | D_{3} | | 1 | 5 | 0.200 | 16 | 24 | –8 | 6 | 51 |

=== Pool 7 ===
| # | Seed | Athlete | 1 | 2 | 3 | 4 | 5 | 6 | V# | M# | Ind. | TG | TR | Diff. | RP | RT |
|---|---|---|---|---|---|---|---|---|---|---|---|---|---|---|---|---|
| 1 | 7 | Leyla Pirieva (RUS) | | D_{2} | V | D_{1} | V | V | 3 | 5 | 0.600 | 18 | 14 | 4 | 2 | 25 |
| 2 | 14 | Cheung Kimberley Vanessa (HKG) | V | | D_{2} | V | V | V | 4 | 5 | 0.800 | 22 | 14 | 8 | 1 | 16 |
| 3 | 27 | Lucia Ondarts (ARG) | D_{3} | V | | V | D_{4} | V | 3 | 5 | 0.600 | 22 | 19 | 3 | 3 | 26 |
| 4 | 34 | Melissa Rebolledo (MEX) | V | D_{2} | D_{3} | | V | V | 3 | 5 | 0.600 | 20 | 18 | 2 | 4 | 27 |
| 5 | 47 | Kitti Bitterova (SVK) | D_{1} | D_{3} | V | D_{4} | | V | 2 | 5 | 0.400 | 18 | 23 | –5 | 5 | 45 |
| 6 | 54 | Georgina Barratt (AUS) | D_{0} | D_{2} | D_{4} | D_{3} | D_{4} | | 0 | 5 | 0.000 | 13 | 25 | –12 | 6 | 58 |

=== Pool 8 ===
| # | Seed | Athlete | 1 | 2 | 3 | 4 | 5 | 6 | V# | M# | Ind. | TG | TR | Diff. | RP | RT |
|---|---|---|---|---|---|---|---|---|---|---|---|---|---|---|---|---|
| 1 | 8 | Francesca Palumbo (ITA) | | V | D_{4} | D_{3} | V | V | 3 | 5 | 0.600 | 22 | 17 | 5 | 3 | 24 |
| 2 | 13 | Kata Kondricz (HUN) | D_{1} | | V | V | V | V | 4 | 5 | 0.800 | 21 | 10 | 11 | 1 | 14 |
| 3 | 28 | Maeva Rancurel (FRA) | V | D_{2} | | D_{4} | V | V | 3 | 5 | 0.600 | 21 | 21 | 0 | 4 | 29 |
| 4 | 33 | Freya Cenker (AUT) | V | D_{2} | V | | V | V | 4 | 5 | 0.800 | 22 | 14 | 8 | 2 | 16 |
| 5 | 49 | Ho Ka U (MAC) | D_{2} | D_{0} | D_{3} | D_{2} | | D_{4} | 0 | 5 | 0.000 | 11 | 25 | –14 | 6 | 59 |
| 6 | 53 | Victoria Mentor (AUS) | D_{4} | D_{1} | D_{4} | D_{0} | V | | 1 | 5 | 0.200 | 14 | 24 | –10 | 5 | 52 |

=== Pool 9 ===
| # | Seed | Athlete | 1 | 2 | 3 | 4 | 5 | 6 | V# | M# | Ind. | TG | TR | Diff. | RP | RT |
|---|---|---|---|---|---|---|---|---|---|---|---|---|---|---|---|---|
| 1 | 9 | Valentina De Costanzo (ITA) | | V | V | D_{2} | V | V | 4 | 5 | 0.800 | 22 | 17 | 5 | 2 | 18 |
| 2 | 12 | Lupkovics Dóra (HUN) | D_{4} | | V | V | V | V | 4 | 5 | 0.800 | 24 | 10 | 14 | 1 | 13 |
| 3 | 29 | Hong Hyo-jin (KOR) | D_{3} | D_{1} | | D_{4} | V | V | 2 | 5 | 0.400 | 18 | 19 | –1 | 5 | 41 |
| 4 | 32 | Irina Elesina (RUS) | V | D_{2} | V | | V | D_{1} | 3 | 5 | 0.600 | 18 | 16 | 2 | 3 | 28 |
| 5 | 49 | Huang Liya (MAC) | D_{1} | D_{1} | D_{1} | D_{0} | | D_{1} | 0 | 5 | 0.000 | 4 | 25 | –21 | 6 | 61 |
| 6 | 52 | Chen Ling-yi (TPE) | D_{4} | D_{1} | D_{3} | V | V | | 2 | 5 | 0.400 | 18 | 17 | 1 | 4 | 40 |

=== Pool 10 ===
| # | Seed | Athlete | 1 | 2 | 3 | 4 | 5 | 6 | V# | M# | Ind. | TG | TR | Diff. | RP | RT |
|---|---|---|---|---|---|---|---|---|---|---|---|---|---|---|---|---|
| 1 | 10 | Alely Hernández (MEX) | | V | D_{3} | V | V | V | 4 | 5 | 0.800 | 23 | 8 | 15 | 1 | 11 |
| 2 | 11 | Olivia Wohlgemuth (AUT) | D_{2} | | V | V | V | V | 4 | 5 | 0.800 | 22 | 7 | 15 | 2 | 12 |
| 3 | 30 | Rozène Castanié (FRA) | V | D_{0} | | V | V | D_{3} | 3 | 5 | 0.600 | 18 | 18 | 0 | 3 | 30 |
| 4 | 31 | Cheng Hsin (TPE) | D_{0} | D_{2} | D_{4} | | V | V | 2 | 5 | 0.400 | 16 | 18 | –2 | 4 | 42 |
| 5 | 50 | Sharayu Patil (IND) | D_{0} | D_{0} | D_{1} | D_{1} | | D_{1} | 0 | 5 | 0.000 | 3 | 25 | –22 | 6 | 62 |
| 6 | 51 | Angela Li (CAN) | D_{1} | D_{0} | V | D_{2} | V | | 2 | 5 | 0.400 | 13 | 19 | –6 | 5 | 48 |

== Ranking Round ==
=== Section 1 ===
Round of 64
21 | Solene Butruille (FRA) | 10
17 | Olga Rachele Calissi (ITA) | 15
14 | Cheung Kimberley Vanessa (HKG) | 15
40 | Bindu Devi Sagolsem (IND) | 9
65 | Giselle Vicatos (RSA) | 8
33 | Freya Cenker (AUT) | 15
29 | Hong Hyo-jin (KOR) | 13
8 | Francesca Palumbo (ITA) | 15
7 | Leyla Pirieva (RUS) | 15
52 | Chen Ling-yi (TPE) | 6

Round of 32
1 | Julia Walczyk (POL) | 11
17 | Olga Rachele Calissi (ITA) | 15
14 | Cheung Kimberley Vanessa (HKG) | 15
33 | Freya Cenker (AUT) | 8
25 | Karin Miyawaki (JPN) | 15
8 | Francesca Palumbo (ITA) | 9
7 | Leyla Pirieva (RUS) | 13
16 | Yana Alborova (RUS) | 15

Round of 16
17 | Olga Rachele Calissi (ITA) | 10
14 | Cheung Kimberley Vanessa (HKG) | 15
25 | Karin Miyawaki (JPN) | 12
16 | Yana Alborova (RUS) | 15

Quarterfinal
14 | Cheung Kimberley Vanessa (HKG) | 9
16 | Yana Alborova (RUS) | 15

=== Section 2 ===
Round of 64
39 | Ho Peng I (MAC) | 6
32 | Irina Elesina (RUS) | 15
57 | Ko Chae-yeong (KOR) | 15
35 | Tsai Xiao-qing (TPE) | 13
47 | Kitti Bitterova (SVK) | 15
43 | Rio Azuma (JPN) | 6
28 | Maeva Rancurel (FRA) | 15
41 | Prakash Awati (IND) | 4

Round of 32
2 | Minami Kano (JPN) | 12
32 | Irina Elesina (RUS) | 15
57 | Ko Chae-yeong (KOR) | 13
11 | Olivia Wohlgemuth (AUT) | 15
12 | Lupkovics Dóra (HUN) | 15
47 | Kitti Bitterova (SVK) | 8
28 | Maeva Rancurel (FRA) | 12
18 | Adelya Abdrakhmanova (RUS) | 15

Round of 16
32 | Irina Elesina (RUS) | 15
11 | Olivia Wohlgemuth (AUT) | 5
12 | Lupkovics Dóra (HUN) | 10
18 | Adelya Abdrakhmanova (RUS) | 15

Quarterfinal
32 | Irina Elesina (RUS) | 6
18 | Adelya Abdrakhmanova (RUS) | 15

=== Section 3 ===
Round of 64
44 | Xu Mengxu (CHN) | 15
30 | Rozène Castanié (FRA) | 4
20 | Chloe Jubenot (FRA) | 15
51 | Angela Li (CAN) | 5
26 | Lau Cheuk Yu (HKG) | 5
3 | Fanny Kreiss (HUN) | 15
34 | Melissa Rebolledo (MEX) | 14
36 | Michala Cellerová (SVK) | 15

Round of 32
6 | Martyna Jelińska (POL) | 8
44 | Xu Mengxu (CHN) | 15
20 | Chloe Jubenot (FRA) | 15
13 | Kata Kondricz (HUN) | 14
10 | Alely Hernández (MEX) | 10
3 | Fanny Kreiss (HUN) | 15
36 | Michala Cellerová (SVK) | 3
4 | Hanna Łyczbińska (POL) | 15

Round of 16
44 | Xu Mengxu (CHN) | 13
20 | Chloe Jubenot (FRA) | 15
3 | Fanny Kreiss (HUN) | 15
4 | Hanna Łyczbińska (POL) | 9

Quarterfinal
20 | Chloe Jubenot (FRA) | 14
3 | Fanny Kreiss (HUN) | 15

=== Section 4 ===
Round of 64
24 | Julia Chrzanowska (POL) | 15
27 | Lucia Ondarts (ARG) | 7
64 | Lee Se-joo (KOR) | 7
31 | Cheng Hsin (TPE) | 15
56 | Song A-young (KOR) | 7
9 | Valentina De Costanzo (ITA) | 15
23 | Eline Rentier (NED) | 15
62 | Erin Dietsche (USA) | 13

Round of 32
22 | Gabriela Cecchini (BRA) | 11
24 | Julia Chrzanowska (POL) | 15
31 | Cheng Hsin (TPE) | 7
5 | Beatrice Monaco (ITA) | 15
15 | Maria Boldor (ROU) | 15
9 | Valentina De Costanzo (ITA) | 14
23 | Eline Rentier (NED) | 11
19 | Mălina Călugăreanu (ROU) | 15

Round of 16
24 | Julia Chrzanowska (POL) | 7
5 | Beatrice Monaco (ITA) | 15
15 | Maria Boldor (ROU) | 14
19 | Mălina Călugăreanu (ROU) | 15

Quarterfinal
5 | Beatrice Monaco (ITA) | 15
19 | Mălina Călugăreanu (ROU) | 11

=== Quarterfinals ===
Quarterfinals
14 | Cheung Kimberley Vanessa (HKG) | 9
16 | Yana Alborova (RUS) | 15
32 | Irina Elesina (RUS) | 6
18 | Adelya Abdrakhmanova (RUS) | 15
20 | Chloe Jubenot (FRA) | 14
3 | Fanny Kreiss (HUN) | 15
5 | Beatrice Monaco (ITA) | 15
19 | Mălina Călugăreanu (ROU) | 11

Semifinals
16 | Yana Alborova (RUS) | 15
18 | Adelya Abdrakhmanova (RUS) | 13
3 | Fanny Kreiss (HUN) | 15
5 | Beatrice Monaco (ITA) | 10

Final
16 | Yana Alborova (RUS) | 7
3 | Fanny Kreiss (HUN) | 15

== Final ranking ==
| Rank | Athlete | Results |
|---|---|---|
| 1st place, gold medalist(s) | Fanny Kreiss (HUN) | Champion |
| 2nd place, silver medalist(s) | Yana Alborova (RUS) | Runner-up |
| 3rd place, bronze medalist(s) | Adelya Abdrakhmanova (RUS) | Semifinals |
| 3rd place, bronze medalist(s) | Beatrice Monaco (ITA) | Semifinals |
| 5 | Mălina Călugăreanu (ROU) | Quarterfinals |
| 6 | Cheung Kimberley Vanessa (HKG) | Quarterfinals |
| 7 | Chloe Jubenot (FRA) | Quarterfinals |
| 8 | Irina Elesina (RUS) | Quarterfinals |
| 9 | Hanna Łyczbińska (POL) | Round of 16 |
| 10 | Karin Miyawaki (JPN) | Round of 16 |
| 11 | Olivia Wohlgemuth (AUT) | Round of 16 |
| 12 | Lupkovics Dóra (HUN) | Round of 16 |
| 13 | Maria Boldor (ROU) | Round of 16 |
| 14 | Olga Rachele Calissi (ITA) | Round of 16 |
| 15 | Xu Mengxu (CHN) | Round of 16 |
| 16 | Julia Chrzanowska (POL) | Round of 16 |
| 17 | Julia Walczyk (POL) | Round of 32 |
| 18 | Martyna Jelińska (POL) | Round of 32 |
| 19 | Minami Kano (JPN) | Round of 32 |
| 20 | Gabriela Cecchini (BRA) | Round of 32 |
| 21 | Alely Hernández (MEX) | Round of 32 |
| 22 | Kata Kondricz (HUN) | Round of 32 |
| 23 | Freya Cenker (AUT) | Round of 32 |
| 24 | Valentina De Costanzo (ITA) | Round of 32 |
| 25 | Ko Chae-yeong (KOR) | Round of 32 |
| 26 | Francesca Palumbo (ITA) | Round of 32 |
| 27 | Leyla Pirieva (RUS) | Round of 32 |
| 28 | Maeva Rancurel (FRA) | Round of 32 |
| 29 | Eline Rentier (NED) | Round of 32 |
| 30 | Michala Cellerová (SVK) | Round of 32 |
| 31 | Cheng Hsin (TPE) | Round of 32 |
| 32 | Kitti Bitterova (SVK) | Round of 32 |
| 33 | Rio Azuma (JPN) | Round of 64 |
| 34 | Lee Se-joo (KOR) | Round of 64 |
| 35 | Lucia Ondarts (ARG) | Round of 64 |
| 36 | Melissa Rebolledo (MEX) | Round of 64 |
| 37 | Rozène Castanié (FRA) | Round of 64 |
| 38 | Solene Butruille (FRA) | Round of 64 |
| 39 | Erin Dietsche (USA) | Round of 64 |
| 40 | Prakash Awati (IND) | Round of 64 |
| 41 | Ho Peng IHo Peng I (MAC) | Round of 64 |
| 42 | Chen Ling-yi (TPE) | Round of 64 |
| 43 | Hong Hyo-jin (KOR) | Round of 64 |
| 44 | Lau Cheuk Yu (HKG) | Round of 64 |
| 45 | Tsai Xiao-qing (TPE) | Round of 64 |
| 46 | Angela Li (CAN) | Round of 64 |
| 47 | Song A-young (KOR) | Round of 64 |
| 48 | Bindu Devi Sagolsem (IND) | Round of 64 |
| 49 | Giselle Vicatos (RSA) | Round of 64 |
| 50 | Orsolya Balogh (HUN) | Round of Pools |
| 51 | Kang Xinxin (CHN) | Round of Pools |
| 52 | Victoria Mentor (AUS) | Round of Pools |
| 53 | Li Xin (CHN) | Round of Pools |
| 54 | Andrea Campos Esquivel (CRC) | Round of Pools |
| 55 | Dana Kakenova (KAZ) | Round of Pools |
| 56 | Amalia Tătăran (ROU) | Round of Pools |
| 57 | Victoria Maria Isabel Meza Oceguera (MEX) | Round of Pools |
| 58 | Georgina Barratt (AUS) | Round of Pools |
| 59 | Ho Ka U (MAC) | Round of Pools |
| 60 | Yang Chin-man (TPE) | Round of Pools |
| 61 | Huang Liya (MAC) | Round of Pools |
| 62 | Sharayu Patil (IND) | Round of Pools |
| 63 | Kajal Kajal (IND) | Round of Pools |
| 64 | Mandira Thapa (NEP) | Round of Pools |
| 65 | Stephanie Wyllie (NZL) | Round of Pools |
