= Fencing at the 2024 Summer Olympics – Women's foil =

Women's foil at the Games of the XXXIII Olympiad
- Olympic fencing
- Venue: Grand Palais strip
- Date: 28 July 2024
- Competitors: 34 from 18 nations

Medalists
1st place, gold medalist(s)		Lee Kiefer	United States
2nd place, silver medalist(s)		Lauren Scruggs	United States
3rd place, bronze medalist(s)		Eleanor Harvey	Canada

The women's foil event at the 2024 Summer Olympics took place on 28 July 2024 at the Grand Palais strip.

== Background ==
This was the 24th appearance of the event, which has been held at every Summer Olympics since being introduced in 1924. Lee Kiefer defended her 2020 title, becoming the first to do so, since Valentina Vezzali. Inna Deriglazova, the gold medal winner in 2016 and silver medalist in 2020 as a runner-up, did not participate as Russia faced a ban during the games and formed a team of Individual Neutral Athletes, alongside Belarus, in reaction to the Russian invasion of Ukraine.

== Competition format ==
The 1996 tournament had vastly simplified the competition format into a single-elimination bracket, with a bronze medal match. The 2024 tournament continued to use that format. Fencing was done to 15 touches or to the completion of three three-minute rounds if neither fencer reaches 15 touches by then. At the end of time, the higher-scoring fencer was the winner; a tie resulted in an additional one-minute sudden-death time period. This sudden-death period was further modified by the selection of a draw-winner beforehand; if neither fencer scored a touch during the minute, the predetermined draw-winner won the bout. Standard foil rules regarding target area, striking, and priority were used.

== Schedule ==
The competition was held over a single day, Sunday, 28 July. Women's foil bouts alternate with the men's épée event bouts.

All times use Central European Summer Time (UTC+2)

Date	Time	Round
Sunday, 28 July 2024	9:30; 10:25; 14:05; 15:55; 19:00; 20:50	Round of 64; Round of 32; Round of 16; Quarterfinals; Semifinals; Finals

== Results ==
=== Finals ===
Semifinals
Lauren Scruggs (USA)	15
Eleanor Harvey (CAN)	9
Alice Volpi (ITA)	10
Lee Kiefer (USA)	15

Final
Lauren Scruggs (USA)	6
Lee Kiefer (USA)	15
Bronze medal bout
Eleanor Harvey (CAN)	15
Alice Volpi (ITA)	12

=== Top half ===
==== Section 1 ====
Round of 64
Samantha Catantan (PHI)	15
Mariana Pistoia (BRA)	13

Round of 32
Arianna Errigo (ITA)	15
Samantha Catantan (PHI)	12
Karin Miyawaki (JPN)	10
Eva Lacheray (FRA)	15
Lauren Scruggs (USA)	15
Amita Berthier (SGP)	13
Arantxa Inostroza (CHI)	7
Jessica Guo (CAN)	15

Round of 16
Arianna Errigo (ITA)	15
Eva Lacheray (FRA)	6
Lauren Scruggs (USA)	15
Jessica Guo (CAN)	11

Quarterfinals
Arianna Errigo (ITA)	14
Lauren Scruggs (USA)	15

==== Section 2 ====
Round of 64

Round of 32
Julia Walczyk (POL)	15
Ysaora Thibus (FRA)	12
Wang Yuting (CHN)	8
Eleanor Harvey (CAN)	12
Pauline Ranvier (FRA)	15
Maxine Esteban (CIV)	7
Sara Amr Hossny (EGY)	5
Martina Favaretto (ITA)	15

Round of 16
Julia Walczyk (POL)	6
Eleanor Harvey (CAN)	15
Pauline Ranvier (FRA)	9
Martina Favaretto (ITA)	15

Quarterfinals
Eleanor Harvey (CAN)	15
Martina Favaretto (ITA)	14

=== Bottom half ===
==== Section 3 ====
Round of 64

Round of 32
Alice Volpi (ITA)	15
Hanna Łyczbińska (POL)	11
Mălina Călugăreanu (ROU)	15
Yuka Ueno (JPN)	13
Sera Azuma (JPN)	14
Daphne Chan (HKG)	15
Malak Hamza (EGY)	3
Anne Sauer (GER)	15

Round of 16
Alice Volpi (ITA)	15
Mălina Călugăreanu (ROU)	9
Daphne Chan (HKG)	8
Anne Sauer (GER)	15

Quarterfinals
Alice Volpi (ITA)	15
Anne Sauer (GER)	12

==== Section 4 ====
Round of 64
Martyna Jelińska (POL)	15
Youssra Zekrani (MAR)	3

Round of 32
Chen Qingyuan (CHN)	7
Yunjia Zhang (CAN)	15
Flóra Pásztor (HUN)	15
Jacqueline Dubrovich (USA)	12
Huang Qianqian (CHN)	15
Yara El-Sharkawy (EGY)	5
Martyna Jelińska (POL)	13
Lee Kiefer (USA)	15

Round of 16
Yunjia Zhang (CAN)	5
Flóra Pásztor (HUN)	15
Huang Qianqian (CHN)	9
Lee Kiefer (USA)	15

Quarterfinals
Flóra Pásztor (HUN)	4
Lee Kiefer (USA)	15
