= Fencing at the 2017 Summer Universiade – Women's team foil =

Women's team foil at the XXIX Summer Universiade
- Venues: Taipei Nangang Exhibition Center
- Dates: August 2017
- Competitors: 52 from 14 nations

Medalists
1st place, gold medalist(s)		Beatrice Monaco; Olga Rachele Calissi; Valentina De Costanzo; Francesca Palumbo	Italy
2nd place, silver medalist(s)		Yana Alborova; Adelya Abdrakhmanova; Irina Elesina; Leyla Pirieva	Russia
3rd place, bronze medalist(s)		Hanna Łyczbińska; Julia Chrzanowska; Julia Walczyk; Martyna Jelińska	Poland

The women's team foil fencing event at the 2017 Summer Universiade was held 25 August at the Taipei Nangang Exhibition Center in Taipei, Taiwan.

== Seeds ==
Since the number of individual épée event participants were 65, 66 was the added number on those who did not participate in the individual event.

Tournament Seeding	Team	Name	RI
1 (13)	Russia	Yana Alborova	2
1 (13)	Russia	Adelya Abdrakhmanova	3
1 (13)	Russia	Irina Elesina	8
1 (13)	Russia	Leyla Pirieva	27
2 (35)	Hungary	Fanny Kreiss	1
2 (35)	Hungary	Lupkovics Dóra	12
2 (35)	Hungary	Kata Kondricz	22
2 (35)	Hungary	Orsolya Balogh	50
3 (41)	Italy	Beatrice Monaco	3
3 (41)	Italy	Olga Rachele Calissi	14
3 (41)	Italy	Valentina De Costanzo	24
3 (41)	Italy	Francesca Palumbo	26
4 (42)	Poland	Hanna Łyczbińska	9
4 (42)	Poland	Julia Chrzanowska	16
4 (42)	Poland	Julia Walczyk	17
4 (42)	Poland	Martyna Jelińska	18
5 (62)	Japan	Karin Miyawaki	10
5 (62)	Japan	Minami Kano	19
5 (62)	Japan	Rio Azuma	33
5 (62)	Japan	Honami Suzuki	66
6 (72)	France	Chloe Jubenot	7
6 (72)	France	Maeva Rancurel	28
6 (72)	France	Rozène Castanié	37
6 (72)	France	Solene Butruille	38
7 (74)	Romania	Mălina Călugăreanu	5
7 (74)	Romania	Maria Boldor	13
7 (74)	Romania	Amalia Tătăran	56
8 (100)	Austria	Olivia Wohlgemuth	11
8 (100)	Austria	Freya Cenker	23
8 (100)	Austria	Kim Weiss	66
8 (100)	Austria	Paula Schmidl	66
9 (102)	South Korea	Ko Chae-yeong	25
9 (102)	South Korea	Lee Se-joo	34
9 (102)	South Korea	Hong Hyo-jin	43
9 (102)	South Korea	Song A-young	47
10 (114)	Mexico	Alely Hernández	21
10 (114)	Mexico	Melissa Rebolledo	36
10 (114)	Mexico	Victoria Maria Isabel Meza Oceguera	57
11 (118)	Chinese Taipei	Cheng Hsin	31
11 (118)	Chinese Taipei	Chen Ling-yi	42
11 (118)	Chinese Taipei	Tsai Xiao-qing	45
11 (118)	Chinese Taipei	Yang Chin-man	60
12 (119)	China	Xu Mengxu	15
12 (119)	China	Kang Xinxin	51
12 (119)	China	Li Xin	53
13 (150)	India	Prakash Awati	40
13 (150)	India	Bindu Devi Sagolsem	48
13 (150)	India	Sharayu Patil	62
13 (150)	India	Kajal Kajal	63
14 (161)	Macau	Ho Peng I	41
14 (161)	Macau	Ho Ka U	59
14 (161)	Macau	Huang Liya	61

== Ranking Round ==
Round of 16
9	South Korea	45
8	Austria	34
5	Japan	38
12	China	45
13	India	18
4	Poland	45
3	Italy	45
14	Macau	9
11	Chinese Taipei	41
6	France	45
7	Romania	42
10	Mexico	45

Quarterfinals
1	Russia	45
9	South Korea	38
12	China	24
4	Poland	45
3	Italy	45
6	France	42
10	Mexico	36
2	Hungary	42

Semifinals
1	Russia	40
4	Poland	39
3	Italy	45
2	Hungary	31

Final
1	Russia	25
3	Italy	45

=== Bronze Medal ===
Third place
4	Poland	45
2	Hungary	31

== Final ranking ==
Rank	Team	Results
1st place, gold medalist(s)	Italy	Champion
2nd place, silver medalist(s)	Russia	Runner-up
3rd place, bronze medalist(s)	Poland	Third place
4	Hungary	Semifinals
5	France	Quarterfinals
6	South Korea	Quarterfinals
7	Mexico	Quarterfinals
8	China	Quarterfinals
9	Japan	Round of 16
10	Romania	Round of 16
11	Austria	Round of 16
12	Chinese Taipei	Round of 16
13	India	Round of 16
14	Macau	Round of 16
