= Fencing at the 2020 Summer Olympics – Women's foil =

Fencing at the Olympics

Women's foil at the Games of the XXXII Olympiad
- Olympic fencing
- Venue: Makuhari Messe
- Date: 25 July 2021
- Competitors: 34 from 18 nations

Medalists
| 1st place, gold medalist(s) | | Lee Kiefer | United States |
| 2nd place, silver medalist(s) | | Inna Deriglazova | ROC |
| 3rd place, bronze medalist(s) | | Larisa Korobeynikova | ROC |

The women's foil event at the 2020 Summer Olympics took place on 25 July 2021 at the Makuhari Messe. 34 fencers from 18 nations are expected to compete.

== Background ==
This will be the 23rd appearance of the event, which has been held at every Summer Olympics since women's fencing was introduced in 1924.

The reigning Olympic champion is Inna Deriglazova of Russia. She is also the reigning (2019) World Champion, with 2015 and 2017 World Championship wins as well. A preview from Olympics.com identified Deriglazova as the top star on a strong Russian fencing team. Lee Kiefer, who did not reach the finals in the previous Olympics in 2012 and 2016, made history as the first American to win an individual gold medal in foil fencing, and she is the second woman to achieve this, following Mariel Zagunis, a five-time Olympian and two-time gold medalist in women's sabre.

== Qualification ==
A National Olympic Committee (NOC) could enter up to 3 qualified fencers in the women's foil. Nations were limited to three fencers each from 1928 to 2004. However, the 2008 Games introduced a rotation of women's team fencing events with one weapon left off each Games; the individual event without a corresponding team event had the number of fencers per nation reduced to two. Women's foil was the third event this applied to, so each nation could enter a maximum of two fencers in the event in 2016. The 2020 Games eliminated this rotation and all weapons had team events.

There are 34 dedicated quota spots for women's foil. The first 24 spots go to the 3 members of each of the 8 qualified teams in the team foil event. Next, 6 more men are selected from the world rankings based on continents: 2 from Europe, 1 from the Americas, 2 from Asia/Oceania, and 1 from Africa. Finally, 4 spots are allocated by continental qualifying events: 1 from Europe, 1 from the Americas, 1 from Asia/Oceania, and 1 from Africa. Each nation can earn only one spot through rankings or events.

Additionally, there are 8 host/invitational spots that can be spread throughout the various fencing events. Japan did not use any host places in women's foil.

The COVID-19 pandemic delayed many of the events for qualifying for fencing, moving the close of the rankings period back to April 5, 2021, rather than the original April 4, 2020.

== Competition format ==
The 1996 tournament had vastly simplified the competition format into a single-elimination bracket, with a bronze medal match. The 2020 tournament will continue to use that format. Fencing is done to 15 touches or to the completion of three three-minute rounds if neither fencer reaches 15 touches by then. At the end of time, the higher-scoring fencer is the winner; a tie results in an additional one-minute sudden-death time period. This sudden-death period is further modified by the selection of a draw-winner beforehand; if neither fencer scores a touch during the minute, the predetermined draw-winner wins the bout. Standard foil rules regarding target area, striking, and priority are used.

== Schedule ==
The competition is held over a single day, Sunday, 25 July. The first session runs from 9 a.m. to approximately 4:20 p.m. (when the quarterfinals are expected to conclude), after which there is a break until 6 p.m. before the semifinals and medal bouts are held. Women's foil bouts alternate with the men's épée event bouts.

All times are Japan Standard Time (UTC+9)

| Date | Time | Round |
|---|---|---|
| Sunday, 25 July 2021 | 9:00 18:00 | Round of 64; Round of 32; Round of 16; Quarterfinals; Semifinals; Bronze medal match Final |

== Results ==
=== Finals ===
Semifinals
Inna Deriglazova (ROC) | 15
Alice Volpi (ITA) | 10
Lee Kiefer (USA) | 15
Larisa Korobeynikova (ROC) | 6

Final
Inna Deriglazova (ROC) | 13
Lee Kiefer (USA) | 15
Bronze medal bout
Alice Volpi (ITA) | 14
Larisa Korobeynikova (ROC) | 15

=== Top half ===
==== Section 1 ====
Round of 64
Katina Proestakis (CHI) | 12
Martyna Jelińska (POL) | 15

Round of 32
Inna Deriglazova (ROC) | 15
Martyna Jelińska (POL) | 8
Martina Batini (ITA) | 10
Fanni Kreiss (HUN) | 15
Jeon Hee-sook (KOR) | 11
Rio Azuma (JPN) | 10
Noha Hany (EGY) | 6
Chen Qingyuan (CHN) | 15

Round of 16
Inna Deriglazova (ROC) | 15
Fanni Kreiss (HUN) | 10
Jeon Hee-sook (KOR) | 14
Chen Qingyuan (CHN) | 11

Quarterfinals
Inna Deriglazova (ROC) | 15
Jeon Hee-sook (KOR) | 7

==== Section 2 ====
Round of 64

Round of 32
Arianna Errigo (ITA) | 15
Yara El-Sharkawy (EGY) | 2
Anita Blaze (FRA) | 12
Jessica Guo (CAN) | 15
Leonie Ebert (GER) | 15
Jacqueline Dubrovich (USA) | 14
Kata Kondricz (HUN) | 5
Alice Volpi (ITA) | 15

Round of 16
Arianna Errigo (ITA) | 15
Jessica Guo (CAN) | 8
Leonie Ebert (GER) | 13
Alice Volpi (ITA) | 15

Quarterfinals
Arianna Errigo (ITA) | 7
Alice Volpi (ITA) | 15

=== Bottom half ===
==== Section 3 ====
Round of 64

Round of 32
Lee Kiefer (USA) | 15
Amita Berthier (SGP) | 4
Eleanor Harvey (CAN) | 15
Pauline Ranvier (FRA) | 9
Nicole Ross (USA) | 15
İrem Karamete (TUR) | 5
Noura Mohamed (EGY) | 5
Yuka Ueno (JPN) | 15

Round of 16
Lee Kiefer (USA) | 15
Eleanor Harvey (CAN) | 13
Nicole Ross (USA) | 9
Yuka Ueno (JPN) | 15

Quarterfinals
Lee Kiefer (USA) | 15
Yuka Ueno (JPN) | 11

==== Section 4 ====
Round of 64
Meriem Mebarki (ALG) | 8
Flóra Pásztor (HUN) | 15

Round of 32
Adelina Zagidullina (ROC) | 15
Saskia Loretta van Erven Garcia (COL) | 8
Kelleigh Ryan (CAN) | 12
Sera Azuma (JPN) | 11
Larisa Korobeynikova (ROC) | 15
Inès Boubakri (TUN) | 3
Flóra Pásztor (HUN) | 13
Ysaora Thibus (FRA) | 15

Round of 16
Adelina Zagidullina (ROC) | 9
Kelleigh Ryan (CAN) | 15
Larisa Korobeynikova (ROC) | 15
Ysaora Thibus (FRA) | 12

Quarterfinals
Kelleigh Ryan (CAN) | 11
Larisa Korobeynikova (ROC) | 15
