= Fencing at the 2020 Summer Olympics – Women's team foil =

Fencing at the Olympics

Women's team foil at the Games of the XXXII Olympiad
- Olympic fencing
- Venue: Makuhari Messe
- Date: 29 July 2021
- Competitors: 32 from 8 nations

Medalists
| 1st place, gold medalist(s) | | Inna Deriglazova; Adelina Zagidullina; Larisa Korobeynikova; Marta Martyanova | ROC |
| 2nd place, silver medalist(s) | | Anita Blaze; Astrid Guyart; Pauline Ranvier; Ysaora Thibus | France |
| 3rd place, bronze medalist(s) | | Erica Cipressa; Arianna Errigo; Martina Batini; Alice Volpi | Italy |

The women's team foil event at the 2020 Summer Olympics took place on 29 July 2021 at the Makuhari Messe. 24 fencers (8 teams of 3) from 8 nations are expected to compete.

== Background ==
This was the 14th appearance of the event. It was first held in 1960 and held each Summer Olympics from then until 2000. It was omitted in 2004 (to make room for women's individual sabre). It returned in 2008 and 2012 but was omitted again in 2016 (2008 through 2016 were rotational years when team events were rotated off the schedule, with only two of the three weapons for each of the men's and women's categories). Women's team foil returns again in 2020. Since 1992, the event was only won by Italy and Russia.

The reigning (2012) Olympic champion is Italy (Valentina Vezzali, Elisa Di Francisca, Arianna Errigo, and Ilaria Salvatori). The reigning (2019) World Champion is Russia (Inna Deriglazova, Anastasiia Ivanova, Larisa Korobeynikova, and Adelina Zagidullina).

== Qualification ==
A National Olympic Committee (NOC) could enter a team of 3 fencers in the women's team foil. These fencers also automatically qualified for the individual event.

There are 8 dedicated quota spots for women's team foil. They are allocated as through the world team ranking list of 5 April 2021. The top 4 spots, regardless of geographic zone, qualify (ROC, Italy, France, and the United States). The next four spots are allocated to separate geographic zones, as long as an NOC from that zone is in the top 16. These places went to Japan (Asia/Oceania), Canada (Americas), Egypt (Africa), and Hungary (Europe).

Additionally, there are 8 host/invitational spots that can be spread throughout the various fencing events. Because Japan qualified a women's team through normal team qualification, it did not need to use any host quota places for women's team foil.

The COVID-19 pandemic delayed many of the events for qualifying for fencing, moving the close of the rankings period back to April 5, 2021 rather than the original April 4, 2020.

== Competition format ==
The 2020 tournament is a single-elimination tournament, with classification matches for all places. Each match features the three fencers on each team competing in a round-robin, with 9 three-minute bouts to 5 points; the winning team is the one that reaches 45 total points first or is leading after the end of the nine bouts. Standard foil rules regarding target area, striking, and priority are used.

== Schedule ==
The competition is held over a single day, Thursday, 29 July. The first session runs from 10:50 a.m. to approximately 4:25 p.m. (when all matches except the bronze and gold medal finals are expected to conclude), after which there is a break until 6:30 p.m. before the medal bouts are held.

All times are Japan Standard Time (UTC+9)

| Date | Time | Round |
|---|---|---|
| Thursday, 29 July 2021 | 10:50 18:30 | Quarterfinals; Semifinals; Classification 7/8; Classification 5/6; Bronze medal match Gold medal match |

== Results ==
Quarter-finals
ROC | 45
Egypt | 21
Japan | 36
United States | 45
France | 45
Canada | 29
Hungary | 32
Italy | 45

Semi-finals
ROC | 45
United States | 42
France | 45
Italy | 43

Final
ROC | 45
France | 34
Bronze medal bout
Italy | 45
United States | 23

5–8th place classification

5–8th place semifinals
Egypt | 27
Japan | 45
Canada | 45
Hungary | 33

Fifth place bout
Japan | 31
Canada | 45
Seventh place bout
Egypt | 28
Hungary | 45

== Final classification ==
| Rank | Team | Athlete |
|---|---|---|
| 1st place, gold medalist(s) | ROC | Inna Deriglazova; Adelina Zagidullina; Larisa Korobeynikova; Marta Martyanova |
| 2nd place, silver medalist(s) | France | Anita Blaze; Astrid Guyart; Pauline Ranvier; Ysaora Thibus |
| 3rd place, bronze medalist(s) | Italy | Erica Cipressa; Arianna Errigo; Martina Batini; Alice Volpi |
| 4 | United States | Jacqueline Dubrovich; Lee Kiefer; Nicole Ross; Sabrina Massialas |
| 5 | Canada | Alanna Goldie; Jessica Guo; Eleanor Harvey; Kelleigh Ryan |
| 6 | Japan | Sera Azuma; Yuka Ueno; Sumire Tsuji; Rio Azuma |
| 7 | Hungary | Fanni Kreiss; Kata Kondricz; Flóra Pásztor; Aida Mohamed |
| 8 | Egypt | Yara El-Sharkawy; Noha Hany; Mariam El-Zoheiry; Noura Mohamed |
