= Fencing at the 2017 Summer Universiade =

Fencing at the XXIX Summer Universiade
- Venues: Taipei Nangang Exhibition Center
- Dates: 20–25 August 2017
- Competitors: 447 from 54 nations

Fencing was contested at the 2017 Summer Universiade from August 20 to 25 at the National Taipei Nangang Exhibition Center in Taipei, Taiwan.

== Participating nations ==
447 fencers from 54 nations participated at the 2017 Summer Universiade.

- Argentina (6)
- Armenia (2)
- Australia (6)
- Austria (6)
- Belarus (4)
- Belgium (2)
- Brazil (6)
- Bulgaria (2)
- Canada (2)
- China (16)
- Chinese Taipei (18)
- Costa Rica (2)
- Cyprus (1)
- Czech Republic (2)
- Denmark (2)
- Estonia (6)
- Finland (7)
- France (24)
- Germany (9)
- Greece (1)
- Hong Kong (13)
- Hungary (24)
- India (24)
- Indonesia (3)
- Iran (7)
- Israel (6)
- Italy (24)
- Japan (21)
- Kazakhstan (11)
- Latvia (1)
- Lebanon (1)
- Luxembourg (1)
- Macau (4)
- Malaysia (2)
- Mexico (4)
- Mongolia (8)
- Nepal (3)
- Netherlands (9)
- New Zealand (1)
- Poland (24)
- Portugal (4)
- Romania (7)
- Russia (24)
- Singapore (5)
- Slovakia (5)
- Slovenia (2)
- South Africa (2)
- South Korea (24)
- Sweden (10)
- Switzerland (8)
- Thailand (3)
- Turkey (2)
- Ukraine (16)
- United States (20)

== Medal summary ==
=== Medal table ===
Rank	Nation	Gold	Silver	Bronze	Total
1	Hungary	3	3	0	6
2	Russia	2	3	1	6
3	Japan	2	1	2	5
4	Ukraine	2	0	2	4
5	Poland	1	1	3	5
6	South Korea	1	1	1	3
7	Italy	1	0	6	7
8	Iran	0	1	2	3
9	Turkey	0	1	0	1
9	United States	0	1	0	1
11	France	0	0	1	1
Totals (11 entries)		12	12	18	42

=== Men's events ===
Event	Gold	Silver	Bronze
Individual épée	Sergey Bida; Russia	Zsombor Bányai; Hungary	Masaru Yamada; Japan
Individual épée	Sergey Bida; Russia	Zsombor Bányai; Hungary	Filip Broniszewski; Poland
Individual sabre	András Szatmári; Hungary	Enver Yildirim; Turkey	Mohammad Rahbari; Iran
Individual sabre	András Szatmári; Hungary	Enver Yildirim; Turkey	Mohammad Fotouhi; Iran
Individual foil	Dmytro Chuchukalo; Ukraine	Kyosuke Matsuyama; Japan	Alessandro Paroli; Italy
Individual foil	Dmytro Chuchukalo; Ukraine	Kyosuke Matsuyama; Japan	Rostyslav Hertsyk; Ukraine
Team épée	Russia (RUS); Sergey Bida; Alan Fardzinov; Dmitriy Gusev; Georgiy Bruev	Hungary (HUN); Daniel Berta; Sándor Cho Taeun; Gergely Siklósi; Zsombor Bányai	South Korea (KOR); Pak Min-woo; Jang Hyo-min; Hwang Hyeon-il; Kim Jae-won
Team sabre	South Korea (KOR); Oh Sang-uk; Gu Bon-gil; Kim Jun-ho; Jang Tea-hoon	Iran (IRI); Mohammad Fotouhi; Mohammad Rahbari; Ali Pakdaman; Farzad Baher	Italy (ITA); Dario Cavaliere; Francesco D'Armiento; Riccardo Nuccio; Lorenzo Romano
Team foil	Japan (JPN); Kyosuke Matsuyama; Takahiro Shikine; Toshiya Saito; Ryohei Noguchi	Russia (RUS); Askar Khamzin; Grigoriy Semenyuk; Alexander Sirotkin; Iskander Akhmetov	Italy (ITA); Guillaume Bianchi; Edoardo Luperi; Alessandro Paroli; Francesco Trani

=== Women's events ===
Event	Gold	Silver	Bronze
Individual épée	Aleksandra Zamachowska; Poland	Kamila Pytka; Poland	Roberta Marzani; Italy
Individual épée	Aleksandra Zamachowska; Poland	Kamila Pytka; Poland	Kseniya Pantelyeyeva; Ukraine
Individual sabre	Anna Márton; Hungary	Hwang Seon-a; South Korea	Chiara Mormile; Italy
Individual sabre	Anna Márton; Hungary	Hwang Seon-a; South Korea	Misaki Emura; Japan
Individual foil	Fanny Kreiss; Hungary	Yana Alborova; Russia	Adelya Abdrakhmanova; Russia
Individual foil	Fanny Kreiss; Hungary	Yana Alborova; Russia	Beatrice Monaco; Italy
Team épée	Ukraine (UKR); Dzhoan Bezhura; Anfisa Pochkalova; Kseniya Pantelyeyeva; Yuliya Svystil	United States (USA); Katharine Holmes; Anna van Brummen; Catherine Nixon; Barbara Vanbenthuysen	Poland (POL); Barbara Rutz; Kamila Pytka; Martyna Swatowska; Aleksandra Zamachowska
Team sabre	Japan (JPN); Shihomi Fukushima; Misaki Emura; Ayaka Mukae; Risa Takashima	Hungary (HUN); Petra Zahonyi; Julia Mikulik; Renata Katona; Anna Marton	France (FRA); Margaux Gimalac; Caroline Queroli; Margaux Rifkiss; Charleine Taillandier
Team foil	Italy (ITA); Olga Calissi; Valentina De Costanzo; Francesca Palumbo; Beatrice Monaco	Russia (RUS); Leyla Pirieva; Adelya Abdrakhmanova; Yana Alborova; Irina Elesina	Poland (POL); Julia Walczyk; Martyna Jelińska; Julia Chrzanowska; Hanna Łyczbińska
