= Fencing at the 2015 European Games – Women's foil =

Women's foil at the 2015 European Games
- Venue: Crystal Hall 3
- Date: 24 June
- Competitors: 36 from 18 nations

Medalists
gold medal	Alice Volpi	Italy
silver medal	Yana Alborova	Russia
bronze medal	Adelina Zagidullina	Russia
bronze medal	Valentina Cipriani	Italy

The women's foil competition at the 2015 European Games in Baku was held on 24 June at the Crystal Hall 3.

== Schedule ==
All times are local (UTC+5).

Date	Time	Event
Wednesday, 24 June 2015	10:30	Preliminaries
Wednesday, 24 June 2015	14:10	Round of 32
Wednesday, 24 June 2015	15:30	Round of 16
Wednesday, 24 June 2015	16:30	Quarterfinals
Wednesday, 24 June 2015	19:20	Semifinals
Wednesday, 24 June 2015	20:30	Final

== Results ==
=== Preliminaries ===
==== Pool A ====
Seed	Athlete	(Italy)	(Czech Republic)	(France)	(Poland)	(Hungary)	(Russia)	V	B	V/B	HS	HR	Diff.	RP	RT
13	Valentina Cipriani (ITA)		V	1	V	0	4	2	5	0.400	15	20	–5	5	23
24	Andrea Bímová (CZE)	3		V	3	3	2	1	5	0.200	16	20	–4	6	28
14	Jéromine Mpah-Njanga (FRA)	V	0		4	V	V	3	5	0.600	19	17	2	3	14
25	Anna Szymczak (POL)	2	V	V		2	V	3	5	0.600	19	21	–2	4	19
36	Flóra Pásztor (HUN)	V	V	4	V		3	3	5	0.600	22	15	7	1	10
1	Adelina Zagidullina (RUS)	V	V	2	4	V		3	5	0.600	21	19	2	2	13

==== Pool B ====
Seed	Athlete	(Hungary)	(Germany)	(Italy)	(Poland)	(Russia)	(Greece)	V	B	V/B	HS	HR	Diff.	RP	RT
26	Viktória Schmél (HUN)		1	3	V	1	4	1	5	0.200	14	21	–7	6	32
2	Carolin Golubytskyi (GER)	V		V	V	4	4	3	5	0.600	23	13	10	2	9
11	Carolina Erba (ITA)	V	1		2	V	V	3	5	0.600	18	17	1	3	17
23	Julia Walczyk (POL)	1	1	V		0	V	2	5	0.400	12	19	–7	4	25
12	Yana Alborova (RUS)	V	V	4	V		V	4	5	0.800	24	10	14	1	3
35	Aikaterini Kontochristopoulou (GRE)	V	V	0	2	0		2	5	0.400	12	23	–11	5	26

==== Pool C ====
Seed	Athlete	(Georgia (country))	(United Kingdom)	(Israel)	(Germany)	(France)	(Romania)	V	B	V/B	HS	HR	Diff.	RP	RT
27	Teona Goglidze (GEO)		4	3	2	2	V	1	5	0.200	16	23	–7	6	31
10	Natalia Sheppard (GBR)	V		V4	1	V	V4	4	5	0.800	19	18	1	2	8
34	Delila Hatuel (ISR)	V	3		V	V	4	3	5	0.600	22	18	4	3	11
3	Anne Sauer (GER)	V	V4	2		V	V	4	5	0.800	21	13	8	1	6
15	Julie Huin (FRA)	V	4	4	3		2	1	5	0.200	18	22	–4	5	27
22	Maria Boldor (ROU)	3	3	V	2	V		2	5	0.400	18	20	–2	4	21

==== Pool D ====
Seed	Athlete	(Turkey)	(Germany)	(Croatia)	(France)	(Italy)	(Belgium)	V	B	V/B	HS	HR	Diff.	RP	RT
16	İrem Karamete (TUR)		3	V	4	1	V	2	5	0.400	18	19	–1	4	20
20	Franziska Schmitz (GER)	V		V	2	1	1	2	5	0.400	14	20	–6	5	24
33	Marcela Dajčić (CRO)	3	2		1	0	2	0	5	0.000	8	25	–17	6	36
9	Gaëlle Gebet (FRA)	V	V	V		3	2	3	5	0.600	20	17	3	2	12
4	Alice Volpi (ITA)	V	V	V	V		V	5	5	1.000	25	6	19	1	1
28	Delphine Groslambert (BEL)	1	V	V	V	1		3	5	0.600	17	15	2	3	16

==== Pool E ====
Seed	Athlete	(France)	(Germany)	(Italy)	(Poland)	(Hungary)	(Russia)	V	B	V/B	HS	HR	Diff.	RP	RT
29	Chloé Jubénot (FRA)		4	2	3	V	3	1	5	0.200	17	24	–7	5	30
17	Eva Hampel (GER)	V		V	V	V	V	5	5	1.000	25	12	13	1	2
5	Chiara Cini (ITA)	V	4		V	V	0	3	5	0.600	19	20	–1	3	18
21	Natalia Gołębiowska (POL)	V	2	4		2	2	1	5	0.200	15	23	–8	6	33
32	Dóra Lupkovics (HUN)	4	2	4	V		1	1	5	0.200	16	22	–6	4	29
8	Anastasiia Ivanova (RUS)	V	0	V	V	V		4	5	0.800	20	11	9	2	5

==== Pool F ====
Seed	Athlete	(Hungary)	(Slovakia)	(Russia)	(Ukraine)	(Austria)	(Poland)	V	B	V/B	HS	HR	Diff.	RP	RT
31	Fruzsina Gólya (HUN)		V	3	V	V	V	4	5	0.800	23	10	13	1	4
19	Michala Cellerová (SVK)	2		2	V	0	3	1	5	0.200	12	21	–9	5	34
7	Diana Yakovleva (RUS)	V4	V		V	3	V	4	5	0.800	22	15	7	2	7
6	Olga Leleyko (UKR)	2	1	4		V4	2	1	5	0.200	13	23	–10	6	35
18	Olivia Wohlgemuth (AUT)	1	V	V4	3		V	3	5	0.600	18	16	2	3	15
30	Julia Chrzanowska (POL)	1	V	2	V	4		2	5	0.400	17	20	–3	4	22

=== Knockout round ===
==== Final ====
Final
1	Alice Volpi (ITA)	15
3	Yana Alborova (RUS)	11

==== Top half ====
Round of 32
17	Carolina Erba (ITA)	15
16	Delphine Groslambert (BEL)	4
9	Carolin Golubytskyi (GER)	15
24	Franziska Schmitz (GER)	9
25	Julia Walczyk (POL)	7
8	Natalia Sheppard (GBR)	13
5	Anastasiia Ivanova (RUS)	15
28	Andrea Bímová (CZE)	5
21	Maria Boldor (ROU)	15
12	Gaëlle Gebet (FRA)	10
13	Adelina Zagidullina (RUS)	15
20	İrem Karamete (TUR)	1

Round of 16
1	Alice Volpi (ITA)	15
17	Carolina Erba (ITA)	12
9	Carolin Golubytskyi (GER)	13
8	Natalia Sheppard (GBR)	12
5	Anastasiia Ivanova (RUS)	15
21	Maria Boldor (ROU)	8
13	Adelina Zagidullina (RUS)	15
4	Fruzsina Gólya (HUN)	10

Quarterfinals
1	Alice Volpi (ITA)	15
9	Carolin Golubytskyi (GER)	5
5	Anastasiia Ivanova (RUS)	9
13	Adelina Zagidullina (RUS)	13

Semifinals
1	Alice Volpi (ITA)	15
13	Adelina Zagidullina (RUS)	13

==== Bottom half ====
Round of 32
19	Anna Szymczak (POL)	9
14	Jéromine Mpah-Njanga (FRA)	15
11	Delila Hatuel (ISR)	15
22	Julia Chrzanowska (POL)	14
27	Julie Huin (FRA)	7
6	Anne Sauer (GER)	15
7	Diana Yakovleva (RUS)	15
26	Aikaterini Kontochristopoulou (GRE)	8
23	Valentina Cipriani (ITA)	15
10	Flóra Pásztor (HUN)	9
15	Olivia Wohlgemuth (AUT)	9
18	Chiara Cini (ITA)	15

Round of 16
3	Yana Alborova (RUS)	15
14	Jéromine Mpah-Njanga (FRA)	12
11	Delila Hatuel (ISR)	8
6	Anne Sauer (GER)	15
7	Diana Yakovleva (RUS)	9
23	Valentina Cipriani (ITA)	15
18	Chiara Cini (ITA)	12
2	Eva Hampel (GER)	15

Quarterfinals
3	Yana Alborova (RUS)	15
6	Anne Sauer (GER)	11
23	Valentina Cipriani (ITA)	15
2	Eva Hampel (GER)	11

Semifinals
3	Yana Alborova (RUS)	15
23	Valentina Cipriani (ITA)	10
