= Fencing at the 2015 European Games – Women's team foil =

Women's team foil at the 2015 European Games
- Venue: Crystal Hall 3
- Date: 26 June
- Competitors: 24 from 6 nations

Medalists
gold medal	Yana Alborova; Anastasiia Ivanova; Diana Yakovleva; Adelina Zagidullina	Russia
silver medal	Gaëlle Gebet; Julie Huin; Chloé Jubénot; Jéromine Mpah-Njanga	France
bronze medal	Chiara Cini; Valentina Cipriani; Carolina Erba; Alice Volpi	Italy

The women's team foil competition at the 2015 European Games in Baku was held on 26 June at the Crystal Hall 3.

== Results ==
Quarterfinals
Poland	45
Germany	43
France	45
Hungary	33

Semifinals
Russia	45
Poland	21
France	45
Italy	29

Final
Russia	45
France	18
Third place
Poland	28
Italy	45

Fifth place
Germany	45
Hungary	29

== Final standing ==
Rank	Team
1st place, gold medalist(s)	Russia; Yana Alborova; Anastasiia Ivanova; Diana Yakovleva; Adelina Zagidullina
2nd place, silver medalist(s)	France; Gaëlle Gebet; Julie Huin; Chloé Jubénot; Jéromine Mpah-Njanga
3rd place, bronze medalist(s)	Italy; Chiara Cini; Valentina Cipriani; Carolina Erba; Alice Volpi
4	Poland; Julia Chrzanowska; Natalia Gołębiowska; Anna Szymczak; Julia Walczyk
5	Germany; Carolin Golubytskyi; Eva Hampel; Anne Sauer; Franziska Schmitz
6	Hungary; Fruzsina Gólya; Dóra Lupkovics; Flóra Pásztor; Viktória Schmél
