= Yana Alborova =

Russian-Uzbekistani fencer (born 1994)

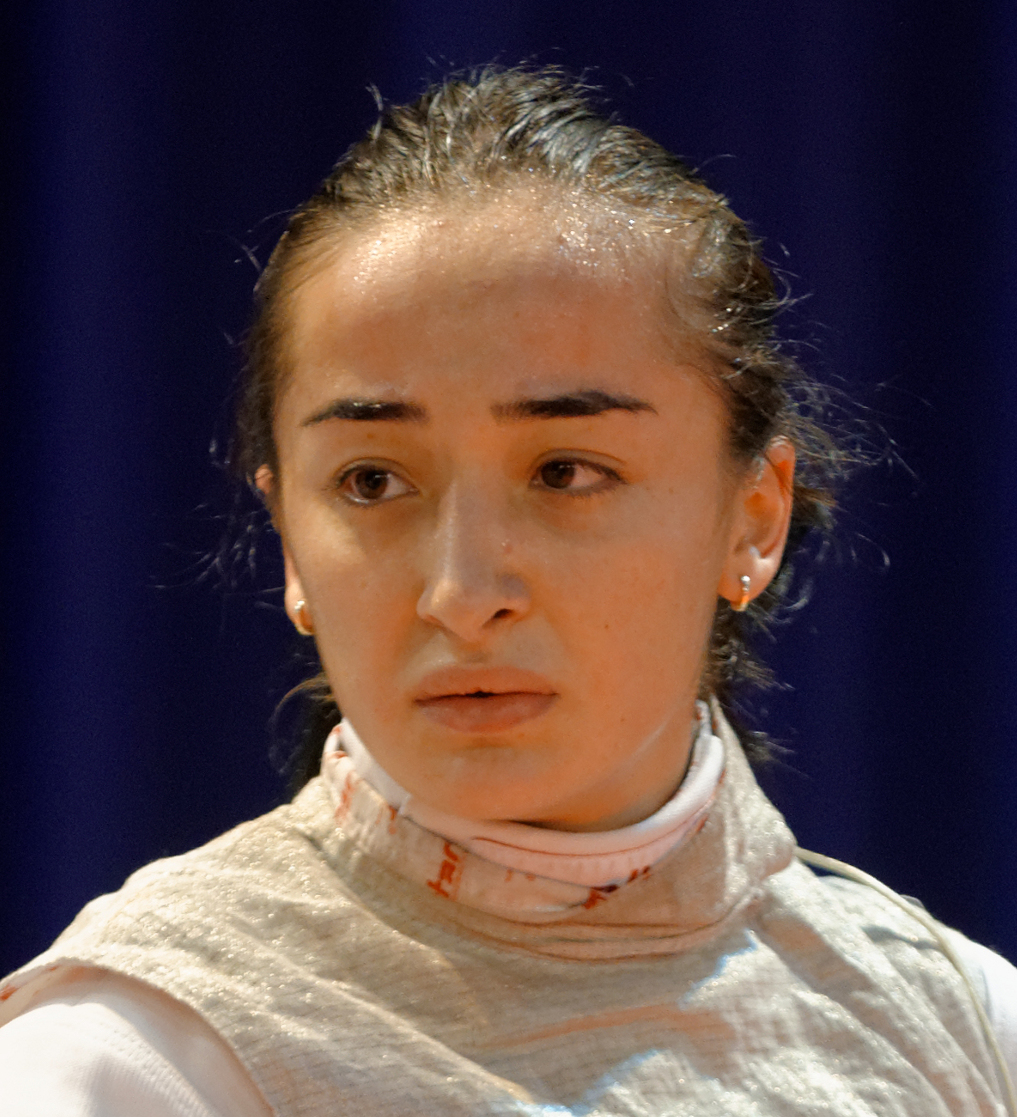
- Yana Alborova in 2014.

Personal information
- Born: 24 January 1994 (age 32)

Fencing career
- Sport: Fencing
- Country: Uzbekistan since 2019
- Former country: Russia
- Current ranking: FIE current ranking
Medal record
Women's foil fencing
Representing Russia
European Games
Gold medal – first place	2015 Baku	Team
Silver medal – second place	2015 Baku	Individual
Summer Universiade
Silver medal – second place	2017 Taipei	Individual
Silver medal – second place	2017 Taipei	Team

Yana Alborova (Russian: Яна Алборова; born 24 January 1994) is a Russian-Uzbekistani foil fencer, now representing Uzbekistan internationally. In 2015, she won the silver medal in the women's foil event at the 2015 European Games held in Baku, Azerbaijan. She also won the gold medal in the women's team foil event.

In 2017, she won the silver medal in both the women's individual foil and women's team foil events at the 2017 Summer Universiade held in Taipei, Taiwan.

Since 2019 Alborova has been representing Uzbekistan. She competed in the women's foil event at the 2019 World Fencing Championships held in Budapest, Hungary without winning a medal. She was eliminated in her first match by Kata Kondricz of Hungary.
