= Paul ApSimon =

Canadian fencer and coach

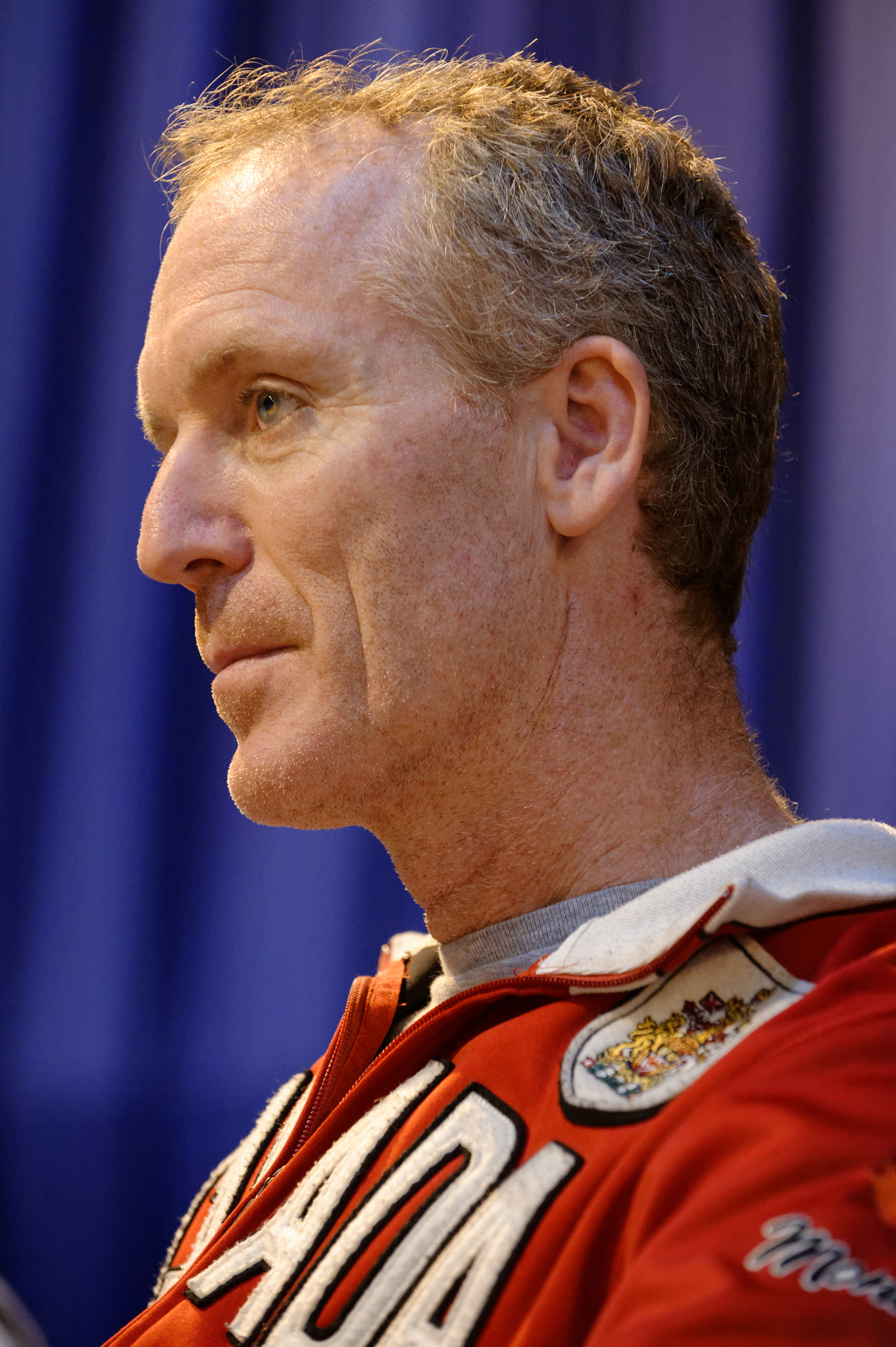
ApSimon at the 2015 Paris World Cup

Paul ApSimon is a Canadian fencer and coach. He has coached Canadian fencers at the 2000 Summer Olympics, the 2012 Summer Olympics, and the 2016 Summer Olympics. He also coached pentathletes at the 2012 Olympics.

He most recently coached Trinity Lowthian at the 2024 Summer Paralympics, achieving Canada's best ever result in wheelchair fencing at the Paralympics.
