= Inès Boubakri =

Tunisian fencer (born 1988)

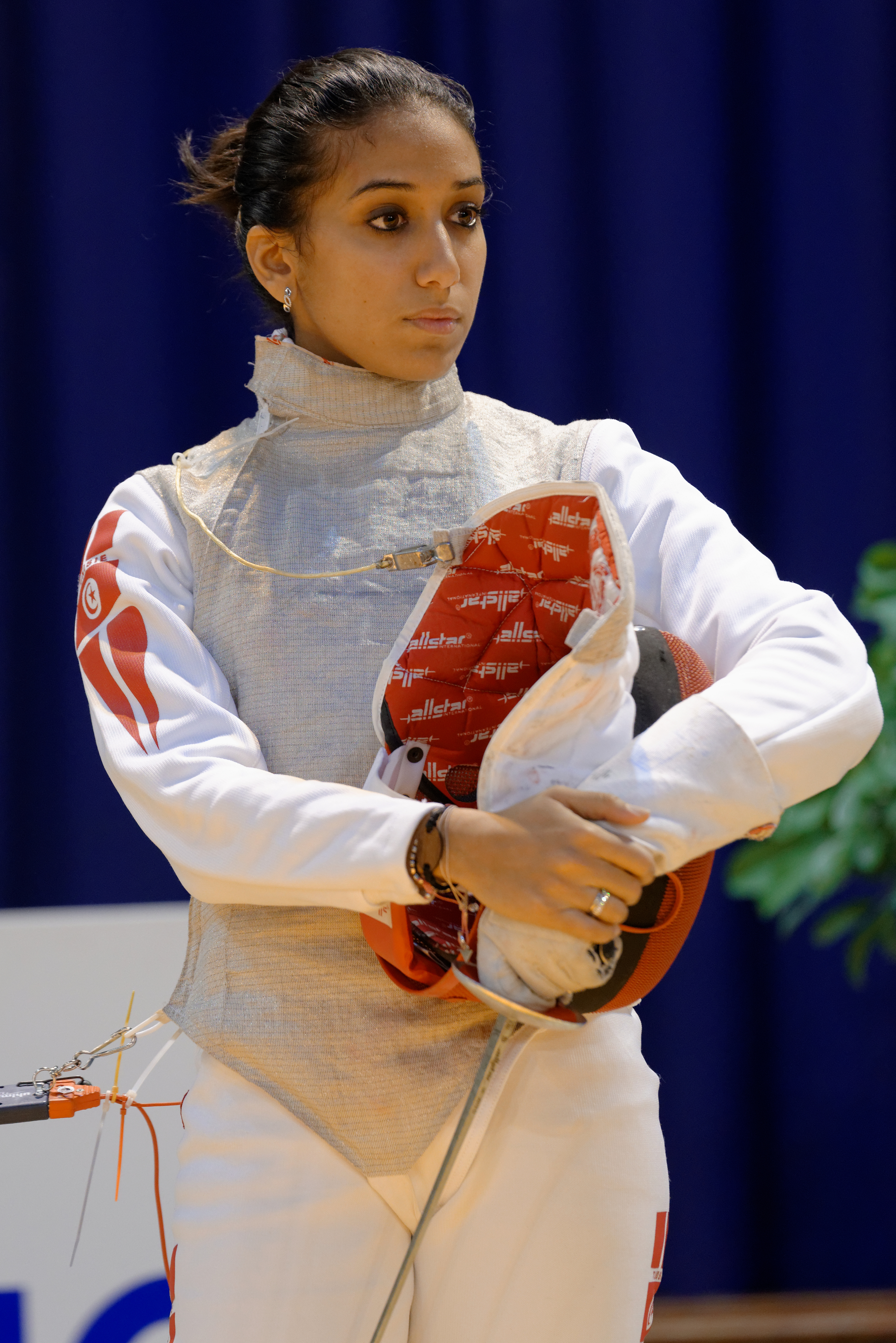
- Boubakri in 2014

Personal information
- Born: 28 December 1988 (age 37) Tunis, Tunisia
- Height: 1.67 m (5 ft 6 in)
- Weight: 56 kg (123 lb)

Fencing career
- Sport: Fencing
- Weapon: Foil
- Hand: left-handed
- Club: Association sportive de Bourg-la-Reine
- Head coach: Yann Detienne
- FIE ranking: current ranking
Medal record
Women's foil
Representing Tunisia
Olympic Games
| Bronze medal – third place | 2016 Rio de Janeiro | Individual |
World Championships
| Bronze medal – third place | 2014 Kazan | Individual |
| Bronze medal – third place | 2018 Wuxi | Individual |
Mediterranean Games
| Gold medal – first place | 2018 Tarragona | Individual |
| Silver medal – second place | 2013 Mersin | Individual |
| Bronze medal – third place | 2009 Pescara | Individual |
African Games
| Gold medal – first place | 2019 Salé | Individual Foil |

Inès Boubakri (Arabic: إيناس بوبكري; born 28 December 1988) is a Tunisian foil fencer. She is a four-time Olympian, who won a bronze medal at the 2016 Summer Olympics, and is a member of Association sportive de Bourg-la-Reine in France, under head coach Yann Detienne.

== Career ==
Boubakri represented Tunisia at the 2008 Summer Olympics in Beijing, where she competed in the women's individual foil event. She lost the first preliminary round match to Chinese-born Canadian fencer and former Olympic gold medalist Jujie Luan with a score of 9–13.

At the 2012 Summer Olympics in London, Boubakri qualified for the second time in the women's individual foil event. Unlike her previous Olympics, she excelled through the preliminary rounds by defeating United States' Nicole Ross, and France's Astrid Guyart. Boubakri reached the quarterfinal match of this event, where she was defeated by Italian fencer and three-time Olympic champion Valentina Vezzali, who scored a point during the "sudden death minute" leading to a final score of 7–8.

Four years later, at the 2016 Summer Olympics in Rio de Janeiro, she became the first Tunisian as well as the first African and Arab woman to win an Olympic medal in fencing when she won the bronze, on her way to the medal she beat Noura Mohamed from Egypt, Japanese fencer Shiho Nishioka and then Canadian Eleanor Harvey before losing in the semi-finals to the reigning Olympic Champion from Italy Elisa Di Francisca, in the medal match she was up against the Russian Aida Shanayeva. She won 15–11 after being down by 4–7 in the first period.

She competed at the 2020 Summer Olympics in the women's individual foil.

== Family ==
In 2014 Boubakri married French fencer Erwann Le Péchoux, who also won a medal at the 2016 Summer Olympics.

== See also ==
- Muslim women in sport

Olympic Games
| Preceded by Oussama Mellouli | Flag bearer for Tunisia; Tokyo 2020 with Mehdi Ben Cheikh | Succeeded by Samil Jemai; Khadija Krimi |
