= Eleanor Harvey =

Canadian Olympic fencer (born 1995)

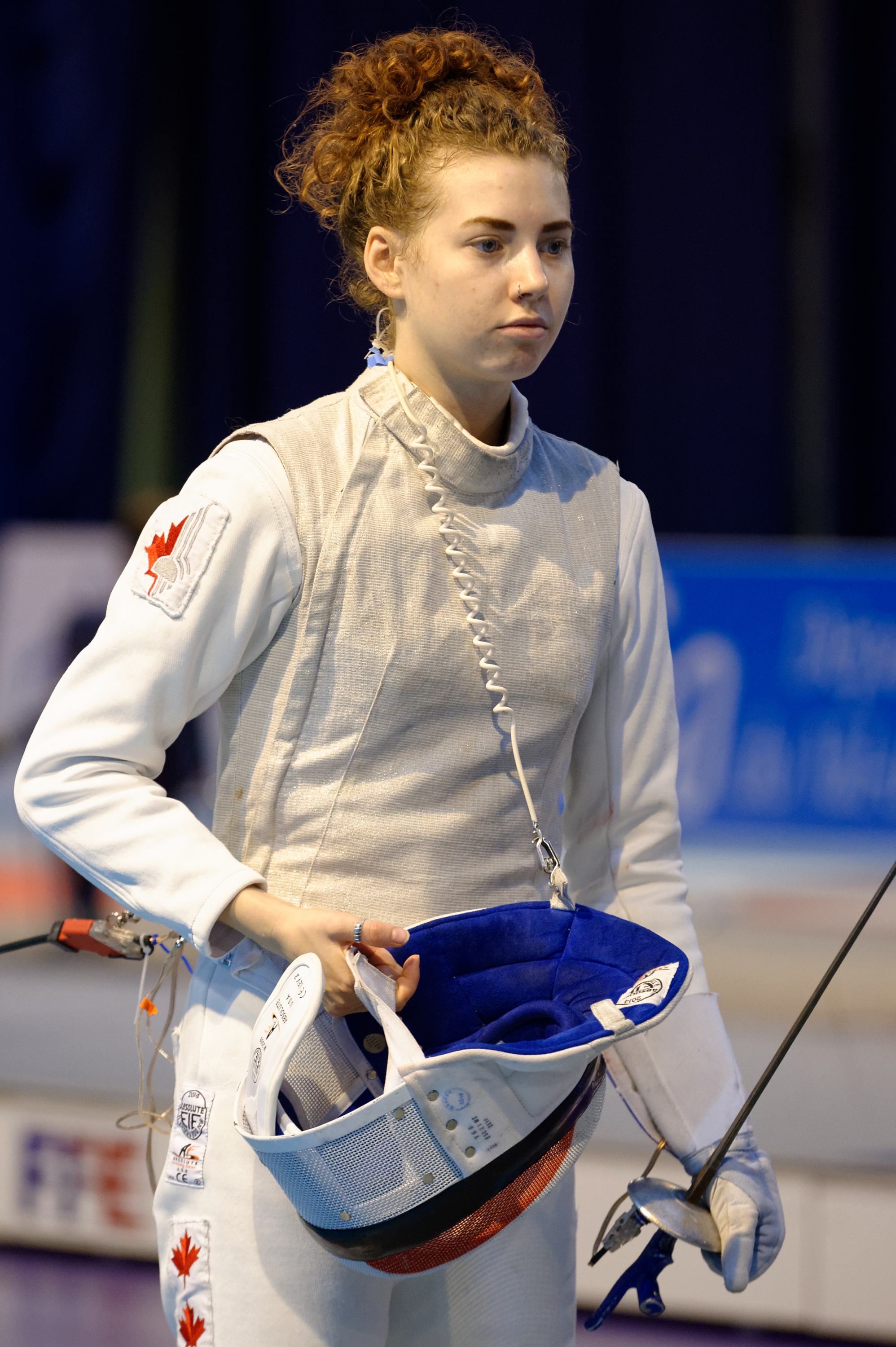
- Harvey in 2015

Personal information
- Nicknames: E.Harv, Yeleanor
- Nationality: Canadian
- Born: January 14, 1995 (age 31) Hamilton, Ontario
- Height: 172 cm (5 ft 8 in)
- Weight: 56 kg (123 lb)

Sport
- Country: Canada
- Sport: Fencing
- College team: Ohio State
- Club: Canadian Fencing Academy
- Coached by: Alex Martin, Alice Lu, Josh McGuire, Paul ApSimon
Medal record
Representing Canada
Olympic Games
Bronze medal – third place	2024 Paris	Individual foil
Pan American Games
Gold medal – first place	2015 Toronto	Team foil
Silver medal – second place	2019 Lima	Team foil
Silver medal – second place	2023 Santiago	Individual foil
Silver medal – second place	2023 Santiago	Team foil
Bronze medal – third place	2019 Lima	Individual foil
Bronze medal – third place	2019 Lima	Team sabre
Pan American Fencing Championships
Gold medal – first place	2022 Asunción	Individual foil
Gold medal – first place	2022 Asunción	Team foil
Gold medal – first place	2026 Lima	Individual foil
Silver medal – second place	2015 Santiago	Team foil
Silver medal – second place	2016 Panama City	Team foil
Silver medal – second place	2017 Montreal	Team foil
Silver medal – second place	2019 Toronto	Team foil
Silver medal – second place	2024 Lima	Individual foil
Silver medal – second place	2024 Lima	Team foil
Silver medal – second place	2025 Rio de Janeiro	Individual
Silver medal – second place	2025 Rio de Janeiro	Team
Silver medal – second place	2026 Lima	Team foil
Bronze medal – third place	2019 Toronto	Individual foil
Junior World Championships
Silver medal – second place	2014 Plovdiv	Individual foil
Silver medal – second place	2015 Tashkent	Individual foil
Pan American Junior Championships
Gold medal – first place	2013 Ponce	Individual foil
Gold medal – first place	2013 Ponce	Team foil
- Updated on 28 July 2024

Eleanor Grace Harvey (born January 14, 1995) is a Canadian foil fencer. She is a three-time Olympian and won the bronze medal in the individual foil event at the 2024 Summer Olympics. Harvey is also a Pan American Games champion, a two-time Pan American Fencing champion, a two-time Junior World Championships silver medalist and a two-time Pan American Junior champion.

== Early life ==
Harvey became interested in becoming an Olympian while watching the 2000 Sydney Games. She began training for long distance running before turning to karate at eight years old. She trained karate for two years before finding out that karate was not an Olympic sport at that time. Harvey changed to practicing fencing after a family friend heard a radio interview with Sherraine Schalm and suggested the sport.

== Career ==
Harvey qualified to represent Canada at the 2016 Summer Olympics by being ranked in the top two in the Americas outside the top 14 rankings. Harvey competed in the women's foil event and defeated world number one Arianna Errigo to reach the quarterfinals. She finished in seventh place, the highest finish for a Canadian fencer in Olympic history at the time. Harvey represented Canada at the 2020 Summer Olympics and competed in the women's foil event, where she reached the round of 16 before being eliminated by eventual gold medalist Lee Kiefer, and the women's team foil event, where Canada placed fifth.

At the 2024 Summer Olympics, Harvey won Canada's first Olympic medal in fencing after defeating Alice Volpi in the bronze medal match in the individual foil event. She also competed in the women's team foil event, where Canada finished in fourth place after losing the bronze medal match to Japan.

== Medal record ==
=== Olympic Games ===
Year	Location	Event	Position
2024	Paris, France	Individual Women's Foil	3rd

== See also ==
- List of Canadian sports personalities
- List of NCAA fencing champions
