= Martyna Jelińska =

Polish fencer (born 1992)

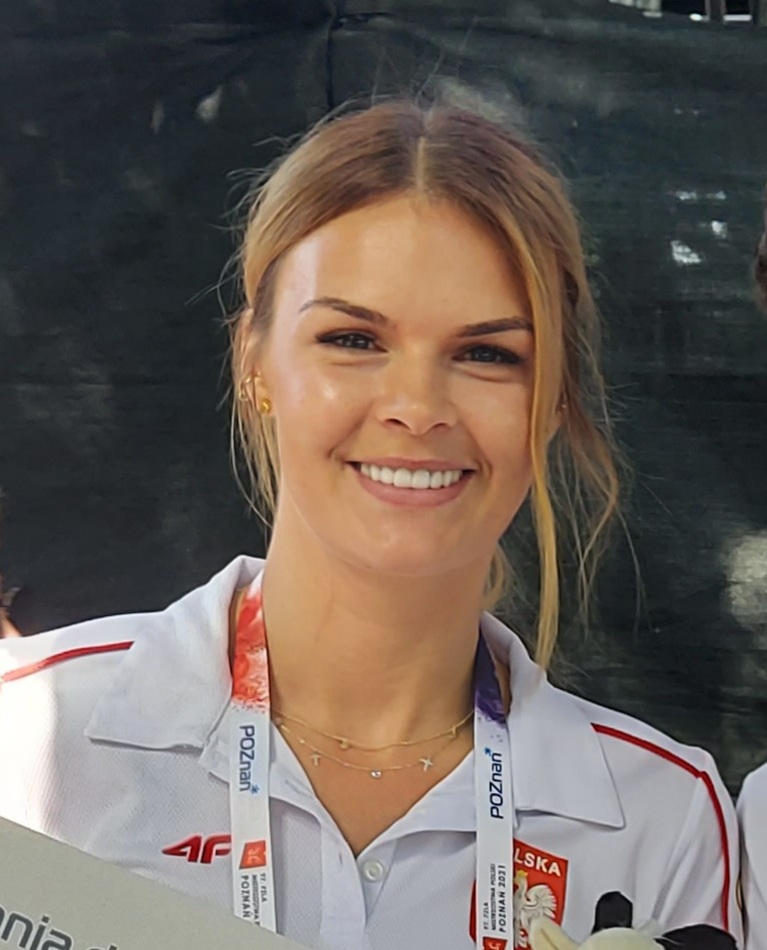

Personal information
- Nationality: Polish
- Born: 5 May 1992 (age 34) Toruń, Poland

Sport
- Sport: Fencing
Medal record
Women's foil
Representing Poland
European Championships
Silver medal – second place	2024 Basel	Team
Summer Universiade
Bronze medal – third place	2017 Taipei	Team

Martyna Jelińska (born 5 May 1992) is a Polish fencer. She competed in the women's foil event at the 2020 Summer Olympics. In 2017, she won the bronze medal in the women's team foil event at the 2017 Summer Universiade held in Taipei, Taiwan. She also competed in the women's individual foil event.
