= Macau at the 2017 Summer Universiade =

- IOC code: MAC
- NOC: Sports and Olympic Committee of Macau, China
- Website: www.macauolympic.org

in Taipei, Taiwan 19 – 30 July 2017
- Competitors: 47 in 8 sports
- Medals Ranked 32nd: Gold 2 Silver 0 Bronze 0 Total 2

Summer Universiade appearances
- 1959; 1961; 1963; 1965; 1967; 1970; 1973; 1975; 1977; 1979; 1981; 1983; 1985; 1987; 1989; 1991; 1993; 1995; 1997; 1999; 2001; 2003; 2005; 2007; 2009; 2011; 2013; 2015; 2017; 2019; 2021; 2025; 2027

Macau participated at the 2017 Summer Universiade, in Taipei, Taiwan.

== Medal summary ==
=== Medal by sports ===
Medals by sport
| Sport | 1st place, gold medalist(s) | 2nd place, silver medalist(s) | 3rd place, bronze medalist(s) | Total |
|---|---|---|---|---|
| Wushu | 2 | 0 | 0 | 2 |
| Total | 2 | 0 | 0 | 2 |

== Medalists ==
=== Official Sports ===
| Medal | Athlete(s) | Sport | Event | Date |
|---|---|---|---|---|
| Gold | Li Yi | Wushu | Women's Taolu Changquan | 27 Aug |
| Gold | Li Yi | Wushu | Women's Taolu Jianshu & Qiangshu | 29 Aug |
