= Mălina Călugăreanu =

Romanian fencer (born 1996)

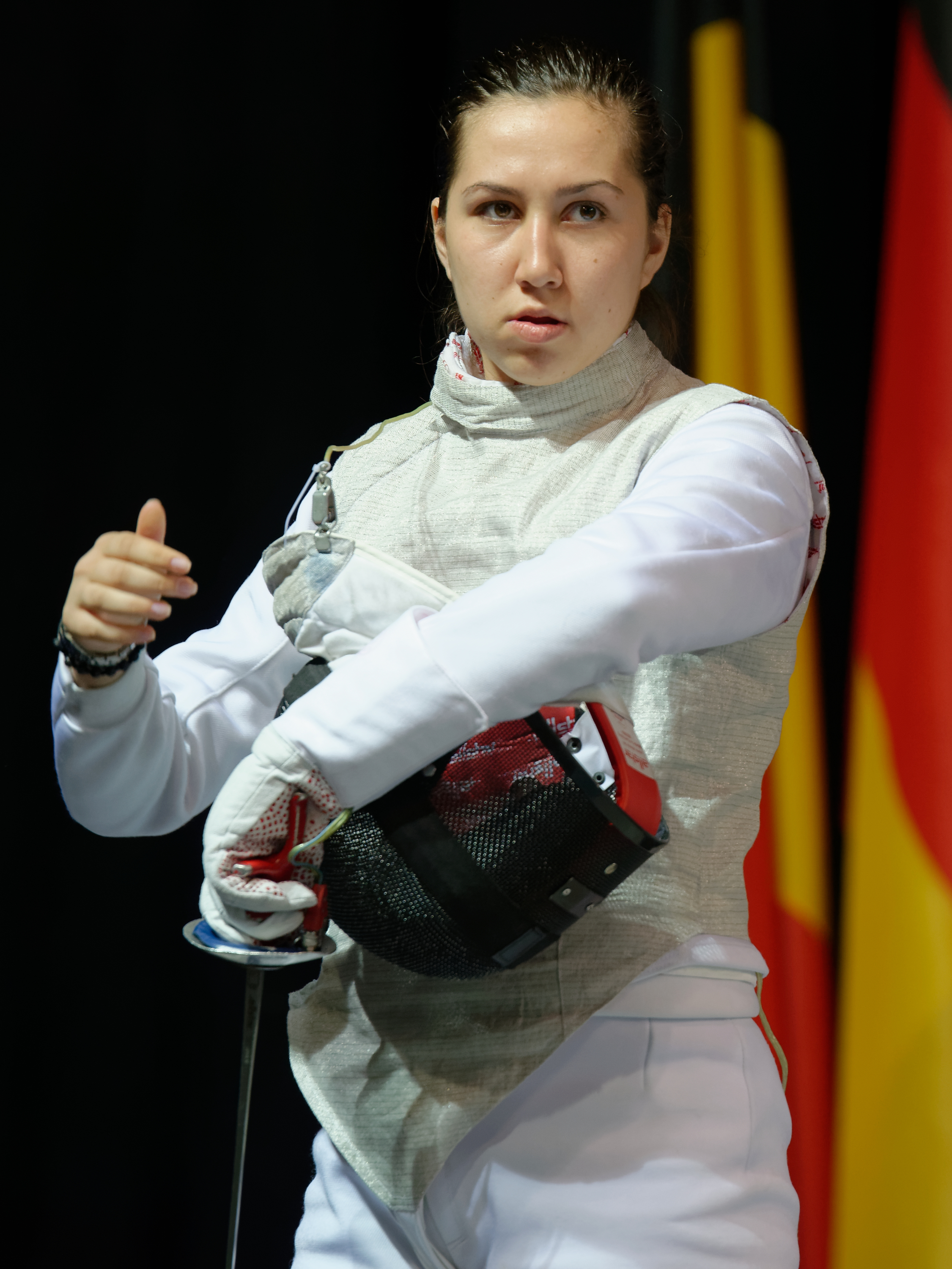

Personal information
- Born: 15 September 1996 (age 29) Bucharest, Romania

Fencing career
- Sport: Fencing
- Country: Romania
- Weapon: sabre
- Hand: left-handed
- National coach: Petre Ducu
- Club: CSA Steaua
- Head coach: Petre Ducu; Florin Gheorghe
- FIE ranking: current ranking
Medal record
Women's foil
Representing Romania
European Games
Bronze medal – third place	2023 Kraków–Małopolska	Individual

Mălina Călugăreanu (born 15 September 1996, Bucharest) is a Romanian foil fencer.

== Career ==
Călugăreanu took up fencing at the age of twelve under the guiding of Petre Ducu and Florin Gheorghe, who remain her coaches as of 2016. She won her first junior World Cup tournament in 2014 in Timișoara, ending the 2014–15 season with a No. 1 position in World junior rankings.

She took part in her first senior competitions during the 2011–12 season and she joined the senior Romanian national team for the 2013 European Championships in Zagreb. In 2014, she won the silver medal at the Romanian championships, after losing in the final to Steaua teammate Maria Boldor. They went on to win the team gold medal together. The same happened in 2015.

In the 2015–16 season she earned a silver medal at the World Cup satellite tournament in Ankara. In April she qualified to the Fencing at the 2016 Summer Olympics through a top-four finish at the Prague pre-olympic tournament.

She competed at the 2022 World Fencing Championships held in Cairo, Egypt.
