= Adelina Zagidullina =

Russian foil fencer

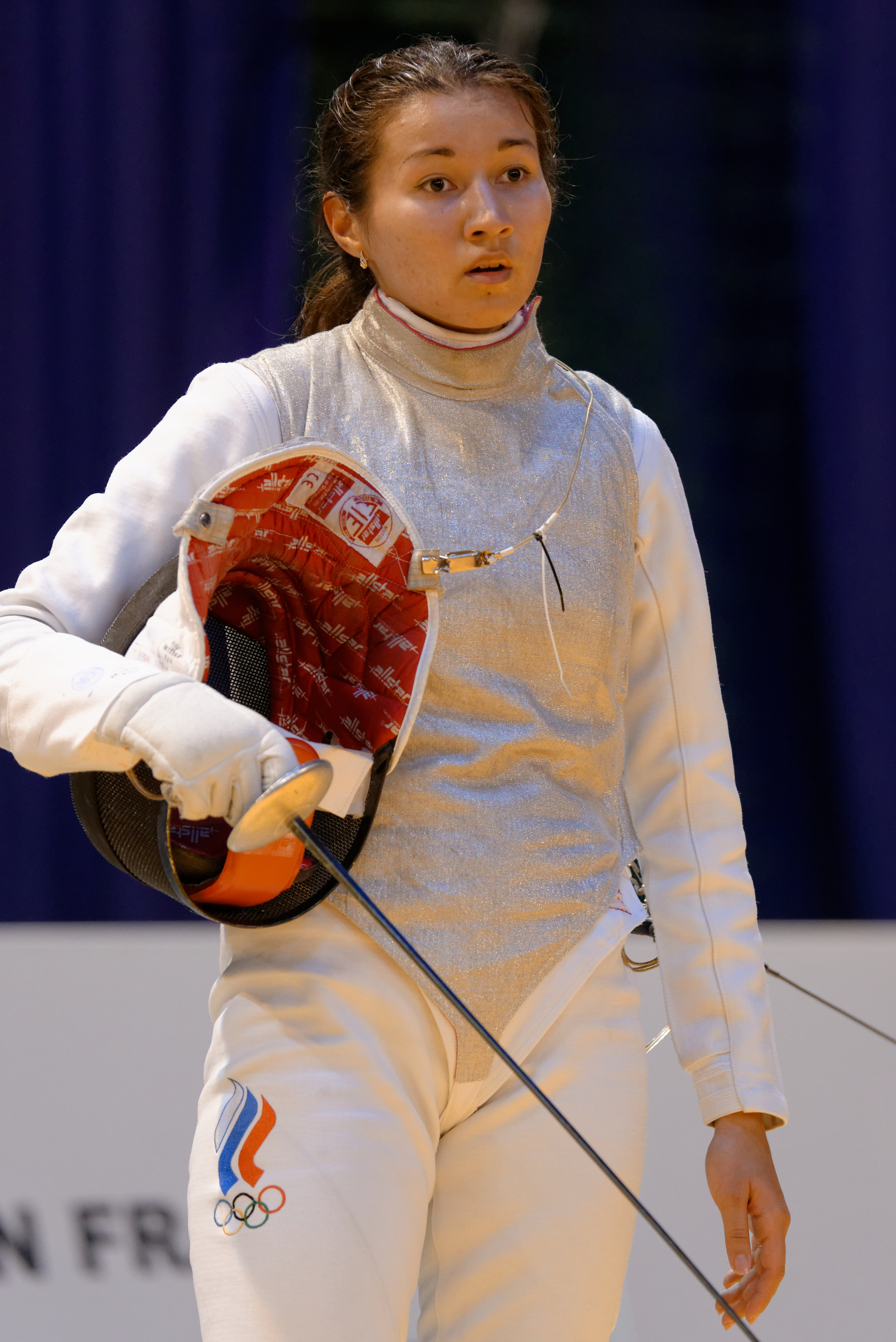
- Zagidullina at the Saint-Maur Women's Foil World Cup in 2014

Personal information
- Full name: Adelina Rustemovna Zagidullina
- Nationality: (Russia) Russian
- Born: 13 January 1993 (age 33) Ufa, Bashkortostan, Russia
- Height: 1.68 m (5 ft 6 in)
- Weight: 56 kg (123 lb)

Fencing career
- Sport: Fencing
- Country: Russia
- Weapon: Foil
- Hand: right-handed
- National coach: E.A. Popov, O.M. Shagaeva
- Club: Central Sports Army Club [RUS]; Ufa Fencing Sports School of Olympic Reserve [RUS]
- FIE ranking: current ranking
Medal record
Representing (Russia) ROC
Olympic Games
Gold medal – first place	2020 Tokyo	Team foil
Representing Russia
World Championships
Gold medal – first place	2016 Rio de Janeiro	Team foil
Gold medal – first place	2019 Budapest	Team foil
Bronze medal – third place	2017 Leipzig	Team foil
European Championships
Gold medal – first place	2016 Toruń	Team foil
Gold medal – first place	2019 Düsseldorf	Team foil
Silver medal – second place	2017 Tbilisi	Team foil
European Games
Gold medal – first place	2015 Baku	Team foil
Bronze medal – third place	2015 Baku	Individual foil
Military World Games
Gold medal – first place	2019 Wuhan	Team foil

Adelina Rustemovna Zagidullina (Russian: Аделина Рустемовна Загидуллина, IPA: [ɐdʲɪˈlʲinə zəɡʲɪˈdulʲɪnə], born 13 January 1993) is a Russian right-handed foil fencer of Tatar origin. She is the two-time team European champion, two-time team world champion and 2021 team Olympic champion. Zagidullina has been trained by her coach Egor Popov since 2007, whom she married in 2012. She is a Russian Armed Forces athlete, and her clubs are the Central Sports Army Club [RUS], and the Ufa Fencing Sports School of Olympic Reserve [RUS].

== Medal record ==
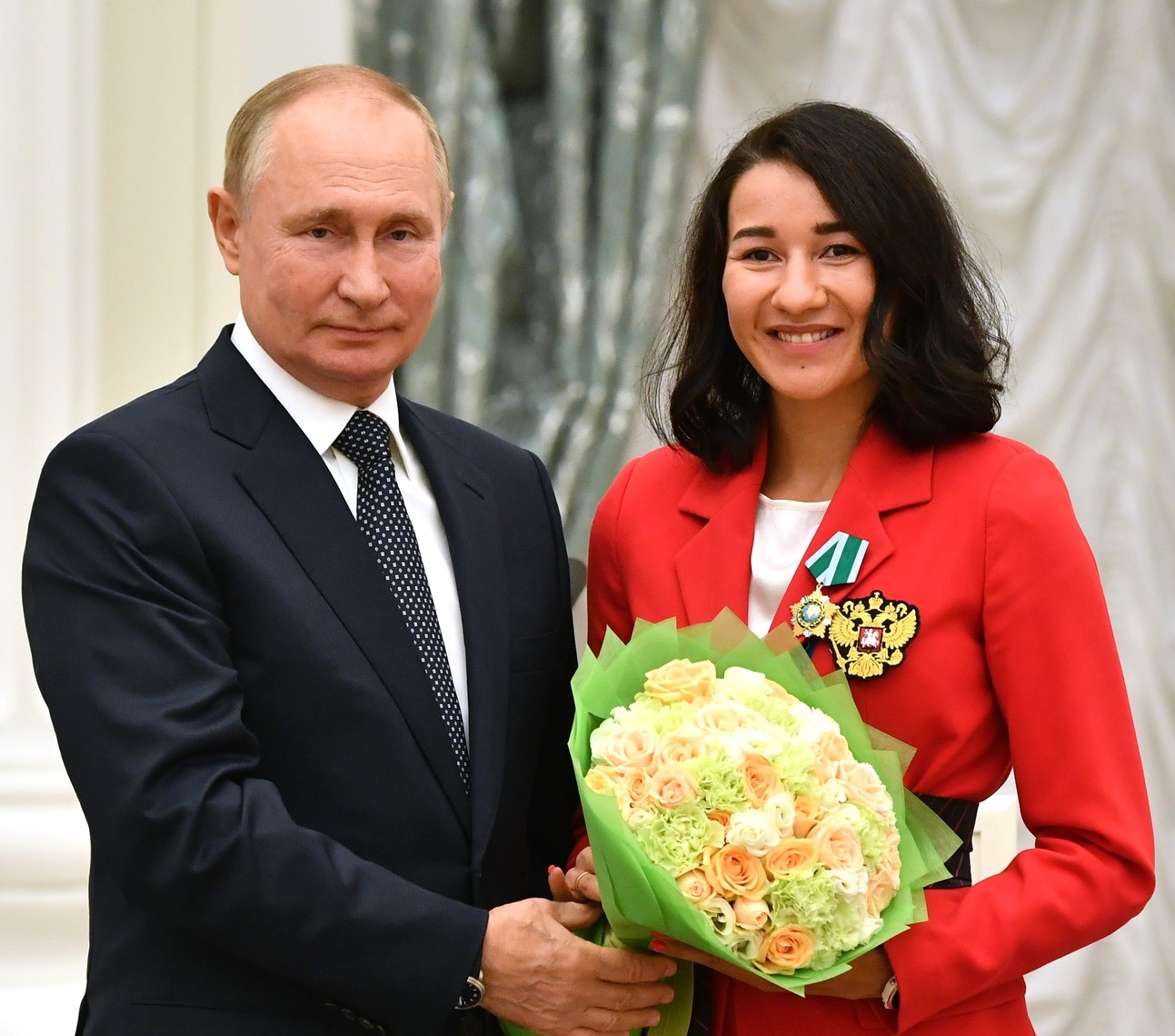
Vladimir Putin and Zagidullina in 2021

=== Olympic Games ===
Year	Location	Event	Position
2021	Tokyo, Japan	Team Women's Foil	1st

=== World Championship ===
Year	Location	Event	Position
2016	Rio de Janeiro, Brazil	Team Women's Foil	1st
2017	Leipzig, Germany	Team Women's Foil	3rd
2019	Budapest, Hungary	Team Women's Foil	1st

=== European Championship ===
Year	Location	Event	Position
2016	Toruń, Poland	Team Women's Foil	1st
2017	(Georgia (country)) Tbilisi, Georgia	Team Women's Foil	2nd
2019	Düsseldorf, Germany	Team Women's Foil	1st

=== Grand Prix ===
Date	Location	Event	Position
11/28/2014	Turin, Italy	Individual Women's Foil	3rd
11/27/2015	Turin, Italy	Individual Women's Foil	3rd

=== World Cup ===
Date	Location	Event	Position
02/21/2020	Kazan, Russia	Individual Women's Foil	3rd
