= Flóra Pásztor =

Hungarian fencer (born 1998)

Personal information
- Born: 30 June 1998 (age 28) Budapest, Hungary

Fencing career
- Sport: Fencing
- Country: Hungary
Medal record
Women's foil
Representing Hungary
European Games
Silver medal – second place	2023 Kraków–Małopolska	Individual
European Championships
Bronze medal – third place	2024 Basel	Team
Bronze medal – third place	2025 Genoa	Individual

Flóra Pásztor (born 30 June 1998) is a Hungarian fencer. She competed in the women's foil event at the 2020 Summer Olympics in Tokyo, Japan.

She competed at the 2022 World Fencing Championships held in Cairo, Egypt.
