= Alice Volpi =

Italian fencer (born 1992)

Alice Volpi Nunes da Silva
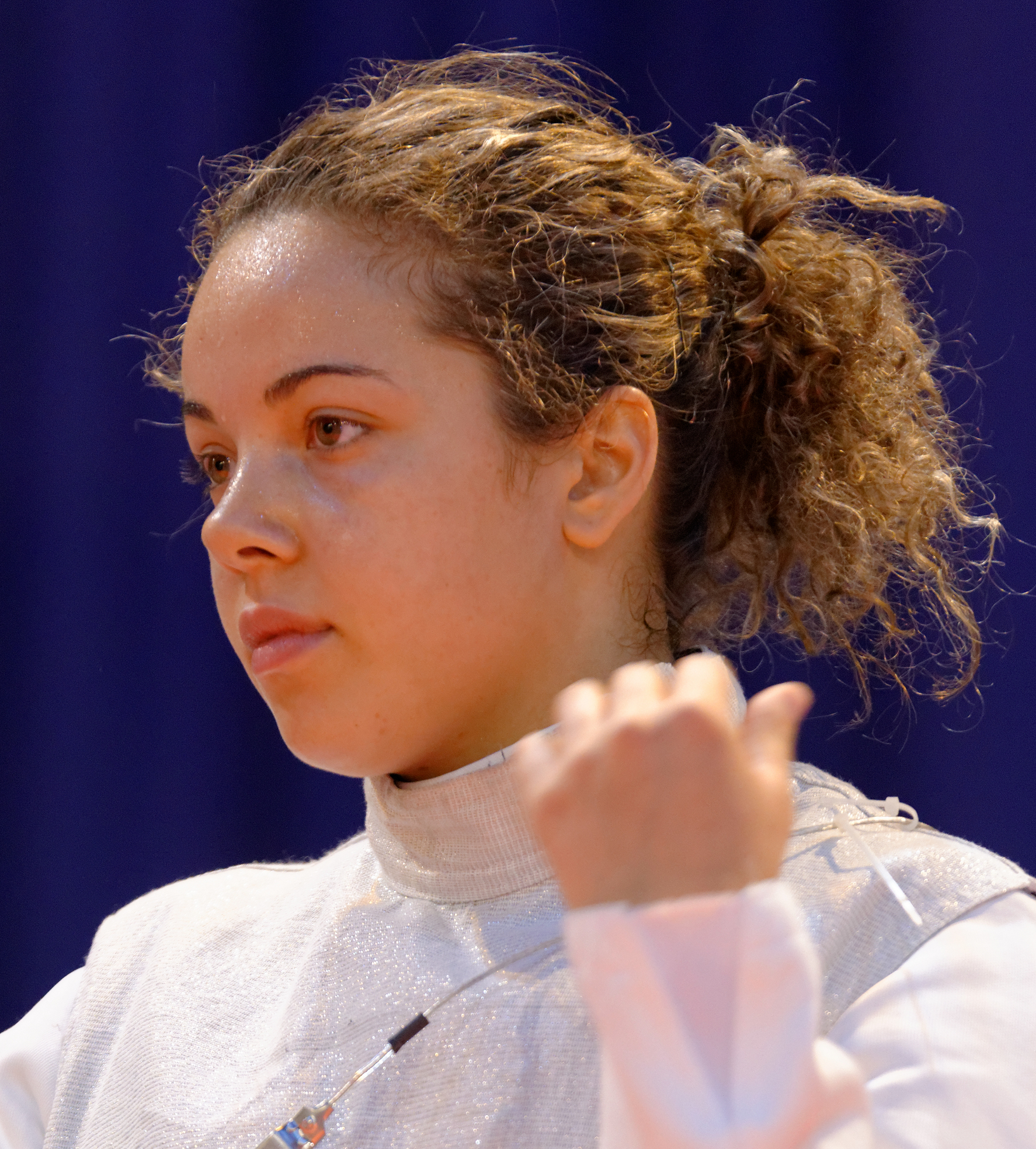
- Volpi in 2014

Personal information
- Born: 15 April 1992 (age 34) Siena, Italy
- Height: 1.77 m (5 ft 10 in)
- Weight: 64 kg (141 lb)

Fencing career
- Sport: Fencing
- Country: Italy
- Weapon: Foil
- Hand: right-handed
- Club: Fiamme Oro
- FIE ranking: current ranking
Medal record
Women's foil
Representing Italy
Olympic Games
Silver medal – second place	2024 Paris	Team
Bronze medal – third place	2020 Tokyo	Team
World Championships
Gold medal – first place	2017 Leipzig	Team
Gold medal – first place	2018 Wuxi	Individual
Gold medal – first place	2022 Cairo	Team
Gold medal – first place	2023 Milan	Individual
Gold medal – first place	2023 Milan	Team
Silver medal – second place	2017 Leipzig	Individual
Silver medal – second place	2018 Wuxi	Team
Silver medal – second place	2019 Budapest	Team
Bronze medal – third place	2025 Tbilisi	Team
European Games
Gold medal – first place	2015 Baku	Individual
Gold medal – first place	2023 Kraków–Małopolska	Team
Bronze medal – third place	2015 Baku	Team
European Championships
Gold medal – first place	2017 Tbilisi	Team
Gold medal – first place	2018 Novi Sad	Team
Gold medal – first place	2022 Antalya	Team
Gold medal – first place	2023 Kraków	Team
Gold medal – first place	2024 Basel	Team
Gold medal – first place	2025 Genoa	Team
Silver medal – second place	2016 Toruń	Team
Bronze medal – third place	2017 Tbilisi	Individual
Bronze medal – third place	2018 Novi Sad	Individual
Bronze medal – third place	2019 Düsseldorf	Individual
Bronze medal – third place	2019 Düsseldorf	Team
Bronze medal – third place	2022 Antalya	Individual
Bronze medal – third place	2023 Plovdiv	Individual

Alice Volpi (born 15 April 1992) is an Italian right-handed foil fencer, two-time team European champion, 2017 team world champion, 2018 and 2023 individual world champion, and 2020 team Olympic bronze medalist.

== Biography ==
Born to a father from Siena, Paolo, and a Brazilian mother, Waléria Nunes da Silva, originally from Rio de Janeiro, Volpi was raised at the Fencing Section of the University Sports Centre of Siena under the guidance of Maestro Daniele Giannini. She is now part of the sports group of the State Police "Fiamme Oro".

== Medal record ==
=== Olympic Games ===
Year	Location	Event	Position
2021	Tokyo, Japan	Team Women's Foil	3rd
2024	Paris, France	Team Women's Foil	2nd

=== World Championship ===
Year	Location	Event	Position
2017	Leipzig, Germany	Individual Women's Foil	2nd
2017	Leipzig, Germany	Team Women's Foil	1st
2018	Wuxi, China	Individual Women's Foil	1st
2018	Wuxi, China	Team Women's Foil	2nd
2019	Budapest, Hungary	Team Women's Foil	2nd
2022	Cairo, Egypt	Team Women's Foil	1st
2023	Milan, Italy	Individual Women's Foil	1st
2023	Milan, Italy	Team Women's Foil	1st
2025	(Georgia (country)) Tbilisi, Georgia	Team Women's Foil	3rd

=== European Championship ===
Year	Location	Event	Position
2016	Toruń, Poland	Team Women's Foil	2nd
2017	(Georgia (country)) Tbilisi, Georgia	Individual Women's Foil	3rd
2017	(Georgia (country)) Tbilisi, Georgia	Team Women's Foil	1st
2018	Novi Sad, Serbia	Individual Women's Foil	3rd
2018	Novi Sad, Serbia	Team Women's Foil	1st
2019	Düsseldorf, Germany	Individual Women's Foil	3rd
2019	Düsseldorf, Germany	Team Women's Foil	3rd

=== Grand Prix ===
Date	Location	Event	Position
2015-05-15	Shanghai, China	Individual Women's Foil	3rd
2015-11-27	Turin, Italy	Individual Women's Foil	1st
2016-12-02	Turin, Italy	Individual Women's Foil	3rd
2017-12-01	Turin, Italy	Individual Women's Foil	2nd
2019-02-08	Turin, Italy	Individual Women's Foil	1st
2019-03-16	(United States) Anaheim, California	Individual Women's Foil	2nd
2019-05-17	Shanghai, China	Individual Women's Foil	2nd
2020-02-07	Turin, Italy	Individual Women's Foil	3rd
2022-05-14	Incheon, South Korea	Individual Women's Foil	3rd

=== World Cup ===
Date	Location	Event	Position
2012-05-04	Shanghai, China	Individual Women's Foil	2nd
2014-02-07	Budapest, Hungary	Individual Women's Foil	2nd
2015-10-16	Cancún, Mexico	Individual Women's Foil	2nd
2017-01-13	Algier, Algeria	Individual Women's Foil	3rd
2017-10-13	Cancún, Mexico	Individual Women's Foil	2nd
2017-11-03	Saint-Maur-des-Fossés, France	Individual Women's Foil	2nd
2018-02-02	Algier, Algeria	Individual Women's Foil	1st
2019-01-25	Saint-Maur-des-Fossés, France	Individual Women's Foil	2nd
2019-03-01	Cairo, Egypt	Individual Women's Foil	2nd
2019-12-13	Saint-Maur-des-Fossés, France	Individual Women's Foil	1st
2020-02-21	Kazan, Russia	Individual Women's Foil	3rd
2021-12-10	Saint-Maur-des-Fossés, France	Individual Women's Foil	1st
2022-01-14	Poznań, Poland	Individual Women's Foil	1st
2022-02-25	Guadalajara, Mexico	Individual Women's Foil	1st
