= Anita Blaze =

French fencer (born 1991)

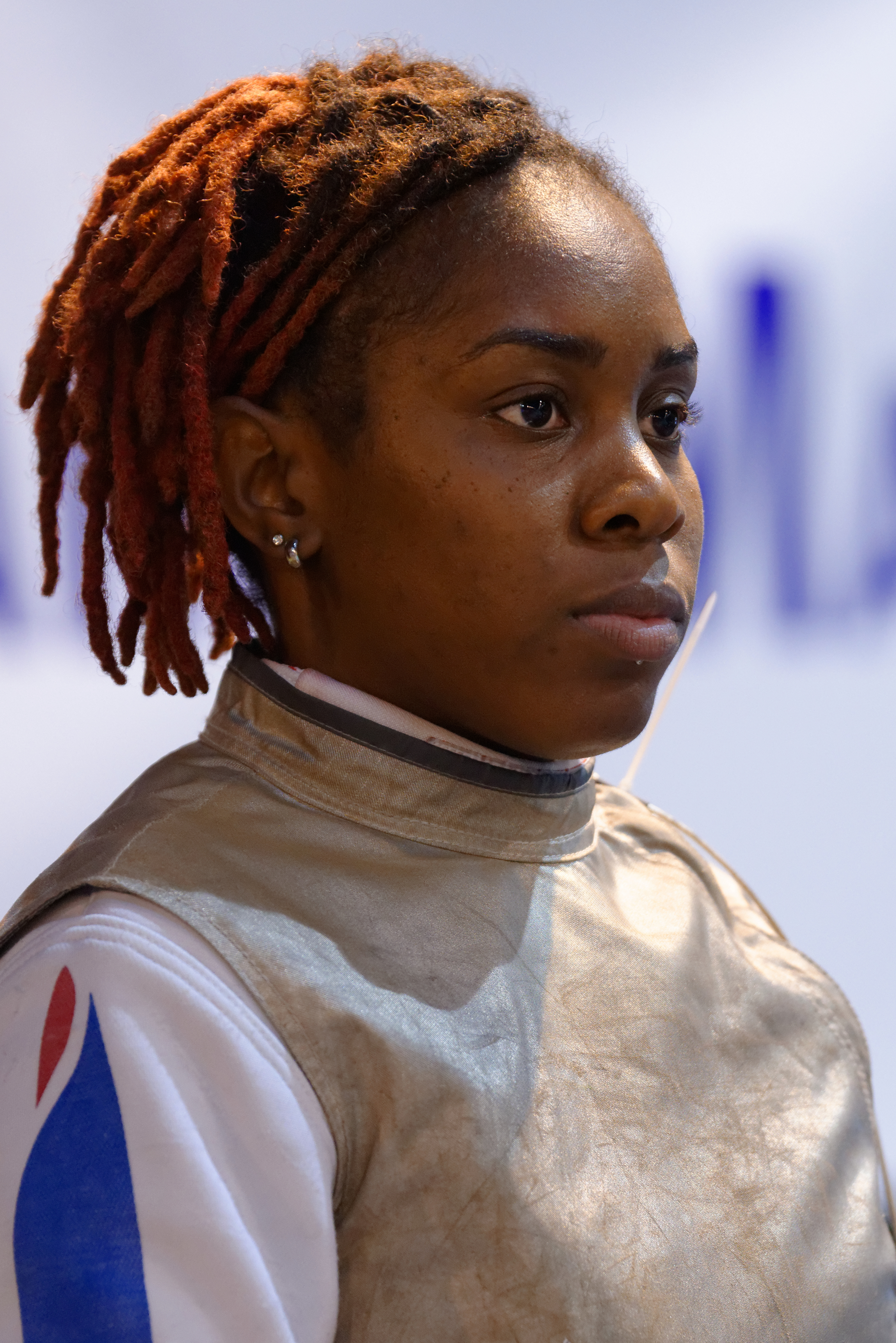
- Blaze in 2014

Personal information
- Nationality: French
- Born: 29 October 1991 (age 34) Baie-Mahault, France
- Height: 1.68 m (5 ft 6 in)
- Weight: 52 kg (115 lb)

Fencing career
- Sport: Fencing
- Country: France
- Weapon: Foil
- Hand: Right-handed
- Club: CM Aubervilliers
- FIE ranking: current ranking
Medal record
Women's foil
Representing France
Olympic Games
Silver medal – second place	2020 Tokyo	Team
World Championships
Silver medal – second place	2013 Budapest	Team
Silver medal – second place	2025 Tbilisi	Team
Bronze medal – third place	2015 Moscow	Team
Bronze medal – third place	2018 Wuxi	Team
Bronze medal – third place	2022 Cairo	Team
European Games
Silver medal – second place	2023 Kraków–Małopolska	Team
European Championships
Silver medal – second place	2012 Legnano	Team
Silver medal – second place	2013 Zagreb	Team
Silver medal – second place	2019 Düsseldorf	Team
Silver medal – second place	2022 Antalya	Team
Silver medal – second place	2023 Kraków	Team
Silver medal – second place	2025 Genoa	Team
Silver medal – second place	2026 Antony	Team
Bronze medal – third place	2015 Montreux	Team
Bronze medal – third place	2018 Novi Sad	Team
Military World Games
Bronze medal – third place	2019 Wuhan	Individual

Anita Blaze (born 29 October 1991) is a French right-handed foil fencer, two-time Olympian, and 2021 team Olympic silver medalist. Blaze competed in the 2012 London Olympic Games and the 2021 Tokyo Olympic Games.

== Career ==
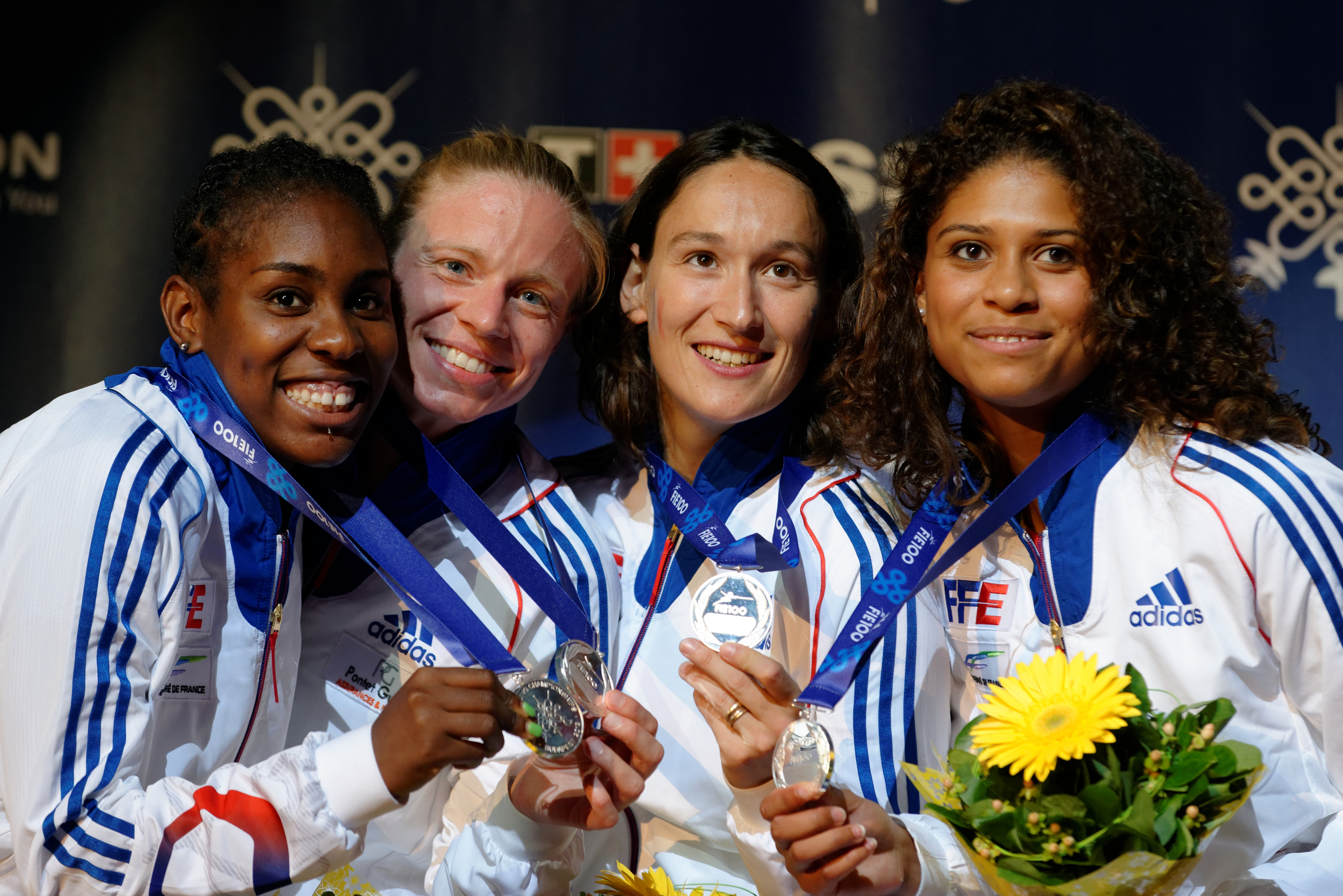
Blaze (left) with Team France at the 2013 World Fencing Championships

Blaze was born in Guadeloupe, an overseas region of France. She took up fencing at the age of four and learnt the sport in the club of Petit-Bourg. She quickly showed talent and was selected into a centre for promising athletes in metropolitan France. She won a team silver medal in the 2008 Cadet European Championships in Rovigo and an individual silver medal in the 2010 Junior World Championships in Baku.

She joined the French senior national team, with whom she earned a team silver medal in the 2012 European Championships in Legnano. She competed in the 2012 Summer Olympics in London as first reserve. After defeating Poland in the quarter-finals, France were routed 45–22 by Italy, whose team comprised all three individual Olympic medallists. France met South Korea in the final for the bronze medal. Blaze managed to reduce the 12-hit advantage acquired early by Korea, but France lost eventually 32 to 45.

In the 2012–13 season Blaze reached the quarter-finals in the Budapest Grand Prix and earned a double silver medal in the French national championship. She finished 30th in the Fencing World Cup, a career best as of 2014. She took another team silver medal at the 2013 European Championships in Zagreb, after France was again defeated by Italy. History repeated itself at the World Championships a month later in Budapest: France met Italy in the final and lost heavily 45–18, coming home with a silver medal. In the 2013–14 season Blaze reached the quarter-finals in the Tauberbischofsheim Grand Prix, but otherwise disappointing results and a calf strain caused her to be dropped from the French team that won bronze medals in the European Championships and the World Championships.

In the 2014–15 season Blaze climbed the first World Cup podium in her career with a bronze medal in the Torino Grand Prix, after she was defeated in the semi-final by twice World champion Arianna Errigo.

== Medal record ==
=== Olympic Games ===
Year	Location	Event	Position
2021	Tokyo, Japan	Team Women's Foil	2nd

=== World Championship ===
Year	Location	Event	Position
2013	Budapest, Hungary	Team Women's Foil	2nd
2015	Moscow, Russia	Team Women's Foil	3rd
2018	Wuxi, China	Team Women's Foil	3rd
2025	(Georgia (country)) Tbilisi, Georgia	Team Women's Foil	2nd

=== European Championship ===
Year	Location	Event	Position
2012	Legnano, Italy	Team Women's Foil	2nd
2013	Zagreb, Croatia	Team Women's Foil	2nd
2015	Montreux, Switzerland	Team Women's Foil	3rd
2018	Novi Sad, Serbia	Team Women's Foil	3rd
2019	Düsseldorf, Germany	Team Women's Foil	2nd

=== Grand Prix ===
Date	Location	Event	Position
2014-11-28	Turin, Italy	Individual Women's Foil	3rd

=== World Cup ===
Date	Location	Event	Position
2022-04-29	Tauberbischofsheim, Germany	Individual Women's Foil	2nd
