= Rio Azuma =

Japanese fencer

Personal information
- Nationality: Japanese
- Born: 27 July 1998 (age 28) Wakayama, Wakayama, Japan

Fencing career
- Sport: Fencing
- Weapon: Foil
- Hand: Right-handed

Rio Azuma (born 27 July 1998) is a Japanese fencer. She represented Japan in the women's team foil event at the 2020 Summer Olympics.

== Biography ==
Azuma began fencing in the fifth year of primary school, after visiting a fencing club with her mother Miki, who had previously competed in the sport at junior level. She initially trained once a week, before attending more frequently with her younger sister, Sera Azuma. Before taking up fencing, the sisters had practised karate for approximately two years. Rio attended Nippon Sport Science University.

Azuma won the junior-high-school division of Japan's national youth fencing championships in 2012. She won the 2016 Inter-High championship and was runner-up in women's individual foil at the Japanese national championships that year. She finished fifth in team foil at the 2018 Junior World Fencing Championships.

In December 2019, Azuma won a team bronze medal at the women's foil World Cup in Saint-Maur, France, alongside Sera Azuma, Sumire Tsuji and Minami Kano. Japan defeated Hungary 45–32 in the bronze-medal match. It was the Japanese women's foil team's first World Cup medal since 2007.

At the 2020 Summer Olympics in Tokyo, Azuma competed in the women's individual and team foil events. She finished 24th in the individual competition and sixth with the Japanese team.
