= Julia Walczyk-Klimaszyk =

Polish fencer (born 1997)

Personal information
- Born: 28 October 1997 (age 28)
- Website: https://juliawalczykklimaszyk.com

Fencing career
- Sport: Fencing
- Country: Poland
- Hand: Right-handed
Medal record
Women's foil
Representing Poland
European Games
| Gold medal – first place | 2023 Kraków–Małopolska | Individual |
European Championships
| Silver medal – second place | 2024 Basel | Team |
| Bronze medal – third place | 2024 Basel | Individual |
Summer Universiade
| Bronze medal – third place | 2017 Taipei | Team |
Military World Games
| Bronze medal – third place | 2019 Wuhan | Individual |
| Bronze medal – third place | 2019 Wuhan | Team |
Junior World Championships
| Bronze medal – third place | 2015 Tashkent | Team |

Julia Walczyk-Klimaszyk (born 28 October 1997) is a Polish fencer.

== Career ==
In 2015, she won the bronze medal in the women's team foil event at the Junior World Fencing Championships held in Tashkent, Uzbekistan. That same year, she represented Poland at the 2015 European Games in Baku, Azerbaijan, competing in the women's foil event where she was eliminated by Natalia Sheppard of Great Britain.

In 2017, she won the gold medal in the junior women's team foil event at the Junior and Cadet World Fencing Championships in Plovdiv, Bulgaria. In the same year, she also won the bronze medal in the women's team foil event at the 2017 Summer Universiade held in Taipei, Taiwan and competed in the women's individual foil event. In 2019, she won one of the bronze medals in the women's foil event at the Military World Games held in Wuhan, China and also won the bronze medal in the women's team event, alongside Bogna Jóźwiak, Hanna Łyczbińska and Martyna Synoradzka.

She went on to compete at the 2022 European Fencing Championships held in Antalya, Turkey and the 2022 World Fencing Championships held in Cairo, Egypt.
