= Kata Kondricz =

Hungarian fencer (born 1998)

Personal information
- Born: 16 July 1998 (age 28)

Fencing career
- Sport: Fencing
- Country: Hungary
Medal record
Women's foil
Representing Hungary
European Championships
Bronze medal – third place	2024 Basel	Team

Kata Kondricz (born 16 July 1998) is a Hungarian foil fencer. She competed in the women's foil event at the 2020 Summer Olympics in Tokyo, Japan.

She competed at the 2022 European Fencing Championships held in Antalya, Turkey.
