= Fanni Kreiss =

Hungarian fencer

Personal information
- Born: 12 April 1989 (age 37)

Fencing career
- Sport: Fencing
- Country: Hungary

Fanni Kreiss (born 12 April 1989) is a Hungarian fencer. She competed in the women's foil event at the 2020 Summer Olympics in Tokyo, Japan.
