= Hanna Łyczbińska =

Polish foil fencer (born 1990)

Personal information
- Nationality: Polish
- Born: 20 April 1990 (age 36) Toruń, Poland
- Height: 1.78 m (5 ft 10 in)
- Weight: 64 kg (141 lb)

Sport
- Country: Poland
- Sport: Fencing
Medal record
Women's foil
Representing Poland
European Championships
Silver medal – second place	2024 Basel	Team
Military World Games
Bronze medal – third place	2019 Wuhan	Team

Hanna Łyczbińska (born 20 April 1990) is a Polish foil fencer. She represented her country at the 2016 Summer Olympics.

In 2019, she won the bronze medal in the women's team event at the Military World Games held in Wuhan, China.

She competed at the 2022 European Fencing Championships held in Antalya, Turkey.
