= Women's foil at the 2026 World Fencing Championships =

- Venue: AsiaWorld–Expo
- Location: Hong Kong
- Dates: 24 July (preliminaries); 27 July (finals)
- Competitors: 132 from 51 nations

Medalists
gold medal	Martina Favaretto	Italy
silver medal	Arianna Errigo	Italy
bronze medal	Yuka Ueno	Japan
bronze medal	Alina Poloziuk	Ukraine

The Women's foil competition at the 2026 World Fencing Championships was held on 24 and 27 July 2026.

== Draw ==
=== Finals ===
Semifinals
(Italy) Martina Favaretto	14
(Japan) Yuka Ueno	11
(Italy) Arianna Errigo	15
(Ukraine) Alina Poloziuk	7

Final
(Italy) Martina Favaretto	15
(Italy) Arianna Errigo	7

=== Top half ===
==== Section 1 ====
Round of 64
(Italy) Martina Favaretto	15
(United Kingdom) Amelie Tsang	5
(Russia) Aila Mamedova	15
(Poland) Marta Jakubowska	13
(Canada) Jessica Guo	15
(Philippines) Samantha Catantan	8
(Poland) Julia Walczyk-Klimaszyk	14
(France) Éva Lacheray	12
(Japan) Komaki Kikuchi	15
(Brazil) Bia Bulcão	6
(Uzbekistan) Polina Volobueva	15
(Slovakia) Gaia Cantucci	9
(China) Song Yue	5
(Canada) Nadia Hayes	11
(Hungary) Jázmin Papp	8
(Canada) Eleanor Harvey	15

Round of 32
(Italy) Martina Favaretto	15
(Russia) Aila Mamedova	4
(Canada) Jessica Guo	15
(Poland) Julia Walczyk-Klimaszyk	6
(Japan) Komaki Kikuchi	15
(Uzbekistan) Polina Volobueva	9
(Canada) Nadia Hayes	15
(Canada) Eleanor Harvey	7

Round of 16
(Italy) Martina Favaretto	15
(Canada) Jessica Guo	4
(Japan) Komaki Kikuchi	11
(Canada) Nadia Hayes	15

Quarterfinals
(Italy) Martina Favaretto	15
(Canada) Nadia Hayes	3

==== Section 2 ====
Round of 64
(United States) Lauren Scruggs	15
(Venezuela) Anabella Acurero	3
(South Korea) Sim So-eun	12
(Russia) Anna Soloveva	13
(South Korea) Mo Byeol-i	14
(Hong Kong) Daphne Chan	15
(Singapore) Maxine Wong	10
(United States) Carolina Stutchbury	11
(Japan) Sumire Tsuji	10
(United States) Jaelyn Liu	11
(Kazakhstan) Sofiya Aktayeva	10
(United States) Josephina Conway	15
(China) Zhang Siqi	12
(Hong Kong) Janelle Leung	15
(Ukraine) Dariia Myroniuk	6
(Japan) Yuka Ueno	15

Round of 32
(United States) Lauren Scruggs	15
(Russia) Anna Soloveva	12
(Hong Kong) Daphne Chan	5
(United States) Carolina Stutchbury	15
(United States) Jaelyn Liu	15
(United States) Josephina Conway	9
(Hong Kong) Janelle Leung	3
(Japan) Yuka Ueno	15

Round of 16
(United States) Lauren Scruggs	12
(United States) Carolina Stutchbury	11
(United States) Jaelyn Liu	8
(Japan) Yuka Ueno	9

Quarterfinals
(United States) Lauren Scruggs	13
(Japan) Yuka Ueno	15

=== Bottom half ===
==== Section 3 ====
Round of 64
(Italy) Arianna Errigo	15
(Macau) Ku Hio Lam	9
(China) Fu Yingying	12
(Hungary) Dóra Lupkovics	10
(South Korea) Park Ji-hee	13
(Cambodia) Olga Calissi	12
(Germany) Leonie Ebert	15
(Ukraine) Olga Sopit	5
(Russia) Marta Martyanova	15
(Ukraine) Kristina Petrova	9
(Russia) Vladislava Peniushkina	15
(Czech Republic) Michala Illeková	6
(Greece) Maria Chaldaiou	9
(Greece) Aikaterini Kontochristopoulou	15
(New Zealand) Ruby Chan	8
(Italy) Anna Cristino	15

Round of 32
(Italy) Arianna Errigo	15
(China) Fu Yingying	10
(South Korea) Park Ji-hee	15
(Germany) Leonie Ebert	8
(Russia) Marta Martyanova	8
(Russia) Vladislava Peniushkina	7
(Greece) Aikaterini Kontochristopoulou	9
(Italy) Anna Cristino	14

Round of 16
(Italy) Arianna Errigo	15
(South Korea) Park Ji-hee	6
(Russia) Marta Martyanova	5
(Italy) Anna Cristino	15

Quarterfinals
(Italy) Arianna Errigo	15
(Italy) Anna Cristino	7

==== Section 4 ====
Round of 64
(France) Pauline Ranvier	10
(China) Huang Qianqian	15
(Ukraine) Alina Poloziuk	15
(Spain) María Mariño	6
(Moldova) Adeline Senic	15
(Spain) Teresa Díaz	7
(Germany) Carlotta Morandi	11
(Japan) Sera Azuma	15
(Hungary) Flóra Pásztor	12
(Spain) Ariadna Tucker	11
(Israel) Gili Kuritzky	12
(France) Morgane Patru	13
(Hungary) Kata Kondricz	15
(South Korea) Lee Se-joo	8
(Poland) Karolina Żurawska	8
(Italy) Martina Batini	15

Round of 32
(China) Huang Qianqian	5
(Ukraine) Alina Poloziuk	15
(Moldova) Adeline Senic	13
(Japan) Sera Azuma	8
(Hungary) Flóra Pásztor	15
(France) Morgane Patru	10
(Hungary) Kata Kondricz	10
(Italy) Martina Batini	15

Round of 16
(Ukraine) Alina Poloziuk	10
(Moldova) Adeline Senic	9
(Hungary) Flóra Pásztor	12
(Italy) Martina Batini	15

Quarterfinals
(Ukraine) Alina Poloziuk	15
(Italy) Martina Batini	9
