= 2022 European Cadets and Juniors Fencing Championships =

Fencing competition in Novi Sad, Serbia

- Venue: SPC Vojvodina
- Location: Novi Sad, Serbia
- Dates: 26 February – 7 March 2022
- Website: fencingns2022.com

The 2022 European Cadets and Juniors Fencing Championships took place in Novi Sad, Serbia, from 26 February to 7 March 2022 and were organised by the European Fencing Confederation, the recognised governing body of European fencing. On 2 March, and following the IOC recommendations, that FIE Executive Committee decided not to invite or allow the participation of Russian and Belarusian athletes and officials in FIE competitions until further notice.

== Schedule ==
All times are CET (UTC+01:00).

Date	Time	Event	
26 February	9:00	Foil women juniors individual	Finals 18:30
26 February	12:30	Sabre men juniors individual	Finals 18:30
27 February	9:00	Foil men juniors individual	Finals 18:00
27 February	11:00	Épée women juniors individual	Finals 18:00
28 February	9:00	Épée men juniors individual	Finals 18:00
28 February	11:00	Sabre women juniors individual	Finals 18:00
1 March	9:00	Épée women juniors team	Finals 16:00
1 March	9:00	Foil women juniors team	Finals 16:00
1 March	12:00	Sabre men juniors team	Finals 16:00
2 March	9:00	Épée men juniors team	Finals 16:00
2 March	9:00	Foil men juniors team	Finals 16:00
2 March	12:00	Sabre women juniors team	Finals 16:00

Date	Time	Event	
3 March	9:00	Foil women cadets individual	Finals 18:00
3 March	13:00	Sabre men cadets individual	Finals 18:00
4 March	9:00	Foil men cadets individual	Finals 18:00
4 March	11:00	Épée women cadets individual	Finals 18:00
5 March	9:00	Épée men cadets individual	Finals 18:00
5 March	12:30	Sabre women cadets individual	Finals 18:00
6 March	9:00	Épée women cadets team	Finals 16:00
6 March	9:00	Foil women cadets team	Finals 16:00
6 March	12:00	Sabre men cadets team	Finals 16:00
7 March	9:00	Épée men cadets team	Finals 16:00
7 March	9:00	Foil men cadets team	Finals 16:00
7 March	12:00	Sabre women cadets team	Finals 16:00

== Medalists ==
=== Junior ===
Event	Gold	Silver	Bronze
Men
Épée men juniors individual	Zsombor Keszthelyi (HUN)	Alec Brooke (GBR)	Matteo Galassi (ITA); Yonatan Cohen (ISR)
Épée men juniors team	Switzerland; Théo Brochard; Diego Erbetta; Ian Hauri; Sven Vineis	Great Britain; Alec Brooke; James Jeal; Jacob Mitchell; Joseph Walmsley	Italy; Filippo Armaleo; Matteo Galassi; Simone Mencarelli; Enrico Piatti
Foil men juniors individual	Giulio Lombardi (ITA)	Valérian Castanié (FRA)	Eliot Chagnon (FRA); Paul-Antoine de Belval (FRA)
Foil men juniors team	Italy; Jacopo Bonato; Damiano Di Veroli; Giulio Lombardi; Tommaso Martini	Poland; Adam Jakubowski; Piotr Kaśków; Mateusz Kwiatkowski; Adam Podralski	France; Anas Anane; Valérian Castanié; Eliot Chagnon; Paul-Antoine de Belval
Sabre men juniors individual	Colin Heathcock (GER)	Radu Nitu (ROU)	Szymon Hryciuk (POL); Rémi Garrigue (FRA)
Sabre men juniors team	Germany; Antonio Heathcock; Colin Heathcock; Leon Kuzmin; Valentin Meka	Italy; Giorgio Marciano; Emanuele Nardella; Lorenzo Ottaviani; Pietro Torre	Bulgaria; Viktor Filev; Dimitar Raikin; Todor Stoychev; Georgi Zlatarov
Women
Épée women juniors individual	Anastasiia Rustamova (RUS)	Eszter Muhari (HUN)	Katharina Kozielski (GER); Gréta Gachályi (HUN)
Épée women juniors team	Hungary; Lili Büki; Gréta Gachályi; Eszter Muhari; Réka Salamon	Germany; Lara Goldmann; Katharina Kozielski; Laura Katalin Wetzker; Alexandra Zittel	Czech Republic; Gabriela Aigermanová; Veronika Bieleszová; Tereza Havlínová; Patricie Prokšíková
Foil women juniors individual	Carolina Stutchbury (GBR)	Irene Bertini (ITA)	Karina Vasile (ROU); Lior Druck (ISR)
Foil women juniors team	Romania; Emilia Corbu; Andreea Dincă; Teodora Șofran; Karina Vasile	France; Alicia Audibert; Esther Bonny; Héloïse Pelletier; Marion Rousseau	Ukraine; Kateryna Budenko; Kristina Petrova; Alina Poloziuk; Olga Sopit
Sabre women juniors individual	Amalia Aime (FRA)	Nisanur Erbil (TUR)	Sugár Katinka Battai (HUN); Felice Herbon (GER)
Sabre women juniors team	Hungary; Sugár Katinka Battai; Dorottya Beviz; Kira Keszei; Luca Szűcs	France; Amalia Aime; Cyrielle Girardin; Mathilde Mouroux; Lola Tranquille	Italy; Carlotta Fusetti; Manuela Spica; Lucia Stefanello; Mariella Viale

=== Cadet ===
Event	Gold	Silver	Bronze
Men
Épée men cadets individual	Jacopo Rizzi (ITA)	Alon Sarid (ISR)	Alec Brooke (GBR); Alexander Malvik (NOR)
Épée men cadets team	Italy; Matteo Galassi; Fabio Mastromarino; Giacomo Pietrobelli; Jacopo Rizzi	Hungary; Bulcsú Farkas; Ádám Horváth; Ágoston Kó; Domonkos Pelle	Israel; Omer Baruch; Bental Liman; Alon Sarid; Ilay Segal
Foil men cadets individual	Ambrus Budaházy (HUN)	Álmos Bálint (HUN)	Numa Crist (FRA); Jaimie Cook (GBR)
Foil men cadets team	Hungary; Albert Bagdány; Álmos Bálint; Ambrus Budaházy; Keán Horváth	Great Britain; Jaimie Cook; Callum Penman; David Sosnov; Nye Ulferts Kilpatrick	France; Numa Crist; Jean-Baptiste de Belval; Adrien Helmy-Cocoynacq; Louis Pradel
Sabre men cadets individual	Colin Heathcock (GER)	Lucas Guilley (FRA)	Tolga Aslan (TUR); Frigyes Godó (HUN)
Sabre men cadets team	Hungary; Frigyes Godó; Zsombor Hanzély; Kornél Péch; Oszkár Vajda	France; Tom Couderc; Lucas Guilley; Axel Pogu; Guillaume Scelles	Romania; Casian Cîdu; Dacian Enache; Rareș Gheorghe; Luca Radu
Women
Épée women cadets individual	Gréta Gachályi (HUN)	Alexandra Kravets (ISR)	Sofija Prošina (LAT); Emily Conrad (UKR)
Épée women cadets team	Italy; Allegra Cristofoletto; Eleonora Orso; Elisa Treglia; Federica Zogno	Spain; Silvia Gómez López; Helena Linares Urbina; Candela Lozano Porras; Martina Torrego Álvarez	Israel; Michal Cohen; Maya Freireich; Alexandra Kravets; Yuval Yizhaki
Foil women cadets individual	Matilde Molinari (ITA)	Jázmin Papp (HUN)	Sofia Giordani (ITA); Alisa İsbir (TUR)
Foil women cadets team	Italy; Beatrice Pia Maria Bibite; Greta Collini; Sofia Giordani; Matilde Molinari	Turkey; Fatima Zehra Anbarlılar; Elif Su Ay; Almıla Birçe Durukan; Alisa İsbir	Great Britain; Megan Elliott; Isabella Johnson; Carolina Stutchbury; Amelie Tsang
Sabre women cadets individual	Anna Spiesz (HUN)	Martina Giancola (ITA)	Maria Alexe (ROU); Tiziana Nitschmann (GER)
Sabre women cadets team	Hungary; Liza Bognár; Emese Domonkos; Zsanett Kovács; Anna Spiesz	Romania; Maria Alexe; Rosemarie Benciu; Alexandra Mitrus; Amalia Stan	France; Roxane Chabrol; Alejandra Manga; Ezechielle Martinez Almansa; Aurore Patrice

== Medals table ==
* Host nation (Serbia)

Rank	Nation	Gold	Silver	Bronze	Total
1	Hungary	9	4	3	16
2	Italy	7	3	4	14
3	Germany	3	1	3	7
4	France	1	5	7	13
5	Great Britain	1	3	3	7
6	Romania	1	2	3	6
7	Russia	1	0	0	1
7	Switzerland	1	0	0	1
9	Israel	0	2	4	6
10	Turkey	0	2	2	4
11	Poland	0	1	1	2
12	Spain	0	1	0	1
13	Ukraine	0	0	2	2
14	Bulgaria	0	0	1	1
14	Czech Republic	0	0	1	1
14	Latvia	0	0	1	1
14	Norway	0	0	1	1
Totals (17 entries)		24	24	36	84

== See also ==
- 2022 Asian Cadets and Juniors Fencing Championships
- 2022 World Cadets and Juniors Fencing Championships
