= Women's foil at the 2022 World Fencing Championships =

Competition at the 20222 WFC

- Venue: Cairo Stadium Indoor Halls Complex
- Location: Cairo, Egypt
- Dates: 16 July (qualification); 19 July
- Competitors: 118 from 43 nations

Medalists
gold medal	Ysaora Thibus	France
silver medal	Arianna Errigo	Italy
bronze medal	Lee Kiefer	United States
bronze medal	Maria Boldor	Romania

The Women's foil competition at the 2022 World Fencing Championships was held on 19 July 2022. The qualification was held on 16 July.

== Draw ==
=== Finals ===
Semifinals
(United States) Lee Kiefer	14
(Italy) Arianna Errigo	15
(Romania) Maria Boldor	3
(France) Ysaora Thibus	15

Final
(Italy) Arianna Errigo	10
(France) Ysaora Thibus	15

=== Top half ===
==== Section 1 ====
Round of 64
(United States) Lee Kiefer	15
(Chile) Katina Proestakis	11
(Philippines) Samantha Catantan	8
(South Korea) Hong Se-na	15
(Poland) Martyna Długosz	14
(Spain) Teresa Díaz	15
(Austria) Beatrice Kudlacek
(Italy) Martina Favaretto	w/o
(United States) Jacqueline Dubrovich	15
(Austria) Freya Cenker	6
(Poland) Hanna Łyczbińska	12
(Egypt) Yara El-Sharkawy	11
(Poland) Julia Walczyk	15
(South Korea) Hong Hyo-jin	14
(Singapore) Maxine Wong	7
(Japan) Yuka Ueno	15

Round of 32
(United States) Lee Kiefer	15
(South Korea) Hong Se-na	6
(Spain) Teresa Díaz	15
(Italy) Martina Favaretto	14
(United States) Jacqueline Dubrovich	14
(Poland) Hanna Łyczbińska	15
(Poland) Julia Walczyk	7
(Japan) Yuka Ueno	15

Round of 16
(United States) Lee Kiefer	15
(Spain) Teresa Díaz	5
(Poland) Hanna Łyczbińska	5
(Japan) Yuka Ueno	15

Quarterfinals
(United States) Lee Kiefer	15
(Japan) Yuka Ueno	12

==== Section 2 ====
Round of 64
(Germany) Leonie Ebert	13
(Thailand) Chayanutphat Shinnakerdchoke	10
(France) Solène Butruille	4
(United Kingdom) Carolina Stutchbury	15
(United States) Zander Rhodes	14
(United Kingdom) Yasmin Campbell	9
(Spain) Ariadna Castro	9
(Italy) Francesca Palumbo	15
(France) Anita Blaze	15
(Germany) Leandra Behr	9
(Egypt) Noha Hany	5
(China) Shi Yue	15
(Hong Kong) Kimberly Cheung	14
(Spain) María Mariño	15
(Brazil) Rafaella Gomes	8
(Italy) Arianna Errigo	15

Round of 32
(Germany) Leonie Ebert	15
(United Kingdom) Carolina Stutchbury	11
(United States) Zander Rhodes	13
(Italy) Francesca Palumbo	15
(France) Anita Blaze	12
(China) Shi Yue	15
(Spain) María Mariño	3
(Italy) Arianna Errigo	15

Round of 16
(Germany) Leonie Ebert	10
(Italy) Francesca Palumbo	15
(China) Shi Yue	8
(Italy) Arianna Errigo	15

Quarterfinals
(Italy) Francesca Palumbo	3
(Italy) Arianna Errigo	15

=== Bottom half ===
==== Section 3 ====
Round of 64
(Canada) Eleanor Harvey	11
(Ukraine) Olha Sopit	7
(Austria) Olivia Wohlgemuth	9
(China) Cai Yuanting	14
(Ukraine) Alina Poloziuk	15
(Uzbekistan) Umida Ilyosova	3
(Romania) Maria Boldor	15
(Canada) Kelleigh Ryan	5
(Germany) Anne Sauer	15
(Ukraine) Kristina Petrova	6
(Hong Kong) Valerie Cheng	4
(Hungary) Kata Kondricz	15
(Hungary) Flóra Pásztor	11
(France) Pauline Ranvier	15
(Mexico) Alely Hernández	7
(China) Chen Qingyuan	15

Round of 32
(Canada) Eleanor Harvey	15
(China) Cai Yuanting	11
(Ukraine) Alina Poloziuk	7
(Romania) Maria Boldor	15
(Germany) Anne Sauer	13
(Hungary) Kata Kondricz	15
(France) Pauline Ranvier	15
(China) Chen Qingyuan	11

Round of 16
(Canada) Eleanor Harvey	7
(Romania) Maria Boldor	15
(Hungary) Kata Kondricz	7
(France) Pauline Ranvier	15

Quarterfinals
(Romania) Maria Boldor	15
(France) Pauline Ranvier	12

==== Section 4 ====
Round of 64
(Canada) Jessica Guo	15
(Hungary) Anna Pöltz	10
(Sweden) Miriam Schreiber	15
(South Korea) Chae Song-oh	9
(South Korea) Park Ji-hee	12
(Singapore) Amita Berthier	15
(Japan) Karin Miyawaki	13
(France) Ysaora Thibus	15
(Japan) Sera Azuma	15
(Turkey) İrem Karamete	10
(Poland) Martyna Jelińska	11
(China) Wu Peilin	9
(Canada) Sabrina Fang	3
(United States) Maia Weintraub	15
(Romania) Mălina Călugăreanu	11
(Italy) Alice Volpi	15

Round of 32
(Canada) Jessica Guo	15
(Sweden) Miriam Schreiber	3
(Singapore) Amita Berthier	5
(France) Ysaora Thibus	15
(Japan) Sera Azuma	15
(Poland) Martyna Jelińska	5
(United States) Maia Weintraub	15
(Italy) Alice Volpi	13

Round of 16
(Canada) Jessica Guo	8
(France) Ysaora Thibus	15
(Japan) Sera Azuma	15
(United States) Maia Weintraub	12

Quarterfinals
(France) Ysaora Thibus	15
(Japan) Sera Azuma	11
