= 2023 Pan American Fencing Championships =

Fencing championship in Lima, Peru

- Host city: Lima, Peru
- Dates: 15 June – 21 June
- Main venue: Polideportivo Velodromo Videna

The 2023 Pan American Fencing Championships were held in Lima, Peru at the Polideportivo Velodromo Videna from June 15 to June 21, 2023.

== Medal summary ==
=== Men ===
| Event | Gold | Silver | Bronze |
|---|---|---|---|
| Individual Foil | Gerek Meinhardt; United States | Nick Itkin; United States | Guilherme Toldo; Brazil |
| Individual Foil | Gerek Meinhardt; United States | Nick Itkin; United States | Alexander Massialas; United States |
| Individual Épée | Rubén Limardo; Venezuela | Nicholas Zhang; Canada | Grabiel Lugo; Venezuela |
| Individual Épée | Rubén Limardo; Venezuela | Nicholas Zhang; Canada | Jhon Édison Rodríguez; Colombia |
| Individual Sabre | Andrew Doddo; United States | Jose Quintero; Venezuela | Eliecer Romero; Venezuela |
| Individual Sabre | Andrew Doddo; United States | Jose Quintero; Venezuela | Pascual Maria Di Tella; Argentina |
| Team Foil | United States; Miles Chamley-Watson; Nick Itkin; Gerek Meinhardt; Alexander Massialas | Canada; Blake Broszus; Bogdan Hamilton; Patrick Liu; Maximilien Haaster Van | Chile; David Alarcon; Juvenal Alarcon; Leopoldo Alarcon Roman; Gustavo Sirriya Alarcon |
| Team Épée | Venezuela; Francisco Limardo; Rubén Limardo; Jesús Limardo; Grabiel Lugo | Colombia; Andres Felipe Campos; Juan Castillo; Hernando Roa; Jhon Édison Rodríguez | Canada; Fynn Fafard; Dylan French; Samuel Gallagher Pelletier; Nicholas Zhang |
| Team Sabre | United States; Eli Dershwitz; Andrew Doddo; Colin Heathcock; Mitchell Saron | Canada; Fares Arfa; Francois Cauchon; Shaul Gordon; Andrew Wei | Venezuela; Hender Daniel Medina; Jose Quintero; Abraham Rodriguez; Eliecer Romero |

=== Women ===
| Event | Gold | Silver | Bronze |
|---|---|---|---|
| Individual Foil | Lee Kiefer; United States | Maia Mei Weintraub; United States | Lauren Scruggs; United States |
| Individual Foil | Lee Kiefer; United States | Maia Mei Weintraub; United States | Jessica Zi Jia Guo; Canada |
| Individual Épée | Catherine Nixon; United States | Montserrat Viveros; Paraguay | Nathalie Moellhausen; Brazil |
| Individual Épée | Catherine Nixon; United States | Montserrat Viveros; Paraguay | Katharine Holmes; United States |
| Individual Sabre | Magda Skarbonkiewicz; United States | Pamela Brind’Amour; Canada | Elizabeth Tartakovsky; United States |
| Individual Sabre | Magda Skarbonkiewicz; United States | Pamela Brind’Amour; Canada | Karina Trois; Brazil |
| Team Foil | Canada; Sabrina Fang; Jessica Zi Jia Guo; Eleanor Harvey; Yunjia Zhang | United States; Jacqueline Dubrovich; Lee Kiefer; Lauren Scruggs; Maia Mei Weintraub | Mexico; Denisse Alely Hernandez; Victoria Maria Isabel Meza; Nataly Michel; Melissa Rebolledo |
| Team Épée | United States; Katharine Holmes; Hadley Husisian; Catherine Nixon; Isis Washington | Canada; Leonora Mackinnon; Marie-Frederique Millette; Alexanne Verret; Ruien Xiao | Brazil; Nathalie Moellhausen; Amanda Netto; Marcela Silva; Victoria Vizeu |
| Team Sabre | United States; Maia Chamberlain; Tatiana Nazlymov; Magda Skarbonkiewicz; Elizabeth Tartakovsky | Mexico; Natalia Botello; Diana Gonzalez; Regina Pedraza; Julieta Toleto | Venezuela; Luismar Banezca; Katherine F. Paredes; Shia Rodriguez; Fabiangela Ruido |

== Medal table ==
* Host nation (Peru)

| Rank | Nation | Gold | Silver | Bronze | Total |
|---|---|---|---|---|---|
| 1 | United States | 9 | 3 | 4 | 16 |
| 2 | Venezuela | 2 | 1 | 4 | 7 |
| 3 | Canada | 1 | 5 | 2 | 8 |
| 4 | Colombia | 0 | 1 | 1 | 2 |
| 4 | Mexico | 0 | 1 | 1 | 2 |
| 6 | Paraguay | 0 | 1 | 0 | 1 |
| 7 | Brazil | 0 | 0 | 4 | 4 |
| 8 | Argentina | 0 | 0 | 1 | 1 |
| 8 | Chile | 0 | 0 | 1 | 1 |
| Totals (9 entries) | | 12 | 12 | 18 | 42 |
