= 2021 World Cadets and Juniors Fencing Championships =

2021 Junior and Cadet World Fencing Championships
- Dates: 3–11 April 2021
- Host city: Cairo, Egypt
- Venue: Cairo Stadium Indoor Halls Complex
- Events: 18

The 2021 Junior and Cadet World Fencing Championships took place from 3 to 11 April 2021 in Cairo, Egypt.

== Medal summary ==
=== Junior ===
==== Men ====
| Event | Gold | Silver | Bronze |
|---|---|---|---|
| Individual épée | Kendrick Jean-Joseph (FRA) | Mohamed Yasseen (EGY) | Samuel Berktold (AUT) |
| Individual épée | Kendrick Jean-Joseph (FRA) | Mohamed Yasseen (EGY) | Mohamed Elsayed (EGY) |
| Team épée | Russia; Kirill Gurov; Egor Lomaga; Artem Sarkisyan; Aleksey Udovichenko | United States; Mihir Kumashi; Nicholas Lawson; Valentin Matveev; Tristan Szapary | Egypt; Amr Abdelbaky; Mohamed Elsayed; Ibrahim Ramadan; Mohamed Yasseen |
| Individual foil | Zakhar Kozlov (RUS) | Choi Dong-yun (KOR) | Stepan Martynovich (RUS) |
| Individual foil | Zakhar Kozlov (RUS) | Choi Dong-yun (KOR) | Constant Roger (FRA) |
| Team foil | Russia; Egor Barannikov; Zakhar Kozlov; Daniil Kravtsov; Stepan Martynovich | United States; Kenji Bravo; Ashton Daniel; Marcello Olivares; Daniel Zhang | France; Valérian Castanie; Paul-Antoine De Belval; Constant Roger; Armand Spichiger |
| Individual sabre | Kirill Tyulyukov (RUS) | Bobirjon Rasulov (UZB) | Szymon Hryciuk (POL) |
| Individual sabre | Kirill Tyulyukov (RUS) | Bobirjon Rasulov (UZB) | Adham Moataz (EGY) |
| Team sabre | Egypt; Mazen Elaraby; Eyad Marouf; Adham Moataz; Zeyad Nofal | Russia; Magamed Khalimbekov; Dmitriy Nasonov; Artem Terekhov; Kirill Tyulyukov | France; Paco Boureau; Duncan Glenadel; Samuel Jarry; Antoine Pogu |

==== Women ====
| Event | Gold | Silver | Bronze |
|---|---|---|---|
| Individual épée | Polina Khaertdinova (RUS) | Jessica Lin (USA) | Kim So-hui (KOR) |
| Individual épée | Polina Khaertdinova (RUS) | Jessica Lin (USA) | Anastasiia Zelentsova (UKR) |
| Team épée | Russia; Iana Bekmurzova; Anna Gzyunova; Polina Khaertdinova; Aizanat Murtazaeva | Spain; Claudia Arribas; Nicole Lixandru; Dana Raposo; Paula Zugasti | Poland; Zofia Janelli; Alicja Klasik; Gloria Klughardt; Kinga Zgryźniak |
| Individual foil | May Tieu (USA) | Nicole Pustilnik (ISR) | Joo Yeong-ji (KOR) |
| Individual foil | May Tieu (USA) | Nicole Pustilnik (ISR) | Jessica Zi Jia Guo (CAN) |
| Team foil | Russia; Vitalina Anaschenkova; Adelina Bikbulatova; Angelina Kononova; Daria Malysheva | United States; Zander Rhodes; Lauren Scruggs; May Tieu; Maia Mei Weintraub | Ukraine; Kateryna Budenko; Kristina Petrova; Alina Poloziuk; Olga Sopit |
| Individual sabre | Jeon Ha-young (KOR) | Nisanur Erbil (TUR) | Dariya Drozd (RUS) |
| Individual sabre | Jeon Ha-young (KOR) | Nisanur Erbil (TUR) | Valeriia Prochenko (UKR) |
| Team sabre | South Korea; Jang Bo-ryeon; Jeon Ha-young; Lee Ju-eun; Park Ju-mee | United States; Alexis Anglade; Atara Greenbaum; Honor Johnson; Zoe Kim | Romania; Mihaela Chițu; Felicia Iacob; Maria Matei; Ilinca Pantiș |

=== Cadet ===
==== Men ====
| Event | Gold | Silver | Bronze |
|---|---|---|---|
| Individual épée | Antoni Socha (POL) | Artem Sarkisyan (RUS) | Kim Do-wan (KOR) |
| Individual épée | Antoni Socha (POL) | Artem Sarkisyan (RUS) | Skyler Liverant (USA) |
| Individual foil | Daniel Zhang (USA) | An Hyeon-bhin (KOR) | Lee Seoung-bin (KOR) |
| Individual foil | Daniel Zhang (USA) | An Hyeon-bhin (KOR) | Chase Emmer (USA) |
| Individual Sabre | Marco Sovar (ROU) | Park Jun-seong (KOR) | Colby Harley (USA) |
| Individual Sabre | Marco Sovar (ROU) | Park Jun-seong (KOR) | Arseniy Shelekhov (RUS) |

==== Women ====
| Event | Gold | Silver | Bronze |
|---|---|---|---|
| Individual épée | Alicja Klasik (POL) | Ekaterina Kolbeneva (RUS) | Susanne Lannes (EST) |
| Individual épée | Alicja Klasik (POL) | Ekaterina Kolbeneva (RUS) | Ketki Ketkar (USA) |
| Individual foil | Jessica Zi Jia Guo (CAN) | Anastasia Beznosikova (RUS) | Maria Cojocari (MDA) |
| Individual foil | Jessica Zi Jia Guo (CAN) | Anastasia Beznosikova (RUS) | Alexandra Jing (USA) |
| Individual Sabre | Magda Skarbonkiewicz (USA) | Yulia Salabai (RUS) | Zarifa Huseynova (AZE) |
| Individual Sabre | Magda Skarbonkiewicz (USA) | Yulia Salabai (RUS) | Zoe Kim (USA) |

== Medal table ==
* Host nation (Egypt)

| Rank | Nation | Gold | Silver | Bronze | Total |
|---|---|---|---|---|---|
| 1 | Russia | 7 | 5 | 3 | 15 |
| 2 | United States | 3 | 5 | 6 | 14 |
| 3 | South Korea | 2 | 3 | 4 | 9 |
| 4 | Poland | 2 | 0 | 2 | 4 |
| 5 | Egypt* | 1 | 1 | 3 | 5 |
| 6 | France | 1 | 0 | 3 | 4 |
| 7 | Canada | 1 | 0 | 1 | 2 |
| 7 | Romania | 1 | 0 | 1 | 2 |
| 9 | Israel | 0 | 1 | 0 | 1 |
| 9 | Spain | 0 | 1 | 0 | 1 |
| 9 | Turkey | 0 | 1 | 0 | 1 |
| 9 | Uzbekistan | 0 | 1 | 0 | 1 |
| 13 | Ukraine | 0 | 0 | 3 | 3 |
| 14 | Austria | 0 | 0 | 1 | 1 |
| 14 | Azerbaijan | 0 | 0 | 1 | 1 |
| 14 | Estonia | 0 | 0 | 1 | 1 |
| 14 | Moldova | 0 | 0 | 1 | 1 |
| Totals (17 entries) | | 18 | 18 | 30 | 66 |
