= Martino Minuto =

Turkish fencer (born 1988)

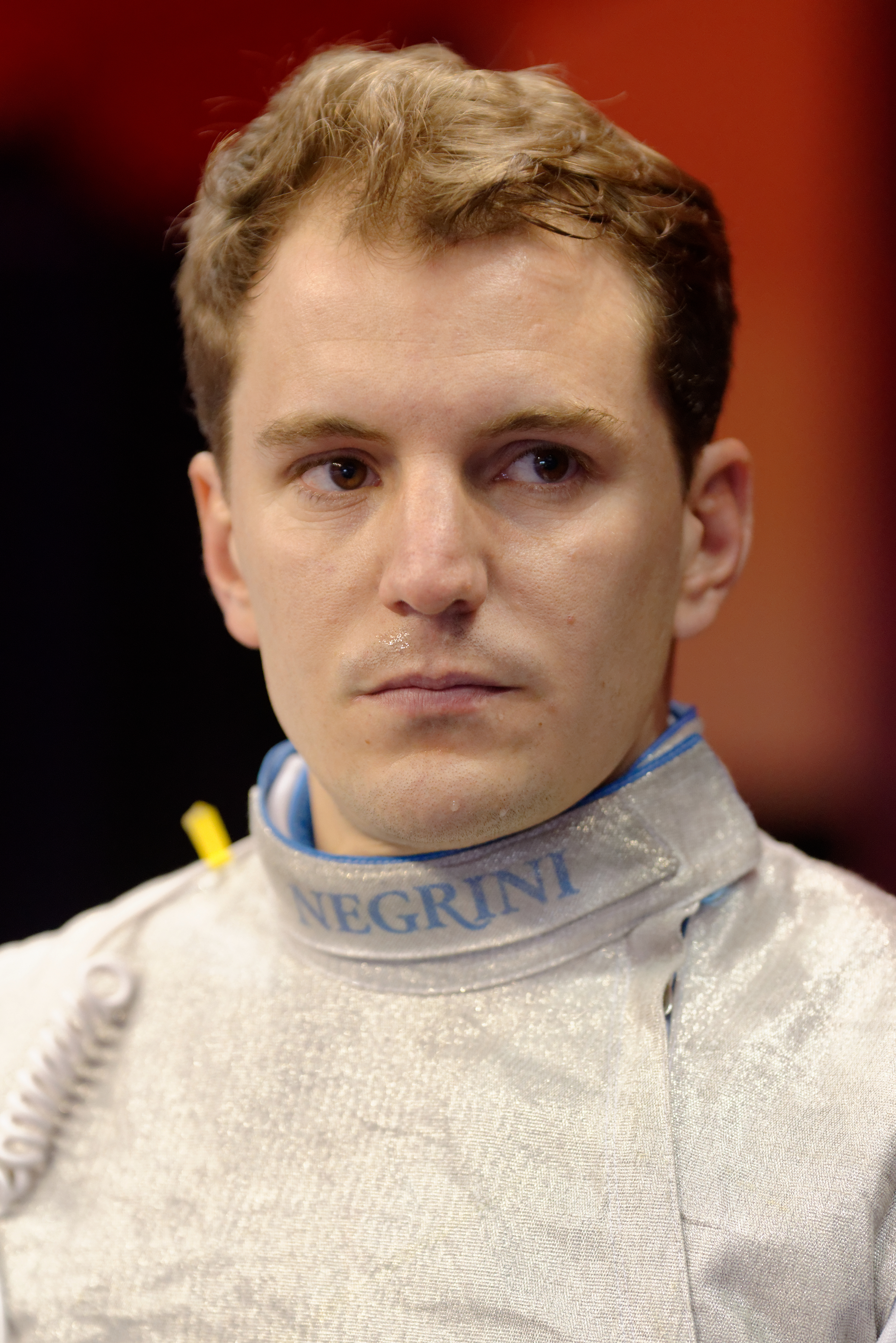
- Martino Minuto (February 2015)

Personal information
- Nickname: Marti
- Nationality: Italy Turkey
- Born: 7 April 1988 (age 38) Milan, Italy

Sport
- Sport: Fencing
- Event: Foil
- Club: Spor Toto SK
Medal record
Women's Fencing
Representing Italy
FISU World University Games
Gold medal – first place	2011 Shenzhen	Foil nd.
Silver medal – second place	2011 Shenzhen	Foil team
World Cadets and Juniors Championships
Gold medal – first place	2007 Belek	Foil ind.
Representing Turkey
Islamic Solidarity Games
Silver medal – second place	2021 Konya	Foil ind.
Silver medal – second place	2021 Konya	Foil team
FIE Satellite Tour
Gold medal – first place	2025 Amsterdam	Foil ind.
Gold medal – first place	2019 Bucharest	Foil ind.
Gold medal – first place	2019 Tashkent	Foil ind.
Gold medal – first place	2019 Bratislava	Foil ind.
Silver medal – second place	2018 London	Foil ind.
Gold medal – first place	2018 Amsterdam	Foil ind.
Gold medal – first place	2018 Bucharest	Foil ind.
Bronze medal – third place	2018 Barcelona	Foil ind.
Gold medal – first place	2017 Amsterdam	Foil ind.
Silver medal – second place	2017 Barcelona	Foil ind.
Silver medal – second place	2016 Cancun	Foil ind.
Bronze medal – third place	2015 Kocaeli	Foil ind.
Bronze medal – third place	2015 Copenhagen	Foil ind.
Gold medal – first place	2014 Kocaeli	Foil ind.
FISU World University Games
Bronze medal – third place	2015 Gwangju	Foil nd.

Martino Minuto (born 7 April 1988), nicknamed Marti, is a fencer who competes in the foil event. Born in Italy, he represented his country at international level before he acquired Turkish citizenship and started to compete for Turkey.

== Sport career ==
=== Italy ===
2007

He took the gold medal in the U20 foil individual event at the 2007 World Cadets and Juniors Fencing Championships in Belek, Antalya, Turkey.

2011

He won the gold medal in the foil individual and the silver medal in the foil team event with Alessio Foconi, Tommaso Lari and Luca Simoncelli at the 2011 Summer Universiade in Shenzhen, China.

=== Turkey ===
2014

Minuto was contacted by the Turkish Fencing Federation after his performance at the 2007 World Cadets and Juniors Championships in Belek, Turkey. Although, he had no direct ties to the country, he decided in October 2014 to accept the invitation for representing Turkey. After his move to Turkey, he joined the fencing club in Adıyaman, southern Anatolia.

In December 2014, he competed for Turkey at the 2014–15 Fencing World Cup's Tournoi satellite (Kocaeli), Turkey leg, and won the gold medal.

2015

He took a bronze medal in the foil individual event at the 2015 Tournoi satellite (Copenhagen), Denmark. At the 2015 Summer Universiade in Gwangju, South Korea, he became bronze medalist in the individual event.

2016

He won the silver medal at the 2016 Tournoi satellite (Cancun), Mexico.

2017

At the 2017 Tournoi satellite (Barcelona), Spain, he received the silver medal, and the same year at the Tournoi satellite (Amsterdam), Netherlands, he captured the gold medal.

2018

In 2018, he took a bronze medal in the foil individual event at the Tournoi satellite (Barcelona), Spain, won the gold medal at the Tournoi satellite (Bucharest), Romania, and another gold medal at the Tournoi satellite (Amsterdam), Netherlands, and the silver medal at the Tournoi satellite (London), United Kingdom.

2019

In 2019, he captured the gold medal in the individual event at the Tournoi satellite (Bratislava), Slovakia, a gold medal at the Tournoi satellite (Tashkent), Uzbekistan, and again another gold medal at the 2019 Tournoi satellite (Bucharest), Romania.

2022

At the 2021 Islamic Solidarity Games in Konya, Turkey, which were postponed to 2022 due to the COVID-19 pandemic in Turkey, he won two silver medals, in the individual foil and in the team event with Mustafa Burak Çufadar, Alp Eyüpoğlu and Utku Özyalçın.

2025

He won the gold medal in the individual event at the 2025 Tournoi satellite (Amsterdam), Netherlands.

== Personal life ==
Minuto was born in Milan, Italy on 7 April 1988. He acquired Turkish citizenship for sporting reasons in October 2014.

He studied Economics and Management at the Università degli Studi Niccolò Cusano in Rome, Italy.
