= Spor Toto SK (fencing) =

Fencing club in Turkey

Spor Toto SK Fencing
- Country: Turkey
- Affiliation: Turkish Fencing Federation
- Location: Ankara, Turkey

Spor Toto SK Fencing is the fencing side of the Turkish multi-sport club Spor Toto SK based in Ankara.

== Members ==
- Alisa İsbir (born 2005), women's foil,
- İrem Karamete (born 1993), women's foil,
- Martino Minuto (born 1988), men's foil,
- Iryna Shchukla (born 1995), women's sabre,
