= 2019 World Cadets and Juniors Fencing Championships =

2019 Junior World Fencing Championships
- Dates: 6–14 April 2019
- Host city: Toruń, Poland
- Venue: Arena Toruń
- Events: 18

The 2019 Junior World Fencing Championships from 6 to 14 April at 2019 in Toruń, Poland.

== Medal summary ==
=== Junior events ===
==== Men's events ====
Event	Gold	Silver	Bronze
Individual épée	Arthur Philippe (FRA)	Davide Di Veroli (ITA)	Gianpaolo Buzzacchino (ITA)
Individual épée	Arthur Philippe (FRA)	Davide Di Veroli (ITA)	Ruslan Hasanov (AZE)
Team épée	Hungary; Tibor Andrásfi; Bence Bende; Máté Tamás Koch; Dávid Nagy	United States; Stephen Ewart; Isaac Herbst; Cedric Mecke; Jonathan Piskovatskov	France; Simon Contrepois; Samuel Jubault; Lilian Nguefack; Arthur Philippe
Individual foil	Kirill Borodachev (RUS)	Vladislav Mylnikov (RUS)	Mohamed Hamza (EGY)
Individual foil	Kirill Borodachev (RUS)	Vladislav Mylnikov (RUS)	Rui Fujikura (JPN)
Team foil	Russia; Anton Borodachev; Kirill Borodachev; Vladislav Mylnikov; Ivan Troshin	France; Tyvan Bibard; Constant Roger; Rafael Savin; Armand Spichiger	Italy; Alessio Di Tommaso; Tommaso Marini; Alessandro Stella; Pietro Velluti
Individual sabre	Lorenzo Roma (ITA)	George Dragomir (ROU)	Mitchell Saron (USA)
Individual sabre	Lorenzo Roma (ITA)	George Dragomir (ROU)	Giacomo Mignuzzi (ITA)
Team sabre	Italy; Luca Fioretto; Michele Gallo; Giacomo Mignuzzi; Lorenzo Roma	Russia; Magamed Khalimbekov; Vladislav Pozdnyakov; Artem Tselyshev; Kirill Tyulyukov	United States; Kamar Skeete; Erwin Cai; Mitchell Saron; Christopher Walker

==== Women's events ====
Event	Gold	Silver	Bronze
Individual épée	Federica Isola (ITA)	Gaia Traditi (ITA)	Kim Si-eun (KOR)
Individual épée	Federica Isola (ITA)	Gaia Traditi (ITA)	Greta Candreva (USA)
Team épée	France; Emma Lauvray; Aliya Luty; Eloise Vanryssel; Léa Varela	Russia; Aizanat Murtazaeva; Manana Saumova; Anastasia Soldatova; Evgeniya Zharkova	Switzerland; Angeline Favre; Aurore Favre; Emilie Gabutti; Fiona Hatz
Individual foil	Lauren Scruggs (USA)	Martina Favaretto (ITA)	Yuka Ueno (JPN)
Individual foil	Lauren Scruggs (USA)	Martina Favaretto (ITA)	Park Ji-hee (KOR)
Team foil	Russia; Adelina Bikbulatova; Elena Petrova; Alexandra Sunduchkova; Anna Udovichenko	Japan; Sera Azuma; Arisa Kano; Sumire Tsuji; Yuka Ueno	South Korea; Choi Yu-min; Ji Celine; Joo Yeong-ji; Park Ji-hee
Individual sabre	Alina Mikhailova (RUS)	Natalia Botello (MEX)	Yoana Ilieva (BUL)
Individual sabre	Alina Mikhailova (RUS)	Natalia Botello (MEX)	Benedetta Taricco (ITA)
Team sabre	Hungary; Sugár Katinka Battai; Dorottya Bérczy; Valentina Nagy; Liza Pusztai	Germany; Anna-Lena Bürkert; Larissa Eifler; Julika Funke; Lisa Gette	Italy; Giulia Arpino; Chiara Pagano Fusco; Claudia Rotili; Benedetta Taricco

=== Cadet events ===
==== Men's events ====
Event	Gold	Silver	Bronze
Individual épée	Enrico Piatti (ITA)	Dario Remondini (ITA)	Kirill Gurov (RUS)
Individual épée	Enrico Piatti (ITA)	Dario Remondini (ITA)	Akseli Heinämaa (FIN)
Individual foil	Egor Barannikov (RUS)	Paul-Antoine de Belval (FRA)	Giuseppe Franzoni (ITA)
Individual foil	Egor Barannikov (RUS)	Paul-Antoine de Belval (FRA)	Xu Jie (CHN)
Individual Sabre	Vasyl Humen (UKR)	Giorgio Marciano (ITA)	Donghwan Park (USA)
Individual Sabre	Vasyl Humen (UKR)	Giorgio Marciano (ITA)	Lee Do-hun (KOR)

==== Women's events ====
Event	Gold	Silver	Bronze
Individual épée	Eszter Muhari (HUN)	Gaia Caforio (ITA)	Zofia Janelli (POL)
Individual épée	Eszter Muhari (HUN)	Gaia Caforio (ITA)	Lili Büki (HUN)
Individual foil	Lauren Scruggs (USA)	Hong Se-in (KOR)	Margherita Lorenzi (ITA)
Individual foil	Lauren Scruggs (USA)	Hong Se-in (KOR)	Valeriya Rassolova (RUS)
Individual Sabre	Luca Szűcs (HUN)	Chloe Gouhin (USA)	Honor Johnson (USA)
Individual Sabre	Luca Szűcs (HUN)	Chloe Gouhin (USA)	Benedetta Fusetti (ITA)

== Medal table ==
* Host nation (Poland)

Rank	Nation	Gold	Silver	Bronze	Total
1	Russia	5	3	2	10
2	Italy	4	6	8	18
3	Hungary	4	0	1	5
4	United States	2	2	5	9
5	France	2	2	1	5
6	Ukraine	1	0	0	1
7	South Korea	0	1	4	5
8	Japan	0	1	2	3
9	Germany	0	1	0	1
9	Mexico	0	1	0	1
9	Romania	0	1	0	1
12	Azerbaijan	0	0	1	1
12	Bulgaria	0	0	1	1
12	China	0	0	1	1
12	Egypt	0	0	1	1
12	Finland	0	0	1	1
12	Poland*	0	0	1	1
12	Switzerland	0	0	1	1
Totals (18 entries)		18	18	30	66
