= 2022 Junior and Cadet Fencing World Championships =

International fencing competition

- Dates: 2–10 April
- Host city: Dubai, UAE
- Venue: Hamdan Sports Complex
- Events: 18

The 2022 Junior and Cadet Fencing World Championships took place from 2 to 10 April 2022 in Dubai, UAE. The opening ceremony was held on 3 April 2022.

== Nations ==
The following nations sent fencers to these Championships:

1. Algeria
2. Angola
3. Antigua and Barbuda
4. Argentina
5. Armenia
6. Australia
7. Austria
8. Azerbaijan
9. Barbados
10. Belgium
11. Bolivia
12. Brazil
13. Bulgaria
14. Cambodia
15. Canada
16. Chile
17. Colombia
18. Costa Rica
19. Croatia
20. Cyprus
21. Czech Republic
22. Denmark
23. Egypt
24. El Salvador
25. Estonia
26. Finland
27. France
28. Georgia
29. Germany
30. Ghana
31. Great Britain
32. Greece
33. Guam
34. Hong Kong
35. Hungary
36. Iceland
37. India
38. Iraq
39. Ireland
40. Israel
41. Italy
42. Japan
43. Jordan
44. Kazakhstan
45. Kuwait
46. Kyrgyzstan
47. Latvia
48. Lebanon
49. Libya
50. Lithuania
51. Luxembourg
52. Malaysia
53. Mexico
54. Moldova
55. Mongolia
56. Morocco
57. Nepal
58. Netherlands
59. New Zealand
60. Nicaragua
61. Niger
62. Norway
63. Oman
64. Pakistan
65. Paraguay
66. Peru
67. Philippines
68. Poland
69. Portugal
70. Puerto Rico
71. Qatar
72. Romania
73. Saudi Arabia
74. Senegal
75. Serbia
76. Singapore
77. Slovakia
78. Slovenia
79. South Africa
80. South Korea
81. Spain
82. Sri Lanka
83. Sweden
84. Switzerland
85. Syria
86. Tajikistan
87. Thailand
88. Togo
89. Tunisia
90. Turkey
91. United Arab Emirates
92. Uganda
93. Ukraine
94. Uruguay
95. United States
96. United States Virgin Islands
97. Uzbekistan
98. Venezuela
99. Yemen

Note: Due to the ongoing Russian invasion of Ukraine, fencers from Russia and Belarus were banned from competing.

== Medals summary ==
=== Junior ===
==== Men ====
Event	Gold	Silver	Bronze
Épée Individual	Zsombor Keszthelyi; Hungary	Mohamed Yasseen; Egypt	James Jeal; Great Britain
Épée Individual	Zsombor Keszthelyi; Hungary	Mohamed Yasseen; Egypt	Lino Heurlin-Vazquez; France
Épée Team	Egypt; Mohamed El-Sayed; Mahmoud El-Sayed; Mohamed Gaber; Mohamed Yasseen	United States; Gabriel Feinberg; Justin Haddad; Henry Lawson; Skyler Liverant	France; Alban Diane; Paul Fortin; Lino Heurlin-Vazquez; Julien Maury
Foil Individual	Kazuki Iimura; Japan	An Hyeon-bhin; South Korea	Anas Anane; France
Foil Individual	Kazuki Iimura; Japan	An Hyeon-bhin; South Korea	Chase Emmer; United States
Foil Team	Italy; Jacopo Bonato; Damiano Di Veroli; Giulio Lombardi; Tommaso Martini	France; Anas Anane; Valérian Castanie; Paul-Antoine De Belval; Adrien Spichiger	Hungary; Albert Bagdány; Álmos Bálint; Andor Mihályi; Gergő Szemes
Sabre Individual	Colin Heathcock; Germany	Pietro Torre; Italy	Antonio Heathcock; Germany
Sabre Individual	Colin Heathcock; Germany	Pietro Torre; Italy	Hwang Heeg-eun; South Korea
Sabre Team	Italy; Edoardo Cantini; Giorgio Marciano; Lorenzo Ottaviani; Pietro Torre	Romania; Casian Cidu; Mihnea Enache; Radu Nitu; Marco Sovar	Egypt; Ahmed Hesham; Eyad Marouf; Adham Moataz; Zeyad Nofal

==== Women ====
Event	Gold	Silver	Bronze
Épée Individual	Hadley Husisian; United States	Nicole Feygin; Israel	Aleyna Ertürk; Turkey
Épée Individual	Hadley Husisian; United States	Nicole Feygin; Israel	Ketki Ketkar; United States
Épée Team	Israel; Adele Bogdanov; Nicole Feygin; Eva Galper; Sofia Vainberg	Poland; Cecylia Cieślik; Alicja Klasik; Gloria Klughardt; Kinga Zgryźniak	United States; Sarah Gu; Hadley Husisian; Ketki Ketkar; Faith Park
Foil Individual	Lauren Scruggs; United States	Yuzuha Takeyama; Japan	Carolina Stutchbury; Great Britain
Foil Individual	Lauren Scruggs; United States	Yuzuha Takeyama; Japan	Kateryna Budenko; Ukraine
Foil Team	United States; Rachael Kim; Zander Rhodes; Lauren Scruggs; Maia Weintraub	Italy; Giulia Amore; Irene Bertini; Carlotta Ferrari; Benedetta Pantanetti	Japan; Honami Chiba; Ayano Iimura; Hiyori Nakade; Yuzuha Takeyama
Sabre Individual	Magda Skarbonkiewicz; United States	Honor Johnson; United States	Zaynab Dayibekova; Uzbekistan
Sabre Individual	Magda Skarbonkiewicz; United States	Honor Johnson; United States	Sugár Katinka Battai; Hungary
Sabre Team	France; Amalia Aime; Cyrielle Girardin; Mathilde Mouroux; Lola Tranquille	Hungary; Sugár Katinka Battai; Dorottya Beviz; Kira Keszei; Luca Szűcs	Italy; Carlotta Fusetti; Manuela Spica; Lucia Stefanello; Mariella Viale

=== Cadet ===
==== Men ====
Event	Gold	Silver	Bronze
Épée	Samuel Imrek; United States	Alon Sarid; Israel	Fabio Mastromarino; Italy
Épée	Samuel Imrek; United States	Alon Sarid; Israel	Maksym Perchuk; Ukraine
Foil	Cheng Tit Nam; Hong Kong	Ruben Lindner; Germany	Andrew Chen; United States
Foil	Cheng Tit Nam; Hong Kong	Ruben Lindner; Germany	Matteo Iacomoni; Italy
Sabre	Zuhriddin Kodirov; Uzbekistan	Colin Heathcock; United States	William Morrill; United States
Sabre	Zuhriddin Kodirov; Uzbekistan	Colin Heathcock; United States	Cody Ji; United States

==== Women ====
Event	Gold	Silver	Bronze
Épée	Aleyna Ertürk; Turkey	Anna Maksymenko; Ukraine	Chen Hailin; Hong Kong
Épée	Aleyna Ertürk; Turkey	Anna Maksymenko; Ukraine	Mizuki Homma; Japan
Foil	Jessica Guo; Canada	Carolina Stutchbury; Great Britain	Rino Nagase; Japan
Foil	Jessica Guo; Canada	Carolina Stutchbury; Great Britain	Matilde Molinari; Italy
Sabre	Magda Skarbonkiewicz; United States	Siobhan Sullivan; United States	Alejandra Manga; France
Sabre	Magda Skarbonkiewicz; United States	Siobhan Sullivan; United States	Kim Eun-yu; South Korea

== Medal table ==
* Host nation (United Arab Emirates)

Rank	Nation	Gold	Silver	Bronze	Total
1	United States	6	3	6	15
2	Italy	2	2	4	8
3	Germany	1	2	1	4
4	Israel	1	2	0	3
5	France	1	1	4	6
6	Japan	1	1	3	5
7	Hungary	1	1	2	4
8	Egypt	1	1	1	3
9	Hong Kong	1	0	1	2
9	Turkey	1	0	1	2
9	Uzbekistan	1	0	1	2
12	Canada	1	0	0	1
13	Great Britain	0	1	2	3
13	South Korea	0	1	2	3
13	Ukraine	0	1	2	3
16	Poland	0	1	0	1
16	Romania	0	1	0	1
Totals (17 entries)		18	18	30	66

== See also ==
- 2022 European Cadets and Juniors Fencing Championships
- 2022 Asian Cadets and Juniors Fencing Championships
