= 2024 Pan American Fencing Championships =

Fencing championship in Lima, Peru

- Host city: Lima, Peru
- Dates: 25 June – 30 June

The 2024 Pan American Fencing Championships were held in Lima, Peru from June 25 to June 30, 2024.

== Medal summary ==
=== Men ===
Event	Gold	Silver	Bronze
Individual Foil	(United States) Nick Itkin	(United States) Gerek Meinhardt	(Brazil) Guilherme Toldo
Individual Foil	(United States) Nick Itkin	(United States) Gerek Meinhardt	(United States) Alexander Massialas
Individual Épée	(United States) Samuel Imrek	(United States Virgin Islands) Kruz Schembri	(Canada) Fynn Fafard
Individual Épée	(United States) Samuel Imrek	(United States Virgin Islands) Kruz Schembri	(Venezuela) Jesús Limardo
Individual Sabre	(United States) Eli Dershwitz	(United States) Mitchell Saron	(Canada) Fares Arfa
Individual Sabre	(United States) Eli Dershwitz	(United States) Mitchell Saron	(Canada) Olivier Desrosiers
Team Foil	United States; Miles Chamley-Watson; Nick Itkin; Alexander Massialas; Gerek Meinhardt	Brazil; Pedro Marostega; Guilherme Toldo; Paulo Morais; Ricardo Pacheco	Canada; Bogdan Hamilton; Maximilien Van Haaster; Blake Broszus; Daniel Gu
Team Épée	Venezuela; Francisco Limardo; Jesús Limardo; Rubén Limardo; Grabiel Lugo	Colombia; Juan Castillo; Kevin Restrepo; Hernando Roa; Jhon Édison Rodríguez	Brazil; Alexandre Camargo; Richard Grunhauser; Leopoldo Gubert; Pedro Petrich
Team Sabre	United States; Lev Ben Avram; Eli Dershwitz; Filip Dolegiewicz; Mitchell Saron	Canada; Fares Arfa; Francois Cauchon; Olivier Desrosiers; Shaul Gordon	Mexico; Julian Ayala; Josue Morales; Jorge Antonio Rodriguez

=== Women ===
Event	Gold	Silver	Bronze
Individual Foil	(United States) Lee Kiefer	(Canada) Eleanor Harvey	(United States) Jacqueline Dubrovich
Individual Foil	(United States) Lee Kiefer	(Canada) Eleanor Harvey	(Canada) Jessica Guo
Individual Épée	(United States) Margherita Guzzi Vincenti	(United States) Hadley Husisian	(Paraguay) Montserrat Viveros
Individual Épée	(United States) Margherita Guzzi Vincenti	(United States) Hadley Husisian	(United States) Anne Cebula
Individual Sabre	(United States) Elizabeth Tartakovsky	(United States) Maia Chamberlain	(Canada) Pamela Brind'Amour
Individual Sabre	(United States) Elizabeth Tartakovsky	(United States) Maia Chamberlain	(United States) Tatiana Nazlymov
Team Foil	United States; Jacqueline Dubrovich; Lee Kiefer; Lauren Scruggs; Maia Mei Weintraub	Canada; Sabrina Fang; Jessica Zi Jia Guo; Eleanor Harvey; Yunjia Zhang	Brazil; Ana Beatriz Bulcao; Mariana Pistoia; Ana Toldo
Team Épée	Canada; Julia Yin; Malinka Montanaro; Leonora Mackinnon; Ruien Xiao	United States; Margherita Guzzi Vincenti; Katharine Holmes; Anne Cebula; Hadley Husisian	Argentina; Clara Isabel Di Tella; Tamara Chwojnik; Datev Nahapetyan; Juliana Borgarucci
Team Sabre	United States; Maia Chamberlain; Tatiana Nazlymov; Magda Skarbonkiewicz; Elizabeth Tartakovsky	Canada; Pamela Brind'Amour; Jun Liu; Julia Shi; Marissa Ponich	Argentina; Candela Belen Veloso; Alicia Perroni; Maria Belen Maurice

== Medal table ==
* Host nation (Peru)

Rank	Nation	Gold	Silver	Bronze	Total
1	United States	10	5	4	19
2	Canada	1	4	6	11
3	Venezuela	1	0	1	2
4	Brazil	0	1	3	4
5	Colombia	0	1	0	1
5	U.S. Virgin Islands	0	1	0	1
7	Argentina	0	0	2	2
8	Mexico	0	0	1	1
8	Paraguay	0	0	1	1
Totals (9 entries)		12	12	18	42
