= 2025 Pan American Fencing Championships =

Fencing championship in Rio de Janeiro, Brazil

- Host city: Rio de Janeiro, Brazil
- Dates: 24–29 June

The 2025 Pan American Fencing Championships were held in Rio de Janeiro, Brazil from June 24 to 29, 2025.

== Medal summary ==
=== Men ===
Event	Gold	Silver	Bronze
Individual Foil	Alexander Massialas; United States	Nick Itkin; United States	Gerek Meinhardt; United States
Individual Foil	Alexander Massialas; United States	Nick Itkin; United States	Augusto Antonio Servello; Argentina
Individual Épée	Tristan Szapary; United States	Rubén Limardo; Venezuela	Alexandre Camargo; Brazil
Individual Épée	Tristan Szapary; United States	Rubén Limardo; Venezuela	Samuel Imrek; United States
Individual Sabre	Colin Heathcock; United States	William Morrill; United States	Mitchell Saron; United States
Individual Sabre	Colin Heathcock; United States	William Morrill; United States	Antonio Heathcock; United States
Team Foil	United States; Nick Itkin; Gerek Meinhardt; Chase Emmer; Bryce Louie	Canada; Edward Li; Jason Yu; Borys Budovskyi; Adrian Wong	Chile; David Alarcon; Vicente Otayza Solari; Leopoldo Alarcon Roman; Juvenal Alarcon
Team Épée	Venezuela; Grabiel Lugo; Jesús Limardo; Rubén Limardo; Francisco Limardo	United States; Justin Yoo; Samuel Imrek; Tristan Szapary; Oleg Knysh	Canada; Nicholas Zhang; Fynn Fafard; Ruibo Leon Xiao; Dylan French
Team Sabre	United States; Colin Heathcock; William Morrill; Antonio Heathcock; Mitchell Saron	Canada; Fares Arfa; William Han; Olivier Desrosiers; Roman Norris	Colombia; Juan Pacheco; Emilio Vargas; Mario Palacios

=== Women ===
Event	Gold	Silver	Bronze
Individual Foil	Lee Kiefer; United States	Eleanor Harvey; Canada	Lauren Scruggs; United States
Individual Foil	Lee Kiefer; United States	Eleanor Harvey; Canada	Jaelyn Liu; United States
Individual Épée	Isabel Di Tella; Argentina	Ruien Xiao; Canada	Hadley Husisian; United States
Individual Épée	Isabel Di Tella; Argentina	Ruien Xiao; Canada	Catherine Nixon; United States
Individual Sabre	Maia Chamberlain; United States	Natalia Botello; Mexico	Siobhan Sullivan; United States
Individual Sabre	Maia Chamberlain; United States	Natalia Botello; Mexico	Isabela Carvalho; Brazil
Team Foil	United States; Lauren Scruggs; Emily Jing; Jaelyn Liu; Lee Kiefer	Canada; Yunjia Zhang; Eleanor Harvey; Savannah Locke; Nadia Hayes	Brazil; Gabriella Vianna; Bia Bulcão; Ana Toldo; Mariana Pistoia
Team Épée	United States; Catherine Nixon; Leehi Machulsky; Tierna Oxenreider; Hadley Husisian	Canada; Nicole Xuan; Ruien Xiao; Julia Yin; Leonora MacKinnon	Colombia; Isabella González; Carmen Correa; Valentina Triana; Laura Castillo
Team Sabre	United States; Lola Possick; Alexandra Lee; Siobhan Sullivan; Maia Chamberlain	Argentina; María Belén Pérez Maurice; Candela Espinosa Veloso; Maria Perroni; Catalina Borrelli	Colombia; María Blanco; Valentina Beltran; María Gutierrez; Ana Alderete

== Medal table ==
* Host nation (Brazil)

Rank	Nation	Gold	Silver	Bronze	Total
1	United States	10	3	9	22
2	Argentina	1	1	1	3
3	Venezuela	1	1	0	2
4	Canada	0	6	1	7
5	Mexico	0	1	0	1
6	Brazil*	0	0	3	3
6	Colombia	0	0	3	3
8	Chile	0	0	1	1
Totals (8 entries)		12	12	18	42
