= May Tieu =

American olympic fencer

May Lee Tieu
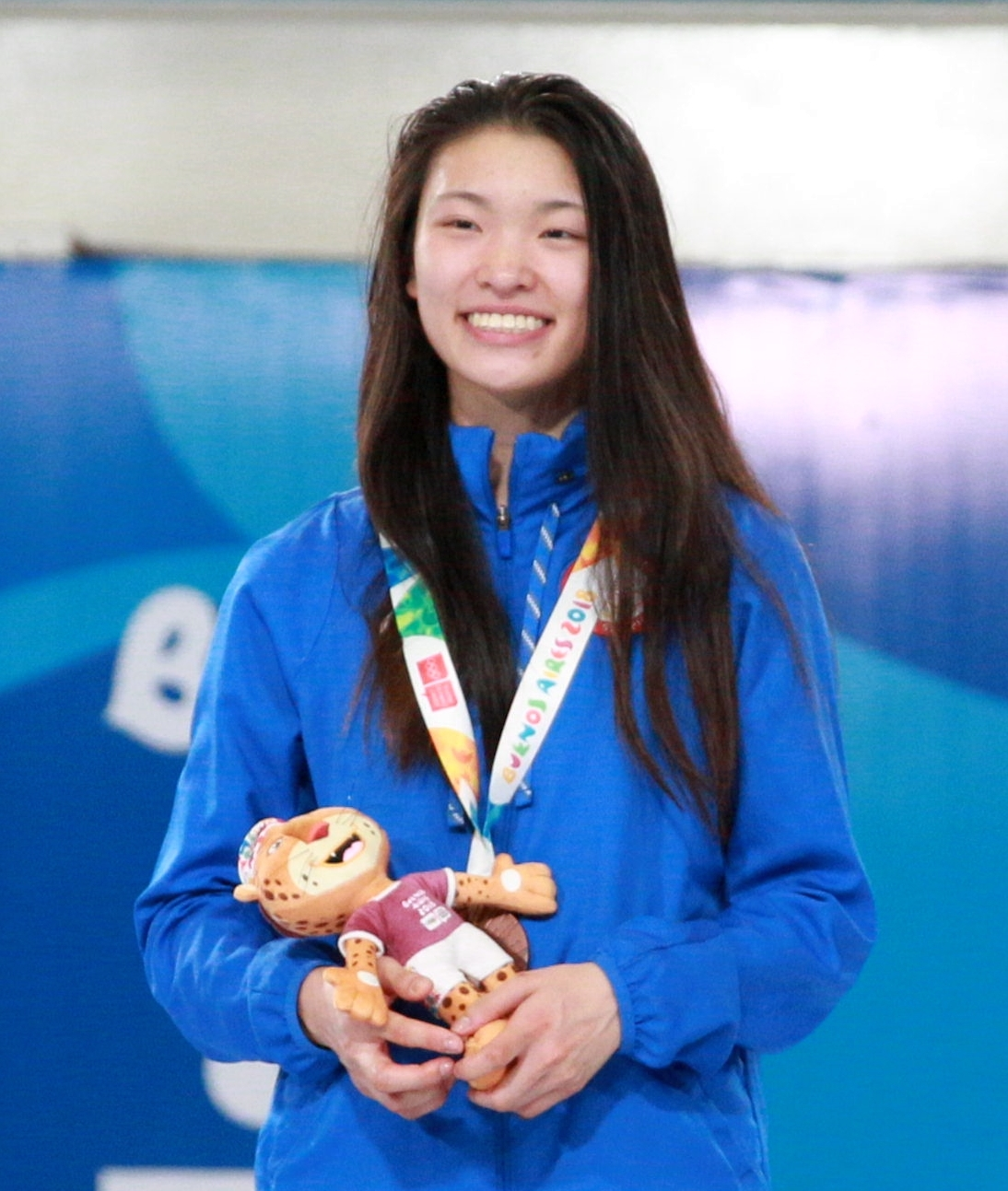
- Tieu in 2018

Sport
- Country: United States
- Sport: Fencing
Medal record
Women's foil
Representing United States
Youth Olympic Games
Bronze medal – third place	2018 Buenos Aires	Girls' foil
Junior World Championships
Gold medal – first place	2018 Verona	Team
Gold medal – first place	2021 Cairo	Individual
Silver medal – second place	2021 Cairo	Team
Cadets World Championships
Silver medal – second place	2018 Verona	Individual

May Lee Tieu is a Chinese-American Olympic foil fencer. She participated at the 2018 Summer Youth Olympics in the fencing competition, winning the bronze medal in the girls' foil event. At the 2021 World Cadets and Juniors Fencing Championships she won the gold medal in the individual foil, and bronze in the team foil. In 2019 she received the Jack Kelly Fair Play Award. As of April 2023, she has retired from competitive fencing. She graduated from Princeton University in 2023 and began working at Cornerstone Research in September 2023.
