= Mitchell Saron =

American fencer (born 2000)

Personal information
- Born: December 6, 2000 (age 25) Ridgewood, New Jersey, U.S.

Fencing career
- Sport: Fencing
- Country: United States
- Weapon: Sabre
- Hand: right-handed
Medal record
Men's sabre
Representing United States
World Championships
Bronze medal – third place	2023 Milan	Team
Pan American Championships
Gold medal – first place	2023 Lima	Team
Gold medal – first place	2024 Lima	Team
Gold medal – first place	2025 Rio de Janeiro	Team
Silver medal – second place	2024 Lima	Individual
Bronze medal – third place	2025 Rio de Janeiro	Individual
Junior World Championships
Bronze medal – third place	2018 Verona	Team
Bronze medal – third place	2019 Toruń	Individual
Bronze medal – third place	2019 Toruń	Team

Mitchell Saron (born December 6, 2000) is an American right-handed sabre fencer. He represented the United States at the 2024 Summer Olympics in Paris, France, competing in both the men's individual sabre and men's team sabre events.

== Early life ==
Saron was born on December 6, 2000, in Ridgewood, New Jersey, to a Filipino mother who moved from Guam at the age of 15, and to a Jewish-American father.

== Education ==
Saron attended Ridgewood High School in Ridgewood, New Jersey. He studied economics at Harvard University and graduated in 2023.

== Fencing career ==
In 2019, Saron won a gold medal in the team portion of the National Champion for the U.S. National Championships. In 2023, he was 14th at the Madrid Men's Sabre World Cup.

In 2024, Saron won a gold medal for the Men's Saber World Cup in the team's portion while he was representing Team USA.

Saron represented the United States at the 2024 Summer Olympics in Paris, France, finishing 14th in the men's individual sabre event on July 27 and 7th in the men's team sabre event on July 31, 2024.

== Medal record ==
=== World Championship ===
Date	Location	Event	Position
2023-07-27	Milan, Italy	Team Men's Sabre	3rd

=== World Cup ===
Date	Location	Event	Position
2024-03-24	Budapest, Hungary	Team Men's Sabre	1st
2025-03-08	Padua, Italy	Team Men's Sabre	2nd
2025-03-30	Budapest, Hungary	Team Men's Sabre	3rd

=== Pan American Championship ===
Date	Location	Event	Position
2023-06-20	Lima, Peru	Team Men's Sabre	1st
2024-06-27	Lima, Peru	Individual Men's Sabre	2nd
2024-06-30	Lima, Peru	Team Men's Sabre	1st
2025-06-26	Rio de Janeiro, Brazil	Individual Men's Sabre	3rd
2025-06-29	Rio de Janeiro, Brazil	Team Men's Sabre	1st

== See also ==
- List of Filipino American sportspeople
- List of select Jewish fencers
- List of USFA Division I National Champions
