= Alisa İsbir =

Turkish fencer (born 2005)

Personal information
- Born: 13 August 2005 (age 20) Ankara, Turkey

Sport
- Sport: Fencing
- Event: Foil
- Club: Spor Toto SK
Medal record
Women's Fencing
Representing Turkey
Islamic Solidarity Games
Gold medal – first place	2021 Konya	Foil team
Silver medal – second place	2021 Konya	Foil ind.
European Cadets and Juniors Championships
Silver medal – second place	2022 Novi Sad	Foil team Cadet
Bronze medal – third place	2022 Novi Sad	Foil ind. Cadet
European Cadet Circut
Silver medal – second place	2022 Poznań	Foil ind. Cadet
Gold medal – first place	2021 Samorin	Foil ind. Cadet

Alisa İsbir (born 13 August 2005) is a Turkish fencer who competes in the foil event.

== Sport career ==
İsbir competed for the fencing club Angora Pars ESK in Ankara, before she transferred to Spor Toto SK Fencing. She is left-handed.

In 2018, she became champion at the Turkish Youth Foil Fencing Championships in Ankara, and once again champion the same year at the Turkish U17 Fencing Championships.

She ranked fifth at the 2020 European Cadets and Juniors Fencing Championships in Poreč, Croatia.

She won the silver medal in the foil individual and the gold medal in the foil team event with Almila Birçe Durukan, Firuze Ayşen Güneş and İrem Karamete at the 2021 Islamic Solidarity Games in Konya, Turkey. She captured the gold medal in the foil individual event at the 2021 Cadet Circuit Samorin in Slovakia.

In January 2022, she won the Turkish Fencing Federation Cup in the foil girls' cadet individual event in Ankara. The same year, she received the silver medal in the foil individual event at the Cadet Circuit Poznań in Poland. She took the bronze medal in the foil women cadets individual, and the silver medal in the foil women cadets team event at the 2022 European Cadets and Juniors Fencing Championships in Novi Sad, Serbia. At the 2022 Mediterranean Games in Oran, Algeria, she competed in the foil individual and failed to advance from the quarterfinals.

== Personal life ==
Alisa İsbir was born on 13 August 2005.

She attendedthe private middle school MEV Koleji in Ankara. For her high school education, she enrolled in the private school ANKÜ, which is associated with Ankara University. After completing her secondary education, she entered Koç University in Istanbul to study General Economics.
