= Luca Szűcs =

Hungarian fencer (born 2001)

Personal information
- Born: 20 September 2002 (age 24) Budapest, Hungary

Fencing career
- Sport: Fencing
- Country: Hungary
- Weapon: Sabre
- Hand: Left-handed
- Club: BVSC-Zugló
- FIE ranking: current ranking
Medal record
Women's sabre
Representing Hungary
World Championships
Gold medal – first place	2022 Cairo	Team
Gold medal – first place	2023 Milan	Team
Gold medal – first place	2026 Hong Kong	Team
Bronze medal – third place	2025 Tbilisi	Team
European Games
Bronze medal – third place	2023 Kraków–Małopolska	Team
European Championships
Bronze medal – third place	2023 Kraków	Team
World Junior Championships
Gold medal – first place	2019 Toruń	Individual
Gold medal – first place	2023 Plovdiv	Team
Silver medal – second place	2022 Dubai	Team
European Junior Championships
Gold medal – first place	2020 Poreč	Team
Gold medal – first place	2022 Novi Sad	Team
Gold medal – first place	2023 Tallinn	Team
World Cadet Championships
Gold medal – first place	2019 Toruń	Individual
European Cadets Championships
Gold medal – first place	2019 Foggia	Team
Silver medal – second place	2018 Sochi	Team

Luca Szűcs (born 20 September 2002) is a Hungarian sabre fencer. She is a three-time world champion and won the women's team sabre events at the World Championships in 2022 and 2023. Szűcs is also a two-time junior world champion and three-time junior European champion. She represented Hungary at the 2024 Summer Olympics.

== Career ==
Szűcs got inspired to start fencing around age 10, after seeing the fencers' "shiny outfits and amazingly fast moves" at the 2012 Summer Olympics in London, England. Her club team is BVSC-Zugló in Budapest, where her coaches are István Bódy, and his son, Benjámin Bódy, while on the national level she is coached by Gábor Gárdos. She won her first international medals when she placed second in the team sabre event at the European Cadets Championships in 2018 and won the gold medal in the same event at the championships the following year. Szűcs won the gold medal in the individual sabre event at the Junior World Championships in 2019 and the team sabre event at the European Junior Championships in 2020.

Szűcs won her first international senior title at the 2022 World Championships, where she won the gold medal in the women's team sabre event. That same year, she won her second European junior team sabre title and placed second in the team sabre event at the Junior World Championships. Szűcs won the gold medal in the team sabre event at the 2023 World Championships, 2023 Junior World Championships and 2023 European Junior Championships. She represented Hungary in the women's sabre event and women's team sabre event at the 2024 Summer Olympics in Paris, France, where she reached the quarterfinals and finished sixth respectively.

== Medal record ==
=== World Championship ===
Date	Location	Event	Position
2025	(Georgia (country)) Tbilisi, Georgia	Team Women's Sabre	3rd
