= Iryna Shchukla =

Ukrainian-Turkish fencer (born 1995)

Personal information
- Full name: Iryna Shchukla Çiçek
- Nationality: Ukraine Turkey
- Born: Ukrainian: Ірина Щукла; 13 October 1995 (age 30) Podolsk, Ukraine

Sport
- Sport: Fencing
- Event: Sabre
- Club: Spor Toto SK
Medal record
Women's Fencing
Representing Ukraine
Representing Turkey
Islamic Solidarity Games
Gold medal – first place	2021 Konya	Sabre ind.

Iryna Shchukla Çiçek (born Ukrainian: Ірина Щукла; 13 October 1995) is a fencer who competes in the sabre event. Born in Ukraine, she represented her country in her youth years. After emigration, she competes for Turkey at international competitions.

== Sport career ==
=== Ukraine ===
Shchukla started her sport career by studying at Netishyn Fencing School, from where she graduated in 2013.

She won the silver medal in the girls' sabre team event with the Team I at the 2010 Ukrainian Juniors Open Fencing Championships in Mykolaiv. In November 2013, she took the bronze medal in the junior women's sabre individual event at the 2014–15 Fencing World Cup's leg in Dormagen, Germany. At the U23 European Fencing Championships in Tbilisi, Georgia in 2014, she received the bronze medal in the women's U23 sabre individual event. The same year, she became champion in the individual event at the Junior World Sabre Fencing Cup in Sosnowiec, Poland. In October 2014, she reached to a bronze medal at the 2014–15 Fencing World Cup (Tournoi satellite, Bursa), Turkey. In 2015, she became Ukrainian junior women's champion in sabre. At the XII Ukrainian University Games of 2015 in Lviv, she took the bronze medal. She competed at the 2015 Summer Universiade in Gwangju, South Korea, but failed to advance from 1/8 round.

=== Turkey ===
After compşeting her university education, Shchukla emigrated to Turkey, and joined the fencing club in Adıyaman, southeastern Anatolia.

In 2016, she became champion at the Turkish Open Seniors Sabre Tournament. At the U23 European Fencing Championships 2017, she ranked fifth in the individual event, while she and her team won the gold medal. The same year, she became Turkish champion at the Turkish Seniors Fencing Championships. In 2018, she received the bronze medal at the U23 European Championships in Yerevan, Armenia The same year at the 21st Flemish Open Fencing Championships in Ghent, Belgium, she won the silver medal in the individual event. At the 2019 Fencing World Cup's Satellite Plovdiv leg in Bulgaria, she became bronze medalist. She won the gold medal at the 2021 Islamic Solidarity Games in Konya, Turkey.

== Personal life ==
Iryna Shchukla was born in Podolsk, Ukraine, on 13 October 1995.

After studying in the Netishyn Fencing School, she attended the state university Khmelnytskyi National University, to be educated in the field of human health.
