= 2026 Pan American Fencing Championships =

Fencing championship in Lima, Peru

- Host city: Lima, Peru
- Dates: 15–20 June
- Main venue: Villa Deportiva Nacional

The 2026 Pan American Fencing Championships were held in Lima, Peru from June 15 to 20, 2026 at the Villa Deportiva Nacional.

== Medal summary ==
=== Men ===
Event	Gold	Silver	Bronze
Individual Foil	Alexander Massialas; United States	Marcello Olivares; United States	Vicente Otayza; Chile
Individual Foil	Alexander Massialas; United States	Marcello Olivares; United States	Guilherme Toldo; Brazil
Individual Épée	Gabriel Feinberg; United States	Jesus Andres Lugones Ruggeri; Argentina	Dylan French; Canada
Individual Épée	Gabriel Feinberg; United States	Jesus Andres Lugones Ruggeri; Argentina	Oleg Knysh; United States
Individual Sabre	William Morrill; United States	Colin Heathcock; United States	Eliecer Romero; Venezuela
Individual Sabre	William Morrill; United States	Colin Heathcock; United States	Darii Lukashenko; United States
Team Foil	United States; Nick Itkin; Alexander Massialas; Bryce Louie; Marcello Olivares	Canada; Borys Budovskyi; Adrian Wong; Xu Jia Bao; Jason Yu	Mexico; Diego Cervantes; Tommaso Archilei; Maximo Azuela; Maximo Murray
Team Épée	United States; Gabriel Feinberg; Elijah Imrek; Oleg Knysh; Ariel Simmons	Venezuela; Miguel Figueroa Moreno; Francisco Limardo; Jesus Limardo; Grabiel Lugo	Brazil; Alexandre Camargo; Nicolas Deguchi; Matheus Brandt; Leopoldo Gubert
Team Sabre	United States; Antonio Heathcock; Colin Heathcock; William Morrill; Darii Lukashenko	Canada; Roman Norris; Andrew Wei; Olivier Desrosiers; Mathis Falcon-Korb	Venezuela; Simon Duran Goyo; Marcel Medina Sanchez; Eliecer Romero; José Quintero

=== Women ===
Event	Gold	Silver	Bronze
Individual Foil	Eleanor Harvey; Canada	Carolina Stutchbury; United States	Lauren Scruggs; United States
Individual Foil	Eleanor Harvey; Canada	Carolina Stutchbury; United States	Lee Kiefer; United States
Individual Épée	Anna Van Brummen; United States	Hadley Husisian; United States	Nicole Xuan; Canada
Individual Épée	Anna Van Brummen; United States	Hadley Husisian; United States	Ruien Xiao; Canada
Individual Sabre	Natalia Botello; Mexico	Gabriela Hwang; Puerto Rico	Maria Alicia Perroni; Argentina
Individual Sabre	Natalia Botello; Mexico	Gabriela Hwang; Puerto Rico	Katherine Paredes Torres; Venezuela
Team Foil	United States; Josephina Conway; Jaelyn Liu; Lauren Scruggs; Carolina Stutchbury	Canada; Eleanor Harvey; Jessica Guo; Nadia Hayes; Yunjia Zhang	Brazil; Ana Beatriz Bulcao; Ana Toldo; Mariana Pistoia; Gabriella Vianna
Team Épée	United States; Hadley Husisian; Catherine Nixon; Charlene Liu; Tierna Oxenreider	Canada; Nicole Xuan; Julia Yin; Alexanne Verret; Ruien Xiao	Venezuela; Lizzie Asis; Maria Martinez; Eliana Lugo; Betyumil Posada
Team Sabre	United States; Maia Chamberlain; Sophie Liu; Lola Possick; Siobhan Sullivan	Argentina; Candela Belen Espinosa Veloso; Catalina Sol Borrelli; Maria Belen Perez Maurice; Maria Alicia Perroni	Mexico; Natalia Botello; Alejandra Beltran; Vanessa Chavez; Regina Pedraza

== Medal table ==
* Host nation (Peru)

Rank	Nation	Gold	Silver	Bronze	Total
1	United States	10	4	4	18
2	Canada	1	4	3	8
3	Mexico	1	0	2	3
4	Argentina	0	2	1	3
5	Venezuela	0	1	4	5
6	Puerto Rico	0	1	0	1
7	Brazil	0	0	3	3
8	Chile	0	0	1	1
Totals (8 entries)		12	12	18	42
