= Maria Boldor =

Romanian fencer (born 1996)

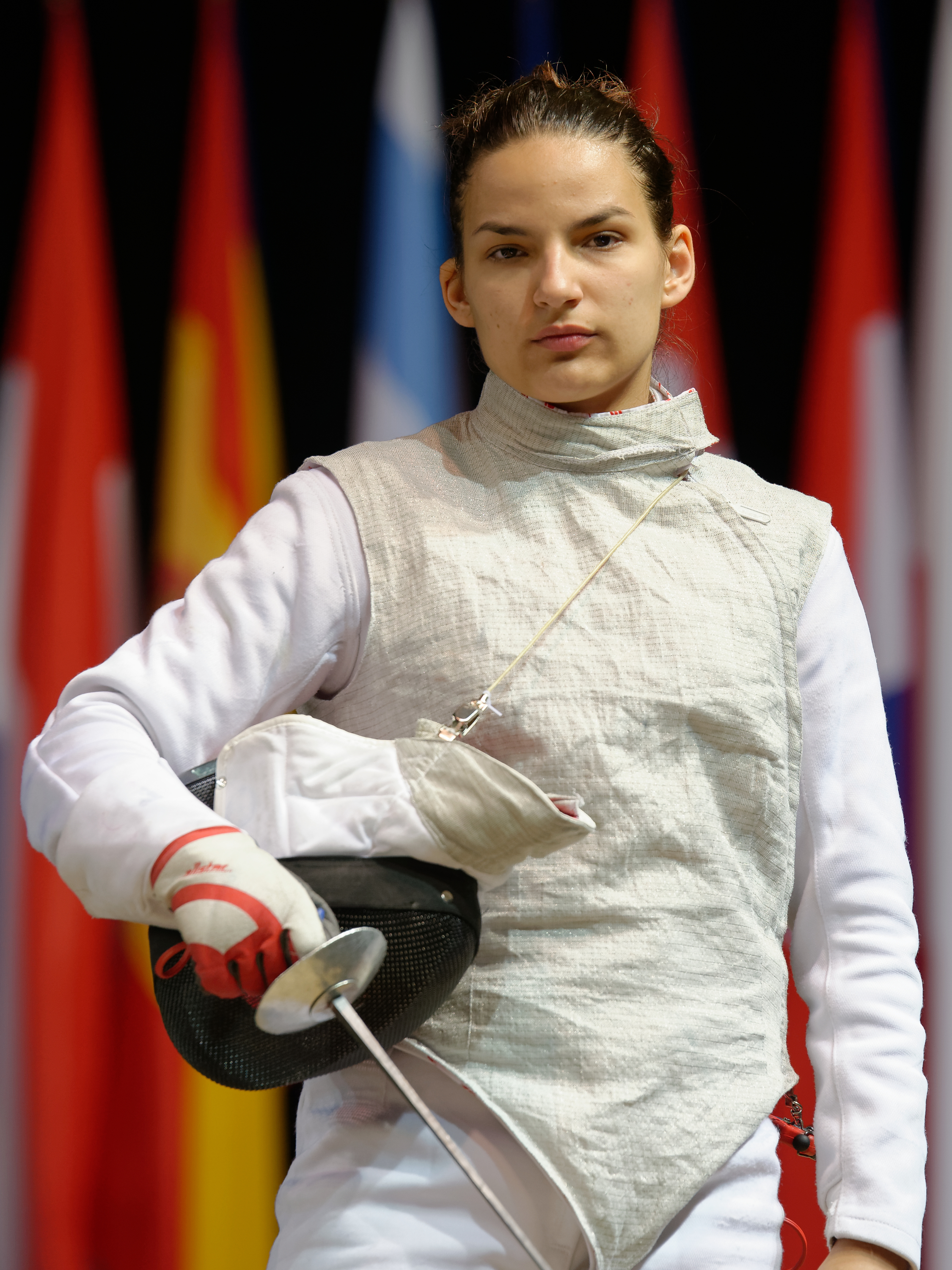
- Boldor at the 2014 European Fencing Championships

Personal information
- Born: 3 August 1996 (age 29)

Fencing career
- Sport: Fencing
- Country: Romania
- Weapon: Foil
- Hand: Right-handed
Medal record
Women's foil
Representing Romania
World Championships
Bronze medal – third place	2022 Cairo	Individual

Maria Boldor (born 3 August 1996) is a Romanian right-handed foil fencer. She won one of the bronze medals in the women's foil event at the 2022 World Fencing Championships held in Cairo, Egypt.

Boldor competed at the European Fencing Championships in 2013, 2014 and 2015. She represented Romania at the 2015 European Games held in Baku, Azerbaijan. She competed in the women's foil event.

In 2017, Boldor competed in the women's foil event at the World Fencing Championships held in Leipzig, Germany. In that same year, she also competed in the women's individual foil and women's team foil events at the 2017 Summer Universiade held in Taipei, Taiwan.

Boldor competed in the women's foil event at the 2019 World Fencing Championships held in Budapest, Hungary.
