= Alexandre Camargo =

Brazilian fencer (born 1999)

Personal information
- Full name: Alexandre Pereira de Camargo
- Born: 25 April 1999 (age 27) Curitiba, Brazil
- Height: 1.77 m (5 ft 10 in)
- Weight: 75 kg (165 lb; 11.8 st)

Fencing career
- Sport: Fencing
- Country: Brazil
- Weapon: épée
- FIE ranking: current ranking
Medal record
Men's fencing
Representing Brazil
Pan American Games
Silver medal – second place	2019 Lima	Team foil
Bronze medal – third place	2023 Santiago	Individual épée
Pan American Championships
Bronze medal – third place	2017 Montreal	Individual épée
Bronze medal – third place	2024 Lima	Team épée
Bronze medal – third place	2025 Rio de Janeiro	Individual épée
Bronze medal – third place	2026 Lima	Team épée
South American Games
Gold medal – first place	2026 Santa Fe	Team épée
Bronze medal – third place	2022 Asunción	Individual épée

Alexandre Pereira de Camargo (born 25 April 1999) is a Brazilian épée fencer.

== Career ==
In 2016, Camargo appeared as a great promise in Brazilian fencing, winning the Junior Pan-American Championship in épée.

He competed in the 2016 Summer Olympics.

In the 2017 Pan American Fencing Championships he won a bronze in the individual épee competition, at just 18 years old.

He participated at the 2019 Pan American Games held in Lima, Peru, where he won the silver medal in the Brazilian foil team, participating as a reserve. In the men's épée team, he finished 5th.

At the 2021 South American Fencing Championships, held in Lima, Peru, he obtained the silver medal in épée.

At the 2022 South American Games held in Asunción, Chile, he won a bronze medal in the individual épée.

Camargo was at the 2023 World Fencing Championships, held in Milan, Italy. He participated in the Brazilian men's épée team, which defeated Great Britain 44–40 in the first round, but in the 2nd phase, faced the powerful Italy, who would go on to become champions of the tournament, losing 44–21.

Camargo won a bronze medal in the men's épée event at the 2023 Pan American Games in Santiago, Chile. In the quarter-finals, he defeated Colombia's Jhon Rodríguez, who was ranked 10th in the world at the time. The result was reported as Brazil's best finish in the event since Arthur Cramer's performance at the 1967 Pan American Games in Winnipeg.
