= 2007 World Cadets and Juniors Fencing Championships =

2007 Junior World Fencing Championships
- Dates: 10–18 April 2007
- Host city: Belek, Turkey
- Venue: Belek Convention Center
- Events: 18

The 2007 World Juniors and Cadets Fencing Championships was held in Belek, Antalya, Turkey between April 10 and April 18, 2007. The event, an organization of the Federation Internationale d'Escrime (FIE), was carried out by the Turkish Fencing Federation (TEF). Junior and cadet fencers from 53 countries competed in the categories foil, épée and sabre in the championship. Russia was the most successful nation, followed by Ukraine and Italy.

== Venue ==
Belek, a town in Antalya Province, is one of the most prominent centers of Turkey's tourism. The competitions took place in Maritim Pine Beach Hotel, aka Belek Convention Center.

== Medal table ==
2007 World Juniors and Cadets Fencing Championships
| Pos | Country | Gold | Silver | Bronze | Total |
|---|---|---|---|---|---|
| 1 | Russia | 5 | 5 | 1 | 11 |
| 2 | Ukraine | 3 | 0 | 2 | 5 |
| 3 | Italy | 2 | 4 | 5 | 11 |
| 4 | France | 2 | 1 | 3 | 6 |
| 5 | Germany | 2 | 1 | 0 | 3 |
| 6 | United States | 1 | 1 | 4 | 6 |
| 7 | Sweden | 1 | 0 | 1 | 2 |
| 8 | Spain | 1 | 0 | 0 | 1 |
| 9 | Japan | 1 | 0 | 0 | 1 |
| 10 | Hungary | 0 | 2 | 3 | 5 |
| 11 | South Korea | 0 | 2 | 0 | 2 |
| 12 | China | 0 | 1 | 3 | 4 |
| 13 | Switzerland | 0 | 1 | 0 | 1 |
| 14 | Canada | 0 | 0 | 2 | 2 |
| 14 | Norway | 0 | 0 | 2 | 2 |
| 14 | Poland | 0 | 0 | 2 | 2 |
| 17 | Romania | 0 | 0 | 1 | 1 |
| 17 | Tunisia | 0 | 0 | 1 | 1 |
| | Total | 18 | 18 | 30 | 66 |
