= Darii Lukashenko =

Ukrainian-American fencer

Personal information
- Nationality: Ukrainian

Fencing career
- Sport: Fencing
- Country: United States
- Weapon: Sabre
- Hand: Right-handed
Medal record
Men's sabre
Representing the United States
Pan American Championships
Gold medal – first place	2026 Lima	Team
Bronze medal – third place	2026 Lima	Individual

Darii Lukashenko (Ukrainian: Дарій Лукашенко) is a Ukrainian-American right-handed sabre fencer.

== Early life and education ==
Lukashenko was born in Ukraine and is the son of former fencer Volodymyr Lukashenko.

He attends St. John's University where he is a member of the fencing team. During the 2024–25 season, in his freshman year, he won the individual sabre National Championship.

== Career ==
In 2023, USA Fencing granted Russians living in the United States the right to compete in American competitions if they signed a declaration against the Russian invasion of Ukraine. On the Fourth of July weekend in 2023, Russian Olympian Konstantin Lokhanov, who had moved to the United States as he opposed the war, won the gold medal in the individual men's sabre competition at the United States Summer National Championships. Lukashenko and Lokhanov embraced and held the Ukrainian flag together to express their support for Ukrainians during the Russian invasion.

In June 2026, he competed at the 2026 Pan American Fencing Championships and won a gold medal in the team sabre event and a bronze medal in the individual sabre event.

== Medal record ==
=== World Cup ===
Date	Location	Event	Position
2026-11-13	Cairo, Egypt	Individual Men's Sabre	3rd
