= Fencing at the 2018 Summer Youth Olympics – Girls' foil =

2018 Summer Youth Olympics was held at the Africa Pavilion on 7 October

Girls' foil at the III Summer Youth Olympic Games
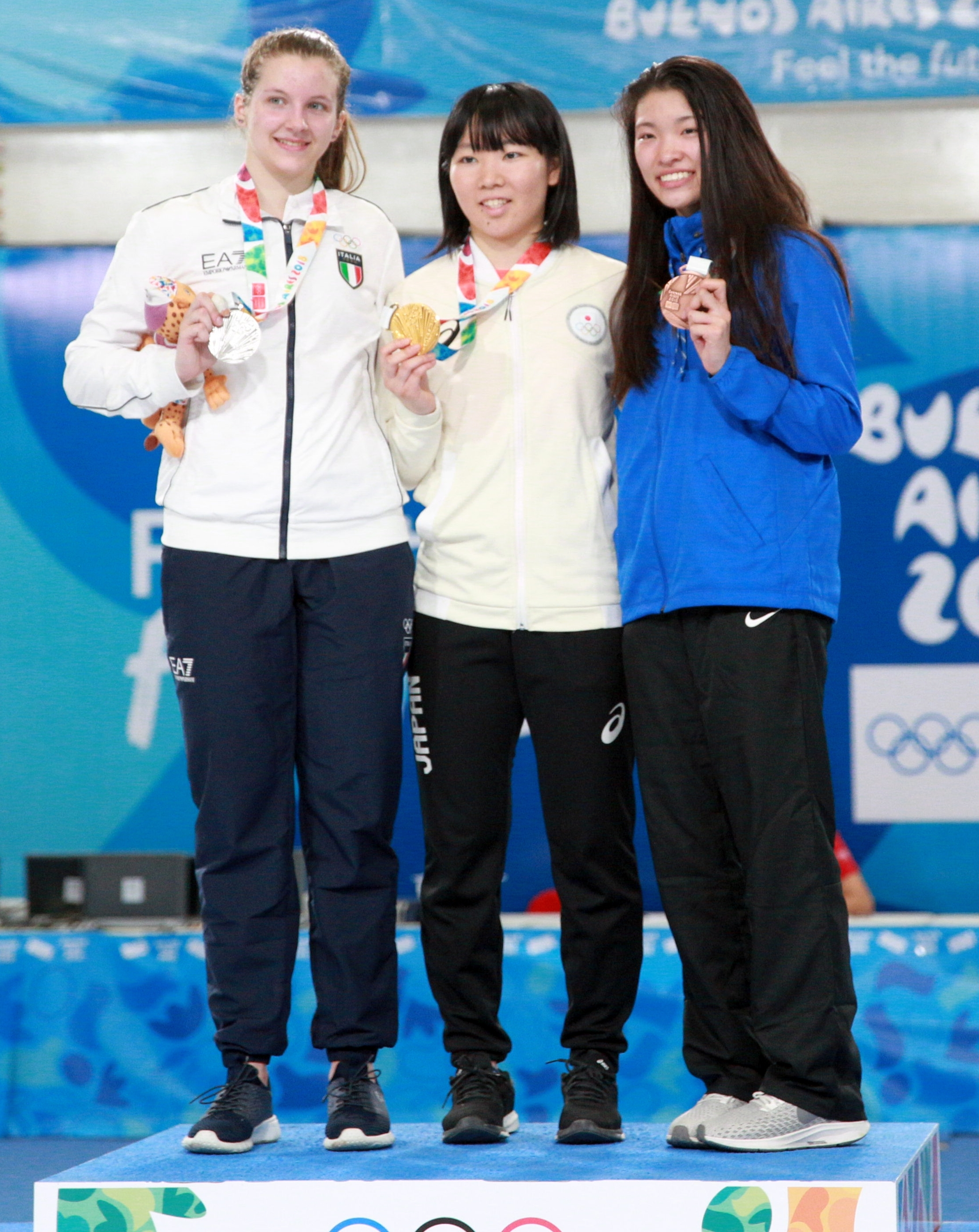
- medal ceremony
- Venue: Africa Pavilion
- Dates: 7 October
- Competitors: 14 from 14 nations

Medalists
1st place, gold medalist(s)		Yuka Ueno	Japan
2nd place, silver medalist(s)		Martina Favaretto	Italy
3rd place, bronze medalist(s)		May Tieu	United States

The girls' foil competition at the 2018 Summer Youth Olympics was held at the Africa Pavilion in Argentina on 7 October.

== Results ==
=== Pool round ===
==== Pool 1 ====
Rank	Athlete	(Hong Kong)	(France)	(Japan)	(Romania)	(Venezuela)	(Australia)	(Egypt)	V#	B#	Ind.	HG	HR	Diff.
4	Christelle Joy Ko (HKG)		V	1	4	V	3	V	3	6	0.500	23	21	+2
5	Venissia Thépaut (FRA)	1		3	2	0	V	V	2	6	0.333	16	24	−8
1	Yuka Ueno (JPN)	V	V		V	V	V	V	6	6	1.000	30	6	+24
3	Rebeca Cândescu (ROU)	V	V	1		3	V	V	4	6	0.667	24	23	+1
2	Anabella Acurero (VEN)	2	V	0	V		V	V	4	6	0.667	22	17	+5
7	Giorgia Salmas (AUS)	V	2	0	3	1		2	1	6	0.167	13	28	−15
6	Noha Hany (EGY)	3	2	1	4	3	V		1	6	0.167	18	27	−9

==== Pool 2 ====
Rank	Athlete	(Italy)	(Poland)	(China)	(Hungary)	(Togo)	(Canada)	(United States)	V#	B#	Ind.	HG	HR	Diff.
1	Martina Favaretto (ITA)		V	V	V	V	V	3	5	6	0.833	28	11	+17
6	Magdalena Ławska (POL)	1		0	3	V	2	1	1	6	0.167	12	25	−13
4	Fu Yingying (CHN)	2	V		V	V	3	1	3	6	0.500	21	16	+5
5	Karolina Zsoldosi (HUN)	1	V	1		V	4	0	2	6	0.333	16	25	−9
7	Grâce Senyo (TOG)	0	0	0	2		1	2	0	6	0.000	5	30	−25
3	Jane Caulfield (CAN)	2	V	V	V	V		V2	5	6	0.833	24	16	+8
2	May Tieu (USA)	V	V	V	V	V	1		5	6	0.833	26	9	+17

=== Bracket ===
Round of 16
1
16
9	Venissia Thépaut (FRA)	6
8	Christelle Joy Ko (HKG)	8
5	Anabella Acurero (VEN)	15
12	Magdalena Ławska (POL)	9
13	Giorgia Salmas (AUS)	8
4	Jane Caulfield (CAN)	15
3	May Tieu (USA)	15
14	Grâce Senyo (TOG)	1
11	Noha Hany (EGY)	15
6	Rebeca Cândescu (ROU)	11
7	Fu Yingying (CHN)	15
10	Karolina Zsoldosi (HUN)	10
15
2

Quarterfinals
1	Yuka Ueno (JPN)	13
8	Christelle Joy Ko (HKG)	3
5	Anabella Acurero (VEN)	14
4	Jane Caulfield (CAN)	5
3	May Tieu (USA)	15
11	Noha Hany (EGY)	3
7	Fu Yingying (CHN)	11
2	Martina Favaretto (ITA)	15

Semifinals
1	Yuka Ueno (JPN)	8
5	Anabella Acurero (VEN)	4
3	May Tieu (USA)	5
2	Martina Favaretto (ITA)	15

Final
1	Yuka Ueno (JPN)	15
2	Martina Favaretto (ITA)	12
Third place
5	Anabella Acurero (VEN)	7
3	May Tieu (USA)	8

== Final standings ==
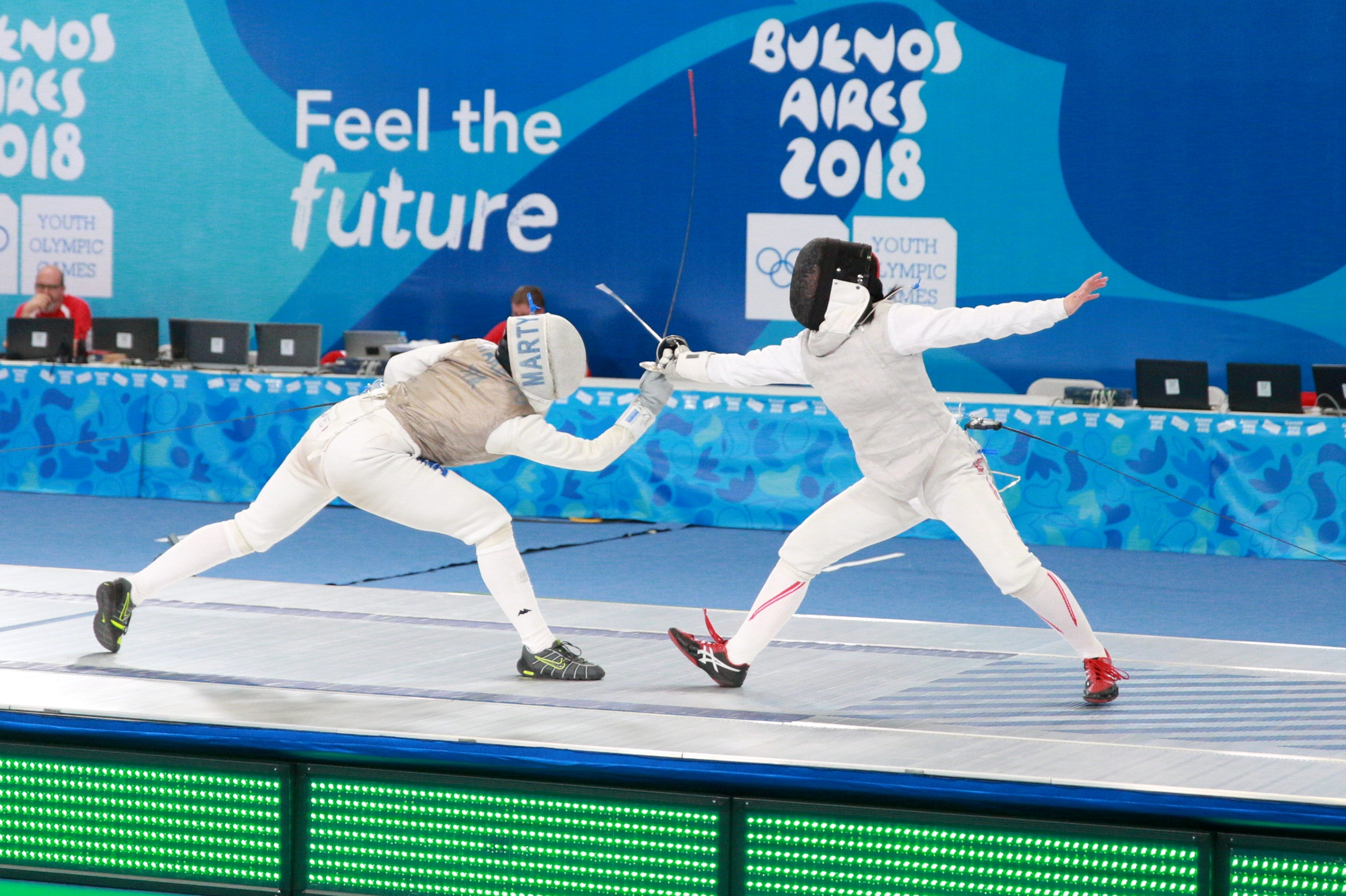
Martina Favaretto (left) and Yuka Ueno (right) fight for Gold

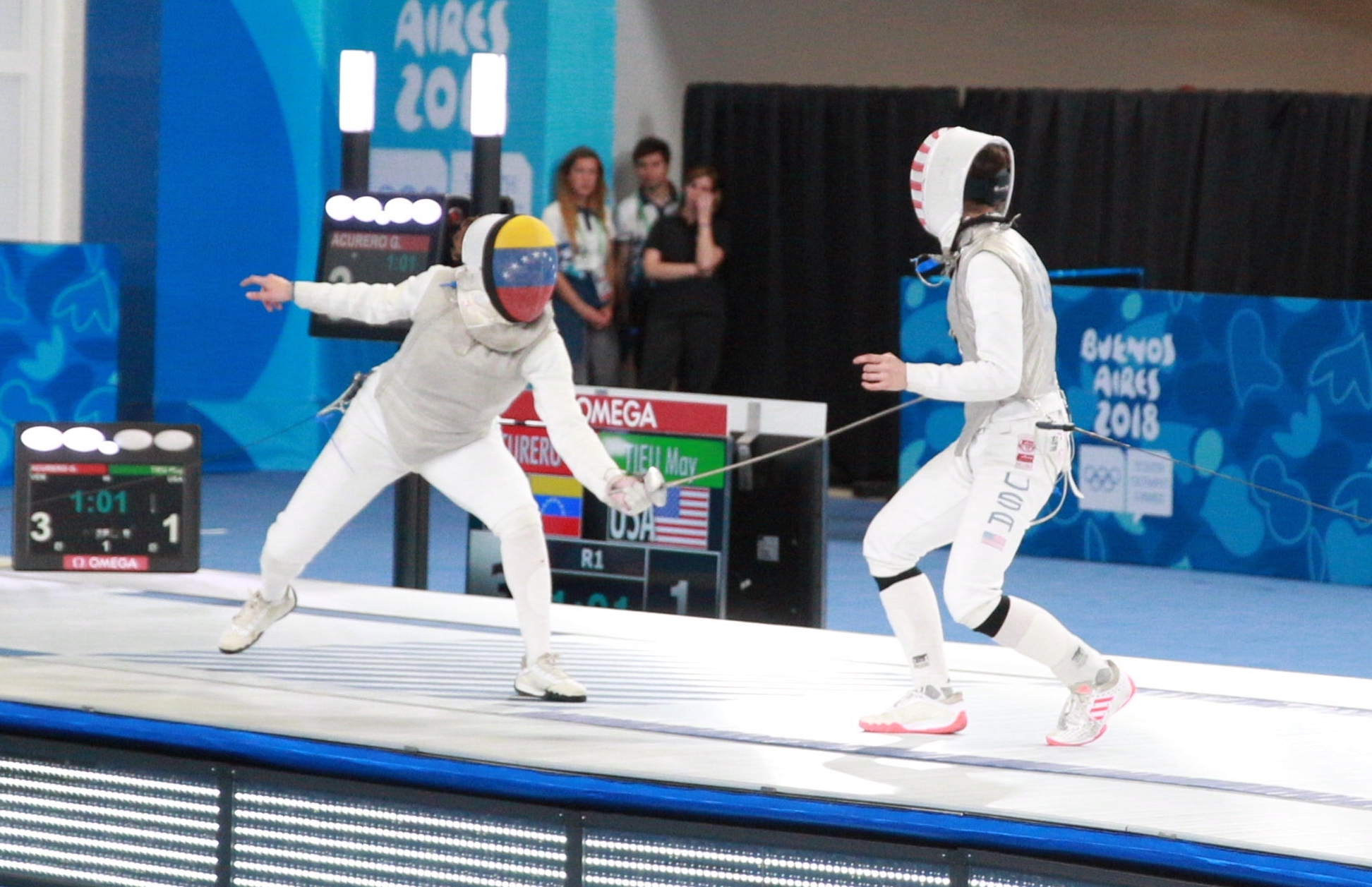
Anabella Acurero (left) and May Tieu (right) fight for Bronze

Rank	Athlete
1st place, gold medalist(s)	Yuka Ueno (JPN)
2nd place, silver medalist(s)	Martina Favaretto (ITA)
3rd place, bronze medalist(s)	May Tieu (USA)
4	Anabella Acurero (VEN)
5	Jane Caulfield (CAN)
6	Fu Yingying (CHN)
7	Christelle Joy Ko (HKG)
8	Noha Hany (EGY)
9	Rebeca Cândescu (ROU)
10	Venissia Thépaut (FRA)
11	Karolina Zsoldosi (HUN)
12	Magdalena Ławska (POL)
13	Giorgia Salmas (AUS)
14	Grâce Senyo (TOG)
