= Fencing at the 2023 Pan American Games – Men's épée =

Men's épée at the 2023 Pan American Games
- Venue: Paralympic Training Center
- Dates: October 30
- Competitors: 19 from 10 nations

Medalists
Gold medal	Dylan French	Canada
Silver medal	Pablo Núñez	Chile
Bronze medal	Francisco Limardo	Venezuela
Bronze medal	Alexandre Camargo	Brazil

The men's épée competition of the fencing events at the 2023 Pan American Games was held on October 30 at the Paralympic Training Center.

The épée competition consisted of a qualification round followed by a single-elimination bracket with a bronze medal match between the two semifinal losers. Fencing was done to 15 touches or to the completion of three three-minute rounds if neither fencer reached 15 touches by then. At the end of time, the higher-scoring fencer was the winner; a tie resulted in an additional one-minute sudden-death time period. This sudden-death period was further modified by the selection of a draw-winner beforehand; if neither fencer scored a touch during the minute, the predetermined draw-winner won the bout.

== Schedule ==
Date	Time	Round
October 30, 2023	09:00	Qualification pools
October 30, 2023	12:10	Round of 16
October 30, 2023	14:20	Quarterfinals
October 30, 2023	16:00	Semifinals
October 30, 2023	18:10	Final

== Results ==
The following are the results of the event.

=== Qualification ===
All 18 fencers were put into three groups of six athletes, were each fencer would have five individual matches. The top 14 athletes overall would qualify for next round.

Rank	Name	Nation	Victories	TG	TR	Dif.	Notes
1	Pablo Nuñez	Chile	4	23	17	+6	Q
2	Francisco Limardo	Venezuela	4	17	14	+3	Q
3	Dylan French	Canada	4	19	17	+2	Q
4	Alexandre Camargo	Brazil	4	28	21	+7	Q
5	Jhon Édison Rodríguez	Colombia	4	27	20	+7	Q
6	Yordan Ferrer	Cuba	4	27	24	+3	Q
7	Curtis McDowald	United States	4	27	25	+2	Q
8	Samuel Imrek	United States	3	21	16	+5	Q
9	Fabrizio Lazzarotto	Brazil	3	19	16	+3	Q
10	Rubén Limardo	Venezuela	3	12	11	+1	Q
11	Joaquín Bustos	Chile	3	21	25	-4	Q
12	Hernando Roa	Colombia	2	17	15	+2	Q
13	Nicholas Zhang	Canada	2	17	16	+1	Q
14	Dariel Carrión	Cuba	2	17	19	-2	Q
15	Jesús Lugones Ruggeri	Argentina	2	16	21	-5	Q
16	Jorge Valderrama Bugueño	Chile	1	16	24	-8	Q
17	Eduardo García Biel	Peru	1	23	27	-4	
18	Alessandro Taccani	Argentina	1	17	28	-11	
19	Pablo Florido	Mexico	0	16	24	-8	

=== Elimination round ===
Round of 16
1	Pablo Nuñez (CHI)	15
16	Jorge Valderrama Bugueño (CHI)	9
9	Fabrizio Lazzarotto (BRA)	15
8	Samuel Imrek (USA)	14
5	Jhon Édison Rodríguez (COL)	15
12	Hernando Roa (COL)	10
13	Nicholas Zhang (CAN)	8
4	Alexandre Camargo (BRA)	15
3	Dylan French (CAN)	15
14	Dariel Carrión (CUB)	10
11	Joaquín Bustos (CHI)	15
6	Yordan Ferrer (CUB)	14
7	Curtis McDowald (USA)	14
10	Rubén Limardo (VEN)	12
15	Jesús Lugones Ruggeri (ARG)	8
2	Francisco Limardo (VEN)	9

Quarterfinals
1	Pablo Nuñez (CHI)	15
9	Fabrizio Lazzarotto (BRA)	10
5	Jhon Édison Rodríguez (COL)	7
4	Alexandre Camargo (BRA)	15
3	Dylan French (CAN)	15
11	Joaquín Bustos (CHI)	11
7	Curtis McDowald (USA)	13
2	Francisco Limardo (VEN)	15

Semifinals
1	Pablo Nuñez (CHI)	15
4	Alexandre Camargo (BRA)	14
3	Dylan French (CAN)	15
2	Francisco Limardo (VEN)	5

Final
1	Pablo Nuñez (CHI)	12
3	Dylan French (CAN)	15
