= Women's team foil at the 2026 World Fencing Championships =

- Venue: AsiaWorld–Expo
- Location: Hong Kong
- Dates: 30 July
- Competitors: 99 from 26 nations
- Teams: 26

Medalists
| gold medal | Martina Batini; Anna Cristino; Arianna Errigo; Martina Favaretto | Italy |
| silver medal | Josephina Conway; Jaelyn Liu; Lauren Scruggs; Carolina Stutchbury | United States |
| bronze medal | Sera Azuma; Komaki Kikuchi; Sumire Tsuji; Yuka Ueno | Japan |

The Women's team foil competition at the 2026 World Fencing Championships was held on 30 July 2026.

== Draw ==
=== Finals ===
Semifinals
Italy | 45
Japan | 19
France | 23
United States | 45

Final
Italy | 45
United States | 29
Third place
Japan | 34
France | 31

=== Top half ===
==== Section 1 ====
Round of 32
Israel | 45
Egypt | 42
China | 45
Philippines | 36
Macau | 24
Hungary | 45

Round of 16
Italy | 45
Israel | 18
China | 22
Hungary | 35

Quarterfinals
Italy | 45
Hungary | 25

==== Section 2 ====
Round of 32
Kazakhstan | 16
Russia | 45
Hong Kong | 45
Venezuela | 14

Round of 16
Spain | 42
Russia | 45
Hong Kong | 27
Japan | 45

Quarterfinals
Russia | 17
Japan | 31

=== Bottom half ===
==== Section 3 ====
Round of 32
Great Britain | 28
Poland | 45
South Korea | 45
Australia | 28

Round of 16
France | 43
Poland | 32
South Korea | 29
Canada | 40

Quarterfinals
France | 45
Canada | 38

==== Section 4 ====
Round of 32
Ukraine | 45
Tunisia | 21
India | 15
Germany | 45
Singapore | 45
Chile | 30

Round of 16
Ukraine | 33
Germany | 29
Singapore | 29
United States | 45

Quarterfinals
Ukraine | 25
United States | 36

=== Placement rounds ===
==== 5–8th place bracket ====
5–8th place semifinals
Hungary | 43
Russia | 42
Canada | 36
Ukraine | 33

Fifth place
Hungary | 40
Canada | 38
Seventh place
Russia | 45
Ukraine | 33

==== 9–16th place bracket ====
9–16th place quarterfinals
Israel | 29
China | 39
Spain | 45
Hong Kong | 38
Poland | 45
South Korea | 31
Germany | 45
Singapore | 32

9–12th place semifinals
China | 34
Spain | 44
Poland | 43
Germany | 44

Ninth place
Spain | 45
Germany | 28
Eleventh place
China | 27
Poland | 32

==== 13–16th place bracket ====
13–16th place semifinals
Israel | 42
Hong Kong | 43
South Korea | 45
Singapore | 18

13th place
Hong Kong
South Korea | w/o
15th place
Israel | 36
Singapore | 44

== Final ranking ==
| Rank | Team |
|---|---|
| 1st place, gold medalist(s) | Italy |
| 2nd place, silver medalist(s) | United States |
| 3rd place, bronze medalist(s) | Japan |
| 4 | France |
| 5 | Hungary |
| 6 | Canada |
| 7 | Russia |
| 8 | Ukraine |
| 9 | Spain |
| 10 | Germany |
| 11 | Poland |
| 12 | China |
| 13 | South Korea |
| 14 | Hong Kong |
| 15 | Singapore |
| 16 | Israel |
| 17 | Egypt |
| 18 | Chile |
| 19 | Great Britain |
| 20 | Venezuela |
| 21 | Kazakhstan |
| 22 | Australia |
| 23 | India |
| 24 | Philippines |
| 25 | Macau |
| 26 | Tunisia |
