= Artem Sarkisyan =

Artem Sarkisovich Sarkisyan (Russian: Артём Саркисович Саркисян; September 23, 1926, Nagorno-Karabakh - November 11, 2016, Moscow) was a Russian oceanographer, Doctor of Sciences, Academician of the Russian Academy of Sciences (since 1992), Distinguished Professor at the Lomonosov Moscow State University (since 1999), Head of Laboratory at the Shirshov Institute of Oceanology, Chief Researcher at the Institute of Numerical Mathematics, RAS. Laureate of the 1970 USSR State Prize and of the 2000 State Prize of the Russian Federation.

== Education ==
He graduated from the Baku State University in 1950. He also studied at the A.M. Obukhov Institute of Atmospheric Physics of the Russian Academy of Sciences. He was a student of Iliá Kíbel. In 1953, he defended his Candidate's Dissertation. In 1967, he defended his doctoral dissertation. In 1968, he received the title of Professor.

== Career ==
He was elected a corresponding member of the Academy of Sciences of the USSR in 1981. In 1986, he was awarded the Order of Friendship of Peoples. He's co-author of monograph: Modelling Ocean Climate Variability (Springer, 2009).
