= Hadley Husisian =

American épée fencer

Personal information
- Born: July 26, 2003 (age 23) Oakton, Virginia, U.S.

Fencing career
- Sport: Fencing
- Country: United States
- Weapon: Épée
- FIE ranking: 14 (women's épée)
Medal record
Women's épée
Representing the United States
Pan American Championships
Gold medal – first place	2025 Rio de Janeiro	Team
Gold medal – first place	2026 Lima	Team
Silver medal – second place	2024 Lima	Individual
Silver medal – second place	2024 Lima	Team
Silver medal – second place	2026 Lima	Individual
Bronze medal – third place	2025 Rio de Janeiro	Individual
Junior World Championships
Gold medal – first place	2022 Dubai	Individual
Gold medal – first place	2023 Plovdiv	Individual
Silver medal – second place	2023 Plovdiv	Team
Bronze medal – third place	2022 Dubai	Team

Hadley Husisian (/hjuːˈsɪsiən/ hew-SISS-ee-ən; born July 26, 2003) is an American épée fencer. Currently, she competes for Princeton University, where she has earned All-American honors and won the 2023 Ivy League Women's Épée Championship. Husisian is also a long-standing member of Team USA and qualified for the 2024 Summer Olympics in Paris, where she finished twelfth. Prior to the Olympics, Husisian earned back-to-back individual gold medals at the 2022 Dubai and 2023 Plovdiv Junior World Championships, while also earning bronze (2022) and silver (2023) medals in the Junior Women's Épée team events as a member of Team USA.

== Career ==
Hadley Husisian began fencing at the age of ten, inspired by a character on the TV show "iCarly" who participated in the sport. This portrayal sparked her interest in fencing, leading her to pursue it more seriously, getting involved with fencing clubs in the DMV area. At this time, Husisian trained about 30 hours a week. Coached by Guillermo Madrigal, she had success in the cadet division (under-17), winning three national gold medals and a silver. These achievements helped her secure a spot on the U.S. Junior National Team. She became the Junior Women's Épée World Champion in 2022, marking her as the first American to win this title since 2008. She successfully defended her title the following year in the Plovdiv Junior World Championships, becoming the only U.S. épée fencer—male or female—to win two Junior World Championships.

Husisian competed in college at Princeton University, where she received All-American honors, finished third at the 2023 NCAA Championships and won the Ivy League Women's Épée Championship. She was selected to compete at the 2024 Summer Olympics. At the 2024 Summer Olympics, Husisian placed twelfth in the Women's Épée Individual Event and seventh in the Women's Épée Team Event.

== Personal life ==
Beyond her achievements in fencing, Hadley Husisian is involved in charitable activities and community service. She started a "Ton of Food" drive, which successfully collected 6,271 pounds of food and over a thousand dollars in monetary donations. Husisian promoted the drive by distributing flyers in local neighborhoods and arranging contactless pickups, with a goal to reach ten tons of donations.

From a young age, Husisian has been an avid reader. She gave a TedxYouth Talk, "Are Readers An Endangered Species: Hadley Husisian," as a 5th grader, when she was the "number 1 book-checker-outer" for 2 consecutive years at the Flint Hill School.

== Medal record ==
=== Grand Prix ===
Date	Location	Event	Position
2024-01-29	Doha, Qatar	Individual Women's Épée	3rd
2025-05-09	Bogotá, Colombia	Individual Women's Épée	2nd

=== World Cup ===
Date	Location	Event	Position
2024-11-10	Fujairah, United Arab Emirates	Team Women's Épée	3rd
2025-03-27	Marrakesh, Morocco	Individual Women's Épée	3rd
2025-05-25	Wuxi, China	Team Women's Épée	3rd
2026-01-08	Fujairah, United Arab Emirates	Individual Women's Épée	3rd
2026-01-11	Fujairah, United Arab Emirates	Team Women's Épée	1st
2026-05-22	St-Maur, France	Individual Women's Épée	2nd

=== Pan American Championship ===
Year	Location	Event	Position
2024	Lima, Peru	Individual Women's Épée	2nd
2024	Lima, Peru	Team Women's Épée	2nd
2025	Rio de Janeiro, Brazil	Individual Women's Épée	3rd
2025	Rio de Janeiro, Brazil	Team Women's Épée	1st
2026	Lima, Peru	Individual Women's Épée	2nd
2026	Lima, Peru	Team Women's Épée	1st
