= Colin Heathcock =

American fencer (born 2005)

Personal information
- Full name: Colin Yang Siqi Heathcock
- Nationality: American
- Born: December 20, 2005 (age 20) Beijing, China

Fencing career
- Sport: Fencing
- Country: United States
- Weapon: Sabre
- Hand: right-handed
- Club: Christian Bauer Academy
- Head coach: Christian Bauer
Medal record
Men's sabre
Representing the United States
World Championships
Bronze medal – third place	2023 Milan	Team
Pan American Championships
Gold medal – first place	2023 Lima	Team
Gold medal – first place	2025 Rio de Janeiro	Individual
Gold medal – first place	2025 Rio de Janeiro	Team
Gold medal – first place	2026 Lima	Team
Silver medal – second place	2026 Lima	Individual
Junior World Championships
Gold medal – first place	2023 Plovdiv	Individual
Gold medal – first place	2023 Plovdiv	Team
Gold medal – first place	2024 Riyadh	Team
Gold medal – first place	2025 Wuxi	Team
Representing Germany
Junior World Championships
Gold medal – first place	2022 Dubai	Individual

Colin Yang Siqi Heathcock (December 20, 2005) is an American right-handed sabre fencer. He represented the United States at the 2024 Summer Olympics.

== Early life and education ==
Heathcock was born to Virgil Heathcock and Julie Yang in Beijing, China and raised in Palo Alto, California. He has an older brother, Antonio, who is also a fencer. By 13 years old, Heathcock was competing internationally representing Germany, where his father has dual citizenship. In 2019, he moved to Orléans, France where sabre coach Christian Bauer was opening an academy.

Heathcock is currently a sophomore at Harvard University where he is a member of the collegiate fencing team.

== Career ==
Heathcock represented Germany at the 2022 Junior World Championships and won a gold medal in the individual sabre event. In 2022, he decided to switch his national team to the United States.

In April 2023 he represented the United States at the 2023 Junior Fencing World Championships and won a gold medal in the individual and team sabre events. In June 2023 he represented the United States at the 2023 Pan American Fencing Championships and won a gold medal in the team sabre event. In July 2023 he represented the United States at the 2023 World Fencing Championships and won a bronze medal in the men's team sabre, team USA's first ever World Fencing Championships medal in the event. He finished the 2022–23 season as the world's No. 1 ranked junior men's saber fencer.

In January 2024 he won gold at the Tunis Grand Prix. In March 2024 he won gold at the Padua Senior Men's Saber World, his second gold in the last three FIE senior tournaments. At 18 years old, he became the youngest ever men's sabre fencer to win multiple senior level international competitions in a season. In April 2024 he represented the United States at the 2024 Junior Fencing World Championships and won a gold medal in the team sabre event.

In March 2024 he was named to team USA's roster to compete at the 2024 Summer Olympics. During the men's sabre event, Heathcock was upset by Park Sang-won of Korea in the round of 32.

== Medal record ==
=== World Championship ===
Date	Location	Event	Position
2023-07-27	Milan, Italy	Team Men's Sabre	3rd

=== Grand Prix ===
Date	Location	Event	Position
2024-01-13	Tunis, Tunisia	Individual Men's Sabre	1st
2024-05-04	(South Korea) Seoul, Korea	Individual Men's Sabre	3rd
2024-12-06	Orléans, France	Individual Men's Sabre	2nd

=== World Cup ===
Date	Location	Event	Position
2024-03-01	Padua, Italy	Individual Men's Sabre	1st
2024-03-24	Budapest, Hungary	Team Men's Sabre	1st
2025-01-26	Plovdiv, Bulgaria	Team Men's Sabre	2nd
2025-03-30	Budapest, Hungary	Team Men's Sabre	3rd
2025-11-06	Alger, Algeria	Individual Men's Sabre	1st
2026-01-25	(United States) Salt Lake City, United states	Team Men's Sabre	2nd
2026-05-22	Cairo, Egypt	Individual Men's Sabre	2nd
2026-10-15	Oran, Algeria	Individual Men's Sabre	3rd

=== Pan American Championship ===
Date	Location	Event	Position
2023-06-20	Lima, Peru	Team Men's Sabre	1st
2025-06-26	Rio de Janeiro, Brazil	Individual Men's Sabre	1st
2025-06-29	Rio de Janeiro, Brazil	Team Men's Sabre	1st
2026-06-15	Lima, Peru	Individual Men's Sabre	2nd
2026-06-18	Lima, Peru	Team Men's Sabre	1st
