= Anna Cristino =

Italian fencer (born 2001)

Personal information
- Born: 28 December 2001 (age 24) Turin, Italy

Fencing career
- Sport: Fencing
- Country: Italy
- Weapon: Foil
- Hand: Left-handed
- Club: CS Carabinieri
- Head coach: Alessandro Puccini
Medal record
Women's foil
Representing Italy
World Championships
Gold medal – first place	2026 Hong Kong	Team
Bronze medal – third place	2025 Tbilisi	Individual
Bronze medal – third place	2025 Tbilisi	Team
European Championships
Gold medal – first place	2025 Genoa	Team
Gold medal – first place	2026 Antony	Team

Anna Cristino (born 28 December 2001) is an Italian left-handed foil fencer. She won a bronze medal in the women's foil event at the 2025 World Fencing Championships.

== Career ==
On 19 April 2024, Cristino earned her first World Cup podium finish, winning a bronze medal.

In June 2025, Cristino competed at the 2025 European Fencing Championships and won a gold medal in the team event. The next month she competed at the 2025 World Fencing Championships and won a bronze medal in the individual foil event.
