= Jaelyn Liu =

American fencer (born 2009)

Personal information
- Born: March 12, 2009 (age 17) Plano, Texas, U.S.
- Height: 1.70 m (5 ft 7 in)
- Weight: 60 kg (132 lb)

Fencing career
- Sport: Fencing
- Country: United States
- Weapon: Foil
- Hand: Right-handed
- Club: Star Fencing Academy
Medal record
Women's foil
Representing the United States
World Championships
Gold medal – first place	2025 Tbilisi	Team
Silver medal – second place	2026 Hong Kong	Team
Pan American Championships
Gold medal – first place	2025 Rio de Janeiro	Team
Gold medal – first place	2026 Lima	Team
Bronze medal – third place	2025 Rio de Janeiro	Individual
Junior World Championships
Gold medal – first place	2025 Wuxi	Individual
Gold medal – first place	2025 Wuxi	Team
Gold medal – first place	2026 Rio de Janeiro	Individual
Bronze medal – third place	2026 Rio de Janeiro	Team
Cadet World Championships
Gold medal – first place	2024 Riyadh	Individual
Gold medal – first place	2025 Wuxi	Individual
Gold medal – first place	2026 Rio de Janeiro	Individual

Jaelyn Liu (born March 12, 2009) is an American right-handed foil fencer. She won gold medals in World Championships and Junior and Cadet World Championships at the same year (2025), becoming the first and youngest American won the world champion in foil history. At the 2026 Junior & Cadet World Championships, she once again captured both the Junior and Cadet individual titles, becoming the first American fencer in history to win gold in both categories at two separate World Championships.

== Medal record ==
=== World Championship ===
Year	Location	Event	Position
2025	(Georgia (country)) Tbilisi, Georgia	Team Women's Foil	1st

=== World Cup ===
Date	Location	Event	Position
2025-01-10	Hong Kong, China	Individual Women's Foil	1st
2025-03-09	Cairo, Egypt	Team Women's Foil	2nd
2025-05-04	Vancouver, Canada	Team Women's Foil	2nd
2025-11-09	Palma de Mallorca, Spain	Team Women's Foil	2nd
2025-12-07	(South Korea) Busan, Korea	Team Women's Foil	2nd
2026-01-11	Hong Kong, China	Team Women's Foil	3rd

=== Pan American Championship ===
Year	Location	Event	Position
2025	Rio de Janeiro, Brazil	Individual Women's Foil	3rd
2025	Rio de Janeiro, Brazil	Team Women's Foil	1st
2026	Lima, Peru	Team Women's Foil	1st
