= Dylan French =

Canadian fencer (born 1997)

Personal information
- Nationality: Canada
- Born: May 16, 1997 (age 29) Surrey, British Columbia
- Home town: Richmond, British Columbia

Sport
- Sport: Fencing
- College team: University of Notre Dame
Medal record
Men's fencing
Representing Canada
Pan American Fencing Championships
Bronze medal – third place	2025 Rio de Janeiro	Team
Bronze medal – third place	2026 Lima	Individual
Pan American Games
Gold medal – first place	2023 Santiago	Epée
Silver medal – second place	2023 Santiago	Team épée
World Junior Fencing Championships
Bronze medal – third place	2014 Plovdiv	Epée

Dylan French (born May 16, 1997) is a Canadian fencer. French was a Pan American Games champion when he won gold in the individual épée at the 2023 Pan Am Games in Santiago, as well as a silver in the men's team épée.

== Career ==
French started fencing at the age of eight with the Dynamo Fencing Club in Richmond, British Columbia, and started fencing competitively in the sport at the age of 11. He went on to the 2014 World Junior Fencing Championships where he won a bronze medal in the cadet men's individual épée. French served as Team Canada’s Opening Ceremony flag bearer at the 2014 Youth Olympic Games in Nanjing.

French competed at the 2019 World Fencing Championships as part of the men's team épée competition. He first started competing individually in the men's épée at the 2022 World Fencing Championships and again at the 2023 World Championships.

French then led the Canadian fencing team into the 2023 Pan American Games where he won gold in the individual men's épée. This was Canada's first ever Canadian men's épée gold at the Pan American Games and the first individual fencing gold since the 2011 Pan American Games. French followed up his historic gold by helping the team win silver in the men's team épée competition.

== Personal ==
He graduated from the Mendoza College of Business at University of Notre Dame in 2019. As of 2023, he worked for a financial technology company.
