= Lauren Scruggs (fencer) =

American fencer (born 2003)

Personal information
- Full name: Lauren Skye Scruggs
- Born: January 27, 2003 (age 23) Queens, New York, U.S.

Fencing career
- Sport: Fencing
- Country: United States
- Weapon: Foil
- Hand: Left-handed
- Club: Peter Westbrook Foundation, Fencers Club
- Head coach: Sean McClain
- FIE ranking: 4 (women's foil, August 2024)
Medal record
Women's foil
Representing United States
Olympic Games
Gold medal – first place	2024 Paris	Team
Silver medal – second place	2024 Paris	Individual
World Championships
Gold medal – first place	2025 Tbilisi	Team
Silver medal – second place	2026 Hong Kong	Team
Pan American Championships
Gold medal – first place	2024 Lima	Team
Gold medal – first place	2025 Rio de Janeiro	Team
Gold medal – first place	2026 Lima	Team
Silver medal – second place	2023 Lima	Team
Bronze medal – third place	2023 Lima	Individual
Bronze medal – third place	2025 Rio de Janeiro	Individual
Bronze medal – third place	2026 Lima	Individual
Junior World Championships
Gold medal – first place	2018 Verona	Team
Gold medal – first place	2019 Toruń	Individual
Gold medal – first place	2022 Dubai	Individual
Gold medal – first place	2022 Dubai	Team
Gold medal – first place	2023 Plovdiv	Team
Silver medal – second place	2021 Cairo	Team
Silver medal – second place	2023 Plovdiv	Individual
Bronze medal – third place	2018 Verona	Individual

Lauren Skye Scruggs (born January 27, 2003) is an American left-handed foil fencer. Scruggs won a silver medal in women's individual foil at the 2024 Summer Olympics, making her the first Black American woman to win an individual fencing medal. She also won a gold medal in women's team foil at the same Olympics, along with Lee Kiefer, Jackie Dubrovich, and Maia Weintraub. Scruggs competes for the Harvard Crimson team in collegiate fencing. She has won an NCAA championship and is one of three black fencers from the United States to have won an individual world championship.

== Early life and education ==
Scruggs grew up in Queens, New York. She was inspired to start fencing as a 6-year-old, after her older brother joined a fencing club in Brooklyn. She attended Packer Collegiate Institute, graduating in 2021. Her older brother Nolen fenced at Columbia University.

She graduated from Harvard University in 2025 with a degree in philosophy.

== Career ==
Scruggs is a two-time champion in the Junior World Fencing Championships, winning individual gold medals in 2019 and 2022 as well as other individual and team awards in 2018, 2021, and 2023. In 2023, she earned an individual gold medal at the NCAA Fencing Championships in Durham, North Carolina, and contributed to a fourth-place team finish for Harvard. In June 2023, she took bronze at the Pan American Fencing Championships in Lima.

=== 2024 Summer Olympics ===
On March 17, 2024, Scruggs qualified for the Paris Olympic Games by earning bronze at the Absolute Fencing Gear FIE Grand Prix in Washington, D.C.

At the Games, she won the silver medal in the women's foil event, defeating Italian fencer Arianna Errigo and Canadian fencer Eleanor Harvey, among others, before losing 15–6 in the final to fellow American Lee Kiefer. This made Scruggs the first Black American woman to win an individual fencing medal at the Olympics. She also won a gold medal in the team competition.

== Personal life ==
Scruggs is openly lesbian and currently dating a Harvard classmate. She is involved with the Peter Westbrook Foundation, which offers fencing lessons to children and teens who are members of underrepresented groups. By qualifying for the Paris Olympics, she became the 17th Olympian produced by this foundation.

== Medal record ==
=== Olympic Games ===
Year	Location	Event	Position
2024	Paris, France	Individual Women's Foil	2nd
2024	Paris, France	Team Women's Foil	1st

=== World Championship ===
Year	Location	Event	Position
2025	(Georgia (country)) Tbilisi, Georgia	Team Women's Foil	1st

=== Grand Prix ===
Date	Location	Event	Position
2026-03-21	Lima, Peru	Individual Women's Foil	2nd

=== World Cup ===
Date	Location	Event	Position
2024-12-07	(South Korea) Busan, korea	Team Women's Foil	2nd
2025-01-12	Hong Kong, China	Team Women's Foil	2nd
2025-05-04	Vancouver, Canada	Team Women's Foil	2nd
2025-11-09	Palma de Mallorca, Spain	Team Women's Foil	2nd
2025-12-05	(South Korea) Busan, Korea	Individual Women's Foil	3rd
2025-12-07	(South Korea) Busan, Korea	Team Women's Foil	2nd
2026-01-11	Hong Kong, China	Team Women's Foil	3rd
2026-04-19	Cairo, Egypt	Team Women's Foil	3rd
2026-11-12	Plovdiv, Bulgaria	Individual Women's Foil	3rd

=== Pan American Championship ===
Year	Location	Event	Position
2023	Lima, Peru	Individual Women's Foil	3rd
2023	Lima, Peru	Team Women's Foil	2nd
2024	Lima, Peru	Team Women's Foil	1st
2025	Rio de Janeiro, Brazil	Individual Women's Foil	3rd
2025	Rio de Janeiro, Brazil	Team Women's Foil	1st
2026	Lima, Peru	Individual Women's Foil	3rd
2026	Lima, Peru	Team Women's Foil	1st

== See also ==
- List of USFA Division I National Champions
- List of NCAA fencing champions
