= Josephina Conway =

American fencer (born 2004)

Personal information
- Born: March 8, 2004 (age 22)

Fencing career
- Sport: Fencing
- Country: United States
- Weapon: Foil
- Hand: Left-handed
Medal record
Women's foil
Representing the United States
World Championships
Silver medal – second place	2026 Hong Kong	Team
Pan American Championships
Gold medal – first place	2026 Lima	Team

Josephina Conway (born March 8, 2004) is an American left-handed foil fencer.

== Early life and education ==
Conway attended John Adams High School in South Bend, Indiana. She then attended the University of Notre Dame where she was a member of the fencing team. She helped Notre Dame win the NCAA fencing championships women's team championship in 2026.

== Career ==
In June 2026, she represented the United States at the 2026 Pan American Fencing Championships and won a gold medal in the team foil event.
