= Alon Sarid =

Israeli fencer

Personal information
- Born: 2005 or 2006 (age 20–21)

Sport
- Country: Israel
- Sport: Fencing
Medal record
Representing Israel
Men's fencing
European Championships
Silver medal – second place	2026 Antony	Individual

Alon Sarid (born 2005/2006) is an Israeli fencer. He competed at the 2026 European Fencing Championships, winning the silver medal in the men's épée event.
