= Martina Favaretto =

Italian fencer (born 2001)

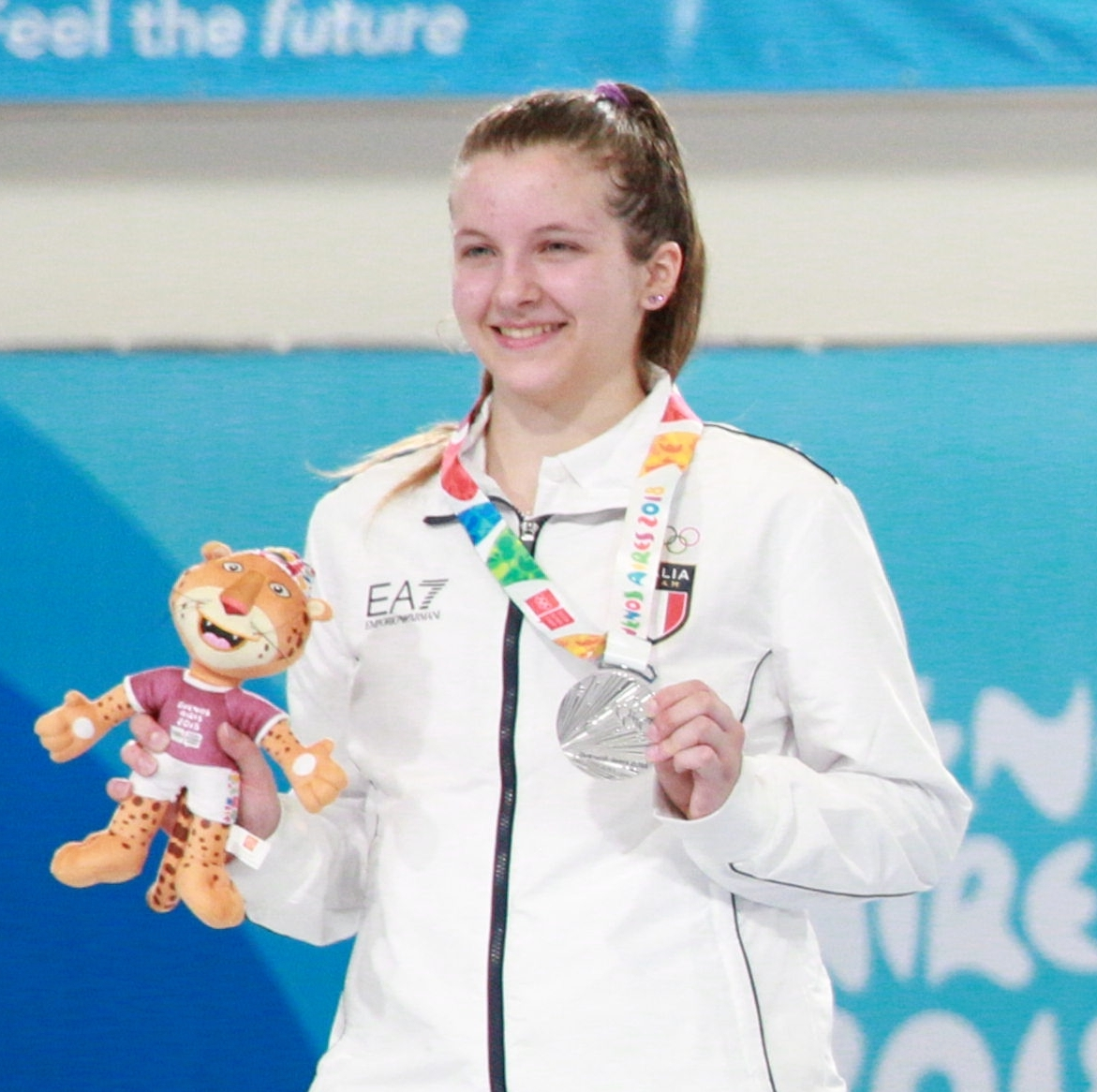
- Favaretto at the 2018 Summer Youth Olympics

Personal information
- Born: 15 November 2001 (age 24) Camposampiero, Veneto, Italy

Fencing career
- Sport: Fencing
- Country: Italy
- Weapon: Foil
- Hand: Right-handed
- FIE ranking: Current ranking
Medal record
Women's foil
Representing Italy
Olympic Games
Silver medal – second place	2024 Paris	Team
World Championships
Gold medal – first place	2022 Cairo	Team
Gold medal – first place	2023 Milan	Team
Gold medal – first place	2026 Hong Kong	Individual
Gold medal – first place	2026 Hong Kong	Team
Bronze medal – third place	2023 Milan	Individual
Bronze medal – third place	2025 Tbilisi	Individual
Bronze medal – third place	2025 Tbilisi	Team
European Games
Gold medal – first place	2023 Kraków–Małopolska	Team
European Championships
Gold medal – first place	2022 Antalya	Team
Gold medal – first place	2023 Kraków	Team
Gold medal – first place	2024 Basel	Team
Gold medal – first place	2026 Antony	Team
Silver medal – second place	2023 Plovdiv	Individual
Youth Olympic Games
Silver medal – second place	2018 Buenos Aires	Individual
Women's fencing
Representing (International Olympic Committee) Mixed-NOCs
Youth Olympic Games
Gold medal – first place	2018 Buenos	Mixed team

Martina Favaretto (born 15 November 2001) is an Italian fencer.

Her fascination with fencing started at the age of 7, when she saw Matteo Tagliariol win the gold at the 2008 Summer Olympics. At 13 she started being coached by Olympic champion Mauro Numa.

She won one of the bronze medals in the women's foil event at the 2023 World Fencing Championships held in Milan, Italy. She won the silver medal in her event at the 2023 European Fencing Championships held in Plovdiv, Bulgaria. Favaretto is also a gold medalist in the women's team foil event at the 2022 World Fencing Championships and the 2022 European Fencing Championships.

In 2018, Favaretto won the silver medal in the girls' foil event at the Summer Youth Olympics held in Buenos Aires, Argentina. She also won the gold medal in the mixed team event.

Favaretto, Martina Batini, Francesca Palumbo and Alice Volpi won the gold medal in the women's team foil event at the 2023 European Games held in Poland. She competed at the 2024 European Fencing Championships held in Basel, Switzerland, and also won two gold medals at the 2026 World Fencing Championships in Hong Kong and became the no. 1 in the world.

== Medal record ==
=== Olympic Games ===
Year	Location	Event	Position
2024	Paris, France	Team Women's Foil	2nd
