= Alina Poloziuk =

Ukrainian fencer (born 2002)

Personal information
- Born: 5 May 2002 (age 24) Mykolaiv, Ukraine

Fencing career
- Sport: Fencing
- Country: Ukraine
- Weapon: Foil
- Hand: Right-handed
Medal record
Women's foil
Representing Ukraine
World Championships
Bronze medal – third place	2026 Hong Kong	Individual
European Championships
Bronze medal – third place	2026 Antony	Team

Alina Poloziuk (Ukrainian: Аліна Євгенівна Полозюк, born 5 May 2002, Mykolaiv) is a Ukrainian right-handed foil fencer.

== Career ==
In June 2026, she competed at the 2026 European Fencing Championships and won a bronze medal in the team event. This was the first medal for Ukraine at the European Fencing Championships in the event.
