= Turkish Fencing Federation =

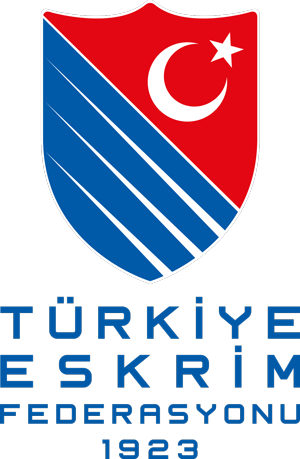
- Sport: Fencing
- Jurisdiction: Turkey
- Abbreviation: TFF
- Founded: 1923
- Affiliation: FIE
- Affiliation date: 1923
- Regional affiliation: CEE
- Affiliation date: 1923
- Headquarters: Ulus, Ankara, Turkey
- President: Abdurrahman Karataş

Official website
- www.eskrim.org.tr
- (Turkey)

The Turkish Fencing Federation (Turkish: Türkiye Eskrim Federasyonu) is the governing body for the sport of fencing in Turkey. It was founded in 1923. In 1924, Turkish fencers began to attend the Olympic Games. Every year, fencing tournaments are held by TFF.

The Turkish Fencing Federation is affiliated to the international International Fencing Federation and European Fencing Confederation.

The federation in 2011 had 2500 fencers.
