= Carolina Stutchbury =

American-British fencer (born 2005)

Personal information
- Born: October 23, 2005 (age 20)

Fencing career
- Sport: Fencing
- Country: USA
- Weapon: Foil
- Hand: Right-handed
Medal record
Women's foil
Representing the United States
World Championships
Silver medal – second place	2026 Hong Kong	Team
Pan American Championships
Gold medal – first place	2026 Lima	Team
Silver medal – second place	2026 Lima	Individual
Representing Great Britain
European Championships
Silver medal – second place	2025 Genoa	Individual
Bronze medal – third place	2024 Basel	Individual
Junior World Fencing Championships
Bronze medal – third place	2022 Dubai	Individual

Carolina Stutchbury (born October 23, 2005) is an American-British right-handed foil fencer.

== Early life and education ==
Stutchbury was raised in London and moved to Atlanta when she was 11 years old.

She attends Columbia University where she is a member of the collegiate fencing team. During the 2024–25 season, she was named a first team All-American after tying for the bronze medal at the NCAA fencing championships. She was also named women's foil Newcomer of the Year by the United States Fencing Coaches Association.

== Career ==
In April 2022, Stutchbury competed at the 2022 Junior and Cadet Fencing World Championships and won a bronze medal the Junior World Championships, and a silver medal at that year's Cadet World Championships. She competed at the 2024 European Fencing Championships and won a bronze medal in the individual event. She again competed at the 2025 European Fencing Championships and won a silver medal in the individual foil event. She became the first British woman to win a senior European Fencing Championships silver medal.

On September 30, 2025, Stutchbury transferred from Great Britain to USA Fencing. In June 2026, she competed at the 2026 Pan American Fencing Championships and won a gold medal in the team foil event and a silver medal in the individual foil event.
