= 2016 Pan American Fencing Championships =

The 2016 Pan American Fencing Championships were being held at the Convention Center Vasco Nuñez de Balboa in Panama City from 21 to 26 June 2016. The event was organized by the Pan American Fencing Confederation and the National Fencing Association of Panama.

== Medal summary ==
=== Men's events ===
Event	Gold	Silver	Bronze
Foil	Alexander Massialas (USA)	Daniel Gómez (MEX)	Race Imboden (USA); Miles Chamley-Watson (USA)
Team Foil	United States; Race Imboden; Alexander Massialas; Gerek Meinhardt; David Willette	Brazil; Henrique Marques; Ghislain Perrier; Fernando Scavasin; Guilherme Toldo	Canada; Marc-Antoine Brodeur; Mikhail Sweet; Maximilien Van Haaster
Épée	Yunior Reytor (CUB)	Jason Pryor (USA)	Reynier Henríquez Ortiz (CUB); Maxime Brinck-Croteau (CAN)
Team Épée	Venezuela; Kelvin Cañas; Silvio Fernández; Francisco Limardo; Rubén Limardo	Cuba; Reynier Henríquez Ortiz; Luis Enrique Patterson; Ringo Quintero Álvarez; Yunior Reytor Venet	Colombia; Andrés Felipe Campos Zárate; Gustavo Coqueco; Michael Lozano; Jhon Édison Rodríguez
Sabre	Renzo Agresta (BRA)	Andrew Mackiewicz (USA)	Eli Dershwitz (USA); José Félix Quintero (VEN)
Team Sabre	United States; Eli Dershwitz; Daryl Homer; Andrew Mackiewicz; Jeff Spear	Argentina; Ricardo Bustamante; Pascual Di Tella; Martín Lora Grünwaldt; Stefano Ivan Lucchetti	Mexico; Adrian Acuña Ramirez; Julián Ayala; Héctor Florencia; Javier Alejandro Hernández Flores

=== Women's events ===
Event	Gold	Silver	Bronze
Foil	Lee Kiefer (USA)	Nicole Ross (USA)	Alanna Goldie (CAN); Kelleigh Ryan (CAN)
Team Foil	United States; Lee Kiefer; Sabrina Massialas; Nzingha Prescod; Nicole Ross	Canada; Shannon Comerford; Alanna Goldie; Eleanor Harvey; Kelleigh Ryan	Mexico; Alely Hernández; Victoria Meza; Nataly Michel; Melissa Rebolledo
Épée	Kelley Hurley (USA)	María Martínez (VEN)	Courtney Hurley (USA); Katharine Holmes (USA)
Team Épée	Canada; Malinka Hoppe Montanaro; Vanessa Lacas-Warrick; Leonora Mackinnon; Brittany Mark-Larkin	United States; Katharine Holmes; Courtney Hurley; Kelley Hurley; Katarzyna Trzopek	Brazil; Rayssa Costa; Katherine Miller; Nathalie Moellhausen; Amanda Simeão
Sabre	Ibtihaj Muhammad (USA)	Mariel Zagunis (USA)	Paola Pliego (MEX); Belén Pérez Maurice (ARG)
Team Sabre	United States; Monica Aksamit; Ibtihaj Muhammad; Dagmara Wozniak; Mariel Zagunis	Mexico; Tania Arrayales; Úrsula González; Paola Pliego; Julieta Toledo	Canada; Pamela Brind'Amour; Rachel Lamarre; Gabriella Page; Marissa Ponich

== Medal table ==
Rank	Nation	Gold	Silver	Bronze	Total
1	United States	8	5	5	18
2	Canada	1	1	5	7
3	Brazil	1	1	1	3
3	Cuba	1	1	1	3
3	Venezuela	1	1	1	3
6	Mexico	0	2	3	5
7	Argentina	0	1	1	2
8	Colombia	0	0	1	1
Totals (8 entries)		12	12	18	42
