= 2017 Pan American Fencing Championships =

The 2017 Pan American Fencing Championships is held at the Centre Pierre-Charbonneau in Montreal from 13 to 18 June 2017. The event was organized by the Pan American Fencing Confederation and Canadian Fencing Federation.

== Medal summary ==
=== Men's events ===
Event	Gold	Silver	Bronze
Foil	Race Imboden (USA)	Alexander Massialas (USA)	Gerek Meinhardt (USA)
Foil	Race Imboden (USA)	Alexander Massialas (USA)	Miles Chamley-Watson (USA)
Team Foil	United States; Miles Chamley-Watson; Race Imboden; Alexander Massialas; Gerek Meinhardt	Brazil; Guilherme Toldo; Henrique Marques; Julien Baneux; Heitor Shimbo	Mexico; Daniel Gómez; Jesus Beltran Macias; José Alberto Pelletier
Épée	Rubén Limardo (VEN)	Jhon Édison Rodríguez (COL)	Benjamin Bratton (USA)
Épée	Rubén Limardo (VEN)	Jhon Édison Rodríguez (COL)	Alexandre Camargo (BRA)
Team Épée	Venezuela; Francisco Limardo; Rubén Limardo; Jesus Limardo; Grabiel Lugo	Argentina; José Félix Dominguez; Jesus Andres Ruggeri; Alessandro Taccani	Canada; Maxime Brinck-Croteau; Marc-Antoine Blais-Belanger; Hugues Boisvert-Simard; Pascal Heidecker
Sabre	Daryl Homer (USA)	Eli Dershwitz (USA)	Joseph Polossifakis (CAN)
Sabre	Daryl Homer (USA)	Eli Dershwitz (USA)	Jeff Spear (USA)
Team Sabre	United States; Eli Dershwitz; Daryl Homer; Geoffrey Loss; Jeff Spear	Canada; Fares Arfa; Cedric Boutet; Shaul Gordon; Joseph Polossifakis	Venezuela; Jesus Carvajal; Antonio Leal; Jose Quintero; Abraham Rodriguez

=== Women's events ===
Event	Gold	Silver	Bronze
Foil	Lee Kiefer (USA)	Sabrina Massialas (USA)	Nicole Ross (USA)
Foil	Lee Kiefer (USA)	Sabrina Massialas (USA)	Margaret Lu (USA)
Team Foil	United States; Jacqueline Dubrovich; Lee Kiefer; Margaret Lu; Nicole Ross	Canada; Shannon Comerford; Alanna Goldie; Eleanor Harvey; Kelleigh Ryan	Brazil; Ana Beatriz Bulcão; Gabriela Cecchini; Mariana Pistoia; Ana Toldo
Épée	Kelley Hurley (USA)	Courtney Hurley (USA)	Nathalie Moellhausen (BRA)
Épée	Kelley Hurley (USA)	Courtney Hurley (USA)	Katharine Holmes (USA)
Team Épée	United States; Katharine Holmes; Kelley Hurley; Courtney Hurley; Anna van Brummen	Canada; Leonora Mackinnon; Malinka Hoppe Montanaro; Vanessa Lacas-Warrick; Brittany Mark-Larkin	Brazil; Katherine Miller; Bianca Dantas; Clarisse Menezes
Sabre	Paola Pliego (MEX)	Julieta Toledo (MEX)	Marissa Ponich (CAN)
Sabre	Paola Pliego (MEX)	Julieta Toledo (MEX)	Shia Rodriguez (VEN)
Team Sabre	Mexico; Úrsula González; Paola Pliego; Julieta Toledo; Vanessa Infante	United States; Monica Aksamit; Ibtihaj Muhammad; Anne-Elizabeth Stone; Francesca Russo	Venezuela; Alejandra Romero; Patricia Contreras; Milagros Pastran; Shia Rodriguez

== Medal table ==
Rank	Nation	Gold	Silver	Bronze	Total
1	United States (USA)	8	5	7	20
2	Mexico (MEX)	2	1	1	4
3	Venezuela (VEN)	2	0	3	5
4	Canada (CAN)	0	3	3	6
5	Brazil (BRA)	0	1	4	5
6	Argentina (ARG)	0	1	0	1
6	Colombia (COL)	0	1	0	1
Totals (7 entries)		12	12	18	42

== Results ==
=== Men ===
==== Foil individual ====
Position	Name	Country
1st place, gold medalist(s)	Race Imboden	United States
2nd place, silver medalist(s)	Alexander Massialas	United States
3rd place, bronze medalist(s)	Gerek Meinhardt	United States
3rd place, bronze medalist(s)	Miles Chamley-Watson	United States
5.	Juan Sebastian Unda	Mexico
6.	Guilherme Toldo	Brazil
7.	Augusto Antonio Servello	Argentina
8.	Henrique Marques	Brazil

Quarter-finals
(United States) Race Imboden	15
(Brazil) Guilherme Toldo	7
(Mexico) Juan Sebastian Unda	3
(United States) Gerek Meinhardt	15
(Argentina) Augusto Antonio Servello	1
(United States) Alexander Massialas	15
(Brazil) Henrique Marques	7
(United States) Miles Chamley-Watson	15

Semi-finals
(United States) Race Imboden	15
(United States) Gerek Meinhardt	11
(United States) Alexander Massialas	15
(United States) Miles Chamley-Watson	14

Final
(United States) Race Imboden	15
(United States) Alexander Massialas	12

==== Épée individual ====
Position	Name	Country
1st place, gold medalist(s)	Rubén Limardo	Venezuela
2nd place, silver medalist(s)	Jhon Édison Rodríguez	Colombia
3rd place, bronze medalist(s)	Benjamin Bratton	United States
3rd place, bronze medalist(s)	Alexandre Camargo	Brazil
5.	Jesus Andres Ruggeri	Argentina
6.	Andres Felipe Zarate	Colombia
7.	Jesus Limardo	Venezuela
8.	Hugues Boisvert-Simard	Canada

Quarter-finals
(Venezuela) Rubén Limardo	15
(Argentina) Jesus Andres Ruggeri	3
(United States) Benjamin Bratton	15
(Colombia) Andres Felipe Zarate	14
(Venezuela) Jesus Limardo	13
(Brazil) Alexandre Camargo	15
(Canada) Hugues Boisvert-Simard	12
(Colombia) Jhon Édison Rodríguez	15

Semi-finals
(Venezuela) Rubén Limardo	14
(United States) Benjamin Bratton	7
(Brazil) Alexandre Camargo	10
(Colombia) Jhon Édison Rodríguez	15

Final
(Venezuela) Rubén Limardo	11
(Colombia) Jhon Édison Rodríguez	10

==== Sabre individual ====
Position	Name	Country
1st place, gold medalist(s)	Daryl Homer	United States
2nd place, silver medalist(s)	Eli Dershwitz	United States
3rd place, bronze medalist(s)	Joseph Polossifakis	Canada
3rd place, bronze medalist(s)	Jeff Spear	United States
5.	Jose Quintero	Venezuela
5.	Jesus Carvajal	Venezuela
7.	Shaul Gordon	Canada
8.	Geoffrey Loss	United States

Quarter-finals
(United States) Eli Dershwitz	15
(Venezuela) Jose Quintero	12
(Canada) Joseph Polossifakis	15
(Venezuela) Jesus Carvajal	14
(United States) Daryl Homer	15
(Canada) Shaul Gordon	9
(United States) Jeff Spear	15
(United States) Geoffrey Loss	10

Semi-finals
(United States) Eli Dershwitz	15
(Canada) Joseph Polossifakis	10
(United States) Daryl Homer	15
(United States) Jeff Spear	12

Final
(United States) Eli Dershwitz	10
(United States) Daryl Homer	15

==== Foil team ====
Position	Name	Country
1st place, gold medalist(s)	Miles Chamley-Watson; Race Imboden; Alexander Massialas; Gerek Meinhardt	United States
2nd place, silver medalist(s)	Guilherme Toldo; Henrique Marques; Julien Baneux; Heitor Shimbo	Brazil
3rd place, bronze medalist(s)	Daniel Gómez; Jesus Beltran Macias; José Alberto Pelletier	Mexico
4.	Cesar Colon Lopez; Jonathan Lugo; Carlos Padua; Sebastian Tirado	Puerto Rico
5.	Maximilien van Haaster; Marc-Antoine Brodeur; Alex Lim	Canada
6.	Nicolas Marino; Felipe Guillermo Saucedo; Augusto Antonio Servello	Argentina
7.	Antonio Leal; Cesar Aguirre; Johan Mora	Venezuela
8.	Dimitri Clairet; Santiago Pachon; Daniel Sconzo	Colombia

Quarter-finals
United States	45
Colombia	21
Puerto Rico	45
Argentina	42
Canada	43
Mexico	44
Venezuela	32
Brazil	45

Semi-finals
United States	45
Puerto Rico	15
Mexico	33
Brazil	45

Final
United States	45
Brazil	37
Third place
Puerto Rico	32
Mexico	45

==== Épée team ====
Position	Name	Country
1st place, gold medalist(s)	Francisco Limardo; Rubén Limardo; Jesus Limardo; Grabiel Lugo	Venezuela
2nd place, silver medalist(s)	José Félix Dominguez; Jesus Andres Ruggeri; Alessandro Taccani	Argentina
3rd place, bronze medalist(s)	Maxime Brinck-Croteau; Marc-Antoine Blais-Belanger; Hugues Boisvert-Simard; Pascal Heidecker	Canada
4.	Benjamin Bratton; Jason Pryor; Adam Rodney; Cooper Schumacher	United States
5.	Athos Schwantes; Gabriel Bonamigo; Alexandre Camargo; Fabrizio Lazaroto	Brazil
6.	Jhon Édison Rodríguez; Andres Felipe Zarate; Gustavo Coqueco; Alexander González	Colombia
7.	Jean Carlos de la Cruz; Hector Maisonet; Lorenzo Sanchez	Puerto Rico
8.	Rodrigo Gonzalez; Rolf Nickel; Heinz Nickel; Pablo Nunez	Chile

Quarter-finals
Venezuela	45
Puerto Rico	21
Colombia	43
Canada	44
Brazil	31
Argentina	45
Chile	31
United States	45

Semi-finals
Venezuela	45
Canada	30
Argentina	45
United States	40

Final
Venezuela	45
Argentina	34
Third place
Canada	41
United States	36

==== Sabre team ====
Position	Name	Country
1st place, gold medalist(s)	Eli Dershwitz; Daryl Homer; Geoffrey Loss; Jeff Spear	United States
2nd place, silver medalist(s)	Fares Arfa; Cedric Boutet; Shaul Gordon; Joseph Polossifakis	Canada
3rd place, bronze medalist(s)	Jesus Carvajal; Antonio Leal; Jose Quintero; Abraham Rodriguez	Venezuela
4.	Carlos Correa Vila; Sebastian Cuellar; Pablo Trochez	Colombia
5.	Ricardo Alberto Bustamante; Pascual Maria di Tella; Martin Grunwaldt; Stefano Lucchetti	Argentina
6.	Sebastian Azolas; Manuel Bahamonde; Victor Contreras; Tarik Ruiz	Chile
7.	Adrian Acuña Ramirez; Juliana Ayala; Javier Alejandro Flores; Brandon Romo	Mexico
8.	Rodrigo Baldin; Henrique Garrigos; Fernando Scavasin; Arthur Whitaker	Brazil

Quarter-finals
United States	45
Brazil	16
Colombia	45
Chile	26
Canada	45
Mexico	39
Venezuela	45
Argentina	42

Semi-finals
United States	45
Colombia	23
Canada	45
Venezuela	34

Final
United States	45
Canada	29
Third place
Colombia	35
Venezuela	45

=== Women ===
==== Foil individual ====
Position	Name	Country
1st place, gold medalist(s)	Lee Kiefer	United States
2nd place, silver medalist(s)	Sabrina Massialas	United States
3rd place, bronze medalist(s)	Nicole Ross	United States
3rd place, bronze medalist(s)	Margaret Lu	United States
5.	Eleanor Harvey	Canada
6.	Saskia Loretta Garcia	Colombia
7.	Alely Hernandez	Mexico
8.	Alanna Goldie	Canada

Quarter-finals
(United States) Lee Kiefer	15
(Canada) Eleanor Harvey	10
(United States) Nicole Ross	15
(Colombia) Saskia Loretta Garcia	0
(United States) Sabrina Massialas	13
(Mexico) Alely Hernandez	5
(Canada) Alanna Goldie	11
(United States) Margaret Lu	15

Semi-finals
(United States) Lee Kiefer	15
(United States) Nicole Ross	13
(United States) Sabrina Massialas	12
(United States) Margaret Lu	10

Final
(United States) Lee Kiefer	15
(United States) Sabrina Massialas	11

==== Épée individual ====
Position	Name	Country
1st place, gold medalist(s)	Kelley Hurley	United States
2nd place, silver medalist(s)	Courtney Hurley	United States
3rd place, bronze medalist(s)	Nathalie Moellhausen	Brazil
3rd place, bronze medalist(s)	Katharine Holmes	United States
5.	Josefina Maria Bello	Argentina
6.	María Martínez	Venezuela
7.	Alejandra Terán	Mexico
8.	Anna van Brummen	United States

Quarter-finals
(United States) Kelley Hurley	15
(Argentina) Josefina Maria Bello	4
(Venezuela) María Martínez	10
(Brazil) Nathalie Moellhausen	14
(United States) Courtney Hurley	15
(Mexico) Alejandra Terán	8
(United States) Katharine Holmes	15
(United States) Anna van Brummen	14

Semi-finals
(United States) Kelley Hurley	15
(Brazil) Nathalie Moellhausen	11
(United States) Courtney Hurley	15
(United States) Katharine Holmes	8

Final
(United States) Kelley Hurley	15
(United States) Courtney Hurley	13

==== Sabre individual ====
Position	Name	Country
1st place, gold medalist(s)	Paola Pliego	Mexico
2nd place, silver medalist(s)	Julieta Toledo	Mexico
3rd place, bronze medalist(s)	Marissa Ponich	Canada
3rd place, bronze medalist(s)	Shia Rodriguez	Venezuela
5.	Monica Aksamit	United States
6.	Dagmara Wozniak	United States
7.	Alejandra Romero	Venezuela
8.	Ibtihaj Muhammad	United States

Quarter-finals
(Mexico) Paola Pliego	15
(United States) Monica Aksamit	13
(United States) Dagmara Wozniak	14
(Canada) Marissa Ponich	15
(Venezuela) Alejandra Romero	10
(Venezuela) Shia Rodriguez	15
(Mexico) Julieta Toledo	15
(United States) Ibtihaj Muhammad	14

Semi-finals
(Mexico) Paola Pliego	15
(Canada) Marissa Ponich	7
(Venezuela) Shia Rodriguez	4
(Mexico) Julieta Toledo	15

Final
(Mexico) Paola Pliego	15
(Mexico) Julieta Toledo	11

==== Foil team ====
Position	Name	Country
1st place, gold medalist(s)	Jacqueline Dubrovich; Lee Kiefer; Margaret Lu; Nicole Ross	United States
2nd place, silver medalist(s)	Shannon Comerford; Alanna Goldie; Eleanor Harvey; Kelleigh Ryan	Canada
3rd place, bronze medalist(s)	Ana Beatriz Bulcão; Gabriela Cecchini; Mariana Pistoia; Ana Toldo	Brazil
4.	Alely Hernandez; Victoria Oceguera; Melissa Rebolledo; Alejandra Terán	Mexico
5.	Agustina Macri; Flavia Johana Mormandi; Lucia Ondarts; Maria Ludmila Terni	Argentina
6.	Gabriela Padua; Melanie Rivera Roig; Alanis Rivera Roig; Aslyn Zayas	Puerto Rico
7.	Alejandra Flores; Arantza Inostroza; Katina Proestakis; Paula Silva	Chile

Quarter-finals
United States
-
Puerto Rico	22
Mexico	45
Brazil	45
Chile	25
Argentina	27
Canada	42

Semi-finals
United States	45
Mexico	13
Brazil	32
Canada	41

Final
United States	45
Canada	26
Third place
Mexico	38
Brazil	45

==== Épée team ====
Position	Name	Country
1st place, gold medalist(s)	Katharine Holmes; Kelley Hurley; Courtney Hurley; Anna van Brummen	United States
2nd place, silver medalist(s)	Leonora Mackinnon; Malinka Hoppe Montanaro; Vanessa Lacas-Warrick; Brittany Mark-Larkin	Canada
3rd place, bronze medalist(s)	Katherine Miller; Bianca Dantas; Clarisse Menezes	Brazil
4.	Analia Fernandez; Macarena Hultazo; Rudy Lepe; Andrea Lepe	Chile
5.	María Martinez; Lizzie Asis; Eliana Lugo; Patrizia Piovesan Silva	Venezuela
6.	Alejandra Terán; Jocelyn Cruz; Sheila Liliana Tejeda	Mexico
7.	Isabel Di Tella; Josefina Maria Bello; Maria Victoria Keen	Argentina
8.	Margarita Díaz; Elinette Diaz Rivera; Sabrina Lopez Soto	Puerto Rico

Quarter-finals
United States	45
Mexico	20
Puerto Rico	36
Chile	42
Brazil	28
Argentina	26
Venezuela	39
Canada	45

Semi-finals
United States	45
Chile	19
Brazil	36
Canada	45

Final
United States	45
Canada	26
Third place
Chile	24
Brazil	45

==== Sabre team ====
Position	Name	Country
1st place, gold medalist(s)	Úrsula González; Paola Pliego; Julieta Toledo; Vanessa Infante	Mexico
2nd place, silver medalist(s)	Monica Aksamit; Ibtihaj Muhammad; Anne-Elizabeth Stone; Francesca Russo	United States
3rd place, bronze medalist(s)	Alejandra Romero; Patricia Contreras; Milagros Pastran; Shia Rodriguez	Venezuela
4.	Pamela Brind'Amour; Marissa Ponich; Madison Thurgood	Canada
5.	Linda Ibeth Castellanos; Linda Klimavicius; Jessica Yolima Linares	Colombia
6.	Giulia Gasparin; Luiza Lee; Karina Trois	Brazil
7.	María Belén Pérez Maurice; Maria Macarena Moran; Maria Alicia Perroni	Argentina
8.	Karla Guaita Cahue; Karen Moreno; Yolanda Muñoz	Chile

Quarter-finals
United States	45
Brazil	14
Chile	24
Venezuela	45
Canada	45
Argentina	40
Colombia	33
Mexico	45

Semi-finals
United States	45
Venezuela	35
Canada	39
Mexico	45

Final
United States	40
Mexico	45
Third place
Venezuela	45
Canada	27
