= 2015 Pan American Fencing Championships =

The 2015 Pan American Fencing Championships were held at the National Sports Stadium, in Santiago de Chile, from 17 to 26 April 2015. The event was organized by the Pan American Fencing Confederation and the Chilean Fencing Federation, with the support of the International Fencing Federation and with the sponsorship of the Chilean Ministry of Sport and the Chilean Olympic Committee. It gathered more than 220 fencers from 24 countries. It is a qualifying tournament for the 2015 Pan American Games in Toronto. It also belongs to the qualification road to the 2016 Summer Olympics.

== Medal summary ==
=== Men's events ===
Event	Gold	Silver	Bronze
Foil	Race Imboden (USA)	Alexander Massialas (USA)	Gerek Meinhardt (USA); Heitor Shimbo (BRA)
Team Foil	United States; Alexander Massialas; Race Imboden; Miles Chamley-Watson; Nobuo Bravo	Brazil; Ghislain Perrier; Guilherme Toldo; Fernando Scavasin; Heitor Shimbo	Canada; Maximilien Van Haaster; Anthony Prymack; Étienne Lalonde Turbide; Eli Schenkel
Épée	Rubén Limardo (VEN)	Maxime Brinck-Croteau (CAN)	Francisco Limardo (VEN); Reynier Henriquez Ortiz (CUB)
Team Épée	United States; Jimmy Moody; Ben Bratton; Jason Pryor; Ari Simmons	Venezuela; Silvio Fernández; Rubén Limardo; Kelvin Cañas; Francisco Limardo	Argentina; José Félix Domínguez; Alessandro Taccani; Jesús Lugones; Laszlo Gaspar
Sabre	Eli Dershwitz (USA)	Daryl Homer (USA)	Renzo Agresta (BRA); Jeff Spear (USA)
Team Sabre	United States; Peter Souders; Jeff Spear; Jimmy Moody; Gabe Armijo	Canada; Shaul Gordon; Mark Peros; Joseph Polossifakis; Rémi Bédard-Couture	Venezuela; José Quintero; Jesús Carvajal; Abraham Rodríguez; Eliécer Romero

=== Women's events ===
Event	Gold	Silver	Bronze
Foil	Lee Kiefer (USA)	Nicole Ross (USA)	Isis Giménez (VEN); Saskia Loretta Garcia (COL)
Team Foil	United States; Nicole Ross; Nzingha Prescod; Margaret Lu; Lee Kiefer	Canada; Alanna Goldie; Kelleigh Ryan; Shannon Comerford; Eleanor Harvey	Venezuela; Emiliana Rivero; Yulitza Suárez; Liz Ribero; Isis Giménez
Épée	Nathalie Moellhausen (BRA)	Kelley Hurley (USA)	Leonora MacKinnon (CAN); Katherine Holmes (USA)
Team Épée	United States; Courtney Hurley; Kelley Hurley; Katherine Holmes; Isabel Ford	Venezuela; Eliana Lugo; Lizze Asis; Dayana Martinez; Maria Martinez	Cuba; Yoslaine Cardenal; Yamilka Rodríguez; Seily Mendoza
Sabre	Mariel Zagunis (USA)	Dagmara Wozniak (USA)	Anne-Elizabeth Stone (USA); Paola Pliego (MEX)
Team Sabre	United States; Mariel Zagunis; Ibtihaj Muhammad; Dagmara Wozniak; Anne-Elizabeth Stone	Mexico; Paola Pliego; Úrsula González; Tania Arrayales; Julieta Toledo	Venezuela; Alejandra Benítez; Patricia Contreras; Milagros Pastrán; Shia Rodríguez

=== Medal table ===
Rank	Nation	Gold	Silver	Bronze	Total
1	United States	10	5	4	19
2	Venezuela	1	2	5	8
3	Brazil	1	1	2	4
4	Canada	0	3	2	5
5	Mexico	0	1	1	2
6	Cuba	0	0	2	2
7	Argentina	0	0	1	1
7	Colombia	0	0	1	1
Totals (8 entries)		12	12	18	42

== Results ==
=== Men ===
==== Foil individual ====
Position	Name	Country
1st place, gold medalist(s)	Race Imboden	United States
2nd place, silver medalist(s)	Alexander Massialas	United States
3rd place, bronze medalist(s)	Heitor Shimbo	Brazil
3rd place, bronze medalist(s)	Gerek Meinhardt	United States
5.	Guilherme Toldo	Brazil
5.	Miles Chamley-Watson	United States
7.	Ghislain Perrier	Brazil
8.	Maximilien Van Haaster	Canada

Quarter-finals
(United States) Race Imboden	15
(Canada) Maximilien Van Haaster	13
(Brazil) Heitor Shimbo	15
(Brazil) Guilherme Toldo	8
(United States) Alexander Massialas	15
(United States) Miles Chamley-Watson	13
(Brazil) Ghislain Perrier	13
(United States) Gerek Meinhardt	15

Semi-finals
(United States) Race Imboden	15
(Brazil) Heitor Shimbo	5
(United States) Alexander Massialas	15
(United States) Gerek Meinhardt	12

Final
(United States) Race Imboden	15
(United States) Alexander Massialas	13

==== Épée individual ====
Position	Name	Country
1st place, gold medalist(s)	Rubén Limardo	Venezuela
2nd place, silver medalist(s)	Maxime Brinck-Croteau	Canada
3rd place, bronze medalist(s)	Reynier Henriquez Ortiz	Cuba
3rd place, bronze medalist(s)	Francisco Limardo	Venezuela
5.	Jason Pryor	United States
5.	Jean Lelion	Canada
7.	Benjamin Bratton	United States
8.	Silvio Fernández	Venezuela

Quarter-finals
(Venezuela) Silvio Fernández	10
(Venezuela) Francisco Limardo	11
(Venezuela) Rubén Limardo	10
(United States) Benjamin Bratton	9
(Canada) Maxime Brinck-Croteau	12
(United States) Jason Pryor	10
(Canada) Jean Lelion	9
(Cuba) Reynier Henriquez Ortiz	14

Semi-finals
(Venezuela) Francisco Limardo	8
(Venezuela) Rubén Limardo	10
(Canada) Maxime Brinck-Croteau	4
(Cuba) Reynier Henriquez Ortiz	3

Final
(Venezuela) Rubén Limardo	10
(Canada) Maxime Brinck-Croteau	6

==== Sabre individual ====
Position	Name	Country
1st place, gold medalist(s)	Eli Dershwitz	United States
2nd place, silver medalist(s)	Daryl Homer	United States
3rd place, bronze medalist(s)	Renzo Agresta	Brazil
3rd place, bronze medalist(s)	Jeff Spear	United States
5.	Joseph Polossifakis	Canada
5.	Jesús Carvajal	Venezuela
7.	José Quintero	Venezuela
8.	Ricardo Bustamante	Argentina

Quarter-finals
(United States) Jeff Spear	15
(Venezuela) José Quintero	10
(Canada) Joseph Polossifakis	8
(United States) Eli Dershwitz	15
(Brazil) Renzo Agresta	15
(Venezuela) Jesús Carvajal	9
(Argentina) Ricardo Bustamante	4
(United States) Daryl Homer	15

Semi-finals
(United States) Jeff Spear	6
(United States) Eli Dershwitz	12
(Brazil) Renzo Agresta	14
(United States) Daryl Homer	15

Final
(United States) Eli Dershwitz	15
(United States) Daryl Homer	13

=== Women ===
==== Foil individual ====
Position	Name	Country
1st place, gold medalist(s)	Lee Kiefer	United States
2nd place, silver medalist(s)	Nicole Ross	United States
3rd place, bronze medalist(s)	Isis Gímenez	Venezuela
3rd place, bronze medalist(s)	Saskia Loretta Garcia	Colombia
5.	Nzingha Prescod	United States
6.	Melissa Rebolledo	Mexico
7.	Eleanor Harvey	Canada
8.	Sabrina Massialas	United States

Quarter-finals
(United States) Nzingha Prescod	10
(United States) Nicole Ross	15
(Mexico) Melissa Rebolledo	5
(Colombia) Saskia Loretta Garcia	15
(Venezuela) Isis Gímenez	14
(Canada) Eleanor Harvey	11
(United States) Sabrina Massialas	10
(United States) Lee Kiefer	15

Semi-finals
(United States) Nicole Ross	15
(Colombia) Saskia Loretta Garcia	12
(Venezuela) Isis Gímenez	12
(United States) Lee Kiefer	15

Final
(United States) Nicole Ross	12
(United States) Lee Kiefer	15

==== Épée individual ====
Position	Name	Country
1st place, gold medalist(s)	Nathalie Moellhausen	Brazil
2nd place, silver medalist(s)	Kelley Hurley	United States
3rd place, bronze medalist(s)	Katharine Holmes	United States
3rd place, bronze medalist(s)	Leonora MacKinnon	Canada
5.	Yamilka Rodriguez Quesada	Cuba
6.	Lizzie Assis	Venezuela
7.	Eliana Lugo	Venezuela
8.	Amanda Simeão	Brazil

Quarter-finals
(Brazil) Nathalie Moellhausen	15
(Brazil) Amanda Simeão	8
(Canada) Leonora MacKinnon	15
(Venezuela) Eliana Lugo	10
(Venezuela) Lizzie Assis	11
(United States) Kelley Hurley	15
(United States) Katherine Holmes	15
(Cuba) Yamilka Rodriguez Quesada	11

Semi-finals
(Brazil) Nathalie Moellhausen	15
(Canada) Leonora MacKinnon	5
(United States) Kelley Hurley	15
(United States) Katharine Holmes	12

Final
(Brazil) Nathalie Moellhausen	10
(United States) Kelley Hurley	9

==== Sabre individual ====
Position	Name	Country
1st place, gold medalist(s)	Mariel Zagunis	United States
2nd place, silver medalist(s)	Dagmara Wozniak	United States
3rd place, bronze medalist(s)	Anne-Elizabeth Stone	United States
3rd place, bronze medalist(s)	Paola Pliego	Mexico
5.	Ibtihaj Muhammad	United States
6.	Tania Arrayales	Mexico
7.	Úrsula González	Mexico
8.	Alejandra Benítez	Venezuela

Quarter-finals
(United States) Ibtihaj Muhammad	5
(United States) Dagmara Wozniak	15
(Venezuela) Alejandra Benítez	12
(Mexico) Paola Pliego	15
(United States) Anne-Elizabeth Stone	15
(Mexico) Tania Arrayales	3
(Mexico) Úrsula González	6
(United States) Mariel Zagunis	15

Semi-finals
(United States) Dagmara Wozniak	15
(Mexico) Paola Pliego	10
(United States) Anne-Elizabeth Stone	10
(United States) Mariel Zagunis	15

Final
(United States) Dagmara Wozniak	8
(United States) Mariel Zagunis	15

== See also ==
- Fencing at the 2015 Pan American Games
- Fencing at the 2015 Pan American Games – Qualification
