= Alexander Massialas =

American fencer (born 1994)

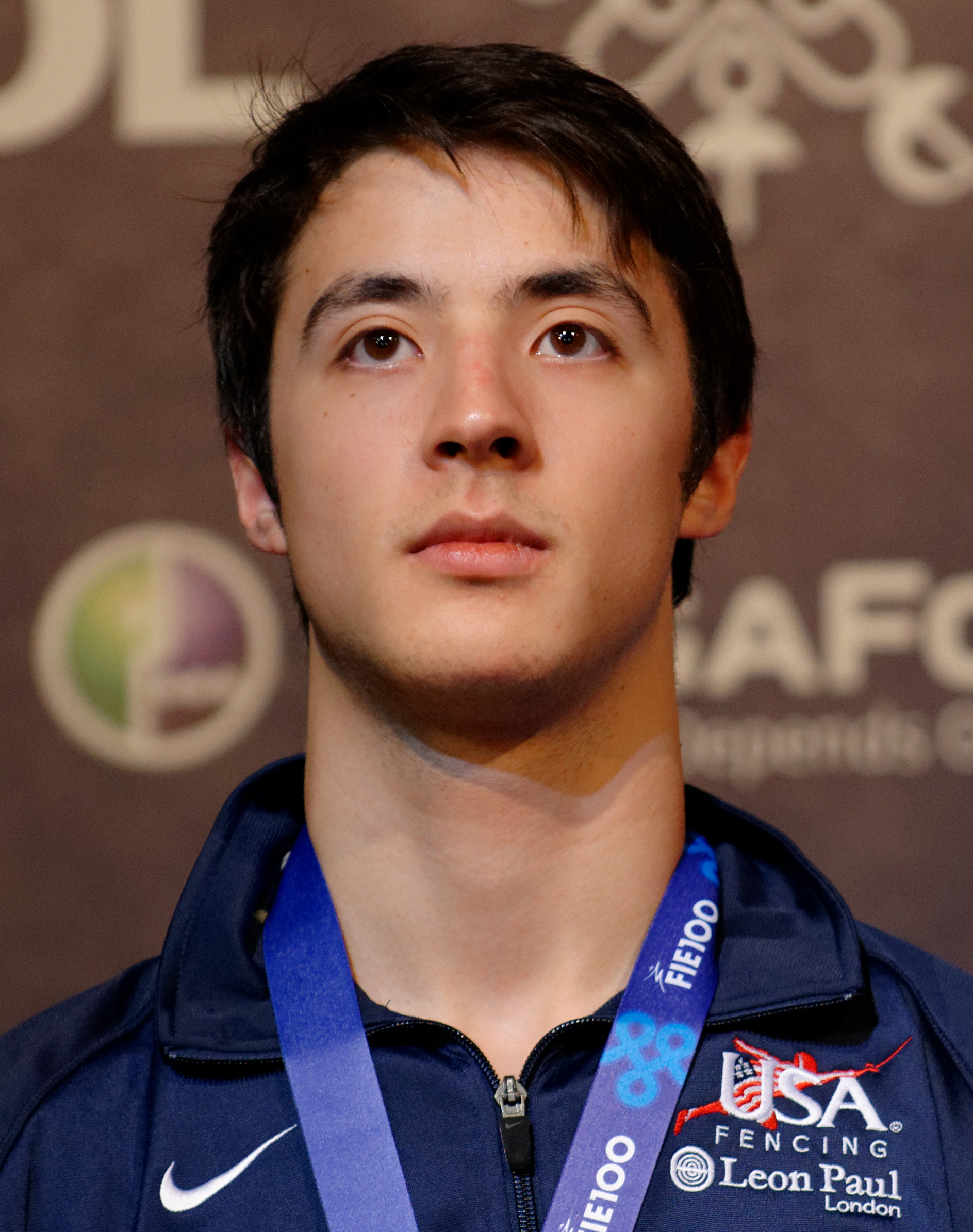
- Massialas at the 2013 World Fencing Championships

Personal information
- Born: April 20, 1994 (age 32) San Francisco, California, U.S.
- Height: 6 ft 2 in (188 cm)
- Weight: 185 lb (84 kg)
- Website: alexandermassialas.com

Fencing career
- Sport: Fencing
- Country: United States
- Weapon: Foil
- Hand: right-handed
- National coach: Greg Massialas
- FIE ranking: No. 8 (Men's foil)
Medal record
Men's foil
Representing the United States
Olympic Games
Silver medal – second place	2016 Rio de Janeiro	Individual
Bronze medal – third place	2016 Rio de Janeiro	Team
Bronze medal – third place	2020 Tokyo	Team
World Championships
Gold medal – first place	2019 Budapest	Team
Silver medal – second place	2013 Budapest	Team
Silver medal – second place	2015 Moscow	Individual
Silver medal – second place	2017 Leipzig	Team
Silver medal – second place	2018 Wuxi	Team
Silver medal – second place	2022 Cairo	Team
Silver medal – second place	2025 Tbilisi	Team
Bronze medal – third place	2026 Hong Kong	Team
Pan American Championships
Gold medal – first place	2009 San Salvador	Team
Gold medal – first place	2010 San José	Team
Gold medal – first place	2011 Reno, Nevada	Team
Gold medal – first place	2012 Cancún	Team
Gold medal – first place	2013 Cartagena	Team
Gold medal – first place	2015 Santiago	Team
Gold medal – first place	2016 Panama City	Individual
Gold medal – first place	2016 Panama City	Team
Gold medal – first place	2017 Montreal	Team
Gold medal – first place	2018 Havana	Team
Gold medal – first place	2019 Toronto	Team
Gold medal – first place	2022 Asunción	Individual
Gold medal – first place	2022 Asunción	Team
Gold medal – first place	2023 Lima	Team
Gold medal – first place	2024 Lima	Team
Gold medal – first place	2025 Rio de Janeiro	Individual
Gold medal – first place	2026 Lima	Individual
Gold medal – first place	2026 Lima	Team
Silver medal – second place	2011 Reno, Nevada	Individual
Silver medal – second place	2012 Cancún	Individual
Silver medal – second place	2014 San José	Individual
Silver medal – second place	2015 Santiago	Individual
Silver medal – second place	2017 Montreal	Individual
Bronze medal – third place	2010 San José	Individual
Bronze medal – third place	2018 Havana	Individual
Bronze medal – third place	2019 Toronto	Individual
Bronze medal – third place	2023 Lima	Individual
Bronze medal – third place	2024 Lima	Individual
Youth Olympic Games
Silver medal – second place	2010 Singapore	Individual

Alexander Massialas
- Traditional Chinese: 陳海翔
- Simplified Chinese: 陈海翔
Transcriptions
Standard Mandarin
- Hanyu Pinyin: Chén Hǎixiáng
- Bopomofo: ㄔㄣˊㄏㄞˇㄒㄧㄤˊ
Southern Min
- Hokkien POJ: Tîn Hái-siông

Alexander Chen Massialas (/ˌmɑːsiˈɑːlɪs/ MAH-see-AH-liss; Chinese: 陳海翔; pinyin: Chén Hǎixiáng; born April 20, 1994) is an American right-handed foil fencer. He is a two-time NCAA champion, 14-time team Pan American champion, four-time individual Pan American champion, and 2019 team world champion who is currently the fencing coach for the Stanford Cardinal.

A four-time Olympian, Massialas first competed in the 2012 London Olympic Games, where he was the youngest male athlete representing the United States. He later won the Olympic silver medal at the 2016 Summer Olympics Individual Men's Foil competition and is a two-time team Olympic bronze medalist, first at the 2016 Summer Olympics in Rio de Janeiro for men's team foil and then at the 2020 Tokyo Summer Olympics for men's team foil.

== Early life and education ==
Massialas was born and raised in San Francisco, California, to a Taiwanese American mother and a father of Greek descent. His mother, Chwan-Hui Chen, immigrated from Taiwan to attend graduate school in the United States, where she studied piano and pedagogy. Massialas' maternal grandfather ran a Taiwanese company, King Chong Hong (Chinese: 慶昌行), which imported Asian ingredients and utensils to the U.S. In 2021, Massialas recalled in an interview, "I have always been extremely proud of my Taiwanese heritage and I jump at any opportunity to return to Taiwan".

Massialas' father, Greg Massialas, fenced for the United States in the 1984 and 1988 Summer Olympics, and has coached the American national foil team. Massialas' sister, Sabrina, is also an Olympic fencer.

From pre-kindergarten to eighth grade, Massialas was enrolled in the Chinese American International School in San Francisco, California, where he began fencing as a child. After graduating from the Drew School, he attended Stanford University, where he earned a Bachelor of Science (B.S.) degree in mechanical engineering in 2017. In July 2023, Massialas worked at MHC Engineers, a mechanical engineering firm owned by his maternal uncle, Meng Hsiu-Chen.

== Fencing career ==
After he showed spontaneous interest at an early age, his father made him wait until he was seven years old to begin training.

An athletic child, Massialas played soccer and made the basketball and the swimming teams at Drew School. He enrolled at Stanford University on a fencing scholarship in the fall of 2012. He closed his freshman season by winning the 2013 NCAA title in individual men's foil. He repeated this feat in 2015, after falling to David Willette in 2014's semifinal round.

In July 2024, Massialas was named the head fencing coach for the Stanford Cardinal.

== Medal record ==
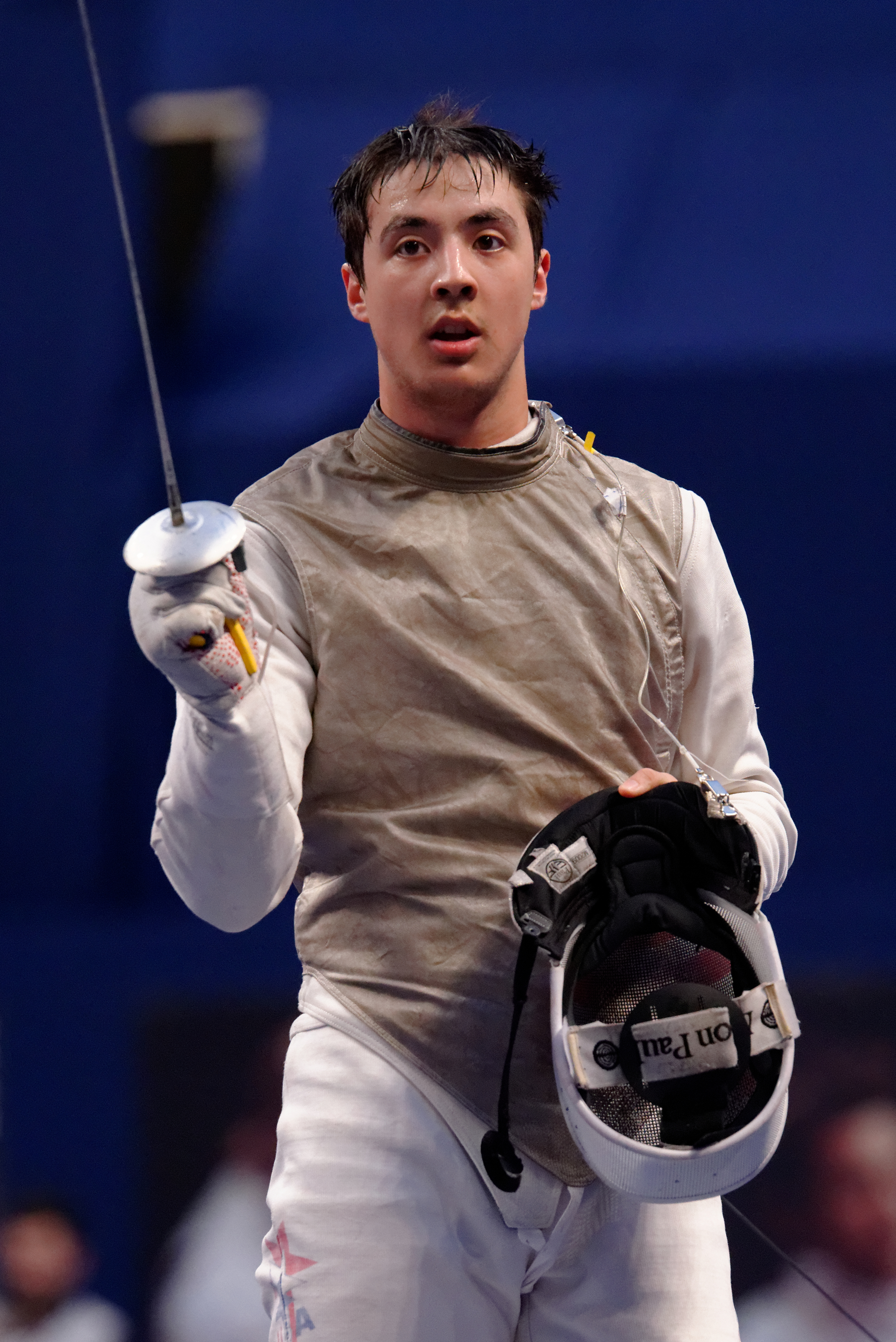
Massialas at the individual event of the 2015 Challenge International de Paris

=== Olympic Games ===
Year	Location	Event	Position
2016	Rio de Janeiro, Brazil	Individual Men's Foil	2nd
2016	Rio de Janeiro, Brazil	Team Men's Foil	3rd
2021	Tokyo, Japan	Team Men's Foil	3rd

=== World Championship ===
Year	Location	Event	Position
2013	Budapest, Hungary	Team Men's Foil	2nd
2015	Moscow, Russia	Individual Men's Foil	2nd
2017	Leipzig, Germany	Team Men's Foil	2nd
2018	Wuxi, China	Team Men's Foil	2nd
2019	Budapest, Hungary	Team Men's Foil	1st
2022	Cairo, Egypt	Team Men's Foil	2nd
2025	(Georgia (country)) Tbilisi, Georgia	Team Men's Foil	2nd
2026	Hong Kong, China	Team Men's Foil	3rd

=== Grand Prix ===
Date	Location	Event	Position
2013-03-04	St. Petersburg, Russia	Individual Men's Foil	2nd
2014-05-03	Tokyo, Japan	Individual Men's Foil	3rd
2015-03-13	Havana, Cuba	Individual Men's Foil	2nd
2016-06-03	Shanghai, China	Individual Men's Foil	1st
2016-12-02	Turin, Italy	Individual Men's Foil	2nd
2017-03-17	(United States) Long Beach, California	Individual Men's Foil	2nd
2017-12-01	Turin, Italy	Individual Men's Foil	1st
2020-02-07	Turin, Italy	Individual Men's Foil	2nd
2023-05-19	Shanghai, China	Individual Men's Foil	1st

=== World Cup ===
Date	Location	Event	Position
2010-05-29	Montreal, Canada	Individual Men's Foil	3rd
2011-05-20	Seoul, South Korea	Individual Men's Foil	3rd
2012-01-27	Paris, France	Individual Men's Foil	3rd
2013-02-22	A Coruña, Spain	Individual Men's Foil	3rd
2014-04-25	Seoul, South Korea	Individual Men's Foil	1st
2015-01-16	Paris, France	Individual Men's Foil	3rd
2015-11-06	Tokyo, Japan	Individual Men's Foil	1st
2017-01-20	Paris, France	Individual Men's Foil	1st
2018-02-09	Bonn, Germany	Individual Men's Foil	2nd
2019-03-01	Cairo, Egypt	Individual Men's Foil	3rd
2020-02-21	Cairo, Egypt	Individual Men's Foil	3rd
2023-05-07	Acapulco, Mexico	Team Men's Foil	1st
2023-11-10	Istanbul, Turkey	Individual Men's Foil	1st
2023-12-09	Tokoname, Japan	Individual Men's Foil	1st
2024-11-22	Tunis, Tunisia	Individual Men's Foil	1st
2024-11-24	Tunis, Tunisia	Team Men's Foil	2nd
2024-12-06	Takasaki, Japan	Individual Men's Foil	3rd
2024-12-08	Takasaki, Japan	Team Men's Foil	2nd
2025-01-10	Paris, France	Individual Men's Foil	2nd
2025-01-12	Paris, France	Team Men's Foil	3rd
2025-05-02	Vancouver, Canada	Individual Men's Foil	1st
2025-05-04	Vancouver, Canada	Team Men's Foil	1st
2025-12-05	Fukuoka, Japan	Individual Men's Foil	3rd
2026-01-09	Paris, France	Individual Men's Foil	1st
2026-01-11	Paris, France	Team Men's Foil	2nd
2026-04-19	Cairo, Egypt	Team Men's Foil	3rd
2026-11-13	Plovdiv, Bulgaria	Individual Men's Foil	3rd

=== Pan American Championship ===
Year	Location	Event	Position
2009	San Salvador, El Salvador	Team Men's Foil	1st
2010	San José, Costa Rica	Individual Men's Foil	3rd
2010	San José, Costa Rica	Team Men's Foil	1st
2011	(United States) Reno, Nevada	Individual Men's Foil	2nd
2011	(United States) Reno, Nevada	Team Men's Foil	1st
2012	Cancún, Mexico	Individual Men's Foil	2nd
2012	Cancún, Mexico	Team Men's Foil	1st
2013	Cartagena, Colombia	Team Men's Foil	1st
2014	San José, Costa Rica	Individual Men's Foil	2nd
2015	Santiago, Chile	Individual Men's Foil	2nd
2015	Santiago, Chile	Team Men's Foil	1st
2016	Panama City, Panama	Individual Men's Foil	1st
2016	Panama City, Panama	Team Men's Foil	1st
2017	Montreal, Canada	Individual Men's Foil	2nd
2017	Montreal, Canada	Team Men's Foil	1st
2018	Havana, Cuba	Individual Men's Foil	3rd
2018	Havana, Cuba	Team Men's Foil	1st
2019	Toronto, Canada	Individual Men's Foil	3rd
2019	Toronto, Canada	Team Men's Foil	1st
2022	Asunción, Paraguay	Individual Men's Foil	1st
2022	Asunción, Paraguay	Team Men's Foil	1st
2023	Lima, Peru	Individual Men's Foil	3rd
2023	Lima, Peru	Team Men's Foil	1st
2024	Lima, Peru	Individual Men's Foil	3rd
2024	Lima, Peru	Team Men's Foil	1st
2025	Rio de Janeiro, Brazil	Individual Men's Foil	1st
2026	Lima, Peru	Individual Men's Foil	1st
2026	Lima, Peru	Team Men's Foil	1st

== See also ==
- List of USFA Division I National Champions
- List of NCAA fencing champions
