= Fencing at the 2019 Pan American Games – Men's épée =

Men's épée at the 2019 Pan American Games
- Venue: Lima Convention Centre
- Dates: August 5
- Competitors: 18 from 10 nations

Medalists
Gold medal	Rubén Limardo	Venezuela
Silver medal	Jesús Limardo	Venezuela
Bronze medal	Jhon Édison Rodríguez	Colombia
Bronze medal	Yunior Reytor	Cuba

The men's épée competition of the fencing events at the 2019 Pan American Games was held on August 5 at the Lima Convention Centre.

The épée competition consisted of a qualification round followed by a single-elimination bracket with a bronze medal match between the two semifinal losers. Fencing was done to 15 touches or to the completion of three three-minute rounds if neither fencer reached 15 touches by then. At the end of time, the higher-scoring fencer was the winner; a tie resulted in an additional one-minute sudden-death time period. This sudden-death period was further modified by the selection of a draw-winner beforehand; if neither fencer scored a touch during the minute, the predetermined draw-winner won the bout.

== Schedule ==
Date	Time	Round
August 5, 2019	10:00	Qualification pools
August 5, 2019	12:50	Round of 16
August 5, 2019	15:00	Quarterfinals
August 5, 2019	16:00	Semifinals
August 5, 2019	18:10	Final

== Results ==
The following are the results of the event.

=== Qualification ===
All 18 fencers were put into three groups of six athletes, were each fencer would have five individual matches. The top 14 athletes overall would qualify for next round.

Rank	Name	Nation	Victories	TG	TR	Dif.	Notes
1	Jesús Limardo	Venezuela	5	23	11	+12	Q
2	Yunior Reytor	Cuba	4	23	15	+8	Q
3	Rubén Limardo	Venezuela	4	15	8	+7	Q
4	Jhon Édison Rodríguez	Colombia	4	22	17	+5	Q
5	Curtis McDowald	United States	4	21	16	+5	Q
6	Eduardo García Biel	Peru	3	19	14	+5	Q
7	Marc-Antoine Blais Bélanger	Canada	3	18	17	+1	Q
8	Jose Felix Dominguez	Argentina	3	14	13	+1	Q
9	Athos Schwantes	Brazil	3	19	19	0	Q
10	Reynier Henrique	Cuba	2	15	13	+2	Q
11	Jesús Lugones Ruggeri	Argentina	2	20	20	+1	Q
12	Jhonnatan Ortega	Mexico	2	17	18	-1	Q
13	Jacob Hoyle	United States	2	15	18	-3	Q
14	Nicolas Ferreira	Brazil	2	15	21	-6	Q
15	Dario Ibarra	Mexico	1	15	22	-7	
16	Seraphim Hsieh Jarov	Canada	1	13	22	-9	
17	Alex Landavere	Peru	0	11	20	-9	
18	Pablo Nuñez	Chile	0	13	25	-12	

=== Elimination round ===
Round of 16
9	Athos Schwantes (BRA)	15
8	Jose Felix Dominguez (ARG)	10
5	Curtis McDowald (USA)	15
12	Jhonnatan Ortega (MEX)	13
13	Jacob Hoyle (USA)	9
4	Jhon Édison Rodríguez (COL)	15
3	Rubén Limardo (VEN)	15
14	Nicolas Ferreira (BRA)	11
11	Jesús Lugones Ruggeri (ARG)	15
6	Eduardo García Biel (PER)	11
7	Marc-Antoine Blais-Belanger (CAN)	15
10	Reynier Henrique (CUB)	11

Quarterfinals
1	Jesús Limardo (VEN)	15
9	Athos Schwantes (BRA)	4
5	Curtis McDowald (USA)	13
4	Jhon Édison Rodríguez (COL)	15
3	Rubén Limardo (VEN)	15
11	Jesús Lugones Ruggeri (ARG)	8
7	Marc-Antoine Blais-Belanger (CAN)	10
2	Yunior Reytor (CUB)	15

Semifinals
1	Jesús Limardo (VEN)	11
4	Jhon Édison Rodríguez (COL)	10
3	Rubén Limardo (VEN)	10
2	Yunior Reytor (CUB)	9

Final
1	Jesús Limardo (VEN)	8
3	Rubén Limardo (VEN)	15
