= Marissa Ponich =

Canadian fencer (born 1987)

Personal information
- Born: May 1, 1987 (age 39) Edmonton, Alberta, Canada

Fencing career
- Sport: Fencing
- Country: Canada
- Weapon: Sabre
Medal record
Pan American Games
Silver medal – second place	2023 Santiago	Team sabre
Bronze medal – third place	2019 Lima	Team sabre
Pan American Fencing Championships
Silver medal – second place	2024 Lima	Team sabre
Bronze medal – third place	2013 Cartagena	Team sabre
Bronze medal – third place	2016 Panama City	Team sabre
Bronze medal – third place	2017 Montréal	Individual sabre

Marissa Ponich (born May 1, 1987) is a Canadian fencer from Lac La Biche, Alberta currently based in Edmonton, Alberta.

She competed at the Pan American Games in 2015, 2019, and 2023.

She competed at the Pan American Fencing Championships where she won a bronze medal in the individual sabre event in 2017; bronze medals in the team sabre event in 2013 and 2016; and competed in 2014, 2015 and 2018. Ponich also competed at the World Fencing Championships in 2013, 2014, 2015, 2016, 2017 and 2018.
