= Fencing at the 2015 Pan American Games – Men's team sabre =

Men's team sabre at the 2015 Pan American Games
- Venue: Toronto Pan Am Sports Centre
- Dates: July 23
- Competitors: 24 from 8 nations

Medalists
Gold medal	Eli Dershwitz; Daryl Homer; Jeff Spear	United States
Silver medal	Shaul Gordon; Mark Peros; Joseph Polossifakis	Canada
Bronze medal	Ricardo Bustamante; Pascual Di Tella; Stefano Lucchetti	Argentina

The men's team sabre competition of the fencing events at the 2015 Pan American Games was held on July 23 at the Toronto Pan Am Sports Centre.

The team sabre competition consisted of a three-round single-elimination bracket with a bronze medal match between the two semifinal losers and classification semifinals and finals for 5th to 8th places. Teams consist of three members each. Matches consist of nine bouts, with every fencer on one team facing each fencer on the other team. Scoring carried over between bouts with a total of 45 touches being the team goal. Bouts lasted until one team reached the target multiple of 5 touches. For example, if the first bout ended with a score of 5–3, that score would remain into the next bout and the second bout would last until one team reached 10 touches. Bouts also had a maximum time of three minutes each; if the final bout ended before either team reached 45 touches, the team leading at that point won. A tie at that point would result in an additional one-minute sudden-death time period. This sudden-death period was further modified by the selection of a draw-winner beforehand; if neither fencer scored a touch during the minute, the predetermined draw-winner won the bout.

== Schedule ==
All times are Eastern Daylight Time (UTC−4).

Date	Time	Round
July 23, 2015	12:35	Quarterfinals
July 23, 2015	13:45	Fifth to eighth
July 23, 2015	14:55	Semifinals
July 23, 2015	18:05	Bronze medal match
July 23, 2015	20:05	Final

== Results ==
The following are the results of the event.

Quarterfinals
1	United States	45
8	Chile	24
5	Brazil	42
4	Argentina	45
3	Mexico	34
6	Venezuela	45
7	Colombia	25
2	Canada	45

Semifinals
1	United States	45
4	Argentina	25
6	Venezuela	40
2	Canada	45

Final
1	United States	45
2	Canada	37
Third place
4	Argentina	45
6	Venezuela	42

=== Classification 5 – 8 ===
Classification
8	Chile	41
5	Brazil	45
3	Mexico	45
7	Colombia	44

Fifth place
5	Brazil	45
3	Mexico	38
Seventh place
8	Chile	45
7	Colombia	38

== Final classification ==
Rank	Team	Athlete
1st place, gold medalist(s)	United States	Eli Dershwitz; Daryl Homer; Jeff Spear
2nd place, silver medalist(s)	Canada	Shaul Gordon; Mark Peros; Joseph Polossifakis
3rd place, bronze medalist(s)	Argentina	Ricardo Bustamante; Pascual Di Tella; Stefano Lucchetti
4	Venezuela	Jesus Carvajal; José Quintero; Eliecer Romero
5	Brazil	Renzo Agresta; Enrico Pezzi; William Zeytounlian
6	Mexico	Julián Ayala; Hector Florencia Padilla; Eduardo Lara Azueta
7	Chile	Víctor Contreras; Tarik Ruiz; Israel Vázquez
8	Colombia	Carlos Enrique Correa Vila; Luis Enrique Correa Vila; Sebastian Cuellar Peña
