= Fencing at the 2015 Pan American Games – Qualification =

== Qualification system ==
A total of 156 fencers qualified to compete at the games. Each nation could enter a team of up to eighteen fencers (a team consisting of three athletes in each event). A maximum of two fencers per country could be entered in the individual events, and one team in the team events. All qualification were done at the 2015 Pan American Championships, where the top 7 teams plus two individuals in each event will qualify. Hosts Canada were automatically qualified with a full team of 18 athletes. All nations qualifying in a team event, could enter only 2 athletes in the individual event.

== Qualification timeline ==
Event	Date	Venue
2015 Pan American Championships	April 18–23	Santiago, Chile

== Qualification summary ==
NOC	Men						Women						Total
NOC	Ind. épée	Team épée	Ind. foil	Team foil	Ind. sabre	Team sabre	Ind. épée	Team épée	Ind. foil	Team foil	Ind. sabre	Team sabre	Total
Argentina	2	X	1		2	X	2	X	2	X	1		14
Brazil	2	X	2	X	2	X	2	X	2	X	2	X	18
Canada	2	X	2	X	2	X	2	X	2	X	2	X	18
Chile	1		2	X	2	X			2	X			10
Colombia	2	X	2	X	2	X	2	X	1				13
Costa Rica							1						1
Cuba	2	X	1		1		2	X	2	X	2	X	14
Dominican Republic							2	X			2	X	6
El Salvador											2	X	3
Guatemala	1												1
Mexico	2	X	2	X	2	X			2	X	2	X	15
Panama											1		1
Peru							1						1
Puerto Rico			2	X									3
United States	2	X	2	X	2	X	2	X	2	X	2	X	18
Venezuela	2	X	2	X	2	X	2	X	2	X	2	X	18
Virgin Islands					1								1
Total: 17 NOCs	18	8	18	8	18	8	18	8	17	8	18	8	155

== Men ==
=== Épée ===
Competition	Fencers per NOC	Total	Qualified
Host nation	3	3	Canada
2015 Pan American Championship team event	3	21	United States; Venezuela; Argentina; Cuba; Colombia; Brazil; Mexico
2015 Pan American Championship individual event	1	2	Chile; ~~Dominican Republic~~; Guatemala
Total		26	

=== Foil ===
Competition	Fencers per NOC	Total	Qualified
Host nation	3	3	Canada
2015 Pan American Championship team event	3	21	United States; Brazil; Mexico; Chile; Venezuela; Colombia; Puerto Rico
2015 Pan American Championship individual event	1	2	Cuba; Argentina
Total		26	

=== Sabre ===
Competition	Fencers per NOC	Total	Qualified
Host nation	3	3	Canada
2015 Pan American Championship team event	3	21	United States; Venezuela; Mexico; Argentina; Brazil; Colombia; ~~Puerto Rico~~; Chile
2015 Pan American Championship individual event	1	2	Virgin Islands; Cuba
Total		26	

== Women ==
=== Épée ===
Competition	Fencers per NOC	Total	Qualified
Host nation	3	3	Canada
2015 Pan American Championship team event	3	21	United States; Venezuela; Cuba; Dominican Republic; Argentina; Colombia; Brazil
2015 Pan American Championship individual event	1	2	Costa Rica; Peru
Total		26	

=== Foil ===
Competition	Fencers per NOC	Total	Qualified
Host nation	3	3	Canada
2015 Pan American Championship team event	3	21	United States; Venezuela; Brazil; Mexico; Chile; Argentina; ~~Puerto Rico~~; Cuba
2015 Pan American Championship individual event	1	~~2~~ 1	Colombia
Total		25	

=== Sabre ===
Competition	Fencers per NOC	Total	Qualified
Host nation	3	3	Canada
2015 Pan American Championship team event	3	21	United States; Mexico; Venezuela; Cuba; Dominican Republic; El Salvador; Brazil
2015 Pan American Championship individual event	1	2	Argentina; Panama
Total		26	
