= Rubén Limardo =

Venezuelan fencer (born 1985)

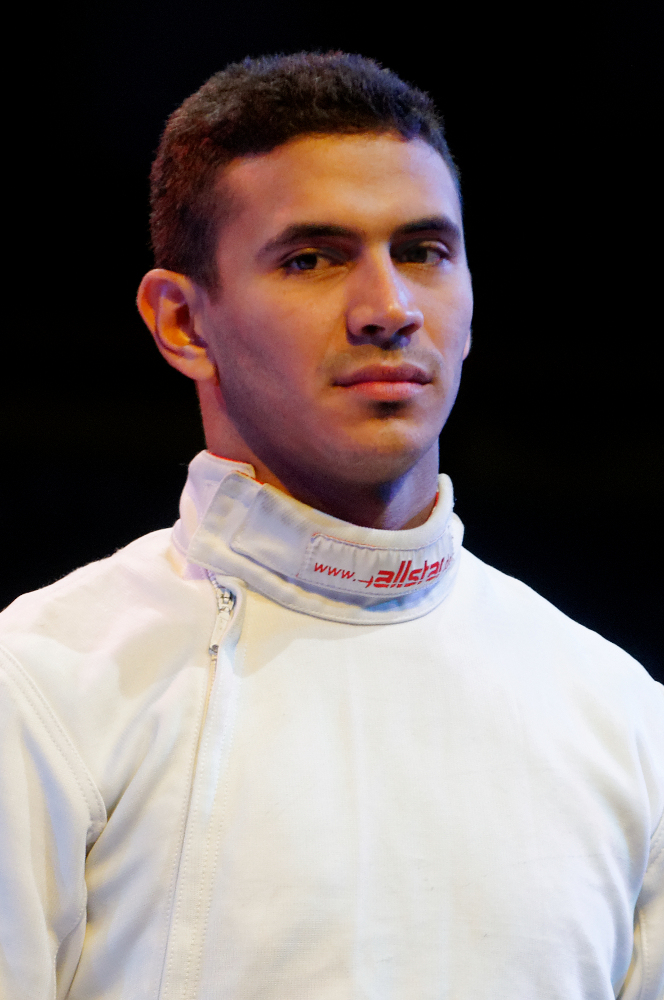
- Limardo at the Masters épée 2012

Personal information
- Full name: Rubén Dario Limardo Gascón
- Born: 3 August 1985 (age 41) Ciudad Bolívar, Bolívar, Venezuela
- Height: 175 cm (5 ft 9 in)
- Weight: 75 kg (165 lb)

Fencing career
- Sport: Fencing
- Weapon: Épée
- Club: Piast Gliwice
- FIE ranking: current ranking
Medal record
Men's épée
Representing Venezuela
Olympic Games
Gold medal – first place	2012 London	Épée
World Championships
Silver medal – second place	2013 Budapest	Individual
Silver medal – second place	2018 Wuxi	Individual
Bronze medal – third place	2023 Milan	Team
Pan American Championships
Gold medal – first place	2009 San Salvador	Individual
Gold medal – first place	2009 San Salvador	Team
Gold medal – first place	2012 Cancún	Team
Gold medal – first place	2013 Cartagena	Team
Gold medal – first place	2015 Santiago	Individual
Gold medal – first place	2016 Panama City	Team
Gold medal – first place	2017 Montreal	Individual
Gold medal – first place	2017 Montreal	Team
Gold medal – first place	2019 Toronto	Individual
Gold medal – first place	2024 Lima	Team
Gold medal – first place	2025 Rio de Janeiro	Team
Silver medal – second place	2008 Querétaro	Individual
Silver medal – second place	2008 Querétaro	Team
Silver medal – second place	2011 Reno
Silver medal – second place	2012 Cancún	Individual
Silver medal – second place	2015 Santiago	Team
Silver medal – second place	2018 Havana	Individual
Silver medal – second place	2018 Havana	Team
Silver medal – second place	2025 Rio de Janeiro	Individual
Bronze medal – third place	2011 Reno	Team
Bronze medal – third place	2013 Cartagena	Individual
Pan American Games
Gold medal – first place	2007 Rio de Janeiro	Individual
Gold medal – first place	2015 Toronto	Individual
Gold medal – first place	2015 Toronto	Team
Gold medal – first place	2019 Lima	Individual
Silver medal – second place	2007 Rio de Janeiro	Team
Silver medal – second place	2011 Guadalajara	Individual
Silver medal – second place	2011 Guadalajara	Team
Bronze medal – third place	2019 Lima	Team
Central American and Caribbean Games
Gold medal – first place	2010 Mayagüez	Team
Silver medal – second place	2006 CartagenaTeam	{{{2}}}
Silver medal – second place	2010 Mayagüez	Individual
Bronze medal – third place	2006 Cartagena	Individual

Rubén Dario Limardo Gascón (born 3 August 1985) is a Venezuelan left-handed épée fencer, five-time team Pan American champion, four-time individual Pan American champion, three-time Olympian, and 2012 individual Olympic champion.

Limardo competed in the 2012 London Olympic Games, the 2016 Rio de Janeiro Olympic Games, the 2020 Tokyo Olympic Games, and the 2024 Paris Olympic Games.

His younger brothers, Francisco and Jesus, also compete in fencing on the international level. In 2015 he was elected to the National Assembly for the United Socialist Party of Venezuela.

== Olympics ==
Born in Ciudad Bolívar, Limardo competed for his native country in the 2008 Olympics épée competition, placing 23rd.

Limardo competed at the 2012 Summer Olympics in London winning a gold medal in the individual épée event at the ExCeL Exhibition Centre on 1 August, two days before his 27th birthday. He won the gold when he defeated Norway's Bartosz Piasecki 15–10 in the men's épée final, winning Venezuela's first ever fencing medal, and Latin America's first Olympic gold medal in épée in 108 years, after Ramón Fonst won the event in 1904.

Limardo earned Venezuela's second gold medal in any Olympic Games with the first being at the 1968 Summer Olympic Games when Francisco Rodríguez won gold as a boxer in the light flyweight division.

He competed in the team and individual épée events at the 2016, 2020, and 2024 Olympic Games. In the individual event, he was eliminated in the round of 32 by Ayman Mohamed Fayez of Egypt, Romain Cannone of France, and Tibor Andrásfi of Hungary, respectively. He was the flagbearer for Venezuela during the opening ceremony in the 2016 Olympics.

== Fencing background ==
Limardo began fencing at the age of seven, encouraged by an uncle who had discovered the sport in Hungary. He was originally a right-handed foil fencer before injury caused him to switch both hand and weapon.

He was awarded the Venezuelan Order of the Liberator after winning his gold medal at the London Olympic Games. President Hugo Chávez also presented him with a gold replica of Simon Bolivar's sword encrusted with precious stones.

His brother Jesús Limardo also competes in fencing competitions. He has been a member of Piast Gliwice fencing club and currently resides in Łódź, Poland.

== Medal record ==
=== Olympic Games ===
Year	Location	Event	Position
2012	London, United Kingdom	Individual Men's Épée	1st

=== World Championship ===
Year	Location	Event	Position
2013	Budapest, Hungary	Individual Men's Épée	2nd
2018	Wuxi, China	Individual Men's Épée	2nd

=== Pan American Championship ===
Year	Location	Event	Position
2007	Montreal, Canada	Team Men's Épée	2nd
2008	Querétaro, Mexico	Individual Men's Épée	2nd
2009	San Salvador, El Salvador	Individual Men's Épée	1st
2009	San Salvador, El Salvador	Team Men's Épée	1st
2011	(United States) Reno, Nevada	Individual Men's Épée	2nd
2011	(United States) Reno, Nevada	Team Men's Épée	3rd
2012	Cancún, Mexico	Individual Men's Épée	2nd
2012	Cancún, Mexico	Team Men's Épée	1st
2013	Cartagena, Colombia	Individual Men's Épée	3rd
2013	Cartagena, Colombia	Team Men's Épée	1st
2015	Santiago, Chile	Individual Men's Épée	1st
2015	Santiago, Chile	Team Men's Épée	2nd
2016	Panama City, Panama	Team Men's Épée	1st
2017	Montreal, Canada	Individual Men's Épée	1st
2017	Montreal, Canada	Team Men's Épée	1st
2018	Havana, Cuba	Individual Men's Épée	2nd
2018	Havana, Cuba	Team Men's Épée	2nd
2019	Toronto, Canada	Individual Men's Épée	1st
2022	Asunción, Paraguay	Individual Men's Épée	1st
2022	Asunción, Paraguay	Team Men's Épée	1st

=== Grand Prix ===
Date	Location	Event	Position
2007-06-01	Montreal, Canada	Individual Men's Épée	3rd
2011-02-11	Doha, Qatar	Individual Men's Épée	3rd
2022-03-04	Budapest, Hungary	Individual Men's Épée	1st

=== World Cup ===
Date	Location	Event	Position
2006-06-23	Bogotá, Colombia	Individual Men's Épée	1st
2009-06-20	Buenos Aires, Argentina	Individual Men's Épée	1st
2010-02-27	Bern, Switzerland	Individual Men's Épée	3rd
2010-05-07	Paris, France	Individual Men's Épée	2nd
2011-03-18	Paris, France	Individual Men's Épée	3rd
2013-05-24	Buenos Aires, Argentina	Individual Men's Épée	1st
2015-02-13	Vancouver, Canada	Individual Men's Épée	3rd
2020-02-07	Vancouver, Canada	Individual Men's Épée	3rd
2021-11-19	Bern, Switzerland	Individual Men's Épée	1st

Olympic Games
Preceded by Fabiola Ramos	Flagbearer for Venezuela; Rio de Janeiro 2016	Succeeded by Yulimar Rojas & Antonio Díaz
