= Leonora MacKinnon =

Canadian fencer

Personal information
- Nationality: Canadian
- Born: 30 May 1994 (age 32) Basingstoke, England
- Education: Cheam School
- Height: 180 cm (5 ft 11 in)
- Weight: 80 kg (180 lb)

Sport
- Country: Canada
- Sport: Fencing
Medal record
Pan American Games
Silver medal – second place	2023 Santiago	Team épée
Pan American Fencing Championships
Gold medal – first place	2016 Panama City	Team épée
Gold medal – first place	2024 Lima	Team épée
Silver medal – second place	2017 Montreal	Team épée
Silver medal – second place	2018 Havana	Team épée
Silver medal – second place	2025 Rio de Janeiro	Team
Bronze medal – third place	2015 Santiago	Individual épée
- Updated on 8 May 2018

Leonora MacKinnon (born May 30, 1994) is a female épée fencer from The United Kingdom, now competing for Canada. MacKinnon won the bronze medal at the 2015 Pan American Championships in Santiago, and later competed at the 2015 Pan American Games, in Toronto, Ontario. MacKinnon originally competed for her native United Kingdom, but later made the switch to competing for Canada, as her mother was born in Toronto, which makes her a Canadian citizen as well.

MacKinnon qualified to represent her country at the 2016 Summer Olympics, by being ranked in the top two in the Americas.
