= Anna van Brummen =

American fencer

Personal information
- Nationality: American
- Born: 14 August 1994 (age 31) Singapore
- Home town: Houston, Texas, United States

Sport
- Sport: Fencing
Medal record
Representing United States
{

Anna Catherine van Brummen (born 14 August 1994) is an American fencer. She qualified to represent Team USA in the 2020 Summer Olympics, competing as part of the Women's Épée Team, which ranked 5th.

== Career highlights ==
- 2017 Pan American Championships (Team), gold
- 2017 NCAA Championships, gold
- 2016 Suzhou World Cup, gold
- 2016 July Challenge (Division I), gold
- 2016 December North American Cup (Division I), bronze
- 2015 NCAA Championships, bronze

=== Pan American Championships ===
Date	Location	Event	Rank
2017	Montreal	Team Women's Epee	1st
