= Daniel Levavasseur =

French fencing master

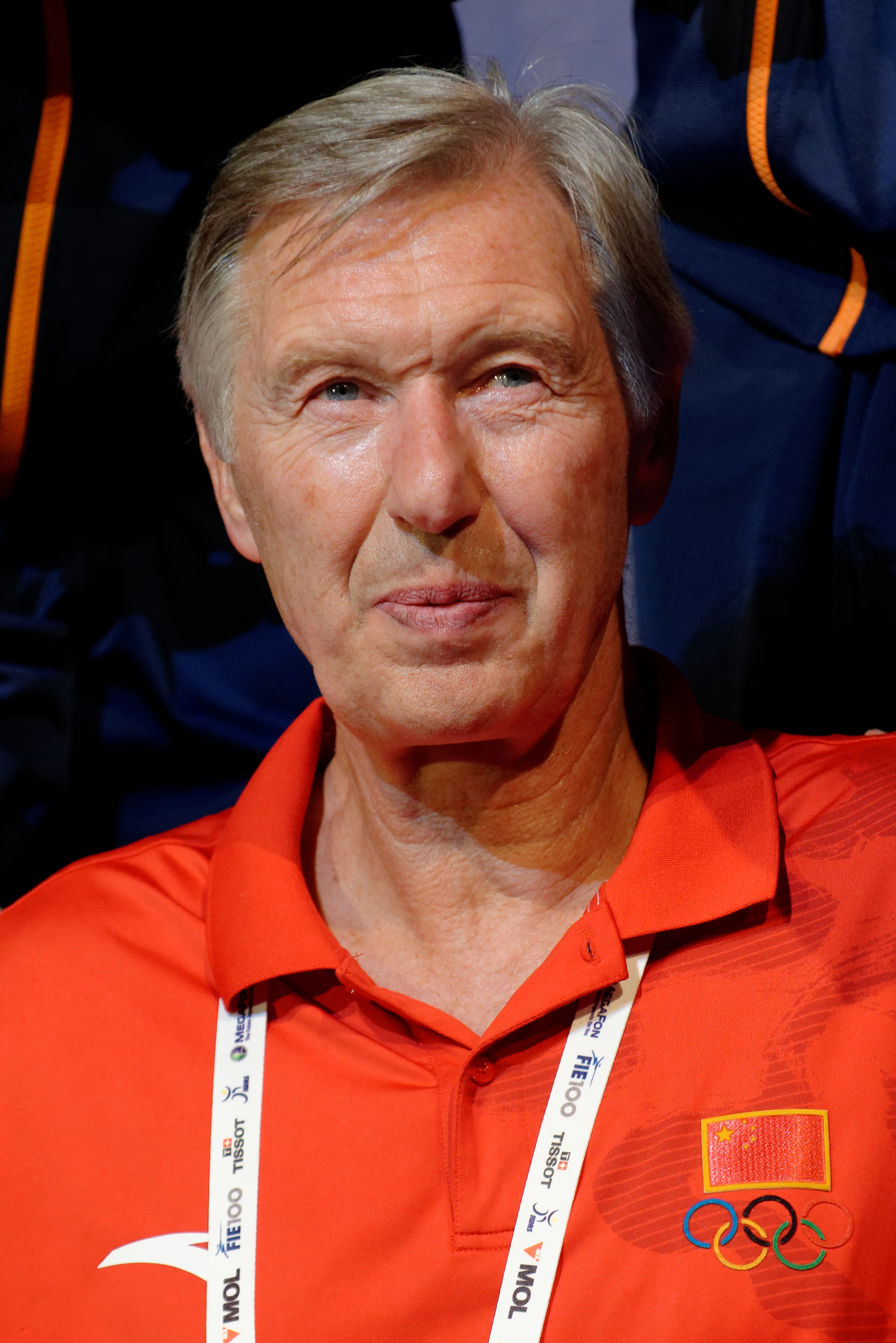

Personal information
- Full name: Daniel Louis Luc Levavasseur
- Born: 1 January 1948 (age 78) Sézanne, France
- Home town: Saint-Maur-des-Fossés, France
- Height: 1.90 m (6 ft 3 in)
- Weight: 80 kg (180 lb)

Fencing career
- Sport: Fencing
- Weapon: épée
- Hand: right-handed

Daniel Louis Luc Levavasseur (born 1 January 1948, in Sézanne, in Marne) is a French fencing master specialized in épée.

== Career ==
Levavasseur took up association football and fencing at FC Sochaux. He took the certification of fencing master at the Inter-Army School of Physical Training and Sports (in French: École interarmées d'entraînement physique et des sports) in Joinville-le-Pont, then came back to Belfort to assist his first master. He managed his own club in Besançon for a few years before being named head coach to the junior French team from 1981 to 1982, then assistant coach to the senior women's épée and foil teams from 1982 to 1984. After the Los Angeles Games he took over the senior men's épée team, leading them to an Olympic title in the Seoul Games.

After the 1992 Summer Olympics Levavasseur became head coach at the Racing Club de France, where he coached amongst others Laura Flessel-Colovic, Sherraine Schalm, Nathalie Moellhausen and Sophie Lamon. He also runs Team Levavasseur, created in 2008, and “Escrime Sans Frontières” (Fencing Without Borders), an association dedicated in training fencers from all countries in the world, especially new fencing countries. His training programme included the USA's Maya Lawrence.

Since May 2011 he was hired as a consultant to coach the Chinese national épée team, helping Li Na to the 2011 World title and China to the 2012 Olympic title, his ninth Olympic gold medal. He is also Sun Yujie's personal coach.

Levavasseur is a proponent of the French grip, to which he switched Flessel.
