= Nathalie Moellhausen =

Italo-Brazilian fencer

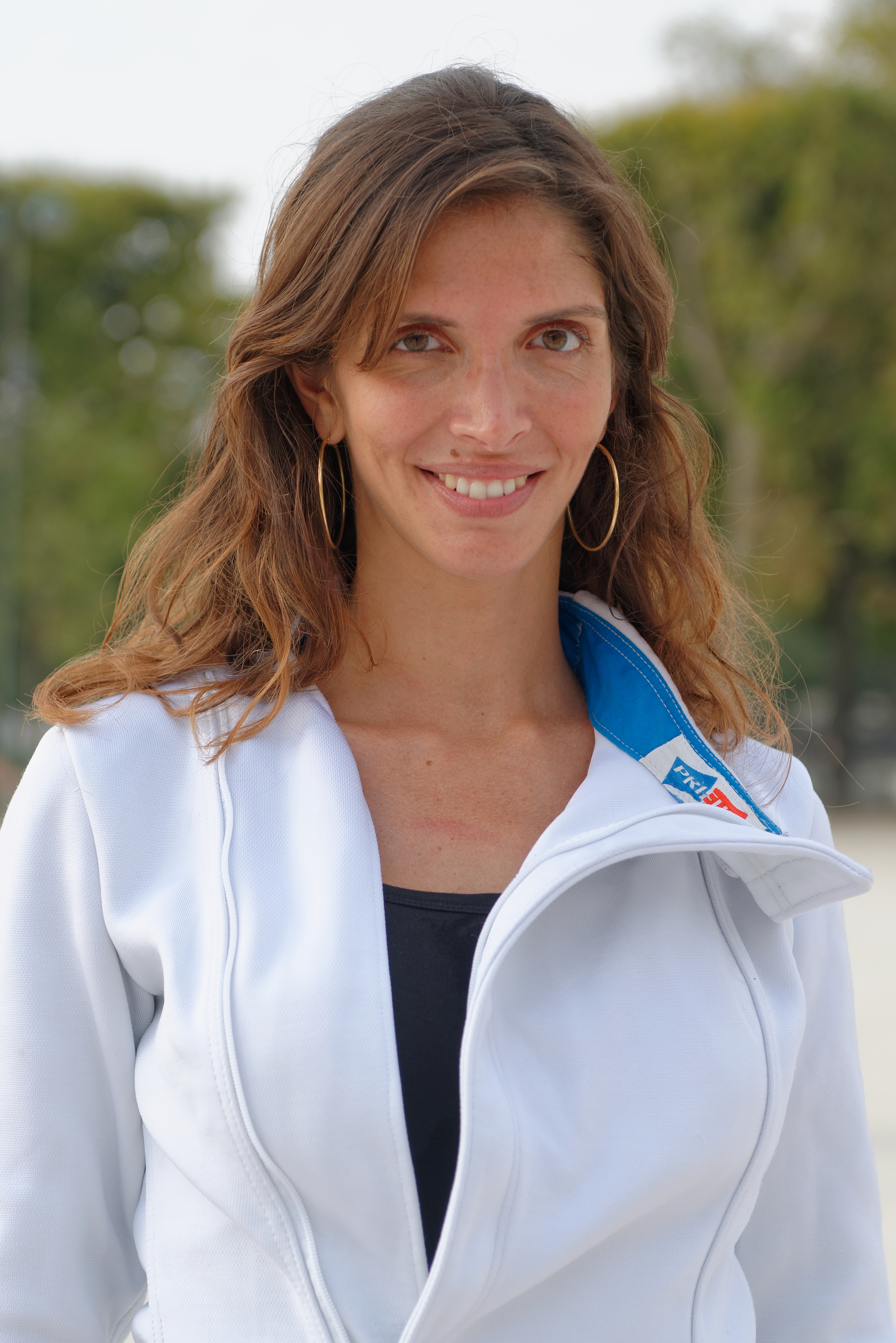
- Moellhausen in 2014

Personal information
- Born: 1 December 1985 (age 40) Milan, Italy
- Height: 1.78 m (5 ft 10 in)
- Weight: 64 kg (141 lb)

Fencing career
- Sport: Fencing
- Country: Italy (2013); Brazil (2014–present)
- Weapon: Épée
- Hand: left-handed
- Personal coach: Daniel Levavasseur, Laura Flessel-Colovic
- FIE ranking: current ranking
Medal record
Women's épée
Representing Brazil
World Championships
Gold medal – first place	2019 Budapest	Individual
Pan American Games
Gold medal – first place	2023 Santiago	Team
Bronze medal – third place	2015 Toronto	Individual
Bronze medal – third place	2015 Toronto	Team
Bronze medal – third place	2019 Lima	Individual
Pan American Championships
Gold medal – first place	2015 Santiago	Individual
Silver medal – second place	2019 Toronto	Team
Bronze medal – third place	2014 San José	Team
Bronze medal – third place	2016 Panama	Team
Bronze medal – third place	2017 Montreal	Individual
Bronze medal – third place	2019 Toronto	Individual
Representing Italy
World Championships
Gold medal – first place	2009 Antalya	Team
Bronze medal – third place	2010 Paris	Individual
Bronze medal – third place	2011 Catania	Team
European Championships
Gold medal – first place	2007 Ghent	Team
Silver medal – second place	2009 Leipzig	Team
Bronze medal – third place	2011 Sheffield	Individual

Nathalie Moellhausen (born 1 December 1985) is an épée fencer who initially represented Italy and now represents Brazil. In 2019, she became her country's first-ever individual World Champion in épée at the Championships held in Budapest, Hungary. With the Italy team, she won the team World championship in 2009 and team European championship in 2007. Representing Brazil, she won the women's individual épée World Champion title in 2019 in Budapest, Hungary.

== Early life ==
Moellhausen was born in Milan to an Italian-German father and a Brazilian mother, stylist Valeria Ferlini. Nathalie holds dual citizenship.

At age five, she began fencing at her school, then at CS Mangiarotti, where she trained under Nicola Pomarnasky, then Sandro Resegotti. She won in 2004 a bronze medal at the Junior World Championships in Plovdiv.

== Career ==
At the age of 18, she joined C.S. Aeronautica Militare, the sport section of the Italian Air Force, and moved to Paris to be coached by Daniel Levavasseur, who was training Laura Flessel at the time. The 2008–09 season saw her climb her first World Cup podium with a bronze medal in the Doha Grand Prix. Bronzes followed it in Tauberbischofsheim and Budapest, silver in the Montreal World Cup, and gold in the Lobnya World Cup. In the 2009 World Championships in Antalya, she was stopped in the round of 32, but in the team event, she conquered Italy's first gold in women's épée along with Bianca Del Carretto, Francesca Quondamcarlo and Cristiana Cascioli. Moellhausen finished the season No.8 in world rankings, her personal best as of 2014.

In the 2009–10 season, Moellhausen won a silver medal in the Rome Grand Prix. In the World Championships at Paris, she made her way to the semi-finals, where she was defeated by Emese Szász of Hungary and came away with the bronze medal. In the team event Italy were overcome by Estonia in the table of 16 and could not defend their title.

A string of injuries plagued Moellhausen's pre-Olympic season. She, however, won the bronze medal in the 2011 European Championships in Sheffield after being defeated in the semi-final by Switzerland's Tiffany Géroudet. In the World Championships in Catania, she fell in the table of 32 to South Korea's Jung Hyo-jung. In the team event, Italy reached the semi-finals, where China defeated them. They met Germany in the small final and prevailed 45–33 to win the bronze medal.

Moellhausen was selected for the 2012 Summer Olympics only as a reserve for the team. Italy was defeated in the quarterfinals by the United States and earned no medal. After the Games, Moellhausen took a break in her sport career and assumed the artistic direction of the 2013 centenary gala of the International Fencing Federation at the Grand Palais in Paris.

She announced in early 2014 her decision to come back to competition, this time under the Brazilian flag. She explained that fencing for Brazil, which has no other female épée fencer in the Top 100, allows her to aim for a qualification to the 2016 Summer Olympics in Rio de Janeiro while pursuing a professional career. She went back to training under Levavasseur and Laura Flessel. She was eliminated in the first round in her two first competitions since the 2012 Olympics, the Barcelona Grand Prix and the Rio World Cup, but she reached the quarterfinals in the Pan American Championships. In the 2014 World Championships in Kazan, she was knocked out in the first round by Italy's Rossella Fiamingo, who would eventually win the gold medal.

In the 2016 Olympics, Moellhausen reached the quarterfinals of the épée tournament, the best Olympic result Brazil ever had at this sport.

At the 2019 World Championships, Moellhausen was the only non-top-16 female épée fencer to reach the final four. She won her first two matches comfortably, beating Poland's Renata Knapik-Miazga 15–12 in the first round and China's Mingye Zhu 15–10 in the second. She won her round of 16 against Italy's Alberta Santuccio. Moellhausen led throughout the match and eventually won, 15–14. After a dramatic 11-10 extra-time win over Lis Röttler-Fautsch from Luxembourg in the quarterfinals, she overcame No. 3 seed Vivian Kong from Hong Kong, China in the semis, 15–9. She finally won the final in extra time 13–12 against World No. 11, Sheng Lin from China to claim her first individual World Champion title and the first-ever medal at a World Fencing Championship for Brazil.

Nathalie promotes fencing for students in Brazil, performing social work activities in schools and in fencing clubs.

During the 2020 coronavirus pandemic, Moellhausen has conducted virtual fencing training sessions on Instagram that have been promoted by FIE.

The day of her debut at the 2024 olympics, on July 27, 2024, Moellhausen felt sick. She received immediate medical care during the competition, but was later defeated by her rival, Canadian Ruien Xiao. It was later revealed Moellhausen had been diagnosed with a benign tumor around her lumbar region, which also was the reason for an emergency hospitalization a few days before the Olympics began that year.

=== Artistic and Lifestyle ===
Nathalie took a break from fencing in 2013 when she took over as artistic director for FIE for events held in Europe.

In addition to artistic endeavours, Nathalie has ventured into modeling and social media branding. She walked the catwalk for Italian dressmaker Alberta Ferretti after winning team gold at the World Championships in 2009. Nathalie says of her work in fashion, "My idea is to develop fencing as not just a sport, but as an artistic form, like fashion." She runs a fencing-related brand called 5 Touches, which offers lifestyle services in fashion, gastronomy, fitness, home goods, and more.
