= Eli Dershwitz =

American Olympic sabre fencer

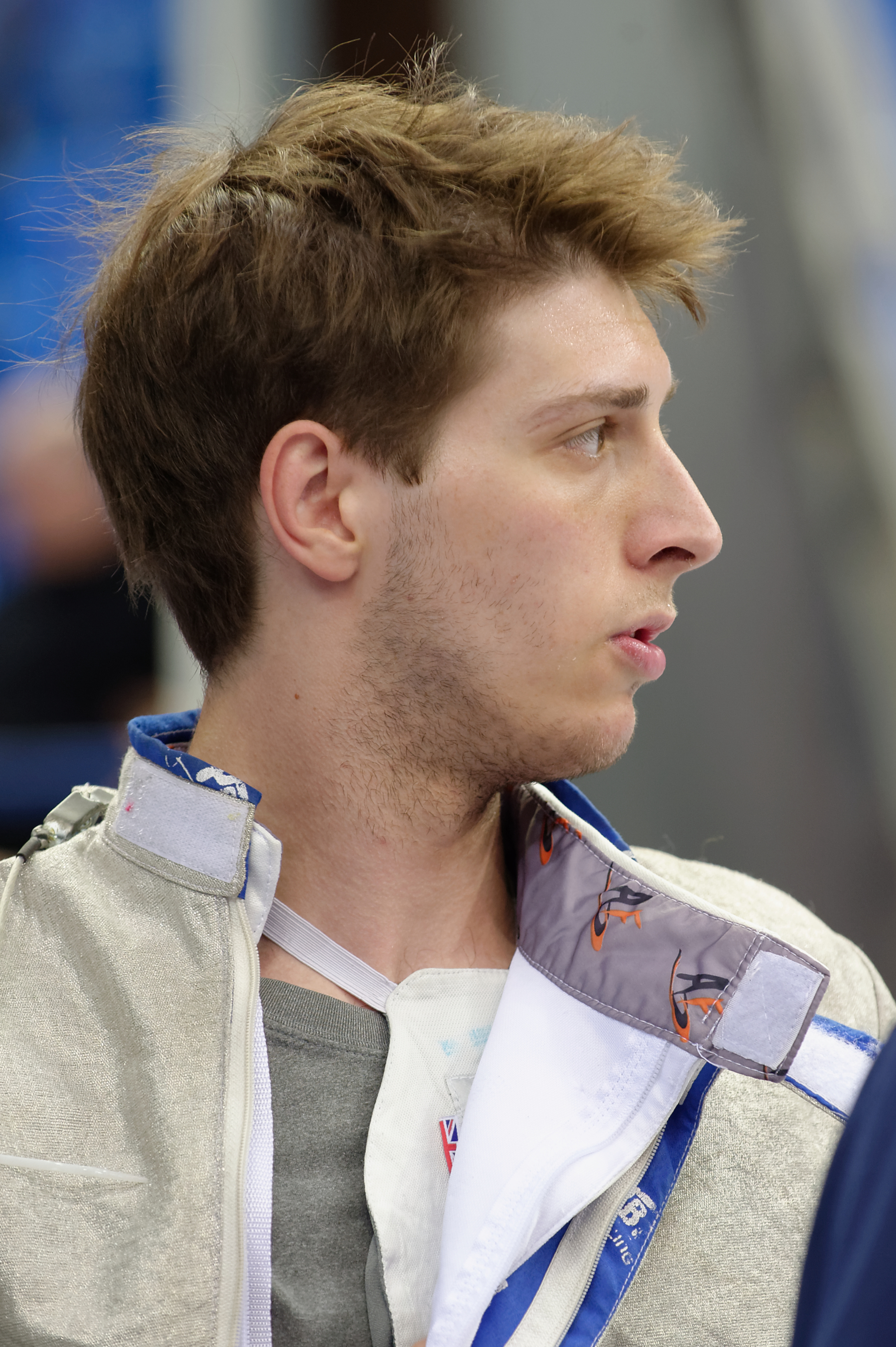

Personal information
- Born: September 23, 1995 (age 31) Sherborn, Massachusetts, U.S.
- Height: 1.85 m (6 ft 1 in)
- Weight: 79 kg (174 lb)

Fencing career
- Sport: Fencing
- Country: United States
- Training location: Natick, Massachusetts
- Weapon: Sabre
- Hand: left-handed
- Club: Zeta Fencing
- Head coach: Tim Morehouse
- FIE ranking: 17
- Domestic ranking: 1
- FIE profile
Medal record
Men's sabre
Representing the United States
World Championships
Gold medal – first place	2023 Milan	Individual
Silver medal – second place	2018 Wuxi	Individual
Bronze medal – third place	2023 Milan	Team
Pan American Games
Gold medal – first place	2015 Toronto	Individual
Gold medal – first place	2015 Toronto	Team
Gold medal – first place	2019 Lima	Team
Pan American Championships
Gold medal – first place	2013 Cartagena	Team
Gold medal – first place	2014 San José	Individual
Gold medal – first place	2015 Santiago	Individual
Gold medal – first place	2016 Panama City	Team
Gold medal – first place	2017 Montreal	Team
Gold medal – first place	2018 Havana	Individual
Gold medal – first place	2018 Havana	Team
Gold medal – first place	2019 Toronto	Individual
Gold medal – first place	2019 Toronto	Team
Gold medal – first place	2022 Asunción	Team
Gold medal – first place	2023 Lima	Team
Gold medal – first place	2024 Lima	Individual
Gold medal – first place	2024 Lima	Team
Silver medal – second place	2017 Montreal	Individual
Silver medal – second place	2022 Asunción	Individual
Bronze medal – third place	2016 Panama City	Individual
Junior World Championships
Gold medal – first place	2015 Tashkent	Individual
Silver medal – second place	2012 Moscow	Individual
Bronze medal – third place	2013 Porec	Individual
Bronze medal – third place	2014 Plovdiv	Team
Bronze medal – third place	2015 Tashkent	Team
Maccabiah Games
Gold medal – first place	2017 Tel Aviv	Individual
Gold medal – first place	2017 Tel Aviv	Team

Eli Dershwitz (/ˈdɜːrʃwɪts/ DURSH-wits; born September 23, 1995) is an American left-handed saber fencer, five-time individual Pan American champion, three-time Olympian, and the 2023 saber World Champion.

In 2014, Dershwitz won the US Men's Saber National Championship, becoming the youngest US senior men's saber championship holder. Dershwitz then won the 2015 Junior World Fencing Championships in saber, becoming the inaugural U.S. men's saber fencer to win a world title. He is a five-time Pan-American Championship title holder, and the 2015 Pan American Games champion in saber. Dershwitz competed in fencing at the 2016 Summer Olympics. He returned to Harvard University as a sophomore, winning individual saber in the 2017 NCAA Fencing Championship and as a junior in the 2018 NCAA Fencing Championship. He was ranked #1 in the United States as of February 2018, and was ranked #1 in the world as of July 2018. He was the youngest saber fencer among the world's top 25.

He won a silver medal in saber at the 2018 World Fencing Championships. He won the gold medal in saber at the 2023 World Fencing Championships.

Dershwitz represented the United States at the 2024 Summer Olympics in Paris, France, in the Men's sabre and Men's team sabre on July 27 and 31, 2024.

== Early life and education ==
Dershwitz was born and raised in Sherborn, Massachusetts, and is Jewish. His parents are Renee Goetzler and Mark Dershwitz. His maternal grandparents, both Holocaust survivors, were Ruth (née Schmukler) Goetzler (born in Tarnów, Poland, she survived the Holocaust hidden in a barn by a Polish farmer) and Mark Goetzler (born in Jasło, Poland, he also lived in Samarkand, Uzbekistan). His paternal grandparents were Arthur Dershwitz and Tillie (née Segel) Dershwitz. He has an older brother (Phil, who fenced for Princeton University) and a twin sister (Sally, who competed in gymnastics and lacrosse). He attended the Conservative synagogue Temple Israel of Natick, Massachusetts, and was bar mitzvah in 2008.

Dershwitz played basketball and soccer up until the end of middle school. He attended Dover-Sherborn High School, graduating in 2014.

He was a student at Harvard University, where he majored in history and graduated in 2019. There, Dershwitz was a member of the varsity Harvard Crimson fencing team. As a freshman in 2014–15, he was a First Team All-American, All-Ivy League, and finished third at the NCAA Fencing Championships with a 22–2 record. He was the seventh Harvard fencer to compete in the Olympics, with the prior two having been Emily Cross '09 (Team USA) and Noam Mills '12 (Team Israel), who both competed in the 2008 Beijing Olympics. Dershwitz took off the 2015–16 school year to train full-time for the Olympics. As a sophomore in 2016–17, he was again a First Team All-American, All-Ivy League, and this time he won the NCAA Fencing Championship in men's saber, becoming the first fencer to win an NCAA fencing championship for Harvard since 2007. As a junior in 2017–18, he again won the NCAA Saber Fencing Championship. He became the first Harvard male fencer to win back-to-back NCAA championships, and was again voted an All American.

== Fencing career ==
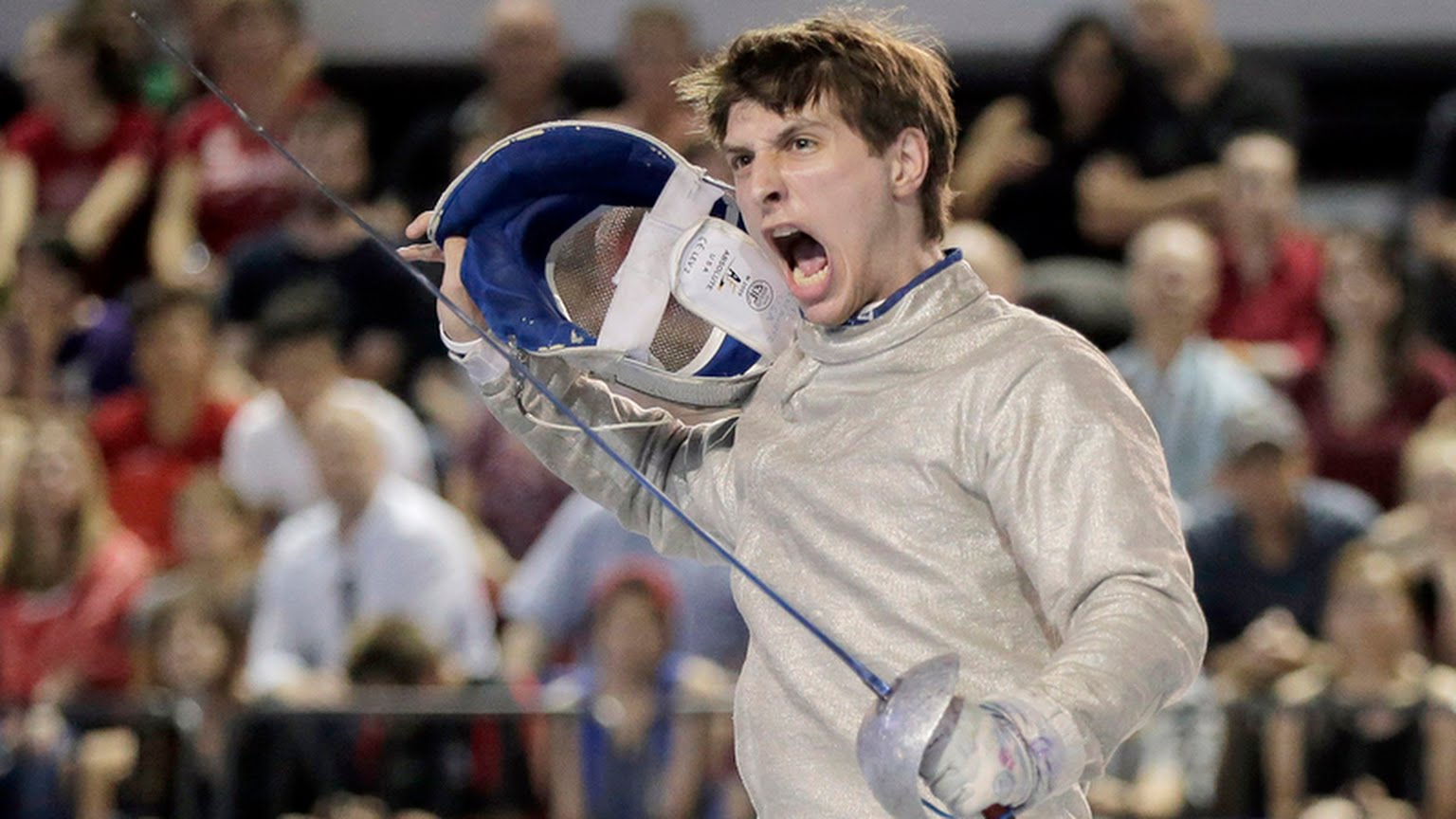
Dershwitz in 2016

Dershwitz was ranked number 1 in saber in the United States, and number 10 in the world, as of the summer of 2016. In March 2016, US Olympic saber coach Zoran Tulum said: "Eli’s world ranking is remarkable... he is the youngest [saber] fencer among the world’s top 25." He was ranked #1 in the world as of July 2018.

He followed his older brother into fencing. Dershwitz has been coached since 2004 when he was 9 years old by Tulum, at the Zeta Fencing club in Natick, Massachusetts (the club later moved to Ashland, Massachusetts). Tulum coached the US men's saber team at the 2016 Summer Olympics.

In February 2016, Dershwitz beat Russia's 2015 world champion Alexey Yakimenko at the Warsaw World Cup. In March 2016, while winning the gold medal at the Seoul Grand Prix in South Korea, he defeated 2014 world silver medalist Gu Bon-gil of Korea in the quarterfinals, 2014 world champion Nikolay Kovalev of Russia in the semifinals, and Iranian Mojtaba Abedini in the final.

In February 2017, Dershwitz won the individual saber Ivy League Championship. In March 2017, he won the individual saber in the 2017 NCAA Fencing Championships, and was again named a first-team All-American. In May 2017, Dershwitz won a silver medal at the Villa de Madrid, his first individual world cup medal. By that time he had already won two gold and three silver team world cup medals from 2014 to 2016, three junior world championships medals, a Pan American Games gold medal in 2015, and a grand prix gold medal in 2016. In June 2017 he won an individual saber silver medal at the 2017 Pan American Fencing Championships. In July 2017 he won the gold medal in saber at the 2017 Maccabiah Games. In November 2017 he won a saber World Cup in Algeria (while he was the youngest of the top 25 saber fencers in the world). '

In February 2018 (while ranked 6th in the world) he beat two-time Olympic champion Áron Szilágyi of Hungary to win the saber fencing World Cup event in Padua, Italy, and in April 2018 Dershwitz won a bronze medal at a men's saber grand prix in Seoul, South Korea. In February 2019 he won the gold medal at the Men's Saber World Cup in Warsaw, Poland. After his win, he posted on his Instagram account: "Amazing and emotional day as my mother told me this morning that my Polish grandparents, who came to America 75 years ago, would be watching over me today."

=== US Championships ===
In March 2013, Dershwitz was the top-ranked US junior saber fencer. In April 2014, Dershwitz won the US Men's Saber National Championship, becoming the youngest-ever US senior men's saber champion. As of July 1, 2016, he was ranked #1 in the United States, ahead of teammate Daryl Homer.

=== World Championships ===
Dershwitz was the 2023 World Saber Champion, and the 2015 Under-20 World Saber Champion. He was the only American men's saber fencer to win a world title.

Dershwitz is a five-time Junior World Fencing Championships and Cadet World Championships team member. He won a silver medal at the 2012 Junior World Championships, a bronze medal at the 2013 Junior World Championships, and the gold medal at the 2015 Junior World Fencing Championships (in Tashkent, Uzbekistan, where relatives of his are buried)—the first title for a US men's saber fencer at the junior world championships. In March 2013, Dershwitz was the number-two-ranked world junior saber fencer.

In 2013, Dershwitz fenced in men's sabre at the 2013 World Fencing Championships, where he finished 36th after a 15–12 loss to Matyas Szabo (Germany). He was also the youngest member of the US national team in 2013, at 17 years of age, and a rising high school senior. Dershwitz also competed in men's sabre at the 2014 World Fencing Championships in Kazan, Russia, in men's sabre at the 2015 World Fencing Championships in Moscow, Russia, and in the 2016 Senior Team World Championships in Rio de Janeiro. He won a silver medal in saber at the 2018 World Fencing Championships in China.

In 2023, Dershwitz won the men's World Saber Championship at 27 years of age, becoming the first American male world saber champion. In the competition he defeated reigning Hungary's world champion and three-time Olympic champion Áron Szilágyi (trailing Szilagyi 10–4, he rallied and won 15–13), Korea's Gu Bon-gil (two-time Olympic gold medalist), Italy's World No. 3 and three-time Olympic medalist Luigi Samele, Korean 2019 Team World Champion Ha Han-sol, and Georgia's World No. 1 and reigning European champion Sandro Bazadze. He became the first American man to win an individual world championship title in saber. He joined a number of other Jewish fencers who had won the saber world championship: Hungarian János Garay, won the third world saber championship in 1925, he died at the Mauthausen concentration camp in 1945), Hungarian Sándor Gombos (1926 and 1927), Hungarian Endre Kabos (1934 and 1935; who also died during the Holocaust), Russian Yakov Rylsky (1958, 1961 and 1963), and Russian Mark Rakita (1967).

In 2023, Dershwitz was named the men's recipient of the Jewish Sports Heritage Association 2023 Dolph Schayes Outstanding Achievement by a Jewish Athlete Award.

=== Pan American Games and Pan American Championships ===
Dershwitz is a four-time Pan-American Champion. He won individual gold medals at the 2014 Pan American Fencing Championships in San Jose, Costa Rica, and the 2015 Pan American Fencing Championships in Santiago, Chile. He also won team gold medals in the 2013 Pan American Fencing Championships in Cartagena, Colombia, and the 2016 Pan American Fencing Championships in Panama City, Panama.

Dershwitz also won gold medals in both individual and team saber in fencing at the 2015 Pan American Games in Toronto, Canada.

=== Olympics ===
Dershwitz competed at the 2016 Rio Summer Olympics, on August 10. He qualified by being in the top 14 of the FIE adjusted official ranking list, and was the youngest member of the US Olympic fencing team. He said, "I am excited to represent my country... at a sporting event that brings the entire world together in peace." Dershwitz commented on his rise from a viewer of the Games as a teenager, "just to think that in three short years ... it can go from watching on a computer screen ... screaming in my pajamas at 3 in the morning to actually being on the biggest stage in sports, it’s so hard to picture. But now it’s all I think about." Dershwitz lost to Seppe van Holsbeke of Belgium in the opening competition round of the Olympics men's sabre, 15–12, who advanced to the Round of 16. He returned to Harvard University as a sophomore six days following the 2016 Summer Olympics closing ceremony.

He fenced for the United States in fencing at the 2020 Olympics in Tokyo in 2021, losing in the round of 16 to Kim Jung-Hwan of Korea, who went on to win the bronze medal.

Dershwitz represented the United States at the 2024 Summer Olympics in Paris, France, in the Men's sabre and Men's team sabre, finishing 17th and 7th respectively.

=== 2017 Maccabiah Games ===
In 2017, Dershwitz represented the United States, fencing sabre at the 2017 Maccabiah Games held in Israel. He was awarded the honor of being a banner bearer during the Opening Ceremony, and came back with two gold medals. He won the individual men's saber event, beating Harvard teammate Philippe Guy in the finals. In the team event, Dershwitz competed alongside Philippe Guy, Ben Stone, and Matt Rothenberg. They beat Hungary in the semi-finals, and defeated their hosts, Israel, in the finals.

== Medal record ==
=== World Championship ===
Date	Location	Event	Position
2018-07-22	Wuxi, China	Individual Men's Sabre	2nd
2023-07-25	Milan, Italy	Individual Men's Sabre	1st
2023-07-27	Milan, Italy	Team Men's Sabre	3rd

=== Grand Prix ===
Date	Location	Event	Position
2016-03-25	Seoul, South Korea	Individual Men's Sabre	1st
2018-03-30	Seoul, South Korea	Individual Men's Sabre	3rd
2019-05-24	Moscow, Russia	Individual Men's Sabre	2nd
2023-01-13	Tunis, Tunisia	Individual Men's Sabre	3rd

=== World Cup ===
Date	Location	Event	Position
2017-05-19	Madrid, Spain	Individual Men's Sabre	2nd
2017-11-03	Alger, Algeria	Individual Men's Sabre	1st
2018-02-02	Padoue, Italy	Individual Men's Sabre	1st
2019-02-01	Varsovie, Poland	Individual Men's Sabre	1st
2020-02-21	Varsovie, Poland	Individual Men's Sabre	2nd
2024-03-24	Budapest, Hungary	Team Men's Sabre	1st
2024-05-19	Madrid, Spain	Team Men's Sabre	1st

=== Pan American Championship ===
Date	Location	Event	Position
2013-06-21	Cartagena, Colombia	Team Men's Sabre	1st
2014-06-03	San José, Costa Rica	Individual Men's Sabre	1st
2015-04-17	Santiago, Chile	Individual Men's Sabre	1st
2016-06-23	Panama, Panama	Individual Men's Sabre	3rd
2016-06-26	Panama, Panama	Team Men's Sabre	1st
2017-06-15	Montreal, Canada	Individual Men's Sabre	2nd
2017-06-18	Montreal, Canada	Team Men's Sabre	1st
2018-06-17	Havana, Cuba	Individual Men's Sabre	1st
2018-06-20	Havana, Cuba	Team Men's Sabre	1st
2019-06-27	Toronto, Canada	Individual Men's Sabre	1st
2019-06-30	Toronto, Canada	Team Men's Sabre	1st
2022-06-03	Asunción, Paraguay	Individual Men's Sabre	2nd
2022-06-04	Asunción, Paraguay	Team Men's Sabre	1st
2023-06-20	Lima, Peru	Team Men's Sabre	1st
2024-06-27	Lima, Peru	Individual Men's Sabre	1st
2024-06-30	Lima, Peru	Team Men's Sabre	1st

== See also ==
- List of select Jewish fencers
- List of NCAA fencing champions
