= Katherine Miller =

Brazilian American fencer (born 1994)

Personal information
- Nationality: Brazilian
- Born: 9 May 1994 (age 32) New York City, U.S.
- Height: 1.80 m (5 ft 11 in)

Sport
- Country: Brazil
- Sport: Fencing
Medal record
Pan American Fencing Championships
Bronze medal – third place	2016 Panama	Team épée
Bronze medal – third place	2017 Montreal	Team épée

Katherine Miller (born May 9, 1994) is a Brazilian American fencer who was a member of Brazil's women's epee team at the 2016 Summer Olympics. She won the 2013 Brazilian Senior National Championship and was a member of Brazil's bronze medal-winning women's epee team at the 2016 Pan American Championships

Miller studied global affairs at Yale University, where she was captain of the fencing team.
