= Daryl Homer =

American fencer (born 1990)

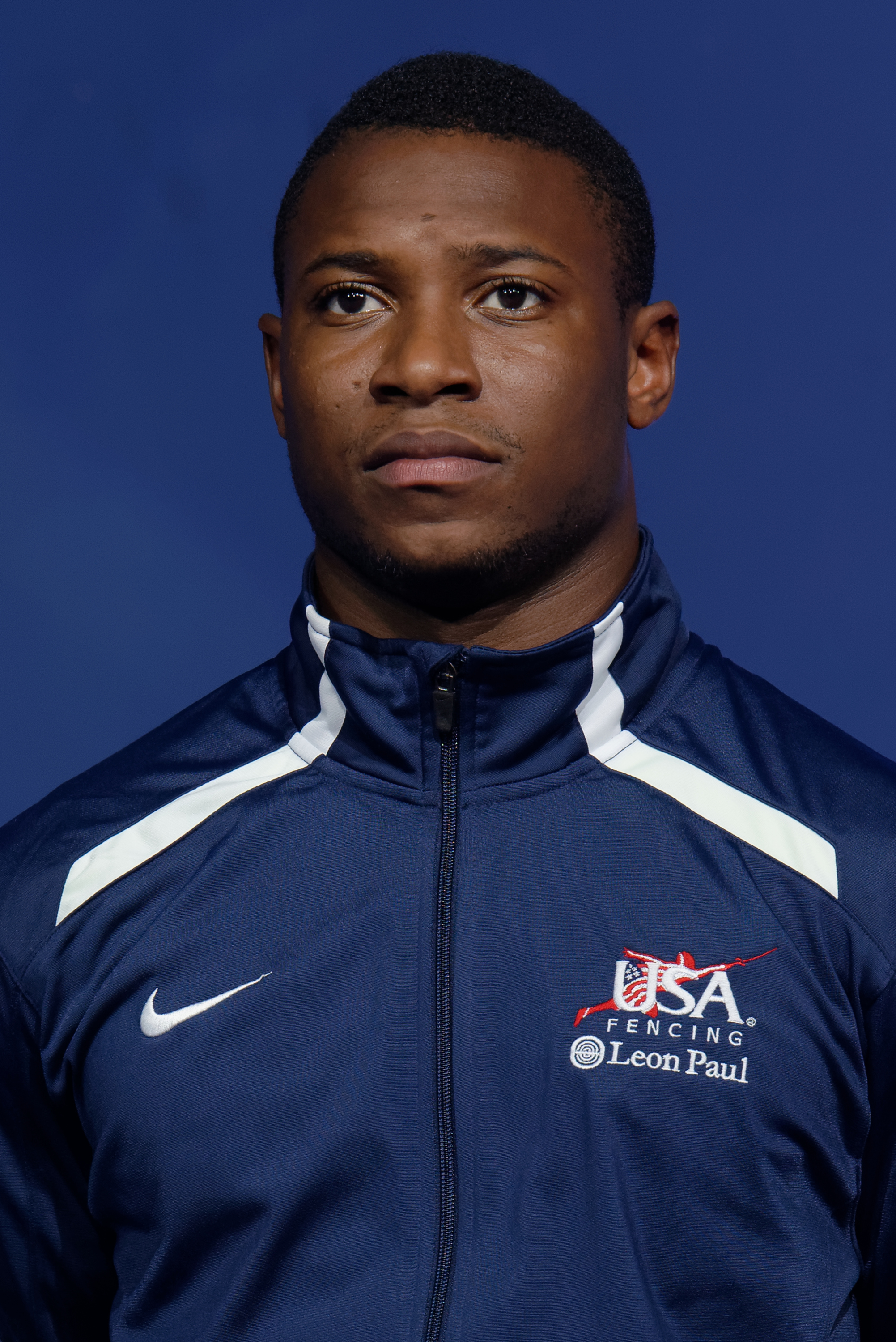
- Homer at 2015 World Championships

Personal information
- Full name: Daryl D. Homer
- Born: July 16, 1990 (age 36) Saint Thomas, U.S. Virgin Islands
- Height: 5 ft 7 in (1.71 m)
- Weight: 187 lb (85 kg)

Fencing career
- Sport: Fencing
- Country: United States
- Weapon: Sabre
- Hand: right-handed
- National coach: Yury Gelman
- FIE ranking: current ranking
Medal record
Men's sabre
Representing the United States
Olympic Games
Silver medal – second place	2016 Rio de Janeiro	Individual
World Championships
Silver medal – second place	2015 Moscow	Individual
Pan American Games
Gold medal – first place	2015 Toronto	Team
Gold medal – first place	2019 Lima	Individual
Gold medal – first place	2019 Lima	Team
Pan American Championships
Gold medal – first place	2010 San José	Team
Gold medal – first place	2011 Reno	Individual
Gold medal – first place	2011 Reno	Team
Gold medal – first place	2012 Cancún	Team
Gold medal – first place	2013 Cartagena	Team
Gold medal – first place	2014 San José	Team
Gold medal – first place	2016 Panama City	Team
Gold medal – first place	2017 Montréal	Individual
Gold medal – first place	2017 Montréal	Team
Gold medal – first place	2018 Havana	Team
Gold medal – first place	2019 Toronto	Team
Gold medal – first place	2022 Asunción	Individual
Gold medal – first place	2022 Asunción	Team
Silver medal – second place	2015 Santiago	Individual
Silver medal – second place	2019 Toronto	Individual
Bronze medal – third place	2013 Cartagena	Individual
Bronze medal – third place	2014 San José	Individual
Bronze medal – third place	2018 Havana	Individual

Daryl D. Homer (born July 16, 1990) is an American right-handed saber fencer, three-time Olympian, and 2016 individual Olympic silver medalist.

Homer competed in the 2012 London Olympic Games, the 2016 Rio de Janeiro Olympic Games, and the 2020 Tokyo Olympic Games.

Homer is a ten-time team Pan American champion and three-time individual Pan American champion.

== Personal life ==
Homer was born on St. Thomas, U.S. Virgin Islands, to Juliette Smith and Daryl Homer. At the age of five, Homer moved to New York City with his mother and younger sister D’Meca, to an apartment on Gun Hill Road in the Bronx. Homer attended Public School 21 there before going to Salesian High School in New Rochelle. He eventually graduated from St. John's University, with a degree in advertising communications. He now works for advertising and marketing agency Anomaly.

Homer speaks to inner city youth about balancing his career with his athletic passions. He is a brand ambassador at Fencing in the Schools, a non-profit that aims to enrich the lives of students in the inner city through fencing. The program focuses on the health benefits, life skills, and exposure fencing can provide students in impoverished neighborhoods.

== Fencing career ==
Homer started fencing at the age of 11, after happening on a picture of a masked fencer in the dictionary, and finding it "very cool". He joined the Peter Westbrook Foundation in New York City, a program dedicated to exposing inner city youth to fencing started by six-time Olympian and 1984 Olympic bronze medalist Peter Westbrook. Homer chose saber because Westbrook himself had been a sabreur.

Homer was quickly identified as a talented athlete, and began working with four-time Olympic coach Yury Gelman immediately. He won a bronze medal at the 2007 Cadet World Fencing Championships, and another bronze at the 2009 Junior World Championships in Belfast. That same year he competed in his first senior World Championships in Antalya, finishing 23rd, and took the NCAA title as a sophomore.

In the 2009–10 season Homer defended successfully his NCAA title. At the 2010 World Championships in Paris he defeated successively France's Boladé Apithy and Nicolas Lopez to reach the round of 16, and finished 12th. The next season, he won the gold medal at the 2011 Pan American Championships.

He redshirted the following season to train for the 2012 Summer Olympics, for which he qualified as a member of the top-ranked team of the Americas zone. In the individual event he defeated 15–9 Romania's Tiberiu Dolniceanu in the first round, then had a narrow 15–14 victory of world No. 2, Russia's Aleksey Yakimenko. He lost 15–14 in the quarter-finals to another Romanian, Rareș Dumitrescu, and finished sixth. In the team event, the USA lost to Russia in the quarter-finals and finished eighth. He finished the 2011–12 season no. 12 in FIE rankings.

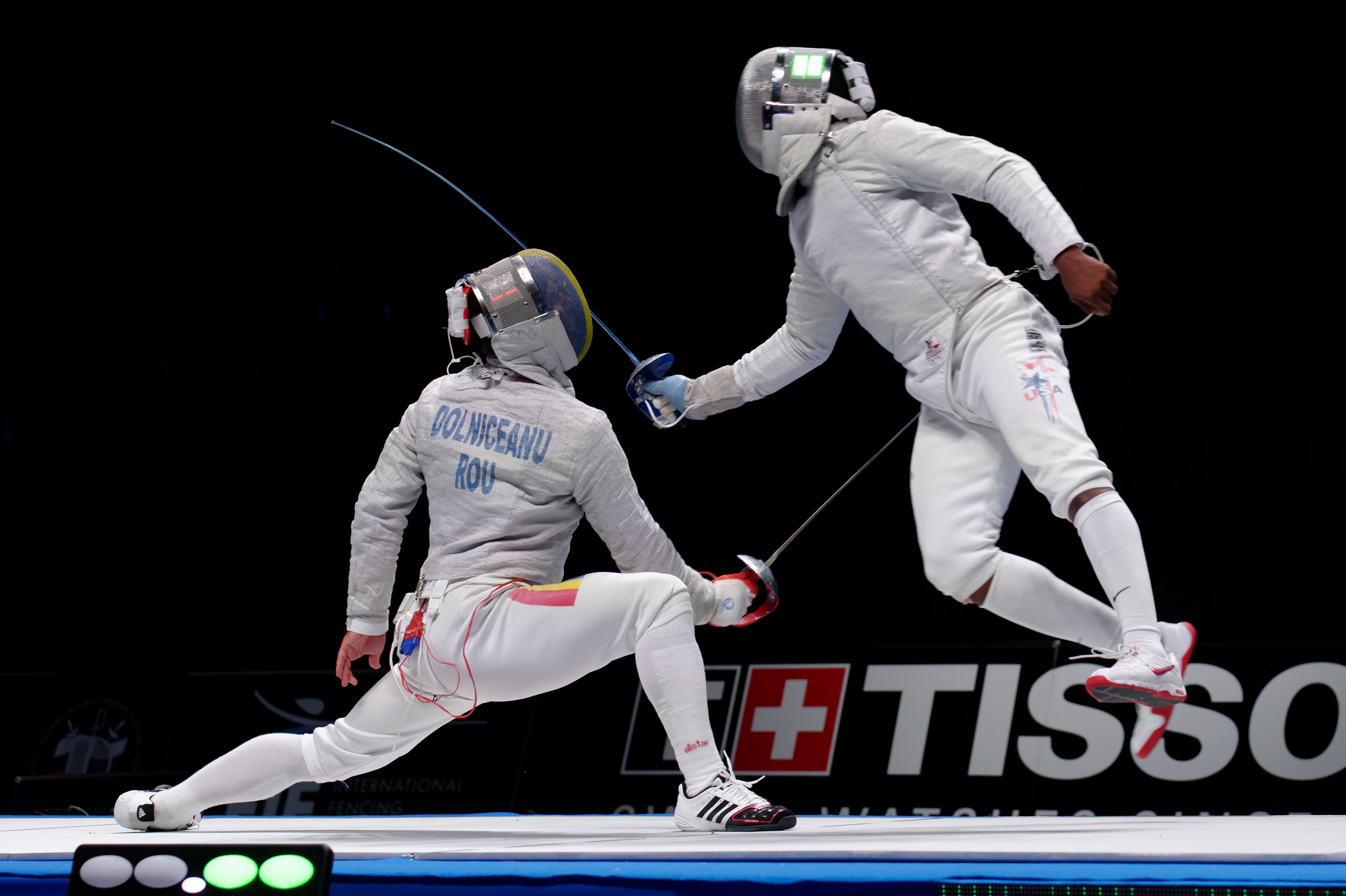
Homer (R) scores from a flunge at the 2015 World Fencing Championships

Homer maintained this ranking in the next season thanks to three quarter-final placings in the World Cup and a bronze medal at the 2013 Pan American Championships. He placed 11th at the end of the 2013–14 season. In the 2014–15 season he climbed his first World Cup podium with a bronze medal in the Seoul Grand Prix.

As of July 1, 2016, he was ranked #2 in the United States, behind Team USA teammate Eli Dershwitz.

He competed for the United States in fencing at the 2016 Summer Olympics. He won the silver medal. He became the first U.S. medalist in men's saber since Peter Westbrook won a bronze medal in 1984 and the first U.S. men's silver medalist since William Grebe in 1904. The U.S. has never won gold in men's saber. Shortly after his Olympic silver medal, he left long-time coach Yury Gelman and the Manhattan Fencing Center for another coach.

He qualified to represent the United States in fencing at the 2020 Olympics in Tokyo in 2021.

== Medal record ==
=== Olympic Games ===
Year	Location	Event	Position
2016	Rio de Janeiro, Brazil	Individual Men's Sabre	2nd

=== World Championship ===
Year	Location	Event	Position
2015	Moscow, Russia	Individual Men's Sabre	2nd

=== Grand Prix ===
Date	Location	Event	Position
2015-03-28	Seoul, South Korea	Individual Men's Sabre	3rd

=== World Cup ===
Date	Location	Event	Position
2016-11-04	Dakar, Senegal	Individual Men's Sabre	3rd
2018-05-18	Madrid, Spain	Individual Men's Sabre	3rd
2025-01-26	Plovdiv, Bulgaria	Team Men's Sabre	2nd
2025-03-08	Padua, Italy	Team Men's Sabre	2nd

=== Pan American Championship ===
Date	Location	Event	Position
2010	San José, Costa Rica	Team Men's Sabre	1st
2011	(United States) Reno, Nevada	Individual Men's Sabre	1st
2011	(United States) Reno, Nevada	Team Men's Sabre	1st
2012	Cancún, Mexico	Team Men's Sabre	1st
2013	Cartagena, Colombia	Individual Men's Sabre	3rd
2013	Cartagena, Colombia	Team Men's Sabre	1st
2014	San José, Costa Rica	Individual Men's Sabre	3rd
2014	San José, Costa Rica	Team Men's Sabre	1st
2015	Santiago, Chile	Individual Men's Sabre	2nd
2016	Panama City, Panama	Team Men's Sabre	1st
2017	Montreal, Canada	Individual Men's Sabre	1st
2017	Montreal, Canada	Team Men's Sabre	1st
2018	Havana, Cuba	Individual Men's Sabre	3rd
2018	Havana, Cuba	Team Men's Sabre	1st
2019	Toronto, Canada	Individual Men's Sabre	2nd
2019	Toronto, Canada	Team Men's Sabre	1st
2022	Asunción, Paraguay	Individual Men's Sabre	1st
2022	Asunción, Paraguay	Team Men's Sabre	1st

== See also ==
- List of USFA Division I National Champions
- List of NCAA fencing champions
