= Paola Pliego =

Mexican fencer (born 1994)

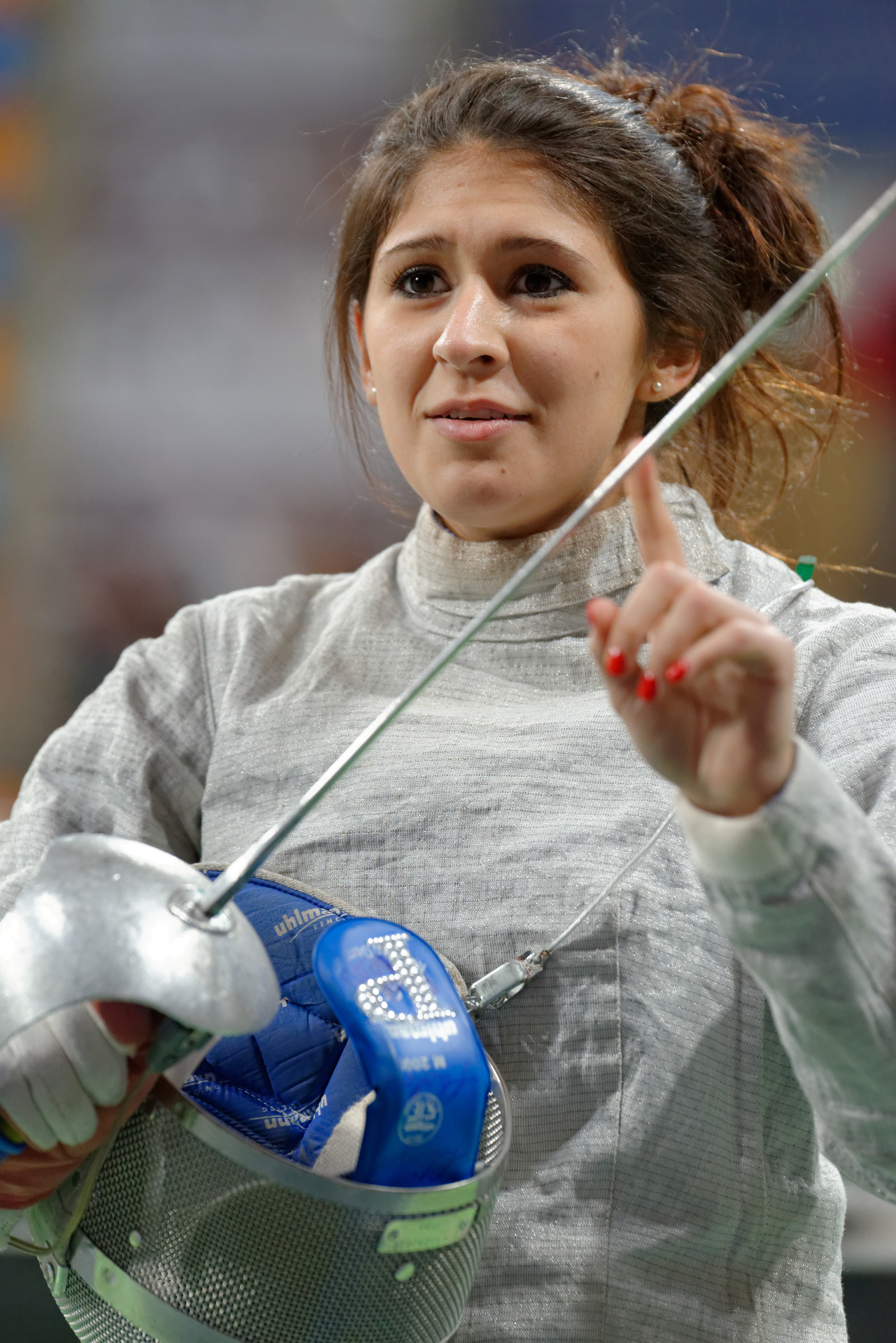
- Portrait of Paola Pliego

Personal information
- Full name: María Paola Pliego Lara
- Born: 27 September 1994 (age 32) Mexico City, Mexico
- Height: 1.67 m (5 ft 6 in)
- Weight: 60 kg (130 lb)

Fencing career
- Sport: Fencing
- Country: Mexico (2009-19); Uzbekistan (2019-present)
- Weapon: sabre
- Hand: right-handed
- FIE ranking: current ranking
Medal record
Women's sabre
Representing Mexico
Pan American Championships
Silver medal – second place	2015 Santiago	Team
Bronze medal – third place	2015 Santiago	Individual
Silver medal – second place	2016 Panama	Team
Bronze medal – third place	2016 Panama	Individual
Gold medal – first place	2017 Montreal	Individual
Gold medal – first place	2017 Montreal	Team
Women's sabre
Representing Uzbekistan
Islamic Solidarity Games
Silver medal – second place	2021 Konya	Team
Asian Games
Gold medal – first place	2022 Hangzhou	Team

María Paola Pliego Lara (born September 27, 1994, in Mexico City), known as Paola Pliego, is a Mexican-born naturalized Uzbekistani sabre fencer, bronze medallist at the 2015 Pan American Fencing Championships. Citing corruption of the Mexican Olympic Committee (mainly, Carlos Padilla Becerra, its president) as the main reason, she competed under the flag of Uzbekistan at the 2019 Fencing World Cup.

== Career ==
Pliego became interested in fencing at the age of four after watching a fencing scene in The Parent Trap. She was too small to train at the time, but persisted in her interest and eventually took courses with her sister. She started to compete when she was a teenager. After she earned her first medals at the Mexican national championships, she trained at the Oregon Fencing Alliance, alongside twice-Olympic champion Mariel Zagunis.

With 150 points Pliego in 2013–2014 season ends as number 1 seeded of FIE's junior women saber ranking

Pliego won the 2013–14 Fencing World Cup in the junior category. In the 2014–15 season, she ranked second at the Cancún satellite tournament. She won a bronze medal at the 2015 Pan American Championships in Santiago after losing 10–15 in the semifinals to USA's Dagmara Wozniak. She went on to take the silver medal with the team.

In 2016, she wrongfully tested positive for forbidden substances days before the Rio 2016 Olympics, which ended her Olympic dream. She was cleared of any wrongdoing shortly after.

She overcame these circumstances and in 2017, she also won the Panamerican Individual Championship for the first time ever for a Mexican Sabre Fencer.

Even with these results she was never called up to represent Mexico on international events ever again.

In 2019, she announced she would compete under the flag of Uzbekistan at the 2019 Fencing World Cup, citing corruption of the Mexican Olympic Committee as the main reason for this decision.

In April 2020, a tribunal forced the Sports Commission (CONADE) to compensate Paola with 15 million pesos (US$750,000), for the damages caused to her career.
