= Francesca Russo =

American fencer (born 1995)

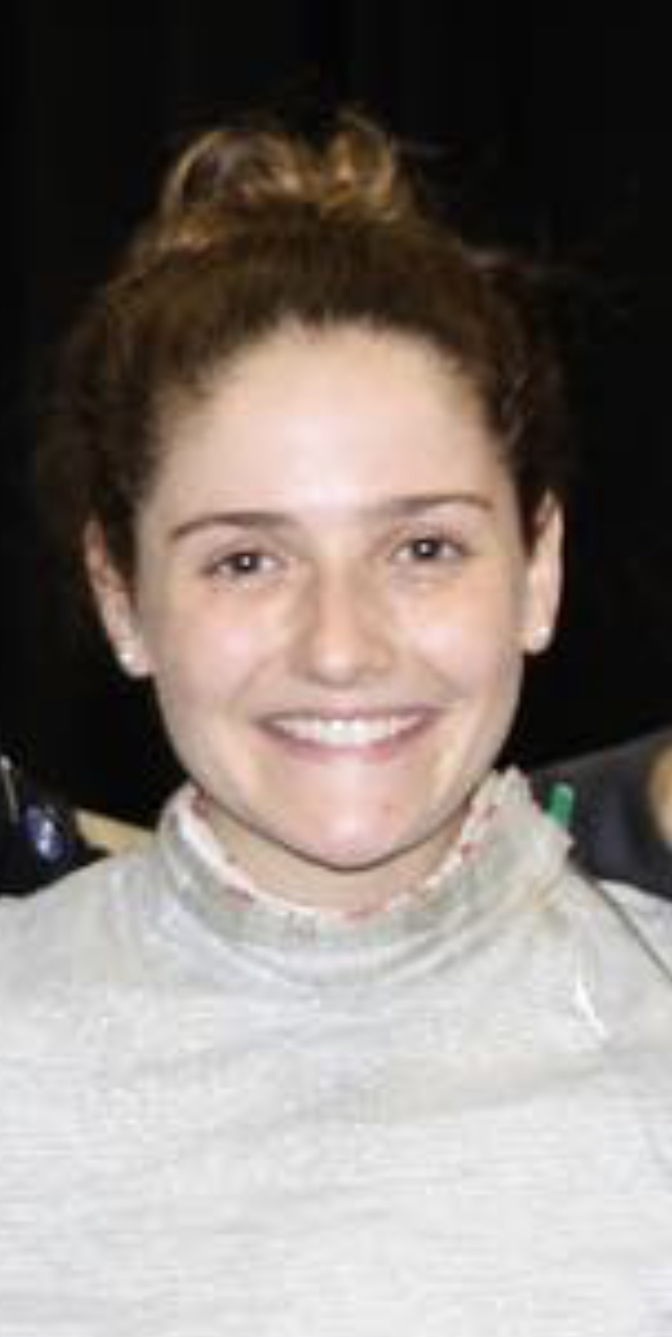
- Francesca Russo at the 2019 Women’s Sabre Fencing NAC in Charlotte

Personal information
- Nationality: American
- Born: November 27, 1995 (age 30)

Sport
- Sport: Fencing
- College team: Notre Dame

Francesca Russo (born November 27, 1995) is an American fencer. She qualified to represent Team USA at the 2020 Tokyo Summer Olympics, competing as part of the Women's Sabre team.

Raised in Wayne, New Jersey, Russo attended Wayne Valley High School.

== Career highlights ==
- Four-time NCAA Champion
- World Team Champ
