= Marc-Antoine Blais Bélanger =

Canadian fencer

Personal information
- Born: February 20, 1995 (age 31) Montreal, Quebec, Canada
- Height: 181 cm (5 ft 11 in)
- Weight: 84 kg (185 lb)
Medal record
Men's fencing
Representing Canada
Pan American Championships
| Bronze medal – third place | 2017 Montreal | Team épée |
Junior Pan American Championships
| Gold medal – first place | 2015 | Individual épée |
| Gold medal – first place | 2015 | Team épée |
| Gold medal – first place | 2013 | Individual épée |
| Bronze medal – third place | 2014 | Individual épée |

Marc-Antoine Blais Bélanger (born February 20, 1995) is a Canadian fencer in the épée discipline. Blais Bélanger has competed internationally for Canada since 2013.

== Career ==
=== Olympics ===
Blais Bélanger represented Canada at the 2020 Summer Olympics, after winning the individual men's épée competition at the Pan American Zonal Qualifier in San José, Costa Rica.

== See also ==
- List of Canadian sports personalities
