= Tania Arrayales =

Mexican sabre fencer

Personal information
- Born: 1 August 1996 (age 29)
- Home town: Tijuana, Mexico
- Height: 1.58 m (5 ft 2 in)
- Weight: 53 kg (117 lb)

Fencing career
- Sport: Fencing
- Country: Mexico
- Weapon: sabre
- Hand: right-handed
- FIE ranking: current ranking

Tania Arrayales (born 1 August 1996) is a Mexican sabre fencer.
