= Pan American Fencing Confederation =

International sports body

The Pan American Fencing Confederation (PAFC) is an international body created in 1951, charged with the promotion and development of the sport of fencing in the Americas. Affiliated to the International Fencing Federation (FIE) and to the Pan American Sports Organization, it is composed of 32 member national federations. It organises each year the Pan American Fencing Championships at cadet, junior, senior and veteran levels. Its official languages are English and Spanish.

Since 2011 the PAFC was presided by El Salvador's David Munguía Payés. He was as such a member of the executive committee of the FIE. The President of the 2015-2020 PAFC executive committee is Vitaly Logvin Grechuhin.
