= Fernando Scavasin =

Brazilian fencer (born 1984)

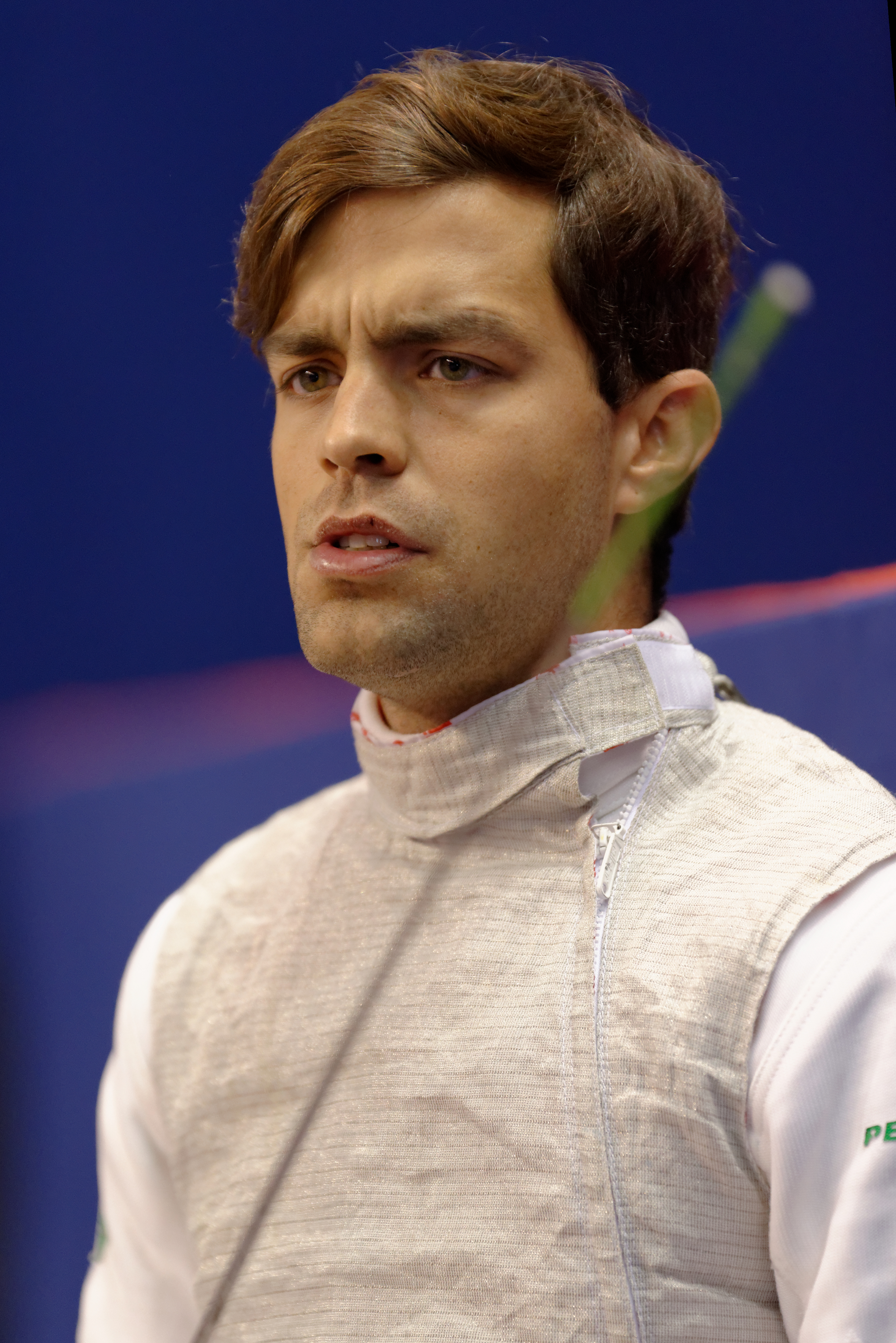
- Scavasin at the team event of the 2015 Challenge International de Paris

Personal information
- Born: 24 November 1984 (age 41) São Paulo, Brazil
- Height: 1.84 m (6 ft 0 in)
- Weight: 80 kg (180 lb)

Fencing career
- Sport: Fencing
- Country: Brazil
- Weapon: foil
- Hand: right-handed
Medal record
Representing Brazil
Pan American Games
Silver medal – second place	2015 Toronto	Team foil
Bronze medal – third place	2011 Guadalajara	Team foil

Fernando Augusto Scavasin (born November 24, 1984) is a Brazilian fencer.

== Achievements ==
=== Pan American Games ===
Guadalajara 2011: Bronze in the foil team event.
Toronto 2015: Silver in the foil team event.
