= Maxime Brinck-Croteau =

Canadian fencer (born 1986)

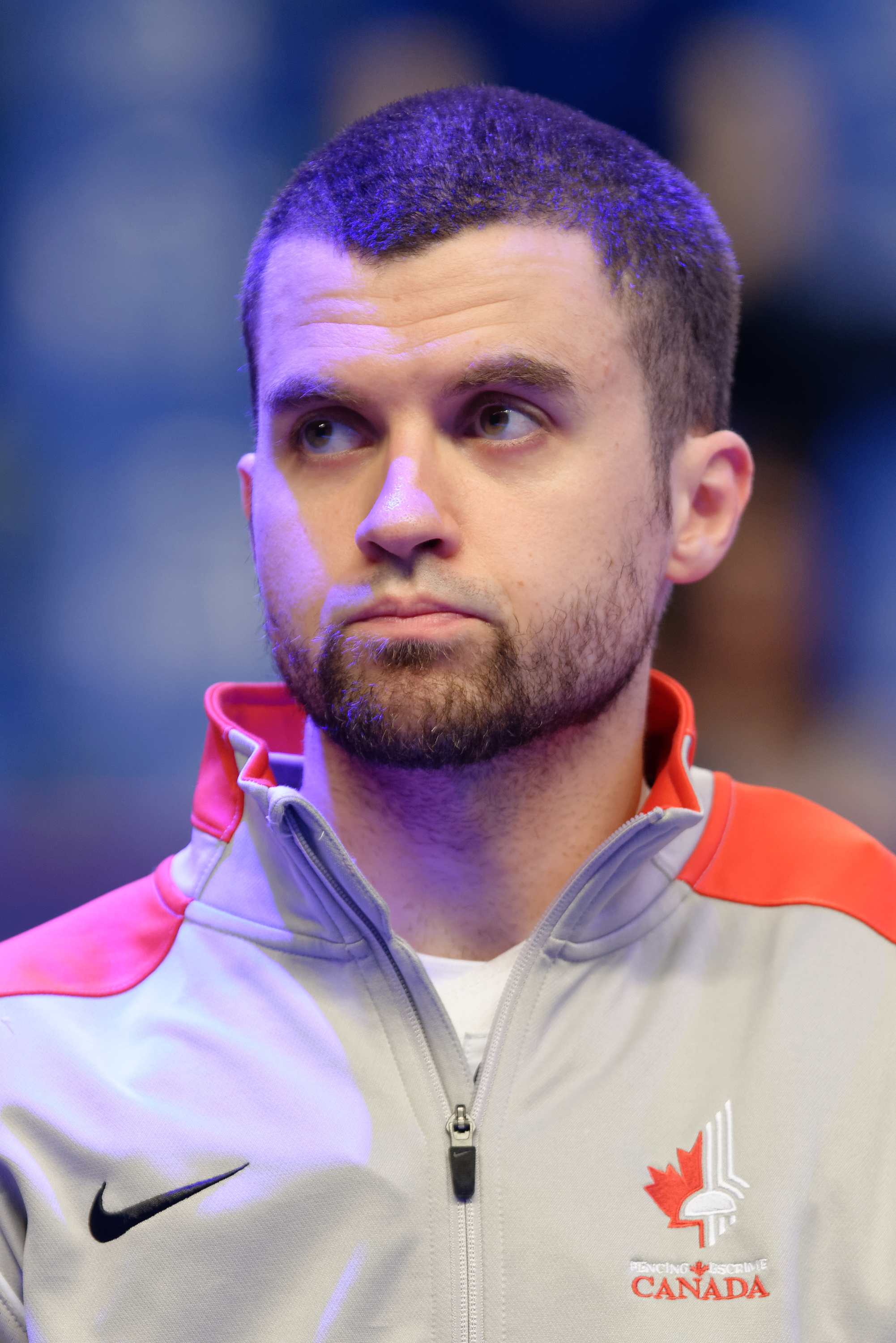

Personal information
- Born: March 29, 1986 Amos, Quebec, Canada
- Height: 178 cm (5 ft 10 in)
- Weight: 79 kg (174 lb)

Sport
- Country: Canada
- Sport: Fencing
Medal record
Pan American Fencing Championships
| Silver medal – second place | 2015 Santiago | Individual épée |
| Bronze medal – third place | 2016 Panama City | Individual épée |
- Updated on 25 March 2016

Maxime Brinck-Croteau (born March 29, 1986) is a male épée fencer from Canada. Brinck-Croteau won the silver medal at the 2015 Pan American Championships in Santiago, and later competed at the 2015 Pan American Games, in Toronto, Ontario.

Brinck-Croteau qualified to represent his country at the 2016 Summer Olympics, by being ranked in the top two in the Americas. He was trained by Michel Dessureault and Xiao Jian.
