= Jeff Spear =

American fencer (born 1988)

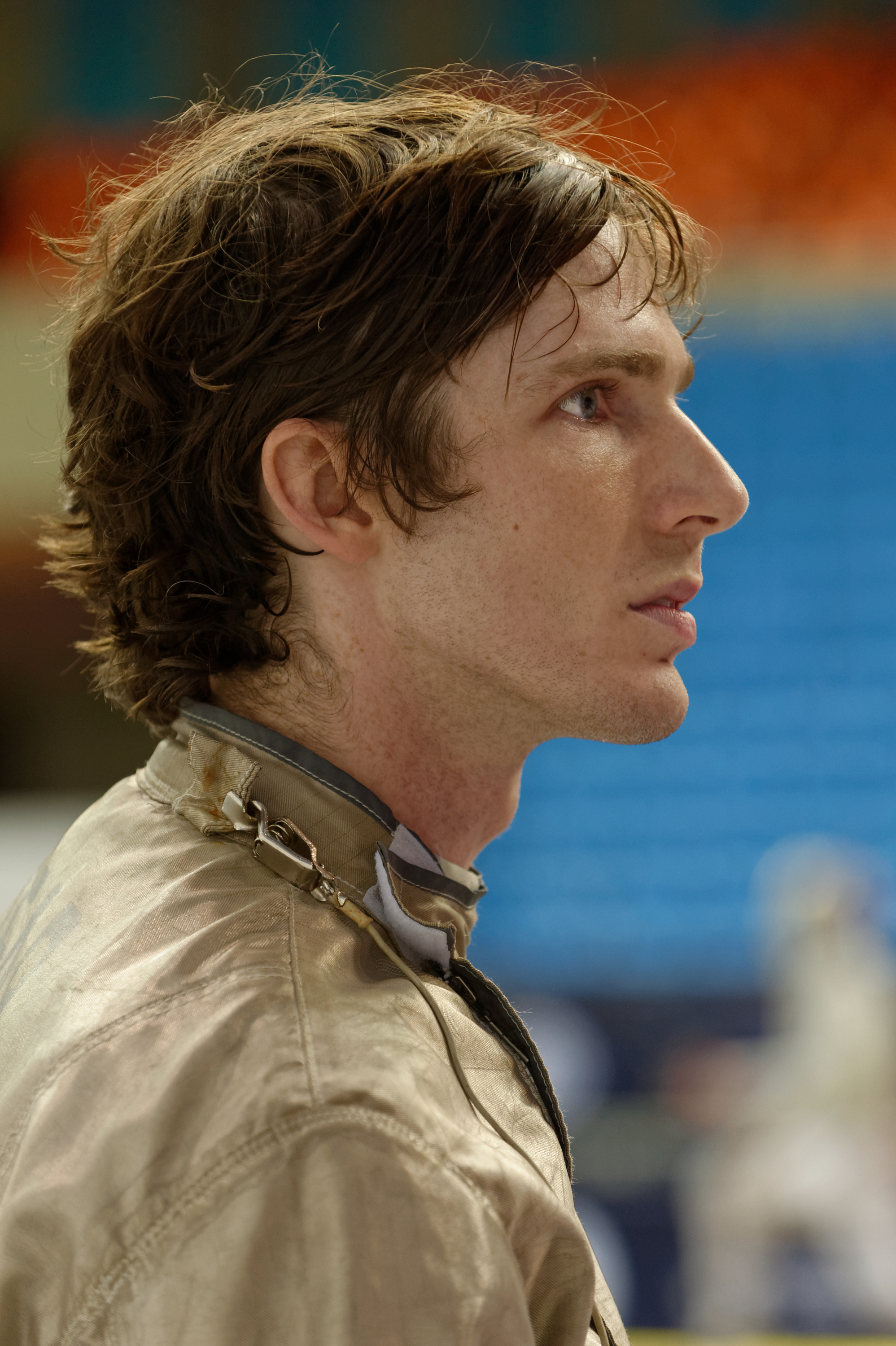
- Spear at the 2015 World Fencing Championships

Personal information
- Full name: Jeffrey Kimball Spear
- Born: June 28, 1988 (age 38) Albany, New York, USA
- Height: 1.88 m (6 ft 2 in)
- Weight: 76 kg (168 lb; 12.0 st)

Fencing career
- Sport: Fencing
- Country: (United States) USA
- Weapon: Sabre
- Hand: Left-handed
- Club: New York Athletic Club
- FIE ranking: current ranking
Medal record
Representing United States
Pan American Games
Gold medal – first place	2015 Toronto	Team sabre
Gold medal – first place	2019 Lima	Team sabre

Jeff Spear (born June 28, 1988) is an American sabre fencer. He competed in the men's team sabre competition at the 2012 Summer Olympics.

He fenced for the Columbia Lions fencing team. Spear graduated from Columbia University in 2010 as the salutatorian of Columbia College.

== See also ==
- List of USFA Division I National Champions
- List of NCAA fencing champions
