= Sabrina Massialas =

American fencer

Personal information
- Nationality: American
- Born: January 22, 1997 (age 29) San Francisco, California
- Height: 5 ft 10 in (178 cm)

Sport
- Sport: Fencing
Medal record
Women's foil
Representing the United States
Youth Olympic Games
Gold medal – first place	2014 Nanjing	Individual
Junior World Championships
Silver medal – second place	2015 Tashkent	Team
Silver medal – second place	2017 Plovdiv	Team

Sabrina Massialas (born January 22, 1997) is an American fencer. She qualified to represent Team USA at the 2020 Summer Olympics, competing as part of the Women's Foil Team, which ranked 4th.

== Career ==
Massialas was the first U.S. fencer ever to win a Youth Olympic Games gold medal in 2014. She also fenced at Notre Dame, where she was a two-time ACC champion (2016, 2017) and a four-time NCAA All-American (2016–2019).
