= Fencing at the 2023 Pan American Games =

- Fencing pictogram
- Venue: Paralympic Training Center
- Start date: October 30, 2023
- End date: November 4, 2023
- No. of events: (6 men, 6 women)
- Competitors: 159 from 16 nations

Fencing competitions at the 2023 Pan American Games in Santiago, Chile are scheduled to be held between October 30 and November 4, 2023. The fencing events will be held at the Paralympic Training Center, located in the National Stadium Park cluster in Santiago.

12 medal events are scheduled to be contested, in the three disciplines of épée, foil and sabre. In each discipline an individual and team event will be held for each gender. A total of 162 fencers qualified to compete at the games.

== Qualification ==
A total of up to 162 fencers will qualify to compete. Each nation may enter a maximum of 18 athletes (nine per gender), unless they qualified an athlete via the Cali 2021 Junior Pan American Games. The gold medalists in the individual events of Cali 2021 received a nominal place for the Santiago 2023 Pan American Games. If the athletes who qualified at the Cali 2021 Junior Pan American Games do not participate in the Santiago 2023 Pan American Games, said place will be forfeited and cannot be transferred to another NOC or athlete. The top seven teams at the 2022 Pan American Championships, along with the top two individuals not qualified through the team event will qualify for each respective discipline per gender. The host nation, Chile, automatically qualifies the maximum number of fencers (18). A maximum of two athletes from one NOC can enter the individual events. Only the winning countries in Cali will have the advantage of competing with 3 fencers in the individual event in case of having qualified for Santiago 2023 with the team of their respective weapon.

== Participating nations ==
A total of 16 NOC's qualified fencers. The number of athletes a nation entered is in parentheses beside the name of the country.

- Argentina (18)
- Brazil (18)
- Canada (18)
- Chile (19)
- Colombia (18)
- Costa Rica (3)
- Cuba (4)
- Ecuador (1)
- Mexico (16)
- Panama (1)
- Paraguay (1)
- Peru (6)
- Puerto Rico (3)
- United States (16)
- Venezuela (16)
- Virgin Islands (1)

== Medal summary ==
=== Medal table ===
* Host nation (Chile)

Rank	Nation	Gold	Silver	Bronze	Total
1	United States	8	3	0	11
2	Canada	2	6	4	12
3	Brazil	1	0	4	5
4	Argentina	1	0	2	3
5	Venezuela	0	1	3	4
6	Chile*	0	1	1	2
7	Peru	0	1	0	1
8	Mexico	0	0	3	3
9	Cuba	0	0	1	1
Totals (9 entries)		12	12	18	42

=== Medalists ===
==== Men's ====
Event	Gold	Silver	Bronze
Individual épée	Dylan French; Canada	Pablo Núñez; Chile	Francisco Limardo; Venezuela
Individual épée	Dylan French; Canada	Pablo Núñez; Chile	Alexandre Camargo; Brazil
Team épée	United States; Curtis McDowald; Samuel Imrek; Samuel Larsen	Canada; Fynn Fafard; Dylan French; Nicholas Zhang	Argentina; Jesús Lugones; Alessandro Taccani; Agustín Gusmán
Individual foil	Nick Itkin; United States	Miles Chamley-Watson; United States	Augusto Servello; Argentina
Individual foil	Nick Itkin; United States	Miles Chamley-Watson; United States	Guilherme Toldo; Brazil
Team foil	United States; Gerek Meinhardt; Nick Itkin; Miles Chamley-Watson	Canada; Maximilien Van Haaster; Blake Broszus; Patrick Liu	Brazil; Pedro Marostega; Guilherme Toldo; Henrique Marques
Individual sabre	Andrew Doddo; United States	Eliécer Romero; Venezuela	Fares Arfa; Canada
Individual sabre	Andrew Doddo; United States	Eliécer Romero; Venezuela	Shaul Gordon; Canada
Team sabre	Canada; Francois Cauchon; Shaul Gordon; Fares Arfa	United States; Josef Cohen; Andrew Doddo; Filip Dolegiewicz	Venezuela; Abraham Rodríguez; Eliécer Romero; José Quintero

==== Women's ====
Event	Gold	Silver	Bronze
Individual épée	Isabel Di Tella; Argentina	María Luisa Doig; Peru	Analía Fernández; Chile
Individual épée	Isabel Di Tella; Argentina	María Luisa Doig; Peru	Ruien Xiao; Canada
Team épée	Brazil; Amanda Simeão; Nathalie Moellhausen; Victória Vizeu	Canada; Alexanne Verret; Ruien Xiao; Leonora MacKinnon	Venezuela; Eliana Lugo; Lizzie Asis; María Martínez
Individual foil	Lee Kiefer; United States	Eleanor Harvey; Canada	Jessica Guo; Canada
Individual foil	Lee Kiefer; United States	Eleanor Harvey; Canada	Mariana Pistoia; Brazil
Team foil	United States; Jacqueline Dubrovich; Lee Kiefer; Zander Rhodes	Canada; Jessica Guo; Sabrina Fang; Eleanor Harvey	Mexico; Nataly Michel; Denisse Hernández; Melissa Rebolledo
Individual sabre	Magda Skarbonkiewicz; United States	Maia Chamberlain; United States	Julieta Toledo; Mexico
Individual sabre	Magda Skarbonkiewicz; United States	Maia Chamberlain; United States	Leidis Veranes; Cuba
Team sabre	United States; Maia Chamberlain; Magda Skarbonkiewicz; Alexis Anglade	Canada; Pamela Brind'Amour; Marissa Ponich; Tamar Gordon	Mexico; Natalia Botello; Diana González; Julieta Toledo

== See also ==
- Fencing at the 2024 Summer Olympics
