= Men's foil at the 2022 World Fencing Championships =

- Venue: Cairo Stadium Indoor Halls Complex
- Location: Cairo, Egypt
- Dates: 17 July (qualification); 20 July
- Competitors: 156 from 54 nations

Medalists
gold medal	Enzo Lefort	France
silver medal	Tommaso Marini	Italy
bronze medal	Cheung Ka Long	Hong Kong
bronze medal	Nick Itkin	United States

The Men's foil competition at the 2022 World Fencing Championships was held on 20 July 2022. The qualification was held on 17 July.

== Draw ==
=== Finals ===
Semifinals
(Hong Kong) Cheung Ka Long	12
(Italy) Tommaso Marini	15
(United States) Nick Itkin	14
(France) Enzo Lefort	15

Final
(Italy) Tommaso Marini	14
(France) Enzo Lefort	15

=== Top half ===
==== Section 1 ====
Round of 64
(Hong Kong) Cheung Ka Long	15
(Croatia) Ivan Komšić	11
(Cyprus) Alex Tofalides	10
(Ukraine) Danyil Hoida	15
(United States) Alexander Massialas	15
(China) Mo Ziwei	3
(South Korea) Chung Jyae-gyu	15
(United Kingdom) Marcus Mepstead	14
(Czech Republic) Alexander Choupenitch	15
(South Korea) Heo Jun	6
(Denmark) Jonas Winterberg-Poulsen	15
(Germany) Andre Sanita	10
(Hong Kong) Yeung Chi Ka	4
(Hungary) Dániel Dósa	15
(Austria) Tobias Reichetzer	5
(Hong Kong) Ryan Choi	15

Round of 32
(Hong Kong) Cheung Ka Long	15
(Ukraine) Danyil Hoida	11
(United States) Alexander Massialas	15
(South Korea) Chung Jyae-gyu	10
(Czech Republic) Alexander Choupenitch	15
(Denmark) Jonas Winterberg-Poulsen	10
(Hungary) Dániel Dósa	15
(Hong Kong) Ryan Choi	13

Round of 16
(Hong Kong) Cheung Ka Long	15
(United States) Alexander Massialas	5
(Czech Republic) Alexander Choupenitch	15
(Hungary) Dániel Dósa	8

Quarterfinals
(Hong Kong) Cheung Ka Long	15
(Czech Republic) Alexander Choupenitch	14

==== Section 2 ====
Round of 64
(Egypt) Alaaeldin Abouelkassem	15
(United Kingdom) Dominic de Almeida	8
(Israel) Raz Goren	11
(United Kingdom) Kristjan Archer	15
(South Korea) Im Cheol-woo	15
(Brazil) Lorenzo Mion	7
(France) Alexandre Sido	15
(Japan) Kyosuke Matsuyama	11
(Italy) Giorgio Avola	14
(Argentina) Augusto Servello	15
(Venezuela) Antonio Leal	10
(United States) Chase Emmer	15
(Hong Kong) Lawrence Ng	14
(United States) Gerek Meinhardt	15
(Chinese Taipei) Chen Yi-tung	5
(Italy) Tommaso Marini	15

Round of 32
(Egypt) Alaaeldin Abouelkassem	15
(United Kingdom) Kristjan Archer	7
(South Korea) Im Cheol-woo	12
(France) Alexandre Sido	15
(Argentina) Augusto Servello	15
(United States) Chase Emmer	8
(United States) Gerek Meinhardt	13
(Italy) Tommaso Marini	15

Round of 16
(Egypt) Alaaeldin Abouelkassem	15
(France) Alexandre Sido	11
(Argentina) Augusto Servello	3
(Italy) Tommaso Marini	15

Quarterfinals
(Egypt) Alaaeldin Abouelkassem	9
(Italy) Tommaso Marini	15

=== Bottom half ===
==== Section 3 ====
Round of 64
(Italy) Alessio Foconi	15
(Uzbekistan) Mukhammad Asranov	8
(Canada) Eli Schenkel	13
(Croatia) Petar Fileš	15
(Poland) Andrzej Rządkowski	15
(Chinese Taipei) Chen Chih-chieh	6
(Austria) Moritz Lechner	7
(Spain) Carlos Llavador	15
(United States) Nick Itkin	15
(United Kingdom) James-Andrew Davis	6
(Belgium) Stef Van Campenhout	5
(China) Xu Jie	15
(Japan) Kazuki Imura	13
(Poland) Leszek Rajski	15
(Austria) Maximilian Ettelt	10
(Japan) Takahiro Shikine	15

Round of 32
(Italy) Alessio Foconi	15
(Croatia) Petar Fileš	10
(Poland) Andrzej Rządkowski	9
(Spain) Carlos Llavador	15
(United States) Nick Itkin	15
(China) Xu Jie	11
(Poland) Leszek Rajski	10
(Japan) Takahiro Shikine	15

Round of 16
(Italy) Alessio Foconi	15
(Spain) Carlos Llavador	6
(United States) Nick Itkin	15
(Japan) Takahiro Shikine	13

Quarterfinals
(Italy) Alessio Foconi	5
(United States) Nick Itkin	15

==== Section 4 ====
Round of 64
(Egypt) Mohamed Hamza	15
(Poland) Adrian Wojtkowiak	7
(Ukraine) Klod Yunes	15
(South Korea) Ha Tae-gyu	12
(Netherlands) Daniel Giacon	15
(Netherlands) Dirk Jan van Egmond	10
(Ukraine) Andriy Pohrebnyak	2
(France) Enzo Lefort	15
(France) Maximilien Chastanet	15
(Poland) Michał Siess	9
(Hungary) Gergő Szemes	15
(Brazil) Guilherme Toldo	10
(Mexico) Diego Cervantes	8
(France) Pierre Loisel	15
(Greece) Ilias Giannos Rizos	2
(Italy) Daniele Garozzo	15

Round of 32
(Egypt) Mohamed Hamza	15
(Ukraine) Klod Yunes	10
(Netherlands) Daniel Giacon	14
(France) Enzo Lefort	15
(France) Maximilien Chastanet	11
(Hungary) Gergő Szemes	15
(France) Pierre Loisel	13
(Italy) Daniele Garozzo	15

Round of 16
(Egypt) Mohamed Hamza	11
(France) Enzo Lefort	15
(Hungary) Gergő Szemes	15
(Italy) Daniele Garozzo	12

Quarterfinals
(France) Enzo Lefort	15
(Hungary) Gergő Szemes	3
