= Fencing at the 2023 Pan American Games – Men's foil =

Men's foil at the 2023 Pan American Games
- Venue: Paralympic Training Center
- Dates: October 31
- Competitors: 18 from 10 nations

Medalists
Gold medal	Nick Itkin	United States
Silver medal	Miles Chamley-Watson	United States
Bronze medal	Augusto Servello	Argentina
Bronze medal	Guilherme Toldo	Brazil

The men's foil competition of the fencing events at the 2023 Pan American Games was held on October 31 at the Paralympic Training Center.

The foil competition consisted of a qualification round followed by a single-elimination bracket with a bronze medal match between the two semifinal losers. Fencing was done to 15 touches or to the completion of three-minute rounds if neither fencer reached 15 touches by then. At the end of time, the higher-scoring fencer was the winner. A tie resulted in an additional one-minute sudden-death time period. This sudden-death period was further modified by the selection of a draw-winner beforehand; if neither fencer scored a touch during the minute, the predetermined draw-winner won the bout.

== Schedule ==
Date	Time	Round
October 31, 2023	13:00	Qualification pools
October 31, 2023	16:10	Round of 16
October 31, 2023	18:20	Quarterfinals
October 31, 2023	20:00	Semifinals
October 31, 2023	22:10	Final

== Results ==
The following are the results of the event.

=== Qualification ===
All 18 fencers were put into three groups of six athletes, were each fencer would have five individual matches. The top 14 athletes overall would qualify for next round.

Rank	Name	Nation	Victories	TG	TR	Dif.	Notes
1	Nick Itkin	United States	5	25	6	+19	Q
2	Guilherme Toldo	Brazil	5	25	10	+15	Q
3	Miles Chamley-Watson	United States	5	25	11	+14	Q
4	Nicolás Marino	Argentina	4	20	15	+5	Q
5	Gustavo Alarcón	Chile	3	22	14	+8	Q
6	Blake Broszus	Canada	3	19	14	+5	Q
7	Diego Cervantes	Mexico	3	19	16	+3	Q
8	Tommaso Archilei	Mexico	3	18	19	-1	Q
9	Kruz Schembri	Virgin Islands	2	20	20	0	Q
10	Patrick Liu	Canada	2	16	17	-1	Q
11	Antonio Leal	Venezuela	2	19	22	-3	Q
12	Leopoldo Alarcón	Chile	2	17	20	-3	Q
13	Augusto Servello	Argentina	2	18	22	-4	Q
14	Carlos Padua	Puerto Rico	2	16	20	-4	Q
15	Henrique Marques	Brazil	1	15	23	-8	Q
16	David Ospina	Colombia	1	12	23	-11	Q
17	Cesar Aguirre Barbera	Venezuela	0	11	25	-14	
18	Jorge Murillo Diaz	Colombia	0	5	25	-20	

=== Elimination round ===
Round of 16
1	Nick Itkin (USA)	15
16	David Ospina (COL)	3
9	Kruz Schembri (ISV)	9
8	Tommaso Archilei (MEX)	15
5	Gustavo Alarcón (CHI)	5
12	Leopoldo Alarcón (CHI)	15
13	Augusto Servello (ARG)	15
4	Nicolás Marino (ARG)	14
3	Miles Chamley-Watson (USA)	15
14	Carlos Padua (PUR)	11
11	Antonio Leal (VEN)	11
6	Blake Broszus (CAN)	15
7	Diego Cervantes (MEX)	15
10	Patrick Liu (CAN)	5
15	Henrique Marques (BRA)	12
2	Guilherme Toldo (BRA)	15

Quarterfinals
1	Nick Itkin (USA)	15
8	Tommaso Archilei (MEX)	7
12	Leopoldo Alarcón (CHI)	7
13	Augusto Servello (ARG)	15
3	Miles Chamley-Watson (USA)	15
6	Blake Broszus (CAN)	12
7	Diego Cervantes (MEX)	11
2	Guilherme Toldo (BRA)	15

Semifinals
1	Nick Itkin (USA)	15
13	Augusto Servello (ARG)	4
3	Miles Chamley-Watson (USA)	15
2	Guilherme Toldo (BRA)	9

Final
1	Nick Itkin (USA)	15
3	Miles Chamley-Watson (USA)	6
