= Fencing at the 2023 Pan American Games – Men's team foil =

Men's team foil at the 2023 Pan American Games
- Venue: Paralympic Training Center
- Dates: November 3
- Competitors: 24 from 8 nations

Medalists
Gold medal	Gerek Meinhardt; Nick Itkin; Miles Chamley-Watson	United States
Silver medal	Maximilien Van Haaster; Blake Broszus; Patrick Liu	Canada
Bronze medal	Pedro Marostega; Guilherme Toldo; Henrique Marques	Brazil

The men's team foil competition of the fencing events at the 2023 Pan American Games was held on November 3 at the Paralympic Training Center.

== Format ==
The team foil competition consisted of a three-round single-elimination bracket with a bronze medal match between the two semifinal losers and classification semifinals and finals for 5th to 8th places. Teams consist of three members each. Matches consist of nine bouts, with every fencer on one team facing each fencer on the other team. Scoring carried over between bouts with a total of 45 touches being the team goal. Bouts lasted until one team reached the target multiple of 5 touches. For example, if the first bout ended with a score of 5–3, that score would remain into the next bout and the second bout would last until one team reached 10 touches. Bouts also had a maximum time of three minutes each; if the final bout ended before either team reached 45 touches, the team leading at that point won. A tie at that point would result in an additional one-minute sudden-death time period. This sudden-death period was further modified by the selection of a draw-winner beforehand; if neither fencer scored a touch during the minute, the predetermined draw-winner won the bout.

== Schedule ==
Date	Time	Round
November 3, 2023	11:00	Quarterfinals
November 3, 2023	12:40	Semifinals
November 3, 2023	12:40	Fifth - Eight Place
November 3, 2023	14:20	Seventh - Eight Place
November 3, 2023	14:20	Fifth - Sixth Place
November 3, 2023	16:00	Finals

== Results ==
The results were as follows:

Quarterfinals
United States	45
Venezuela	21
Chile	45
Argentina	43
Brazil	45
Mexico	34
Colombia	13
Canada	45

Semifinals
United States	45
Chile	17
Brazil	41
Canada	45

Final
United States	45
Canada	19
Third place
Chile	36
Brazil	45

=== Classification 5 – 8 ===
Classification
Venezuela	39
Argentina	45
Colombia	35
Mexico	45

Fifth place
Argentina	45
Mexico	39
Seventh place
Venezuela	45
Colombia	40

== Final classification ==
Rank	Team	Athlete
1st place, gold medalist(s)	United States	Gerek Meinhardt; Nick Itkin; Miles Chamley-Watson
2nd place, silver medalist(s)	Canada	Maximilien Van Haaster; Blake Broszus; Patrick Liu
3rd place, bronze medalist(s)	Brazil	Pedro Marostega; Guilherme Toldo; Henrique Marques
4	Chile	Leopoldo Alarcón; Gustavo Alarcón; Juvenal Alarcón
5	Argentina	Nicolás Marino; Augusto Servello; Dante Cerquetti
6	Mexico	Diego Cervantes; Tommaso Archilei; Ulises Soto
7	Venezuela	Antonio Leal; Janderson Briceño; César Aguirre
8	Colombia	Miguel Grajales; Jorge Murillo; David Ospina
