= Fencing at the 2015 Pan American Games – Men's team foil =

Men's team foil at the 2015 Pan American Games
- Venue: Toronto Pan Am Sports Centre
- Dates: July 25
- Competitors: 24 from 8 nations

Medalists
Gold medal	Miles Chamley-Watson; Alexander Massialas; Gerek Meinhardt	United States
Silver medal	Ghislain Perrier; Fernando Scavasin; Guilherme Toldo	Brazil
Bronze medal	Raul Arizaga; Jesús Beltran; Daniel Gómez	Mexico

The men's team foil competition of the fencing events at the 2015 Pan American Games was held on July 25 at the Toronto Pan Am Sports Centre.

The team foil competition consisted of a three-round single-elimination bracket with a bronze medal match between the two semifinal losers and classification semifinals and finals for 5th to 8th places. Teams consist of three members each. Matches consist of nine bouts, with every fencer on one team facing each fencer on the other team. Scoring carried over between bouts with a total of 45 touches being the team goal. Bouts lasted until one team reached the target multiple of 5 touches. For example, if the first bout ended with a score of 5-3, that score would remain into the next bout and the second bout would last until one team reached 10 touches. Bouts also had a maximum time of three minutes each; if the final bout ended before either team reached 45 touches, the team leading at that point won. A tie at that point would result in an additional one-minute sudden-death time period. This sudden-death period was further modified by the selection of a draw-winner beforehand; if neither fencer scored a touch during the minute, the predetermined draw-winner won the bout.

== Schedule ==
All times are Eastern Daylight Time (UTC-4).

Date	Time	Round
July 25, 2015	12:10	Quarterfinals
July 25, 2015	13:25	Fifth to eighth
July 25, 2015	14:40	Semifinals
July 25, 2015	18:05	Bronze medal match
July 25, 2015	20:05	Final

== Results ==
The following are the results of the event.

Quarterfinals
1	United States	45
8	Chile	16
5	Colombia	21
4	Mexico	45
3	Canada	42
6	Venezuela	45
7	Puerto Rico	19
2	Brazil	45

Semifinals
1	United States	45
4	Mexico	18
6	Venezuela	34
2	Brazil	42

Final
1	United States	45
2	Brazil	26
Third place
4	Mexico	45
6	Venezuela	29

=== Classification 5 – 8 ===
Classification
8	Chile	35
5	Colombia	35+
3	Canada	45
7	Puerto Rico	21

Fifth place
5	Colombia	22
3	Canada	45
Seventh place
8	Chile	45
7	Puerto Rico	30

== Final classification ==
Rank	Team	Athlete
1st place, gold medalist(s)	United States	Miles Chamley-Watson; Alexander Massialas; Gerek Meinhardt
2nd place, silver medalist(s)	Brazil	Ghislain Perrier; Fernando Scavasin; Guilherme Toldo
3rd place, bronze medalist(s)	Mexico	Raul Arizaga; Jesús Beltran; Daniel Gómez
4	Venezuela	Cesar Aguirre; Antonio Leal; Victor Leon
5	Canada	Anthony Prymack; Eli Schenkel; Maximilien Van Haaster
6	Colombia	Dimitri Clairet; Alejandro Hernandez Vasquez; Santiago Pachon
7	Chile	Juvenal Alarcón; Felipe Alvear; Ruben Silva
8	Puerto Rico	Angelo Justiniano; Jonathan Lugo; Jabnyell Ortega Rexach
