= Fencing at the 2015 Pan American Games – Men's foil =

Men's foil at the 2015 Pan American Games
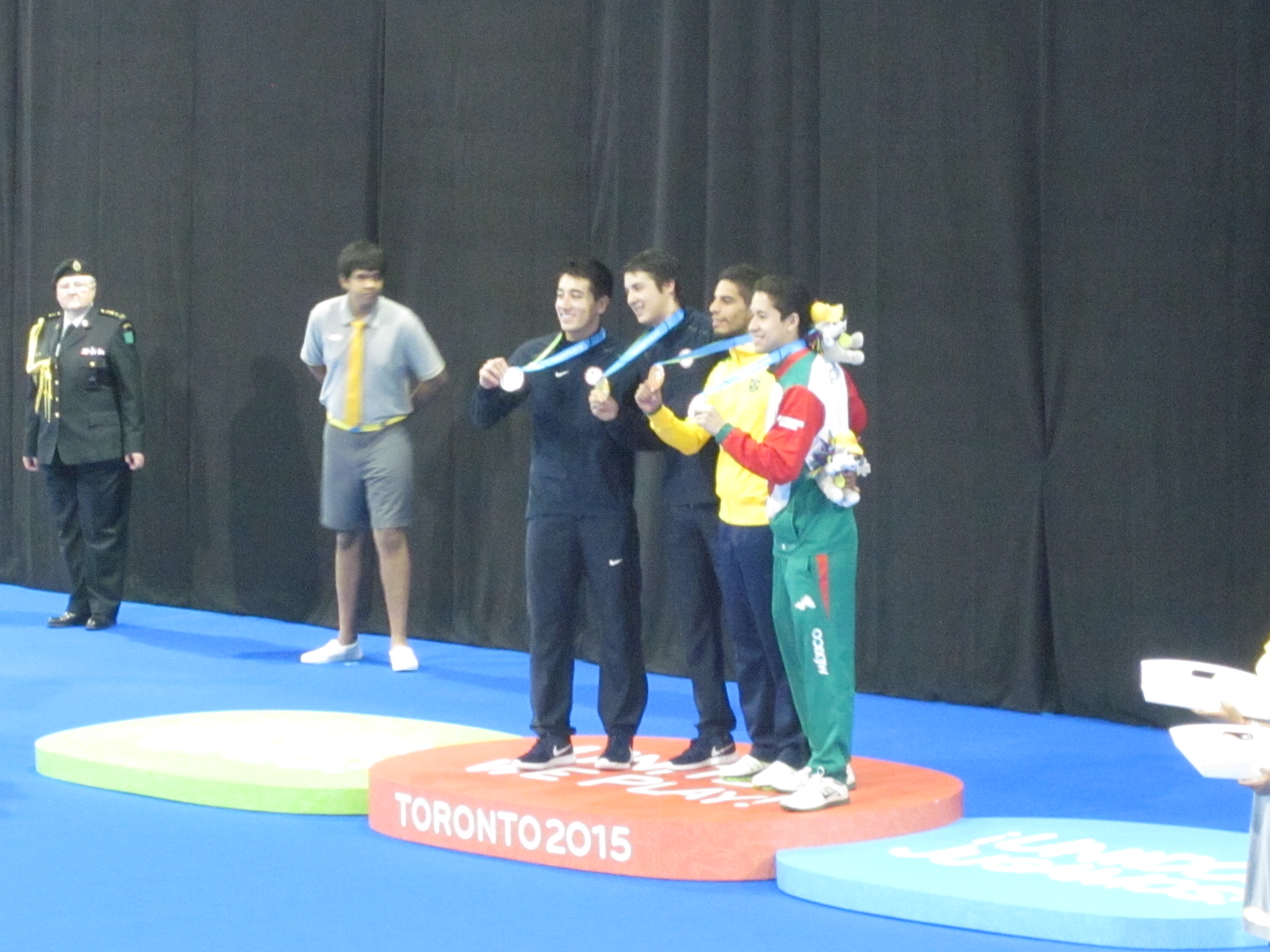
- 2015 Pan American Games Fencing Men's individual foil medalists
- Venue: Toronto Pan Am Sports Centre
- Dates: July 22
- Competitors: 18 from 10 nations

Medalists
Gold medal	Alexander Massialas	United States
Silver medal	Gerek Meinhardt	United States
Bronze medal	Daniel Gómez	Mexico
Bronze medal	Ghislain Perrier	Brazil

The men's foil competition of the fencing events at the 2015 Pan American Games was held on July 22 at the Toronto Pan Am Sports Centre.

The foil competition consisted of a qualification round followed by a single-elimination bracket with a bronze medal match between the two semifinal losers. Fencing was done to 15 touches or to the completion of three three-minute rounds if neither fencer reached 15 touches by then. At the end of time, the higher-scoring fencer was the winner; a tie resulted in an additional one-minute sudden-death time period. This sudden-death period was further modified by the selection of a draw-winner beforehand; if neither fencer scored a touch during the minute, the predetermined draw-winner won the bout.

== Schedule ==
All times are Eastern Daylight Time (UTC-4).

Date	Time	Round
July 22, 2015	12:30	Qualification pools
July 22, 2015	14:15	Round of 16
July 22, 2015	15:20	Quarterfinals
July 22, 2015	18:40	Semifinals
July 22, 2015	19:40	Final

== Results ==
The following are the results of the event.

=== Qualification ===
All 18 fencers were put into three groups of six athletes, were each fencer would have five individual matches. The top 16 athletes overall would qualify for next round.

Rank	Name	Nation	Victories	TG	TR	Dif.	Notes
1	Alexander Massialas	United States	5	25	12	+13	Q
2	Gerek Meinhardt	United States	5	25	13	+12	Q
3	Maximilien Van Haaster	Canada	4	22	12	+10	Q
4	Daniel Gómez	Mexico	4	23	14	+9	Q
5	Antonio Leal	Venezuela	4	22	13	+9	Q
6	Ghislain Perrier	Brazil	3	22	13	+9	Q
7	Anthony Prymack	Canada	3	19	13	+6	Q
8	Guilherme Toldo	Brazil	3	19	15	+4	Q
9	Jesus Riano	Cuba	3	18	19	-1	Q
10	Ruben Silva	Chile	2	15	18	-3	Q
11	Felipe Saucedo	Argentina	2	15	19	-4	Q
12	Cesar Aguirre	Venezuela	1	14	20	-6	Q
12	Felipe Alvear	Chile	1	14	20	-6	Q
14	Angelo Justiniano	Puerto Rico	1	14	23	-9	Q
15	Jonathan Lugo	Puerto Rico	1	12	21	-9	Q
16	Raul Arizaga	Mexico	1	14	24	-10	Q
17	Alejandro Hernandez Vasquez	Colombia	1	11	22	-11	
18	Dimitri Clairet	Colombia	1	9	22	-13	

=== Elimination round ===
Round of 16
1	Alexander Massialas (USA)	15
16	Raul Arizaga (MEX)	8
9	Jesus Riano (CUB)	8
8	Guilherme Toldo (BRA)	15
5	Antonio Leal (VEN)	6
12	Cesar Aguirre (VEN)	15
13	Felipe Alvear (CHI)	7
4	Daniel Gómez (MEX)	15
3	Maximilien Van Haaster (CAN)	15
14	Angelo Justiniano (PUR)	9
11	Felipe Saucedo (ARG)	8
6	Ghislain Perrier (BRA)	15
7	Anthony Prymack (CAN)	12
10	Ruben Silva (CHI)	15
15	Jonathan Lugo (PUR)	8
2	Gerek Meinhardt (USA)	15

Quarterfinals
1	Alexander Massialas (USA)	15
8	Guilherme Toldo (BRA)	7
12	Cesar Aguirre (VEN)	6
4	Daniel Gómez (MEX)	15
3	Maximilien Van Haaster (CAN)	13
6	Ghislain Perrier (BRA)	15
10	Ruben Silva (CHI)	6
2	Gerek Meinhardt (USA)	15

Semifinals
1	Alexander Massialas (USA)	15
4	Daniel Gómez (MEX)	2
6	Ghislain Perrier (BRA)	12
2	Gerek Meinhardt (USA)	15

Final
1	Alexander Massialas (USA)	15
2	Gerek Meinhardt (USA)	12
