= Nick Itkin =

American Olympic foil fencer

Personal information
- Full name: Nicholas Boris Itkin
- Born: October 9, 1999 (age 27) Los Angeles, California, U.S.
- Height: 6 ft 2 in (188 cm)
- Weight: 157 lb (71 kg)

Fencing career
- Sport: Fencing
- Country: United States
- Weapon: Foil
- Hand: right-handed
- Club: Los Angeles International Fencing Center
- Head coach: Michael Itkin
- FIE ranking: current ranking
Medal record
Men's foil
Representing the United States
Olympic Games
Bronze medal – third place	2020 Tokyo	Team
Bronze medal – third place	2024 Paris	Individual
World Championships
Silver medal – second place	2022 Cairo	Team
Silver medal – second place	2023 Milan	Individual
Silver medal – second place	2025 Tbilisi	Team
Bronze medal – third place	2022 Cairo	Individual
Bronze medal – third place	2026 Hong Kong	Team
Pan American Games
Gold medal – first place	2019 Lima	Team
Gold medal – first place	2023 Santiago	Individual
Gold medal – first place	2023 Santiago	Team
Pan American Championships
Gold medal – first place	2019 Toronto	Team
Gold medal – first place	2022 Asunción	Team
Gold medal – first place	2023 Lima	Team
Gold medal – first place	2024 Lima	Individual
Gold medal – first place	2024 Lima	Team
Gold medal – first place	2025 Rio de Janeiro	Team
Gold medal – first place	2026 Lima	Team
Silver medal – second place	2023 Lima	Individual
Silver medal – second place	2025 Rio de Janeiro	Individual
Bronze medal – third place	2022 Asunción	Individual

Nicholas Boris Itkin (/ˈɪtkɪn/ IT-kin; born October 9, 1999) is an American foil fencer. He is a two-time Olympic bronze medalist, two-time World Championship individual medalist, 2019 Pan American Games team gold medalist, 2023 Pan American Games individual gold medalist, six-time Division 1 National Champion, and two-time NCAA individual champion.

He earned the foil individual silver medal at the 2023 World Fencing Championships, to become the first U.S. man, and third U.S. fencer overall, to win individual medals at back-to-back World Fencing Championships. Itkin competed in his second Olympic Games representing the United States at the 2024 Paris Olympics, winning a bronze medal in the individual foil competition.

== Early life ==
Itkin was born in Los Angeles, California, and is Jewish. His parents are Michael ("Misha"; a fencing coach) and Tatiana (a former rhythmic gymnast, and current coach). His father emigrated from Ukraine to the United States, and opened up a fencing club in Los Angeles. His older sister Julia competed in rhythmic gymnastics for the US national team. He attended Palisades Charter High School, graduating in 2017.

== Fencing career ==
=== 2015–19: Junior World Champion ===
Itkin trains under his father at Los Angeles International Fencing Center, which his father founded in 2003. In 2015, he was a Cadet Junior Olympics bronze medalist, and in 2016 he was a Cadet Pan American Championships gold medalist. In 2017 he was a Junior Pan American Championships silver medalist.

At the 2018 Junior World Fencing Championships in Verona, Italy, Itkin won the gold medal in foil. He defeated future world champion Tommaso Marini of Italy in the final. He also won a team bronze medal at the championships. When he then also won consecutive NCAA fencing championships in foil, in 2018 and 2019 as he fenced for the University of Notre Dame where he studied political science, he decided to pursue fencing at the senior level. In 2018 he became the first American fencer to win gold medals at all three of the NCAA Fencing Championships, the US National Fencing championships, and the Junior World Fencing Championship in the same year. In 2019 he also won a team gold medal at the 2019 Pan American Fencing Championships in Toronto, Canada.

=== 2020–23: First Olympics team medal and back-to-back World Championship medals ===
Itkin won the gold medal at a 2020 World Cup in Paris, becoming the youngest top-10 foil fencer in the world. Among other victories, in the competition he defeated the reigning world champion and world No. 3 Enzo Lefort of France, and the reigning Olympic champion Daniele Garozzo of Italy.

In 2021, Itkin won the U.S. National Championship in foil, in Philadelphia.

At the 2020 Summer Olympics in Tokyo, at 21 years of age, Itkin won a bronze medal with Team USA in the men's team foil competition. He came in 12th in the individual men's foil competition at the Olympics. At the 2022 Pan American Fencing Championships in Asunción, Paraguay, he won a team gold medal, and an individual bronze medal.

Itkin won an individual bronze medal in men's foil at the 2022 World Fencing Championships in Cairo, Egypt. In the competition, he defeated world No. 6 Takahiro Shikine of Japan and former world champion and world No. 3 Alessio Foconi of Italy, before losing to Enzo Lefort of France by a score of 15–14 in the semifinals. Lefort won the final to become a two-time reigning world champion.

In 2023, Itkin won the U.S. National Championship in foil for the fifth time, having won five of the six national championships contested between 2017 and 2023. With the 2023 championship, Itkin moved into fourth place on the all-time list of men's foil fencers with the most U.S. national indoor titles.

Despite not winning an individual medal at any of the Grand Prix or World Cup events during the 2023 season, Itkin improved on his 2022 World Championships performance by winning the silver medal in Individual Men's Foil at the 2023 World Fencing Championships. In a 2024 interview, Itkin discussed his tendency to perform better under pressure: "I just love that atmosphere, where the crowd is yelling and everyone's cheering, because when it's not like that, I have to kind of yell and force myself to get that kind of energy and atmosphere coming, but when it's already there naturally it's just so much easier for me." This medal was Itkin's third Senior Worlds medal in the past two years: individual bronze and team silver in 2022 and now individual silver in 2023. He became the first U.S. man, and third U.S. fencer overall, to win individual medals at back-to-back World Fencing Championships.

=== 2024–present: World No. 1 and Olympic individual bronze medal ===
At the Foil Grand Prix held in Washington, D.C. in 2024, Itkin secured the gold medal in front of a home crowd. En route to his victory, Itkin defeated two-time Olympic individual medalist Daniele Garozzo of Italy by a score of 15-9 and fellow Italian and world No. 9 Filippo Macchi 15–6 before defeating Enzo Lefort of France 15–12 in the gold medal match, which was his closest bout of the tournament. In a dominant performance, Itkin outscored his opponents in D.C. by a combined count of 90–47. With this victory, Itkin became the top-ranked men's foil fencer in the world for the 2024 season.

Itkin competed in his second Olympic Games representing the United States at the 2024 Paris Olympics. He won a bronze medal in the individual foil competition, defeating Japanese fencer and World No. 9 Kazuki Iimura in the bronze medal match to become just the fifth ever American foil fencer to bring home an individual Olympic medal. Fencing with Team USA in the team foil event, he and the team came in fourth.

== Medal record ==
=== Olympic Games ===
Year	Location	Event	Position
2021	Tokyo, Japan	Team Men's Foil	3rd
2024	Paris, France	Individual Men's Foil	3rd

=== World Championship ===
Year	Location	Event	Position
2022	Cairo, Egypt	Individual Men's Foil	3rd
2022	Cairo, Egypt	Team Men's Foil	2nd
2023	Milan, Italy	Individual Men's Foil	2nd
2025	(Georgia (country)) Tbilisi, Georgia	Team Men's Foil	2nd

=== Grand Prix ===
Date	Location	Event	Position
2019-05-17	Shanghai, China	Individual Men's Foil	2nd
2024-02-10	Turin, Italy	Individual Men's Foil	3rd
2024-03-17	Washington, D.C., United States	Individual Men's Foil	1st
2025-03-22	Lima, Peru	Individual Men's Foil	3rd
2026-02-06	Turin, Italy	Individual Men's Foil	2nd

=== World Cup ===
Date	Location	Event	Position
2018-11-09	Bonn, Germany	Individual Men's Foil	3rd
2020-01-10	Paris, France	Individual Men's Foil	1st
2023-05-07	Acapulco, Mexico	Team Men's Foil	1st
2024-11-24	Tunis, Tunisia	Team Men's Foil	2nd
2024-12-08	Takasaki, Japan	Team Men's Foil	2nd
2025-01-12	Paris, France	Team Men's Foil	3rd
2025-03-09	Cairo, Egypt	Team Men's Foil	2nd
2025-05-04	Vancouver, Canada	Team Men's Foil	1st
2026-01-11	Paris, France	Team Men's Foil	2nd
2026-04-16	Cairo, Egypt	Individual Men's Foil	3rd
2026-04-19	Cairo, Egypt	Team Men's Foil	3rd

=== Pan American Championship ===
Year	Location	Event	Position
2019	Toronto, Canada	Team Men's Foil	1st
2022	Asunción, Paraguay	Individual Men's Foil	3rd
2022	Asunción, Paraguay	Team Men's Foil	1st
2023	Lima, Peru	Individual Men's Foil	2nd
2023	Lima, Peru	Team Men's Foil	1st
2024	Lima, Peru	Individual Men's Foil	1st
2024	Lima, Peru	Team Men's Foil	1st
2025	Rio de Janeiro, Brazil	Individual Men's Foil	2nd
2025	Rio de Janeiro, Brazil	Team Men's Foil	1st
2026	Lima, Peru	Team Men's Foil	1st

== See also ==
- List of select Jewish fencers
- List of Jewish Olympic medalists
- List of NCAA fencing champions
- List of USFA Division I National Champions
