= Miles Chamley-Watson =

British-American fencer

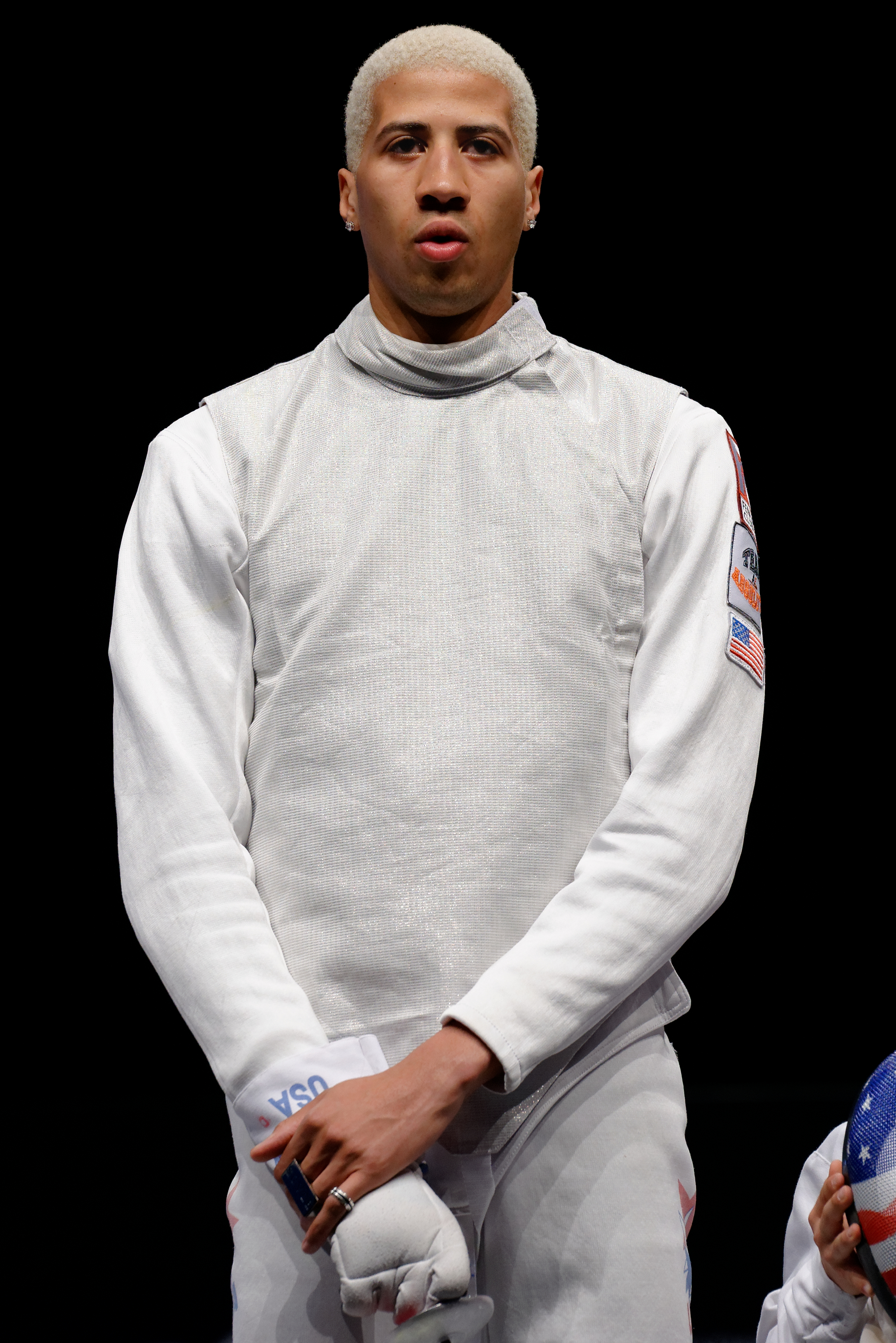
- Chamley-Watson in 2014

Personal information
- Full name: Miles Cleveland Chamley-Watson
- Born: December 3, 1989 (age 36) London, England
- Height: 6 ft 5 in (196 cm)
- Weight: 205 lb (93 kg)

Fencing career
- Sport: Fencing
- Country: United States
- Weapon: Foil
- Hand: Right-handed
- Club: Los Angeles International Fencing Center
- Head coach: Michael Itkin
- FIE ranking: current ranking
Medal record
Men's foil
Representing the United States
Olympic Games
Bronze medal – third place	2016 Rio de Janeiro	Team
World Championships
Gold medal – first place	2013 Budapest	Individual
Gold medal – first place	2019 Budapest	Team
Silver medal – second place	2013 Budapest	Team
Silver medal – second place	2017 Leipzig	Team
Silver medal – second place	2018 Wuxi	Team
Pan American Games
Gold medal – first place	2011 Guadalajara	Team
Gold medal – first place	2015 Toronto	Team
Gold medal – first place	2023 Santiago	Team
Silver medal – second place	2023 Santiago	Individual
Pan American Championships
Gold medal – first place	2008 Querétaro	Team
Gold medal – first place	2009 San Salvador	Team
Gold medal – first place	2010 San José	Team
Gold medal – first place	2011 Reno	Team
Gold medal – first place	2012 Cancún	Team
Gold medal – first place	2013 Cartagena	Team
Gold medal – first place	2014 San José	Team
Gold medal – first place	2015 Santiago	Team
Gold medal – first place	2017 Montreal	Team
Gold medal – first place	2018 Havana	Team
Gold medal – first place	2019 Toronto	Team
Gold medal – first place	2023 Lima	Team
Gold medal – first place	2024 Lima	Team
Silver medal – second place	2010 San José	Individual
Bronze medal – third place	2009 San Salvador	Individual
Bronze medal – third place	2013 Cartagena	Individual
Bronze medal – third place	2016 Panama City	Individual
Bronze medal – third place	2017 Montreal	Individual

Miles Cleveland Chamley-Watson (born December 3, 1989) is a British-American right-handed foil fencer. He is a 13-time team Pan American champion, the 2019 team world champion, the 2013 individual world champion, a three-time Olympian, and the 2016 team Olympic bronze medalist. Apart from that, he is also the founder of World Fencing League.

== Early life ==
Chamley-Watson was born on December 3, 1989, in North London, England, to an Anglo-African mother and an Anglo-Jamaican father. He lived in London for the first 10 years of his life before moving to the United States with his mother and stepfather, settling in New York City, while his biological father remained in the United Kingdom. After being expelled from several schools as a child due to behavioral problems related to his ADHD, his parents enrolled him in the Quest program at the Dwight School in Manhattan, designed to help students with learning differences. As part of the program, Chamley-Watson was required to participate in a sport and was given three options: tennis, badminton, or fencing. It was there that he began fencing, encouraged by one of his teachers, Ellen Grayson, whose husband, Eric, coached the fencing program. His teachers believed the sport would help him focus and serve as a good outlet for managing his hyperactivity.

After 9/11, when Chamley-Watson was 12, his stepfather decided to move their family to Philadelphia, Pennsylvania. He did not return to New York City until he was 21.

== College career ==
Chamley-Watson earned a degree in sports management from Pennsylvania State University in 2012.

=== Freshman year (2008–2009) ===
Chamley-Watson maintained a 19–4 record during his first year as an NCAA fencer. He was defeated in the semifinals 15–14 by Nicholas Chinman. The Penn State fencing team were the 2008–2009 National Team Champions.

=== Sophomore year (2009–2010) ===
Chamley-Watson was defeated in the semifinals by Gerek Meinhardt of Notre Dame.

=== Junior year (2010–2011) ===
During his junior season, Chamley-Watson had the choice to either redshirt his junior or senior season. He decided to compete in the NCAA Championships his junior year and redshirt during his senior season. He finished in second place in the championship tournament.

=== Senior year (2011–2012) ===
Chamley-Watson was a redshirt during his senior season. He earned a spot on the 2012 United States Olympic Fencing team as a foil fencer.

== International career ==
Chamley-Watson entered the 2012 Summer Olympics as the No. 2 ranked foil fencer. His first round in the games he was presented a bye into the next round. In the second round, Chamley-Watson fenced Alaaeldin Abouelkassem, an opponent representing the country of Egypt, and was defeated 15 – 10. Abouelkassem went on to earn the silver medal in the event. In the team event, the United States beat France 45–39 in the quarterfinals, but lost 24–45 to Italy in the semi-final. In the bronze medal fight, the United States lost 27–45 to Germany.

At the 2013 World Championships, Chamley-Watson became the first male US fencer to win an individual gold medal at the World Championships.

At the 2016 Olympics, Chamley-Watson again lost in the second round, this time to Russia's Artur Akhmatkhuzin, 13–15. In the team event, the United States beat Egypt 45–27 in the quarterfinals, before losing 41–45 to Russia in the semi-finals. In the bronze medal match, the United States beat Italy 45–31.

At the 2024 Olympics, Chamley-Watson competed as the fourth member of the American team, only competing in the team event and not the individual event. In the team event, the United States beat Egypt 45–35 in the quarterfinals, but lost 38–45 to Italy in the semi-finals. In the bronze medal match, the United States lost 32–45 to France.

== Signature move ==
During a match in his World Championships debut, Chamley-Watson wrapped his arm around the back of his head and struck his opponent in the chest with his foil. It was the first time a fencer had ever used this kind of behind-the-back flick in a competition. Unsure of its legality, the referee stopped the match to check the move on video replay. After it was determined to be legitimate, Chamley-Watson was awarded his own signature fencing move, eponymously named 'the Chamley-Watson'.

== Medal record ==
=== Olympic Games ===
Year	Location	Event	Position
2016	Rio de Janeiro, Brazil	Team Men's Foil	3rd

=== World Championship ===
Year	Location	Event	Position
2013	Budapest, Hungary	Individual Men's Foil	1st
2013	Budapest, Hungary	Team Men's Foil	2nd
2017	Leipzig, Germany	Team Men's Foil	2nd
2018	Wuxi, China	Team Men's Foil	2nd
2019	Budapest, Hungary	Team Men's Foil	1st

=== Grand Prix ===
Date	Location	Event	Position
05/24/2010	St. Petersburg, Russia	Individual Men's Foil	3rd
05/15/2015	Shanghai, China	Individual Men's Foil	1st

=== World Cup ===
Date	Location	Event	Position
06/12/2009	Estado Vargas, Venezuela	Individual Men's Foil	3rd
06/11/2010	Margarita Island, Venezuela	Individual Men's Foil	2nd
02/05/2016	Bonn, Germany	Individual Men's Foil	2nd
11/11/2016	Tokyo, Japan	Individual Men's Foil	1st
09/03/2025	Cairo, Egypt	Team Men's Foil	2nd

=== Pan American Championship ===
Year	Location	Event	Position
2008	Querétaro City, Mexico	Team Men's Foil	1st
2009	San Salvador, El Salvador	Individual Men's Foil	3rd
2009	San Salvador, El Salvador	Team Men's Foil	1st
2010	San José, Costa Rica	Individual Men's Foil	2nd
2010	San José, Costa Rica	Team Men's Foil	1st
2011	(United States) Reno, Nevada	Team Men's Foil	1st
2012	Cancún, Mexico	Team Men's Foil	1st
2013	Cartagena, Colombia	Individual Men's Foil	3rd
2013	Cartagena, Colombia	Team Men's Foil	1st
2014	San José, Costa Rica	Team Men's Foil	1st
2015	Santiago, Chile	Team Men's Foil	1st
2016	Panama City, Panama	Individual Men's Foil	3rd
2017	Montreal, Canada	Individual Men's Foil	3rd
2017	Montreal, Canada	Team Men's Foil	1st
2018	Havana, Cuba	Team Men's Foil	1st
2019	Toronto, Canada	Team Men's Foil	1st
2023	Lima, Peru	Team Men's Foil	1st
2024	Lima, Peru	Team Men's Foil	1st

== Modeling ==
Growing up, Chamley-Watson was engaged in the fashion world by his mother, Elizabeth Chamley who was formerly a model in the UK. In addition to his interest in fashion, Chamley-Watson was motivated to begin modeling as a way to give the sport of fencing more exposure.

When Chamley-Watson was 17-years-old, he was scouted by Ford Models while walking on the street in New York City. However, he told the agency that he was going to college soon and couldn't sign with them. A few years later, when Chamley-Watson redshirted his senior year of college to prepare for the Olympics, he took the opportunity to also begin modeling on the side. From there, Chamley-Watson's modeling career grew.

In 2017, Chamley-Watson signed with IMG Models, and is still currently represented by them.

== Sponsorships and partnerships ==
Chamley-Watson is currently sponsored by Red Bull, Nike, Richard Mille, and Cash App. He wears his sponsors’ logos on his fencing equipment—on his mask, glove, and jacket. Additionally, he regularly wears a Richard Mille watch and Nike fencing shoes and socks at competitions, as well as a Red Bull cap in between matches and on podiums.

Chamley-Watson is also sponsored by Absolute Fencing Gear, who supply all of the fencing equipment for his training and competitions.

As the most followed fencer in the world, Chamley-Watson frequently uses his social media to post about his sponsorships, and to also post about new and recurring partnerships. He is currently partnered with Mercedes-Benz, Dior, Michael Kors, Dita Eyewear, and DKNY.

== Personal life ==
Chamley-Watson is of Jamaican, Irish, British, and Malawian descent.

== See also ==
- List of Pennsylvania State University Olympians
- List of USFA Division I National Champions
