= Men's foil at the 2010 World Fencing Championships =

The Men's foil event took place on November 7, 2010 at Grand Palais.

== Foil individual ==
Position	Name	Country
1.	Peter Joppich	Germany
2.	Lei Sheng	China
3.	Gerek Meinhardt	United States
3.	Yuki Ota	Japan
5.	Miles Chamley-Watson	United States
6.	Victor Sintès	France
7.	Rostyslav Hertsyk	Ukraine
8.	Maor Hatoel	Israel

Quarter-finals
(China) Lei Sheng	15
(United States) Miles Chamley-Watson	10
(Japan) Yuki Ota	15
(Ukraine) Rostyslav Hertsyk	5
(United States) Gerek Meinhardt	15
(Israel) Maor Hatoel	10
(Germany) Peter Joppich	15
(France) Victor Sintès	4

Semi-finals
(China) Lei Sheng	15
(Japan) Yuki Ota	14
(United States) Gerek Meinhardt	12
(Germany) Peter Joppich	15

Final
(China) Lei Sheng	11
(Germany) Peter Joppich	15
