= FanCode =

Indian sports streaming service

- Website type: Sports broadcasting; OTT platform
- Founded: 2019; 7 years ago
- Headquarters: Mumbai, Maharashtra, India
- Area served: South Asia
- Owner: Dream Sports
- Founders: Yannick Colaco; Prasana Krishnan
- Industry: Streaming; Entertainment; E-commerce; Mass Media
- Products: Streaming media; Video on demand; Digital distribution; Sports e-commerce
- Services: On-demand video streaming
- Website: www.fancode.com
- Commercial: Yes
- Registration: Optional
- Current status: 2019 - Active

FanCode is an Indian over-the-top sports streaming platform and e-commerce company. It was founded in 2019 by Yannick Colaco and Prasana Krishnan. It is part of the Dream Sports group. It offers interactive live streaming, sports fan merchandise, fantasy sports statistics and analytics, interactive live match scores, live commentary, expert opinions and news to its users on its website and application. In May 2024, FanCode crossed 100 million user base.

== History ==
The company was founded in 2019 by Yannick Colaco and Prasana Krishnan. Colaco previously worked with NBA India as managing director, while Krishnan was a former executive at sports pay-television broadcasters Sony Pictures Networks and Neo Sports.

In May 2021, Fancode raised $50 million from its parent firm Digital sports' investment arm Dream Sports Investments (DSI). It has three D2C lines that are Fancode live (Sports broadcasting), Fancode Stats (Sports insights).

FanCode acquired streaming rights for the American football league, National Football League in January 2020. It also received streaming rights of the season of I-League in India from Lex Sportel Vision in January 2019. It also had exclusive streaming rights in India of Bundesliga.

== Notable programming ==
=== Football ===
- Indian Super League (ISL)
- English Football League (EFL)
  - EFL Championship
  - EFL One
  - EFL Two
  - Carabao Cup
- Women's Super League (WSL)
- Scottish Cup
- CONCACAF
  - CONCACAF W Gold Cup
  - CONCACAF Champions Cup
- Copa América
- La Liga
- RFEF
  - Copa del Rey
  - Supercopa de España
- DFB-Pokal
- A-League Men
- Saudi Pro League
- Saudi King's Cup
- Saudi Super Cup
- 2023 SAFF Championship
- UEFA Women's Euro 2025
- UEFA Women's Champions League
- 2023 FIFA Women's World Cup
- AFC (until 2028)
  - AFC Asian Cup
  - AFC U-23 Asian Cup
  - AFC U-20 Asian Cup
  - AFC U-17 Asian Cup
  - AFC Champions League Elite
  - AFC Champions League Two
  - AFC Challenge League
  - AFC Women's Asian Cup
  - AFC Women's Olympic Qualifying Tournament (final round only)
  - AFC U-20 Women's Asian Cup
  - AFC U-17 Women's Asian Cup
  - AFC Women's Champions League
- Africa Cup of Nations
- FIFA World Cup qualification (AFC (selected matches in second round, all matches from third until fifth round), CAF (all matches), and CONMEBOL)

=== Cricket ===
- English Cricket
  - Vitality Blast
  - Vitality Blast Women's
  - Rotheasy county Championship
  - Metro Bank One Day Cup
  - Metro Bank One Day Cup Women's
- Nepal Premier League
- T10 League
- Afghanistan tour of Bangladesh, 2023
- 2023 Cricket World Cup Qualifier
- India Tour of West Indies
- Afghanistan tour of Sri Lanka
- West Indian tour of UAE
- Tamil Nadu Premier League
- West Indies cricket
- New Zealand cricket (domestic)
- Malaysian Cricket
- Bangladesh Premier League
- 2024 Pakistan Super League
- Maharashtra Premier League

=== Padel ===
- Hexagon Cup

=== Fencing ===
- World Fencing League

=== Racing ===
- FOM
  - Formula 1
  - Formula 2
  - Formula 3
  - Porsche Super Cup

=== Tennis ===
- Roland Garros
