= Fencing at the 2019 Pan American Games =

- Fencing pictogram
- Venue: Lima Convention Centre
- Dates: August 5–10, 2019
- Competitors: 156 from 15 nations

Fencing competitions at the 2019 Pan American Games in Lima, Peru are scheduled to be held between August 5 and 10, 2019 at the Lima Convention Centre.

12 medal events are scheduled to be contested, in the three disciplines of épée, foil and sabre. In each discipline an individual and team event will be held for each gender. A total of 156 fencers will qualify to compete at the games.

== Medal table ==
Rank	Nation	Gold	Silver	Bronze	Total
1	United States	10	0	1	11
2	Venezuela	1	2	3	6
3	Cuba	1	1	2	4
4	Canada	0	3	6	9
5	Argentina	0	3	1	4
6	Brazil	0	1	2	3
7	Chile	0	1	0	1
7	Dominican Republic	0	1	0	1
9	Colombia	0	0	2	2
10	Mexico	0	0	1	1
Totals (10 entries)		12	12	18	42

== Medalists ==
=== Men's events ===
Event	Gold	Silver	Bronze
Individual épée	Rubén Limardo; Venezuela	Jesús Limardo; Venezuela	Jhon Édison Rodríguez; Colombia
Individual épée	Rubén Limardo; Venezuela	Jesús Limardo; Venezuela	Yunior Reytor; Cuba
Team épée	Cuba; Reynier Henrique; Humberto Aguilera; Yunior Reytor; Luis Enrique Patterson	Argentina; Santiago Lucchetti; Alessandro Taccani; José Félix Domínguez; Jesús Lugones	Venezuela; Jesús Limardo; Grabiel Lugo; Francisco Limardo; Rubén Limardo
Individual foil	Gerek Meinhardt; United States	Gustavo Alarcón; Chile	Maximilien van Haaster; Canada
Individual foil	Gerek Meinhardt; United States	Gustavo Alarcón; Chile	Race Imboden; United States
Team foil	United States; Race Imboden; Nick Itkin; Gerek Meinhardt	Brazil; Henrique Marques; Heitor Shimbo; Guilherme Toldo; Alexandre Camargo	Canada; Mikhail Sweet; Seraphim Hsieh Jarov; Maximilien van Haaster; Eli Schenkel
Individual sabre	Daryl Homer; United States	Pascual Di Tella; Argentina	Harold Rodríguez; Cuba
Individual sabre	Daryl Homer; United States	Pascual Di Tella; Argentina	Shaul Gordon; Canada
Team sabre	United States; Jeffrey Spear; Eli Dershwitz; Daryl Homer	Canada; Eli Schenkel; Shaul Gordon; Fares Arfa; Joseph Polossifakis	Colombia; Luis Enrique Correa; Sebastián Cuéllar; Pablo Trochez

=== Women's events ===
Event	Gold	Silver	Bronze
Individual épée	Katharine Holmes; United States	Patrizia Piovesan; Venezuela	Isabel Di Tella; Argentina
Individual épée	Katharine Holmes; United States	Patrizia Piovesan; Venezuela	Nathalie Moellhausen; Brazil
Team épée	United States; Isis Washington; Catherine Nixon; Katharine Holmes	Cuba; Aymara Tablada; Yamirka Rodríguez; Seily Mendoza; Diamelys González	Venezuela; Patrizia Piovesan; María Gabriela Martínez; Lizze Asis
Individual foil	Lee Kiefer; United States	Jessica Guo; Canada	Eleanor Harvey; Canada
Individual foil	Lee Kiefer; United States	Jessica Guo; Canada	Bia Bulcão; Brazil
Team foil	United States; Nicole Ross; Lee Kiefer; Jacqueline Dubrovich	Canada; Alanna Goldie; Gabriella Page; Jessica Guo; Eleanor Harvey	Mexico; Denisse Hernández; Melissa Rebolledo; Nataly Michel
Individual sabre	Anne-Elizabeth Stone; United States	María Belén Pérez Maurice; Argentina	Alejandra Benítez; Venezuela
Individual sabre	Anne-Elizabeth Stone; United States	María Belén Pérez Maurice; Argentina	Gabriella Page; Canada
Team sabre	United States; Monica Aksamit; Chloe Fox-Gitomer; Anne-Elizabeth Stone	Dominican Republic; Heyddys Valentín; Rossy Félix; Violeta Ramírez; Melody Martínez	Canada; Marissa Ponich; Pamela Brind'Amour; Gabriella Page; Eleanor Harvey

== Participating nations ==
A total of 15 countries qualified athletes. The number of athletes a nation entered is in parentheses beside the name of the country.

- Argentina (18)
- Brazil (15)
- Canada (18)
- Chile (3)
- Colombia (13)
- Costa Rica (1)
- Cuba (14)
- Dominican Republic (4)
- El Salvador (1)
- Mexico (16)
- Panama (1)
- Peru (18)
- Puerto Rico (3)
- United States (18)
- Venezuela (13)

== Qualification ==
A total of 156 fencers will qualify to compete. Each nation may enter a maximum of 18 athletes (nine per gender). The top seven teams at the 2018 Pan American Championships, along with the top two individuals not qualified through the team event will qualify for each respective discipline per gender. The host nation, Peru, automatically qualifies the maximum number of fencers (18). A maximum of two athletes from one NOC can enter the individual events.

== See also ==
- Fencing at the 2020 Summer Olympics
