= Gustavo Alarcón =

Chilean fencer (born 1999)

Personal information
- Born: 4 February 1999 (age 27)
- Height: 172 cm (5 ft 8 in)

Fencing career
- Sport: Fencing
- Country: Chile
- Weapon: Foil
- Hand: Right-handed
Medal record
Men's fencing
Representing Chile
Pan American Games
Silver medal – second place	2019 Lima	Foil

Gustavo Alarcón (born 4 February 1999) is a Chilean foil fencer. He won the silver medal in the men's foil event at the 2019 Pan American Games held in Lima, Peru. In the final, he lost against Gerek Meinhardt of the United States.

In 2018, he competed in the men's foil event at the Pan American Fencing Championships held in Havana, Cuba without winning a medal. He was eliminated in quarter finals by Maximilien van Haaster of Canada.
