= Men's team foil at the 2022 World Fencing Championships =

- Venue: Cairo Stadium Indoor Halls Complex
- Location: Cairo, Egypt
- Dates: 22–23 July
- Teams: 33

Medalists
gold medal	Guillaume Bianchi; Alessio Foconi; Daniele Garozzo; Tommaso Marini	Italy
silver medal	Chase Emmer; Nick Itkin; Alexander Massialas; Gerek Meinhardt	United States
bronze medal	Maximilien Chastanet; Enzo Lefort; Pierre Loisel; Alexandre Sido	France

The Men's team foil competition at the 2022 World Fencing Championships was held on 22 and 23 July 2022.

== Draw ==
=== Finals ===
Semifinals
Italy	45
Japan	33
United States	45
France	44

Final
Italy	45
United States	39
Third place
Japan	30
France	45

=== Top half ===
==== Section 1 ====
Round of 64
Uzbekistan	45
Iraq	22

Round of 32
Italy	45
Uzbekistan	31
Brazil	45
Netherlands	40
South Korea	45
Chile	31
Chinese Taipei	32
Poland	45

Round of 16
Italy	45
Brazil	17
South Korea	45
Poland	42

Quarterfinals
Italy	45
South Korea	30

==== Section 2 ====
Round of 32
Egypt	45
Australia	26
Singapore	37
Ukraine	45
Great Britain	44
Georgia	43
Kuwait	14
Japan	45

Round of 16
Egypt	45
Ukraine	25
Great Britain	22
Japan	45

Quarterfinals
Egypt	31
Japan	45

=== Bottom half ===
==== Section 3 ====
Round of 32
United States	45
India	13
Czech Republic	24
Hungary	45
Spain	39
Austria	45
China	40
Hong Kong	45

Round of 16
United States	45
Hungary	27
Austria	34
Hong Kong	45

Quarterfinals
United States	45
Hong Kong	35

==== Section 4 ====
Round of 32
Germany	45
Mexico	18
Israel	35
Canada	45
Argentina	26
Belgium	45
United Arab Emirates	14
France	45

Round of 16
Germany	38
Canada	45
Belgium	30
France	45

Quarterfinals
Canada	24
France	45

=== Placement rounds ===
==== 5–8th place bracket ====
5–8th place semifinals
South Korea	45
Egypt	42
Hong Kong	45
Canada	29

Fifth place
South Korea	32
Hong Kong	45
Seventh place
Egypt	43
Canada	45

==== 9–16th place bracket ====
9–16th place quarterfinals
Brazil	40
Poland	45
Ukraine	44
Great Britain	40
Hungary	39
Austria	45
Germany	37
Belgium	45

9–12th place semifinals
Poland	44
Ukraine	29
Austria	26
Belgium	45

Ninth place
Poland	45
Belgium	26
Eleventh place
Ukraine	45
Austria	32

==== 13–16th place bracket ====
13–16th place semifinals
Brazil	41
Great Britain	45
Hungary	45
Germany	40

13th place
Great Britain	45
Hungary	39
15th place
Brazil	43
Germany	45

== Final ranking ==
Rank	Team
1st place, gold medalist(s)	Italy
2nd place, silver medalist(s)	United States
3rd place, bronze medalist(s)	France
4	Japan
5	Hong Kong
6	South Korea
7	Canada
8	Egypt
9	Poland
10	Belgium
11	Ukraine
12	Austria
13	Great Britain
14	Hungary
15	Germany
16	Brazil
17	Spain
18	Argentina
19	Netherlands
20	Czech Republic
21	Georgia
22	Singapore
23	Israel
24	Chile
25	Chinese Taipei
26	Mexico
27	China
28	Australia
29	Kuwait
30	India
31	United Arab Emirates
32	Uzbekistan
33	Iraq
