= Men's team foil at the 2019 World Fencing Championships =

World Fencing Championships

- Venue: SYMA Sports and Conference Centre
- Location: Budapest, Hungary
- Dates: 22–23 July

Medalists
gold medal	Miles Chamley-Watson; Race Imboden; Alexander Massialas; Gerek Meinhardt	United States
silver medal	Erwann Le Péchoux; Enzo Lefort; Julien Mertine; Maxime Pauty	France
bronze medal	Giorgio Avola; Andrea Cassarà; Alessio Foconi; Daniele Garozzo	Italy

The Men's team foil competition at the 2019 World Fencing Championships was held on 22 and 23 July 2019.

== Draw ==
=== Finals ===
Semifinals
United States	45
Russia	30
France	45
Italy	32

Final
United States	45
France	32
Third place
Russia	32
Italy	45

=== Top half ===
==== Section 1 ====
Round of 64

Team 1	Score	Team 2
Ireland	38–45	Israel

Round of 32
United States	45
Israel	24
Hungary	45
Brazil	42
China	45
Singapore	23
Spain	32
Egypt	45

Round of 16
United States	45
Hungary	27
China	45
Egypt	31

Quarterfinals
United States	45
China	30

==== Section 2 ====
Round of 32
South Korea	45
Netherlands	38
Belgium	34
Great Britain	45
Ukraine	45
Colombia	42
Puerto Rico	28
Russia	45

Round of 16
South Korea	45
Great Britain	41
Ukraine	18
Russia	45

Quarterfinals
South Korea	28
Russia	45

=== Bottom half ===
==== Section 3 ====
Round of 64

Team 1	Score	Team 2
Argentina	37–45	Slovakia

Round of 32
France	45
Slovakia	23
Chinese Taipei	32
Canada	45
Germany	45
Chile	36
Thailand	28
Japan	45

Round of 16
France	45
Canada	32
Germany	45
Japan	37

Quarterfinals
France	45
Germany	24

==== Section 4 ====
Round of 64

Team 1	Score	Team 2
Mexico	45–43	Venezuela

Round of 32
Hong Kong	45
Philippines	27
Kuwait	16
Poland	45
Denmark	45
Australia	43
Mexico	22
Italy	45

Round of 16
Hong Kong	45
Poland	39
Denmark	29
Italy	45

Quarterfinals
Hong Kong	28
Italy	45

=== Placement rounds ===
==== 5–8th place bracket ====
5–8th place semifinals
China	43
South Korea	44
Germany	42
Hong Kong	45

Fifth place
South Korea	40
Hong Kong	45
Seventh place
China	45
Germany	42

==== 9–16th place bracket ====
9–16th place quarterfinals
Hungary	42
Egypt	45
Great Britain	45
Ukraine	34
Canada	31
Japan	45
Poland	43
Denmark	44

9–12th place semifinals
Egypt	35
Great Britain	45
Japan	45
Denmark	29

Ninth place
Great Britain	41
Japan	45
Eleventh place
Egypt	45
Denmark	42

==== 13–16th place bracket ====
13–16th place semifinals
Hungary	43
Ukraine	45
Canada	43
Poland	45

13th place
Ukraine	38
Poland	45
15th place
Hungary	45
Canada	32

== Final ranking ==
Rank	Team
1st place, gold medalist(s)	United States
2nd place, silver medalist(s)	France
3rd place, bronze medalist(s)	Italy
4	Russia
5	Hong Kong
6	South Korea
7	China
8	Germany
9	Japan
10	Great Britain
11	Egypt
12	Denmark
13	Poland
14	Ukraine
15	Hungary
16	Canada
17	Brazil
18	Australia
19	Chinese Taipei
20	Colombia
21	Belgium
22	Chile
23	Kuwait
24	Singapore
25	Spain
26	Philippines
27	Thailand
28	Netherlands
29	Puerto Rico
30	Slovakia
31	Mexico
32	Israel
33	Ireland
34	Venezuela
35	Argentina
