= Fencing at the 2011 Pan American Games – Men's team foil =

Men's team foil at the 2011 Pan American Games
- Venue: Multipurpose Gymnasium
- Dates: October 28
- Competitors: 31 from 8 nations

Medalists
Gold medal	Miles Chamley-Watson; Alexander Massialas; Gerek Meinhardt	United States
Silver medal	Etienne Turbide; Anthony Prymack; Nicolas Teisseire; Tigran Bajgoric	Canada
Bronze medal	Fernando Scavasin; Heitor Shimbo; Guilherme Toldo; Renzo Agresta	Brazil

The men's team foil competition of the fencing events at the 2011 Pan American Games in Guadalajara, Mexico, was held on October 28 at the Multipurpose Gymnasium. The defending champion was the team from the United States, who won the title in 2003 (this event was not held in 2007).

The team foil competition consisted of a three-round single-elimination bracket with a bronze medal match between the two semifinal losers and classification semifinals and finals for 5th to 8th places. Teams consist of three members each. Matches consist of nine bouts, with every fencer on one team facing each fencer on the other team. Scoring carried over between bouts with 45 touches being the team goal. Bouts lasted until one team reached the target multiple of 5 touches. For example, if the first bout ended with a score of 5–3, that score would remain into the next bout and the second bout would last until one team reached 10 touches. Bouts also had a maximum time of three minutes each; if the final bout ended before either team reached 45 touches, the team leading won. A tie at that point would result in an additional one-minute sudden-death period. This sudden-death period was further modified by selecting a draw-winner beforehand; if neither fencer scored a touch during the minute, the predetermined draw-winner won the bout.

== Schedule ==
All times are Central Standard Time (UTC-6).

Date	Time	Round
October 27, 2011	8:30	Quarterfinals
October 27, 2011	10:10	Fifth to eighth
October 27, 2011	10:20	Semifinals
October 27, 2011	11:50	Seventh place
October 27, 2011	11:50	Fifth place
October 27, 2011	11:50	Bronze medal match
October 27, 2011	19:00	Final

== Draw ==
=== Finals ===
Quarterfinals
1	United States	45
8	Cuba	28
4	Argentina	27
5	Mexico	45
3	Canada	45
6	Venezuela	22
7	Chile	31
2	Brazil	45

Semifinals
1	United States	45
5	Mexico	37
3	Canada	45
2	Brazil	40

Final
1	United States	45
3	Canada	35
Third place
5	Mexico	43
3	Brazil	45

=== Classification 5 – 8 ===
Classification
8	Cuba	45
4	Argentina	26
6	Venezuela	45
7	Chile	29

Fifth place
8	Cuba	33
6	Venezuela	45
Seventh place
4	Argentina	37
7	Chile	45

== Final classification ==
Rank	Team	Athlete
1st place, gold medalist(s)	United States	Miles Chamley-Watson; Alexander Massialas; Gerek Meinhardt
2nd place, silver medalist(s)	Canada	Etienne Turbide; Anthony Prymack; Nicolas Teisseire; Tigran Bajgoric
3rd place, bronze medalist(s)	Brazil	Fernando Scavasin; Heitor Shimbo; Guilherme Toldo; Renzo Agresta
4	Mexico	Raul Arizaga; Daniel Daniel; Ramses Herrera; Omar Carrillo
5	Venezuela	Carlos Rodriguez; Antonio Leal; Jhon Perez; Ruben Limardo
6	Cuba	Yosniel Alvarez; Pedro Mogena; Yoelkis Zamora; Yunior Reytor
7	Chile	Felipe Alvear; Pablo Alvear; Rubén Silva; Paris Inostroza
8	Argentina	Ezequiel Abello; Federico Muller; Felipe Saucedo; Jose Dominguez
