= Luis Enrique Patterson =

Jamaican fencer (born 1996)

Luis Patterson
Personal information
- Full name: Luis Enrique Patterson Arboin
- Nationality: Cuban Jamaican (Cuba) (Jamaica)
- Born: 18 March 1996 (age 30) Holguin, Cuba
- Height: 1.98 m (6 ft 6 in)

Fencing career
- Sport: Fencing
- Weapon: épée
- Hand: right-handed
- Club: Valour Fencing Club
- FIE ranking: current ranking
Medal record
Representing Cuba
Pan American Games
| Gold medal – first place | 2015 Toronto | Team épée |
| Gold medal – first place | 2019 Lima | Team épée |

Luis Enrique Patterson (born March 18, 1996) is a Cuban Jamaican épée fencer.

== Career ==
=== Cuba ===
Luis Enrique Patterson discovered a passion for fencing at the age of 8 while growing up in Cuba. In 2011, at the age of 16, Luis was invited by Jaine Hernandez to join the Cuban national team. As the youngest member, Patterson placed first in the 2015 El Salvador junior world cup in individual men's épée.

Patterson was recognized as one of the top Cuban athletes leading up to the 2019 Pan American games. At the XVIII Pan American Games held in Lima, Peru, Patterson and the Cuban team secured first place in men's team épée. Subsequently, in Toronto, Canada, they again placed first in men's team épée, aiming to qualify for the 2020 Tokyo Summer Olympics.

However, prior to the Cuban épée team's participation in the 2019 Bern Switzerland World Cup, Patterson left Cuba instead of competing. Upon arriving in Bern, he continued on to Vancouver, Canada, where he founded Valour Fencing Club.

Luis was obtained Jamaican citizenship through his mother and now competes for the Jamaican national team in individual men's épée.

== Achievements ==
=== Pan American Games ===
| Year | Location | Event | Place |
|---|---|---|---|
| 2019 | Toronto, Canada | Team Men's Épée | 1st |
| 2019 | Lima, Peru | Team Men's Épée | 1st |

=== Junior World Cup ===
| Year | Location | Event | Place |
|---|---|---|---|
| 2015 | San Salvador, El Salvador | Individual Men's Épée | 1st |

=== National Championship ===
| Year | Location | Event | Place |
|---|---|---|---|
| 2022 | Toronto, Canada | Individual Men's Épée | 2nd |
