= Guilherme Toldo =

Brazilian fencer (born 1992)

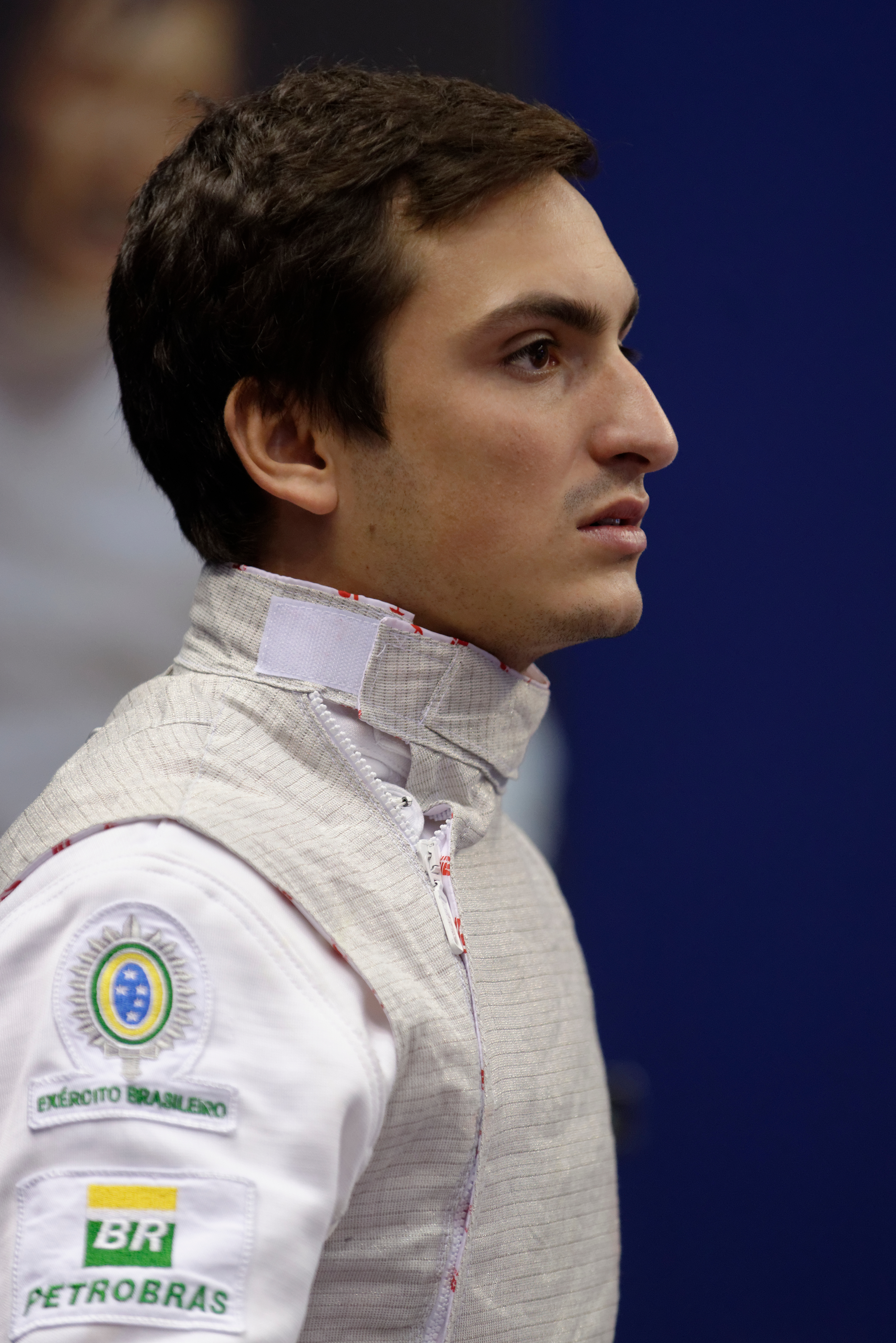
- At the 2014 Challenge International de Paris

Personal information
- Born: 1 September 1992 (age 34) Porto Alegre, Brazil
- Height: 1.65 m (5 ft 5 in)
- Weight: 52 kg (115 lb)

Fencing career
- Sport: Fencing
- Country: Brazil
- Weapon: foil
- Hand: left-handed
- FIE ranking: current ranking
Medal record
Men's fencing
Representing Brazil
Pan American Games
Silver medal – second place	2015 Toronto	Team foil
Silver medal – second place	2019 Lima	Team foil
Bronze medal – third place	2011 Guadalajara	Individual foil
Bronze medal – third place	2011 Guadalajara	Team foil
Bronze medal – third place	2023 Santiago	Individual foil
Bronze medal – third place	2023 Santiago	Team foil
Pan American Championships
Silver medal – second place	2009 San Salvador	Team
Silver medal – second place	2012 Cancún	Team
Silver medal – second place	2013 Cartagena	Team
Silver medal – second place	2015 Santiago	Team
Silver medal – second place	2016 Panama	Team
Silver medal – second place	2017 Montreal	Team
Silver medal – second place	2018 Habana	Team
Silver medal – second place	2019 Toronto	Individual
Silver medal – second place	2024 Lima	Team
Bronze medal – third place	2011 Reno	Team
Bronze medal – third place	2014 San José	Individual
Bronze medal – third place	2014 San José	Team
Bronze medal – third place	2019 Toronto	Team
Bronze medal – third place	2022 Asunción	Team
Bronze medal – third place	2023 Lima	Individual
Bronze medal – third place	2024 Lima	Individual
Bronze medal – third place	2026 Lima	Individual
South American Games
Gold medal – first place	2014 Santiago	Team foil
Gold medal – first place	2018 Cochabamba	Individual foil
Gold medal – first place	2018 Cochabamba	Team foil
Gold medal – first place	2022 Asunción	Team foil
Silver medal – second place	2022 Asunción	Individual foil
Silver medal – second place	2026 Santa Fe	Team foil

Guilherme Toldo (born 1 September 1992) is a Brazilian fencer. At the 2016 Summer Olympics he competed in the Men's foil, being defeated in the quarter-finals, obtaining the best male result in Brazil in fencing of all time.

== Career ==
At the age of 19, Toldo participated in the 2011 Pan American Games, where he won a bronze medal in the individual foil, as well as another bronze in teams.

Toldo debuted at the Olympic Games at the age of 19. At the 2012 Olympic Games, he won his first match against Moroccan Lahoussine Ali 15–6. But in the second fight, facing the American Race Imboden, 5th best in the world, he was eliminated by 15–5.

At the 2014 Pan American Fencing Championships, Toldo won a bronze medal in individual foil and another bronze in the team.

At the 2015 Pan American Games, Toldo won a silver medal in Men's team foil.

At the 2016 Olympic Games in Rio de Janeiro, Toldo had a historic campaign, winning three fights and reaching the quarterfinals, obtaining the best result in Brazilian men's fencing of all time. Number 66 in the world ranking, Toldo, after overcoming René Pranz in the 1st round, and the current world champion and silver medalist in Beijing 2008, Yuki Ota, in the 2nd round, competed in the round of 16 against Cheung Ka Long, from Hong Kong, and surprised once again to advance to the quarterfinals, beating the 20th best fencer in the world in the individual foil category by 15 to 10. In the quarterfinals, he faced the Italian Daniele Garozzo, number 11 in the world, being eliminated by 15–8. Garozzo ended up being the gold medalist at this Olympics.

At the 2019 World Fencing Championships, Toldo, 26th in the world, debuted by defeating the Japanese Takahiro Shikine, 19th in the world, by 15–13. In the second round, he defeated the American Nick Itkin, 11th in the world, by 15–14. He reached the round of 16, and, facing the Korean Lee Kwang-hyun, 17th in the world, Toldo opened 13–10 in the match, but was eliminated by 15–14, finishing 15th in the tournament.

At the 2019 Pan American Games, Toldo won a silver medal in Men's team foil.

In the 2019 Pan American Fencing Championships he won a silver in the individual competition and bronze in the team.

At the 2020 Summer Olympics, Toldo, now world No. 17, debuted in the individual foil against Toshiya Saito, world No. 27. After Toldo's blade broke at the beginning of the fight, and several challenges from Toldo about the refereeing (the equipment that recorded the touches had problems), the Brazilian ended up being eliminated by 15 to 10.

At the 2023 Pan American Fencing Championships, held in June, in Lima, Peru, Toldo obtained a bronze medal in the individual foil, being his third individual medal in that tournament throughout his career.

At the 2023 Pan American Games, he obtained his second individual bronze at Pans, in addition to obtaining a medal in the team modality for the fourth time, a bronze. With this, Toldo became the biggest Brazilian fencing medalist at the Pan-American Games. He has six, one more than swordsman Arthur Cramer Ribeiro, who holds the country's only gold in the sport, in Winnipeg 1967.
