= 2022 Pan American Fencing Championships =

Fencing championship in Asunción, Paraguay

- Host city: Asunción, Paraguay
- Dates: 3 June – 8 June
- Main venue: Polideportivo Central del Parque Olímpico

The 2022 Pan American Fencing Championships were held in Asunción, Paraguay at the Polideportivo Central del Parque Olímpico from June 3 to June 8, 2022.

This tournament qualified fencers for the 2023 Pan American Games in Santiago, Chile.

Paraguay won its first ever Pan American Fencing Championships senior medal, after Montserrat Viveros won the bronze medal in the individual Épée event.

== Medal summary ==
=== Medal table ===
* Host nation (Paraguay)

Rank	Nation	Gold	Silver	Bronze	Total
1	United States	7	4	4	15
2	Canada	2	5	4	11
3	Venezuela	2	2	2	6
4	Argentina	1	0	2	3
5	Colombia	0	1	1	2
6	Brazil	0	0	2	2
7	Chile	0	0	1	1
7	Mexico	0	0	1	1
7	Paraguay*	0	0	1	1
Totals (9 entries)		12	12	18	42

=== Men's events ===
Event	Gold	Silver	Bronze
Foil	Alexander Massialas; United States	Maximilien Van Haaster; Canada	Gerek Meinhardt; United States
Foil	Alexander Massialas; United States	Maximilien Van Haaster; Canada	Nick Itkin; United States
Épée	Ruben Limardo; Venezuela	Grabiel Lugo; Venezuela	Samuel Gallagher Pelletier; Canada
Épée	Ruben Limardo; Venezuela	Grabiel Lugo; Venezuela	Francisco Limardo; Venezuela
Sabre	Daryl Homer; United States	Eli Dershwitz; United States	Andrew Mackiewicz; United States
Sabre	Daryl Homer; United States	Eli Dershwitz; United States	Pascual Di Tella; Argentina
Team Foil	United States; Chase Emmer; Nick Itkin; Alexander Massialas; Gerek Meinhardt	Canada; Blake Broszus; Bogdan Hamilton; Eli Schenkel; Maximilien Van Haaster	Brazil; Henrique Marques; Paulo Morais; Heitor Shimbo; Guilherme Toldo
Team Épée	Venezuela; Jesus Limardo; Francisco Limardo; Ruben Limardo; Grabiel Lugo	Colombia; Mario Caceres Castellanos; Juan Castillo Gutierrez; Hernando Roa; Jhon Édison Rodríguez	Argentina; Jose Dominguez; Jesus Lugones Ruggeri; Lucio Perez Ondarts; Alessandro Taccani
Team Sabre	United States; Eli Dershwitz; Daryl Homer; Andrew Mackiewicz; Khalil Thompson	Canada; Fares Arfa; François Cauchon; Nicholas Dinu; Shaul Gordon	Colombia; Luis Correa; Sebastián Cuéllar; Mario Palacios

=== Women's events ===
Event	Gold	Silver	Bronze
Foil	Eleanor Harvey; Canada	Lee Kiefer; United States	Jacqueline Dubrovich; United States
Foil	Eleanor Harvey; Canada	Lee Kiefer; United States	Jessica Guo; Canada
Épée	Isabel Di Tella; Argentina	Katharine Holmes; United States	Liliana Tejada; Mexico
Épée	Isabel Di Tella; Argentina	Katharine Holmes; United States	Montserrat Viveros; Paraguay
Sabre	Anne-Elizabeth Stone; United States	Gabriella Page; Canada	Madison Thurgood; Canada
Sabre	Anne-Elizabeth Stone; United States	Gabriella Page; Canada	Shia Rodríguez; Venezuela
Team Foil	Canada; Sabrina Fang; Jessica Guo; Eleanor Harvey; Kelleigh Ryan	United States; Jacqueline Dubrovich; Lee Kiefer; Zander Rhodes; Maia Weintraub	Chile; Arantza Inostroza; Lisa Montecinos; Katina Proestakis; Rafaela Santibáñez
Team Épée	United States; Margherita Guzzi; Katharine Holmes; Hadley Husisian; Anna Van Brummen	Venezuela; Lizzie Asis; Clarismar Farias; Eliana Lugo; María Martínez	Canada; Ariane Leonard; Leonora Mackinnon; Alexanne Verret; Ruien Xiao
Team Sabre	United States; Honor Johnson; Tatiana Nazlymov; Anne-Elizabeth Stone; Elizabeth Tartakovsky	Canada; Tamar Gordon; Gabriella Page; Marissa Ponich; Madison Thurgood	Brazil; Pietra Chierighini; Luiza Lee; Luana Pekelman; Karina Trois
