= World Fencing League =

Professional fencing organization founded in 2025

- Current season, competition or edition: 2026 World Fencing League season
- Sport: Fencing
- Founded: 2025
- Founder: Miles Chamley-Watson
- CEO: Zhen Ren Teo
- Country: International
- Headquarters: Los Angeles, California, U.S.

The World Fencing League (WFL) is a professional fencing organization founded in late 2025 by British-born American Olympic fencer Miles Chamley-Watson and Chiron Sports Group. The league was established to modernize the sport through advanced technology, athlete-driven storytelling, and high-production entertainment values.

== History ==
The WFL was officially announced on November 20, 2025, in Los Angeles. The league was incubated by Chiron Sports Group, a sports-focused investment firm, alongside founder Miles Chamley-Watson.

In December 2025, the league reached a financial milestone by securing its first round of funding from the Flick Family Office. The legal proceedings for the financing were advised by the law firm Winston & Strawn, signaling the league's transition from a concept to a capitalized professional entity.

On January 7, 2026, the WFL signed a Memorandum of Understanding (MOU) with USA Fencing. This partnership was designed to connect elite professional competition with grassroots participation in the United States. This was followed in February 2026 by a partnership with UC San Diego Athletics to establish professional pathways for collegiate athletes.

By March 2026, the league moved into its final pre-launch phase for the "WFL Debut" scheduled for April 25, 2026, at The Shrine Auditorium in Los Angeles. During this month, the league confirmed its full inaugural roster and a US$100,000 grand prize purse.

=== Conflict with FIE ===
In October 2026, WFL announced events in Hong Kong scheduled for January 2027 and April 2027 including local Olympic gold medalist Cheung Ha-long, together with other elite fencers. The local Hong Kong Fencing association welcomed the event. Fencing's world governing body, the FIE, then released an extraordinary statement attempting to restrict athlete participation in the event.

== Events ==
Year	Date	Location	Team winner	Bouts won
2026	April 2025	(United States) Los Angeles	Team Shield	5:1
2027	January 2027	Hong Kong	-	-
2027	April 2027	Hong Kong	-	-

== Athletes ==
The league features a select roster of 12 elite fencers. Athletes are announced via the league's official digital channels, with several confirming their participation through verified social media posts.

Athlete	Country	Weapon	Notable Achievements	Participation
Eszter Muhari	Hungary	Épée		2026
Lee Kiefer	United States	Foil	3x Olympic Gold Medalist, 2x World Champion	2026
Ryan Choi	Hong Kong	Foil	1x World Champion	2026
Arianna Errigo	Italy	Foil	1x Olympic Gold Medalist, 10x World Champion	2026
Miles Chamley-Watson	United States	Foil	2x World Champion	2026
Oh Sang-uk	South Korea	Sabre	3x Olympic Gold Medalist, 5x World Champion	2026
Koki Kano	Japan	Épée	2x Olympic Gold Medalist, 2x World Champion	2026
Alexandra Ndolo	Kenya	Épée		2026
Gergely Siklósi	Hungary	Épée	1x Olympic Gold Medalist, 1x World Champion	2026
Michela Battiston	Italy	Sabre		2026
Jean-Philippe Patrice	France	Sabre		2026
Maia Chamberlain	United States	Sabre		2026

== Teams ==
Year	Team	Athletes
2026	Team Blade	(United States) Miles Chamley-Watson (United States) Lee Kiefer (c) (Hungary) Gergely Siklósi (Kenya) Alexandra Ndolo (South Korea) Oh Sang-uk (United States) Maia Chamberlain
2026	Team Shield	(Hong Kong) Ryan Choi (c) (Italy) Arianna Errigo (Italy) Michela Battiston (France) Jean-Philippe Patrice (Hungary) Eszter Muhari (Japan) Koki Kano

== Technology ==
The league employs Dentsu Lab's proprietary blade tracking technology to visualize weapon movements for broadcast audiences and Allez Go's AI system aimed at making "right-of-way" calls easier for viewers to follow.
