= Henrique Marques (fencer) =

Brazilian fencer (born 1996)

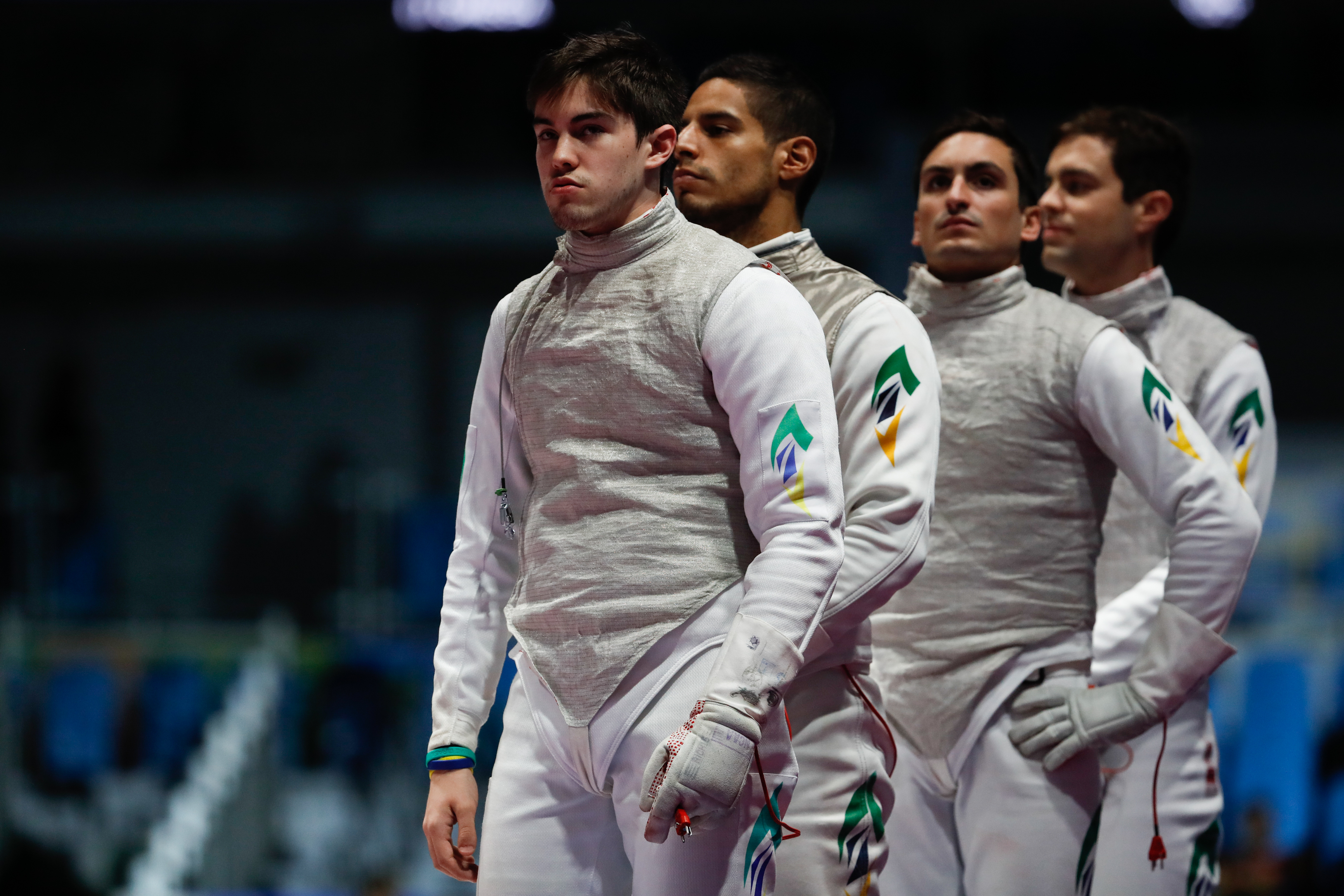
- Marques (front) at the 2016 Summer Olympics

Personal information
- Full name: Henrique Tavian Pereira Marques
- Born: 24 September 1996 (age 29) São Paulo

Sport
- Sport: Fencing
Medal record
Men's fencing
Representing Brazil
Pan American Games
Silver medal – second place	2019 Lima	Team foil
Bronze medal – third place	2023 Santiago	Team foil
Pan American Championships
Silver medal – second place	2016 Panama	Team
Silver medal – second place	2017 Montreal	Team
Silver medal – second place	2018 Habana	Team
Bronze medal – third place	2019 Toronto	Team
Bronze medal – third place	2022 Asuncion	Team
South American Games
Gold medal – first place	2018 Cochabamba	Team foil
Gold medal – first place	2022 Asunción	Team foil

Henrique Tavian Pereira Marques (born 24 September 1996) is a Brazilian fencer. He competed in the men's foil event at the 2016 Summer Olympics.
