= Tommaso Marini =

Italian fencer (born 2000)

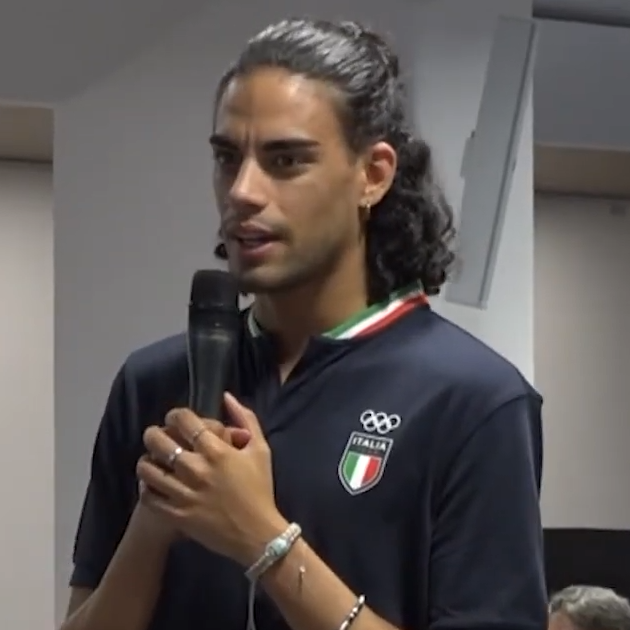
- Marini in 2024

Personal information
- Born: 17 April 2000 (age 26) Ancona, Italy
- Height: 194 cm (6 ft 4 in)

Fencing career
- Sport: Fencing
- Country: Italy
- Weapon: Foil
- Hand: Right-handed
- FIE ranking: current ranking
Medal record
Men's foil
Representing Italy
Olympic Games
Silver medal – second place	2024 Paris	Team
World Championships
Gold medal – first place	2022 Cairo	Team
Gold medal – first place	2023 Milan	Individual
Gold medal – first place	2025 Tbilisi	Team
Gold medal – first place	2026 Hong Kong	Team
Silver medal – second place	2022 Cairo	Individual
European Games
Gold medal – first place	2023 Kraków–Małopolska	Team
Junior World Championships
Silver medal – second place	2018 Verona	Individual
Bronze medal – third place	2019 Toruń	Team
European Championships
Gold medal – first place	2022 Antalya	Team
Gold medal – first place	2023 Kraków	Team
Gold medal – first place	2024 Basel	Individual
Gold medal – first place	2025 Genoa	Team
Gold medal – first place	2026 Antony	Team
Silver medal – second place	2022 Antalya	Individual
Bronze medal – third place	2024 Basel	Team
Bronze medal – third place	2025 Genoa	Individual

Tommaso Marini (born 17 April 2000) is an Italian right-handed foil fencer. He is an Olympic silver medallist in the team competition at the 2024 Paris Olympic Games, a five-time European champion and four-time World champion.

== Medal record ==
=== World Championship ===
Year	Location	Event	Position
2022	Cairo, Egypt	Individual Men's Foil	2nd
2022	Cairo, Egypt	Team Men's Foil	1st
2023	Milan, Italy	Individual Men's Foil	1st
2025	(Georgia (country)) Tbilisi, Georgia	Team Men's Foil	1st

=== European Championship ===
Year	Location	Event	Position
2022	Antalya, Turkey	Individual Men's Foil	2nd
2022	Antalya, Turkey	Team Men's Foil	1st

=== Grand Prix ===
Date	Location	Event	Position
2019-03-15	(United States) Anaheim, California	Individual Men's Foil	2nd
2022-05-13	Incheon, South Korea	Individual Men's Foil	1st

=== World Cup ===
Date	Location	Event	Position
2022-04-16	Belgrade, Serbia	Individual Men's Foil	1st
2022-04-29	Plovdiv, Bulgaria	Individual Men's Foil	3rd
