= 2010 Pan American Fencing Championships =

The 2010 Pan American Fencing Championships were held in San José, Costa Rica from 2 to 7 July.

== Medal summary ==
=== Men's events ===
Event	Gold	Silver	Bronze
Foil	Antonio Leal (VEN)	Miles Chamley-Watson (USA)	João Antônio Souza (BRA); Alexander Massialas (USA)
Épée	Guillermo Madrigal Sardinas (CUB)	Andres Carrillo Ayana (CUB)	Vincent Pelletier (CAN); Silvio Fernández (VEN)
Sabre	Vincent Couturier (CAN)	Hernán Jansen (VEN)	Nicolas Mayer (CAN); Philippe Beaudry (CAN)
Team Foil	United States	Venezuela	Mexico
Team Épée	Cuba	Canada	United States
Team Sabre	United States	Canada	Venezuela

=== Women's events ===
Event	Gold	Silver	Bronze
Foil	Lee Kiefer (USA)	Monica Peterson (CAN)	Misleydis Compañy La O (CUB); Doris Willette (USA)
Épée	Yamilka Rodriguez Quesada (CUB)	Kelley Hurley (USA)	Courtney Hurley (USA); Zuleidis Ortiz Fuente (CUB)
Sabre	Mariel Zagunis (USA)	Sandra Sassine (CAN)	Ibtihaj Muhammad (USA); Dagmara Wozniak (USA)
Team Foil	United States	Canada	Venezuela
Team Épée	Cuba	Canada	United States
Team Sabre	United States	Canada	Mexico

=== Medal table ===
Rank	Nation	Gold	Silver	Bronze	Total
1	United States	6	2	7	15
2	Cuba	4	1	2	7
3	Canada	1	7	3	11
4	Venezuela	1	2	3	6
5	Mexico	0	0	2	2
6	Brazil	0	0	1	1
Totals (6 entries)		12	12	18	42
