= Blake Broszus =

Canadian fencer (born 2000)

Personal information
- Nationality: Canadian
- Born: 22 November 2000 (age 25) Santa Clara, California, U.S.

Sport
- Sport: Fencing
Medal record
Men's fencing
Representing Canada
Pan American Games
Silver medal – second place	2023 Santiago	Team foil
Pan American Fencing Championships
Silver medal – second place	2022 Asuncion	Team foil
Bronze medal – third place	2024 Lima	Team foil

Blake Broszus (born 22 November 2000) is a Canadian fencer. He competed in the men's team foil event at the 2020 Summer Olympics.

Broszus qualified for his second Olympics in 2024, when he was named to Canada's 2024 Olympic team.
