= Eli Schenkel =

Canadian fencer (born 1992)

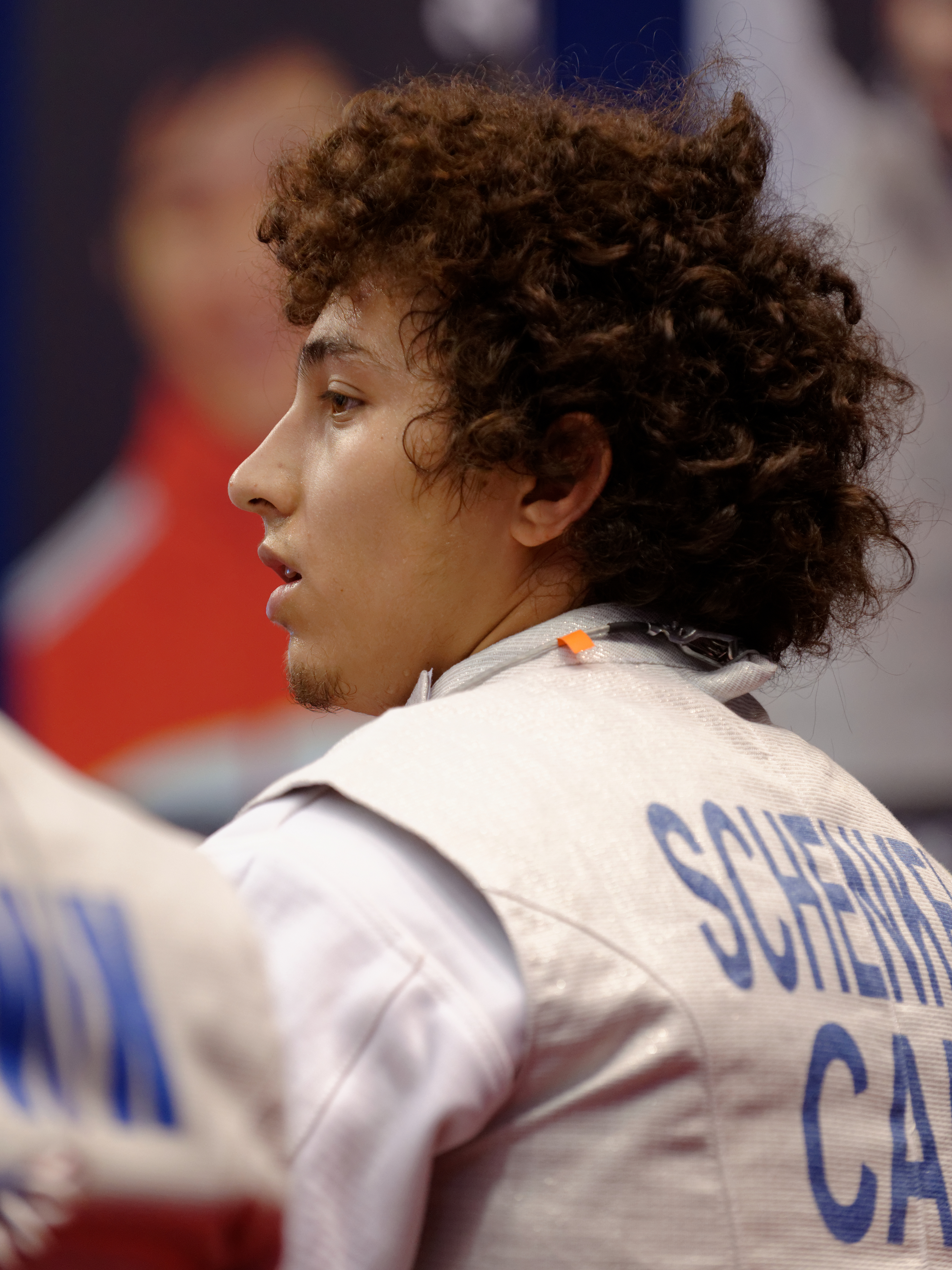
- Eli Schenkel of Canada during their T16 match against Italy in the team event of the 2014 Challenge International de Paris (men's foil World Cup).

Personal information
- Born: September 11, 1992 (age 33) Los Angeles, California, United States
- Height: 173 cm (5 ft 8 in)
- Weight: 69 kg (152 lb)
Medal record
Men's fencing
Representing Canada
Pan American Games
Silver medal – second place	2019 Lima	Team sabre
Bronze medal – third place	2019 Lima	Team Foil
Pan American Fencing Championships
Silver medal – second place	2022 Asuncion	Team foil
Bronze medal – third place	2015 Santiago	Team foil

Eli Schenkel (born September 11, 1992) is a Canadian foil fencer. Schenkel has represented the country on the international stage since 2013, and has competed at two Pan American Games and four World Fencing Championships. Schenkel also runs a fencing school in Richmond, British Columbia.

== Career ==
At the 2019 Pan American Games, Schenkel won two team medals.

=== Olympics ===
Schenkel represented Canada at the 2020 Summer Olympics.

== Personal ==
Schenkel has a MSc in Management from Durham University.
