= 2018 Pan American Fencing Championships =

- Host city: Havana, Cuba
- Dates: 15–20 June 2018
- Main venue: Coliseo de la Ciudad Deportiva

The 2018 Pan American Fencing Championships was held in Havana, Cuba from 15 to 20 June 2018 at the Coliseo de la Ciudad Deportiva.

The top seven teams (+ hosts Peru) in each team event qualified for the 2019 Pan American Games in Lima, Peru. After the seven teams in each event were determined, the top two athletes per individual event not qualified through a team would also qualify.

== Schedule ==
●	Opening Ceremony	●	Finals	●	Closing Ceremony

June	15	16	17	18	19	20	Total
Ceremonies	●					●	
Foil Individual		Men	Women				2
Épée Individual	Men	Women					2
Sabre Individual	Women		Men				2
Foil Team					Men	Women	2
Épée Team				Men	Women		2
Sabre Team				Women		Men	2
Total Gold Medals	2	2	2	2	2	2	12

== Medal summary ==
=== Men's events ===
Event	Gold	Silver	Bronze
Foil	Race Imboden; United States	Maximilien van Haaster; Canada	Alexander Massialas; United States
Foil	Race Imboden; United States	Maximilien van Haaster; Canada	Gerek Meinhardt; United States
Épée	Jesús Andrés Lugones Ruggeri; Argentina	Rubén Limardo; Venezuela	Curtis McDowald; United States
Épée	Jesús Andrés Lugones Ruggeri; Argentina	Rubén Limardo; Venezuela	Jacob Hoyle; United States
Sabre	Eli Dershwitz; United States	Shaul Gordon; Canada	Andrew Mackiewicz; United States
Sabre	Eli Dershwitz; United States	Shaul Gordon; Canada	Daryl Homer; United States
Team Foil	United States	Brazil	Canada
Team Épée	United States	Venezuela	Argentina
Team Sabre	United States	Canada	Argentina

=== Women's events ===
Event	Gold	Silver	Bronze
Foil	Lee Kiefer; United States	Kelleigh Ryan; Canada	Nzingha Prescod; United States
Foil	Lee Kiefer; United States	Kelleigh Ryan; Canada	Nicole Ross; United States
Épée	Kelley Hurley; United States	Isabel Di Tella; Argentina	Guo Zi Shan; Canada
Épée	Kelley Hurley; United States	Isabel Di Tella; Argentina	Yamilka Rodriguez Quesada; Cuba
Sabre	Dagmara Wozniak; United States	Anne-Elizabeth Stone; United States	María Belén Pérez Maurice; Argentina
Sabre	Dagmara Wozniak; United States	Anne-Elizabeth Stone; United States	Chloe Fox-Gitomer; United States
Team Foil	United States	Canada	Brazil
Team Épée	United States	Canada	Cuba
Team Sabre	United States	Mexico	Venezuela

== Medal table ==
Rank	Nation	Gold	Silver	Bronze	Total
1	United States (USA)	11	1	9	21
2	Argentina (ARG)	1	1	3	5
3	Canada (CAN)	0	6	2	8
4	Venezuela (VEN)	0	2	1	3
5	Brazil (BRA)	0	1	1	2
6	Mexico (MEX)	0	1	0	1
7	Cuba (CUB)	0	0	2	2
Totals (7 entries)		12	12	18	42

== Results ==
=== Men ===
==== Foil individual ====
Position	Name	Country
1st place, gold medalist(s)	Race Imboden	United States
2nd place, silver medalist(s)	Maximilien van Haaster	Canada
3rd place, bronze medalist(s)	Alexander Massialas	United States
3rd place, bronze medalist(s)	Gerek Meinhardt	United States
5.	Daniel Sconzo	Colombia
6.	Heitor Shimbo	Brazil
7.	Henrique Marques	Brazil
8.	Gustavo Alarcón	Chile

Quarter-finals
(United States) Alexander Massialas	15
(Colombia) Daniel Sconzo	8
(United States) Race Imboden	15
(Brazil) Heitor Shimbo	9
(Canada) Maximilien van Haaster	15
(Chile) Gustavo Alarcón	9
(Brazil) Henrique Marques	4
(United States) Gerek Meinhardt	15

Semi-finals
(United States) Alexander Massialas	12
(United States) Race Imboden	15
(Canada) Maximilien van Haaster	15
(United States) Gerek Meinhardt	9

Final
(United States) Race Imboden	15
(Canada) Maximilien van Haaster	8

==== Épée individual ====
Position	Name	Country
1st place, gold medalist(s)	Jesús Andrés Lugones Ruggeri	Argentina
2nd place, silver medalist(s)	Rubén Limardo	Venezuela
3rd place, bronze medalist(s)	Curtis McDowald	United States
3rd place, bronze medalist(s)	Jacob Hoyle	United States
5.	Francisco Limardo	Venezuela
6.	Jason Pryor	United States
7.	Jhon Édison Rodríguez	Colombia
8.	Yunior Reytor Venet	Cuba

Quarter-finals
(Venezuela) Francisco Limardo	7
(United States) Jacob Hoyle	8
(Argentina) Jesús Lugones	15
(Cuba) Yunior Reytor Venet	8
(United States) Curtis McDowald	15
(United States) Jason Pryor	12
(Colombia) Jhon Édison Rodríguez	7
(Venezuela) Rubén Limardo	8

Semi-finals
(United States) Jacob Hoyle	10
(Argentina) Jesús Lugones	15
(United States) Curtis McDowald	6
(Venezuela) Rubén Limardo	15

Final
(Argentina) Jesús Lugones	15
(Venezuela) Rubén Limardo	10

==== Sabre individual ====
Position	Name	Country
1st place, gold medalist(s)	Eli Dershwitz	United States
2nd place, silver medalist(s)	Shaul Gordon	Canada
3rd place, bronze medalist(s)	Andrew Mackiewicz	United States
3rd place, bronze medalist(s)	Daryl Homer	United States
5.	Eliécer Romero	Venezuela
6.	Benjamin Natanzon	United States
7.	Julián Ayala	Mexico
8.	Ricardo Álvarez	Chile

Quarter-finals
(United States) Eli Dershwitz	15
(United States) Benjamin Natanzon	10
(Venezuela) Eliécer Romero	10
(United States) Daryl Homer	15
(Mexico) Julián Ayala	12
(United States) Andrew Mackiewicz	15
(Chile) Ricardo Álvarez	13
(Canada) Shaul Gordon	15

Semi-finals
(United States) Eli Dershwitz	15
(United States) Daryl Homer	8
(United States) Andrew Mackiewicz	10
(Canada) Shaul Gordon	15

Final
(United States) Eli Dershwitz	15
(Canada) Shaul Gordon	9

==== Foil team ====
Position	Name	Country
1st place, gold medalist(s)	United States	
2nd place, silver medalist(s)	Brazil	
3rd place, bronze medalist(s)	Canada	
4.	Puerto Rico	
5.	Argentina	
6.	Mexico	
7.	Colombia	
8.	Chile	

Quarter-finals
United States	45
Colombia	8
Mexico	33
Canada	45
Chile	43
Puerto Rico	45
Argentina	24
Brazil	45

Semi-finals
United States	45
Canada	20
Puerto Rico	33
Brazil	45

Final
United States	45
Brazil	14
Third place
Canada	45
Puerto Rico	37

==== Épée team ====
Position	Name	Country
1st place, gold medalist(s)	United States	
2nd place, silver medalist(s)	Venezuela	
3rd place, bronze medalist(s)	Argentina	
4.	Brazil	
5.	Cuba	
6.	Mexico	
7.	Canada	
8.	Colombia	

Round of 16
Cuba (CUB)	45
Puerto Rico (PUR)	25
Brazil (BRA)	44
El Salvador (ESA)	18
Dominica (DMA)	16
Canada (CAN)	45
Argentina (ARG)	45
Peru (PER)	31
Costa Rica (CRC)	30
Colombia (COL)	45
Chile (CHI)	25
Mexico (MEX)	26
Dominican Republic (DOM)	17
Venezuela (VEN)	45

Quarterfinals
United States (USA)	45
Cuba (CUB)	43
Brazil (BRA)	43
Canada (CAN)	33
Argentina (ARG)	45
Colombia (COL)	43
Mexico (MEX)	25
Venezuela (VEN)	45

Semifinals
United States (USA)	45
Brazil (BRA)	35
Argentina (ARG)	30
Venezuela (VEN)	42

Gold medal
United States (USA)	45
Venezuela (VEN)	36
Bronze medal
Brazil (BRA)	35
Argentina (ARG)	45

==== Sabre team ====
Position	Name	Country
1st place, gold medalist(s)	United States	
2nd place, silver medalist(s)	Canada	
3rd place, bronze medalist(s)	Argentina	
4.	Venezuela	
5.	Colombia	
6.	Cuba	
7.	Brazil	
8.	Puerto Rico	

Quarter-finals
United States	45
Puerto Rico	20
Argentina	45
Cuba	41
Colombia	37
Venezuela	45
Brazil	37
Canada	45

Semi-finals
United States	45
Argentina	19
Venezuela	39
Canada	45

Final
United States	45
Canada	30
Third place
Argentina	45
Venezuela	42

=== Women ===
==== Foil individual ====
Position	Name	Country
1st place, gold medalist(s)	Lee Kiefer	United States
2nd place, silver medalist(s)	Kelleigh Ryan	Canada
3rd place, bronze medalist(s)	Nicole Ross	United States
3rd place, bronze medalist(s)	Nzingha Prescod	United States
5.	Eleanor Harvey	Canada
6.	Alanna Goldie	Canada
7.	Saskia Garcia	Colombia
8.	Margaret Lu	United States

Quarter-finals
(United States) Nzingha Prescod	15
(United States) Margaret Lu	13
(United States) Lee Kiefer	15
(United States) Alanna Goldie	12
(Canada) Kelleigh Ryan	15
(Colombia) Saskia Garcia	6
(United States) Nicole Ross	8
(Canada) Eleanor Harvey	7

Semi-finals
(United States) Nzingha Prescod	14
(United States) Lee Kiefer	15
(Canada) Kelleigh Ryan	14
(United States) Nicole Ross	5

Final
(United States) Lee Kiefer	15
(Canada) Kelleigh Ryan	12

==== Épée individual ====
Position	Name	Country
1st place, gold medalist(s)	Kelley Hurley	United States
2nd place, silver medalist(s)	Isabel Di Tella	Argentina
3rd place, bronze medalist(s)	Guo Zi Shan	Canada
3rd place, bronze medalist(s)	Yamilka Rodriguez Quesada	Cuba
5.	Nathalie Moellhausen	Brazil
6.	Malinka Hoppe Montanaro	Canada
7.	María Martínez	Venezuela
8.	Elizabeth Medina	Mexico

Quarter-finals
(Mexico) Elizabeth Medina	14
(Canada) Guo Zi Shan	15
(United States) Kelley Hurley	15
(Canada) Malinka Hoppe	8
(Venezuela) María Martínez	Abd.
(Cuba) Yamilka Rodriguez
(Argentina) Isabel Di Tella	7
(Brazil) Nathalie Moellhausen	3

Semi-finals
(Canada) Guo Zi Shan	12
(United States) Kelley Hurley	15
(Cuba) Yamilka Rodriguez	10
(Argentina) Isabel Di Tella	15

Final
(United States) Kelley Hurley	15
(Argentina) Isabel Di Tella	14

==== Sabre individual ====
Position	Name	Country
1st place, gold medalist(s)	Dagmara Wozniak	United States
2nd place, silver medalist(s)	Anne-Elizabeth Stone	United States
3rd place, bronze medalist(s)	María Belén Pérez Maurice	Argentina
3rd place, bronze medalist(s)	Chloe Fox-Gitomer	United States
5.	Monica Aksamit	United States
6.	Milagros Pastrán	Venezuela
7.	Natalia Botello	Mexico
8.	Alejandra Benítez	Venezuela

Quarter-finals
(United States) Anne-Elizabeth Stone	15
(Venezuela) Alejandra Benítez	12
(Argentina) María Pérez	15
(United States) Monica Aksamit	13
(United States) Chloe Fox-Gitomer	15
(Venezuela) Milagros Pastrán	10
(Mexico) Natalia Botello	11
(United States) Dagmara Wozniak	15

Semi-finals
(United States) Anne-Elizabeth Stone	15
(Argentina) María Pérez	12
(United States) Chloe Fox-Gitomer	6
(United States) Dagmara Wozniak	15

Final
(United States) Anne-Elizabeth Stone	9
(United States) Dagmara Wozniak	15

==== Foil team ====
Position	Name	Country
1st place, gold medalist(s)	United States	
2nd place, silver medalist(s)	Canada	
3rd place, bronze medalist(s)	Brazil	
4.	Argentina	
5.	Mexico	
6.	Cuba	
7.	Colombia	
8.	Chile	

Quarter-finals
United States	45
Colombia	11
Brazil	45
Mexico	35
Argentina	36
Chile	35
Cuba	28
Canada	45

Semi-finals
United States	45
Brazil	21
Argentina	16
Canada	45

Final
United States	45
Canada	38
Third place
Brazil	45
Argentina	27

==== Épée team ====
Position	Name	Country
1st place, gold medalist(s)	United States	
2nd place, silver medalist(s)	Canada	
3rd place, bronze medalist(s)	Cuba	
4.	Brazil	
5.	Argentina	
6.	Venezuela	
7.	Mexico	
8.	Costa Rica	

Quarter-finals
United States	45
Mexico	35
Cuba	45
Venezuela	35
Argentina	34
Brazil	45
Costa Rica	23
Canada	45

Semi-finals
United States	45
Cuba	44
Brazil	44
Canada	45

Final
United States	45
Canada	33
Third place
Cuba	45
Brazil	35

==== Sabre team ====
Position	Name	Country
1st place, gold medalist(s)	United States	
2nd place, silver medalist(s)	Mexico	
3rd place, bronze medalist(s)	Venezuela	
4.	Canada	
5.	Argentina	
6.	Colombia	
7.	Dominican Republic	
8.	Brazil	

Quarter-finals
United States	45
Brazil	38
Colombia	31
Venezuela}	45
Canada	45
Argentina	27
Dominican Republic	39
Mexico	45

Semi-finals
United States	45
Venezuela	43
Canada	42
Mexico	45

Final
United States	45
Mexico	40
Third place
Venezuela	45
Canada	24

== See also ==
- Fencing at the 2019 Pan American Games – Qualification
