= Daniele Garozzo =

Italian fencer (born 1992)

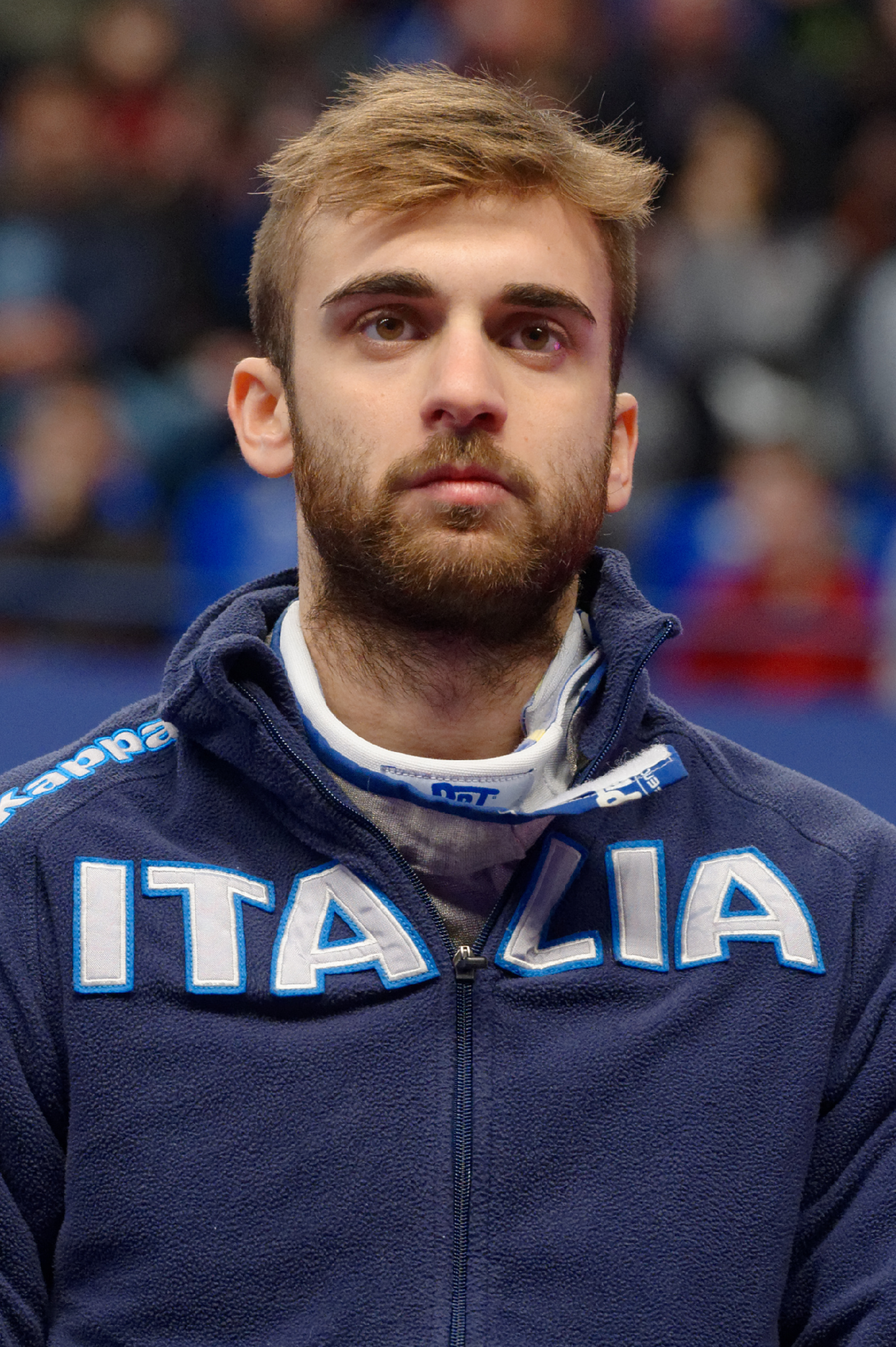
- Garozzo in 2017

Personal information
- Born: 4 August 1992 (age 34) Acireale, Italy
- Height: 1.78 m (5 ft 10 in)

Fencing career
- Sport: Fencing
- Country: Italy
- Weapon: Foil
- Hand: right-handed
- National coach: Andrea Cipressa
- Club: GS Fiamme Gialle
- Head coach: Fabio Galli
- FIE ranking: current ranking
Medal record
Men's foil
Representing Italy
Olympic Games
Gold medal – first place	2016 Rio de Janeiro	Individual
Silver medal – second place	2020 Tokyo	Individual
World Championships
Gold medal – first place	2015 Moscow	Team
Gold medal – first place	2017 Leipzig	Team
Gold medal – first place	2018 Wuxi	Team
Gold medal – first place	2022 Cairo	Team
Bronze medal – third place	2017 Leipzig	Individual
Bronze medal – third place	2019 Budapest	Team
European Games
Gold medal – first place	2023 Kraków–Małopolska	Team
European Championships
Gold medal – first place	2017 Tbilisi	Individual
Gold medal – first place	2022 Antalya	Individual
Gold medal – first place	2022 Antalya	Team
Gold medal – first place	2023 Kraków	Team
Silver medal – second place	2015 Montreux	Individual
Silver medal – second place	2016 Toruń	Team
Silver medal – second place	2018 Novi Sad	Individual
Silver medal – second place	2018 Novi Sad	Team
Silver medal – second place	2019 Düsseldorf	Individual
Bronze medal – third place	2017 Tbilisi	Team
Bronze medal – third place	2019 Düsseldorf	Team

Daniele Garozzo ([daˈnjɛːle ɡaˈrɔttso]; born 4 August 1992) is an Italian right-handed foil fencer.

Garozzo is a 2022 team European champion, two-time individual European champion, and four-time team world champion.

A two-time Olympian, Garozzo is a 2021 individual Olympic silver medalist and 2016 individual Olympic champion.

He is the younger brother of Italian épée fencer Enrico Garozzo.

== Career ==
Garozzo won the 2008 Cadet World Championships at home in Acireale, then took a silver medal in the 2011 and 2012 Junior World Championships. In the 2013 Summer Universiade he was defeated in the semifinals by Russia's Aleksey Cheremisinov and came away with a bronze medal. In the 2014–15 season he climbed his first World Cup podium with a silver medal in the Challenge International de Paris. He earned a silver medal at the 2015 European Championships after being defeated in the final by teammate Andrea Cassarà.

Ranked number 11 in the world, Garozzo was the surprise winner of the gold medal in the Men's Individual Foil at the 2016 Summer Olympics, beating the American world number 1 Alexander Massialas in the final; his victory raised his world ranking to number 2. In the same event at the next Olympics in 2021, he was defeated by Cheung Ka Long from Hong Kong with a score of 15–11, claiming his first Olympic silver medal.

In June 2022, Garozzo won the gold medal in the men's foil event at the 2022 European Fencing Championships held in Antalya, Turkey.

== Medal record ==
=== Olympic Games ===
Year	Location	Event	Position
2016	Rio de Janeiro, Brazil	Individual Men's Foil	1st
2021	Tokyo, Japan	Individual Men's Foil	2nd

=== World Championship ===
Year	Location	Event	Position
2015	Moscow, Russia	Team Men's Foil	1st
2017	Leipzig, Germany	Individual Men's Foil	3rd
2017	Leipzig, Germany	Team Men's Foil	1st
2018	Wuxi, China	Team Men's Foil	1st
2019	Budapest, Hungary	Team Men's Foil	3rd
2022	Cairo, Egypt	Team Men's Foil	1st

=== European Championship ===
Year	Location	Event	Position
2015	Montreux, Switzerland	Individual Men's Foil	2nd
2016	Toruń, Poland	Team Men's Foil	2nd
2017	(Georgia (country)) Tbilisi, Georgia	Individual Men's Foil	1st
2017	(Georgia (country)) Tbilisi, Georgia	Team Men's Foil	3rd
2018	Novi Sad, Serbia	Individual Men's Foil	2nd
2018	Novi Sad, Serbia	Team Men's Foil	2nd
2019	Düsseldorf, Germany	Individual Men's Foil	2nd
2019	Düsseldorf, Germany	Team Men's Foil	3rd
2022	Antalya, Turkey	Individual Men's Foil	1st
2022	Antalya, Turkey	Team Men's Foil	1st

=== Grand Prix ===
Date	Location	Event	Position
2015-03-13	Havana, Cuba	Individual Men's Foil	3rd
2017-03-17	(United States) Long Beach, California	Individual Men's Foil	3rd

=== World Cup ===
Date	Location	Event	Position
2015-01-16	Paris, France	Individual Men's Foil	2nd
2015-05-01	St. Petersburg, Russia	Individual Men's Foil	3rd
2016-02-05	Bonn, Germany	Individual Men's Foil	3rd
2017-05-05	St. Petersburg, Russia	Individual Men's Foil	1st
2018-01-19	Paris, France	Individual Men's Foil	2nd
2019-01-25	Tokyo, Japan	Individual Men's Foil	3rd
2019-03-01	Cairo, Egypt	Individual Men's Foil	1st
2019-12-13	Tokyo, Japan	Individual Men's Foil	3rd
2020-01-10	Paris, France	Individual Men's Foil	2nd
2022-04-29	Plovdiv, Bulgaria	Individual Men's Foil	2nd
