= Gerek Meinhardt =

American fencer (born 1990)

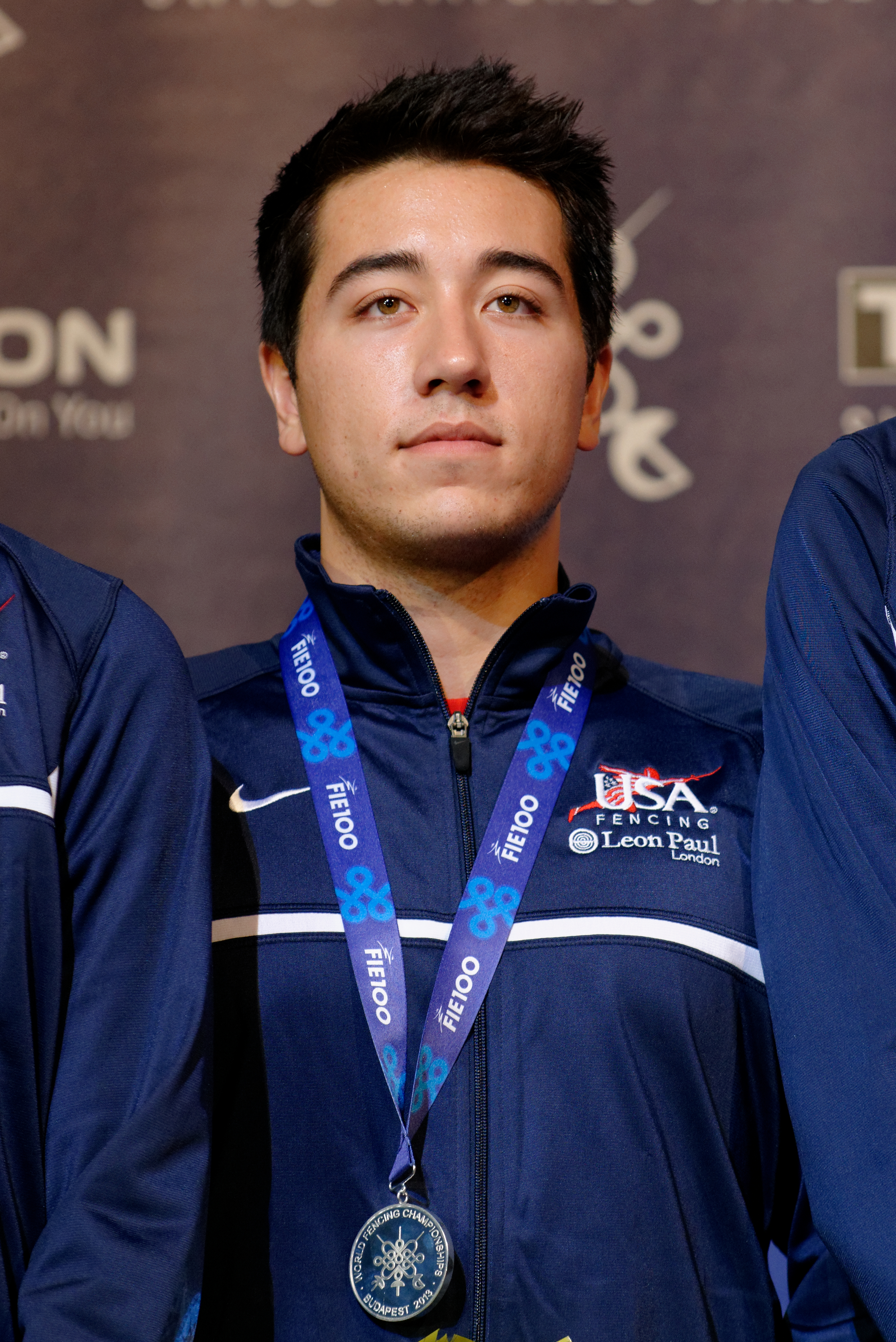
- Meinhardt at the 2013 World Fencing Championships

Personal information
- Born: Gerek Lin Meinhardt; July 27, 1990 (age 36) San Francisco, California, U.S.
- Height: 1.83 m (6 ft 0 in)
- Weight: 77 kg (170 lb)

Fencing career
- Sport: Fencing
- Country: United States
- Weapon: Foil
- Hand: Right-handed
- National coach: Greg Massialas
- Club: Notre Dame / Massialas Foundation
- FIE ranking: current ranking
Medal record
Men's foil
Representing the United States
Olympic Games
Bronze medal – third place	2016 Rio de Janeiro	Team
Bronze medal – third place	2020 Tokyo	Team
World Championships
Gold medal – first place	2019 Budapest	Team
Silver medal – second place	2013 Budapest	Team
Silver medal – second place	2017 Leipzig	Team
Silver medal – second place	2018 Wuxi	Team
Silver medal – second place	2022 Cairo	Team
Silver medal – second place	2025 Tbilisi	Team
Bronze medal – third place	2010 Paris	Individual
Bronze medal – third place	2015 Moscow	Individual
Pan American Games
Gold medal – first place	2011 Guadalajara	Team
Gold medal – first place	2015 Toronto	Team
Gold medal – first place	2019 Lima	Individual
Gold medal – first place	2019 Lima	Team
Gold medal – first place	2023 Santiago	Team
Silver medal – second place	2015 Toronto	Individual
Pan American Championships
Gold medal – first place	2007 Montreal	Individual
Gold medal – first place	2008 Querétaro City	Team
Gold medal – first place	2009 San Salvador	Team
Gold medal – first place	2010 San José	Team
Gold medal – first place	2011 Reno, Nevada	Team
Gold medal – first place	2012 Cancún	Team
Gold medal – first place	2013 Cartagena	Individual
Gold medal – first place	2013 Cartagena	Team
Gold medal – first place	2014 San José	Individual
Gold medal – first place	2014 San José	Team
Gold medal – first place	2016 Panama City	Team
Gold medal – first place	2017 Montreal	Team
Gold medal – first place	2018 Havana	Team
Gold medal – first place	2019 Toronto	Team
Gold medal – first place	2022 Asunción	Team
Gold medal – first place	2023 Lima	Individual
Gold medal – first place	2023 Lima	Team
Gold medal – first place	2024 Lima	Team
Gold medal – first place	2025 Rio de Janeiro	Team
Silver medal – second place	2007 Montreal	Team
Silver medal – second place	2008 Querétaro City	Individual
Silver medal – second place	2009 San Salvador	Individual
Silver medal – second place	2024 Lima	Individual
Bronze medal – third place	2011 Reno, Nevada	Individual
Bronze medal – third place	2012 Cancún	Individual
Bronze medal – third place	2015 Santiago	Individual
Bronze medal – third place	2017 Montreal	Individual
Bronze medal – third place	2018 Havana	Individual
Bronze medal – third place	2019 Toronto	Individual
Bronze medal – third place	2022 Asunción	Individual
Bronze medal – third place	2025 Rio de Janeiro	Individual

Gerek Lin Meinhardt (/ˈɡɛrɪk ˈmaɪnhɑːrt/ GHERR-ik MYNE-hart; born July 27, 1990) is an American right-handed foil fencer. Meinhardt is a two-time individual NCAA champion, 12-time team Pan American champion, three-time individual Pan American champion and 2019 team world champion. A five-time Olympian, Meinhardt is a two-time team Olympic bronze medalist. Meinhardt competed in the 2008 Beijing Olympic Games, the 2012 London Olympic Games, the 2016 Rio de Janeiro Olympic Games, the 2020 Tokyo Olympic Games, and the 2024 Paris Olympic Games.

== Early and personal life ==
Meinhardt is one of two children born to Kurt and Jane Meinhardt. His mother is Taiwanese.

Meinhardt attended Lick-Wilmerding High School in San Francisco for two years and completed high school in a home schooling program. He attended the University of Notre Dame on a full fencing scholarship. He majored in business and finance, and was a member of the school's fencing team from 2009 to 2014. Gerek was employed by Deloitte Advisory before enrolling at the University of Kentucky College of Medicine in 2020. He married fellow American fencer Lee Kiefer in September 2019.

== Fencing career ==
Introduced to the sport at age 9 through a program run by Olympic fencer Greg Massialas, Meinhardt began participating in national fencing competitions a year later. At age 16 he became the youngest men's national foil champion when he won the tournament at the 2007 U.S. Fencing National Championships.

By winning at the 2014 NCAA Fencing National Championships, he joined female fencer Lee Kiefer and swimmer Emma Reaney as part of the 2nd Notre Dame Fighting Irish trio to be named individual national champion in a single year and the 4th to be either individual national champion or national athlete of the year in a single year.

Ranked 16th in the world at the time, he participated in the 2008 Summer Olympics in Beijing as a member of the United States fencing team. He was the youngest fencer in Beijing and the youngest U.S. Olympic fencer of all time. At the 2010 World Fencing Championships in Paris, he won a bronze medal in the men's foil event, tying with Yuki Ota of Japan. After his gold medal win at the 2012 U.S. National Championships, he was selected as an alternate fencer for the 2012 London Olympics U.S. men's foil team. For the 2016 Rio Olympics he was selected as a member of the United States fencing team and won the bronze medal in the team foil competition. He again qualified for the United States fencing team at the 2020 Olympics in Tokyo where he won his second consecutive bronze medal.

Meinhardt is a member of the FIE Hall of Fame.

== Medal record ==
=== Olympic Games ===
Year	Location	Event	Position
2016	Rio de Janeiro, Brazil	Team Men's Foil	3rd
2021	Tokyo, Japan	Team Men's Foil	3rd

=== World Championship ===
Year	Location	Event	Position
2010	Paris, France	Individual Men's Foil	3rd
2013	Budapest, Hungary	Team Men's Foil	2nd
2015	Moscow, Russia	Individual Men's Foil	3rd
2017	Leipzig, Germany	Team Men's Foil	2nd
2018	Wuxi, China	Team Men's Foil	2nd
2019	Budapest, Hungary	Team Men's Foil	1st
2022	Cairo, Egypt	Team Men's Foil	2nd
2025	(Georgia (country)) Tbilisi, Georgia	Team Men's Foil	2nd

=== Grand Prix ===
Date	Location	Event	Position
2013-03-16	Venice, Italy	Individual Men's Foil	2nd
2013-05-04	Tokyo, Japan	Individual Men's Foil	2nd
2014-05-03	Tokyo, Japan	Individual Men's Foil	1st
2019-02-08	Turin, Italy	Individual Men's Foil	3rd
2020-02-07	Turin, Italy	Individual Men's Foil	1st
2021-03-26	Doha, Qatar	Individual Men's Foil	1st
2023-02-12	Turin, Italy	Individual Men's Foil	1st
2023-03-17	Busan, South Korea	Individual Men's Foil	3rd
2024-05-18	Shanghai, China	Individual Men's Foil	2nd

=== World Cup ===
Date	Location	Event	Position
2008-06-13	Guarico, Venezuela	Individual Men's Foil	3rd
2013-02-22	A Coruña, Spain	Individual Men's Foil	3rd
2014-01-17	Paris, France	Individual Men's Foil	3rd
2015-11-06	Tokyo, Japan	Individual Men's Foil	3rd
2016-01-15	Paris, France	Individual Men's Foil	3rd
2017-11-10	Tokyo, Japan	Individual Men's Foil	3rd
2019-01-11	Paris, France	Individual Men's Foil	2nd
2019-11-08	Bonn, Germany	Individual Men's Foil	2nd
2023-05-05	Acapulco, Mexico	Individual Men's Foil	3rd
2023-05-05	Acapulco, Mexico	Team Men's Foil	1st
2025-01-12	Paris, France	Team Men's Foil	3rd
2025-03-07	Cairo, Egypt	Individual Men's Foil	3rd
2025-03-09	Cairo, Egypt	Team Men's Foil	2nd
2025-05-04	Vancouver, Canada	Team Men's Foil	1st
2026-01-11	Paris, France	Team Men's Foil	2nd

=== Pan American Championship ===
Year	Location	Event	Position
2007	Montreal, Canada	Individual Men's Foil	1st
2007	Montreal, Canada	Team Men's Foil	2nd
2008	Querétaro City, Mexico	Individual Men's Foil	2nd
2008	Querétaro City, Mexico	Team Men's Foil	1st
2009	San Salvador, El Salvador	Individual Men's Foil	2nd
2009	San Salvador, El Salvador	Team Men's Foil	1st
2010	San José, Costa Rica	Team Men's Foil	1st
2011	(United States) Reno, Nevada	Individual Men's Foil	3rd
2011	(United States) Reno, Nevada	Team Men's Foil	1st
2012	Cancún, Mexico	Individual Men's Foil	3rd
2012	Cancún, Mexico	Team Men's Foil	1st
2013	Cartagena, Colombia	Individual Men's Foil	1st
2013	Cartagena, Colombia	Team Men's Foil	1st
2014	San José, Costa Rica	Individual Men's Foil	1st
2014	San José, Costa Rica	Team Men's Foil	1st
2015	Santiago, Chile	Individual Men's Foil	3rd
2016	Panama City, Panama	Team Men's Foil	1st
2017	Montreal, Canada	Individual Men's Foil	3rd
2017	Montreal, Canada	Team Men's Foil	1st
2018	Havana, Cuba	Individual Men's Foil	3rd
2018	Havana, Cuba	Team Men's Foil	1st
2019	Toronto, Canada	Individual Men's Foil	3rd
2019	Toronto, Canada	Team Men's Foil	1st
2022	Asunción, Paraguay	Individual Men's Foil	3rd
2022	Asunción, Paraguay	Team Men's Foil	1st
2023	Lima, Peru	Individual Men's Foil	1st
2023	Lima, Peru	Team Men's Foil	1st
2024	Lima, Peru	Individual Men's Foil	2nd
2024	Lima, Peru	Team Men's Foil	1st
2025	Rio de Janeiro, Brazil	Individual Men's Foil	3rd
2025	Rio de Janeiro, Brazil	Team Men's Foil	1st

== See also ==
- List of USFA Division I National Champions
- List of NCAA fencing champions
