= 2019 Pan American Fencing Championships =

Fencing championship

- Host city: Toronto, Canada
- Dates: 27 June – 2 July
- Main venue: Delta Hotel Toronto Airport and Conference Centre

The 2019 Pan American Fencing Championships were held in Toronto, Canada from 27 June to July 2, 2019. The competition was held at the Delta Hotel Toronto Airport and Conference Centre.

== Medal summary ==
=== Men's events ===
Event	Gold	Silver	Bronze
Foil	Race Imboden; United States	Guilherme Toldo; Brazil	Alexander Massialas; United States
Foil	Race Imboden; United States	Guilherme Toldo; Brazil	Gerek Meinhardt; United States
Épée	Rubén Limardo; Venezuela	Jesús Limardo; Venezuela	Jose Felix Dominguez; Argentina
Épée	Rubén Limardo; Venezuela	Jesús Limardo; Venezuela	Yunior Venet Reytor; Cuba
Sabre	Eli Dershwitz; United States	Daryl Homer; United States	Joseph Polossifakis; Canada
Sabre	Eli Dershwitz; United States	Daryl Homer; United States	Pascual Di Tella; Argentina
Team Foil	United States	Canada	Brazil
Team Épée	Cuba	United States	Argentina
Team Sabre	United States	Canada	Argentina

=== Women's events ===
Event	Gold	Silver	Bronze
Foil	Nicole Ross; United States	Guo Zi Shan; Canada	Kelleigh Ryan; Canada
Foil	Nicole Ross; United States	Guo Zi Shan; Canada	Eleanor Harvey; Canada
Épée	Kelley Hurley; United States	Maria Martinez; Venezuela	Maria Luisa Doig; Peru
Épée	Kelley Hurley; United States	Maria Martinez; Venezuela	Nathalie Moellhausen; Brazil
Sabre	Anne-Elizabeth Stone; United States	Mariel Zagunis; United States	Gabriella Page; Canada
Sabre	Anne-Elizabeth Stone; United States	Mariel Zagunis; United States	María Belén Pérez Maurice; Argentina
Team Foil	United States	Canada	Chile
Team Épée	United States	Brazil	Canada
Team Sabre	United States	Canada	Mexico

== Medal table ==
* Host nation (Canada)

Rank	Nation	Gold	Silver	Bronze	Total
1	United States	10	3	2	15
2	Venezuela	1	2	0	3
3	Cuba	1	0	1	2
4	Canada*	0	5	5	10
5	Brazil	0	2	2	4
6	Argentina	0	0	5	5
7	Chile	0	0	1	1
7	Mexico	0	0	1	1
7	Peru	0	0	1	1
Totals (9 entries)		12	12	18	42
