= Maximilien Van Haaster =

Canadian fencer (born 1992)

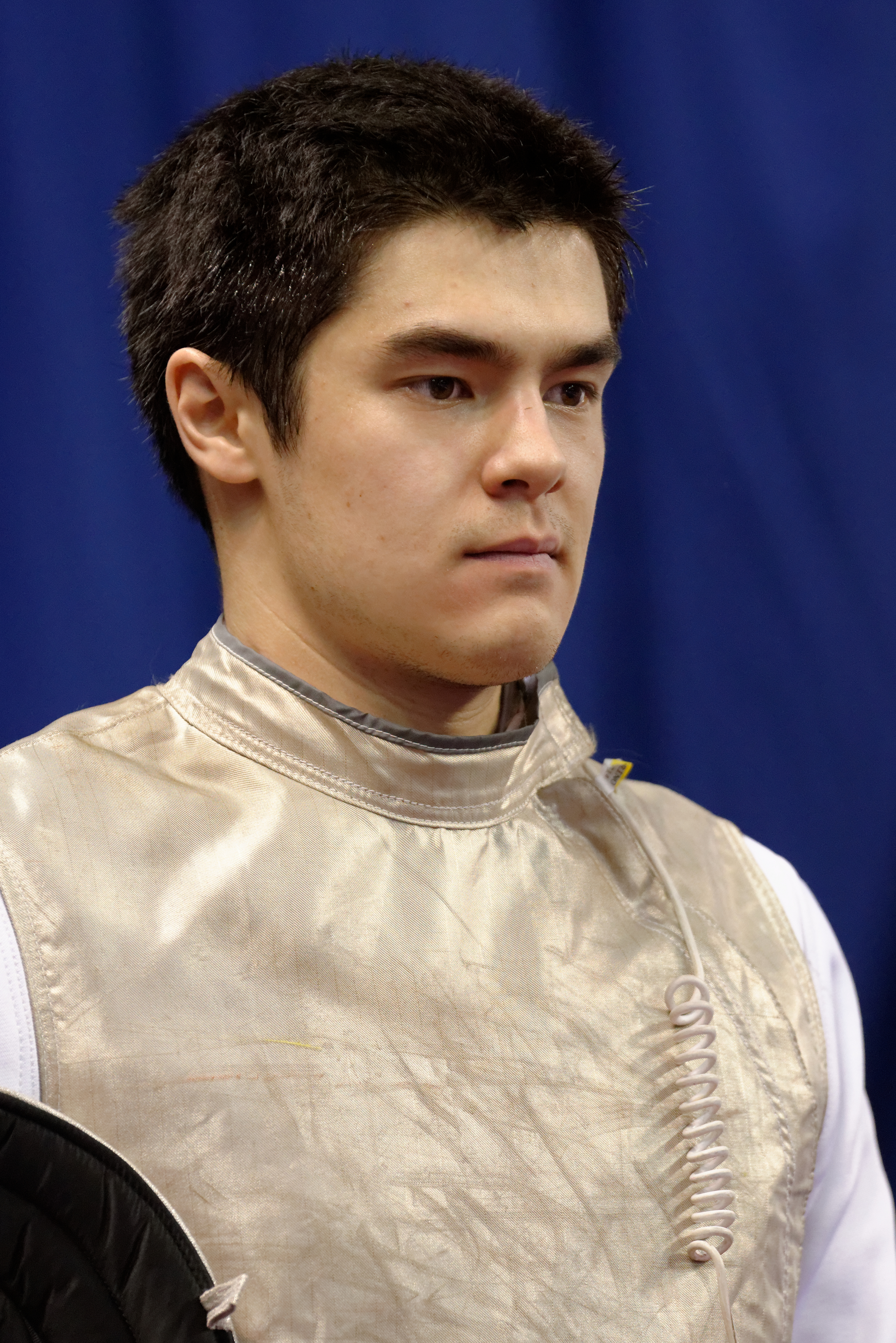

Personal information
- Born: June 19, 1992 (age 34) Montreal, Quebec, Canada
- Home town: Montreal, Quebec, Canada
- Height: 185 cm (6 ft 1 in)
- Weight: 88 kg (194 lb)

Fencing career
- Sport: Fencing
- Country: Canada
- Weapon: foil
- Hand: right-handed
- FIE ranking: current ranking
Medal record
Pan American Games
Silver medal – second place	2023 Santiago	Team foil
Bronze medal – third place	2019 Lima	Individual foil
Bronze medal – third place	2019 Lima	Team foil
Pan American Championships
Silver medal – second place	2022 Asuncion	Individual foil
Silver medal – second place	2022 Asuncion	Team foil
Silver medal – second place	2018 Havana	Individual foil
Bronze medal – third place	2024 Lima	Team foil
Bronze medal – third place	2016 Panama City	Team foil
Bronze medal – third place	2015 Santiago	Team foil
Bronze medal – third place	2013 Cartagena	Individual foil

Maximilien Van Haaster (born June 19, 1992) is a male foil fencer from Canada. He won the bronze medal at the 2013 Pan American Fencing Championships in Cartagena, and later competed at the 2015 Pan American Games, in Toronto, Ontario.

== Career ==
Van Haaster qualified to represent his country at the 2016 Summer Olympics, by being ranked in the top two in the Americas. At the games, Van Haaster finished in 31st place. Van Haaster competed at the 2020 Summer Olympics in the men's individual and team events. Van Haaster has qualified to compete in the men's individual and team events at the 2024 Summer Olympics.

== Personal life ==
Van Haaster was born in Canada to a Dutch father and Chinese mother.

== See also ==
- List of Canadian sports personalities
