= Fencing at the 2022 South American Games =

Fencing competitions at the 2022 South American Games

- Venue: Federación Paraguaya de Tenis de Mesa
- Dates: October 2−7
- Nations: 11

Fencing competitions at the 2022 South American Games in Asunción, Paraguay were held between October 2 and 7, 2022 at the Federación Paraguaya de Tenis de Mesa.

== Schedule ==
The competition schedule is as follows:

F	Preliminary round & Final

Date Event	Sun 2	Mon 3	Tue 4	Wed 5	Thu 6	Fri 7
Men's individual épée			F			
Men's individual foil		F				
Men's individual sabre	F					
Men's team épée						F
Men's team foil					F	
Men's team sabre				F		
Women's individual épée		F				
Women's individual foil	F					
Women's individual sabre			F			
Women's team épée					F	
Women's team foil				F		
Women's team sabre						F

== Medal summary ==
=== Medal table ===
* Host nation (Paraguay)

Rank	Nation	Gold	Silver	Bronze	Total
1	Colombia	4	3	1	8
2	Brazil	3	2	6	11
3	Chile	2	1	2	5
4	Venezuela	1	3	5	9
5	Argentina	1	3	3	7
6	Peru	1	0	0	1
7	Panama	0	0	1	1
Totals (7 entries)		12	12	18	42

=== Medalists ===
==== Men ====
Event	Gold	Silver	Bronze
Individual épée	Jhon Édison Rodríguez; Colombia	Francisco Limardo; Venezuela	Alexandre Camargo; Brazil
Individual épée	Jhon Édison Rodríguez; Colombia	Francisco Limardo; Venezuela	Jesús Lugones; Argentina
Team épée	Colombia; Hernando Roa; Jhon Édison Rodríguez; Michael Lozano	Brazil; Alexandre Camargo; Athos Schwantes; Leopoldo Gubert Filho; Pedro Marostega	Venezuela; Francisco Limardo; Grabiel Lugo; Jesús Limardo; José Rodríguez
Individual foil	Augusto Servello; Argentina	Guilherme Toldo; Brazil	Antonio Leal; Venezuela
Individual foil	Augusto Servello; Argentina	Guilherme Toldo; Brazil	Leopoldo Alarcón; Chile
Team foil	Brazil; Guilherme Toldo; Henrique Marques; Paulo de Morais; Pedro Marostega	Argentina; Augusto Servello; Dante Cerquetti; Nicolás Marino; Santiago Lucchetti	Venezuela; Antonio Leal; César Aguirre; José Briceño
Individual sabre	Sebastián Cuéllar; Colombia	Eliécer Romero; Venezuela	José Quintero; Venezuela
Individual sabre	Sebastián Cuéllar; Colombia	Eliécer Romero; Venezuela	Manuel Bahamonde; Chile
Team sabre	Venezuela; Abraham Rodríguez; Christian Crespo; Eliécer Romero; José Quintero	Colombia; Luis Correa; Mario Palacios; Sebastián Cuéllar	Brazil; Bruno Pekelman; Enrico Pezzi; Fabio Salles; Pedro Marostega

==== Women ====
Event	Gold	Silver	Bronze
Individual épée	María Luisa Doig; Peru	Clara Isabel Di Tella; Argentina	Nathalie Moellhausen; Brazil
Individual épée	María Luisa Doig; Peru	Clara Isabel Di Tella; Argentina	Melisa Englert; Argentina
Team épée	Brazil; Amanda Simeão; Nathalie Moellhausen; Talia Calazans; Victoria Vizeu	Argentina; Clara Isabel Di Tella; Datev Nahapetyan; Melisa Englert; Tamara Chwojnik	Colombia; Alejandra Piedrahita; María Jaramillo; Oriana Tovar
Individual foil	Arantza Inostroza; Chile	Katina Proestakis; Chile	Bia Bulcão; Brazil
Individual foil	Arantza Inostroza; Chile	Katina Proestakis; Chile	Isis Giménez; Venezuela
Team foil	Chile; Arantza Inostroza; Katina Proestakis; Lisa Montecinos	Venezuela; Anabella Acurero; Hillary Avelleira; Isis Giménez; Miranda Celis	Brazil; Bia Bulcão; Daphne Calazans; Mariana Pistoia; Talia Calazans
Individual sabre	María Angélica Blanco; Colombia	Jessica Morales; Colombia	Karina Ávila; Brazil
Individual sabre	María Angélica Blanco; Colombia	Jessica Morales; Colombia	Eileen Grench; Panama
Team sabre	Brazil; Karina Ávila; Luana Pekelman; Pietra Chierighini; Talia Calazans	Colombia; Jessica Morales; Linda Klimavicius; María Angélica Blanco	Argentina; Candela Espinosa; María Perroni; María Macarena Morán; María Belén Pérez Maurice

== Participation ==
Eleven nations participated in fencing events of the 2022 South American Games.

- Argentina
- Bolivia
- Brazil
- Chile
- Colombia
- Ecuador
- Panama
- Paraguay
- Peru
- Uruguay
- Venezuela

== Results ==
=== Men's individual épée ===
Round of 16
(Brazil) Alexandre Camargo	15
(Bolivia) Marco Rojas	7
(Panama) Arturo Dorati	14
(Panama) José Eduardo Quiros	15
(Venezuela) Francisco Limardo	15
(Chile) Joaquín Bustos	12
(Paraguay) Merardo Bernal	12
(Colombia) Hernando Roa	15
(Chile) Pablo Núñez	15
(Paraguay) Hugo Cacace
(Argentina) Lucio Pérez	9
(Argentina) Jesús Lugones	15
(Brazil) Athos Schwantes	12
(Venezuela) Grabiel Lugo	15
(Bolivia) Guillermo García	1
(Colombia) Jhon Rodríguez	15

Quarterfinals
(Brazil) Alexandre Camargo	15
(Panama) José Eduardo Quiros	13
(Venezuela) Francisco Limardo	15
(Colombia) Hernando Roa	12
(Chile) Pablo Núñez	11
(Argentina) Jesús Lugones	15
(Venezuela) Grabiel Lugo	7
(Colombia) Jhon Rodríguez	15

Semifinals
(Brazil) Alexandre Camargo	9
(Venezuela) Francisco Limardo	10
(Argentina) Jesús Lugones	12
(Colombia) Jhon Rodríguez	15

Final
(Venezuela) Francisco Limardo	9
(Colombia) Jhon Rodríguez	15

=== Men's team épée ===
Quarterfinals
Colombia	45
Bolivia	19
Chile	45
Argentina	32
Brazil	45
Panama	30
Paraguay	21
Venezuela	39

Semifinals
Colombia	45
Chile	39
Brazil	40
Venezuela	37

Final
Colombia	45
Brazil	44
Bronze medal match
Chile	29
Venezuela	45

=== Men's individual foil ===
Round of 16
(Brazil) Guilherme Toldo	15
(Paraguay) Pablo Aguilar	2
(Peru) Isaac Ariza	13
(Brazil) Henrique Marques	15
(Chile) Leopoldo Alarcón	15
(Colombia) Miguel Grajales	7
(Bolivia) Álvaro García	5
(Colombia) Santiago Pachón	15
(Venezuela) César Aguirre	15
(Ecuador) Mathias Villacreses	8
(Chile) Juvenal Alarcón	8
(Argentina) Augusto Servello	10
(Argentina) Nicolás Marino	14
(Peru) Lucas Lutar	15
(Bolivia) Mateo Granda	7
(Venezuela) Antonio Leal	15

Quarterfinals
(Brazil) Guilherme Toldo	14
(Brazil) Henrique Marques	3
(Chile) Leopoldo Alarcón	15
(Colombia) Santiago Pachón	9
(Venezuela) César Aguirre	9
(Argentina) Augusto Servello	15
(Peru) Lucas Lutar	12
(Venezuela) Antonio Leal	15

Semifinals
(Brazil) Guilherme Toldo	15
(Chile) Leopoldo Alarcón	3
(Argentina) Augusto Servello	15
(Venezuela) Antonio Leal	12

Final
(Brazil) Guilherme Toldo	9
(Argentina) Augusto Servello	15

=== Men's team foil ===
Quarterfinals
Peru	45
Colombia	42
Venezuela	45
Bolivia	15
Paraguay	10
Brazil	40

Semifinals
Argentina	45
Peru	28
Venezuela	31
Brazil	45

Final
Argentina	42
Brazil	45
Bronze medal match
Peru	33
Venezuela	45

=== Men's individual sabre ===
Round of 16
(Paraguay) Pablo Martínez	5
(Brazil) Fabio Salles
(Venezuela) Eliecer Romero	15
(Uruguay) Juan Arias	4
(Bolivia) Mateo Rejas	2
(Argentina) Stefano Lucchetti	15
(Chile) Roberto Monsalva	15
(Bolivia) Julián Mayer	8
(Chile) Manuel Bahamonde	15
(Brazil) Bruno Pekelman	9
(Colombia) Mario Palacios	15
(Uruguay) Guillermo Maclean	13
(Paraguay) Franco Gallardo	W
(Colombia) Sebastián Cuellar

Quarterfinals
(Venezuela) José Quintero	15
(Brazil) Fabio Salles	8
(Venezuela) Eliecer Romero	15
(Argentina) Stefano Lucchetti	11
(Chile) Roberto Monsalva	14
(Chile) Manuel Bahamonde	15
(Colombia) Mario Palacios	14
(Colombia) Sebastián Cuellar	15

Semifinals
(Venezuela) José Quintero	13
(Venezuela) Eliecer Romero	15
(Chile) Manuel Bahamonde	13
(Colombia) Sebastián Cuellar	15

Final
(Venezuela) Eliecer Romero	10
(Colombia) Sebastián Cuellar	15

=== Men's team foil ===
Quarterfinals
Paraguay	19
Brazil	45
Chile	45
Argentina	41

Semifinals
Colombia	45
Brazil	34
Chile	31
Venezuela	45

Final
Colombia	38
Venezuela	44
Bronze medal match
Brazil	45
Chile	32

=== Women's individual épée ===
Round of 16
(Argentina) Clara Isabel Di Tella	15
(Bolivia) Luz Bustos	3
(Paraguay) Gabriela Viveros	15
(Colombia) Alejandra Piedrahita	7
(Brazil) Nathalie Moellhausen	15
(Panama) Alessandra Aicardi	12
(Colombia) María Jaramillo	11
(Brazil) Amanda Rodrigues	13
(Argentina) Melisa Englert	8
(Paraguay) Janine Alcaraz	7
(Chile) Bárbara García	8
(Venezuela) Lizze Asis	15
(Venezuela) María Martínez	11
(Chile) Paula Vasquez del Campo	15
(Uruguay) Bettina Alberti	5
(Peru) María Luisa Doig	15

Quarterfinals
(Argentina) Clara Isabel Di Tella	15
(Paraguay) Gabriela Viveros	8
(Brazil) Nathalie Moellhausen	15
(Brazil) Amanda Rodrigues	10
(Argentina) Melisa Englert	15
(Venezuela) Lizze Asis	14
(Chile) Paula Vasquez del Campo	2
(Peru) María Luisa Doig	15

Semifinals
(Argentina) Clara Isabel Di Tella	15
(Brazil) Nathalie Moellhausen	13
(Argentina) Melisa Englert	11
(Peru) María Luisa Doig	15

Final
(Argentina) Clara Isabel Di Tella	13
(Peru) María Luisa Doig	14

=== Women's team épée ===
Quarterfinals
Chile	45
Paraguay	41
Venezuela	33
Colombia	34
Bolivia	23
Brazil	45

Semifinals
Argentina	45
Chile	15
Colombia	26
Brazil	37

Final
Argentina	36
Brazil	45
Bronze medal match
Chile	29
Colombia	45

=== Women's individual foil ===
Round of 16
(Brazil) Bia Bulcão	15
(Paraguay) Luz Palacios	3
(Argentina) Flavia Mormandi	15
(Argentina) Lucía Ondarts	6
(Chile) Arantza Inostroza	15
(Bolivia) Erika Christie	6
(Bolivia) Constanza García	4
(Venezuela) Anabella Acurero	15
(Chile) Katina Proestakis	15
(Uruguay) Ana Olivera	7
(Colombia) Tatiana Prieto	12
(Brazil) Mariana Pistoia	15
(Colombia) Juliana Pineda	15
(Ecuador) Camila Ortiz	9
(Paraguay) María Gwynn	2
(Venezuela) Isis Giménez	15

Quarterfinals
(Brazil) Bia Bulcão	15
(Argentina) Flavia Mormandi	11
(Chile) Arantza Inostroza	15
(Venezuela) Anabella Acurero	10
(Chile) Katina Proestakis	15
(Brazil) Mariana Pistoia	12
(Colombia) Juliana Pineda	1
(Venezuela) Isis Giménez	15

Semifinals
(Brazil) Bia Bulcão	13
(Chile) Arantza Inostroza	15
(Chile) Katina Proestakis	15
(Venezuela) Isis Giménez	12

Final
(Chile) Arantza Inostroza	15
(Chile) Katina Proestakis	10

=== Women's team foil ===
Quarterfinals
Colombia	31
Argentina	45
Brazil	45
Bolivia	22

Semifinals
Chile	45
Argentina	33
Brazil	32
Venezuela	33

Final
Chile	45
Venezuela	30
Bronze medal match
Argentina	42
Brazil	43

=== Women's individual sabre ===
Round of 16
(Venezuela) Luismar Banezca	15
(Argentina) María Alicia Perroni	13
(Panama) Eileen Grench	15
(Bolivia) Camila Torrico	5
(Chile) Elizabeth Mayor	3
(Argentina) María Pérez	15
(Brazil) Karina Avila	15
(Paraguay) Amara Martínez	11
(Bolivia) Rafaela Bonadona	5
(Chile) Yolanda Muñoz	15
(Venezuela) Shia Rodríguez	6
(Brazil) Luana Pekelman	15
(Paraguay) María Ortiz	0
(Colombia) María Angélica Blanco	15

Quarterfinals
(Colombia) Jessica Morales	15
(Venezuela) Luismar Banezca	9
(Panama) Eileen Grench	15
(Argentina) María Pérez	12
(Brazil) Karina Avila	15
(Chile) Yolanda Muñoz	10
(Brazil) Luana Pekelman	5
(Colombia) María Angélica Blanco	15

Semifinals
(Colombia) Jessica Morales	15
(Panama) Eileen Grench	14
(Brazil) Karina Avila	13
(Colombia) María Angélica Blanco	15

Final
(Colombia) Jessica Morales	13
(Colombia) María Angélica Blanco	15

=== Women's team sabre ===
Quarterfinals
Paraguay	8
Venezuela	45

Semifinals
Colombia	45
Venezuela	44
Argentina	37
Brazil	45

Final
Colombia	40
Brazil	45
Bronze medal match
Venezuela	44
Argentina	45
