= Fencing at the 2023 Central American and Caribbean Games =

- Venue: Multigimnasio Don Bosco
- Location: (El Salvador) Soyapango
- Dates: 2–7 July

The fencing competition at the 2023 Central American and Caribbean Games will be held in Soyapango, El Salvador from 2 July to 7 July at the Multigimnasio Don Bosco.

== Medal table ==
* Host nation (El Salvador)

Rank	Nation	Gold	Silver	Bronze	Total
1	Venezuela (VEN)	4	4	4	12
2	Mexico (MEX)	3	2	4	9
3	Colombia (COL)	2	2	5	9
4	Cuba (CUB)	2	1	4	7
5	Puerto Rico (PUR)	1	1	1	3
6	Centro Caribe Sports (CCS)	0	1	0	1
6	Dominican Republic (DOM)	0	1	0	1
Totals (7 entries)		12	12	18	42

== Medal summary ==
=== Men's events ===
Event	Gold	Silver	Bronze
Individual épée	Jhon Édison Rodríguez; Colombia	Grabiel Lugo; Venezuela	Pablo Florido; Mexico
Individual épée	Jhon Édison Rodríguez; Colombia	Grabiel Lugo; Venezuela	Francisco Limardo; Venezuela
Team épée	Venezuela; Grabiel Lugo; Jesús Limardo; Rubén Limardo; Francisco Limardo	Colombia; Hernando Roa; Jhon Édison Rodríguez; Juan Andres Castillo; David Ospina	Cuba; Yordan Ferrer; Dariel Carrion; Ringo Quintero; Hansel Rodriguez
Individual foil	Diego Cervantes; Mexico	Cristian Porras; Centro Caribe Sports	Tommaso Archilei; Mexico
Individual foil	Diego Cervantes; Mexico	Cristian Porras; Centro Caribe Sports	Antonio Leal; Venezuela
Team foil	Puerto Rico; Cesar Colon; Carlos Padua; Jonathan Lugo; Rafael Western	Venezuela; Antonio Leal; Janderson Briceno; Cesar Aguirre; Jose Briceno	Colombia; Tomas Vargas; David Ospina; Juan Andres Castillo; Miguel Grajales
Individual sabre	Eliecer Romero; Venezuela	Rafael Western; Puerto Rico	Hansel Rodriguez; Cuba
Individual sabre	Eliecer Romero; Venezuela	Rafael Western; Puerto Rico	José Quintero; Venezuela
Team sabre	Venezuela; Eliecer Romero; José Quintero; Abraham Rodriguez; Hender Medina	Mexico; Brandon Romo; Julián Ayala; Josue Morales; Gibran Zea	Puerto Rico; Rafael Western; Adrian Figueredo; Jonathan Lugo; Dylan Woodward

=== Women's events ===
Event	Gold	Silver	Bronze
Individual épée	Carmen Correa; Colombia	Yania Gavilan; Cuba	Maria Morales; Mexico
Individual épée	Carmen Correa; Colombia	Yania Gavilan; Cuba	Lizze Asis; Venezuela
Team épée	Venezuela; Eliana Lugo; María Martínez; Victoria Guerrero; Lizze Asis	Mexico; Maria Ramirez; Frania Tejeda; Sheila Tejeda; Maria Morales	Cuba; Seily Mendoza; Jiselle Franco; Yunaisi Montero; Yania Gavilan
Individual foil	Denisse Hernandez; Mexico	Anabella Acurero; Venezuela	Tatiana Prieto; Colombia
Individual foil	Denisse Hernandez; Mexico	Anabella Acurero; Venezuela	Laura Guerra; Colombia
Team foil	Mexico; Nataly Michel; Denisse Hernandez; Melissa Rebolledo; Victoria Meza	Venezuela; Hillary Avelleira; Anabella Acurero; Isis Giménez; Liz Rivero	Colombia; Tatiana Prieto; Laura Guerra; Ana Gonzalez; Juliana Pineda
Individual sabre	Leidis Veranes; Cuba	Jessica Morales; Colombia	Narianna Portuondo; Cuba
Individual sabre	Leidis Veranes; Cuba	Jessica Morales; Colombia	Maria Blanco; Colombia
Team sabre	Cuba; Leidis Veranes; Narianna Portuondo; Orquidea Ferrer; Elizabeth Hidalgo	Dominican Republic; Maiber De La Cruz; Heyddys Ysabel; Rossy Felix; Deyanara Matos	Mexico; Regina Pedraza; Julieta Toledo; Natalia Botello; Diana Gonzalez
