= Fencing at the 2018 Central American and Caribbean Games =

- Venue: Centro Eventos Puerta de Oro
- Location: (Colombia) Barranquilla
- Dates: 28 July – 2 August

The fencing competition at the 2018 Central American and Caribbean Games was held in Barranquilla, Colombia from 28 July to 2 August at the Centro Eventos Puerta de Oro.

== Medal summary ==
=== Men's events ===
Event	Gold	Silver	Bronze
Épée	Reynier Henrique (CUB)	Francisco Limardo (VEN)	Gustavo Coqueco (COL); Yunior Reytor (CUB)
Foil	Michael Carty (CUB)	Daniel Sconzo (COL)	Humberto Aguilera (CUB); Sebastián Tirado (PUR)
Sabre	José Quintero (VEN)	Eliécer Romero (VEN)	Luis Correa (COL); Sebastián Cuellar (COL)
Team Épée	Venezuela (VEN); Francisco Limardo; Jesús Limardo; Grabiel Lugo	Colombia (COL); Andrés Campos; Gustavo Coqueco; Santiago Pachón; Jhon Édison Rodríguez	Cuba (CUB); Reynier Henrique; Ringo Quintero; Yunior Reytor; Harold Rodríguez
Team Foil	Cuba (CUB); Humberto Aguilera; Michael Carty; Rubén Jay; Yunior Reytor	Mexico (MEX); Raúl Arizaga; Jesús Beltrán; Jorge Díaz; Juan Unda	Colombia (COL); Dimitri Clairet; Sebastián Cuellar; Santiago Pachón; Daniel Sconzo
Team Sabre	Venezuela (VEN); Johan Mora; José Quintero; Abraham Rodríguez; Eliécer Romero	Colombia (COL); Dimitri Clairet; Luis Correa; Sebastián Cuellar; Pablo Tróchez	Mexico (MEX); Adrián Acuña; Raúl Arizaga; Julián Ayala; Brandon Romo

=== Women's events ===
Event	Gold	Silver	Bronze
Épée	Seily Mendoza (CUB)	Caitlin Chang (JAM)	María Martínez (VEN); Violeta Ramírez (DOM)
Foil	Saskia van Erven (COL)	Nataly Michel (MEX)	Anabella Acurero (VEN); Isis Giménez (VEN)
Sabre	Leidis Veranes (CUB)	Eileen Grench (PAN)	Rossy Felix (DOM); Milagros Pastrán (VEN)
Team Épée	Cuba (CUB); Yania Gavilán; Seily Mendoza; Daylen Moreno; Yamirka Rodríguez	Venezuela (VEN); Yohana Fuenmayor; Eliana Lugo; María Martínez; Patrizia Piovezan	Mexico (MEX); Joselyn Cruz; Nataly Michel; María Ramírez; Alejandra Terán
Team Foil	Cuba (CUB); Elizabeth Hidalgo; Daylen Moreno; Elisa Tamayo; Leidis Veranes	Venezuela (VEN); Anabella Acurero; Yohana Fuenmayor; Isis Giménez; Patrizia Piovezan	Mexico (MEX); Lydia Casillas; Nataly Michel; Melissa Rebolledo; Alejandra Terán
Team Sabre	Venezuela (VEN); Isis Giménez; Milagros Pastrán; Shia Rodríguez; Jornely Velasquez	Colombia (COL); Linda González; Linda Klimavicius; Natalia Lozano; Jessica Morales	Cuba (CUB); Yaritza Goulet; Seily Mendoza; Darlin Robert; Leidis Veranes

== Medal table ==
* Host nation (Colombia)

Rank	Nation	Gold	Silver	Bronze	Total
1	Cuba (CUB)	7	0	4	11
2	Venezuela (VEN)	4	4	4	12
3	Colombia (COL)*	1	4	4	9
4	Mexico (MEX)	0	2	3	5
5	Jamaica (JAM)	0	1	0	1
5	Panama (PAN)	0	1	0	1
7	Dominican Republic (DOM)	0	0	2	2
8	Puerto Rico (PUR)	0	0	1	1
Totals (8 entries)		12	12	18	42
