= Fencing at the 2022 Bolivarian Games =

Fencing competitions at the 2022 Bolivarian Games

- Fencing pictogram
- Venue: Club Campestre
- Dates: 23–28 June 2022
- Competitors: 114 from 9 nations

Champions
- Venezuela (5 gold, 6 silver, 4 bronze)

Fencing competitions at the 2022 Bolivarian Games in Valledupar, Colombia were held from 23 (the day before the opening ceremony) to 28 June 2022 at the Gran Salón of the Club Campestre.

Twelve medal events were scheduled to be contested in the three disciplines of épée, foil and sabre. In each discipline an individual and a team event were held for each gender. A total of 114 athletes (57 per gender) competed in the events. The events were open competitions without age restrictions.

Venezuela were the fencing competitions defending champions having won them in the previous edition in Santa Marta 2017. Venezuela and hosts Colombia won 5 gold medals each, however Venezuela reached two more silver medals (6–4) than Colombia to win the Bolivarian fencing competitions again.

== Participating nations ==
A total of 9 nations (all the 7 ODEBO nations and 2 invited) registered athletes for the fencing events. Each nation was able to enter a maximum of 24 athletes (12 per gender). Each nation could register a maximum of two athletes for the individual events and a team composed by a maximum of four athletes for the team events.

- Bolivia (15 athletes)
- Chile (18)
- Colombia (24)
- Ecuador (6)
- Dominican Republic (6)
- Panama (6)
- Paraguay (6)
- Peru (9)
- Venezuela (24)

== Venue ==
The fencing events were held at the Gran Salón of the Club Campestre located near the Balneario Hurtado in the north of Valledupar. The venue has a capacity for 500 people.

== Medal summary ==
=== Medal table ===
* Host nation (Host nation)

Rank	Nation	Gold	Silver	Bronze	Total
1	Venezuela	5	6	4	15
2	Colombia*	5	4	3	12
3	Peru	1	1	1	3
4	Chile	1	0	8	9
5	Dominican Republic	0	1	1	2
6	Paraguay	0	0	1	1
Totals (6 entries)		12	12	18	42

Source: Bolivarianos Valledupar 2022 – Fencing medals

=== Men's events ===
Event	Gold	Silver	Bronze
Individual épée	Grabiel Lugo; Venezuela	Jhon Édison Rodríguez; Colombia	Rubén Limardo; Venezuela
Individual épée	Grabiel Lugo; Venezuela	Jhon Édison Rodríguez; Colombia	Eduardo García Biel; Peru
Team épée	Venezuela (VEN); Francisco Limardo; Jesús Limardo; Rubén Limardo; Grabiel Lugo	Colombia (COL); Mario Cáceres; Juan Castillo; Hernando Roa; Jhon Édison Rodríguez	Chile (CHI); Joaquín Bustos; Rodrigo González; Pablo Núñez
Individual foil	Lucas Lutar; Peru	Antonio Leal; Venezuela	Gustavo Alarcón; Chile
Individual foil	Lucas Lutar; Peru	Antonio Leal; Venezuela	Santiago Pachón; Colombia
Team foil	Colombia (COL); David Ospina; Jorge Murillo; Miguel Ángel Grajales; Santiago Pachón	Venezuela (VEN); Antonio Leal; César Aguirre; Janderson Briceño; José Briceño	Chile (CHI); Gustavo Alarcón; Juvenal Alarcón; Leopoldo Alarcón
Individual sabre	José Quintero; Venezuela	Mario Palacios; Colombia	Sebastián Cuellar; Colombia
Individual sabre	José Quintero; Venezuela	Mario Palacios; Colombia	Eliecer Romero; Venezuela
Team sabre	Colombia (COL); Luis Enrique Correa; Sebastián Cuéllar; Edwin González; Mario Palacios	Venezuela (VEN); Hender Medina; José Quintero; Abraham Rodríguez; Eliecer Romero	Chile (CHI); Ricardo Álvarez; Manuel Bahamonde; Joaquín De La Parra

=== Women's events ===
Event	Gold	Silver	Bronze
Individual épée	María de los Ángeles Jaramillo; Colombia	María Luisa Doig; Peru	Gabriela Viveros; Paraguay
Individual épée	María de los Ángeles Jaramillo; Colombia	María Luisa Doig; Peru	Lizze Asis; Venezuela
Team épée	Venezuela (VEN); Clarismar Farías; Eliana Lugo; Lizze Asis; Gabriela Martínez	Colombia (COL); Alejandra Piedrahita; María de los Ángeles Jaramillo; Oriana Tovar; Valentina Triana	Chile (CHI); Bárbara García; Paula Vásquez; Rosario Díaz Del Río
Individual foil	Katina Proestakis; Chile	Anabella Acurero; Venezuela	Isis Giménez; Venezuela
Individual foil	Katina Proestakis; Chile	Anabella Acurero; Venezuela	Arantza Inostroza; Chile
Team foil	Colombia (COL); María José Figueredo; Laura Guerra; Juliana Valencia; Tatiana Prieto	Venezuela (VEN); Anabella Acurero; Hillary Avelleira; Miranda Celis; Isis Giménez	Chile (CHI); Arantza Inostroza; Lisa Montecinos; Katina Proestakis
Individual sabre	Shia Rodríguez; Venezuela	Heyddys Valentín; Dominican Republic	María Angélica Blanco; Colombia
Individual sabre	Shia Rodríguez; Venezuela	Heyddys Valentín; Dominican Republic	Yolanda Muñoz; Chile
Team sabre	Colombia (COL); María Angélica Blanco; Linda González; Linda Klimavicius; Jessica Morales	Venezuela (VEN); Luismar Banezca; Katherine Paredes; Shia Rodríguez; Fabianggela Ruido	Dominican Republic (DOM); Maiber de la Cruz; Melody Martínez; Elsa Mateo; Heyddys Valentín
