= Venezuela at the 2016 Summer Olympics =

- IOC code: VEN
- NOC: Venezuelan Olympic Committee
- Website: cov.com.ve (in Spanish)

in Rio de Janeiro
- Competitors: 87 in 20 sports
- Flag bearer: Rubén Limardo
- Medals Ranked 65th: Gold 0 Silver 2 Bronze 1 Total 3

Summer Olympics appearances (overview)
- 1948; 1952; 1956; 1960; 1964; 1968; 1972; 1976; 1980; 1984; 1988; 1992; 1996; 2000; 2004; 2008; 2012; 2016; 2020; 2024; 2028

Venezuela competed at the 2016 Summer Olympics in Rio de Janeiro, Brazil, from 5 to 21 August 2016. It was the nation's eighteenth consecutive appearance at the Summer Olympics.

The Venezuelan Olympic Committee (Spanish: Comité Olímpico Venezolano, COV) fielded a team of 87 athletes, 62 men and 25 women, to compete in twenty sports at the Games. It was the nation's second-largest delegation sent to the Olympics, falling short of the record set in Beijing 2008 (108) by nearly twenty percent. Men's basketball was the only team-based sport in which Venezuela qualified for the Games, returning to the Olympic basketball for the first time since 1992. Venezuela also made its debut in golf (new to the 2016 Games) and women's beach volleyball, as well as its return to equestrian, rowing, and taekwondo events after eight years.

The Venezuelan roster featured 28 returning Olympians, with fencers Silvio Fernández and Alejandra Benítez, along with multiple-stroke swimmer Albert Subirats, headed to their fourth Games as the most experienced competitors of the team. Other notable Venezuelan athletes included artistic gymnast Jessica López, amateur welterweight boxer and Pan American Games champion Gabriel Maestre, 2015 world BMX champion Stefany Hernández, and fencing brothers Francisco and Rubén Limardo, who became the nation's first gold medalist since 1968 at the previous Games. Looking to defend his men's épée title in Rio de Janeiro, the elder Limardo was selected by the public through a nationwide online vote to carry the Venezuelan flag at the opening ceremony, the first male from his country to do so since 2004.

Unlike the previous Games, Venezuela failed to produce another gold medal-winning feat in Rio de Janeiro, but left instead with three medals (one silver and two bronze), which matched its overall tally from the 1984 Summer Olympics in Los Angeles. These medals were awarded to the following athletes for the first time in their respective sporting events: a silver to triple jumper Yulimar Rojas, and a bronze each to Hernández and flyweight boxer Yoel Finol. Finol would later be upgraded from bronze to silver after Russian boxer Misha Aloyan was disqualified.

== Medalists ==
Medal	Name	Sport	Event	Date
Silver	Yulimar Rojas	Athletics	Women's triple jump	14 August
Silver	Yoel Finol	Boxing	Men's flyweight	19 August
Bronze	Stefany Hernández	Cycling	Women's BMX	19 August

Medals by sport
Sport	1st place, gold medalist(s)	2nd place, silver medalist(s)	3rd place, bronze medalist(s)	Total
Athletics	0	1	0	1
Boxing	0	1	0	1
Cycling	0	0	1	1
Total	0	2	1	3

== Competitors ==
Sport	Men	Women	Total
Archery	1	1	2
Athletics	9	6	15
Basketball	12	0	12
Boxing	8	0	8
Cycling	6	3	9
Diving	2	0	2
Equestrian	2	0	2
Fencing	5	2	7
Golf	1	0	1
Gymnastics	0	1	1
Judo	0	1	1
Rowing	1	0	1
Sailing	2	0	2
Shooting	1	0	1
Swimming	4	2	6
Table tennis	0	1	1
Taekwondo	1	0	1
Volleyball	0	2	2
Weightlifting	1	3	4
Wrestling	6	3	9
Total	62	25	87

== Archery ==
One Venezuelan archer qualified for the men's individual recurve by obtaining one of the eight Olympic places available from the 2015 World Archery Championships in Copenhagen, Denmark. Meanwhile, another Venezuelan archer has been added to the squad by securing one of three available Olympic spots in the women's individual recurve at the Pan American Qualification Tournament in Medellín, Colombia.

Athlete	Event	Ranking round		Round of 64	Round of 32	Round of 16	Quarterfinals	Semifinals	Final / BM	
Athlete	Event	Score	Seed	Opposition Score	Opposition Score	Opposition Score	Opposition Score	Opposition Score	Opposition Score	Rank
Elías Malavé	Men's individual	651	46	Wang Dp (CHN); W 6–2	Worth (AUS); L 4–6	did not advance				
Leidys Brito	Women's individual	614	44	Unruh (GER); L 4–6	did not advance					

== Athletics (track and field) ==
Venezuelan athletes have so far achieved qualifying standards in the following athletics events (up to a maximum of 3 athletes in each event):

Key

- Note–Ranks given for track events are within the athlete's heat only
- Q = Qualified for the next round
- q = Qualified for the next round as a fastest loser or, in field events, by position without achieving the qualifying target
- NR = National record
- N/A = Round not applicable for the event
- Bye = Athlete not required to compete in round
- NM = No mark

Track & road events
Men

Athlete	Event	Heat		Semifinal		Final	
Athlete	Event	Result	Rank	Result	Rank	Result	Rank
Alberth Bravo	400 m	46.15	6	did not advance			
Luis Orta	Marathon	—N/a				2:27:05	106
Jose Peña	3000 m steeplechase	8:32.38	9	—N/a		did not advance	
Yerenman Salazar	50 km walk	—N/a				DNF	
Richard Vargas	20 km walk	—N/a				1:22:23	24
Alberth Bravo; Omar Longart; José Meléndez; Freddy Mezones; Arturo Ramírez	4 × 400 m relay	3:02.69	6	—N/a		Did not advance	

Women

Athlete	Event	Heat		Semifinal		Final	
Athlete	Event	Result	Rank	Result	Rank	Result	Rank
Yolimar Pineda	Marathon	—N/a				2:47:34	93
Nercely Soto	200 m	22.89	2 Q	22.88	7	did not advance	

Field events

Athlete	Event	Qualification		Final	
Athlete	Event	Distance	Position	Distance	Position
Ahymara Espinoza	Women's shot put	17.27	19	did not advance	
Robeilys Peinado	Women's pole vault	DNS		did not advance	
Rosa Rodríguez	Women's hammer throw	72.41	3 Q	69.26	10
Yulimar Rojas	Triple jump	14.21	7 Q	14.98	2nd place, silver medalist(s)

== Basketball ==
=== Men's tournament ===
Venezuela men's basketball team qualified for the Olympics by attaining a top two finish towards the final match of the 2015 FIBA Americas Championship in Mexico.

Team roster

The following is the Venezuela roster for the men's basketball tournament of the 2016 Summer Olympics.

Venezuela men's national basketball team – 2016 Summer Olympics roster
Players
Coaches

Pos.	No.	Name	Age – Date of birth	Height	Club	Ctr.
C	0	Gregory Echenique	25 – 23 November 1990	2.06 m (6 ft 9 in)	Guaros de Lara	(Venezuela)
G/F	2	Dwight Lewis	28 – 7 October 1987	1.97 m (6 ft 6 in)	Trotamundos de Carabobo	(Venezuela)
C	4	Miguel Marriaga	32 – 6 June 1984	2.06 m (6 ft 9 in)	Toros de Aragua	(Venezuela)
PG	5	Gregory Vargas	30 – 18 February 1986	1.80 m (5 ft 11 in)	Maccabi Haifa	(Israel)
SG	6	John Cox	35 – 7 June 1981	1.94 m (6 ft 4 in)	Bucaneros de La Guaira	(Venezuela)
PG	8	David Cubillán	29 – 27 July 1987	1.81 m (5 ft 11 in)	Trotamundos de Carabobo	(Venezuela)
G/F	10	José Vargas (C)	34 – 23 January 1982	1.95 m (6 ft 5 in)	Marinos de Anzoátegui	(Venezuela)
PF	14	Miguel Ruiz	25 – 20 December 1990	2.02 m (6 ft 8 in)	Trotamundos de Carabobo	(Venezuela)
F/C	15	Windi Graterol	29 – 10 September 1986	2.04 m (6 ft 8 in)	Guaros de Lara	(Venezuela)
PG	19	Heissler Guillént	29 – 17 December 1986	1.86 m (6 ft 1 in)	Guaros de Lara	(Venezuela)
F	23	Anthony Pérez	22 – 29 September 1993	2.05 m (6 ft 9 in)	Ole Miss Rebels	(United States)
PF	43	Néstor Colmenares	28 – 5 September 1987	2.03 m (6 ft 8 in)	Guaros de Lara	(Venezuela)

Head coach

- (Argentina) Néstor García

Assistant coach(es)

- (Venezuela) Nelson Solórzano
- (Venezuela) Daniel Seoane

Legend

- (C) Team captain
- Club – describes last
  club before the tournament
- Age – describes age
  on 6 August 2016

Group play

Pos	Team	Pld	W	L	PF	PA	PD	Pts	Qualification
1	United States	5	5	0	524	407	+117	10	Quarterfinals
2	Australia	5	4	1	444	368	+76	9	Quarterfinals
3	France	5	3	2	423	378	+45	8	Quarterfinals
4	Serbia	5	2	3	426	387	+39	7	Quarterfinals
5	Venezuela	5	1	4	315	444	−129	6	
6	China	5	0	5	318	466	−148	5	

Source: FIBA
Rules for classification: 1) points; 2) head-to-head points; 3) head-to-head points difference; 4) head-to-head number of points scored.

6 August 2016
22:30

Boxscore

Venezuela	62–86	Serbia
Scoring by quarter: 14–18, 9–26, 18–24, 21–18
Pts: Echenique 12; Rebs: Colmenares 6 Asts: Vargas 5		Pts: Bogdanović 19; Rebs: Štimac 9 Asts: Nedović 4

Carioca Arena 1, Rio de Janeiro
Attendance: 5,063
Referees: Christos Christodoulou (GRE), Duan Zhu (CHN), Roberto Vázquez (PUR)

8 August 2016
19:00

Boxscore

United States	113–69	Venezuela
Scoring by quarter: 18–18, 30–8, 27–25, 38–18
Pts: George 20; Rebs: Jordan 9 Asts: Lowry 9		Pts: Cox 19; Rebs: Echenique 7 Asts: Vargas 5

Carioca Arena 1, Rio de Janeiro
Attendance: 10,572
Referees: Eddie Viator (FRA), Damir Javor (SLO), Scott Beker (AUS)

10 August 2016
22:30

Boxscore

Venezuela	72–68	China
Scoring by quarter: 25–13, 13–22, 13–15, 21–18
Pts: Colmenares 16; Rebs: Colmenares 5 Asts: Vargas 5		Pts: Guo 17; Rebs: Yi 10; Asts: Guo, Zhou 3

Carioca Arena 1, Rio de Janeiro
Attendance: 6,223
Referees: Cristiano Maranho (BRA), Sreten Radović (CRO), Guilherme Locatelli (BRA)

12 August 2016
22:30

Boxscore

France	96–56	Venezuela
Scoring by quarter: 23–18, 19–12, 24–17, 30–9
Pts: Lauvergne 17; Rebs: Kahudi 12; Asts: Heurtel 8		Pts: Echenique 12; Rebs: Vargas 7 Asts: Cox 4

Carioca Arena 1, Rio de Janeiro
Attendance: 7,312
Referees: Cristiano Maranho (BRA), Robert Lottermoser (GER), Ferdinand Pascual (PHI)

14 August 2016
19:00

Boxscore

Australia	81–56	Venezuela
Scoring by quarter: 16–6, 16–19, 21–18, 28–13
Pts: Goulding 22; Rebs: Broekhoff 8 Asts: Martin 4		Pts: Perez 12; Rebs: Vargas, Ruiz 4 Asts: Vargas 7

Carioca Arena 1, Rio de Janeiro
Attendance: 9,459
Referees: Stephen Seibel (CAN), Sreten Radović (CRO), Carlos Peruga (ESP)

== Boxing ==
Venezuela has entered seven boxers to compete in each of the following weight classes into the Olympic boxing tournament. Luis Angel Cabrera, Luis Arcon, Albert Ramirez, and 2012 Olympian Gabriel Maestre had claimed their Olympic spots at the 2016 American Qualification Tournament in Buenos Aires. Meanwhile, Yoel Finol Rivas, Victor Rodríguez, Endry José Pinto, and Edgar Muñoz secured additional places on the Venezuelan roster at the 2016 APB and WSB Olympic Qualifier in Vargas.

Athlete	Event	Round of 32	Round of 16	Quarterfinals	Semifinals	Final	
Athlete	Event	Opposition Result	Opposition Result	Opposition Result	Opposition Result	Opposition Result	Rank
Yoel Finol Rivas	Men's flyweight	de los Santos (DOM); W 3–0	Ali (GBR); W 3–0	Flissi (ALG); W 3–0	Zoirov (UZB); L 0–3	Did not advance	2nd place, silver medalist(s)
Víctor Rodríguez	Men's bantamweight	Ham S-m (KOR); L 1–2	did not advance				
Luis Ángel Cabrera	Men's lightweight	Narimatsu (JPN); L 1–2	did not advance				
Luis Arcón	Men's light welterweight	Bachkov (ARM); L 1–2	did not advance				
Gabriel Maestre	Men's welterweight	Marutjan (GER); W 2–1	Mangiacapre (ITA); W WO	Yeleussinov (KAZ); L 0–3	did not advance		
Endry José Pinto	Men's middleweight	Delgado (ECU); L 0–3	did not advance				
Albert Ramírez	Men's light heavyweight	Khamukov (RUS); W 2–1	Benchabla (ALG); L 1–2	did not advance			
Edgar Muñoz	Men's super heavyweight	Jalolov (UZB); L TKO	did not advance				

== Cycling ==
=== Road ===
Venezuelan riders qualified for the following quota places in the men's Olympic road race by virtue of their top 5 national ranking in the 2015 UCI America Tour (for men), and top 22 in the 2016 UCI World Ranking (for women). One additional spot was awarded to the Venezuela cyclist in the women's road race, by virtue of a top national finish, not yet qualified, at the 2016 Pan American Championships.

Athlete	Event	Time	Rank
Jonathan Monsalve	Men's road race	did not finish	
Jonathan Monsalve	Men's time trial	did not finish	
Miguel Ubeto	Men's road race	did not finish	
Jennifer Cesar	Women's road race	4:03:18	50

=== Track ===
Following the completion of the 2016 UCI Track Cycling World Championships, Venezuelan riders have accumulated spots in the men's team sprint and women's omnium. As a result of their place in the men's team sprint, Venezuela has won the right to enter two riders in both men's sprint and men's keirin.

Sprint

Athlete	Event	Qualification		Round 1	Repechage 1	Round 2	Repechage 2	Quarterfinals	Semifinals	Final	
Athlete	Event	Time Speed (km/h)	Rank	Opposition Time Speed (km/h)	Opposition Time Speed (km/h)	Opposition Time Speed (km/h)	Opposition Time Speed (km/h)	Opposition Time Speed (km/h)	Opposition Time Speed (km/h)	Opposition Time Speed (km/h)	Rank
Hersony Canelón	Men's sprint	10.239; 70.319	24	did not advance							
César Marcano	Men's sprint	10.649; 67.611	27	did not advance							

Team sprint

Athlete	Event	Qualification		Semifinals		Final	
Athlete	Event	Time Speed (km/h)	Rank	Opposition Time Speed (km/h)	Rank	Opposition Time Speed (km/h)	Rank
Hersony Canelón; César Marcano; Ángel Pulgar	Men's team sprint	44.263; 60.999	8 Q	Great Britain; L 44.486; 60.693	8	did not advance	

Keirin

Athlete	Event	1st Round	Repechage	2nd Round	Final
Athlete	Event	Rank	Rank	Rank	Rank
Hersony Canelón	Men's keirin	7 R	5	did not advance	
Ángel Pulgar	Men's keirin	7 R	4	did not advance	

Omnium

Athlete	Event	Scratch race		Individual pursuit			Elimination race		Time trial			Flying lap			Points race		Total points	Rank
Athlete	Event	Rank	Points	Time	Rank	Points	Rank	Points	Time	Rank	Points	Time	Rank	Points	Points	Rank	Total points	Rank
Angie González	Women's omnium	18	6	3:47.161	17	8	12	18	36.535	12	18	14.660	16	10	1	13	61	18

=== BMX ===
Venezuelan riders qualified for one men's and one women's quota place for BMX at the Olympics, as a result of the nation's top three placement for men, not yet qualified, at the 2016 UCI BMX World Championships, and seventh-place finish for women in the UCI Olympic Ranking List of May 31, 2016. London 2012 Olympian Stefany Hernández and rookie Jefferson Milano were named to the Olympic roster on June 1, 2016.

Athlete	Event	Seeding		Quarterfinal		Semifinal		Final	
Athlete	Event	Result	Rank	Points	Rank	Points	Rank	Result	Rank
Jefferson Milano	Men's BMX	35.945	23	12	3 Q	24	8	did not advance	
Stefany Hernández	Women's BMX	35.202	4	—N/a		11	3 Q	34.755	3rd place, bronze medalist(s)

== Diving ==
Venezuelan divers qualified for two individual spots at the Olympics by virtue of a top 18 finish respectively at the 2016 FINA World Cup series.

Athlete	Event	Preliminaries		Semifinals		Final	
Athlete	Event	Points	Rank	Points	Rank	Points	Rank
Jesús Liranzo	Men's 10 m platform	385.55	21	did not advance			
Robert Páez	Men's 10 m platform	378.20	23	did not advance			

== Equestrian ==
Venezuela has entered two jumping riders into the Olympic equestrian competition by virtue of a top six individual finish at the 2015 Pan American Games.

=== Jumping ===
Athlete	Horse	Event	Qualification								Final					Total	
Athlete	Horse	Event	Round 1		Round 2			Round 3			Round A		Round B			Total	
Athlete	Horse	Event	Penalties	Rank	Penalties	Total	Rank	Penalties	Total	Rank	Penalties	Rank	Penalties	Total	Rank	Penalties	Rank
Emanuel Andrade	Hardrock	Individual	13	=61	Did not advance												
Pablo Barrios	Antares	Individual	8	=53 Q	12	20	54	Did not advance									

== Fencing ==
Venezuelan fencers have qualified a full squad each in the men's team épée by virtue of being the highest ranking team from America outside the world's top four in the FIE Olympic Team Rankings. Aiming to appear at fourth Olympics, Alejandra Benítez had claimed the spot on the Venezuelan team in the women's sabre as one of the two highest-ranked fencers coming from the America zone in the FIE Adjusted Official Rankings. Isis Giménez and 2011 Pan American Games bronze medalist Antonio Leal rounded out the Venezuelan fencing roster by finishing among the top two in the men's and women's foil, respectively, at the Pan American Zonal Qualifier in San José, Costa Rica.

Men

Athlete	Event	Round of 64	Round of 32	Round of 16	Quarterfinal	Semifinal	Final / BM	
Athlete	Event	Opposition Score	Opposition Score	Opposition Score	Opposition Score	Opposition Score	Opposition Score	Rank
Silvio Fernández	Épée	Jung J-s (KOR); L 8–15	did not advance					
Francisco Limardo	Épée	Ferreira (BRA); W 15–9	Jérent (FRA); W 15–14	Novosjolov (EST); L 12–15	did not advance			
Rubén Limardo	Épée	Bye	Fayez (EGY); L 5–15	did not advance				
Silvio Fernández; Francisco Limardo; Rubén Limardo; Kelvin Cañas*	Team épée	—N/a		Brazil; W 45–25	France; L 29–45	Classification semifinal South Korea; L 40–45	7th place final Russia; L 30–36	8
Antonio Leal	Foil	van Haaster (CAN); L 7–15	did not advance					

Women

Athlete	Event	Round of 64	Round of 32	Round of 16	Quarterfinal	Semifinal	Final / BM	
Athlete	Event	Opposition Score	Opposition Score	Opposition Score	Opposition Score	Opposition Score	Opposition Score	Rank
Isis Giménez	Foil	Bye	Jeon H-s (KOR); L 8–10	did not advance				
Alejandra Benítez	Sabre	Hafez (EGY); W 15–11	Márton (HUN); L 14–15	did not advance				

== Golf ==
Venezuela has entered one golfer into the Olympic tournament. Jhonattan Vegas (world no. 240) qualified directly among the top 60 players for the men's event based on the IGF World Rankings as of July 11, 2016.

Athlete	Event	Round 1	Round 2	Round 3	Round 4	Total		
Athlete	Event	Score	Score	Score	Score	Score	Par	Rank
Jhonattan Vegas	Men's	72	76	71	70	289	5	=50

== Gymnastics ==
=== Artistic ===
Venezuela entered one artistic gymnast into the Olympic competition. Jessica López confirmed her third straight Olympic appearance by securing a spot in the women's apparatus and all-around events at the Olympic Test Event in Rio de Janeiro.

Women

Athlete	Event	Qualification						Final					
Athlete	Event	Apparatus				Total	Rank	Apparatus				Total	Rank
Athlete	Event	V	UB	BB	F	Total	Rank	V	UB	BB	F	Total	Rank
Jessica López	All-around	14.933	15.333 Q	13.933	12.733	56.932	13 Q	14.833	15.100	13.800	14.233	57.966	7
Jessica López	Uneven bars	—N/a	15.333	—N/a		15.333	7 Q	—N/a	15.333	—N/a		15.333	6

== Judo ==
Venezuela has qualified one judoka for the women's middleweight category (70 kg) at the Games. Elvismar Rodríguez earned a continental quota spot from the Pan American region, as the highest-ranked Venezuelan judoka outside of direct qualifying position in the IJF World Ranking List of May 30, 2016.

Athlete	Event	Round of 32	Round of 16	Quarterfinals	Semifinals	Repechage	Final / BM	
Athlete	Event	Opposition Result	Opposition Result	Opposition Result	Opposition Result	Opposition Result	Opposition Result	Rank
Elvismar Rodríguez	Women's −70 kg	Moreira (ANG); L 000–100	did not advance					

== Rowing ==
Venezuela has qualified one boat in the men's single sculls for the Games at the 2016 Latin American Continental Qualification Regatta in Valparaíso, Chile.

Athlete	Event	Heats		Repechage		Quarterfinals		Semifinals		Final	
Athlete	Event	Time	Rank	Time	Rank	Time	Rank	Time	Rank	Time	Rank
Jakson Vicent Monasterio	Men's single sculls	7:28.36	6 R	7:28.67	5 SE/F	Bye		7:50.56	2 FE	7:57.83	29

Qualification Legend: FA=Final A (medal); FB=Final B (non-medal); FC=Final C (non-medal); FD=Final D (non-medal); FE=Final E (non-medal); FF=Final F (non-medal); SA/B=Semifinals A/B; SC/D=Semifinals C/D; SE/F=Semifinals E/F; QF=Quarterfinals; R=Repechage

== Sailing ==
Venezuelan sailors have qualified one boat in each of the following classes through the individual fleet World Championships, and South American qualifying regattas.

Athlete	Event	Race													Net points	Final rank
Athlete	Event	1	2	3	4	5	6	7	8	9	10	11	12	M*	Net points	Final rank
Daniel Flores	Men's RS:X	18	22	26	20	11	33	34	~~37~~	32	DNF	23	25	EL	160	27
José Gutiérrez	Men's Laser	35	36	36	~~42~~	40	35	40	19	37	37	—N/a		EL	314	38

M = Medal race; EL = Eliminated – did not advance into the medal race

== Shooting ==
Venezuela has qualified one shooter to compete in the men's rifle events by virtue of his best finish at the 2015 Pan American Games, as long as he obtained a minimum qualifying score (MQS) by March 31, 2016.

Athlete	Event	Qualification		Final	
Athlete	Event	Points	Rank	Points	Rank
Julio Iemma	Men's 10 m air rifle	612.7	45	did not advance	
Julio Iemma	Men's 50 m rifle prone	621.5	22	did not advance	
Julio Iemma	Men's 50 m rifle 3 positions	1155	40	did not advance	

Qualification Legend: Q = Qualify for the next round; q = Qualify for the bronze medal (shotgun)

== Swimming ==
Venezuelan swimmers have so far achieved qualifying standards in the following events (up to a maximum of 2 swimmers in each event at the Olympic Qualifying Time (OQT), and potentially 1 at the Olympic Selection Time (OST)):

Athlete	Event	Heat		Semifinal		Final	
Athlete	Event	Time	Rank	Time	Rank	Time	Rank
Carlos Claverie	Men's 100 m breaststroke	1:01.13	30	did not advance			
Carlos Claverie	Men's 200 m breaststroke	2:10.35	14 Q	2:11.56	15	did not advance	
Erwin Maldonado	Men's 10 km open water	—N/a				1:54:33.6	21
Cristian Quintero	Men's 50 m freestyle	22.92	44	did not advance			
Cristian Quintero	Men's 100 m freestyle	49.25	34	did not advance			
Cristian Quintero	Men's 200 m freestyle	1:47.02	14 Q	1:48.00	16	did not advance	
Cristian Quintero	Men's 400 m freestyle	3:50.84	33	—N/a		did not advance	
Albert Subirats	Men's 100 m backstroke	55.44	31	did not advance			
Albert Subirats	Men's 100 m butterfly	53.23	29	did not advance			
Paola Pérez	Women's 10 km open water	—N/a				1:59:07.7	20
Andreina Pinto	Women's 400 m freestyle	4:08.34	16	—N/a		did not advance	
Andreina Pinto	Women's 800 m freestyle	8:30.92	12	—N/a		did not advance	
Andreina Pinto	Women's 200 m butterfly	2:10.60	23	did not advance			

== Table tennis ==
Venezuela has entered one athlete into the table tennis competition at the Games. Gremlins Arvelo secured the Olympic spot in the women's singles by virtue of her top six finish at the 2016 Latin American Qualification Tournament in Santiago, Chile.

Athlete	Event	Preliminary	Round 1	Round 2	Round 3	Round of 16	Quarterfinals	Semifinals	Final / BM	
Athlete	Event	Opposition Result	Opposition Result	Opposition Result	Opposition Result	Opposition Result	Opposition Result	Opposition Result	Opposition Result	Rank
Gremlis Arvelo	Women's singles	Bye	Zhang (USA); L 0–4	did not advance						

== Taekwondo ==
Venezuela entered one athlete into the taekwondo competition at the Olympics. Edgar Contreras secured a spot in the men's lightweight category (68 kg) by virtue of his top two finish at the 2016 Pan American Qualification Tournament in Aguascalientes, Mexico.

Athlete	Event	Round of 16	Quarterfinals	Semifinals	Repechage	Final / BM	
Athlete	Event	Opposition Result	Opposition Result	Opposition Result	Opposition Result	Opposition Result	Rank
Edgar Contreras	Men's −68 kg	Denisenko (RUS); L 2–12	did not advance		Tazegül (TUR); W 5–4 SUD	González (ESP); L 3–4	5

== Volleyball ==
=== Beach ===
Venezuela women's beach volleyball team qualified directly for the Olympics by winning the final match over Argentina at the 2016 CSV Continental Cup in Rosario.

Athlete	Event	Preliminary round	Standing	Round of 16	Quarterfinals	Semifinals	Final / BM	
Athlete	Event	Opposition Score	Standing	Opposition Score	Opposition Score	Opposition Score	Opposition Score	Rank
Norisbeth Agudo; Olaya Pérez	Women's	Pool F Meppelink – van Iersel (NED); L 0 – 2 (17–21, 11–21); Bawden – Clancy (AUS); L 0 – 2 (21–9, 21–14); Alfaro – Charles (CRC); W 2 – 0 (21–16, 21–19); Lucky Losers; Borger – Büthe (GER); L 0 – 2 (13–21, 8–21)	3	did not advance				

== Weightlifting ==
Venezuelan weightlifters have qualified three women's quota places for the Rio Olympics based on their combined team standing by points at the 2014 and 2015 IWF World Championships. Meanwhile, a single men's Olympic spot was added to the Venezuelan roster by virtue of his top 15 individual finish, among those who had not secured any quota places through the World or Pan American Championships, in the IWF World Rankings as of June 20, 2016. The place was awarded to Jesús López in the men's featherweight division (62 kg).

Athlete	Event	Snatch		Clean & Jerk		Total	Rank
Athlete	Event	Result	Rank	Result	Rank	Total	Rank
Jesús López	Men's −62 kg	125	7	—	—	125	DNF
Yusleidy Figueroa	Women's −58 kg	85	14	116	8	201	9
Yaniuska Espinosa	Women's +75 kg	121	5	152	7	273	7
Naryury Pérez	Women's +75 kg	117	8	~~145~~	DNF	117	DNF

== Wrestling ==
Venezuela has qualified a total of nine wrestlers for each of the following weight classes into the Olympic competition. Majority of Olympic berths were awarded to Venezuelan wrestlers, who progressed to the top two finals at the 2016 Pan American Qualification Tournament. Meanwhile, two further wrestlers had claimed the remaining Olympic slots to round out the Venezuelan roster at the initial meet of the World Qualification Tournament in Ulaanbaatar.

Key:

- VT – Victory by Fall.
- PP – Decision by Points – the loser with technical points.
- PO – Decision by Points – the loser without technical points.
- ST – Technical superiority – the loser without technical points and a margin of victory of at least 8 (Greco-Roman) or 10 (freestyle) points.

Men's freestyle

Athlete	Event	Qualification	Round of 16	Quarterfinal	Semifinal	Repechage 1	Repechage 2	Final / BM	
Athlete	Event	Opposition Result	Opposition Result	Opposition Result	Opposition Result	Opposition Result	Opposition Result	Opposition Result	Rank
Pedro Ceballos	−86 kg	Bye	Zaghloul (EGY); W 3–0 ^{PO}	Sadulaev (RUS); L 0–3 ^{PO}	Did not advance	Bye	Veréb (HUN); W 3–1 ^{PP}	Sharifov (AZE); L 1–3 ^{PP}	5
José Daniel Díaz	−97 kg	Bye	Ibragimov (KAZ); L 0–4 ^{ST}	did not advance					18

Men's Greco-Roman

Athlete	Event	Qualification	Round of 16	Quarterfinal	Semifinal	Repechage 1	Repechage 2	Final / BM	
Athlete	Event	Opposition Result	Opposition Result	Opposition Result	Opposition Result	Opposition Result	Opposition Result	Opposition Result	Rank
Raiber Rodríguez	−59 kg	Bye	Bayramov (AZE); L 0–4 ^{ST}	did not advance					18
Wuileixis Rivas	−66 kg	Bye	Norouzi (IRI); L 1–3 ^{PP}	did not advance					14
Luillys Pérez	−98 kg	Bye	Rezaei (IRI); L 0–4 ^{ST}	did not advance					17
Erwin Caraballo	−130 kg	Bye	Kayaalp (TUR); L 0–4 ^{ST}	did not advance		Bye	Shariati (AZE); L 0–4 ^{ST}	Did not advance	19

Women's freestyle

Athlete	Event	Qualification	Round of 16	Quarterfinal	Semifinal	Repechage 1	Repechage 2	Final / BM	
Athlete	Event	Opposition Result	Opposition Result	Opposition Result	Opposition Result	Opposition Result	Opposition Result	Opposition Result	Rank
Betzabeth Argüello	−53 kg	Bye	Essombe (CMR); W 5–0 ^{VT}	Prevolaraki (GRE); W 3–1 ^{PP}	Yoshida (JPN); L 0–3 ^{PO}	Bye		Synyshyn (AZE); L 1–3 ^{PP}	5
María Acosta	−69 kg	Bye	Mostafa (EGY); L 1–3 ^{PP}	did not advance					17
Jaramit Weffer	−75 kg	Bye	Ali (CMR); L 0–3 ^{PO}	did not advance					17

== See also ==
- Venezuela at the 2015 Pan American Games
- Venezuela at the 2016 Summer Paralympics
