= Fencing at the 2026 Central American and Caribbean Games =

- Venue: Centro Olímpico Juan Pablo Duarte
- Location: Santo Domingo, Dominican Republic
- Start date: 3 August 2026
- End date: 8 August 2026

The fencing competition at the 2026 Central American and Caribbean Games was held in Santo Domingo, Dominican Republic, from 3 to 8 August 2026 at the Centro Olímpico Juan Pablo Duarte.

== Participating nations ==
A total of 14 nations qualified athletes. The number of athletes a nation entered is in parentheses beside the name of the country.

- Colombia (12)
- Costa Rica (8)
- Cuba (18)
- Dominican Republic (23)
- El Salvador (17)
- Guatemala (13)
- Honduras (6)
- Jamaica (4)
- Mexico (18)
- Nicaragua (2)
- Panama (9)
- Puerto Rico (10)
- Venezuela (24)
- Virgin Islands (2)

== Medal table ==
* Host nation (Dominican Republic)

Rank	Nation	Gold	Silver	Bronze	Total
1	Mexico (MEX)	7	3	5	15
2	Venezuela (VEN)	3	7	4	14
3	Colombia (COL)	2	1	3	6
4	Puerto Rico (PUR)	0	1	3	4
5	Cuba (CUB)	0	0	1	1
5	Guatemala (GUA)	0	0	1	1
5	U.S. Virgin Islands (ISV)	0	0	1	1
Totals (7 entries)		12	12	18	42

== Medal summary ==
=== Men's events ===
Event	Gold	Silver	Bronze
Individual épée	Jhon Édison Rodríguez; Colombia	Grabiel Lugo; Venezuela	Kruz Schembri; U.S. Virgin Islands
Individual épée	Jhon Édison Rodríguez; Colombia	Grabiel Lugo; Venezuela	Hernando Roa; Colombia
Team épée	Colombia; Hernando Roa; Jhon Édison Rodríguez; Juan Castillo	Venezuela; Guiseppe Astorino; Jesús Limardo; Francisco Limardo; Grabiel Lugo; Janderson Briceño	Cuba; Iván Cuza; Roberto Cruz; Yordan Ferrer; Lekian Valdés
Individual foil	Máximo Azuela; Mexico	Diego Cervantes; Mexico	Cristian Porras; Guatemala
Individual foil	Máximo Azuela; Mexico	Diego Cervantes; Mexico	Tommaso Archilei; Mexico
Team foil	Mexico; Tommaso Archilei; Máximo Azuela; Diego Cervantes	Venezuela; César Aguirre; José Briceño; Janderson Briceño; Samuel Flores	Puerto Rico; Sebastián García; José Arnel Ortega; Marcos Cano
Individual sabre	Brandon Romo; Mexico	Simón Durán; Venezuela	Gibrán Zea; Mexico
Individual sabre	Brandon Romo; Mexico	Simón Durán; Venezuela	Eliécer Romero; Venezuela
Team sabre	Venezuela; Marcel Medina; Simón Durán; José Quintero; Eliécer Romero	Mexico; Gibrán Zea; Julián Ayala; Brandon Romo	Puerto Rico; Adrián Figueredo; Deven Mattoo; Rafael Western

=== Women's events ===
Event	Gold	Silver	Bronze
Individual épée	Frania Tejeda; Mexico	Lizze Asis; Venezuela	María Jaramillo; Colombia
Individual épée	Frania Tejeda; Mexico	Lizze Asis; Venezuela	María Ramírez; Mexico
Team épée	Venezuela; Eliana Lugo; Betyumil Posada; Lizze Asis; Clarismar Farías	Colombia; Carmen Correa; Isabella González; María Jaramillo	Mexico; Nataly Michel; Bárbara Ocegueda; María Ramírez; Frania Tejeda
Individual foil	Anabella Acurero; Venezuela	Jimena Torres; Mexico	Isis Giménez; Venezuela
Individual foil	Anabella Acurero; Venezuela	Jimena Torres; Mexico	Nataly Michel; Mexico
Team foil	Mexico; Georgina Morales; Jimena Torres; Nataly Michel; Natalia Botello	Venezuela; Isis Giménez; Bárbara Manrique; Hillary Avelleira; Anabella Acurero	Colombia; Dennis Quiroga; Laura Guerra; Tatiana Prieto
Individual sabre	Natalia Botello; Mexico	Gabriela Hwang; Puerto Rico	Andrea Moros; Venezuela
Individual sabre	Natalia Botello; Mexico	Gabriela Hwang; Puerto Rico	Katherine Paredes; Venezuela
Team sabre	Mexico; Diana González; Frine Vanessa Chávez; Natalia Botello; Jimena Torres	Venezuela; Andrea Moros; Yesimar Aponte; Katherine Paredes; Ariana Prieto	Puerto Rico; Sophia Báez; Gabriela Hwang; Aydil-Marie Colón
