= Dayana Martinez =

Venezuelan fencer

Personal information
- Full name: Dayana Martinez Hansen
- Born: 10 October 1986 (age 40) Ciudad Bolívar, Venezuela
- Height: 1.65 m (5 ft 5 in)
- Weight: 52 kg (115 lb)

Fencing career
- Sport: Fencing
- Weapon: Épée
- Hand: right-handed
- National coach: Gascon(VEN) Nopens(USA)
- Club: Schoolhouse Fencing
Medal record
Women's Fencing
Representing Venezuela
Tournoi Satellite
Gold medal – first place	2014 Kocaeli	Épée
Pan American Games
Silver medal – second place	2015 Toronto	Team Épée
Pan American Championships
Silver medal – second place	2014 San Jose	Team Épée
Silver medal – second place	2015 Santiago	Team Épée
Central American and Caribbean Games
Gold medal – first place	2010 Mayagüez	Team Épée
Silver medal – second place	2014 Veracruz	Team Épée
Silver medal – second place	2014 Veracruz	Team Foil
Bolivarian Games
Gold medal – first place	2013 Trujillo	Team Épée
South American Games
Silver medal – second place	2014 Santiago	Team Épée
Bronze medal – third place	2010 Medellin	Team Épée

Dayana Martinez is a Venezuelan épée fencer. She has competed in three FIE world championships: 2010 Paris, France, 2013 Budapest, Hungary, and 2014 Kazan, Russia. She earned her first individual world gold medal in women's épée at the 2014 satellite tournament in Kocaeli, Turkey.

== Family of Fencers ==
Fencing is a family sport for Dayana. She competes alongside her sister, two-time Olympian Maria Martinez, and her cousins: 2012 Men's Épée Olympic Champion Ruben Limardo and his younger brother, 2008 Olympian Francisco Limardo.

== Education ==
Dayana attended university in the United States and graduated with a Bachelor of Arts in Latin American Studies from Brigham Young University in 2013.
