= Fencing at the 2016 Summer Olympics – Men's team épée =

Men's team épée at the Games of the XXXI Olympiad
- Venue: Carioca Arena 3
- Date: 14 August 2016
- Competitors: 35 from 9 nations

Medalists
1st place, gold medalist(s)		Gauthier Grumier; Yannick Borel; Daniel Jérent; Jean-Michel Lucenay	France
2nd place, silver medalist(s)		Enrico Garozzo; Marco Fichera; Paolo Pizzo; Andrea Santarelli	Italy
3rd place, bronze medalist(s)		Géza Imre; Gábor Boczkó; András Rédli; Péter Somfai	Hungary

The men's team épée competition in fencing at the 2016 Summer Olympics in Rio de Janeiro was held on 14 August at the Carioca Arena 3.

== Schedule ==
All times are Brasília time (UTC−3)

Date	Time	Round
Sunday, 14 August 2016	09:00	Round of 16
Sunday, 14 August 2016	10:30	Quarter-finals
Sunday, 14 August 2016	12:00	Placement 5-8
Sunday, 14 August 2016	13:15	Semi-finals
Sunday, 14 August 2016	14:30	Placement 5-6
Sunday, 14 August 2016	14:30	Placement 7-8
Sunday, 14 August 2016	17:00	Bronze medal match
Sunday, 14 August 2016	18:30	Final

== Draw ==
=== Finals ===
Round of 16
Brazil	25
Venezuela	45

Quarter-finals
France	45
Venezuela	29
Hungary	45
South Korea	42
Italy	45
Switzerland	32
Russia	32
Ukraine	45

Semi-finals
France	45
Hungary	40
Italy	45
Ukraine	33

Finals
France	45
Italy	31
Third place
Hungary	39
Ukraine	37

=== Classification 5–8 ===
Placement 5–8
Venezuela	40
South Korea	45
Switzerland	45
Russia	28

Placement 5–6
South Korea	45
Switzerland	36
Placement 7–8
Venezuela	30
Russia	36

== Final classification ==
Rank	Team	Athlete
1st place, gold medalist(s)	France	Gauthier Grumier; Yannick Borel; Daniel Jérent; Jean-Michel Lucenay
2nd place, silver medalist(s)	Italy	Enrico Garozzo; Marco Fichera; Paolo Pizzo; Andrea Santarelli
3rd place, bronze medalist(s)	Hungary	Géza Imre; Gábor Boczkó; András Rédli; Péter Somfai
4	Ukraine	Bohdan Nikishyn; Dmytro Karyuchenko; Anatoliy Herey; Maksym Khvorost
5	South Korea	Park Sang-young; Park Kyoung-doo; Jung Jin-sun; Jung Seung-hwa
6	Switzerland	Benjamin Steffen; Max Heinzer; Fabian Kauter; Peer Borsky
7	Russia	Anton Avdeev; Vadim Anokhin; Pavel Sukhov; Sergey Khodos
8	Venezuela	Francisco Limardo; Silvio Fernández; Rubén Limardo; Kelvin Caña
9	Brazil	Guilherme Melaragno; Nicolas Ferreira; Athos Schwantes
