= Fencing at the 2014 Central American and Caribbean Games =

- Venue: USBI Xalapa
- Location: Veracruz, Mexico
- Dates: 15–20 November

The fencing competition at the 2014 Central American and Caribbean Games was held in Veracruz, Mexico.

The tournament was scheduled to be held from 15 to 20 November at the USBI Xalapa.

== Medal summary ==
=== Men's events ===
Event	Gold	Silver	Bronze
Épée	Francisco Limardo (VEN)	Silvio Fernández (VEN)	Ryan Rodriguez (MEX); Gustavo Coqueco (COL)
Foil	Daniel Gómez (MEX)	Raul Arizaga (MEX)	Jesus Riano (CUB); Luis Lopez (GUA)
Sabre	Hernán Jansen (VEN)	Eliecer Romero (VEN)	Rafael Western (DOM); Julián Ayala (MEX)
Team Épée	Venezuela (VEN); Rubén Limardo; Silvio Fernández; Francisco Limardo; Antonio Leal	Colombia (COL); Andres Campos Zarate; Gustavo Coqueco; Alejandro Hernández; Jhon Édison Rodríguez	Cuba (CUB); Fidel Ferret; Jesus Riano; Ringo Quintero; Yunior Reytor Venet
Team Foil	Venezuela (VEN); Antonio Leal; Victor Leon; Luis Nunez; Eliecer Romero	Mexico (MEX); Daniel Gómez; Raul Arizaga; Jesus Beltran Macias; Ryan Rodriguez	Guatemala (GUA); Jose Fernando Lopez; Luis Lopez; Francisco Yanes; Gerber Morales
Team Sabre	Venezuela (VEN); Eliecer Romero; Hernán Jansen; Jose Quintero; Luis Nunez	Mexico (MEX); Julián Ayala; Eduardo Lara Azueta; Adrian Acuna; Raul Arizaga	Cuba (CUB); Daylon Diaz; Yoandys Iriarte; Castor Montalvo; Riuben Jay

=== Women's events ===
Event	Gold	Silver	Bronze
Épée	Seily Mendoza (CUB)	Elsa Mateo (DOM)	Maria Martínez (VEN); Violeta Ramírez (DOM)
Foil	Saskia van Erven (COL)	Isis Giménez (VEN)	Denisse Hernández (MEX); Angela Winter (CUB)
Sabre	Eileen Grench (PAN)	Milagros Pastran (VEN)	Maria Pliego (MEX); Darlin Robert (CUB)
Team Épée	Cuba (CUB); Yamirka Rodriguez; Seily Mendoza; Marisol Ona Gil; Daylen Moreno	Venezuela (VEN); Maria Martínez; Patrizia Piovesan; Dayana Martinez; Joselina Pineda	Dominican Republic (DOM); Violeta Ramírez; Elsa Mateo; Elisa Bocchia; Heyddys Valentín
Team Foil	Mexico (MEX); Nataly Michel; Melissa Rebolledo Contreras; Denisse Hernandez; Alejandra Terán	Venezuela (VEN); Isis Giménez; Joselina Pineda; Patrizia Piovesan; Dayana Martínez	Cuba (CUB); Angela Winter; Elizabeth Hidalgo Herrera; Daylen Moreno; Seily Mendoza
Team Sabre	Mexico (MEX); Denisse Hernandez; Maria Paola Pliego; Úrsula González Zárate; Julieta Toledo	Dominican Republic (DOM); Rossy Félix; Melody Martínez; Heyddys Valentín; Elsa Mateo	Cuba (CUB); Angela Winter; Darlin Robert; Jennifer Morales; Yaritza Goulet

== Medal table ==
* Host nation (Mexico)

Rank	Nation	Gold	Silver	Bronze	Total
1	Venezuela (VEN)	5	6	1	12
2	Mexico (MEX)*	3	3	4	10
3	Cuba (CUB)	2	0	7	9
4	Colombia (COL)	1	1	1	3
5	Panama (PAN)	1	0	0	1
6	Dominican Republic (DOM)	0	2	3	5
7	Guatemala (GUA)	0	0	2	2
Totals (7 entries)		12	12	18	42
