= Fencing at the 2013 Bolivarian Games =

Fencing (Spanish: Esgrima), for the 2013 Bolivarian Games, took place from 18 November to 23 November 2013.

== Medal table ==
Key:

* Host nation (Peru)

Rank	Nation	Gold	Silver	Bronze	Total
1	Venezuela (VEN)	7	4	4	15
2	Colombia (COL)	3	3	4	10
3	Chile (CHI)	1	4	4	9
4	Dominican Republic (DOM)	1	1	2	4
5	El Salvador (ESA)	0	0	1	1
5	Guatemala (GUA)	0	0	1	1
5	Panama (PAN)	0	0	1	1
5	Peru (PER)*	0	0	1	1
Totals (8 entries)		12	12	18	42

== Medalists ==
Event	Gold	Silver	Bronze
Men's individual épée	Francisco Limardo (VEN)	Kelvin Cañas (VEN)	Jhon Édison Rodríguez (COL)
Men's individual épée	Francisco Limardo (VEN)	Kelvin Cañas (VEN)	Paris Inostrozo (CHI)
Men's team épée	Venezuela; Kelvin Cañas; Antonio Leal; Rubén Limardo; Geiser Tomoche	Chile; Paris Inostrozo; Heinz Nickel; Rolf Nickel	Colombia; Alejandro Hernández; Jhon Édison Rodríguez; Javier Orlando Suárez
Men's individual foil	Antonio Leal (VEN)	Felipe Alvear (CHI)	Alejandro Hernández (COL)
Men's individual foil	Antonio Leal (VEN)	Felipe Alvear (CHI)	Ruben Silva (CHI)
Men's team foil	Chile; Felipe Alvear; Pablo Alvear; Ruben Silva	Venezuela; César Aguirre; César Bru; Antonio Leal; Jhon Pérez	Guatemala; José Fernando López; Luis Alejandro López; Francisco Yanes
Men's individual sabre	Hernán Jansen (VEN)	Sebastian Cuellar (COL)	Eliecer Romero (VEN)
Men's individual sabre	Hernán Jansen (VEN)	Sebastian Cuellar (COL)	Rafael Western (DOM)
Men's team sabre	Venezuela; Jesus Carvajal; Hernán Jansen; Abrahan Rodriguez; Eliecer Romero	Colombia; Carlos Enrique Correa; Sebastian Cuellar; Juan Pablo Velasquez	Dominican Republic; Héctor David Castro; Rhandall Hernández; Luis Rodríguez; Rafael Western
Women's individual épée	Saskia Loretta van Erven Garcia (COL)	Maria Martinez (VEN)	María Luisa Doig (PER)
Women's individual épée	Saskia Loretta van Erven Garcia (COL)	Maria Martinez (VEN)	Laskmi Lozano (COL)
Women's team épée	Venezuela; Lizzie Assis; Dayana Martínez; Maria Martinez; Patricia Piovezan	Colombia; Laskmi Lozano; Diana Rodríguez; Saskia Loretta van Erven Garcia	Chile; Caterin Aranguiz; Rudy Alarcon; Pia Montecinos
Women's individual foil	Saskia Loretta van Erven Garcia (COL)	Paula Silva (CHI)	Bárbara García (CHI)
Women's individual foil	Saskia Loretta van Erven Garcia (COL)	Paula Silva (CHI)	Liz Rivero (VEN)
Women's team foil	Colombia; Diana Maritza Rodríguez Quevedo; Laskmi Natalia Lozano Olarte; Saskia Loretta van Erven Garcia; Juliana Velasquez Agudelo	Chile; Barbara Isabel Garcia Azua; Alejandra Muñoz; Paula Silva	Venezuela; Isis Jimenez; Geiglys Mendoza; Liz Rivero; Yulitza Suarez
Women's individual sabre	Rossy Félix (DOM)	María Blanco (VEN)	María Carreño (VEN)
Women's individual sabre	Rossy Félix (DOM)	María Blanco (VEN)	Eileen Grench (PAN)
Women's team sabre	Venezuela; María Blanco; Maria Carreño; Shia Rodríguez; Scarlet Suárez	Dominican Republic; Rossy Félix; Melody Martínez; Heyddys Valentín	El Salvador; Madeline Hernández; Fatima Tobar; Alba Marroquin
