= Fencing at the 2010 Central American and Caribbean Games =

- Venue: Coliseo Rebekah Colberg Cabrera
- Location: Mayagüez

Fencing competition at the 2010 Central American and Caribbean Games was being held in Mayagüez, Puerto Rico.

The tournament was scheduled to be held from 18 to 23 July at the Coliseo Rebekah Colberg Cabrera in Porta del Sol.

== Medal summary ==
=== Men's events ===
Event	Gold	Silver	Bronze
Épée	Silvio Fernández (VEN)	Rubén Limardo (VEN)	Omar Carrillo (MEX); Jose Lockhart (DOM)
Foil	Daniel Gómez (MEX)	Jonathan Lugo (PUR)	Ramses Herrera (MEX); Antonio Leal (VEN)
Sabre	Eliezer Rincones (VEN)	Carlos Bravo (VEN)	Alvaro Dorantes (MEX); Héctor Castro (DOM)
Team Épée	Venezuela (Silvio Fernández, Francisco Limardo, Rubén Limardo, Wolfang Mejias)	Mexico (Omar Carrillo, Aldo Del Toro, Gerardo Díaz, Arturo Semont)	Puerto Rico (Luis Díaz, Ketziel Estrada, Héctor Maisonet, Luis Ramos)
Team Foil	Venezuela (Cesar Bru, Antonio Leal, Jhon Pérez, Carlos Rodríguez)	Mexico (Raúl Arizaga, Daniel Gómez, David Gómez, Ramses Herrera)	Puerto Rico (Angelo Justiniano, Jonathan Lugo, Marcos Peña, Ángel Vásquez)
Team Sabre	Venezuela (Carlos Bravo, Eliezer Rincones, Abraham Rodríguez, Jose Sequera)	Mexico (Julián Ayala, Alberto Cortés, Álvaro Dorantes, Manuel Sánchez)	El Salvador (Gustavo Arias, Randolfo Campos, John López, Joaquin Tobar)

=== Women's events ===
Event	Gold	Silver	Bronze
Épée	Eliana Lugo (VEN)	Andrea Ezeta (MEX)	Violeta Ramírez (DOM); Maria Martínez (VEN)
Foil	Mariana González (VEN)	Nataly Michel (MEX)	Kristal Bas (PUR); Yulitza Suarez (VEN)
Sabre	Rossy Félix (DOM)	Melanie Mercado (PUR)	Eileen Grench (PAN); Úrsula González (MEX)
Team Épée	Venezuela (Aleska Aular, Eliana Lugo, Dayana Martínez, María Martínez)	Mexico (Alexandra Avena, Andrea Ezeta, Andrea Millán, Alejandra Terán)	Dominican Republic (Elsa Mateo, Violeta Ramírez, Elisa Segnini, Heyddys Valentín)
Team Foil	Venezuela (Johana Fuenmayor, Mariana González, Marianny Rincones, Yulitza Suarez)	Mexico (Getzemaní Delgado, Jessica Ferrer, Alely Hernández, Nataly Michel)	Puerto Rico (Kristal Bas, Karla Meléndez, Luisa Parrilla, Aslyn Zayas)
Team Sabre	Dominican Republic (Rossy Félix, Heyddys Valentín, Maybelline Johnson, Melody Martínez)	Venezuela (Alejandra Benítez, María Blanco, Grisel Daly, Nulexis González)	Mexico (Angélica Aguilar, Úrsula González, Angélica Larios, Giselle Martínez)
