= Fencing at the 2010 South American Games =

- Dates: March 24–29

There were 12 fencing events at the 2010 South American Games: 6 men's events and 6 women's events. The events were held over March 24–29.

== Medal summary ==
=== Medal table ===
Rank	Nation	Gold	Silver	Bronze	Total
1	Venezuela (VEN)	8	1	6	15
2	Brazil (BRA)	2	2	4	8
3	Colombia (COL)	2	0	1	3
4	Argentina (ARG)	0	6	4	10
5	Chile (CHI)	0	3	2	5
6	Peru (PER)	0	0	1	1
Totals (6 entries)		12	12	18	42

=== Medalists ===
Event	Gold	Silver	Bronze
Men's events
Men's individual épée	Rubén Limardo; Venezuela	Jose Felix Dominguez; Argentina	Paris Inostroza; Chile; Silvio Fernández; Venezuela
Men's team épée	Silvio Fernández; Francisco Limardo; Rubén Limardo; Wolfgang Mejías; Venezuela	Paris Inostroza; Luis Samuel Briones; Rolf Alegria; Chile	Lucio Goldani; Richard Grunhauser; Athos Schwantes; João Souza; Brazil
Men's individual foil	Carlos Rodríguez; Venezuela	Felipe Saucedo; Argentina	Heitor Shimbo; Brazil; Antonio Leal; Venezuela
Men's team foil	João Souza; Heitor Shimbo; Fernando Scavasin; Marcos Cardoso; Brazil	Felipe Zamora; Anibal Zamora; Ruben Quinteros; Pablo Cornejo; Chile	Felipe Saucedo; Alberto Viaggio; Ezequiel Navas; Federico Muller; Argentina
Men's individual sabre	Renzo Agresta; Brazil	Alexander Achten; Argentina	Carlos Bravo; Venezuela; Eliezer Rincones; Venezuela
Men's team sabre	Carlos Bravo; Eliezer Rincones; Mayerwing Rondon; Jose Sequera; Venezuela	Alexander Achten; Ricardo Bustamante; Guido Mulero; Alberto Ghersi; Argentina	Renzo Agresta; Tywilliam Guzenski; William Zeytounlian; Marcos Cardoso; Brazil
Women's events
Women's individual épée	Angela Maria Toro; Colombia	Cleia Guilhon; Brazil	Laskmi Lozano; Colombia; Maria Luisa Calderon; Peru
Women's team épée	Ana Maria Castrillon; Angela Maria Toro; Laskmi Lozano; Diana Quevedo; Colombia	Camila Barbosa; Silvia Rothfeld; Cleia Guilhon; Rayssa Costa; Brazil	Eliana Lugo; Maria Gabriela Martinez; Aleska Aular; Dayana Martinez; Venezuela
Women's individual foil	Mariana González; Venezuela	Yulitza Suarez; Venezuela	Alejandra Andrea Carbone; Argentina; Barbara Azua; Chile
Women's team foil	Yulitza Suarez; Marianny Rincones; Mariana González; Johana Fuenmayor; Venezuela	Paula Quinteros; Barbara Azua; Alejandra Gomez; Chile	Alejandra Carbone; Flavia Mormandi; Carla Damico; Argentina
Women's individual sabre	Alejandra Benítez; Venezuela	Estefania Berninsone; Argentina	Maria Belen Maurice; Argentina; Nulexis Gonzalez; Venezuela
Women's team sabre	Alejandra Benítez; Maria Blanco; Grisel Daly; Nulexis Gonzalez; Venezuela	Adriana Cohen; Maria Andrea Pajaro; Estefania Berninsone; Maria Belen Maurice; Argentina	Denise Fried; Karina Lakerbai; Clarissa Osorio; Brazil
