= Fencing at the 2011 Pan American Games – Women's team épée =

Women's team épée at the 2011 Pan American Games
- Venue: Multipurpose Gymnasium
- Dates: October 29
- Competitors: 30 from 8 nations

Medalists
Gold medal	Lindsay Campbell; Courtney Hurley; Kelley Hurley	United States
Silver medal	Sherraine Schalm; Ainsley Switzer; Sandra Sassine; Daria Jorqera	Canada
Bronze medal	Alexandra Avena; Andrea Millan; Alejandra Terán; Alely Hernandez	Mexico

The women's team épée competition of the fencing events at the 2011 Pan American Games in Guadalajara, Mexico, was held on October 29 at the Multipurpose Gymnasium. The defending champion was the team from Cuba.

The team épée competition consisted of a four-round single-elimination bracket with a bronze medal match between the two semifinal losers and classification semifinals and finals for 5th to 8th places. Teams consist of three members each. Matches consist of nine bouts, with every fencer on one team facing each fencer on the other team. Scoring carried over between bouts with a total of 45 touches being the team goal. Bouts lasted until one team reached the target multiple of 5 touches. For example, if the first bout ended with a score of 5–3, that score would remain into the next bout and the second bout would last until one team reached 10 touches. Bouts also had a maximum time of three minutes each; if the final bout ended before either team reached 45 touches, the team leading at that point won. A tie at that point would result in an additional one-minute sudden-death time period. This sudden-death period was further modified by the selection of a draw-winner beforehand; if neither fencer scored a touch during the minute, the predetermined draw-winner won the bout.

== Schedule ==
All times are Central Standard Time (UTC−6).

Date	Time	Round
October 29, 2011	8:30	Quarterfinals
October 29, 2011	10:10	Fifth to eighth
October 29, 2011	10:20	Semifinals
October 29, 2011	11:50	Seventh place
October 29, 2011	11:50	Fifth place
October 29, 2011	11:50	Bronze medal match
October 29, 2011	19:00	Final

== Draw ==
=== Finals ===
Quarterfinals
1	United States	45
8	Cuba	35
4	Argentina	39
5	Brazil	38
3	Mexico	45
6	Venezuela	28
7	Chile	35
2	Canada	45

Semifinals
1	United States	45
4	Argentina	17
3	Mexico	37
2	Canada	45

Final
1	United States	45
2	Canada	36
Third place
4	Argentina	32
3	Mexico	45

=== Classification 5 – 8 ===
Classification
8	Cuba	45
5	Brazil	35
6	Venezuela	45
7	Chile	31

Fifth place
8	Cuba	45
7	Chile	39
Seventh place
5	Brazil	45
6	Venezuela	43

== Final classification ==
Rank	Team	Athlete
1st place, gold medalist(s)	United States	Lindsay Campbell; Courtney Hurley; Kelley Hurley
2nd place, silver medalist(s)	Canada	Sherraine Schalm; Ainsley Switzer; Sandra Sassine; Daria Jorqera
3rd place, bronze medalist(s)	Mexico	Alexandra Avena; Andrea Millan; Alejandra Terán; Alely Hernandez
4	Argentina	Elida Aguero; Andrea Chiuchich; Isabel Di Tella; María Perez
5	Cuba	Seily Mendoza; Zuleydis Ortiz; Yamirka Rodriguez; Adriagne Rivot
6	Chile	Cáterin Bravo; Pía Montecinos; Maria Ramirez; Paula Silva
7	Brazil	Clarisse De Menezes; Rayssa De Oliveira; Amanda Simeão
8	Venezuela	Eliana Lugo; Maria Martinez; Patrizia Piovesan; Johana Fuenmayor
