= Anthony Perez =

Anthony Perez may refer to:

- Anthony Perez (cyclist) (born 1991), French cyclist
- Anthony Pérez (basketball) (born 1993), Venezuelan basketball player
