= Heyddys Valentín =

Dominican sabre and foil fencer

Personal information
- Born: 25 September 1991 (age 35) Santo Domingo, Dominican Republic
- Height: 1.62 m (5 ft 4 in)
- Weight: 63 kg (139 lb)

Fencing career
- Sport: Fencing
- Weapon: Épée, sabre
- Hand: right-handed
- FIE ranking: current ranking
Medal record
Women's Fencing
Representing Dominican Republic
Pan American Games
Silver medal – second place	2019 Lima	Team sabre
Central American and Caribbean Games
Gold medal – first place	2010 Mayagüez	Team sabre
Silver medal – second place	2014 Veracruz	Team sabre
Bronze medal – third place	2010 Mayagüez	Team épée
Bronze medal – third place	2014 Veracruz	Team épée
Bolivarian Games
Silver medal – second place	2013 Trujillo	team sabre
Silver medal – second place	2022 Valledupar	Individual sabre
Bronze medal – third place	2022 Valledupar	Team sabre

Heyddys Estibalys Ysabel Valentín (born September 25, 1991, in Santo Domingo, Dominican Republic) is a Dominican female fencer.

== Career ==
=== 2010 ===
Valentín won the gold medal in team Sabre during the Central American and Caribbean Games and the bronze in team Épée.

=== 2011 ===
She ended up in the fourth place during the Pan American Games in the team sabre competition, when they fall 44–45 to the Venezuelan team in the bronze medal match, having defeated Argentina 45–44 in the quarterfinals, before losing 12–45 to the United States.

=== 2013 ===
In March, Valentín shared the bronze medal of the Dominican Republic Women's Festival in sabre competition. She won the Bolivarian Games women's team sabre silver medal. At the Absolute Fencing Korfanty World Cup in Chicago, she helped her team to reach the team sabre fifteenth place.

=== 2014 ===
Valentín represented her home country during the Central American and Caribbean Games, winning the silver medal in Team Sabre after falling 41–45 to the Mexican team and bronze in Team Épée.

=== 2015 ===
She ranked twelfth in the Pan American Championships losing 10–15 to Mexican Paola Pliego in the round of 16, but qualified for the 2015 Pan American Games. At the Pan American Games held in Toronto, Canada, she took part in the omen's sabre competition, but lost 8–15 in the round of 16 to American Dagmara Wozniak placing twelfth and ranked seventh in the Fencing at the 2015 Pan American Games – Women's team sabre competition, losing 36–45 to the Venezuelan team in the quarterfinals and winning 45–29 to El Salvador in the 7/8 placement match.

=== 2017 ===
Valentín became Sabre national champión when she defeated 15–14 to Rossy Félix.

=== 2018 ===
In the round of 32 at the 2018 Pan American Fencing Championships, Valentín lost 7-15to American Dagmara Wozniak and ranked seventh in the team sabre competition.

=== 2019 ===
Valentín defeated 15–8 to compatriot Rossy Félix in the round of 16, also defeated Colombian lost 5–15 to Canadian Gabriella Page ending up in fifth place in the individual sabre competition and placed with her team eighth in the team competition falling 40–45 to the Venezuelan team in the quarterfinal round.

She won the team sabre silver medal and ranked ninth in the individual sabre during the Fencing at the 2019 Pan American Games. She took part in the sabre individual event, ranking fifth in the preliminary round, but lost 11–15 to Cuban Aymara Tablada.

=== 2021 ===
Valentín lost 5–15 to the Argentinian María Belén Pérez Maurice in the zonal tournament, winning the bronze medal but did not qualify for the 2020 Summer Olympics.

She received the Athlete of the Year award in Fencing by the Dominican Republic Olympic Committee.

=== 2022 ===
She traveled in April to Spain in order to train for the Central American and Caribbean Games.

Valentín won the individual sabre competition silver medal in the Bolivarian Games. She also took part of the team sabre competition, but finished last with her team after falling 26–45 to Venezuela and 36–45 to the Chilean team.
