= 2014 Pan American Fencing Championships =

The 2014 Pan American Fencing Championships were held in San José, Costa Rica from 1 June to 6 June 2014.

== Medal summary ==
=== Men's events ===
Event	Gold	Silver	Bronze
Foil	Gerek Meinhardt (USA)	Alexander Massialas (USA)	Guilherme Toldo (BRA); Felipe Guillermo Saucedo (ARG)
Épée	Francisco Limardo (VEN)	Nicolas Ferreira (BRA)	Kelvin Cañas (VEN); Jason Pryor (USA)
Sabre	Eli Dershwitz (USA)	Philippe Beaudry (CAN)	Daryl Homer (USA); Renzo Agresta (BRA)
Team Foil	United States	Canada	Brazil
Team Épée	Cuba	Canada	United States
Team Sabre	United States	Canada	Mexico

=== Women's events ===
Event	Gold	Silver	Bronze
Foil	Lee Kiefer (USA)	Kelleigh Ryan (CAN)	Nzingha Prescod (USA); Isis Giménez (VEN)
Épée	Courtney Hurley (USA)	Katharine Holmes (USA)	Anna Van Brummen (USA); Isabel Di Tella (ARG)
Sabre	María Belén Pérez Maurice (ARG)	Mariel Zagunis (USA)	Dagmara Wozniak (USA); Ibtihaj Muhammad (USA)
Team Foil	United States	Canada	Venezuela
Team Épée	United States	Venezuela	Brazil
Team Sabre	United States	Mexico	Argentina

=== Medal table ===
Rank	Nation	Gold	Silver	Bronze	Total
1	United States	9	3	7	19
2	Venezuela	1	1	3	5
3	Argentina	1	0	3	4
4	Cuba	1	0	0	1
5	Canada	0	6	1	7
6	Brazil	0	1	4	5
7	Mexico	0	1	1	2
Totals (7 entries)		12	12	19	43
