= Jhon Édison Rodríguez =

Colombian fencer (born 1991)

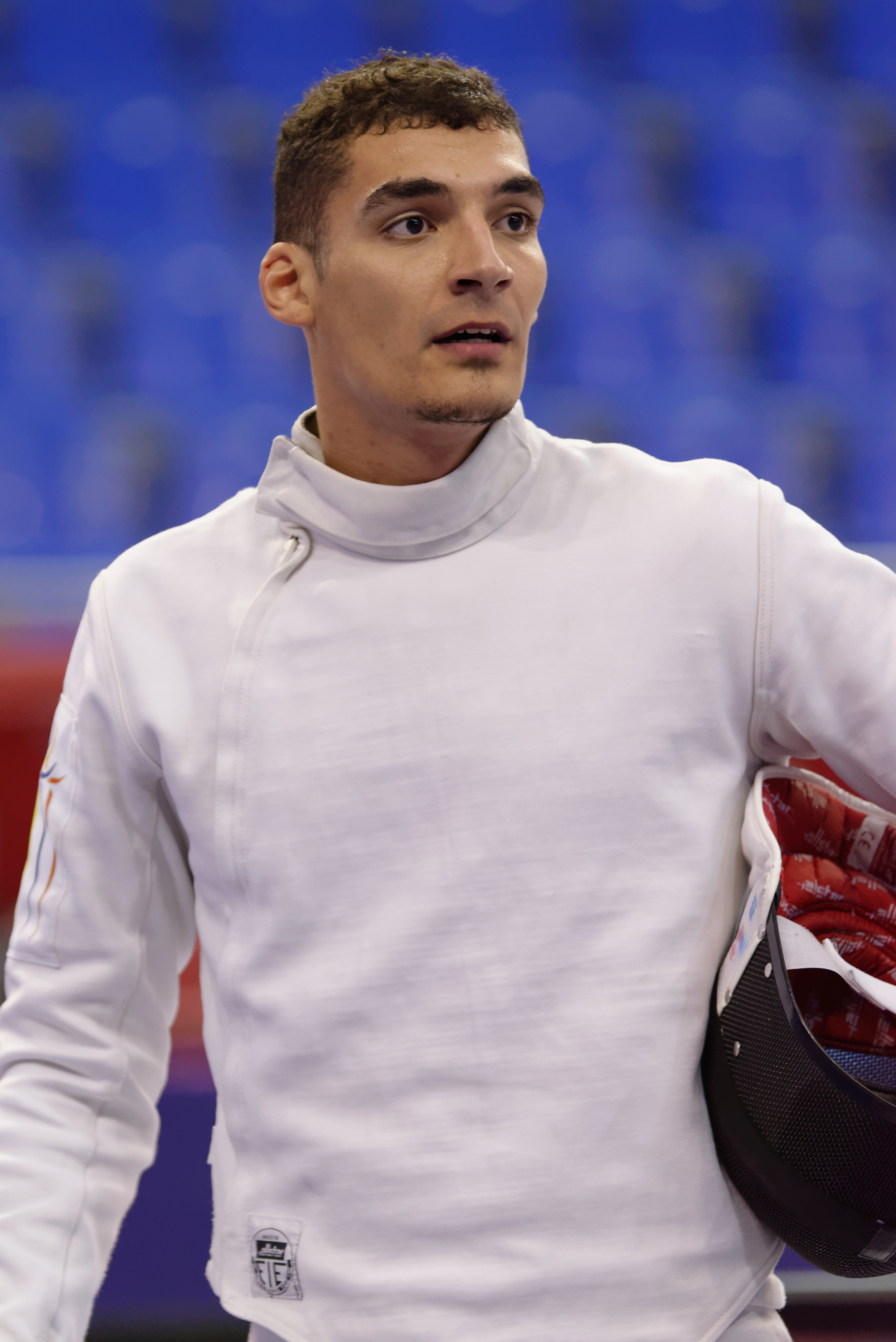
- Rodriguez at Challenge SNCF Réseau 2016

Personal information
- Born: 24 January 1991 (age 35) Buga, Valle del Cauca, Colombia
- Height: 2.05 m (6 ft 9 in)
- Weight: 94 kg (207 lb)

Fencing career
- Sport: Fencing
- Weapon: Épée
- Hand: left-handed
- Club: Saint-Gratien / Olga Quevedo Épee
- FIE ranking: current ranking
Medal record
Representing Colombia
Men's fencing
Event	1st	2nd	3rd
World Cup stage	0	1	0
Pan American Games	0	0	1
Pan American Championships	0	4	2
CAC Games	3	3	0
South American Games	2	0	2
Bolivarian Games	2	4	2
Total	7	12	7
World Cup stage
Silver medal – second place	2022 Bern	Individual épée
Pan American Games
Bronze medal – third place	2019 Lima	Individual épée
Pan American Championships
Silver medal – second place	2017 Montreal	Individual épée
Silver medal – second place	2022 Asunción	Team épée
Silver medal – second place	2023 Lima	Team épée
Silver medal – second place	2024 Lima	Team épée
Bronze medal – third place	2016 Panama City	Team épée
Bronze medal – third place	2023 Lima	Individual épée
Central American and Caribbean Games
Gold medal – first place	2023 San Salvador	Individual épée
Gold medal – first place	2026 Santo Domingo	Individual épée
Gold medal – first place	2026 Santo Domingo	Team épée
Silver medal – second place	2014 Veracruz	Team épée
Silver medal – second place	2018 Barranquilla	Team épée
Silver medal – second place	2023 San Salvador	Team épée
South American Games
Gold medal – first place	2022 Asunción	Individual épée
Gold medal – first place	2022 Asunción	Team épée
Bronze medal – third place	2018 Cochabamba	Individual épée
Bronze medal – third place	2018 Cochabamba	Team épée
Bolivarian Games
Gold medal – first place	2017 Santa Marta	Individual épée
Gold medal – first place	2025 Lima-Ayacucho	Individual épée
Silver medal – second place	2017 Santa Marta	Team épée
Silver medal – second place	2022 Valledupar	Individual épée
Silver medal – second place	2022 Valledupar	Team épée
Silver medal – second place	2025 Lima-Ayacucho	Team épée
Bronze medal – third place	2013 Trujillo	Individual épée
Bronze medal – third place	2013 Trujillo	Team épée

Jhon Édison Rodríguez Quevedo (born 24 January 1991) is a Colombian fencer. He competed in the men's épée event at the 2016 Summer Olympics.
