= Alberto González (fencer) =

Argentine fencer (born 1972)

Personal information
- Born: 22 October 1972 (age 53) Buenos Aires, Argentina

Sport
- Sport: Fencing
Medal record
Representing Argentina
Pan American Games
Bronze medal – third place	1995 Mar del Plata	Team foil
South American Games
Bronze medal – third place	2010 Medellin	Team foil

Alberto González (born 22 October 1972) is an Argentine fencer. He competed at the 1992 and 2008 Summer Olympics.
