= Daniel Gómez (fencer) =

Mexican fencer (born 1990)

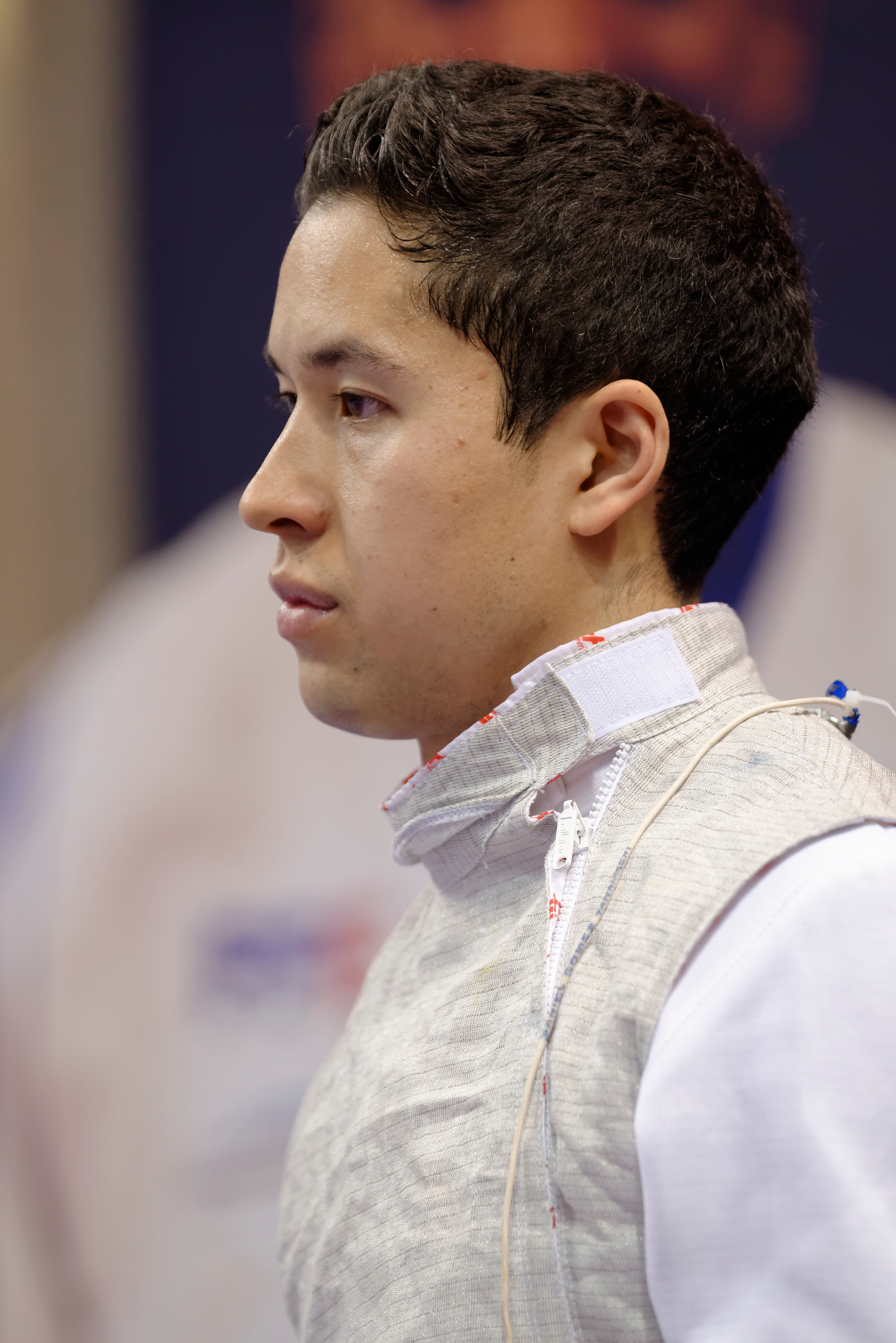

Personal information
- Born: May 6, 1990 (age 36) Mexico City, Mexico
- Height: 1.80 m (5 ft 11 in)
- Weight: 78 kg (172 lb)

Fencing career
- Sport: Fencing
- Country: Mexico
- Weapon: Foil
- Hand: right-handed
- FIE ranking: current ranking
Medal record
Representing Mexico
Pan American Games
Bronze medal – third place	2015 Toronto	Individual foil
Bronze medal – third place	2015 Toronto	Team foil
Central American and Caribbean Games
Gold medal – first place	2010 Mayaguez	Individual foil
Gold medal – first place	2014 Veracruz	Individual foil
Silver medal – second place	2010 Mayaguez	Team foil
Silver medal – second place	2014 Veracruz	Team foil

Daniel Gómez Tanamachi (born 6 May 1990) is a Mexican fencer. At the 2012 Summer Olympics he competed in the Men's foil, but was defeated in the second round. He competed at the 2016 Summer Olympics but was again knocked out in the second round.

Gómez won gold medals at the 2010 and Veracruz 2014, becoming the only Mexican male fencer in history to win two games in a row. He also won back-to-back silver medals in the team events.

Gómez also won two medals at the 2015 Pan American Games in Toronto in the individual foil and team foil events.

Gómez is of Japanese descent. He began fencing at the age of 12.

== See also ==
- List of Pennsylvania State University Olympians
