= Alejandra Terán =

Mexican fencer (born 1991)

Personal information
- Born: 20 January 1991 (age 35) San Pedro Garza Garcia, Nuevo León

Sport
- Sport: Fencing
Medal record
Representing Mexico
Pan American Games
Silver medal – second place	2011 Guadalajara	Team sabre
Bronze medal – third place	2011 Guadalajara	Team foil
Central American and Caribbean Games
Gold medal – first place	2014 Veracruz	Team foil
Silver medal – second place	2010 Mayaguez	Team épée
Bronze medal – third place	2018 Barranquilla	Team épée
Bronze medal – third place	2018 Barranquilla	Team foil

Alejandra Terán Eligio (born 20 January 1991) is a Mexican fencer. She competed in the women's épée event at the 2016 Summer Olympics. In 2017, she competed in the women's team foil event at the 2017 Pan American Fencing Championships held in Montreal, Canada.
