= Katina Proestakis =

Chilean fencer

Personal information
- Nationality: Chilean
- Born: 14 June 2002 (age 24)

Sport
- Sport: Fencing
Medal record
Women's fencing
Representing Chile
Junior Pan American Games
Gold medal – first place	2021 Cali-Valle	Individual foil
South American Games
Gold medal – first place	2022 Asunción	Team foil
Silver medal – second place	2022 Asunción	Individual foil

Katina Proestakis (born 14 June 2002) is a Chilean fencer. She competed in the women's foil event at the 2020 Summer Olympics held in Tokyo, Japan.

In 2017, she competed in the women's team foil event at the Pan American Fencing Championships held in Montreal, Canada.

She competed at the 2022 World Fencing Championships held in Cairo, Egypt.
