= Kelvin Caña =

Venezuelan fencer

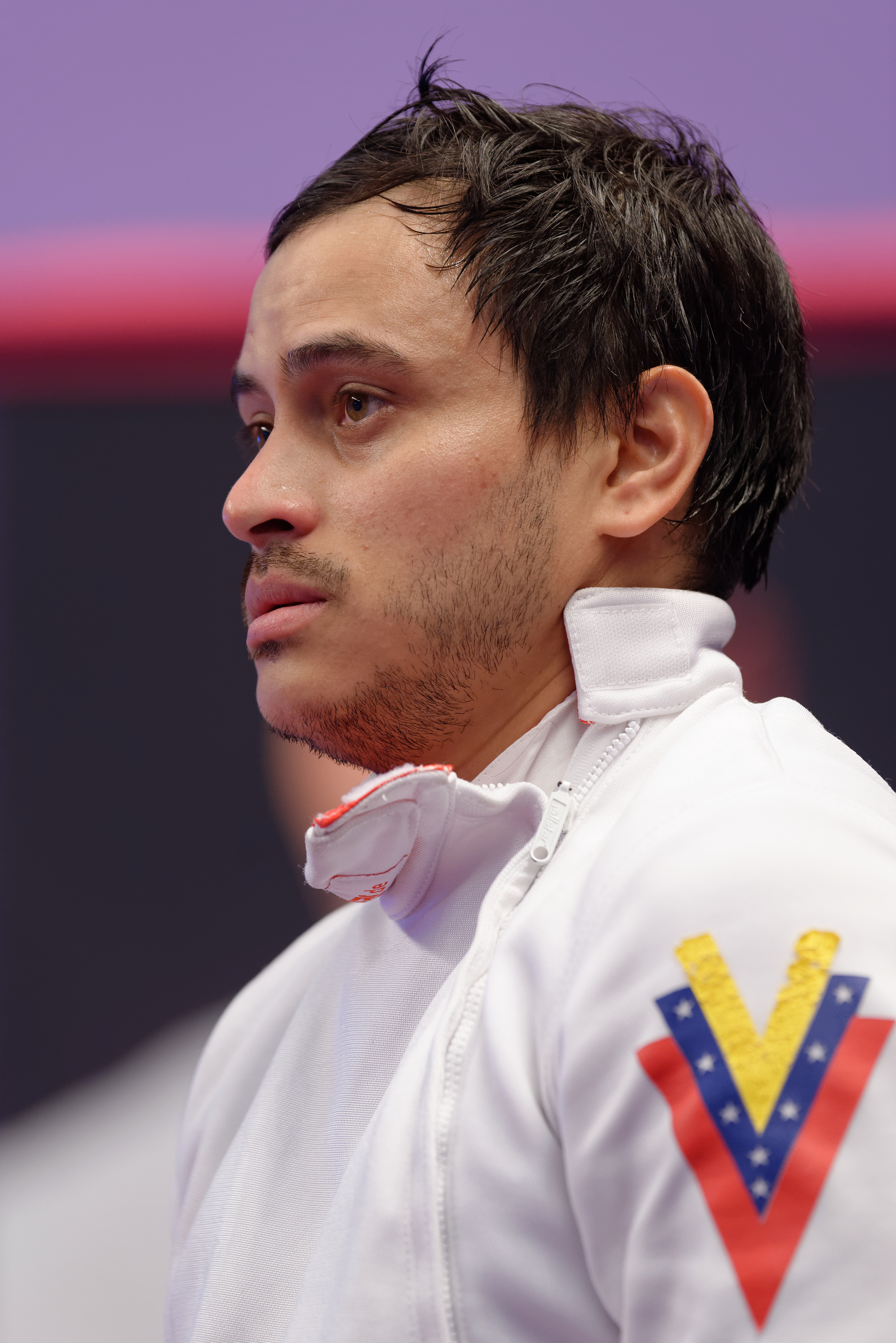

Personal information
- Full name: Kelvin José Caña Infante
- Nickname: El Gris
- Born: 6 August 1987 (age 38) Ciudad Bolívar, Venezuela
- Height: 1.73 m (5 ft 8 in)
- Weight: 72 kg (159 lb)

Fencing career
- Sport: Fencing
- Country: Venezuela
- Weapon: épée
- Hand: right-armed
- Club: Asociación de Esgrima Estado Bolívar Jesús “Chuchú” Gruber
- FIE ranking: current ranking
Medal record
Pan American Championships
Gold medal – first place	Panama City 2016	Team
Silver medal – second place	Santiago de Chile 2015	Team
Bronze medal – third place	San José 2014	Individual

Kelvin José Caña Infante (sometimes spelt Kelvin Cañas; born August 6, 1987) is a Venezuelan épée fencer, individual bronze medallist at the 2014 Pan American Fencing Championships and team gold medallist at the 2016 Pan American Fencing Championships. He competed in the 2016 Summer Olympics men's team épée event as a reserve.
