= Anthony Pérez (basketball) =

Venezuelan basketball player

No. 23 – Gladiadores de Anzoátegui
- Position: Small forward / power forward
- League: LPB

Personal information
- Born: 29 September 1993 (age 33) Sucre, Venezuela
- Listed height: 6 ft 9 in (2.06 m)
- Listed weight: 213 lb (97 kg)

Career information
- High school: Word of Life (Wichita, Kansas)
- College: Ole Miss (2012–2016)
- NBA draft: 2016: undrafted
- Playing career: 2016–present

Career history
- 2016–2017: Soles de Mexicali
- 2017–2020: Trotamundos de Carabobo
- 2020–2022: Guaiqueríes de Margarita
- 2022–present: Gladiadores de Anzoátegui
Medals
Men's basketball
Representing Venezuela
FIBA South American Championship
Gold medal – first place	2016 Venezuela

Anthony Pérez-Cortesia (born 29 September 1993) is a Venezuelan professional basketball player, who represented Venezuela at the 2016 Olympic Games in Rio de Janeiro.

== College career ==
Pérez played college basketball at Ole Miss, with the Ole Miss Rebels, in the United States, where his head coach, Andy Kennedy, called him one of the "greatest mysteries" he's ever coached. This was based on his ability to sharp shoot on certain nights.

== Professional career ==
Pérez began his pro career in 2016, with the Mexican League club Soles de Mexicali.

On 30 October 2020, Perez signed with Guaiqueríes de Margarita.

== National team career ==
Pérez has been a member of the senior men's Venezuelan national basketball team. He played at the 2016 South American Championship, where he won a gold medal, and at the 2016 Olympic Games.
