= Athos Schwantes =

Brazilian fencer (born 1985)

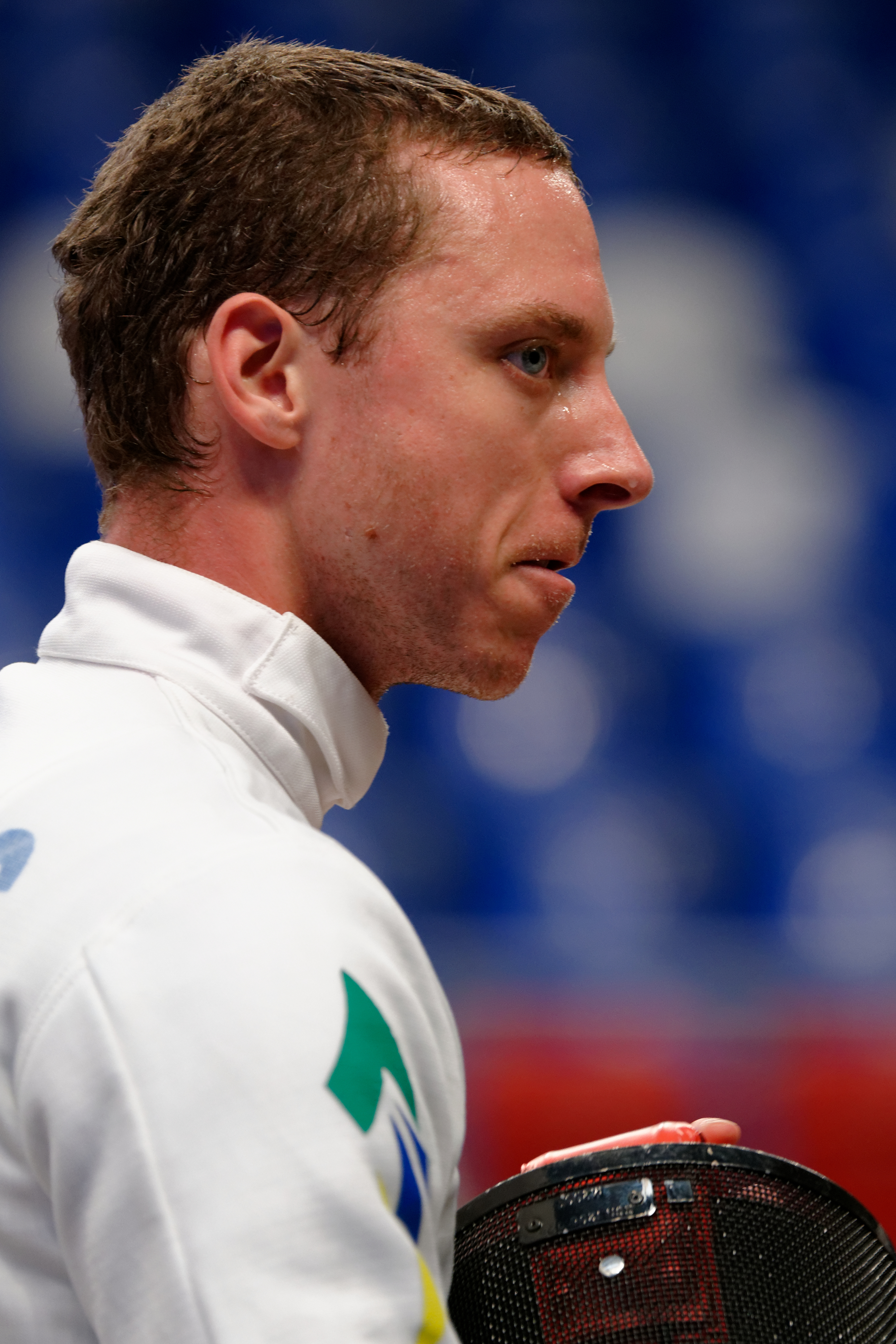
- At the 2014 Paris World Cup

Personal information
- Born: Athos Marangon Schwantes; 13 February 1985 (age 41) Curitiba, Paraná
- Height: 1.90 m (6 ft 3 in)
- Weight: 86 kg (190 lb; 13.5 st)

Fencing career
- Sport: Fencing
- Country: Brazil
- Weapon: épée
- Hand: right-handed
- FIE ranking: current ranking
Medal record
Men's fencing
Representing Brazil
South American Games
Silver medal – second place	2006 B.Aires	Team épée
Bronze medal – third place	2010 Medellin	Team épée
Bronze medal – third place	2014 Santiago	Team épée

Athos Marangon Schwantes (born 13 February 1985) is a Brazilian fencer. At the 2012 Summer Olympics he competed in the Men's épée, but was defeated in the first round. He also competed at the 2016 Summer Olympics in Rio de Janeiro, where he beat Czech Jiří Beran in the first round, but lost in the second round to the French Gauthier Grumier, who was the first seed.
