= María Martínez (fencer) =

Venezuelan fencer (born 1983)

Maria Gabriela Martinez
Personal information
- Born: January 3, 1983 (age 43)
- Height: 1.7 m (5 ft 7 in)
- Weight: 59 kg (130 lb)

Sport
- Country: Venezuela
- Sport: Fencing
- Event: Epee
Medal record
Women's Fencing
Representing Venezuela
Pan American Championships
| Silver medal – second place | 2014 San Jose | Team |
| Silver medal – second place | 2019 Toronto | Individual |
Pan American Games
| Silver medal – second place | 2015 Toronto | Team |
| Bronze medal – third place | 2015 Toronto | Individual |
Central American and Caribbean Games
| Gold medal – first place | 2010 Mayagüez | Team |
| Silver medal – second place | 2014 Veracruz | Team |
| Bronze medal – third place | 2010 Mayagüez | Individual |
| Bronze medal – third place | 2014 Veracruz | Individual |
Bolivarian Games
| Gold medal – first place | 2013 Trujillo | Team |
| Silver medal – second place | 2013 Trujillo | Individual |
South American Games
| Gold medal – first place | 2014 Santiago | Individual |
| Silver medal – second place | 2014 Santiago | Team |
| Bronze medal – third place | 2010 Medellin | Team |
- Updated on 29 June 2019

María Gabriela Martínez (born 3 January 1983) is a Venezuelan épée fencer.

== Career ==
She won silver in individual épée at the 2019 Pan American Fencing Championships held in Toronto, Canada and has also represented her country in two Olympics, the 2008 Summer Olympics held in Beijing, China and 2012 Summer Olympics in London, England in women's individual épée.

== Personal life ==
She is a member of the Church of Jesus Christ of Latter-day Saints.
