= Nicolas Ferreira =

Brazilian fencer

Personal information
- Born: 25 September 1992 (age 33)

Sport
- Sport: Fencing

Nicolas Ferreira (born 25 September 1992) is a Brazilian fencer. He competed in the men's épée event at the 2016 Summer Olympics.
