= Silvio Fernández (fencer born 1979) =

Venezuelan fencer

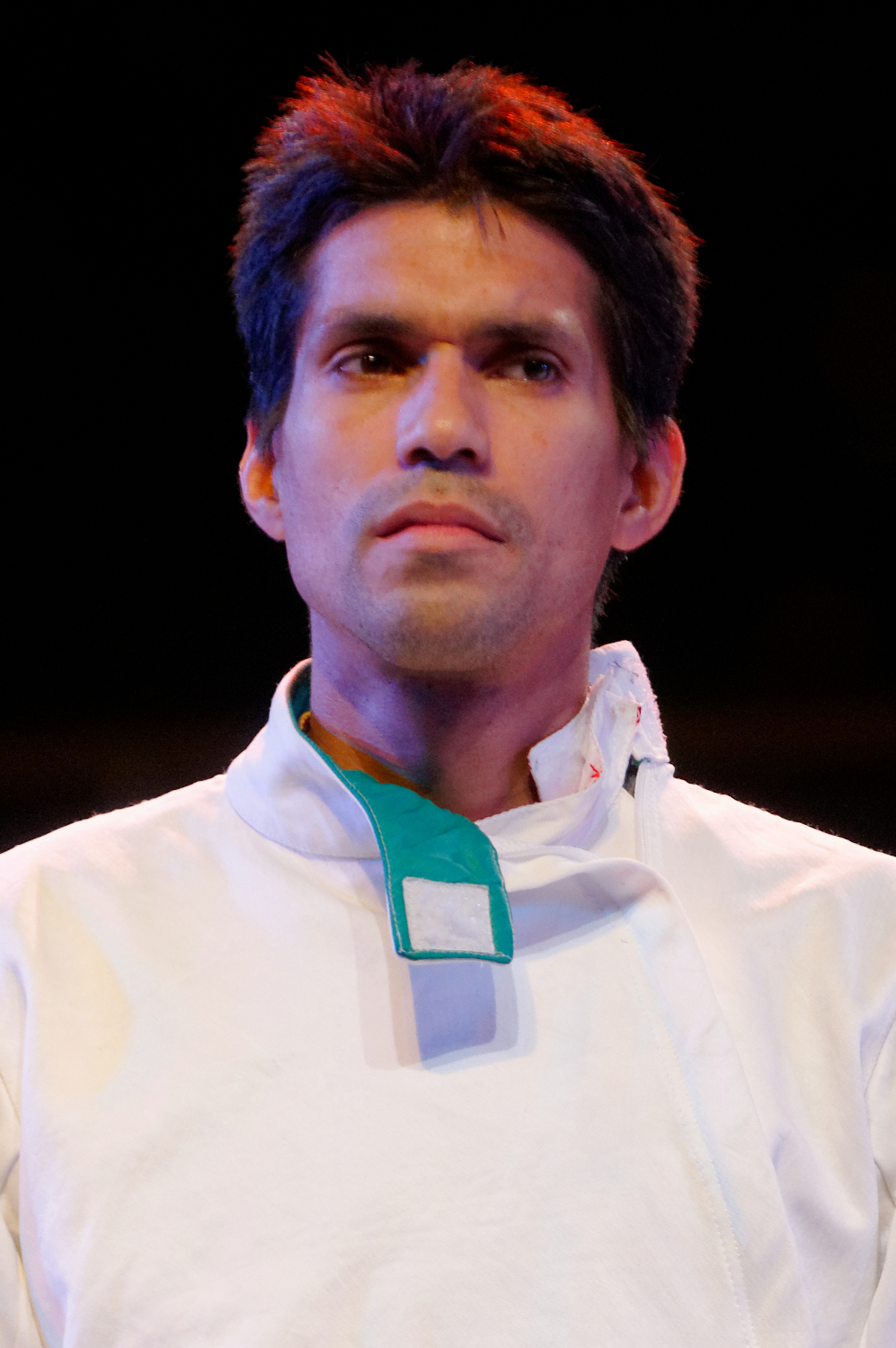
- Fernández at the Masters épée 2012

Personal information
- Born: 9 January 1979 (age 47) Caracas, Venezuela
- Height: 1.90 m (6 ft 3 in)
- Weight: 80 kg (176 lb)

Fencing career
- Sport: Fencing
- Weapon: épée
- Hand: right-handed
- FIE ranking: current ranking
Medal record
Men's Fencing
Representing Venezuela
Pan American Games
Silver medal – second place	2007 Rio de Janeiro	Team épée
Silver medal – second place	2011 Guadalajara	Team épée
Bronze medal – third place	2007 Rio de Janeiro	Épée
Bronze medal – third place	2011 Guadalajara	Épée
Central American and Caribbean Games
Gold medal – first place	2010 Mayagüez	Épée
Gold medal – first place	2010 Mayagüez	Team épée
Silver medal – second place	2006 Cartagena	Épée
Silver medal – second place	2006 Cartagena	Team épée
Silver medal – second place	2014 Veracruz	Épée

Silvio Fernández Briceño (born January 9, 1979) is a Venezuelan épée fencer. He has competed in four Olympic Games (2004, 2008, 2012 and 2016) and four FIE world championships (2003, 2005, 2006, 2007). Fernández has been ranked as high as third in the world on the FIE points list.

He finished 2nd at the 2008 Challenge Bernadotte in Stockholm.

In June 2013, he earned the gold medal in the Pan American Fencing Championships in Cartagena after defeating his fellow countryman Rubén Limardo.
