= Jesús Limardo =

Venezuelan fencer (born 1996)

Personal information
- Born: 29 February 1996 (age 30)

Fencing career
- Sport: Fencing
- Country: Venezuela
- Weapon: Épée
- Hand: Right-handed
- FIE ranking: current ranking
Medal record
Men's épée
Representing Venezuela
World Championships
Bronze medal – third place	2023 Milan	Team
Pan American Games
Silver medal – second place	2019 Lima	Individual
Pan American Championships
Gold medal – first place	2024 Lima	Team
Gold medal – first place	2025 Rio de Janeiro	Team
Silver medal – second place	2019 Toronto	Individual
Silver medal – second place	2026 Lima	Team
Bronze medal – third place	2024 Lima	Individual
Central American and Caribbean Games
Gold medal – first place	2018 Barranquilla	Team

Jesús Limardo (born 29 February 1996) is a Venezuelan épée fencer. He won the silver medal in the men's épée event at the 2019 Pan American Games held in Lima, Peru. His older brother Rubén Limardo won the gold medal.
