= Eileen Grench =

Panamanian fencer (born 1986)

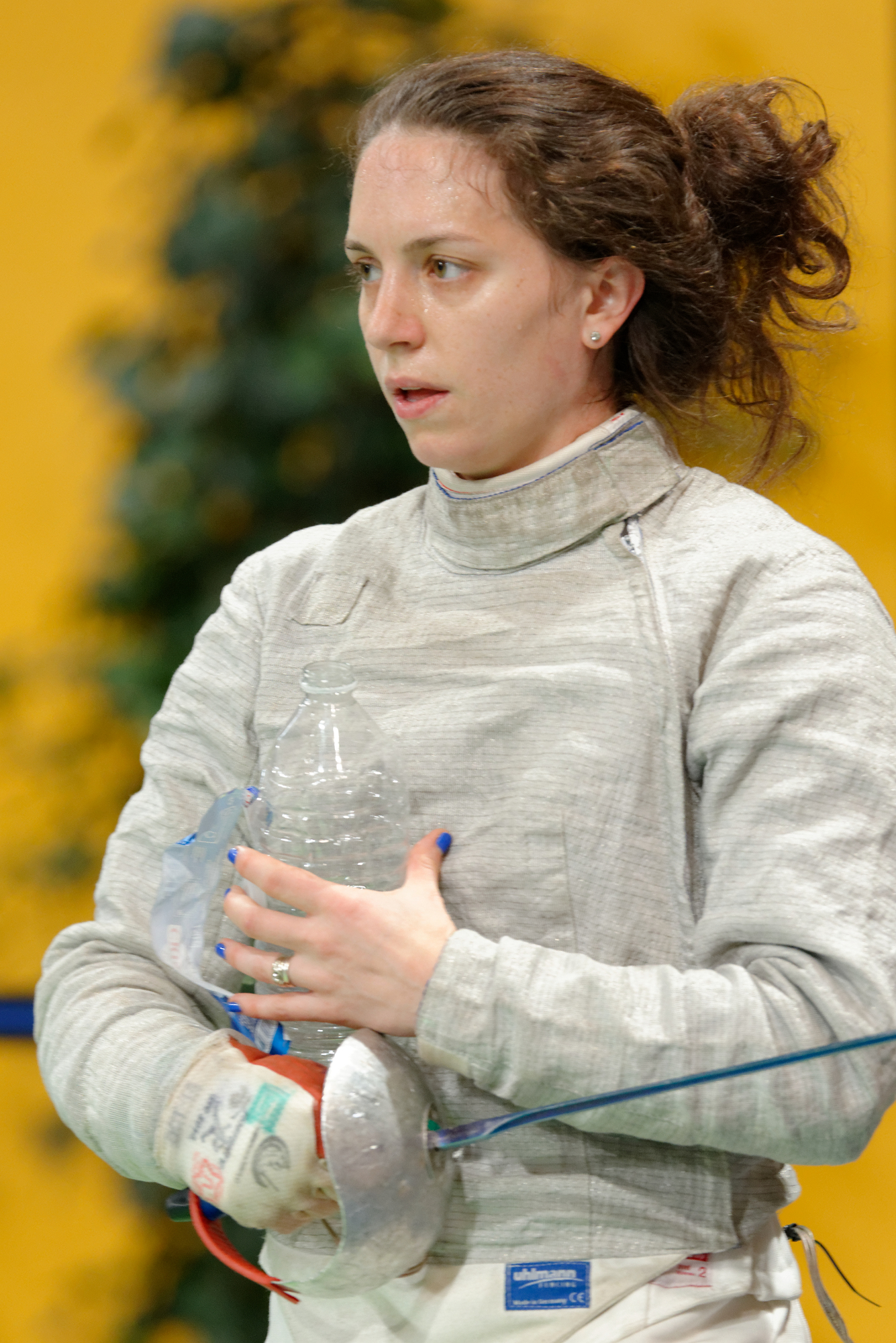

Personal information
- Born: 5 August 1986 (age 39)
- Home town: New York City, New York, United States
- Height: 1.52 m (5 ft 0 in)
- Weight: 59 kg (130 lb)

Fencing career
- Sport: Fencing
- Country: Panama
- Weapon: sabre
- Hand: right-handed
- Head coach: Alexander Lepeshinski
- FIE ranking: current ranking

Eileen Grench (born 5 August 1986) is a Panamanian sabre fencer and a journalist. She competed in the 2016 Summer Olympics held in Rio de Janeiro.

== Biography ==
A graduate of the Columbia University Graduate School of Journalism, her work as an investigative reporter covering global migration appeared in The Intercept, The Nation, and Documented. She covered juvenile justice in New York for the online news source The City. Since April 2022, Grench has been a justice reporter at The Daily Beast.
