= Grabiel Lugo =

Venezuelan fencer

Personal information
- Born: 1996 (age 29–30)

Fencing career
- Sport: Fencing
- Country: Venezuela
- Weapon: épée
- Hand: right-handed
Medal record
Men's épée
Representing Venezuela
World Championships
Bronze medal – third place	2023 Milan	Team
Pan American Championships
Silver medal – second place	2026 Lima	Team

Grabiel Lugo (born 1996) is a Venezuelan right-handed fencer. He competed in the 2024 Summer Olympics in both the Men's Épée Individual and Men's Épée Team events. He was part of the bronze medal-winning Venezuelan team at the 2023 World Fencing Championships in the team épée event. He also won gold in the team épée event at the 2017 Pan American Fencing Championships alongside the Limardo brothers.
