= Julián Ayala =

Mexican fencer (born 1992)

Personal information
- Born: 6 March 1992 (age 34)

Sport
- Sport: Fencing
Medal record
Men's fencing
Representing Mexico
Pan American Fencing Championships
Bronze medal – third place	2024 Lima	Team Sabre

Julián Ayala (born 6 March 1992) is a Mexican fencer. He competed in the men's sabre event at the 2016 Summer Olympics.
