= José Quintero (fencer) =

Venezuelan fencer (born 1996)

Personal information
- Full name: José Félix Quintero Heredia
- Nationality: Venezuela
- Born: 6 November 1996 (age 29) Barquisimeto, Venezuela

Sport
- Sport: Fencing
Medal record
Men's fencing
Representing Venezuela
Pan American Games
Bronze medal – third place	2023 Santiago	Team sabre
Pan American Championships
Bronze medal – third place	2026 Lima	Team

José Quintero (born 6 November 1996 in Barquisimeto) is a Venezuelan sabre fencer. He competed in the 2020 Summer Olympics.
