= Isis Giménez =

Venezuelan fencer (born 1990)

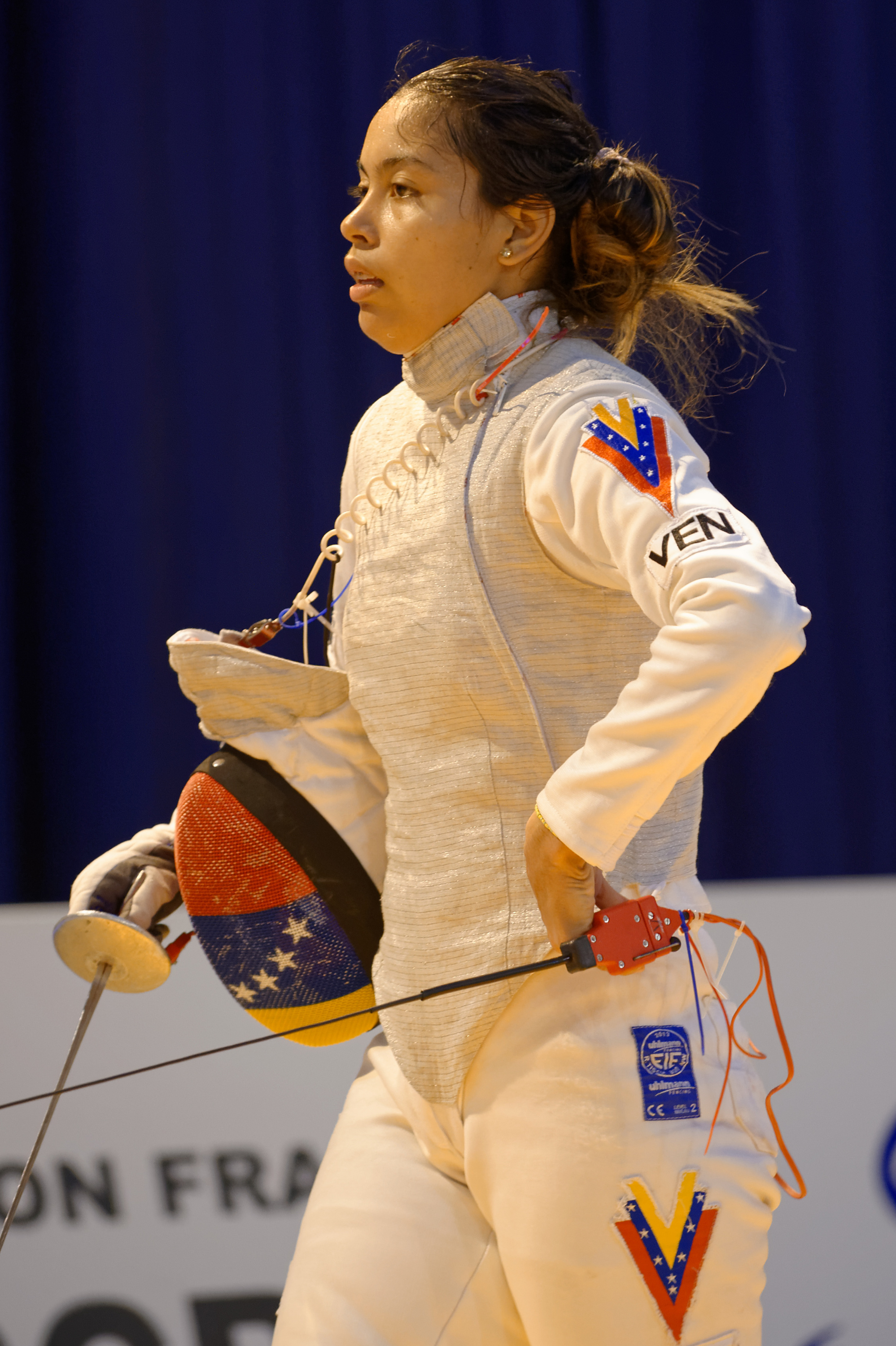

Personal information
- Born: 30 July 1990 (age 35)

Sport
- Sport: Fencing

Isis Giménez (born 30 July 1990) is a Venezuelan fencer. She competed in the women's foil event at the 2016 Summer Olympics.
