= Antonio Leal (fencer) =

Venezuelan fencer (born 1987)

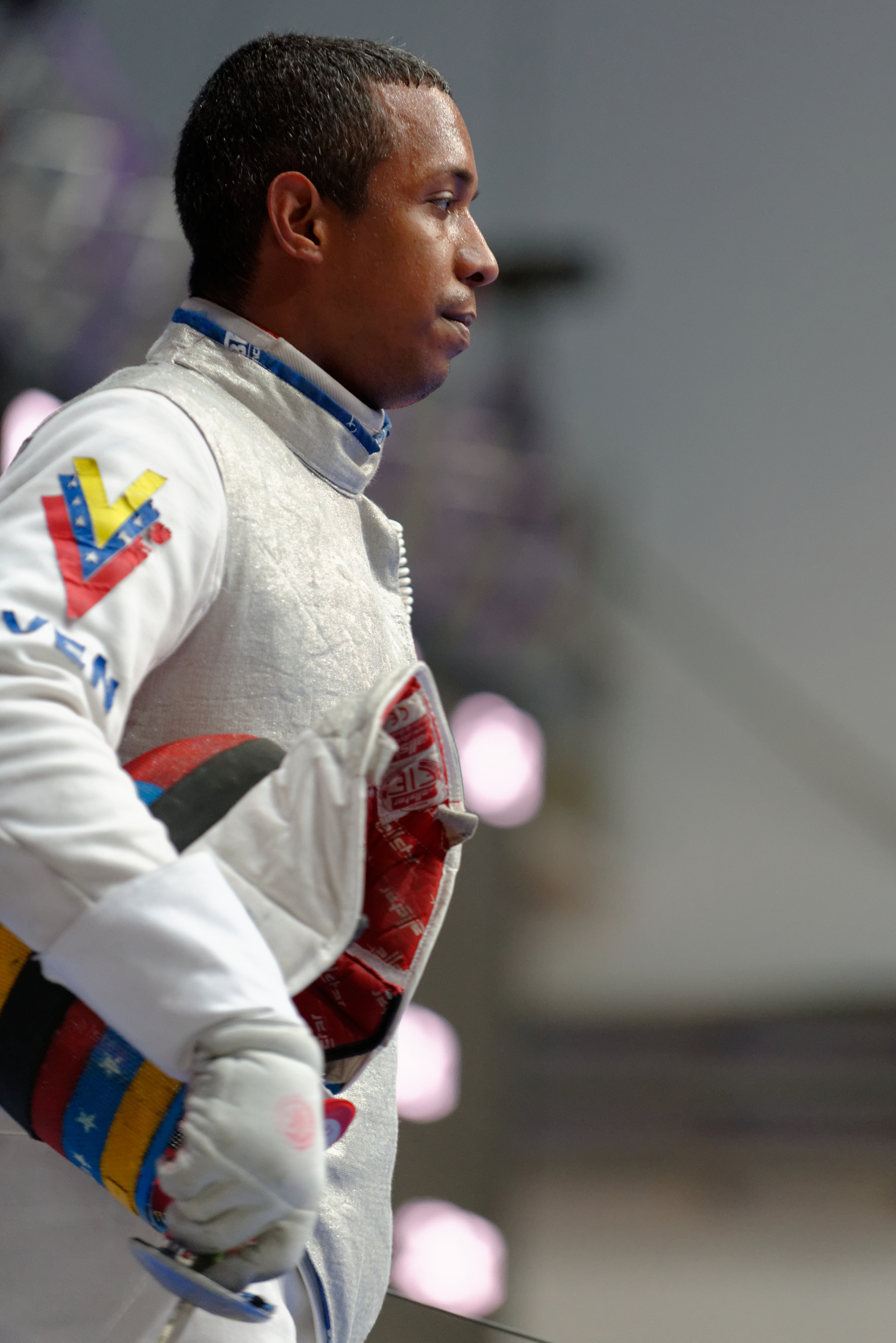
- Leal at the 2013 World Fencing Championships

Personal information
- Born: 25 June 1987 (age 39)
- Height: 1.82 m (6 ft 0 in)
- Weight: 76 kg (168 lb)

Fencing career
- Sport: Fencing
- Weapon: foil
- Hand: right-handed
- FIE ranking: current ranking
Medal record
Men's Foil
Representing Venezuela
Pan American Games
Bronze medal – third place	2011 Guadalajara	Individual
Pan American Championships
Gold medal – first place	2010 San José	Individual

Antonio Leal (born 25 June 1987) is a Venezuelan foil fencer, Pan American champion in 2010 and bronze medallist at the 2011 Pan American Games. He also won a gold medal in the individual foil event at the 2013 Bolivarian Games, as well as a gold medal in team épée and a silver medal in team foil. He won a gold medal in individual foil at the 2017 Bolivarian Games.
