= Francisco Limardo =

Venezuelan fencer (born 1987)

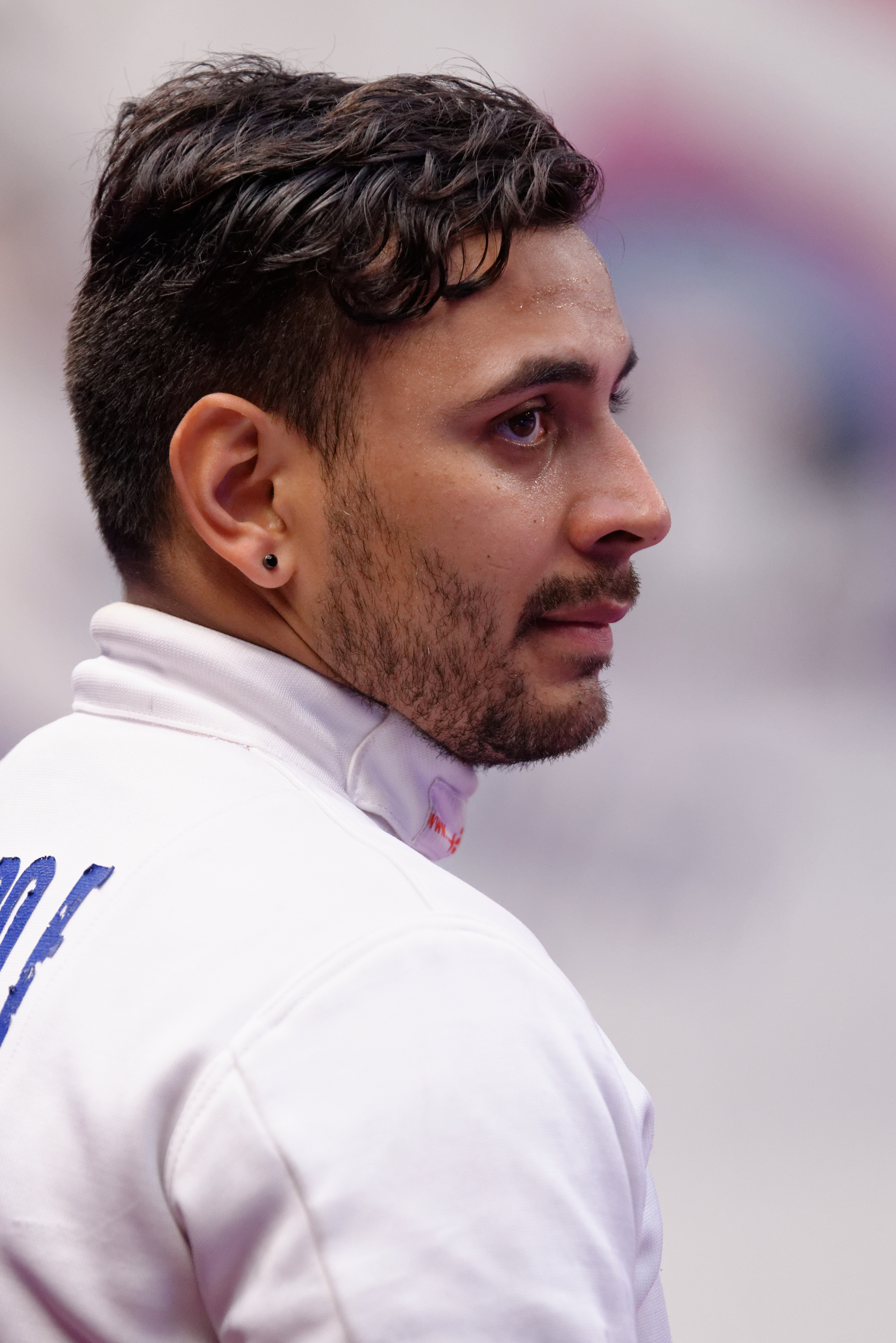

Personal information
- Full name: Francisco Alberto Limardo Gascón
- Born: 27 March 1987 (age 39) Ciudad Bolívar, Bolívar, Venezuela
- Height: 1.83 m (6 ft 0 in)
- Weight: 75 kg (165 lb)

Fencing career
- Sport: Fencing
- Weapon: épée
- Hand: right-handed
- National coach: Rupert Gascon
- FIE ranking: current ranking
Medal record
Men's épée
Representing Venezuela
World Championships
| Bronze medal – third place | 2023 Milan | Team |
Pan American Games
| Bronze medal – third place | 2019 Lima | Team |
| Bronze medal – third place | 2023 Santiago | Individual |
Central American and Caribbean Games
| Gold medal – first place | 2014 Veracruz | Individual |
Pan American Championships
| Gold medal – first place | 2014 San Jose | Individual |
| Gold medal – first place | 2024 Lima | Team |
| Gold medal – first place | 2025 Rio de Janeiro | Team |
| Silver medal – second place | 2015 Santiago | Team |
| Silver medal – second place | 2026 Lima | Team |
| Bronze medal – third place | 2015 Santiago | Individual |

Francisco Alberto Limardo Gascón (born 27 March 1987) is a Venezuelan épée fencer. He is the brother of Rubén Limardo, who won Venezuela's first gold medal from a forty-four year drought at the 2012 Summer Olympics in London.

Limardo competed as a member of the national fencing team at the 2008 Summer Olympics in Beijing, along with his brother Ruben, and compatriots Wolfgang Mejías and Silvio Fernández. Limardo and his team, however, lost the fifth place match of men's team épée to the Hungarian team (led by Géza Imre), with a total score of 20 touches.
