= Fencing at the 2011 Pan American Games – Men's team sabre =

Men's team sabre at the 2011 Pan American Games
- Venue: Multipurpose Gymnasium
- Dates: October 29
- Competitors: 31 from 8 nations

Medalists
Gold medal	Benjamin Igoe; Timothy Morehouse; James Williams	United States
Silver medal	Joseph Polossifakis; Philippe Beaudry; Vincent Couturier; Anthony Prymack	Canada
Bronze medal	Renzo Agresta; William De Moraes; Tywilliam Pacheco; Heitor Shimbo	Brazil

The men's team sabre competition of the fencing events at the 2011 Pan American Games in Guadalajara, Mexico, was held on October 29 at the Multipurpose Gymnasium. The defending champion was the team from the United States.

The team sabre competition consisted of a three-round single-elimination bracket with a bronze medal match between the two semifinal losers and classification semifinals and finals for 5th to 8th places. Teams consist of three members each. Matches consist of nine bouts, with every fencer on one team facing each fencer on the other team. Scoring carried over between bouts with a total of 45 touches being the team goal. Bouts lasted until one team reached the target multiple of 5 touches. For example, if the first bout ended with a score of 5–3, that score would remain into the next bout and the second bout would last until one team reached 10 touches. Bouts also had a maximum time of three minutes each; if the final bout ended before either team reached 45 touches, the team leading at that point won. A tie at that point would result in an additional one-minute sudden-death time period. This sudden-death period was further modified by the selection of a draw-winner beforehand; if neither fencer scored a touch during the minute, the predetermined draw-winner won the bout.

== Schedule ==
All times are Central Standard Time (UTC−6).

Date	Time	Round
October 29, 2011	13:20	Quarterfinals
October 29, 2011	14:50	Fifth to eighth
October 29, 2011	15:00	Semifinals
October 29, 2011	16:30	Fifth place
October 29, 2011	16:30	Bronze medal match
October 29, 2011	20:40	Final

== Draw ==
=== Finals ===
Quarterfinals
1	United States	45
8	Cuba	36
5	Chile	19
4	Brazil	45
3	Venezuela	45
6	Argentina	36
7	Mexico	25
2	Canada	45

Semifinals
1	United States	45
4	Brazil	36
3	Venezuela	31
2	Canada	45

Final
1	United States	45
2	Canada	35
Third place
4	Brazil	45
3	Venezuela	44

=== Classification 5 – 8 ===
Classification
8	Cuba	45
5	Chile	29
6	Argentina	45
7	Mexico	38

Fifth place
8	Cuba	37
6	Argentina	45
Seventh place
5	Chile	36
7	Mexico	45

== Final classification ==
Rank	Team	Athlete
1st place, gold medalist(s)	United States	Benjamin Igoe; Timothy Morehouse; James Williams
2nd place, silver medalist(s)	Canada	Joseph Polossifakis; Philippe Beaudry; Vincent Couturier; Anthony Prymack
3rd place, bronze medalist(s)	Brazil	Renzo Agresta; William De Moraes; Tywilliam Pacheco; Heitor Shimbo
4	Venezuela	Carlos Bravo; Hernán Jansen; Eliezer Rincones; Carlos Rodriguez
5	Argentina	Alexander Achten; Ricardo Bustamante; Alberto Perez; José Dominguez
6	Cuba	Julio Bello; Daylon Diaz; Yoandys Iriarte; Yoelkis Zamora
7	Mexico	Julián Ayala; Oscar Bermejo; Victor Cornejo; Raul Arizaga
8	Chile	Rodrigo Araya; Victor Contreras; Israel Vázquez; Paris Inostroza
