= Fencing at the 2011 Pan American Games – Men's sabre =

Men's sabre at the 2011 Pan American Games
- Venue: Multipurpose Gymnasium
- Dates: October 26
- Competitors: 18 from 10 nations

Medalists
Gold medal	Philippe Beaudry	Canada
Silver medal	Timothy Morehouse	United States
Bronze medal	Hernán Jansen	Venezuela
Bronze medal	Joseph Polossifakis	Canada

The men's sabre competition of the fencing events at the 2011 Pan American Games in Guadalajara, Mexico, was held on October 26 at the Multipurpose Gymnasium. The defending champion was Philippe Beaudry from Canada.

The sabre competition consisted of a qualification round followed by a single-elimination bracket with a bronze medal match between the two semifinal losers. Fencing was done to 15 touches or to the completion of three three-minute rounds if neither fencer reached 15 touches by then. At the end of time, the higher-scoring fencer was the winner; a tie resulted in an additional one-minute sudden-death time period. This sudden-death period was further modified by the selection of a draw-winner beforehand; if neither fencer scored a touch during the minute, the predetermined draw-winner won the bout.

== Schedule ==
All times are Central Standard Time (UTC−6).

Date	Time	Round
October 26, 2011	11:50	Qualification pools
October 26, 2011	13:10	Round of 16
October 26, 2011	13:50	Quarterfinals
October 26, 2011	19:40	Semifinals
October 26, 2011	20:30	Final

== Results ==
=== Qualification ===
All 18 fencers were put into three groups of six athletes, were each fencer would have five individual matches. The top 16 athletes overall would qualify for next round.

Rank	Name	Nation	Victories	TG	TR	Dif.	Notes
1	Alexander Achten	Argentina	5	25	11	+14	Q
2	Renzo Agresta	Brazil	5	25	14	+11	Q
3	Timothy Morehouse	United States	4	24	9	+15	Q
4	Hernán Jansen	Venezuela	4	22	13	+9	Q
5	Daylon Diaz	Cuba	4	23	15	+8	Q
6	Ricardo Bustamante	Argentina	4	23	16	+7	Q
7	Carlos Bravo	Venezuela	4	20	16	+4	Q
8	James Williams	United States	3	19	18	+1	Q
9	Philippe Beaudry	Canada	2	18	18	0	Q
10	Joseph Polossifakis	Canada	2	18	19	-1	Q
11	Yoandys Iriarte	Cuba	2	17	19	-2	Q
12	William De Moraes	Brazil	2	16	18	-2	Q
13	Julián Ayala	Mexico	2	16	20	-4	Q
14	Victor Contreras	Chile	1	18	22	-4	Q
15	John Lopez	El Salvador	1	7	24	-17	Q
16	Carlos Valencia	Colombia	0	16	25	-9	Q
17	Oscar Bermejo	Mexico	0	12	25	-13	
18	Israel Vázquez	Chile	0	8	25	-17	

=== Elimination round ===
Round of 16
1	Alexander Achten (ARG)	15
16	Carlos Valencia (COL)	8
9	Philippe Beaudry (CAN)	15
8	James Williams (USA)	14
5	Daylon Diaz (CUB)	15
12	William De Moraes (BRA)	7
13	Julián Ayala (MEX)	10
4	Hernán Jansen (VEN)	15
3	Timothy Morehouse (USA)	15
14	Victor Contreras (CHI)	10
11	Yoandys Iriarte (CUB)	15
6	Ricardo Bustamante (ARG)	8
10	Joseph Polossifakis (CAN)	15
7	Carlos Bravo (VEN)	5
15	John Lopez (ESA)	3
2	Renzo Agresta (BRA)	15

Quarterfinals
1	Alexander Achten (ARG)	13
9	Philippe Beaudry (CAN)	15
5	Daylon Diaz (CUB)	13
4	Hernán Jansen (VEN)	15
3	Timothy Morehouse (USA)	15
11	Yoandys Iriarte (CUB)	6
10	Joseph Polossifakis (CAN)	15
2	Renzo Agresta (BRA)	12

Semifinals
9	Philippe Beaudry (CAN)	15
4	Hernán Jansen (VEN)	3
3	Timothy Morehouse (USA)	15
10	Joseph Polossifakis (CAN)	9

Final
9	Philippe Beaudry (CAN)	15
3	Timothy Morehouse (USA)	14
