= 2006 Pan American Fencing Championships =

Fencing championship

The 2006 Pan American Fencing Championships were held in Valencia, Venezuela from 26 June to 28 June 2006. The only team events were in men's and women's foil.

== Medal summary ==
=== Men's events ===
Event	Gold	Silver	Bronze
Foil		Andres Carillo Ayana (CUB)	Nicholas Tesseire (CAN); Patricio Moreno Briones (CHI)
Épée	Igor Tikhomirov (CAN)	João Antônio Souza (BRA)	Guillermo Madrigal Sardinas (CUB); Paris Inostroza (CHI)
Sabre	Ivan Lee (USA)	Jason Rogers (USA)	James Williams (USA); Carlos Bravo (VEN)
Team Foil	Canada	United States	Venezuela

=== Women's events ===
Event	Gold	Silver	Bronze
Foil	Emily Cross (USA)	Yulitza Suárez (VEN)	Mariana González (VEN); Ariagne Ribot Laugoy (CUB)
Épée	Zuleydis Ortiz Puente (CUB)	Courtney Hurley (USA)	Sherraine Schalm (CAN); Julie Leprohon (CAN)
Sabre	Sada Jacobson (USA)	Mariel Zagunis (USA)	Alejandra Benítez (VEN); Rebecca Ward (USA)
Team Foil	Canada	Cuba	United States

=== Medal table ===
Rank	Nation	Gold	Silver	Bronze	Total
1	Canada	4	0	3	7
2	United States	3	4	3	10
3	Cuba	1	2	2	5
4	Venezuela	0	1	4	5
5	Brazil	0	1	0	1
6	Chile	0	0	2	2
Totals (6 entries)		8	8	14	30
