= Philippe Beaudry =

Canadian fencer (born 1987)

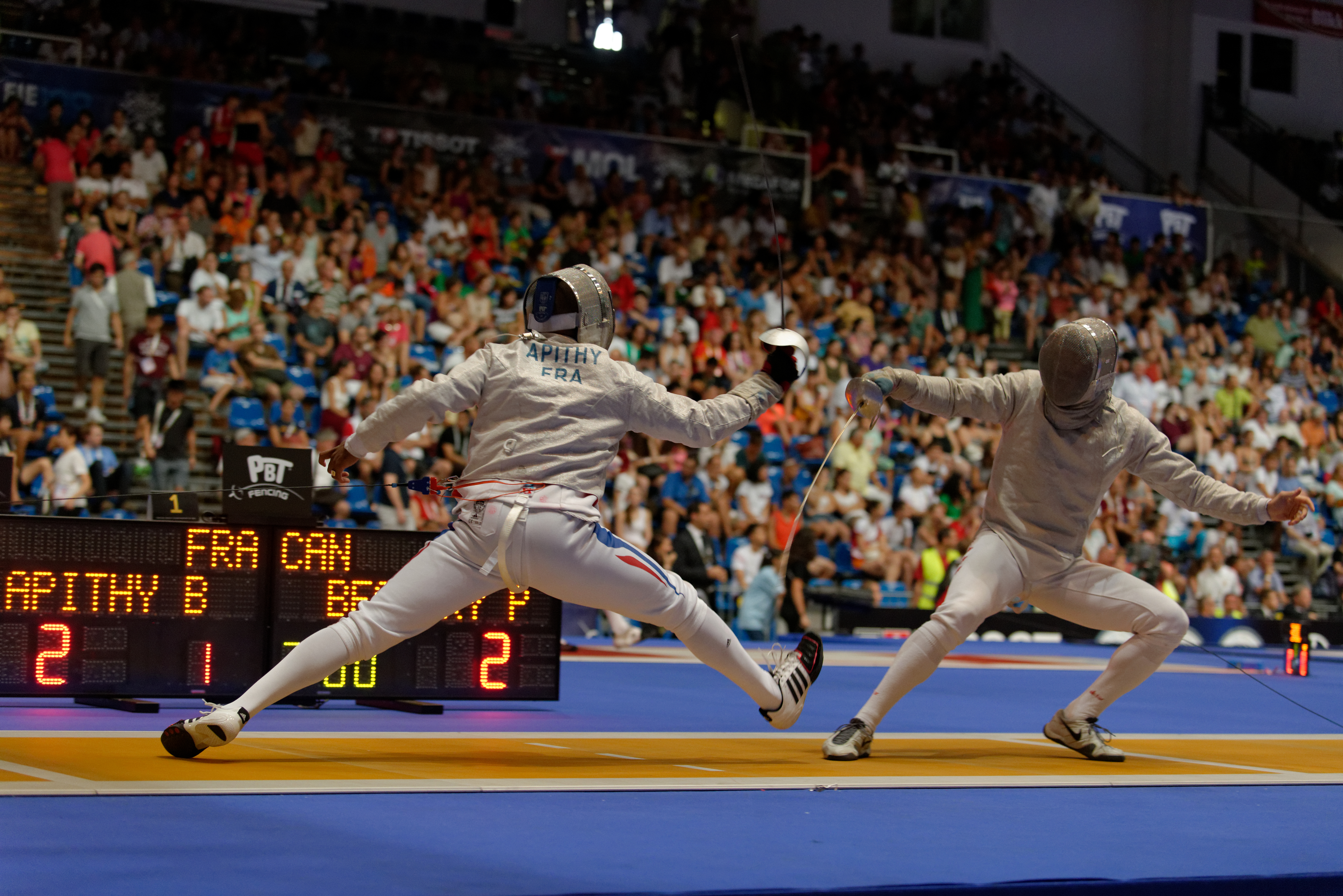

Personal information
- Born: March 16, 1987 (age 39) Sherbrooke, Quebec, Canada
- Height: 1.83 m (6 ft 0 in)
- Weight: 77 kg (170 lb)

Fencing career
- Sport: Fencing
- Weapon: sabre
- Hand: right-handed
- National coach: Dmitry Ronzhin
- Head coach: Jean-Marie Banos
- FIE ranking: current ranking
Medal record
Men's sabre
Representing Canada
Pan American Games
Gold medal – first place	2011 Guadalajara	Individual
Gold medal – first place	2007 Rio de Janeiro	Individual
Silver medal – second place	2007 Rio de Janeiro	Team
Silver medal – second place	2011 Guadalajara	Team
Pan American Championships
Silver medal – second place	2014 San José	Individual
Bronze medal – third place	2008 Querétaro	Individual
Bronze medal – third place	2009 San Salvador	Individual
Bronze medal – third place	2010 San José	Individual
Bronze medal – third place	2011 Reno, Nevada	Individual
Bronze medal – third place	2013 Cartagena	Individual

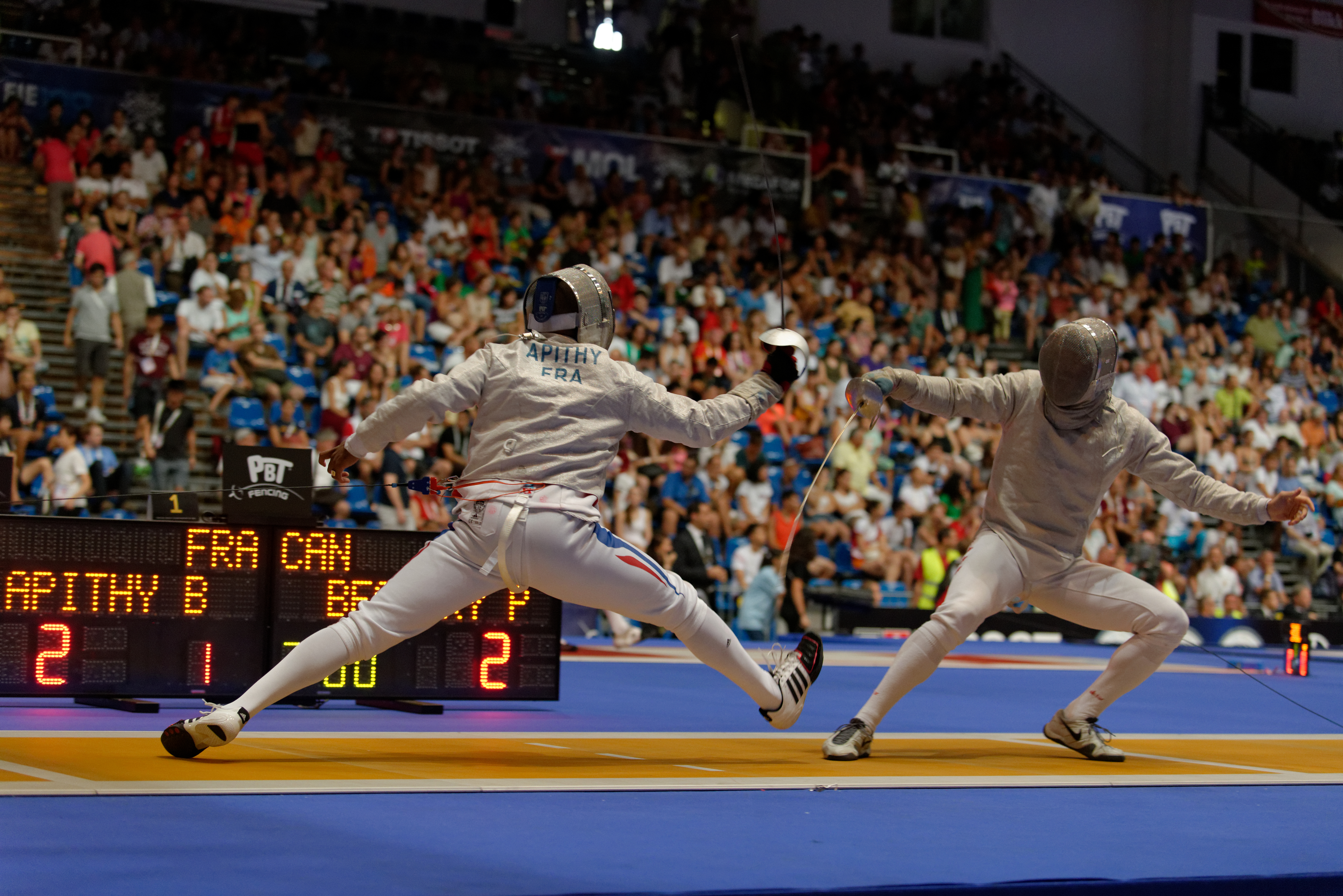
Beaudry, right, at the 2013 World Fencing Championships

Philippe Beaudry (born March 16, 1987) is a Canadian Olympic sabre fencer, twice Pan American champion and eleven-time national champion, both at the junior and senior levels.

== Career ==
Beaudry's father Paul was a top-level fencer, who qualified to compete in the 1980 Summer Olympics, but was prevented from taking part because of Canada's boycott of the Games. Beaudry's parents met at a fencing class his father was teaching at Université de Montréal. Despite this Beaudry was not pressured into fencing. His first sport was basketball, but he never was passionate about it. At the age of thirteen, after his family came back from Lebanon, where they had spent part of his childhood, he tried fencing because it was offered at his high school and immediately took to the sport.

Beaudry made his breakthrough in the 2006–07 season. He won the bronze medal at the 2007 Junior World Championships in Belek after being defeated in the semifinals by Korea's Park Young-jun. He won the gold medal at the 2007 Pan American Games in Rio de Janeiro, prevailing in the final over USA's James Williams.

In the 2007–08 season, Beaudry won his ticket to the 2008 Summer Olympics in Beijing by finishing first in the Americas qualifier in Querétaro. He won the bronze medal in the Pan American Championships also held in Querétaro. For his début Olympics Beaudry won his first bout 15–8 against Egypt's Gamal Fathy, but lost 4–15 in the second round to 2004 Olympic champion Aldo Montano of Italy.

In 2010 Beaudry was injured when a speeding driver crashed into his car while he was stopped at a red light. He got out of the accident with only a few cuts to his right wrist, but the psychological trauma caused him to take a four-month pause, during which he focused on his studies at the John Molson School of Business of Concordia University.

After he got back to training, Beaudry claimed his fourth bronze medal in a row at the 2011 Pan American Championships in Reno, Nevada after losing in the semifinals to USA's Daryl Homer. A few months later he reached the table of 16 at the World Championships in Catania, defeating first France's Boladé Apithy, then Belarus' Valery Pryiemka, but he suffered another drubbing at Montano's hands. A few days later Beaudry successfully defended his title at the 2011 Pan American Games in Guadalajara after defeating in the final USA's Tim Morehouse. He proved the only fencer from outside the United States to win a gold medal. His World Cup results pushed him to a No.21 world ranking at the end of the season, a career best as of 2015.

Beaudry qualified to the 2012 Summer Olympics in London as the second-ranked fencer from the Americas. He received a bye in the first round, then lost 12–15 to Belarus' Dmitry Lapkes.
