= Fencing at the 2015 Pan American Games – Men's sabre =

Men's sabre at the 2015 Pan American Games
- Venue: Toronto Pan Am Sports Centre
- Dates: July 20
- Competitors: 18 from 10 nations

Medalists
Gold medal	Eli Dershwitz	United States
Silver medal	Joseph Polossifakis	Canada
Bronze medal	Renzo Agresta	Brazil
Bronze medal	Ricardo Bustamante	Argentina

The men's sabre competition of the fencing events at the 2015 Pan American Games was held on July 20 at the Toronto Pan Am Sports Centre.

The sabre competition consisted of a qualification round followed by a single-elimination bracket with a bronze medal match between the two semifinal losers. Fencing was done to 15 touches or to the completion of three three-minute rounds if neither fencer reached 15 touches by then. At the end of time, the higher-scoring fencer was the winner; a tie resulted in an additional one-minute sudden-death time period. This sudden-death period was further modified by the selection of a draw-winner beforehand; if neither fencer scored a touch during the minute, the predetermined draw-winner won the bout.

== Schedule ==
All times are Eastern Daylight Time (UTC−4).

Date	Time	Round
July 20, 2015	12:05	Qualification pools
July 20, 2015	13:25	Round of 16
July 20, 2015	14:05	Quarterfinals
July 20, 2015	18:40	Semifinals
July 20, 2015	19:25	Final

== Results ==
The following are the results of the event.

=== Qualification ===
All 18 fencers were put into three groups of six athletes, were each fencer would have five individual matches. The top 16 athletes overall would qualify for next round.

Rank	Name	Nation	Victories	TG	TR	Dif.	Notes
1	Joseph Polossifakis	Canada	5	25	6	+19	Q
2	Ricardo Bustamante	Argentina	5	25	10	+15	Q
3	Shaul Gordon	Canada	5	25	12	+13	Q
4	Renzo Agresta	Brazil	4	22	9	+13	Q
5	Daryl Homer	United States	4	22	13	+9	Q
6	Eli Dershwitz	United States	3	23	19	+4	Q
7	Hector Florencia Padilla	Mexico	3	22	20	+2	Q
8	Julián Ayala	Mexico	3	17	17	0	Q
9	Stefano Lucchetti	Argentina	3	17	20	-3	Q
10	Noslen Montalvo	Cuba	2	19	21	-2	Q
11	José Quintero	Venezuela	2	18	20	-2	Q
12	William Zeytounlian	Brazil	1	18	23	-5	Q
13	Jesus Carvajal	Venezuela	1	17	24	-7	Q
14	Luis Enrique Correa Vila	Colombia	1	16	23	-7	Q
15	Sebastian Cuellar Peña	Colombia	1	14	22	-8	Q
16	Stryker Weller	Virgin Islands	1	11	22	-11	Q
17	Israel Vázquez	Chile	1	10	23	-13	
18	Tarik Ruiz	Chile	0	8	25	-17	

=== Elimination round ===
Round of 16
1	Joseph Polossifakis (CAN)	15
16	Stryker Weller (ISV)	3
9	Stefano Lucchetti (ARG)	7
8	Julián Ayala (MEX)	15
5	Daryl Homer (USA)	15
12	William Zeytounlian (BRA)	8
13	Jesus Carvajal (VEN)	9
4	Renzo Agresta (BRA)	15
3	Shaul Gordon (CAN)	15
14	Luis Enrique Correa Vila (COL)	7
11	José Quintero (VEN)	6
6	Eli Dershwitz (USA)	15
7	Hector Florencia Padilla (MEX)	15
10	Noslen Montalvo (CUB)	15
15	Sebastian Cuellar Peña (COL)	12
2	Ricardo Bustamante (ARG)	15

Quarterfinals
1	Joseph Polossifakis (CAN)	15
8	Julián Ayala (MEX)	8
5	Daryl Homer (USA)	12
4	Renzo Agresta (BRA)	15
3	Shaul Gordon (CAN)	10
6	Eli Dershwitz (USA)	15
10	Noslen Montalvo (CUB)	6
2	Ricardo Bustamante (ARG)	15

Semifinals
1	Joseph Polossifakis (CAN)	15
4	Renzo Agresta (BRA)	13
6	Eli Dershwitz (USA)	15
2	Ricardo Bustamante (ARG)	4

Final
1	Joseph Polossifakis (CAN)	9
6	Eli Dershwitz (USA)	15
