= Fencing at the 2013 Canada Summer Games =

Fencing at the 2013 Canada Summer Games was in Sherbrooke, Quebec at the Centre de l'activité physique of the Cégep de Sherbrooke. It was held from the 12 to 18 August. This was fencing's first time at the Summer Games as it was moved over from the Winter edition to replace rugby sevens. There were 6 events of fencing.

== Medal table ==
The following is the medal table for fencing at the 2013 Canada Summer Games.

* Host nation (Quebec)

Rank	Nation	Gold	Silver	Bronze	Total
1	Quebec*	5	5	3	13
2	British Columbia	4	4	2	10
3	Alberta	2	1	4	7
4	Ontario	1	2	3	6
5	Manitoba	0	0	3	3
5	Saskatchewan	0	0	3	3
Totals (6 entries)		12	12	18	42

== Fencing ==
=== Men's ===
Event	Gold	Silver	Bronze
Foil	Alastair Keyes; Ontario	Eamonn Gomez-Perales; Quebec	Dylan French; British Columbia
Foil	Alastair Keyes; Ontario	Eamonn Gomez-Perales; Quebec	Daniel Gu; Alberta
Foil team	Quebec; François-Olivier David; Eamonn Gomez-Perales	British Columbia; Dylan French; Connor Hopkins	Ontario; Alastair Keyes; Francois Provencher
Épée	Marc-Antoine Blais-Bélanger; Quebec	Alexandre Lyssov; Ontario	Luca Caparini; Alberta
Épée	Marc-Antoine Blais-Bélanger; Quebec	Alexandre Lyssov; Ontario	Clément Féménias-Métivet; Quebec
Épée team	Quebec; Marc-Antoine Blais-Bélanger; Clément Féménias-Métivet	Ontario; Alexandre Lyssov; Joseph Wright	Alberta; Luca Caparini; Zachary Zanussi
Sabre	Shaul Gordon; British Columbia	Fares Arfa; Quebec	Cam Mackay; Manitoba
Sabre	Shaul Gordon; British Columbia	Fares Arfa; Quebec	Will Sacuta; Alberta
Sabre team	Quebec; Fares Arfa; Pascal Lambert	British Columbia; Shant Basmadjian; Shaul Gordon	Manitoba; Cam Mackay; Markel Seitz

=== Women's ===
Event	Gold	Silver	Bronze
Foil	Jerrica Gu; Alberta	Éli Hurtubise; Quebec	Ariane Bilodeau; Quebec
Foil	Jerrica Gu; Alberta	Éli Hurtubise; Quebec	Jenny Zhao; Ontario
Foil team	Alberta; Jerrica Gu; Tanya Nelson	Quebec; Ariane Bilodeau; Éli Hurtubise	Ontario; Zoe Nathania Loh; Jenny Zhao
Épée	Emma von Dadelszen; British Columbia	Vivien Cao; British Columbia	Andrée-Anne Paquet; Quebec
Épée	Emma von Dadelszen; British Columbia	Vivien Cao; British Columbia	Bdhanya Wamaswami; Saskatchewan
Épée team	British Columbia; Vivien Cao; Emma von Dadelszen	Quebec; Leyla-Élise Couture; Andrée-Anne Paquet	Saskatchewan; Bdhanya Ramaswami; Kirsten Van Marion
Sabre	Rach Lamarre; Quebec	Zoe Clarke; British Columbia	Robyn Julienne Cando; British Columbia
Sabre	Rach Lamarre; Quebec	Zoe Clarke; British Columbia	Hagar Outbih; Manitoba
Sabre team	British Columbia; Robyn Julienne Cando; Zoe Clarke	Alberta; Lily Jiang; Madison Thurgood	Saskatchewan; Brooklyn Hill; Maia Stempien
