= Fencing at the 2006 Central American and Caribbean Games =

- Location: Cartagena
- Dates: 15–20 November

The Fencing competition at the 2006 Central American and Caribbean Games was held in Cartagena, Colombia. The tournament was scheduled to be held from 15 to 30 July 2006.

== Medal summary ==
=== Men's events ===
Event	Gold	Silver	Bronze
Individual épée	Andres Carrillo (CUB)	Silvio Fernández (VEN)	Camilo Boris (CUB)
Individual épée	Andres Carrillo (CUB)	Silvio Fernández (VEN)	Rubén Limardo (VEN)
Team épée	Cuba; Camilo Boris; Andres Carrillo; Guillermo Madrigal; Daimar Arteaga	Venezuela; Silvio Fernández; Rubén Limardo; Luymar Fernández; Wolfang Mejias	Puerto Rico; Marcos Pena; Oscar Torres); Jonathan Lugo
Individual foil	Carlos Rodriguez (VEN)	Edgar Chumacero (MEX)	Enrique da Silva (VEN)
Individual foil	Carlos Rodriguez (VEN)	Edgar Chumacero (MEX)	Dimitri Clairet (COL)
Team foil	Venezuela; Yonner Perez; Antonio Leal; Enrique da Silva; Carlos Rodriguez	Colombia; Phanor Pena; Santiago Pachon; Alejandro Hernández; Dimitri Clairet	Puerto Rico; Jonathan Lugo; Marcos Pena; Eduardo Zayas; Oscar Torres
Individual sabre	Carlos Bravo (VEN)	Daylon Diaz (CUB)	Eliecer Rincones (VEN)
Individual sabre	Carlos Bravo (VEN)	Daylon Diaz (CUB)	Yunior Naranjo (CUB)
Team sabre	Cuba; Yunior Naranjo; Daylon Diaz; Ismel Larduet; Julio Bello	Venezuela; Carlos Bravo; Eliecer Rincones; Luis Silva; Hernán Jansen	Mexico; Luis Padilla; José Sánchez; Rodrigo Guardado; Alvaro Dorantes

=== Women's events ===
Event	Gold	Silver	Bronze
Individual épée	Zuleydis Ortiz (CUB)	Jessica Jimenez (PAN)	Eimey Gomez (CUB)
Individual épée	Zuleydis Ortiz (CUB)	Jessica Jimenez (PAN)	Endrina Alvarez (VEN)
Team épée	Cuba; Adriagne Ribot; Yamirka Rodriguez; Eimey Gomez; Zuleydis Ortiz	Venezuela; Eliana Lugo; Nora Arcila; Maria Martinez; Endrina Alvarez	Colombia; Angela Espinosa; Natalia Lozano; Adriana Pinto; Diana Rodriguez
Individual foil	Mariana Gonzalez (VEN)	Yasnay Vargas (CUB)	Misleydis Company (CUB)
Individual foil	Mariana Gonzalez (VEN)	Yasnay Vargas (CUB)	Johana Fuenmayor (VEN)
Team foil	Venezuela; Mariana Gonzalez; Johana Fuenmayor; Marianny Rincones; Yulitza Suarez	Cuba; Adriagne Ribot; Misleydis Company; Yasnay Vargas; Annis Hechevarria	Puerto Rico; Zacha Acosta; Luisa Parrilla; Priscilla Perez; Mariangely Moreno
Individual sabre	Ana Faez (CUB)	Mailyn Gonzalez (CUB)	Yerimar Gutierrez (VEN)
Individual sabre	Ana Faez (CUB)	Mailyn Gonzalez (CUB)	Alejandra Benítez (VEN)
Team sabre	Cuba; Mailyn Gonzalez; Ana Faez; Jennifer Morales; Haidys Marquez	Venezuela; Alejandra Benítez; Yerimar Gutierrez; Nulexis Gonzalez; Jenny Nieves	Colombia; Nancy Vanegas; Susana Vergara; Maria Arevalo; Diana Hoyos

== Medal table ==
* Host nation (Colombia)

Rank	Nation	Gold	Silver	Bronze	Total
1	Cuba	7	4	4	15
2	Venezuela	5	5	7	17
3	Colombia*	0	1	3	4
4	Mexico	0	1	1	2
5	Panama	0	1	0	1
6	Puerto Rico	0	0	3	3
Totals (6 entries)		12	12	18	42
