= Igor Tikhomirov =

Igor Tikhomirov may refer to:

- Igor Tikhomirov (fencer) (born 1963), Canadian (formerly Soviet) épée fencer
- Igor Tikhomirov (bassist) (born 1961), Russian musician, member of Kino (band)
