= Fencing at the 2003 Pan American Games =

This page shows the results of the Fencing Competition for men and women at the 2003 Pan American Games, held from August 2 to August 7, 2003, in Santo Domingo, Dominican Republic.

== Results ==
=== Men's competition ===
| Event | Gold | Silver | Bronze |
|---|---|---|---|
Épée
| Individual | (Cuba) Camilo Boris | (Venezuela) Silvio Fernández | (Puerto Rico) Víctor Bernier (Chile) Paris Inostroza |
| Team | Cuba; Camilo Boris; Andrés Carrillo; Nelson Loyola | Venezuela; Rubén Limardo; Silvio Fernández | Puerto Rico; Víctor Bernier; David Bernier; Jonathan Peña; Marcos Peña |
Foil
| Individual | (United States) Dan Kellner | (United States) Jonathan Tiomkin | (Cuba) Raúl Perojo (Cuba) Reinier Suárez |
| Team | United States; Jedediah Dupree; Dan Kellner; Soren Thompson; Jonathan Tiomkin | Cuba; Nelson Loyola; Raúl Perojo; Reinier Suárez; Abraham O'Reilly | Venezuela; Enrique da Silva; Joner Pérez; Carlos Pineda; Carlos Rodríguez |
Sabre
| Individual | (United States) Ivan Lee | (Venezuela) Carlos Bravo | (Canada) Michel Boulos (United States) Jason Rogers |
| Team | United States; Weston Kelsey; Ivan Lee; Jason Rogers; Adam Crompton | Venezuela; Carlos Bravo; Eliézer Rincones; Charles Briceño; Juan Silva | Cuba; Abel Caballero; Yunior Naranjo; Cándido Maya; Abraham O'Reilly |

=== Women's competition ===
| Event | Gold | Silver | Bronze |
|---|---|---|---|
Épée
| Individual | (Cuba) Eimey Gómez | (Canada) Sherraine Schalm | (Venezuela) Endrina Álvarez (Panama) Jesika Jiménez |
| Team | Cuba; Eimey Gómez; Zuleydis Ortiz; Misleidis Oña | United States; Kelley Hurley; Stephanie Eim; Elisabeth Spilman | Canada; Sherraine Schalm; Catherine Dunnette; Marie-Ève Pelletier |
Foil
| Individual | (Venezuela) Mariana González | (United States) Emily Cross | (Cuba) Arianne Ribot (United States) Erinn Smart |
Sabre
| Individual | (United States) Sada Jacobson | (Venezuela) Alejandra Benítez | (Cuba) Ana Faez (United States) Emily Jacobson |

== Medal table ==
| Rank | Nation | Gold medal | Silver medal | Bronze medal | Total |
|---|---|---|---|---|---|
| 1 | United States | 5 | 3 | 3 | 11 |
| 2 | Cuba | 4 | 1 | 5 | 10 |
| 3 | Venezuela | 1 | 5 | 2 | 8 |
| 4 | Canada | 0 | 1 | 2 | 3 |
| 5 | Puerto Rico | 0 | 0 | 2 | 2 |
| 6 | Chile | 0 | 0 | 1 | 1 |
| 6 | Panama | 0 | 0 | 1 | 1 |
| Totale | | 10 | 10 | 16 | 36 |
