= Yury Gelman =

American fencing coach

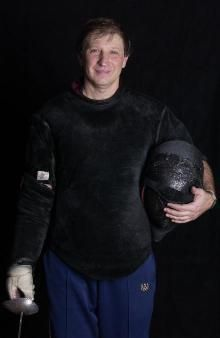

Personal information
- Born: October 13, 1955 (age 70) Kyiv, Ukrainian SSR, Soviet Union
- Home town: Brooklyn, New York

Fencing career
- Sport: Fencing
- Country: United States
- Former country: Soviet Union
- Weapon: Saber
- Hand: Right
- Club: Manhattan Fencing Center

Yury Gelman (born October 13, 1955) is a Ukrainian-born American fencing coach. He is seven-time Olympic fencing coach for the United States, who has coached Team USA in the 2000 Sydney, 2004 Athens, 2008 Beijing, 2012 London, 2016 Rio, 2020 Tokyo, and 2024 Paris Olympics, and US National Men's Saber Coach. Through July 2024, he had coached 19 fencers who became Olympians, six of whom won Olympic medals. Gelman also served as coach of the Ukrainian Fencing Team from 1987 to 1991.

He has also served as Head Fencing Coach for St. John's University for three decades, during which time he has coached 26 NCAA individual champions, and 140 All-Americans. The team won the 2001 NCAA Fencing Championship. Gelman is the founder of the Manhattan Fencing Center in New York City and in Englewood, New Jersey.

== Biography ==
=== Ukraine ===
==== Early years ====
Gelman, who is Jewish, was born in Kyiv, Ukrainian SSR, Soviet Union (now Ukraine), to Wolf and Malvina Gelman. His maternal grandmother was Esther Krakovitch. Wolf and his sister were the only members of their family who survived the Nazi massacre of Jews in the village of Gaisen, Ukraine.

==== Education, fencing, and coaching ====
Gelman started fencing at the age of 10, and enjoyed the strategic element of the sport; he said: "I enjoy setting a trap and feeling like, OK, I’m a little bit better. He’s stronger, but I’m smarter." He fenced foil for the first two years, and then switched weapons and developed into a top saber fencer. ref name=art/> He fenced in high school, during his year and a half of military service in the army, and in college.

He graduated in 1977 from Piddubny Olympic College (Kiev Ukrainian Academy of Sport), with a degree in physical education and coaching of fencing. In 1981 Gelman earned a Master of Sports degree in physical education from the college.

Gelman began teaching fencing to elite athletes in Ukraine. He first began coaching at Piddubny Olympic College after he graduated from the college, and he coached there from 1977 to 1991. Gelman also served as coach of the Ukrainian Fencing Team from 1987 to 1991.

=== United States ===
==== Early years ====
Gelman immigrated to the United States on November 1, 1991, when he was 36 years of age, just before the collapse of the Soviet Union. The driving force for him was that doctors had identified skin complications suffered by his daughter as being due to the effects of the Chernobyl disaster, and advised that her climate should be changed.

He moved first to Philadelphia, Pennsylvania, working odd jobs there, including washing dishes; a step down from his life in Kiev, where he had had a private driver. Then in 1993 he moved to New York. He was not able to find work in the US in fencing straight away, so he spent a year-and-a-half selling doughnuts that he made himself - along with coffee and tea - at a flea market alongside a New Jersey highway. He now lives in Brooklyn, New York.

==== St. John's University ====
Gelman then began serving as the fencing coach at St. John's University in New York City, starting in 1995; he has continued coaching the team (the Red Storm "Johnnies") for 30 years, as of 2024. During that time he has coached 26 NCAA individual champions, and 140 All-Americans. The team won the 2001 NCAA Fencing Championship. As of 2024, his teams had finished in the top seven in the NCAA fencing championships every year for 30 consecutive years through 2024.

==== Manhattan Fencing Center ====
In 2007, he founded the Manhattan Fencing Center in the Garment District, after leaving the Fencers Club where he had previously coached; a number of his students followed him to his new club. As of 2023, it had almost 400 members, 60 of whom fenced foil and the remainder of whom fenced saber. In 2022, Gelman opened another Manhattan Fencing club in Englewood, New Jersey. His daughter, Julia Gelman, and his wife are part of the business.

==== World championships ====
In the 2001 Junior World Championships, Gelman's students Ivan Lee and Tim Hagamen were the first to win gold medals for the United States. The US National Team, under Gelman's leadership, won the 2001 Gdańsk Junior World Championships, the 2004 team Grand Prize, and 5th place at the 2005 Leipzig Senior World Championship.

==== Olympics ====
Gelman has coached the USA Fencing Team at seven Olympic Games (the 2000 Sydney, 2004 Athens, 2008 Beijing, 2012 London, 2016 Rio, 2020 Tokyo, and 2024 Paris Olympics). Through July 2024, he had coached 19 fencers who became Olympians, six of whom won Olympic medals. In addition, in 2008, his men's sabre team won a silver medal in team, and in 2016 his women's sabre team won the bronze medal.

His saber fencers Keeth Smart, the first American male fencer to be ranked number one internationally, and Akhnaten Spencer-El, who was the #1 junior fencer in the world, were on his US team at the 2000 Sydney Olympics. His men's saber fencers took 4th place for the US at the 2004 Athens Olympics, and the silver medal at the 2008 Beijing Olympics.

He coached four of his proteges at the 2008 Beijing Olympics–Keeth Smart, Tim Morehouse, James Williams, and Jason Rogers, and they trained for the competition at his Manhattan Fencing Center. The U.S. men's saber team won the silver medal, its best-ever finish, and its first medal since 1984. Gelman coached Team USA at the 2012 London Olympics, including his fencers Daryl Homer and Dagmara Wozniak–whom he had coached since she was nine years old, and who fenced at the Olympics with a partially torn right Achilles tendon.

In the 2016 Rio Olympics, Daryl Homer, whom he had coached since Homer was 11 years old when Gelman started coaching him pro bono, and then at St. John's, and finally in the Olympics, won an historic individual silver medal in men's sabre fencing. Homer became the first U.S. men's silver medalist since William Grebe in 1904. The U.S. Women's saber team (which included Dagmara Wozniak and Monica Aksamit) won a bronze medal in the women's saber team competition, coached by Gelman. At the 2020 Tokyo Olympics, Gelman again coached Team USA, which included among other his fencers Daryl Homer, Curtis McDowald, and Dagmara Wozniak. Gelman's student Fares Ferjani won the silver medal in men's saber for Tunisia at the 2024 Paris Olympics, with Gelman coaching him. Also at the 2024 Paris Olympics, his fencers Elizabeth Tartakovsky and Maia Chamberlain competed for Team USA in women's saber.

Team USA Olympic saber fencer Elizabeth Tartakovsky is Gelman's great-niece. When she was eight years old, she had watched Gelman coach the United States saber team to the silver medal at the 2008 Olympics on television, and fell in love with the sport. Her parents had emigrated from Kiev to the United States in the early 1990s. Gelman suggested that she try fencing, and she began training under him, and said: "Yury is the closest family we have in the U.S."

=== Philosophy ===
Gelman said, as to his philosophy: "Fencing is life, and life is fencing. All rules are the same. I teach people how to fence and how to live at the same time." He amplified: "Results are not enough. To those you have to match personality and ethics, to be a gentleman, a good person. I try to teach people not only fencing technique, but also how to behave on the piste and in life."

As to his role as a coach, he said: "I am both dad and mom, and the overseer for my students. Sometimes I am very tough, sometimes very soft. We must find our own path to each person. I love my students. First of all, you need to love people, children. Secondly, to love what you do. It is necessary to surrender to this. As soon as you give all of yourself to the cause, you become a good coach."

== Halls of fame and awards ==
Gelman was inducted into US Fencing Hall of Fame on July 10 at the 2010 Summer National Championships in Atlanta. Asked about his induction, he said: "I never pay attention to things like this. It’s not what I’m working for. It’s nice that it happened, but it doesn’t make a big difference." He was also inducted in 2020 into the St. Johns University Hall of Fame.

In 2011 he received the U.S. Olympic Achievement Award from the U.S. Olympic Committee, the U.S. National Governing Bodies for Sport, and the National Association of Collegiate Directors of Athletics. He has also been honored with the title Honored Coach of Ukraine.

== Philanthropy ==
Gelman founded the Yury Gelman Foundation, a not-for-profit. It sponsors both children from low-income families who need financial aid to learn how to fence, as well as elite and Olympic-level athletes. He said: "I want every child who studies with us to become a good member of society through fencing, enter a good university, and graduate from it. This is more important than if he becomes a great athlete; one in a million can become this, and everyone else should become just good people."

== See also ==
- List of USFA Hall of Fame members
