= Monica Aksamit =

American saber fencer

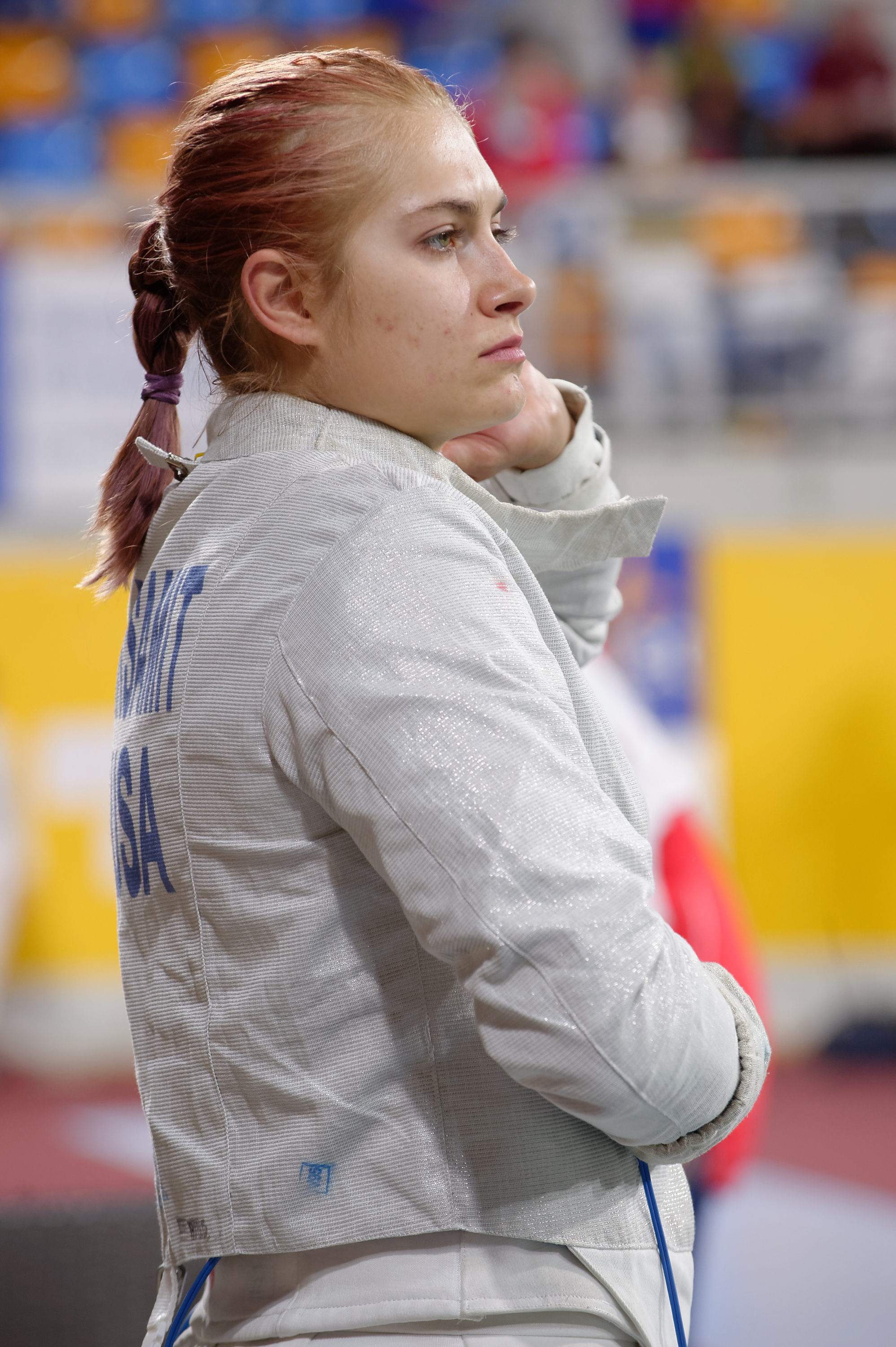
- Aksamit in 2015

Personal information
- Nationality: American
- Born: February 18, 1990 (age 36) New York City, New York, U.S
- Height: 1.83 m (6 ft 0 in)
- Weight: 77 kg (170 lb)

Fencing career
- Sport: Fencing
- Country: United States
- Weapon: saber
- Hand: right-handed
- Club: Manhattan Fencing Center
- Head coach: Yury Gelman
- FIE ranking: current ranking
Medal record
Olympic Games
Bronze medal – third place	2016 Rio de Janeiro	Team
Pan American Games
Gold medal – first place	2019 Lima	Team
Pan American Fencing Championships
Gold medal – first place	2019 Lima	Team
Silver medal – second place	2017 Montreal	Team
Gold medal – first place	2016 Panama City	Team
Gold medal – first place	2009 San Salvador	Team
Bronze medal – third place	2009 San Salvador	Individual
Junior World Fencing Championships
Silver medal – second place	2008 Acireale	Team

Monica Aksamit (born February 18, 1990) is an American former Olympic saber fencer. She represented the United States at the 2016 Summer Olympics, earning a bronze medal in the Women's Saber Team competition. She won a gold medal with Team USA at the 2019 Pan American Games. In 2022, she was a contestant on the dating and relationship reality television series Joe Millionaire: For Richer or Poorer.

== Early life ==
Aksamit was born in New York City, lived in Matawan, New Jersey and Morganville, New Jersey, and since 2020 has lived in Brooklyn, New York. Her mother (Marzena Kaminska) and father (Peter Aksamit), both of whom immigrated to the United States from Poland, divorced when she was nine years old, after which her mother raised her, and she has a half-sister, Olivia. All of her family other than her immediate family lives in Poland. Her parents sent her to live with her grandparents in Poland when she was one and half years old, and she spent some of her younger years living in Poland with her grandparents, while attending pre-school there.

She returned to the United States for kindergarten, and later attended public elementary and middle schools in Matawan. She then attended Matawan Regional High School.

Aksamit then attended Pennsylvania State University (2012) on a full fencing scholarship, majoring in kinesiology. She left before graduating, but went back to finish her degree. She taught fencing at Brookdale Community College and teaches fencing at St. John Vianney High School in Holmdel, New Jersey.

== Fencing career ==
=== Early years ===
Aksamit started fencing when she was nine years old. She began fencing at the Polish-American Fencing School in Linden, New Jersey, under Janusz Mlynek, who coached her in Polish. As she describes her introduction to the sport:

"They handed me a sword. They said, 'Hit the other kid'. I did. Everybody clapped and cheered. I was like, 'I don't understand what's going on. But, okay. This seems like a great time.'"

Her fencing club since she was 15 years old is the Manhattan Fencing Center in Midtown Manhattan, and her coach is Yury Gelman, with whom she has worked since she began training at the club.

During her college fencing career as a Penn State Nittany Lion, Aksamit won two NCAA Team Championships and was the runner-up NCAA Champion in women's saber in 2012. She was a three-time All-American.

=== International competitions ===
Aksamit began representing the United States, for the United States Fencing Association. She won a team silver medal at the 2008 Junior World Fencing Championships in Acireale, Italy, at 18 years of age. She was ranked 12th in the world among juniors, and 16th in the world among seniors, in the 2008–09 season.

In 2009, she won a team gold medal and an individual bronze medal at the Pan American Fencing Championships in San Salvador, El Salvador. In 2012, she underwent knee surgery after competing in the NCAA finals. She helped Team USA win the team gold medal at the 2016 Pan American Fencing Championships in Panama City, Panama.

As the reserve member of Team USA, Aksamit won a bronze medal representing the United States at the 2016 Summer Olympics in the Women's Saber Team competition, in Rio de Janeiro, Brazil. She was subbed in the bronze medal match against Italy. She had fractured a vertebra in her back training for the Olympics, so she had to wear a back brace to compete in the Games.

The following year, Aksamit won a silver medal with Team USA at the 2017 Pan American Fencing Championships in Montreal, Canada. Two years later, she again won a gold medal with Team USA, this time at the 2019 Pan American Games in Lima, Peru. In 2019, strapped for cash as she trained in an effort to again make Team USA for the Olympics, in order to make ends meet she lived with her mother in New Jersey, and worked a number of jobs in between training sessions. She also launched a GoFundMe campaign in September 2019 to cover her training and travel expenses, which raised over $30,000. The United States Olympic Committee gave her a stipend of $300 a month. She narrowly missed qualifying for Team USA for the Tokyo Olympic Games.

== Outside of fencing ==
In 2022, it was announced that she would be a contestant on the Fox television series Joe Millionaire: For Richer or Poorer, an American dating and relationship reality television series featuring 18 women competing for two bachelors, one of whom is secretly a millionaire. She hesitated about accepting appearing on the show, but thought: "Well, love hasn’t really worked out for me. And I don’t know anybody who finds love on dating apps. I feel like I am digging through trash to find the one diamond."

In 2022, she was signed with Ford Models, and had 100,000 Instagram followers.

== See also ==
- List of Olympic women medalists in fencing
- List of Pennsylvania State University Olympians
