= Manhattan Fencing Center =

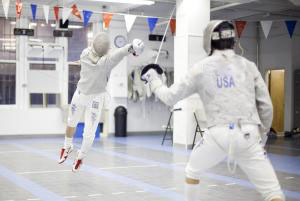
- Saber fencers practicing at Manhattan Fencing Center
- Formation: 2007; 19 years ago
- Founder: Yury Gelman
- Location: 15 West 37th Street, Manhattan, New York City
- Coordinates: 40°45′04″N 73°59′03″W
- Website: manhattanfencing.com

The Manhattan Fencing Center in Manhattan, New York City, was founded in 2007 by Olympic coach Yury Gelman.

== Fencing Foundation of America ==
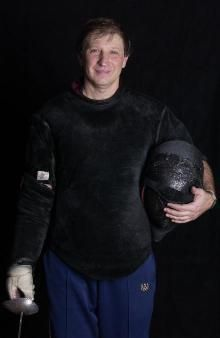
Yury Gelman

Manhattan Fencing Center is the home of the Fencing Foundation of America.

== Notable fencers ==
- Monica Aksamit (born 1990), saber fencer; won a bronze medal at the 2016 Summer Olympics in the Women's Saber Team competition.
- Daryl Homer (born 1990), saber fencer; competed in the 2012 Summer Olympics and the 2016 Summer Olympics; won the silver medal in individual saber at the 2016 Olympics, was a silver medalist at the 2015 World Fencing Championships, and is a five-time gold medalist at the Pan American Fencing Championships.
- Timothy Morehouse (born 1978), saber fencer who won a silver medal competing in the men's saber as a member of the United States fencing team at the 2008 Summer Olympics in Beijing.
- Dagmara Wozniak (born 1988), saber fencer; named to the U.S. Olympic team at the 2008 Summer Olympics in women's saber competition as a substitute, and as a competitor at the 2012 and 2016 Summer Olympics, in which she won a bronze medal.

== See also ==
- Fencing (practice and techniques)
- United States Fencing Association
