= Ana Faez =

Cuban fencer (born 1972)

Personal information
- Born: 14 June 1972 (age 54)

Sport
- Sport: Fencing
Medal record
Representing Cuba
Pan American Games
| Gold medal – first place | 2007 Rio de Janeiro | Team sabre |
| Bronze medal – third place | 2003 Santo Domingo | Individual sabre |
Central American and Caribbean Games
| Gold medal – first place | 2006 Cartagena | Individual sabre |
| Gold medal – first place | 2006 Cartagena | Team sabre |

Ana Faez Miclin (born 14 June 1972) is a Cuban fencer. She competed in the women's individual sabre event at the 2004 Summer Olympics.
