= Fencing at the 2019 Pan American Games – Men's sabre =

Men's sabre at the 2019 Pan American Games
- Venue: Lima Convention Centre
- Dates: August 7
- Competitors: 18 from 10 nations

Medalists
Gold medal	Daryl Homer	United States
Silver medal	Pascual Di Tella	Argentina
Bronze medal	Harold Rodríguez	Cuba
Bronze medal	Shaul Gordon	Canada

The men's sabre competition of the fencing events at the 2019 Pan American Games was held on August 7 at the Lima Convention Centre.

The sabre competition consisted of a qualification round followed by a single-elimination bracket with a bronze medal match between the two semifinal losers. Fencing was done to 15 touches or to the completion of three three-minute rounds if neither fencer reached 15 touches by then. At the end of time, the higher-scoring fencer was the winner; a tie resulted in an additional one-minute sudden-death time period. This sudden-death period was further modified by the selection of a draw-winner beforehand; if neither fencer scored a touch during the minute, the predetermined draw-winner won the bout.

== Schedule ==
Date	Time	Round
August 7, 2019	11:30	Qualification pools
August 7, 2019	13:30	Round of 16
August 7, 2019	14:30	Quarterfinals
August 7, 2019	16:30	Semifinals
August 7, 2019	18:45	Final

== Results ==
The following are the results of the event.

=== Qualification ===
All 18 fencers were put into three groups of six athletes, were each fencer would have five individual matches. The top 14 athletes overall would qualify for next round.

Rank	Name	Nation	Victories	TG	TR	Dif.	Notes
1	Harold Rodríguez	Cuba	5	25	13	+12	Q
2	Julián Ayala	Mexico	4	24	12	+12	Q
3	Daryl Homer	United States	4	24	14	+10	Q
4	Joseph Polossifakis	Canada	4	24	15	+9	Q
5	Stefano Lucchetti	Argentina	4	23	15	+8	Q
6	José Quintero Heredia	Venezuela	4	23	20	+3	Q
7	Bruno Pekelman	Brazil	3	22	16	+6	Q
8	Luis Correa Vila	Colombia	3	21	15	+6	Q
9	Sebastian Cuellar	Colombia	3	21	17	+4	Q
10	Shaul Gordon	Canada	3	20	18	+2	Q
11	Hansel Rodriguez	Cuba	3	20	19	+1	Q
12	Eli Dershwitz	United States	2	19	20	-1	Q
13	Pascual Di Tella	Argentina	1	16	23	-7	Q
14	Ricardo Álvarez García	Chile	1	15	22	-7	Q
15	Eliecer Romero	Venezuela	1	15	24	-9	
16	Enzo Araki	Brazil	0	11	25	-14	
17	Fabian Huapaya	Peru	0	9	25	-16	
18	Jet Vargas	Peru	0	6	25	-19	

=== Elimination round ===
Round of 16
9	Sebastian Cuellar (COL)	7
8	Luis Correa Vila (COL)	15
5	Stefano Lucchetti (ARG)	9
12	Eli Dershwitz (USA)	15
13	Pascual Di Tella (ARG)	15
4	Joseph Polossifakis (CAN)	12
3	Daryl Homer (USA)	15
14	Ricardo Álvarez García (CHI)	3
11	Hansel Rodriguez (CUB)	10
6	José Quintero Heredia (VEN)	15
7	Bruno Pekelman (BRA)	10
10	Shaul Gordon (CAN)	15

Quarterfinals
1	Harold Rodríguez (CUB)	15
8	Luis Correa Vila (COL)	14
12	Eli Dershwitz (USA)	14
13	Pascual Di Tella (ARG)	15
3	Daryl Homer (USA)	15
6	José Quintero Heredia (VEN)	12
10	Shaul Gordon (CAN)	15
2	Julián Ayala (MEX)	5

Semifinals
1	Harold Rodríguez (CUB)	7
13	Pascual Di Tella (ARG)	15
3	Daryl Homer (USA)	15
10	Shaul Gordon (CAN)	14

Final
13	Pascual Di Tella (ARG)	13
3	Daryl Homer (USA)	15
