= François Cauchon =

Canadian fencer (born 2000)

Personal information
- Nationality: Canadian
- Born: April 26, 2000 (age 26) Montreal, Canada

Sport
- Sport: Fencing
Medal record
Men's fencing
Representing Canada
Pan American Games
| Gold medal – first place | 2023 Santiago | Team sabre |
Pan American Fencing Championships
| Silver medal – second place | 2023 Lima | Team sabre |
| Silver medal – second place | 2022 Ascunción | Team sabre |
Pan American Junior Fencing Championships
| Bronze medal – third place | 2019 Bogotá | Sabre |

François Cauchon (born April 26, 2000) is a Canadian fencer in the sabre discipline. Cauchon has won multiple medals at the Pan American level.

== Career ==
Cauchon's first major international result came in 2019, when he won the silver medal at the Pan American Junior Fencing Championships in Bogotá, Colombia. Cauchon was part of the last two Pan American Fencing Championships sabre team who won the silver medal, losing to the United States each time. In January 2023, Cauchon reached a career high 52nd at a Grand Prix stop in Tunisia. In 2024, Cauchon helped Canada qualify a sabre team for the 2024 Summer Olympics for the first time since 1996. Cauchon was officially named to Canada's 2024 Olympic team in April 2024.

=== Pan American Games ===
Cauchon made his Pan American Games debut at the 2023 Pan American Games in Santiago, Chile. At the 2023 Pan American Games, Cauchon won the gold medal in the men's team sabre event.
