= Eimey Gómez =

Cuban fencer (born 1974)

Personal information
- Born: 26 March 1974 (age 52)

Sport
- Sport: Fencing
Medal record
Representing Cuba
Pan American Games
| Gold medal – first place | 1999 Winnipeg | Team épée |
| Gold medal – first place | 2003 Santo Domingo | Individual épée |
| Gold medal – first place | 2003 Santo Domingo | Team épée |
| Bronze medal – third place | 2007 Rio de Janeiro | Team foil |
Central American and Caribbean Games
| Gold medal – first place | 2006 Cartagena | Team épée |
| Bronze medal – third place | 2006 Cartagena | Individual épée |

Eimey Gómez Chivas (born 26 March 1974) is a Cuban fencer. She competed in the women's individual épée event at the 2004 Summer Olympics.
