= João Souza (fencer) =

Brazilian fencer (born 1983)

Personal information
- Full name: João Antônio de Albuquerque e Souza
- Nationality: Brazil
- Born: 23 August 1983 (age 42) Porto Alegre, Rio Grande do Sul, Brazil
- Height: 1.83 m (6 ft 0 in)
- Weight: 79 kg (174 lb)

Sport
- Sport: Fencing
- Event: Foil
Medal record
Men's fencing
Representing Brazil
Pan American Games
Bronze medal – third place	2007 Rio de Janeiro	Foil

João Antônio de Albuquerque e Souza (born August 23, 1983 in Porto Alegre, Rio Grande do Sul) is a Brazilian foil fencer. Souza represented Brazil at the 2008 Summer Olympics in Beijing, where he competed in the individual foil event. He lost the first preliminary match to Japan's Yuki Ota, with a score of 4–15.

Souza also won a bronze medal for his category at the 2007 Pan American Games in Rio de Janeiro.
