= Edgar Chumacero =

Mexican fencer

Personal information
- Born: 7 February 1980 (age 46) Puebla, Puebla, Mexico

Sport
- Sport: Fencing
Medal record
Men's Fencing
Representing Mexico
Central American and Caribbean Games
Silver medal – second place	2006 Cartagena	Foil

Edgar Chumacero (born 7 February 1980) is a Mexican fencer. He competed in the individual foil event at the 2004 Summer Olympics.
