= 2026 Pan American Cadets and Juniors Fencing Championships =

- Host city: Bogotá, Colombia
- Events: 18
- Dates: 24 February – 1 March

The 2026 Pan American Cadets and Junior Fencing Championships were held in Bogotá, Colombia from February 24 to March 1, 2026.

== Medal summary ==
=== Junior ===
==== Men's events ====
Event	Gold	Silver	Bronze
Épée	Kruz Schembri; U.S. Virgin Islands	Simon Lioznyansky; United States	Daniel Rubin; Canada
Épée	Kruz Schembri; U.S. Virgin Islands	Simon Lioznyansky; United States	Matheus Brandt; Brazil
Foil	Riccardo Sisinni; United States	Xu Jia Bao; Canada	Kruz Schembri; U.S. Virgin Islands
Foil	Riccardo Sisinni; United States	Xu Jia Bao; Canada	Borys Budovskyi; Canada
Sabre	Vince Liu; Brazil	Marcus Pinto; Brazil	Mathis Falcon-Korb; Canada
Sabre	Vince Liu; Brazil	Marcus Pinto; Brazil	Connor Bryce Woodward; Puerto Rico
Team Épée	United States; Gabriel Carrier; Simon Lioznyansky; Jake Mann; Alex Wolfe	Canada; Jackson Fan; Lucas Hu; Shan Junzhe; Daniel Rubin	Mexico; Bravo Daniel Ruakj; Erick Galvan; Arauz Danilo Diaz; Carlos Alexander Romero Kuri Roca
Team Foil	United States; Don Jeidus Deseranno; Nickolas Rusadze; Riccardo Sisinni; Luao Yang	Canada; Borys Budovskyi; Adrian Wong; Xu Jia Bao; Jason Yu	Ecuador; Pedro Jose Aguinaga Procel; Thomas Esteban Aguinaga Procel; Jose Andres Chancusig Cacuango
Team Sabre	United States; Jeein Joo; Elijah Kim; Jonathan Ng; Nicolas Wang	Canada; Mathis Falcon-Korb; Adlai Duncan; William Robinson; Jonas Broening-Chai	Brazil; Vince Liu; Erico Patto; Arthur Wolff; Marcus Pinto

==== Women's events ====
Event	Gold	Silver	Bronze
Épée	Chelsea Chi; United States	Zoe Wang; United States	Serena Jiang; Canada
Épée	Chelsea Chi; United States	Zoe Wang; United States	Catherine Witter; United States
Foil	Iris Yang; United States	Lavender Lee; United States	Ilinca Fetecau; Canada
Foil	Iris Yang; United States	Lavender Lee; United States	Audrey Yang; United States
Sabre	Doris Huang Shang Chen; Canada	Florencia Cabezas; Chile	Callie Wang; United States
Sabre	Doris Huang Shang Chen; Canada	Florencia Cabezas; Chile	Ana Beatriz Fraga; Brazil
Team Épée	United States; Nikita Swenson; Zoe Wang; Catherine Witter; Chelsea Chi	Canada; Bertille Hurel; Serena Jiang; Yanka Sobus; Nancy Xiao	Mexico; Rebecca Hernandez; Barbara Columba Ocegueda; Ekaterine Bautista; Romero Ana Sofía Parra
Team Foil	United States; Melissa Deng; Lavender Lee; Iris Yang; Audrey Yang	Canada; Ilinca Fetecau; Clara Richard; Serene Sakalla; Nicole Wu	Peru; Astrid Bravo; Mariana Soriano; Cielo Vizcarra; Valeria Chipoco
Team Sabre	United States; Charmaine Andres; Korina Leou; Callie Wang; Hanna Gugala	Canada; Katia Barbosa; Doris Huang Shang Chen; Sonia Li; Emma Teng	Mexico; Jazmin Covarrubias; Partida Valeria Gonzalez; María Constanza Martinez Ortega; Vanessa Chavez

=== Cadets ===
==== Men's events ====
Event	Gold	Silver	Bronze
Épée	Shan Junzhe; Canada	Chen Zhengyang; United States	Daniel Rubin; Canada
Épée	Shan Junzhe; Canada	Chen Zhengyang; United States	Ravin Singh; United States
Foil	Xu Jia Bao; Canada	Borys Budovskyi; Canada	Aaron Zhang; United States
Foil	Xu Jia Bao; Canada	Borys Budovskyi; Canada	Ziyu Wang; United States
Sabre	Vince Liu; Brazil	Marcus Pinto; Brazil	Miguel Polo Giraldo; Colombia
Sabre	Vince Liu; Brazil	Marcus Pinto; Brazil	Deven Mattoo; Puerto Rico

==== Women's events ====
Event	Gold	Silver	Bronze
Épée	Yanka Sobus; Canada	Valeria Escobar Navarro; Venezuela	Ivanna Georgina Perez; Mexico
Épée	Yanka Sobus; Canada	Valeria Escobar Navarro; Venezuela	Serena Jiang; Canada
Foil	Ilinca Fetecau; Canada	Melissa Deng; United States	Valentina Basso; Brazil
Foil	Ilinca Fetecau; Canada	Melissa Deng; United States	Ivy Zhang; United States
Sabre	Emma Teng; Canada	Arya Chavan; United States	Doris Huang Shang Chen; Canada
Sabre	Emma Teng; Canada	Arya Chavan; United States	Yuwei Wu; Canada

== Medal table ==
* Host nation (Colombia)

Rank	Nation	Gold	Silver	Bronze	Total
1	United States	9	6	7	22
2	Canada	6	8	9	23
3	Brazil	2	2	4	8
4	U.S. Virgin Islands	1	0	1	2
5	Chile	0	1	0	1
5	Venezuela	0	1	0	1
7	Mexico	0	0	4	4
8	Puerto Rico	0	0	2	2
9	Colombia*	0	0	1	1
9	Ecuador	0	0	1	1
9	Peru	0	0	1	1
Totals (11 entries)		18	18	30	66
