= Hanna Thompson =

American fencer

Personal information
- Born: November 1, 1983 (age 42) Rochester, New York, U.S.
Medal record
Women's Fencing
Representing the United States
Olympic Games
Silver medal – second place	2008 Beijing	Foil Team
Pan American Games
Silver medal – second place	2007 Rio de Janeiro	Foil
Silver medal – second place	2007 Rio de Janeiro	Sabre Team

Hanna Thompson (born November 1, 1983, in Rochester, New York) is an American foil and sabre fencer who was a member of the 2008 Olympics U.S. Women's foil team, which won the silver medal.

A 2006 graduate of Ohio State University, Thompson was a four-time NCAA All-America and helped the Buckeyes capture the 2004 NCAA National Championship. Thompson also placed third individually at the NCAA Championships in 2002 and 2004 and helped Ohio State capture four consecutive Midwest Championship titles.

Thompson has also competed with six national teams and two junior squads, earning a third-place team medal at the 2003 Junior World Championships in Trapani, Italy. In 2005, she won a Senior National Championship with the Rochester Fencing Club and also helped that squad bring in five senior team titles.

Thompson served as a volunteer assistant coach at Ohio State from 2005–07 and assistant coach at Duke from 2009-2010.

She graduated from Golden Gate University law school and passed the State Bar of California in 2013, and the State Bar of Hawaii in 2015. She currently works as a litigator.

== Competition record ==
- 2008 - Member of the U.S. Olympic Team, Beijing, China
- 2007 - Pan American Games, Rio de Janeiro, Brazil - silver medal individual
- 2005 - National Champion

== See also ==
- List of USFA Hall of Fame members
