= Fencing at the 2007 Pan American Games =

This page shows the results of the Fencing Competition for men and women at the 2007 Pan American Games, which will be held from July 14 to July 21, 2007, in the Pavilion 3 of the Riocentro Sports Complex in Rio de Janeiro, Brazil. It has a seating capacity of 2,000.

== Men's competition ==
=== Epée ===
- Held on 2007-07-16

Quarterfinals
Andrés Carrillo (CUB)	15
Carlos Hernández (NCA)	12
Paris Inostroza (CHI)	15
Weston Kelsey (USA)	10
Silvio Fernández (VEN)	15
Igor Tikhomirov (CAN)	11
Rubén Limardo (VEN)	15
Cody Mattern (USA)	4

Semifinals
Andrés Carrillo (CUB)	15
Paris Inostroza (CHI)	8
Silvio Fernández (VEN)	14
Rubén Limardo (VEN)	15

Final
Andrés Carrillo (CUB)	10
Rubén Limardo (VEN)	11

=== Foil ===
- Held on 2007-07-14

Quarterfinals
Felipe Alvear (CHI)	15
Felipe Saucedo (ARG)	9
Carlos Rodríguez (VEN)	15
Marcos Peña (PUR)	6
Andras Horanyi (USA)	13
Heitor Shimbo (BRA)	10
João Souza (BRA)	15
Marek Wojcik (CAN)	8

Semifinals
Felipe Alvear (CHI)	15
Carlos Rodríguez (VEN)	10
Andras Horanyi (USA)	15
João Souza (BRA)	9

Final
Felipe Alvear (CHI)	4
Andras Horanyi (USA)	15

=== Sabre ===
- Held on 2007-07-18

Quarterfinals
Renzo Agresta (BRA)	15
Benjamin Igoe (USA)	14
Philippe Beaudry (CAN)	15
Leonidas Marroquin (ESA)	11
Nicolas Mayer (CAN)	15
Alexander Achten (ARG)	14
James Williams (USA)	15
Daylor Díaz (CUB)	8

Semifinals
Renzo Agresta (BRA)	12
Philippe Beaudry (CAN)	15
Nicolas Mayer (CAN)	9
James Williams (USA)	15

Final
Philippe Beaudry (CAN)	15
James Williams (USA)	7

=== Team Epée ===
- Held on 2007-07-20

Quarterfinals
1	Cuba	45
8	Brazil	18
4	United States	45
5	Puerto Rico	35
2	Canada	45
7	Chile	37
3	Venezuela	43
6	Argentina	22

Semifinals
Cuba	45
United States	26
Canada	32
Venezuela	41

Final
Cuba	45
Venezuela	34
Third place
United States	45
Canada	42

=== Team Sabre ===
- Held on 2007-07-21

Quarterfinals
1	Canada	45
8	Mexico	25
4	Cuba	45
5	El Salvador	32
2	Argentina	45
7	Venezuela	33
3	United States	45
6	Brazil	16

Semifinals
Canada	45
Cuba	40
Argentina	39
United States	45

Final
Canada	35
United States	45
Third place
Cuba	35
Argentina	45

== Women's competition ==
=== Epée ===
- Held on 2007-07-17

Quarterfinals
Angela Espinoza (COL)	15
Cáterin Bravo (CHI)	13
Courtney Hurley (USA)	15
Eimey Gómez (CUB)	13
Julie Leprohon (CAN)	13
Zuleydis Ortiz (CUB)	11
Clarisse Menezes (BRA)	15
Sherraine Schalm (CAN)	13

Semifinals
Angela Espinoza (COL)	7
Courtney Hurley (USA)	15
Julie Leprohon (CAN)	15
Clarisse Menezes (BRA)	6

Final
Courtney Hurley (USA)	15
Julie Leprohon (CAN)	14

=== Foil ===
- Held on 2007-07-15

Quarterfinals
Misleydis Compañy (CUB)	15
Elise Daoust (CAN)	6
Mariana González (VEN)	13
Alejandra Carbone (ARG)	7
Monica Kwan (CAN)	15
Johana Fuenmayor (VEN)	11
Hanna Thompson (USA)	15
Flavia Mormandi (ARG)	3

Semifinals
Misleydis Compañy (CUB)	6
Mariana González (VEN)	15
Monica Kwan (CAN)	14
Hanna Thompson (USA)	15

Final
Mariana González (VEN)	13
Hanna Thompson (USA)	12

=== Sabre ===
- Held on 2007-07-19

Quarterfinals
Emma Baratta (USA)	15
Estefania Berninsone (ARG)	8
Alexis Jemal (USA)	15
María Belén Pérez (ARG)	5
Mailyn González (CUB)	15
Alejandra Benítez (VEN)	9
Sandra Sassine (CAN)	15
Julie Cloutier (CAN)	7

Semifinals
Emma Baratta (USA)	7
Alexis Jemal (USA)	15
Mailyn González (CUB)	15
Sandra Sassine (CAN)	12

Final
Alexis Jemal (USA)	12
Mailyn González (CUB)	15

=== Team Foil ===
- Held on 2007-07-20

Quarterfinals
1	Canada	45
8	Bolivia	24
4	Cuba	45
5	Puerto Rico	25
2	Brazil	45
7	Argentina	42
3	Venezuela	45
6	Mexico	27

Semifinals
Canada	45
Cuba	27
Brazil	31
Venezuela	45

Final
Canada	34
Venezuela	45
Third place
Cuba	45
Brazil	31

=== Team Sabre ===
- Held on 2007-07-21

Quarterfinals
1	Cuba	45
8	Mexico	26
4	Canada	45
5	Puerto Rico	19
2	United States
7	BYE
3	Venezuela	45
6	Argentina	39

Semifinals
Cuba	45
Canada	37
United States	45
Venezuela	34

Final
Cuba	45
United States	39
Third place
Canada	45
Venezuela	44

== Medal table ==
Place	Nation	Gold medal	Silver medal	Bronze medal	Total
1	United States	3	4	2	9
2	Cuba	3	1	2	6
2	Venezuela	3	1	2	6
4	Canada	1	3	4	8
5	Chile	0	1	1	2
6	Brazil	0	0	3	3
7	Argentina	0	0	1	1
7	Colombia	0	0	1	1
Total		10	10	16	36
