= Joseph Polossifakis =

Canadian fencer (born 1990)

Joseph Polossifakis OLY
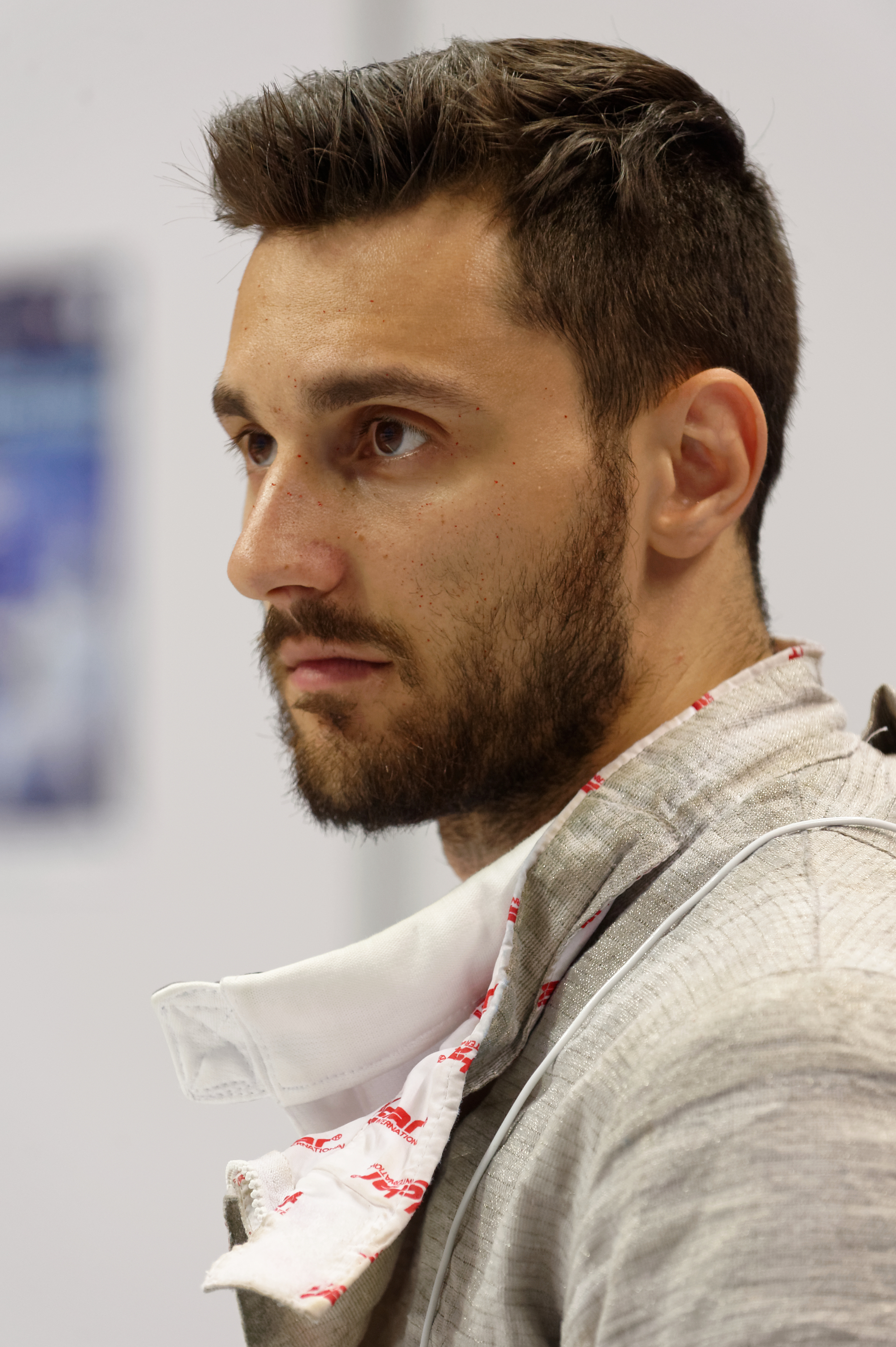

Personal information
- Born: August 21, 1990 (age 36) Montreal, Quebec, Canada
- Home town: Montreal, Quebec, Canada
- Height: 172 cm (5 ft 8 in)
- Weight: 91 kg (201 lb)

Fencing career
- Sport: Fencing
- Country: Canada
- Weapon: sabre
- Hand: left-handed
- FIE ranking: current ranking
Medal record
Pan American Games
Silver medal – second place	2011 Guadalajara	Team
Silver medal – second place	2015 Toronto	Individual
Silver medal – second place	2015 Toronto	Team
Silver medal – second place	2019 Lima	Team
Bronze medal – third place	2011 Guadalajara	Individual
Pan American Championships
Gold medal – first place	2012 Cancun	Individual sabre

Joseph Polossifakis (born August 21, 1990) is a Canadian male sabre fencer. Polossifakis is a multiple time Pan American Games medallist and is also a former Pan American Championships silver medallist.

Joseph Polossifakis qualified to represent his country at the 2016 Summer Olympics, by being ranked in the top two in the Americas, outside the top 14.
