= 2025 Pan American Cadets and Juniors Fencing Championships =

- Host city: Asunción, Paraguay
- Events: 18
- Dates: 24 February – 1 March

The 2025 Pan American Cadets and Junior Fencing Championships were held in Asunción, Paraguay from February 24 to March 1, 2025.

== Medal summary ==
=== Junior ===
==== Men's events ====
Event	Gold	Silver	Bronze
Épée	Kruz Schembri; U.S. Virgin Islands	Simon Lioznyansky; United States	Junzhe (Simon) Shan; Canada
Épée	Kruz Schembri; U.S. Virgin Islands	Simon Lioznyansky; United States	Daniel Rubin; Canada
Foil	Castor Kao; United States	Maximo Azuela; Mexico	Leon Wujastyk; Canada
Foil	Castor Kao; United States	Maximo Azuela; Mexico	Caleb Jeon; United States
Sabre	Nicolas Wang; United States	Lukas Eichhorn; Peru	Carter Berrio; United States
Sabre	Nicolas Wang; United States	Lukas Eichhorn; Peru	Emilio Vargas; Colombia
Team Épée	United States; Alexander Fray; Samuel Imrek; Elijah Imrek; Simon Lioznyansky	Panama; Johan Achurra; Caleb Caldito Chan; Isaac Dorati; Juan Jose Gomez Ng	Argentina; Vlad Beauchamp; Francisco Lucio Fiamingo; Ivan Salvador Groupierre; Jose Alejandro Zemborain Navajas
Team Foil	United States; Jayden Hooshi; Caleb Jeon; Castor Kao; Richard Li	Ecuador; Thomas Esteban Aguinaga Procel; Pedro Jose Aguinaga Procel; Jose Andres Chancusig Cacuango; Jose Antonio Delgado Aguirre	Canada; Charlie Chen; Toby Muhua Li; Zixian Liu; Leon Wujastyk
Team Sabre	United States; Michael Andres; Carter Berrio; Heonjun Cheong; Nicolas Wang	Canada; Abtin Abbasi; Mathis Falcon-Korb; Colin Noble; Daniel Tiagi	Colombia; Salomon Anzola; Oscar Niño; Juan Pacheco; Emilio Vargas

==== Women's events ====
Event	Gold	Silver	Bronze
Épée	Ruien Xiao; Canada	Leehi Machulsky; United States	Jolie Korfonta; United States
Épée	Ruien Xiao; Canada	Leehi Machulsky; United States	Victoria Guerrero Hidalgo; Venezuela
Foil	Aileen Mi; United States	Sarah Mei; United States	Audrey Yang; United States
Foil	Aileen Mi; United States	Sarah Mei; United States	Ha-Eune Adelle Chun; Canada
Sabre	Katherine Andres; United States	Gabriela Maria Lin Hwang; Puerto Rico	Arianna Prieto Jimenez; Venezuela
Sabre	Katherine Andres; United States	Gabriela Maria Lin Hwang; Puerto Rico	Liu Zhi Jun; Canada
Team Épée	Canada; Yanka Sobus; Ruien Xiao; Nancy Xiao; Julia Yin	United States; Jolie Korfonta; Leehi Machulsky; Tanishka Padhye; Zoe Wang	Venezuela; Valeria Escobar Navarro; Victoria Guerrero Hidalgo; Victoria Perez Henriquez; Maria Tuozzo Tortolero
Team Foil	United States; Chin-Yi Kong; Sarah Mei; Aileen Mi; Audrey Yang	Canada; Ha-Eune Adelle Chun; Angela Dong; Felice Hu; Fu Jiao Melody Tang	Mexico; Frida Espinosa; Angela Hernández; Georgina Morales; Cruz Maria Rodriguez
Team Sabre	Mexico; Alejandra Beltran; Vanessa Chavez; Jazmin Covarrubias; Partida Valeria Gonzalez	United States; Charmaine Andres; Katherine Andres; Aishwarya Merchant	Puerto Rico; Sophia Baez Feliciano; Kiana A. Blas Reyes; Mirka Amelie Bonis-Ramirez; Gabriela Maria Lin Hwang

=== Cadets ===
==== Men's events ====
Event	Gold	Silver	Bronze
Épée	Junzhe (Simon) Shan; Canada	Caleb Caldito Chan; Panama	Lucas Hu; Canada
Épée	Junzhe (Simon) Shan; Canada	Caleb Caldito Chan; Panama	Sebastian Bereche; Peru
Foil	Zixian Liu; Canada	Thomas Esteban Aguinaga Procel; Ecuador	Charlie Chen; Canada
Foil	Zixian Liu; Canada	Thomas Esteban Aguinaga Procel; Ecuador	Noel Song; United States
Sabre	Arthur Wolff; Brazil	Gaspar Latham; Chile	Salomon Anzola; Colombia
Sabre	Arthur Wolff; Brazil	Gaspar Latham; Chile	Andrew Chang Wang; Canada

==== Women's events ====
Event	Gold	Silver	Bronze
Épée	Julia Yin; Canada	Nancy Xiao; Canada	Sofía Echeverry; Colombia
Épée	Julia Yin; Canada	Nancy Xiao; Canada	Pietra Brazolin; Brazil
Foil	Ha-Eune Adelle Chun; Canada	Audrey Yang; United States	Natalia Machado Leal; Venezuela
Foil	Ha-Eune Adelle Chun; Canada	Audrey Yang; United States	Livia Burberry; Brazil
Sabre	Jazmin Covarrubias; Mexico	Florencia Cabezas; Chile	Liu Yifei; Canada
Sabre	Jazmin Covarrubias; Mexico	Florencia Cabezas; Chile	Riley Crooks; Canada

== Medal table ==
* Host nation (Paraguay)

Rank	Nation	Gold	Silver	Bronze	Total
1	United States	8	6	5	19
2	Canada	6	3	11	20
3	Mexico	2	1	1	4
4	Brazil	1	0	2	3
5	U.S. Virgin Islands	1	0	0	1
6	Chile	0	2	0	2
6	Ecuador	0	2	0	2
6	Panama	0	2	0	2
9	Peru	0	1	1	2
9	Puerto Rico	0	1	1	2
11	Colombia	0	0	4	4
11	Venezuela	0	0	4	4
13	Argentina	0	0	1	1
Totals (13 entries)		18	18	30	66
