= Fares Arfa =

Canadian fencer (born 1994)

Personal information
- Nationality: Canada
- Born: October 16, 1994 (age 31) Béjaïa, Algeria
- Home town: Laval, Quebec, Canada
- Height: 188 cm (6 ft 2 in)
- Weight: 90 kg (198 lb)

Sport
- Sport: Fencing
- College team: Ohio State University
Medal record
Men's fencing
Representing Canada
Pan American Games
Gold medal – first place	2023 Santiago	Team sabre
Silver medal – second place	2019 Lima	Team sabre
Bronze medal – third place	2023 Santiago	Sabre
Pan American Fencing Championships
Silver medal – second place	2025 Rio de Janeiro	Team
Silver medal – second place	2024 Lima	Team Sabre
Silver medal – second place	2023 Lima	Team sabre
Silver medal – second place	2022 Ascuncion	Team sabre
Silver medal – second place	2019 Toronto	Team sabre
Silver medal – second place	2018 Havana	Team sabre
Silver medal – second place	2017 Montreal	Team sabre
Bronze medal – third place	2024 Lima	Sabre
Pan American Junior Fencing Championships
Gold medal – first place	2014 Guatemala City	Sabre

Farès Arfa (born October 16, 1994) is a Canadian fencer in the sabre discipline. Arfa has won multiple medals at the Pan American level. At the Paris 2024 Olympics he fenced in both the Individual Sabre event as well as the Team Sabre event.

== Career ==
Arfa's first major international result came in 2014, when he won the gold medal at the Pan American Junior Fencing Championships in Guatemala City. Arfa was part of the last five Pan American Fencing Championships sabre team who won the silver medal, losing to the United States each time. At the 2022 World Fencing Championships in Cairo, Egypt, Arfa finished 16th in the individual event, the highest placing for Arfa at the event.

=== Pan American Games ===
Arfa has won a medal of each colour at the Pan American Games. Arfa made his Pan American Games debut at the 2019 Pan American Games in Lima, Peru, where he won the silver medal in the team sabre event. Four years later Arfa was named to his second Pan American Games team. At the 2023 Pan American Games, Arfa won the gold medal in the men's team sabre event and the bronze medal in the individual event.

=== 2024 Olympics ===
In 2024, Arfa helped Canada qualify a sabre team for the 2024 Summer Olympics for the first time since 1996. Arfa was officially named to Canada's 2024 Olympic team in April 2024. In the first round of the men's individual sabre competition, Arfa defeated three-time reigning Olympic champion Áron Szilágyi of Hungary by 15-8, serving Szilágyi his first Olympic defeat since 2008. He then won his second round match against Boladé Apithy of France by 15-8 before falling in the quarterfinal 13-15 to the South Korean former world champion and eventual gold medalist Oh Sang-uk. During the 2024 Paris Olympics Arfa led the Canadian Men's Sabre Team to finish 8th. Additionally, as an individual Arfa made it to the quarter finals.
