= 2024 Pan American Cadets and Juniors Fencing Championships =

2024 Pan American Cadets and Junior Fencing Championships
- Host city: Rio de Janeiro, Brazil
- Events: 18
- Dates: 22 – 27 February
- Main venue: Carioca Arena 1

The 2024 Pan American Cadets and Junior Fencing Championships were held in Rio de Janeiro, Brazil at the Carioca Arena 1 from February 22nd to 27th, 2024.

== Medal summary ==
=== Medal table ===
* Host nation (Brazil)

| Rank | Nation | Gold | Silver | Bronze | Total |
|---|---|---|---|---|---|
| 1 | United States | 14 | 8 | 13 | 35 |
| 2 | Puerto Rico | 2 | 1 | 0 | 3 |
| 3 | Canada | 1 | 4 | 7 | 12 |
| 4 | U.S. Virgin Islands | 1 | 0 | 1 | 2 |
| 5 | Mexico | 0 | 3 | 4 | 7 |
| 6 | Brazil* | 0 | 2 | 1 | 3 |
| 7 | Venezuela | 0 | 0 | 2 | 2 |
| 8 | Colombia | 0 | 0 | 1 | 1 |
| 8 | Panama | 0 | 0 | 1 | 1 |
| Totals (9 entries) | | 18 | 18 | 30 | 66 |

=== Junior ===
==== Men's events ====
| Event | Gold | Silver | Bronze |
|---|---|---|---|
| Foil | Kruz Schembri; U.S. Virgin Islands | Nickolas Rusadze; United States | Richard Li; United States |
| Foil | Kruz Schembri; U.S. Virgin Islands | Nickolas Rusadze; United States | Maximo Azuela; Mexico |
| Épée | Samuel Imrek; United States | Alexander Moses; United States | Hunter Wei; Canada |
| Épée | Samuel Imrek; United States | Alexander Moses; United States | Kruz Schembri; U.S. Virgin Islands |
| Sabre | Silas Choi; United States | Adrian Figueredo Suliveres; Puerto Rico | Matthew Teng; Canada |
| Sabre | Silas Choi; United States | Adrian Figueredo Suliveres; Puerto Rico | Shaun Kim; United States |
| Team Foil | United States; Richard Li; Nickolas Rusadze; Kian Dierks; Conrad Lo | Canada; Jason B Park; Jason Yu; Spencer Orr; Xinhao Xu | Mexico; Maximo Murray; Michael Alexzander Vázquez; Maximo Azuela; Bryan Vargas |
| Team Épée | United States; Alexander Fray; Alexander Moses; Daniel Chirashnya; Samuel Imrek | Mexico; Victor Humberto Enciso; Carlos Romero; Ismael Chávez; Erick Quetzalcoatl Galvan | Panama; Isaac Daniel Dorati; Johan Alessandro Achurra; Juan José Gómez |
| Team Sabre | United States; Shaun Kim; Andrei Nazlymov; Silas Choi; Nicolas Wang | Brazil; Dylan Ikuno; Renato Saliba; Matheus Becker; Érico Patto | Venezuela; Simon Antonio Duran; Moises Molina; Pedro Clemente; Kevin Jiménez |

==== Women's events ====
| Event | Gold | Silver | Bronze |
|---|---|---|---|
| Foil | Victoria Pevzner; United States | Alexandra Nissinoff; United States | Chin-Yi Kong; United States |
| Foil | Victoria Pevzner; United States | Alexandra Nissinoff; United States | Mikayla Chusid; United States |
| Épée | Leehi Machulsky; United States | Victoria Doroshkevich; United States | Sophia Jakel; United States |
| Épée | Leehi Machulsky; United States | Victoria Doroshkevich; United States | Victoria Guerrero Hidalgo; Venezuela |
| Sabre | Gabriela Maria Hwang; Puerto Rico | Madeline Engelman-Sanz; United States | Julie Xiao; Canada |
| Sabre | Gabriela Maria Hwang; Puerto Rico | Madeline Engelman-Sanz; United States | Isabela Carvalho; Brazil |
| Team Foil | United States; Victoria Pevzner; Chin-Yi Kong; Alanna Xue | Mexico; Angela Hernández; Jimena Torres; Alondra María Estrada; Georgina Morales | Canada; Angela Dong; Ada Yao; Ellie Davies; Zhi Tong Lin |
| Team Épée | United States; Sophia Jakel; Leehi Machulsky; Victoria Doroshkevich; Zoe Kim | Canada; Alexa Dubeau; Amy Ai; Jarynne Valerie Qi | Colombia; Carmen Correa; Isabella Malagon; Paula Isabella Castro; Isabella González |
| Team Sabre | United States; Charmaine Andres; Nisha Hild; Cathleen Shi; Madeline Engelman-Sanz | Canada; Julie Xiao; Ashley Chen; Maria Shtrevensky; Xiaohan Chen | Mexico; Ingrid Mendiola; Alejandra Beltran; Vanessa Frine; Natalia Castillo |

=== Cadets ===
==== Men's events ====
| Event | Gold | Silver | Bronze |
|---|---|---|---|
| Foil | Nickolas Rusadze; United States | Conrad Lo; United States | Alexander Wu; United States |
| Foil | Nickolas Rusadze; United States | Conrad Lo; United States | Richard Li; United States |
| Épée | Sullivan Kim; United States | Carlos Romero; Mexico | Daniel Chirashnya; United States |
| Épée | Sullivan Kim; United States | Carlos Romero; Mexico | Victor Humberto Enciso; Mexico |
| Sabre | Luke Vaid; United States | Daniel Lin; United States | Yu Peng Zhang; Canada |
| Sabre | Luke Vaid; United States | Daniel Lin; United States | Lawrence Liu; Canada |

==== Women's events ====
| Event | Gold | Silver | Bronze |
|---|---|---|---|
| Foil | Mikayla Chusid; United States | Alileen Mi; United States | Viviene Goor; United States |
| Foil | Mikayla Chusid; United States | Alileen Mi; United States | Alexandra Nissinoff; United States |
| Épée | Amy Ai; Canada | Laura Correia; Brazil | Katherine Nemeth; United States |
| Épée | Amy Ai; Canada | Laura Correia; Brazil | Alysa Jakel; United States |
| Sabre | Gabriela Maria Hwang; Puerto Rico | Julia Shi; Canada | Isabella Favo; United States |
| Sabre | Gabriela Maria Hwang; Puerto Rico | Julia Shi; Canada | Li Jiaying; Canada |
