= Fencing at the 2023 Pan American Games – Men's sabre =

Men's sabre at the 2023 Pan American Games
- Venue: Paralympic Training Center
- Dates: November 1
- Competitors: 19 from 10 nations

Medalists
Gold medal	Andrew Doddo	United States
Silver medal	Eliécer Romero	Venezuela
Bronze medal	Fares Arfa	Canada
Bronze medal	Shaul Gordon	Canada

The men's sabre competition of the fencing events at the 2023 Pan American Games was held on November 1 at the Paralympic Training Center.

The sabre competition consisted of a qualification round followed by a single-elimination bracket with a bronze medal match between the two semifinal losers. Fencing was done to 15 touches or to the completion of three three-minute rounds if neither fencer reached 15 touches by then. At the end of time, the higher-scoring fencer was the winner; a tie resulted in an additional one-minute sudden-death time period. This sudden-death period was further modified by the selection of a draw-winner beforehand; if neither fencer scored a touch during the minute, the predetermined draw-winner won the bout.

== Schedule ==
Date	Time	Round
November 1, 2023	12:40	Qualification pools
November 1, 2023	14:40	Round of 16
November 1, 2023	15:55	Quarterfinals
November 1, 2023	17:30	Semifinals
November 1, 2023	18:40	Final

== Results ==
The following are the results of the event.

=== Qualification ===
All 18 fencers were put into three groups of six athletes, were each fencer would have five individual matches. The top 14 athletes overall would qualify for next round.

Rank	Name	Nation	Victories	TG	TR	Dif.	Notes
1	Fares Arfa	Canada	6	30	12	+18	Q
2	José Quintero	Venezuela	5	25	13	+12	Q
3	Shaul Gordon	Canada	4	24	14	+10	Q
4	Filip Dolegiewicz	United States	4	24	16	+8	Q
5	Roberto Monsalva	Chile	4	22	18	+4	Q
6	Stefano Lucchetti	Argentina	4	25	18	+7	Q
7	Andrew Doddo	United States	4	25	20	+5	Q
8	Pascual Di Tella	Argentina	3	22	16	+6	Q
9	Gibrán Zea	Mexico	3	23	19	+4	Q
10	Luis Correa Vila	Colombia	2	19	20	-1	Q
11	Sebastian Cuellar	Colombia	2	19	21	-2	Q
12	Eliécer Romero	Venezuela	2	18	21	-3	Q
12	Enrico Pezzi	Brazil	2	18	21	-3	Q
14	Fabián Huapaya	Peru	2	16	26	-10	Q
15	Hudson Santana	Puerto Rico	2	14	24	-10	Q
16	Brandon Romo	Mexico	1	18	24	-6	Q
17	Henrique Garrigós	Brazil	1	10	22	-12	
18	Ricardo Álvarez García	Chile	0	12	25	-13	
19	Hender Medina	Venezuela	0	16	30	-14	

=== Elimination round ===
Round of 16
1	Fares Arfa (CAN)	15
16	Brandon Romo (MEX)	8
9	Gibrán Zea (MEX)	13
8	Pascual Di Tella (ARG)	15
5	Roberto Monsalva (CHI)	15
12	Enrico Pezzi (BRA)	11
13	Eliécer Romero (VEN)	15
4	Filip Dolegiewicz (USA)	10
3	Shaul Gordon (CAN)	15
14	Fabián Huapaya (PER)	11
11	Sebastian Cuellar (COL)	15
6	Stefano Lucchetti (ARG)	13
7	Andrew Doddo (USA)	15
10	Luis Correa Vila (COL)	12
15	Hudson Santana (PUR)	5
2	José Quintero (VEN)	15

Quarterfinals
1	Fares Arfa (CAN)	15
9	Pascual Di Tella (ARG)	12
5	Roberto Monsalva (CHI)	4
13	Eliécer Romero (VEN)	15
3	Shaul Gordon (CAN)	15
11	Sebastian Cuellar (COL)	10
7	Andrew Doddo (USA)	15
2	José Quintero (VEN)	9

Semifinals
1	Fares Arfa (CAN)	12
13	Eliécer Romero (VEN)	15
3	Shaul Gordon (CAN)	8
7	Andrew Doddo (USA)	15

Final
13	Eliécer Romero (VEN)	11
7	Andrew Doddo (USA)	15
