= 2011 Pan American Fencing Championships =

The 2011 Pan American Fencing Championships were held in Reno, Nevada, United States from 4 to 10 July at the Reno-Sparks Convention Center.

== Medal summary ==
=== Men's events ===
Event	Gold	Silver	Bronze
Foil	Race Imboden (USA)	Alexander Massialas (USA)	Daniel Gómez (MEX); Gerek Meinhardt (USA)
Épée	Soren Thompson (USA)	Rubén Limardo (VEN)	Weston Kelsey (USA); Hugues Boisvert-Simard (CAN)
Sabre	Daryl Homer (USA)	Vincent Couturier (CAN)	Renzo Agresta (BRA); Philippe Beaudry (CAN)
Team Foil	United States	Canada	Brazil
Team Épée	United States	Canada	Venezuela
Team Sabre	United States	Canada	Venezuela

=== Women's events ===
Event	Gold	Silver	Bronze
Foil	Lee Kiefer (USA)	Doris Willette (USA)	Nzingha Prescod (USA); Monica Peterson (CAN)
Épée	Kelley Hurley (USA)	Courtney Hurley (USA)	Cáterin Bravo Aránguiz (USA); Lindsay Campbell (USA)
Sabre	Mariel Zagunis (USA)	Sandra Sassine (CAN)	Belén Pérez Maurice (ARG); Sandra Sassine (CAN)
Team Foil	United States	Canada	Brazil
Team Épée	United States	Canada	Mexico
Team Sabre	United States	Venezuela	Mexico

=== Medal table ===
Rank	Nation	Gold	Silver	Bronze	Total
1	United States	12	3	5	20
2	Canada	0	7	4	11
3	Venezuela	0	2	2	4
4	Brazil	0	0	3	3
4	Mexico	0	0	3	3
6	Argentina	0	0	1	1
Totals (6 entries)		12	12	18	42
