= Fencing at the 2023 Pan American Games – Men's team sabre =

Men's team sabre at the 2023 Pan American Games
- Venue: Paralympic Training Center
- Dates: November 4
- Competitors: 24 from 8 nations

Medalists
Gold medal	François Cauchon; Shaul Gordon; Fares Arfa	Canada
Silver medal	Josef Cohen; Andrew Doddo; Filip Dolegiewicz	United States
Bronze medal	Abraham Rodríguez; Eliécer Romero; José Quintero	Venezuela

The men's team sabre competition of the fencing events at the 2023 Pan American Games was held on November 4 at the Paralympic Training Center.

== Format ==
The team sabre competition consisted of a three-round single-elimination bracket with a bronze medal match between the two semifinal losers and classification semifinals and finals for 5th to 8th places. Teams consist of three members each. Matches consist of nine bouts, with every fencer on one team facing each fencer on the other team. Scoring carried over between bouts with a total of 45 touches being the team goal. Bouts lasted until one team reached the target multiple of 5 touches. For example, if the first bout ended with a score of 5–3, that score would remain into the next bout and the second bout would last until one team reached 10 touches. Bouts also had a maximum time of three minutes each; if the final bout ended before either team reached 45 touches, the team leading at that point won. A tie at that point would result in an additional one-minute sudden-death time period. This sudden-death period was further modified by the selection of a draw-winner beforehand; if neither fencer scored a touch during the minute, the predetermined draw-winner won the bout.

== Schedule ==
Date	Time	Round
November 4, 2023	12:00	Quarterfinals
November 4, 2023	13:40	Semifinals
November 4, 2023	13:40	Fifth - Eight Place
November 4, 2023	14:20	Seventh - Eight Place
November 4, 2023	14:20	Fifth - Sixth Place
November 4, 2023	16:50	Finals

== Results ==
The results were as follows:

Quarterfinals
United States	45
Argentina	31
Chile	37
Venezuela	45
Colombia	45
Brazil	24
Mexico	40
Canada	45

Semifinals
United States	45
Venezuela	27
Colombia	44
Canada	45

Final
United States	38
Canada	45
Third place
Venezuela	45
Colombia	39

=== Classification 5 – 8 ===
Classification
Chile	37
Argentina	45
Mexico	45
Brazil	37

Fifth place
Argentina	45
Mexico	40
Seventh place
Chile	30
Brazil	45

== Final classification ==
Rank	Team	Athlete
1st place, gold medalist(s)	Canada	François Cauchon; Shaul Gordon; Fares Arfa
2nd place, silver medalist(s)	United States	Josef Cohen; Andrew Doddo; Filip Dolegiewicz
3rd place, bronze medalist(s)	Venezuela	Abraham Rodríguez; Eliécer Romero; José Quintero
4	Colombia	Mario Palacios; Sebastián Cuéllar; Luis Correa Vila
5	Argentina	Stefano Lucchetti; Pascual Di Tella; Arturo Salgado
6	Mexico	Brandon Romo; Julián Ayala; Gibrán Zea
7	Brazil	Enrico Pezzi; Henrique Garrigós; Fábio Salles
8	Chile	Manuel Bahamonde; Ricardo Álvarez García; Roberto Monsalva
