= Mailyn González =

Cuban fencer (born 1980)

Personal information
- Born: December 29, 1980 (age 45) Santiago de Cuba
Medal record
Women's Fencing
Representing Cuba
Pan American Games
| Gold medal – first place | 2007 Rio de Janeiro | Sabre |
| Gold medal – first place | 2007 Rio de Janeiro | Team Sabre |

Mailyn González Pozo (born December 29, 1980, in Santiago de Cuba) is a female fencer from Cuba. She competed for her native country at the 2008 Summer Olympics in the sabre competition, and won two gold medals at the 2007 Pan American Games.
