= Igor Tikhomirov (fencer) =

Canadian-Soviet fencer

Personal information
- Born: 4 May 1963 (age 63) Moscow, Russian SFSR, Soviet Union

Sport
- Sport: Fencing
Medal record
Men's fencing
Representing Soviet Union
Olympic Games
Bronze medal – third place	1988 Seoul	Épée Team
World Championships
Gold medal – first place	1987 Lausanne	Epée Team
Representing Canada
World Championships
Bronze medal – third place	2006 Torino	Epée Individual
Pan American Championships
Gold medal – first place	2006 Valencia	Epée Individual

Igor Sergeyevich Tikhomirov (Russian: Игорь Сергеевич Тихомиров) (born 4 May 1963) is a Canadian (formerly Soviet) épée fencer.

He competed for the Soviets at the 1988 Summer Olympics, winning a bronze medal in the épée team competition. During the Soviet part of his career he trained at Dynamo in Moscow.

Tikhomirov won the bronze medal for Canada at the épée 2006 World Fencing Championships after he lost 15-6 to Wang Lei in the semi-final. Same year he won gold for Canada at Pan American Championships. He also represented Canada at 2008 Beijing Olympic Games where he finished 15.

He lives in Toronto where he runs the Sword Players Fencing Academy.
