= Carlos Rodríguez (fencer) =

Venezuelan fencer (born 1978)

Personal information
- Born: 20 April 1978 (age 48)

Sport
- Sport: Fencing
Medal record
Men's Fencing
Representing Venezuela
Pan American Games
Bronze medal – third place	1999 Winnipeg	Foil
Bronze medal – third place	2003 Santo Domingo	Foil
Bronze medal – third place	2007 Rio de Janeiro	Foil
Central American and Caribbean Games
Gold medal – first place	2006 Cartagena	Foil
Gold medal – first place	2006 Cartagena	Team foil

Carlos Rodríguez (born 20 April 1978) is a Venezuelan fencer. He competed in the foil events at the 1996, 2000 and 2004 Summer Olympics.
