= Julie Leprohon =

Canadian fencer (born 1980)

Personal information
- Born: November 30, 1980 (age 45) Montreal, Quebec

Sport
- Sport: Fencing
Medal record
Women's Fencing
Representing Canada
Pan American Games
| Silver medal – second place | 2007 Rio de Janeiro | Epée |

Julie Leprohon (born November 30, 1980) is a Canadian fencer. She was part of the team Canada épée team who finished fourth at the 2004 Summer Olympics.
