= Shaul Gordon =

Canadian fencer

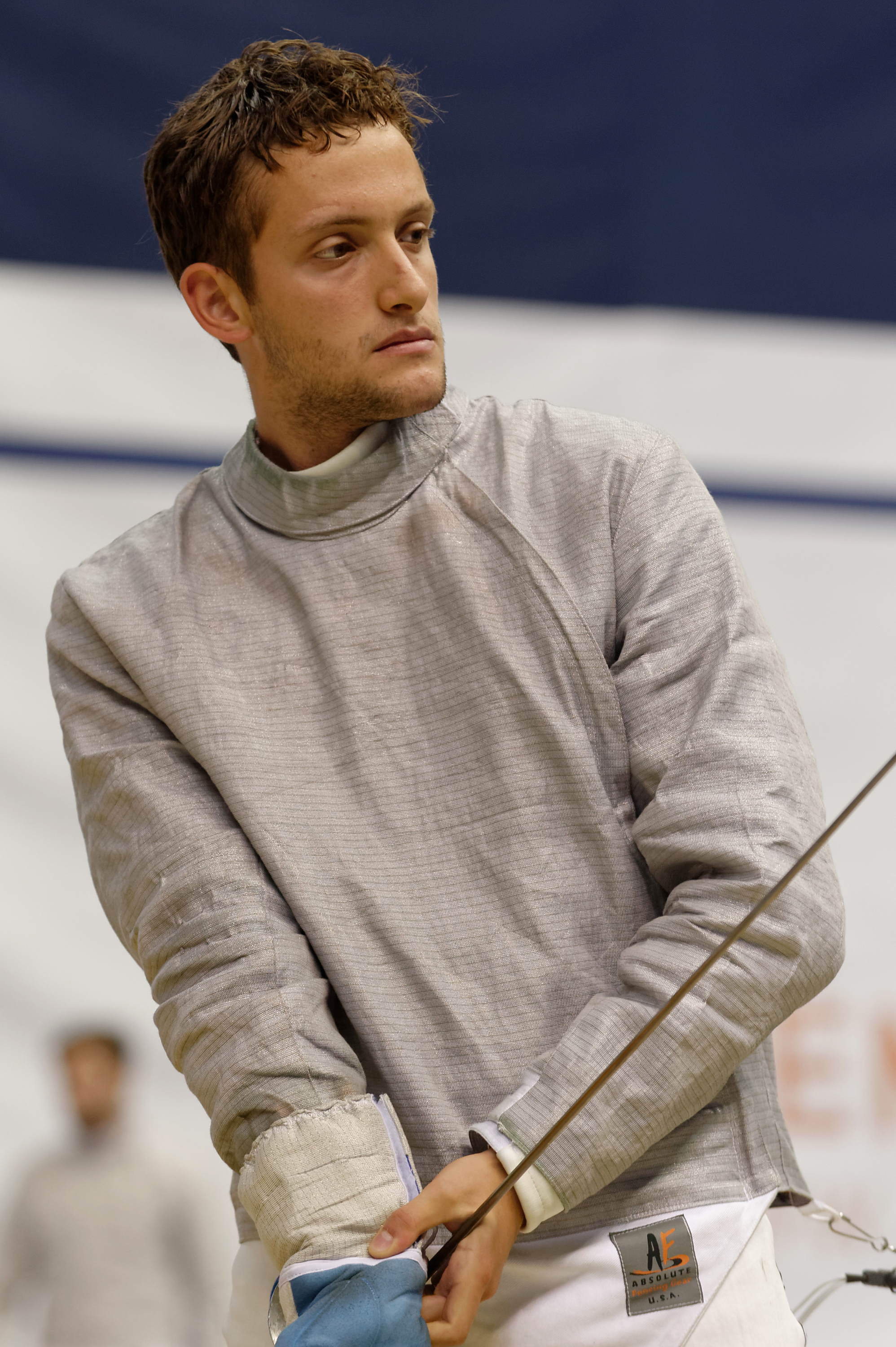
- Shaul Gordon at the 2015 World Fencing Championships at the Olympic Stadium in Moscow.

Personal information
- Native name: שאול גורדון
- Born: July 11, 1994 (age 32) Tel Aviv, Israel
- Height: 187 cm (6 ft 2 in)
- Weight: 82 kg (181 lb)
Medal record
Men's fencing
Representing Canada
Pan American Games
Gold medal – first place	2023 Santiago	Team sabre
Silver medal – second place	2015 Toronto	Team sabre
Silver medal – second place	2019 Lima	Team sabre
Bronze medal – third place	2019 Lima	Individual sabre
Bronze medal – third place	2023 Santiago	Individual sabre
Pan American Fencing Championships
Silver medal – second place	2024 Lima	Team Sabre
Silver medal – second place	2015 Santiago	Team sabre
Silver medal – second place	2017 Montreal	Team sabre
Silver medal – second place	2018 Havana	Team sabre
Silver medal – second place	2019 Toronto	Team sabre

Shaul Gordon (Hebrew: שאול גורדון; born July 11, 1994) is an Israeli-Canadian fencer in the sabre discipline. Gordon has represented the country on the international stage since 2013 and has competed at two Olympic Games, three Pan American Games and eight World Fencing Championships.

== Early and personal life ==
Gordon was born in Tel Aviv, Israel, to Monica and Eliahu Gordon, and is Jewish. He then moved to Italy and finally to Richmond, British Columbia, Canada as a child. His sister Tamar represented Israel and Canada in fencing internationally, and his brother Mati plays for the national rugby union team of Israel. His partner Yana Botvinnik competed for Israel in fencing internationally.

For high school, Gordon attended Richmond High Secondary. For college he attended Penn State, and then the University of Pennsylvania, and he subsequently graduated from the McGill University Faculty of Law ('19). Gordon formerly resided in Richmond, British Columbia, but now lives and trains in Montreal, Quebec.

== Fencing career ==
Gordon started to fence when he was seven years old. His coach is Arthur Zatko.

In 2015, Gordon represented Canada at the 2015 Pan American Games in Toronto, and picked up a silver medal in the team sabre event. At the 2018 Pan American Fencing Championships, he won the individual men's sabre medal. At the 2019 Pan American Games in Lima, Peru, he finished second in the team sabre, and third in the individual sabre event.

Gordon finished in eighth place in the individual sabre event at the 2019 World Fencing Championships, the highest finish ever by a Canadian in the discipline. In the 2023 Pan American Games he was awarded a bronze medal in individual sabre and a gold medal in team sabre, and at the 2024 Pan American Fencing Championships he won a silver medal in team sabre.

=== Olympics ===
Gordon competed for Canada at the 2020 Tokyo Olympics in the men's individual sabre event.

In April 2024, Gordon was named to Canada's 2024 Olympic team. He competed in Men's sabre at the 2024 Paris Olympics, and was knocked out by Luigi Samele of Italy in the round of 32, who went on to win the bronze medal, and while Gordon won two of his three bouts in men's sabre team (including a victory over individual gold medal winner Oh Sang-uk), Canada lost to Number 1 ranked South Korea in the quarter-finals.

== See also ==
- List of Pan American Games medalists in fencing
- List of Pennsylvania State University Olympians
