= Renzo Agresta =

Brazilian fencer (born 1985)

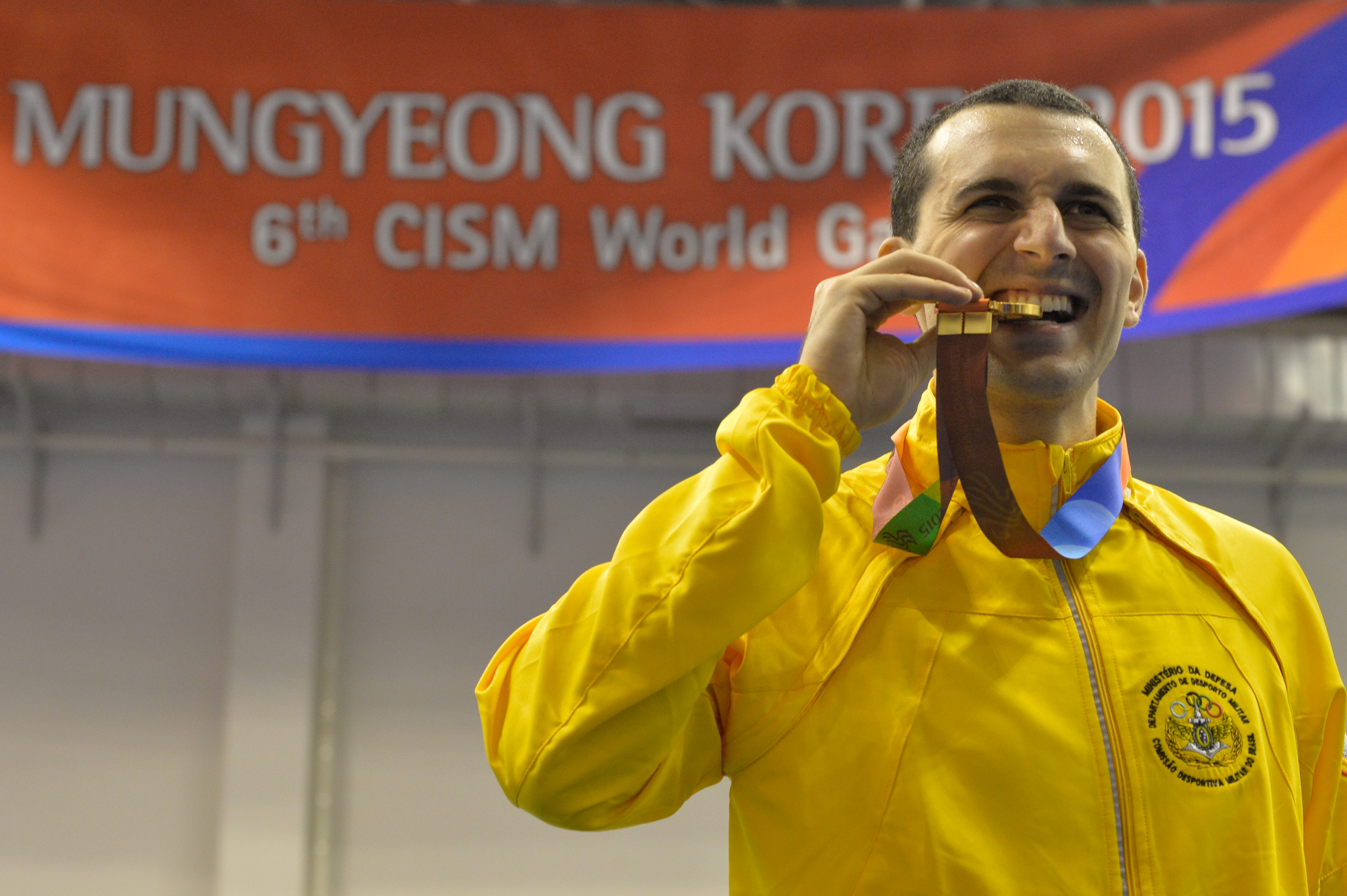
- Agresta in 2015

Personal information
- Full name: Renzo Pasquale Zeglio Agresta
- Born: 27 June 1985 (age 41) São Paulo, São Paulo, Brazil
- Height: 1.80 m (5 ft 11 in)
- Weight: 75 kg (165 lb)

Fencing career
- Sport: Fencing
- Weapon: Sabre
- Hand: Right-handed
- FIE ranking: current ranking
Medal record
Men's Fencing
Representing Brazil
Pan American Games
Bronze medal – third place	2007 Rio de Janeiro	Individual sabre
Bronze medal – third place	2011 Guadalajara	Team foil
Bronze medal – third place	2011 Guadalajara	Team sabre
Bronze medal – third place	2015 Toronto	Individual sabre
Pan American Championships
Gold medal – first place	2013 Cartagena	Individual sabre
Bronze medal – third place	2011 Reno	Individual sabre
Bronze medal – third place	2014 San José	Individual sabre
Bronze medal – third place	2015 Santiago	Individual sabre
Military World Games
Gold medal – first place	2015 Mungyeong	Individual sabre

Renzo Pasquale Zeglio Agresta (born 27 June 1985) is a Brazilian fencer. He competed in the individual sabre events at the 2004, 2008 and 2012 Summer Olympics.

He began fencing when he was 12, at the Paulistano club. As part of his preparation for the 2012 Olympics, he moved to Rome in order to improve his fencing.

In 2014, Agresta reached 15th place in the world rankings.
