= Tim Morehouse =

American fencer

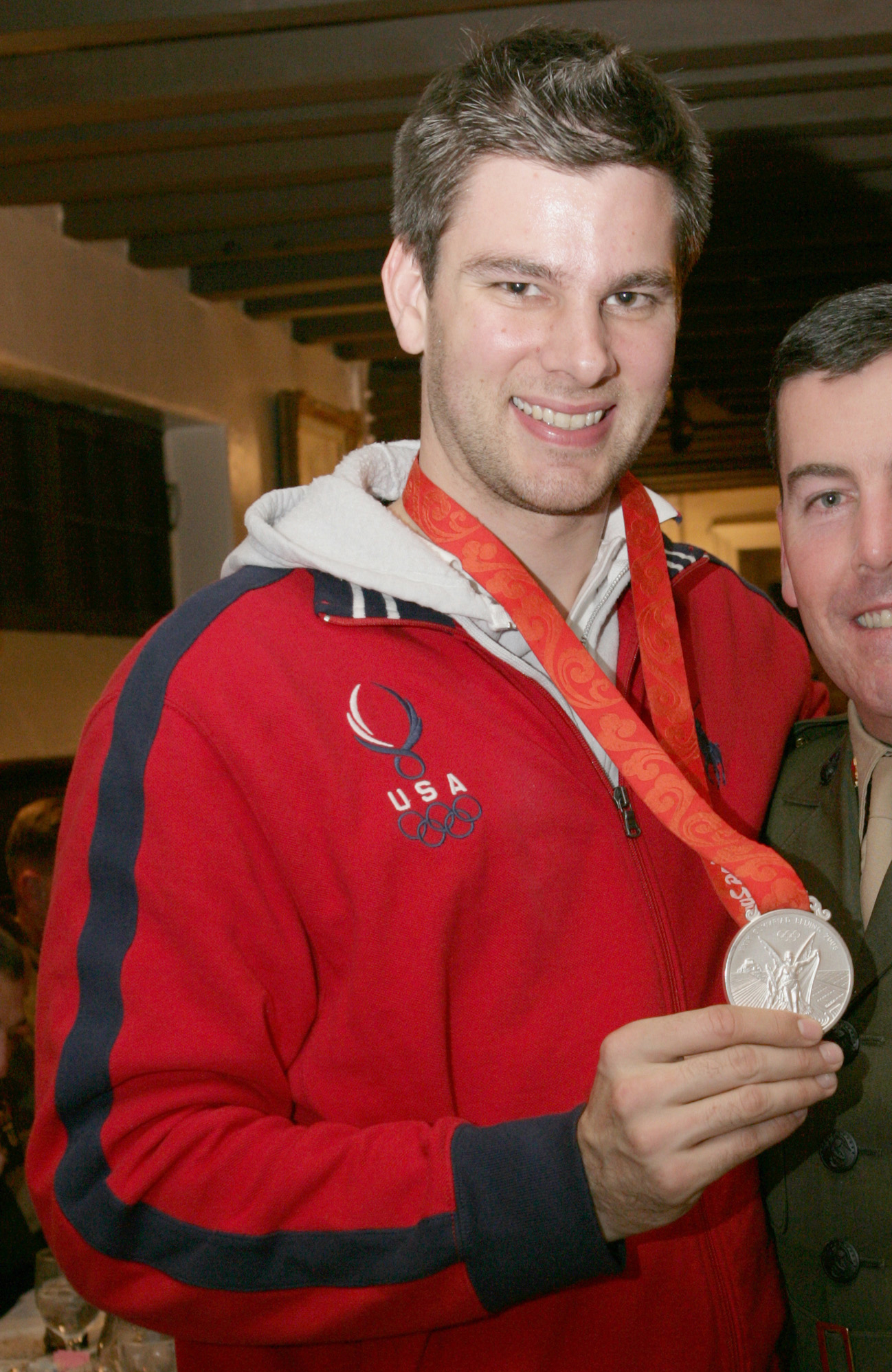
- Morehouse in 2008

Personal information
- Full name: Timothy Morehouse
- Born: 29 July 1978 (age 48) New York City, New York
- Height: 1.88 m (6 ft 2 in)
- Weight: 91 kg (201 lb)
- Website: timmorehousefencing.com

Fencing career
- Sport: Fencing
- Country: United States of America
- Weapon: sabre
- Hand: right-handed
- National coach: Yury Gelman
- Club: Tim Morehouse Fencing Club
- FIE ranking: archive
Medal record
Men's Sabre
Representing United States
Olympic Games
Silver medal – second place	2008 Beijing	Sabre Team

Timothy Frank Morehouse (born July 29, 1978) is an American fencer who won a Silver Medal competing in the men's sabre as a member of the United States fencing team at the 2008 Summer Olympics in Beijing. Morehouse is coached by Yury Gelman. He is the founder of the Fencing in the Schools program.

== Early life ==
Morehouse is the son of Eloise and John Morehouse. He grew up in New York City in the neighborhoods of Washington Heights and Riverdale. He originally took up fencing at Riverdale Country School in order to be excused from gym class. In high school, he played on the Riverdale Country School's baseball team all four years and was a member of the cross country running team for one year. He was the fencing team's captain and most valuable player during his junior and senior years at the school.

=== Higher education ===
Morehouse received a bachelor's degree from Brandeis University in 2000, majoring in history. He earned a master's degree in teaching from Pace University in 2003.

=== Religious and ethnic heritage ===
His maternal grandmother was a Jewish immigrant who escaped Nazi Germany in the 1930s; she later joined the Quakers. Morehouse was raised with a "mixture" of religious traditions. He spoke in an interview before the 2012 Olympics about how his "sense of being Jewish" is based on the experiences of his maternal grandmother, and that he planned to participate in the 2013 Maccabiah Games, an international Jewish athletic event held in Israel every four years.

== Fencing career ==
Morehouse won a Silver Medal competing in the men's sabre as a member of the United States fencing team, at the 2008 Summer Olympics in Beijing. He is a two-time individual U.S. National Champion (2010 and 2011) and was the number-one-ranked U.S. men's sabre fencer from 2008 to 2011. He trained with Yury Gelman at the Manhattan Fencing Center, and at Bodhizone Human Performance and Sports Physical Therapy in New York City.

=== College ===
Morehouse attended Brandeis University, where he was ranked in the top 10 of the NCAA's Division I men's sabre in each of his final three years at the school (ranked tenth in 1998, sixth in 1999, and fourth in 2000). He was honored as an NCAA All-American in each of those years. He was voted by coaches and athletes as NCAA men's sabre fencer of the year in 2000. Morehouse led Brandeis to be ranked tenth among all Division I schools in 2000. (Note: Brandeis University is an NCAA Division III school that competed against schools in Division I in fencing.)

=== Olympics ===
Morehouse was a member of the U.S. Olympic team in 2004, 2008, and 2012.

Morehouse was selected as a reserve on the U.S. Fencing Team at the 2004 Summer Olympics in Athens, after mounting a comeback and defeating Ahmed Yilla at the U.S. Fencing National Championship in Atlanta, where he competed as part of Fencers Club. As a replacement, Morehouse was ineligible for individual competition but could participate as a substitute in team competition. Morehouse was ranked 16th in the world in 2007.

Morehouse competed in men's team sabre at the 2008 Summer Olympics in Beijing, and he won a silver medal in saber, the highest finish anyone on the U.S. fencing team had ever won in saber.

In the 2012 London Olympic Games, he competed in both the team and individual events. In individual men's saber, he lost in the quarterfinals to Diego Occhiuzzi of Italy, who went on to win silver. In the men's team sabre event Morehouse was one of two fencers from the Beijing Olympics still on the team, the other being James Williams. The team eventually came in 8th.

== Service and philanthropy ==
After graduating from college, Morehouse taught underprivileged students while working with Teach For America, teaching 7th grade at Intermediate School 90 in Washington Heights, Manhattan while he coached the fencing team at his alma mater, Riverdale Country School. He has worked at the organization's offices in New York City while he trained for the Olympics.

After the 2004 Olympic Games, he started teaching students in the East Bronx, again through Teach for America. In 2010, Fast Company named him one of the most influential alumni of Teach For America.

He also supports various nonprofit organizations and is an Athlete Ambassador for Right to Play, an organization working with volunteers and partners to use sport and play to enhance child development in areas of disadvantage. In 2011, Morehouse founded Fencing in the Schools, a nonprofit program dedicated to bringing the sport of fencing to underserved communities throughout the United States. As of 2018, about 35 New York City high schoolers fence through Fencing in the Schools.

== Fencing outreach and development ==
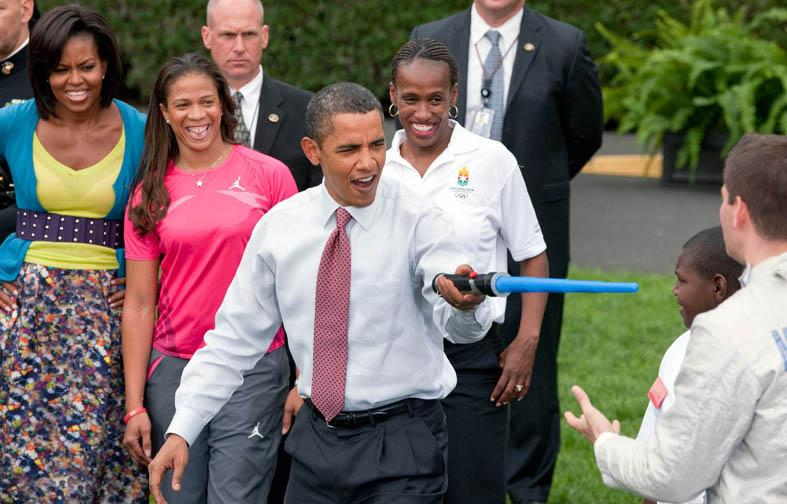
President Barack Obama participates in a fencing demonstration with Tim Morehouse on the White House lawn.

After the 2008 Olympics, Morehouse worked to promote the sport of fencing and established programs to attract new participants to the sport. As a motivational speaker, Morehouse spoke to over 15,000 children and young people in urban schools about his Olympic story. He has also given presentations to Fortune 100 and 500 organizations. In 2009, he showed President Obama how to fence on the White House lawn in support of Chicago bid for the 2016 Summer Olympics. He has appeared on The Today Show and The Happy Hour on Fox Business. In 2008, he was one of the featured athletes on the Emmy Award-winning television documentary, "My First Time: The Summer Games", directed and produced by Jesse Zook Mann.

In 2015, Morehouse founded the Tim Morehouse Fencing Club in New York City and later in Port Chester, New York. The club has saber, foil, and épée programs. The club specializes in beginner fencers, both youth and adult. It also offers advanced classes for competitive saber fencers. The classes are arranged by age and skill level. Morehouse hopes his club will create interest in the sport of fencing.

Tim Morehouse is the owner and head coach of the club. Melvin Rodriguez is also a coach at the club and Yitzy Frankel is the Club Manager. He believes the sport will bring benefits to more people around the United States, especially the youth. He has had a few celebrities stop by, such as Project Runway's Tim Gunn, as well as NFL Star Steve Weatherford filming at the location for an episode of Spike TV's Playbook 360.

Currently, Morehouse is attempting to improve the sport of fencing. One project he is working on new technology. On his Facebook page, he posted a video of him and another fencer demonstrating light up sabres. The lights are on the guard as well as on the wrist of the fencer. The problem Morehouse is trying to fix is for people watching the bout. They watch the fencers, then the scoring box, and then look at the director to see who made the touch. With this technology, it will be easier to see who got the touch. It will also be easier on the director, since the director can now focus on the fencers, rather than having to look back at the box to see the lights.

He has made a prototype for foil as well, in hopes of having the sport to be wire-free, without wire jackets, as well as having as much of the technology of the weapons. For the foils, each weapon would have the lights, the lockout timing, and the ability to send data on the movements of the weapon. This data will include who is starting first and the accuracy of attacks. In the video, he shows that the weapons sync up wirelessly, and the jackets they are wearing have a magnetic layer underneath. When hit, there is a sound and the foil lights up green.

Morehouse has also suggested new rules to sabre, making it more like tennis. One fencer would have priority and, after a "set" of four points, the priority is shifted to another fencer. The bouts would then go to 16, instead of 15, with a 2-point margin.

== Writing and awards ==
He is the author of an autobiography, American Fencer: Modern Lessons from an Ancient Sport (2012), in which he recounts experiences as an Olympic athlete and teacher.

Morehouse was inducted into Brandeis Athletics Hall of Fame in 2009, and was the youngest recipient of Brandeis University's Alumni Achievement Award in 2010 for his achievements as an athlete and his work with Teach For America.

In November 2014, Morehouse received the Athletes in Excellence Award from The Foundation for Global Sports Development, in recognition of his community service efforts and work with youth.

== See also ==
- List of select Jewish fencers
- World Fit
- List of USFA Division I National Champions
