= Hernán Jansen =

Venezuelan fencer (born 1985)

Personal information
- Full name: Hernán Enrique Jansen Brito
- Born: 6 March 1985 (age 41) Caracas, Venezuela
- Height: 179 cm (5 ft 10 in) (2012)
- Weight: 81 kg (179 lb) (2012)
Medal record
Men's fencing
Representing Venezuela
Pan American Games
| Bronze medal – third place | 2011 Guadalajara | Sabre |
Central American and Caribbean Games
| Silver medal – second place | 2006 Cartagena | Team sabre |

Hernán Enrique Jansen Brito (Note: In this Spanish name, the first or paternal surname is Jansen and the second or maternal family name is Brito.) (born 6 March 1985 in Caracas) is a Venezuelan fencer. At the 2012 Summer Olympics, he competed in the Men's sabre, but was defeated in the second round.
