= Mariana González (fencer) =

Venezuelan fencer (born 1979)

Personal information
- Born: 17 September 1979 (age 46) Maracaibo, Venezuela
Medal record
Women's Fencing
Representing Venezuela
Pan American Games
Gold medal – first place	2003 Santo Domingo	Foil
Gold medal – first place	2007 Rio de Janeiro	Foil
Gold medal – first place	2007 Rio de Janeiro	Team Foil
Bronze medal – third place	2011 Guadalajara	Team Foil

Mariana Isabel González Parra (born September 17, 1979, in Maracaibo, Zulia) is a female fencer from Venezuela. She twice competed for her native country at the Summer Olympics (2004 and 2008) in the foil competition, and won two gold medals, in the individual and team events at the 2007 Pan American Games.
