= Carlos Bravo (fencer) =

Venezuelan fencer (born 1973)

Personal information
- Born: 25 July 1973 (age 52) Caracas, Venezuela

Sport
- Sport: Fencing
Medal record
Men's Fencing
Representing Venezuela
Central American and Caribbean Games
Gold medal – first place	2006 Cartagena	Sabre
Silver medal – second place	2006 Cartagena	Team sabre
Gold medal – first place	2010 Mayagüez	Team sabre
Silver medal – second place	2010 Mayagüez	Sabre

Carlos Bravo (born 25 July 1973) is a Venezuelan former fencer. He competed in the individual sabre events at the 1996 and 2008 Summer Olympics.
