= James Leighman Williams =

American fencer (born 1985)

James Williams
Personal information
- Full name: James Leighman Williams
- Born: September 22, 1985 (age 40) Sacramento, California, U.S.
Medal record
Men's fencing
Representing the United States
Olympic Games
Silver medal – second place	2008 Beijing	Sabre Team
Pan American Games
Gold medal – first place	2007 Rio de Janeiro	Sabre Team
Gold medal – first place	2011 Guadalajara	Sabre Team
Silver medal – second place	2007 Rio de Janeiro	Sabre

James Leighman Williams (born September 22, 1985) is an American fencer.

== College career ==
Williams is a graduate of Columbia University. He fenced for the Columbia Lions fencing team. In his college freshman year, he posted a record of 18–3. Coming into Columbia he was ranked 8th nationally in Junior men's sabre, and 19th in Senior men's sabre. Williams originally began fencing with the Sacramento Fencing Club. After graduating from high school, James moved to New York to attend Columbia University. He graduated in 2007 with a B.A. in United States History and Russian Studies.

In 2006 in his junior year he received All-American status, after placing 5th at the NCAA championships. He placed 1st in sabre at the North American Cup. He also finished 4th at the NCAA Regionals, and was named 1st team All Ivy League after winning 14 of 15 Ivy League bouts.

== Competitions ==
He twice finished 7th in the Junior "A" World Cup. Finished 5th at the World Cup in Louisville, and was 3rd in Under-19 Junior men's saber in 2001. In 2003 he finished 2nd in the same event, as well as 17th in Division I. He was National Champion in 2012.

In the 2008 Beijing Olympics, he was a substitute, but competed in the gold medal bout against France. He faced Nicolas Lopez (3-5), Julien Pillet (5-5), and Boris Sanson (2-5) in the bout. The U.S overall lost 45 – 37.

He competed on the US team at the 2012 London Olympics where he hoped to "visit a couple pubs...win another medal...[and] develop a passable British accent." As well as competing in the team event, which he said was his main goal, he competed in the men's individual sabre event. In the individual event, he reached the second round where he lost to eventual bronze medal winner, Nikolay Kovalev. The US men's sabre team were knocked out by the Russian team, also featuring Kovalev, in the quarter-final.

== See also ==
- List of USFA Division I National Champions
