= Pan American Fencing Championships =

Annual fencing championship

The Pan American Fencing Championships are an annual top-level fencing tournament organized by the Pan American Fencing Confederation. They serve as zone championships for the Fencing World Cup run by the International Fencing Federation.

== Editions ==
Number	Year	City	Country	Events
1	2006	Valencia	Venezuela	8
2	2007	Montréal	Canada	12
3	2008	Querétaro	Mexico	12
4	2009	San Salvador	El Salvador	12
5	2010	San José	Costa Rica	12
6	2011	Reno	United States	12
7	2012	Cancún	Mexico	12
8	2013	Cartagena	Colombia	12
9	2014	San José	Costa Rica	12
10	2015	Santiago	Chile	12
11	2016	Panama City	Panama	12
12	2017	Montréal	Canada	12
13	2018	Havana	Cuba	12
14	2019	Toronto	Canada	12
15	2022	Asunción	Paraguay	12
16	2023	Lima	Peru	12
17	2024	Lima	Peru	12
18	2025	Rio de Janeiro	Brazil	12
19	2026	Lima	Peru	12

== Medals (2006-2026) ==
Rank	Nation	Gold	Silver	Bronze	Total
1	United States	168	75	105	348
2	Venezuela	20	29	48	97
3	Canada	18	77	73	168
4	Cuba	8	4	12	24
5	Argentina	4	6	24	34
6	Brazil	3	14	35	52
7	Mexico	3	9	20	32
8	Colombia	0	5	8	13
9	Panama	0	2	1	3
10	Paraguay	0	1	2	3
11	Puerto Rico	0	1	1	2
12	U.S. Virgin Islands	0	1	0	1
13	Chile	0	0	8	8
14	Peru	0	0	1	1
Totals (14 entries)		224	224	338	786

== Pan American Cadets and Juniors Fencing Championships ==
Number	Year	City	Country	Events
1	2016		Mexico	
2	2017	Havana	Cuba	18
3	2018	San Jose	Costa Rica	18
4	2019	Bogotá	Colombia	18
5	2020	San Salvador	El Salvador	18
6	2022	Lima	Peru	18
7	2023	Bogotá	Colombia	18
8	2024	Rio de Janeiro	Brazil	18
9	2025	Asunción	Paraguay	18
10	2026	Bogotá	Colombia	18

== See also ==
- Fencing at the Summer Olympics
- World Fencing Championships
- other zone championships: African Fencing Championships, Asian Fencing Championships, European Fencing Championships
