= List of Pan American Games medalists in fencing =

This is the complete list of Pan American Games medalists in fencing from 1951 to 2019.

== Men's events ==
=== Individual épée ===
Games	Gold	Silver	Bronze
1951	Antonio Villamil; Argentina	Benito Ramos; Mexico	Edward Vebell; United States
1955	Raúl Martínez; Argentina	Sewall Shurtz; United States	Juan Camous; Venezuela
1959	Roland Wommack; United States	Michael D'Asaro Sr. United States	Alberto Balestrini; Argentina
1963	Frank Anger; United States	Sergio Vergara; Chile	Alberto Balestrini; Argentina
1967	Arthur Telles Cramer Ribeiro; Brazil	Frank Anger; United States	Paul Pesthy; United States
1971	Stephen Netburn; United States	Silvio Fernández; Venezuela	James Melcher; United States
1975	Omar Vergara; Argentina	Scott Bozek; United States	Paul Pesthy; United States
1979	Mario De Brelaz; Argentina	Paul Pesthy; United States	Alberto Quiroga; Cuba
1983	Agapito Nussa; Cuba	Jean-Marc Chouinard; Canada	Timothy Glass; United States
1987	Carlos Pedroso; Cuba	Wilfredo Loyola; Cuba	Jean-Marc Chouinard; Canada
1991	Lázaro Castro; Cuba	Jon Normile; United States	Danek Nowosielski; Canada
1995	Carlos Pedroso; Cuba	Tamir Bloom; United States	Paris Inostroza; Chile
1995	Carlos Pedroso; Cuba	Tamir Bloom; United States	Iván Trevejo; Cuba
1999	Carlos Pedroso; Cuba	Tamir Bloom; United States	Paris Inostroza; Chile
1999	Carlos Pedroso; Cuba	Tamir Bloom; United States	Iván Trevejo Pérez; Cuba
2003	Camilo Boris; Cuba	Silvio Fernández; Venezuela	Víctor Bernier; Puerto Rico; Paris Inostroza; Chile
2007	Rubén Limardo; Venezuela	Andrés Carillo; Cuba	Paris Inostroza; Chile; Silvio Fernández; Venezuela
2011	Weston Kelsey; United States	Rubén Limardo; Venezuela	Silvio Fernández; Venezuela
2011	Weston Kelsey; United States	Rubén Limardo; Venezuela	Reynier Henriquez; Cuba
2015	Rubén Limardo; Venezuela	José Domínguez; Argentina	Hugues Boisvert-Simard; Canada
2015	Rubén Limardo; Venezuela	José Domínguez; Argentina	Jason Pryor; United States
2019	Rubén Limardo; Venezuela	Jesús Limardo; Venezuela	Jhon Édison Rodríguez; Colombia
2019	Rubén Limardo; Venezuela	Jesús Limardo; Venezuela	Yunior Reytor; Cuba
2023	Dylan French; Canada	Pablo Núñez; Chile	Francisco Limardo; Venezuela
2023	Dylan French; Canada	Pablo Núñez; Chile	Alexandre Camargo; Brazil

=== Team épée ===
Games	Gold	Silver	Bronze
1951	Argentina; Antonio Villamil; Guido Lavalle; Raúl Saucedo; Floro Díaz; Vito Simonetti; A. Repetto	United States; Edward Vebell; Albert Wolff; Fred Weber; Byron Krieger; Nathaniel Lubell; Miguel de Capriles	Cuba; Carlos Lamar; Roberto Mañalich; Jorge Agostini; Roberto García; Miguel Olivella
1955	Argentina; Floro Díaz; Alfredo Daverde; Raúl Martínez; Félix Galimi	United States; Rex Dyer; Sewall Shurtz; Abram Cohen; Harold Goldsmith	Venezuela; Juan Camous; Nelson Nieves; Gustavo Gutiérrez; Oscar Cabrera
1959	United States; Richard Berry; Michael D'Asaro Sr. Howard Fried; Henry Kolowrat Jr. Paul Levy; Roland Wommack	Cuba; Eduardo Alvarez; Roberto Jordan; Roberto Mañalich; Miguel Olivella; José Pereda; Roberto García	Argentina; Arturo Acuna; Alberto Balestrini; Floro Díaz; Mauricio Munoz; Francisco Serp; Carlos Velazauez
1963	United States; James Margolis; Gilbert Eisner; Larry Anastasi; Frank Anger; James Melcher	Brazil; Aloysio Alves Borges; José Maria de Andrade Pereira; Arthur Telles Cramer Ribeiro; Carlos Luiz Rodrigues do Couto	Argentina; Fluro Fulgencio; Omar Vergara; Raul Martínez; Alberto Balestrini; Guillermo Saucedo
1967	United States; Frank Anger; Paul Pesthy; Ralph Spinella; Carl Borack	Brazil; Arthur Telles Cramer Ribeiro; Carlos Luiz Rodriguez do Couto; Jose Maria de Andrade Pereira; Darío Marcondes do Amaral	Venezuela; Silvio Fernández; Félix Piñero; Roberto Drayer
1971	United States; Robert Beck; George Masin; James Melcher; Stephen Netburn	Brazil; Jose Maria de Andrade Pereira; Arthur Telles Cramer Ribeiro; Marcus Alves Borges	Cuba; Gustavo Oliveros; Jose Araencibia; Ramon Infante
1975	United States; William Reith; Paul Pesthy; Brooke Makler; Scott Bozek	Cuba; Ricardo Cabrera; Jose Arencibia; Narciso Simet; Victor Suárez	Brazil; Arthur Telles Cramer Ribeiro; Ronaldo Vadson Schwantes; Federico Barreira de Alencar; Francisco Itálico Buonafina
1979	United States; Peter Schifrin; Paul Pesthy; Scott Bozek; Lee Shelley	Cuba; Alberto Quiroga; Narciso Simet; Genaro Perez; Victor Suárez	Argentina; Osvaldo Gaspar; Mario De Brelaz; Guillermo Spangenberg; Juan Piran
1983	Canada; Jean-Marc Chouinard; Daniel Perreault; Alain Côté; Jacques Cardyn; Michel Dessureault	United States; Paul Pesthy; Peter Schifrin; Robert Nieman; Tim Glass; Stephen Trevor	Venezuela; Florencio Marrero; Francisco Castillo; Carlos Agreda; Ricardo Vitanza; Wilmer Parra
1987	Cuba; Carlos Pedroso; Wilfredo Loyola; Lazaro Castro; Pedro Merencio	United States; Stephen Trevor; Lee Shelley; Robert Marx; Rob Stull	Colombia; Mauricio Rivas; Francisco Pinto; Joaquin Pinto; Juan Miguel Paz
1991	Cuba; Lazaro Castro; Cesar Aguilera; Miguel de la Rosa; Iván Trevejo; Camilo Boris	Colombia; Mauricio Rivas; Juan Miguel Paz; Oscar Arango; Nelson Ruiz; William González	United States; Robert Marx; Jon Normile; Joseph Socolof; Chris O'Loughlin; James Carpenter
1995	Cuba; Carlos Pedroso; Iván Trevejo; Lazaro Castro Terry; Cesar Aguilera Bance	United States; Tamir Bloom; Michael Marx; James O'Neill; James Carpenter	Colombia; Mauricio Rivas; Juan Miguel Paz; Carlos Enrique Carrasquilla; William González
1999	Cuba; Camilo Boris; Nelson Loyola; Iván Trevejo; Carlos Pedroso	Chile; L. Inostroza; G. Romero; S. Penzo Junge; Paris Inostroza	Colombia; Saujl A. Vasco; William González; Mauricio Rivas; Juan Miguel Paz
2003	Cuba; Camilo Boris; Andrés Carillo; Nelson Loyola	Venezuela; Rubén Limardo; Silvio Fernández	Puerto Rico; Víctor Bernier; David Bernier; Jonathan Peña; Marcos Peña
2007	Cuba; Andrés Carillo; Camilo Boris; David Castillo; Guillermo Madrigal	Venezuela; Rubén Limardo; Silvio Fernández; Wolfgang Mejías	United States; Andras Horanyi; Benjamin Ungar; Cody Mattern; Weston Kelsey
2011	United States; Soren Thompson; Weston Kelsey; Cody Mattern; Gerek Meinhardt	Venezuela; Silvio Fernández; Francisco Limardo; Rubén Limardo; Jhon Perez	Canada; Tigran Bajgoric; Igor Gantsevich; Vincent Pelletier; Étienne Lalonde Turbide
2015	Venezuela; Rubén Limardo; Francisco Limardo; Silvio Fernández	United States; Yeisser Ramirez; Jason Pryor; Benjamin Bratton	Cuba; Yunior Reytor; Reynier Henrique; Ringo Quintero
2019	Cuba; Reynier Henrique; Humberto Aguilera; Yunior Reytor; Luis Enrique Patterson	Argentina; Santiago Lucchetti; Alessandro Taccani; José Félix Domínguez; Jesús Lugones	Venezuela; Jesús Limardo; Grabiel Lugo; Francisco Limardo; Rubén Limardo
2023	United States; Curtis McDowald; Samuel Imrek; Samuel Larsen	Canada; Fynn Fafard; Dylan French; Nicholas Zhang	Argentina; Jesús Lugones; Alessandro Taccani; Agustín Gusmán

=== Individual foil ===
Games	Gold	Silver	Bronze
1951	Félix Galimi; Argentina	José Rodríguez; Argentina	Nathaniel Lubell; United States
1955	Harold Goldsmith; United States	Albert Axelrod; United States	Fulvio Galimi; Argentina
1959	Harold Goldsmith; United States	Albert Axelrod; United States	Joseph Paletta Jr. United States
1963	Guillermo Saucedo; Argentina	Albert Axelrod; United States	Herbert Cohen; United States
1967	Guillermo Saucedo; Argentina	Albert Axelrod; United States	Orlando Nannini; Argentina
1971	Eduardo Jhons; Cuba	Jesús Gil; Cuba	Uriah Jones; United States
1975	Martin Lang; United States	Eduardo Jhons; Cuba	Enrique Salvat; Cuba
1979	Heriberto González; Cuba	Fernando Lupiz; Argentina	John Nonna; United States
1983	Efigenio Favier; Cuba	José Rafael Magallanes; Venezuela	Greg Massialas; United States
1987	Guillermo Betancourt; Cuba	Tulio Díaz; Cuba	Michael Marx; United States
1991	Guillermo Betancourt; Cuba	Elvis Gregory; Cuba	Nick Bravin; United States
1995	Elvis Gregory; Cuba	Rolando Tucker; Cuba	Eric Bravin; United States
1999	Rolando Tucker; Cuba	Elvis Gregory; Cuba	Zaddick Longenbach; United States
1999	Rolando Tucker; Cuba	Elvis Gregory; Cuba	Carlos Rodríguez; Venezuela
2003	Dan Kellner; United States	Jonathan Tiomkin; United States	Raúl Perojo; Cuba; Reinier Suárez; Cuba
2007	Andras Horanyi; United States	Felipe Alvear; Chile	Carlos Rodríguez; Venezuela; João Souza; Brazil
2011	Alexander Massialas; United States	Felipe Alvear; Chile	Antonio Leal; Venezuela
2011	Alexander Massialas; United States	Felipe Alvear; Chile	Guilherme Toldo; Brazil
2015	Alexander Massialas; United States	Gerek Meinhardt; United States	Ghislain Perrier; Brazil
2015	Alexander Massialas; United States	Gerek Meinhardt; United States	Daniel Gómez; Mexico
2019	Gerek Meinhardt; United States	Gustavo Alarcón; Chile	Maximilien van Haaster; Canada
2019	Gerek Meinhardt; United States	Gustavo Alarcón; Chile	Race Imboden; United States
2023	Nick Itkin; United States	Miles Chamley-Watson; United States	Augusto Servello; Argentina
2023	Nick Itkin; United States	Miles Chamley-Watson; United States	Guilherme Toldo; Brazil

=== Team foil ===
Games	Gold	Silver	Bronze
1951	United States; Nathaniel Lubell; Edward Vebell; Byron Krieger; Albert Wolff; Miguel de Capriles; Tibor Nyilas	Argentina; Félix Galimi; José Rodríguez; Raúl Saucedo; Santiago Massini; Eduardo Sastre; Fulvio Galimi	Cuba; Jorge Agostini; Armando Barrientos; Abelardo Menéndez; Miguel Olivella
1955	Argentina; Santiago Massini; José Rodríguez; Fulvio Galimi; Félix Galimi	United States; Albert Axelrod; Paul Makler Sr. Harold Goldsmith; Allan Kwartler	Venezuela; Gustavo Gutiérrez; Miraclotes Vargas; Nelson Nieves; Augusto Gutiérrez
1959	United States; Albert Axelrod; Eugene Glazer; Harold Goldsmith; Joseph Paletta Jr. Ed Richards; Lawrence Silverman	Venezuela; Oscar Babrera; Antonio Gómez; Freddy Quintero; Jesús Gruber	Canada; John Andru; Jack Dalton; Robert Foxcroft; Carl Schwende; Abbey Silverstone; Joseph Vida
1963	United States; Ed Richards; Herbert Cohen; Albert Axelrod; Martin Davis	Argentina; Juan Bascolo; Orlando Nannini; Alfredo Hernández; Guillermo Saucedo	Venezuela; Nelson Nieves; Augusto Gutiérrez; Luis Rigoberto; Jesús Gruber
1967	Argentina; Orlando Nannini; Guillermo Saucedo; Fernando Petrella; Evaristo Prendes	United States; Ed Richards; Robert Russell; Jeffrey Checkes; Albert Axelrod	Cuba; Enrique Penabella; Orlando Ruíz; Dagoberto Borges; Luis Morales
1971	United States; Carl Borack; Daniel Cantillon; Uriah Jones; Tyrone Simmons	Cuba; Jesús Gil; Enrique Salvat; Eduardo Jhons	Mexico; Carlos Calderón; Valeriano Pérez; Ernesto Fernández
1975	Cuba; Eduardo Jhons; Enrique Salvat; Leonardo Makenzie; Jorge Garbey	United States; Edward Ballinger; Albert Davis; Walter Krause; Martin Lang	Mexico; Carlos Calderón; Vincente Calderon; Rodolfo Campero; Victor Robles
1979	Cuba; Efigenio Favier; Pedro Hernández; Eduardo Jhons; Heriberto González	United States; Michael Marx; Greg Massialas; Edward Donofrio; John Nonna	Argentina; Fernando Lupiz; Marcelo Cardarelli; Hernan Casanoza; Marcelo Roncali
1983	Cuba; Efigenio Favier; Tulio Díaz	United States; Mark Smith; Greg Massialas; Jack Tichacek; Michael Marx	Venezuela; José Rafael Magallanes; Mouises Requena; Gustavo Olivarez; Oswaldo Ortega
1987	Cuba; Guillermo Betancourt; Tulio Díaz; Oscar García; Efigenio Favier	Canada; Stephen Angers; Benoît Giasson; Luc Rocheleau; Danek Nowosielski	United States; Michael Marx; Peter Lewison; Greg Massialas; Dave Littell
1991	Cuba; Elvis Gregory; Guillermo Betancourt; Oscar García	United States; Nick Bravin; Deidic Hinton; Jerome Demarque	Canada; Nicholas Bergeron; Benoît Giasson; Danek Nowosielski
1995	Cuba; Rolando Tucker; Elvis Gregory; Ignacio Gonzalez Rimont; Oscar García	United States; Nick Bravin; Zaddick Longenbach; Alan Weber; Sean McClain	Argentina; Leandro Marchetti; Alberto González; Christian C. Arslanian; Juan Pablo Barbosa
1999	Cuba; Rolando Tucker; Elvis Gregory; Oscar García; Raul Perojo	United States; Cliff Bayer; Dan Kellner; David Lidow; Zaddick Longenbach	Venezuela; E. Da Silva; Carlos Pineda; Carlos Rodríguez; Rafael Suárez
2003	United States; Jedediah Dupree; Dan Kellner; Soren Thompson; Jonathan Tiomkin	Cuba; Nelson Loyola; Raúl Perojo; Reinier Suárez; Abraham O'Reilly	Venezuela; Enrique da Silva; Joner Pérez; Carlos Pineda; Carlos Rodríguez
2011	United States; Miles Chamley-Watson; Alexander Massialas; Gerek Meinhardt	Canada; Étienne Lalonde Turbide; Anthony Prymack; Nicolas Teisseire; Tigran Bajgoric	Brazil; Fernando Scavasin; Heitor Shimbo; Guilherme Toldo; Renzo Agresta
2015	United States; Miles Chamley-Watson; Alexander Massialas; Gerek Meinhardt	Brazil; Ghislain Perrier; Fernando Scavasin; Guilherme Toldo	Mexico; Raul Arizaga; Jesús Beltran; Daniel Gómez
2019	United States; Race Imboden; Nick Itkin; Gerek Meinhardt	Brazil; Henrique Marques; Heitor Shimbo; Guilherme Toldo; Alexandre de Camargo	Canada; Mikhail Sweet; Seraphim Hsieh Jarov; Maximilien van Haaster; Eli Schenkel
2023	United States; Gerek Meinhardt; Nick Itkin; Miles Chamley-Watson	Canada; Maximilien Van Haaster; Blake Broszus; Patrick Liu	Brazil; Pedro Marostega; Guilherme Toldo; Henrique Marques

=== Individual sabre ===
Games	Gold	Silver	Bronze
1951	Tibor Nyilas; United States	George Worth; United States	Estevão Molnar; Brazil
1955	Antonio Haro; Mexico	George Worth; United States	Rex Dyer; United States
1959	Allan Kwartler; United States	Walter Farber; United States	Teodoro Goliardi; Uruguay
1963	Michael D'Asaro Sr. United States	Walter Farber; United States	Chaba Pallaghy; United States
1967	Anthony Keane; United States	Román Quinos; Argentina	Les Samek; Canada
1971	Alex Orban; United States	Manuel Ortíz; Cuba	Román Quinos; Argentina
1975	Manuel Ortíz; Cuba	Guzman Salazar; Cuba	Peter Westbrook; United States
1979	Manuel Ortíz; Cuba	Peter Westbrook; United States	José Laverdecia; Cuba
1983	Peter Westbrook; United States	Manuel Ortíz; Cuba	Jean-Paul Banos; Canada
1987	Jean-Paul Banos; Canada	Peter Westbrook; United States	Jean-Marie Banos; Canada
1991	Steve Mormando; United States	Alexis Leyva; Cuba	Michael Lofton; United States
1995	Peter Westbrook; United States	Aristides Faure; Cuba	Alexis Leyva; Cuba
1999	Cándido Maya; Cuba	Akhnaten Spencer-El; United States	Michel Boulos; Canada
1999	Cándido Maya; Cuba	Akhnaten Spencer-El; United States	Aristides Faure; Cuba
2003	Ivan Lee; United States	Carlos Bravo; Venezuela	Michel Boulos; Canada; Jason Rogers; United States
2007	Philippe Beaudry; Canada	James Williams; United States	Renzo Agresta; Brazil; Nicolas Mayer; Canada
2011	Philippe Beaudry; Canada	Tim Morehouse; United States	Hernán Jansen; Venezuela
2011	Philippe Beaudry; Canada	Tim Morehouse; United States	Joseph Polossifakis; Canada
2015	Eli Dershwitz; United States	Joseph Polossifakis; Canada	Renzo Agresta; Brazil
2015	Eli Dershwitz; United States	Joseph Polossifakis; Canada	Ricardo Bustamante; Argentina
2019	Daryl Homer; United States	Pascual Di Tella; Argentina	Harold Rodríguez; Cuba
2019	Daryl Homer; United States	Pascual Di Tella; Argentina	Shaul Gordon; Canada
2023	Andrew Doddo; United States	Eliécer Romero; Venezuela	Fares Arfa; Canada
2023	Andrew Doddo; United States	Eliécer Romero; Venezuela	Shaul Gordon; Canada

=== Team sabre ===
Games	Gold	Silver	Bronze
1951	United States; George Worth; Nathaniel Lubell; Byron Krieger; Fred Weber; Miguel de Capriles; Tibor Nyilas	Argentina; Ercole Gonzalez; Guillermo Watkins; Fernando Huergo; José Casanova; Manuel Agüero; Edgardo Pomini	Brazil; Estevão Molnar; Federico Serrao; Matt Hugler; Virgilio Damásio de Sá
1955	United States; George Worth; Rex Dyer; Tibor Nyilas; Allan Kwartler	Uruguay; Jose Lardizabel; Ricardo Rimini; Teodoro Goliardi; Juan Paladino	Argentina; Daniel Sande; Florencio Watkins; Fernando Huergo; Félix Galimi
1959	United States; Walter Farber; William Goering; Allan Kwartler; Robert Blum; Tibor Nyilas; George Worth	Argentina; Manuel Agüero; José Casanova; Gustae Velaxquez; Rafael González	Canada; John Andru; Joseph Vidz; Paul Szabocsy; Carl Schwende
1963	United States; Ed Richards; Harold Mayer; Alfonso Morales; Miklos Chaba Pallaghy; Walter Farber; Michael D'Asaro Sr.	Argentina; Juan Carlos Bascolo; Guillermo Saucedo; Alfredo Juan Hernandez; Julián Velásquez; Floro Díaz	Chile; Roberto Lowy; Hector Bravo; Sergio Riveros; Jose Benko
1967	United States; Anthony Keane; Walter Farber; Thomas Balla; Csaba Gall	Argentina; Román Quinos; Norberto Mattiazo; Alberto Lanteri; Gustavo Vassallo	Canada; John Andru; Peter Samek; Les Samek; Robert Foxcroft
1971	Cuba; Francisco de la Torre; Manuel Ortíz; Guzman Salazar	United States; Alex Orban; Anthony Keane; Jenő Hámori; William Goering	Mexico; Vicente Calderón; Gustavo Chapela; Román Gómez
1975	Cuba; Lazaro Mora; Francisco de la Torre; Manuel Ortíz; Guzman Salazar	United States; Peter Westbrook; Paul Apostol; Stephen Kaplan; Alex Orban; Thomas Losonczy	Argentina; José Casanovas; Juan Gavajda; Marcelo Méndez; Fernando Lupiz
1979	Cuba; Manuel Ortíz; Ramón Hernández; José Laverdecia; Guzman Salazar	United States; Peter Westbrook; Philip Reilly; Stanley Lekach; Edgar House	Argentina; Jose Luis Cinchini; Atilio Tass; José Casanovas; Tomas Remete
1983	Cuba; Manuel Ortíz; Jesús Ortiz; José Laverdecia; Jorge Luis Trejo	United States; Peter Westbrook; Philip Reilly; Stan Lekach; Edgar House; Steve Mormando	Canada; Jean-Paul Banos; Jean-Marie Banos; Claude Marcil; Eli Sukunda; Marc Lavoie
1987	Cuba; José Laverdecia; Jorge Trejo; Carlos Trejo; Walfrido Vidal; Jesús Ortiz	United States; Peter Westbrook; Bob Cottingham; Steve Mormando; Michael Lofton; Paul Friedberg	Canada; Wulfe Balk; Jean-Marie Banos; Jean-Paul Banos; Danek Nowosielski; Luc Rocheleau
1991	Cuba; Agustin Garcia; Pedro Cabezas; Alexis Leiva; Geovanis Perez; Aristides Foure	United States; Peter Westbrook; Steve Mormando; Michael Lofton; John Friedberg; David Stollman	Canada; Jean-Paul Banos; Jean-Marie Banos; Bruno Deschênes; Tony Plourde; Evens Gravel
1995	United States; Peter Westbrook; John Friedberg; Michael D'Asaro Jr. Tom Strzalkowski	Cuba; Alexis Leyva; Aristides Faure; Pedro Cabezas; Agustin Garcia	Canada; Leszek Nowosielski; Jean-Marie Banos; Tony Plourde; Maxime Soucy
1999	Canada; Michel Boulos; Evens Gravel; Marc Hassoun	Cuba; Abel Caballero; Cándido Maya; Aristides Faure; Elvis Gregory	United States; Terrence Lasker; Herby Raynaud; Keeth Smart; Akhnaten Spencer-El
2003	United States; Weston Kelsey; Ivan Lee; Jason Rogers; Adam Crompton	Venezuela; Carlos Bravo; Eliézer Rincones; Charles Briceño; Juan Silva	Cuba; Abel Caballero; Yunior Naranjo; Cándido Maya; Abraham O'Reilly
2007	United States; Benjamin Igoe; Benjamin Ungar; James Williams; Tim Hagamen	Canada; Jean-Pierre Seguin; Michel Boulos; Nicolas Mayer; Philippe Beaudry	Argentina; Alexander Achten; Diego Drajer; Jose Felix Dominguez; Ricardo Bustamante
2011	United States; Benjamin Igoe; Tim Morehouse; James Williams	Canada; Joseph Polossifakis; Philippe Beaudry; Vincent Couturier; Anthony Prymack	Brazil; Renzo Agresta; William De Moraes; Tywilliam Pacheco; Heitor Shimbo
2015	United States; Eli Dershwitz; Daryl Homer; Jeff Spear	Canada; Shaul Gordon; Joseph Polossifakis; Mark Peros	Argentina; Ricardo Bustamante; Pascual Di Tella; Stefano Lucchetti
2019	United States; Jeffrey Spear; Eli Dershwitz; Daryl Homer	Canada; Eli Schenkel; Shaul Gordon; Fares Arfa; Joseph Polossifakis	Colombia; Luis Enrique Correa; Sebastián Cuéllar; Pablo Trochez
2023i	Canada; Francois Cauchon; Shaul Gordon; Fares Arfa	United States; Josef Cohen; Andrew Doddo; Filip Dolegiewicz	Venezuela; Abraham Rodríguez; Eliécer Romero; José Quintero

== Women's events ==
=== Individual épée ===
Games	Gold	Silver	Bronze
1951–1983	not included in the Pan American Games program		
1987 Indianapolis	Tamara Esteri; Cuba	Yamila Figueroa; Cuba	Vincent Bradford; United States
1991 Havana	Taymi Chappé; Cuba	Angélica Dueñas; Mexico	Yolitzin Martínez; Mexico
1995 Mar del Plata	Leslie Marx; United States	Milagros Palma; Cuba	Yolitzin Martínez; Mexico
1995 Mar del Plata	Leslie Marx; United States	Milagros Palma; Cuba	Yurina Suárez; Cuba
1999 Winnipeg	Mirayda García; Cuba	Tamara Esteri; Cuba	Elida Agüero; Argentina
1999 Winnipeg	Mirayda García; Cuba	Tamara Esteri; Cuba	Nhi Lan Le; United States
2003 Santo Domingo	Eimey Gómez; Cuba	Sherraine Schalm; Canada	Endrina Álvarez; Venezuela
2003 Santo Domingo	Eimey Gómez; Cuba	Sherraine Schalm; Canada	Jesika Jiménez; Panama
2007 Rio de Janeiro	Courtney Hurley; United States	Julie Leprohon; Canada	Angela Espinoza; Colombia
2007 Rio de Janeiro	Courtney Hurley; United States	Julie Leprohon; Canada	Clarisse Menezes; Brazil
2011 Guadalajara	Kelley Hurley; United States	Courtney Hurley; United States	Elida Agüero; Argentina
2011 Guadalajara	Kelley Hurley; United States	Courtney Hurley; United States	Yamirka Rodríguez; Cuba
2015 Toronto	Katharine Holmes; United States	Violeta Ramírez Peguero; Dominican Republic	Nathalie Moellhausen; Brazil
2015 Toronto	Katharine Holmes; United States	Violeta Ramírez Peguero; Dominican Republic	María Martínez; Venezuela
2019	Katharine Holmes; United States	Patrizia Piovesan; Venezuela	Clara Isabel Di Tella; Argentina
2019	Katharine Holmes; United States	Patrizia Piovesan; Venezuela	Nathalie Moellhausen; Brazil

=== Team épée ===
Games	Gold	Silver	Bronze
1951–1987	not included in the Pan American Games program		
1991 Havana	United States; Margo Miller; Donna Stone; Elaine Cheris; Laurel Clark Skillman; Cathy McClellan	Cuba; Yamila Figueroa; Taymi Chappé; Dianicelis Marín; Maria Pérez; Iliana Duarte	Mexico; Yolitzin Martínez; Angélica Dueñas; María de los Ángeles García; Josefa Zapata; Lourdes Roldán
1995 Mar del Plata	United States; Leslie Marx; Margo Miller; Rachel Hough; Donna Stone	Cuba; Milagros Palma; Yurina Suárez; Mirayda García; Zuleydis Ortiz	Canada; Sherraine Schalm; Maureen Griffin; Heather Landymore; Marie-Françoise Hervieu
1999 Winnipeg	Cuba; Eimey Gómez; Zuleydis Ortiz; Tamara Esteri; Mirayda García	Canada; Heather Landymore; Monique Kavelaars; Sherraine Schalm	United States; Stephanie Eim; Nhi Lan Le; Julie Smith; Sarah Orman
2003 Santo Domingo	Cuba; Eimey Gómez; Zuleydis Ortiz; Misleydis Oña; Arianne Ribot	United States; Kelley Hurley; Stephanie Eim; Elisabeth Spilman; Erinn Smart	Canada; Sherraine Schalm; Catherine Dunnette; Marie-Ève Pelletier
2007 Rio de Janeiro	not included in the Pan American Games program		
2011 Guadalajara	United States; Lindsay Campbell; Courtney Hurley; Kelley Hurley	Canada; Sherraine Schalm; Ainsley Switzer; Sandra Sassine; Daria Jorquera	Mexico; Alexandra Avena; Andrea Millán; Alejandra Terán; Alely Hernández
2015 Toronto	United States; Anna van Brummen; Katharine Holmes; Katarzyna Trzopek	Venezuela; María Martínez; Eliana Lugo; Dayana Martinez	Brazil; Nathalie Moellhausen; Amanda Simeão; Rayssa Costa
2019	United States; Isis Washington; Catherine Nixon; Katharine Holmes	Cuba; Aymara Tablada; Yamirka Rodríguez; Seily Mendoza; Diamelys González	Venezuela; Patrizia Piovesan; María Gabriela Martínez; Lizze Asis

=== Individual foil ===
Games	Gold	Silver	Bronze
1951 Buenos Aires	Elsa Irigoyen; Argentina	Irma de Antequeda; Argentina	Lilia Rositto; Argentina
1955 Mexico City	Maxine Mitchell; United States	Irma de Antequeda; Argentina	Eve Siegel; United States
1959 Chicago	Pilar Roldán; Mexico	Maxine Mitchell; United States	Stella Espino; Panama
1963 São Paulo	Mireya Rodríguez; Cuba	Harriet King; United States	Janice Romary; United States
1967 Winnipeg	Pilar Roldán; Mexico	Harriet King; United States	Pacita Wiedel; Canada
1971 Cali	Margarita Rodríguez; Cuba	Ruth White; United States	Irene Forbes; Cuba
1975 Mexico City	Margarita Rodríguez; Cuba	Nikki Franke; United States	Blanca Estrada; Mexico
1979 San Juan	Mercedes del Risco; Cuba	Margarita Rodríguez; Cuba	Nikki Franke; United States
1983 Caracas	Margarita Rodríguez; Cuba	Lourdes Lozano; Mexico	Clara Alfonso; Cuba
1987 Indianapolis	Caitlin Bilodeaux; United States	Madeleine Philion; Canada	Caridad Estrada; Cuba
1991 Havana	Caridad Estrada; Cuba	Sandra Giancola; Argentina	Caitlin Bilodeaux; United States
1995 Mar del Plata	Ann Marsh; United States	Idorys Díaz; Cuba	Bárbara Hernández; Cuba
1995 Mar del Plata	Ann Marsh; United States	Idorys Díaz; Cuba	Felicia Zimmermann; United States
1999 Winnipeg	Migsey Dussu; Cuba	Cecilia Esteva; Mexico	Julie Mahoney; Canada
1999 Winnipeg	Migsey Dussu; Cuba	Cecilia Esteva; Mexico	Adlim Benítez; Cuba
2003 Santo Domingo	Mariana González; Venezuela	Emily Cross; United States	Arianne Ribot; Cuba
2003 Santo Domingo	Mariana González; Venezuela	Emily Cross; United States	Erinn Smart; United States
2007 Rio de Janeiro	Mariana González; Venezuela	Hanna Thompson; United States	Misleydis Compañy; Cuba
2007 Rio de Janeiro	Mariana González; Venezuela	Hanna Thompson; United States	Monica Kwan; Canada
2011 Guadalajara	Lee Kiefer; United States	Nzingha Prescod; United States	Monica Peterson; Canada
2011 Guadalajara	Lee Kiefer; United States	Nzingha Prescod; United States	Nataly Michel; Mexico
2015 Toronto	Lee Kiefer; United States	Saskia Loretta Garcia; Colombia	Alanna Goldie; Canada
2015 Toronto	Lee Kiefer; United States	Saskia Loretta Garcia; Colombia	Nicole Ross; United States
2019	Lee Kiefer; United States	Jessica Guo; Canada	Eleanor Harvey; Canada
2019	Lee Kiefer; United States	Jessica Guo; Canada	Bia Bulcão; Brazil

=== Team foil ===
Games	Gold	Silver	Bronze
1951–1955	not included in the Pan American Games program		
1959 Chicago	United States; Harriet King; Maxine Mitchell; Vivienne Sokol	Panama; Marlene Worthington; Lilia Lombana; Stella Espino	Venezuela; Rosa Navarro; Ingrid Sander; Belkis Leal
1963 São Paulo	United States; Vivienne Sokol; Maxine Mitchell; Janice Romary; Anne Drungis; Tommy Angell	Venezuela; Ursula de Gómez; Belkis Leal; Norma Santini; Rosa Navarro; Omaira Rodríguez	Argentina; Elda Casarino; Raquel Arrieta; Irma de Antequeda; Elsa Irigoyen; Esther de Díaz
1967 Winnipeg	United States; Harriet King; Janice Romary; Maxine Mitchell; Veronica Smith	Cuba; Margarita Rodríguez; Milady Tack-Fang; Norma Obrador; Alina Exposito	Canada; Pacita Wiedel; Donna Hennyey; Sigrid Chatel; Louise Agoues
1971 Cali	United States; Tommy Angell; Emily Grompone; Harriet King; Ruth White	Cuba; Margarita Rodríguez; María Esther García; Marlene Infante; Irene Forbes	Colombia; Aleyda Rubio; Mery Bejarano; Gloria García; Neila de Vidal; Teresa Vargas
1975 Mexico City	Cuba; María Esther García; Milady Tack-Fang; Marlene Font; Margarita Rodríguez; Nancy Uranga	Canada; Donna Hennyey; Louise-Marie Leblanc; Susan Stewart; Chantal Gilbert	United States; Denise O'Connor; Nikki Franke; Sheila Armstrong; Ann O'Donnell; Gay D'Asaro
1979 San Juan	Cuba; Margarita Rodríguez; María Esther García; Mercedes del Risco; Clara Alfonso; Mercedes Atencio	Canada; Chantal Payer; Louise-Marie Leblanc; Patricia Balz; Jacynthe Poirier	United States; Debra Waples; Gay D'Asaro; Ann O'Donnell; Nikki Franke; Vincent Bradford
1983 Caracas	Cuba; Margarita Rodríguez; María Esther García; Mercedes del Risco; Clara Alfonso; Caridad Estrada	United States; Debra Waples; Jana Angelakis; Margo Miller; Vincent Bradford; Andrea Metkus	Argentina; María Alicia Sinigaglia; Sandra Giancola; Silvana Giancola; Constanza Oriani; Gabriela Laperuta
1987 Indianapolis	United States; Caitlin Bilodeaux; Elaine Cheris; Mary O'Neill; Sharon Monplaisir	Cuba; Bárbara Hernández; Caridad Estrada; Edelmis Marquez; Hildelisa Rodríguez	Mexico; Fabiana López; Maria Lozano; Pilar Roldán; Blanca Estrada
1991 Havana	United States; Caitlin Bilodeaux; Sharon Monplaisir; Molly Sullivan; Ann Marsh; Jane Hall	Cuba; Bárbara Hernández; Caridad Estrada; Maylia Acuña; Migsey Dussu; Mirayda García	Argentina; Andrea Chiuchich; Sandra Giancola; Yanina Iannuzzi; María Laura Lede
1995 Mar del Plata	Cuba; Idorys Díaz; Bárbara Hernández; Migsey Dussu; Caridad Estrada	United States; Ann Marsh; Felicia Zimmermann; Olga Chernyak; Monique de Bruin	Argentina; Alejandra Carbone; Sandra Giancola; Dolores Pampin; Yanina Iannuzzi
1999 Winnipeg	Cuba; Adlim Benítez; Migsey Dussu; Odalys Gorguet; Lizmaite Trujillo	Venezuela; Johana Fuenmayor; Mariana González; Sandra Torres	United States; Stephanie Eim; Susan Jennings; Julie Smith; Iris Zimmermann
2003 Santo Domingo	not included in the Pan American Games program		
2007 Rio de Janeiro	Venezuela; Johana Fuenmayor; Mariana González; María Martínez; Yulitza Suárez	Canada; Louise-Hélène Bouchard; Elise Daoust; Monica Kwan; Sandra Sassine	Cuba; Misleydis Compañy; Eimey Gómez; Annis Hechavarría; Arianne Ribot
2011 Guadalajara	United States; Lee Kiefer; Nzingha Prescod; Doris Willette; Ibtihaj Muhammad	Canada; Alanna Goldie; Monica Peterson; Kelleigh Ryan; Sandra Sassine	Venezuela; Mariana González; Johana Fuenmayor; Yulitza Suárez; María Martínez
2015 Toronto	Canada; Alanna Goldie; Eleanor Harvey; Kelleigh Ryan	United States; Lee Kiefer; Nzingha Prescod; Nicole Ross	Mexico; Denisse Hernández; Nataly Michel; Melissa Rebolledo
2019	United States; Nicole Ross; Lee Kiefer; Jacqueline Dubrovich	Canada; Alanna Goldie; Gabriella Page; Jessica Guo; Eleanor Harvey	Mexico; Denisse Hernández; Melissa Rebolledo; Nataly Michel

=== Individual sabre ===
Games	Gold	Silver	Bronze
1951–1999	not included in the Pan American Games program		
2003 Santo Domingo	Sada Jacobson; United States	Alejandra Benítez; Venezuela	Ana Faez; Cuba
2003 Santo Domingo	Sada Jacobson; United States	Alejandra Benítez; Venezuela	Emily Jacobson; United States
2007 Rio de Janeiro	Mailyn González; Cuba	Alexis Jemal; United States	Emma Baratta; United States
2007 Rio de Janeiro	Mailyn González; Cuba	Alexis Jemal; United States	Sandra Sassine; Canada
2011 Guadalajara	Mariel Zagunis; United States	Alejandra Benítez; Venezuela	Eileen Grench; Panama
2011 Guadalajara	Mariel Zagunis; United States	Alejandra Benítez; Venezuela	Yaritza Goulet; Cuba
2015 Toronto	Dagmara Wozniak; United States	Alejandra Benítez; Venezuela	Gabriella Page; Canada
2015 Toronto	Dagmara Wozniak; United States	Alejandra Benítez; Venezuela	María Belén Pérez Maurice; Argentina
2019	Anne-Elizabeth Stone; United States	María Belén Pérez Maurice; Argentina	Alejandra Benítez; Venezuela
2019	Anne-Elizabeth Stone; United States	María Belén Pérez Maurice; Argentina	Gabriella Page; Canada

=== Team sabre ===
Games	Gold	Silver	Bronze
1951–2003	not included in the Pan American Games program		
2007 Rio de Janeiro	Cuba; Misleydis Compañy; Ana Faez; Mailyn González; Jennifer Morales	United States; Emma Baratta; Eileen Grench; Alexis Jemal; Hanna Thompson	Canada; Julie Cloutier; Monica Kwan; Olya Ovtchinnikova; Sandra Sassine
2011 Guadalajara	United States; Ibtihaj Muhammad; Mariel Zagunis; Dagmara Wozniak; Lindsay Campbell	Mexico; Úrsula González; Angélica Aguilar; Angélica Larios; Alejandra Terán	Venezuela; Alejandra Benítez; Yulitza Suárez; María Blanco; Patricia Contreras
2015 Toronto	United States; Ibtihaj Muhammad; Dagmara Wozniak; Mariel Zagunis	Mexico; Úrsula González; Paola Pliego; Julieta Toledo	Venezuela; Alejandra Benítez; Milagros Pastran; Shia Rodríguez
2019	United States; Monica Aksamit; Chloe Fox-Gitomer; Anne-Elizabeth Stone	Dominican Republic; Heyddys Valentín; Rossy Félix; Violeta Ramírez; Melody Martínez	Canada; Marissa Ponich; Pamela Brind'Amour; Gabriella Page; Eleanor Harvey
