= Fencing at the 1951 Pan American Games =

Fencing at the 1951 Pan American Games in Buenos Aires, Argentina.

== Results ==
=== Men's events ===
Event	Gold	Silver	Bronze
Individual épée	Antonio Villamil; Argentina	Benito Ramos; Mexico	Edward Vebell; United States
Team épée	Argentina; Argentina	United States of America; United States	Cuba; Cuba
Individual foil	Félix Domingo Galimi; Argentina	José Rodríguez; Argentina	Nathaniel Lubell; United States
Team foil	United States of America; United States	Argentina; Argentina	Cuba; Cuba
Individual sabre	Tibor Nyilas; United States	George Worth; United States	Estevão Molnar; Brazil
Team sabre	United States	Argentina	Brazil

=== Women's events ===
Event	Gold	Silver	Bronze
Individual foil	Elsa Irigoyen; Argentina	Irma de Antequeda; Argentina	Lilia Rositto; Argentina
Team foil	United States	Panama	Venezuela
