= Fencing at the 1983 Pan American Games =

Fencing at the 1983 Pan American Games lists the results of all fencing-shooting events held at the 1983 Pan American Games in Caracas, Venezuela. Events for both men and women were held.

== Men's events ==
Event	Gold	Silver	Bronze
Individual épée	Agapito Nussa; Cuba	Jean-Marc Chouinard; Canada	Timothy Glass; United States}
Team épée	Canada; Canada	United States of America; United States	Venezuela; Venezuela
Individual foil	Efigenio Favier Sando; Cuba	José Rafael Magallanes; Venezuela	Gregory Massialas; United States
Team foil	Cuba; Cuba	United States of America; United States	Venezuela; Venezuela
Individual sabre	Peter Westbrook; United States	Luis Manuel Ortíz; Cuba	Jean-Paul Banos; Canada
Team sabre	Cuba; Cuba	United States of America; United States	Canada; Canada

== Women's events ==
Event	Gold	Silver	Bronze
Individual foil	Margarita Rodríguez; Cuba	Lourdes Lozano; Mexico	Clara Alfonso; Cuba
Team foil	Cuba; Cuba	United States of America; United States	Argentina; Argentina

== Medal table ==
Place	Nation	Gold medal	Silver medal	Bronze medal	Total
1	Cuba	6	1	1	8
2	United States	1	4	2	7
3	Canada	1	1	2	4
4	Venezuela	0	1	2	3
5	Mexico	0	1	0	1
6	Argentina	0	0	1	1
Total		8	8	8	24
