= Edgardo Pomini =

Argentine fencer (1917–1958)

Personal information
- Full name: Edgardo Roberto Pomini Rampezzotti
- Born: 8 October 1917
- Died: 23 October 1958 (aged 41) Buenos Aires, Argentina

Sport
- Sport: Fencing
Medal record
Men's fencing
Representing Argentina
Pan American Games
Silver medal – second place	1951 Buenos Aires	Team sabre

Edgardo Roberto Pomini Rampezzotti (8 October 1917 – 23 October 1958) was an Argentine fencer. He competed in the individual and team sabre events at the 1948 and 1952 Summer Olympics. At the fencing at the 1951 Pan American Games, he won silver in the team sabre.
