= Abram Cohen =

American fencer (1924–2016)

Personal information
- Born: October 25, 1924 Brooklyn, New York, U.S.
- Died: February 2, 2016 (aged 91) Fishkill, New York, U.S.
- Height: 6 ft 2.5 in (189.2 cm)
- Weight: 198 lb (90 kg)
- Spouse: Simone Cohen (m. 1959–2016)

Sport
- Country: United States
- Sport: Fencing
- Events: Épée, foil, and sabre
- College team: CCNY
- Club: Fencers Club

Achievements and titles
- Olympic finals: 1956 Summer Olympics Round One
- World finals: 1955 Pan American Games team épée (2nd place)

Abram "Abe" Dreyer Cohen (October 25, 1924 – February 2, 2016) was an American Olympic foil, épée, and sabre fencer.

Cohen was born in Brooklyn, New York, and was Jewish. His brother Herb Cohen competed at the 1961 Maccabiah Games in Israel, won the NCAA foil championship in 1961–62, won a bronze medal in individual foil and a gold medal with the US foil team at the 1963 Pan American Games, was Amateur Fencers League of America (AFLA) foil champion in 1964, and fenced individual and team foil for the United States in the 1964 Summer Olympics.

== Fencing career ==
He fenced for the Fencers Club in New York. In college, in 1948 he was a member of the NCAA Champion CCNY team.

In 1955 and 1956 he won the épée AAU/Amateur Fencers League of America (AFLA) United States National Fencing Championship.

He won the silver medal in the 1955 Pan American Games team épée with Dick Dyer, Skip Shurtz, and Harold Goldsmith.

Cohen competed in the team épée and sabre events at the 1956 Summer Olympics in Melbourne.

He was the AFLA President's 3-Weapon Champion in 1955 and 1956 and the winner of the 1957 and 1958 Giorgio Santelli Masters’ Sabre.

He is a member of the US Fencing Hall of Fame (inducted in 2005), and the CCNY Athletic Hall of Fame (inducted in 1971).

== See also ==
- List of USFA Division I National Champions
- List of USFA Hall of Fame members
