= Albert Wolff (fencer) =

American fencer (1906–1989)

Personal information
- Nationality: French; American
- Born: July 13, 1906 Barr, Bas-Rhin, France
- Died: June 14, 1989 (aged 82) Scottsdale, Arizona, U.S.

Sport
- Country: United States
- Sport: Fencing
- Club: Louisville Fencers
Medal record
Men's fencing
Representing United States
Pan American Games
Gold medal – first place	1951 Buenos Aires	Team foil
Silver medal – second place	1951 Buenos Aires	Team épée

Albert Wolff (July 13, 1906 – June 14, 1989) was an American Olympic foil and épée fencer. Wolff was born in Barr, Bas-Rhin, France, and was Jewish. He later lived in Louisville, Kentucky, in the United States.

== Biography ==
Wolff qualified for the French Olympic Team but boycotted the 1936 Summer Olympics in Berlin, Germany, withdrawing from France's national team on principle because he was a Jew. He said: "I cannot participate in anything sponsored by Adolf Hitler, even for France."

He fought in the French Army during World War II, and was awarded the Croix de Guerre by France for bravery during fierce fighting on the Maginot Line. The Germans captured him and put him in a Jewish war camp. Wolff escaped, and made it to Portugal, and then to the United States in 1941. He joined the US Army, and returned to Europe, fighting the Germans.

After the war was over, he petitioned the Amateur Fencers League of America (AFLA) to allow him to fence in the US National Fencing Championships. He was AFLA individual national épée champion in 1946.

He competed for the United States at the age of 42 in the 1948 Summer Olympics in London in individual and team épée, and at the age of 46 in the 1952 Summer Olympics in Helsinki in team épée. His fencing club was the Louisville Fencers.

In 1948, he was Athlete of the Year in Kentucky. He won a gold medal in team foil, and a silver medal in team épée, at the 1951 Pan American Games.

Wolff died in Scottsdale, Arizona, at the age of 82.

== See also ==
- List of USFA Division I National Champions
