= Jean-Marie Banos =

Canadian fencer (born 1962)

Personal information
- Born: 10 February 1962 (age 64) Lavelanet, France

Sport
- Sport: Fencing
Medal record
Representing Canada
Pan American Games
Bronze medal – third place	1983 Caracas	Team sabre
Bronze medal – third place	1987 Indianapolis	Individual sabre
Bronze medal – third place	1987 Indianapolis	Team sabre
Bronze medal – third place	1991 Havana	Individual sabre
Bronze medal – third place	1991 Havana	Team sabre
Bronze medal – third place	1995 Mar del Plata	Team sabre

Jean-Marie Banos (born 10 February 1962) is a Canadian former fencer. He competed in the individual and team sabre events at four consecutive Olympic Games between 1984 and 1996. His brother, Jean-Paul Banos, also fenced for Canada at four Olympic Games. He is married to Caitlin Bilodeaux, who fenced for the United States at the 1988 and 1992 Summer Olympics.

== Personal life ==
After retiring, he became a teacher at Collège Jean-de-Brébeuf and became responsible for the school's fencing program until his retirement.
