= Byron Krieger =

American fencer (1920–2015)

Personal information
- Born: July 20, 1920 Detroit, Michigan, U.S.
- Died: November 8, 2015 (aged 95) Boca Raton, Florida, U.S.
Medal record
Men's fencing
Representing United States
Pan American Games
Gold medal – first place	1951 Buenos Aires	Team foil
Gold medal – first place	1951 Buenos Aires	Team sabre
Silver medal – second place	1951 Buenos Aires	Team épée
Maccabiah Games
Gold medal – first place	1957 Israel	Individual sabre
Bronze medal – third place	1957 Israel	Individual foil

Byron Lester Krieger (July 20, 1920 – November 8, 2015) was an American foil, sabre and épée fencer. Krieger represented the United States in the Olympics in 1952 in Helsinki and 1956 in Melbourne, and in the 1951 Pan American Games where he won two gold medals.

== Early life ==
Krieger was born and raised in Detroit, Michigan, lived in Southfield as an adult, and was Jewish. He graduated from Northwestern High School, where he was a member of the school fencing club under the direction of his English teacher, Beatrice Merriam. The teacher encouraged the boy to start training at Salle de Tuscan Fencing Club.

== Fencing career ==
At age 16 he became the youngest fencer to reach the State Championship finals, where he placed 3rd in foil.

Krieger attended Wayne State University in Michigan, where de Tuscan coached. Krieger began fencing all 3 weapons, and captained the varsity team in 1940–42. He was Wayne State's first Intercollegiate Fencing Association/NCAA champion in foil in 1942. He was 62–7 in dual meets at WSU, including 30–0 in foil. He was named an All-American.

Krieger established himself as a top-ranked fencer competing in an All Star Midwest team against Canada, Mexico, Cuba, and the U.S. Sectional teams. He also represented the United States in the British-American matches in Toronto, where he was undefeated in the U.S. victory.

Krieger won gold medals in team foil and team sabre and the team silver in épée at the 1951 Pan American Games in Buenos Aires, Argentina. He came in 6th in both the individual foil and sabre events. He fenced 113 bouts in 10 days—more than any fencer from any other country. Krieger was the only American to defeat the Argentine National Champion.

In 1957 Krieger won the individual saber championship; a gold medal in the foil team (with Olympic teammate Al Axelrod), and a second place in individual foil at the 1957 Maccabiah Games in Israel. He was the lone Michigan athlete to represent the United States at the Games.

Krieger won 55 state and Midwest titles in all three fencing weapons, including all three weapons in the same year five times.

Krieger competed twice for the United States at the Olympics. He competed in the team foil event at the 1952 Summer Olympics in Helsinki, reaching the quarterfinals. At the 1956 Summer Olympics in Melbourne, at 36 years of age, he was eliminated in the opening round, and reached the final round in team foil with the American team, placing fourth. Krieger competed in the matches against France and Italy, and was the first American fencer to beat the French two-time Olympic champion Christian d'Oriola. The entire USA Foil Fencing Team at the 1956 Olympics was Jewish, with the other Jewish fencers being Daniel Bukantz, Albert Axelrod, Nathaniel Lubell, and Harold Goldsmith.

== Halls of Fame and awards ==
Krieger received the Detroit Sports Guild Outstanding Athlete Award in 1951. He was elected to the Michigan Amateur Sports Hall of Fame in 1974, the Wayne State University Athletic Hall of Fame in 1976 (one of six original inductees), and the Michigan Jewish Sports Hall of Fame in 1986 in West Bloomfield, Michigan/ He was officially rated as one of the nation's top 10 fencers for 15 years during his career. His Olympic jacket warm-up suit and press photographs are on loan at the Museum of American Fencing.

== Later life ==
Krieger was selected to referee Olympia style Latin American Games in Venezuela and Guatemala. He served for many years as both President of the Michigan Division of the Amateur Fencers' League and the Salle de Tuscan Fencing Club, and devoted many years to officiating at State and Intercollegiate matches. He had a long career with the Internal Revenue Service in Detroit, and retired in 1979 as Associate Chief Appeals. He then opened a full-time private practice.

Krieger met his wife, actress/writer Jocelyn Ruth, also from Detroit, in 1956 while he was training for the Olympics in New York City. They were founding members of the Young Israel of Southfield, and involved with the Detroit Chabad community. In 2015 they celebrated their 57th wedding anniversary with six children, 16 grandchildren, and 2 great-grandchildren. Krieger's grandson, Sam Larson, fenced for the Yeshiva University NCAA team 2012–15.

Krieger died at age 95 on November 8, 2015, from injuries he incurred in a fire in his home in Boca Raton, Florida. Krieger was a devout Jew and was observing the end of the Sabbath by lighting the traditional Havdalah candle, signifying the end of the Sabbath. Krieger suffered from Parkinson's disease, and the match he lit for the candle fell from his hands and onto his sweater. His wife of 78 years was with him at the time, and survived.

== See also ==
- List of select Jewish fencers
- List of NCAA fencing champions
