= Eduardo Sastre =

Argentine fencer

Personal information
- Born: 22 September 1910

Sport
- Sport: Fencing
Medal record
Men's fencing
Representing Argentina
Pan American Games
Silver medal – second place	1951 Buenos Aires	Team foil

Eduardo Sastre (born 22 September 1910, date of death unknown) is an Argentine fencer. He competed at the 1952 Summer Olympics.
