= Santiago Massini =

Argentine fencer (1914–2003)

Personal information
- Full name: Santiago José Massini Gochetti
- Born: 20 August 1914
- Died: 22 October 2003 (aged 89)

Sport
- Sport: Fencing
Medal record
Men's fencing
Representing Argentina
Pan American Games
Silver medal – second place	1951 Buenos Aires	Team foil

Santiago José Massini Gochetti (20 August 1914 – 22 October 2003) was an Argentine fencer. He competed at the 1952 and 1956 Summer Olympics.
