= William González (fencer) =

Colombian fencer (born 1970)

Personal information
- Born: 28 August 1970 (age 55) Medellín, Colombia

Sport
- Sport: Fencing
Medal record
Representing Colombia
Pan American Games
Silver medal – second place	1991 Havana	Team épée
Bronze medal – third place	1995 Mar del Plata	Team épée
Bronze medal – third place	1999 Winnipeg	Team épée
Central American and Caribbean Games
Silver medal – second place	1993 Ponce	Team épée
Silver medal – second place	1998 Maracaibo	Team épée
Bronze medal – third place	1990 Mexico City	Team épée
Bronze medal – third place	2002 San Salvador	Team épée

William Eulogio González Taborda (born 28 August 1970) is a Colombian fencer. He competed in the team épée event at the 1988 Summer Olympics.
