= Monique de Bruin =

Monique de Bruin may refer to:

- Monique de Bruin (cyclist) (born 1965), Dutch cyclist
- Monique de Bruin (fencer) (born 1977), American fencer
