= Raúl Martínez =

Raúl Martínez may refer to:

- Raúl Martínez (artist) (1927–1995), Cuban artist
- Raúl L. Martínez (born 1949), American Democratic politician
- Raúl Martínez (footballer, born 1987), Mexican football midfielder
- Raúl Martínez (footballer, born 2003), Mexican football centre-back
- Raúl Martínez Sambulá (born 1963), Honduran football player
- Raúl Martínez (fencer) (born 1926), Argentine Olympic fencer
- Raúl Martínez Colomer (born 1988), Puerto Rican swimmer
- Raúl Martínez (boxer) (born 1982), Mexican-American
- Raúl Martínez (taekwondo), Spanish taekwondoka
- Raúl Martínez (actor) (1920–1993), Mexican actor featured in ¿Por qué ya no me quieres?, Se solicitan modelos or La comadrita
- Raúl Martínez Solares, cinematographer, known from The Bandits of Cold River, Raffles or Women's Prison
- Raúl Martínez (wrestler), Cuban wrestler, 1991 and 1993 Greco-Roman world champion
- Raúl Martínez (rally driver), Argentinian World Rally Championship driver
- Raúl Martínez Crovetto (1921–1988), Argentinian botanist
