= Frederick Weber (fencer) =

American fencer

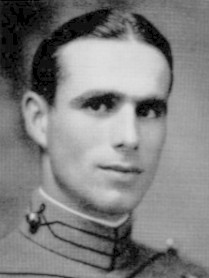
- As a West Point cadet

Personal information
- Full name: Frederick Reginia Weber
- Born: December 1, 1905 Kalamazoo, Michigan, U.S.
- Died: February 17, 1994 (aged 88) Lumber Bridge, North Carolina, U.S.

Sport
- Sport: Fencing, Modern pentathlon
Medal record
Men's fencing
Representing United States
Pan American Games
Gold medal – first place	1951 Buenos Aires	Team sabre
Silver medal – second place	1951 Buenos Aires	Team épée

Frederick Reginia Weber (December 1, 1905 – February 17, 1994) was an American épée fencer and modern pentathlete. He competed at the 1936 Summer Olympics.

== Biography ==
Frederick Reginia Weber was born on December 1, 1905. He graduated from the United States Military Academy at West Point in 1930.

He died in Lumber Bridge, North Carolina on February 17, 1994.
