= Donna Stone =

Donna Stone may refer to:

- Donna Stone (fencer) (born 1957), American fencer
- Donna Stone (politician) (1944–2023), American politician, member of the Delaware House of Representatives
- Donna J. Stone (1933–1994) , American poet and philanthropist
