= Fulvio Galimi =

Argentine fencer (1927–2016)

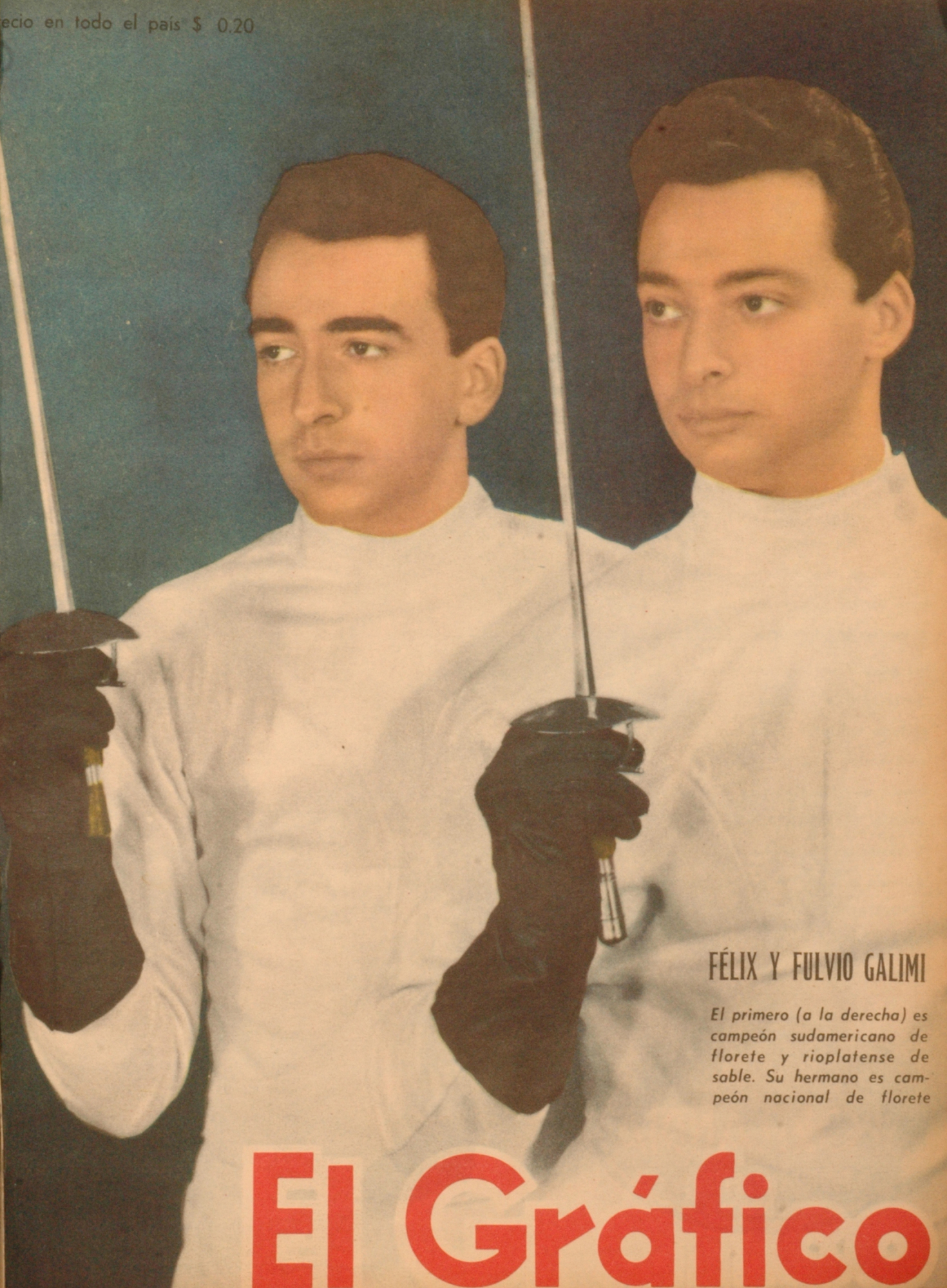
- Félix and Fulvio Galmi - El Gráfico, 1947

Personal information
- Full name: Fulvio Galimi Gherardi
- Born: 11 January 1927 Buenos Aires, Argentina
- Died: 3 June 2016 (aged 89)

Sport
- Sport: Fencing
Medal record
Men's fencing
Representing Argentina
Pan American Games
Silver medal – second place	1951 Buenos Aires	Team foil

Fulvio Galimi Gherardi (11 January 1927 – 3 June 2016) was an Argentine fencer who practiced all three weapons: foil, épée and sabre. He competed at the 1948 and 1952 Summer Olympics. He earned a silver medal in the individual foil event at the 1951 Pan American Games and three medals at the 1955 edition: gold in team foil and bronze in individual foil and team sabre.
