= Jorge Agostini =

Cuban fencer (1910–1955)

Personal information
- Full name: Jorge Agostini Villasana
- Born: 5 February 1910 Mayarí, Cuba
- Died: 9 June 1955 (aged 45) Havana, Cuba

Sport
- Country: Cuba
- Sport: Fencing, pistol shooting

Achievements and titles
- Olympic finals: 1948 Summer Olympics
Medal record
Men's fencing
Representing Cuba
Pan American Games
Bronze medal – third place	1951 Buenos Aires	Team épée
Bronze medal – third place	1951 Buenos Aires	Team foil

Jorge Agostini Villasana (5 February 1910 – 9 June 1955) was a Cuban military and government official, leading revolutionary, and athlete.

== Early life ==
Jorge Felipe Agostini Villasana was born 5 February 1910 in Mayarí, Cuba. Early in his life, Agostini became active in military activities. In September 1926, at the age of sixteen, he entered the Mariel Naval School, where he would graduate in 1931 as an alférez de fragata (frigate lieutenant). He was then assigned to the gunboat Patria, and later to serve directly under the orders of the Chief of the Northern Naval District of Cuba.

Agostini opposed Fulgencio Batista's coup in January 1934 and was therefore discharged from the Navy that February. He went into exile in the United States where he joined the military apparatus of the Organización Auténtica/"Authentic Organization" (OA) which was led by Emilio Laurent. He returned to Cuba following the political amnesty law of 1935, after which he became active in international sports on behalf of Cuba. Agostini participated in the 3rd Central American Sports Games where he won a silver medal in épée as well as a bronze medal in foil. However, as Batista's regime continued its repressive policies, Agostini again fled to the United States in 1936. While in New York he joined groups that plotted to overthrow Batista, however these efforts where ultimately stifled by internal divisions.

== Spanish Civil War ==
Agostini left the United States for Spain in 1937 to fight in defense of the Spanish Republic against the rise of Francisco Franco's forces. In Spain he was appointed technical commander in artillery and assigned to the destroyer ship Ulloa. While aboard the Ulloa he participated in the sinking of the Baleares, the flagship of the Falangist navy. By 1938 Agostini was commanding a C-4 submarine and participated in several battles, as a result he would be wounded twice. In the battle of Tcherchell off the coast of Morocco he successfully oversaw the sinking of the cruiser Canarias. In a morale contribution during the war, the Cuban brigade had its own battle hymn that was titled "Combatientes de la libertad" ("Freedom fighters"); set to music by popular Cuban composer Julio Cuevas Díaz, with its lyrics rewritten by Agostini (then Secretary of the Contingent), to read "We are the volunteers, the freedom fighters / black and white, of all races / united, united more and more / for democracy and universal peace."

However, as the war turned in favor of the Falangists, the Republican forces tasked Agostini, now with the rank of colonel, as among the chiefs responsible for the transfer of the International Brigades to Barcelona and ultimately out of Spain later that year. Upon reaching France through the Pyrenees with other ex-combatants as well as refugees, Agostini was detained by French forces in camps for processing for an extended period before finally being released to Cuba in 1940.

== Return to Cuba ==
After returning to Cuba, Agostini would travel to the United States now as an economic rather than political emigrant. He resided on the small merchant cargo ship Mambí, of which he was appointed captain. On 19 February 1941, he was reinstated in the Cuban Navy with his former rank and subsequently appointed professor of artillery at his alma mater, the Mariel naval school, and later as head of the Boca de Mariel post.

After the outbreak of World War II, Agostini would once again ascend rapidly through various posts. He was promoted to the rank of lieutenant in February 1942 and was assigned to the US naval flotilla that operated within Cuban ports. The following year he was sent to undergo a tactical course in anti-submarine warfare at the Training Center in Miami, Florida. In 1944 he became chief of several surface units of the Cuban navy as well as chief of the Boca de Camarioca naval post and, as an officer, he was transferred to the Directorate Department of the General Staff.

The June 1944 election of Ramón Grau San Martín as President of the Republic proved to be pivotal for Agostini's career as he became close to Grau's inner circle. He was first transferred to the Directorate Department of the General Staff of the Navy shortly after the election. In March 1945 he was appointed Assistant to the Chief of the Army and a month later was assigned to the Commission of the Military House within the Palatine Mansion. Finally, on 17 May Agostini was appointed Grau's Head of the Secret Service of the Presidential Palace.

In 1947 he joined the "Cayo Confites" plan to depose neighboring Dominican dictator Rafael Leónidas Trujillo. Aboard the Cinco Hermanas he was transporting a shipment of explosives when he received urgent instructions to anchor in Cárdenas Bay and go to the Presidential Palace, where he was informed that President Grau decided to suspend the project's execution. Agostini then continued as the Head of the Palace Secret Service although he eventually ceased to perform many of the effective tasks of the position during part of the terms of Grau and the new president, Carlos Prío Socarrás (elected in 1948), due to frequent political and ethical disputes with both presidents.

== Athletics career ==
As his governmental duties reduced during this period from the end of Grau's term and into Prío's, Agostini turned his focus back to international competitive athletics, especially fencing. Though it had been over a decade since his silver and bronze wins for fencing in the Third Central American Games, in 1946 he was crowned the Central American foil holder in Barranquilla, Colombia. He qualified for the 1948 Summer Olympics in London and took seventh place in his elimination series. In the 1950 VI Central American and Caribbean Games in Guatemala he won silver in individual foil and gold in team foil as well as fourth place in individual saber. In February and March 1951 he obtained what would be his last regional fencing medals: a silver medal in team foil and bronze medal in team épée at the first Pan American Sports Games held in Buenos Aires, Argentina.

Alongside his fencing career, Agostini also practiced competitive pistol shooting. He was a frequent champion for Cuba in caliber 22, 38 and 45 shooting. He also was part of the National Team in the World Shooting Championship in Los Angeles, California, in September 1951, and represented Cuba in several competitions in North America, including Mexico, Panama, Puerto Rico and mainland United States.

On 9 March 1952 he arrived in Key West, Florida, with his wife, Enma Surí Ramírez, another accomplished athlete, for a pistol shooting competition. The following day Fulgencio Batista's military coup of 10 March occurred, reinstating him as Cuba's president and dictator. Agostini was informed by phone and immediately sent his resignation to his positions. On 29 March he was arrested at the dock in Havana by members of the Servicio de Inteligencia Naval - Naval Intelligence Service - (SIN) where he would be held for several days.

== Insurrection activities ==
Immediately following his 1952 release from custody, Agostini began his insurrectionary activities against the second Batista dictatorship, as he had previously against the first regime. He covertly established contacts with soldiers and officers who had been discharged from the armed forces (navy, army) and police by Batista's allies and accomplices.

Agostini's established international reputation and prestige led him to be accepted by many leading figures from other organizations, mainly from the Orthodox Party. These prominent figures and supporters included: Pelayo Cuervo Navarro and the prominent psychiatrist F. René de la Huerta in Havana, José Manuel Gutiérrez in Matanzas, the former Orthodox Party candidate for Mayor of Santa Clara Santiago Riera, as well as the Orthodox leader of Marianao, Juan Manuel Márquez.

In June 1954 Juan Manuel was arrested and interrogated by Batista's forces regarding Agostini's whereabouts and activities. Once released, Juan Manuel informs Agostini. The house where Agostini was hiding is then raided, however he had time to hide inside a water tank on the roof and later jumped over several rooftops to reach the Nuestra Señora de Lourdes clinic in Vedado where the administrator, a contact of de la Huerta, assisted him. Disguised in a doctor's gown, Agostini escaped in an ambulance.

Agostini then became an asylee in the Mexican Embassy and arranges to go into exile in Mexico. On 22 August, he then went to the United States, and coordinated with contacts in the US and in Mexico to attempt to join any potential expedition to Cuba, though none materialized. He returned to Miami and then Cuba at the end of December 1954 and began strengthening his insurrection network to include Authentic Party leader Menelao Mora Morales and several significant Navy contacts including Santiago Ríos and Lieutenants Dionisio San Román, Juan M. Castiñeiras, Felipe Vidal and other officers. In May 1955 he had continued to be in hiding and conducting covert activities, now waiting to hear from former President Carlos Prío and what the other exiled hierarchy of insurrectionary Authentic Party would decide to do.

== Death ==
On 9 June 1955, Agostini was at the home of Dr. René de la Huerta, a leading member of the influential Agrupación Católica Universitaria, in Vedado holding a secret meeting with other insurrection leaders Menelao Mora, Lomberto Díaz, and the Orthodox Party jurist Pelayo Cuervo Navarro. At approximately eight o'clock in the evening Pelayo Cuervo Navarro approached de la Huerta's home in his car and saw armed police surrounding the home, causing him to avoid the area and give them notice by phone. Inside the house, Agostini was dining with de la Huerta and his family until he became aware of the situation outside the residence. As he had done in the previous 1954 raid, he quickly grabbed one of de la Huerta's medical gowns and a doctor's bag where he hid a gun. Agostini leapt over the back wall of de la Huerta's home and entered the back of the nearby Anglo-American Clinic but was surrounded and captured by the National Police Investigations Bureau.

While he was held in detention, an argument ensued between the head of the National Police Investigations Bureau, Colonel Orlando Piedra, and the head of the Naval Intelligence Service, Julio S. Laurent over which respective body held jurisdiction over the handling of Agostini. Laurent demanded that Agostini be turned over to him, claiming superior orders. Without waiting for an answer Laurent went to a car and pulled Agostini out. He resisted and Laurent struck him in the face with the end of his submachine gun, causing Agostini to fall and break his right cheekbone. Laurent and Sergeant Heriberto Izquierdo then executed him. Forensic autopsy reports documented twenty-three perforations for close-range shots of less than one meter.

=== Response ===
Agostini's death sparked public outrage against the Batista regime and was a significant escalation in mobilizing the Batista opposition. The event was widely reported by national Cuban newspapers, including extensive coverage from the widely circulated La Calle for several days following the news.

With the mounting press coverage and social responses, Agostini's burial on Saturday 11 June would become a political event. It was headed by the leaders of the FEU along with dozens of militants from the Civic Front of Marti Women. Many participants in attendance sang the National Anthem at his grave at the time of burial.

Rising revolutionary leader Fidel Castro, then a young lawyer who was recently released from incarceration, seized on the event to make the case against Batista's regime to the public. He penned an article titled "Frente al terror y frente al crimen" ("Facing Terror and Facing Crime") that was published on 11 June. In it he wrote "Jorge Agostini was assassinated, there is no doubt." He went on to call the act "monstrous political assassination" and described Agostini as "the new martyr of the struggle for national liberation." After making his case against Batista, Castro closed by calling for national mobilization in favor of his own Revolution as "the only correct tactic."

Other anti-Batista figures would also speak out in the aftermath of Agostini's death, including José Antonio Echeverría and René Anillo, both leaders of the Directorio Revolucionario Estudiantil (DRE). Several Batista opposition parties in the Cuban Congress also denounced the killing with the Parliamentary Committee of the Authentic Party addressing a letter to the Prosecutor of the Supreme Court of Justice in which they demanded the broadest possible impartial investigation of what occurred.

Agostini's widow, Emma Surí, initiated a legal case where she presented a private accusation to the Emergency Court of Havana. This resulted in the ordered the release of Dr. Huerta and two others who has been accused by the police, but the court refused to hear the case against the government bodies accused in his killing and passed them to the Investigating Court of the Fourth Section, where Judge Waldo Bacallo initiated a case in which Julio Laurent was listed as the main defendant in the murder of Agostini. Manuel Antonio Varona Loredo, President of the Authentic Party, assumed the representation of Agostini's widow and acted as prosecutor in the summary. After several months, shortly before concluding the investigation of the case to determined the guilt of Laurent and Heriberto Izquierdo, the magistrates of the Supreme Court of Justice abruptly invalidated the civilian capacity to continue hearing the case and transferred it to the military jurisdiction, where it was quickly dismissed.

== Personal life ==
Jorge Agostini was married to fellow Cuban athlete Enma Gloria Surís Ramírez.

They had two children, Rodolfo Jorge and María Teresa and he also had a daughter, Sonia Agostini Fuentes, from a previous marriage.
