= Massialas =

Massialas is a surname. Notable people with the surname include:

- Alexander Massialas (born 1994), American fencer and coach
- Greg Massialas (born 1956), American fencer and coach, father of Alexander
