= Nathaniel Lubell =

American fencer (1916–1966)

Personal information
- Full name: Bennet Nathaniel Lubell
- Born: August 15, 1916 New York City, U.S.
- Died: September 17, 2006 (aged 90) Fort Lee, New Jersey, U.S.

Sport
- Country: United States
- Sport: Fencing
- Event(s): foil, saber, and epee
- College team: City College of New York
- Club: Fencers Club
Medal record
Men's fencing
Representing United States
Pan American Games
| Gold medal – first place | 1951 Buenos Aires | Team foil |
| Gold medal – first place | 1951 Buenos Aires | Team sabre |
| Silver medal – second place | 1951 Buenos Aires | Team épée |
| Bronze medal – third place | 1951 Buenos Aires | Individual foil |

Bennet Nathaniel Lubell (August 15, 1916 – September 17, 2006) was an American three-time Olympian fencer.

== Early and personal life ==
Lubell was born in New York City, and was Jewish. Later in life he lived in Fort Lee, New Jersey.

== Fencing career ==
Lubell fenced for the City College of New York, graduating in 1936, and Lubell was inducted into the CCNY Athletic Hall of Fame in 1969.

He won the United States Foil Fencing Championship in 1948, fencing for the Fencers Club of New York. He also helped the Fencers Club win the team foil in 1949-51, 1953, and 1955-56 at the Amateur Fencers League of America (AFLA) Championships.

At the 1951 Pan American Games, Lubell won the bronze medal in individual foil, team gold medals in foil and saber, and the silver medal in team epee. The entire USA Foil Fencing Team at the 1956 Olympics was Jewish, with the other Jewish fencers being Daniel Bukantz, Albert Axelrod, Harold Goldsmith, and Byron Krieger.

Lubell competed for the United States in foil at the 1948 Summer Olympics in London, the 1952 Summer Olympics in Helsinki, and the 1956 Summer Olympics in Melbourne.

He coached fencing at West Point from 1962 until 1966. Lubell served as President of The New York Fencers Club during the 1970s.

== See also ==
- List of USFA Division I National Champions
- List of USFA Hall of Fame members
