= Félix Galimi =

Argentine fencer (1921–2005)

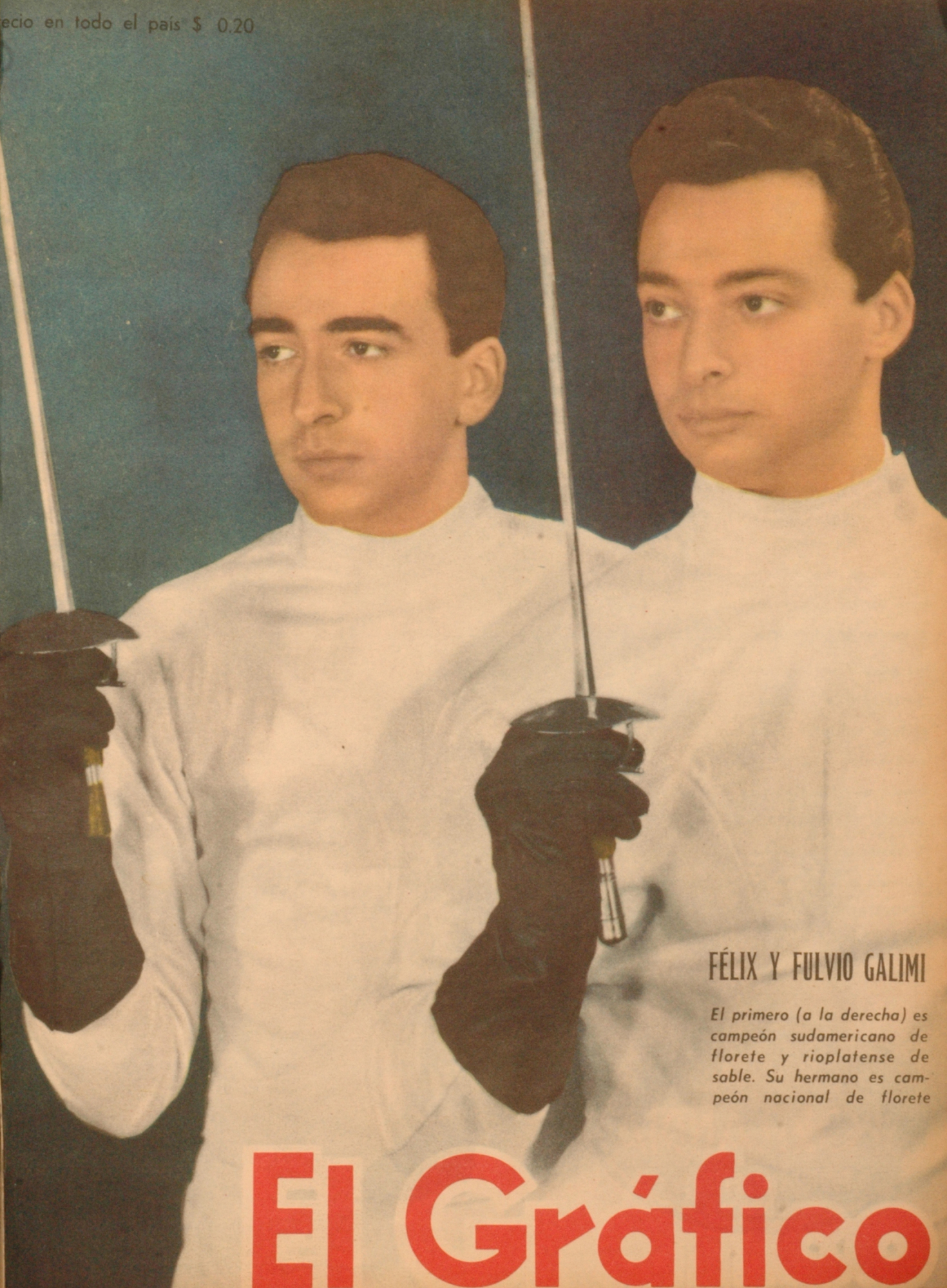
- Félix and Fulvio Galmi - El Gráfico, 1947

Personal information
- Full name: Félix Domingo Galimi Gherardi
- Born: 1 January 1921 Buenos Aires, Argentina
- Died: 2 January 2005 (aged 84) Buenos Aires, Argentina

Sport
- Sport: Fencing
Medal record
Men's fencing
Representing Argentina
Pan American Games
Gold medal – first place	1951 Buenos Aires	Individual foil
Silver medal – second place	1951 Buenos Aires	Team foil

Félix Domingo Galimi Gherardi (1 January 1921 – 2 January 2005) was an Argentine fencer. He competed at the 1948, 1952 and 1964 Summer Olympics.
