= Estevão Molnar =

Brazilian fencer

Personal information
- Born: 26 August 1915 Miskolc, Austria-Hungary (now in Hungary)
- Died: 10 January 1992 (aged 76)

Sport
- Sport: Fencing
Medal record
Men's fencing
Representing Brazil
Pan American Games
Bronze medal – third place	1951 Buenos Aires	Team sabre

Estevão Molnar (26 August 1915 – 10 January 1992) was a Brazilian fencer. He competed in the individual sabre events at the 1948 and 1952 Summer Olympics.
