= Huergo =

Huergo is a surname. Notable people with the surname include:

- Fernando Huergo (1908–1995), Argentine fencer
- Luis Huergo (1837–1913), Argentine engineer
