= Edward Vebell =

American fencer

Personal information
- Born: May 25, 1921 Chicago, Illinois, United States
- Died: February 9, 2018 (aged 96)
- Occupation: Illustrator

Sport
- Sport: Fencing
Medal record
Men's fencing
Representing United States
Pan American Games
Gold medal – first place	1951 Buenos Aires	Team foil
Silver medal – second place	1951 Buenos Aires	Team épée
Bronze medal – third place	1951 Buenos Aires	Individual épée

Edward T. Vebell (May 25, 1921 – February 9, 2018) was an American fencer and illustrator.

== Early life ==
Vebell was born in Chicago, to Lithuanian parents. He attended art school from the age of fourteen.

== Sport ==
Vebell competed in the individual (semi-finalist) and team épée events at the 1952 Summer Olympics. Vebell was elected to the US Fencing Hall of Fame in April 2014.

== Illustrator ==
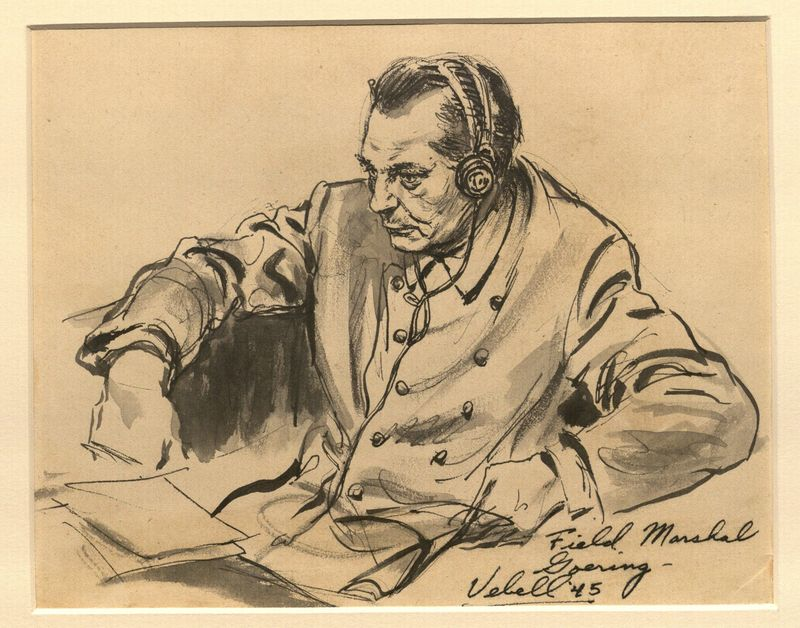
Field Marshal Goering, Nuremberg War Crimes Trials, 1945; original now in the United States Holocaust Memorial Museum

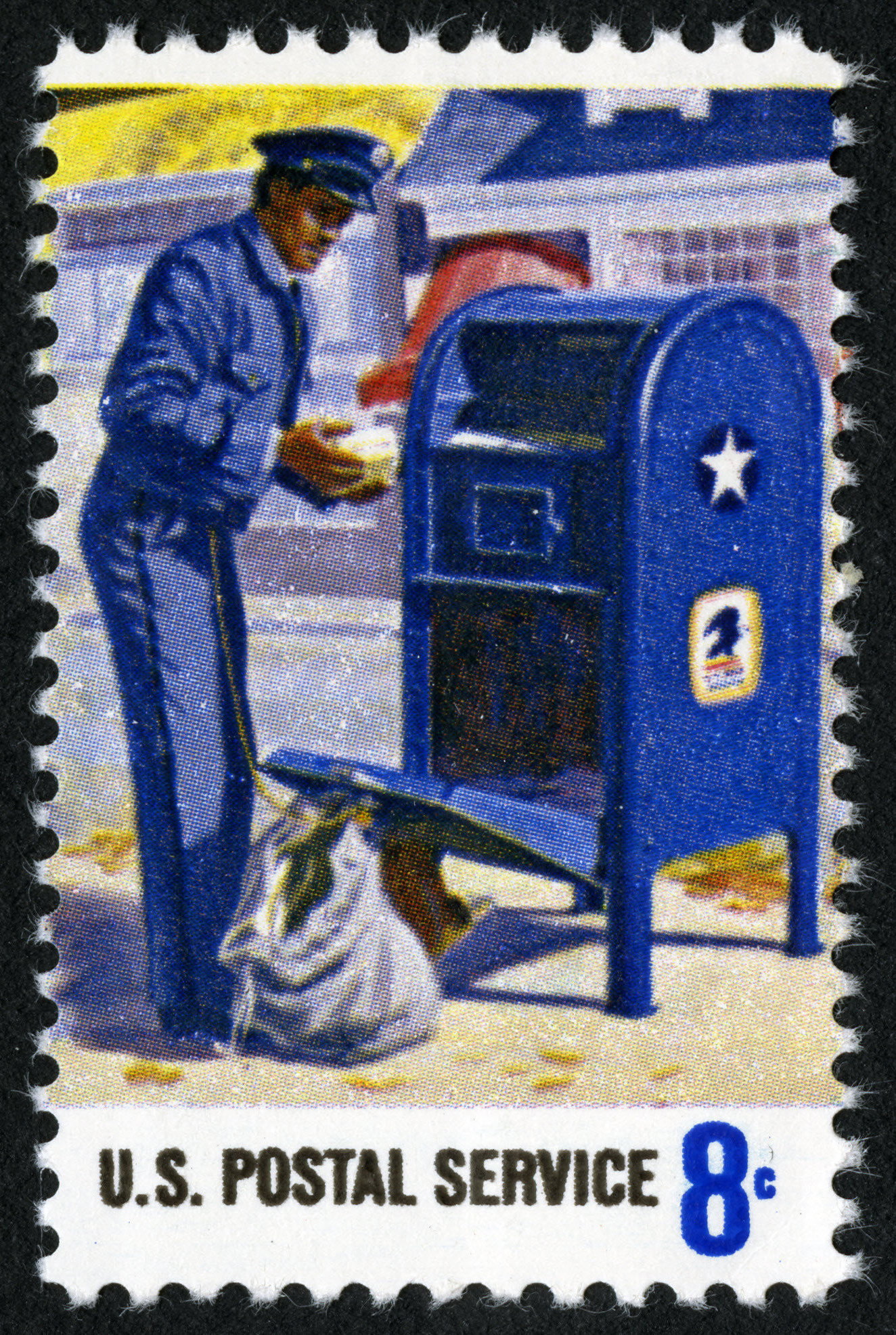
Mail Collection, 1973 postage stamp designed by Vebell

After working as an illustrator in Chicago, Vebell enlisted in the United States Army during World War II. He became a staff artist for Stars & Stripes. Vebell later headed the Anzio, Italy Stars & Stripes office, where he worked with Bill Mauldin and Gregor Duncan. Vebell claimed that he was the one who convinced Mauldin to switch from a pen to a brush for his WWII cartoons. Vebell was an official courtroom artist for the Nuremberg war trials, often having to view and drawing the courtroom scenes through binoculars, because it was so crowded. Many of his Nuremberg works are now in the United States Holocaust Memorial Museum.

As a professional illustrator and artist, his commissions include work for the United States Postal Service. He also executed commissions for many periodicals, including a long run as Reader's Digest's most popular illustrator.

== Later life ==
After the war, he moved to Westport with his wife, Elsa Cerra. They had three daughters.

In February 2018 he was honored by the Westport Historical Society with an autobiographical exhibit that paid homage to his career and achievements.

He died on February 9, 2018, aged 96.

== Works ==
- Ed, Vebell (2017). An Artist at War, the WWII Memories of Stars & Stripes Artist Ed Vebell. Schiffer Publishing. ISBN 978-0764353147.

== See also ==
- List of USFA Hall of Fame members
