= Frank Anger =

American fencer

Personal information
- Full name: Frank David Anger
- Born: September 24, 1939 Chicago, Illinois, U.S.
- Died: July 8, 2004 (aged 64) Alpine Junction, Wyoming, U.S.
- Height: 6 ft 3 in (191 cm)
- Weight: 170 lb (77 kg)

Sport
- Sport: Fencing
Medal record
Men's fencing
Representing the United States
Pan American Games
Gold medal – first place	1963 São Paulo	Epée individual
Gold medal – first place	1963 São Paulo	Epée team
Silver medal – second place	1967 Winnipeg	Epée individual
Gold medal – first place	1967 Winnipeg	Epée team

Frank David Anger (September 24, 1939 – July 8, 2004) was an American fencer. He competed in the individual and team épée events at the 1964 Summer Olympics.

== See also ==
- List of Princeton University Olympians
