= Elsa Irigoyen =

Argentine fencer (1919–2001)

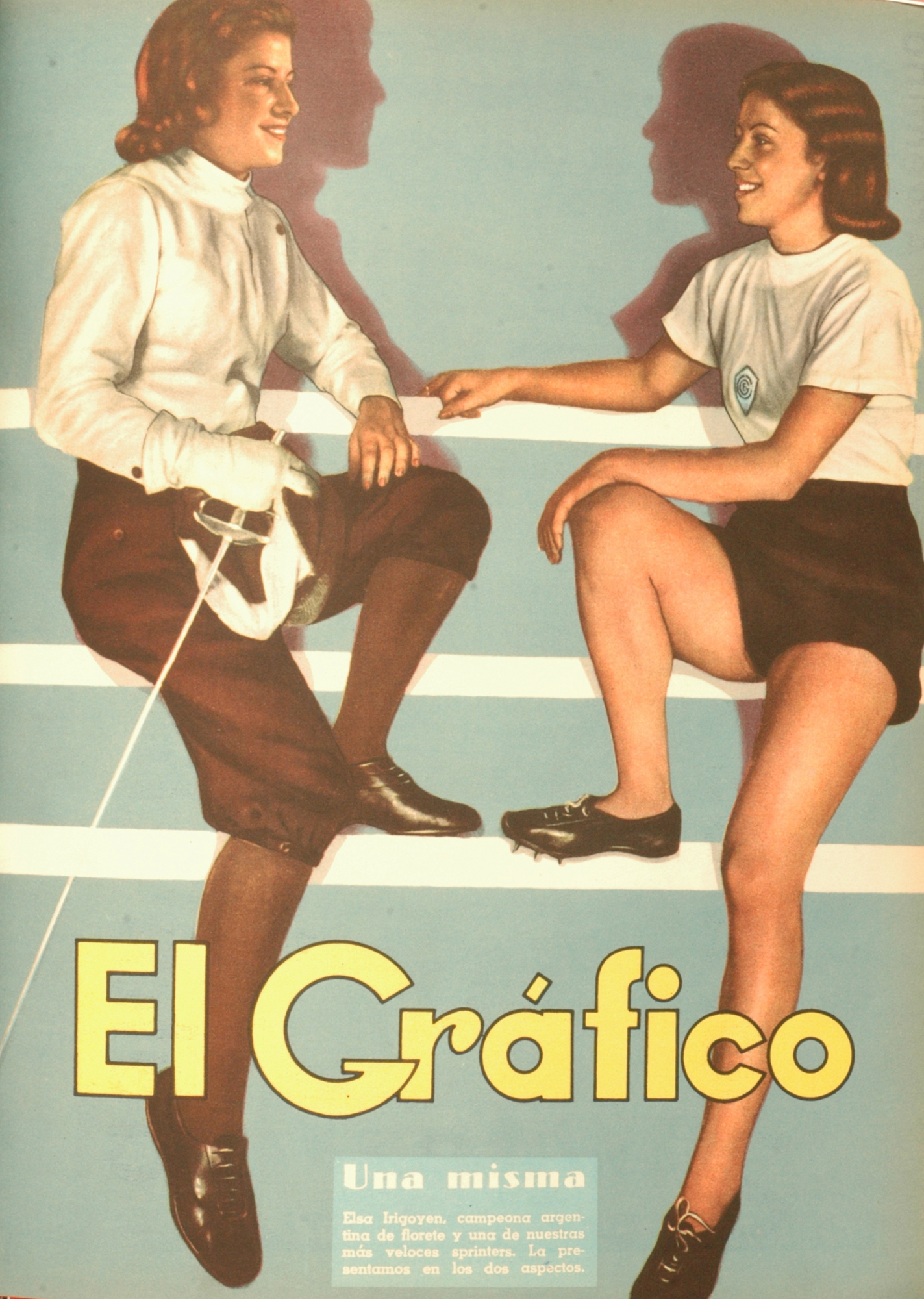
- Elsa Irigoyen in El Gráfico, in 1939.jpg

Personal information
- Full name: Elsa Lidia Irigoyen Gombauch
- Born: 18 May 1919 Buenos Aires, Argentina
- Died: 5 February 2001 (aged 81) Buenos Aires, Argentina

Sport
- Sport: Fencing
Medal record
Women's fencing
Representing Argentina
Pan American Games
Gold medal – first place	1951 Buenos Aires	Individual foil

Elsa Lidia Irigoyen Gombauch (18 May 1919 – 5 February 2001) was an Argentine fencer. She competed in the women's individual foil event at the 1948 and 1952 Summer Olympics.
