= Tibor Nyilas =

American fencer (1914–1986)

Personal information
- Born: June 3, 1914 Budapest, Hungary
- Died: May 19, 1986 (aged 71) New York City, U.S.

Sport
- Sport: Fencing
Medal record
Men's fencing
Representing United States
Olympic Games
Bronze medal – third place	1948 London	Team sabre
Pan American Games
Gold medal – first place	1951 Buenos Aires	Individual sabre
Gold medal – first place	1951 Buenos Aires	Team foil
Gold medal – first place	1951 Buenos Aires	Team sabre

Tibor Nyilas (June 3, 1914 – May 19, 1986) was an American fencer. He won a bronze medal in the team sabre event at the 1948 Summer Olympics.

== See also ==
- List of USFA Division I National Champions
