= Benito Ramos (fencer) =

Mexican fencer

Personal information
- Full name: Benito Ramos Ramos
- Born: 26 March 1913 Guadalajara, Jalisco, Mexico

Sport
- Sport: Fencing
Medal record
Men's fencing
Representing Mexico
Pan American Games
Silver medal – second place	1951 Buenos Aires	Individual épée

Benito Ramos Ramos (born 26 March 1913, date of death unknown) was a Mexican épée, foil and sabre fencer. He competed at the 1948, 1952, 1956 and 1960 Summer Olympics.
