= Miguel de Capriles =

American fencer (1906–1981)

Personal information
- Born: November 30, 1906 Mexico City, Mexico
- Died: May 24, 1981 (aged 74) San Francisco, California, U.S.

Sport
- Sport: Fencing
Medal record
Men's fencing
Representing United States
Olympic Games
| Bronze medal – third place | 1932 Los Angeles | Team épée |
| Bronze medal – third place | 1948 London | Team sabre |
Pan American Games
| Gold medal – first place | 1951 Buenos Aires | Team foil |
| Gold medal – first place | 1951 Buenos Aires | Team sabre |
| Silver medal – second place | 1951 Buenos Aires | Team épée |

Miguel de Capriles (November 30, 1906 – May 24, 1981) was a Mexican-born American fencer, a President of the FIE, a former dean of the New York University School of Law and one of the world's leading authorities on fencing.

== Biography ==
De Capriles was a member of every United States Olympic and international fencing team from 1932 to 1951 and president of the World Fencing Federation. He won a bronze medal in the team épée event at the 1932 Summer Olympics and a bronze in the team sabre at the 1948 Summer Olympics. He won the national three-weapon championship five times and the national open épée championship four times, and was a member of the Olympic épée team that placed third in Los Angeles in 1932 and third in London in 1948 — both the best showing of an American fencing team in the Olympics at the time.

He was also an attorney with a distinguished career as a professor of law, writing dozens of articles on corporate law. He served as dean and later vice president and general counsel of New York University. After leaving N.Y.U. in 1974, he became a professor of law at the University of California, Hastings College of the Law in San Francisco, where he taught classes relating to business law, such as accounting for lawyers and corporations.

De Capriles was born in Mexico and came to the United States at the age of 13, with no knowledge of English or fencing. He attended the Irving School in Tarrytown, and then N.Y.U., from which he graduated cum laude in 1927. He joined the school's staff in 1929 and earned a master's degree in 1932, followed by a Doctorate in Jurisprudence in 1935.

After serving in World War II as a special assistant in the Justice Department, he returned to N.Y.U. as an associate law professor. In 1947, he became the founding director of the university's Inter-American Law Institute. The following year he was named associate dean of the Law School and became dean in 1964.

In 1967, he was appointed vice president and general counsel of the university, and during campus disorders in 1969, he went to court to obtain a permanent injunction forbidding violence on its grounds by radical groups. The next year, N.Y.U. won a lawsuit in which a student sought a tuition refund for 19 days of classes canceled during campus uprising in response to the deployment of United States forces in Cambodia.

He was married to the former Dorothy Hafner and had a son, Thomas, as well as a daughter, Christina Munz.

== See also ==
- List of USFA Division I National Champions
