= Marie-Françoise Hervieu =

Canadian fencer (born 1972)

Personal information
- Born: 20 January 1972 (age 54) Quebec City, Quebec, Canada

Sport
- Sport: Fencing
Medal record
Representing Canada
Pan American Games
Bronze medal – third place	1995 Mar del Plata	Team épée

Marie-Françoise Hervieu (born 20 January 1972) is a Canadian fencer. She competed in the women's team foil event at the 1992 Summer Olympics.
