= Antonio Villamil =

Argentine fencer

Personal information
- Full name: Antonio Wenceslao Villamil Ramognino
- Born: 8 October 1904 Buenos Aires, Argentina

Sport
- Sport: Fencing
Medal record
Men's fencing
Representing Argentina
Pan American Games
Gold medal – first place	1951 Buenos Aires	Individual épée
Gold medal – first place	1951 Buenos Aires	Team épée

Antonio Wenceslao Villamil Ramognino (born 8 October 1904, date of death unknown) was an Argentine fencer. He competed at the 1928, 1936 and 1948 Summer Olympics.
