= Evens Gravel =

Canadian fencer (born 1970)

Personal information
- Born: 23 October 1970 (age 55) Chibougamau, Quebec, Canada

Sport
- Sport: Fencing
Medal record
Representing Canada
Pan American Games
Gold medal – first place	1991 Havana	Team sabre
Bronze medal – third place	1999 Winnipeg	Team sabre

Evens Gravel (born 23 October 1970) is a Canadian fencer. He competed in the team sabre event at the 1992 and 1996 Summer Olympics.
