= Mirayda García =

Cuban fencer (born 1969)

Personal information
- Born: 9 February 1969 (age 57) Havana, Cuba

Sport
- Sport: Fencing
Medal record
Representing Cuba
World Championships
Gold medal – first place	1997 Cape Town	Individual épée
Silver medal – second place	1998 La Chaux-de-Fonds	Team épée
Bronze medal – third place	1999 Seoul	Individual épée
Pan American Games
Gold medal – first place	1999 Winnipeg	Individual épée
Gold medal – first place	1999 Winnipeg	Team épée
Silver medal – second place	1991 Havana	Team foil
Silver medal – second place	1995 Mar del Plata	Team épée

Mirayda García Soto (born 9 February 1969) is a Cuban fencer. She competed in the women's individual and team épée events at the 1996 and 2000 Summer Olympics.
