= Fencing at the 1991 Pan American Games =

Fencing at the 1991 Pan American Games took place in Havana, Cuba. Fencers from host country Cuba and Canada were expected to provide stiff competition for top fencers from the United States.

== Men's events ==
Event	Gold	Silver	Bronze
Individual épée	Lázaro Castro; Cuba	Jon Normile; United States	Danek Nowosielski; Canada; Juan Miguel Paz; Colombia
Team épée	Cuba; Camilo Aguilera; Lázaro Castro; Iván Trevejo; Carlos Barrientos; Mario de la Rosa	Colombia; Juan Miguel Paz; Mauricio Rivas; Oscar Arango; Nelson Ruiz; William González	United States; Jim Carpenter; Robert Marx; Jon Normile; Chris O'Loughlin; Joseph Socolof
Individual foil	Guillermo Betancourt; Cuba	Elvis Gregory; Cuba	Nick Bravin; United States; Nicolas Bergeron; Canada
Team foil	Cuba; Guillermo Betancourt; Elvis Gregory; Tomás Díaz; Oscar García; Rolando Tucker	United States; Nick Bravin; Jerome Demarque; Dean Hinton; Jack Tichachek	Canada; Nicolas Bergeron; Benoît Giasson; Danek Nowosielski; Jean-François Pinel; Nicolas Chouinard
Individual sabre	Steve Mormando; United States	Alexis Leyva; Cuba	Mike Lofton; United States; Jean-Marie Banos; Canada
Team sabre	Cuba; Andrés Leiva; Bernardo Pérez; Pedro Cabezas; Agustín García; Armando Fabre	United States; John Friedberg; Mike Lofton; Steve Mormando; David Stollman; Peter Westbrook	Canada; Jean-Marie Banos; Jean-Paul Banos; Bruno Deschênes; Evens Gravel; Tony Plourde

== Women's events ==
Event	Gold	Silver	Bronze
Individual épée	Taymi Chappé; Cuba	Angélina Dueñas; Mexico	Yolitzin Martínez; Mexico; Sandra Giancola; Argentina
Team épée	United States; Elaine Cheris; Laurel Clark-Skillman; Cathy McClellan; Margo Miller; Donna Stone	Cuba; Taymi Chappé; Yarmila Figueroa; Ileana Duarte; María Pérez; Dianicelis Marín	Mexico; Angélina Dueñas; Yolitzin Martínez; Josefa Zapata; María García; Lourdes Roldán
Individual foil	Caridad Estrada; Cuba	Sandra Giancola; Argentina	Caitlin Bilodeaux; United States; Bárbara Hernandez; Cuba
Team foil	United States; Caitlin Bilodeaux; Sharon Monplaisir; Jane Hall; Ann Marsh; Molly Sullivan	Cuba; Célia Estrada; Beatríz Hernández; Mailía Acuña; Mirayda García; Migsey Dussu	Argentina; Sandra Giancola; Andrea Chiuchich; Yanina Iannuzzi; María Laura Lede

== Medal table ==
Rank	Nation	Gold medal	Silver medal	Bronze medal	Total
1	Cuba	7	4	1	12
2	United States	3	3	4	10
3	Argentina	0	1	2	3
4	Mexico	0	1	2	3
5	Colombia	0	1	1	2
6	Canada	0	0	5	5
6	Total	10	10	15	35
