= José Rodríguez (fencer) =

Argentine fencer

Personal information
- Full name: José María Rodríguez Roches
- Born: 19 March 1910

Sport
- Sport: Fencing
Medal record
Men's fencing
Representing Argentina
Pan American Games
Silver medal – second place	1951 Buenos Aires	Individual foil
Silver medal – second place	1951 Buenos Aires	Team foil

José María Rodríguez Roches (born 19 March 1910, date of death unknown) was an Argentine foil fencer. He competed at the 1948 and 1952 Summer Olympics.
