= Irma de Antequeda =

Argentine fencer (1920–2005)

Personal information
- Full name: Irma Nelly de Antequeda Orlando
- Born: 15 October 1920 Buenos Aires, Argentina
- Died: 14 January 2005 (aged 84)

Sport
- Country: Argentina
- Sport: Fencing
Medal record
Women's fencing
Representing Argentina
Pan American Games
Silver medal – second place	1951 Buenos Aires	Individual foil

Irma Nelly de Antequeda Orlando (Note: In this Spanish name, the first or paternal surname is Antequeda and the second or maternal family name is Orlando.) (15 October 1920 – 14 January 2005) was an Argentine fencer. She competed in the women's individual foil event at the 1948 Summer Olympics.
