= Zaddick Longenbach =

American fencer

Personal information
- Full name: Zaddick Xavier Longenbach
- Born: October 27, 1971 (age 54) Greenawalds, Pennsylvania, U.S.

Sport
- Country: USA
- Sport: Fencing
- Club: Salle Santelli
Medal record
Representing United States
Pan American Games
Silver medal – second place	1995 Mar del Plata	Team foil
Silver medal – second place	1999 Winnipeg	Team foil
Bronze medal – third place	1999 Winnipeg	Individual foil

Zaddick Xavier Longenbach (born October 27, 1971) is an American fencer. He competed in the individual foil event at the 1992 Summer Olympics. He later became an art collector.
