= Román Quinos =

Argentine fencer (born 1940)

Personal information
- Born: 23 July 1940 (age 85) Buenos Aires, Argentina

Sport
- Sport: Fencing

Román Quinos (born 23 July 1940) is an Argentine fencer. He competed in the individual and team sabre events at the 1968 Summer Olympics.
