= Allan Kwartler =

American fencer (1917–1998)

Personal information
- Full name: Allan S. Kwartler
- Nickname: Doc
- Born: September 10, 1917 New York, New York, United States
- Died: November 11, 1998 (aged 81) Mount Vernon, New York, United States

Sport
- Sport: Fencing
- College team: Wayne State University
- Club: Salle Santelli
- Coached by: Giorgio Santelli
Medal record
Men's fencing
Representing United States
Pan American Games
| Gold medal – first place | 1955 Mexico City | Team sabre |
| Gold medal – first place | 1959 Chicago | Individual sabre |
| Gold medal – first place | 1959 Chicago | Team sabre |
| Silver medal – second place | 1955 Mexico City | Team foil |
Maccabiah Games
| Gold medal – first place | 1950 Israel | Individual Sabre |
| Gold medal – first place | 1953 Israel | Individual Foil |

Allan S. Kwartler (nicknamed "Doc"; September 10, 1917 – November 11, 1998), born in New York City, was an American sabre and foil fencer. He was Pan-American sabre champion, 3-time Olympian, and twice a member of sabre teams that earned 4th-place in Olympic Games (1952, 1960).

== Early and personal life ==
He was born in New York City, later lived in Yonkers, New York, and was Jewish. He attended Benjamin Franklin Junior High School and Morris High School in the Bronx.

He had careers in advertising sales and insurance underwriting. In 1958 he moved to Yonkers, New York.

== Fencing career ==
Kwartler began fencing at Wayne State University under Bela de Tuscan at age 28. In 1946 he transferred to and continued fencing at Michigan State University under Charles Schmitter, while he earned a Bachelor of Science degree in 1948 in bacteriology.

He returned to New York City in 1948, when he joined Salle Santelli, where he studied sabre under Maestro Giorgio Santelli, the Olympic fencing coach, and foil under Professor Edward F. Lucia.

He was the United States' most consistent 2-weapon fencer in the 1950s and 1960s, a several-times US National Championships finalist, in saber and foil. In 1948 he won second place in the Midwest sectionals in sabre, the first undergraduate to earn a medal in Midwest Championships.

In 1953 he was second in foil in the National Championships; in 1954 he was second in saber and fourth in foil; in 1956 and 1960 he placed second in saber; and in 1959 third in sabre. He was nationally ranked 17 times in either foil or saber between 1951 and 1965, and was a member of 10 US national championship teams.

=== Olympics ===
Kwartler fenced in the Olympics in 1952, 1956, and 1960. He was a member of the sabre team that placed fourth in 1956, and in individual saber he made the semi-finals that same year. In 1960 he was on the fourth place Olympic sabre team.

=== Pan American Games and Martini-Rossi ===
His best international success was winning the 1959 Pan American Games individual sabre title in Chicago. He also won saber team gold medals at the 1955 and 1959 Pan Am Games. He was a silver medalist in team foil and individual foil finalist (5th place) at the 1955 Pan American Games.

Kwartler also was a finalist in the first Martini-Rossi world cup sabre event (1961).

=== Maccabiah Games ===
In 1950 and 1953 Kwartler, who was Jewish, was selected for the Maccabiah Games in Israel, winning the sabre championship in the 1950 Maccabiah Games (while losing in the foil gold medal bout to teammate Daniel Bukantz 5–4), and the foil in 1953 Maccabiah Games.

=== Veteran fencing ===
Kwartler was the veterans champion in sabre several times at the Empire State Games.

== Official and Fencing Association ==
He was a widely respected official, and presided at the individual sabre finals in the 1960 Summer Olympics in Rome.

Kwartler was chairman of the Amateur Fencers League of America's (AFLA) (predecessor to the current United States Fencing Association (USFA)) Metropolitan Division (1958–60) and AFLA national secretary (1960–63). He remained active in the affairs of the Westchester Division of the USFA and the Empire State Games.

== Coaching ==
Kwartler was also a widely respected coach, who coached in the methods of the Italian School for sabre, foil, and épée fencing. He coached at Salle Santelli, Brooklyn Poly (1965–80),"Archived copy" (PDF). Archived from the original on 2003-05-19. SUNY (Purchase), the US Military Academy at West Point, Rockland Center for the Arts, and the Westchester Fencing Club. He was named USFCA coach of the year in the Middle Atlantic Collegiate Fencing Association in 1994.

== Halls of Fame ==
In 1953 he was the first fencer to be elected to Michigan State University's Hall of Fame, and in 1979 he was inducted into the Fencer's Hall of Fame in Los Angeles, formerly known as the Helms Foundation Hall of Olympic Fame. He was also inducted into the Yonkers Hall of Fame in 1980, the Westchester Sports Hall of Fame in 1991, and the USFA Hall of Fame in 2001.

== Death ==
Kwartler died on November 11, 1998, and was survived by his wife, Connie, his son and two daughters, and four grandchildren.

== See also ==
- List of select Jewish fencers
- List of USFA Hall of Fame members
