= Elaine Cheris =

American fencer (1946–2026)

Personal information
- Full name: Elaine Gayle Cheris
- Born: January 8, 1946 Dothan, Alabama, U.S.
- Died: August 19, 2026 (aged 80) Denver, Colorado, U.S.
- Height: 5 ft 7.5 in (171.5 cm)
- Weight: 121 lb (55 kg)

Sport
- Country: USA
- Sport: Fencing
- Events: Foil and epee
Medal record
Representing United States
Pan American Games
Gold medal – first place	1987 Indianapolis	Team foil
Gold medal – first place	1991 Havana	Team épée

Elaine Gayle Cheris (January 8, 1946 – August 19, 2026) was an American Olympic foil and épée fencer.

== Background ==
Cheris was born in Dothan, Alabama, on January 8, 1946, and was Jewish. She earned a BS in Physical Education and Sports Psychology at Troy University, where she competed on the men's track team, in 1971. She married Sam David Cheris, a lawyer, in 1980.

Cheris died on August 19, 2026, at the age of 80.

== Fencing career ==
Cheris began fencing at 29 years of age. She was working at the time as the assistant athletic director at a Jewish Community Center in New Haven, Connecticut, where she put together a fencing program and decided to try the sport. In 1979 she quit her job to train for the Olympic tryouts.

She qualified for the 1980 U.S. Olympic team, but did not compete due to the U.S. Olympic Committee's boycott of the 1980 Summer Olympics in Moscow, Russia. She was one of 461 athletes to receive a Congressional Gold Medal instead.

Cheris did compete for the United States in the 1988 Summer Olympics in Seoul in foil at the age of 42 (she was knocked out by Italian silver medalist Laura Chiesa, 15–13), and in the 1996 Summer Olympics in Atlanta in épée at the age of 50 (the second-oldest female US Olympic fencer ever, after Maxine Mitchell). Cheris was an alternate in the 2000 Summer Olympics in Sydney, having missed making the team by one touch.

She won an individual silver medal and a team gold medal at the 1981 Maccabiah Games. At the end of the 1985 season, she was the number 1 US female foil fencer at age 39. She won a gold medal in team foil at the 1987 Pan American Games, and a gold medal in team épée at the 1991 Pan American Games.

Cheris was inducted into the Colorado Sports Hall of Fame in 1983. In 1993, the Fédération Internationale d'Escrime awarded her its Gold Medal of Honor.

She founded the fencing club the Cheyenne Fencing Society and Modern Pentathlon Center of Denver in Denver, Colorado. Cheris has authored Fencing: Steps to Success (2002), which is a step-by-step teaching method.
