= Michel Boulos =

Canadian fencer (born 1976)

Personal information
- Born: March 24, 1976 (age 50) Montreal, Quebec, Canada

Sport
- Sport: Fencing
Medal record
Representing Canada
Pan American Games
Gold medal – first place	1999 Winnipeg	Team sabre
Silver medal – second place	2007 Rio de Janeiro	Team sabre
Bronze medal – third place	1999 Winnipeg	Individual sabre
Bronze medal – third place	2003 Santo Domingo	Individual sabre

Michel Boulos (born March 24, 1976) is a Canadian sabre fencer. He competed in the men's sabre event at the 2004 Summer Olympics. He was also part of the team that won gold in the sabre event at the 1999 Pan American Games, as well as winning silver at the 2007 Pan American Games, and two bronze medals.
