= Tony Plourde =

Canadian fencer (born 1966)

Personal information
- Born: 25 February 1966 (age 60) Chibougamau, Quebec, Canada

Sport
- Sport: Fencing
Medal record
Representing Canada
Pan American Games
Bronze medal – third place	1991 Havana	Team sabre
Bronze medal – third place	1995 Mar del Plata	Team sabre

Tony Plourde (born 25 February 1966) is a Canadian fencer. He competed in the sabre events at the 1988, 1992 and 1996 Summer Olympics.
