= Orlando Nannini =

Argentine fencer (born 1937)

Personal information
- Born: 12 July 1937 (age 88) Buenos Aires, Argentina

Sport
- Sport: Fencing

Orlando Nannini (born 12 July 1937) is an Argentine fencer. He competed in the individual and team foil events at the 1964 and 1968 Summer Olympics.
