= Migsey Dussu =

Cuban fencer (born 1972)

Personal information
- Born: 25 January 1972 (age 54)

Sport
- Sport: Fencing
Medal record
Representing Cuba
Pan American Games
Gold medal – first place	1995 Mar del Plata	Team foil
Gold medal – first place	1999 Winnipeg	Individual foil
Gold medal – first place	1999 Winnipeg	Team foil
Silver medal – second place	1991 Havana	Team foil
Central American and Caribbean Games
Gold medal – first place	1993 Ponce	Team foil
Gold medal – first place	1998 Maracaibo	Individual foil
Gold medal – first place	1998 Maracaibo	Team foil
Silver medal – second place	1993 Ponce	Individual foil

Migsey Dussu Armiñan (born 25 January 1972) is a Cuban fencer. She competed in the women's individual foil event at the 2000 Summer Olympics.
