= Nelson Nieves =

Venezuelan fencer (1934–2021)

Personal information
- Born: 24 December 1934
- Died: 13 January 2021 (aged 86)

Sport
- Sport: Fencing

Nelson Nieves (24 December 1934 – 13 January 2021) was a Venezuelan fencer. He competed in the team foil events at the 1952 Summer Olympics.
