= Donna Stone (fencer) =

American competitive fencer

Personal information
- Born: January 17, 1957 (age 69) Englewood, New Jersey, United States

Sport
- Sport: Fencing
Medal record
Representing United States
Pan American Games
Gold medal – first place	1991 Havana	Team épée
Gold medal – first place	1995 Mar del Plata	Team épée

Donna Stone (born January 17, 1957) is an American athlete who is a former Olympian fencer and USA Fencing Hall of Fame member.

During her over 20 years competitive fencing carrier, Stone collected a World Championship 5th place, multiple Fencing World Cup medals, three US National Champion titles and two Pan American Women's Épée Team gold medals. She has fenced foil but became competitive in épée. She was inducted into the Fencing Hall of Fame in 2000. She is a coach at Rockland Fencers Club in New York State.

== See also ==
- List of USFA Hall of Fame members
