= Andrea Chiuchich =

Argentine fencer (born 1969)

Personal information
- Born: 24 April 1969 (age 57) Buenos Aires, Argentina

Sport
- Sport: Fencing
Medal record
Representing Argentina
Pan American Games
Bronze medal – third place	1991 Havana	Team foil

Andrea Chiuchich (born 24 April 1969) is an Argentine fencer. She competed in the women's individual foil event at the 1992 Summer Olympics.
