= Rolando Tucker =

Cuban fencer (born 1971)

Personal information
- Born: 31 December 1971 (age 54) Havana, Cuba

Sport
- Sport: Fencing
Medal record
Men's fencing
Representing Cuba
Olympic Games
Bronze medal – third place	1996 Atlanta	Team foil
World Championships
Gold medal – first place	1991 Budapest	Team foil
Gold medal – first place	1994 Athens	Individual foil
Gold medal – first place	1995 The Hague	Team foil
Silver medal – second place	1997 Cape Town	Team foil
Summer Universiade
Gold medal – first place	1993 Buffalo	Team foil
Gold medal – first place	1997 Catania	Individual foil
Gold medal – first place	1999 Palma de Mallorca	Individual foil
Gold medal – first place	1999 Palma de Mallorca	Team foil
Silver medal – second place	1997 Catania	Team foil
Pan American Games
Gold medal – first place	1991 Havana	Team foil
Gold medal – first place	1995 Mar del Plata	Team foil
Gold medal – first place	1999 Winnipeg	Individual foil
Gold medal – first place	1999 Winnipeg	Team foil
Silver medal – second place	1995 Mar del Plata	Individual foil
Central American and Caribbean Games
Gold medal – first place	1993 Ponce	Team foil
Gold medal – first place	1998 Maracaibo	Team foil
Silver medal – second place	1993 Ponce	Individual foil

Rolando Samuel Tucker León (born 31 December 1971) is a Cuban former fencer. He won a bronze medal in the team foil event at the 1996 Summer Olympics. He won the 1994 World Championships.
