= Jonathan Peña =

Puerto Rican fencer (born 1973)

Personal information
- Born: December 22, 1973 (age 52)

Sport
- Sport: Fencing
Medal record
Representing Puerto Rico
Pan American Games
Silver medal – second place	1999 Winnipeg	Individual épée
Bronze medal – third place	2003 Santo Domingo	Team épée

Jonathan Peña González (born December 22, 1973) is a Puerto Rican fencer. He competed in the individual épée event at the 2000 Summer Olympics.
