= Cándido Maya =

Cuban fencer (born 1973)

Personal information
- Born: 22 October 1973 (age 52) Pinar del Rio, Cuba

Sport
- Sport: Fencing
Medal record
Representing Cuba
Pan American Games
| Gold medal – first place | 1999 Winnipeg | Individual sabre |
| Silver medal – second place | 1999 Winnipeg | Team sabre |
| Bronze medal – third place | 2003 Santo Domingo | Team sabre |
Central American and Caribbean Games
| Gold medal – first place | 1993 Ponce | Team sabre |
| Gold medal – first place | 1998 Maracaibo | Team sabre |

Cándido Alberto Maya Camejo (born 22 October 1973) is a Cuban fencer. He competed in the individual sabre events at the 2000 and 2004 Summer Olympics.
