= Uriah Jones =

American fencer

Personal information
- Born: December 15, 1924 New York, New York, United States
- Died: June 14, 2000 (aged 75) West Haven, Connecticut, United States
- Height: 6 ft 0 in (183 cm)
- Weight: 201 lb (91 kg)

Sport
- Country: United States
- Sport: Fencing
- Club: Salle Santelli

Uriah Jones (December 15, 1924 – June 14, 2000) was an American fencer. He competed in the team foil event at the 1968 Summer Olympics.

== Career ==
In 1968, Jones became the first African-American fencer to represent the United States at the Olympics. He was also a member of the U.S. National, U.S. World, and U.S. Pan American championship teams. Jones competed for the Salle Santelli club, winning three titles in 1964, 1968, and 1972. Jones won several championships, winning six Connecticut championships, four North Atlantic championships, and two American championships. He also won medals on four occasions while competing in the international Martini and Rossi international tournament.

At the age of 50, Jones opened up his club in Connecticut. One of his most successful students, Elaine Cheris, became a two-time Olympian.

In 1999, Jones was elected to the US Fencing Association Hall of Fame and inducted posthumously.

== See also ==
- List of USFA Hall of Fame members
