= Lourdes Roldán =

Mexican fencer (born 1944)

Personal information
- Born: 27 June 1944 (age 82) Mexico City, Mexico

Sport
- Sport: Fencing
Medal record
Representing Mexico
Pan American Games
Bronze medal – third place	1991 Havana	Team épée
Central American and Caribbean Games
Silver medal – second place	1959 Caracas	Team foil
Silver medal – second place	1962 Kingston	Team foil
Silver medal – second place	1986 Santiago	Team foil
Silver medal – second place	1990 Mexico City	Team épée
Bronze medal – third place	1990 Mexico City	Team foil

Lourdes Roldán Reyna (born 27 June 1944) is a Mexican fencer. She competed in the women's individual and team foil events at the 1968 Summer Olympics.
