= Irene Forbes =

Cuban fencer (1949–2014)

Personal information
- Born: 3 April 1949
- Died: 14 June 2014 (aged 65)

Sport
- Country: Cuba
- Sport: Fencing

Irene Forbes (3 April 1949 – 14 June 2014) was a Cuban fencer. She competed in the women's team foil event at the 1972 Summer Olympics.
