= Jean-Paul Banos =

Canadian fencer (born 1961)

Personal information
- Full name: Jean-Paul Banos
- Nationality: Canadian
- Born: 27 January 1961 (age 65) Lavelanet, France

Sport
- Country: Canada
- Sport: Fencing
- Club: Scaramouche Fencing Club
- Retired: 1996
Medal record
Representing Canada
Pan American Games
| Gold medal – first place | 1987 Indianapolis | Individual sabre |
| Bronze medal – third place | 1983 Caracas | Team sabre |
| Bronze medal – third place | 1983 Caracas | Individual sabre |
| Bronze medal – third place | 1987 Indianapolis | Team sabre |
| Bronze medal – third place | 1991 Havana | Team sabre |

Jean-Paul Banos (born 27 January 1961) is a Canadian former fencer, who lives in Montreal, Canada. He competed in the individual and team sabre events at four consecutive Olympic Games between 1984 and 1996. At the 1992 Summer Olympics, he defeated Russian future Olympic champion Stanislav Pozdnyakov of the gold-medal-winning Unified Team.

His brother, Jean-Marie Banos, also fenced for Canada at four Olympic Games.

Banos now coaches at HuaHua Fencing Club in Markham, Canada.
