= Oscar Arango =

Colombian fencer (born 1965)

Personal information
- Born: 30 August 1965 (age 60) Medellín, Colombia

Sport
- Sport: Fencing
Medal record
Representing Colombia
Pan American Games
Silver medal – second place	1991 Havana	Team épée

Oscar Arango (born 30 August 1965) is a Colombian fencer. He competed in the team épée event at the 1988 Summer Olympics.
