= Ed Richards (fencer) =

American fencer

Personal information
- Born: November 3, 1929 Boston, Massachusetts, USA
- Died: November 18, 2012 (aged 83) Las Vegas, Nevada, USA

Sport
- Sport: Fencing

Edwin "Ed" Richards (November 3, 1929 – November 18, 2012) was an American fencer. Richards won the US foil championship in 1962 and 1963, and represented Team USA at the 1959, 1963, and 1967 Pan American Games where he won two gold medals and a silver medal in team competition.

He competed in the individual and team foil events at the 1964 Summer Olympics. He was a 2005 USA Fencing Hall of Fame inductee.

== See also ==
- List of USFA Hall of Fame members
