= Bruno Deschênes =

Canadian fencer (born 1963)

Personal information
- Born: 22 May 1963 (age 63) Montreal, Quebec, Canada

Sport
- Sport: Fencing
Medal record
Representing Canada
Pan American Games
Bronze medal – third place	1991 Havana	Team sabre

Bruno Deschênes (born 22 May 1963) is a Canadian fencer. He competed in the team sabre event at the 1988 Summer Olympics.
