= Jon Normile =

American fencer

Personal information
- Born: July 20, 1967 (age 59) Cleveland, Ohio, United States

Sport
- Sport: Fencing
- College team: Columbia Lions
Medal record
Representing United States
Pan American Games
Silver medal – second place	1991 Havana	Individual épée
Bronze medal – third place	1991 Havana	Team épée

Jon Michael Normile (born July 20, 1967) is an American fencer. He competed in the individual épée event at the 1992 Summer Olympics.

He fenced for the Columbia Lions fencing team. Normile graduated from Columbia University with a B.S. in civil engineering in 1989. He was inducted into the Columbia Athletics Hall of Fame in 2006.

== See also ==
- List of USFA Division I National Champions
- List of NCAA fencing champions
- List of USFA Hall of Fame members
