= Nhi Lan Le =

American fencer

Personal information
- Born: May 30, 1964 (age 62) Nha Trang, Vietnam

Fencing career
- Sport: Fencing
- Country: USA
- Weapon: Épée
- Hand: right-handed
Medal record
Representing United States
Pan American Games
Bronze medal – third place	1999 Winnipeg	Individual épée
Bronze medal – third place	1999 Winnipeg	Team épée

Nhi Lan Le (born May 30, 1964) is an American fencer. She competed in the women's individual and team épée events at the 1996 Summer Olympics.
