= Rex Dyer =

American fencer (1929–2004)

Personal information
- Born: December 28, 1929 Santa Fe, New Mexico, United States
- Died: November 4, 2004 (aged 74) Bryn Mawr, Pennsylvania, United States

Sport
- Sport: Fencing

Rex Dyer (December 28, 1929 – November 4, 2004) was an American fencer. He competed in the team sabre events at the 1956 and 1960 Summer Olympics.

== See also ==
- List of Pennsylvania State University Olympians
