= Fencing at the 1999 Pan American Games =

Fencing at the 1999 Pan American Games lists the results of all fencing-shooting events held at the 1999 Pan American Games in Winnipeg, Canada. Events for both men and women were held.

== Men's events ==
Event	Gold	Silver	Bronze
Individual épée	Carlos Pedroso; Cuba	Jonathan Peña; Puerto Rico	Laurie Shong; Canada
Individual épée	Carlos Pedroso; Cuba	Jonathan Peña; Puerto Rico	Arturo Simont; Mexico
Team épée	Cuba	Chile	Colombia
Individual foil	Rolando Samuel Tucker León; Cuba	Elvis Gregory Gil; Cuba	Zaddick Longenbach; United States
Individual foil	Rolando Samuel Tucker León; Cuba	Elvis Gregory Gil; Cuba	Carlos Rodríguez; Venezuela
Team foil	Cuba	United States	Venezuela
Individual sabre	Cándido Maya; Cuba	Akhnaten Spencer-El; United States	Michel Boulos; Canada
Individual sabre	Cándido Maya; Cuba	Akhnaten Spencer-El; United States	Aristides Faure; Cuba
Team sabre	Canada	Cuba	United States

== Women's events ==
Event	Gold	Silver	Bronze
Individual épée	Mirayda García; Cuba	Tamara Esteri; Cuba	Elida Agüero; Argentina
Individual épée	Mirayda García; Cuba	Tamara Esteri; Cuba	Nhi Lan Le; United States
Team épée	Cuba	Canada	United States
Individual foil	Migsey Dussu Armiñan; Cuba	Cecilia Esteva; Mexico	Adlim Benítez; Cuba
Individual foil	Migsey Dussu Armiñan; Cuba	Cecilia Esteva; Mexico	Julie Mahoney; Canada
Team foil	Cuba	Venezuela	United States

=== Medal table ===
* Host nation (Canada)

Rank	Nation	Gold	Silver	Bronze	Total
1	Cuba	9	3	2	14
2	Canada*	1	1	3	5
3	United States	0	2	5	7
4	Venezuela	0	1	2	3
5	Mexico	0	1	1	2
6	Chile	0	1	0	1
6	Puerto Rico	0	1	0	1
8	Argentina	0	0	1	1
8	Colombia	0	0	1	1
Totals (9 entries)		10	10	15	35
