= Monique de Bruin (fencer) =

American fencer

Personal information
- Born: May 12, 1977 (age 49) Portland, Oregon, US

Sport
- Sport: Fencing
Medal record
Representing United States
Pan American Games
Silver medal – second place	1995 Mar del Plata	Team foil

Monique de Bruin (born May 12, 1977) is a retired American fencer who won a silver medal in the team foil at the 1995 Pan American Games. She won the NCAA Fencing Championships in the individual foil in 1999, and finished second in 2000.
