= Margarita Rodríguez =

Cuban fencer (born 1947)

Personal information
- Born: 30 March 1947 (age 78)

Sport
- Sport: Fencing

Margarita Rodríguez (born 30 March 1947) is a Cuban foil fencer. She competed at the 1968, 1972, 1976 and 1980 Summer Olympics.
