= Harold Goldsmith =

American fencer (1930–2004)

Harold "Hal" Goldsmith
Personal information
- Born: Hans Goldschmidt; July 20, 1930 Gensungen, Felsberg, Hessen, Germany
- Died: March 13, 2004 (aged 73) New York, New York, United States

Sport
- Country: United States
- Sport: Fencing
- Events: Foil and Epee
- College team: The City College of New York
- Club: Fencers Club
Medal record
Men's fencing
Representing United States
Pan American Games
Gold medal – first place	1951 Buenos Aires	Individual Foil
Gold medal – first place	1951 Buenos Aires	Team Foil
Silver medal – second place	1955 Mexico City	Team Epee
Silver medal – second place	1955 Mexico City	Team Foil

Harold David Goldsmith (born Hans Goldschmidt), known as Hal (July 20, 1930 – March 13, 2004) was an American Olympic foil and epee fencer.

== Early and personal life ==
Goldsmith was born in Gensungen, Felsberg, Hessen, Germany, and was Jewish. In 1938 when he was eight years old, his family fled Germany and immigrated to Manhattan. He attended Stuyvesant High School. He served as an officer in the United States Army.

In 1956 he married DelRene Millner and had sons John and Bob. In 1964 they moved to Ardsley, New York, and in 1991 they moved to Chilmark, Massachusetts.

== Fencing career ==
Goldsmith fenced for the Fencers Club in New York. He attended The City College of New York. Goldsmith won the 1952 NCAA (National Collegiate Athletic Association) foil championship. He was inducted into the CCNY Athletic Hall of Fame in 1970.

He won the individual gold medal in foil in the 1955 Pan American Games and 1959 Pan American Games, and a team gold medal in foil in 1959. Goldsmith also won silver medals in both team foil and team epee in 1955.

Goldsmith was a member of three Olympic fencing teams, competing for the United States in 1952 in Helsinki, in 1956 in Melbourne, and in 1960 in Rome. The entire USA Foil Fencing Team at the 1956 Olympics was Jewish, with the other Jewish fencers being Daniel Bukantz, Albert Axelrod, Nathaniel Lubell, and Byron Krieger.

At the US National Championships, Goldsmith won medals in 1952, 1957, and 1960.

Hal Goldsmith died in New York City at the age of 73.

== See also ==
- List of NCAA fencing champions
- List of USFA Hall of Fame members
