= Lourdes Lozano =

Mexican fencer (born 1962)

Personal information
- Full name: Lourdes Lozano Rodríguez
- Born: 24 August 1962 (age 64)

Sport
- Sport: Fencing

Lourdes Lozano Rodríguez (born 24 August 1962) is a Mexican fencer. She competed in the women's individual foil event at the 1984 Summer Olympics.
