= Raúl Martínez (fencer) =

Argentine fencer (born 1926)

Personal information
- Full name: Raúl Martínez Marquínez
- Born: 9 November 1926 Córdoba, Argentina

Sport
- Sport: Fencing

Raúl Martínez (born 9 November 1926) is an Argentine fencer who competed in the individual épée event at the 1960 Summer Olympics.
