= Amateur Fencers League of America =

The Amateur Fencers League of America (AFLA) was founded on April 22, 1891, in New York City by a group of fencers seeking independence from the Amateur Athletic Union. As early as 1940, the AFLA was recognized by the Fédération Internationale d'Escrime (FIE) and the United States Olympic Committee as the national governing body for fencing in the United States.

== History ==
=== 1891–1956 ===
Less than a year after the AFLA's founding, friendly relations were restored with the AAU. The AFLA grew slowly, with New York City initially dominating American fencing. The first competitions were visually judged using a jury of three people. Early rules included provisions to award points based on good form.

Initially, members of the AFLA were only white men, and it excluded women, Jews, Blacks, and others from membership.

During the AFLA's first year, divisional organizations formed in New England and Nebraska, while the New York fencers remained in the "non-divisional group". The first section (composed of three or more divisions), the Pacific Coast section, was formed in 1925, followed in 1934 by the Mid-West section. In 1939, the national championships were held in San Francisco, the first time they had ever been held outside New York City. The All-Eastern section was recognized in 1939 as well.

By 1940, the rules had been revised several times. Points for good form were no longer awarded, the jury had been expanded to four judges and a director, and rules for electrically judged épée bouts were adopted. Foil and sabre bouts remained visually judged, and electrical épée bouts were the exception rather than the rule.

The AFLA remained a small organization for the first fifty years of its existence, with approximately 1,250 members in 1940. It had grown from three divisions to 25, with about 300 scheduled competitions each year. Despite its small size, the AFLA fielded teams to represent the United States in fencing events at all of the Summer Olympic Games from 1904 onward.

In 1949, the AFLA made American Fencing (at that time a bi-monthly magazine) the official publication of the league. Continued growth resulted in the formation of the Southwest section in 1950 and the North Atlantic section in 1955 (the All-Eastern section was discontinued).

The league maintained a strict amateur code. Until 1953, professionals (those who received financial compensation for fencing or for teaching fencing) were excluded from membership in the AFLA. Competition for professionals was limited.

=== 1957–1983 ===
By 1957, the AFLA was scheduling more than 400 competitions every year. The Cold War was affecting many sports, including fencing; the Soviet Bloc nations began systematically reinventing fencing to take advantage of the new electrical foil. In order to remain competitive internationally, AFLA fencers had to adapt to the emerging style.

Steady growth of the league continued, and in 1964, the AFLA incorporated as a nonprofit in Pennsylvania. By this time, more foil and épée competitions were being judged electrically than visually (sabre remained visually judged). In addition to the non-divisional group, the AFLA boasted 49 active divisions.

The AFLA changed its name to the United States Fencing Association (cf.) in June 1981. In 1982, the organization moved its headquarters to Colorado Springs, Colorado.

These events in the early 1980s solidified the evolutionary branching between fencing (under the USFA) and standard fencing (which in 2006 began to experience a revival under the fledgling American Fencing League). The intervening two decades also brought on the classical fencing and historical fencing movements, neither of which have much connection to USFA/AFLA fencing.

== Rules ==
The AFLA's rules of fencing went through many revisions. The following is a summary of the revisions:

=== 1891 edition ===
- Four pages in length.
- Jury of three apparently co-equal judges.
- Points awarded for form and for touches.
- Target area at foil excludes the back.
- Dark fencing jackets required.
- Jabs (elbow beginning behind the hip) do not count.
- Field of play is 20 feet by 3 feet.
- Crossing a boundary with any part of the foot results in a deduction of one point.
- All weapons contested to five touches, with points for form added on.
- No time limits.
- It is implied that women are not permitted to compete.

=== 1937 edition ===
- American women fencers were originally required to wear skirts when competing. In 1937, the AFLA issued a new rule book stating, among other things, that after September 1, 1939, women would be allowed to wear either a "divided skirt" or "loose-fitting white trousers fastened below the knee".

=== 1940 edition ===
- 121 pages in length.
- Jury of four judges and a director.
- Points awarded solely for delivering a touch.
- The back is valid target in all three weapons.
- White fencing jackets required.
- Explanation of right-of-way replaces "no jabbing rule".
- Field of play is 40 feet long by between 1.8 and 2.0 meters in width.
- Crossing the rear limit with both feet (at any time at foil, and for the second time at sabre and épée) results in a point for the other fencer.
- Crossing the side limit with both feet results in the loss of 1 meter of ground.
- Foil and sabre bouts are to five touches or ten minutes.
- Épée bouts are to one touch or five minutes or, to two or three touches or ten minutes.
- Women allowed to compete at foil (bouts are to four points or eight minutes), but touches below the waist (delineated by a dark-colored sash) are off-target.
- Warnings are given when there are two minutes remaining, and again when there is one minute left.
- In foil and sabre, tie scores are decided via sudden death, while in épée ties result in a loss for both fencers.
- The scores of bouts that go to time are advanced an equal amount until one fencer has five points (e.g. an actual score of 3-1 is recorded as 5–3; 1-0 is recorded as 5–4).
- At épée and sabre, the fencer is allowed to retreat twice as far as in foil, effectively doubling the length of the strip.
- Touches which arrive off-target (at sabre and foil) as a result of a parry do not stop the phrase.
- Reversal of positions of the fencers is permitted at standard épée, but not electrical épée.
- Electrical épée rules included.
- Rules for three-weapon team and individual competition included.
- Rules for indoor (foil, épée, and sabre) and outdoor (épée and sabre only) competitions included.
- Fencers are classified as Prep, Novice, Junior, Intermediate, or Senior based upon past competitive performance. Changes in classification occur after each competition.

=== 1957 edition ===
- 151 pages in length.
- Electrical foil rules included for the first time. Target area for electrical foil excludes the bib of the fencing mask.
- Épée bouts are to one touch or five minutes or, to two to five touches or ten minutes.
- Alternate rules for 8-point bouts (women's foil) and 10-point bouts (men at all weapons), with a requirement of a two-point advantage are included (15-minute time limit).
- Touches which arrive off-target (at sabre and foil) as a result of a parry stop the phrase.
- Three-weapon bouts are limited to five minutes per weapon.
- At foil, sabre, and multi-touch épée, tie scores are decided via sudden death, while at one-touch épée ties result in a loss for both fencers.
- At foil, fencers are given a warning when they get within one meter of the rear limit of the strip.
- At sabre and épée, fencers are given a warning when they get within two meters of the rear limit of the strip.
- Reversal of positions of the fencers is permitted at both standard and electrical épée.
- Fencers are classified as unclassified, C, B, or A. Changes in classification occur at the end of the season.

=== 1965 edition ===
- 287 pages in length.
- Target area for foil uniformly excludes the bib of the fencing mask.
- Field of play for épée and sabre is extended to 14 meters in length, with a uniform warning line for all weapons.
- Crossing the rear limit with both feet results in a point for the other fencer.
- Crossing the side limit with both feet results in the loss of 1 meter of ground in foil or 2 meters of ground in sabre and épée.
- At all weapons, fencers are given a warning when they retreat past the warning line.
- Time limits for all weapons are 5 minutes for 4-touch bouts, 6 minutes for 5-touch bouts, 10 minutes for 8-touch bouts, and 12 minutes for 10-touch bouts.
- A warning is given when there is one minute left.
- Outdoor sabre competition eliminated.
- Three-weapon events eliminated.
- Reversal of positions of the fencers is prohibited at all weapons.
- Target area for women's foil made the same as for men's foil.

== Divisions ==
Most of the activity in the AFLA occurred at the divisional level. As a democratic organization, divisions enjoyed almost complete autonomy.

=== 1892 divisions ===
- Non-divisional group (mostly from New York City)
- New England
- Nebraska

=== 1940 divisions ===
Active (25)

- Non-divisional group (mostly from New York City)
- Buffalo (New York)
- Central Illinois
- Columbus (Ohio)
- Connecticut
- Delaware
- Florida
- Hawaii
- Illinois
- Long Island (New York)
- Michigan
- Mid-New York State
- New England
- New Jersey
- New Orleans (Louisiana)
- Northern California
- Northern Ohio
- Philadelphia (Pennsylvania)
- Rhode Island
- St. Louis (Missouri)
- Southern California
- Texas
- Utah
- Washington, D.C.
- West Point (New York)
- Western Massachusetts

Inactive (10)

- Baltimore (Maryland)
- Birmingham (Alabama)
- Dayton (Ohio)
- Ithaca (New York)
- Nebraska
- Oregon
- Pittsburgh (Pennsylvania)
- Sacramento (California)
- Seattle (Washington)
- Toronto (Canada)

=== 1956 divisions ===
Active (42)

- Non-divisional group
- Arizona
- Border (Texas)
- Central Illinois
- Colorado
- Columbus (Ohio)
- Connecticut
- Delaware
- Florida
- Georgia
- Gulf Coast (Texas)
- Harrisburg (Pennsylvania)
- Hudson-Berkshire (New York and Massachusetts)
  (formerly Ithaca and Western Massachusetts divisions)
- Illinois
- Inland Empire (Washington and Idaho)
- Iowa
- Kentucky
- Long Island (New York)
- Maryland (formerly Baltimore)
- Metropolitan New York
- Miami Valley (Ohio)
- Michigan
- Mid-New York State
- Minnesota
- Nebraska
- New England
- New Jersey
- New Mexico
- New Orleans (Louisiana)
- North Carolina
- Northern California
- Northern Ohio (formerly Dayton)
- North Texas
- Oregon
- Philadelphia (Pennsylvania)
- St. Louis (Missouri)
- Seattle (Washington)
- Southern California
- Tennessee
- Washington, D.C.
- Westchester, New York
- Western New York (formerly Buffalo)
- Wisconsin

Inactive (10)

- Alaska
- Birmingham (Alabama)
- Hawaii
- Pittsburgh (Pennsylvania)
- Rhode Island
- Sacramento (California)
- San Diego (California)
- Utah
- West Point (New York)

=== 1964 divisions ===
Active (49)

- Non-divisional group
- Arizona
- Northern California
- Southern California
- Colorado
- Connecticut
- Delaware
- Florida
- Central Florida
- Florida Gateway
- Florida Gold Coast
- Georgia
- Illinois
- Central Illinois
- Indianapolis (Indiana)
- Iowa
- Kansas
- Kentucky
- Maryland
- Michigan
- Minnesota
- St. Louis (Missouri)
- Nevada
- New England
- New Jersey
- New Mexico
- Hudson-Berkshire (New York and Massachusetts)
- Long Island (New York)
- Metropolitan New York
- Westchester, New York
- Western New York
- West Point (New York)
- North Carolina
- North Dakota
- Columbus (Ohio)
- Miami Valley (Ohio)
- Northern Ohio
- Southwest Ohio
- Oklahoma
- Oregon
- Harrisburg (Pennsylvania)
- Philadelphia (Pennsylvania)
- Western Pennsylvania
- Border (Texas)
- Gulf Coast (Texas)
- North Texas
- Washington, D.C.
- Western Washington (formerly Seattle)
- West Virginia
- Wisconsin

Inactive (11)

- Birmingham (Alabama)
- Alaska
- Sacramento (California)
- San Diego (California)
- Hawaii
- Inland Empire (Washington and Idaho)
- New Orleans (Louisiana)
- Mid-New York State
- Nebraska
- Pittsburgh (Pennsylvania)
- Rhode Island
- Tennessee
- Utah

== Officers ==
Presidents
(in order of service, through 1964)

- Dr. Graeme M. Hammond (1891–1925)
- Col. Henry Breckinridge
- F. Barnard O'Connor
- Leon M. Schoonmaker
- Harold Van Buskirk
- John R. Huffman
- Dernell Every
- Miguel A. de Capriles
- Jose R. de Capriles
- Donald S. Thompson (born 1957)
  first president from outside of New York City
- Dr. Paul Makler Sr. (born 1964)

Secretaries
(in order of service, through 1964)

- W. Scott O'Connor
- F. Barnard O'Connor
- Leon M. Schoonmaker
- J. Howard Hanway
- Ervin S. Acel
- Dernell Every
- Warren A. Dow
- Ralph Goldstein (1913–1997)
- Allan S. Kwartler (1917–1998)
- Anthony J. Orsi

Treasurers
(in order of service, through 1970)
(office combined with secretary prior to 1936)

- J. Howard Hanway
- George Cochrane
- Robert S. Driscoll
- Rudolph Ozol
- Leo Sobel
- Peter Tishman

== Discrimination ==
Initially, members of the Association (then called the Amateur Fencers League of America) were only white men, and it excluded women, Jews, Blacks, and others from membership. In 1938, Helene Mayer won the Fencing Association's San Francisco Division men's title; however, two days later she was stripped of the title, as the Association adopted a rule banning competition between women and men, stating that since fencing involved physical contact, "a chivalrous man found it difficult to do his worst when he faced a woman." The restriction was later lifted in the 1950s.

== See also ==
- Classical fencing
- Historical fencing
- U.S. Fencing Coaches Association
