= Greg Massialas =

American fencer

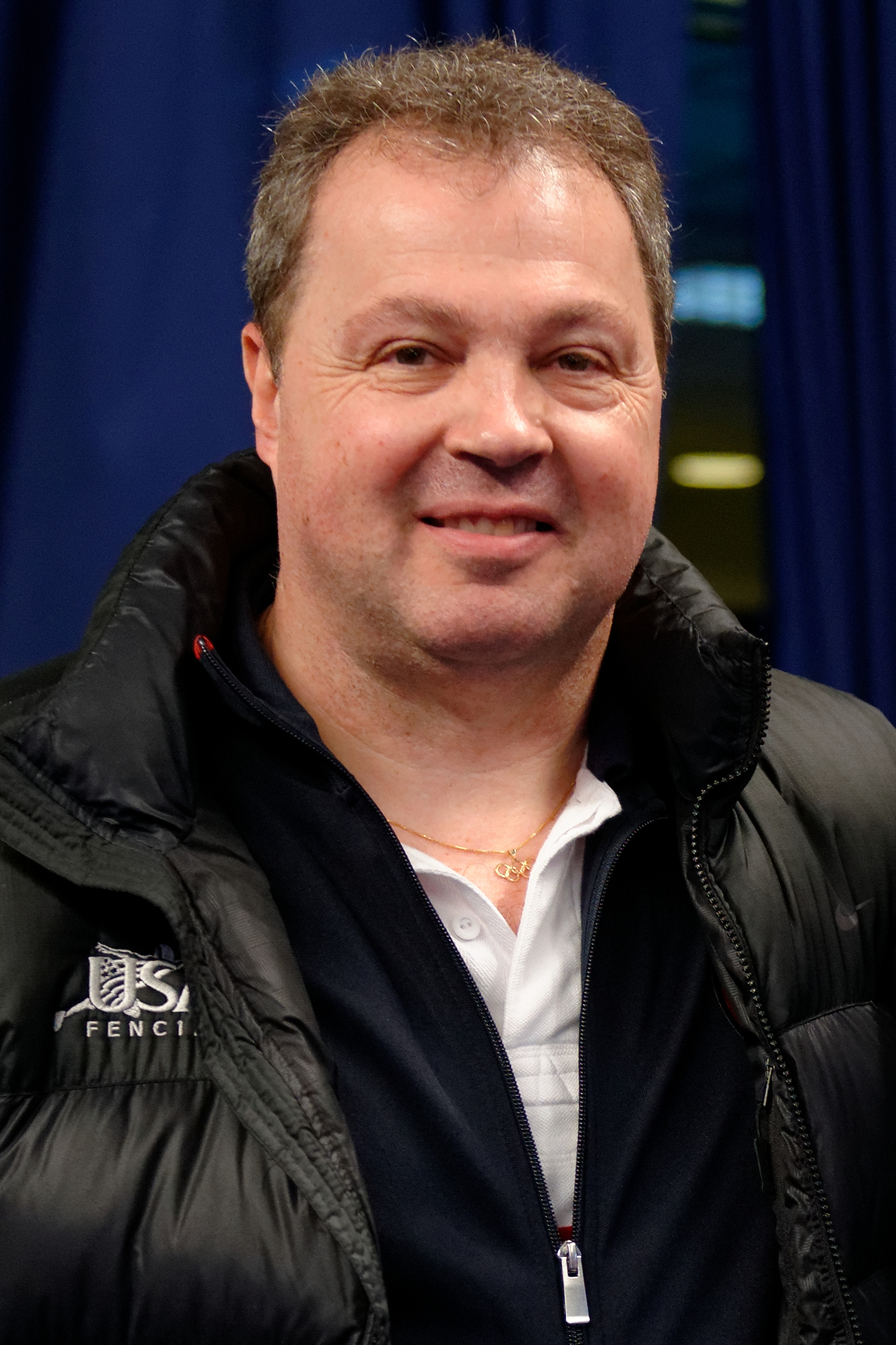
- Massialas at the Paris World Cup 2014

Personal information
- Born: May 20, 1956 (age 70) Heraklion, Crete, Greece
- Height: 1.83 m (6 ft 0 in)
- Weight: 75 kg (165 lb)

Fencing career
- Sport: Fencing
- Weapon: Foil

Gregory David Massialas (born May 20, 1956) is an American foil fencer and fencing coach.

== Career ==
Massilais fenced for San Jose State University. A reserve for the 1976 Summer Olympics in Montreal, he was set to make his Olympic début at the Moscow Games in 1980, but did not compete due to the 66-team boycott of the games. He was one of 461 athletes to receive a Congressional Gold Medal the same year. He competed at the 1984 and 1988 Summer Olympics. Massialas also competed at the 1979, 1983, and 1987 Pan American Games, winning four medals, two silvers and two bronzes in foil fencing.

He is the founder and head coach of the Massialas Foundation (MTEAM), a fencing club in San Francisco. Since 2012 he is the national coach of the United States senior foil team, which includes his own son Alexander. He brought the club to a No.1 world ranking, with each of its four members ranking individually in the Top 10 and Miles Chamley-Watson winning the 2013 World Fencing Championships. Massialas' daughter Sabrina, now a senior, is also a high-level foil fencer. His son Alexander, competed in the 2010 Summer Youth Olympics and the 2012, 2016 and 2020 Summer Olympics in fencing for the USA.

== See also ==
- List of USFA Division I National Champions
- List of USFA Hall of Fame members
