= Fencing at the 1995 Pan American Games =

The fencing competitions at the 1995 Pan American Games took place in Mar Del Plata, Argentina.

== Men's events ==
| Event | Gold | Silver | Bronze |
|---|---|---|---|
| Individual épée | Carlos Pedroso; Cuba | Tamir Bloom; United States | Paris Inostroza; Chile |
| Individual épée | Carlos Pedroso; Cuba | Tamir Bloom; United States | Iván Trevejo Pérez; Cuba |
| Team épée | Cuba | United States | Colombia |
| Individual foil | Elvis Gregory Gil; Cuba | Rolando Samuel Tucker León; Cuba | Eric Bravin; United States; Leandro Marchetti; Argentina |
| Team foil | Cuba | United States | Argentina |
| Individual sabre | Peter Westbrook; United States | Aristides Faure; Cuba | Alexis Leyva; Cuba; Carlos Bravo; Venezuela |
| Team sabre | United States; Peter Westbrook; John Friedberg; Michael D'Asaro Jr. Tom Strzalkowski | Cuba; Alexis Leyva; Aristides Faure; Pedro Cabezas; Agustin Garcia | Canada; Leszek Nowosielski; Jean-Marie Bonos; Tony Plourde; Maxime Soucy |

== Women's events ==
| Event | Gold | Silver | Bronze |
|---|---|---|---|
| Individual épée | Leslie Marx; United States | Milagros Palma González; Cuba | Yolitzin Martinez; Mexico |
| Individual épée | Leslie Marx; United States | Milagros Palma González; Cuba | Yurina Suarez; Cuba |
| Team épée | United States | Cuba | Canada |
| Individual foil | Ann Marsh; United States | Idoris Diaz; Cuba | Barbara Hernandez; Cuba |
| Individual foil | Ann Marsh; United States | Idoris Diaz; Cuba | Felicia Zimmerman; United States |
| Team foil | Cuba; Idoris Diaz; Barbara Hernandez; Caridad Estrada; Migsey Dussu | United States; Ann Marsh; Olga Chernyak; Felicia Zimmermann; Monique De Bruin | Argentina; Alejandra Carbone; Yanina Iannuzzi; Dolores Pampin; Sandra Giancolo |

== Medal table ==
| Place | Nation | Gold medal | Silver medal | Bronze medal | Total |
|---|---|---|---|---|---|
| 1 | Cuba | 5 | 6 | 4 | 15 |
| 2 | United States | 5 | 4 | 2 | 11 |
| 3 | Argentina | 0 | 0 | 3 | 3 |
| 4 | Canada | 0 | 0 | 2 | 2 |
| 5 | Chile | 0 | 0 | 1 | 1 |
| 5 | Colombia | 0 | 0 | 1 | 1 |
| 5 | Mexico | 0 | 0 | 1 | 1 |
| 5 | Venezuela | 0 | 0 | 1 | 1 |
| Total | | 10 | 10 | 15 | 35 |
