= Fencing at the Pan American Games =

- No. of events: 12 (men: 6; women: 6)

Fencing has been contested at the Pan American Games since the inaugural games in 1951, without ever leaving the program.

At the 2011 Pan American Games, for the first time in history all twelve events were played for the first time.

== Medal table ==
Updated after the 2023 Pan American Games.

Rank	Nation	Gold	Silver	Bronze	Total
1	United States	88	60	41	189
2	Cuba	56	32	31	119
3	Argentina	13	16	29	58
4	Canada	8	25	43	76
5	Venezuela	7	19	28	54
6	Mexico	3	6	18	27
7	Brazil	2	5	19	26
8	Chile	0	6	5	11
9	Colombia	0	2	8	10
10	Dominican Republic	0	2	0	2
11	Panama	0	1	3	4
12	Puerto Rico	0	1	2	3
13	Uruguay	0	1	1	2
14	Peru	0	1	0	1
Totals (14 entries)		177	177	228	582
