= AfroLatinidad =

Cultural identity

AfroLatinidad or Afro-Latinidad is a collective cultural identity of Latinos of full or partial African descent. There are an estimated 200 million African descendants in 19 Latin American countries. AfroLatinidad celebrates the cultural similarities among many African Latinos in Latin America. AfroLatinidad is thus born from the mixing of different African, North, South and Central Latin American and indigenous American cultures. Often, seclusion and rejection of Eurocentric national identities force them to become marginalized economically and culturally.

== Overview ==
Most countries in Latin America acknowledge African Latinos in their census; however they are often discriminated against and are not granted social and political equality. Only until recently, 15 million African descendants were recognized in Latin America. Biological identity is a major factor in defining AfroLatinidad and their social status. The widely accepted Eurocentric national identity does not include African Latino populations because of their mixed heritage and physical traits- specifically their dark skin. Their physical bodies do not constitute an authentic or pure meztizaje identity which isolates them socially. AfroLatinidad has brought together the struggles of many African Latinos that mainly focus on high levels of poverty and also a rich cultural diversity. AfroLatinidad celebrates the cultural similarities among many Afro-Latinos in Latin America.

However, a fear of "unbecoming" has been observed in certain AfroLatinidad communities, for example, among Afro-Cubans, as they are "assumed to lose their Cuban identity through assimilation among Afro-Cubans and African-Americans", where Cuban identity is being replaced by one more thoroughly Afro-Latino.

== Cultural Expression ==
In terms of Diaspora, a concept redefined in Juan Flores book The Diaspora Strikes Back, AfroLatinidad's history stretches back from African colonial rules and reinscribed their culture by incorporating Latino traditions. AfroLatinidad is essentially “a way of naming the kind of cultural fusion and hybridization typical of highly diasporic urban settings in the metropolis." AfroLatinos have created outlets for expression including dance, poetry, and music. Afrolatinidad is the collective expression of African Latinos and a declaration of culture through forms of art. Another scholar who helped develop it as a field was Miriam Jiménez Román.

=== Hip Hop ===
Afro Latinos have adopted hip-hop and expressed through lyrics their struggles of living in high poverty neighborhoods in Latin America. AfroLatinidad has captured the essence of hip-hop by using music as an outlet of expression. Hip Hop originated from African American identities in New York City, the cultural context of hip hop reminisce sentiments of African American people. The transcendence of hip-hop from Latin America has emerged from transcultural migration of music. Hip Hop has also become a tool of unification, political voice and cultural representation. Artists like Eli Efi of Brazil rap about the injustices within their societies and the desire for freedom from discrimination and the freedom to black shame. Now, African Latinos can also exercise hip-hop to promote identity and community.

=== Television ===
An important outlet source that documents the story of Afro descendants in Latin America is African Latino television, which documents a new story of Afro descendants. The television documentary series highlights the influence that African descendants have had on Latino culture. African Latino television is working closely to bridge the gap of understanding between the African Latino and Latino communities.

== World Cup ==
As discussed by Jean Muteba Rahier, from Florida International University, many Latino countries define national identity by attempting to encompass a non-AfroLatinidad identity. During the World Cup, countries are able to showcase their identity, which comes at the expense of Afro-Latinos.

AfroLatinidad relies on the World Cup in order for the world to acknowledge the existence of this marginalized culture. The article specifically focuses on Afro-Ecuadorian players Carlos Tenorio and Agustín (Tin) Delgado and states that they “gave national pride to fans of a variety of ethnic and racial backgrounds.” Their communities are represented through the Afro Latino players who were raised within them. Although impoverished, these pockets of culture contain within them a rich mixture of music, food, ideologies, practices, and values struggling against dominate social identities.

== See also ==
- Afro-Latin American
- Afro-Haitian
- Afro-Brazilian
- Afro-Cuban
- Afro-Colombian
- Afro-Dominican
- Afro-Puerto Rican
- Afro-Panamanian
