= Giorgio Santelli =

Italian fencer

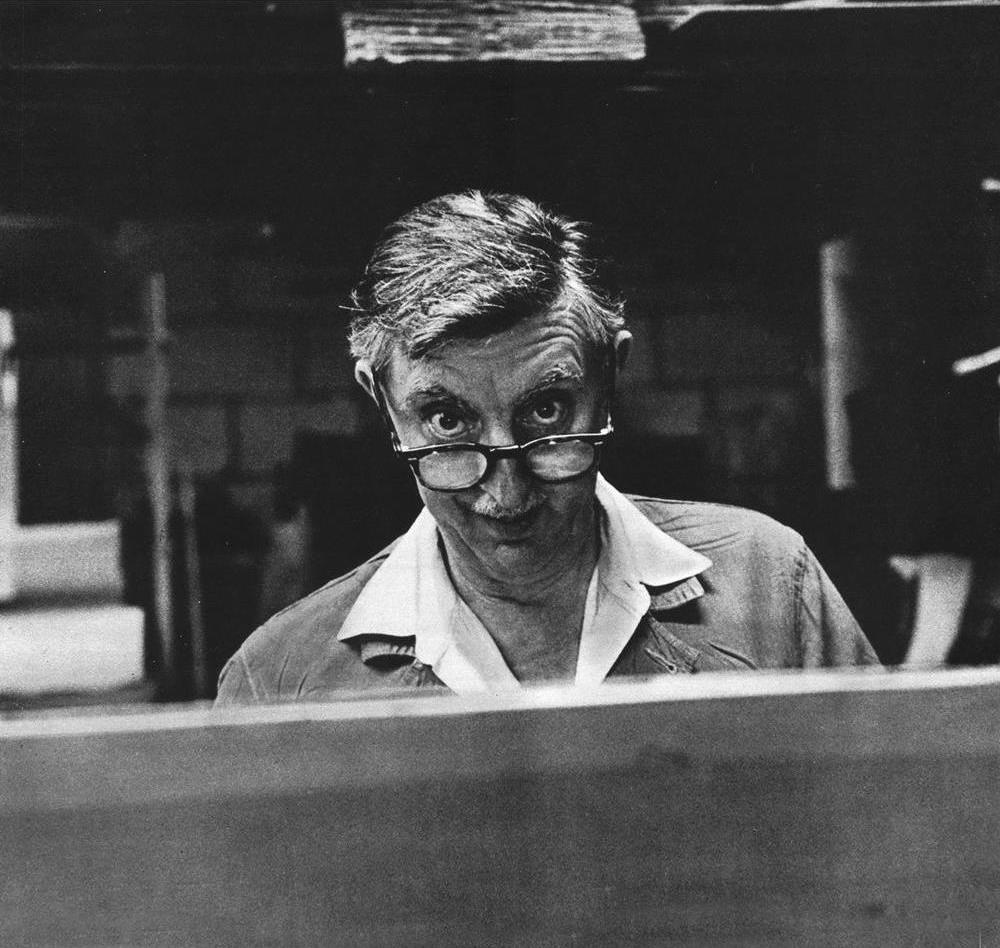
- Santelli circa February 1961

Personal information
- Born: 24 November 1897 Budapest, Hungary
- Died: 8 October 1985 (aged 87) Teaneck, New Jersey, United States

Sport
- Sport: Fencing
Medal record
Men's fencing
Representing Italy
Olympic Games
Gold medal – first place	1920 Antwerp	Sabre, team

Maestro Giorgio Santelli (25 November 1897 – 8 October 1985) was a fencer and fencing master who was part of the Italian team that won the gold medal in Men's team sabre at the 1920 Summer Olympics and was the largest mid-20th century influence in raising the quality and popularity of fencing in the United States, and creator of one of the best-known fencing equipment manufacturers.

== Biography ==
Born in Budapest, Hungary, but always keeping his Italian citizenship, Giorgio was the son of Italo Santelli, a renowned fencing master from Italy who revolutionized sabre technique and was called the "Father of Modern Sabre Fencing".

Giorgio was an Olympian in 1920, where he won a gold medal in the team sabre. He won the Austrian, Hungarian, and Italian sabre championships, and the Austrian and Hungarian foil championships—equivalent to winning the Olympics in two different weapons.

Santelli fought and won a famous duel with Adolfo Cotronei, arising out of an Olympic fencing dispute between his Italian father, Italo, who drove the Hungarian team, and the leader of the Italian team.

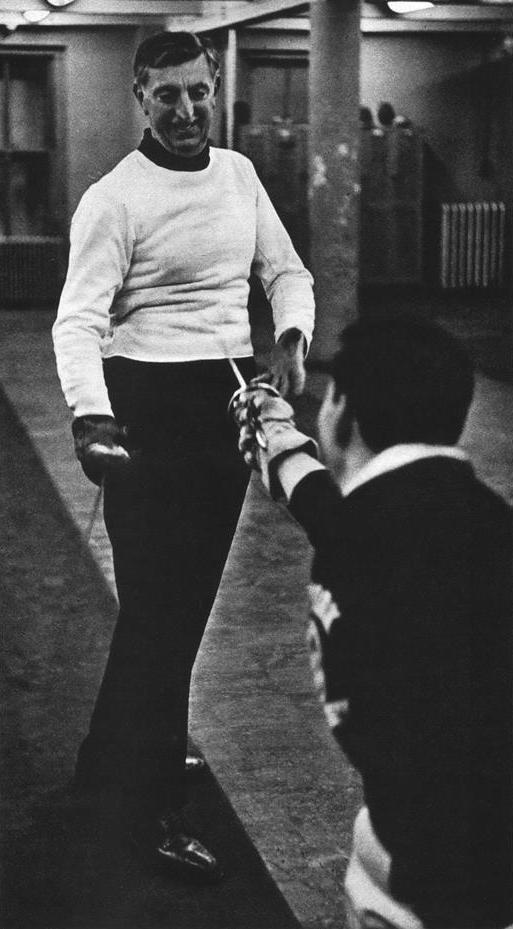
Santelli at Salle Santelli in New York City, circa February 1961

Maestro Santelli immigrated to the U.S. in 1924. He initially taught his art at the New York Athletic Club, before founding Salle Santelli in New York City. Giorgio was the US National Coach for several decades, and the U.S. Olympic Coach in 1928, 1932, 1936, 1948, and 1952. He trained many national team members and champions from the 1940s through the 1980s, teaching champions and prominent fencers including George Worth, Tibor Nyilas, George Kolombatovich, Allan Kwartler, Neil Lazar, Uriah Jones, Robert Russell, Anne O'Donnell Russell, Marty Lang, Denise O'Connor, Ed Ballinger, Israel Colon, Ernest Schmatolla, Maurice Kamhi, Andy Shaw, Ed Wright, and many others. Others who fenced at Salle Santelli included Olympians Norman Lewis, Robert Blum, Ralph Goldstein, Albert Axelrod, and Zaddick Longenbach.

In 1934, he established the United States Fencing Equipment Company, renamed in 1955 to George Santelli, Inc. This was one of the most widely known 20th-century fencing supply houses in the United States.

Santelli tirelessly and generously promoted fencing in all aspects, including stage choreography on Broadway (in productions of Hamlet, Romeo and Juliet, Peter Pan and many others) and providing free instruction to high school fencers. Giorgio generously supported fencing masters coming to the United States, giving them a place to teach until they established their own schools, including great maestros such as Csaba Elthes. Santelli made a unique contribution by tearing down the colour barrier that existed in what had been a patrician sport, inviting black fencers to his club at a time when fencing had been a segregated activity, and producing Olympians and national champions such as Uriah Jones, Ed Ballinger, and Ed Wright.

== Hall of Fame ==
Santelli was inducted into the USFA Hall of Fame in 1963.

== Death ==
A resident of Leonia, New Jersey, he died on 8 October 1985, in nearby Teaneck, at the age of 87.

== See also ==
- Fencing
- USFA
- USFA Hall of Fame
- List of USFA Hall of Fame members
