= Rafael Suárez (fencer) =

Venezuelan-American fencer (born 1972)

Personal information
- Nationality: American
- Born: 23 March 1972 (age 54) Caracas
- Height: 1.83 m (6 ft 0 in)
- Weight: 170 lb (77 kg)

Sport
- Country: United States
- Sport: Fencing
- Event: Foil
- Club: Masters Fencing Club
- Coached by: Orlando Suárez
- Now coaching: Head Coach Masters Fencing Club

Achievements and titles
- Olympic finals: 1996, 2000
- Highest world ranking: Current Vets World Ranking 3
Medal record
Men's Foil
Representing United States
Veteran World Championships
Silver medal – second place	2024 Dubai	Team Foil
Bronze medal – third place	2022 Zadar	Individual Foil
Bronze medal – third place	2024 Dubai	Individual Foil
Bronze medal – third place	2025 Manama	Team Foil
World Cups
Bronze medal – third place	2010 Margarita	Individual Foil
Representing Venezuela
World Cups
Bronze medal – third place	1997 Valencia	Team Senior Foil
Gold medal – first place	1989 Hamburg	Individual Junior Foil
World Championships
Bronze medal – third place	1989 Lisboa	Individual Cadet Foil
Pan American Games
Bronze medal – third place	1999 Winnipeg	Individual Foil
Bronze medal – third place	1999 Winnipeg	Team Foil
Bronze medal – third place	1995 Mar de Plata	Individual Foil
Pan American Championships
Gold medal – first place	1992 Merida	Individual Junior Foil
Gold medal – first place	1992 Merida	Team Junior Foil
Gold medal – first place	1991 New York	Individual Junior Foil
Central American and Caribbean Games
Bronze medal – third place	1998 Maracaibo	Team Foil
Bronze medal – third place	1993 Ponce	Individual Foil
Silver medal – second place	1993 Ponce	Team Foil
Bronze medal – third place	1990 Mexico	Individual Foil
Silver medal – second place	1990 Mexico	Team Foil
Central American and Caribbean Championships
Gold medal – first place	1992 Cali	Individual Foil
Gold medal – first place	1992 Cali	Team Foil
Gold medal – first place	1991 Barquisimeto	Individual Foil
Gold medal – first place	1991 Barquisimeto	Team Foil
Sur American Championships
Gold medal – first place	1990 São Paulo	Individual Junior Foil
Gold medal – first place	1990 São Paulo	Team Foil
Gold medal – first place	1989 Porto Alegre	Individual Junior Foil
Gold medal – first place	1989 Porto Alegre	Team Foil
Gold medal – first place	1989 Porto Alegre	Individual Cadet Foil
Silver medal – second place	1988 Buenos Aires	Individual Cadet Foil
Bronze medal – third place	1987 Caracas	Individual Cadet Foil

Rafael Suárez (born 23 March 1972) is a Venezuelan-American fencer and USA International Team fencer. He competed in the individual and team foil events at the 1996 Summer Olympics and individual at the 2000 Summer Olympics. He is a former United States Fencing Association Athlete Representative of Men's Foil and member of the Scholastic/Collegiate Task Force Committee. He hold the Athlete Representative position from 2010 until 2016. Suárez is the current Chairman of the Gold Coast Florida Division of the US Fencing.

In June 2010 Suárez competed in the Senior World Cup for the US Team winning a bronze medal in the individual event.

Suárez is a world class coach. He was an Olympics Coach in the Men's Foil event in the 2024 Summer Olympics in Paris.
