= Grandbois =

Grandbois is a surname of French origin, identified in particular in French America. Notable people with the surname include:

- Alain Grandbois (1900–1975), poet and writer from Saint-Casimir, Quebec, having received the Prix Athanase-David three times in 1941, 1947 and 1969
- Paul-Étienne Grandbois (1846–1907), a doctor and politician from Quebec, Canada
- Peter Grandbois (born 1964), an American writer, publisher, academic and fencing trainer

== See also ==
- Grandbois Lake, a freshwater body straddling the municipalities of Rivière-à-Pierre and Saint-Raymond, in Portneuf Regional County Municipality, Capitale-Nationale, Quebec, Canada
- Prix Alain-Grandbois (English: Alain-Grandbois Prize), a literary prize of Quebec awarded each year
