= 2026 Veteran Fencing World Championships =

Sports competition

- Dates: 9–17 October
- Host city: Tbilisi, Georgia
- Events: 36

The 2026 Veteran Fencing World Championships took place from 9 to 17 October 2026 in Tbilisi, Georgia.

== Medals summary ==
=== Vet-40 ===
==== Men ====
Event	Gold	Silver	Bronze
Épée Individual	Jean-Emmanuel Remoue; France	Dmitrii Borodako; Russia	Konstantin Semenov; Russia
Épée Individual	Jean-Emmanuel Remoue; France	Dmitrii Borodako; Russia	Rosislav Rusev; Bulgaria
Foil Individual	Jordan Moine; France	Pawel Szumielewicz; Poland	Clement Desvaux; France
Foil Individual	Jordan Moine; France	Pawel Szumielewicz; Poland	Daniel Tuerkis; Germany
Sabre Individual	Alexander Weber; Argentina	Leonid Davydov; Russia	Christophe Turlier; France
Sabre Individual	Alexander Weber; Argentina	Leonid Davydov; Russia	Vladimir Seredinin; Russia

==== Women ====
Event	Gold	Silver	Bronze
Épée Individual	Julia Ashchuk; Russia	Cassandra Bates; United States	Lacey Biniak; United States
Épée Individual	Julia Ashchuk; Russia	Cassandra Bates; United States	Maria Sapin-Dornacher; Switzerland
Foil Individual	Marta Cammilletti; Italy	Yulia Biryukova; Russia	Annaick Ferrari; France
Foil Individual	Marta Cammilletti; Italy	Yulia Biryukova; Russia	Christina Kaneshige; United States
Sabre Individual	Rabea Hambach-Richter; Germany	Nguyen Thi Hai Yen; Australia	Jessica De Morais; France
Sabre Individual	Rabea Hambach-Richter; Germany	Nguyen Thi Hai Yen; Australia	Svetlana Verteletskaia; Russia

=== Vet-50 ===
==== Men ====
Event	Gold	Silver	Bronze
Épée Individual	Gildas Le Treut; France	Antti Kerminen; Finland	Vincent Soland; France
Épée Individual	Gildas Le Treut; France	Antti Kerminen; Finland	Thomas Poenisch; Germany
Foil Individual	Cyril Lacroix; France	Dmitrii Sitnikov; Russia	Nicolas Piofret; France
Foil Individual	Cyril Lacroix; France	Dmitrii Sitnikov; Russia	Filippo Pesce; Italy
Sabre Individual	Dmitrii Kustov; Russia	Michael Herm; Germany	Masaaki Kikuchi; Japan
Sabre Individual	Dmitrii Kustov; Russia	Michael Herm; Germany	Taras Kashinskiy; Russia

==== Women ====
Event	Gold	Silver	Bronze
Épée Individual	Leslie Marx; United States	Nathalie Vandewalle; Belgium	Carole Charroy; France
Épée Individual	Leslie Marx; United States	Nathalie Vandewalle; Belgium	Sandrine Dumoulin; France
Foil Individual	Maki Isomoto; Japan	Ulrike Bernau; Germany	Valerie Preaux; France
Foil Individual	Maki Isomoto; Japan	Ulrike Bernau; Germany	Martina Ganassin; Italy
Sabre Individual	Daniela Colaiacomo; Italy	Yelena Kalkina; United States	Julie Seal; United States
Sabre Individual	Daniela Colaiacomo; Italy	Yelena Kalkina; United States	Gesche Reimers; Germany

=== Vet-60 ===
==== Men ====
Event	Gold	Silver	Bronze
Épée Individual	Olivier Guilbert; France	Sean Ameli; United States	Evgeny Belousov; Russia
Épée Individual	Olivier Guilbert; France	Sean Ameli; United States	Gerald Hinz; Germany
Foil Individual	Hans Rijsenbrij; Netherlands	Roman Christen; Germany	Paul Epply-Schmidt; United States
Foil Individual	Hans Rijsenbrij; Netherlands	Roman Christen; Germany	Nigel Nutt; Australia
Sabre Individual	Alberto Feira Chios; Italy	George Matt; United States	Michael Bacon; United States
Sabre Individual	Alberto Feira Chios; Italy	George Matt; United States	Sergey Lapshin; Russia

==== Women ====
Event	Gold	Silver	Bronze
Épée Individual	Frauke Hohlbein; Germany	Sarah Osvath; Australia	Rosa Maria Cano Diosa; Spain
Épée Individual	Frauke Hohlbein; Germany	Sarah Osvath; Australia	Carolin Marheineke; Germany
Foil Individual	Gabrielle Fayet; France	Magda Melandri; Italy	Benedicte Bisson; France
Foil Individual	Gabrielle Fayet; France	Magda Melandri; Italy	Christine Zoppke; Germany
Sabre Individual	Lydia Fabry; United States	Michele Narey; Great Britain	Jasmina Denner; United States
Sabre Individual	Lydia Fabry; United States	Michele Narey; Great Britain	Du Min Yi; Australia

=== Vet-70 ===
==== Men ====
Event	Gold	Silver	Bronze
Épée Individual	Jean Stock; Belgium	Bruce Jugan; United States	Giuliano Pianca; Italy
Épée Individual	Jean Stock; Belgium	Bruce Jugan; United States	Francois Gaudry; France
Foil Individual	Paul Wedge; Great Britain	John Lawrence; United States	Maurizio Galvan; Italy
Foil Individual	Paul Wedge; Great Britain	John Lawrence; United States	Henri Darricau; United States
Sabre Individual	Carl Morris; Great Britain	Joseph Streb; United States	Enrico Antinoro; Italy
Sabre Individual	Carl Morris; Great Britain	Joseph Streb; United States	Pedro Carnicer; Spain

==== Women ====
Event	Gold	Silver	Bronze
Épée Individual	Astrid Kircheis; Germany	Marja-Liisa Tuulikki Someroja; Finland	Charlotta Bowie; United States
Épée Individual	Astrid Kircheis; Germany	Marja-Liisa Tuulikki Someroja; Finland	Gianna Cirillo; Italy
Foil Individual	Anne-Marie Walters; United States	Gianna Cirillo; Italy	Corinne Aubailly; France
Foil Individual	Anne-Marie Walters; United States	Gianna Cirillo; Italy	Annabelle Ballard; Australia
Sabre Individual	Heidi Runyan; United States	Yoshiko Chikubu; Japan	Kaoru Amari; Japan
Sabre Individual	Heidi Runyan; United States	Yoshiko Chikubu; Japan	Vivien Ena Frith; Great Britain

=== Vet-Team ===
==== Men ====
Event	Gold	Silver	Bronze
Épée Team	France; Herve Lapierre; Gregory Goetz; François Pawlaczyk; Steeve Blandin; Vincent Soland	Russia; Sergei Tikhomirov; Dmitrii Borodako; Aleksei Mikheikin; Denis Nadtoka; Dmitriy Pavlov	United States; Aaron Gaines; Nicholas Hallman; Philip Hedges; Tommi Hurme; Alexander Tsinis
Foil Team	Poland; Tomasz Cieply; Slawomir Mocek; Tomasz Konczylo; Pawel Szumielewicz; Daniel Przystajko	France; Clement Desvaux; Jessy Bernal; Jordan Moine; Bertrand Beaurenault; Cyril Lacroix	Italy; Ugo Balestrieri; Jacopo Inverardi; Fabio Di Russo; Filippo Pesce; Lorenzo Richiardi
Sabre Team	Russia; Leonid Davydov; Georgii Kirnosov; Taras Kashinskiy; Dmitrii Kustov; Dmitrii Papsuev	Italy; Alessandro Tuccillo; Jacopo Spilimbergo; Oliver Emmerich; Paolo Gay; Alessandro Parise	France; Dominique Queguiner; Emmanuel Tori; Christophe Turlier; Hervé Kessler; David Perraguin

==== Women ====
Event	Gold	Silver	Bronze
Épée Team	United States; Cassandra Bates; Lacey Biniak; Monica Exum; Kristin Foellmer; Leslie Marx	France; Pascale Ergand; Rachel Le Breton; Lia Chevalier; Carole Charroy; Florence Pagny	Italy; Federica Ariaudo; Sibilla Di Guida; Valentina Lattanzi; Iliana Diana Bonato; Barbara Gabella
Foil Team	Russia; Yulia Biryukova; Inessa Rodionova; Larisa Salamandra; Elena Mazina; Zarina Tilliakhodzhaeva	Hungary; Judit Kosa; Krisztina Katalin Herczeg; Anna Maria Toth; Andrea Bernat; Magdolna Madarasz	Italy; Marta Cammilletti; Martina Ganassin; Francesca Zurlo; Paola Quadri; Marianna Attili
Sabre Team	United States; Aziza Hassan; Laura Johnson; Yelena Kalkina; Kathryn Pierrynowski; Julie Seal	Germany; Gunilla Graudins; Nicole Thome; Katalin Di Martino; Cristina Mazzola; Rabea Hambach-Richter	Italy; Martina Ganassin; Costanza Drigo; Veronica De Cicco; Martina Gianecchini; Daniela Colaiacomo

=== Grand Vet-Team ===
==== Men ====
Event	Gold	Silver	Bronze
Épée Team	Germany; Achim Bellmann; Volker Fischer; Werner Hensel; Gerald Hinz; Oliver Klass	Italy; Stefano Caracciolo; Fabio Peruchetti; Giuliano Pianca; Roberto Di Matteo; Luca Magni	United States; Sean Ameli; Jeffrey Hudson; Bruce Jugan; John Moreau; Mark Nixon
Foil Team	Italy; Maurizio Galvan; Francesco Tiberi; Marco Bosio; Fabrizio Capellini; Fabio Miraldi	Germany; Hans-Georg Brinkmann; Hans Martin Raeker; Martin Eitz; Berthold Schaum; Claas Schmolke	Russia; Evgeniy Rafalson; Vasiliy Mishagin; Gari Aftandilov; Igor Kurbatov; Igor Tarasov
Sabre Team	United States; Michael Bacon; Jacaeber Kastor; George Matt; Joseph Streb; Ronald Thornton	Italy; Giulio Paroli; Pasquale Parisi; Alberto Feira Chios; Antonio Luzzo; Luca Falaschi	United Kingdom; Christopher Cranston-Selby; Chris Jupp; Carl Morris; Duncan Rowlands; Emmanuel Therond

==== Women ====
Event	Gold	Silver	Bronze
Épée Team	Germany; Frauke Hohlbein; Astrid Kircheis; Angela Kummich; Bettina Fichtel; Carolin Marheineke	Italy; Gianna Cirillo; Maria Adelaide Marini; Adriana Albini; Ewa Borowa; Sabrina Eugenia Antonietti	France; Corinne Aubailly; Annick Martin; Anne-Marie Sicot; Pascale Appavoupoulle; Gabrielle Fayet
Foil Team	Germany; Margaretha Dresen-Kuchalski; Irina Hilbrich; Astrid Kircheis; Christiane Wagner; Christine Zoppke	Italy; Iris Gardini; Gianna Cirillo; Magda Melandri; Maria Vincenza Saracino; Liqin Wei	United States; Rachel Brown; Bonnie Hennig-Trestman; Margaret Kerr; Judith Offerle; Anne-Marie Walters
Sabre Team	United States; Jasmina Denner; Jane Eyre; Lydia Fabry; Robin Pernice; Heidi Runyan	France; Corinne Aubailly; Martine Schirmer; Patricia Reguigne; Catherine Hori; Agnes Weimar	Japan; Kaoru Amari; Yoshiko Chikubu; Miyako Derose; Kaoru Ishiguro

== Medal table ==
* Host nation (Georgia)

Rank	Nation	Gold	Silver	Bronze	Total
1	United States	8	7	11	26
2	France	7	3	14	24
3	Germany	6	5	6	17
4	Italy	4	7	10	21
5	Russia	4	5	7	16
6	Great Britain	2	1	2	5
7	Japan	1	1	3	5
8	Belgium	1	1	0	2
8	Poland	1	1	0	2
10	Argentina	1	0	0	1
10	Netherlands	1	0	0	1
12	Australia	0	2	3	5
13	Finland	0	2	0	2
14	Hungary	0	1	0	1
15	Spain	0	0	2	2
16	Bulgaria	0	0	1	1
16	Switzerland	0	0	1	1
Totals (17 entries)		36	36	60	132
