= John Moreau =

American fencer

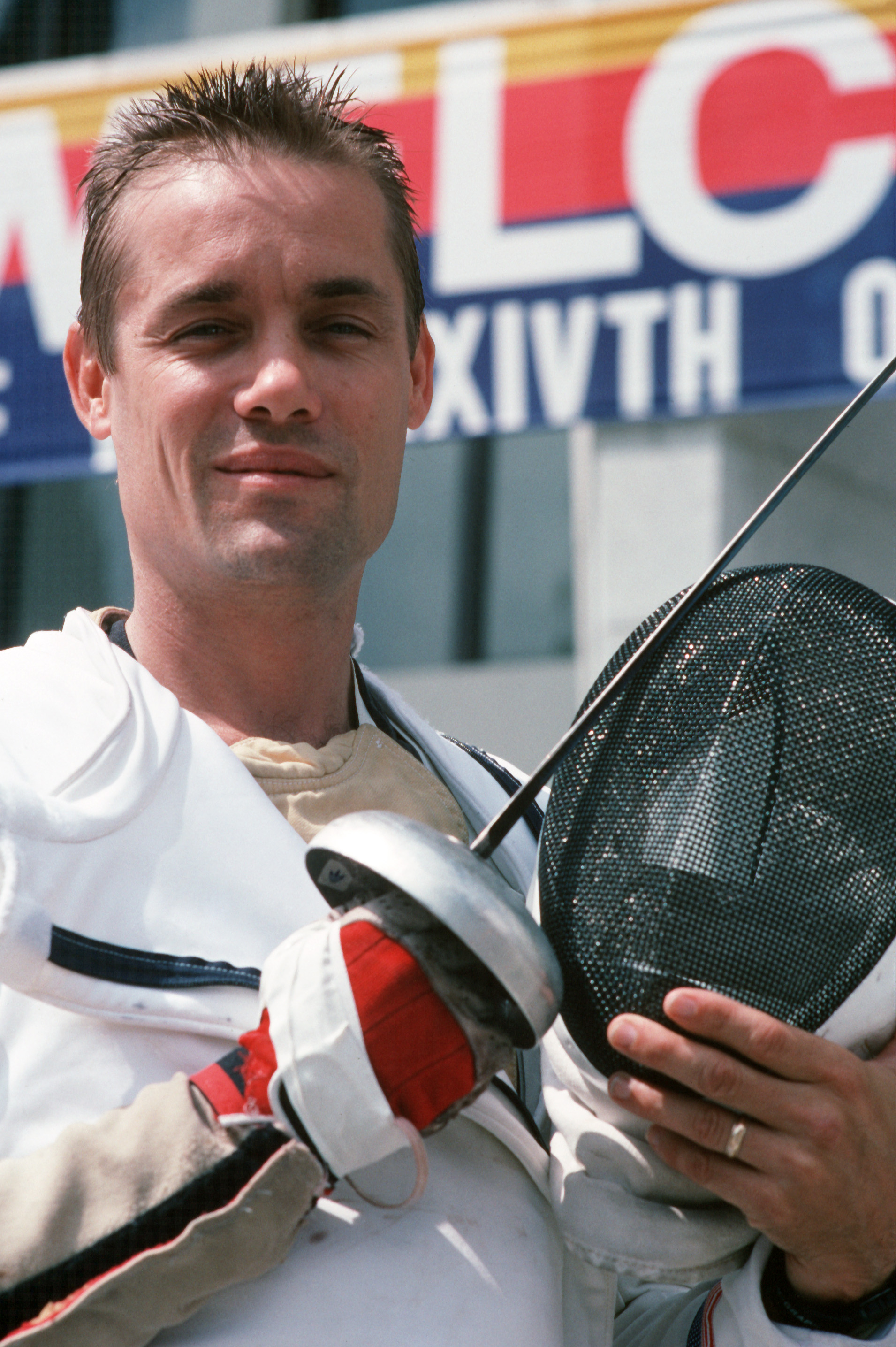
- Moreau in 1988

Personal information
- Born: April 10, 1951 (age 75) Kansas City, Missouri, United States

Sport
- Sport: Fencing
Medal record
Men's Épée
Representing United States
Veteran World Championships
Bronze medal – third place	2026 Tbilisi	Grand team

John Moreau (born April 10, 1951) is an American fencer and modern pentathlete. He competed in the team épée event at the 1984 Summer Olympics. He has worked as a coach in fencing and modern pentathlon, and is the head fencing coach at the University of the Incarnate Word. He is a seven time national champion in the team épée event.

== Biography ==
Moreau was born in Kansas City, Missouri in 1951, and started fencing in 1970. From 1969 to 1972, he attended Binghamton University, competing in multiple sports including fencing, running and swimming. In 1970 and 1971, he was the team MVP at the NCAA Cross Country Championships. He later graduated from Binghamton after a spell in the army, and went on to study at Southwest Texas State University.

At the 1984 Summer Olympics in Los Angeles, Moreau competed in the men's team épée event, with the United States finishing in tenth place. He was also part of the US team for the same event at the 1988 Summer Olympics in Seoul, but he did not feature in any bouts.

While at Southwest Texas State University, Moreau became a fencing coach. The university's team won thirteen state titles from 1984 to 1997 under his leadership. Moreau also coached the US Modern Pentathlon Olympic team. He was later inducted into the hall of fame at Binghamton University. Moreau was ranked the number one international judge in the United States for the modern pentathlon, officiating at the 2008 Summer Olympics and the 2012 Summer Olympics. He is also a black belt in karate.

== See also ==
- List of USFA Hall of Fame members
