= Rachel Fulton Brown =

American medieval historian (born 1965)

Sport
- Country: United States
- Sport: Fencing
- Event: Foil
Medal record
Women's Foil
Representing United States
Veteran World Championships
Gold medal – first place	2025 Manama	Grand Team Foil

Rachel Fulton Brown is an American medievalist and fencer. She is an Associate Professor of Medieval History, Fundamentals, and the College at the University of Chicago.

== Career ==
Fulton Brown has authored a variety of texts on the topic of Christian studies and the Middle Ages.

Comments and blog entries published by Fulton Brown gained attention in academia as part of a broader discussion regarding white nationalism and medieval studies. As described by The New York Times:

The idea of medieval studies as a haven for white nationalist ideas gained ground when Rachel Fulton Brown, an associate professor of medieval history at the University of Chicago, began feuding with Dorothy Kim, an assistant professor of medieval English literature at Brandeis, after Dr. Kim, writing on Facebook, highlighted an old blog post of Dr. Fulton Brown’s titled "Three Cheers for White Men," calling it an example of "medievalists upholding white supremacy."

Fulton Brown subsequently cited Vox Day, a far-right activist, and, in a blog post, "entertained the idea that the Christchurch shooting might have been a "false flag operation" ".

In December 2020, United States president Donald Trump announced an intent to appoint Fulton Brown to the Cultural Property Advisory Committee, which the official White House website described as a "key administration post".

== Friendship with Milo Yiannopoulos ==
Brown first made contact with far-right figure Milo Yiannopoulos, when she sent him emails about the history of Christianity, the Crusades, and the righteousness of the West.

According to Jo Livingstone writing in The New Republic, Brown "Exploit[ed] the full freedom conferred upon her by tenure" to end a 2017 blog post defending Yiannopoulos, by referring to his critics as "spineless cunts" and "bullies". Brown wrote an article entitled An Establishment Conservative’s Guide to MILO for Breitbart News in 2017 and Breitbart republished an article by Brown about Yiannopoulos the same year. Her 2019 book, Milo Chronicles: Devotions 2016 - 2019, is about her friendship with Yiannopoulos.

== Personal life ==
Brown is married, plays the fiddle and is a fencer. She writes a blog titled Fencing Bear at Prayer.

== Bibliography ==
- From Judgment to Passion: Devotion to Christ and the Virgin Mary, 800–1200. 2005. ISBN 978-0231125512
- Mary and the Art of Prayer: The Hours of the Virgin in Medieval Christian Life and Thought. 2017. ISBN 978-0231181686
- Milo Chronicles: Devotions 2016 - 2019. 2019. ISBN 978-9527303573
- Centrism Games: A Modern Dunciad. 2021. ISBN 978-0578870816
- "A Packet for Rachel Fulton Brown". The University of Chicago Divinity School. 2 March 2017.
- Roll, Nick (18 September 2017). "A Schism in Medieval Studies, for All to See". Inside Higher Ed.
