= Leslie Marx =

American fencer

Personal information
- Born: April 24, 1967 (age 59) Fort Belvoir, Virginia, United States
- Education: Duke University (BA); Northwestern University (MA, PhD)
- Employer: Duke University

Sport
- Sport: Fencing
Medal record
Women's Epée
Representing United States
Veteran World Championships
Gold medal – first place	2026 Tbilisi	Vet-50 individual
Gold medal – first place	2026 Tbilisi	Team
Pan American Games
Gold medal – first place	1995 Mar del Plata	Individual
Gold medal – first place	1995 Mar del Plata	Team

Leslie Alice Marx (born April 24, 1967) is an American fencer and professor of economics at Duke University.

== Fencing ==
Marx competed in the women's individual and team épée events at the 1996 Summer Olympics. She won gold medals at the 1995 Pan American Games in the women's individual and team épée events. In 2017 Marx returned to international competition, winning the gold medal at the 2017 Veteran Fencing World Championships in the women's épée 50-59 event and in the team event.

== Research ==
Marx is the Robert A. Bandeen Professor of Economics at the Fuqua School of Business at Duke University. Her research topics include game theory and industrial organization. In particular, her work focuses on the problem of anti-competitive behavior by individuals and firms, including collusion, bid rigging, and anti-competitive contract provisions.

== See also ==
- List of USFA Division I National Champions
