= Ron Miller =

Ron Miller may refer to:

- Ron Miller (fencing coach) (1944-2023), head fencing coach at UNC, Chapel Hill
- Ron Miller (pole vaulter) (1929–2010), Canadian pole vaulter
- Ron W. Miller (1933–2019), American businessman, son-in-law of Walt Disney and CEO and president of Walt Disney Productions in the 1970s and 80s
- Ronald H. Miller (1938–2011), American author and a professor of religion at Lake Forest College
- Ron Miller (American football) (born 1939), American football player
- Ron Miller (artist and author) (born 1947), science fiction illustrator and writer, and administrator of the Bonestell Space Art
- Ron Miller (Pennsylvania politician) (born 1951), American politician from Pennsylvania
- Ronald F. Miller (born 1954), American politician and state senator in West Virginia
- Ron Miller (songwriter) (1932–2007), composer of such popular songs as "For Once In My Life" and "Yester Me, Yester You, Yester Day"
- Ronald Miller, Scottish geographer, president of the Royal Scottish Geographical Society, 1974–1977

== See also ==
- Ron Millar, computer game designer
- Ronald Millar (1919–1998), English actor, writer and dramatist
