= Colonel Thomas Hoyer Monstery =

American mercenary (1824–1901)

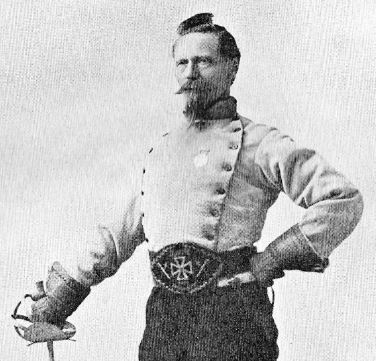
Colonel Thomas H. Monstery

Thomas Hoyer Monstery (born: Thomas Hoyer Mönster) (April 21, 1824 – December 31, 1901) was a Danish-American fencing and boxing instructor, duelist and soldier-of-fortune who fought in a number of Central and South American conflicts during the mid-19th century.

== Early life ==
Monstery was born in Copenhagen, Denmark. His father, Ole Michael Munster, had been an officer of the Danish Army but had been dismissed from service for having fought a duel; he was later pardoned, but banished from Denmark to serve as the Commandant of the Danish settlement of St. Croix, where he died twelve years later as the result of a lung injury sustained during the duel. Thomas' mother, Bergitha Christina Munster, was the daughter of Meta Anckarström, cousin to Jacob Johan Anckarström who had, in the year 1792, assassinated King Gustav III of Sweden.

At the age of twelve, in 1836, Thomas was enlisted as a cadet in the Danish navy, serving on the gunship Bellona and traveling to many foreign ports including Brazil, Russia, England and Portugal. After serving for three years he was injured during a fireworks accident on board ship and temporarily blinded; this injury caused him to lose his cadetship.

== Training in fencing and boxing ==
Upon regaining his eyesight he enrolled at the Military College at Copenhagen, where he remained for one year. He then attended at the Central Institute of Physical Culture in Stockholm, excelling in fencing, swimming, and other aspects of physical culture training. After four years of study at the Central Institute, he graduated a master-of-arms.

Coming into his inheritance at the age of eighteen, Monstery decided to pursue the specialized study of close combat, traveling to England where he studied boxing with William Thompson, better known by his professional name of Bendigo, and then to Hamburg, Germany where he continued his boxing training with an instructor named Liedersdorff. He continued to travel throughout Europe seeking instruction in various forms of fencing, including knife fighting in Spain and Italy.

== Military career ==
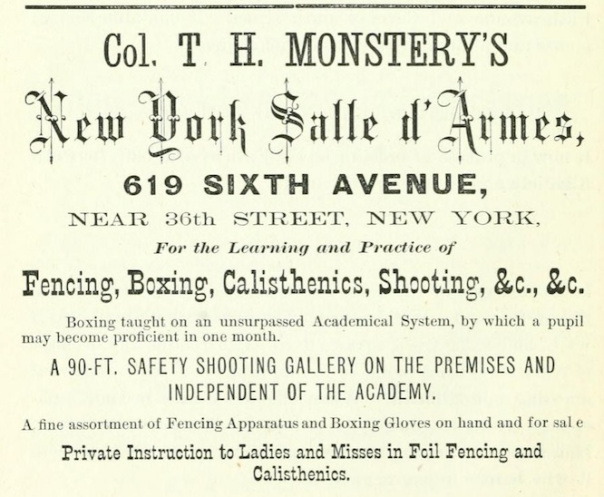
Advertisement for Monstery's salle d'armes

In 1845 Monstery accepted a commission as a fencing instructor to the Russian Army, but was forced to retire due to injury and moved to Copenhagen where he killed a man in a sword duel. Fleeing Denmark to avoid being arrested, he moved to Baltimore and then unsuccessfully attempted to gain a commission in the US Army as a bayonet and sabre fencing instructor. Enlisting in the US Navy he joined the crew of the gunboat Vixen and thus took part in General Scott's landing at Veracruz during the Mexican–American War.

Arriving in Baltimore in 1850, Monstery became a cigar-maker and successfully pursued this trade in several cities, eventually opening a fencing and boxing school as well. At this time he met and married a Cuban-American woman named Carmen Xiques. While based in Baltimore, Monstery had several confrontations with a street gang known as the Plug Uglies.

Moving to South America, he continued to work as a fencing instructor, teaching bayonet fencing to the Cuban Army until he caught Yellow Fever and lost that position. Upon recovering his health he took part in a revolution in Nicaragua and then continued to fight and/or to teach fencing to soldiers in various local conflicts, amassing a considerable fortune. In San Salvador he was given the nickname by which he became known throughout South America, El Rubio Bravo ("the Brave Blonde"). During this period of his life he was reported to have fought numerous duels with sword, knife and pistol. It was also in Latin America that Monstery attained the military rank of Colonel.

By 1859 he was based in Mexico, and in traveling from Chiapas to Mexico City he reported having been robbed of almost his entire fortune, estimated at $50,000. In the Autumn of 1860 he traveled to the West Indies to meet with his wife and they both re-located to California, settling in San Francisco where Monstery returned to the cigar business, continued his work as a fencing, boxing and swimming instructor and helped to found the Pioneer Athletic Club (later, the Olympic Club).

== Later life ==
In early 1867, Monstery traveled to Mexico and Cuba, challenging various local fencing masters to prize fights, before settling in New York City in 1870, where he maintained his various business interests and also continued to fight in challenge contests. He also held a number of high-profile events and Grand Assaults of Arms; the most popular of these was held at the lavish Lyceum Theatre on Fourteenth Street. He also opened a succession of fencing and boxing academies, training a number of prominent actors and martial artists in the arts of fencing and boxing. His most famous student was Ella Hattan, popularly known by her nom-de-guerre, Jaguarina. Hattan would reportedly go on to defeat more than sixty men on foot and horseback with the broadsword. Around 1884, Monstery moved to Chicago, where he spent his final years.

During the last decade of his life, Monstery developed cataracts, and had to retire from fencing. Thomas Hoyer Monstery died in Chicago, in 1901, at the age of seventy-seven. He was survived by his wife and by eight children.

== Writings on Self-Defense ==
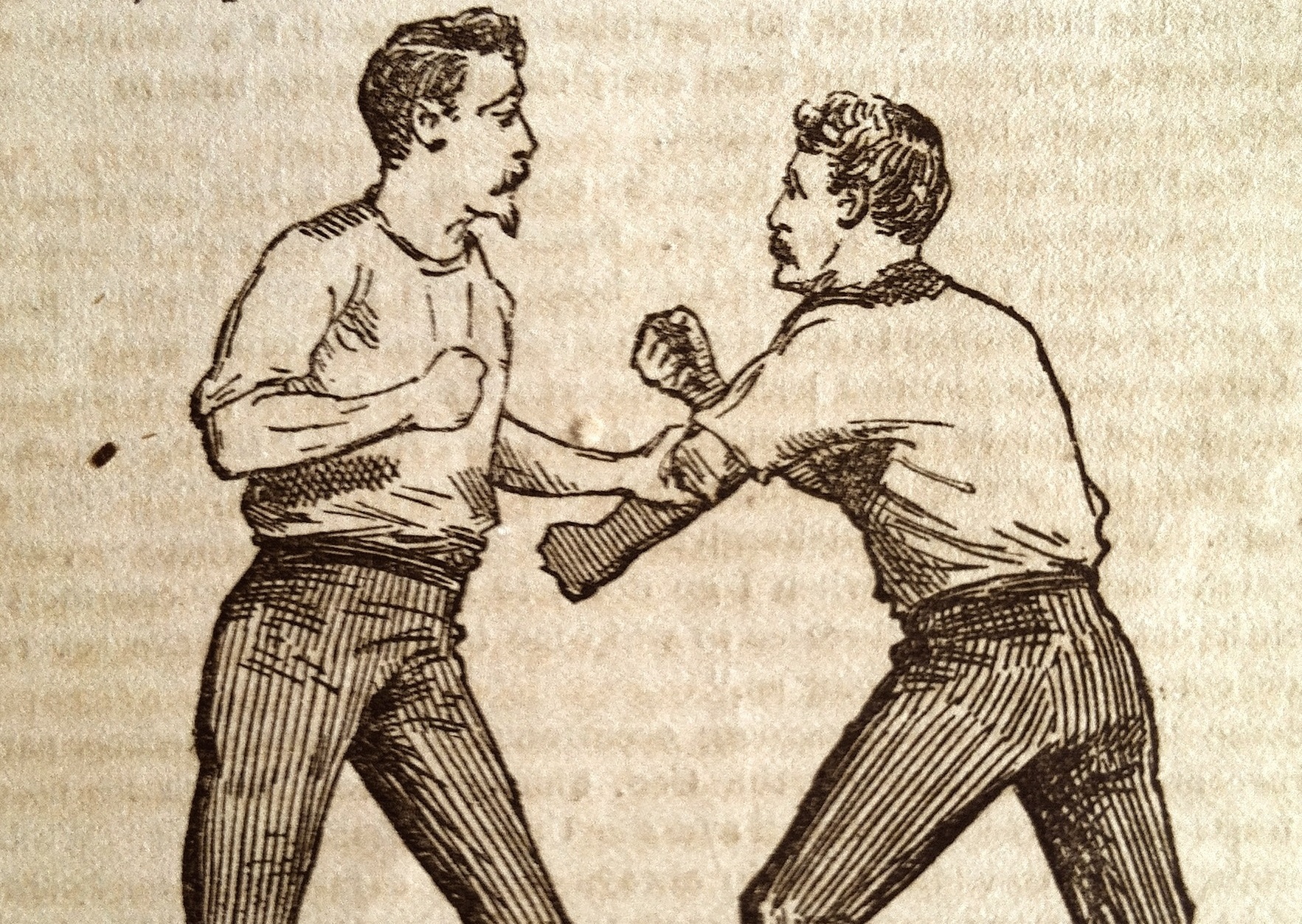
Monstery's boxing technique, 1878

In 1877 and 1878, while living in New York, Monstery published a number of articles on self-defense, treating of bare-knuckle boxing, kicking, grappling, and fencing with the cane and quarterstaff, and including defense against "rough and tumble" tactics and dirty tricks. Monstery wrote,

Every gentleman should be able to protect himself from insult and violence, with or without weapons...I teach the following tricks, not with any idea that they are to be used in friendly encounters with the gloves, but solely for the protection of gentlemen who may, at any time, against their will, be forced into an encounter with a street ruffian.

Monstery also offers a unique look into the Victorian-era fighting world, describing styles such as British "purring" (shin-kicking), Welsh jump-kicking, and American rough-and-tumble fighting. The armed section of Monstery's treatise begins with the cane, or hickory walking-stick, which he describes as "the proper companion of every gentleman"—good against knives, sword-canes, and even guns:

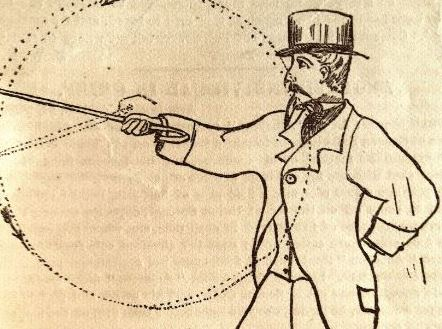
Monstery's cane self defense technique, 1878

Boxing will get a gentleman out of a great many scrapes into which he may fall, but in some parts of the Union he will come across men who habitually carry knives or pistols and in such a case a stout walking-stick, if he knows how to use it, may save his own life, and—what I consider more important—prevent the necessity of his taking the life of another...You cannot spare a man’s life with the pistol, and no generosity can be shown therewith. You must kill him or he kills you. With the cane it is different. Many are the pistols and knives that I have struck from the hands of men by a smart blow on the wrist with a cane, and many are the murderous brawls I have prevented in this way. As a queller of disturbances, I know of nothing better than a hickory or ash stick.

Monstery's subsequent technical section on the use of the two-handed quarterstaff is the first such treatise to be published during the nineteenth century, and the only one to be published in America prior to the twentieth century. Monstery also published rules for contests of boxing and fencing, criticizing those in use at the time. After fading into obscurity, Monstery's writings on self-defense were eventually republished during the twenty-first century under the title Self-Defense for Gentlemen and Ladies.

During the 1880s, Monstery also wrote or co-wrote a successful series of dime novel stories. In 2019, one of these semi-autobiographical novels, based on Monstery's experiences in Latin America, was republished with additional biographical information, under the title King of the Swordsmen.
