= Edgardo Rodríguez Juliá =

Puerto Rican writer (born 1946)

- Born: October 9, 1946 (age 79) Río Piedras, Puerto Rico
- Notable awards: Guggenheim Fellowship (1986)

Edgardo Rodríguez Juliá (born October 9, 1946) is a Puerto Rican essayist and novelist.

== Biography ==
Rodríguez Juliá was born in Río Piedras, Puerto Rico. In 1974, he published the first of his eight novels, La renuncia del héroe Baltasar. In 1986 he received a Guggenheim Fellowship for Literature. Since 1999 he has been a member of the Academia Puertorriqueña de la Lengua Española. In June 2011, he lectured at the University of Guadalajara's "Julio Cortázar" Center for the Study of American Literature. In April 2012 he gave the Raimundo Lira Lecture at Harvard University.

== Bibliography ==
- La renuncia del héroe Baltasar (1974) (published in English as The Renuciation in 1997 by Four Walls Eight Windows, Andrew Hurley, translator)
- Las tribulaciones de Jonás (1981)
- El entierro de Cortijo (1982–1983) (published in a bilingual English-Spanish edition as Cortijo's Wake in 2004 by Duke University Press, Juan Flores, translator)
- La noche oscura del niño Avilés (1984)
- Una noche con Iris Chacón (1986)
- Campeche o los diablejos de la melancolía (1986)
- Puertorriqueños: Álbum de la sagrada familia puertorriqueña a partir de 1898 (1988)
- El cruce de la Bahía de Guánica: cinco crónicas playeras y un ensayo (1989)
- Cámara Secreta: ensayos apócrifos y relatos verosímiles de la fotografía erótica (1994)
- El camino de Yyaloide (1994)
- Sol de medianoche (1995)
- Peloteros (1996)
- Cartagena (1997)
- Cortejos Fúnebres (1997)
- Elogio de la fonda (2001)
- Caribeños (2002)
- Mapa de una pasión literaria (2003)
- Mujer con Sombrero Panamá (2004)
- Musarañas de Domingo (2004)
- San Juan: Ciudad Soñada (2005) (published in English as San Juan: Memoir of a City in 2007 by University of Wisconsin Press, Peter Grandbois, editor; Antonio Skármeta, introduction)
- La nave del olvido (2009)
- El espíritu de la luz (2010)
- La piscina (2012)
- Mapa desfigurado de la Literatura Antillana (2012)
- Breve historia de mi tiempo urbano (2015)
- Tres vidas ejemplares del Santurce antiguo (2018)
- El béisbol romántico (2019)
- Pandemónium (2022)
- Retratos de machina: palimpsesto: manuscrito antiguo que conserva las huellas de una escritura anterior borrada artificialmente (2022)
- Dos señores muy viejos con alas enormes (2022)
- ¿Quién mató a Elena Ruz? (2023)

== See also ==
- List of Puerto Rican writers
- List of Puerto Ricans
- Puerto Rican literature
