= 2023 Veteran Fencing World Championships =

Fencing event in Daytona Beach, Florida, United States

- Dates: 11–16 October
- Host city: Daytona Beach, Florida, U.S
- Events: 24

The 2023 Veteran Fencing World Championships took place from 11 to 16 October 2023 in Daytona Beach, Florida, United States.

== Medals summary ==
=== Vet-50 ===
==== Men ====
Event	Gold	Silver	Bronze
Épée Individual	Jon M. Normile; United States	Emmanuel Peyret Lacombe; France	Akinori Katashima; Japan
Épée Individual	Jon M. Normile; United States	Emmanuel Peyret Lacombe; France	Claudio Pirani; Italy
Foil Individual	Cyril Lacroix; France	Nick Payne; Great Britain	Darko Limov; Croatia
Foil Individual	Cyril Lacroix; France	Nick Payne; Great Britain	Bertrand Beaurenault; France
Sabre Individual	Lorenzo Giacinto Morretta; Italy	Svend Berger; Germany	Hartmut Wrase; Germany
Sabre Individual	Lorenzo Giacinto Morretta; Italy	Svend Berger; Germany	Olivier Esquerre; France

==== Women ====
Event	Gold	Silver	Bronze
Épée Individual	Georgina Usher; Great Britain	Annica De Groote; Sweden	Abigail Nutt; Australia
Épée Individual	Georgina Usher; Great Britain	Annica De Groote; Sweden	Carole Charroy; France
Foil Individual	Julie T. Seal; United States	Jane P. Carter; United States	Larisa Salamandra; Individual Neutral Athletes
Foil Individual	Julie T. Seal; United States	Jane P. Carter; United States	Francesca Zurlo; Italy
Sabre Individual	Julie T. Seal; United States	Gunilla Graudins; Germany	Catherine Hori; France
Sabre Individual	Julie T. Seal; United States	Gunilla Graudins; Germany	Nicole Thome; Germany

=== Vet-60 ===
==== Men ====
Event	Gold	Silver	Bronze
Épée Individual	Jan Tivenius; Sweden	Gerhard Birkenmaier; Germany	Walter E. Dragonetti; United States
Épée Individual	Jan Tivenius; Sweden	Gerhard Birkenmaier; Germany	Herve Le Barbier; France
Foil Individual	Stephane Huerto; France	Adam Reynolds; Australia	Kenichi Umezawa; Japan
Foil Individual	Stephane Huerto; France	Adam Reynolds; Australia	John Troiano; Great Britain
Sabre Individual	Mark R. Lundborg; United States	Geza Kas; France	Steven D. Heck; United States
Sabre Individual	Mark R. Lundborg; United States	Geza Kas; France	Alberto Feira Chios; Italy

==== Women ====
Event	Gold	Silver	Bronze
Épée Individual	Frauke Hohlbein; Germany	Sarah Osvath; Australia	Lorraine Hoyne; Canada
Épée Individual	Frauke Hohlbein; Germany	Sarah Osvath; Australia	Gianna Cirillo; Italy
Foil Individual	Jenette Starks-Faulkner; United States	Astrid Kircheis; Germany	Gillian Worman; Great Britain
Foil Individual	Jenette Starks-Faulkner; United States	Astrid Kircheis; Germany	Anne-Marie Walters; United States
Sabre Individual	Lydia Fabry; United States	Robin J. Pernice; United States	Sylvie Zini; France
Sabre Individual	Lydia Fabry; United States	Robin J. Pernice; United States	Jane S. Hutchison; Great Britain

=== Vet-70 ===
==== Men ====
Event	Gold	Silver	Bronze
Épée Individual	Peter Osvath; Australia	Laszlo Imreh; Hungary	Jean-Louis Noel; France
Épée Individual	Peter Osvath; Australia	Laszlo Imreh; Hungary	Francois Gaudry; France
Foil Individual	Thoman W. Lutton; United States	Yutaka Yamazaki; Japan	Laszlo Imreh; Hungary
Foil Individual	Thoman W. Lutton; United States	Yutaka Yamazaki; Japan	Eiichi Ide; Japan
Sabre Individual	Joseph Streb; United States	Riccardo Carmina; Italy	Carl Morris; Great Britain
Sabre Individual	Joseph Streb; United States	Riccardo Carmina; Italy	Garik Gutman; United States

==== Women ====
Event	Gold	Silver	Bronze
Épée Individual	Elizabeth R. Kocab; United States	Marja-Liisa Tuulikki Someroja; Finland	Ibolya Hoffmann; Hungary
Épée Individual	Elizabeth R. Kocab; United States	Marja-Liisa Tuulikki Someroja; Finland	Charlotta Bowie; United States
Foil Individual	Iris Gardini; Italy	Brigitte Delacour; France	Judith A. Offerle; United States
Foil Individual	Iris Gardini; Italy	Brigitte Delacour; France	Marja-Liisa Tuulikki Someroja; Finland
Sabre Individual	Jane E. Eyre; United States	Jeannine M. Bender; United States	Silvia Brown; Great Britain
Sabre Individual	Jane E. Eyre; United States	Jeannine M. Bender; United States	Linda J. Dunn; United States

=== Vet-ABC ===
==== Men ====
Event	Gold	Silver	Bronze
Épée Team	United States; Joseph H. Deucher; Walter E. Dragonetti; Fredrick Frank; James L. Newsome; Jon M. Normile; Charles Schneider	Hungary; Robert Bardi; Attila Csajbok; Attila Csikos; Laszlo Imreh; Roland Kamany; Gyorgy Liptak	France; Antoine Chartier; Francois Gaudry; Herve Le Barbier; Gildas Le Treut; Francois Ringeissen; Francois Wacquez
Foil Team	France; Bertrand Beaurenault; Didier Contrepois; Stephane Huerto; Cyril Lacroix; Claude Le Monnier; Emmanuel Shapira	Italy; Marco Bosio; Riccardo Cramina; Fabio Di Russo; Fabio Miraldi; Filippo Pesce; Gianluca Ragg	Japan; Kenichi Hinoshita; Masayoshi Kondoh; Naoki Takeda; Kenichi Umezawa; Yutaka Yamazaki; Keiichiro Yokota
Sabre Team	United States; Stephen Dashnaw; Garik Gutman; Steven D. Heck; Mark R. Lundborg; Joseph Streb; Ronald J. Thornton	Italy; Riccardo Carmina; Oliver Emmerich; Luca Falaschi; Alberto Feira Chios; Fabrizio Filippi; Stefano Lanciotti	United Kingdom; Richard Cohen; Nicholas Fletcher; Julian Ghosh; Carl Morris; Roger Nickless; Edward Simpson

==== Women ====
Event	Gold	Silver	Bronze
Épée Team	Germany; Barbel Gorius; Frauke Hohlbein; Astrid Kircheis; Carolin Marheineke; Ute Schiffmann; Sonja Tippelt	Hungary; Monika Arnold; Judith Hendricks; Ibolya Hoffmann; Ernone Kolczonay	France; Corinne Aubailly; Carole Charroy; Myriam Malucelli; Annick Martin; Brigitte Martin; Florence Pagny
Foil Team	Italy; Elena Benucci; Gianna Cirillo; Iris Gardini; Marinella Garzini; Liqin Wei; Francesca Zurlo	United States; Jane P. Carter; Judith A. Offerle; Julie T. Seal; Jenette Starks-Faulkner; Deborah Theriault; Anne-Marie Walters	Germany; Margaretha Dresen-Kuchalski; Barbel Gorius; Astrid Kircheis; Hilke Kollmetz; Angelika Schramm; Silke Weltzien
Sabre Team	United States; Jeannine M. Bender; Frauke Berman; Jane E. Eyre; Lydia Fabry; Robin J. Pernice; Julie T. Seal	United Kingdom; Silvia Brown; Jacqueline Esimaje-Heath; Vanessa Hendra; Jane S. Hutchison; Michele Narey; Susan Uff	Italy; Maria Teresa Conconi; Iris Gardini; Marinella Garzini; Gabriella Lo Muzio; Nellina Minto; Rosangela Topatigh

== Medal table ==
* Host nation (United States)

Rank	Nation	Gold	Silver	Bronze	Total
1	United States*	13	4	7	24
2	France	3	3	10	16
3	Italy	3	3	5	11
4	Germany	2	4	3	9
5	Great Britain	1	2	6	9
6	Australia	1	2	1	4
7	Sweden	1	1	0	2
8	Hungary	0	3	2	5
9	Japan	0	1	4	5
10	Finland	0	1	1	2
11	Canada	0	0	1	1
11	Croatia	0	0	1	1
–	Individual Neutral Athletes	0	0	1	1
Totals (12 entries)		24	24	42	90
