= George Kolombatovich =

American fencing coach (1946–2018)

George Kolombatovich (August 29, 1946– September 19, 2018) was an American fencing Hall-of-Fame coach, referee, and former fencing master for the Metropolitan Opera.

== Biography ==
=== Early life ===
Kolombatovich was the son of Yugoslavian immigrant, Oscar, born in Flushing, Queens in 1946. He grew up fencing from the age of 5 at one point receiving instruction from world renown fencing master, Giorgio Santelli. He was a talented fencer in his own right winning many championships in his youth. He went on to fence for the NYU Violets for two years before joining the Army. His competitive career ended with a back injury caused by a car accident.

=== Coaching career ===
Kolombatovich spent a short time as an assistant fencing coach at NYU. This was before his hiring as an assistant coach for the Columbia Lions fencing team in 1978. The following year he took over as head coach. He would hold the position for 33 years becoming one of the longest tenured coaches in NCAA history. During his tenure his teams won 5 national championships producing 17 individual titles. Two fencers, Erinn Smart and James Leighman Williams, went on to win silver medals at the 2008 Summer Olympics.

=== Officiating career ===
Along with his prolific coaching career, Kolombatovich was an avid referee. He refereed at three olympic games, and was on the FIE officiating board from 2000 to 2008 including a stint as president. He revolutionized refereeing as he created a new grading system to judge referees, which is still used today.

=== Death ===
Kolombatovich died on September 19, 2018, in Sarasota, Florida, from acute respiratory distress syndrome.

== See also ==
- List of USFA Hall of Fame members
