= Ed Wright (fencer) =

American fencer

Personal information
- Born: July 21, 1949 Brooklyn, New York, U.S.
- Died: March 20, 2017 (aged 67) Cincinnati, Ohio, U.S.

Sport
- Sport: Fencing
- Coached by: Giorgio Santelli

Ed Wright (July 21, 1949 – March 20, 2017) was an American fencer. Wright started fencing at Boys High School in Brooklyn and continued at New York City Community College where he earned a degree in dental technology. He competed in the team foil event at the 1976 Summer Olympics. He taught fencing in Valley Cottage, New York and Cincinnati, Ohio.
