= List of USFA Hall of Fame members =

This is a list of the members of the United States Fencing Hall of Fame. The Hall of Fame itself is on display at the Museum of American Fencing, in Shreveport, Louisiana.

== 1963–1978 ==
Note: The USFA Hall of Fame Committee was disbanded in 1978. Individuals who are indicated as entered into the Hall of Fame before 1978 may have been entered in years other than those listed. The USFA Hall of Fame Committee was reinstated in 1996.

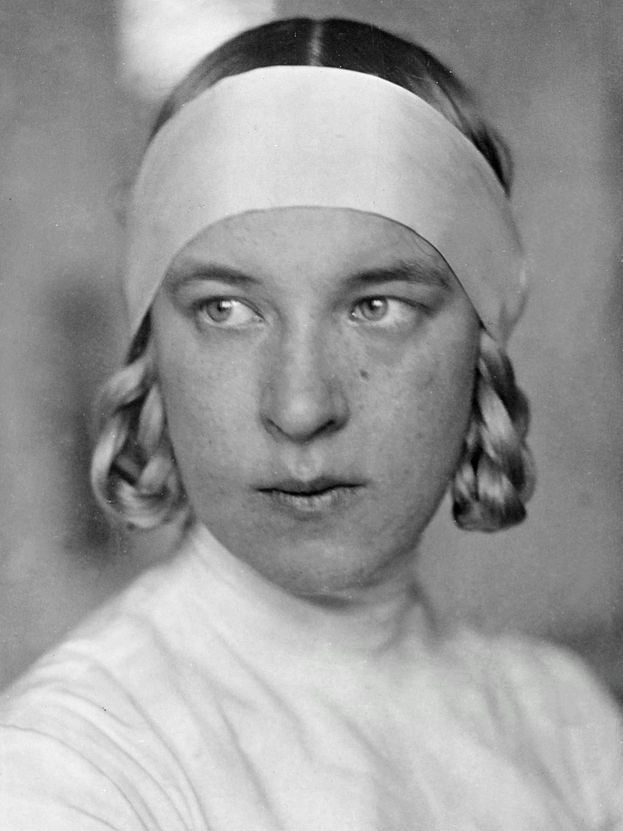
Helene Mayer

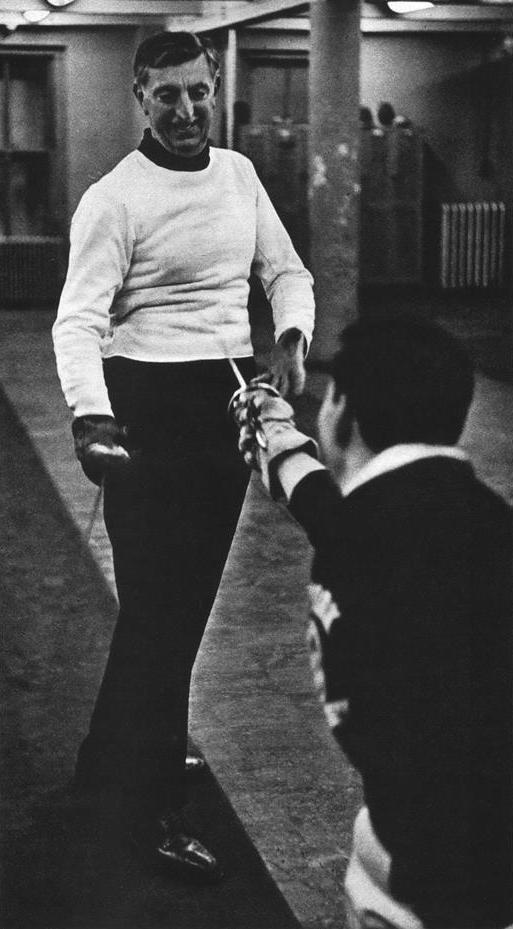
Giorgio Santelli

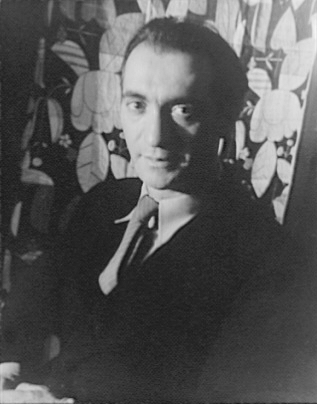
Nickolas Muray

1963

- Norman Armitage
- George Calnan
- Julio Castello
- Clovis Deladrier, coach for Navy
- Robert Grasson, fencing coach at Yale
- Sherman Hall
- Graeme Hammond
- John Huffman
- Joseph Levis
- Helene Mayer
- James Murray
- Leo Nunes
- William Scott O’Connor
- Joseph Brooks Bloodgood Parker
- John Sanford Saltus
- Giorgio Santelli
- Maria Cerra

1967

- Hugo Castello
- Lajos Csiszar
- Miguel de Capriles
- Irving DeKoff
- Andre Deladrier
- Maxwell Garret
- James Montague
- Stanley Sieja

Prior to 1974

- Dean Cetrulo
- José de Capriles
- Michael DeCicco
- Ralph Faulkner
- Ralph Goldstein
- Alvar Hermanson
- Tracy Jaeckel
- Edward Lucia
- Charles Schmitter

1974

- Albert Axelrod
- James Castello
- Dr. Samuel D’Ambola
- Istvan Danosi
- Dernell Every
- Julia Jones
- Norman Lewis
- Ray Miller
- Tibor Nyilas
- Rene Pinchart
- Nicholas Toth
- Joseph Vince
- George Worth

Prior to 1978

- Harriet King
- Maxine Mitchell
- Janice York Romary

1978

- John Allaire
- Henry Breckenridge
- Dr. Daniel Bukantz
- John Dimond
- Helena Mroczkowska Dow
- Warren Dow
- Csaba Elthes
- Jack Keane
- Nickolas Muray
- Frank Righeimer
- Thomas Sands
- Joseph Smith
- Harold Van Buskirk

== 1996–2000 ==
Note: The USFA Hall of Fame Committee was disbanded in 1978, and then was reinstated in 1996.

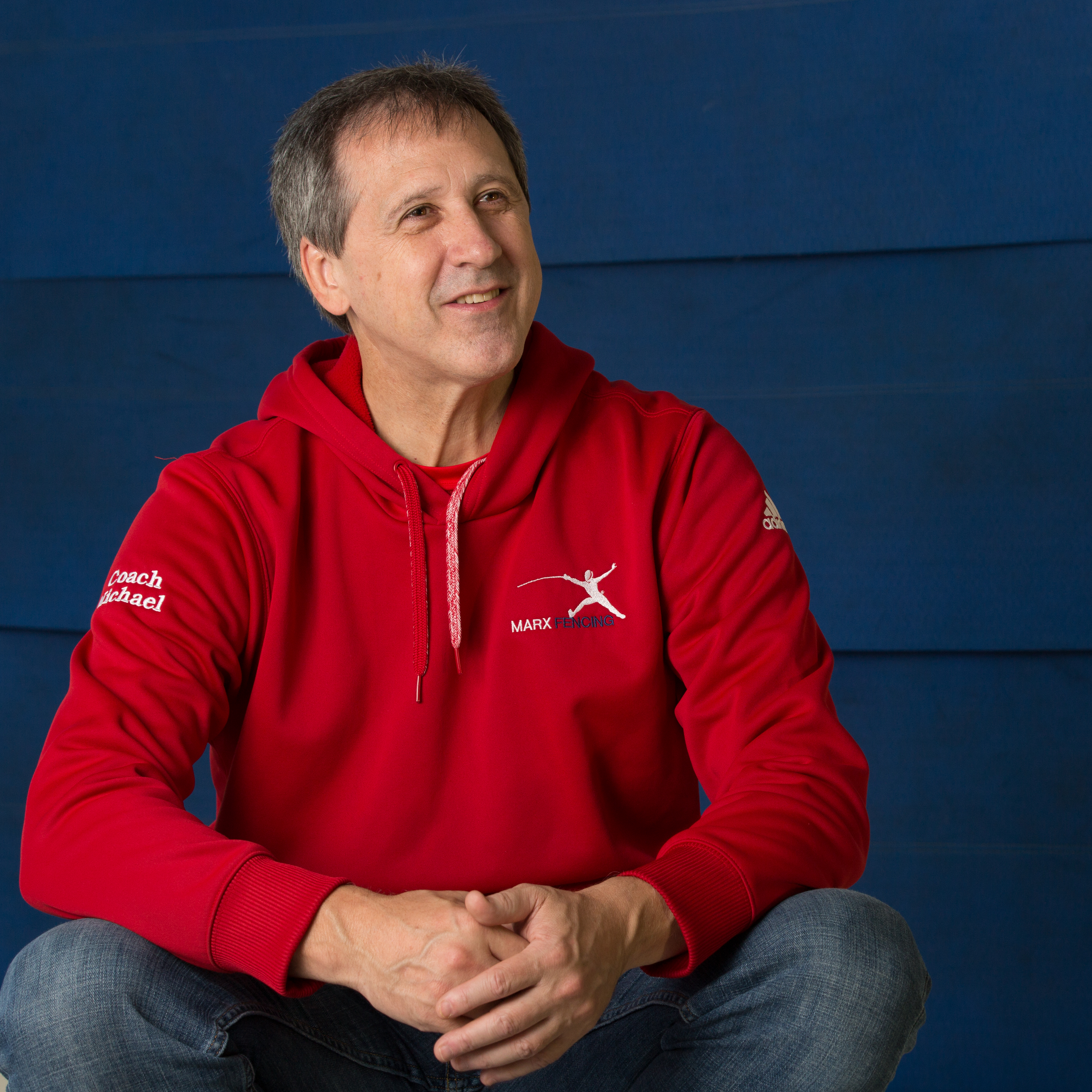
Michael Marx

1996

- Joseph Byrnes
- Joseph Pechinsky
- Peter Westbrook

1997

- Michael Marx
- Paul Pesthy
- Eleanor Turney

1998

- Irwin Bernstein
- Nikki Franke
- Albertson Van Zo Post

1999

- Vincent Bradford
- Marco La Tapette
- Alex Orban
- Aaron Van Wormer

2000

- Uriah Jones
- Jana Angelakis
- Odon Niederkirchner

== 2001–2005 ==
2001

- Jean-Jacques Gillet
- Donna Stone
- Dr. Ruth White
- Charles Bothner
- Mrs. Stuyvesant Fish
- Charles Tatham
- Joanna de Tuscan
- Allan Kwartler
- Neil Lazar

2002

- Caitlin Bilodeau
- Michael D'Asaro
- George Masin

2003

- Lee Shelley
- Denise O'Connor
- Eugene Hamori

2004

- Gay (Jacobsen) D'Asaro
- Heizaburo Okawa
- Steve Sobel
- Herb Spector

2005

- Nick Bravin
- Ed Richards
- Michael Lofton
- Abe Cohen

== 2006–present ==
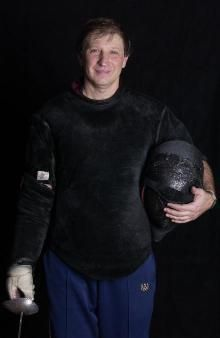
Yury Gelman

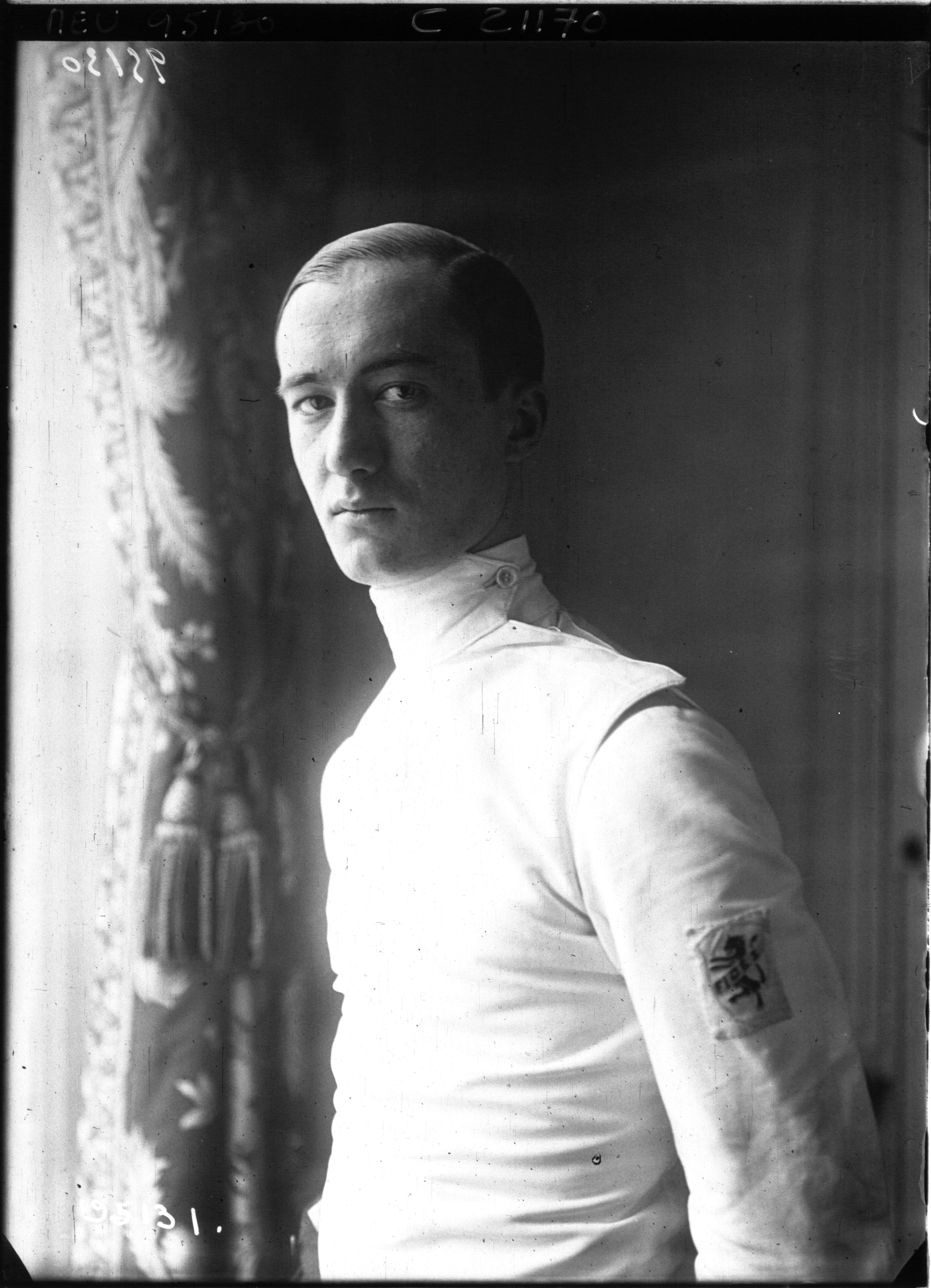
Aldo Nadi

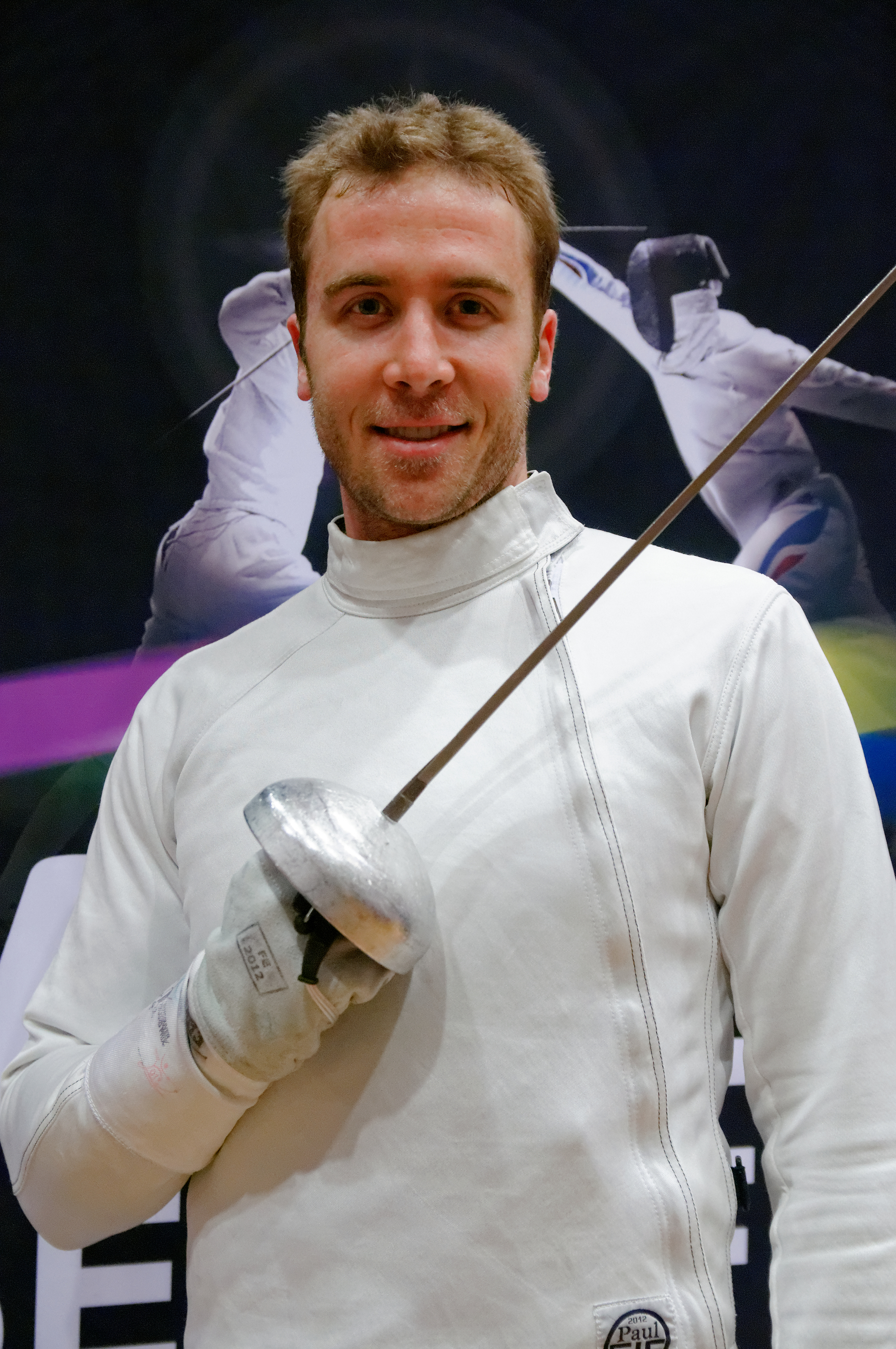
Soren Thompson

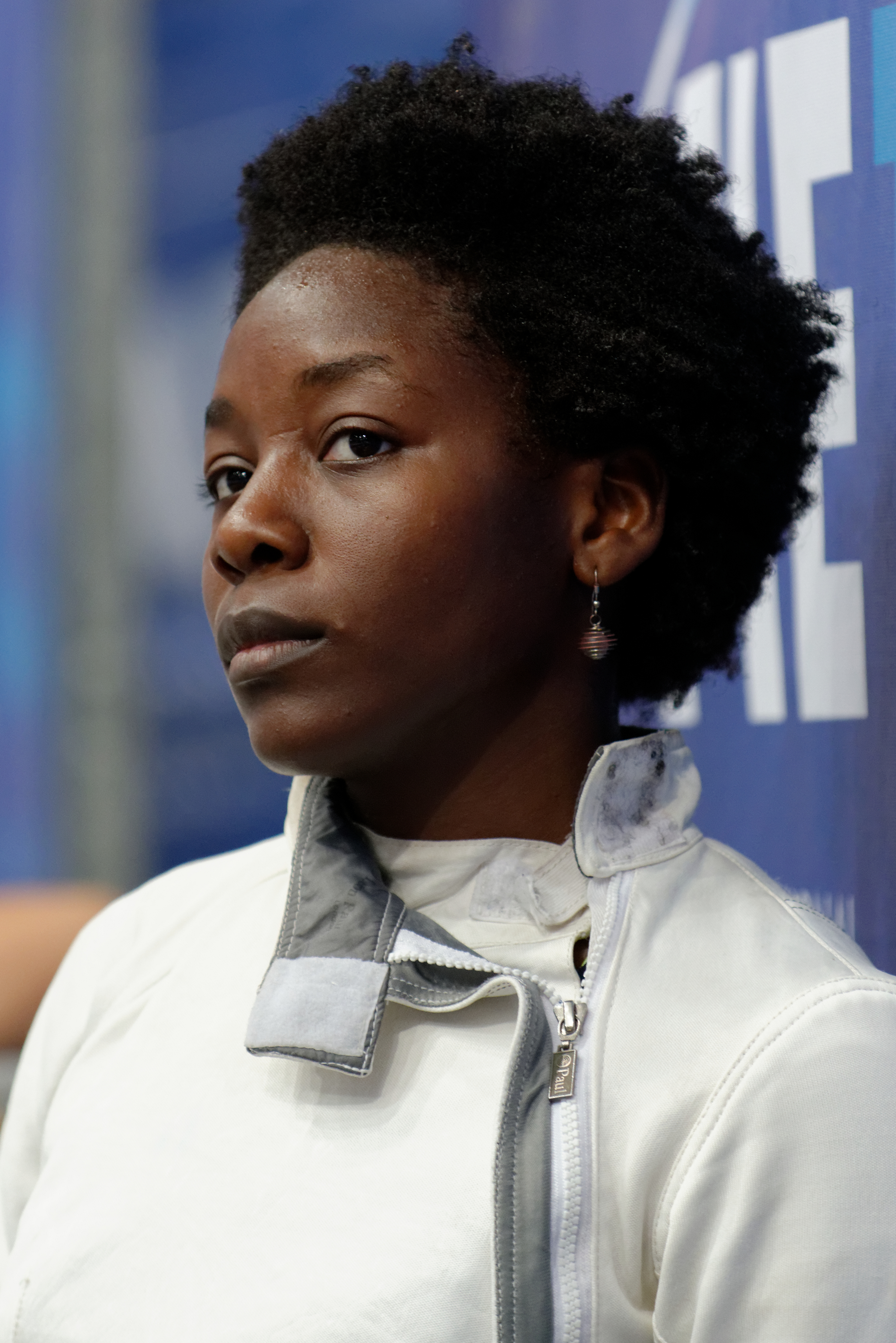
Maya Lawrence

2006

- Michel Alaux
- Gustave Heiss
- Mathilde Jagemann
- Aladar Kogler

2007

- August Anderson
- Yves Auriol
- Dan DeChaine
- Nat Goodhartz
- Dorothy Locke
- Alfred Sauer

2008

- Charles DeKay
- Charles Koch
- Ed Korfanty
- Cathy McClellan
- David Micahnik
- Carla-Mae Richards
- Regis Senac

2009

- Arkady Burdan
- Henry Harutunian
- Sherry Posthumus
- Gilbert Rosiere
- Jose Velarde

2010

- Hugh Alessandroni
- Robert Blum
- Fr Lawrence Calhoun
- Joseph Elliott
- Yuri Gelman
- Ella Hattan "La Jaguarina"
- Aldo Nadi

2011

- Arthur St Clair Lyon
- Tanya Adamovich
- Delmar Calvert
- Ann Marsh
- Stacey Johnson

2012

- Henri Uyttenhove
- Al Morales
- Ed Ballinger
- Sharon Monplaisir
- Carl Borack
- Felicia Zimmermann
- Skip Shurtz

2013

- Larry Anastasi
- Cliff Bayer
- Hans Halberstadt
- Buckie Leach
- Leonardo Terrone
- Iris Zimmermann

2014

- Ivan Lee (removed in 2025 after being banned for life by SafeSport)
- Richard Oles
- Erinn Smart
- Keeth Smart
- Edward Vebell
- Vladimir Nazlymov

2015

- Becca Ward
- Simon Gershon
- Marty Schneider
- Robert Cottingham
- Michel Sebastiani

2016

- Emily Cross
- Emily Jacobson
- Sada Jacobson
- Seth Kelsey
- Ted Li
- Les Stawicki

2017

- Molly Sullivan
- Greg Massialas
- Cody Mattern
- Emmanuil Kaidanov
- Eric Sollee
- George Kolombatovich

2018

- Ann O'Donnell (Russell)
- Soren Thompson
- Ro Sobalvarro
- George Breed

2019

- Paul Apostol
- Dan Kellner
- Jon Normile
- Rob Stull
- Jerzy Grzymski
- William Reith
- Jeff Wolfe

2020

- Gerald Cetrulo
- Steve Mormando
- Tony Orsi
- Akhi Spencer-El
- Justin Tausig

2021

- Jane Eyre
- Maya Lawrence
- Robert Marx
- Colleen Marx Olney
- Mikhail Petin

2023

- Ron Miller
- Branimir Zivkovic
- Sam Cheris
- Ed Donofrio
- Kamara James
- Sean McClain
- John Moreau
- Chris O'Loughlin
- Charlotte Remenyik
- Hanna Thompson

2024

- Joey Brinson
- Andrey Geva
- Harold Goldsmith
- Marty Lang
- Nat Lubell
- Stephen Netburn
- Nzingha Prescod

== See also ==
- Fencing
- List of American foil fencers
- List of American sabre fencers
