= Régis Sénac =

French fencer and instructor

Régis Sénac, famous French fencer and instructor, was the father of Louis Senac.

Sénac was an instructor of fencing for many years in the French army (Maître d'Armes in the Grande Impériale of France) before emigrating to the United States in 1872. He established a fencing school in 1874 in Broadway near Forty-third St., the "Salle d'Armes", in which his son Louis later succeeded him as director. On April 10, 1876 he won the fencing championship of America in a contest held at Tammany Hall, New York, along with 500 dollars.

In addition to his wide experience as an instructor, in France he participated in three duels and in each encounter was victorious, escaping without a single scratch, while each of his opponents was seriously disabled.

In his 1879 travel journal, Travels with a Donkey in the Cevennes, Robert Louis Stevenson mentions eating at an inn in Goudet, France where there is a portrait of Sénac, the host's nephew, billed as “Professor of Fencing and Champion of the Two Americas”.

== See also ==
- List of USFA Hall of Fame members
