= Thomas J. Sands =

American fencer

Personal information
- Born: August 2, 1907 Dayton, Ohio, United States
- Died: November 5, 1984 (aged 77) Cornwall-on-Hudson, New York, United States
- Resting place: West Point Cemetery, West Point, New York

Sport
- Sport: Fencing

Thomas Jahn Sands (August 2, 1907 – November 5, 1984) was an American fencer. He competed in the team épée event at the 1936 Summer Olympics.

A career officer in the United States Army, he attained the rank of major general.

== See also ==
- List of USFA Hall of Fame members
