= Joey Brinson =

American wheelchair fencer

Personal information
- Nationality: United States
- Born: 1976 (age 49–50) Jackson, Mississippi
- Height: 5 ft 9 in (1.75 m)
Medal record
Athletics
Various
Bronze medal – third place	2011 U.S. Fencing National Wheelchair Championship	Men's épée fencing
Bronze medal – third place	2011 U.S. Fencing National Wheelchair Championship	Men's sabre fencing
Bronze medal – third place	2011 Parapan American Games	Men's épée fencing
Silver medal – second place	2011 Parapan American Games	Men's foil fencing
Bronze medal – third place	2012 North American Cup	Men's sabre fencing
Gold medal – first place	2012 U.S. Fencing National Wheelchair Championship	Men's sabre fencing
Silver medal – second place	2012 U.S. Fencing National Wheelchair Championship	Men's épée fencing

Joey Brinson is an American wheelchair fencer.

== Biography ==
Brinson was born in 1976 in Jackson, Mississippi. He became paralyzed after a car accident at the age of 17. He was got interested in a sport in 2006 when a Methodist Rehabilitation Center in his home city added fencing as a part of their sports program for disabled individuals. In 2007, he was one of the founders of Blade Rollers, a fencing team supported by MRC. He won bronze medals in both épée and sabre at U.S. Fencing National Wheelchair Championship in 2011 and the same year won another bronze for épée and a silver one for foil at Parapan American Games. In 2012 he won a bronze medal in sabre at the North American Cup, and the same year got a gold one for the same thing, and a silver one for épée at the 2012 U.S. Fencing National Wheelchair Championship.

== See also ==
- List of USFA Hall of Fame members
