= 2025 Veteran Fencing World Championships =

- Dates: 12–20 November
- Host city: Manama, Bahrain
- Events: 36

The 2025 Veteran Fencing World Championships took place from 12 to 20 November 2025 in Manama, Bahrain.

== Medals summary ==
=== Vet-40 ===
==== Men ====
Event	Gold	Silver	Bronze
Épée Individual	Federico Bollati; Italy	Sebastien Amstutz; Switzerland	Nicolas Coruble; France
Épée Individual	Federico Bollati; Italy	Sebastien Amstutz; Switzerland	Alexander Tsinis; United States
Foil Individual	Ugo Balestrieri; Italy	Michael Stanek; Germany	Jean Francois Sigouin; Canada
Foil Individual	Ugo Balestrieri; Italy	Michael Stanek; Germany	Jessy Bernal; France
Sabre Individual	Georgii Kirnosov; Individual Neutral Athletes	Alexander Weber; Argentina	Helmar Burkhardt; Germany
Sabre Individual	Georgii Kirnosov; Individual Neutral Athletes	Alexander Weber; Argentina	Marc Andreu; Spain

==== Women ====
Event	Gold	Silver	Bronze
Épée Individual	Holly Buechel; United States	Julia Ashchuk; Individual Neutral Athletes	Martina Reumueller; Austria
Épée Individual	Holly Buechel; United States	Julia Ashchuk; Individual Neutral Athletes	Regula Mueller; Switzerland
Foil Individual	Marta Cammilletti; Italy	Andrea Bernat; Hungary	Julie Grassin; France
Foil Individual	Marta Cammilletti; Italy	Andrea Bernat; Hungary	Christina Kaneshige; United States
Sabre Individual	Rabea Hambach-Richter; Germany	Giselle Martinez Elizalde; Mexico	Annaick Ferrari; France
Sabre Individual	Rabea Hambach-Richter; Germany	Giselle Martinez Elizalde; Mexico	Kathryn Pierrynowski; United States

=== Vet-50 ===
==== Men ====
Event	Gold	Silver	Bronze
Épée Individual	Aleksander Atanassow; Poland	Carlos Enrique Covani; Argentina	Alexander Truetzschler; Germany
Épée Individual	Aleksander Atanassow; Poland	Carlos Enrique Covani; Argentina	Mehmet Tepedelenlioglu; United States
Foil Individual	Filippo Pesce; Italy	Dmitrii Sirenko; Individual Neutral Athletes	Cyril Lacroix; France
Foil Individual	Filippo Pesce; Italy	Dmitrii Sirenko; Individual Neutral Athletes	Bertrand Beaurenault; France
Sabre Individual	Atanas Arnaudov; Bulgaria	Dmitrii Kustov; Individual Neutral Athletes	Marcin Ganszczyk; Poland
Sabre Individual	Atanas Arnaudov; Bulgaria	Dmitrii Kustov; Individual Neutral Athletes	Taras Kashinskiy; Individual Neutral Athletes

==== Women ====
Event	Gold	Silver	Bronze
Épée Individual	Kristin Foellmer; United States	Natalya Goncharova; Kazakhstan	Florence Pagny; France
Épée Individual	Kristin Foellmer; United States	Natalya Goncharova; Kazakhstan	Georgina Usher; Great Britain
Foil Individual	Julie Seal; United States	Martina Ganassin; Italy	Marielle Goemaere; France
Foil Individual	Julie Seal; United States	Martina Ganassin; Italy	Francesca Zurlo; Italy
Sabre Individual	Costanza Drigo; Italy	Daniela Colaiacomo; Italy	Dorothea Tanzmeister; Austria
Sabre Individual	Costanza Drigo; Italy	Daniela Colaiacomo; Italy	Julie Seal; United States

=== Vet-60 ===
==== Men ====
Event	Gold	Silver	Bronze
Épée Individual	Robert Bardi; Hungary	Marco Longo; Germany	Gerald Hinz; Germany
Épée Individual	Robert Bardi; Hungary	Marco Longo; Germany	Riccardo Bonsignore Zanghi'; Italy
Foil Individual	Pascal Jolyot; France	Igor Tarasov; Individual Neutral Athletes	Fabio Miraldi; Italy
Foil Individual	Pascal Jolyot; France	Igor Tarasov; Individual Neutral Athletes	Christian Dousse; Switzerland
Sabre Individual	George Matt; United States	Alberto Feira Chios; Italy	Val Kizik; United States
Sabre Individual	George Matt; United States	Alberto Feira Chios; Italy	Aleh Pimenau; Netherlands

==== Women ====
Event	Gold	Silver	Bronze
Épée Individual	Carolin Marheineke; Germany	Rosa Maria Cano Diosa; Spain	Amy Montoya; United States
Épée Individual	Carolin Marheineke; Germany	Rosa Maria Cano Diosa; Spain	Carole Poncelet; France
Foil Individual	Magda Melandri; Italy	Georgina Love; United States	Liqin Wei; Italy
Foil Individual	Magda Melandri; Italy	Georgina Love; United States	Eniko Palotai; Hungary
Sabre Individual	Lydia Fabry; United States	Robin Pernice; United States	Du Min Yi; Australia
Sabre Individual	Lydia Fabry; United States	Robin Pernice; United States	Michele Narey; Great Britain

=== Vet-70 ===
==== Men ====
Event	Gold	Silver	Bronze
Épée Individual	Jean Stock; Belgium	Giuliano Pianca; Italy	Daryl Taylor; United States
Épée Individual	Jean Stock; Belgium	Giuliano Pianca; Italy	William Anton Pollard; Great Britain
Foil Individual	Paul Wedge; Great Britain	Laszlo Imreh; Hungary	Graham Paul; Great Britain
Foil Individual	Paul Wedge; Great Britain	Laszlo Imreh; Hungary	Henri Darricau; United States
Sabre Individual	Joseph Streb; United States	Jacaeber Kastor; United States	Giulio Paroli; Italy
Sabre Individual	Joseph Streb; United States	Jacaeber Kastor; United States	Garik Gutman; United States

==== Women ====
Event	Gold	Silver	Bronze
Épée Individual	Astrid Kircheis; Germany	Dagmar Heinzelmann; Germany	Ernone Kolczonay; Hungary
Épée Individual	Astrid Kircheis; Germany	Dagmar Heinzelmann; Germany	Jennette Starks-Faulkner; United States
Foil Individual	Jennette Starks-Faulkner; United States	Kaoru Amari; Japan	Marja-Liisa Tuulikki Someroja; Finland
Foil Individual	Jennette Starks-Faulkner; United States	Kaoru Amari; Japan	Anne-Marie Walters; United States
Sabre Individual	Heidi Runyan; United States	Yoshiko Chikubu; Japan	Jennette Starks-Faulkner; United States
Sabre Individual	Heidi Runyan; United States	Yoshiko Chikubu; Japan	Kaoru Amari; Japan

=== Vet-ABC ===
==== Men ====
Event	Gold	Silver	Bronze
Épée Team	France; Francois Wacquez; Ludovic Lesne; Nicolas Coruble; Julien Lombard; François Pawlaczyk	United States; Vadim Makmatov; Andrew Prihodko; Mehmet Tepedelenlioglu; Alexander Tsinis; Kyle Yamasaki	Italy; Federico Bollati; Gabriele Vincenzi; Antonio Robecchi Mainardi; Mattia Pedone; Claudio Pirani
Foil Team	France; Bertrand Beaurenault; Cyril Lacroix; Franck Malachenko; Jessy Bernal; Eric Trepo	Italy; Ugo Balestrieri; Jacopo Inverardi; Fabio Di Russo; Filippo Pesce; Lorenzo Richiardi	United States; Stephen Jan; Pai Dong-Ying; Leonid Popokh; Rafael Suarez; Alexander Wood
Sabre Team	Individual Neutral Athletes; Leonid Davydov; Taras Kashinskiy; Georgii Kirnosov; Dmitrii Kustov; Dmitrii Papsuev	Italy; Francesco Gallavotti; Camillo Matrigali; Lorenzo Giacinto Morretta; Roberto Napoli; Jacopo Spilimbergo	United States; Joshua Bush; Pietro Ferraro; Joseph Greene; Kim Phillips; Ronald Thornton

==== Women ====
Event	Gold	Silver	Bronze
Épée Team	United Kingdom; Susann Altkemper; Lindsay Bottoms; Kathryn Reed; Georgina Usher; Jayne Ward	United States; Christina Kaneshige; Holly Buechel; Kristin Foellmer; Heidi Chang; Sandra Marchant	France; Florence Pagny; Sandra Laisney; Rachel Le Breton; Pascale Ergand; Lia Chevalier
Foil Team	Italy; Marta Cammilletti; Martina Ganassin; Elena Benucci; Francesca Zurlo; Paola Quadri	Individual Neutral Athletes; Inessa Rodionova; Larisa Salamandra; Elena Mazina; Zarina Tilliakhodzhaeva; Svetlana Kalatina	United States; Morgane Bhatt; Jane Carter; Inga Cho; Christina Kaneshige; Julie Seal
Sabre Team	Germany; Gunilla Graudins; Nicole Thome; Katalin Di Martino; Christina Mazzola; Rabea Hambach-Richter	Italy; Martina Ganassin; Costanza Drigo; Veronica De Cicco; Martina Gianecchini; Daniela Colaiacomo	France; Catherine Hori; Annaick Ferrari; Claire Brisson; Lovely Malinur; Karine Garcia-Lojek

=== Grand Vet-ABC ===
==== Men ====
Event	Gold	Silver	Bronze
Épée Team	Germany; Achim Bellmann; Gerald Hinz; Volker Fischer; Marco Longo; Gerd Oswald	Italy; Giuliano Pianca; Giuseppe Marino; Luca Magni; Umberto Spano; Riccardo Bonsignore Zanghi'	Hungary; Laszlo Imreh; Karoly Szalay; Gabor Horvath; Attila Csikos; Robert Bardi
Foil Team	Italy; Michele De Santis; Maurizio Galvan; Francesco Tiberi; Marco Bosio; Fabio Miraldi	Individual Neutral Athletes; Vasiliy Mishagin; Gari Aftandilov; Valery Zogiy; Igor Tarasov; Vladimir Chikin	United Kingdom; Paul Abrahams; Marvin Evans; Jeffrey Kiy; Graham Paul; Paul Wedge
Sabre Team	Italy; Giulio Paroli; Enrico Antinoro; Riccardo Carmina; Alberto Feira Chios; Luca Falaschi	United States; William Becker; Jacaeber Kastor; Val Kizik; George Matt; Joseph Streb	Poland; Andrzej Mainka; Piotr Juszkiewicz; Wojciech Ossowski; Leszek Gajda; Michal Zablocki

==== Women ====
Event	Gold	Silver	Bronze
Épée Team	Germany; Frauke Hohlbein; Astrid Kircheis; Angela Kummich; Carolin Marheineke; Halka Tuchen	France; Valerie Namuroy; Pascale Appavoupoulle; Carole Poncelet; Corinne Aubailly; Annick Martin	United States; Valerie Asher; Suzanne Bloomer; Charlotta Bowie; Amy Montoya; Jennette Starks-Faulkner
Foil Team	United States; Rachel Brown; Georgina Love; Jennette Starks-Faulkner; Anne-Marie Walters; Lynnette Whitt	Italy; Iris Gardini; Gianna Cirillo; Magda Melandri; Franca Col Maria; Liqin Wei	United Kingdom; Jennifer Morris; Caron Hale; Gillian Worman; Susan Uff; Sheila Anderson
Sabre Team	United States; Lydia Fabry; Judith Offerle; Robin Pernice; Heidi Runyan; Jennette Starks-Faulkner	Italy; Iris Gardini; Maria Teresa Conconi; Antonella Parpaiola; Margherita Camerin; Rosangela Topatigh	United Kingdom; Jane Hutchison; Jennifer Morris; Silvia Brown; Michele Narey; Louise Walker

== Medal table ==
* Host nation (Bahrain)

Rank	Nation	Gold	Silver	Bronze	Total
1	United States	10	6	17	33
2	Italy	9	10	6	25
3	Germany	6	3	3	12
4	France	3	1	11	15
5	Individual Neutral Athletes	2	6	1	9
6	Great Britain	2	0	7	9
7	Hungary	1	2	3	6
8	Poland	1	0	2	3
9	Belgium	1	0	0	1
9	Bulgaria	1	0	0	1
11	Japan	0	2	1	3
12	Argentina	0	2	0	2
13	Switzerland	0	1	2	3
14	Spain	0	1	1	2
15	Kazakhstan	0	1	0	1
15	Mexico	0	1	0	1
17	Austria	0	0	2	2
18	Australia	0	0	1	1
18	Canada	0	0	1	1
18	Finland	0	0	1	1
18	Netherlands	0	0	1	1
Totals (21 entries)		36	36	60	132
