= Peter Grandbois =

Personal information
- Nationality: American
- Born: April 3, 1964 (age 62) Minneapolis, MN
- Website: www.petergrandbois.com
Medal record
Men's foil
Representing United States
Veteran World Championships
| Silver medal – second place | 2024 Dubai | Team |

Peter Grandbois (born April 3, 1964) is an American writer, editor, academic, fencer and fencing coach.

== Biography ==
Peter Grandbois received a B.A. from the University of Colorado—Boulder (1986, cum laude), an M.A. from the University of Colorado—Boulder (1991), an M.F.A. from Bennington College (2003), and a Ph.D. from the University of Denver (2006). He was an assistant professor at Sacramento State University for four years before taking a position at Denison University in 2010 where he is currently a professor of creative writing and contemporary literature. He is the Poetry Editor for Boulevard magazine.

He is also the head coach of the Denison University Men's and Women's Fencing Teams. They compete in the Central Collegiate Fencing Conference.

== Writing ==
Known for his work in all four genres, Grandbois is the author of five poetry collections, three novels, four novella collections or "double monster features," two memoirs, two collections of short stories, and several plays produced in New York, Los Angeles, St. Louis, and Columbus. His poems, short stories, essays, and reviews have appeared in numerous journals and magazines, including: Boulevard, The Denver Quarterly, The Gettysburg Review, The Kenyon Review, The Normal School, North Dakota Quarterly, and Prairie Schooner.

== Awards ==
- Winner of the 2020 Snyder Prize from Ashland Poetry Press for Last Night I Aged a Hundred Years
- Finalist for the 2019 Foreword INDIES in the category of Best Multicultural Fiction for half-burnt
- Notable Essay in The Best American Essays 2019 for "Pain," which first appeared in Broad Street
- Notable Essay in The Best American Essays 2018 for "Passion," which first appeared in Mount Hope
- Honorable Mention for the 2017 Foreword INDIES in the Poetry category for This House That
- Notable Essay in The Best American Essays 2017 for "Honor," which first appeared in the North Dakota Quarterly.
- The Woman Who Was Me, nominated for five New York Innovative Theatre Awards, including: Outstanding Premiere Production of a Play and Outstanding Solo Performance, 2017
- Winner of the Brighthorse Books Poetry Prize, 2016 for This House That
- Silver Medal for the 2015 Foreword IndieFab Awards (now known as the Foreword INDIES) in the Fantasy category for The Girl on the Swing and At Night in Crumbling Voices
- Ohio Arts Council Award, 2015
- Honorable Mention in Best American Horror, volume 7, ed. by Ellen Datlow, for "The Stability of Large Systems," 2015
- Honorable Mention for the 2014 Foreword IndieFab Awards (now known as the Foreword INDIES) in the Fantasy category for The Glob Who Girdled Granville and The Secret Lives of Actors
- Winner of the Neil Labute New Theatre Festival, St. Louis, 2013, for "Present Tense" (Co-written with Nancy Bell)
- Finalist for the 2013 Foreword Book of the Year Awards (now known as the Foreword INDIES) in the Short Stories category for Domestic Disturbances
- Gold Medal for the 2011 Foreword Book of the Year Awards (now known as the Foreword INDIES) in the Literary Fiction category for Nahoonkara
- Notable Essay in The Best American Essays 2011 for "Driving to Puerto Rico," which first appeared in The Potomac Review.
- Honorable Mention, the Pushcart Prize 2007 for "All or Nothing at the Faberge," which first appeared in Post Road.
- Selected for the Barnes and Noble "Discover Great New Writer's Program" in 2006 for The Gravedigger.

== Bibliography ==
=== Poetry ===
- This House That (Brighthorse Books, 2017)
- The Three-Legged World—published as Triptych with books by the poets James McCorkle and Robert Miltner (Etruscan Press, 2020)
- everything has become birds (Brighthorse Books, 2021)
- Last Night I Aged a Hundred Years (Ashland Poetry Press, 2021)
- Story of a Pilgrim (Tiger Bark Press, 2026)

=== Novels ===
- The Gravedigger (Chronicle books, 2006)
- Nahoonkara (Etruscan Press, 2011)
- half-burnt (Spuyten Duyvil, 2019)

=== Novella collections ===
- Wait Your Turn and The Stability of Large Systems (Wordcraft of Oregon, 2014)
- The Glob Who Girdled Granville and The Secret Lives of Actors (Wordcraft of Oregon, 2014)
- The Girl on the Swing and At Night in Crumbling Voices (Wordcraft of Oregon, 2015)
- Cat People and Dream Memories of the Fifty Foot Woman (Spuyten Duyvil, 2025)

=== Memoir ===
- The Arsenic Lobster: A Hybrid Memoir (Spuyten Duyvil, 2009)
- Kissing the Lobster (Spuyten Duyvil, 2018)

=== Short story collections ===
- Domestic Disturbances (Subito Press, 2013)
- Domestic Bestiary (Spuyten Duyvil, 2023)

=== Plays ===
- Mutual Consent—cowritten with Nancy Bell (California Repertory Theatre, Long Beach, CA, 2016
- The Woman Who Was Me (New York, United Solo Theatre Festival, 2014; United Solo Theatre Festival, 2015, Naropa University, Boulder, CO, 2016, and Theatre Lab, New York: 2017)
- "Present Tense"—a One Act—cowritten with Nancy Bell (St. Louis Actor's Studio, Neil Labute Festival, 2013; The Best of the Neil Labute New Theatre Festival, 59E59 Theatre in New York, 2016)
- "The Call"—a One Act—cowritten with Nancy Bell (MadLab: Columbus, OH 2013;

=== Translations ===
- San Juan: Memoir of a City, by Edgardo Rodriguez Julia (University of Wisconsin, 2007)
