= 2024 Veteran Fencing World Championships =

Fencing championships in Saudi Arabia

- Dates: 11–17 October
- Host city: Dubai, United Arab Emirates
- Events: 24

The 2024 Veteran Fencing World Championships took place from 11 to 17 October 2024 in Dubai, United Arab Emirates.

== Medals summary ==
=== Vet-50 ===
==== Men ====
Event	Gold	Silver	Bronze
Épée Individual	Francois Wacquez; France	Emmanuel Peyret Lacombe; France	Raphael Crespelle; France
Épée Individual	Francois Wacquez; France	Emmanuel Peyret Lacombe; France	Tobias Lee; United States
Foil Individual	Cyril Lacroix; France	Nicolas Piofret; France	Darko Limov; Croatia
Foil Individual	Cyril Lacroix; France	Nicolas Piofret; France	Rafael A. Suarez C. United States
Sabre Individual	Oliver Emmerich; Italy	Stefano Lanciotti; Italy	Phillips Kim; United States
Sabre Individual	Oliver Emmerich; Italy	Stefano Lanciotti; Italy	Ronald Thornton; United States

==== Women ====
Event	Gold	Silver	Bronze
Épée Individual	Georgina Usher; Great Britain	Gianna Hablutzel-Burki; Switzerland	Annalisa Avancini; Italy
Épée Individual	Georgina Usher; Great Britain	Gianna Hablutzel-Burki; Switzerland	Pia Albertson; Sweden
Foil Individual	Inessa Rodionova; Individual Neutral Athletes	Hilke Kollmetz; Germany	Valerie Preaux; France
Foil Individual	Inessa Rodionova; Individual Neutral Athletes	Hilke Kollmetz; Germany	Jane Carter; United States
Sabre Individual	Nicole Thome; Germany	Zarina Tilliakhodzhaeva; Individual Neutral Athletes	Julie Seal; United States
Sabre Individual	Nicole Thome; Germany	Zarina Tilliakhodzhaeva; Individual Neutral Athletes	Dorothea Tanzmeister; Austria

=== Vet-60 ===
==== Men ====
Event	Gold	Silver	Bronze
Épée Individual	Achim Bellmann; Germany	Herve Le Barbier; France	Federico Strano; Italy
Épée Individual	Achim Bellmann; Germany	Herve Le Barbier; France	Mariusz Krzeminski; Poland
Foil Individual	Christian Dousse; Switzerland	Igor Tarasov; Individual Neutral Athletes	Greerson Mcmullen Sr; Great Britain
Foil Individual	Christian Dousse; Switzerland	Igor Tarasov; Individual Neutral Athletes	Yury Shvarts; Individual Neutral Athletes
Sabre Individual	George Matt; United States	Aleh Pimenau; Netherlands	Alberto Feira Chios; Italy
Sabre Individual	George Matt; United States	Aleh Pimenau; Netherlands	Joshua Runyan; United States

==== Women ====
Event	Gold	Silver	Bronze
Épée Individual	Paula Soitiala; Finland	Sarah Osvath; Australia	Frauke Hohlbein; Germany
Épée Individual	Paula Soitiala; Finland	Sarah Osvath; Australia	Carole Poncelet; France
Foil Individual	Sheila Anderson; Great Britain	Jenny Bonney-Millett; Australia	Astrid Kircheis; Germany
Foil Individual	Sheila Anderson; Great Britain	Jenny Bonney-Millett; Australia	Stefanie Reese; Germany
Sabre Individual	Robin Pernice; United States	Lydia Fabry; United States	Michele Narey; Great Britain
Sabre Individual	Robin Pernice; United States	Lydia Fabry; United States	Du Min Yi; Australia

=== Vet-70 ===
==== Men ====
Event	Gold	Silver	Bronze
Épée Individual	Daryl Taylor; United States	Eiichi Ide; Japan	Bruno Goossens; United States
Épée Individual	Daryl Taylor; United States	Eiichi Ide; Japan	Volker Fischer; Germany
Foil Individual	Richard Purdie; Australia	Maurizio Galvan; Italy	Philippe Bennett; United States
Foil Individual	Richard Purdie; Australia	Maurizio Galvan; Italy	Joseph Streb; United States
Sabre Individual	Giulio Paroli; Italy	Joseph Streb; United States	Donald Malnati; United States
Sabre Individual	Giulio Paroli; Italy	Joseph Streb; United States	Riccardo Carmina; Italy

==== Women ====
Event	Gold	Silver	Bronze
Épée Individual	Elizabeth Kocab; United States	Jane Clayton; Great Britain	Angela Kummich; Germany
Épée Individual	Elizabeth Kocab; United States	Jane Clayton; Great Britain	Marja-Liisa Tuulikki Someroja; Finland
Foil Individual	Anne-Marie Walters; United States	Kaoru Amari; Japan	Jane Clayton; Great Britain
Foil Individual	Anne-Marie Walters; United States	Kaoru Amari; Japan	Antoinette Willard; France
Sabre Individual	Jennette Starks-Faulkner; United States	Vivien Ena Frith; Great Britain	Jeannine Bender; United States
Sabre Individual	Jennette Starks-Faulkner; United States	Vivien Ena Frith; Great Britain	Linda Dunn; United States

=== Vet-ABC ===
==== Men ====
Event	Gold	Silver	Bronze
Épée Team	Germany; Achim Bellmann; Thomas Brudy-Zippelius; Volker Fischer; Werner Hensel; Alexander Marchet; Georg Schmidt-Thomee	France; Daniel Lagarde; Herve Le Barbier; Ludovic Lesne; Philippe Markov; Francois Ringeissen; Francois Wacquez	United Kingdom; Gregory Allen; Robert W Brooks; Andrew Brown; Hugh Deans Kernohan; Eric Lauga; SR Greerson Mcmullen
Foil Team	France; Bertrand Beaurenault; Cyril Lacroix; Pascal Jolyot; Francois Szuba; Philippe Baudouin; Claude Le Monnier	United States; Rafael A. Suarez C. Marek Wyszynski; Peter Grandbois; John Lawrence; Philippe Bennett; Joseph Streb	Italy; Lorenzo Persichetti; Filippo Pesce; Marco Bosio; Fabio Miraldi; Maurizio Galvan; Francesco Tiberi
Sabre Team	United States; Donald Malnati; George Matt; Phillips Kim; Joshua Runyan; Joseph Streb; Ronald Thornton	Italy; Paolo Busi; Riccardo Carmina; Alberto Feira Chios; Stefano Lanciotti; Camillo Matrigali; Giulio Paroli	Poland; Piotr Juszkiewicz; Janusz Mlynek; Robert Nowicki; Wojciech Ossowski; Michal Zablocki; Przemyslaw Zawrotniak

==== Women ====
Event	Gold	Silver	Bronze
Épée Team	Germany; Bettina Fichtel; Frauke Hohlbein; Karin Jansen; Astrid Kircheis; Angela Kummich; Carolin Marheineke	United States; Toby Tolley; Ann Marie Totemeier; Valerie Asher; Lydia Fabry; Charlotta Bowie; Elizabeth Kocab	France; Pascale Appavoupoulle; Brigitte Delacour; Sandra Laisney; Annick Martin; Carole Poncelet; Valerie Preaux
Foil Team	United States; Jane Carter; Julie Seal; Kathleen Hermes; Georgina Love; Jennette Starks-Faulkner; Anne-Marie Walters	Germany; Claudia Drechsel; Barbel Gorius; Astrid Kircheis; Hilke Kollmetz; Stefanie Reese; Angelika Schramm	Italy; Gianna Cirillo; Maria Franca Col; Martina Ganassin; Iris Gardini; Liqin Wei; Francesca Zurlo
Sabre Team	United States; Linda Dunn; Lydia Fabry; Nona Lim Yean Hong; Robin Pernice; Julie Seal; Jennette Starks-Faulkner	United Kingdom; Silvia Brown; Jacqueline Esimaje-Heath; Vivien Ena Frith; Jane S Hutchison; Caroline Martin; Michele Narey	Austria; Agota Balot; Astrid Chiari; Enrica Seltenhammer; Dorothea Tanzmeister

== Medal table ==
* Host nation (United Arab Emirates)

Rank	Nation	Gold	Silver	Bronze	Total
1	United States	9	4	13	26
2	Germany	4	2	5	11
3	France	3	4	5	12
4	Italy	2	3	6	11
5	Great Britain	2	3	4	9
6	Australia	1	2	1	4
–	Individual Neutral Athletes	1	2	1	4
7	Switzerland	1	1	0	2
8	Finland	1	0	1	2
9	Japan	0	2	0	2
10	Netherlands	0	1	0	1
11	Austria	0	0	2	2
11	Poland	0	0	2	2
13	Croatia	0	0	1	1
13	Sweden	0	0	1	1
Totals (14 entries)		24	24	42	90
