= Dorothy Kim =

Mediaeval literature scholar

- Occupations: Mediaevalist, digital humanist

Academic background
- Education: University of California

Academic work
- Discipline: Mediaeval literature
- Institutions: Brandeis University

Dorothy Kim is a scholar of mediaeval literature, drama and digital humanities. She is an Assistant Professor at Brandeis University, and was previously a 2013–2014 Fellow at the University of Michigan's Frankel Institute of Advanced Judaic Studies. She is known for her work on white supremacism in mediaeval studies.

== Prizes and awards ==
Dorothy Kim was named a 2023 Winner of the Article Prize in Critical Race Studies by the Medieval Academy of America. She also won the 2022 American Studies Association Digital Humanities Book Award Alternative Historiographies of the Digital Humanities.

== Rachel Fulton Brown controversy ==
Kim drew attention to posts published by University of Chicago professor and fencer Rachel Fulton Brown, which subsequently gained attention as part of a broader discussion regarding white nationalism and medieval studies. As described by The New York Times:

The idea of medieval studies as a haven for white nationalist ideas gained ground when Rachel Fulton Brown, an associate professor of medieval history at the University of Chicago, began feuding with Dorothy Kim, an assistant professor of medieval English literature at Brandeis, after Dr. Kim, writing on Facebook, highlighted an old blog post of Dr. Fulton Brown’s titled "Three Cheers for White Men," calling it an example of "medievalists upholding white supremacy."

== Sources ==
- Livingstone, Josephine. 2017. "University History Departments Have a Race Problem". October 25, 2017. The New Republic, October 25, 2017. Online.
- Roll, Nick. 2017. "A schism in medieval studies for all to see." Inside Higher Ed, September 18, 2017.
- Schuessler, Jennifer. Medieval scholars joust with white supremacists. And one another. May 5, 2019. The New York Times. Medieval Scholars Joust With White Nationalists. And One Another.
- Watersone, Tess. Review: Alternative Historiographies of the Digital Humanities, Lilith: A Feminist History Journal: Number 29
