= Miriam Jiménez Román =

Scholar, activist, and author of Afro-Latinx culture

Miriam Jiménez Román (June 11, 1951 – August 6, 2020) was a Puerto Rican scholar, activist, and author on Afro-Latino culture, whose work is described as "without a doubt ... [making] an enormous contribution to the theoretical discussion surrounding Latinidad in the United States." Her work on Afro-Latinidad was foundational to the field of cultural studies in that she developed programming, research, and spaces for the various Afro-Latino communities in the United States.

== Biography ==
First, we're not in a post racial state. Race is still a very important part of how all of us – globally – live our lives. African-Americans and Latinos need to get together, create change that will benefit not just Latinos and African-Americans but all people of color.

— Miriam Jiménez Román, Los Afro-Latinos Q&A with Miriam Jiménez Román, March 2012

Jiménez Román was born on June 11, 1951, in Aguadilla, Puerto Rico. Miriam graduated from Manhattan's High School of Art and Design in 1969, She was a visiting scholar in Africana Studies at New York University. Along with her husband, Juan Flores, she was co-editor of the Afro-Latin@ Studies Reader: History and Culture in the United States, a collection of essays, short stories, poetry, memoirs, interviews and writing on the Afro-Latino experience. The work was described as "a corrective text that helps fill in crucial scholarly gaps" in a field, Afro-Latina/o studies, in which there is very little scholarship. It "makes accessible ... a virtually ignored set of important contributions ... to the study of Afro-Latina/os", and, "makes a critical intervention in scholarship and public discourse about racial identities and the history and culture of U.S. Afro-Latina/o communities." Jiménez Román and Flores received an American Book Award for The Afro-Latin@Reader in 2011.

Her other publications included "Un hombre (negro) del pueblo: José Celso Barbosa and the Puerto Rican Race Towards Whiteness", "Looking at that Middle Ground: Racial Mixing as Panacea?", and "Triple-Consciousness? Approaches to Afro-Latino Culture in the United States."

She was executive director of the Afrolatin@ Forum from 2011 to 2020. She was also a member of the Black Latinas Know Collective and a member of the advisory board for the Encyclopedia Africana.

She was profiled on Remezcla as the first of "8 Afro Latinos Who Made Important Contributions to US History", by Mitú as an "Afro-Latino Figure Who Changed The World For The Good", and by Latina as one of "6 Afro-Latinas Who Are Changing the World!".

Miriam Jiménez Román died of cancer at age 69 on August 6, 2020, in Cabo Rojo, Puerto Rico.
