= Ella Hattan =

American fencer and actress (1859–?)

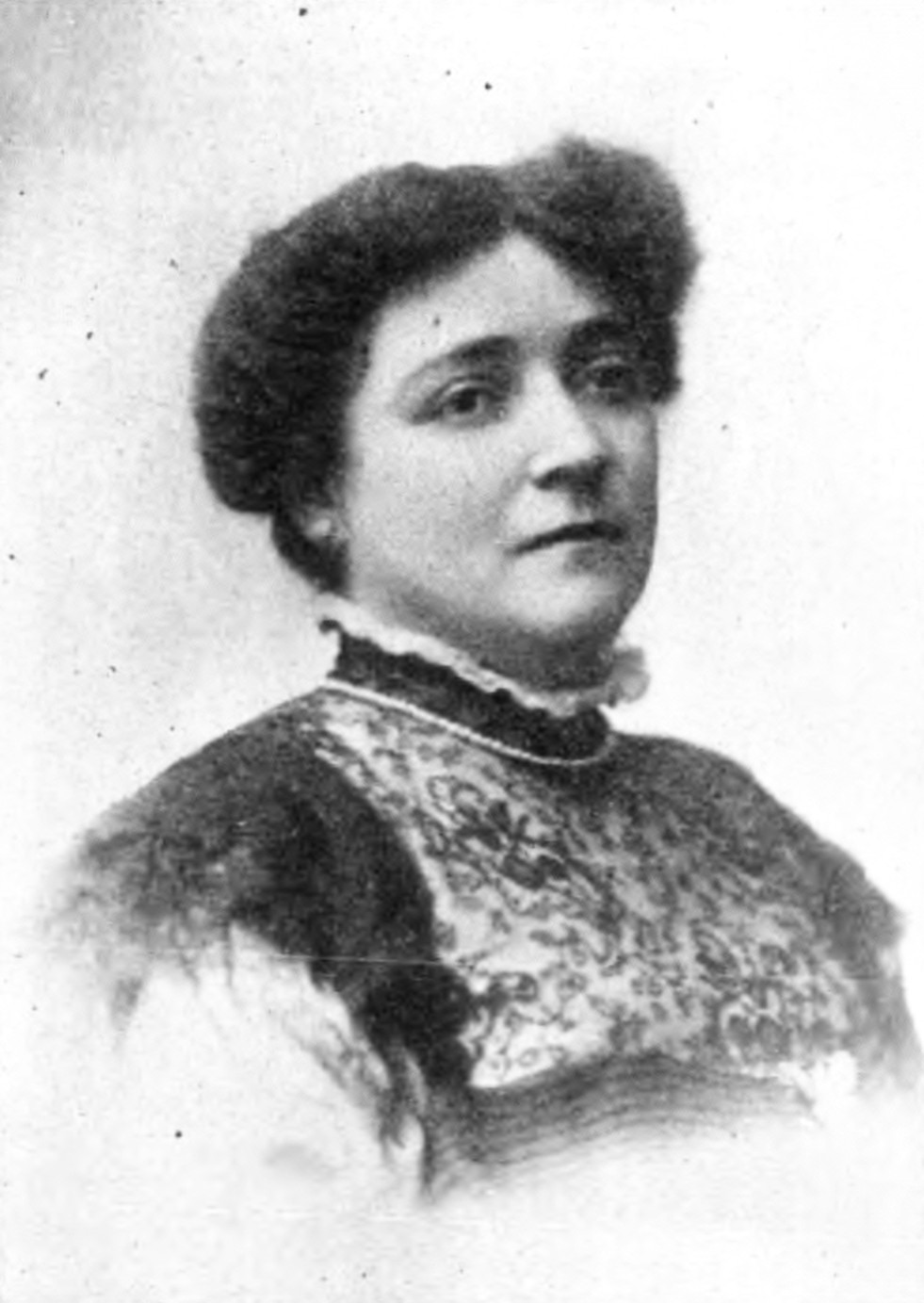
- Hattan in 1906
- Born: January 8, 1860; Zanesville, Ohio, U.S.
- Died: June 15, 1924 (aged 64)
- Other names: Ella M. Bates; Ella M. Beavan; La Jaguarina
- Occupations: fencer, actress

Ella M. Hattan (January 8, 1860 — June 15, 1924), also known as La Jaguarina, was an American fencer and actress.

== Early life ==
Ella Hattan was born in Zanesville, Ohio, the tenth child of Maria C. Hinman (also recorded as Highman and Hull) and the tailor William Hattan. Her father died of exposure in Maryland in September 1863 while fighting for the Union in the Civil War.

By 1876, Hattan was a professional actor. She performed with Laurence Barrett, Edwin Booth, and Dion Boucicault, and other familiar actors of the time. Her younger sisters Eva (a.k.a. Effie) and Emma also went into the entertainment business, performing for several years as The Hull Twin Sisters.

Hattan married fellow actor Joseph E. Nagle, Jr. on December 1, 1880. It is unclear when or why this marriage was dissolved, but Nagle had remarried by the time of his sudden death in 1886.

== Fencing career ==
In 1884, Hattan became known by her stage name La Jaguarina (also spelled Jaguarine and Jaquarina), "Queen of the Sword," "Champion Amazon of the World," and "Ideal Amazon of the Age." From 1884 to 1900, Hattan established herself as skillful with the sword and the broadsword on horseback was an audience favorite.

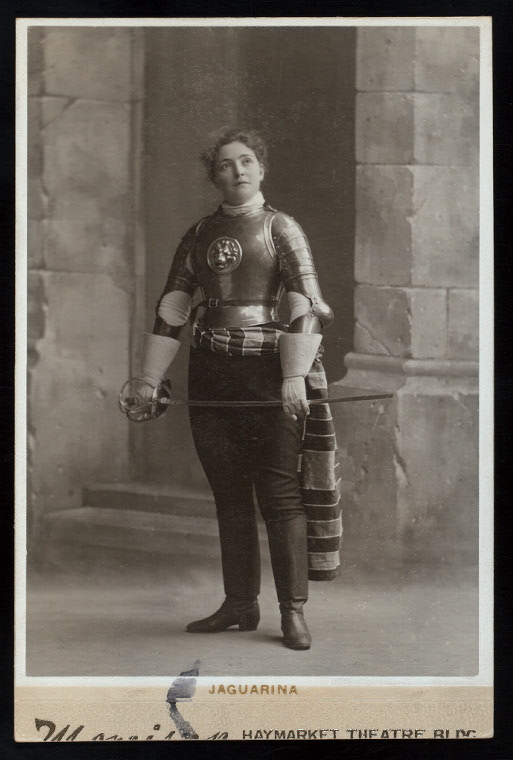
Jaguarina (Ella Hattan) in an armored costume.

On July 4, 1886, Hattan defeated Captain J. H. Marshall, but he defeated her in the second round. Hattan met, and typically defeated, a string of male opponents, which brought her to fame and popularity. On February 9, 1887, Hattan's biggest victory was against Sergeant Owen Davis of the U.S. Cavalry and was covered heavily by the San Francisco papers.

== Later life ==
After going through the string of male opponents willing to fight her, her manager, Fredrich Engelhardt, brought her a vaudeville tour throughout California. She educated the crowd on fencing bouts and performed semi-nude tableaux vivants poses. Soon after the tour ended, Hattan moved back east.

Hattan married the theatre promoter Wilbur Melville Bates on June 19, 1895, in Manhattan. She spent most of the next decade off the stage. In 1899, she was the maître d'armes for the Broadway play The Musketeers. Hatten sued Bates for divorce (allegedly because of a dalliance he had with the actor Pauline Frederick) and her petition was granted in 1905.

The same year as her divorce, Hattan appeared on Broadway in the melodrama The Life That Kills. In 1906, she played the muscular hotel porter Kate Croops in the comedy musical The Vanderbilt Cup. Hattan later told a reporter her return to the stage was due to "necessity."

While Hattan performed under her birth name for the first time since 1883, many newspapers revealed to their readers that the actor was La Jaguarina. After being asked repeatedly about her fencing career and if she planned on coming out of retirement, Hattan wrote to the sporting editor of the Brooklyn Times, stating, "[In 1901,] I ... announced that I had retired as a fencer and would never appear in a public sword contest again. To this decision I still adhere."

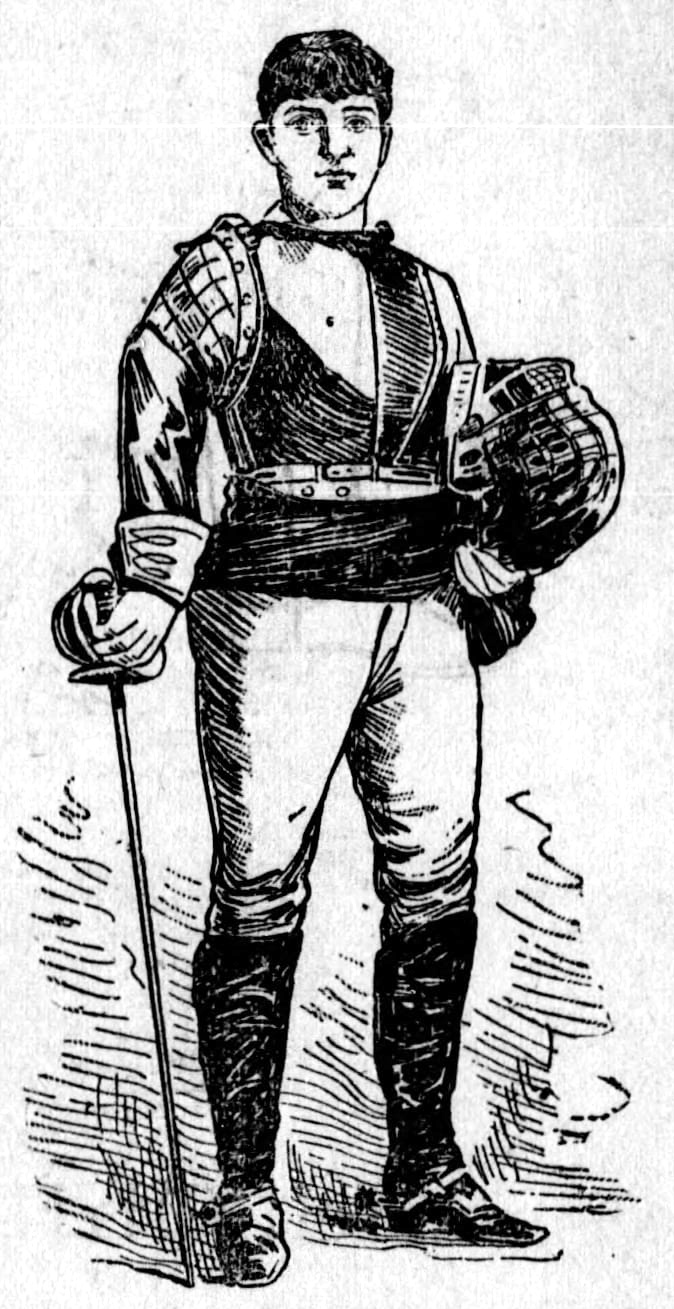
Jaguarina (Ella Hattan), 1892

The last known professional mention of Ella Hattan in newsprint was from The Brooklyn Citizen, on February 11, 1908. She was with a touring company, portraying the character of Jeannette Black in Charles E. Blaney's play Lottie, the Poor Saleslady, or, Death Before Dishonor.

In 1920, Hattan married Edward G. Beavan. She died on June 15, 1924, of a cerebral hemorrhage and is buried in Green-Wood Cemetery.

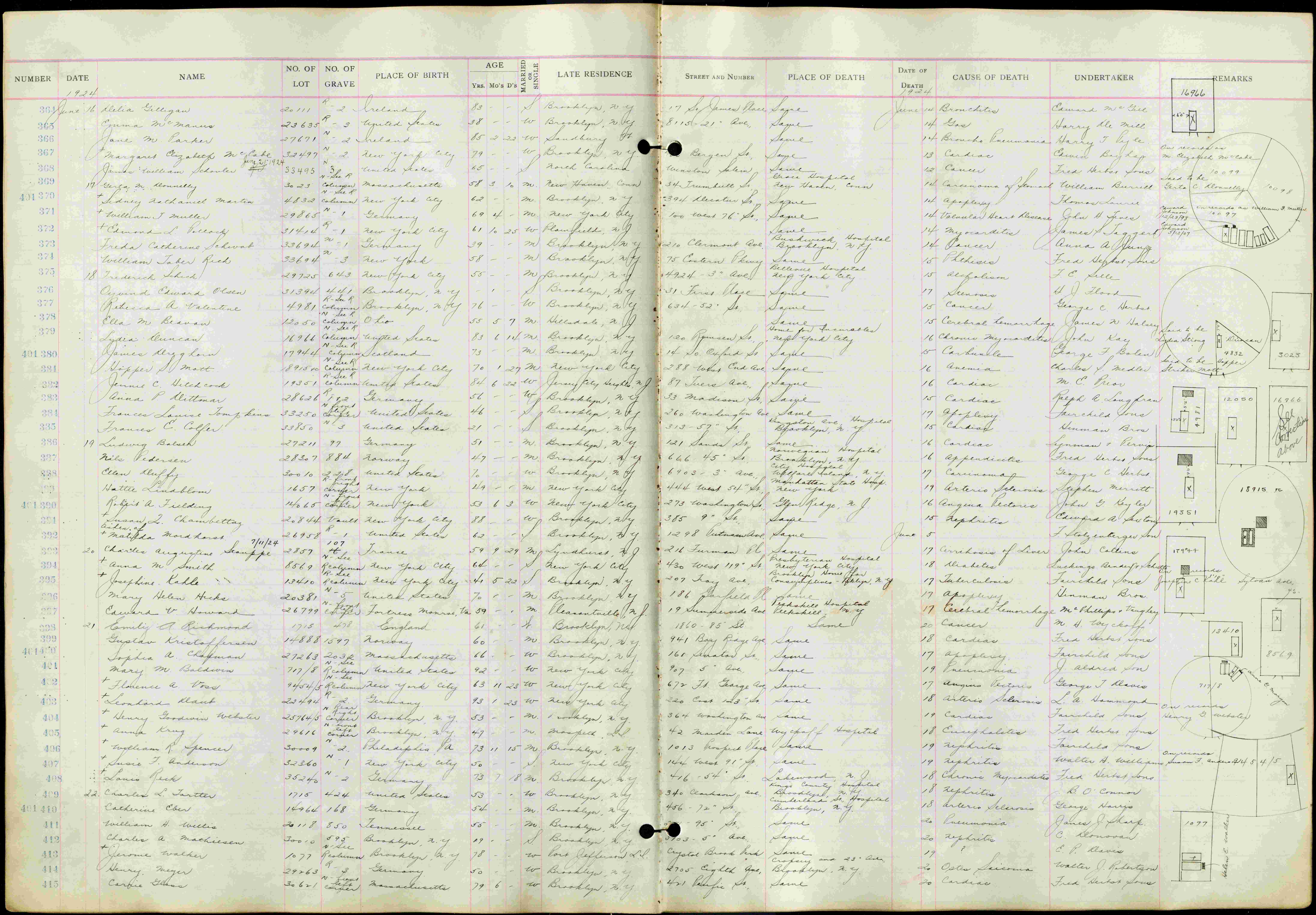
Green-Wood Cemetery burial record for Ella M. Beavan (née Ella Hattan)

== See also ==
- List of USFA Hall of Fame members
