= Denise O'Connor =

American fencer

Personal information
- Born: 18 May 1935 (age 90); Bayonne, New Jersey, United States

Sport
- Country: United States
- Sport: Fencing
- Now coaching: Brooklyn College women's team

Denise O'Connor (born May 18, 1935) is an American former fencer. She competed for the United States in the women's team foil events at the 1964 and 1976 Summer Olympics.

She also fenced in five World Championships (1965, '66, '69, '70, '75), and the 1975 Pan American Games in which she won a bronze medal. She was coach of the Brooklyn College women's fencing team for over a decade, ultimately becoming the college's Assistant Director of Athletics. In 1975 and 1976, she was National Intercollegiate Women's Fencing Association College Coach of the Year.

O'Connor has been a resident of Bayonne, New Jersey.

== See also ==
- List of USFA Hall of Fame members
