= Ron Miller (fencing coach) =

American fencing coach (1944–2023)

Ron Miller (1944 – June 5, 2023) was an American fencing coach and the founder and head coach of the fencing team at UNC Chapel Hill. Over the course of his career, he recorded 1,602 wins across 52 years, making him both the longest tenured coach at UNC and the winningest coach in NCAA history.

In 2024, Miller's book, The Ultimate Guide to the Ultimate Sport of Fencing, was published posthumously. https://a.co/d/0e1iNIQW

== Early life and education ==
As a student, Miller was competitive in high school in basketball, football, wrestling, and track, while fencing at a local YMCA. He originally wanted to be an architect, but after a frost wiped out his family's crops, he had no money for architecture school. He first attended community college, where he worked designing swimming pools, but quickly learned that he wanted a job that involved physical activity. Miller transferred to Florida State in 1966 and then earned a master's degree at Eastern Kentucky University, and Ph.D. from UNC in Exercise Science, Higher Education, Guidance and Psychology in 1974. In 1980, he earned a Maitre D’Armes.

While in graduate school, Miller had written a paper on the kinesiology of fencing and a professor of his put him in touch with the chair of UNC's physical education. Miller moved to UNC as a physical education instructor and started the fencing program at UNC in 1967. He finished 8–1 in his first season, and built the team into a varsity sport in 1970.

== Career ==
Miller taught between 40,000 and 50,000 fencers throughout his career across physical education classes, varsity team members, and club athletes, including 14 All-Americans, five US National Fencing team members, and two Olympians. He also served as a director of the U.S. Fencing National Junior elite Training Program and directed the US Fencing's National Coaches College. Under his leadership, UNC won eight conference titles from 1971 to 1980. Miller was famous for his “passion, dedication, and unwavering commitment to his students” as well as his mentorship of students throughout their lives. He maintained his team GPA above 3.0 for his 52 years and qualified a fencer for the NCAA Championships in every season he coached. Miller was two-time NCAA Coach of the Year and in 2017 was honored as a Priceless Gem at UNC, “in recognition of his outstanding contributions to the University of North Carolina.” In 2023, he was inducted in the USA Fencing hall of fame.

== Death ==
Miller died from complications of melanoma on June 5, 2023, at the age of 78.

== See also ==
- List of USFA Hall of Fame members
