= Carl Morris =

Carl Morris may refer to:

- Carl Morris (painter) (1911–1993), American painter
- Carl E. Morris (1887–1951), American boxer
- Carl Morris (statistician) (1938–2023), professor of statistics at Harvard University
- Carl Morris, a fictional character in the British TV series, Moving Wallpaper
