= Ralph Goldstein (fencer) =

American fencer (1913–1997)

Personal information
- Full name: Ralph Myer Goldstein
- Born: October 6, 1913 Malden, Massachusetts, U.S.
- Died: July 25, 1997 (aged 83) Bennington, Vermont, U.S.

Sport
- Country: United States
- Sport: Fencing
- Event: épée
- College team: Brooklyn College
- Club: Salle Santelli

Ralph Myer Goldstein (October 6, 1913 – July 25, 1997) was an American Olympic épée fencer.

== Early and personal life ==
Goldstein was born in Malden, Massachusetts, and was Jewish. He grew up on the Lower East Side in Manhattan, New York, and attended Brooklyn College, fencing for the college's fencing team. He lived in Yonkers, New York, and in Waterbury, Connecticut, from 1948 on.

He was killed in a car accident in July 1997, at the age of 83, when Goldstein had a heart attack and his car collided in a head-on collision with a propane truck outside Bennington, Vermont.

== Fencing career ==
Goldstein competed for the United States in the team épée events at the 1948 Summer Olympics in London and the 1956 Summer Olympics in Melbourne, and was captain of the team at the 1960 Summer Olympics in Rome.

He won Amateur Fencers League of America (AFLA) titles in team épée with Salle Santelli in 1947-48, 1950, 1953, and 1955, and won team 3-weapon titles in 1952-54.

Goldstein also competed in many of the Maccabiah Games in Israel, the Olympic-style competition for Jewish athletes. He won a silver medal in epee at the 1953 Maccabiah Games, losing in the finals to Great Britain's world champion runner-up Allan Jay.

He was Secretary of the Amateur Fencers League of America (now the United States Fencing Association) from 1957-60. He was also Editor of American Fencing magazine from 1969-76.

Goldstein was inducted into the US Fencing Hall of Fame. In 1988 he was also named a Referee Emeritus, the highest honor for USA Fencing referees, awarded for multiple Olympic experience and great service to the sport of fencing in the national and international arenas, thereby retaining his USA Fencing referee rating for life. The Ralph Goldstein Memorial Épée Open is held annually in his honor.

== See also ==
- List of USFA Hall of Fame members
