= Juan Flores (professor) =

American academic

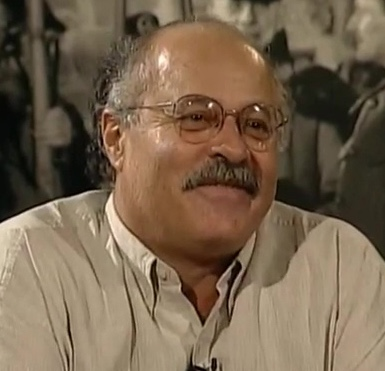
- Flores on CUNY TV's City Cinematheque, 1998
- Born: John Martin Flores; September 29, 1943; Alexandria, Virginia
- Died: December 2, 2014 (aged 71); Durham, North Carolina
- Occupation: Latino Studies Scholar

Juan Flores (born John Martin Flores; September 29, 1943 – December 2, 2014) was a Professor of Social and Cultural Analysis and director of Latino Studies at New York University. He was considered a leading pioneer, scholar, and expert in Latin American and Nuyorican culture, often working with his wife Miriam Jiménez Román.

== Educational Background ==
Flores received his Bachelor of Arts degree from Queens College in New York, and both his Masters and Ph.D from Yale University in German Literature. Flores' major areas of interest include social and cultural theory, Latino and Puerto Rican studies, popular music, theory of diaspora and transnational communities and Afro-Latino culture.

== Social and cultural theory ==
Flores' work articulates how culture is represented, identified, produced, consumed and regulated within Latino diasporic communities in more recent times.

== Theory of diaspora and transnational communities ==
In his book The Diaspora Strikes Back: Caribeño Tales of Learning and Turning, Flores distinguishes between “new diasporas” and those of earlier time periods by noting the difference in “the intensity and reciprocity of the ties between emigrant or exiled populations and their countries of origin” (Flores, 2009). Flores regularly uses the analogy of seeds being spread and growing where they land to describe the Latino diasporic experience. Flores describes the culture formed in the communities where they reside as dynamic and continuously changing due to the exchange of cultural remittances. He focuses specifically on the transculturation that occurs as groups move from their homeland to the U.S. and back.

== Afro-Latino culture ==
Much of Flores' work on the Afro-Latino culture has focused on its progression in the United States. In The Afro-Latino Reader, he analyzes the way in which Afro-Latinos are racially categorized according to Eurocentered colonial standards and how this categorization changes according to location. Jiménez Román and Flores received an American Book Award for The Afro-Latin@Reader in 2011.

== Death ==
On December 2, 2014, Flores died at the age of 71 of an apparent pulmonary embolism at the Duke University Medical Center in Durham, North Carolina. He also was afflicted with Guillain–Barré syndrome.

== Awards ==
Flores has been the recipient of numerous awards and honors including:

- Casa de las Americas Prize Insularismo e ideologia burguesa en Antonio Pedreira (1980)
- Ford grant for The Afro-Latin@ Project (2002-3)
- National Endowment for the Humanities (NEH) Research Fellowship (2007)
- Smithsonian Institution Latino Legacy Award (2008)
- Casa de las Americas Prize (2009) for Bugalú y otros guisos: ensayos sobre culturas Latinas en Estados Unidos (2010).

== Selected works ==
- 1970: Poetry in East Germany
- 1980: Insularismo e ideologia burguesa en Antonio Pedreira- Premio Casa de las Américas, (Americas Extraordinary Prize for studies on Latinos in the United States)
- 1993: Divided Borders: Essays on Puerto Rican Identity - a collection of the essays on Puerto Rican culture, history, and literature.
- 1997: La venganza de Cortijo
- 2000: From Bomba to Hip-Hop: Puerto Rican Culture and Latino Identity - In this book, Flores describes and celebrates the unique role of Puerto Rican culture in the music, literature and other pop culture in their more recent history in the United States.
- 2004: Cortijo's Wake - Juan Flores translated this piece by Edgardo Rodríguez Juliá, describing the funeral of Puerto Rican musician Rafael Cortijo.
- 2007: A Companion to Latino Studies - A collection co-edited with Renato Rosaldo that includes forty original essays written by leading scholars in the field, dedicated to exploring the question of Latino/Latina identity.
- 2009: The Diaspora Strikes Back: Caribeño Tales of Learning and Turning - In this book, Flores examines the “new” diasporic process and the effects that this transnational movement has on the home country.
- 2010: Bugalú y otros guisos: ensayos sobre culturas latinas en Estados Unidos - Describes Latino culture in the United States.
- 2011: The Afro-Latin@ Reader: History and Culture in the United States - Includes a selection of more than sixty scholarly essays, short stories, newspaper and magazine articles, memoirs, interviews and poetry that discuss the unique social and ethnic categorical position of Latinos of African descent in the United States and throughout the Americas.
- 2016: Salsa Rising: New York Latin Music of the Sixties Generation

== See also ==
- List of Afro-Latinos
- List of Queens College people
