= Afro-Dominican =

Afro-Dominican may refer to:

- Afro-Dominican (Dominican Republic)
- Afro-Dominican (Dominica)
