= Grandbois Lake =

Lake in Quebec, Canada

- Location in Quebec
- Location: Rivière-à-Pierre and Saint-Raymond, Portneuf Regional County Municipality, Capitale-Nationale, Quebec, Canada
- Coordinates: 47.01472°N 72.11639°W
- Lake type: Natural
- Primary inflows: (Clockwise from the mouth) Noire Lake outlet, Alba lake outlet, Croissy, Fénelon and Huard lakes outlet, Lac Monchel outlet.
- Primary outflows: Noire River
- Basin countries: Canada
- Max. length: 1.2 km (0.75 mi)
- Max. width: 0.6 km (0.37 mi)
- Surface elevation: 301 m (988 ft)

Lac Grandbois is a freshwater body straddling the municipalities of Rivière-à-Pierre (southern part of the lake) and Saint-Raymond (northern part of the lake), in Portneuf Regional County Municipality, in the administrative region of Capitale-Nationale, in the province of Quebec, in Canada. Lac Grandbois proves to be the main head of the Noire River.

The west side of the lake is served by a forest road linking north the main street of Rivière-à-Pierre; the east side is served by a forest path linking south the Petit-lac-Batiscan path which runs along Perron stream.

Forestry is the main economic activity in the sector; recreational tourism, second. This lake is located on the east side of zec Batiscan-Neilson and on the south side of the territory of Portneuf Wildlife Reserve.

The surface of Lac Grandbois is usually frozen from the beginning of December to the end of March, however the safe circulation on the ice is generally made from mid-December to mid-March.

== Geography ==
Lac Grandbois has a length of 1.2 kilometres (0.75 mi) and an altitude of 301 metres (988 ft). He gets his supplies from:

- southwest side: by the outlet of Lac Noir via the marsh bay of the southern part of Lac Grandbois;
- north side: by the outlet of Lake Alba, which flows into a bay stretching over 0.4 kilometres (0.25 mi) to the west;
- north side: by the outlet of lakes Huard, Fénelon and Croissy;
- northeast side: by the outlet of Monchel Lake.

The mouth of Lac Grandbois is located at the bottom of a small bay on the southeast shore. From there, the current flows on:

- 63 kilometres (39 mi) to the south by the Noire River;
- 27.9 kilometres (17.3 mi) southwards by the Sainte-Anne River which flows on the northwest bank of the Saint-Laurent river.

== Toponymy ==
The toponym "Lac Grandbois" was officialized on December 5, 1968, at the Place Names Bank of the Commission de toponymie du Québec.

== See also ==
- Portneuf Regional County Municipality (MRC)
- Rivière-à-Pierre, a municipality
- Noire River
- Sainte-Anne River
