= Achim Bellmann =

German modern pentathlete (born 1957)

Personal information
- Born: 27 July 1957 (age 68) Münster, West Germany

Sport
- Sport: Modern pentathlon

Achim Bellmann (born 27 July 1957) is a German modern pentathlete. He competed for West Germany at the 1984 Summer Olympics.
