= Veteran Fencing World Championships =

Annual international fencing competition

- Status: Active
- Frequency: Annual
- Previous event: 2025
- Organiser: International Fencing Federation
- Website: fie.org

The Veteran Fencing World Championships are an annual international fencing competition held by the International Fencing Federation. Entries were restricted to those 40 years old or older. The most recent event was held in 2025.

== Summary ==
Year	Host City	Host Country	Events
2023	Daytona Beach, Florida	United States	24
2024	Dubai	United Arab Emirates	24
2025	Manama	Bahrain	36
2026	Tbilisi	Georgia	36
