= List of NCAA fencing schools =

Map of schools offering women's varsity fencing

Map of schools offering men's varsity fencing

This is a list of colleges and universities with NCAA-sanctioned fencing teams. Starting in 2025–26, the NCAA has reinstated separate men's and women's fencing championship, after having held a single coeducational championship meet since the 1989–90 school year. Schools of every division compete together regularly. Most major conferences do not sponsor fencing, with the notable exceptions of the Ivy League, the Atlantic Coast Conference, and the Mountain Pacific Sports Federation. The Atlantic Coast Conference reinstated the sport beginning in 2014–15 after having previously sponsored it from 1971 through 1980, while the Mountain Pacific Sports Federation added the sport beginning in the 2021–22 season. Most other schools compete as independents.

== Division I schools ==
School	Conference	NCAA Fencing Region
Boston College	Atlantic Coast Conference	Northeast
Duke University	Atlantic Coast Conference	Mid-Atlantic/South
University of North Carolina at Chapel Hill	Atlantic Coast Conference	Mid-Atlantic/South
University of Notre Dame	Atlantic Coast Conference	Midwest
Stanford University	Atlantic Coast Conference	West
Brown University (Women Only)	Ivy League	Northeast
Columbia University	Ivy League	Northeast
Cornell University (Women Only)	Ivy League	Northeast
Harvard University	Ivy League	Northeast
Princeton University	Ivy League	Mid-Atlantic/South
University of Pennsylvania	Ivy League	Mid-Atlantic/South
Yale University	Ivy League	Northeast
United States Air Force Academy	Mountain Pacific Sports Federation	West
University of the Incarnate Word	Mountain Pacific Sports Federation	West
University of California, San Diego	Mountain Pacific Sports Federation	West
Cleveland State University	Central Collegiate Fencing Conference	Midwest
University of Detroit Mercy	Central Collegiate Fencing Conference	Midwest
Fairleigh Dickinson University (Women Only, Men Beginning 2027-28)	Independent	Mid-Atlantic/South
Lafayette College	Mid-Atlantic Collegiate Fencing Association	Mid-Atlantic/South
Long Island University	Independent	Northeast
New Jersey Institute of Technology	Mid-Atlantic Collegiate Fencing Association	Mid-Atlantic/South
Northwestern University (Women Only)	Central Collegiate Fencing Conference	Midwest
Ohio State University	Central Collegiate Fencing Conference	Midwest
Pennsylvania State University	Independent	Mid-Atlantic/South
Sacred Heart University	Northeast Fencing Conference	Northeast
St. John's University, New York	Independent	Northeast
Temple University (Women Only)	Independent	Mid-Atlantic/South
Wagner College	Independent	Mid-Atlantic/South

== Division II schools ==
School	Conference	NCAA Fencing Region
Wayne State University	Central Collegiate Fencing Conference	Mid-Atlantic/South

== Division III schools ==
School	Conference	NCAA Fencing Region
Arcadia University (beginning 2027–28)	N/A	N/A
Brandeis University	Northeast Fencing Conference	Northeast
City College of New York (women only, men beginning 2027-28)	Independent	Northeast
Denison University	Central Collegiate Fencing Conference	Midwest
Drew University	Mid-Atlantic Collegiate Fencing Association	Mid-Atlantic/South
Haverford College	Mid-Atlantic Collegiate Fencing Association	Mid-Atlantic/South
Hunter College	Mid-Atlantic Collegiate Fencing Association	Northeast
Johns Hopkins University	Mid-Atlantic Collegiate Fencing Association	Mid-Atlantic/South
Lawrence University	Central Collegiate Fencing Conference	Midwest
Massachusetts Institute of Technology	Northeast Fencing Conference	Northeast
New York University	Independent	Northeast
Stevens Institute of Technology	Mid-Atlantic Collegiate Fencing Association	Mid-Atlantic/South
Trinity College (women beginning 2027, men beginning 2028)	Northeast Fencing Conference	Northeast
Tufts University (women only)	Northeast Fencing Conference	Northeast
Vassar College	Northeast Fencing Conference	Northeast
Wellesley College (women only)	Northeast Fencing Conference	Northeast
Wheaton College (Massachusetts)	Northeast Fencing Conference	Northeast
Yeshiva University	Mid-Atlantic Collegiate Fencing Association	Mid-Atlantic/South

== See also ==
- NCAA Fencing Championships
- Intercollegiate Fencing Association (IFA)
- National Intercollegiate Women's Fencing Association (NIWFA)
- United States Association of Collegiate Fencing Clubs (USACFC)
- United States Fencing Hall of Fame
