= NCAA fencing championships =

Collegiate fencing tournament

- Association: NCAA
- Sport: Collegiate fencing
- Founded: 1941; 85 years ago
- Division: Division I, Division II, and Division III
- Country: United States
- Most recent champions: Women's Team: Notre Dame (2); Men's Team: Notre Dame (4)
- Most titles: Team: Columbia (16), Notre Dame (16)
- Website: NCAA.com

The NCAA fencing championships are contested at an annual competition organized by the National Collegiate Athletic Association to determine the team and individual champions of co-educational collegiate fencing among its member programs in the United States. It has been held every year since 1941, except during World War II and in 2020.

Individual men's and women's championships are awarded in three events (foil, épée, and sabre) with an aggregate team championship awarded based on these individual performances.

Unlike most NCAA sports, the fencing championship is a National Collegiate (NC) championship rather than being split into divisions; as such, teams from Division I, Division II, and Division III all compete together.

== History ==
Prior to 1990, separate men's and women's championships were held, but from 1990 to 2025, fencing was a coed sport with teams having men's and women's squads, although some schools field only a women's team. Fencing is a single-division sport with schools from all three NCAA divisions competing against each other.

Fencing was one of twelve women's sports added to the NCAA championship program for the 1981–82 school year, as the NCAA engaged in battle with the Association for Intercollegiate Athletics for Women (AIAW) for sole governance of women's collegiate sports. The AIAW continued to conduct its established championship program in the same twelve (and other) sports; however, after a year of dual women's championships, the NCAA conquered the AIAW and usurped its authority and membership.

NCAA fencing follows the rules of the U.S. Fencing Association with several modifications.

=== Criticism of coed model ===
After publicity regarding the differences in facilities provided to participants in the 2021 Division I men's and women's basketball tournaments, the NCAA commissioned the law firm Kaplan Hecker & Fink (now known as Hecker Fink) to conduct a broad-based review of gender equity issues surrounding all of its championship events. The first phase dealt exclusively with Division I basketball; the second phase investigated all other NCAA championships, including fencing. In the second phase, both fencing stakeholders and NCAA staff identified a major gender inequity issue stemming from the NCAA's 1990 decision to combine the men's and women's team championships. As of the date of the report (the 2021–22 school year), no NCAA fencing programs fielded only a men's team, but several fielded only women's teams. Because the team champion was then determined by combining each school's men's and women's points earned, and entry rules limit the number of participants of each sex per school and region, women-only teams could not win the team championship. Some stakeholders suggested that men's and women's team championships be reintroduced, either as substitutes for or supplements to the current coed championship.

Separate men's and women's team championships were reinstated, effective with the 2026 Championships.

== Results ==
=== Separate team championships (2026–present) ===
Year	Venue	Team	Team Champions			Individual Champions		
Year	Venue	Team	Team Champion	Score	Team Runner-Up	Foil	Épée	Sabre
2028	College Township, PA	Men						
2028	College Township, PA	Women						
2027	Durham, NC	Men						
2027	Durham, NC	Women						
2026	Notre Dame, IN	Men	Notre Dame (4)	91-81	Columbia	Sam Kumbla, Columbia	Youssef Shamel, North Carolina	Ahmed Hesham, Notre Dame
2026	Notre Dame, IN	Women	Notre Dame (2)	102–99	Columbia-Barnard	Jessica Guo, Harvard (2)	Eszter Muhari, Notre Dame (3)	Natalia Botello, Ohio State

=== Co-ed team championships (1990–2025) ===
Year	Venue	Team Champions			Individual Champions		
Year	Venue	Team Champion	Score	Team Runner-Up	Foil	Épée	Sabre
2025	College Township, PA	Notre Dame (10)	183–172	Columbia-Barnard	Men: Chase Emmer, Notre Dame; Women: Arianna Cao, Stanford	Men: Mohamed Elsayed Saleh, Long Island University; Women: Eszter Muhari, Notre Dame	Men: Darii Lukashenko, St. John's; Women: Magda Skarbonkiewicz, Notre Dame
2024	Columbus, OH	Harvard (2)	169–161	Notre Dame	Men: Bryce Louie, Penn; Women: Jessica Guo, Harvard	Men: Tristan Szapary, Princeton; Women: Emily Vermeule, Harvard	Men: Luke Linder, Notre Dame; Women: Maggie Shealy, Brandeis
2023	Durham, NC	Notre Dame (9)	188–175	Princeton	Men: Jan Jurkiewicz, St. John's; Women: Lauren Scruggs, Harvard	Men: Jonas Hansen, Harvard; Women: Eszter Muhari, Notre Dame	Men: Luke Linder, Notre Dame; Women: Nora Burke, Columbia-Barnard
2022	Notre Dame, IN	Notre Dame (8)	189–168	Harvard	Men: Ashton Daniel, Columbia-Barnard; Women: Maia Weintraub, Princeton	Men: Gabriel Feinberg, Ohio State; Women: Kaylin Hsieh, Notre Dame	Men: Filip Dolegiewicz, Harvard; Women: Elizabeth Tartakovsky, Harvard
2021	College Township, PA	Notre Dame (7)	201–182	Penn State	Men: Marcello Olivares, Notre Dame; Women: Stefani Deschner, Notre Dame	Men: Ryan Griffiths, Penn State; Women: Laura Fekete, Long Island University	Men: Luke Linder, Notre Dame; Women: Kara Linder, Notre Dame
2020	Canceled due to COVID-19						
2019	Cleveland, OH	Columbia-Barnard (5)	178–166	Penn State	Men: Nick Itkin, Notre Dame; Women: Sylvie Binder, Columbia-Barnard	Men: Oliver Shindler, Ohio State; Women: Anne Cebula, Columbia-Barnard	Men: Karol Metryka, Penn State; Women: Karolina Cieślar, St. John's
2018	College Township, PA	Notre Dame (6)	185–170	Columbia-Barnard	Men: Nick Itkin, Notre Dame; Women: Iman Blow, Columbia-Barnard	Men: Marc-Antoine Blais, Ohio State; Women: Catherine Nixon, Princeton	Men: Eli Dershwitz, Harvard; Women: Maia Chamberlain, Princeton
2017 details	Indianapolis, IN	Notre Dame (5)	186–161	Ohio State	Men: Andras Nemeth, St. John's; Women: Lee Kiefer, Notre Dame	Men: Cooper Schumacher, St. John's; Women: Anna Van Brummen, Princeton	Men: Eli Dershwitz, Harvard; Women: Francesca Russo, Notre Dame
2016	Waltham, MA	Columbia-Barnard (4)	174–167	Ohio State	Men: Maximilien Chastanet, Ohio State; Women: Eleanor Harvey, Ohio State	Men: Jacob Hoyle, Columbia; Women: Jessie Radanovich, Penn State	Men: Andrew Mackiewicz, Penn State; Women: Adrienne Jarocki, Harvard
2015	Columbus, OH	Columbia-Barnard (3)	165–156	Penn State	Men: Alexander Massialas, Stanford; Women: Lee Kiefer, Notre Dame	Men: Jacob Hoyle, Columbia; Women: Isis Washington, St. John's	Men: Andrew Mackiewicz, Penn State; Women: Francesca Russo, Notre Dame
2014	Columbus, OH	Penn State (13)	180–159	Princeton	Men: Gerek Meinhardt, Notre Dame; Women: Lee Kiefer, Notre Dame	Men: Yevgeniy Karyuchenko, St. John's; Women: Vivian Kong, Stanford	Men: Kaito Streets, Penn State; Women: Adrienne Jarocki, Harvard
2013	San Antonio, TX	Princeton	182–175	Notre Dame	Men: Alexander Massialas, Stanford; Women: Lee Kiefer, Notre Dame	Men: Marco Canevari, Ohio State; Women: Courtney Hurley, Notre Dame	Men: Michael Mills, Penn; Women: Eliza Stone, Princeton
2012	Columbus, OH	Ohio State (3)	182–161	Princeton	Men: Zain Shaito, Ohio State; Women: Evgeniya Kirpicheva, St. John's	Men: Jonathan Yergler, Princeton; Women: Katarzyna Dabrowa, Ohio State	Men: Aleksander Ochocki, Penn State; Women: Rebecca Ward, Duke
2011	Columbus, OH	Notre Dame (4)	174–168	Penn State	Men: Ariel DeSmet, Notre Dame Women: Alexandra Kiefer, Harvard	Men: Marat Israelian, St. John's Women: Courtney Hurley, Notre Dame	Men: Daryl Homer, St. John's Women: Rebecca Ward, Duke
2010	Cambridge, MA	Penn State (12)	191–182	St. John's	Men: Gerek Meinhardt, Notre Dame Women: Nicole Ross, Columbia-Barnard	Men: Marat Israelian, St. John's Women: Margherita Guzzi Vincenti, Penn State	Men: Daryl Homer, St. John's Women: Caroline Vloka, Harvard
2009	University Park, PA	Penn State (11)	195–182	Notre Dame	Men: Nicholas Chinman, Penn State Women: Doris Willette, Penn State	Men: Slava Zingerman, Wayne State Women: Anastasia Ferdman, Penn State	Men: Aleksander Ochocki, Penn State Women: Rebecca Ward, Duke
2008	Columbus, OH	Ohio State (2)	185–176	Notre Dame	Men: Andras Horanyi, Ohio State Women: Monika Golebiewski, St. John's	Men: Slava Zingerman, Wayne State Women: Kelly Hurley, Notre Dame	Men: Jeff Spear, Columbia Women: Sarah Borrmann, Notre Dame
2007	Madison, NJ	Penn State (10)	194–176	St. John's	Men: Andras Horanyi, Ohio State Women: Doris Willette, Penn State	Men: Slava Zingerman, Wayne State Women: Anna Garina, Wayne State	Men: Timothy Hagamen, Harvard Women: Daria Schneider, Columbia-Barnard
2006	Houston, TX	Harvard	165–159	Penn State	Men: Boaz Ellis, Ohio State Women: Erzsebet Garay, St. John's	Men: Benji Ungar, Harvard Women: Katarzyna Trzopek, Penn State	Men: Adam Crompton, Ohio State Women: Mariel Zagunis, Notre Dame
2005	Houston, TX	Notre Dame (3)	173–171	Ohio State	Men: Boaz Ellis, Ohio State Women: Emily Cross, Harvard	Men: Michal Sobieraj, Notre Dame Women: Anna Garina, Wayne State	Men: Sergey Isayenko, St. John's Women: Emily Jacobson, Columbia-Barnard
2004	Waltham, MA	Ohio State	194–160	Penn State	Men: Boaz Ellis, Ohio State Women: Alicja Kryczalo, Notre Dame	Men: Arpad Horvath, St. John's Women: Anna Garina, Wayne State	Men: Adam Crompton, Ohio State Women: Valerie Providenza, Notre Dame
2003	USAF Academy, CO	Notre Dame (2)	182–179	Penn State	Men: Nontapat Panchan, Penn State Women: Alicja Kryczalo, Notre Dame	Men: Seth Kelsey, Air Force Women: Katarzyna Trzopek, Penn State	Men: Adam Crompton, Ohio State Women: Alexis Jemal, Rutgers
2002	Madison, NJ	Penn State (9)	195–190	St. John's	Men: Nontapat Panchan, Penn State Women: Alicja Kryczalo, Notre Dame	Men: Arpad Horvath, St. John's Women: Kerry Walton, Notre Dame	Men: Ivan Lee, St. John's Women: Sada Jacobson, Yale
2001	Somers, WI	St. John's	180–172	Penn State	Men: Jedediah Dupree, Columbia Women: Iris Zimmermann, Stanford	Men: Soren Thompson, Princeton Women: Emese Takacs, St. John's	Men: Ivan Lee, St. John's Women: Sada Jacobson, Yale
2000	Stanford, CA	Penn State (8)	175–171	Notre Dame; St. John's	Men: Felix Reichling, Stanford Women: Eva Petschnigg, Princeton	Men: Daniel Landgren, Penn State Women: Jessica Burke, Penn State	Men: Gabor Szelle, Notre Dame Women: Caroline Purcell, MIT
1999	Waltham, MA	Penn State (7)	171–139	Notre Dame	Men: Felix Reichling, Stanford Women: Monique DeBruin, Stanford	Men: Alex Roylblat, St. John's Women: Felicia Zimmerman, Stanford	Men: Keeth Smart, St. John's
1998	South Bend, IN	Penn State (6)	149–147	Notre Dame	Men: Ayo Griffin, Yale Women: Felicia Zimmerman, Stanford	Men: George Hentea, St. John's Women: Charlotte Walker, Penn State	Men: Luke LaValle, Notre Dame
1997	USAF Academy, CO	Penn State (5)	1,530–1,470	Notre Dame	Men: Cliff Bayer, Penn Women: Yelena Kalkina, Ohio State	Men: Alden Clarke, Stanford Women: Magda Krol, Notre Dame	Men: Keeth Smart, St. John's
1996	New Haven, CT	Penn State (4)	1,500–1,190	Notre Dame	Men: Thorstein Becker, Wayne State Women: Olga Kalinovskaya, Penn State	Men: Jeremy Kahn, Duke Women: Nicole Dygert, St. John's	Men: Maxim Pekarev, Princeton
1995	Notre Dame, IN	Penn State (3)	440–413	St. Johns	Men: Sean McClain, Stanford Women: Olga Kalinovskaya, Penn State	Men: Mike Gattner, Lawrence Women: Tina Loven, St. John's	Men: Paul Palestis, NYU
1994	Waltham, MA	Notre Dame	4,350–4,075	Penn State	Men: Kwame van Leeuwen, Harvard Women: Olga Kalinovskaya, Penn State	Men: Harold Winkmann, Princeton	Men: Thomas Strzalkowski, Penn State
1993	Detroit, MI	Columbia-Barnard (2)	4,525–4,500	Penn State	Men: Nick Bravin, Stanford Women: Olga Kalinovskaya, Penn State	Men: Ben Atkins, Columbia	Men: Thomas Strzalkowski, Penn State
1992	Notre Dame, IN	Columbia-Barnard	4,150–3,646	Penn State	Men: Nick Bravin, Stanford Women: Olga Chernyak, Penn State	Men: Harold Bauder, Wayne State	Men: Thomas Strzalkowski, Penn State
1991	University Park, PA	Penn State (2)	4,700–4,200	Columbia-Barnard	Men: Ben Akins, Columbia Women: Heidi Piper, Notre Dame	Men: Marc Oshima, Columbia	Men: Vitali Nazlimov, Penn State
1990	Notre Dame, IN	Penn State	36–35	Columbia-Barnard	Men: Nick Bravin, Stanford Women: Tzu Moy, Columbia-Barnard	Men: Jubba Beshin, Notre Dame	Men: David Mandell, Columbia

=== Separate team championships (1982–1989) ===
Year	Team	Venue	Team Champions			Individual Champions		
Year	Team	Venue	Team Champion	Score	Team Runner-Up	Foil	Épée	Sabre
1989	Men	Evanston, IL	Columbia	88–85	Penn State	Men: Edward Mufel, Penn State Women: Yasemin Opcu, Wayne State	Men: Jon Normile, Columbia	Men: Peter Cox, Penn State
1989	Women	Evanston, IL	Wayne State	(3–0)–(2–1)	Columbia-Barnard	Men: Edward Mufel, Penn State Women: Yasemin Opcu, Wayne State	Men: Jon Normile, Columbia	Men: Peter Cox, Penn State
1988	Men	Princeton, NJ	Columbia	90–83	Notre Dame	Men: Marc Kent, Columbia Women: Molly Sullivan, Notre Dame	Men: Jon Normile, Columbia	Men: Robert Cottingham, Columbia
1988	Women	Princeton, NJ	Wayne State	(3–0)–(2–1)	Notre Dame	Men: Marc Kent, Columbia Women: Molly Sullivan, Notre Dame	Men: Jon Normile, Columbia	Men: Robert Cottingham, Columbia
1987	Men	Notre Dame, IN	Columbia	86–78	Penn	Men: William Mindel, Columbia Women: Caitlin Bilodeaux, Columbia-Barnard	Men: James O'Neill, Harvard	Men: Michael Lofton, NYU
1987	Women	Notre Dame, IN	Notre Dame	(3–0)–(2–1)	Temple	Men: William Mindel, Columbia Women: Caitlin Bilodeaux, Columbia-Barnard	Men: James O'Neill, Harvard	Men: Michael Lofton, NYU
1986	Men	Princeton, NJ	Notre Dame	151–141	Columbia	Men: Adam Feldman, Penn State Women: Molly Sullivan, Notre Dame	Men: Chris O'Loughlin, Pennsylvania	Men: Michael Lofton, NYU
1986	Women	Princeton, NJ	Penn	(3–0)–(2–1)	Notre Dame	Men: Adam Feldman, Penn State Women: Molly Sullivan, Notre Dame	Men: Chris O'Loughlin, Pennsylvania	Men: Michael Lofton, NYU
1985	Men	Notre Dame, IN	Wayne State	141–140	Notre Dame	Men: Stephan Chauvel, Wayne State Women: Caitlin Bilodeaux, Columbia-Barnard	Men: Ettore Bianchi, Wayne State	Men: Michael Lofton, NYU
1985	Women	Notre Dame, IN	Yale	(3–0)–(2–1)	Penn	Men: Stephan Chauvel, Wayne State Women: Caitlin Bilodeaux, Columbia-Barnard	Men: Ettore Bianchi, Wayne State	Men: Michael Lofton, NYU
1984	Men	Princeton, NJ	Wayne State	69–50	Penn State	Men: Charles Higgs-Coulthard, Notre Dame Women: Mary Jane O'Neill, Penn	Men: Ettore Bianchi, Wayne State	Men: Michael Lofton, NYU
1984	Women	Princeton, NJ	Yale	(3–0)–(2–1)	Penn State	Men: Charles Higgs-Coulthard, Notre Dame Women: Mary Jane O'Neill, Penn	Men: Ettore Bianchi, Wayne State	Men: Michael Lofton, NYU
1983	Men	Somers, WI	Wayne State	86–80	Notre Dame	Men: Demetrios Valsamis, NYU Women: Jana Angelakis, Penn State	Men: Ola Harstrom, Notre Dame	Men: John Friedberg, North Carolina
1983	Women	University Park, PA	Penn State	(5–0)–(3–2)	Wayne State	Men: Demetrios Valsamis, NYU Women: Jana Angelakis, Penn State	Men: Ola Harstrom, Notre Dame	Men: John Friedberg, North Carolina
1982	Men	Notre Dame, IN	Wayne State	85–77	Clemson	Men: Alexander Flom, George Mason Women: Joy Ellingson, San Jose State	Men: Peter Schifrin, San Jose State	Men:Neil Hick, Wayne State
1982	Women	San Jose, CA	Wayne State	(7–0)–(6–1)	San Jose State	Men: Alexander Flom, George Mason Women: Joy Ellingson, San Jose State	Men: Peter Schifrin, San Jose State	Men:Neil Hick, Wayne State

=== Men's-only team championships (1941–1981) ===
Year	Venue	Team Champions			Individual Champions		
Year	Venue	Team Champion	Score	Team Runner-Up	Foil	Épée	Sabre
1981	Somers, WI	Penn	113–111	Wayne State	Men: Ernest Simon, Wayne State	Men: Gil Pezza, Wayne State	Men: Paul Friedberg, Penn
1980	University Park, PA	Wayne State	111–106	Penn; MIT	Men: Ernest Simon, Wayne State	Men: Gil Pezza, Wayne State	Men: Paul Friedberg, Penn
1979	Princeton, NJ	Wayne State	119–108	Notre Dame	Men: Andrew Bonk, Notre Dame	Men: Carlos Songini, Cleveland State	Men: Yuri Rabinovich, Wayne State
1978	Somers, WI	Notre Dame	121–110	Penn	Men: Ernest Simon, Wayne State	Men: Björne Väggö, Notre Dame	Men: Mike Sullivan, Notre Dame
1977	Notre Dame, IN	Notre Dame	114–114 (fence-off)	NYU	Men: Pat Gerard, Notre Dame	Men: Hans Wieselgren, NYU	Men: Mike Sullivan, Notre Dame
1976	Philadelphia, PA	NYU	79–77	Wayne State	Men: Greg Benko, Wayne State	Men: Randy Eggleton, Pennsylvania	Men: Brian Smith, Columbia
1975	Fullerton, CA	Wayne State	89–83	Cornell	Men: Greg Benko, Wayne State	Men: Risto Hurme, NYU	Men: Yuri Rabinovich, Wayne State
1974	Cleveland, OH	NYU	92–87	Wayne State	Men: Greg Benko, Wayne State	Men: Risto Hurme, NYU	Men: Steve Danosi, Wayne State
1973	Baltimore, MD	NYU	76–71	Penn	Men: Brooke Makler, Pennsylvania	Men: Risto Hurme, NYU	Men: Peter Westbrook, NYU
1972	Chicago, IL	Detroit	73–70	NYU	Men: Tyrone Simmons, Detroit	Men: Ernesto Fernández, Pennsylvania	Men: Bruce Soriano, Columbia
1971	USAF Academy, CO	NYU; Columbia	68–68	tie	Men: Tyrone Simmons, Detroit	Men: George Szunyogh, NYU	Men: Bruce Soriano, Columbia
1970	Notre Dame, IN	NYU	71–63	Columbia	Men: Walter Krause, NYU	Men: John Nadas, Case Reserve	Men: Bruce Soriano, Columbia
1969	Raleigh, NC	Penn	54–43	Harvard	Men: Anthony Kestler, Columbia	Men: James Wetzler, Pennsylvania	Men: Norman Braslow, Penn
1968	Detroit, MI	Columbia	92–87	NYU	Men: Gerard Esponda, San Francisco	Men: Don Sieja, Cornell	Men: Todd Makler, Penn
1967	Northridge, CA	NYU	72–64	Penn	Men: Mike Gaylor, NYU	Men: George Masin, NYU	Men: Todd Makler, Penn
1966	Durham, NC	NYU	(5–0)–(5–2)	Army	Men: Al Davis, NYU	Men: Bernhardt Hermann, Iowa	Men: Paul Apostol, NYU
1965	Detroit, MI	Columbia	76–74	NYU	Men: Joe Nalven, Columbia	Men: Paul Pesthy, Rutgers	Men: Howard Goodman, NYU
1964	Cambridge, Massachusetts	Princeton	81–79	NYU	Men: Bill Hicks, Princeton	Men: Paul Pesthy, Rutgers	Men: Craig Bell, Illinois
1963	USAF Academy, CO	Columbia	55–50	Navy	Men: Jay Lustig, Columbia	Men: Larry Crum, Navy	Men: Bela Szentivanyi, Wayne State
1962	Columbus, OH	Navy	76–74	NYU	Men: Herbert Cohen, NYU	Men: Thane Hawkins, Navy	Men: Barton Nisonson, Columbia
1961	Princeton, NJ	NYU	79–68	Princeton	Men: Herbert Cohen, NYU	Men: Jerry Halpern, NYU	Men: Israel Colon, NYU
1960	Champaign, IL	NYU	65–57	Navy	Men: Gene Glazer, NYU	Men: Gil Eisner, NYU	Men: Mike D’Asaro, NYU
1959	Annapolis, MD	Navy	72–65	NYU	Men: Joe Paletta, Navy	Men: Roland Wommack, Navy	Men: Al Morales, Navy
1958	Lubbock, TX	Illinois	47–43	Columbia	Men: Bruce Davis, Wayne State	Men: Roland Wommack, Navy	Men: Art Schankin, Illinois
1957	Detroit, MI	NYU	65–64	Columbia	Men: Bruce Davis, Wayne State	Men: James Margolis, Columbia	Men: Bernie Balaban, NYU
1956	Annapolis, MD	Illinois	90–88	Columbia	Men: Ralph DeMarco, Columbia	Men: Kinmont Hoitsma, Princeton	Men: Gerald Kaufman, Columbia
1955	East Lansing, MI	Columbia	62–57	Cornell	Men: Herman Velasco, Illinois	Men: Donald Tadrawski, Notre Dame	Men: Barry Pariser, Columbia
1954	Chicago, IL	Columbia; NYU	61–61	tie	Men: Robert Goldman, Pennsylvania	Men: Henry Kolowrat, Princeton	Men: Steve Sobel, Columbia
1953	Philadelphia, PA	Penn	94–86	Navy	Men: Ed Nober, Brooklyn College	Men: Jack Tori, Pennsylvania	Men: Robert Parmacek, Penn
1952	New Haven, CT	Columbia	71–69	NYU	Men: Harold Goldsmith, CCNY	Men: Herman W. Wallner, NYU	Men: Frank Zimolzak, Navy
1951	Champaign, IL	Columbia	69–64	Penn	Men: Robert Nielsen, Columbia	Men: Daniel Chafetz, Columbia	Men: Chambless Johnston, Princeton
1950	Detroit, MI	Navy	67½–66½	NYU; Rutgers	Men: Robert Nielsen, Columbia	Men: Thomas Stuart, Navy	Men: Alex Treves, Rutgers
1949	West Point, NY	Army; Rutgers	63–63	tie	Men: Ralph Tedeschi, Rutgers	Men: Richard Bowman, Army	Men: Alex Treves, Rutgers
1948	Annapolis, MD	CCNY	30–28	Navy	Men: Albert Axelrod, CCNY	Men: William Bryan, Navy	Men: James Day, Navy
1947	Chicago, IL	NYU	72–50½	Chicago	Men: Abraham Balk, NYU	Men: Abraham Balk, NYU	Men: Oscar Parsons, Temple
1943–1946	Championship not held due to World War II						
1942	St. Louis, MO	Ohio State	34–33½	St. John's	Men: Byron Krieger, Wayne State	Men: Ben Burtt, Ohio State	Men: Andre Deladrier, St. John's
1941	Columbus, OH	Northwestern	28½–27	Illinois	Men: Edward McNamara, Northwestern	Men: Chester H. Boland, Illinois	Men: William Meyer, Dartmouth

- Note: Team scoring in 1990 was based on weapon team events standings. From 1991 to 1994, point values increased due to fencers not qualifying as part of a team being able to contribute points from individual performances. Weapon team events were eliminated in 1995, and team scoring was based entirely on individual performances; women's épée was added as a fifth weapon. Since 1998, team scoring has been based on a one-point system; women's sabre was added as a sixth weapon in 2000.

== Champions ==
=== Team ===
Team	Titles	Coed	Men	Women
Notre Dame	16	10	4	2
Columbia	16	5	11 (2 shared)	0
Penn State	14	13	–	1
NYU	12	–	12 (2 shared)	–
Wayne State (MI)	10	–	7	3
Ohio State	4	3	1	–
Navy	3	–	3	–
Penn	3	–	2	1
Harvard	2	2	–	–
Princeton	2	1	1	–
Illinois	2	–	2	–
Yale	2	–	–	2
St. John's (NY)	1	1	–	–
Army	1	–	1 (shared)	–
CCNY	1	–	1	–
Detroit Mercy	1	–	1	–
Northwestern	1	–	1	–
Rutgers	1	–	1 (shared)	–

== See also ==
- List of NCAA fencing schools
- Collegiate fencing
- AIAW Intercollegiate Women's Fencing Champions
- Pre-NCAA Men's Fencing Champions
- Pre-NCAA Women's Fencing Champions
- USFA Division I National Championship
- Ivy League Fencing Championships
