= Paul Makler =

Paul Makler may refer to:

- Paul Makler Sr. (1920–2022), American fencer at the 1952 Summer Olympics
- Paul Makler Jr. (born 1946), son of Paul Makler, Sr., fenced at the 1972 Summer Olympics
