= Wayne State =

Wayne State may refer to:

- Wayne State College, Wayne, Nebraska
  - Wayne State Wildcats, the athletic program of Wayne State College
- Wayne State University, Detroit, Michigan
  - Wayne State Warriors, the athletic program of Wayne State University
