= Danilo Furundzic =

Serbian architect

Danilo S. Furundzic
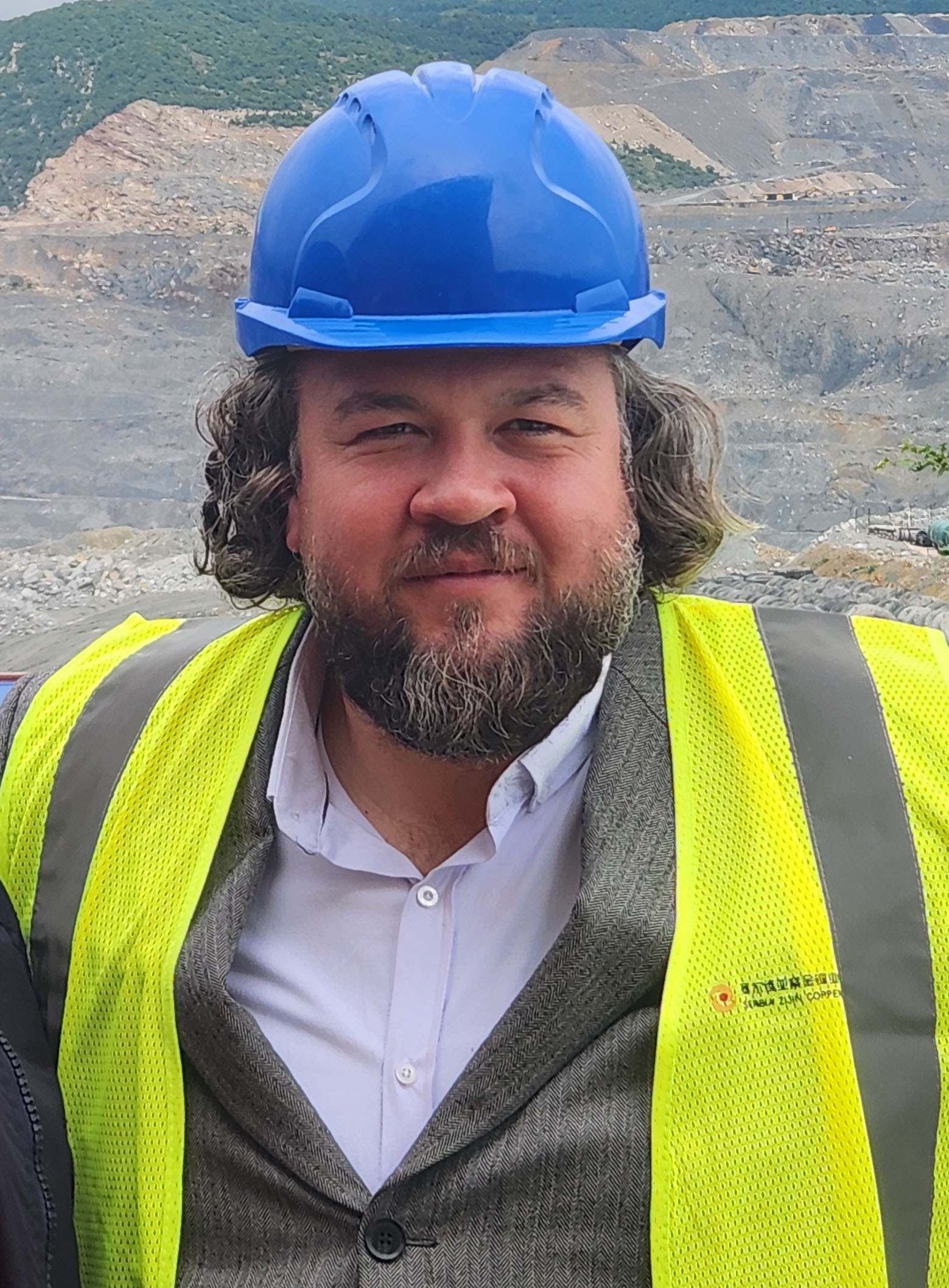
- Born: 1980 (age 45–46); Belgrade, Serbia
- Education: University of Belgrade – Faculty of Architecture (Dipl. Ing. Arch, 2004; PhD, 2017) École Centrale Paris (Postgraduate, 2006)
- Title: Associate Professor (Department of Urbanism)

Danilo S. Furundzic, is a Serbian architect, urban planner, and an associate professor at the University of Belgrade Faculty of Architecture. His professional activities encompass investment consulting, urban transport systems, and the optimization of public sector infrastructure.

== Early life and education ==
Danilo S. Furundzic was born in 1980 in Belgrade, Serbia. He completed his secondary education at the Mathematical Grammar School in Belgrade and graduated from the University of Belgrade Faculty of Architecture in 2004. From 2005 to 2006, he pursued postgraduate studies in industrial engineering at École Centrale Paris in France.

Furundzic returned to the University of Belgrade to pursue doctoral studies, defending his PhD thesis in 2017. His dissertation focused on the economic valuation of planned density measures in urban mixed-use residential areas. This research was recognized with an annual award from the Serbian Chamber of Commerce.

== Career ==
Furundzic began his academic career at the University of Belgrade Faculty of Architecture as an assistant professor, from 2017 to 2022. In 2022, he was promoted to associate professor in the Department of Urbanism. His research interests include brownfield regeneration, sustainable urban mobility, and smart city frameworks. Furundzic is the executive director of the Foundation for Solving the Housing Needs of Young Scientific Researchers at the University of Belgrade, where he manages institutional asset administration and housing programs for the university's research community. Between 2004 and 2008, he participated in international studies and cost-effectiveness analyses conducted in Belgrade, Paris, and Kuwait. He holds five professional engineering licenses and has acted as a certified court expert as well as chairperson of municipal spatial and urban planning drafting committees.

Furundzic has been involved in municipal utility restructuring and infrastructure cost-optimization initiatives within the public sector. From 2015 to 2019, he managed strategic infrastructure projects for public utilities in Serbia, including as chief executive officer of the Public Company for Utility and Infrastructure Services of Kikinda. He was awarded the regional Kapetan Miša Anastasijević charter in recognition of his contributions to public entrepreneurship.

== Publication ==
• Infrastructure Transport- The Future of Urban Transport and Infrastructure.

• Independent Railway System–Metro System–The Belgrade Metro Project.

== Awards ==
• In 2004, Furundzic received the Student of the Year Award, presented for a doctoral dissertation defended at the University of Belgrade.

• He received the Serbian Chamber of Commerce award for his doctoral thesis.
