= Kathleen Walsh =

Kathleen Walsh may refer to:

- Kathleen E. Walsh, president and CEO of Boston Medical Center
- Kay Walsh (1911–2005), actress and dancer
- Kate Walsh (actress) (born 1967), American actress and businesswoman
- Kathleen Walsh, character in Medium played by Molly Ringwald
- Kathleen Walsh (camogie) in All-Ireland Senior Camogie Championship 1932

== See also ==
- Kathy Walsh (disambiguation)
- Kate Walsh (disambiguation)
- Catherine Walsh (disambiguation)
