= Kathy Walsh =

Kathy Walsh may refer to:

- Kathy Walsh (horse trainer), of Sarah's Secret
- Kathy Walsh, character in The Alphabet Killer

== See also ==
- Catherine Walsh (disambiguation)
- Kathleen Walsh (disambiguation)
