= 2020 Harvard fencing scandal =

Bribery scandal at Harvard University

In December 2020, Jie "Jack" Zhao and former head fencing coach Peter Brand were indicted by a grand jury on accusations of conspiracy and bribery for Zhao's two sons to be accepted at Harvard University. They were accused of exchanging more than $1.5 million in bribes.

However, both brothers were athletic and academic standouts prior to their recruitment and competed at meets throughout their tenure on the team. Additionally, Eric Zhao served as the team captain of Harvard Fencing (chosen by the team via popular vote).

By the jury's unanimous decision, both Jie "Jack" Zhao and Peter Brand were cleared of all charges on December 21, 2022. The jury deliberated for only five hours before returning the not guilty verdicts.

== Fencing ==
NCAA fencing involves the best recruited college fencers around the U.S.

Fencing is an NCAA sport. Top fencers around the nation have the opportunity to be recruited to a college, often slightly or significantly boosting their chances of acceptance with the opportunity to receive a scholarship. Top universities like MIT, Boston College, and The Ohio State University all have both men's and women's NCAA fencing teams.

== Conspiracy Accusation ==
Maryland businessman Jie "Jack" Zhao and Harvard's former head fencing coach Peter Brand connected for years before Harvard accepted either of Zhao's sons. Over the course of five years, Zhao was accused of paying for Brand's car, part of Brand's son's college tuition at Penn State, the mortgage on Brand's house, Brand's water and sewer bills, and renovations for Brand's new house. In total, Zhao had been accused of spending over $1.5 million in alleged bribes. In 2016, Zhao bought Brand's house for twice as much as its initial value, paying almost $1 million. Zhao never lived in the house and later sold it for $665,000.

However, the defense was able to prove that the entire sum of money in question were loans to Brand that had already been paid back in full with interest to Zhao by 2021.

Zhao and Brand began communicating in 2012 when Brand told co-conspirator Alexandre Ryjik that Jack doesn't need to take him anywhere and his boys don't have to be great fencers, and what Brand needed is a good incentive to recruit the boys. Ryjik was initially labeled as "co-conspirator 1," or "CC1," in the criminal complaint, but eventually, the Boston Globe identified him as a coach for the Virginia Academy of Fencing. Brand later told Ryjik that he simply needed a "good incentive" to recruit Zhao's sons. Zhao's company allegedly bought Ryjik his 40,000-square-foot building and property and gave about $1 million to Ryjik's fencing foundation. According to prosecutors, Zhao spent about $2.4 million because the co-conspirator took $900,000 of Zhao's money, including more than $31,000 of Zhao's sons' college tuition money. Zhao had a plan to donate $1 million to Ryjik, which would then be passed to a charity organization controlled by Brand. Zhao ultimately paid $100,000 to Brand's charity foundation.

The situation was brought to light on April 1, 2019, when "Harvard was made aware of allegations involving Peter Brand." On April 4, 2019, Harvard's Dean of the Faculty of Arts and Sciences publicly released a statement regarding these allegations, revealing that the admissions process involves a vote of approximately 40 committee members and an interview with the student-athlete.

On July 6, 2019, former athletic director Bob Scalise said in an emailed statement that Harvard had fired Brand due to a violation of their conflict-of-interest policy; "conflict of interest exists when individual commitment to the University may be compromised by personal benefit."

Both Zhao and Brand denied the allegations against them, saying both sons academically and athletically stood out. According to Zhao's attorney, William Weinrub, Zhao did not give anybody money for their acceptance to Harvard.

This case is separate from the infamous Operation Varsity Blues scandal. Zhao and Rick Singer, the driver of the famous scandal, have no connection to one another. Although some people have drawn parallels to the two situations, as both scandals involved parents bribing somebody to get their children into college, there are several differences between the two cases. For example, both of Zhao's sons had high standardized test scores and had a track record of fencing for many years prior to applying to Harvard. Additionally, there was no legal agreement between Zhao and a Harvard University employee which guaranteed that the brothers would be admitted to the university in exchange for financial compensation.

== Recruitment ==
According to court testimony from David L. Evans, a Harvard admissions officer with over 50 years of experience, Brand's athletic designation of the Zhao brothers "made the difference" in their admission. Evans further testified that the brothers' “personal qualities” and extracurricular activities were “nothing special” in comparison to other applicants.

Zhao's older son, Eric, enrolled at Harvard in the fall of 2014. During his time at Harvard, Eric was elected captain of the Harvard fencing team by his peers and was named second-team All-Ivy after helping Harvard win the 2018 Ivy League Championships. Edward, Zhao's younger son, enrolled at Harvard in 2017. Prior to the cancellation of the 2020 fencing season due to the COVID-19 pandemic, Edward posted a 27–24 record during his career on Harvard's fencing team

Eric had already graduated from the university at the time of arrest, while Edward was in his final year of his undergraduate studies. In an interview with Eric, he said he had no knowledge of the donation.
