= Sarah's Secret =

American-bred Thoroughbred racehorse

- Sire: Leroidesanimaux
- Grandsire: Candy Stripes
- Dam: Sarasota
- Damsire: Luhuk
- Sex: Mare
- Foaled: 2008
- Country: United States
- Color: Chestnut
- Breeder: Joan Hadley Thoroughbreds
- Owner: Joan Hadley Thoroughbreds & Kirkwood Al and Sandee
- Trainer: Kathy Walsh
- Record: 8: 4–0–1
- Earnings: $197,000

Major wins
- Honeymoon Handicap (2011)

Sarah's Secret (foaled March 20, 2008, in Kentucky) is an American Thoroughbred racehorse.

She was owned by Joan Hadley Thoroughbreds and trained by Kathy Walsh. David Flores rode Sarah's Secret in her first three starts. In her fourth start she was ridden by Rafael Bejarano.

Sarah's Secret was sired by Leroidesanimaux, who also sired in the same season as 2011 Kentucky Derby winner Animal Kingdom. She is out of Luhuk's mare Sarasota.

== 2010 season ==
On August 22, 2010, Sarah's Secret won her first start and defeated only 4 other fillies. She broke her maiden in a Maiden Special Weight going 5 1/2 furlongs at Del Mar. She was ridden by David Flores and won by 1 1/2 lengths over the favorite May Day Rose.

On October 7, 2010, Sarah's Secret won a 6 1/2 furlongs allowance race by 1/2 of a length.

== 2011 season ==
On May 1, 2011, Sarah's Secret won a 6-furlong allowance race by 1 3/4 lengths. This time she raced on turf. She was ridden by David Flores, carrying 122 lbs.

On June 11, 2011, Sarah's Secret got her first stakes win in the Honeymoon Handicap, defeating the favorite Star Billing. She was ridden by Rafael Bejarano for the first time. She won the race by 1/2 of a length.

On July 24, 2011, Sarah's Secret run in San Clemente Handicap as a favorite, but she finished 6th.

Retired from racing, at the November 2012 Keeneland sale she was purchased for $185,000 as a broodmare prospect by William S. Farish III to stand at his Lane's End Farm near Lexington, Kentucky.

== Career statistics ==
| Finish | Jockey | Race | 1st | 2nd | 3rd | Time |
|---|---|---|---|---|---|---|
| 1st | Rafael Bejarano | Honeymoon Handicap | Sarah's Secret | Star Billing | Cambina | 1:50.04 |
| 1st | David Flores | Allow | Sarah's Secret | Camille C | Sugarinthemorning | 1:08.44 |
| 1st | David Flores | Allow | Sarah's Secret | Tales In Excess | Swiss Wild Cat | 1:16.24 |
| 1st | David Flores | MSW | Sarah's Secret | May Day Rose | Intentional | 1:04.50 |

== Pedigree ==
Pedigree of Sarah's Secret (USA), Chestnut filly, 2008
| Sire Leroidesanimaux 2000 | Candy Stripes; 1982 | Blushing Groom | Red God |
| Sire Leroidesanimaux 2000 | Candy Stripes; 1982 | Blushing Groom | Runaway Bride |
| Sire Leroidesanimaux 2000 | Candy Stripes; 1982 | Bubble Company | Lyphard |
| Sire Leroidesanimaux 2000 | Candy Stripes; 1982 | Bubble Company | Prodice |
| Sire Leroidesanimaux 2000 | Dissemble; 1989 | Ahonoora | Lorenzaccio |
| Sire Leroidesanimaux 2000 | Dissemble; 1989 | Ahonoora | High Line |
| Sire Leroidesanimaux 2000 | Dissemble; 1989 | Kerali | Boulevard |
| Sire Leroidesanimaux 2000 | Dissemble; 1989 | Kerali | Sookera |
| Dam Sarasota 2000 | Luhuk; 1991 | Forty Niner (horse) | Mr. Prospector |
| Dam Sarasota 2000 | Luhuk; 1991 | Forty Niner (horse) | File |
| Dam Sarasota 2000 | Luhuk; 1991 | Royal Stance | Dr. Fager |
| Dam Sarasota 2000 | Luhuk; 1991 | Royal Stance | Royal Statute |
| Dam Sarasota 2000 | Sandals; 1995 | Southern Halo | Halo |
| Dam Sarasota 2000 | Sandals; 1995 | Southern Halo | Northern Sea |
| Dam Sarasota 2000 | Sandals; 1995 | Sarawak | Salt Marsh |
| Dam Sarasota 2000 | Sandals; 1995 | Sarawak | Sun Lounge |
