= Atlantic Coast Conference Fencing Championships =

American college fencing tournament

- Sport: College fencing
- Founded: 1971 (Reinstated 2015)
- Country: United States
- Most recent champion: Men's: Notre Dame (8) Women's: Notre Dame (9)
- Website: https://theacc.com/sports/fencing

The Atlantic Coast Conference Fencing Championship is an annual college tournament to determine the team standings for the ACC teams sponsoring fencing (of which there are currently five: Boston College, Duke, North Carolina, Notre Dame, and Stanford). Individual and team tournaments for both women and men have been held annually since 2015. There was a previous incarnation of the tournament (for men only) which was held between 1971 and 1980. At that point, a number of ACC schools stopped sponsoring fencing, and participation fell below the level necessary to hold a conference championship. The tournament was reinstated (with a women's edition) in 2015, after Notre Dame, which had previously sponsored fencing in a different conference, joined the ACC in most sports.

== Men's results ==
	Champion	2nd Place	3rd Place	4th Place	5th Place	6th Place
2025	Notre Dame (8)	North Carolina	Boston College / Duke / Stanford			
2024	North Carolina (9)	Notre Dame	Duke	Boston College		
2023	Notre Dame (7)	Boston College	Duke	North Carolina		
2022	Notre Dame (6)	Boston College	Duke	North Carolina		
2021	Duke (2)	North Carolina	Boston College			
2020	Notre Dame (5)	Duke	North Carolina	Boston College		
2019	Notre Dame (4)	Duke	North Carolina	Boston College		
2018	Duke (1)	Notre Dame	North Carolina	Boston College		
2017	Notre Dame (3)	Duke	North Carolina	Boston College		
2016	Notre Dame (2)	Duke	North Carolina	Boston College		
2015	Notre Dame (1)	Duke	Boston College	North Carolina		
1981-2014	Not contested					
1980	North Carolina (8)	Clemson	Maryland Tied for 2nd	NC State	Virginia	Duke
1979	Clemson (1)					
1978	Maryland (1)	Clemson	North Carolina	NC State	Virginia	Duke
1977	North Carolina (7)					
1976	North Carolina (6)	Maryland	NC State	Clemson	Duke	Virginia
1975	North Carolina (5)	Maryland	Duke	NC State	Virginia	Clemson
1974	North Carolina (4)					
1973	North Carolina (3)					
1972	North Carolina (2)					
1971	North Carolina (1)	Duke	NC State	Virginia	Clemson	

== Women's results ==
	Champion	2nd Place	3rd Place	4th Place	5th Place
2025	Notre Dame (9)	Duke	Boston College	Stanford	North Carolina
2024	Notre Dame (8)	Duke	Boston College	North Carolina	
2023	Notre Dame (7)	Duke	North Carolina	Boston College	
2022	Notre Dame (6)	Duke	North Carolina	Boston College	
2021	Duke (1)	North Carolina	Boston College		
2020	Notre Dame (5)	North Carolina	Duke	Boston College	
2019	Notre Dame (4)	Duke	North Carolina	Boston College	
2018	North Carolina (1)	Notre Dame	Duke	Boston College	
2017	Notre Dame (3)	Duke	North Carolina	Boston College	
2016	Notre Dame (2)	Duke	North Carolina	Boston College	
2015	Notre Dame (1)	Duke	North Carolina	Boston College	
