= Nick Bravin =

American fencer (born 1971)

Personal information
- Born: Eric Oliver Bravin; May 28, 1971 (age 55) Los Angeles, California, United States
- Height: 5 ft 10 in (178 cm)
- Weight: 181 lb (82 kg)

Sport
- Country: United States
- Sport: Fencing
- Event: Foil
- College team: Stanford University
- Coached by: Zoran Tulum
Medal record
Representing United States
Pan American Games
Silver medal – second place	1991 Havana	Team foil
Silver medal – second place	1995 Mar del Plata	Team foil
Bronze medal – third place	1991 Havana	Individual foil
Bronze medal – third place	1995 Mar del Plata	Individual foil

Eric Oliver "Nick" Bravin (born May 28, 1971) is an American fencer and lawyer. He was a four-time U.S. National Champion, a three-time NCAA National Champion, and a two-time Olympian.

== Early life ==
Bravin is Jewish, and was born in Los Angeles, California. His mother is Shawn Bravin. His older brother fenced, and his grandfather had been a top fencer in Lithuania. His maternal grandfather was murdered by the Nazis in the Vilna Ghetto or the killing fields of the Ponari forest just outside Vilnius, Lithuania.

Bravin began fencing at the age of 12 at the Westside Fencing Center in Culver City, California. He graduated in 1988 from Hamilton High School, where he played for the football team. In the late 1980s, he moved to Palo Alto, California.

== Fencing career ==
He competed in the foil events at the 1992 Olympics in Barcelona, and the 1996 Summer Olympics in Atlanta.

At Stanford University, where he majored in human biology and from which he graduated in 1993, Bravin was three-time NCAA foil champion (1990, ’92, and ’93), as he had a college record of 208 victories and 5 defeats, and won four All-America awards. Bravin won four US National foil championships: in 1991 (at age 20, the youngest to win the championship), 1992 (beating three-time Olympian Michael Marx, 5-3, 2-5, 6-4), 1994, and 1996 (defeating Cliff Bayer), while coming in 2nd in 1995, and 1999 (losing the title by one touch).

He was on the US Pan American Teams in 1991 and ’95, and won two team silver medals as well as two individual bronze medals. He was the Pan-American Fencing Champion as both a junior and a senior. Bravin was elected to the US Fencing Hall of Fame.

He was featured in the cover story of the May 1996, issue of Vanity Fair magazine.

In 2006, he was inducted into the Southern California Jewish Sports Hall of Fame. In 2010, he was inducted into the Stanford Athletics Hall of Fame.

== Legal career ==
Bravin continued on to a legal career, graduating from Columbia Law School, where he was a member of the Columbia Law Review, with a JD in 1998. Bravin was a law clerk for Judge David M. Ebel of the United States Court of Appeals for the Tenth Circuit, and for Justice Ruth Bader Ginsburg of the United States Supreme Court.

He was an Acting Assistant Professor of Lawyering for four years at New York University School of Law. He has practiced in every level of federal and state court, as well as in mediations, arbitrations, and internal investigations. His work has focused on criminal matters, including representation of the individual initially named as "a person of interest" in the anthrax mailings of 2001. Bravin is of counsel to the Ellsworth Law Firm, where he works primarily on criminal and appellate cases. Bravin has also taught Separation of Powers Law at U.C. Berkeley's School of Law, and Constitutional Law at the University of California's Washington Program. He writes on legal and non-legal issues, and his work has appeared in Foreign Policy magazine, Slate, and the Huffington Post.

== See also ==
- List of law clerks for the sixth seat of the Supreme Court of the United States
- List of select Jewish fencers
- List of NCAA fencing champions
- List of USFA Division I National Champions
- List of USFA Hall of Fame members
