= Vladimir Veličković =

Serbian painter (1935–2019)

Vladimir Veličković Владимир Величковић
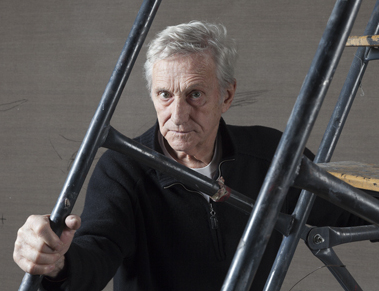
- Veličković in his studio in 2016
- Born: 11 August 1935; Belgrade, Kingdom of Yugoslavia
- Died: 29 August 2019 (aged 84); Split, Croatia
- Education: University of Belgrade
- Occupation: Artist
- Awards: Herder Prize (1987)

Vladimir Veličković (Serbian Cyrillic: Владимир Величковић; 11 August 1935 – 29 August 2019) was a Serbian painter who spent much of his adult life in Paris.

== Biography ==
Veličković graduated from the Faculty of Architecture at Belgrade University. From 1963 to 1966, he was an assistant in Krsto Hegedušić's master workshop in Zagreb. In 1965, he was honoured with a prize at the Biennale in Paris, where he moved to the following year. Veličković gained public attention in 1967 with an exhibition at the Galerie du Dragon in Paris, which established him as one of the leading artists of the Narrative Figuration art movement. In 1983 he was elected professor at the École nationale supérieure des Beaux-Arts in Paris, and taught there until 2000. In 1985 he was elected a member of Serbian Academy of Sciences and Arts (SANU) and Honorable doctor of science at University of Kragujevac. He was honoured with the highest French award in the field of culture and arts, the Commander of the Ordre des Arts et des Lettres. His paintings were exhibited in many countries in Europe and Americas since 1951.

Since 7 December 2005 he was a member of Académie des Beaux-Arts, section I, seat number 7.

In 2017 he signed the Declaration on the Common Language of the Croats, Serbs, Bosniaks and Montenegrins.

== Selected exhibitions ==
Veličković had many solo exhibitions in Europe, Asia and North America.

- Slovenj Gradec – Koroška galerija, 2012.
- Marseille – Galerie Anna-Tschopp, 2013.
- Belgrade – Serbian Academy of Sciences and Arts, 2013.
- Belgrade – Zepter Muzej, 2013.
- Colmar – Espace d'art contemporain André Malraux, 2013.
- Rijeka – Museum of Modern and Contemporary Art, 2013.
- Varna – Biennale internationale de l'Estampe, 2013.
- Val d'Isère – Galerie Jane Griffiths, 2014.
- Strasbourg – Galerie Nicole Buck, 2014.
- Lyon – Galerie Anne-Marie et Roland Pallade, 2014.
- Kragujevac – Galerie Rima, 2014.
- Montréal – Centre d'art le 1700 La Poste, 2015.
