= Alex Treves =

American fencer (1929–2020)

Personal information
- Full name: Alessandro Emanuele Treves
- Born: January 14, 1929 Turin, Italy
- Died: December 12, 2020 (aged 91) Monte Carlo, Monaco

Sport
- Sport: Fencing
- Event: Saber
- College team: Rutgers University
- Club: Salle Santelli

Alessandro Emanuele "Alex" Treves (January 14, 1929 – December 12, 2020) was an Italian-born American Olympic fencer. Treves was born in Turin, Italy, and was Jewish. He later lived in New York City.

== Career ==
Treves fenced for Salle Santelli. He fenced for Rutgers University (class of 1950), and won the National Collegiate Athletic Association (NCAA) saber title in both 1949 and 1950. Treves was undefeated in three years of competing in college. He competed for the United States at the 1950 Maccabiah Games.

Treves competed for the United States in the team sabre event at the 1952 Summer Olympics in Helsinki, and the team came in fourth. He won three Amateur Fencers League of America (AFLA) National Championships in team sabre; in 1952, 1955, and 1956. In 1953, Treves won the World Military Sabre Championship, and in 1954 he won the Italian University Sabre Championship. In 2000, Treves was elected to the Rutgers Sports Hall of Fame.

== See also ==
- List of NCAA fencing champions
