= Marcello Olivares =

American fencer (born 2001)

Personal information
- Born: April 4, 2001 (age 25)
- Home town: Cooper City, Florida, U.S.

Fencing career
- Sport: Fencing
- Country: United States
- Weapon: Foil
- Hand: Right-handed
Medal record
Men's foil
Representing the United States
World Championships
Bronze medal – third place	2026 Hong Kong	Team
Pan American Championships
Gold medal – first place	2026 Lima	Team
Silver medal – second place	2026 Lima	Individual

Marcello Olivares (born April 4, 2001) is an American right-handed foil fencer.

== Early life and education ==
Olivares graduated from Florida Virtual School in 2019. He then attended the University of Notre Dame where he was a member of the fencing team. He won the 2021 NCAA fencing championships individual foil championship, and helped Notre Dame win their 11th national championship in program history.

== Career ==
In June 2026, he represented the United States at the 2026 Pan American Fencing Championships and won a gold medal in the team foil event and a silver medal in the individual event.

== Personal life ==
Olivares was born to Maria Panyi and Frets Olivares, and has an older sister, Francesca, and a younger brother, Lucas. His mom attended Notre Dame and was a member of the 1994 NCAA Champion fencing team.
