= Roland Wommack =

American fencer (1936–2018)

Personal information
- Born: December 27, 1936 Philadelphia, Pennsylvania, United States
- Died: May 22, 2018 (aged 81)

Sport
- Sport: Fencing

Roland Wommack (December 27, 1936 – May 22, 2018) was an American fencer. He competed in the team épée event at the 1960 Summer Olympics and was an alternate for the same event at the 1964 Summer Olympics.

== See also ==
- List of NCAA fencing champions
