= Brooke Makler =

American fencer

Personal information
- Full name: Adrian Brooke Makler
- Born: March 16, 1951 Philadelphia, Pennsylvania, United States
- Died: August 29, 2010 (aged 59) Paris, France

Sport
- Country: USA
- Sport: Fencing
- Events: Foil, epee
- College team: University of Pennsylvania Quakers
- Club: Salle Csiszar

Adrian Brooke Makler (March 16, 1951 – August 29, 2010) was an American Olympic foil and épée fencer.

== Early and personal life ==
Makler was born in Philadelphia, Pennsylvania, and was Jewish. He was the son of Paul Makler, Sr., and the brother of Paul Makler, Jr., both of whom fenced for the United States at the Olympics.

== Fencing career ==
He competed for Salle Csiszar.

Makler fenced at the University of Pennsylvania (graduating in 1973) for the University of Pennsylvania Quakers, won the NCAA Championship in Foil in 1973, and was a Second Team All American in Foil in 1972 and a First Team All American in Foil in 1973. He was co-captain of the team in 1973, and was All-Ivy League First Team in 1971 and 1972.

He won gold medals for the US in team épée at the 1975 Pan American Games and the 1979 Pan American Games, and a silver medal in team foil at the 1975 Games.

Makler competed in the team foil and individual and team épée events at the 1976 Summer Olympics, at the age of 25.

He was National Amateur Fencers League of America Épée Champion in 1978.

== See also ==
- List of USFA Division I National Champions
- List of NCAA fencing champions
