= High school fencing =

Fencing at the high school level has varied in popularity.

== Europe ==
One notable series is the Leon Paul Junior Series (LPJS), established in 1986 to address the scarcity of youth fencing competitions. Over the years, the LPJS has expanded to include over 30 annual events nationwide, encompassing all three weapons and attracting more than 3,300 individual entries in 2014 alone.

In Scotland, the LPJS has facilitated numerous events, such as the Holyrood competition in Edinburgh. For instance, in March 2020, five fencers from the Shetland Fencing Club participated in this event, competing against top-ranked British fencers to gain valuable experience. Similarly, in 2017, Shetland fencers attended the Falkirk leg of the LPJS, with participants like Max Orr and Kieran Whyte achieving commendable results against strong competition.

== United States ==
Fencing was once a part of many schools' physical education (PE) curriculum, and many schools had clubs and would compete in inter-school tournaments. In the second half of the 20th century, fencing gradually faded from physical education curricula in the United States. This has been attributed to worries about 'weapons in schools' or that it requires expensive equipment. Fencers dispute the characterization of fencing foils as weapons since they fail to meet the applicable criteria - a tool of injury or destruction - since foils are engineered specifically to contact the human body without injury.

However, youth fencing has remained a club sport at some schools, and the last several years have seen an increase in fencing clubs and tournaments at the high school level. The United States Fencing Association has encouraged this through the Regional Youth Circuit program. High school fencing season is generally in winter.

High school fencing has also gained a renewed following in the United States, evidenced by the establishment of state leagues, and an increase in Junior level national competitors.

High school competitive fencing has grown significantly in the state of New Jersey, one of the few states where it remains a varsity sport. The league is growing steadily, and there are currently 55 varsity programs in the state. The New Jersey Interscholastic Fencing Association includes Montgomery High School, The Pingry School, Voorhees High School, and more.

Georgia in particular has seen growing interest in high school fencing. The Georgia High School Fencing League was founded in 2004 and in the 2013–14 season numbers 17 schools and over 350 fencers. Member schools hold their own practices and come together about once a month during the fall and winter seasons to fence other member schools, primarily in épée. Additionally, the On Guard High School League of Georgia was created to allow high school fencers to fence all three weapons (épée, foil and sabre). This league was formed in 2010 in the 2012–13 season numbered seven schools and over 150 fencers.

The North Carolina Fencing League has grown to include Chapel Hill High School, Elkin High School, Morehead High School, East Chapel Hill High School, the North Carolina School of Science and Mathematics, Bishop McGuinness High School in Kernersville, Cape Fear Fencing Association of Wilmington, Salem Academy, Epiphany School of Global Studies, Reynolds High School and even a non-North Carolina school, Carlisle Preparatory Academy in Martinsville, Virginia. The latest champion of the league is East Chapel Hill High.

The Great Lakes High School Fencing Conference, consisting of schools in Illinois, Wisconsin and Indiana, was founded in 1981. Current information about GLHSFC membership, rules and competition schedules can be found on the New Trier HS Fencing Team page.

There is also a detailed history of high school fencing in Illinois from 1903–2013, written by Robert Prueter, on the web site of the IHSA (Illinois High School Association) - "Fencing: A Long-time Illinois Sport".

== See also ==
- Collegiate fencing
