= Peter Schifrin =

American fencer and sculptor (born 1958)

Personal information
- Nationality: American
- Born: January 5, 1958 (age 68) Los Angeles, California, United States
- Height: 6 ft 2.5 in (189.2 cm)
- Weight: 185 lb (84 kg)

Sport
- Country: United States
- Sport: Fencing
- Event: epee
- College team: San Jose State University (BA); Boston University (MFA)
- Club: Fencing Center of San Jose
Medal record
Representing United States
NCAA Fencing Championships
| Gold medal – first place | 1982 South Bend | Épée |

Peter Schifrin (born January 5, 1958) is an American Olympic épée fencer and sculptor.

== Early and personal life ==
Schifrin was born in Los Angeles, California, lived in Santa Rosa, California, and is Jewish. His father was a professional artist. After attending San Jose State University, where he earned a BA as a fine arts major, he earned a Master of Fine Arts (MFA) from Boston University.

== Fencing career ==
Schifrin began fencing at age 13. While in high school he won the Junior National Épée Championship in both 1976 and 1977.

He attended and fenced for San Jose State University on a fencing scholarship from 1979 through 1982. There, Schifrin was a four-time All-American, and had a 266–35 win-loss record. He won the 1982 NCAA Épée National Championship—thereby becoming the university's first and only NCAA champion in men's fencing.

Schifrin represented the United States at the 1979 Pan American Games team, winning a gold medal, and competed at the 1979 Summer Universiade and the 1981 Summer Universiade. He won a silver medal in épée at the 1981 Maccabiah Games.

He competed in the team épée event at the 1984 Summer Olympics.

Schifrin was inducted into the San Jose State University Sports Hall of Fame, in the Class of 2005.

== Art career ==
Schifrin became a poet and an artist, trained in figurative and portrait sculpture, and began making textured works in both metal and clay. He has had multiple commissioned works in California: he designed and executed a bronze firefighter in San Ramon, a bronze "Wounded Man" for San Mateo's Performing Arts Center, and a set of bronze coyotes for downtown San Jose. Schifrin also created "Wings," a series of three sculptures installed on Martha's Vineyard. Schifrin and another sculptor, David Duskin, created "J-Line," which was commissioned by another fencing Olympian, Stephen Trevor, a private equity manager. He has works on display with the Art of the Olympians.

Schifrin also teaches as an instructor at the Academy of Art University in San Francisco. He was voted into the National Sculpture Society in 2011.

== See also ==
- List of NCAA fencing champions
