= John Friedberg =

American fencer

Personal information
- Born: March 9, 1961 (age 65) Baltimore, Maryland, United States

Sport
- Country: United States
- Sport: Fencing
- Event: Saber
- College team: University of North Carolina
- Now coaching: Fencing Club of Mercer County in New Jersey

Achievements and titles
- Olympic finals: 1992 U.S. Sabre Team Member
Medal record
Representing United States
Pan American Games
Gold medal – first place	1995 Mar del Plata	Team sabre
Silver medal – second place	1991 Havana	Team sabre

John Merrill Friedberg (born March 9, 1961) is an American Olympic saber fencer.

== Early and personal life ==
Friedberg was born in Baltimore, Maryland, and is Jewish. He is the younger brother of Olympic fencer Paul Friedberg. He lives in Robbinsville Township, New Jersey.

== Fencing career ==
Friedberg fenced for the University of North Carolina, took second in the NCAA Saber Championship in 1982, and won it as a senior in 1983. He was a three-time All American.

Friedberg won silver medal in team sabre at the 1991 Pan American Games and gold in the 1995 Pan American Games.

He competed in the team sabre event at the 1992 Summer Olympics. Friedberg came in second in the 1993 US Championship in sabre, and won the 1994 US Championship in sabre.

Friedberg founded and is head coach of the Fencing Club of Mercer County in New Jersey.

== See also ==
- List of USFA Division I National Champions
- List of NCAA fencing champions
