= Paul Friedberg =

American fencer (born 1959)

Personal information
- Full name: Paul Ronald Friedberg
- Nationality: American
- Born: December 14, 1959 (age 66) Baltimore, Maryland, U.S.
- Height: 5 ft 7 in (170 cm)
- Weight: 185 lb (84 kg)

Sport
- Country: United States
- Sport: Fencing
- Event: Saber
- College team: University of Pennsylvania Quakers
- Team: USA Men's Sabre Fencing Team

Achievements and titles
- Olympic finals: 1988 Olympics
- National finals: 1980 NCAA Fencing Championship
Medal record
Representing United States
Pan American Games
Gold medal – first place	1995 Mar del Plata	Team sabre
Silver medal – second place	1987 Indianapolis	Team sabre
Silver medal – second place	1991 Havana	Team sabre

Paul Ronald Friedberg (born December 14, 1959) is an American former fencer.

== Early and personal life ==
Friedberg was born in Baltimore, Maryland, and is Jewish. His brother is Olympic fencer John Friedberg.

== Fencing career ==
Fencing at the University of Pennsylvania for the University of Pennsylvania Quakers, Friedberg was four-time All-Ivy League, and a three-time All-American. He won the NCAA saber titles in 1979, 1980, and 1981. As a senior in 1981, Friedberg received the Class of 1915 Award, given to a senior class athlete who most closely approaches the ideal University of Pennsylvania student-athlete. He graduated with degrees from the University of Pennsylvania School of Engineering and Applied Science, and later earned an MBA from Penn's Wharton School of Business.

Friedberg won a gold medal at the 1981 Maccabiah Games. He competed at the 1983 Pan American Games, won silver medals in team saber at the 1987 Pan American Games and the 1991 Pan American Games, and won a gold medal in team saber at the 1995 Pan American Games.

He competed in the team sabre event at the 1988 Summer Olympics in Seoul. Friedberg was inducted into the Penn Athletic Hall of Fame in 1996.

== Miscellaneous ==
Friedberg appeared on season 29 of This Old House, renovating his house in Newton, Massachusetts.

== See also ==
- List of NCAA fencing champions
