= Leroidesanimaux =

Brazilian-bred Thoroughbred racehorse

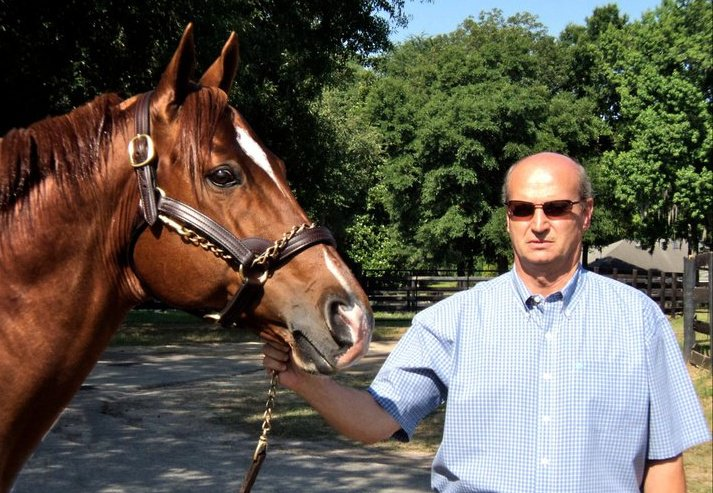
- Leroidesanimaux with George DeBenedicty.
- Sire: Candy Stripes
- Grandsire: Blushing Groom
- Dam: Dissemble
- Damsire: Ahonoora
- Sex: Stallion
- Foaled: September 27, 2000
- Died: May 27, 2016
- Country: Brazil
- Colour: Chestnut
- Breeder: Haras Bage Do Sul
- Owner: T N T Stud
- Trainer: Robert J. Frankel (USA)
- Record: 13: 9-2-0
- Earnings: $1,658,377

Major wins
- Citation Handicap (2004); Morvich Handicap (2004); Inglewood Handicap (2004); Frank E. Kilroe Mile Handicap (2005); Fourstardave Handicap (2005); Woodbine Mile (2005)

Awards
- American Champion Male Turf Horse (2005)
- Last updated on September 11, 2007

Leroidesanimaux (September 27, 2000 – May 27, 2016) was a Thoroughbred racehorse who competed in Brazil and was an Eclipse Award winner in the United States.

== Background ==
His name was four French-language words combined. Le roi des animaux translates as "The king of the animals."

Bred by Haras Bage Do Sul at Aceguá, Rio Grande do Sul, he was out of the mare Dissemble and sired by Candy Stripes who also sired Invasor, the horse ranked No.1 in the world for 2006.

== Racing career ==
=== 2002: Two-Year-Old season ===
At age two, Leroidesanimaux had a first and a second in three starts.

=== 2003: Three-Year-Old season ===
At three, he raced at Gávea Racetrack in Rio de Janeiro before being brought to the United States by owners T N T Stud (Goncalo Borges Torrealba and Regina Torrealba).

=== 2004: Four-Year-Old season ===
Racing in California for trainer Bobby Frankel, as a four-year-old Leroidesanimaux finished fourth in his American debut. He then won five consecutive races during which he set a track record for the 1 1/16-mile distance on turf in the Grade III Inglewood Handicap at Hollywood Park Racetrack. Among his other 2004 wins, Leroidesanimaux won the Grade I Citation Handicap.

=== 2005: Five-Year-Old season ===
In 2005, Leroidesanimaux had another highly successful year. He won the Grade I Frank E. Kilroe Mile Handicap at California's Santa Anita Park and followed this with a win in the Fourstardave Handicap at Saratoga Race Course in New York in which he set another track record for the 1 1/16-mile distance on turf. Shipped north to Woodbine Racetrack in Toronto, Ontario, Canada, Leroidesanimaux set the Woodbine Mile race record for the largest margin of victory at seven and three-quarter lengths while carrying the highest weight of any winner in the race's history.

Considered by many racing experts and fans as one of the best turf milers in years, Leroidesanimaux was sent off as the heavy betting favorite in the 2005 Breeders' Cup Mile. The morning of the race his handlers discovered the horse's feet were too sore to remove his training bar shoes and would have to compete without racing plates. In addition to sore feet and improper shoes, he drew the difficult outside post position eleven. Despite these obstacles, Leroidesanimaux still ran a strong race and finished second to Artie Schiller.

== Assessment ==
His overall performance in the 2005 racing season earned him the Eclipse Award for American Champion Male Turf Horse.

== Stud ==
Sold to Richard and Audrey Haisfield, Leroidesanimaux was retired to stud duty at their Stonewall Farm in Versailles, Kentucky. In 2013, it was announced that Leroidesanimaux would be moved to stud in England. He died in May 2016 at the age of 15 at Lanwades Stud in Newmarket from complications after a minor paddock accident.

=== Notable progeny ===
c = colt, f = filly, g = gelding

Foaled	Name	Sex	Major Wins
2008	Animal Kingdom	c	Kentucky Derby, Dubai World Cup
2015	Zaaki	g	Doomben Cup, Underwood Stakes, Mackinnon Stakes (twice)
