= Kate Walsh =

Kate Walsh or Katie Walsh may refer to:

- Kate Walsh (actress) (born 1967), American actress
- Kate Walsh (politician) (1947–2007), Irish politician
- Kate Walsh (businesswoman) (born 1981), businesswoman, contestant on The Apprentice (UK) series 5 and TV presenter
- Kate Walsh (singer) (born 1983), British singer
- Kate Richardson-Walsh (born 1980), English field hockey player
- Kate O'Beirne (Kate Walsh, 1949–2017), right-wing U.S. pundit, commentator and political analyst
- Katie Walsh (jockey) (born 1984), Irish jockey
- Katie Walsh (politician) (born 1984), American political operative and former White House Deputy Chief of Staff
- Kate Walsh (netball) (born 1992), Australian and English netball player

== See also ==
- Catherine Walsh (disambiguation)
- Kathleen Walsh (disambiguation)
