= Zoran Tulum =

Yugoslavian-American fencer and coach

Zoran R. Tulum
Personal information
- Born: 1956 (age 69–70) Belgrade, Yugoslavia (now Serbia)
- Education: University of Belgrade
- Years active: 1970s–present
- Other interests: Architechure
- Website: zetafencing.com

Sport
- Sport: Fencing
- Now coaching: Nick Bravin; Eli Dershwitz
- Updated on 2015-05-03

Zoran R. Tulum is a fencer and fencing coach.

He began fencing at age 9. At age 19, he won the junior national championships in Yugoslavia in épée, foil, and sabre. He received a degree in architecture from the University of Belgrade. He worked as a product designer on weekdays and coached fencing at night and on weekends.

He was assistant fencing coach at Harvard University from 1985 to 1987 and coach at Stanford University 1987–1998. He is now head fencing coach of his own studio, Zeta Fencing in Ashland, Massachusetts and a saber coach for the U.S. Olympic Team.

He coached Nick Bravin who competed in the 1992 and 1996 Olympics. In 2013, three of his students were selected for the 18-member US National Junior Fencing Team. One of them, Eli Dershwitz, became the youngest-ever national champion in sabre, and went on to win gold medals in the Junior World Championship (2015) and twice in the Pan American Championships (2014 and 2015). In 2014, USA Fencing appointed him head coach of the U.S. Men's Saber Team. Zeta Fencing, was ranked number one of the USFA Clubs at Cadet & Junior World Championships, Tashkent, Uzbekistan, in 2015 with members of the club contributing 192.25 points to the US score.
