= Henry Kolowrat Jr. =

American fencer (1933–2021)

Henry Kolowrat
Personal information
- Born: August 25, 1933 Prague, Czechoslovakia
- Died: March 16, 2021 (aged 87) Czech Republic

Sport
- Sport: Fencing

Henry Kolowrat (Czech: Jindřich Kolowrat; August 25, 1933 – March 16, 2021) was an American fencer. He was born in Prague into the noble Kolowrat family. He moved with his parents to the United States in 1948 after the communist coup d'état in Czechoslovakia. He became a U.S. citizen in 1956. He competed in the team épée event at the 1960 Summer Olympics.

== See also ==
- List of NCAA fencing champions
