= Tamir Bloom =

American epee fencer (born 1971)

Personal information
- Born: December 23, 1971 (age 54) New York, New York, United States

Sport
- Sport: Fencing
- College team: University of Pennsylvania Quakers
Medal record
Men's fencing
Representing United States
Pan American Games
Silver medal – second place	1995 Mar Del Plata	Individual epee
Silver medal – second place	1995 Mar Del Plata	Team epee

Tamir Bloom (born December 24, 1971) is an American epee fencer.

== Personal life ==
Bloom was born in New York City, and is Jewish. He is a cousin of Israeli Olympian judoka Gil Ofer. Bloom has both U.S. and Israeli citizenship. He attended Millburn High School. Bloom's father is artist Murray Bloom.

== Fencing career ==
Bloom fenced for the University of Pennsylvania Quakers fencing team.

=== Olympics ===
At the 1996 Atlanta Olympic Games, Bloom placed 31st in individual epee. He was a member of the U.S. épée team that finished 8th. They were eliminated in the quarterfinals by Italy, 45–44.

He tore the anterior cruciate ligament in his right knee in 1999, a few weeks before the World Fencing Championships in Seoul. He flew to Seoul with the intention of competing and possibly qualifying for the 2000 Olympics, but once there he was not allowed to compete because of his injury by the United States Fencing Association (USFA) Team manager. As it was too late to arrange for an alternate, team coach Michael Marx took his spot. The team finished 15th, which was not good enough to qualify for the team épée event at the 2000 Summer Olympics. Following the World Championships, the USFA attempted to prevent him from qualifying for the 2000 Olympics by threatening to withhold athlete funding which he had previously been granted. Despite this, Bloom went on to earn enough World Cup qualification to become the nation's number one ranked epee fencer. He then went on to win the Olympic Zonal Qualifier in Buenos Aires on an individual basis with an ACL-deficient knee, and thus was the only American entered in the men's épée at the Sydney Olympics.

At the 2000 Sydney Olympic Games, Bloom lost in the 2nd round of individual épée to Arnd Schmitt from Germany, the top-ranked épée fencer in the world, and prior Olympic champion. Bloom finished 29th.

=== Pan American Games ===
Bloom won silver medals in both individual and team foil at the 1995 Pan American Games.

=== US Championships ===
While studying full-time at Mount Sinai School of Medicine, Bloom continued to pursue the sport, and won the individual épée U.S. national championship in 1998 and 1999. Bloom was also a Junior Olympic champion in 1989.

=== World Championships ===
Bloom has competed at four World Fencing Championships. He finished 31st in 1994, his best individual placing. In the team épée event, they placed 17th that year and 20th in 1997.

== Hall of Fame ==
Bloom was inducted into the National Jewish Sports Hall of Fame in 2001.

== See also ==
- List of select Jewish fencers
- List of USFA Division I National Champions
