= Julia Jones-Pugliese =

American fencer

Personal information
- Born: May 9, 1909 New York City
- Died: March 6, 1993 (aged 83) New York City
- Home town: New York City

Fencing career
- Sport: Fencing
- Country: United States
- Weapon: Foil

Julia Jones-Pugliese (May 9, 1909 – March 6, 1993) was an American national champion foil and épée fencer and fencing coach.

== Early and personal life ==
She was born Julia Jones, in New York, New York, and was Jewish. She graduated New York University with a BS in education in 1930.

Jones married Anthony Pugliese, a sculptor and painter who designed the NIWFA competition medal awards (depicting a silhouette of her lunging), which are presented in her name and which serve as the NIWFA logo, and who also designed the logo for Brooklyn College; he died in 1953. After her marriage, she moved to Alabama during World War II, returning to New York in 1945. She had a daughter, Penelope Shaw, an instructor in modern dance and yoga at Hunter College; and two sons, Patri, who taught physics at Harvard University, and Paul, a cartographer for Time magazine.

== Fencing career ==
Jones started fencing in 1927 as a New York University student, after deciding that she was too short to play basketball.

In 1928 in foil she won the first women's US National Intercollegiate championship, the IWFA Individual Championship, and was a member of the first IWFA Team Championship with the NYU fencing team. In 1931, Jones was the US national junior women's foil champion.

She qualified for and was a member of the US Olympic Women's Foil Fencing Team for the 1932 Summer Olympics in Los Angeles, but did not compete. Jones was deemed ineligible to compete in the Olympics because she had accepted an offer to be a fencing coach at NYU, and therefore was considered a professional athlete for being paid to teach others about fencing.

In 1990 at the age of 82 Jones-Pugliese won a silver medal for finishing second in the round-robin tournament of senior women ages 40 or older competing in senior épée in the United States Fencing Association national championship. She was still competing in 1992 at age 84, a year before she died.

== National Intercollegiate Women's Fencing Association ==
In 1928 Jones co-founded, with Dorothy Hafner and Elizabeth Ross, the (United States) Intercollegiate Women's Fencing Association—later known as the National Intercollegiate Women's Fencing Association (the IWFA, and later, NIWFA). The association, whose membership grew from 4 to 79 colleges, conducts America's oldest continuous intercollegiate championship competition for women in any sport. The annual NIWFA Foil Champion is awarded the Julia Jones Trophy, and the finalists in each weapon are awarded Julia Jones Medals.

== Coaching career ==
Jones-Pugliese had a 60-year career as a fencing coach.

From 1932 to 1938 she was coach of the NYU women's fencing team—the first woman to coach a collegiate fencing team. The team won IWFA national championships in 1932, 1933, and 1938.

Jones-Pugliese retired for close to two decades to raise a family. She returned to coaching in 1956.

She was the fencing team's coach from 1956 until her death in 1993 at Hunter College, part of the City University of New York system. Jones-Pugliese coached the Hunter team to a NIWFA national championship in 1970, and was named NIFWA Coach of the Year. She was also an assistant professor in Hunter College's Department of Health and Physical Education. In 1992, she was again awarded Coach of the Year honors.

At the 1970 World University Games in Turin, Italy, Jones-Pugliese was the first woman appointed to coach an international US fencing team. She also became the first woman coach of a US Olympic fencing team. She was named assistant coach to both the men's and women's US fencing teams in 1977, and head coach in 1981.

Jones-Pugliese was United States women's and men's fencing coach at the 1977 and 1981 Maccabiah Games.

She died of a heart attack in Manhattan in 1993 at age 84.

== Hall of Fame and Awards ==
- 1976: NYU Athletics Hall of Fame
- 1992: NIFWA Coach of the Year.
- 2002: International Jewish Sports Hall of Fame "Pillar of Achievement"
- United States Fencing Association Hall of Honor
- Helms Athletic Foundation Hall of Fame
- New York Sports Hall of Fame
- Hunter College Hall of Fame
- The Team Medals and Individual Foil Champion trophy for the NIWFA are named after Julia Jones (under her maiden name), and fashioned in her likeness.

== See also ==
- List of USFA Hall of Fame members
