= Patri J. Pugliese =

Patri Pugliese
- in Zouave uniform as a Civil War reenactor, Memorial Day, May 29, 2006
- Born: May 11, 1950
- Died: February 11, 2007 (aged 56); Medford, Massachusetts, U.S.
- Other name: Patri du Chat Gris (SCA)
- Education: Harvard University
- Occupation: Historian
- Employer: Dragon Systems
- Organization(s): Commonwealth Vintage Dancers; Higgins Sword Guild at the Higgins Armory Museum; Society for Creative Anachronism (SCA)
- Title: Baron of Carolingia (SCA)
- Term: 1979–1996
- Predecessor: John of Ileway
- Successor: Aquel of Darksted Wood
- Spouse: Barbara
- Children: 2
- Parent(s): Julia Jones-Pugliese (mother), Anthony Pugliese (father)

Patri J. Pugliese (May 11, 1950 – February 11, 2007) was a historian of science, dance, and fencing, as well as a teacher of historical dance.

He received his Ph.D. in the history of science from Harvard University in 1982, but was best known for his work as a dance historian specializing in the 19th century and for his dissemination of facsimiles of once exceedingly rare historical works on fencing.

His mother, Julia Jones-Pugliese, was the first U.S. women's intercollegiate fencing champion in 1929, and worked as a professional fencing coach until 1993. In many ways, he himself can be regarded as the father of the modern study of the history of European swordsmanship; it was through the texts he provided that many scholars were first introduced to the importance of martial expression to early modern culture.

Pugliese was known not only for the study and dissemination of historical dance and fencing treatises, but also for his teaching and charitable work. He was a founding member of the Commonwealth Vintage Dancers in Boston and the Higgins Sword Guild at the Higgins Armory Museum in Worcester, Massachusetts. He was also active as a Civil War reenactor and in the Society for Creative Anachronism, serving as Baron of Carolingia from 1978 to 1995. He worked professionally at Dragon Systems.

Pugliese died on February 11, 2007, after a year-long battle with cancer.
