= Tyrone Simmons =

American fencer

Personal information
- Full name: Tyrone Morse Simmons
- Born: July 5, 1949 (age 77) Philadelphia, Pennsylvania, U.S.

Sport
- Sport: Fencing
- College team: University of Detroit

Tyrone Morse Simmons (born July 5, 1949) is an American fencer. He competed in the team foil event at the 1972 Summer Olympics. He was born in Philadelphia, Pennsylvania.

== See also ==
- List of NCAA fencing champions
