= National Intercollegiate Women's Fencing Association =

Fencing organisation in the United States of America

- Conference: NCAA
- Founded: 1929; 97 years ago
- Sports fielded: 1
- Division: Interdivisional
- No. of teams: 20
- Region: Northeast (15 schools); South (5 schools)
- Official website: www.niwfa.com

Locations

The National Intercollegiate Women's Fencing Association (NIWFA) is a women's collegiate fencing organization in the United States. The organization was founded as the IWFA in 1929 by two New York University students, Julia Jones and Dorothy Hafner, and Betsy Ross, a student at Cornell University who based the organization on the male Intercollegiate Fencing Association.

== History ==
The IWFA became the "National Intercollegiate Women's Fencing Association" in 1964 and called for a national championship, which it conducted annually among its membership. From 1980 through 1982, a national championship was also administered by the Association for Intercollegiate Athletics for Women. NIWFA title competition was held in addition to the AIAW championships and the NCAA women's championships from 1982 to 1989. In 1990, the NCAA combined its men's and women's team championships. Starting in 2026, the NCAA again conducts a separate women’s fencing championship.

== Current programs ==
- Bryn Mawr College
- City College of New York
- Drew University
- Fairleigh Dickinson University
- University of Florida
- Haverford College
- Hunter College
- Lafayette College
- University of Maryland
- Mount Holyoke College
- Queens College, City University of New York
- Rutgers University
- Smith College
- Stevens Institute of Technology
- Swarthmore College
- Temple University
- University of Virginia
- College of William & Mary
- Yeshiva University
- United States Military Academy
- United States Naval Academy

== NIWFA Team Champions ==
=== Foil team (1929–1995), overall team (1996–present) ===
The winner of the foil team title received the Mildred Stuyvesant-Fish Trophy. Épée team competition began in 1995, followed by sabre team competition in 2000. Overall titles have been awarded since 1996.

- 1929 New York University
- 1930 New York University
- 1931 New York University
- 1932 New York University
- 1933 New York University
- 1934 Brooklyn College
- 1935 Hunter College
- 1936 Hunter College
- 1937 Hunter College
- 1938 New York University
- 1939 Hofstra University
- 1940 Hunter College
- 1941 Brooklyn College
- 1942 Jersey City State College
- 1943 Jersey City State College
- 1944 Hunter College
- 1945 Brooklyn College
- 1946 Hunter College
- 1947 Hunter College
- 1948 Hunter College
- 1949 New York University
- 1950 New York University
- 1951 New York University
- 1952 Hunter College
- 1953 Hunter College
- 1954 Elmira College
- 1955 Rochester Institute of Technology
- 1956 Paterson State College
- 1957 Rochester Institute of Technology
- 1958 Paterson State College
- 1959 Paterson State College
- 1960 Fairleigh Dickinson University
- 1961 Paterson State College
- 1962 Paterson State College
- 1963 Fairleigh Dickinson University
- 1964 Paterson State College
- 1965 Paterson State College
- 1966 Paterson State College
- 1967 Cornell University
- 1968 Cornell University
- 1969 Cornell University
- 1970 Hunter College
- 1971 New York University
- 1972 Cornell University
- 1973 Cornell University
- 1974 California State-Fullerton
- 1975 San Jose State University
- 1976 San Jose State University
- 1977 San Jose State University
- 1978 San Jose State University
- 1979 San Jose State University
- 1980 Pennsylvania State University
- 1981 St. John's University
- 1982 Yale University
- 1983 Yale University
- 1984 St. John's University
- 1985 St. John's University
- 1986 Temple University
- 1987 Temple University
- 1988 Temple University
- 1989 Temple University
- 1990 Paterson State College
- 1991 Temple University
- 1992 Cornell University
- 1993 Cornell University
- 1994 Princeton University
- 1995 Princeton University (also won épée title)
- 1996 Temple University
- 1997 Temple University
- 1998 Temple University
- 1999 Temple University
- 2000 Temple University
- 2001 Temple University
- 2002 Temple University
- 2003 Temple University
- 2004 Temple University
- 2005 Temple University
- 2006 Temple University
- 2007 Temple University
- 2008 Temple University
- 2009 Temple University
- 2010 Temple University
- 2011 Temple University
- 2012 Temple University
- 2013 Temple University
- 2014 Temple University
- 2015 Temple University
- 2016 Temple University
- 2017 Temple University
- 2018 Temple University
- 2019 Temple University
- 2020 Temple University
- 2021 cancelled (pandemic)
- 2022 Temple University
- 2023 Temple University
- 2024 Temple University
- 2025 Temple University

== See also ==
- United States Association of Collegiate Fencing Clubs (USACFC)
- Intercollegiate Fencing Association
- Intercollegiate sports team champions
