= Collegiate fencing =

Fencing in US colleges

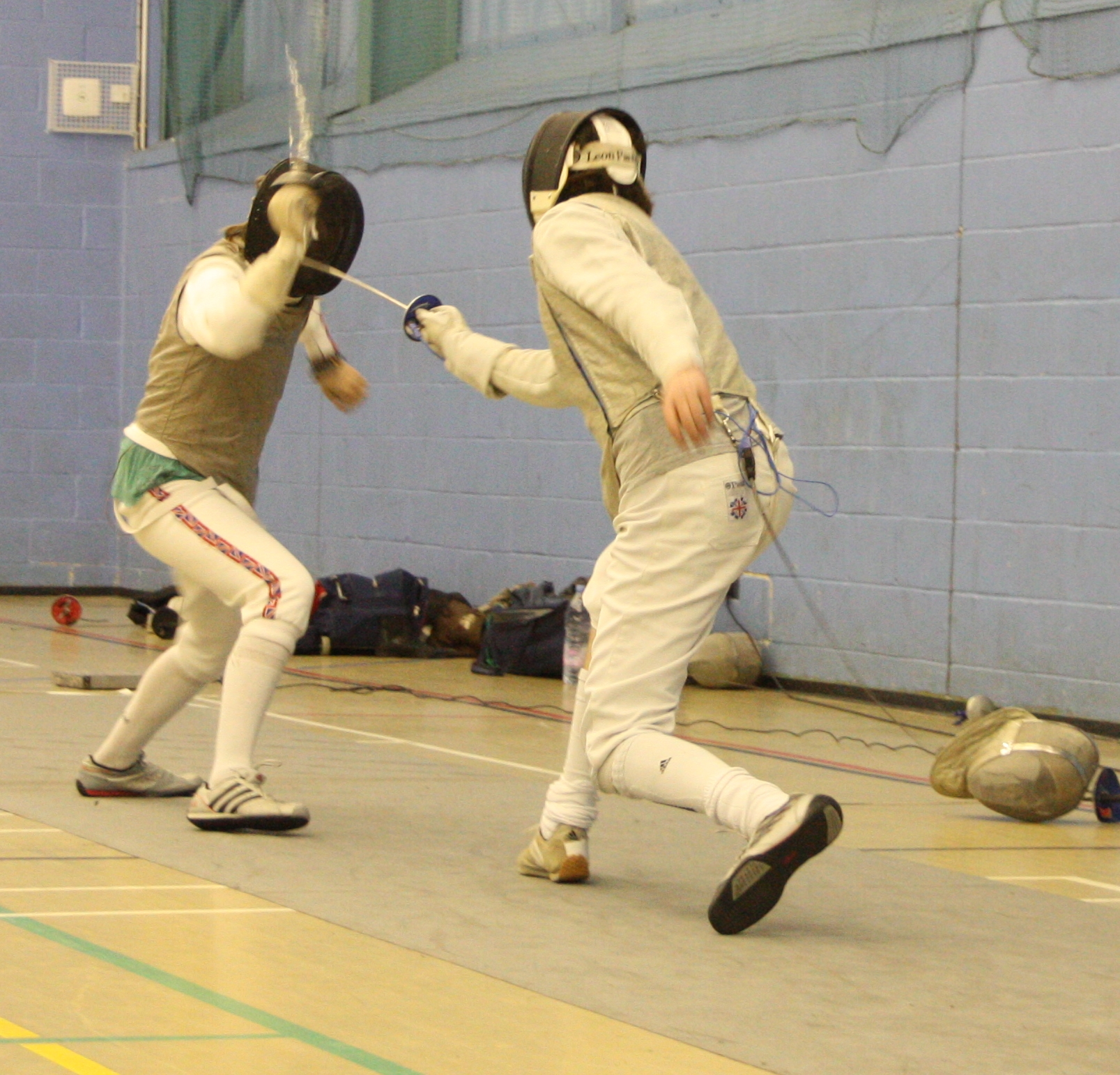
A fencing match at the University of Kent

Collegiate fencing in the United States can be traced back to as early as 1941. Some of the earliest programs in the US came from the Ivy League schools, with the first Ivy League fencing championships taking place in 1956. As of 2023, there are 112 club teams, 43 women's varsity fencing programs and 33 men's varsity teams in the US. Both clubs and varsity teams participate in the sport, however only the varsity teams may participate in the NCAA championship tournament. Due to the limited number of colleges that have fencing teams, NCAA fencing combines the three divisions into a combined National Collegiate sport, all participating in one NCAA Championship.

== Tournament format ==
=== Regular season tournaments ===
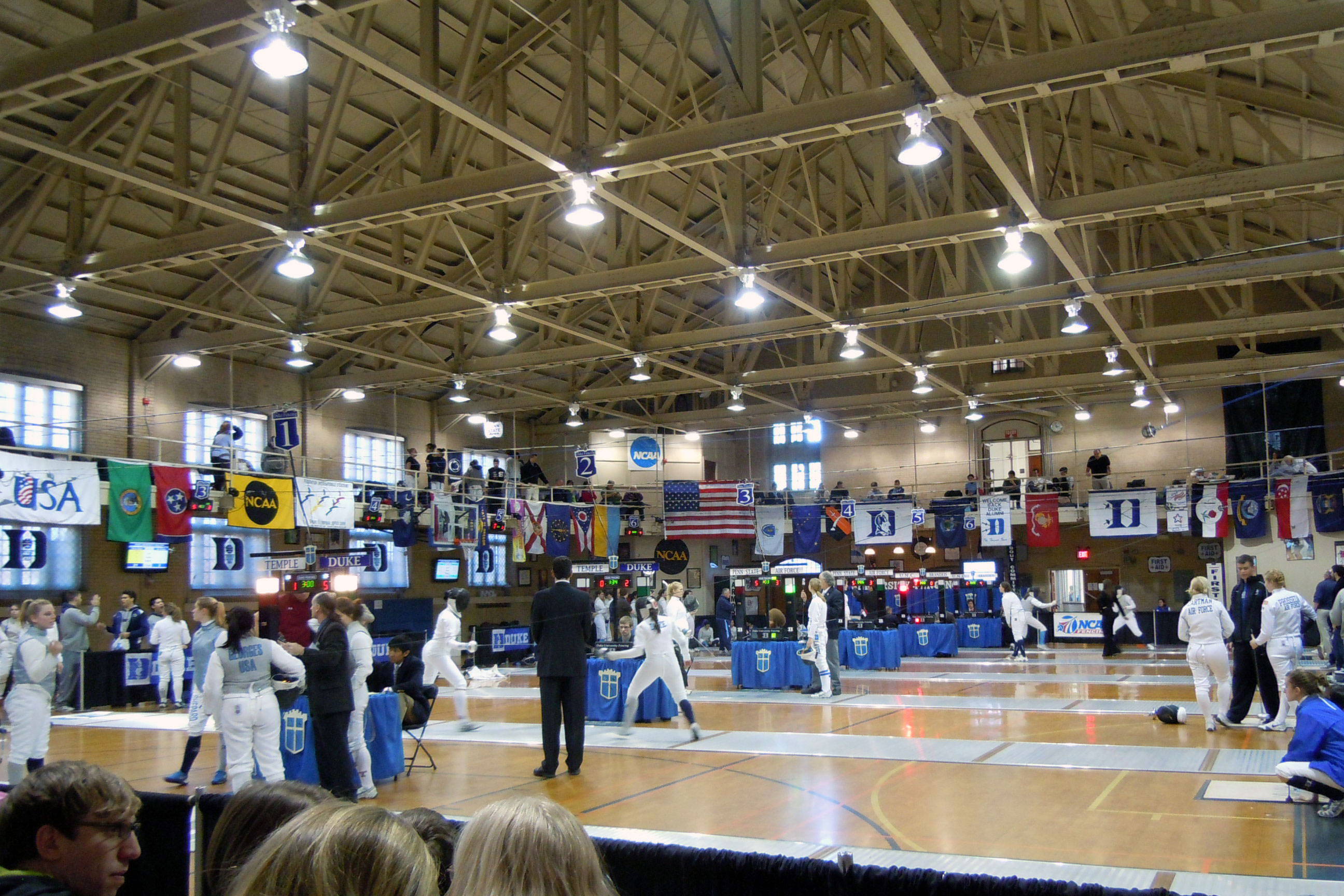
Fencing meet hosted by Division I school Duke University.

Collegiate fencing tournaments are "team tournaments", but unlike team matches in national and international level competitions, collegiate meets are not run as 45-touch relays. Schools compete against each other one at a time. In each weapon and gender, three fencers from each school fence three fencers on the opposing team in five-touch bouts. Substitutions are allowed, so more than three fencers per squad can compete in a tournament. A total of nine bouts are fenced, and the school with the most bouts won, wins the match. A fencer's individual results in collegiate tournaments and regional championships are used to select the fencers who will compete in NCAA championships. To qualify for the NCAA Regional competition, a fencer needs to meet the minimum win percentage and bout participation rate set by the NCAA.

=== Postseason tournaments ===
==== Club fencing ====
Collegiate fencing clubs participate in a championship hosted by the United States Association of Collegiate Fencing Clubs in the spring.

==== NCAA fencing ====
Fencers that qualify for the Regionals compete in one of four regions: Northeast, Mid-Atlantic/South, Midwest, and West. Unlike regular season tournaments, fencers compete as individuals. Athletes qualify for the NCAA Fencing Championship based on their finishing position in the regionals along with their regular season performance. All regional competition are conducted using a pool format that includes a minimum one round of pools. The minimum number of finalists must be at least equal to the number of regional allocations plus two. Each region has a varying number of qualifiers allocated by the NCAA. Up to 12 fencers per school can participate in the event.

In the Championship, fencers compete in a round-robin of 24 fencers in five-touch bouts. The top four fencers in each event fence direct elimination, 15-touch semifinals and championship bouts. No more than 2 fencers from each weapon per gender can be selected from one institution. A pre-championship manual is provided to the coaches of all NCAA fencing team that includes information on rules, formats and important dates. An institution’s final place in the final round of the championships will be based on points earned by each individual. Each team is awarded one point for each individual’s five-touch bout victory fencing in the round robin of 24 and results from the top four finals bouts do not count toward team standings.

Many college teams are also members of athletic conferences and compete in conference championships. The Ivy League, Atlantic Coast Conference and the Mountain Pacific Sports Federation are the only major conferences to sponsor fencing. Other conferences include the Central Collegiate Fencing Conference, the New England Intercollegiate Fencing Conference and the women's team only Eastern Women's Fencing Conference. Teams can be members of multiple conferences and hence compete in more than one conference championship.

== Scholarships ==
According to official NCAA regulations, colleges are limited to granting five full ("free ride") fencing scholarships per year for women and 4.5 for men.

== See also ==
- List of NCAA fencing schools
- NCAA Fencing Championships
- Intercollegiate Fencing Association (IFA)
- National Intercollegiate Women's Fencing Association (NIWFA)
- United States Association of Collegiate Fencing Clubs (USACFC) (including national championships)
- U.S. Fencing Coaches Association
- College athletics
- High school fencing
