= Paul Makler Jr. =

American fencer

Personal information
- Full name: Paul Todd Makler Jr.
- Born: January 8, 1946 (age 80) Philadelphia, Pennsylvania, United States
- Height: 6 ft 0 in (183 cm)
- Weight: 165 lb (75 kg)

Sport
- Country: USA
- Sport: Fencing
- Events: Saber and epee
- College team: University of Pennsylvania Quakers
- Club: Salle Csiszar

Paul Todd Makler Jr. (born January 8, 1946) is an American Olympic saber and épée fencer.

== Early and personal life ==
He was born in Philadelphia, Pennsylvania, later lived in Merion, Pennsylvania, and is Quaker. After college, he attended and in 1972 graduated from the University of Pennsylvania Medical School. He is the son of Paul Makler Sr. who fenced for the United States at the 1952 Summer Olympics. His brother Brooke Makler fenced at the 1976 Summer Olympics.

== Fencing career ==
His fencing club is Salle Csiszar.

Makler fenced at the University of Pennsylvania (class of 1968) for the University of Pennsylvania Quakers. He was NCAA individual saber champion in both 1967 and 1968, and was a first-team All-American both years.

He competed in the team épée event at the 1972 Summer Olympics in Munich at the age of 26.

== See also ==
- List of NCAA fencing champions
