= Intercollegiate Fencing Association =

The Intercollegiate Fencing Association (IFA) was the oldest collegiate fencing conference in the United States. It was affiliated with the Eastern College Athletic Conference (ECAC).

== Membership ==
In its final season, the IFA had 11 members. Cornell only competed in women's fencing; the remaining 10 teams participated with men's and women's teams

- Brandeis Judges
- Brown Bears
- Columbia Lions
- Cornell Big Red
- Harvard Crimson
- MIT Engineers
- NYU Violets
- Penn Quakers
- Princeton Tigers
- Vassar Brewers
- Yale Bulldogs

All of the Ivy universities with Division I fencing programs were also members of the IFA. Dartmouth College does not have a varsity fencing program.

== IFA Championship Tournament ==
The 2007 IFA Championship tournament was hosted by Princeton University on Saturday March 3, 2007. Because no suitable venue at Princeton was available, the tournament was held nearby at the Lawrenceville School.

There were 9 trophies given to teams at the annual IFA Championships in the following categories:

- Men's Foil
- Men's Épée
- Men's Saber
- Women's Foil
- Women's Épée
- Women's Saber
- Men's 3-Weapon Team
- Women's 3-Weapon Team
- Men's and Women's 6-Weapon Team

In 1994 Stephen Kovacs (1972–2022), a Columbia saber fencer and later a fencing coach, became the first fencer to win four consecutive IFA championships.

Among these awards, the most prestigious was the trophy given to the Men's Foil team champion. This trophy is known as the Little Iron Man and, at the time, was the oldest trophy still awarded for any collegiate sport in the United States. It was cast in 1893 and had been awarded to the IFA Men's Foil team champion since 1896.

The 2008 IFA Championship Tournament was hosted by Columbia University on Sunday February 24, 2008.

The 2009 IFA Championship Tournament was hosted by Brandeis University on Saturday, February 28, 2009. It was the final one held.

== Little Iron Man ==
Little Iron Man

Until the end of the IFA tournament, the Little Iron Man was the oldest trophy still awarded in collegiate sports.

It was awarded each year to the team that won the Men's Foil competition at the Intercollegiate Fencing Association championships.

The trophy was cast in 1893 and was awarded to the IFA Men's Foil team champion since 1896. It currently resides at the University of Pennsylvania.

== See also ==
- Pre-NCAA Intercollegiate Fencing Association Champions
- United States Association of Collegiate Fencing Clubs (USACFC)
- National Intercollegiate Women's Fencing Association (NIWFA)
