= USACFC =

American collegiate fencing organization

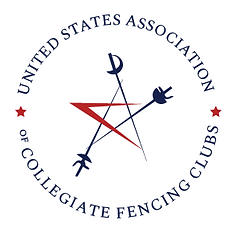
USACFC official logo selected from a design contest in 2020.

The United States Association of Collegiate Fencing Clubs (USACFC) was established in 2003 to educate and promote collegiate fencing throughout the United States. The organization has over 45 teams, about one-third of the schools with non-varsity college club fencing in the U.S.

USACFC became a nonprofit corporation in 2005.

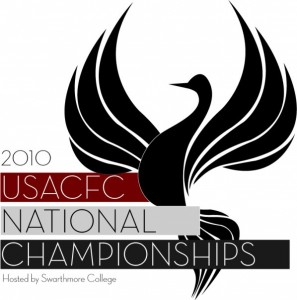
The 2010 USACFC logo by James Preimesberger, Swarthmore College Fencing Team. The logo was replaced in 2020.

== Champions ==
Year	Combined Team	Women's Team	Men's Team
2003	University of Massachusetts Amherst	University of Florida	Northwestern University
2004	University of Massachusetts Amherst	University of Massachusetts Amherst	Cornell University
2005	United States Military Academy	United States Military Academy	Northwestern University
2006	University of Michigan	University of Michigan	
2007	University of Michigan	University of Michigan	William and Mary
2008	Arizona State University	University of Florida	Arizona State University
2009	University of Florida	University of Florida	William and Mary
2010	University of Florida	University of Florida	Northwestern University
2011	University of Florida	University of Florida	Northwestern University
2012	University of Florida	University of Florida	University of Michigan
2013	University of Michigan	University of Michigan	University of Michigan
2014	Dartmouth College	United States Naval Academy	Dartmouth College
2015	University of Michigan	Dartmouth College	Northwestern University
2016	University of Michigan	Dartmouth College	University of Michigan
2017	University of Michigan	Dartmouth College	Clemson University
2018	Dartmouth College	Dartmouth College	Cornell University
2019	University of Michigan	University of Michigan	University of Texas
2022	University of Michigan	University of Michigan	Brown University & Northeastern University
2023	Northeastern University	University of Michigan	Northeastern University
2024	Northeastern University	Northeastern University	Cornell University
2025	Northeastern University	University of Southern California	Northeastern University

== Sites of USACFC National Championships ==
- 2003: University of Florida
- 2004: University of New Hampshire
- 2005: Michigan State University
- 2006: Clemson University
- 2007: Indiana University
- 2008: Smith College
- 2009: University of Wisconsin
- 2010: Swarthmore College
- 2011: University of Chicago
- 2012: Hartford, Connecticut, originally slated for United States Military Academy
- 2013: Michigan State University
- 2014: University of Tennessee
- 2015: Bensalem, Pennsylvania, hosted by Swarthmore College
- 2016: Brown University
- 2017: East Lansing, Michigan, hosted by Michigan State University
- 2018: Knoxville, Tennessee, hosted by University of Tennessee Knoxville
- 2019: Bucks County, Pennsylvania
- 2020: Cancelled due to COVID-19, originally slated for West Springfield, Massachusetts
- 2021: Cancelled due to COVID-19, originally slated for West Springfield, Massachusetts
- 2022: Providence, Rhode Island
- 2023: Fort Wayne, Indiana
- 2024: Virginia Beach, VA, with volunteers from William & Mary Fencing Club
- 2025: State College, PA, hosted by Bryn Mawr College Fencing Club and Drexel University Fencing Club
- 2026: State College, PA, with volunteers Bryn Mawr College Fencing Club and Drexel University Fencing Club
- 2027: slated for Hagerstown, MD

== See also ==
- National Intercollegiate Women's Fencing Association (NIWFA)
- Intercollegiate Fencing Association (IFA)
