= Paul Makler Sr. =

American fencer (1920–2022)

Paul Makler, Sr.
Personal information
- Full name: Paul Todd Makler, Sr.
- Born: October 22, 1920 Philadelphia, Pennsylvania, U.S.
- Died: May 12, 2022 (aged 101) Los Altos, California, U.S.

Sport
- Sport: Fencing
- Events: épée and foil
- College team: University of Pennsylvania Quakers
- Club: Salle Csiszar

Paul Todd Makler Sr. (October 22, 1920 – May 12, 2022) was an American Olympic foil and épée fencer.

== Early and personal life ==
Makler was born in Philadelphia, Pennsylvania, and was Jewish. He attended the University of Pennsylvania, fencing for the University of Pennsylvania Quakers, and University of Pennsylvania Medical School, graduating in 1964, became a physician, and practiced internal medicine for many years. His sons Paul Makler Jr. and Brooke Makler fenced at the 1972 Summer Olympics and the 1976 Summer Olympics, respectively.

Makler died in Los Altos, California on May 12, 2022, at the age of 101.

== Fencing career ==
Makler competed in the individual and team épée events at the 1952 Summer Olympics in Helsinki. He won a silver medal in the team foil event at the 1955 Pan American Games. Makler competed for Salle Csiszar, winning an Amateur Fencers League of America (AFLA) national team épée title with the club in 1956. Makler was President of the American Fencing Association in 1962.
