= Cliff Bayer =

American fencer (born 1977)

Personal information
- Born: June 24, 1977 (age 49) New York, New York, United States
- Height: 6 ft 0.5 in (184.2 cm)
- Weight: 174 lb (79 kg)

Sport
- Sport: Fencing
- Event: Foil
- College team: University of Pennsylvania Quakers
Medal record
Men's fencing
Representing United States
Pan American Games
Silver medal – second place	1999 Winnipeg	Team Foil

Cliff Bayer (born June 24, 1977, in New York City) is an American two-time Olympian foil fencer.

== Early and personal life ==
Bayer was born in New York City, and is Jewish.

== College ==
In 1996, he was the NCAA Foil Champion while at the University of Pennsylvania, where he attended the Wharton School of Business, fencing for the University of Pennsylvania Quakers fencing team. He also earned an MBA from Wharton.

=== US championships ===
Bayer won the 1995 U.S. National Championship while still a senior at Riverdale Country School in the Bronx. He was, at age 17, the youngest person to win the national championship—an honor that he held until 2007, when Gerek Meinhardt won the championship at the age of 16. He also won the U.S. National Championship in 1997, 1998, and 2000.

=== Olympics ===
At the 1996 Summer Olympics, Bayer placed 34th in the individual foil competition, and was a member of the U.S. foil team that finished 10th.

Bayer was ranked No. 8 in the world in foil at the start of the 2000 Summer Olympics. He was eliminated from the competition in the third round, placing 10th. Bayer was named male Fencing Athlete of the Year by the 2000 U.S. Olympic Committee.

=== World Cup ===
Bayer was the first American to win a medal at a senior men's World Cup event, taking the bronze in Espinho, Portugal in May 1999. He was also the first American to win a World Cup title, winning the World Championship Cup St. Petersburg, Russia that same year. At that competition, he routed 3-time world champion Sergei Golubitsky of Ukraine 15–6 in the quarterfinals before defeating 1995 world champion Dmitriy Shevchenko of Russia 10–5 in the final. Bayer won a second World Cup title in April 2000 in Bonn, Germany, where he defeated defending Olympic champion Puccini of Italy.

=== World Championships ===
Bayer's best showing at the World Fencing Championships was in 1999, when he placed 12th in the individual foil event.

=== Pan American Games ===
Bayer won a team silver medal at the 1999 Pan American Games in Canada.

== Hall of Fame and awards ==
In 1996, Bayer was named U.S. Fencer of the Year. He was named first team All-American in 1997 and 1998, and All-Ivy in 1998.

Bayer was honored in 1999 as the United States Olympic Committee's Male Athlete of the Month for May, beating out canoe sprinter Nate Johnson, boxer Demetrius Hopkins, and cycler Christian Vande Velde.

He was inducted into the National Jewish Sports Hall of Fame in 2001. He was also inducted into the Philadelphia Jewish Sports Hall of Fame.

Bayer was inducted into the USA Fencing Hall of Fame in 2013 and into the University of Pennsylvania Hall of Fame in 2014.

== See also ==
- List of select Jewish fencers
- List of NCAA fencing champions
- List of USFA Division I National Champions
- List of USFA Hall of Fame members
