= University of Belgrade Faculty of Architecture =

University faculty in Belgrade, Serbia

- Архитектонски факултет Универзитета у Београду
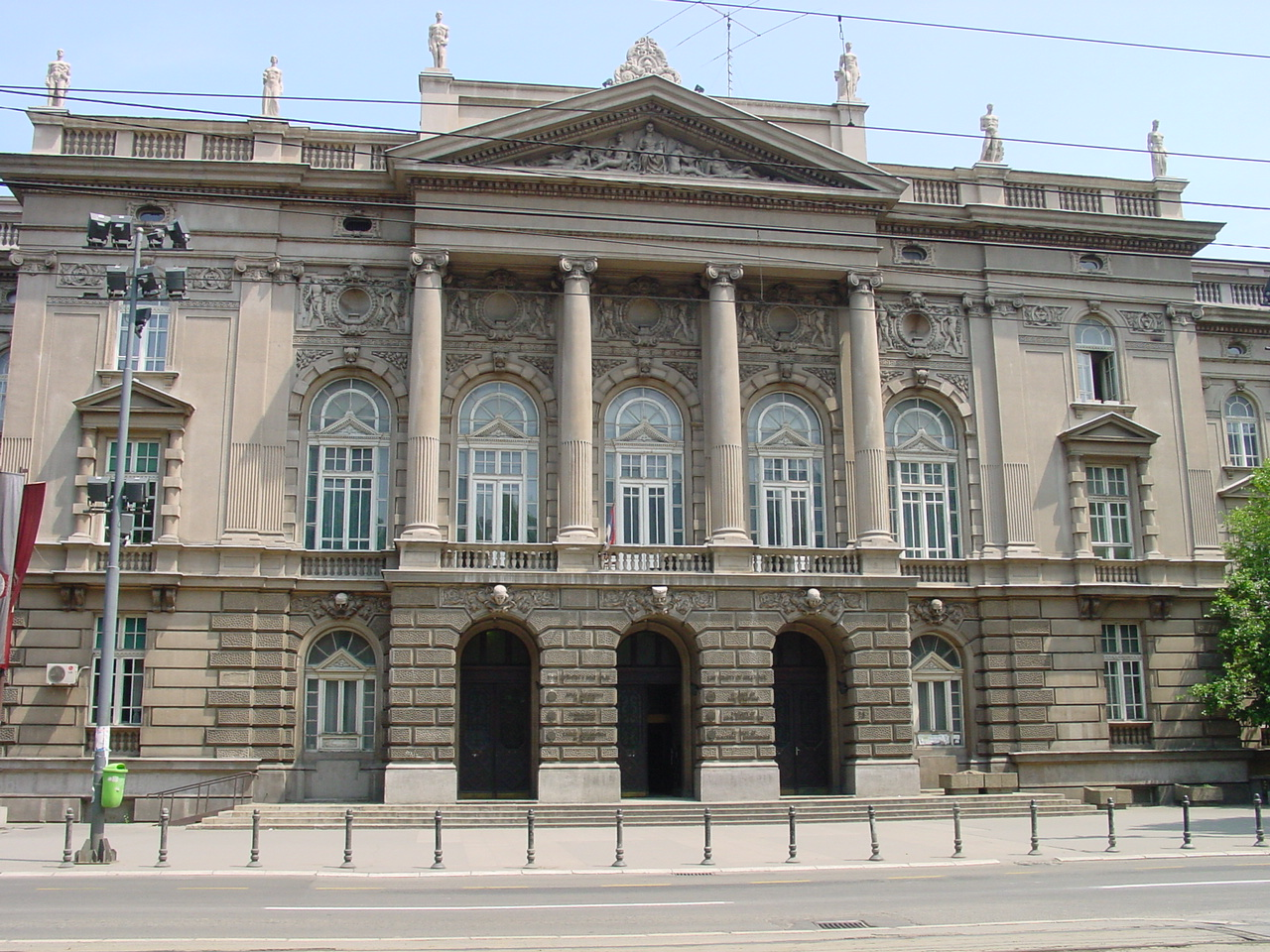
- Type: Public
- Established: 1948
- Dean: Vladimir Lojanica
- Academic staff: 131 (2016)
- Administrative staff: 52 (2016)
- Students: 1,688 (2016)
- Undergraduates: 990 (2016)
- Postgraduates: 522 (2016)
- Doctoral students: 176 (2016)
- Location: Belgrade, Serbia; 44.805741°N 20.476247°E
- Campus: Urban
- Website: www.arh.bg.ac.rs

The Faculty of Architecture (Serbian: Архитектонски факултет Универзитета у Београду/Arhitektonski fakultet Univerziteta u Beogradu) is one of the 31 schools of the University of Belgrade. It shares the building with Faculties of Civil Engineering and Electrical Engineering. The Faculty of Architecture is made up of three Departments: Architecture, Urban Planning and Architectural Technologies.

The Faculty of Architecture publishes the triannual Serbian Architectural Journal.

Since the Faculty's foundation in 1948, a total of 8,120 students have completed the five-year program and graduated as Bachelors of Engineering in Architecture (Serbian: Дипломирани инжењер архитектуре, Д.И.А., romanized: Diplomirani inženjer arhitekture, D.I.A.). In addition, 362 Masters and 139 Doctoral theses have been defended.

== Notable alumni ==
- Ivan Antić
- Bogdan Bogdanović
- Ana Đurić
- Sanja Ilić
- Branislav Milenkovic
- Ranko Radović
- Zoran Tulum
- Vladan Đokić
- Vladimir Veličković
