= George DeBenedicty =

Hungarian-American equine businessman

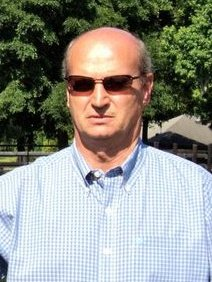
- George DeBenedicty in 2011
- Born: George Szunyogh DeBenedicty; June 12, 1949 (age 77); Budapest, Hungary
- Education: New York University
- Occupations: Broker, entrepreneur, horse breeder
- Spouse: Karin Bell DeBenedicty
- Children: Victoria DeBenedicty (born 1995); Adrian W. Bell III (born 1987); Evelyn M. Bell (born 1987)
- Website: Ocala Ranches

George DeBenedicty (born June 12, 1949) founded Pegasus Realty & Associates, Inc. in Ocala, Florida, in 1982. Since then he has sold over $1.2 Billion of farms, training centers and acreages; becoming the leader in equine property sales. DeBenedicty owns and operates American Eagle Farm in Ocala, races his thoroughbred race horses on both the East and West coast, is very involved in horse breeding and is also involved in the hunter/jumper show circuit.

== Early life ==
DeBenedicty was born and raised in Budapest, Hungary. At age 16 he won the Hungarian modern pentathlon championships. When he turned 17 he began competing all across Europe; in France, Austria, Germany and Poland, representing the Hungarian national team. He immigrated to New York City at the age of 18. At age 19, he joined The New York Athletic Club fencing team. In 1969, he competed and made the final in Martini & Rossi International Cup in NYC. During this time he had been accepted to New York University under a full fencing scholarship. In the 1971 NCAA Fencing Championships, he won both the individual épée and the team titles with NYU.

== Career ==
DeBenedicty began his real estate career in 1976 joining Weichert Realtors as a real estate agent in Morristown, New Jersey. In 1978 DeBenedicty became office manager of Weichert Realtors in their office in Middletown.

DeBenedicty moved to Ocala, Florida, in 1981. Shortly after arriving there, DeBenedicty started his own real estate company called Pegasus Realty & Associates, Inc., in 1982. He started getting further involved in the thoroughbred horse industry in 1985 when he first started breeding horses. He had many victories on the race track throughout the years. His greatest was winning the Crown Royal Stakes at Churchill Downs with his horse Broadway Beau, in 1996.

== Personal life ==
DeBenedicty has been married to Karin Bell since 1990. They had a daughter named Victoria in October 1995.

== See also ==
- List of NCAA fencing champions
