= Catherine Walsh =

Catherine Walsh or Katherine Walsh may refer to:

- Catherine Walsh (poet) (born 1964), Irish poet
- Catherine Walsh (athlete) (born 1973), Irish Paralympian athlete
- Catherine Walsh (actress), (born 1970), Irish actress
- Katherine Walsh (politician) (elected 1988), former member of the Ohio House of Representatives
- Katherine Walsh (actress) (1947–1970), American actress
- Catherine Walsh (javelin thrower), winner of the basketball throw at the 1954 USA Indoor Track and Field Championships

== See also ==
- Kathy Walsh (disambiguation)
- Kate Walsh (disambiguation)
