= Candy Stripes =

American Thoroughbred racehorse

- Sire: Blushing Groom
- Grandsire: Red God
- Dam: Bubble Company
- Damsire: Lyphard
- Sex: Stallion
- Foaled: 1982
- Country: United States
- Colour: Chestnut
- Breeder: E. Allen Cowen II
- Owner: Mahmoud Fustok
- Trainer: Georges Mikhalidès
- Record: 6: 2-1-0
- Earnings: US$41,738 (equivalent)

Candy Stripes (April 12, 1982 – February 28, 2007) was an American thoroughbred race horse and sire. A descendant of the great Nearco through his sire, Blushing Groom, he was out of the mare Bubble Company, a granddaughter of the 20th Century's greatest sire of sires, Northern Dancer.

Candy Stripes is best known as the sire of 2007 American Horse of the Year, Invasor, and the 2005 American Champion Male Turf Horse, Leroidesanimaux. Candy Stripes was also the broodmare sire of the unbeaten, Candy Ride.

Bred in Kentucky by Allen Cowen, Candy Stripes raced in France, winning two of six races and running second in the Poule d'Essai des Poulains (Fr-I). He was returned to North America in 1986, then was sent to Argentina two years later to stand at stud. Following a good deal of success south of the equator, he was imported to the U.S. in 1997 to stand at the Taylor family's Taylor Made Farm near Nicholasville, Kentucky. He shuttled to Argentina during that time and later ended up back in that South American country. During his stallion career, Candy Stripes sired ten champions in the United States, Canada, Argentina, and South Africa. He sired 465 winners, 59 stakes race winners, and 43 group/graded winners.

Candy Stripes died from colic just over a month from his 25th birthday at Haras Carampangue in San Antonio de Areco, Buenos Aires Province, Argentina.
