= Notre Dame Fighting Irish fencing =

Fencing team for the University of Notre Dame

- First season: 1934; 92 years ago
- Athletic director: Pete Bevacqua
- Head coach: Gia Kvaratskhelia; 11th season, 780–89 (.898)
- Home stadium: Edmund P. Joyce Center
- Location: South Bend, Indiana
- League: NCAA Division I
- Conference: Atlantic Coast Conference
- Past conferences: Great Lakes Conference, Midwest Intercollegiate Conference, Midwest Fencing Conference
- All-time record: 2,968–339 (.897)
- National Titles: 16
- Conference titles: 43
- All-Americans: 195
- Colors: Blue and gold
- Fight song: Notre Dame Victory March
- Mascot: Notre Dame Leprechaun
- Website: FightingIrish.com

The Notre Dame Fighting Irish fencing team represents the University of Notre Dame in collegiate fencing. The Irish compete in the Atlantic Coast Conference of NCAA Division I.

== National championships ==
=== Team ===
- Men: 1977, 1978, 1986, 2026
- Women: 1987, 2026
- Combined (Note: NCAA Championships were co-ed between 1990 and 2025.): 1994, 2003, 2005, 2011, 2017, 2018, 2021, 2022, 2023, 2025

=== Individual ===
Women's Foil

- Molly Sullivan (1986, 1988)
- Heidi Piper (1991)
- Alicja Kryczalo (2002, 2003, 2004)
- Lee Kiefer (2013, 2014, 2015, 2017)
- Stefani Deschner (2021)

Women's Épée

- Magda Krol (1997)
- Kerry Walton (2002)
- Kelley Hurley (2008)
- Courtney Hurley (2011, 2013)
- Eszter Muhari (2023, 2025, 2026)

Women's Saber

- Valerie Providenza (2004)
- Mariel Zagunis (2006)
- Sarah Borrmann (2008)
- Francesca Russo (2015, 2017)
- Kara Linder (2021)
- Magda Skarbonkiewicz (2025)

Men's Foil

- Pat Gerard (1977)
- Andrew Bonk (1979)
- Charles Higgs-Coulthard (1984)
- Gerek Meinhardt (2010, 2014)
- Ariel DeSmet (2011)
- Nick Itkin (2018, 2019)
- Marcello Olivares (2021)
- Chase Emmer (2025)

Men's Épée

- Björne Väggö (1978)
- Ola Harstrom (1983)
- Jubba Beshin (1990)
- Michal Sobieraj (2005)

Men's Saber

- Mike Sullivan (1977, 1978)
- Luke LaValle (1998)
- Gabor Szelle (2000)
- Luke Linder (2021, 2023, 2024)
- Ahmed Hesham (2026)

== Year-by-year results ==
The following is a list of Notre Dame's all-time season records. Note that women's fencing was club status from 1972 (the year Notre Dame became coed) to 1975, becoming varsity in the 1976 season.

Notre Dame Fencing Results by Season
| Season | Conference | Head coach | Men's Overall Record | Women's Overall Record | NCAA Championships (Men) | NCAA Championships (Women) |
|---|---|---|---|---|---|---|
| 1934 | | Pedro DeLandero | 3–5 | | | |
| 1935 | | Pedro DeLandero | 7–0 | | | |
| 1936 | | Pedro DeLandero | 9–0 | | | |
| 1937 | | Pedro DeLandero | 5–3 | | | |
| 1938 | | Pedro DeLandero | 7–2 | | | |
| 1939 | | Pedro DeLandero | 7–2 | | | |
| 1940 | | Walter Langford | 5–4 | | | |
| 1941 | | Walter Langford | 7–2 | | 10th | |
| 1942 | | Walter Langford | 5–3 | | | |
| 1943 | | Walter Langford | 2–4 | | | |
| 1947 | | Herbert Melton | 4–3 | | 13th | |
| 1948 | | Herbert Melton | 9–1 | | 12th | |
| 1949 | | Herbert Melton | 8–1 | | 24th | |
| 1950 | | Herbert Melton | 9–0 | | 6th | |
| 1951 | | Walter Langford | 8–2 | | 10th | |
| 1952 | | Walter Langford | 9–2 | | 16th | |
| 1953 | | Walter Langford | 13–1 | | 7th | |
| 1954 | | Walter Langford | 12–1 | | 8th | |
| 1955 | | Walter Langford | 12–3 | | 8th | |
| 1956 | | Walter Langford | 15–2 | | 15th | |
| 1957 | | Walter Langford | 14–1 | | 9th | |
| 1958 | | Walter Langford | 16–0 | | 6th | |
| 1959 | | Walter Langford | 13–2 | | 8th | |
| 1960 | | Walter Langford | 14–2 | | 7th | |
| 1961 | | Walter Langford | 10–6 | | 13th | |
| 1962 | | Mike DeCicco | 7–8 | | 12th | |
| 1963 | | Mike DeCicco | 14–2 | | 10th | |
| 1964 | | Mike DeCicco | 15–2 | | 5th | |
| 1965 | | Mike DeCicco | 15–2 | | 15th | |
| 1966 | | Mike DeCicco | 17–4 | | | |
| 1967 | | Mike DeCicco | 18–0 | | 6th | |
| 1968 | Great Lakes Conference | Mike DeCicco | 20–1 | | 6th | |
| 1969 | Great Lakes Conference | Mike DeCicco | 16–1 | | 6th | |
| 1970 | Great Lakes Conference | Mike DeCicco | 20–2 | | 8th | |
| 1971 | Great Lakes Conference | Mike DeCicco | 21–3 | | 6th | |
| 1972 | Great Lakes Conference | Mike DeCicco | 19–2 | 2–3 | 8th | |
| 1973 | Great Lakes Conference | Mike DeCicco | 15–3 | 3–2 | 12th | |
| 1974 | Great Lakes Conference | Mike DeCicco | 22–1 | 13–2 | 13th | |
| 1975 | Great Lakes Conference | Mike DeCicco | 23–2 | 8–5 | 3rd | |
| 1976 | Great Lakes Conference | Mike DeCicco | 26–0 | 8–6 | 3rd | |
| 1977 | Great Lakes Conference | Mike DeCicco | 23–0 | 35–10 | 1st | |
| 1978 | Great Lakes Conference | Mike DeCicco | 18–0 | 13–1 | 1st | |
| 1979 | Great Lakes Conference | Mike DeCicco | 20–0 | 14–3 | 2nd | |
| 1980 | Great Lakes Conference | Mike DeCicco | 19–1 | 11–2 | 8th | |
| 1981 | Great Lakes Conference | Mike DeCicco | 21–2 | 16–4 | 5th | |
| 1982 | Great Lakes Conference | Mike DeCicco | 20–1 | 11–8 | 7th | 6th |
| 1983 | Great Lakes Conference | Mike DeCicco | 23–2 | 17–6 | 2nd | 12th |
| 1984 | Great Lakes Conference | Mike DeCicco | 19–1 | 13–5 | 3rd | |
| 1985 | Great Lakes Conference | Mike DeCicco | 23–0 | 12–7 | 2nd | 9th |
| 1986 | Great Lakes Conference | Michael DeCicco, Yves Auriol | 26–0 | 23–0 | 1st | 2nd |
| 1987 | Great Lakes Conference | Michael DeCicco, Yves Auriol | 22–0 | 19–0 | 4th | 1st |
| 1988 | Great Lakes Conference | Michael DeCicco, Yves Auriol | 24–1 | 17–2 | 2nd | 2nd |
| 1989 | Great Lakes Conference | Michael DeCicco, Yves Auriol | 21–0 | 15–1 | 4th | 3rd |
| 1990 | Great Lakes Conference | Michael DeCicco, Yves Auriol | 24–1 | 22–1 | 3rd | |
| 1991 | Great Lakes Conference | Michael DeCicco, Yves Auriol | 23–0 | 19–0 | 3rd | |
| 1992 | Midwest Fencing Conference | Michael DeCicco, Yves Auriol | 14–0 | 11–2 | 4th | |
| 1993 | Midwest Fencing Conference | Michael DeCicco, Yves Auriol | 23–1 | 17–3 | 6th | |
| 1994 | Midwest Fencing Conference | Michael DeCicco, Yves Auriol | 21–0 | 35–2 | 1st | |
| 1995 | Midwest Fencing Conference | Michael DeCicco, Yves Auriol | 24–2 | 28–0 | 3rd | |
| 1996 | Midwest Fencing Conference | Yves Auriol | 23–2 | 26–1 | 2nd | |
| 1997 | Midwest Fencing Conference | Yves Auriol | 24–2 | 29–1 | 2nd | |
| 1998 | Midwest Fencing Conference | Yves Auriol | 25–1 | 24–1 | 2nd | |
| 1999 | Midwest Fencing Conference | Yves Auriol | 22–1 | 19–4 | 2nd | |
| 2000 | Midwest Fencing Conference | Yves Auriol | 18–2 | 18–2 | 2nd | |
| 2001 | Midwest Fencing Conference | Yves Auriol | 25–0 | 21–4 | 3rd | |
| 2002 | Midwest Fencing Conference | Yves Auriol | 18–0 | 20–2 | 3rd | |
| 2003 | Midwest Fencing Conference | Janusz Bednarski | 24–0 | 22–2 | 1st | |
| 2004 | Midwest Fencing Conference | Janusz Bednarski | 24–1 | 26–0 | 3rd | |
| 2005 | Midwest Fencing Conference | Janusz Bednarski | 21–3 | 22–2 | 1st | |
| 2006 | Midwest Fencing Conference | Janusz Bednarski | 29–1 | 29–1 | 4th | |
| 2007 | Midwest Fencing Conference | Janusz Bednarski | 19–5 | 24–4 | 4th | |
| 2008 | Midwest Fencing Conference | Janusz Bednarski | 27–4 | 29–2 | 2nd | |
| 2009 | Midwest Fencing Conference | Janusz Bednarski | 33–0 | 30–2 | 2nd | |
| 2010 | Midwest Fencing Conference | Janusz Bednarski | 33–0 | 35–0 | 3rd | |
| 2011 | Midwest Fencing Conference | Janusz Bednarski | 29–1 | 29–0 | 1st | |
| 2012 | Midwest Fencing Conference | Janusz Bednarski | 29–6 | 25–6 | 3rd | |
| 2013 | Midwest Fencing Conference | Janusz Bednarski | 19–7 | 26–1 | 2nd | |
| 2014 | Midwest Fencing Conference | Janusz Bednarski | 21–6 | 18–8 | 6th | |
| 2015 | Atlantic Coast Conference | Gia Kvaratskhelia | 26–6 | 32–2 | 3rd | |
| 2016 | Atlantic Coast Conference | Gia Kvaratskhelia | 35–3 | 38–0 | 5th | |
| 2017 | Atlantic Coast Conference | Gia Kvaratskhelia | 30–8 | 35–4 | 1st | |
| 2018 | Atlantic Coast Conference | Gia Kvaratskhelia | 30–7 | 37–2 | 1st | |
| 2019 | Atlantic Coast Conference | Gia Kvaratskhelia | 30–5 | 34–2 | 3rd | |
| 2020 | Atlantic Coast Conference | Gia Kvaratskhelia | 35–8 | 38–7 | Cancelled due to the coronavirus pandemic | |
| 2021 | Atlantic Coast Conference | Gia Kvaratskhelia | 11–0 | 16–0 | 1st | |
| 2022 | Atlantic Coast Conference | Gia Kvaratskhelia | 41–0 | 45–3 | 1st | |
| 2023 | Atlantic Coast Conference | Gia Kvaratskhelia | 37–4 | 35–5 | 1st | |
| 2024 | Atlantic Coast Conference | Gia Kvaratskhelia | 37–6 | 35–10 | 2nd | |
| 2025 | Atlantic Coast Conference | Gia Kvaratskhelia | 36–2 | 33–1 | 1st | |
| 2026 | Atlantic Coast Conference | Gia Kvaratskhelia | 26–3 | 28–1 | 1st | 1st |

== Facilities ==
=== Castellan Family Fencing Center ===
After the Notre Dame Fighting Irish men's ice hockey team moved from the Joyce Center to the Compton Family Ice Arena in 2011, the vacated facilities were renovated and opened as the Castellan Family Fencing Center in 2012. The facility consists of 15 permanent strips in front of bleacher seating, under which features separate men's, women's and coaches' locker rooms, an armory repair room, team lounge and kitchen area, an enclosed conference room and individual coaches offices.

Prior to 2012, the Irish trained on the second floor of the Joyce Center and hosted home matches opposite the hockey rink on portable strips.

== The Winning Streak ==
From 1975 to 1980, the Irish won 122 straight regular season matches, surpassing John Wooden's 88 consecutive basketball wins to set the NCAA varsity sports winning streak record, a record not broken for over a decade. (Interestingly, UCLA lost to Austin Carr's Notre Dame team in 1971, then went undefeated until Adrian Dantley's Notre Dame team in 1974). During the streak, the Irish won their first national championship in 1977 and again in 1978.
