= Wayne State Warriors =

- University: Wayne State University
- Nickname: Warriors
- NCAA: Division II
- Conference: GLIAC (primary); CCFC (fencing)
- Athletic director: Erika Wallace
- Location: Detroit, Michigan
- Varsity teams: 8 men's & 10 women's
- Football stadium: Tom Adams Field
- Basketball arena: Wayne State Fieldhouse
- Baseball stadium: Harwell Baseball Field
- Colors: Green and gold
- Mascot: W the Warrior
- Website: wsuathletics.com

The Wayne State Warriors are the athletic teams that represent Wayne State University, located in Detroit, Michigan, in NCAA Division II intercollegiate sporting competitions. The Warriors compete as members of the Great Lakes Intercollegiate Athletic Conference (GLIAC) for all 16 varsity sports. The Warriors have been members of the GLIAC since 1975.

== History ==
The Wayne State intercollegiate athletics program was established in 1917 by director of athletics David L. Holmes, when the school was known as Detroit Junior College. Revered by his athletes, Holmes initially coached all sports. His track teams were nationally known into the 1950s; in his first ten years, he produced two Olympians from the school's Victorian-era gym. Although he had major ambitions for Wayne and scheduled such teams as Notre Dame and Penn State in the 1920s, the lack of facilities and money for athletics kept the athletic program small.

In 1927, three years after the school was renamed the College of the City of Detroit, a student poll selected the name of "Tartars" for the school's teams, which were generally known as the Detroit Tartars. In 1934, the college became Wayne University, with athletic teams known as the Wayne Tartars until 1956 when the school became Wayne State University and athletic teams were called the Wayne State Tartars. The Tartars nickname lasted until 1999 when the university changed it to "Warriors" due to a feeling that the Tartar name was dated and that not many people knew what a Tartar was.

As the Detroit Tartars, the school competed in the Michigan Collegiate Conference from 1927 to 1931. In 1946, Wayne University was a founding member of the Mid-American Conference, but only played one season in the conference before leaving in 1947. In 1955 the university, along with John Carroll University, Case Institute of Technology, and Western Reserve University formed the Presidents' Athletic Conference (PAC). The University competed in the PAC until 1967 before competing as an independent program and joining the upstart Great Lakes Intercollegiate Athletic Conference (GLIAC) in 1975.

== Varsity sports ==
The Wayne State University Athletic Department sponsors the following sports:

| Men's sports | Women's sports |
|---|---|
| Baseball | Basketball |
| Basketball | Cross country |
| Cross country | Fencing |
| Fencing | Golf |
| Football | Softball |
| Golf | Swimming and diving |
| Swimming and diving | Tennis |
| Tennis | Track and field |
| | Volleyball |
| | Soccer |
† – Track and field includes both indoor and outdoor

=== Baseball ===
Wayne State has had 7 Major League Baseball draft selections since the draft began in 1965.

| Year | Player | Round | Team |
|---|---|---|---|
| 1970 | Terence Cupples | 42 | Twins |
| 1973 | John Shupe | 10 | Yankees |
| 1974 | Gregory Boos | 30 | Mets |
| 2005 | Steven Squires | 49 | White Sox |
| 2008 | Anthony Bass | 5 | Padres |
| 2011 | Brett Shankin | 28 | Mariners |
| 2019 | Hunter Brown | 5 | Astros |

=== Fencing ===
Fencing for Wayne State, future two-time Olympican Byron Krieger was Wayne State's first Intercollegiate Fencing Association/NCAA champion in foil in 1942. Future three-time Olympian Allan Kwartler also fenced at Wayne State.

=== Football ===
Wayne State football competes with the other sports in the GLIAC, the program also competed in the PAC from 1955 to 1967 and in the Midwest Intercollegiate Football Conference from 1990 to 1998. Wayne State has won three conference championships, one in the GLIAC and two PAC championships. The Warriors played in the Division II National Championship game in 2011, losing to the Pittsburg State Gorillas, 35-21.

Notable NFL alumni include: Vic Zucco, Richard Byas, Jr., Paul Butcher, Sr., Tom Beer, and Joique Bell.

=== Ice hockey ===
Wayne State previously competed in men's and women's NCAA Division I ice hockey as a member of College Hockey America (CHA). The university dropped their men's program at the end of the 2007–08 season, followed in 2011 by ending the women's hockey program.

== Championships ==
=== National Championships ===
| Fencing (M) | 1975, 1979, 1980, 1982, 1983, 1984, 1985 |
| Fencing (W) | 1982, 1988, 1989 |
| Swimming (W) | 2012 |

- Note: Although WSU competes at the DII level, the NCAA combines all three divisions for its National Fencing Championships.

=== Conference Championships ===
i. GLIAC Championships:

| Baseball | 1980, 1981, 1982, 1998, 2005, 2008, 2010, 2023 |
| Basketball (M) | 1984, 1986, 1988, 1992, 1993, 1994, 1999, 2010, 2021 |
| Basketball (W) | 1980, 1981 |
| Cross Country (M) | 2001 |
| Football | 1976 |
| Golf (M) | 2004, 2009 |
| Softball | 1981, 1983, 1985, 1986, 1988, 1989, 1990, 1992, 1993, 1994, 1995, 1996, 2002, 2003, 2006, 2007, 2008, 2010 |
| Swimming (M) | 2003, 2004, 2006, 2007, 2009, 2011, 2012, 2013, 2014 |
| Swimming (W) | 2006, 2007, 2008, 2010, 2011, 2012, 2013, 2014, 2015 |
| Track and Field (Indoor) | 1976, 1977 |
| Track and Field (Outdoor) | 1975, 1976, 1977 |
| Tennis (M) | 1975, 1976, 1977, 1978, 1980, 1981, 2019, 2022 |
| Tennis (W) | 1975, 1976, 1977, 1978, 1979, 1980, 1982, 1983, 2014, 2018, 2019, 2022 |
| Volleyball (W) | 1980, 1981, 1982, 1997, 1998, 1999 |

ii. President's Athletic Conference Championships:

| Baseball | 1959 |
| Cross Country (M) | 1960, 1961, 1963 |
| Football | 1957, 1965 |
| Golf (M) | 1947 |
| Swimming (M) | 1963, 1964, |
| Tennis (M) | 1956, 1957, 1958, 1959, 1960, 1961, 1963, 1964 |

iii. College Hockey America:

| Ice Hockey (M) | 2001, 2002, 2003 |
| Ice Hockey (W) | 2008 |
