= Penn Quakers fencing =

American college fencing team

- First season: 1925
- Head coach: Andy Ma; 14th season, 521–
- Home stadium: Hutchinson Gym
- Location: Philadelphia, PA
- League: NCAA Division I
- Conference: Ivy League
- National Titles: 3
- Conference titles: 16
- Rivalries: Princeton Tigers
- All-Americans: 116
- Fight song: Fight on, Pennsylvania!
- Website: pennathletics.com

The Penn Quakers fencing team is the intercollegiate fencing team for the University of Pennsylvania, located in Philadelphia, Pennsylvania. The team competes in the Ivy League, within the NCAA Division I.

The university first fielded a team in 1925. The team is coached by Andy Ma, former coach of several members of the Chinese National Fencing Team.

== History ==
Penn has historically fielded a strong fencing team, capturing the national title three times since the program's inception in 1925. The program has produced 11 Olympians, most recently Cliff Bayer and Tamir Bloom in 2000.

== Notable former fencers ==
Notable alumni include:

- Cliff Bayer (born 1977), 2-time Olympian, NCAA foil champion, 4-time US Champion
- Tamir Bloom (born 1971), 2-time Olympian
- Harold Van Buskirk (1894-1980), 3-time Olympian, US epee champion
- Paul Friedberg (born 1959), Olympian, 3-time NCAA saber champion, Maccabiah Games champion, Pan American Games champion.
- Shaul Gordon (born 1994), Canadian-Israeli Olympic sabre fencer
- Brooke Makler (1951–2010), Olympian, NCAA foil champion. 2-time Pan American Games champion.
- Paul Makler, Jr. (born 1946), Olympian, 2-time NCAA champion
- Paul Makler Sr. (born 1920), Olympian
- Dave Micahnik (born 1938), 3-time Olympian, US epee champion, 3-time Maccabiah Games champion
- Steve Netburn (born 1943), 2-time Olympian
- Chris O'Loughlin (born 1967), Olympian, NCAA epee champion, US epee champion, Maccabiah Games silver medalist, Pan American Games bronze medalist
- J. Brooks B. Parker (1889–1951), 2-time Olympian
