= List of American sabre fencers =

This is a list of American Sabreurs. (Only noted and contemporary American sabreurs are included):

- Armitage, Norman
- Becker, Christine
- Eli Dershwitz
- John Friedberg
- Paul Friedberg
- Joel Glucksman
- Green, Charlotte "Sherry"
- Jacobson, Emily
- Jacobson, Sada
- Kovacs, Stephen (1972–2022)
- Kwartler, Allan S.
- Lee, Ivan (born 1981; banned for life by SafeSport in 2025)
- Morehouse, Tim
- Muhammad, Ibtihaj
- Rogers, Jason
- Smart, Keeth
- Spencer-El, Akhi
- Elizabeth Tartakovsky
- Thompson, Caity
- Ward, Rebecca
- Westbrook, Peter (1952–2024)
- Williams, James
- Worth, George
- Zagunis, Mariel

== See also ==
- Sabre
- Fencing
- List of American epee fencers
- List of American foil fencers
- USFA
- USFA Hall of Fame
