= Curtis McDowald =

American fencer

Personal information
- Nationality: United States
- Born: January 23, 1996 (age 30) Queens, New York City, United States

Sport
- Sport: Fencing
- Event: épée
- College team: St. John’s University
- Club: Peter Westbrook Foundation
Medal record
Men's fencing
Representing United States
Pan American Games
Gold medal – first place	2023 Santiago	Team épée

Curtis McDowald (born January 23, 1996) is an American épée fencer. He competed in the 2020 Summer Olympics. In August 2025, McDowald was suspended by USA Fencing for a five-year period for conduct violations.

== Early life ==
McDowald was born in Jamaica, Queens, New York. His mother, Demetria Goodwin, works at the Riker's Island jail. He attended the Dwight School, a college preparatory school on Central Park West on Manhattan's Upper West Side in New York City, for high school.

== Fencing career ==
=== Early years ===
McDowald began fencing at 12 years of age. He attended St. John's University ('18), in Queens, New York, where he fenced for the St. John's Red Storm. His fencing club was the Peter Westbrook Foundation.

In 2017, the Queens Newsletter reported that former Olympic bronze medalist Peter Westbrook "remembered a much different McDowald, a young and smug one, when he began fencing. He recalled his initial doubts about his character... 'Now, he’s become humble,' Westbrook said. 'One day, Curtis is going to make that Olympic team. Before, he couldn’t because his pride and ego got in the way. We smacked that out of him...'"

In June 2018 he won a bronze medal in épée at the 2018 Pan American Fencing Championships. In March 2019 McDowald won a bronze medal at a Buenos Aires Fencing World Cup in Argentina.

=== 2020—24; Olympics and temporary suspension ===
He competed in the 2020 Tokyo Olympics, where he lost in his opening round of individual épée, and fenced with the US épée squad that lost in its opening round of team épée. In 2021, a GQ journalist described his personal admiration for McDowald, but noted that he was in the minority and that one commenter feared McDowald's approach to fencing would lead to it being "full of disrespectful trash players." In June 2023 McDowald was ranked 57th in the world in épée.

In June 2023, USA Today reported that McDowald through his misbehavior may have destroyed the opportunity of his entire Team USA men's épée squad to compete at the 2024 Paris Olympics. McDowald was fencing as part of the squad in the semi-finals at the Pan American Fencing Championships in Lima, Peru. After he was penalized for misbehavior and lost the match, when his opponent extended his hand seeking a post-match handshake, instead McDowald angrily slapped the fencer's hand. He then had an angry outburst and kicked a free-standing banner adjacent to the competition area, putting his foot through it, and engaged in what USA Fencing described as “other actions”. Because of his actions, the entire U.S. men's épée team was completely disqualified, preventing it from competing in the bronze-medal match, and was not given a finishing position at the tournament. It was thereby stripped of its accumulated points, and left with zero Olympic qualifying points. The U.S. had entered the Games as the second highest-ranked team in the event.

USA Fencing released a statement: "We are disappointed by Curtis's actions and regret that they have harmed Team USA's chances of fielding a men's épée team for the 2024 Olympics." It also announced that McDowald would not be eligible to compete at the 2023 Fencing World Championships. In fact, the men's épée team did not qualify for the Paris Olympics.

In the fall of 2023, McDowald competed at the 2023 Pan American Games in Santiago, Chile, as a member of the U.S. men's épée team that won the gold medal. He was required to stay in a separate hotel away from the Athlete Village due to an incident unrelated to his later temporary suspension.

Subsequently, on November 3, 2023, McDowald was temporarily suspended by USA Fencing due to allegations that he had engaged in misconduct. He was prohibited during his temporary suspension from being present at any USA Fencing sanctioned event, club, meeting, facility, education session, or otherwise. SafeSport administratively closed the case in January 2024 after completing its investigation into the matter.

=== 2025—present; five-year suspension ===
In August 2025, McDowald was suspended by USA Fencing for a five-year period because he had committed a number of violations of USA Fencing's Code of Conduct and Athlete Code of Conduct.

== See also ==
- Alen Hadzic, American fencer suspended by SafeSport
- Ivan Lee, American fencer suspended by SafeSport
