= Mauro Hamza =

Egyptian fencer

Biographical details
- Born: 1965 or 1966 (age 59–60); Cairo, Egypt

Coaching career (HC unless noted)
- 1994: Texas A&M
- 1995–2014: Rice University

Accomplishments and honors

Awards
- 2004 Egyptian National Foil Coach

Maher "Mauro" Hamza (born 1965 or 1966 (age 59–60)) is a fencing coach who was born in Cairo, Egypt. He coached at Texas A&M, Rice University, for US national teams, and for the Egyptian Olympic team.

== Biography ==
=== 1994–2014 ===
In 1994, Hamza coached at Texas A&M for one year.

Hamza then served as Fencing Program Coordinator at Rice University from 1995 to 2014. He spent three years serving the Southwest fencing community as volunteer Chairman of the Gulf Coast Division.

In August 1999, he established a youth fencing club, Salle Mauro, in Houston, Texas, where he lived.

Hamza was head coach of the 2001 United States Junior/Cadet national fencing team. Hamza was the Egyptian Olympic coach for the men’s and women’s foil teams at the Athens Olympics in 2004, and was the United States Fencing Association Men’s Foil National Coach 2009–10; then USA Fencing Foil Director for Men’s and Women’s National teams in 2010–11. In 2009, December 26 was declared “Mauro Hamza Day” by Houston mayor Bill White in recognition of his development of the sport of fencing in Houston.

=== 2014–present ===
On December 3, 2014, Hamza's membership with USA Fencing was suspended until December 4, 2019, or until certain conditions were met, whichever would be later. His suspension was for unspecified sexual misconduct in Houston.

Five years later, in 2019 his suspension was extended by the U.S. Center for SafeSport for “Allegations of Misconduct”.

In 2020, Hamza was the technical director of the Egyptian National Fencing Team. In 2021, Hamza was coaching in Egypt, and was the technical director leading the Egyptian National Youth Fencing Team. He coaches his son Mohamed Hamza, who fences for the Egyptian national fencing team and fenced for Princeton University.

In March 2021, a once aspiring Olympic fencer filed a civil lawsuit in Maricopa County Superior Court in Arizona against him accusing Hamza of sexually assaulting her in the 1990s when she was a minor. The lawsuit was moved to the United States District Court for the District of Arizona, and settled in December 2022 by Hamza and the US Fencing Association.

== See also ==
- Alen Hadzic, fencer ruled permanently ineligible by SafeSport due to sexual misconduct
- Ivan Lee, fencer ruled permanently ineligible by SafeSport due to sexual misconduct
