= List of American épée fencers =

This is a list of American épée fencers. (Only noted and contemporary American épée fencers are included):

- Tamir Bloom
- Benjamin Bratton
- Aleina Edwards
- Kelley Hurley
- Weston Seth Kelsey
- Maya Lawrence
- Fred Linkmeyer
- Michael Marx
- Robert Marx
- George Gabriel Masin
- Cody Mattern
- John Moreau
- Jon Normile
- Chris O'Loughlin
- Arlene Stevens
- Robert Ernest Stull
- Soren Thompson
- Albert Wolff

== See also ==
- Fencing
- List of American sabre fencers
- List of American foil fencers
- USFA
- USFA Hall of Fame
