= Sean McClain =

American fencer (born 1975)

Personal information
- Born: September 13, 1975 (age 50) Round Rock, Texas, United States

Sport
- Sport: Fencing
Medal record
Representing United States
Pan American Games
Silver medal – second place	1995 Mar del Plata	Individual foil

Michael Sean McClain (born September 13, 1975) is an American foil fencer who attended Stanford University in the 1990s.

He moved out of his home in Round Rock, Texas, at the age of 14 to train in New York to pursue his dreams.

He fenced for Stanford University in the 1990s and is one of only three fencers to win a USFA Division I National Championship title in two weapons in recent history.

He was a fencing coach at the Fencing Academy of Westchester, and is now coaching at Empire United Fencing, in New York City, which he founded along with 2004 Olympian Jed Dupree.

== Accomplishments ==
- 1994 U.S. Men's Épée Champion
- 1995 NCAA Division I Men's Foil Champion
- 1995 Pan-Am Games Silver Medal, Men's Foil
- 2001 US Men's Foil Champion

== See also ==
- List of American foil fencers
- List of NCAA fencing champions
- USFA
- List of USFA Hall of Fame members
