= Gay Jacobsen D'Asaro =

American fencer

Personal information
- Born: 7 October 1954 (age 71) Modesto, California, United States

Sport
- Sport: Fencing
Medal record
Women's fencing
Representing United States
Pan American Games
Bronze medal – third place	1979 San Juan	Team foil
USFA National Championships
Gold medal – first place	1973	Under 20 Individual Foil
Gold medal – first place	1974	Individual Foil
Gold medal – first place	1978	Individual Foil

Gay Kristine Jacobsen D'Asaro (now Gay MacLellan) is an American Olympic foil fencer.

She attended the University of California, Santa Barbara from 1972 to 1974 and fenced as a member of the UC Santa Barbara Gauchos. She later transferred and fenced for San Jose State University in the late 1970s and early 1980s. She holds a record for two National Titles, and was a 1-rated Referee. She was inducted into the USFA Hall of Fame in 2004. As a child, she lived in Ripon, California, and later, lived in Ashland, Oregon, where she taught private fencing lessons. She was a student of coach Michael D'Asaro Sr., whom she later married. As of 2006, she no longer uses last name D'Asaro, and now goes by her married name: Gay (Jacobsen) MacLellan.

== Accomplishments ==
- 1973 "Under 20" National Champion
- 1973 World Championships
- 1974 U.S. Women's Foil National Champion
- 1975 NIWFA Pan American Team Member
- 1976 U.S. Olympic Team Foil Fencer
- 1978 U.S. Women's Foil National Champion
- 1979 NIWFA Pan American Team Member (won Bronze medal)
- 1980 U.S. Olympic Team Foil Fencer

- Because of Jimmy Carter's ban on the 1980 Moscow Summer Olympic Games, D'Asaro and the rest of her Olympic Fencing team did not compete in the games. She was one of 461 athletes to receive a Congressional Gold Medal instead.

== Honors ==
- UC Santa Barbara Hall of Fame (Fencing 1972–74)
- 2001-2005 Appointed to USFA Fencing Officials Commission
- 2002 Olympian Procession at Oregon Sports Authority
- 2004 Inducted into United States Fencing Association Hall of Fame

== Academic work ==
- A History of the Amateur Fencers League of America. D'Asaro, G.K.J. 1983. A history of the Amateur Fencers League of America. Unpublished thesis, Ph.D. dissertation. (U860 .D37, San Jose State University)

== See also ==
- List of American foil fencers
- USFA
- List of USFA Hall of Fame members
