= Csaba Elthes =

Hungarian fencer (1912–1995)

Maestro Csaba Elthes (March 10, 1912 – November 8, 1995) was a Hungarian fencing master who emigrated to the U.S. in 1956. Elthes trained many Olympic competitors in the 1960s through 1980s, including the only U.S. Olympic fencing medalist of the period, Peter Westbrook (bronze medal in 1984).

== Early life ==
Born in Budapest, Hungary, Elthes earned a degree in law from University of Budapest in 1936. In 1956, political turmoil in Hungary caused him to leave his wife and two daughters and flee to the west via the Brücke von Andau. He arrived in the United States and was detained for 60 days.

== In the USA ==
Determining that he would not be able to find work as a lawyer in the United States, he decided that fencing might be a good way to make a living. Investigating the competitions of the time, he realized that while American foil fencing was already at a fairly high level (he cited Olympians Albie Axelrod and Daniel Bukantz in particular), there were opportunities in sabre and epee, and he quickly found employment at the salle of maestro Giorgio Santelli in New York City.

Elthes and Santelli were largely (but not solely) responsible for making the New York City area the center of US sabre fencing for most of their careers; Elthes was a US Olympic fencing coach in 1964, 1968, 1972, 1976, and 1984. As late as 1992, the entire US Olympic sabre team was based at NYC salles and clubs. Elthes generally gave lessons both at the Fencers Club and at the New York Athletic Club. For at least three years (1968-71) he was the fencing coach at Pace University.

== Teaching style ==
In his teaching, Elthes stressed balance and footwork, and treated fencing as an intellectual pursuit as well as an athletic one. When teaching, he often gave very few verbal instructions, indicating that the student should attempt to strike by exposing a potential target, or illustrating the weakness of a student's attack with a well-placed stop-cut.

The Hungarian school of instruction practiced by Elthes was famed for discipline, sarcasm, and competitiveness, but always making it clear that there was respect between teacher and student (as exemplified by Elthes frequently calling students "Mr. Sir" (pronounced "Meester Sore" due to his heavy Hungarian accent), which tended to create fierce loyalty.

Students got more instructor time the better their performance. Former student and longtime friend of Elthes, Olympian Robert Blum noted "Occasional verbal insults were received as gratuities!"

Personal courage and disregard for discomfort were also part of the formula; for very advanced students, Elthes sometimes gave lessons without a mask, and nearly all serious students were disciplined by being hit with a sabre, sometimes hard enough to draw blood; Danny Bukantz' son Jeff, a student from the 1970s, notes "I think I may have been the only student that Csaba didn't hit. I always thought it might have been because my father was his dentist".

Peter Westbrook quit working with Elthes after three months in 1972, unwilling to tolerate the maestro's teaching style. He initially found Elthes to be intimidating, saying: "Csaba's theory is discipline with pain. Never a compliment, usually belittlement. I was stunned." It went beyond unkind words: "I thought he was crazy. Then he started hitting me in the legs with his sabre every time I made a mistake, and I was wearing short pants, too. He said, 'I want you to associate mistakes with pain.` And then, whack, whack, whack. Right across the thighs. Then I knew he was crazy."

The following year, Westbrook began working with Elthes again, and Elthes no longer struck him, coaching him to his first of 13 US National Sabre titles in 1974.

Of him, Westbrook wrote;

Csaba believed in me and worked me like a dog, goading me, inspiring me, always pushing me beyond what I thought I could or would do. I was lucky to have had 8 years with Csaba in his prime before his stroke in 1980. The stroke paralyzed his right hand so he taught w/his left until he recovered some use in his right. Csaba came to love New York and his life here in the U.S., he went back to Hungary every year on vacation to visit his daughters from his first wife and family, but New York was his home. He never lost that formality between us, just the one time (May 1977) when he punctured my throat by accident, the only time I have ever seen him cry or drop his formality with me.

== Hall of Fame and beyond ==
Elthes was inducted into the USFA Hall of Fame in 1978.

In 1980, the United States boycotted the Olympic Games in Moscow. Elthes and the US Fencing team instead went on a State Department sponsored trip to China, spending three weeks traveling through four different provinces competing against China's top teams. Later that year, Elthes suffered a stroke, paralyzing his right hand, but he learned to teach with his left until he had recovered some use of the right, and switched hands as needed for the rest of his career.

In 1981, his student Michael Lofton becomes US Junior Olympic sabre champion, beginning a career as one of the United States' top fencers.

His passion for fencing and competition never wavered; in 1994, he convinced Peter Westbrook to train for and participate in the 1995 Pan American Games, where Westbrook won a gold medal at the age of 42.

Elthes died of a stroke in 1995 when visiting his home city of Budapest. He was survived by his second wife, Baba, who resides in New York.

Among Elthes' students are US Olympic competitors Westbrook, George Worth, Robert Blum, Allan Kwartler, Marty Lang, Paul Apostol, Mika'il Sankofa (formerly Michael Lofton), and Steve Mormando, as well as Olympic fencing referee and Maccabiah Games medalist Russell Wilson.

== See also ==
- USFA
- List of USFA Hall of Fame members
