= Stephen Kovacs =

American champion fencer (1972–2022)

- Born: January 4, 1972
- Died: January 15, 2022 (aged 50); Somerset County Jail, Somerville, New Jersey, US
- Education: Columbia University ('95)
- Occupation: Fencing coach
- Years active: 2007–21
- Employer: Ridge High School
- Known for: Junior national champion saber fencer; later a fencing coach; arrested for sexual assault of two teenage students; died in jail.
- Criminal charges: two counts of 2nd degree sexual assault; two counts of 3rd degree endangering the welfare of a child.; felony 4th degree false swearing
- Awards: 1989 United States Fencing Association (USFA) Under-17 saber champion; 1990 USFA Under-20 (Junior) saber champion; NCAA All American in saber (1991, 1993, 1994); 1993 USFA saber team championship

Stephen Matias Kovacs (January 4, 1972 – January 15, 2022) was an American saber fencer and fencing coach. He was a three-time NCAA All American for Columbia University, four-time All-Ivy League, and the first fencer to win four consecutive Intercollegiate Fencing Association championships. As a fencing coach, he then coached at the Pingry School, Princeton Junior School, Stevens Institute of Technology, Duke University, Ridge High School, and private fencing clubs including one that he founded. In October 2021 he was arrested and charged with multiple counts of sexual assault, endangering the welfare of a child, and false swearing, and imprisoned in the Somerset County Jail in Somerville, New Jersey. On October 29, 2021, the United States Center for SafeSport temporarily suspended Kovacs, pending an investigation by it of allegations against him. On January 15, 2022, Kovacs committed suicide (aged 50) in Somerset County Jail.

== Early life ==
Kovacs' hometown was Hampton, in Hunterdon County, New Jersey, and he later lived in Clifton, in Passaic County and in Watchung in Somerset County. He attended North Hunterdon High School.

In 1989, Kovacs won the United States Fencing Association (USFA) Under-17 saber championship, and in 1990 he won the USFA Under-20 (Junior) saber championship. He was coached at the New York Athletic Club by Vasil Etropolski, the 1983 saber world champion from Bulgaria.

== College career ==
Kovacs then attended Columbia University ('95) in New York City, where he majored in Eastern European History and Economics. There, he fenced for the Columbia Lions fencing team from 1990 to 1994, and was team captain. He overcame a serious fencing injury, after in 1992 suffering a rupture of his Achilles tendon while lunging during a college tournament.

In 1994 he became the first fencer to win four consecutive Intercollegiate Fencing Association championships, and came in fourth in the NCAA Saber Championship; Kovacs was also an NCAA First Team All American in 1991, 1993, and 1994, and was four-time First Team All-Ivy League (in 1991–94). In 1994, when he was 22 years old, The New York Times reported that he was thought to have a good shot at making the 1996 US Olympic fencing team. Columbia presented him with its Outstanding Senior Athlete Award and the George Cointe Award for Sportsmanship and Excellence.

Kovacs was also part of the New York Athletic Club saber team led by Olympians Paul Friedberg and John Friedberg that won the 1993 USFA saber team championship.

== Professional career ==
Early in his career, Kovacs was a securities trader for Datek/Heartland Securities from 1996 to 1997, Assent LLC from 2008 to 2009, WTS Proprietary Trading Group from 2010 to 2013, and Tradescape/E*TRADE.

From 2007 to 2008, Kovacs taught sixth grade Humanities and began his coaching career by coaching fencing at the Pingry School in the Basking Ridge section of Bernards Township, in Somerset County, New Jersey. He left to work in business on Wall Street.

In August 2009, Kovacs was named the head men's fencing coach at Stevens Institute of Technology in Hoboken, New Jersey. The team had a 13–7 record for the season. At the same time, Kovacs served as an assistant saber coach at the New York Athletic Club.

In August 2010, Kovacs became an Assistant Fencing Coach at Duke, in Durham, North Carolina, a position he held through 2013. There he mentored three-time NCAA women's saber champion Becca Ward.

In 2013, Kovacs joined the staff of Medeo Fencing Club in Bridgewater, in Somerset County, New Jersey.

In 2013–18, Kovacs was also a fifth grade teacher and taught fencing to girls and boys at the Princeton Junior School, in Princeton, in Mercer County, New Jersey.

In 2018, Kovacs founded and thereafter owned Kaprica United Fencing Academy in Bound Brook, in Somerset County, New Jersey, where he was head coach.

Kovacs was appointed the Ridge High School head boys’ fencing coach by the Bernards Township School District on November 11, 2019, for a salary of $8,542. The school is in the Basking Ridge section of Bernards Township, in Somerset County, New Jersey. The boys and girls fencing teams practice together and go to meets together. In January 2020, the boys' team won the overall title in the Cetrullo Tournament, New Jersey's most important regular-season tournament. He was head coach through February 2021. A number of fencers on the school team attended the nearby Kaprica Fencing Academy, which Kovacs owned and where he was head coach.

== Arrests and SafeSport suspension ==
=== Arrests ===
On October 13, 2021, Kovacs was arrested at the Somerset County (New Jersey) Prosecutor's Office by detectives from the Bridgewater Township Sex Crimes/Child Abuse Unit for allegedly sexually assaulting two teenagers. His encounters with both teenagers took place in his capacity as a fencing coach, within Bridgewater Township in Somerset County.

A 16-year-old girl reported being sexually assaulted by Kovacs in Bridgewater multiple times in August and September 2021. An affidavit of probable cause filed by police in support of charges against Kovacs said that he first preyed on teens while on long-distance trips with them for competitions. The affidavit said that Kovacs assaulted the 16-year-old in May 2019, at a competition in Salt Lake City, Utah that due to its distance from New Jersey required an overnight stay. It said that she reported that on three occasions in August 2021, Kovacs picked her up at her home and then drove her to a parking lot in Bridgewater to sexually assault her. In September 2021, Kovacs was "provided temporary shelter" at the girl's Somerset County home for five nights. On at least three of those nights, Kovacs allegedly sexually assaulted her. He also allegedly sexually assaulted her in Bound Brook days later. Soon after, Kovacs informed SafeSport that he had an inappropriate relationship with a minor. Kovacs also emailed the girl's parents, telling them he planned to "sell his business and leave," so that they "would not have to worry about him anymore."

In addition, a 19-year-old female teenager reported being sexually assaulted by Kovacs in Bridgewater multiple times from January to December 2020, when she was 18 years old. The affidavit said that Kovacs assaulted her first in April 2019, at a competition in Europe that required an overnight stay. She also said Kovacs sent her a sexually explicit video in January 2020, that showed him viewing her Snapchat account. The teen also said Kovacs sexually assaulted her multiple times during the year in Bound Brook.

Kovacs was charged with two counts of second degree sexual assault and two counts of third degree endangering the welfare of a child, and imprisoned in the Somerset County Jail in Somerville, New Jersey, pending a bail detention hearing.

On October 19, Kovacs was released from jail as a result of his detention hearing.

However, three days after he was released, on October 22, a follow-up investigation determined that Kovacs had given false statements under oath during his detention hearing. Consequently, at his home Kovacs was arrested again. He was charged with felony fourth degree false swearing, and incarcerated once again in the Somerset County Jail, pending a detention hearing.

=== SafeSport suspension ===
As early as September 2021, Kovacs had reported himself to the United States Center for SafeSport, informing them that he had an inappropriate relationship with a minor. SafeSport had been set up under the auspices of the Protecting Young Victims from Sexual Abuse and Safe Sport Authorization Act of 2017, and is charged with addressing the problem of sexual abuse of minors and amateur athletes in sport. Its primary responsibility is to review allegations of sexual misconduct, and to impose sanctions—up to banning a person for their lifetime from involvement in all Olympic sports. On October 29, 2021, SafeSport temporarily suspended Kovacs, pending an investigation by it of allegations against Kovacs.

== Death ==
On January 15, 2022, Kovacs committed suicide in Somerset County Jail. An investigation was initiated. His death was investigated by the Morris County (New Jersey) Prosecutor's Office, to avoid any potential appearance of a conflict of interest. The New Jersey Office of Public Integrity and Accountability, which reports to the New Jersey Attorney General, will support and review the results of the investigation. According to a later lawsuit, the autopsy report stated that he had hanged himself with a laundry bag tied around his neck.

Kovacs was married and had two children. In January 2024, the children filed suit in Somerset County Superior Court, alleging the jail was negligent in not following its suicide prevention policy.

== See also ==
- John David Roy Atchison, US Attorney and children's sports coach, committed suicide by hanging in a Michigan prison after being charged with soliciting sex from a child
- Jeffrey Epstein, suicide by hanging in prison as he awaited trial for alleged sexual abuse of young females
- Ivan Lee, saber fencer and fencing coach who sexually abused female athlete
- Larry Nassar, sexually abused young female athletes
- Ivan Pravilov, coach committed suicide in prison as he awaited trial for alleged sexual abuse of young teenager he coached
