= List of American foil fencers =

This is a list of American foil fencers. (Only noted and contemporary American foil fencers are included):

- Albert Axelrod
- Cliff Bayer
- Daniel Bukantz
- Miles Chamley-Watson
- Emily Cross
- Gay Jacobsen D'Asaro
- Jedediah Dupree
- Nick Evangelista
- Nikki Franke
- Harold Goldsmith
- Jimbo Grimbo
- Race Imboden
- Nick Itkin
- Julia Jones-Pugliese
- Dan Kellner
- Lee Kiefer
- Byron Krieger
- Martin Lang
- David Littell
- Nathaniel Lubell
- Michael Marx
- Alexander Massialas
- Gregory Massialas
- Helene Mayer
- Michael Sean McClain
- Gerek Meinhardt
- Suzanne Paxton
- Janice Romary
- Nicole Ross
- Erinn Smart
- Mark Smith
- Molly Sullivan
- Hanna Thompson
- Jonathan Tiomkin
- Maia Weintraub
- Doris Willette
- Felicia Zimmermann
- Iris Zimmermann

== See also ==
- Fencing
- Foil
- List of American epee fencers
- List of American sabre fencers
- USFA
- USFA Hall of Fame
