= Peter Westbrook =

American fencer (1952–2024)

Peter Jonathan Westbrook
Personal information
- Born: April 16, 1952 St. Louis, Missouri, U.S.
- Died: November 29, 2024 (aged 72) Manhattan, New York City, U.S.
- Height: 5 ft 9 in (175 cm)
- Spouse: Susann Miles-Westbrook

Sport
- Country: United States
- Sport: Fencing
- Event: Saber
- University team: New York University
- Club: Fencers Club
- Coached by: Csaba Elthes
Medal record
Men's fencing
Representing United States
Olympic Games
Bronze medal – third place	1984 Los Angeles	Individual sabre
Pan American Games
Gold medal – first place	1983 Caracas	Individual sabre
Gold medal – first place	1995 Mar del Plata	Individual sabre
Gold medal – first place	1995 Mar del Plata	Team sabre
Silver medal – second place	1975 Mexico City	Team sabre
Silver medal – second place	1979 San Juan	Individual sabre
Silver medal – second place	1979 San Juan	Team sabre
Silver medal – second place	1983 Caracas	Team sabre
Silver medal – second place	1987 Indianapolis	Individual sabre
Silver medal – second place	1987 Indianapolis	Team sabre
Bronze medal – third place	1975 Mexico City	Individual sabre

Peter Jonathan Westbrook (April 16, 1952 – November 29, 2024) was an American saber fencer. He was a 13-time national and 3-time Pan American Games saber champion, five-time Olympian, and an Olympic bronze medalist. He founded the Peter Westbrook Foundation (PWF), a 501(c)(3) non-profit that uses fencing as a vehicle to help young people from under-served New York City communities develop life and academic skills. Westbrook died on November 29, 2024, in Manhattan, New York from liver cancer. He was 72 years old.

== Early life and education ==
Westbrook's father, Ulysses Jonathan Westbrook, was an American G.I. stationed in Japan during the Allied occupation of Japan after World War II when he met Mariko Wado-Westbrook, a Japanese woman, in the city of Kobe. They married in 1950, and soon after they moved to the United States, eventually settling in Newark, New Jersey. Peter and his younger sister Vivian were born in the United States, Peter in St. Louis.

Peter was four when his father left, leaving his mother to raise the family in the Hayes Homes housing project in central Newark. She remained in Newark, given her Japanese relatives’ objection to her returning to Japan with Black children. Raising the children Catholic, Mariko bartered with priests at the local parochial school (St. Peters/Queen of Angels) in exchange for schooling for Peter and Vivian, cleaning the church and assisting on bingo night.

His mother, 66 years old at the time, was killed in December 1993. After she offered friendly advice while on a Newark bus to a 31-year-old, 200-plus pound, fellow female passenger with regard to the young child the woman was traveling with, the woman became angry at her, cursed her, told her to mind her own business, and then pummeled and kicked her to death. Peter Westbrook said: "I have never known such sadness". Her attacker pled guilty to aggravated manslaughter, and was sentenced to 16 years in prison.

== Fencing career ==
=== High school ===
Westbrook's fencing career started at Essex Catholic High School ('70) in Newark, when he was 13 years old, after his mother enrolled him in fencing to keep him out of trouble. He trained under Dr. Samuel D'Ambola, a medical doctor and the founder of the school’s fencing program, winning a New Jersey state individual championship in his junior year.

=== College ===
Westbrook attended New York University's Leonard N. Stern School of Business, where he received a B.S. in Marketing in 1975. He received a full fencing scholarship, and trained under Hugo Castello, the multi-championship-winning coach who as of 1998 held the most wins of any college fencing coach in history.

In 1972, he began training with Csaba Elthes, a Hungarian saber coach who had emigrated to the United States, at the Fencers Club in New York City, but he stopped training with him after one year. He initially found Elthes to be intimidating, saying: "Csaba's theory is discipline with pain. Never a compliment, usually belittlement. I was stunned." It went beyond unkind words: "I thought he was crazy. Then he started hitting me in the legs with his sabre every time I made a mistake, and I was wearing short pants, too. He said, 'I want you to associate mistakes with pain.` And then, whack, whack, whack. Right across the thighs. Then I knew he was crazy." In 1973, he won the NCAA saber championship, and the NYU team won the team championship. Recognizing that his short time with Csaba had been beneficial, Westbrook returned to Csaba; as he recalled, "after a year, it just wasn`t the same. I knew I needed him. I couldn`t believe it, but I did."

=== National championships ===
Westbrook won the U.S. National Men's Sabre Championship 13 times (1974–75, 1979–86, 1988–89, and 1995). In 1974, as a college senior, Westbrook placed first at the Amateur Fencers League of America's (now known as USA Fencing) National Championships, beating among others Olympians Alex Orban and Paul Apostol. He was the first black fencer to win the U.S. men's saber national championship. Winning the Nationals made him an internationally recognized fencer.

=== Pan American Games ===
Westbrook competed at the Pan American Games from 1975–95, winning 11 medals (three of them gold medals). In 1975, Westbrook won a team silver medal and an individual bronze medal at the Pan American Games in Mexico City. In 1979, he won a Pan American Games team silver medal. These wins were soon accompanied by his 1983 individual gold medal and team silver medal. From 1987 to 1995, Westbrook won additional silver medals for individual performance (1987), two silver medals for team performance (1987, 1991), and gold medals for individual and team performances (1995).

=== Olympics ===
In 1976, Westbrook competed in his first Olympic Games; thereafter, he was part of every Team USA Olympic fencing team through 1996 (the US chose not to compete in 1980). During pre-competition sparring with a European fencer at the 1976 Montreal Olympics, Westbrook tore two ligaments in his left ankle. He ended the competition ranked 13th.

At the 1984 Los Angeles Olympics, Westbrook won a bronze medal, and was the first American to win an Olympic fencing medal since Al Axelrod won a bronze medal in foil in 1960. He also became the first African American and Asian American to win a medal in fencing.

Westbrook served as flag bearer for the closing ceremonies of the 1992 Olympic Games in Barcelona, Spain.

== Peter Westbrook Foundation ==
=== The PWF Elite Athlete Program ===
Following his competitive fencing career, Westbrook founded and served as CEO of the Peter Westbrook Foundation (PWF), a non-profit that uses fencing as a vehicle to help young people from under-served New York City communities develop life and academic skills. Notable fencers trained by the foundation who have represented the United States at the Olympics include Akhi Spencer-El, Benjamin Bratton, Ibtihaj Muhammad, Daryl Homer, Curtis McDowald, Khalil Thompson, and Lauren Scruggs, who won a foil team gold medal and an individual silver medal in the 2024 Paris Olympics.

In 2000, the foundation was represented internationally for the first time when Ahki Spencer-el, Keeth Smart, and Keeth Smart's sister Erinn Smart qualified for the 2000 Summer Olympics in Sydney, Australia. In 2004 four of the foundation’s fencers, Keeth Smart, Erinn Smart, Kamara James, and Ivan Lee represented the United States in the 2004 Summer Olympics in Athens, Greece. In 2008, Keeth Smart and Erinn Smart represented the United States in the 2008 Summer Olympics in Beijing, China, and both returned home with a silver medal.

Ivan Lee won 2001, 2003, 2005, 2006, and 2008 saber U.S. national championships. Keeth Smart won the 2002 and 2004 national saber championship titles and was ranked # 1 in the world in saber in 2003 (the first-ever American to hold this rank). Erinn Smart won the 1998, 2002, 2004, 2007, and 2008 women's foil national championships, and Kamara James was ranked # 1 in the world in women's épée in 2004. Over 4,000 fencers, including 16 Olympians (five of whom won medals), began fencing at the foundation, which placed athletes on every U.S. Olympic team from the 2000 Sydney Games through the 2024 Paris Games.

=== The PWF Academic Enrichment Program ===
The Peter Westbrook Foundation Academic Enrichment Program provides one-on-one tutorial support, literacy assistance, SAT, PSAT, and specialized high school exam preparation, along with group workshops and productivity seminars on core academic skills, time management, motivational techniques, and homework habits. From October through June, students and tutors meet for 6 to 12 hours each month and students receive extra academic support.

== Writing ==
In 1997, Westbrook published his memoir, Harnessing Anger: The Way of an American Fencer, in which he described turning his childhood experiences into a drive to succeed at his sport, and the inception of the Peter Westbrook Foundation.

In Harnessing Anger, Westbrook told how he came to be the first African American to win a national gold title in sabre fencing, along with his reaching international levels of success. Westbrook described how as the son of an African-American father and a Japanese mother, he was aided by his mother alone in poverty in a Newark ghetto. Becoming a fencer at an early age gave him the confidence and the discipline to use an ancient martial art to his advantage, both in swordplay and when facing the vicissitudes of daily life in the inner city.

Harnessing Anger: The Way of an American Fencer (1997) was nominated by the American Library Association for its Book of the Year Award.

== Death ==
Westbrook died from liver cancer at a hospital in Manhattan, New York, on November 29, 2024, at the age of 72.

== Halls of Fame ==
Westbrook was inducted into the Essex Catholic High School Hall of Fame in 1981, and the New York University Athletics Hall of Fame in 1985. He was inducted into the USFA Hall of Fame in 1996. He was also inducted into the Sports Hall of Fame of New Jersey in 2002, and into the Newark Athletic Hall of Fame in 2003. In 2021, he was inducted into the International Sports Hall of Fame. He was also inducted as a member into the FIE Hall of Fame.

== See also ==
- List of American sabre fencers
- List of NCAA fencing champions
- List of USFA Division I National Champions
- List of Pan American Games medalists in fencing
- List of 1984 Summer Olympics medal winners
- List of USFA Hall of Fame members
- List of athletes with the most appearances at Olympic Games
- List of flag bearers for the United States at the Olympics
