= Zbigniew Czajkowski =

Polish fencing coach (1921–2019)

- Born: 5 February 1921; Modlin, Poland
- Died: 8 February 2019 (aged 98)
- Occupation(s): Fencing Master; Chair of the Fencing Department at the Academy of Physical Education in Katowice, Poland

Zbigniew Czajkowski (5 February 1921 – 8 February 2019) was a Polish fencing coach. Czajkowski was dubbed "Father of the Polish School" of fencing. He coached many champions, including Egon Franke - the first Pole to earn an Olympic gold medal in fencing.

== During the Second World War ==
Czajkowski was born in Modlin and started fencing at the age of 14, while in high school. The outbreak of the Second World War interrupted his fencing career as, immediately after his graduation in 1939, he enlisted in the Polish Navy to fight the Nazis. In September 1939, Czajkowski, along with four other Polish sailors, was captured by the Soviet army and sent for interrogation to the city of Kobryn. He was fortunate to avoid execution as the commissar in Kobryn was not interested in Czajkowski and sent him home. Czajkowski then made his way back to the Soviet controlled Lwów and, while waiting to be allowed to cross the Romanian border to rejoin the Polish forces in France, continued his fencing training. In April 1940, while on his way to the border, Czajkowski was again arrested by Soviet soldiers and this time spent over a year in various Soviet prisons, being interrogated and tortured. He was then sent to the Soviet labor camp in Vorkuta, beyond the polar circle where he survived extremely harsh conditions until, in September 1941, the new head of the labor camp decided to free him. During all his time as a Soviet prisoner, one of Czajkowski's main diversions was to hold a wooden spoon in his hand as though it were a sabre and "practice" fencing - visualizing himself engaged in his favorite activity as a distraction from the hardships of his imprisonment. After being freed from Vorkuta, Czajkowski spent weeks making his way to Uzbekistan, where he stayed for several months working on cotton and rice plantations. Before leaving, he also spent some time coaching fencing. On February 5, 1942, his birthday, Czajkowski rejoined the Polish Navy. He eventually was stationed in Great Britain, at the Polish Naval Station in Plymouth. Soon after D-Day, Czajkowski received leave from the Navy and began studying medicine at the University of Edinburgh in Scotland. He fenced for the Edinburgh University fencing club and the Scottish Fencing Club. He also began to do some amateur coaching for the Polish Students Association in Great Britain. His son was born in Edinburgh 1 December 1945.

== Back in Poland ==
In 1949, Czajkowski returned to Poland, along with his new wife, Wendy Cochrane-Czajkowska. They lived in Kraków, where Czajkowski finished his final year of studies at the very reputable Jagiellonian University. Less than a year into his career as a doctor, Czajkowski decided to give it up because, as he put it, "Being a doctor is very depressing. You're always surrounded by sick people." He decided to, instead, become a full-time fencing coach.

In 1950, Czajkowski became the first post-war Polish National Champion in foil. He also represented Poland many times as a member of its national team - particularly achieving success in sabre, his favorite weapon. His best competitive result came at the 1953 World Championships in Brussels, where Czajkowski won a bronze medal in the team sabre event.

== Coaching success ==
In 1964 Czajkowski's student, Egon Franke became the first Pole to ever earn an Olympic gold medal in fencing when he won the individual men's foil title. Czajkowski spent many years as Poland's top coach, creating dozens of national, European, World, and Olympic medalists in all three weapons. His international success continued into his 70s when, in 1996, his student Magdalena Jeziorowska became European Women's Epee Champion.

Some of Czajkowski's notable students include:

- Bogdan Gonsior - 1963 World Championship Bronze medalist in épée
- Egon Franke - 1964 Olympic Champion in foil
- Elżbieta Cymerman - nine-time Polish national champion in women's foil, silver medalist at the World University Games, gold medalist at the Socialist Countries Championships
- Jacek Bierkowski - 1975 World Championship Silver medalist in sabre
- Magdalena Jeziorowska - 1996 European Champion in women's épée

== Academic career ==
Since 1980, Czajkowski has been director of the Fencing Department at the Academy of Physical Education in Katowice where he has educated over one hundred fencing masters, including Edward Korfanty, Artur Wasiolka, Pawel Mancewicz, Michael Marx and Andrzej Gottner. Along with his medical degree, Czajkowski has a PhD in Physical Education and many honorary degrees. Czajkowski has written hundreds of published articles on fencing and its training, and thirty books including Understanding Fencing - The Unity of Theory and Practice, which was published in 2005 in the United States.
