= Barbara Turpin =

American atmospheric scientist

Barbara Jo Turpin
- Education: California Institute of Technology; OGI School of Science and Engineering
- Scientific career
- Workplaces: Rutgers University; University of North Carolina at Chapel Hill
- Thesis: Secondary formation of organic aerosol: investigation of the diurnal variations of organic and elemental carbon (1990)

Barbara Jo Turpin is an American chemist who is a Professor of Atmospheric Chemistry at the University of North Carolina at Chapel Hill. Her research considers aerosol science and environmental engineering. Turpin studies the formation of organic particulate matter via aqueous chemistry. She was awarded the 2018 American Chemical Society Award for Creative Advances in Environmental Science and Technology. Turpin is a Fellow of the American Association for Aerosol Research, American Geophysical Union and American Association for the Advancement of Science.

== Early life and education ==
Turpin earned her bachelor's degree in engineering at the California Institute of Technology. She was a member of Dabney House. She completed her undergraduate research on air pollution. She was a doctoral student at the OGI School of Science and Engineering, where she studied the secondary formation of organic aerosols. Turpin moved to the University of Minnesota as a postdoctoral research associate, working on particle characterization. As a young woman she was a champion epeeist, and member of the United States Fencing Team. She was a National Champion in 1992.

== Research and career ==
In 1994, Turpin was appointed to the faculty at Rutgers University, where she was promoted to full professor in 2005. She moved to the University of North Carolina at Chapel Hill in 2015, where she was promoted to Chair of the Department of Environmental Sciences and Engineering the following year.

Turpin's research has considered organic particulate matter and the impact of airborne particles on human health. She was a member of the United States Environmental Protection Agency Particulate Matter Review Panel. The panel, which, under the Clean Air Act, is required to review air pollutants and their impact on human health, was disbanded by Trump in 2018.

In 2018, Turpin was honored by the American Chemical Society for her Creative Advances in Environmental Science and Technology. During the COVID-19 pandemic, Turpin studied the airborne transmissibility of SARS-CoV-2. She gave advice on how to stay safe when dealing with a virus spread by airborne particles.

== Awards and honors ==
- 2009 Haagen Smit Prize
- 2010 American Association for Aerosol Research David Sinclair Award
- 2011 Elected Fellow of the American Association for the Advancement of Science
- 2012 Promoted to President of the American Association for Aerosol Research
- 2013 Elected Fellow of the American Geophysical Union
- 2014 Elected Fellow of the American Association for Aerosol Research
- 2018 American Chemical Society Award for Creative Advances in Environmental Science and Technology for “revealing the importance of aqueous-phase chemistry in the formation of atmospheric secondary organic aerosol,”.

== Selected publications ==
- Turpin, Barbara J.; Lim, Ho-Jin (2001). "Species Contributions to PM2.5 Mass Concentrations: Revisiting Common Assumptions for Estimating Organic Mass". Aerosol Science and Technology. 35 (1): 602–610. Bibcode:2001AerST..35..602T. doi:10.1080/02786820119445. ISSN 0278-6826.
- Turpin, Barbara J.; Saxena, Pradeep; Andrews, Elisabeth (2000). "Measuring and simulating particulate organics in the atmosphere: problems and prospects". Atmospheric Environment. 34 (18): 2983–3013. Bibcode:2000AtmEn..34.2983T. doi:10.1016/s1352-2310(99)00501-4. ISSN 1352-2310.
- Ervens, B.; Turpin, B. J.; Weber, R. J. (2011-08-08). "Secondary organic aerosol formation in cloud droplets and aqueous particles (aqSOA): a review of laboratory, field and model studies". doi:10.5194/acpd-11-22301-2011.

== See also ==
- List of USFA Division I National Champions
