= U.S. Center for SafeSport =

Organization reviewing sexual abuse in sport

United States Center for SafeSport
- Nickname: SafeSport
- Formation: March 2017 (9 years ago)
- Type: 501(c)(3) organization
- Purpose: Addressing sexual abuse of minors and amateur athletes in the U.S. in Olympic sports.
- Location: Denver, Colorado, U.S.
- Origins: Established under the Protecting Young Victims from Sexual Abuse and Safe Sport Authorization Act of 2017
- Region served: United States
- Services: Assess sexual abuse and sexual misconduct complaints; impose sanctions, up to lifetime bans; provide public central database of disciplinary cases
- Chief Executive Officer: April Holmes (interim)
- Board of directors: 12 independent board members
- Budget: $21 million (2023)
- Funding: US Olympic & Paralympic Committee, national governing bodies, a federal grant, etc.
- Staff: 117 (2023)
- Volunteers: 3 (2020)
- Website: uscenterforsafesport.org

The United States Center for SafeSport is an American 501(c)(3) nonprofit organization set up to reduce sexual abuse of minors and athletes in Olympic sports in the United States.

Established in 2017 under the Protecting Young Victims from Sexual Abuse and Safe Sport Authorization Act, SafeSport has exclusive jurisdiction to review allegations of sexual abuse and misconduct within U.S. Olympic or Paralympic organizations. The Center may also review and act upon other allegations, such as emotional abuse, bullying, and harassment. It cannot indict or jail people accused of sexual misconduct, as it is neither a law enforcement agency nor a legal body of the U.S. judiciary; but it can impose sanctions up to a lifetime ban of a person from involvement in Olympic sports. It can also forward its investigations to state and federal courts for due process and collaborate with law enforcement on investigations. It also maintains a public database of sanctioned people.

As of October 2021, the Center had sanctioned 1,100 people. In May 2023, SafeSport reported that it was receiving 150 reports per week, or about 8,000 per year, and had an annual budget of $21 million and a staff of 117 people.

== Sexual misconduct investigations ==
=== Responsibilities and operations ===
SafeSport's primary responsibility, as to which it has exclusive jurisdiction in the United States, is to review allegations of sexual misconduct within U.S. Olympic or Paralympic organizations, and to impose sanctions up to lifetime banning of a person from involvement in all Olympic sports. In the case of sexual abuse or sexual misconduct, the Center's exclusive jurisdiction means that individual Olympic and Paralympic organizations must accept its authority in investigating all allegations to the fullest extent of the law. There are no statute of limitations. Reporting to SafeSport, both online and by telephone, is key to its mission.

Upon receiving a report, Center staff considers the number of individuals who allege that they have experienced misconduct, whether they were minors, the number of witnesses, and the volume of and difficulty in obtaining evidence. The severity of abuse and misconduct can range from inappropriate conduct (such as butt slapping), to rape and forcible sexual assault. On a discretionary basis, SafeSport also reviews and acts on allegations other than those of sexual abuse or sexual misconduct, such as emotional abuse, bullying, and harassment. SafeSport collaborates with law enforcement on reported investigations.

=== Database ===
SafeSport maintains a public list of people under sanction who are believed to threaten U.S. Olympic and Paralympic athletes and affiliated organizations. Each name is removed after a sanction has run its course, often leaving no public record of the allegation and sanction. SafeSport does not generally reveal the nature and severity of the alleged misconduct, the evidence gathered by investigators, and whatever aggravating or mitigating factors might have influenced an arbitrator's decision on appeal. Center officials say that to "maintain its legitimacy in [the] community, the center needs to be perceived as fair: tenacious in protecting young athletes while providing due process to those who face reputation-ruining allegations that might prevent them from competing or coaching." SafeSport defends its confidentiality policy, "which prohibits the sharing of documents related to a case, as designed to protect the privacy of everyone involved, including victims and witnesses."

The 2020 U.S. government report said:

"...according to Center staff, as of June 30, 2020, approximately 1,300 individuals were listed in the CDD. The directory includes the names of individuals subject to temporary measures because of the severity of allegations against them, as well as individuals sanctioned with some period of suspension or ineligibility. The Center does not publish the names of every individual sanctioned for violating the SafeSport Code. For example, the Center does not publish the names of minors or individuals whose sanctions do not materially limit their ability to participate in sports. According to the Center, an arbitration hearing may overturn the Center's findings or sanctions when the arbitrator finds insufficient evidence to support violation or sanction. Substantially modified decisions are those where the arbitrator issues a decision and sanction of a different type than the Center issued or reduces the Center's sanction by 50 percent or more."

=== Education ===
The Center provides education to U.S. Olympic and Paralympic organizations and sells anti-abuse training to other groups.

=== Funding ===
In 2019, its second year of operation, Center had a budget of $10.5 million. CEO Shellie Pfohl resigned that year, saying that the Center lacked the resources to deal with the more than 1,800 reports of sexual misconduct or sexual abuse that had "inundated" the organization.

The next year, its funding was increased to $23 million under proposals by U.S. Senators Richard Blumenthal and Jerry Moran. The situation started to improve in latter years, as the federal government stepped in. In October 2020, the Center had about 1,200 open investigations, and about half of its staff were devoted to clearing the backlog; by October 2021, it had resolved 40% of its backlog.

Launched in 2017 with just three full-time employees to investigate thousands of complaints, which were filed without any statute of limitations, the Center in 2020 had 91 employees, 57 contractors, 13 outside counsel, and 3 interns. As of 2021, the organization had more than 100 employees, has gotten through 40% of its backlog, and had sanctioned 1,100 people.

As of May 2023, SafeSport reported that it was receiving 150 reports per week, or about 8,000 per year, and had an annual budget of $21 million and a staff of 117 people.

== Cases and outcomes ==
Sexual misconduct claims in U.S. Olympic & Paralympic sports rose 55% between 2018 and 2019. In that latter year, the Center received 2,770 reports of sexual abuse, bringing the total since its establishment to more than 4,000 reports. By February 2020, the total was almost 5,000 reports; the Center had sanctioned 627 people.

In 2020, the Pulitzer Center reported that "it is unclear in particular public informational materials, such as congressional testimony, how many of those individuals were banned for sexual abuse and how many were banned for other infractions of the Code, such as bullying or hazing. However, it is possible to see specific reasons for bans on the national database."

By October 2021, SafeSport had sanctioned 1,100 people.

=== Temporary measures ===
From July 1, 2019, through June 30, 2020, the Center imposed temporary measures in 123 of 2,027 cases that were created (6%); in all the other cases the measures imposed are final and cannot be appealed. The Center imposes temporary measures only when it believes that they are necessary, based on the evidentiary support for the allegations, the severity of the allegations, and/or the perceived risk to athletes or the sport community.

==== Appeals ====
The Center guarantees appeal hearings on temporary suspensions within 72 hours, if requested by the Respondent. At the hearing before the arbitrator, the Respondent who has been sanctioned, usually with their attorney, argues to have their punishment reduced or revoked. The Arbitrator considers the reasonableness of the suspension based on the evidence and the seriousness of the allegations. The Arbitrator's decision is issued within 24 hours of the hearing's end, and is not subject to appeal.

At a temporary measures hearing, the Arbitrator does not resolve whether the Respondent committed a violation, or what the appropriate sanctions should be if a violation is found. It is not a hearing on the merits. The hearing is strictly limited to determining if there was reasonable cause to impose the temporary measures. If an Arbitrator modifies or denies temporary measures, the Center nevertheless can again impose temporary measures in the same case in the future. In addition, the Arbitrator's decision is inadmissible, and is not given any weight, if there is a subsequent final decision with sanctions imposed, which in turn goes to arbitration.

=== Cases ===
The Center refers to an allegation of misconduct as a "case" when the Center has what it deems to be enough information to launch an investigation.

According to the December 2020 United States Government Accountability Office report, "from July 1, 2019, through June 30, 2020, the Center created 2,027 cases, but only 1,223 included claimant information. According to Center staff, oftentimes when third parties make a report, claimants are unwilling to participate in cases, and the Center is unable to record claimant data. Additionally, cases often involve multiple allegations against the same individual, which is why the number of total claimants exceeds the number of cases with claimant data." The report further states that "From February 2018, through June 2020, the Center created and resolved 3,909 cases. Most cases (63 percent) were resolved in 1 to 3 months, although 536 cases (14 percent) took over a year to resolve. According to Center staff, the length of time to resolve cases depends on the circumstances of the case, such as law enforcement involvement or reluctant or nonresponsive claimants." In 424 cases, the Center referred reports of alleged abuse to law enforcement. The report also explains that "the Center may reassess its jurisdictional decision at any time. If the Center declines to exercise jurisdiction over a matter in its discretionary jurisdiction, the Center may refer the matter to the appropriate sport’s national governing body."

The 2022 Yates Report by former US Attorney General Sally Yates, which was commissioned by the United States Soccer Federation (USSF) in response to the 2021 NWSL abuse scandal, states that "according to a December 2020 SafeSport report, it investigated 1,509 claims from July 1, 2019 to June 30, 2020. Of those claims, it administratively closed 515 cases, put 115 cases on administrative hold, and closed 720 claims based on jurisdiction." According to the December 2020 U.S. Government Accountability Office report, the Center imposed sanctions in 262 cases during that period; in 71% consisting of some level of suspension or ineligibility. In 95 cases, "ineligibility until further notice" was the highest sanction imposed by the Center. In 57 cases, "permanent ineligibility" was the highest sanction imposed by the Center. In 33 cases, the sanction was "suspension for a specified period of time," in 58 cases it was probation, while in 19 cases it was a warning. SafeSport explains that for the purpose of "maintain[ing] its legitimacy in [the] community, the center needs to be perceived as fair: tenacious in protecting young athletes while providing due process to those who face reputation-ruining allegations that might prevent them from competing or coaching." The Center cannot indict or jail individuals accused of sexual misconduct, as it is neither a law enforcement agency nor a legal body of the U.S. judiciary, instead being a sports investigative body; however, it can forward its investigations to state and federal courts, which in turn can impose criminal penalties on the defendants.

The aforementioned report states that "from February 2018, through June 2020, the Center created and resolved 3,909 cases. Most cases (63 percent) were resolved in 1 to 3 months, although 536 cases (14 percent) took over a year to resolve. According to Center staff, the length of time to resolve cases depends on the circumstances of the case, such as law enforcement involvement or reluctant or nonresponsive claimants."

SafeSport's 2022 annual report stated that since it was created in March 2017, it had used administrative closures in 4,500 out of 12,751 cases, and found violations in 1,720.

==== Merits arbitration appeals ====
According to the December 2020 U.S. government report, "from July 1, 2019, through June 30, 2020, 27 cases were referred to arbitration. Of the 27 cases referred to arbitration, six cases were referred to Temporary Measures Hearings, and the remaining 21 were referred to Merits Arbitration. Of the 21 cases referred to Merits Arbitration, 11 cases resulted in the Center’s findings and sanctions being substantially upheld, three cases resulted in the Center’s findings and sanctions being substantially modified, three cases resulted in the Center’s findings and sanctions being overturned, and four cases were in progress as of late August 2020. The Center publishes the names of sanctioned adults who the Center believes pose a potential risk to U.S. Olympic and Paralympic athletes and affiliated organizations in its online Centralized Disciplinary Database (CDD). According to Center staff, as of June 30, 2020, approximately 1,300 individuals were listed in the CDD. The directory includes the names of individuals subject to temporary measures because of the severity of allegations against them, as well as individuals sanctioned with some period of suspension or ineligibility. The Center does not publish the names of every individual sanctioned for violating the SafeSport Code. For example, the Center does not publish the names of minors or individuals whose sanctions do not materially limit their ability to participate in sports. According to the Center, an arbitration hearing may overturn the Center's findings or sanctions when the arbitrator finds insufficient evidence to support violation or sanction. Substantially modified decisions are those where the arbitrator issues a decision and sanction of a different type than the Center issued or reduces the Center's sanction by 50 percent or more.

== Criticism ==
SafeSport has been criticized for not being sufficiently independent from the United States Olympic & Paralympic Committee (USOPC), from which it receives most of its funding. The U.S. Empowering Olympic, Paralympic, and Amateur Athletes Act of 2020 was passed to grant Congress the power to dissolve the USOPC Board of Directors.

In 2020, SafeSport temporarily suspended Paralympic swimmer Robert Griswold for alleged misconduct, but he was reinstated on appeal one month later. Another Paralympic swimmer, Parker Egbert, who has the mental capacity of a 5-year-old, alleged that subsequent to Griswold's reinstatement, Griswold violently and repeatedly raped him, including in the room the two athletes shared at the Paralympic Games in 2021. Egbert filed a lawsuit against Griswold, SafeSport, and USOPC.

At a 2021 hearing before the US Senate Judiciary Committee, American Olympic gold medal gymnast Aly Raisman said: "I don't like SafeSport ... it's a complete mess, and the priority doesn't seem to be the safety and well-being of athletes."

In 2021, New York State Senator Brad Hoylman wrote a letter to U.S. Senator Maria Cantwell, requesting that the Senate Committee on Commerce, Science, and Transportation oversee SafeSport to ensure that it is adequately conducting investigations. He highlighted that despite serious outstanding allegations of sexual misconduct, coercion, and other violent behaviors, fencer Alen Hadzic was allowed to travel to the Tokyo Olympics as an alternate, although he was forced to stay separately from the other U.S. fencing team members. In 2022, USA Fencing stated, "we had hoped for a swifter resolution to this investigation, which has now stretched on for more than a year. We share in the frustration of fencers and fencing fans. The U.S. Center for SafeSport has the exclusive authority to adjudicate reports of alleged sexual abuse and sexual misconduct. As long as the outcome of this investigation remains unresolved, USA Fencing is obligated to allow Hadzic to compete internationally." Hadzic was permanently banned in 2023.

In February 2022, in an ABC News' Nightline program, Senator Richard Blumenthal said, "there is simply no way that SafeSport can be given a passing grade" and "these young athletes deserve better protection." Senator Jerry Moran echoed the sentiment, stating that every athlete-victim he visited "had little or no confidence in SafeSport." The Senators said that more transparency is required from SafeSport, which does not make public its investigative findings or arbitration decisions. Academics, athletes, and activists have also criticized SafeSport for lack of transparency. SafeSport defends its confidentiality policy, "which prohibits the sharing of documents related to a case, as designed to protect the privacy of everyone involved, including victims and witnesses."

Nancy Hogshead-Makar, an American Olympic gold medalist swimmer and attorney, described SafeSport as "defendant-friendly." Attorney Jack Wiener, who represented three claimants in the SafeSport matter of Alen Hadzic, alleged that "SafeSport's system is rigged. It tilts overwhelmingly against victims of sexual assault." USA Today published emails between Wiener and a SafeSport investigator in which Wiener suggested SafeSport had not followed up with his clients in two years. A SafeSport spokesperson stated "it is not uncommon for both sides to feel frustration with SafeSport’s procedures. But, even with its flaws, the agency's protections against abuse appear superior to those in most of the other countries, where they do not exist, and the ineffective system operated previously by the United States Olympic and Paralympic Committee and national sports federations."

Regarding the Yates Report commissioned by the United States Soccer Federation (USSF), SafeSport CEO Ju'Riese Cólon told USA Today that she could not comment on the report's numbers because SafeSport was not interviewed for it. However, the report describes interviews with SafeSport representatives. The report includes accusations of abuse against Chicago Red Stars and youth coach Rory Dames, which resulted in Dames being banned for life from the NWSL. USA Today reported that SafeSport's investigation remained open 18 months later and SafeSport required USSF to lift its suspension of Dames and restore his license. SafeSport did not explain its actions, and jurisdiction prohibited USSF from continuing the investigation. Former U.S. Attorney General Sally Yates, who authored the report, suggested that USSF not rely exclusively on SafeSport to investigate claims of abuse, and blamed inaction by multiple governing bodies on the lack of jurisdictional clarity. The report suggested improvements to the appeals process, described as hostile to victims while allowing the accused to be reinstated.

In 2023, 103 current and former U.S. Soccer senior and youth national team players wrote a letter to U.S. Congress calling for reform. They wrote that "the arbitration process can be damaging and retraumatizing," and "if the victim decides not to go through the whole process again on appeal, the decision is automatically overturned, and the perpetrator is free to enter back into the sport. […] Victims cannot appeal a decision that finds their alleged abuser was not culpable. And SafeSport does not turn over records to the victim so that they can be sure that justice was done."

== Sanctioned individuals ==
Notable individuals sanctioned following cases adjudicated by SafeSport:

- Rich Fellers, equestrian. Banned in 2021 for criminal charges of sexual misconduct involving minors.
- Peter Foley, snowboarding coach. Suspended for 10 years in 2023 for sexual misconduct.
- Alen Hadzic, fencer. Permanently banned in 2023 for sexual misconduct.
- Mauro Hamza, Egyptian fencing coach. Permanently banned in 2023 for sexual misconduct involving minors.
- Lars Jorgensen, swimmer and coach. Permanently banned in 2025 for physical misconduct and sexual harassment and misconduct.
- Brendan Kerry, figure skater. Permanently banned in 2024 for sexual misconduct involving a minor.
- Ivan Lee, fencer and coach. Banned in 2025 for criminal charges of sexual misconduct.
- Teri McKeever, swim coach. Suspended for three months in 2023 for emotional misconduct.
- Ross Miner, figure skater and coach. Suspended for six months in 2021 for sexual harassment.
- George H. Morris, equestrian and coach. Permanently banned in 2019 for sexual misconduct involving minors.
- Larry Nassar, gymnastics doctor. Permanently banned in 2018 for criminal charges involving minors.
- Alberto Salazar, track coach. Permanently banned in 2021 for sexual misconduct.
- Keith Sanderson, sport shooter. Three month suspension in 2021 for sexual harassment and misconduct.
- Angelo Taylor, track and field athlete. Banned in 2019 for 2006 criminal convictions of sexual misconduct involving minors.
- Jordan Windle, diver. Permanently banned in 2024 for sexual misconduct involving minors, emotional misconduct, and inappropriate conduct.

=== Died while under SafeSport investigation ===
- John Coughlin, figure skater. Under investigation and temporarily suspended in 2019. Died by suicide the next day.
- Stephen Kovacs, fencer and coach. Under investigation and temporarily suspended in 2021. Died by suicide in jail in 2022.

== See also ==
- USA Gymnastics sex abuse scandal
- 2021 NWSL abuse scandal
