= Chauncey McPherson =

American fencer

Personal information
- Born: January 29, 1892 Philadelphia, Pennsylvania, United States
- Died: May 4, 1977 (aged 85) Bernardsville, New Jersey, United States

Sport
- Sport: Fencing

Chauncey McPherson (January 29, 1892 – May 4, 1977) was an American fencer. He competed in the individual and team sabre events at the 1924 Summer Olympics.

== See also ==
- List of USFA Division I National Champions
