= Erinn Smart =

American fencer (born 1980)

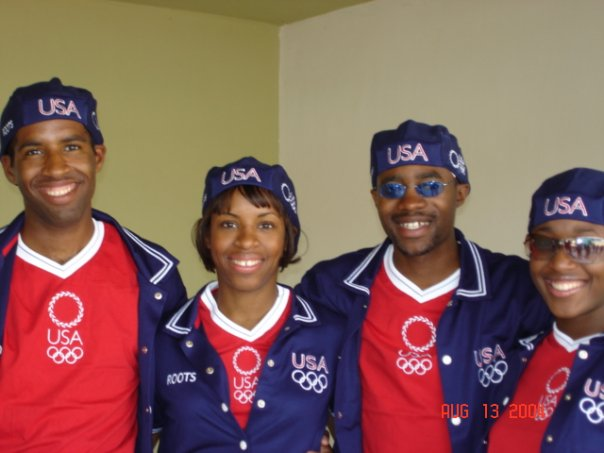
- 2004 Fencing Olympians from Peter Westbrook Foundation, Keeth Smart, Erinn Smart, Ivan Lee, and Kamara James (l-r)

Personal information
- Born: January 12, 1980 (age 46) Brooklyn, New York, United States

Sport
- Sport: Fencing
Medal record
Women's fencing
Representing United States
Olympic Games
Silver medal – second place	2008 Beijing	Foil Team

Erinn Smart (born January 12, 1980) is an American foil fencer who was a member of the United States fencing team at the 2008 Summer Olympics in Beijing, where she competed in the women's individual and team foil events. Smart is 5 feet 7 inches (1.70 m), weighs 125 pounds (57 kg), and is coached by Buckie Leach. Smart's brother Keeth is also a nationally ranked competitive fencer who also started fencing with the Peter Westbrook Foundation.

== Early life and education ==
Smart was born in New York City, New York, and lived on Ocean Avenue in Brooklyn. Before taking up fencing, she had taken ballet, ice skating, tennis and track. After her father, an employee at Sports Illustrated, learned about a program aimed at encouraging minority participation in fencing, she began to take up the sport at age 11 at the Peter Westbrook Foundation, whose founder, Olympic saber bronze-medalist Peter Westbrook, has been her mentor. Her brother Keeth, 18 months her senior, took up the sport six months later.

Smart graduated from Brooklyn Technical High School, as a chemistry major, in 1997. She attended Barnard College at Columbia University in Manhattan, graduating in 2001 with a degree in economics. She fenced for the Columbia Lions fencing team. She was recognized as an NCAA All-American at Columbia. She worked for Lord Abbett, a financial firm, following the 2004 Olympics. She earned an MBA from the Wharton School of the University of Pennsylvania in 2013.

== Fencing career ==
Smart was the United States National Champion in 1998, 2002, 2004, 2007, and 2008, and was ranked 11th at the 2003 World Championships. Both Smarts won at the 2004 U.S. Fencing National Championships in Atlanta, Georgia, with Erinn edging Hanna Thompson 13–11 in the semifinals, and then defeating three-time former Olympian Ann Marsh by 15–7 in the tournament final to take the title.

Smart was selected as an alternate for the United States team at the 2000 Summer Olympics in Sydney, Australia, but did not participate in the competition. She outpointed sisters Iris and Felicia Zimmerman to earn a spot on the United States team at the 2004 Summer Olympics in Athens, Greece.

Both Erinn and her brother Keeth were part of the United States team at the 2008 Summer Olympics. Both won silver medals in their team events.

== See also ==
- List of American foil fencers
- List of USFA Division I National Champions
- List of USFA Hall of Fame members
