= Keeth Smart =

American fencer (born 1978)

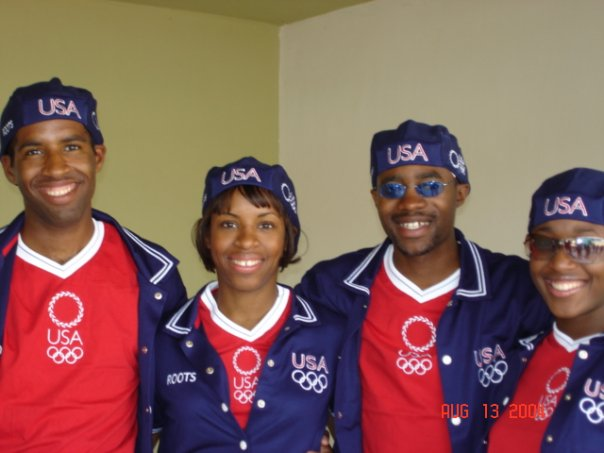
- 2004 Fencing Olympians from Peter Westbrook Foundation, Keeth Smart, Erinn Smart, Ivan Lee, and Kamara James (l-r)

Personal information
- Born: July 29, 1978 (age 48) Brooklyn, New York, United States
- Height: 6 ft (183 cm)
- Weight: 165 lb (75 kg)

Sport
- Sport: Fencing
- Event: saber
- College team: St. John's University
- Club: Manhattan Fencing Club
- Coached by: Yury Gelman
Medal record
Men's fencing
Representing United States
Olympic Games
| Silver medal – second place | 2008 Beijing | Sabre Team |

Keeth Thomas Smart (born July 29, 1978) is an American saber fencer, who was the first American to gain the sport's top ranking for males in saber. A three-time Olympian, he won a silver medal at the 2008 Olympic Games in Beijing in team sabre.

== Early life and education ==
Smart was born in Brooklyn, New York, and grew up in Flatbush, Brooklyn, New York City. His parents were Thomas R. Smart Jr. (a production manager and later an economist) and Liz Smart (a teacher who had come to the United States from Jamaica). At the urging of his parents, he and his younger sister Erinn began to learn fencing at the Peter Westbrook Foundation, whose founder, Olympic sabre bronze-medalist Peter Westbrook, was his mentor.

Smart graduated from Brooklyn Technical High School in 1996. He graduated from St. John's University in New York City in 2001, majoring in finance. He later received his MBA from Columbia University in 2010, and now works as a Senior Vice President for Chelsea Piers Fitness which he had joined in 2017.

== Fencing career ==
Smart's fencing coach was Yury Gelman.

During college, Smart was the NCAA sabre champion in 1997 and 1999, and took second place in 2001.

He was a member of the 1999 Pan American Games bronze medal team.

Smart competed in three Olympic Games in men's saber. He placed 30th in the individual competition in the 2000 Olympic Games. He then placed 15th in the individual competition and 4th in the team competition at the 2004 Olympic Games.

He placed 6th in the individual competition at the 2008 Olympic Games, defeating eventual three-time individual Olympic champion Áron Szilágyi along the way, and won a silver medal in the 2008 team event. In the saber team semi-finals the United States had been losing to Russia 40–35, before Smart outscored Russian Stanislav Pozdnyakov 10–4 for the win, with Team USA beating the Russians 45–44, allowing the Americans to go on to win the silver medal. It was the first Olympic medal for the US men's saber team since 1948.

His sister Erinn also earned a silver medal as part of the US women's foil team at the 2008 Olympics.

In 2002 and 2004, Smart won the US national sabre championship. In 2003, he became the first American to be named the top-ranked fencer internationally.

== Personal life ==
Keeth married Shyra (Cooper) Smart on May 27, 2007 in Chapel Hill, North Carolina. They live in Brooklyn, New York, with their two children. Keeth and his sister Erinn are actively involved in the Peter Westbrook Foundation in New York City.

== See also ==
- List of American sabre fencers
- List of USFA Division I National Champions
- List of NCAA fencing champions
- List of USFA Hall of Fame members
