= List of USFA Division I National Champions =

This is a list of USA Fencing (USFA) Division I national champions. The Division I National Championship in each weapon was contested at Summer Nationals until recently, when it started taking place during the April North American Cup.

== Men's Fencing Division I National Champions ==
Men's Fencing Division I National Champions
Year	Épée	Foil	Sabre
2026	Nathaniel Wimmer	Chase Emmer	Elden Wood
2025	Michael Bezrodnov	Nick Itkin	Darii Lukashenko
2024	Noah Silvers	Samarth Kumbla	Grant Williams
2023	Samuel Imrek	Nick Itkin	Grant Williams
2022	Tristan Szapary	Nick Itkin	Eli Dershwitz
2021	Matthew Comes	Nick Itkin	Khalil Thompson
2020	No National Championship held due to the Coronavirus		
2019	Jake Hoyle	Adam Mathieu	Mitchell Saron
2018	Dennis Kraft	Nick Itkin	Daryl Homer
2017	Ben Bratton	Nick Itkin	Daryl Homer
2016	Jack Bradford	Thomas Dudey	Jeff Spear
2015	Jason Pryor	Sam Moelis	Jeff Spear
2014	Yeisser Ramirez	Race Imboden	Eli Dershwitz
2013	Alexander Tsinis	Miles Chamley-Watson	Aleksander Ochocki
2012	Alexander Tsinis	Gerek Meinhardt	James Williams
2011	Soren Thompson	Race Imboden	Timothy Morehouse
2010	W. Seth Kelsey	Alexander Massialas	Timothy Morehouse
2009	Benjamin Ungar	David Willette	Bryan Cheney
2008	W. Seth Kelsey	Gerek Meinhardt	Ivan Lee
2007	Cody M. Mattern	Gerek Meinhardt	Timothy Hagamen
2006	W. Seth Kelsey	Andras Horanyi	Ivan Lee
2005	Benjamin J. Solomon	Jed Dupree	Ivan Lee
2004	Cody M. Mattern	Dan Kellner	Keeth Smart
2003	John A. Moreau	Jon Tiomkin	Ivan Lee
2002	W. Seth Kelsey	Jed Dupree	Keeth Smart
2001	Eric J. Hansen	Sean McClain	Ivan Lee
2000	Chris O'Loughlin	Cliff Bayer	Akhnaten Spencer-El
1999	Tamir Bloom	Jon Tiomkin	Akhnaten Spencer-El
1998	Tamir Bloom	Cliff Bayer	Patrick Durkan
1997	Jon Normile	Cliff Bayer	Terrence Lasker
1996	Ben Atkins	Eric Oliver Bravin	Adam Skarbonkiewicz
1995	Robert Ernest Stull	Cliff Bayer	Peter Westbrook
1994	Sean McClain	Eric Oliver Bravin	John Friedberg
1993	Ben Atkins	Michael Anthony Marx	David Mandel
1992	Robert Ernest Stull	Eric Oliver Bravin	Michael Lofton
1991	Jon Normile	Eric Oliver Bravin	Michael Lofton
1990	Robert Ernest Stull	Michael Anthony Marx	Robert Cottingham
1989	Robert Ernest Stull	Peter Bramwell Henry Lewison	Peter Westbrook
1988	Jon Normile	Gregory David Massialas	Peter Westbrook
1987	Timothy Carrigan Glass	Michael Anthony Marx	Steve Mormando
1986	Charles Lee Shelley	Michael Anthony Marx	Peter Westbrook
1985	Robert Gabriel Marx	Michael Anthony Marx	Peter Westbrook
1984	Paul Soter	Michael J. W. McCahey	Peter Westbrook
1983	Paul Karoly Pesthy	Mark Jeffrey Troy Smith	Peter Westbrook
1982	Charles Lee Shelley	Michael Anthony Marx	Peter Westbrook
1981	Charles Lee Shelley	Mark Jeffrey Troy Smith	Peter Westbrook
1980	Leonid Dervbinsky	Gregory David Massialas	Peter Westbrook
1979	Timothy Carrigan Glass	Michael Anthony Marx	Peter Westbrook
1978	Brooke Adrian Makler	Martin Lang	Stanley Lekach
1977	Leonid Dervbinsky	Michael Anthony Marx	Thomas Losonczy
1976	George Gabriel Masin	Lieutenant Edward Joseph Donofrio	Thomas Losonczy
1975	Edward Scott Bozek	Edward Pennington Ballinger	Peter Westbrook
1974	Daniel James Cantillon	Heik Hambarzumian	Peter Westbrook
1973	Edward Scott Bozek	Edward Pennington Ballinger	Paul Apostol
1972	James Laurence Melcher	Joseph Bertham Freeman	Alex Orban
1971	James Laurence Melcher	Uriah Jones	Alex Orban
1970	Joseph Elliott	Albert Axelrod	Alex Orban
1969	Stephen Jeffrey Netburn	Carl Lewis Borack	Alex Orban
1968	Paul Karoly Pesthy	Heizaburo Okawa	Jack Keane
1967	Paul Karoly Pesthy	Heizaburo Okawa	Alfonso Morales
1966	Paul Karoly Pesthy	Max Geuter	Alfonso Morales
1965	Joseph Elliott	Robert Boyer Russell	Alex Orban
1964	Paul Karoly Pesthy	Herbert Morris Cohen	Attila Keresztes
1963	Lawrence Joseph Anastasi	Edwin Allen Richards	Eugene Hamori
1962	Gilbert Eisner	Edwin Allen Richards	Michael D'Asaro
1961	Dr. Robert Lee Beck	Lawrence Joseph Anastasi	Dániel Magay
1960	David Micahnik	Albert Axelrod	Eugene Hamori
1959	Henry Kolowrat	Ensign Joseph Paletta Jr.	Thomas Orley
1958	Richard Berry	Albert Axelrod	Daniel Magay
1957	Richard Berry	Dr. Daniel Bukantz	Daniel Magay
1956	Abram Cohen	Sewall Shurtz	Tibor Nyilas
1955	Abram Cohen	Albert Axelrod	Dick Dyer
1954	Sewall Shurtz	Joseph Louis Levis	George Worth
1953	Donald Thompson	Dr. Daniel Bukantz	Tibor Nyilas
1952	Abelardo Menendez	Dr. Daniel Bukantz	Tibor Nyilas
1951	José Raoul de Capriles	Silvio Louis Giolito	Tibor Nyilas
1950	Norman Lewis	Silvio Louis Giolito	Tibor Nyilas
1949	Norman Lewis	Dr. Daniel Bukantz	Umberto De Martino
1948	Norman Lewis	Bennet Nathaniel Lubell	Dean Cetrulo
1947	James Strauch	Dean Victor Cetrulo	James Flynn
1946	Albert Wolff	Jose Raoul deCapriles	Tibor Nyilas
1945	Max Gilman	Dernell Every	Norman Armitage
1944	Miguel Angel deCapriles	Alfred Rex Snyder	Tibor Nyilas
1943	Robert Driscoll	Warren Alvin Dow	Norman Armitage
1942	Henrique Santos	Warren Alvin Dow	Norman Armitage
1941	Gustave Marinius Heiss	Dean Victor Cetrulo	Norman Armitage
1941 (OUT)	Jose Raoul deCapriles		Miguel de Capriles
1940	Fred Siebert	Dernell Every	Norman Armitage
1940 (OUT)	Gustave Marinius Heiss		Norman Armitage
1939	Loyal Tingley	Norman Lewis	Norman Armitage
1939 (OUT)	Tracy Jaeckel		Norman Armitage
1938	Jose Raoul deCapriles	Dernell Every	Johnny Huffman
1938 (OUT)	Miguel Angel deCapriles		Johnny Huffman
1937	Thomas J. Sands	Joseph Louis Levis	Johnny Huffman
1937 (OUT)	Jose Raoul deCapriles		Irving Cantor
1936	Gustave Marinius Heiss	Hugh Vincent Alessandroni	Norman Armitage
1936 (OUT)	Miguel Angel deCapriles		Johnny Huffman
1935	Thomas J. Sands	Joseph Louis Levis	Norman Armitage
1935 (OUT)	Jose Raoul deCapriles		Norman Armitage
1934	Gustave Marinius Heiss	Hugh Vincent Alessandroni	Norman Armitage
1934 (OUT)	Douglas Dexter		Johnny Huffman
1933	Gustave Marinius Heiss	Joseph Louis Levia	Johnny Huffman
1933 (OUT)	Frank Stahl Righeimer III	Joseph Louis Levis	Norman Armitage
1932	Leo George Nunes	Joseph Louis Levis	Johnny Huffman
1932 (OUT)	Gustave Marinius Heiss		Norman Armitage
1931	Miguel Angel deCapriles	Lieutenant George Charles Calnan	Johnny Huffman
1931 (OUT)	Lieutenant George Charles Calnan		Peter Bruder
1930	Marcel Pasche	Lieutenant George Charles Calnan	Norman Armitage
1930 (OUT)	Robert E. Futch		Norman Armitage
1929	Frank Stahl Righeimer III	Joseph Louis Levis	Leo Nunes
1929 (OUT)	Frank Stahl Righeimer III	Joseph Louis Levis	Norman Armitage
1928	Leo George Nunes	Lieutenant George Charles Calnan	Nickolas Muray
1928 (OUT)	Frank Goodfellow		Leo Nunes
1927	Harold Van Buskirk	Lieutenant George Charles Calnan	Nickolas Muray
1927 (OUT)	Pieter Mijer		Harold Van Buskirk
1926	Leo George Nunes	Lieutenant George Charles Calnan	Leo Nunes
1926 (OUT)	Alfred Percy Walker Jr.		
1925	William Hamilton Russell	Lieutenant George Charles Calnan	Joseph Vince
1925 (OUT)	Leo George Nunes		
1924	Leo George Nunes	Leo George Nunes	John Gignoux
1924 (OUT)	Henry Breckinridge		
1923	Lt. George C. Calnan	Rene Peroy	Leon Schoonmaker
1923 (OUT)	Curtis C. Shears		
1922	Leo George Nunes	Major Harold Marvin Rayner	Leo Nunes
1922 (OUT)	Albert Strauss		
1921	Chauncey Ryder McPherson	Major Francis Webster Honeycutt	Chauncey McPherson
1921 (OUT)	Leo George Nunes		
1920	Raymond W. Dutcher	Sherman Hall	Sherman Hall
1920 (OUT)	John William Dimond		
1919	William Hamilton Russell	Sherman Hall	Arthur Lyon
1918	No National Championship held due to the First World War		
1917	Leo George Nunes	Sherman Hall	Arthur Lyon
1916	William Hamilton Russell	Alfred Ernest Sauer	Sherman Hall
1915	John A. MacLaughlin	Oliver A. Dickinson	Sherman Hall
1914	Dr. Frederick W. Allen	Scott Dudley Breckenridge	Hubert Van Blijenburgh
1913	Alfred Ernest Sauer	Paul Julien Meylan	August Anderson
1912	Albertson Van Zo Post	Sherman Hall	Charles Bill
1911	George Horace Breed	George Horace Breed	August Anderson
1910	A. W. De La Poer	George K. Bainbridge	Joseph Shaw
1909	A. W. De La Poer	Oliver A. Dickinson	Alfred Sauer
1908	Paul Benzenberg	William Law Bowman	George Postgate
1907	W. D. Lyon	Camille Waldbott	August Anderson
1906	William Grebe	Scott Dudley Breckenridge	August Anderson
1905	William Scott O'Connor	Charles George Bothner	Kirk Johnson
1904	Charles George Bothner	Charles George Bothner	August Anderson
1903	Charles Tatham	Fitzhugh Townsend	Albertson Van Zo Post
1902	Charles Tatham	James P. Parker	Albertson Van Zo Post
1901	Charles Tatham	Charles Tatham	Albertson Van Zo Post
1900	W. D. Lyon	Fitzhugh Townsend	John Erving
1899	Manuel De Diaz	Georges Kavanagh	Georges Kavanagh
1898	No National Championship held due to the Spanish-American War		
1897	Charles George Bothner	Charles George Bothner	Charles Bothner
1896	Albertson Van Zo Post	Georges Kavahagh	Charles Bothner
1895	Charles George Bothner	Albertson Van Zo Post	Charles Bothner
1894	Rudolph O. Haubold	Charles George Bothner	Graeme Hammond
1893	Graeme Monroe Hammond	William T. Heintz	Graeme Hammond
1892	Bernard Francis O'Connor	William Scott O'Connor	Rudolph Haubold
1891	Graeme Monroe Hammond	Graeme Monroe Hammond	Charles Bothner
1890	Alexander Greger	Samuel T. Shaw	George Heintz
1889	Graeme Monroe Hammond	Bernard Francis O'Connor	Luis Franke
1888	Eugene Higgins	William Thornton Lawson	Hildreth Bloodgood

== Women's Fencing Division I National Champions ==
Women's Fencing Division I National Champions
Year	Épée	Foil	Sabre
2026	Tierna Oxenreider	Jaelyn Liu	Magda Skarbonkiewicz
2025	Catherine Nixon	Josephina Conway	Chloe Fox-Gitomer
2024	Hadley Husisian	Delphine Devore	Maia Chamberlain
2023	Hadley Husisian	Maia Weintraub	Nora Burke
2022	Catherine Nixon	Lauren Scruggs	Zoe Kim
2021	Hadley Husisian	May Tieu	Chloe Fox-Gitomer
2020	No National Championship held due to the Coronavirus		
2019	Isis Washington	Maia Weintraub	Mariel Zagunis
2018	Amanda Sirico	Nzingha Prescod	Mariel Zagunis
2017	Kelley Hurley	Margaret Lu	Ibtihaj Muhammad
2016	Francesca Bassa	Margaret Lu	Kamali Thompson
2015	Kelley Hurley	Margaret Lu	Sage Palmedo
2014	Margherita Guzzi Vincenti	Margaret Lu	Celina Merza
2013	Kelley Hurley	Nzingha Prescod	Eliza Stone
2012	Courtney Hurley	Doris Willette	Francesca Russo
2011	Courtney Hurley	Margaret Lu	Daria Schneider
2010	Courtney Hurley	Margaret Lu	Emily Jacobson
2009	Susannah Scanlan	Lee Kiefer	Ibtihaj Muhammad
2008	Courtney Hurley	Erinn Smart	Rebecca Ward
2007	Courtney Hurley	Erinn Smart	Rebecca Ward
2006	Kelley Hurley	Emily Cross	Sada Jacobson
2005	Maya Lawrence	Hanna Thompson	Rebecca Ward
2004	Kelley Hurley	Erinn Smart	Sada Jacobson
2003	Stephanie Eim	Iris Zimmermann	Christine Becker
2002	Kerry Walton	Erinn Smart	Caitlin Thompson
2001	Julia Leszko	Iris Zimmermann	Sada Jacobson
2000	Stephanie Eim	Felicia Zimmermann	Christina Crane
1999	Arlene Stevens	Felicia Zimmermann	Nicole Mustilli
1998	Arlene Stevens	Erinn Smart	Kelly Williams
1997	Jessica Burke	Iris Zimmermann	
1996	Leslie Marx	Felicia Zimmermann	
1995	Terry Lewis	Ann Marsh	
1994	Donna Lee Stone	Ann Marsh	
1993	Leslie Marx	Felicia Zimmermann	
1992	Barbara Turpin	Caitlin Kelly Bilodeaux	
1991	Margo Lee Miller	Mary Jane O'Neill	
1990	Donna Lee Stone	Jennifer Yu	
1989	Cathy McClellan	Caitlin Kelly Bilodeaux	
1988	Xandy Brown	Sharon Mary Monplaisir	
1987	Donna Lee Stone	Caitlin Kelly Bilodeaux	
1986	Vincent Hayden Bradford	Caitlin Kelly Bilodeaux	
1985	Cathy McClellan	Molly Sullivan	
1984	Vincent Hayden Bradford	Vincent Hayden Bradford	
1983	Vincent Hayden Bradford	Debra Lynn Waples	
1982	Vincent Hayden Bradford	Jana Angelakis	
1981	Susan Jane Badders	Jana Angelakis	
1980		Nikki Tomlinson Franke	
1979		Jana Angelakis	
1978		Gay Jacobsen D'Asaro	
1977		Sheila Armstrong	
1976		Ann O'Donnell	
1975		Nikki Tomlinson	
1974		Gay Jacobsen	
1973		Tatyana Pavlovna Adamovitch	
1972		Ruth White	
1971		Harriet King	
1970		Harriet King	
1969		Ruth White	
1968		Janice York Romary	
1967		Harriet King	
1966		Janice York Romary	
1965		Janice York Romary	
1964		Janice York Romary	
1963		Harriet King	
1962		E. Takeuchi	
1961		Janice York Romary	
1960		Janice York Romary	
1959		Pilar Roldan	
1958		Maxine Mitchell	
1957		Janice York Romary	
1956		Janice York Romary	
1955		Maxine Mitchell	
1954		Maxine Mitchell	
1953		Paula Sweeney	
1952		Maxine Mitchell	
1951		Janice York (Romary)	
1950		Janice York (Romary)	
1949		Polly Craus	
1948		Helena Mroczkowska Dow	
1947		Helena Mroczkowska Dow	
1946		Helene Mayer	
1945		Maria Cerra	
1944		Madeline Dalton	
1943		Helena Mroczkowska Dow	
1942		Helene Mayer	
1941		Helene Mayer	
1940		Helena Mroczkowska Dow	
1939		Helene Mayer	
1938		Helene Mayer	
1937		Helene Mayer	
1936		Joanna De Tuscan	
1935		Helene Mayer	
1934		Helene Mayer	
1933		Dorothy Locke	
1933 (OUT)		Helene Mayer	
1932		Dorothy Locke	
1931		Marion Lloyd	
1930		Elizabeth Van Buskirk	
1929		Florence Schoonmaker	
1928		Marion Lloyd	
1927		Stephanie Stern	
1926		Florence Schoonmaker	
1925		Florence Schoonmaker	
1924		Irma Hopper	
1923		Adeline Gehrig	
1922		Adeline Gehrig	
1921		Adeline Gehrig	
1920		Adeline Gehrig	
1919		NO CONTEST FOR WOMEN	
1918	No National Championship held due to the First World War		
1917		Florence S. Walton	
1916		Alice Voorhees	
1915		Jessie Pyle	
1914		Margaret Stimson	
1913		Mrs. Wm. H. Dewar	
1912		Dr. Adelaide Baylis	
