= Caity Thompson =

American fencer

Medal record

Representing United States

World Championships
Gold medal – first place	2004 Plovdiv	Cadet Women's Sabre

== Personal ==
Caity Thompson is an American Women's Sabreist from Portland, Oregon. She holds 5 women’s Saber fencing world championships titles, 4 of which are gold. She grew up in Beaverton and graduated from Penn State University.

== History ==
Caity Thompson competed in fencing for fourteen years and was a member of the Oregon Fencing Alliance (OFA) where she trained with Ed Korfanty and Adam Skarbonkiewicz. She is the youngest American National champion in history, claiming her title at 14. Caity had a decorated fencing career including numerous world titles. She claimed her first individual world title In 2004 becoming the under-17 Cadet World Champion. Throughout her career she was a member of several United States World teams including the 2004 Cadet and Junior team, the 2005 Junior and National team and the 2006 Junior and National team. She went on to win 5 World Championship medals, four of which were gold. These titles included the United States first gold medal in Women's Saber team history during the 2005 Senior World Championships in Leipzig, Germany.

== College career ==
Caity Thompson
Medal record

NCAA Championships
Gold medal – first place	2006 Drew University	NCAA Fencing
Gold medal – first place	2009 Penn State University	NCAA Fencing
Gold medal – first place	2010 Harvard University	NCAA Fencing

Caity received the award of "Most Valuable Women's fencer" her freshman year ending the season with a record of 21-4. She was named an All-American in all four years she competed. In 2007, Caity Thompson and Doris Willette led Penn State to win their first NCAA fencing title in 4 years. Caity went 22-2 in the championship meet, with Doris Willette going 23-1. Caity took 2007-2008 year off to train for the 2008 Olympics in Beijing, China. She later returned to Penn State helping them to claim two more National Champion titles.

== See also ==
- List of American sabre fencers
