= Ed Korfanty =

Polish-American fencer and fencing coach (born 1952)

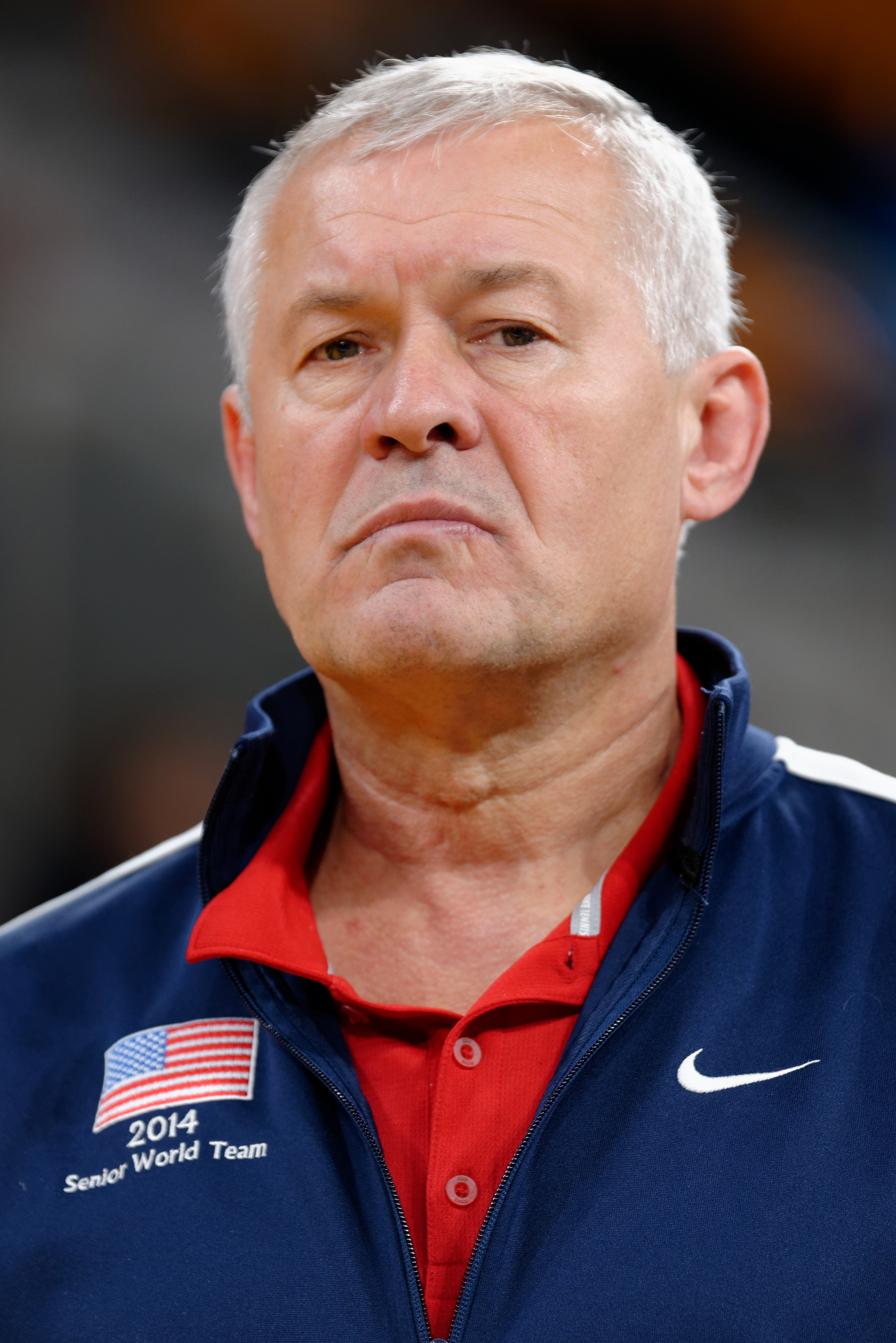
At the 2014–15 Orléans World Cup

Edward Korfanty (born 1952) is a Polish-born American fencing master, U.S. National Women's saber coach, Olympic saber coach, and a former Men's Veterans Saber World Champion.

== Fencing ==
Korfanty was a member of the Polish national fencing team from 1972 to 1984. During his eight years on the Polish national team, he won numerous national and international medals and was a finalist at numerous World Cup and international competitions. He took second place individual three times in the Polish national championships and was team captain of the winning team four times. He was an alternate for one of the Olympic Games, but did not fence.

He became head coach at the Polish Olympic Center in Katowice in 1984. Korfanty moved to the University of Notre Dame in the U.S. in 1990 as assistant fencing coach, and also coached at the Indiana Fencing Academy until 1993. During his tenure at Notre Dame, he coached Canadian fencer Leszek Nowosielski (who was attending Notre Dame) to represent Canada at the 1992 Olympic Games in Barcelona, Spain.

He was appointed the US National Women's saber coach, and coached the first US Women's team (Mariel Zagunis, Christine Becker, Nicole Mustilli, and Sada Jacobson) to win the world championship in 2000. Under Korfanty's direction in 2005, the US women's saber team (Zagunis, Jacobson, Caitlin Thompson, and Rebecca Ward) won the gold medal at the world championships for the second time.

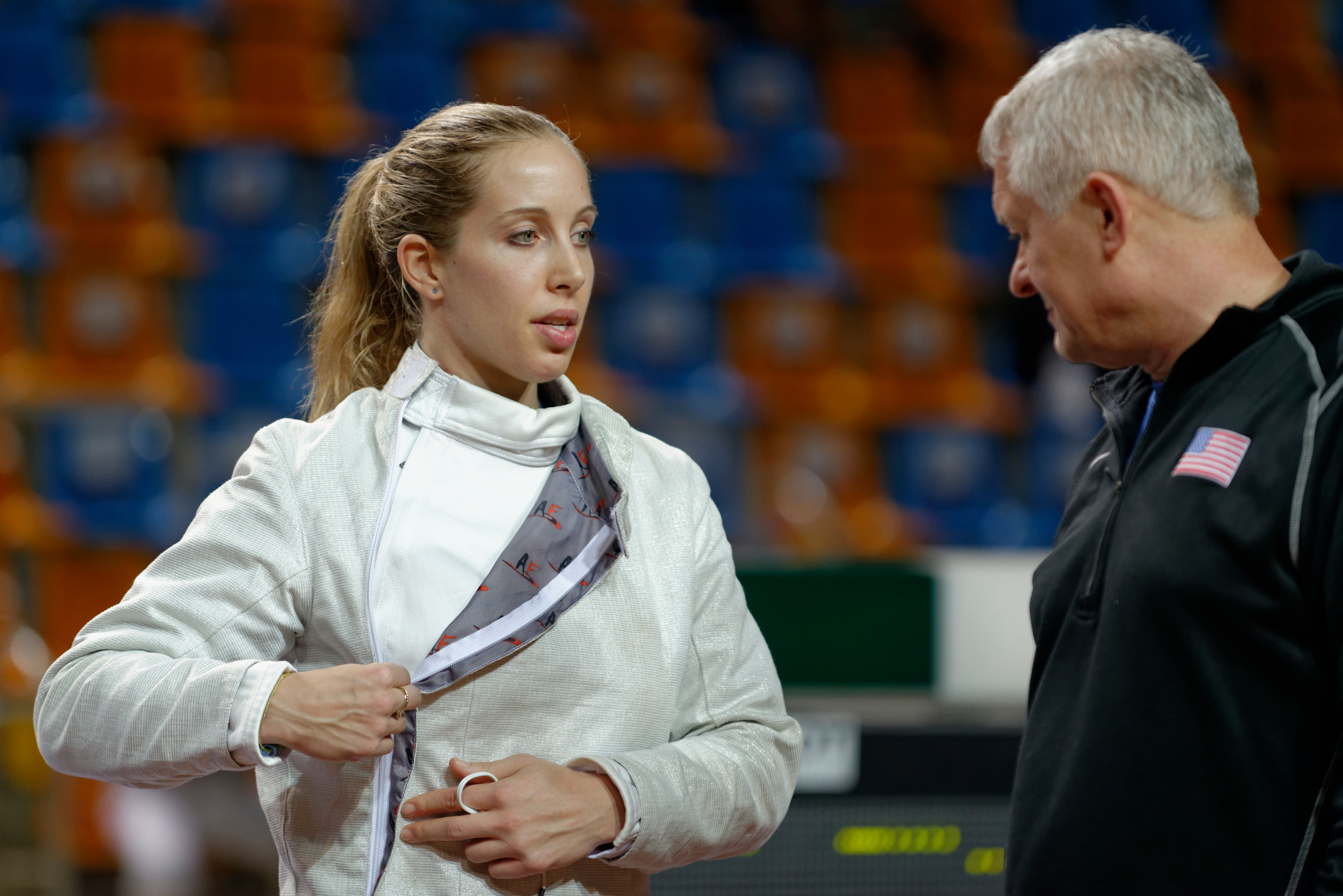
Korfanty with Mariel Zagunis at the 2014 Orléans Grand Prix

Ed Korfanty is also coach to Mariel Zagunis, who won the gold medal in the 2004 Summer Olympics in Athens - the first American to win fencing gold in 100 years. In October 2003, as a member of the FIE ad hoc committee on saber fencing, Korfanty spearheaded the change with the International Fencing Federation (FIE) in the timing in which the lights for recording a touch fired. The change shortened the time in which the second light could fire (close out time) from 300 milliseconds to 120 milliseconds, 180 milliseconds faster than the previous rule. The change was implemented in October 2004, immediately following the Athens Olympics. Other notable students include Olympian Seth Kelsey, Christine Becker, Sara Borrmann (2008 NCAA Women's Saber Champion), Valerie Providenza (2004 NCAA Women's Saber Champion), Patrick Ghattas, Ian Farr, Caity Thompson, William Thanhouser, Lian Osier, and Diamond Wheeler.

In 2005 Korfanty's students made up 75% of the U.S. Div. 1 National Women's Saber Team (consisting of Zagunis, Ward, and Thompson - fourth team member Sada Jacobson is from another club). In 2006, student Rebecca Ward became the only fencer in history to win three World Cup titles in one season.

Korfanty continues to compete internationally as a member of the U.S. National Veterans team, and has been the 50-60 age group Men's Saber World Champion three times (2002, 2003 and 2006). In 2004 and 2005 he won the silver medals at the Veterans World Championships.

Korfanty was named the U.S. Olympic Committee's Coach of the Year in 2001, 2003, and 2004. In 2005, the U.S. Fencing Coaches Association presented Korfanty with the 2005 Outstanding Coach of the Year award for his outstanding results at the international level.

Korfanty formerly resided in Portland, Oregon, acting as the head coach of the Oregon Fencing Alliance and the U.S. Women's National Saber Training Center. He currently resides in Laguna Hills, California, working as a coach at the Laguna Fencing Center.

== Education and training ==
Ed Korfanty earned his fencing master diploma at the Academy of Physical Education in Katowice, Poland, under the tutelage of Zbigniew Czajkowski. He is also certified as a fencing master by the U.S. Fencing Coaches Association and the Academie d'Armes Internationale.

== See also ==
- List of USFA Hall of Fame members
