= Kamara James =

American fencer

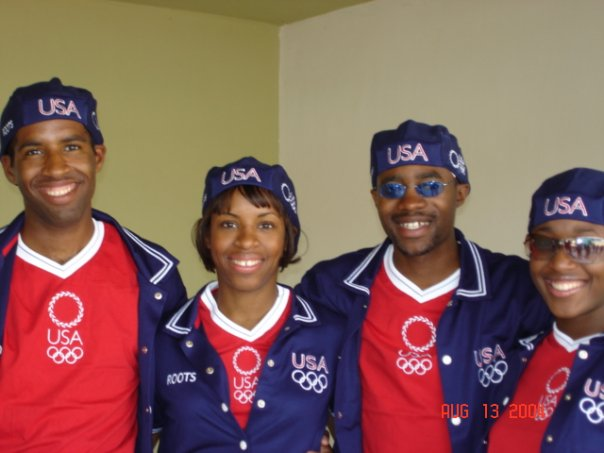
- 2004 Fencing Olympians from Peter Westbrook Foundation, Keeth Smart, Erinn Smart, Ivan Lee, and Kamara James on far right

Personal information
- Full name: Kamara Latoya James
- Born: November 23, 1984 Kingston, Jamaica
- Died: September 20, 2014 (aged 29) Modesto, California, United States
- Height: 5 ft 5.5 in (166.4 cm)
- Weight: 134 lb (61 kg)

Sport
- Country: United States
- Sport: Fencing
- Event: women's individual épée
- College team: Princeton University
- Club: Peter Westbrook Foundation
- Retired: 2004

Achievements and titles
- World finals: bronze medal (junior world championships; 2003)
- Highest world ranking: 50

Kamara Latoya James (November 23, 1984 – September 20, 2014) was an American Olympic épée fencer.

James was born in Kingston, Jamaica, into a single-parent household. Her family moved to Jamaica, Queens, New York, when she was 10. She was given a full fencing scholarship to The Dwight School, an independent college preparatory school. She then attended Princeton University on a full academic scholarship.

James began fencing at age 11, through the Peter Westbrook Foundation. In 2003, she won a bronze medal at the junior world championships.

She competed in the women's individual épée event at the 2004 Summer Olympics. James died at age 29, in September 2014.

== Early life ==
James was born in Kingston, Jamaica, in 1984, into a single-parent household. Her parents separated before she was born; she met her father only once during her childhood. Her mother, Sandra Fernandez, remarried to Delano Fernandez when James was 7.

The family moved to Jamaica, Queens, New York, three years later. She attended Public School 3 in Greenwich Village. James' stepfather died of brain cancer two years later, in 1996. James was given a full fencing scholarship to The Dwight School, an independent college preparatory school located on Manhattan’s Upper West Side, where annual tuition was $28,000.

She scored a 1,510 on her SAT. She then attended Princeton University on a full academic scholarship, majoring in religious studies.

== Fencing career ==
James began fencing at age 11 during fifth grade, through the Peter Westbrook Foundation, which had been set up by American Olympic bronze medalist Peter Westbrook to offer fencing lessons to inner-city children in New York. Andrea Schwartz, one of her teachers at Public School 3, introduced her to Westbrook.

From the age of 16, she was on the US Senior National Team in women's épée. In 2003, she won a bronze medal at the junior world championships.

She gained a world ranking of 50 in épée, which earned her a place on the Olympic team for the 2004 Summer Olympics in Athens. Morgan Stanley provided her with $50,000 towards her Olympic expenses after she served an internship at the firm.

She competed in the 2004 Olympics as a 19-year-old, the only American in the women's individual épée event. She was defeated 15–11 by 10th-seeded Russian Tatyana Logunova.

She retired from competitive fencing after the Olympics.

== Later life ==
James returned to Princeton after the Athens Olympics. James was diagnosed with schizophrenia in her senior year at Princeton, when she had a breakdown and was hospitalized for three months.

She graduated in 2007 with a degree in religious studies. She then was admitted into Harvard, to study for a master's degree in comparative religion. She then participated in the opening of a fencing club in Greenwich, Connecticut. However, subsequently she suffered a second breakdown. Due to her schizophrenia and various mental difficulties she spent much of her 20s in halfway houses or on the streets and homeless.

In 2011, she moved to Modesto, California.

James died at age 29, and was found September 20, 2014, in her apartment in Modesto, California. Her death was reported by the U.S. Olympic team in mid-October 2014. Her cause of death was not disclosed. Friends and former teammates noted that she had a mental illness. Friends indicated she had recently begun a new drug regimen to manage her condition. Her death was attributed to her difficulties with her schizophrenia and other mental difficulties.

She was buried in Farmingdale, Long Island, New York on October 25, 2014.

== See also ==
- List of Princeton University Olympians
