= Thomas Losonczy =

American fencer (born 1953)

Personal information
- Born: July 19, 1953 (age 73) Passaic, New Jersey, U.S.

Sport
- Sport: Fencing

Thomas Losonczy (born July 19, 1953) is an American former fencer. He fenced for the Columbia Lions fencing team. He competed in the team sabre event at the 1976 Summer Olympics. Losonczy also qualified for the 1980 U.S. Olympic team but did not compete due to the U.S. Olympic Committee's boycott of the 1980 Summer Olympics in Moscow, Russia. He was one of 461 athletes to receive a Congressional Gold Medal instead.

== See also ==
- List of USFA Division I National Champions
