= Akhnaten Spencer-El =

American fencer

Personal information
- Born: April 13, 1979 (age 47) Baltimore, Maryland, United States

Sport
- Sport: Fencing
Medal record
Representing United States
Pan American Games
Silver medal – second place	1999 Winnipeg	Individual sabre
Bronze medal – third place	1999 Winnipeg	Team sabre

Akhnaten "Akhi" Spencer-El (born April 13, 1979) is an American sabre fencer. He competed in the individual sabre event at the 2000 Summer Olympics, finishing 34th. Akhnaten Spencer-El joined the Columbia University fencing coaching staff in September 2013. He served as a coach for the United States in the 2016 Olympics in Rio.

Akhnaten Spencer-El joined the Columbia fencing coaching staff in September 2013.

== Sporting career ==
Spencer-El is a three-time U.S. Junior Sabre National Champion, a two-time Senior National Sabre Champion (1999, 2000), and was formerly ranked the No. 1 Junior Sabre fencer in the world (1998). He represented the United States at the 2000 Summer Olympics and served as the United States Women's National Team Saber Coach for the 2011 Pan American Games. He has also served as a coach for the United States at the 2016 Summer Olympics in Rio and 2024 Olympic Games in Paris.

Spencer-El has contributed heavily to Columbia’s success as the Lions have claimed three NCAA Fencing Championships since 2015, including back-to-back titles in 2015 and 2016. Since Spencer-El began coaching at Columbia, Lions fencers have earned 23 All-America honors in sabre and Nora Burke '23CC captured the individual national championship in 2023.

Columbia found much success in the 2018-19 season as it reclaimed the NCAA National Championship title as well as both the women's and men's outright titles for the first time since 2008. Ten of the 12 Lions that competed at NCAA Nationals were named to All-American teams, including Doddo and Burke.

Spencer-El helped lead Columbia to its second-straight NCAA Championship title in 2016 as both Geoffrey Loss (second team) and Calving Liang (honorable mention) of the men's sabre team and Lena Johnson (honorable mention) of the women's team came earned All-America honors. The 2016 squad also earned a share of the Ivy League Championship title as the Lions forced a three-way tie for first at the 2016 Ivy League Round-Robins. First-year Calvin Liang and junior Michael Costin of the men's sabre squad each earned first team All-Ivy honors after taking second and third, respectively while senior Geoffrey Loss picked up second team accolades with a fourth-place finish. On the women's side, first-year Ilana Solomon was named second team All-Ivy after finishing tied for sixth in the event. Earlier in the year, Solomon was named the CollegeFencing360.com National Rookie of the Week on January 22 following a dominating 17-1 performance with a +50 touch differential at the Penn State Invitational (Jan. 16).

In his second season with the Lions, the men’s and women’s fencing program captured the 2015 NCAA National Championship, the 14th title in program history and the first since 1993. For the first time in both program and Ivy League history, the men’s and women’s teams were ranked No. 1 simultaneously, a feat that had not been accomplished by any program since 2012. Additionally, nine Lions garnered All-American honors, the most for the program since 2007.

Columbia saw the men’s team host the Ivy League trophy in 2013-14 as the Lions’ men finished first at the Round-Robins and 29-3 overall, while the women posted a third place showing against Ancient Eight foes and finished 24-3 overall. For their efforts against the Ivies, six men and three women garnered All-Ivy League status. Spencer-El's first campaign also saw the men’s squad climb to the top of the national rankings for the first time in program history. At NCAAs, Columbia finished seventh for the second consecutive year and four Lions picked up All-American honors.

== Personal life ==
A New York City native, Spencer-El is well connected both locally and internationally. Most recently, he spent five years as a master coach at the Fencers Club and the last nine years as an assistant coaching at the Peter Westbrook Foundation.

The Peter Westbrook Foundation was where it all began for Spencer-El when he realized his passion for fencing at the age of 13. From early on, Spencer-El knew he wanted to one day become a coach. He began his coaching career in 2003 when he initiated the Young Elites of Houston fencing program, a non-profit organization designed for inner-city children.

Throughout his coaching years, Spencer-El has coached numerous elite fencers, including Ibtihaj Muhammad, 2016 Olympic bronze medalist, Dan Bak, the 2009 NCAA Team Champion, and Adrian Bak, the 2009 Junior National Team Champion.

Spencer-El resides in New Jersey with his wife and two children.

Akhnaten “Akhi” Spencer-El is a 2009 graduate of Semmelweis University in Budapest, Hungary where he completed his Maestro’s degree.

== See also ==
- List of USFA Division I National Champions
