= Christine Becker =

American fencer

Christine Becker is an American fencer, a member of the first United States women's sabre team to win the World Championship title (2000).

Becker is a member of the U.S. National women's sabre team, and president of the Oregon Fencing Alliance. She is coached by U.S. National coach Ed Korfanty.
