= Aleina Edwards =

American fencer

Aleina Grace Edwards (born August 28, 1994) is an American fencer. She placed 5th in epée at the 2009 USA Fencing Summer Nationals (Youth Division) and at the 2010 Junior Olympics. Edwards has also competed on the European circuit.
