= Ivan Lee =

American sabre fencer, referee and coach (born 1981)

- Lee in 2005

Personal information
- Full name: Ivan James Lee
- Born: March 31, 1981 (age 45) Brooklyn, New York, United States
- Height: 180 cm (5 ft 11 in)
- Weight: 70 kg (154 lb)

Sport
- Sport: Fencing
- Event: Men's Sabre
- College team: St. John's University
- Club: Peter Westbrook Foundation; Fencers Club
- Coached by: Yury Gelman
- Now coaching: Long Island University (2019–23)
Medal record
Men's fencing
Representing United States
Pan American Games
| Gold medal – first place | 2003 Santo Domingo | Individual Sabre |
| Gold medal – first place | 2003 Santo Domingo | Team Sabre |
World Championships
| Gold medal – first place | 2001 Gdańsk | Junior Team Sabre |
| Silver medal – second place | 2001 Gdańsk | Junior Individual Sabre |
| Bronze medal – third place | 1998 Valencia | Cadet Individual Sabre |
| Bronze medal – third place | 2000 South Bend | Junior Individual Sabre |
Representing St. John's University
NCAA Championships
| Gold medal – first place | 2001 Wisconsin/Parkside | Individual Sabre |
| Gold medal – first place | 2001 Wisconsin/Parkside | Team Sabre |
| Gold medal – first place | 2002 Drew | Individual Sabre |
| Silver medal – second place | 2003 Air Force | Individual Sabre |
| Bronze medal – third place | 2000 Stanford | Individual Sabre |

Ivan James Lee (born March 31, 1981) is an American former Olympic sabre fencer and coach. He was a two-time NCAA Men's Sabre Champion, a five-time national sabre champion, and was inducted into the US Fencing Association Hall of Fame. He worked as a police officer in the New York City Police Department from 2008 until 2022, and as the Women's Fencing Team Head Coach at Long Island University from 2019 until December 2023. Lee was elected Chair of the board of directors of USA Fencing in September 2023. He was suspended by USA Fencing in December 2023, for his alleged conduct that would constitute a violation of the U.S. Center for SafeSport (SafeSport) Code. Lee resigned when he was informed of his suspension. His suspension was upheld by SafeSport on January 4, 2024, lifted by SafeSport on January 16 while it continued its investigation of Lee’s conduct, and then reimposed by SafeSport in February 2024.

In February 2024 Lee was arrested on charges of forcible touching, sexual abuse, and harassment; in September 2024 he pleaded guilty at Kings County Criminal Court in Brooklyn to forcible touching-intimate parts and harassment in the second degree — physical contact.

Lee was arrested in March 2024 in Nassau County with regard to a second incident, and in December 2024 Lee pled guilty with regard to the second incident in Nassau County District Court in New York to third-degree sexual abuse and forcible touching-intimate parts. The charge carries a maximum sentence of one year in jail. According to court documents, he admitted to forcibly touching a victim without their consent.

On January 31, 2025, SafeSport permanently banned Lee from U.S. Olympic sports due to his criminal dispositions for sexual misconduct.

== 1994–2014; competitive career ==
Lee was born and raised in Brooklyn, New York, living in East Flatbush. He later lived in Cambria Heights, Queens, and Jamaica, Queens, in New York City. He began fencing in 1994 at the Peter Westbrook Foundation (PWF) in New York City, which he continued to represent throughout his competitive career along with the Fencers Club in Manhattan. Lee graduated from Brooklyn Technical High School in Brooklyn, in 1999.

He received a full athletic scholarship to St. John's University in Queens, New York. There, Lee won the NCAA individual sabre title in 2001 and 2002, and along with fellow future Olympian and longtime clubmate, friend, and sabre fencer Keeth Smart, helped lead the school to an NCAA national championship in 2001.

Lee was a member of the 2001 U.S. Junior World Sabre team. He anchored the team to its first men's world title at the 2001 Junior World Championships in Gdańsk, Poland, and also became the first man of African American descent to win a world fencing championship. He was awarded the USOC's Male Athlete of the Year Award for Fencing in 2001. He went on to win individual and team gold medals at the 2003 Pan American Games in Santo Domingo, Dominican Republic. He graduated from St. John's in January 2004 with a bachelor's degree in Journalism.

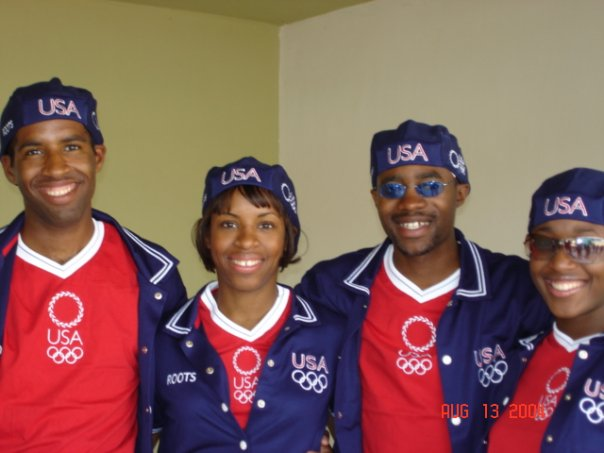
2004 fencing Olympians from Peter Westbrook Foundation, Keeth Smart, Erinn Smart, Ivan Lee, and Kamara James (l-r)

Lee was a member of the 2004 U.S. Olympic Team in Athens, Greece. He placed 12th in the individual competition and 4th in the team competition. To be successful in fencing, which he likened to physical chess, he said it was most important to be intelligent and "brutally aggressive."

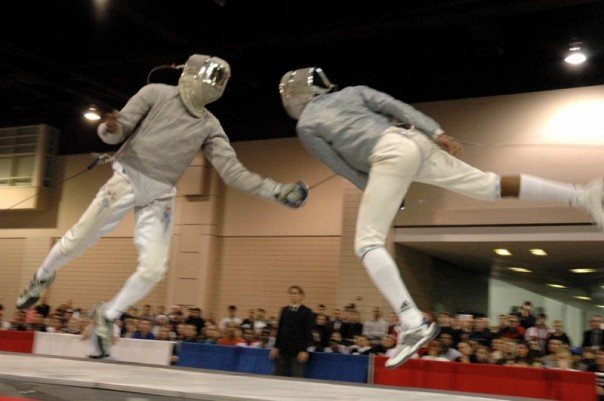
Ivan Lee and Keeth Smart fencing each other; 2006

After failing to qualify for the 2008 Olympic Team, Lee retired in 2008. Prior to his retirement, in 2008 he won his fifth U.S. Senior Championship, a title he had also won in 2001, 2003, 2005, and 2006, but his poor results in international tournaments kept him from making the US Olympic Team. Lee was inducted into the US Fencing Association Hall of Fame in 2014. He has been a competitive veteran fencer, and won two consecutive national titles in Vet-40 men’s saber.

== 2015–23; college coach and USA Fencing Chair ==
Lee was the Head Coach of the Women's Fencing Team of Long Island University from March 2019 until December 1, 2023, when he resigned. It was his first coaching position, and he said: "I love coaching. It’s very rewarding." At the 2021 NCAA National Championship, his freshman fencer Laura Fekete—whom he had recruited—won the gold medal in épée, the first NCAA fencing championship in school history. In 2022 she won the bronze medal. Fekete said: "Ivan helped me with everything he could. He was always by my side."

Lee was elected Chairman of the Board of Directors of USA Fencing in September 2023.

== 2023–present; suspension, arrests, guilty pleas, lifetime ban ==
Lee was suspended by USA Fencing on December 22, 2023, for his alleged conduct that would constitute a violation of the SafeSport Code. Lee resigned as Chairman of the Board when he was informed of his suspension.

Lee was arrested in February 2024 on forcible touching, sexual abuse, and harassment charges. They related to an incident in November 2023 in a college gym while he was the Head Coach of the Women's Fencing Team of Long Island University. He pleaded guilty September 3, 2024, at Kings County Criminal Court in Brooklyn to forcible touching-intimate parts and harassment in the second degree — physical contact.

Lee was arrested in March 2024 in Nassau County with regard to a second incident, and in December 2024 Lee pled guilty with regard to the second incident in Nassau County District Court in New York to third-degree sexual abuse and forcible touching-intimate parts. He admitted to forcibly touching a victim without their consent. Upon sentencing in May 2025, one plea was vacated after Lee participated in a court ordered treatment program. Lee was given six years of probation and ordered to enroll in a program for sex offenders for the other charges.

He was stripped of his membership in the USA Fencing Hall of Fame and received a lifetime ban from SafeSport.

== Professional and volunteer work ==
=== Police officer ===
Lee worked as a police officer in the New York City Police Department (NYPD) from July 2008 until February 2022. He spent his first six years on the police force in the NYPD transit bureau, and his last seven years as a physical training instructor at the Police Academy.

=== Other ===
He also served as the Fencing Commissioner for the Public Schools Athletic League (PSAL) from 2008 to 2019. The PSAL is a scholastic athletic program that coordinates sports competitions for New York City public high schools.

He was a board member of the Rosalyn Yalow Charter School in the Bronx from 2014 until 2023. He has served as a deacon, administrator, and youth leader at his church, taught classes at PWF, mentored high school and college students at the USOC's F.L.A.M.E. (Finding Leaders Among Minorities Everywhere) program, and counseled teenagers at New Horizons Ministries.

He founded a fencing club called Naviblue Sports in New York. Lee has also been the Head Sabre Coach at Long Island Fencing Center in Carle Place, New York.

== Personal ==
Ivan is the only child of Wesley Desmond Lee and Cynthia Lee. His mother, a retired teacher, heard from a fellow teacher who was the mother of future Olympic medalists Erinn Smart and Keeth Smart, that her children participated in a non-profit fencing program for children in Manhattan, the PWF. Mrs. Lee talked her son into trying it. Lee initially instead wanted to play baseball in high school and beyond. But his father, an auto mechanic and pastor of Ebenezer Missionary Chapel in Brooklyn, convinced him to take fencing seriously because of what he saw as the college scholarship possibility in fencing.

Lee and his wife, Shameeka Waddell Lee, have two children.

== Awards and honors ==
- 2004 U.S. Olympic Team member
- Five-time Division 1 Men's Sabre National Champion (2001, 2003, 2005, 2006, 2008)
- 2021, 2022, 2023 Veteran-40 Men's Sabre National Champion
- 2003 Pan American Men's Sabre Champion
- 2003 Pan American Men's Sabre Team Champion
- 2001, 2002 NCAA Men's Sabre Champion
- 2001 USOC Male Athlete of the Year, Fencing
- US Fencing Association Hall of Fame inductee, class of 2014 (Removed 2025)

== See also ==
- List of USFA Division I National Champions
- Alen Hadzic, permanently banned American fencer
