= Alen Hadzic =

American fencer (born 1991)

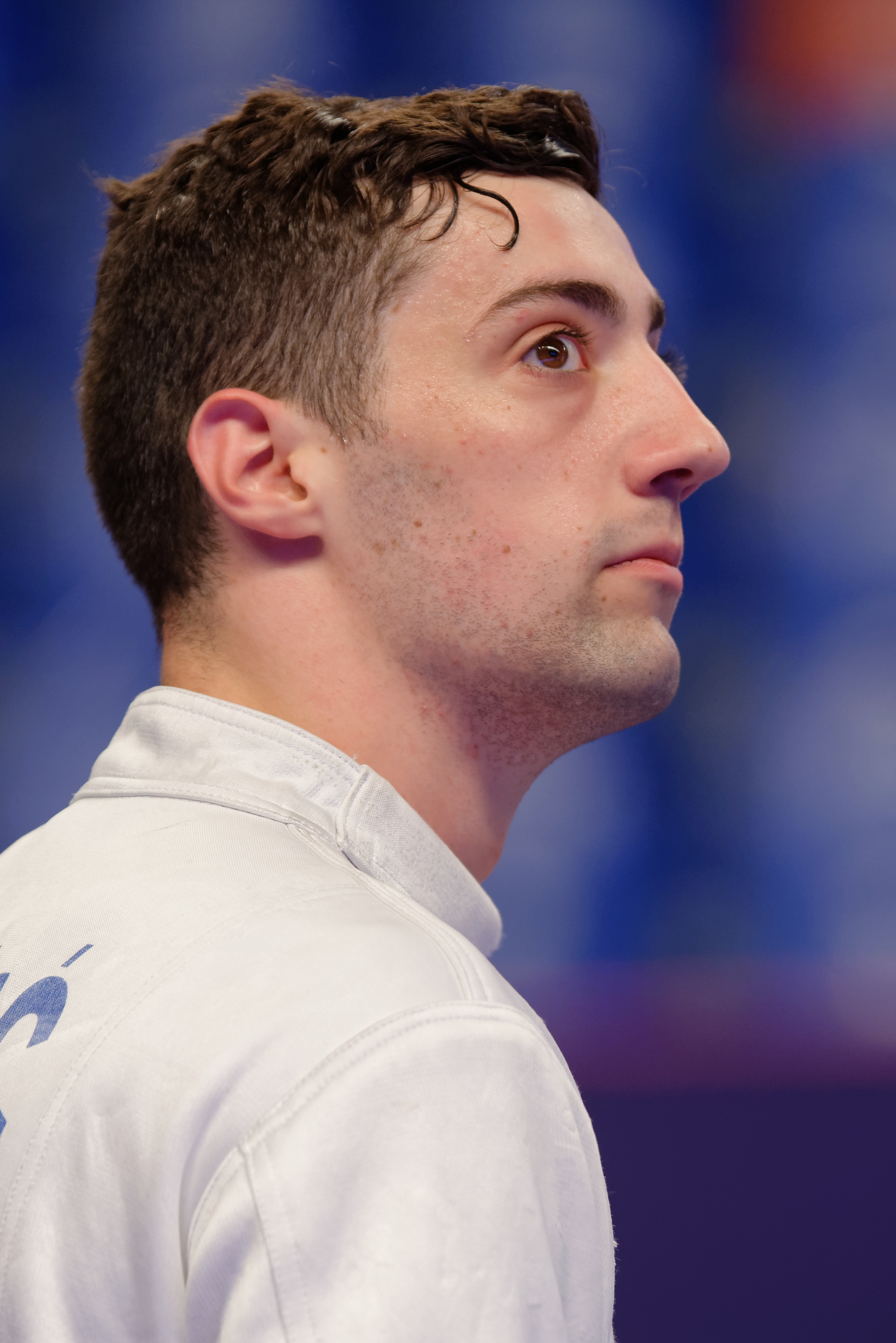
- Alen Hadzic (2016)

Personal information
- Native name: Alen Hadžić
- Born: November 15, 1991 (age 35) Paterson, New Jersey

Fencing career
- Sport: Fencing
- Weapon: épée
- Hand: right
- Club: Fencers Club
- Former coach: Michael Aufrichtig; Alexey Cheremsky

Alen Hadzic (Alen Hadžić; born November 15, 1991) is an American former épée fencer. In 2023, he was ranked 361st in the world in men's épée.

In 2013, Hadzic was suspended by Columbia University for one year due to a sexual assault allegation. In June 2021, three women accused Hadzic of committing sexual misconduct against them. In the summer of 2021 he traveled to the Tokyo Olympics as an alternate on the men's épée team, but did not compete. By July 2022, at least six women had filed claims of sexual misconduct against Hadzic with SafeSport. In June 2023, after an investigation of over two years, Hadzic was permanently banned by SafeSport from participating in any activity of or under the United States Olympic & Paralympic Committee. The decision was upheld on appeal in December 2023.

== Early years ==
Hadzic was born in Paterson, New Jersey, on November 15, 1991. He later moved to West Orange. He is fluent in Bosnian-Croatian-Serbian.

He grew up in Montclair, New Jersey, and attended Montclair High School ('10). There, he fenced épée for the fencing team.

== College ==
Hadzic then attended Columbia University. There, he fenced épée for two years for the Columbia Lions under head coach Michael Aufrichtig (who later served on the USA Fencing board of directors). In 2011-12 fencing for Columbia, he had a record of 32–22.

=== Title IX suspension ===
While he was attending Columbia University, a complaint of sexual abuse by Hadzic as he pinned her down was lodged against him with the university by a student, and an investigation under Title IX was undertaken. At the time, he already had a reputation for targeting drunk women at parties. Due to the results of the investigation which found him responsible, Hadzic was suspended by Columbia University for the 2013-14 year, and kicked off the fencing team. He later studied at the Vlerick Business School in Belgium.

== Fencing career ==
=== 2013–19 ===
Though Hadzic was banned from representing Columbia University, he wasn't banned from fencing at large. His club was the Fencers Club in New York City, with Alexey Cheremsky as his coach.

In October 2013 the lawyer for the woman who was the victim in Hadzic's 2013 Title IX case urged USA Fencing to bar Hadzic from competitions, noting that Hadzic had been suspended from his university after an investigation into an accusation that he had sexually assaulted a woman. Both the victim and Hadzic were USA Fencing members. But USA Fencing CEO Kris Ekeren asserted to the attorney that Hadzic hadn't violated any of USA Fencing's policies, inasmuch as Hadzic wasn't a coach or authority figure, and the alleged conduct didn't take place at a USA Fencing event.

In 2015, Hadzic was coaching both boys and girls on the Tappan Zee High School fencing team, in Orangeburg, New York. That same year, a young woman said, Hadzic groped her.

=== 2020–21 ===
In June 2021, the U.S. Center for SafeSport temporarily suspended Hadzic from any fencing activities, after three women accused him of committing sexual misconduct against them, and at least 10 witnesses submitted statements supporting the claimants' allegations. But later that month an arbitrator, who reviewed the suspension without hearing from any of Hadzic's accusers, though she left in place a directive for Hadzic not to contact his accusers, lifted the temporary suspension until his investigation was complete. She did so, opining that if Hadzic were to participate on the Olympic team, in her view it would not be “detrimental to the reputation of the United States or his sport.”

With his temporary suspension lifted for the moment, in the summer of 2021 he traveled to the Tokyo Olympics as an alternate on the men's épée team; he never did compete at all at the Olympics, however, and was therefore not an Olympian. USA Fencing imposed a "safety plan" to keep Hadzic away from other athletes in Tokyo for their safety, including requiring him to fly to Tokyo separately from his teammates, requiring him to stay at a separate remote hotel that was outside the Olympic Village where his teammates were housed, and banning him from practicing near female teammates. When Hadzic protested that it was unfair to keep him from staying in the Olympic Village where his teammates were staying, his 23 Team USA fencing teammates unanimously signed a statement calling for him to be banned from their accommodations, for their safety and well-being. They wrote that they "vehemently oppose[d]" Hadzic living in the Olympic Village, saying:

We are all aware of the accusations of sexual assault raised against Alen. Many of us have been bystanders and/or witnesses to his conduct, over many years. We, the athletes, will feel extremely unsafe and uncomfortable should Alen be transferred to live in the Olympic Village. Hundreds of other US athletes, coaches, and staff, not to mention the thousands of international Olympic stakeholders staying in the village, will be unknowingly also put at risk due to Alen’s presence.

Hadzic unsuccessfully appealed USA Fencing's safety plan, as an independent arbitrator ruled against him.

While taking a team photo at the Games, three of Hadzic's Team USA teammates in protest wore pink COVID-19 masks, while standing next to him as he alone wore a black mask. Hadzic reacted by later confronting two of the fencers, and chewing them out. Hadzic's case garnered national attention, with women athletes speaking out against his ability to represent the U.S., and caused what BuzzFeed News called an "unprecedented uproar and backlash during ... [the] Games. Nevertheless, Radical Fencing, his equipment sponsor, continued its relationship with him, supplying him with fencing equipment.

After the Olympics, USA Fencing was heavily criticized by athletes and parents about the Hadzic debacle. In a call between USA Fencing’s executives and board members about the Hadzic matter, at-large director David Alperstein waved off concerns, saying: "This will all blow over." Its long-time CEO Kris Ekeren and general counsel Jim Neale subsequently resigned.

In October 2021, USA Fencing blocked Hadzic from entering any competitions "for the foreseeable future, except to the extent it is legally compelled to do so."

=== 2022–present ===
By July 2022, at least six women had filed claims of sexual misconduct, including rape, against Hadzic with SafeSport. At least one said Hadzic had sex with her when she was a minor in high school, despite her repeatedly saying no. That month SafeSport put in place safeguards that USA Fencing itself had already established a year prior to protect people in the fencing community, requiring Hadzic to not communicate in any way with what were now six victims, to not stay in the same hotel or housing as "any female athletes or coaches of the US delegation," and requiring him to have a chaperone when at fencing competitions.

In 2023, he was ranked 361st in the world in men's épée.

In June 2023, after an investigation of over two years, due to his sexual misconduct Hadzic was permanently banned by SafeSport, which also imposed no-contact directives upon him. His ban prohibits him from participating "in any capacity, in any event, program, activity, or competition authorized by, organized by, or under the auspices of the United States Olympic & Paralympic Committee (USOPC), the National Governing Bodies recognized by the USOPC, a Local Affiliated Organization as defined by the [SafeSport] Code, or at a facility under the exclusive jurisdiction of the same."

In December 2023, SafeSport's decision to permanently ban Hadzic was upheld on appeal, ensuring that he is never again allowed to compete in [U.S.] fencing competitions. USA Fencing issued a statement saying that the decision: "should serve as a stern warning to everyone that conduct that is threatening, harmful or inappropriate toward anyone in our sport will not be tolerated."
