= United States Fencing Association =

Governing body for the sport of fencing in the United States

USA Fencing
- Sport: Fencing
- Category: 501(c)(3) non-profit
- Jurisdiction: United States
- Founded: April 22, 1891; 135 years ago
- Affiliation: FIE
- Regional affiliation: Pan American Fencing Confederation
- Headquarters: 210 USA Cycling Point; Colorado Springs, Colorado, United States
- CEO: Phil Andrews
- Operating income: $8.4 million (2020)

Official website
- www.usafencing.org
- (United States)

The United States Fencing Association (USFA) is the national governing body for the sport of fencing in the United States. The USFA was founded in 1891 as the Amateur Fencers League of America (AFLA) by a group of New York fencers seeking independence from the Amateur Athletic Union. The AFLA changed its name to the United States Fencing Association in 1981, and is also known as USA Fencing.

The USFA was incorporated as a non-profit corporation in Pennsylvania in 1964 and in Colorado in 1993, in compliance with the Olympic and Amateur Sports Act. It opened its national office at the Olympic Training Center in Colorado Springs, Colorado in August 1982. The national office moved from the Olympic Training Center to downtown Colorado Springs in 2002. The USFA's first full-time Executive Director was hired in 1983.

The USFA is affiliated with the FIE, the international federation for fencing founded in Paris in 1913.

== History ==
The organization was founded on April 22, 1891, in New York City, initially as the Amateur Fencers League of America (AFLA). Graeme Hammond was its first president, from 1891 to 1925. The AFLA was incorporated as a non-profit corporation in Pennsylvania in 1964, and changed its name to the United States Fencing Association in 1981. It was incorporated in Colorado in 1993 in compliance with the Olympic and Amateur Sports Act. The organization opened its national office at the Olympic Training Center in Colorado Springs, Colorado, in 1982. The national office subsequently moved from the Olympic Training Center to downtown Colorado Springs in 2002.

On March 10, 2023, USA Fencing announced it would vote against reinstating Russian and Belarusian athletes during the International Fencing Federation (FIE) Extraordinary Congress. Athletes from those two countries had been suspended a year earlier after Russia's full-scale invasion of Ukraine.

Despite USA Fencing's advocacy, more than 60% of nations affiliated with the FIE voted to reinstate fencers and officials from Russia and Belarus and allow them to compete in international fencing competitions. USA Fencing stated that it was "disappointed, frustrated and disturbed — though not all that surprised — at the outcome of today’s vote" and that "today’s 'yes' vote by more than 80 delegates, while not a direct endorsement of Russia's war, does send a message to the world that a majority of the international fencing community is ready to look the other way and welcome back fencers funded by and supported by the Russian government."

On March 17, 2023, the International Fencing Federation (FIE) forced Team USA athletes competing at the South Korea Grand Prix to remove ribbons featuring the colors of the Ukrainian flag from their hands. Ukrainian Olympic champion Olha Kharlan fiercely protested the FIE's decision. Ukrainian born-American Olympic fencing coach Yury Gelman said that the FIE was the most corrupt federation in the world.

In 2023, USA Fencing granted Russians living in the United States the right to compete in American competitions if they signed a declaration against the Russian invasion of Ukraine. On the Fourth of July weekend in 2023, Russian Olympian Konstantin Lokhanov, who had moved to the United States as he opposed the war, won the gold medal in the individual men’s saber competition at the United States Summer National Championships, in which 155 competitors competed. Lokhanov had also been married to Russian Olympic gold medal-winning fencer Sofia Pozdniakova until they divorced because of political differences. Pozdniakova is the daughter of Stanislav Pozdnyakov, the president of the Russian Olympic Committee, himself a former fencer and four-time Olympic gold medalist. Ukrainian saber fencer Darii Lukashenko and Lokhanov embraced and held the Ukrainian flag together to express their support for Ukrainians during the Russian invasion. Russian Olympic silver medalist Sergey Bida, who had also left Russia for the United States as he opposed the invasion, won a gold medal in the team men’s épée competition National Championships, in which sixty men's épée teams competed.

== Ratings ==
The USFA tracks ratings for its members. Ratings are a system of classification for USFA fencers; they are primarily used to seed tournaments, but are also considered to be broad indicators of skill. When a fencer first joins the USFA, he or she will have a classification of "U", or "Unrated." There are six different ratings in the USFA those being U (the lowest rating), E, D, C, B, A (the highest rating). The letter rating is further modified by a 2-digit number representing the year (e.g. 25 for the year, 2025) in which the fencer earned that letter rating. If the fencer does not re-earn or earn a higher letter rating within 4 years, the letter rating will drop to the next lower rating and the year downgrades to the year the drop occurred. Having the 2-digit year allows for more precise seeding of the fencers in a competition. For example, a fencer with a rating of B23 will be seeded higher than one with a rating of B22 or B21. A B-rated fencer is always seeded above a C or lower rated fencer regardless of whether the B rating was earned before the C or lower ratings. That is, a B20 fencer is seeded higher than a D23 fencer. Fencers may increase their classification by placing in USFA-sanctioned tournaments. It is possible to "skip" or "jump" ratings. That is, it is possible for a U-rated fencer to jump immediately to an A rating by finishing high enough in a significantly strong competition. A tournament must have a certain number of competitors, and those competitors must maintain a certain ratio of classifications, for the top fencers to be eligible for ratings.

== Hall of Fame ==
The United States Fencing Hall of Fame (or "U.S. Fencing Association Hall of Fame") is a hall of fame for athletes, coaches, and other members of the sport. It is located in the Museum of American Fencing in Shreveport, Louisiana. It was founded as the National Fencing Coaches Association Hall of Fame on February 15, 1963, and was previously located at Helms Sports Hall of Fame, founded in 1936 in Los Angeles, California.

No one was inducted into the Fencing Hall of Fame during the years 1975–1994, due to physical moves and organizational changes, including its takeover by the Amateur Athletic Foundation.

Through September 2021, US fencers had won 33 Olympic medals and 38 World Championships medals.

== Controversy and incidents ==
=== Disciplinary decisions ===
Two-time Olympian Nzingha Prescod was elected as an athlete director on the USA Fencing Board of Directors beginning on January 1, 2021, as the top vote-getter in a vote by athletes who represented the U.S. at the Olympics or Paralympics, Pan American Games, or Senior World Championships. Prescod stated that in 2020 the organization's disciplinary decisions "reeked of lenience and favorability for the offender."

=== Alen Hadzic ===
In 2021, fencer Alen Hadzic was the subject of rape and other sexual misconduct allegations. The findings of an initial investigation of the accusations led to him being temporarily suspended. On appeal, an arbitrator reduced the temporary sanctions against him, and he was permitted to go to the Tokyo Olympics as an alternate, although he ended up not competing. At that point, his Team USA teammates expressed concerns for their safety and well-being in his presence. USA Fencing therefore prohibited him from staying at his teammates' hotel. Hadzic's lawyer said USA Fencing had known of the allegations made by the three women against Hadzic "for years," but until the Olympics had never put a restriction in place for Hadzic while he competed all over the world with USA Fencing teams. Hadzic sought to overturn the restriction in arbitration, without success. He had previously been suspended by Columbia University for a year for sexual misconduct, as a result of the findings of a Title IX investigation of his behavior. By October 2021, a total of at least six sexual misconduct complaints, including rape, had been filed against Hadzic. USA Fencing stated in 2022: "We understand that many in the USA Fencing community will question Alen Hadzic’s inclusion on our 2022 Senior World Team, given that he is still under investigation by the U.S. Center for SafeSport — an independent body separate from USA Fencing. We had hoped for a swifter resolution to this investigation, which has now stretched on for more than a year. We share in the frustration of fencers and fencing fans… SafeSport has the exclusive authority to adjudicate reports of alleged sexual abuse and sexual misconduct. As long as the outcome of this investigation remains unresolved, USA Fencing is obligated to allow Hadzic to compete internationally. But we have taken decisive action where we can. For the past year, we have implemented a safety plan designed to protect athletes, coaches and staff at all tournaments at which Hadzic has been a participant. While we await the conclusion of this protracted investigation, we will continue to put the safety of our athletes, coaches and staff above all else."

During the Hadzic scandal, it was disclosed by the press in 2021 that USA Fencing had received a sexual assault complaint about Hadzic by a fellow USA Fencing fencer in 2013, but not acted on it. The lawyer for the complainant had written to former CEO Kris Ekeren in 2013: "How can the [US Fencing Association], in good conscience, claim its hands are tied and permit the participation of a known rapist into its athletic midst?" However, Ekeren did not respond further to the lawyer, and the letters were not made public for eight years. In the wake of that disclosure, USA Fencing's Executive Director/CEO Kris Ekeren and General Counsel Jim Neale both resigned.

In June 2023, due to his sexual misconduct Hadzic was permanently banned by SafeSport, which also imposed no-contact directives upon him. His ban prohibits him from participating "in any capacity, in any event, program, activity, or competition authorized by, organized by, or under the auspices of the United States Olympic & Paralympic Committee (USOPC), the National Governing Bodies recognized by the USOPC, a Local Affiliated Organization as defined by the [SafeSport] Code, or at a facility under the exclusive jurisdiction of the same." In December 2023, SafeSport’s decision to permanently ban Hadzic was upheld on appeal, ensuring that he will never again allowed to compete in U.S. fencing competitions. USA Fencing issued a statement saying that the decision: "should serve as a stern warning to everyone that conduct that is threatening, harmful or inappropriate toward anyone in our sport will not be tolerated."

=== Robert Piraino ===
In August 2022, a lawsuit was filed against USA Fencing, alleging that its officials knew that fencing coach Robert Piraino was engaging in sexually abusive behavior, but that the organization failed to act before the fencing coach then sexually abused a 13-year-old girl and a 17-year-old boy. In a federal criminal action against him, Piraino pleaded guilty and was sentenced to 25 years in prison. In August 2023, the judge dismissed some of the claims against USA Fencing.

=== Curtis McDowald ===
In June 2023, USA Today reported that fencer Curtis McDowald through his misbehavior at the 2023 Pan American Fencing Championships may have severely damaged the opportunity of his entire Team USA men's épée squad to compete at the 2024 Paris Olympics. USA Fencing released a statement saying: "We are disappointed by Curtis's actions and regret that they have harmed Team USA's chances of fielding a men's épée team for the 2024 Olympics. Following a hearing, Curtis has been formally removed from the Pan-American Championships team pending potential further review after the tournament. He will not be eligible to fence at the 2023 Fencing World Championships in Milan, Italy." The statement effectively barred McDowald from competing at the 2023 World Fencing Championships. In August 2025, McDowald was suspended by USA Fencing for a five-year period for violating its rules of conduct.

=== Ivan Lee ===
In 2025, after two criminal convictions for sexual misconduct, former Olympian and USA Fencing chairman Ivan Lee was stripped of his membership in the USA Fencing Hall of Fame and received a lifetime ban from SafeSport.

=== Stephanie Turner ===
In March 2025, Maryland fencer Stephanie Turner refused to fence trans woman opponent Red Sullivan, instead calling her a man, taking a knee in protest, and removing her mask, earning a disqualification for unsportsmanlike conduct. The video of this incident went viral, and Sullivan was removed from her college's fencing team; along with a congressional hearing being held on the incident. USA Fencing subsequently agreed to restrict women's fencing to cisgender women only. USFA had previously stated that there were fewer than 50 transgender fencers among the 40,000 registered USA Fencing members.

== See also ==
- Collegiate fencing
- U.S. Fencing Coaches Association
