= List of flag bearers for Benin at the Olympics =

Benin at the Olympics
- IOC code: BEN
- NOC: Benin National Olympic and Sports Committee
- Medals: Gold 0 Silver 0 Bronze 0 Total 0

Summer appearances
- 1972; 1976; 1980; 1984; 1988; 1992; 1996; 2000; 2004; 2008; 2012; 2016; 2020; 2024

This is a list of flag bearers who have represented Benin at the Olympics.

Flag bearers carry the national flag of their country at the opening ceremony of the Olympic Games.

#	Event year	Season	Flag bearer	Sport
1	1972	Summer		
2	1980	Summer		
3	1984	Summer	Firmin Abissi	Boxing
4	1988	Summer	Félicite Bada	Athletics
5	1992	Summer	Sonya Agbéssi	Athletics
6	1996	Summer	Laure Kuetey	Athletics
7	2000	Summer	Laure Kuetey	Athletics
8	2004	Summer	Fabienne Féraez	Athletics
9	2008	Summer	Fabienne Féraez	Athletics
10	2012	Summer	Jacob Gnahoui	Judo
11	2016	Summer	Yémi Apithy	Fencing
12	2020	Summer	Privel Hinkati	Rowing
12	2020	Summer	Nafissath Radji	Swimming
13	2024	Summer	Valentin Houinato	Judo
13	2024	Summer	Noélie Yarigo	Athletics

== See also ==
- Benin at the Olympics
