= Dahomey at the 1972 Summer Olympics =

- Flag of Dahomey
- IOC code: DAH
- NOC: Dahomey Olympic Committee

in Munich
- Competitors: 3 (3 men and 0 women) in 2 sports
- Flag bearer: Leopold Agbazo
- Medals: Gold 0 Silver 0 Bronze 0 Total 0

Summer Olympics appearances (overview)
- 1972; 1976; 1980; 1984; 1988; 1992; 1996; 2000; 2004; 2008; 2012; 2016; 2020; 2024

Dahomey (now Benin) sent three delegations to compete at the 1972 Summer Olympics in Munich, West Germany from 26 August to 11 September 1972. This was the country's first appearance at a Summer Olympic Games. The delegation consisted of three people, a sprinter, Ibrahima Idrissou, who did not advance past the first heat, boxers Meriga Salou Seriki and Leopold Agbazo who both did not advance to the second round.

== Background ==
The Benin National Olympic and Sports Committee (French: Comité National Olympique et Sportif Béninois) was recognized by the International Olympic Committee on 1 January 1962. Their debut was not until 10 years later at the 1972 Summer Olympics. The 1972 Summer Olympics were held from 26 August to 11 September 1976; a total of 7,134 athletes, representing 121 National Olympic Committees took part in the Games. Beninese delegation to Munich consisted of two boxers, Meriga Salou Seriki, Leopold Agbazo and a sprinter, Ibrahima Idrissou, Nobody was selected as the flag-bearer for the opening ceremony.

== Athletics ==
Ibrahima Idrissou was about 32 years old at the time of the Munich Olympics and making his Olympic debut. On 27 August, he took part in the 400 metres competition, where his time was 48.5 seconds in the seventh heat of round 1. Christoph Chodaton was supposed to participate in the men's triple jump but did not start.

Men's 400 metres

Athlete	Event	Heat		Quarterfinal		Semifinal		Final		Ref
Athlete	Event	Result	Rank	Result	Rank	Result	Rank	Result	Rank	Ref
Ibrahima Idrissou	400 m	48.50	6	did not advance						
Christoph Chodaton	Men's Triple Jump	did not start								

== Boxing ==
Meriga Salou Seriki was 19 years old at the time of the Munich Olympics and making his Olympic debut. He lost to his opponent, Said Ahmed El-Ashry, who got a total of 299 points. Seriki got 274 points, 25 less than El-Ashry, therefore disqualifying him and meaning he did not advance to round two.

Men

Athlete	Event	1 Round	2 Round	3 Round	Quarterfinals	Semifinals	Final	Ref
Athlete	Event	Opposition Result	Opposition Result	Opposition Result	Opposition Result	Opposition Result	Rank	Ref
Meriga Salou Seriki	Light Flyweight	Said Ahmed El-Ashry (EGY); L 0-5	did not advance					
Leopold Agbazo	Bantamweight	Abdelaziz Hammi (TUN); L 0-5	did not advance					
