= Benin at the 1984 Summer Olympics =

- Flag of Benin
- IOC code: BEN
- NOC: Benin National Olympic and Sports Committee

in Los Angeles
- Competitors: 3 in 1 sport
- Flag bearer: Firmin Abissi
- Medals: Gold 0 Silver 0 Bronze 0 Total 0

Summer Olympics appearances (overview)
- 1972; 1976; 1980; 1984; 1988; 1992; 1996; 2000; 2004; 2008; 2012; 2016; 2020; 2024

Benin competed at the 1984 Summer Olympics in Los Angeles, United States, which were held from 28 July to 12 August 1984. The country's participation in Los Angeles marked its third appearance at the Summer Olympics since its debut in 1972, and after boycotting the 1976 Summer Olympics. The Beninoise delegation consisted of three athletes: boxers Firmin Abissi, Georges Boco, and Maxime Mehinto.

Mehinto competed first for the nation, doing so in the light middleweight event. Boco competed the following day in the welterweight event. Abissi competed last in the bantamweight. All of them failed to make it past the second round. Thus, Benin has yet to win an Olympic medal.

== Background ==
The 1984 Summer Olympics were held in Los Angeles, United States, from 28 July to 12 August 1984. This edition of the games marked Benin's third appearance at the Summer Olympics since its debut at the 1972 Summer Olympics, and after boycotting the 1976 Summer Olympics due to the refusal of the International Olympic Committee to ban New Zealand, after the New Zealand national rugby union team had toured South Africa earlier in 1976. It was believed that Benin would boycott the 1984 Summer Olympics due to pressures from the Soviet Union. The nation had never won a medal at the Olympic Games, with its best finish coming from boxer Barthelémy Adoukonu in the men's featherweight event at the 1980 Summer Olympics in Moscow.

== Boxing ==
The boxing events were held at the Los Angeles Memorial Sports Arena. Maxime Mehinto was the first competitor to compete for Benin at these Games, competing in the second round of the light middleweight event. He competed on 31 July against Abdellah Tibazi of Morocco though lost the match 5 to 0 in favour of Tibazi.

Georges Boco competed the following day, competing in the second round of the welterweight event. He competed against Luciano Bruno of Italy and lost 5 to 0 in favour of Bruno, with United Press International opining that Bruno had "launched a brutal body attack" on Boco. Firmin Abissi was the last athlete to compete for Benin, doing so in the second round of the bantamweight event. He fought against Babar Ali Khan of Pakistan and lost his match 5 to 0 in favour of Khan.

Men

Athlete	Event	1 Round	2 Round	3 Round	Quarterfinals	Semifinals	Final
Athlete	Event	Opposition Result	Opposition Result	Opposition Result	Opposition Result	Opposition Result	Rank
Firmin Abissi	Bantamweight	Bye	Babar Ali Khan (PAK); L 0-5	did not advance			
Georges Boco	Welterweight	Bye	Luciano Bruno (ITA); L 0-5	did not advance			
Maxime Mehinto	Light middleweight	Bye	Abdellah Tibazi (MAR); L 0-5	did not advance			
