= Benin at the 1992 Summer Olympics =

- Flag of Benin
- IOC code: BEN
- NOC: Benin National Olympic and Sports Committee

in Barcelona, Spain 25 July–9 August 1992
- Competitors: 6 (4 men, 2 women) in 2 sports
- Flag bearer: Sonya Agbéssi
- Medals: Gold 0 Silver 0 Bronze 0 Total 0

Summer Olympics appearances (overview)
- 1972; 1976; 1980; 1984; 1988; 1992; 1996; 2000; 2004; 2008; 2012; 2016; 2020; 2024

Benin competed at the 1992 Summer Olympics in Barcelona, Spain. Six competitors, four men and two women, took part in six events in two sports.

== Competitors ==
The following is the list of number of competitors in the Games.

Sport	Men	Women	Total
Athletics	2	2	4
Cycling	2	–	2
Total	4	2	6

== Athletics ==
Men

Athlete	Event	Heat		Quarterfinal		Semifinal		Final	
Athlete	Event	Result	Rank	Result	Rank	Result	Rank	Result	Rank
Pascal Dangbo	100 m	11.03	60	did not advance					
Idrissou Tamimou	800 m	DNF		did not advance					
Idrissou Tamimou	1500 m	3:56.45	12	did not advance					

Women

Athlete	Event	Heat		Quarterfinal		Semifinal		Final	
Athlete	Event	Result	Rank	Result	Rank	Result	Rank	Result	Rank
Laure Kuetey	100 m	13.11	52	did not advance					

Field events

Athlete	Event	Qualification		Final	
Athlete	Event	Distance	Position	Distance	Position
Sonya Agbessi	Long jump	5.64	28	did not advance	

== Cycling ==
Two male cyclists represented Benin in 1992.

=== Road ===
Athlete	Event	Time	Rank
Fernand Gandaho	Men's road race	DNF	
Cossi Houegban	Men's road race	DNF	
