= Benin at the 1980 Summer Olympics =

- Flag of Benin
- IOC code: BEN
- NOC: Benin National Olympic and Sports Committee

in Moscow
- Competitors: 16 (15 men and 1 woman) in 2 sports
- Flag bearer: Firmin Abissi
- Medals: Gold 0 Silver 0 Bronze 0 Total 0

Summer Olympics appearances (overview)
- 1972; 1976; 1980; 1984; 1988; 1992; 1996; 2000; 2004; 2008; 2012; 2016; 2020; 2024

Benin competed at the 1980 Summer Olympics in Moscow, USSR. The nation returned to the Olympic Games after missing the 1976 Summer Olympics. Benin did not participate in the US-led boycott of the Moscow games and instead sending athletes to compete in Moscow. Previously, the nation competed as Dahomey.

== Athletics ==
Men

Athlete	Event	Heat		Quarterfinal		Semifinal		Final	
Athlete	Event	Result	Rank	Result	Rank	Result	Rank	Result	Rank
Pascal Aho	100 m	11.01	5	did not advance					
Pascal Aho	200 m	22.09	5	did not advance					
Amadou Alimi	5000 m	15:44.0	12	did not advance					
Adam Assimi	800 m	1:59.9	6	did not advance					
Damien Degboe	1500 m	4:15.3	11	did not advance					
Léopold Hounkanrin	400 m	51.04	6	did not advance					

Field events

Athlete	Event	Qualification		Final	
Athlete	Event	Distance	Position	Distance	Position
Henri Dagba	Triple jump	14.71	18	did not advance	
Inoussa Dangou	Javelin Throw	63.56	17	did not advance	
Théophile Hounou	Long jump	7.07	26	did not advance	

Women

Athlete	Event	Heat		Quarterfinal		Semifinal		Final	
Athlete	Event	Result	Rank	Result	Rank	Result	Rank	Result	Rank
Edwige Bancole	100 m	13.19	7	did not advance					

== Boxing ==
Men

Athlete	Event	1 Round	2 Round	3 Round	Quarterfinals	Semifinals	Final
Athlete	Event	Opposition Result	Opposition Result	Opposition Result	Opposition Result	Opposition Result	Rank
Firmin Abissi	Bantamweight	BYE	Ryszard Czerwinski (POL); L KO-1	did not advance			
Barthelémy Adoukonu	Featherweight	BYE	Anicet Sambo (MAD); W DSQ	Tsacho Andreikovski (BUL); L KO-1	did not advance		
Patrice Martin	Lightweight	Yordan Lesov (BUL); L KO-1	did not advance				
Aurelien Agnan	Light-Welterweight	Patrizio Oliva (ITA); L KO-1	did not advance				
Pierre Sotoumey	Welterweight	Andrés Aldama (CUB); L KO-1	did not advance				
Roger Houangni	Light Middleweight	Jackson Rivera (VEN); L K0-5	did not advance				
Étienne Loco Gbodolle	Middleweight	Christer Corpi (SWE); L DSQ	did not advance				
