= Benin at the 2008 Summer Olympics =

- Flag of Benin
- IOC code: BEN
- NOC: Benin National Olympic and Sports Committee
- Website: cnosben.org

in Beijing
- Competitors: 5 in 3 sports
- Flag bearer: Fabienne Feraez
- Medals: Gold 0 Silver 0 Bronze 0 Total 0

Summer Olympics appearances (overview)
- 1972; 1976; 1980; 1984; 1988; 1992; 1996; 2000; 2004; 2008; 2012; 2016; 2020; 2024

Benin took part in the 2008 Summer Olympics which were held in Beijing, China from 8 to 24 August 2008. The country's participation at Beijing marked its eighth consecutive appearance in the summer Olympics since its debut in 1972, and its ninth Olympic appearance ever. (Note: The country's appearance in 1972 was under the name Dahomey.) The Benin delegation included five athletes in 2008, participating in three sports: athletics, swimming and taekwondo. Fabienne Feraez, a sprinter, was selected as the flag bearer for the opening ceremony. None of the Benin athletes progressed further than the heat round.

== Background ==
Benin participated in eight summer Olympic Games between its debut in the 1972 Summer Olympics in Munich and the 2008 Summer Olympics in Beijing. Competing under the name Dahomey, Benin made their Olympic debut in 1972, sending two athletes to the games. The most number of Benin athletes participating in a summer games, is 16 in the 1980 games in Moscow. Five athletes from Benin were selected to compete in the 2008 games: track and field athletes Fabienne Feraez and Mathieu Gnanligo; swimmers Alois Dansou and Gloria Koussihouede; and taekwondo practitioner Jean Moloise Ogoudjobi. Benin was also the first to arrive and raise their flag at the Olympic Village.

== Athletics ==
=== Men's competition ===
A bronze medalist at the 2007 All-Africa Games, Mathieu Gnanligo, participated in the 400 meters. Gnanligo's appearance in Beijing marked his first appearance at any Olympic Games. Once at the Olympics, Gnanligo was placed in the seventh heat on 18 August. He ran a time of 47.10 seconds and finished seventh in the heat against seven other athletes. He finished 49th out of 55 athletes, 6.01 seconds ahead of the slowest athlete Xiaosheng Liu, and 2.31 seconds behind the quickest athlete Chris Brown. He was 1.14 seconds behind Andretti Bain, the slowest athlete who qualified for the semi-finals, and therefore did not progress.

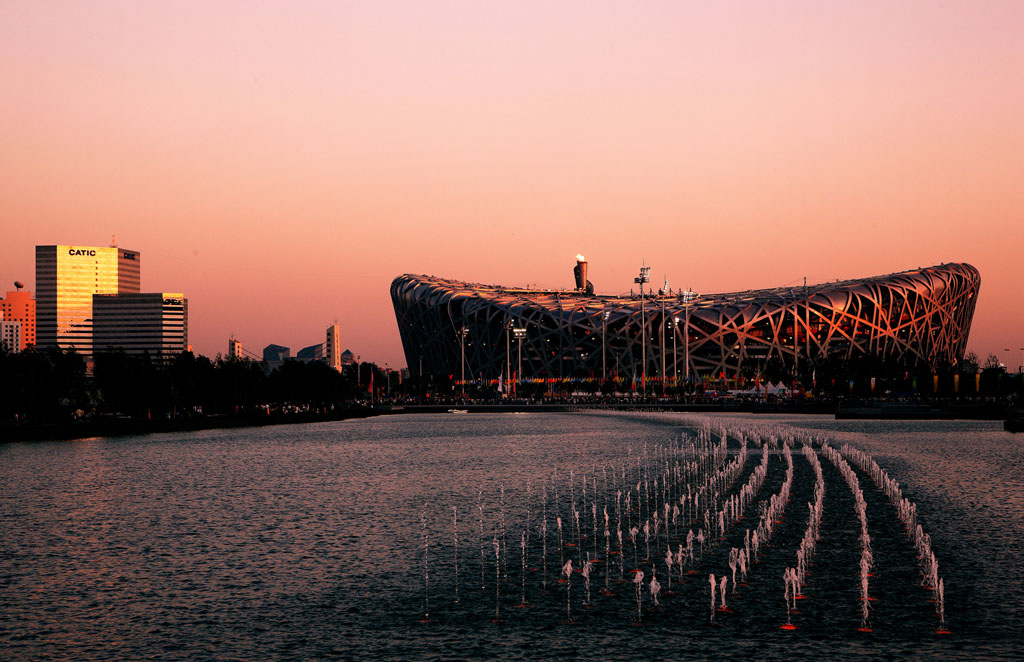
The Beijing National Stadium, where Gnanligo and Feraez competed in track and field events

=== Women's competition ===
Competing at her second Olympics, Fabienne Feraez was the oldest competitor for Benin, aged 32. She competed in the 200 meters on 19 August. Feraez, who also competed in the 2004 Summer Olympics, was drawn into heat three. Feraez ran a time of 24.07 seconds and finished last in her heat, exactly a second behind the winner, Marshevet Myers. She finished 40th out of 46 athletes overall and was 8.09 seconds faster than the slowest athlete, Samia Yusuf Omar. Feraez was 1.36 seconds behind the fastest athlete and 0.48 seconds behind the slowest athlete who progressed to the semi-finals, Eleni Artymata.

Key

- Note–Ranks given for track events are within the athlete's heat only
- Q = Qualified for the next round
- q = Qualified for the next round as a fastest loser or, in field events, by position without achieving the qualifying target
- NR = National record
- N/A = Round not applicable for the event
- Bye = Athlete not required to compete in round

Men

Athlete	Event	Heat		Quarterfinal		Semifinal		Final	
Athlete	Event	Result	Rank	Result	Rank	Result	Rank	Result	Rank
Mathieu Gnanligo	400 m	47.10	7	Did not advance					

Women

Athlete	Event	Heat		Quarterfinal		Semifinal		Final	
Athlete	Event	Result	Rank	Result	Rank	Result	Rank	Result	Rank
Fabienne Feraez	200 m	24.07	8	Did not advance					

== Swimming ==
=== Men's competition ===
Alois Dansou competed in heat one of the 50 meters freestyle on August 14. Dansou also competed in the 2004 Summer Olympics, where he did not progress out of the heats. In 2008 Dansou repeated the result and failed to qualify for the semi-finals. He finished first in his heat in a time of 24.54 seconds, ahead of Omar Jasim and Yasser Núñez. Overall he finished 62nd of 97 competitors and did not qualify for the semi-finals.

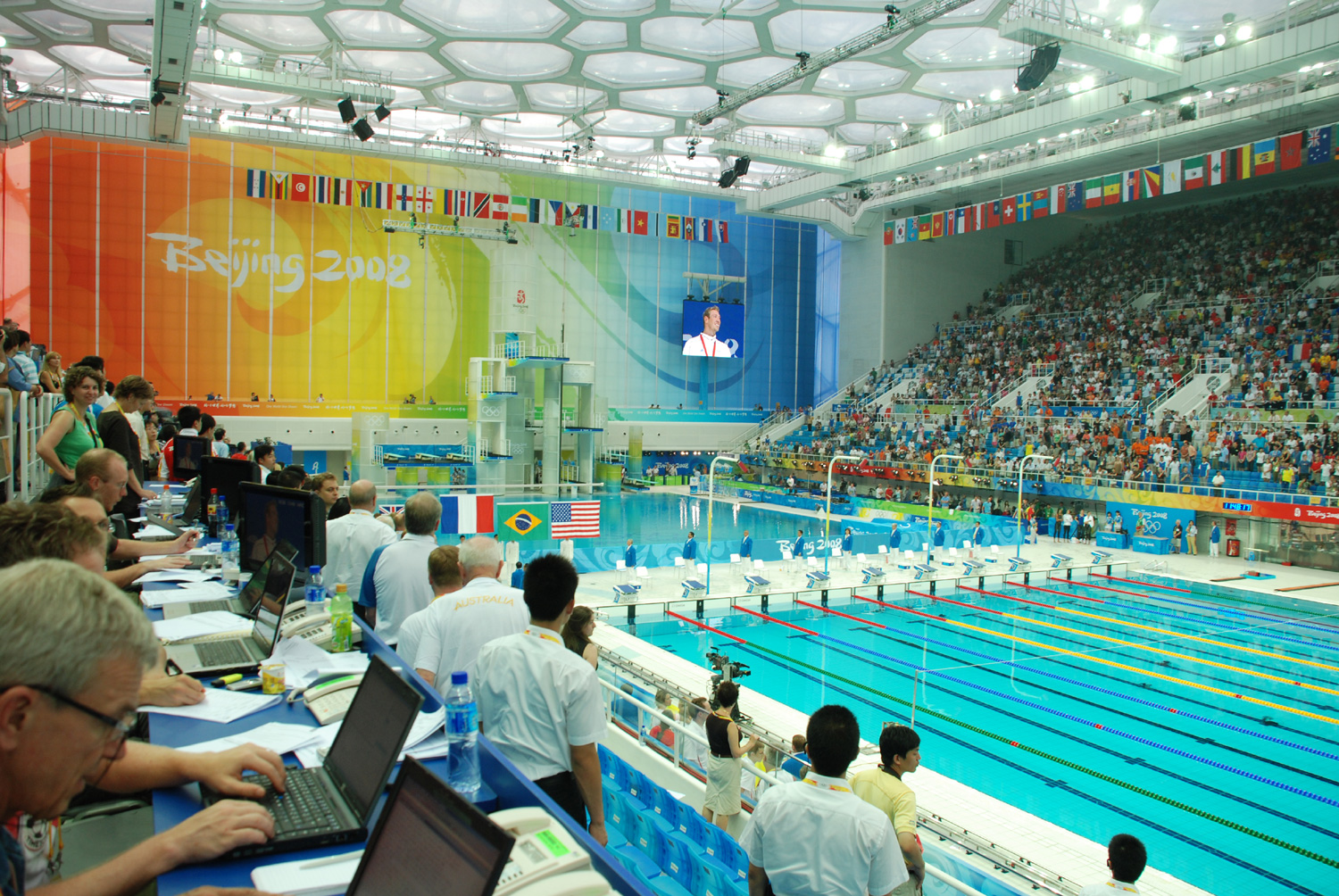
The Beijing National Aquatics Center, where Dansou and Koussihouede competed in swimming events

=== Women's competition ===
Benin had one woman competing in swimming at the 2008 Olympics. That athlete was Gloria Koussihouede who competed in the 50 meters freestyle. The 2008 Olympics was Koussihouedes second Olympics after competing in 2004, and she was selected to compete in heat one. Koussihouede finished second in her heat in a time of 37.09 seconds, behind Sameera Al-Bitar and ahead of Pamela Girimbabazi Rugabira and Djene Barry. Her time placed her 87th out of 90 athletes and she did not qualify for the semi-finals.

Men

Athlete	Event	Heat		Semifinal		Final	
Athlete	Event	Time	Rank	Time	Rank	Time	Rank
Alois Dansou	50 m freestyle	24.54	62	Did not advance			

Women

Athlete	Event	Heat		Semifinal		Final	
Athlete	Event	Time	Rank	Time	Rank	Time	Rank
Gloria Koussihouede	50 m freestyle	37.09	87	Did not advance			

== Taekwondo ==
=== Men's competition ===
Benin had one taekwondo practitioner competing in the 2008 Olympics. This man was Jean Moloise Ogoudjobi, a 28-year-old Beninese athlete, competing at his first Olympic Games. Moloise Ogoudjobi fought in match three against Chutchawal Khawlaor from Thailand in the first round. Moloise Ogoudjobi lost and did not progress to the quarter-finals.

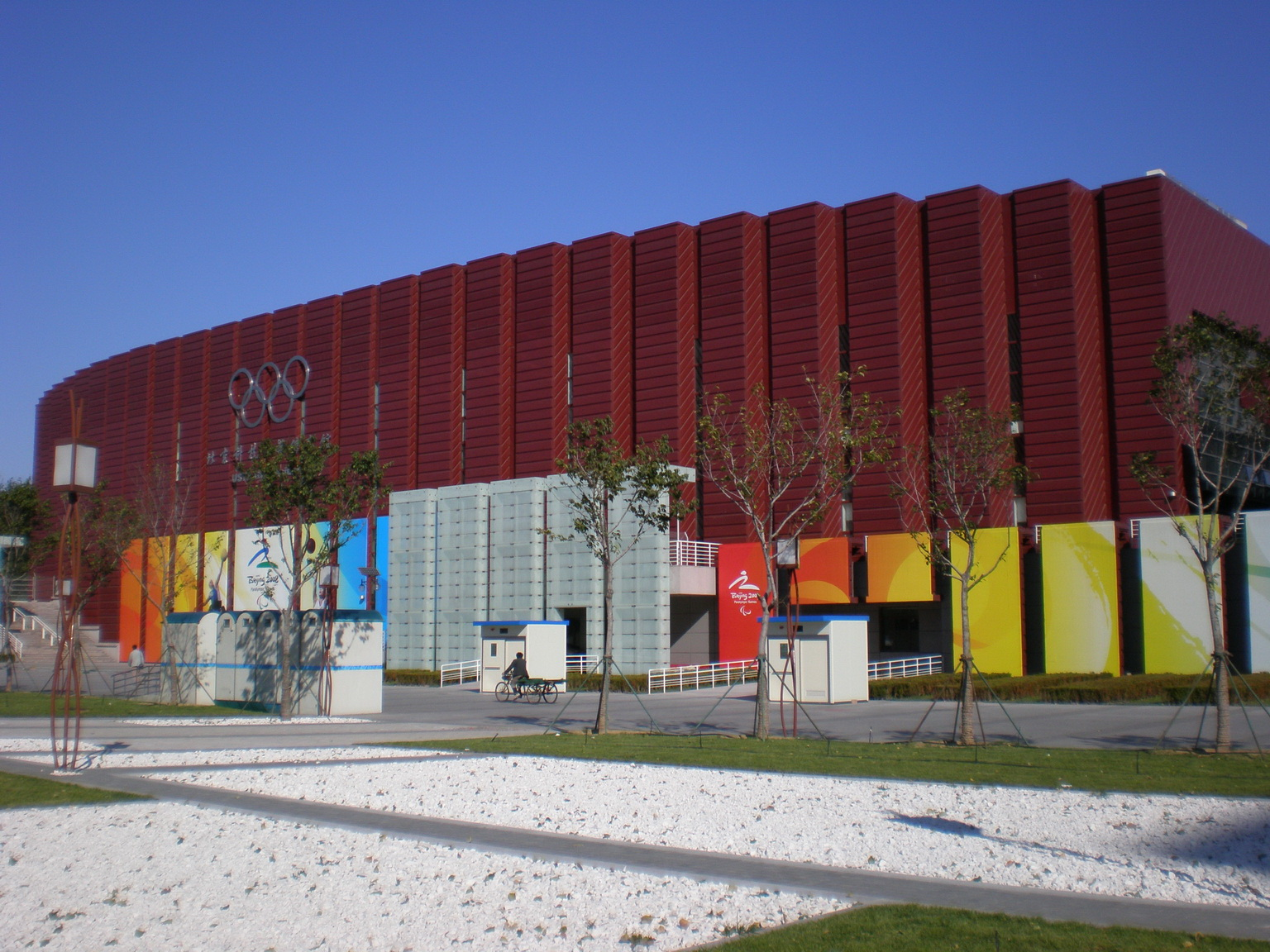
The Beijing Science and Technology University Gymnasium, where Moloise Ogoudjobi competed in taekwondo events

Men

Athlete	Event	Round of 16	Quarterfinals	Semifinals	Repechage	Bronze Medal	Final	
Athlete	Event	Opposition Result	Opposition Result	Opposition Result	Opposition Result	Opposition Result	Opposition Result	Rank
Jean Moloise Ogoudjobi	Men's −58 kg	Khawlaor (THA); L 2–4	Did not advance					

== See also ==
- List of flag bearers for Benin at the Olympics
- Benin National Olympic and Sports Committee
