= Benin at the 2012 Summer Olympics =

- Flag of Benin
- IOC code: BEN
- NOC: Benin National Olympic and Sports Committee
- Website: cnosben.org

in London
- Competitors: 5 in 4 sports
- Flag bearer: Jacob Gnahoui
- Medals: Gold 0 Silver 0 Bronze 0 Total 0

Summer Olympics appearances (overview)
- 1972; 1976; 1980; 1984; 1988; 1992; 1996; 2000; 2004; 2008; 2012; 2016; 2020; 2024

Benin competed at the 2012 Summer Olympics in London, United Kingdom from 27 July to 12 August 2012. This was the nation's tenth appearance at the Olympics, except the 1976 Summer Olympics in Montreal because of the African boycott.

Five athletes from Benin were selected to the team, 4 men and 1 woman, to compete only in athletics, boxing, judo, and swimming. Among the five athletes, track runner Mathieu Gnanligo competed only at his second consecutive Olympics. Judoka Jacob Gnahoui became the nation's first male flag bearer at the opening ceremony since 1984. Benin, however, has yet to win its first Olympic medal.

== Athletics ==
Athletes from Benin have so far achieved qualifying standards in the following athletics events (up to a maximum of 3 athletes in each event at the 'A' Standard, and 1 at the 'B' Standard):

Men

Athlete	Event	Heat		Semifinal		Final	
Athlete	Event	Result	Rank	Result	Rank	Result	Rank
Mathieu Gnanligo	400 m	DNF		Did not advance			

Women

Athlete	Event	Heat		Semifinal		Final	
Athlete	Event	Result	Rank	Result	Rank	Result	Rank
Odile Ahouanwanou	100 m hurdles	14.76	7	Did not advance			

Key

- Note–Ranks given for track events are within the athlete's heat only
- Q = Qualified for the next round
- q = Qualified for the next round as a fastest loser or, in field events, by position without achieving the qualifying target
- NR = National record
- N/A = Round not applicable for the event
- Bye = Athlete not required to compete in round

== Boxing ==
Benin has qualified a boxer for the following event.

Men

Athlete	Event	Round of 32	Round of 16	Quarterfinals	Semifinals	Final	
Athlete	Event	Opposition Result	Opposition Result	Opposition Result	Opposition Result	Opposition Result	Rank
Shafiq Chitou	Lightweight	Mejri (TUN); L 9–16	Did not advance				

== Judo ==
Benin has had 1 judoka invited.

Athlete	Event	Round of 64	Round of 32	Round of 16	Quarterfinals	Semifinals	Repechage	Final / BM	
Athlete	Event	Opposition Result	Opposition Result	Opposition Result	Opposition Result	Opposition Result	Opposition Result	Opposition Result	Rank
Jacob Gnahoui	Men's −60 kg	Paischer (AUT); L 0000–0100	Did not advance						

== Swimming ==
Benin has gained a "Universality place" from the FINA.

Men

Athlete	Event	Heat		Semifinal		Final	
Athlete	Event	Time	Rank	Time	Rank	Time	Rank
Wilfried Tevoedjre	50 m freestyle	29.77	58	Did not advance			
