= Benin at the 1996 Summer Olympics =

- Flag of Benin
- IOC code: BEN
- NOC: Benin National Olympic and Sports Committee
- Website: cnosben.org

in Atlanta
- Competitors: 5 in 1 sport
- Flag bearer: Laure Kuetey
- Medals: Gold 0 Silver 0 Bronze 0 Total 0

Summer Olympics appearances (overview)
- 1972; 1976; 1980; 1984; 1988; 1992; 1996; 2000; 2004; 2008; 2012; 2016; 2020; 2024

Benin competed at the 1996 Summer Olympics in Atlanta, United States.

== Competitors ==
The following is the list of number of competitors in the Games.

Sport	Men	Women	Total
Athletics	4	1	5
Total	4	1	5

== Athletics ==
Men
Track and road events

Athletes	Events	Heat Round 1		Heat Round 2		Semifinal		Final	
Athletes	Events	Time	Rank	Time	Rank	Time	Rank	Time	Rank
Eric Agueh	100 metres	10.98	93	Did not advance					
Pascal Dangbo	200 metres	21.65	68	Did not advance					
Arcadius Fanou; Pascal Dangbo; Issa Alassane-Ousséni; Eric Agueh	4 x 100 metres relay	40.79	27	N/A		Did not advance			

Women
Track and road events

Athletes	Events	Heat Round 1		Heat Round 2		Semifinal		Final	
Athletes	Events	Time	Rank	Time	Rank	Time	Rank	Time	Rank
Laure Kuetey	200 metres	25.57	45	Did not advance					

== Sources ==
- Official Olympic Reports
