= Benin at the 1988 Summer Olympics =

- Flag of Benin
- IOC code: BEN
- NOC: Benin National Olympic and Sports Committee

in Seoul 17 September–2 October 1988
- Competitors: 7 (6 men, 1 woman) in 2 sports
- Flag bearer: Félicite Bada
- Medals: Gold 0 Silver 0 Bronze 0 Total 0

Summer Olympics appearances (overview)
- 1972; 1976; 1980; 1984; 1988; 1992; 1996; 2000; 2004; 2008; 2012; 2016; 2020; 2024

Benin was represented at the 1988 Summer Olympics in Seoul, South Korea by the Benin National Olympic and Sports Committee.

In total, seven athletes including six men and one woman represented Benin in two different sports including athletics and judo.

== Competitors ==
In total, seven athletes represented Benin at the 1988 Summer Olympics in Seoul, South Korea across two different sports.

Sport	Men	Women	Total
Athletics	5	1	6
Judo	1	0	1
Total	6	1	7

== Athletics ==
In total, six Beninoise athletes participated in the athletics events – Issa Alassane-Ousséni, Félicite Bada, Patrice Mahoulikponto, Fortune Ogouchi, José de Souza and Dossou Vignissy.

The heats for the men's 100 m took place on 23 September 1988. Alassane-Ousséni finished third in his heat in a time of 10.72 seconds as he advanced to the quarter-finals. The quarter-finals took place later the same day. Alassane-Ousséni finished eighth in his quarter-final in a time of 10.83 seconds and he did not advance to the semi-finals.

The heats for the women's 100 m took place on 24 September 1988. Baba finished seventh in her heat in a time of 12.27 seconds and she did not advance to the quarter-finals.

The heats for the men's 110 m hurdles took place on 25 September 1988. De Souze finished seventh in his heat in a time of 15.05 seconds and he did not advance to the quarter-finals.

The heats for the men's 200 m took place on 26 September 1988. Alassane-Ousséni finished fourth in his heat in a time of 21.74 seconds and he did not advance to the quarter-finals.

The heats for the women's 200 m took place on 28 September 1988. Baba finished sixth in her heat in a time of 25.42 seconds and she did not advance to the quarter-finals.

The heats for the men's 4 x 100 m relay took place on 30 September 1988. Benin finished fifth in their heat in a time of 41.52 seconds and they did not advance to the semi-finals.

Athlete	Event	Heat		Quarterfinal		Semifinal		Final	
Athlete	Event	Result	Rank	Result	Rank	Result	Rank	Result	Rank
Issa Alassane-Ousséni	Men's 100 m	10.72	3 Q	10.83	8	Did not advance			
Issa Alassane-Ousséni	Men's 200 m	21.74	4	Did not advance					
José de Souza	Men's 110 m hurdles	15.05	7	Did not advance					
Fortune Ogouchi; Patrice Mahoulikponto; Dossou Vignissy; Issa Alassane-Ousséni	Men's 4 × 100 m relay	41.52	5	—N/a		Did not advance			
Félicite Bada	Women's 100 m	12.27	7	Did not advance					
Félicite Bada	Women's 200 m	25.42	6	Did not advance					

== Judo ==
In total, one Beninoise athlete participated in the judo events – Daniel Dohou Dossou in the men's −71 kg category.

The men's −71 kg category took place on 27 September 1988. Dossou received a bye in the first round. In the second round, he lost by ippon to Steffen Stranz of West Germany.

Athlete	Event	Preliminary	Round of 32	Round of 16	Quarterfinals	Semifinals	Repechage 1	Repechage 2	Repechage 3	Repechage Final	Final / BM	
Athlete	Event	Opposition Result	Opposition Result	Opposition Result	Opposition Result	Opposition Result	Opposition Result	Opposition Result	Opposition Result	Opposition Result	Opposition Result	Rank
Daniel Dohou Dossou	−71 kg	BYE	Stranz (FRG); L 0000-1000	Did not advance								
