= Benin at the 2000 Summer Olympics =

- Flag of Benin
- IOC code: BEN
- NOC: Benin National Olympic and Sports Committee
- Website: cnosben.org

in Sydney
- Competitors: 4 in 3 sports
- Flag bearer: Laure Kuetey
- Medals: Gold 0 Silver 0 Bronze 0 Total 0

Summer Olympics appearances (overview)
- 1972; 1976; 1980; 1984; 1988; 1992; 1996; 2000; 2004; 2008; 2012; 2016; 2020; 2024

Benin competed at the 2000 Summer Olympics in Sydney, Australia.

== Competitors ==
The following is the list of number of competitors in the Games.

Sport	Men	Women	Total
Athletics	1	1	2
Taekwondo	1	0	1
Tennis	1	0	1
Total	3	1	4

== Athletics ==
Men

Athlete	Event	Heat		Quarterfinal		Semifinal		Final	
Athlete	Event	Result	Rank	Result	Rank	Result	Rank	Result	Rank
Pascal Dangbo	200 m	21.54	58	did not advance					

Women

Athlete	Event	Heat		Quarterfinal		Semifinal		Final	
Athlete	Event	Result	Rank	Result	Rank	Result	Rank	Result	Rank
Laure Kuetey	100 m	12.40	65	did not advance					

== Taekwondo ==
Men's

Athlete	Event	Round of 16	Quarterfinals	Semifinals	Repechage	Bronze Medal	Final	
Athlete	Event	Opposition Result	Opposition Result	Opposition Result	Opposition Result	Opposition Result	Opposition Result	Rank
Stanislas Ogoudjobi	Men's −68 kg	Acharki (GER); L 0-7	did not advance					

== Tennis ==
Women

Athlete	Event	Round of 64	Round of 32	Round of 16	Quarterfinals	Semifinals	Final	
Athlete	Event	Opposition Score	Opposition Score	Opposition Score	Opposition Score	Opposition Score	Opposition Score	Rank
Christophe Pognon	Singles	Gustavo Kuerten (BRA); L 1–6, 1-6	did not advance					

== See also ==
- Benin at the 2000 Summer Paralympics
