= Dansou =

Dansou is a surname. Notable people with the surname include:

- Alois Dansou (born 1982), Beninese swimmer
- Marc Dansou (born 1983), Beninese swimmer
