= Athletics at the 2004 Summer Olympics – Women's 200 metres =

Women's 200 metres at the Games of the XXVIII Olympiad
- Olympic Athletics
- Venue: Athens Olympic Stadium
- Date: 23–25 August
- Competitors: 44 from 32 nations
- Winning time: 22.05

Medalists
| 1st place, gold medalist(s) | | Veronica Campbell | Jamaica |
| 2nd place, silver medalist(s) | | Allyson Felix | United States |
| 3rd place, bronze medalist(s) | | Debbie Ferguson | Bahamas |

The women's 200 metres at the 2004 Summer Olympics as part of the athletics program were held at the Athens Olympic Stadium from August 24 to 26. The winning margin was 0.13 seconds. The winner had the second slowest reaction time in the final.

The top four runners in each of the initial seven heats automatically qualified for the second round. The next four fastest runners from across the heats also qualified. Those 32 runners competed in four heats in the second round, with the top three from each heat and the four next fastest overall advancing to the semifinals. In two semifinal heats, only the top four runners from each heat moved on to the final.

Leading up to the Olympic final, Jamaica's Veronica Campbell was considered a pre-race favorite of this event, as she had previously managed to beat her own world leading time in the semifinals. She was also expected to challenge the youngster Allyson Felix, who had quickly become the top medal contender for the Americans. From the blocks, Campbell took a commanding lead with a strong curve and kept her form in the last few strides of the track to hold off a charge from Felix for the Olympic title at 22.05 seconds. Felix closed the race quickly to get the silver medal and set the world junior record. On the outside, Bahamian sprinter Debbie Ferguson was immediately chased by Campbell's teammate Aleen Bailey, but the places were clearly decided.

== Records ==
Prior to the competition, the existing World record, Olympic record, and world leading time were as follows:

| World record | Florence Griffith-Joyner (USA) | 21.34 s | Seoul, South Korea | 29 September 1988 |
| Olympic record | Florence Griffith-Joyner (USA) | 21.34 s | Seoul, South Korea | 29 September 1988 |
| World Leading | Veronica Campbell-Brown (JAM) | 22.18 s | Kingston, Jamaica | 27 June 2004 |

No new records were set during the competition.

== Qualification ==
The qualification period for athletics took place from 1 January 2003 to 9 August 2004. For the women's 200 metres, each National Olympic Committee was permitted to enter up to three athletes that had run the race in 22.97 seconds or faster during the qualification period. If an NOC had no athletes that qualified under that standard, one athlete that had run the race in 23.12 seconds or faster could be entered.

== Schedule ==
All times are Eastern European Summer Time (UTC+3)

| Date | Time | Round |
|---|---|---|
| Monday, 23 August 2004 | 11:00; 20:25 | Round 1 Quarterfinals |
| Tuesday, 24 August 2004 | 22:05 | Semifinals |
| Wednesday, 25 August 2004 | 23:20 | Final |

== Results ==
=== Round 1 ===
Qualification rule: The first four finishers in each heat (Q) plus the next four fastest overall runners (q) qualified.

==== Heat 1 ====
Wind: +0.4 m/s

| Rank | Lane | Name | Nationality | Reaction | Result | Notes |
|---|---|---|---|---|---|---|
| 1 | 7 | Veronica Campbell | Jamaica | 0.252 | 22.59 | Q |
| 2 | 6 | Alenka Bikar | Slovenia | 0.217 | 23.09 | Q |
| 3 | 3 | La Shauntea Moore | United States | 0.253 | 23.10 | Q |
| 4 | 4 | Lucimar de Moura | Brazil | 0.211 | 23.40 | Q |
| 5 | 2 | Heide Seyerling | South Africa | 0.187 | 23.66 | |
| 6 | 5 | Monika Gachevska | Bulgaria | 0.175 | 23.71 | |

==== Heat 2 ====
Wind: +1.7 m/s

| Rank | Lane | Name | Nationality | Reaction | Result | Notes |
|---|---|---|---|---|---|---|
| 1 | 3 | Ivet Lalova | Bulgaria | 0.168 | 22.88 | Q |
| 2 | 5 | Sylviane Félix | France | 0.295 | 22.94 | Q |
| 3 | 6 | Yekaterina Kondratyeva | Russia | 0.225 | 23.03 | Q |
| 4 | 2 | Natallia Safronnikava | Belarus | 0.167 | 23.28 | Q |
| 5 | 4 | Lyubov Perepelova | Uzbekistan | 0.306 | 24.10 | |
| 6 | 7 | Gretta Taslakian | Lebanon | 0.260 | 24.30 | NR |

==== Heat 3 ====
Wind: +1.6 m/s

| Rank | Lane | Name | Nationality | Reaction | Result | Notes |
|---|---|---|---|---|---|---|
| 1 | 5 | Cydonie Mothersille | Cayman Islands | 0.266 | 22.40 | Q, NR |
| 2 | 6 | Beverly McDonald | Jamaica | 0.191 | 22.90 | Q |
| 3 | 7 | Yelena Bolsun | Russia | 0.262 | 23.00 | Q |
| 4 | 3 | Joice Maduaka | Great Britain | 0.172 | 23.15 | Q |
| 5 | 4 | Saraswati Saha | India | 0.275 | 23.43 | |
| 6 | 2 | Gcinile Moyane | Swaziland | 0.230 | 25.62 | NR |

==== Heat 4 ====
Wind: +2.0 m/s

| Rank | Lane | Name | Nationality | Reaction | Result | Notes |
|---|---|---|---|---|---|---|
| 1 | 2 | Allyson Felix | United States | 0.212 | 22.39 | Q |
| 2 | 5 | Abi Oyepitan | Great Britain | 0.180 | 22.50 | Q, PB |
| 3 | 7 | Maryna Maydanova | Ukraine | 0.265 | 22.76 | Q, SB |
| 4 | 3 | Muriel Hurtis | France | 0.217 | 22.77 | Q, SB |
| 5 | 4 | Karin Mayr-Krifka | Austria | 0.189 | 22.81 | q, SB |
| 6 | 6 | Mary Onyali-Omagbemi | Nigeria | 0.237 | 23.37 | q |
| 7 | 8 | Gladys Thompson | Liberia | 0.281 | 27.51 | |

==== Heat 5 ====
Wind: +2.1 m/s

| Rank | Lane | Name | Nationality | Reaction | Result | Notes |
|---|---|---|---|---|---|---|
| 1 | 4 | Muna Lee | United States | 0.197 | 22.57 | Q |
| 2 | 2 | Tatyana Levina | Russia | 0.187 | 23.05 | Q |
| 3 | 5 | La Verne Jones | Virgin Islands | 0.239 | 23.20 | Q |
| 4 | 3 | Marilia Gregoriou | Cyprus | 0.192 | 23.23 | Q |
| 5 | 6 | Emma Wade | Belize | 0.206 | 23.43 | |
| 6 | 7 | Michelle Banga Moudzoula | Republic of the Congo | 0.247 | 24.37 | |

==== Heat 6 ====
Wind: −0.2 m/s

| Rank | Lane | Name | Nationality | Reaction | Result | Notes |
|---|---|---|---|---|---|---|
| 1 | 2 | Aleen Bailey | Jamaica | 0.218 | 22.73 | Q |
| 2 | 7 | Kim Gevaert | Belgium | 0.187 | 22.76 | Q |
| 3 | 6 | Olga Kaidantzi | Greece | 0.284 | 23.11 | Q |
| 4 | 3 | Fabienne Feraez | Benin | 0.181 | 23.12 | Q, =NR |
| 5 | 4 | Johanna Manninen | Finland | 0.166 | 23.45 | SB |
| 6 | 5 | Kadiatou Camara | Mali | 0.287 | 23.56 | |

==== Heat 7 ====
Wind: +1.4 m/s

| Rank | Lane | Name | Nationality | Reaction | Result | Notes |
|---|---|---|---|---|---|---|
| 1 | 2 | Debbie Ferguson | Bahamas | 0.171 | 22.57 | Q, SB |
| 2 | 7 | Christine Arron | France | 0.252 | 22.60 | Q, SB |
| 3 | 6 | Merlene Ottey | Slovenia | 0.254 | 22.72 | Q, NR |
| 4 | 4 | Lauren Hewitt | Australia | 0.165 | 22.87 | Q, SB |
| 5 | 3 | Digna Murillo | Colombia | 0.149 | 22.98 | q, PB |
| 6 | 5 | Anna Pacholak | Poland | 0.283 | 23.00 | q, SB |

=== Round 2 ===
Qualification rule: The first three finishers in each heat (Q) plus the next four fastest overall runners (q) advanced to the semifinals.

==== Heat 1 ====
Wind: +0.4 m/s

| Rank | Lane | Name | Nationality | Reaction | Result | Notes |
|---|---|---|---|---|---|---|
| 1 | 6 | Veronica Campbell | Jamaica | 0.182 | 22.49 | Q |
| 2 | 4 | Debbie Ferguson | Bahamas | 0.175 | 22.53 | Q, SB |
| 3 | 3 | Kim Gevaert | Belgium | 0.169 | 22.68 | Q |
| 4 | 8 | La Shauntea Moore | United States | 0.306 | 22.96 | q |
| 5 | 5 | Sylviane Félix | France | 0.217 | 23.08 | q |
| 6 | 1 | La Verne Jones | Virgin Islands | 0.188 | 23.09 | |
| 7 | 7 | Karin Mayr-Krifka | Austria | 0.239 | 23.19 | |
| 8 | 2 | Lucimar de Moura | Brazil | 0.165 | 23.44 | |

==== Heat 2 ====
Wind: +0.4 m/s

| Rank | Lane | Name | Nationality | Reaction | Result | Notes |
|---|---|---|---|---|---|---|
| 1 | 4 | Muna Lee | United States | 0.239 | 22.74 | Q |
| 2 | 3 | Aleen Bailey | Jamaica | 0.227 | 22.97 | Q |
| 3 | 8 | Olga Kaidantzi | Greece | 0.235 | 23.15 | Q |
| 4 | 1 | Digna Murillo | Colombia | 0.189 | 23.19 | |
| 5 | 5 | Tatyana Levina | Russia | 0.177 | 23.23 | |
| 6 | 7 | Muriel Hurtis | France | 0.224 | 23.33 | |
| 7 | 6 | Alenka Bikar | Slovenia | 0.163 | 23.38 | |
| 8 | 2 | Natallia Safronnikava | Belarus | 0.184 | 23.63 | |

==== Heat 3 ====
Wind: +0.2 m/s

| Rank | Lane | Name | Nationality | Reaction | Result | Notes |
|---|---|---|---|---|---|---|
| 1 | 4 | Allyson Felix | United States | 0.196 | 22.69 | Q |
| 2 | 3 | Abi Oyepitan | Great Britain | 0.168 | 22.79 | Q |
| 3 | 6 | Maryna Maydanova | Ukraine | 0.225 | 22.86 | Q |
| 4 | 5 | Christine Arron | France | 0.278 | 22.90 | q |
| 5 | 2 | Fabienne Feraez | Benin | 0.213 | 23.24 | |
| 6 | 1 | Yelena Bolsun | Russia | 0.158 | 23.26 | |
| 7 | 8 | Marilia Gregoriou | Cyprus | 0.228 | 23.65 | |
| 8 | 7 | Mary Onyali-Omagbemi | Nigeria | 0.245 | 23.75 | |

==== Heat 4 ====
Wind: −0.1 m/s

| Rank | Lane | Name | Nationality | Reaction | Result | Notes |
|---|---|---|---|---|---|---|
| 1 | 4 | Cydonie Mothersille | Cayman Islands | 0.212 | 22.76 | Q |
| 2 | 3 | Ivet Lalova | Bulgaria | 0.128 | 22.81 | Q |
| 3 | 5 | Beverly McDonald | Jamaica | 0.201 | 22.99 | Q |
| 4 | 6 | Merlene Ottey | Slovenia | 0.292 | 23.07 | q |
| 5 | 8 | Joice Maduaka | Great Britain | 0.219 | 23.30 | |
| 6 | 7 | Anna Pacholak | Poland | 0.247 | 23.35 | |
| 7 | 1 | Yekaterina Kondratyeva | Russia | 0.188 | 23.37 | |
| 8 | 2 | Lauren Hewitt | Australia | 0.149 | 23.44 | |

=== Semifinals ===
Qualification rule: The first four finishers in each heat (Q) moved on to the final.

==== Semifinal 1 ====
Wind: +0.5 m/s

| Rank | Lane | Name | Nationality | Reaction | Result | Notes |
|---|---|---|---|---|---|---|
| 1 | 3 | Allyson Felix | United States | 0.198 | 22.36 | Q |
| 2 | 5 | Abi Oyepitan | Great Britain | 0.125 | 22.56 | Q |
| 3 | 4 | Ivet Lalova | Bulgaria | 0.160 | 22.56 | Q, SB |
| 4 | 6 | Muna Lee | United States | 0.173 | 22.69 | Q |
| 5 | 8 | Maryna Maydanova | Ukraine | 0.219 | 22.75 | |
| 6 | 1 | Beverly McDonald | Jamaica | 0.172 | 23.02 | |
| 7 | 2 | Christine Arron | France | 0.184 | 23.05 | |
| | 7 | Merlene Ottey | Slovenia | 0.247 | DNF | |

==== Semifinal 2 ====
Wind: +1.1 m/s

| Rank | Lane | Name | Nationality | Reaction | Result | Notes |
|---|---|---|---|---|---|---|
| 1 | 5 | Veronica Campbell | Jamaica | 0.160 | 22.13 | Q, PB |
| 2 | 6 | Aleen Bailey | Jamaica | 0.283 | 22.33 | Q, PB |
| 3 | 2 | Kim Gevaert | Belgium | 0.154 | 22.48 | Q, NR |
| 4 | 4 | Debbie Ferguson | Bahamas | 0.177 | 22.49 | Q, SB |
| 5 | 3 | Cydonie Mothersille | Cayman Islands | 0.297 | 22.76 | |
| 6 | 8 | La Shauntea Moore | United States | 0.346 | 22.93 | |
| 7 | 1 | Sylviane Félix | France | 0.222 | 22.99 | |
| 8 | 7 | Olga Kaidantzi | Greece | 0.225 | 23.30 | |

=== Final ===
Wind: +0.8 m/s

| Rank | Lane | Name | Nationality | Reaction | Result | Notes |
|---|---|---|---|---|---|---|
| 1st place, gold medalist(s) | 4 | Veronica Campbell | Jamaica | 0.216 | 22.05 | PB |
| 2nd place, silver medalist(s) | 3 | Allyson Felix | United States | 0.207 | 22.18 | WJR |
| 3rd place, bronze medalist(s) | 8 | Debbie Ferguson | Bahamas | 0.193 | 22.30 | SB |
| 4 | 6 | Aleen Bailey | Jamaica | 0.208 | 22.42 | |
| 5 | 2 | Ivet Lalova | Bulgaria | 0.162 | 22.57 | |
| 6 | 1 | Kim Gevaert | Belgium | 0.172 | 22.84 | |
| 7 | 7 | Muna Lee | United States | 0.178 | 22.87 | |
| 7 | 5 | Abi Oyepitan | Great Britain | 0.259 | 22.87 | |
