= Yémi Apithy =

French-Beninese sabre fencer (born 1989)

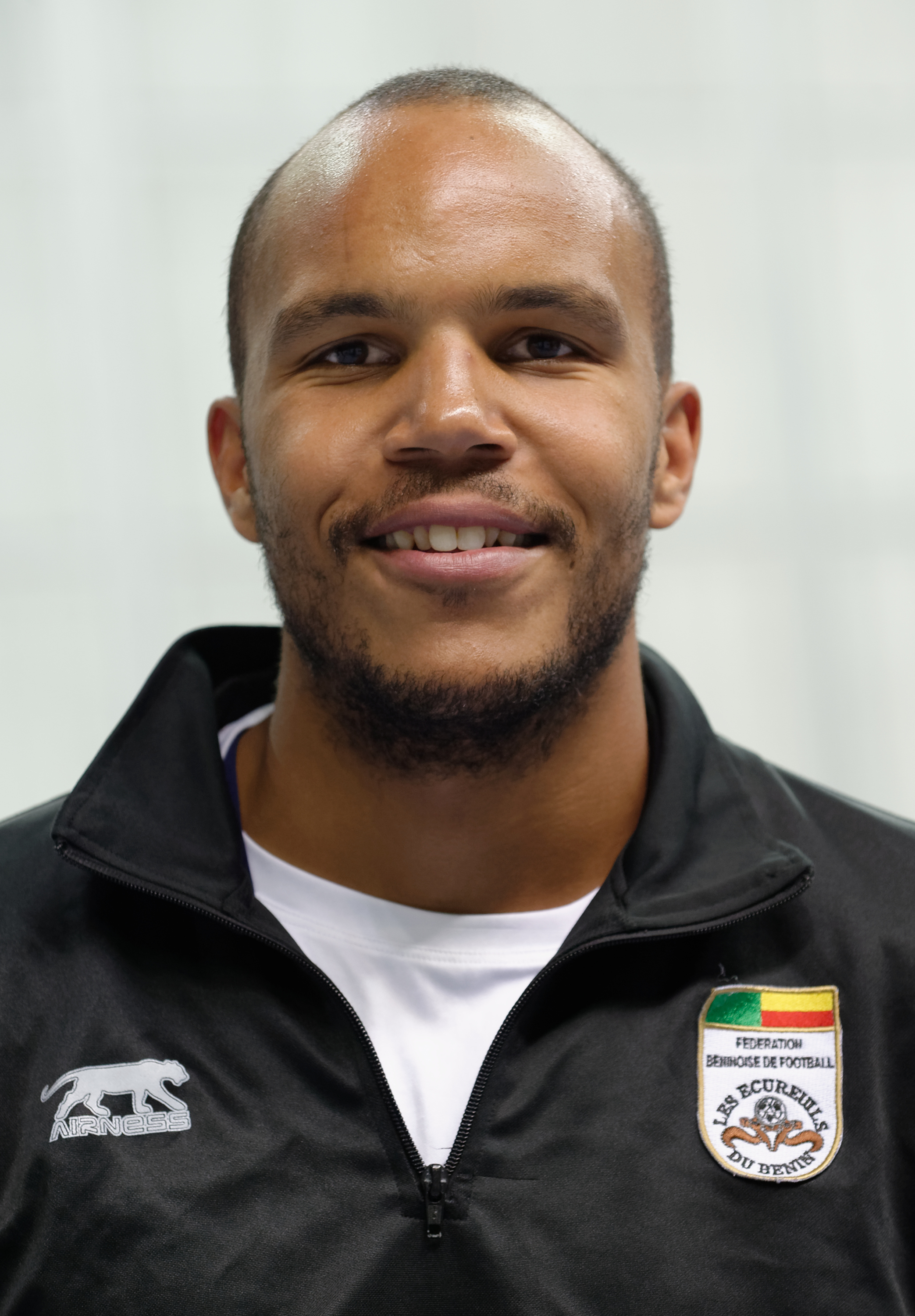

Personal information
- Born: 5 April 1989 (age 37) Dijon, France
- Height: 1.92 m (6 ft 4 in)
- Weight: 96 kg (212 lb; 15.1 st)

Fencing career
- Sport: Fencing
- Country: Benin
- Weapon: sabre
- Hand: right-handed
- Club: ASPTT Dijon
- Head coach: Jean-Pierre Harbelot
- FIE ranking: current ranking

Yémi Geoffrey Apithy (born 5 April 1989) is a French-Beninese sabre fencer representing Benin in international competitions, silver medalist at the 2014 and 2015 African Championships. He bore the flag for Benin at the 2016 Summer Olympics.

== Career ==
Apithy holds dual French-Beninese citizenship: his father is from Benin, whilst his mother is French. He took up fencing as a child, following the path of his elder brother Boladé, who would become world silver medalist in sabre. He also practiced rugby union before his father made him choose between the two sports.

Both brothers trained at the fencing club ASPTT Dijon. Yémi earned a bronze medal in the U13 national championships and then became a national champion in the cadet (U17) category. He joined the junior national team for the 2007 Junior European Championships in Prague, where France ranked 4 in the team event. However, he was not chosen for the senior team and gave up competition to focus on his podiatry studies in Belgium. He reconsidered his decision after talking to the president of the freshly created Beninese Fencing Federation.

In the 2010–2011 season, he won the team event at the French national championships together with his brother and Nicolas Rousset. That same year, he became the first fencer from Benin to take part in the World Fencing Championships. He qualified to the final table of 64 but was eliminated by future Olympic champion Áron Szilágyi. The next season, he failed to qualify for the 2012 Summer Olympics after he was defeated by Mamadou Keita in the semifinals of the Casablanca pre-Olympic tournament.

In the 2013-14 season he won a silver medal at the 2014 African Fencing Championships after losing in the final to Egypt's Ziad Elsissy. The same scenario played out in 2014, when he was eliminated in the final by another Egyptian, Mohamed Amer. At the 2015 World Fencing Championships, he reached the last 64 again before losing to Iran's Mojtaba Abedini.

In March 2016, he qualified to the 2016 Summer Olympics as one of the two highest-ranked fencers from Africa. He bore the flag of Benin at the opening ceremony and became the first Olympic fencer from his country. In the men's sabre event he lost in the first round to Germany's Max Hartung.

Olympic Games
Preceded by Jacob Gnahoui	Flagbearer for Benin; 2016 Rio de Janeiro	Succeeded by Nafissath Radji; Privel Hinkati
