= Benin at the 2016 Summer Olympics =

- Flag of Benin
- IOC code: BEN
- NOC: Benin National Olympic and Sports Committee
- Website: cnosben.org

in Rio de Janeiro
- Competitors: 6 in 4 sports
- Flag bearer: Yémi Apithy
- Medals: Gold 0 Silver 0 Bronze 0 Total 0

Summer Olympics appearances (overview)
- 1972; 1976; 1980; 1984; 1988; 1992; 1996; 2000; 2004; 2008; 2012; 2016; 2020; 2024

Benin competed at the 2016 Summer Olympics in Rio de Janeiro, Brazil, from 5 to 21 August 2016. This was the nation's eleventh appearance at the Summer Olympics, with the exception of the 1976 Summer Olympics in Montreal because of the African boycott.

Benin National Olympic and Sports Committee selected a team of six athletes, four men and two women, for the Games, competing in athletics, fencing, judo, and swimming. All of them made their maiden Olympic appearance, with sabre fencer Yémi Apithy leading the Benin team as the nation's flag bearer in the opening ceremony. Benin, however, has yet to win its first Olympic medal.

== Athletics (track and field) ==
Benin athletes achieved qualifying standards in the following athletics events (up to a maximum of 3 athletes in each event):

Key

- Note–Ranks given for track events are within the athlete's heat only
- Q = Qualified for the next round
- q = Qualified for the next round as a fastest loser or, in field events, by position without achieving the qualifying target
- NR = National record
- N/A = Round not applicable for the event
- Bye = Athlete not required to compete in round

Track & road events

Athlete	Event	Heat		Semifinal		Final	
Athlete	Event	Result	Rank	Result	Rank	Result	Rank
Didier Kiki	Men's 200 m	22.27	7	Did not advance			
Noélie Yarigo	Women's 800 m	1:59.12	4 q	1:59.78	5	Did not advance	

== Fencing ==
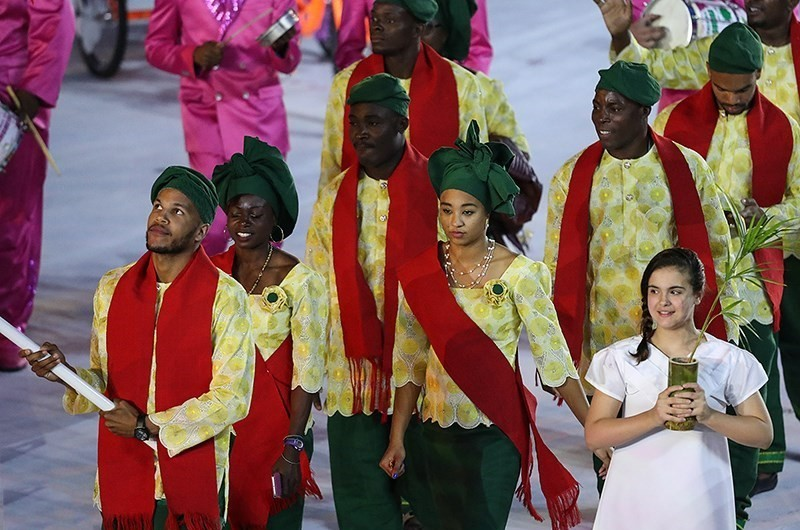
Sabre fencer Yémi Apithy led the Benin team in the opening ceremony.

Following the completion of the Grand Prix finals, Benin has entered one fencer into the Olympic competition. Yémi Apithy claimed an Olympic spot in the men's sabre as one of the two highest-ranked fencers from Africa outside the world's top 14 in the FIE Adjusted Official Rankings, signifying the country's debut in the sport.

Athlete	Event	Round of 32	Round of 16	Quarterfinal	Semifinal	Final / BM	
Athlete	Event	Opposition Score	Opposition Score	Opposition Score	Opposition Score	Opposition Score	Rank
Yémi Apithy	Men's sabre	Hartung (GER); L 9–15	Did not advance				

== Judo ==
Benin qualified one judoka for the men's middleweight category (90 kg) at the Games. Celtus Dossou Yovo earned a continental quota spot from the African region as Benin's top-ranked judoka outside of direct qualifying position in the IJF World Ranking List of 30 May 2016.

Athlete	Event	Round of 64	Round of 32	Round of 16	Quarterfinals	Semifinals	Repechage	Final / BM	
Athlete	Event	Opposition Result	Opposition Result	Opposition Result	Opposition Result	Opposition Result	Opposition Result	Opposition Result	Rank
Celtus Dossou Yovo	Men's −90 kg	Bye	Dias (POR); W 100–001	Nyman (SWE); L 000–100	Did not advance				

== Swimming ==
Benin received universality invitations from FINA to send two swimmers (one male and one female).

Athlete	Event	Heat		Semifinal		Final	
Athlete	Event	Time	Rank	Time	Rank	Time	Rank
Jules Bessan	Men's 50 m freestyle	27.32	77	Did not advance			
Laraïba Seibou	Women's 50 m freestyle	33.01	77	Did not advance			
