= Félicite Bada =

Beninese sprinter

Personal information
- Born: 14 March 1962 (age 64)

Sport
- Sport: Track and field

Félicite Bada (born 14 March 1962) is a Beninese sprinter who specializes in the 100 meters and 200 meters events. She competed in Athletics at the 1987 All-Africa Games in August 1987, in which she ran a personal best time of 25.08 seconds in the 200 metres. At Seoul, she participated at the 1988 Summer Olympics, where she was the flag bearer for Benin. Though she only finished 7th in Heat 1 of the 100 metres, she still ran a personal best time of 12.27 seconds.

== Career ==
Her career was at its peak in the late 1980s. She set her personal best of 25.08 seconds in the 200 metres on 11 August 1987 in Nairobi at the All-Africa Games, though she only finished eighth in the quarter-finals.

Bada qualified for the 1988 Summer Olympics in Seoul, and was the flag bearer for her country. She was one of eight athletes to qualify for the Olympics that year from Benin, the others being judoka Daniel Dohoua Dossou, and athletes Issa Alassane-Ousséni in the 100 metres, José de Souza in the 110 m hurdles, and 4 x 100 relay sprinters Fortune Ogouchi, Patrice Mahoulikponto, Dossou Vignissy and Issa Alassane-Ousséni. In the Women's 100 metre event, Bada finished 7th in Heat 1, failing to qualify, but still running a personal best time of 12.27 seconds. In the Women's 200 metre event she finished 6th in Heat 1 with a time of 25:42 seconds, again failing to proceed.

Bada is listed at 5 ft 4 inches tall (163 cm) and her weight during her career is cited at 121 pounds or 55 kilograms.

Olympic Games
| Preceded by Firmin Abissi | Flagbearer for Benin; 1988 Seoul | Succeeded by Sonya Agbéssi |
