= List of Beninese records in athletics =

The following are the records by Benin in athletics recognised by the Fédération Béninoise d'Athlétisme (FBA).

== Outdoor ==
Key to tables: Awaiting ratification Record not kept by FBA Not ratified or later rescinded by FBA

=== Men ===
Event	Record	Athlete	Date	Meet	Place	Ref.
100 m	10.31 (+1.1 m/s)	Souhalia Alamou	5 June 2004	International Meeting	Lugano, Switzerland	
100 m	10.25 (+1.9 m/s)	William Aguessy	1 June 2024		Limoges, France	
200 m	20.95 NWI	Souhalia Alamou	16 May 2004		Cotonou, Benin	
400 m	45.82	Mathieu Gnanligo	29 June 2012	African Championships	Porto-Novo, Benin	
800 m	1:50.89	Akim Balogoun	21 May 1999		Lagos, Nigeria	
1500 m	3:54.12	Ibrahim Ofangobi	16 May 2004		Cotonou, Benin	
1500 m	3:54.08 (Note: by World Athletics Profile; 3:54.1 h by World Athletics Statistic Handbook)	Sylvain Azonhin	29 May 2021		Zaria, Nigeria	
3000 m	8:38.53	Imorou Zato	22 August 1998	African Championships	Dakar, Senegal	
5000 m	14:49.1 h	Imorou Zato	31 May 1998		Niamey, Niger	
10,000 m	31:24.6 h	Imorou Zato	18 July 1997		Cotonou, Benin	
Half marathon	1:09:44	Paulin Agbodji	22 February 2003		Dakar, Senegal	
Marathon	2:24:53	Patrice Lompo	11 February 2012		Parakou, Benin	
Marathon	2:24:50	Daouda Korongou	11 February 2017		Parakou, Benin	
110 m hurdles	14.68 NWI	Brice de Souza	25 June 1988		Narbonne, France	
400 m hurdles	50.48 (Note: Best performance with electronic timing.)	Abdoulaye Chérif Issa	25 April 2006		Ouagadougou, Burkina Faso	
400 m hurdles	49.97 (Note: 50.0 with manual timing according to World Athletics, who does not consider the performance record eligible.)	Abdoulaye Chérif Issa	24 April 2007		Ouagadougou, Burkina Faso	
3000 m steeplechase	9:21.21	Mahomet Adam	29 June 2012	African Championships	Porto-Novo, Benin	
High jump	2.12 m	Romain Akpo	10 September 2010	1st U-23ECOWAS Games	Abuja, Nigeria	
Pole vault	3.50 m	John Godonou-Dossou	30 June 1957		Dakar, French West Africa	
Long jump	7.97 m NWI	Romeo N'tia	15 July 2018		Porto-Novo, Benin	
Triple jump	15.70 m	Armand Gbaguidi	29 March 1987		Cotonou, Benin	
Shot put	15.90 m	Romainio Houndéladji	22 May 2009		Porto-Novo, Benin	
Discus throw	43.26 m	Romainio Houndéladji	27 December 2015		Porto-Novo, Benin	
Hammer throw	21.44 m	Chakirou-Alabi Danialou	17 May 2009		Saint-Quentin, France	
Javelin throw	60.33 m	Romaric Houénou	21 July 2019		Niamey, Niger	
Javelin throw	61.57 m	Dalil Chablis	18 June 2023		Pontoise, France	
Javelin throw	64.95 m	Romaric Huoénou	4 August 2023	Jeux de la Francophonie	Kinshasa, Democratic Republic of the Congo	
Decathlon	4442 pts h	Laurent Tchankpéga	14–15 October 1978		Nevers, France	
Decathlon	100m / Long jump / Shot put / High jump / 400m / 110m H / Discus / Pole vault / Javelin / 1500m; 11.7 / 6.01 m / 7.53 m / 1.50 m / 55.5 / 20.0 / 18.98 m / 2.60 m / 33.72 m / 4:38.5					
Decathlon	4929 pts	John Godonou-Dossou	December 1962		Porto-Novo, Benin	
Decathlon	100m / Long jump / Shot put / High jump / 400m / 110m H / Discus / Pole vault / Javelin / 1500m					
20 km walk (road)						
50 km walk (road)						
4 × 100 m relay	40.17	Benin; Issifou Moutalabi; Arcadius Fanou; Pascal Dangbo; Souhalia Alamou	15 September 1999	All-Africa Games	Johannesburg, South Africa	
4 × 400 m relay	3:11.71	Benin; Blaise de Campos; Abdoulaye Chérif Issa; D.N. Tevoue; Mathieu Gnanligo	27 May 2007		Ouagadougou, Burkina Faso	

=== Women ===
Event	Record	Athlete	Date	Meet	Place	Ref.
100 m	11.55 (+2.0 m/s)	Fabienne Féraez	12 May 2006	Qatar Athletic Super Grand Prix	Doha, Qatar	
200 m	22.81 (+0.7 m/s)	Fabienne Féraez	16 July 2005		Angers, France	
400 m	51.47	Fabienne Féraez	14 July 2006	Golden Gala	Rome, Italy	
600 m	1:25.78	Noélie Yarigo	27 August 2017	ISTAF Berlin	Berlin, Germany	
800 m	1:58.65	Noélie Yarigo	9 June 2023	Meeting de Paris	Paris, France	
1000 m	2:36.30	Noélie Yarigo	3 July 2021	KBC Night of Athletics	Heusden-Zolder, Belgium	
1500 m	4:20.09	Noélie Yarigo	23 June 2018		Blois, France	
3000 m	10:11.02	Kabiratou Nassam Alassani	11 July 2016		Ertvelde, Belgium	
5000 m	17:00.05	Kabiratou Nassam Alassani	26 June 2016		Brussels, Belgium	
10,000 m						
10 km (road)	38:09	Noelie Yarigo	28 March 2016		Brussels, Belgium	
Half marathon	1:20:27	Kabiratou Nassam Alassani	2 October 2016	Brussels Half Marathon	Brussels, Belgium	
Marathon	2:54:46	Bentille Alassane	6 February 2016	Marathon Selélien	Parakou, Benin	
100 m hurdles	13.25 (+1.2 m/s)	Odile Ahouanwanou	19 June 2021	Mehrkampf-Meeting Ratingen	Ratingen, Germany	
400 m hurdles	57.75	Bimbo Miel Blessing Ayédou	20 April 2011		Saint-Denis, Réunion	
400 m hurdles	56.66	Bimbo Miel Ayedou	24 July 2011		Ouagadougou, Burkina Faso	
3000 m steeplechase						
High jump	1.78 m	Odile Ahouanwanou	14 July 2017		Marseille, France	
High jump	1.79 m (Note: record set during heptathlon competition)	Odile Ahouanwanou	20 March 2024	African Games	Accra, Ghana	
Pole vault						
Long jump	6.12 m	Anne Abossèdé Okafor	18 July 2010		Porto-Novo, Benin	
Triple jump	12.68 m	Sonya Agbéssi	19 June 1994		Villeneuve d'Ascq, France	
Shot put	15.79 m	Odile Ahouanwanou	19 June 2021	Mehrkampf-Meeting Ratingen	Ratingen, Germany	
Discus throw	42.62 m	Sabine Zachèe	8 May 2004		Cotonou, Benin	
Hammer throw	21.30 m	Graetta Gbenou	24 April 2010		Grenoble, France	
Javelin throw	56.75 m	Pascaline Adanhoegbe	8 September 2020	Palio Città della Quercia	Rovereto, Italy	
Heptathlon	6274 pts	Odile Ahouanwanou	19–20 June 2021	Mehrkampf-Meeting Ratingen	Ratingen, Germany	
Heptathlon	100m H / High jump / Shot put / 200m / Long jump / Javelin / 800m; 13.25 (+1.2 m/s) / 1.73 m / 15.79 m / 24.45 (−0.3 m/s) / 6.07 m (+0.1 m/s) / 48.02 m / 2:25.44					
20 km walk (road)						
50 km walk (road)						
4 × 100 m relay	46.45	Benin; Sidi Gbadamassi Bayo; Fabienne Féraez; Angele Akpogan; Nidjad Inoussa	13 October 2003	All-Africa Games	Abuja, Nigeria	
4 × 400 m relay	3:42.85	Benin; Souliatou Saka; Bimbo Miel Ayedou; Claudine Yemalin; K. Nasrou	24 May 2009		Porto-Novo, Benin	

== Indoor ==
=== Men ===
Event	Record	Athlete	Date	Meet	Place	Ref.
60 m	6.81	Souhalia Alamou	19 February 2005		Montreal, Canada	
200 m	23.08	Geraud Dohou	25 January 2014		Bordeaux, France	
400 m	51.20	Yaovi Michael Gougou	9 March 2012	World Championships	Istanbul, Turkey	
800 m						
1500 m						
3000 m						
60 m hurdles	8.99	Gerald-James Tchiakbe	11 February 2012		Eaubonne, France	
High jump	1.33 m	Dalil Chablis	7 November 2015		Fontainebleau, France	
Pole vault						
Long jump	7.68 m	Romeo N'tia	29 February 2020		Liévin, France	
Triple jump	14.72 m	Mathis Oussou	26 February 2023		Lyon, France	
Shot put	15.25 m	Enock Lokossou	6 January 2018		Eaubonne, France	
Heptathlon						
Heptathlon	60m / Long jump / Shot put / High jump / 60m H / Pole vault / 1000m					
5000 m walk						
4 × 400 m relay						

=== Women ===
Event	Record	Athlete	Date	Meet	Place	Ref.
60 m	7.44	Fabienne Féraez	4 February 2005		Eaubonne, France	
200 m	24.12	Odile Ahouanwanou	9 January 2022	Pre Regionaux	Val-de-Reuil, France	
400 m	55.11	Noélie Yarigo	26 January 2014		Bordeaux, France	
400 m	54.26 X (Note: Bimbo Miel Ayedou failed a drug test for nandrolone)	Bimbo Miel Ayedou	9 March 2012	World Championships	Istanbul, Turkey	
800 m	1:58.48	Noélie Yarigo	8 February 2023	Copernicus Cup	Toruń, Poland	
1500 m						
3000 m						
60 m hurdles	8.29	Odile Ahouanwanou	3 February 2018	Meeting Elite en Salle	Mondeville, France	
High jump	1.78 m (Note: outdoor mark ratified as absolute record)	Odile Ahouanwanou	22 January 2017		Eaubonne, France	
Pole vault						
Long jump	6.09 m (Note: record set during pentathlon competition)	Odile Ahouanwanou	23 January 2021		Aubière, France	
Triple jump	8.66 m	Chimene Anani	19 November 2006		Mondeville, France	
Shot put	15.10 m (Note: record set during pentathlon competition)	Odile Ahouanwanou	23 January 2021		Aubière, France	
Pentathlon	4461 pts	Odile Ahouanwanou	23 January 2021		Aubière, France	
Pentathlon	60m H / High jump / Shot put / Long jump / 800m; 8.30 / 1.73 m / 15.10 m / 6.09 m / 2:24.42					
3000 m walk						
4 × 400 m relay						
