= Paskov (surname) =

Paskov (masculine, Bulgarian: Пасков) or Paskova (feminine, Bulgarian: Паскова) is a Bulgarian surname. Notable people with the surname include:

- Dimitar Paskov (1914–1996), Bulgarian scientist
- Ivan Paskov (born 1973), Bulgarian footballer
- Pancho Paskov (born 1994), Bulgarian fencer
- Viktor Paskov (1949–2009), Bulgarian writer, musician, musicologist and screenwriter
