= Salou (name) =

Salou is both a given name and a surname. Notable people with the name include:

- Salou Djibo (born 1965), Nigerien Army officer
- Salou Ibrahim (born 1979), Ghanaian footballer
- Bachirou Salou (born 1970), Togolese footballer
- Dramane Salou (born 1998), Burkinabé footballer
- Issah Salou (born 1999), Nigerien footballer
- Louis Salou (1902–1948), French actor
- Tadjou Salou (1974–2007), Togolese footballer
- Meriga Salou Seriki (born 1953), Beninese boxer
