= Benin at the Olympics =

- Flag of Benin
- IOC code: BEN
- NOC: Benin National Olympic and Sports Committee
- Website: cnosben.org
- Medals: Gold 0 Silver 0 Bronze 0 Total 0

Summer appearances
- 1972; 1976; 1980; 1984; 1988; 1992; 1996; 2000; 2004; 2008; 2012; 2016; 2020; 2024

Benin has sent athletes to every Summer Olympic Games held since 1980. Under its previous name of Dahomey, the country also competed in 1972. Despite appearing in 13 different Olympics, Benin has never won an Olympic medal. The nation has competed at the Winter Olympic Games for the first time in 2026.

== History ==
The country first participated at the 1972 Summer Olympics in Munich under its name Dahomey. After changing its name to Benin in 1975, the country first competed under its name in Moscow in 1980 and has sent its own athletes to the Olympics ever since.

== Medal tables ==
=== Medals by Summer Games ===
Games	Athletes	Gold	Silver	Bronze	Total	Rank
(West Germany) 1972 Munich	3	0	0	0	0	–
(Canada) 1976 Montreal	did not participate					
(Soviet Union) 1980 Moscow	18	0	0	0	0	–
(United States) 1984 Los Angeles	3	0	0	0	0	–
(South Korea) 1988 Seoul	7	0	0	0	0	–
(Spain) 1992 Barcelona	6	0	0	0	0	–
(United States) 1996 Atlanta	5	0	0	0	0	–
(Australia) 2000 Sydney	4	0	0	0	0	–
(Greece) 2004 Athens	4	0	0	0	0	–
(China) 2008 Beijing	5	0	0	0	0	–
(United Kingdom) 2012 London	5	0	0	0	0	–
(Brazil) 2016 Rio de Janeiro	6	0	0	0	0	–
(Japan) 2020 Tokyo	7	0	0	0	0	–
(France) 2024 Paris	5	0	0	0	0	–
(United States) 2028 Los Angeles	future event					
(Australia) 2032 Brisbane	future event					
Total		0	0	0	0	–

=== Medals by Winter Games ===
Games	Athletes	Gold	Silver	Bronze	Total	Rank
(Italy) 2026 Milano Cortina	1	0	0	0	0	–
(France) 2030 French Alps	future event					
(United States) 2034 Utah	future event					
Total		0	0	0	0	–

== See also ==
- List of flag bearers for Benin at the Olympics
- Benin at the Paralympics
