= Benin at the 2024 Summer Olympics =

- Flag of Benin
- IOC code: BEN
- NOC: Benin National Olympic and Sports Committee
- Website: cnosben.org

in Paris, France 26 July 2024 – 11 August 2024
- Competitors: 5 (3 men and 2 women) in 3 sports
- Flag bearers (opening): Valentin Houinato & Noélie Yarigo
- Flag bearers (closing): Alexis Kpadi & Noélie Yarigo
- Medals: Gold 0 Silver 0 Bronze 0 Total 0

Summer Olympics appearances (overview)
- 1972; 1976; 1980; 1984; 1988; 1992; 1996; 2000; 2004; 2008; 2012; 2016; 2020; 2024

Benin competed at the 2024 Summer Olympics in Paris, France, from 26 July to 11 August 2024. It was the nation's thirteenth appearance at the Summer Olympics, with the exception of the 1976 Summer Olympics in Montreal because of the African boycott.

== Competitors ==
The following is the list of number of competitors in the Games.

Sport	Men	Women	Total
Athletics	1	1	2
Judo	1	0	1
Swimming	1	1	2
Total	3	2	5

== Athletics ==
Beninese track and field athletes achieved the entry standards for Paris 2024, either by passing the direct qualifying mark (or time for track and road races) or by world ranking, in the following events (a maximum of 3 athletes each):

Key

- Note–Ranks given for track events are within the athlete's heat only
- Q = Qualified for the next round
- q = Qualified for the next round as a fastest loser or, in field events, by position without achieving the qualifying target
- NR = National record
- N/A = Round not applicable for the event
- Bye = Athlete not required to compete in round

Track & road events

Athlete	Event	Preliminary		Heat		Repechage		Semifinal		Final	
Athlete	Event	Result	Rank	Result	Rank	Result	Rank	Result	Rank	Result	Rank
Didier Kiki	Men's 100 m	10.76	3	Did not advance		—		Did not advance			
Noélie Yarigo	Women's 800 m	—		1:59.68	3 Q	Bye		2:01.35	8	Did not advance	

== Judo ==
Benin received one quota place for the Games based on the allocations of African continental quota.

Athlete	Event	Round of 64	Round of 32	Round of 16	Quarterfinals	Semifinals	Repechage	Final / BM	
Athlete	Event	Opposition Result	Opposition Result	Opposition Result	Opposition Result	Opposition Result	Opposition Result	Opposition Result	Rank
Valentin Houinato	Men's 81 kg	—	Esposito (ITA); L 00–10	Did not advance					

== Swimming ==
Benin sent two swimmers to compete at the 2024 Paris Olympics.

Athlete	Event	Heat		Semifinal		Final	
Athlete	Event	Time	Rank	Time	Rank	Time	Rank
Alexis Kpadi	Men's 100 m backstroke	57.61	42	Did not advance			
Ionnah Eliane Douillet	Women's 50 m freestyle	27.64	45	Did not advance			

Qualifiers for the latter rounds (Q) of all events were decided on a time only basis, therefore positions shown are overall results versus competitors in all heats.
