= Benin at the 2020 Summer Olympics =

- Flag of Benin
- IOC code: BEN
- NOC: Benin National Olympic and Sports Committee
- Website: cnosben.org

in Tokyo, Japan 23 July 2021 – 8 August 2021
- Competitors: 7 in 4 sports
- Flag bearers (opening): Nafissath Radji; Privel Hinkati
- Flag bearer (closing): N/A
- Medals: Gold 0 Silver 0 Bronze 0 Total 0

Summer Olympics appearances (overview)
- 1972; 1976; 1980; 1984; 1988; 1992; 1996; 2000; 2004; 2008; 2012; 2016; 2020; 2024

Benin competed at the 2020 Summer Olympics in Tokyo. Originally scheduled to take place from 24 July to 9 August 2020, the Games were postponed to 23 July to 8 August 2021, because of the COVID-19 pandemic. It was the nation's twelfth appearance at the Summer Olympics, with the exception of the 1976 Summer Olympics in Montreal because of the African boycott.

== Competitors ==
The following is the list of number of competitors in the Games.

| Sport | Men | Women | Total |
|---|---|---|---|
| Athletics | 1 | 2 | 3 |
| Judo | 1 | 0 | 1 |
| Rowing | 1 | 0 | 1 |
| Swimming | 1 | 1 | 2 |
| Total | 4 | 3 | 7 |

== Athletics ==
Beninese athletes further achieved the entry standards, either by qualifying time or by world ranking, in the following track and field events (up to a maximum of 3 athletes in each event):

Key

- Note–Ranks given for track events are within the athlete's heat only
- Q = Qualified for the next round
- q = Qualified for the next round as a fastest loser or, in field events, by position without achieving the qualifying target
- NR = National record
- N/A = Round not applicable for the event
- Bye = Athlete not required to compete in round

Track & road events

| Athlete | Event | Heat | | Quarterfinal | | Semifinal | | Final | |
| Athlete | Event | Result | Rank | Result | Rank | Result | Rank | Result | Rank |
|---|---|---|---|---|---|---|---|---|---|
| Didier Kiki | Men's 100 m | 10.69 PB | 6 | Did not advance | | | | | |
| Noélie Yarigo | Women's 800 m | 2:00.11 | 2 Q | — | | 2:01.41 | 7 | Did not advance | |

Combined events – Women's heptathlon

| Athlete | Event | 100H | HJ | SP | 200 m | LJ | JT | 800 m | Final | Rank |
|---|---|---|---|---|---|---|---|---|---|---|
| Odile Ahouanwanou | Result | 13.31 | 1.74 | 15.45 | 23.85 SB | 6.07 | 43.96 | 2:29.05 | 6186 | 15 |
| Odile Ahouanwanou | Points | 1078 | 903 | 891 | 995 | 871 | 743 | 705 | 6186 | 15 |

== Judo ==
Benin received an invitation from the Tripartite Commission and the International Judo Federation to send Rio 2016 Olympian Celtus Dossou Yovo in the men's middleweight category (90 kg) to the Olympics.

| Athlete | Event | Round of 64 | Round of 32 | Round of 16 | Quarterfinals | Semifinals | Repechage | Final / BM | |
| Athlete | Event | Opposition Result | Opposition Result | Opposition Result | Opposition Result | Opposition Result | Opposition Result | Opposition Result | Rank |
|---|---|---|---|---|---|---|---|---|---|
| Celtus Dossou Yovo | Men's −90 kg | Bye | Igolnikov (ROC); L 00–10 | Did not advance | | | | | |

== Rowing ==
Benin qualified one boat in the men's single sculls for the Games by finishing fifth in the A-final and securing the third of five berths available at the 2019 FISA African Olympic Qualification Regatta in Tunis, Tunisia, marking the country's debut in the sport.

| Athlete | Event | Heats | | Repechage | | Quarterfinals | | Semifinals | | Final | |
| Athlete | Event | Time | Rank | Time | Rank | Time | Rank | Time | Rank | Time | Rank |
|---|---|---|---|---|---|---|---|---|---|---|---|
| Privel Hinkati | Men's single sculls | 7:40.87 | 5 R | 7:55.93 | 4 SE/F | Bye | | 7:49.46 | 2 FE | 7:38.58 | 27 |

Qualification Legend: FA=Final A (medal); FB=Final B (non-medal); FC=Final C (non-medal); FD=Final D (non-medal); FE=Final E (non-medal); FF=Final F (non-medal); SA/B=Semifinals A/B; SC/D=Semifinals C/D; SE/F=Semifinals E/F; QF=Quarterfinals; R=Repechage

== Swimming ==
Benin received a universality invitation from FINA to send two top-ranked swimmers (one per gender) in their respective individual events to the Olympics, based on the FINA Points System of June 28, 2021.

| Athlete | Event | Heat | | Semifinal | | Final | |
| Athlete | Event | Time | Rank | Time | Rank | Time | Rank |
|---|---|---|---|---|---|---|---|
| Marc Dansou | Men's 50 m freestyle | 24.99 | 53 | Did not advance | | | |
| Nafissath Radji | Women's 50 m freestyle | 29.99 | 69 | Did not advance | | | |
