= Seppe Van Holsbeke =

Belgian fencer

Personal information
- Born: 19 January 1988 (age 38)

Sport
- Sport: Fencing

Seppe Van Holsbeke (born 19 January 1988) is a Belgian fencer. He competed in the men's sabre event at the 2016 Summer Olympics.
