= Fencing at the 2016 Summer Olympics – Men's sabre =

Men's sabre at the Games of the XXXI Olympiad
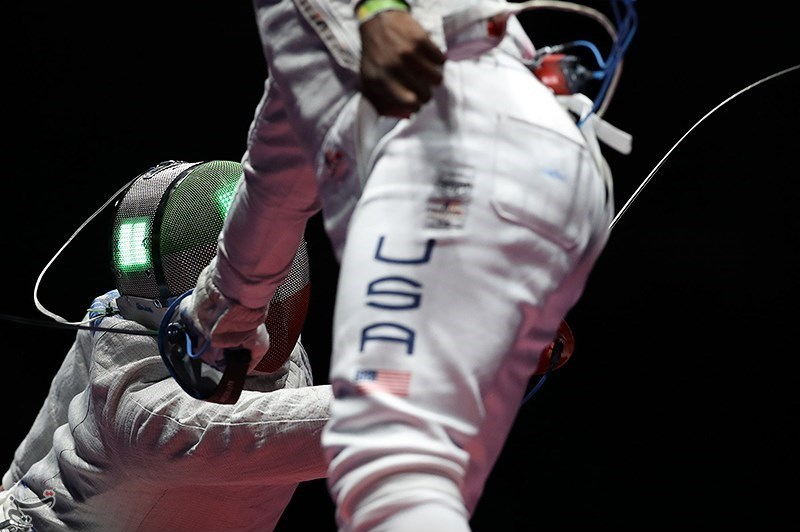
- Semifinal between Mojtaba Abedini (left) and Daryl Homer
- Venue: Carioca Arena 3
- Date: 10 August 2016
- Competitors: 32 from 25 nations

Medalists
1st place, gold medalist(s)		Áron Szilágyi	Hungary
2nd place, silver medalist(s)		Daryl Homer	United States
3rd place, bronze medalist(s)		Kim Jung-hwan	South Korea

The men's sabre competition in fencing at the 2016 Summer Olympics in Rio de Janeiro was held on 10 August at the Carioca Arena 3. There were 32 competitors from 25 nations. The event was won by Áron Szilágyi of Hungary, the fourth man to successfully defend an Olympic title in the sabre and 14th to win multiple medals of any color. It was Hungary's 14th gold medal in the event, half of all possible. Daryl Homer earned the United States' first medal in the event since 1984 with his silver, while Kim Jung-hwan took South Korea's first individual men's sabre medal ever with his bronze.

== Background ==
This was the 28th appearance of the event, which is the only fencing event to have been held at every Summer Olympics. Five of the quarterfinalists from 2008 returned: gold medalist Áron Szilágyi of Hungary, silver medalist Diego Occhiuzzi of Italy, bronze medalist Nikolay Kovalev of Russia, sixth-place finisher Daryl Homer of the United States, and seventh-place finisher Max Hartung of Germany. Russia had three different fencers win the three world championships since the 2012 Games: Veniamin Reshetnikov in 2013, Nikolay Kovalev in 2014, and Aleksey Yakimenko in 2015; with the national limit reduced to two fencers for the 2016 sabre competition, only Kovalev and Yakimenko entered the event. South Korea's Kim Jung-hwan was the top seed.

Benin made its debut in the men's sabre. Italy made its 26th appearance in the event, most of any nation, having missed the inaugural 1896 event and the 1904 Games.

== Qualification ==
Nations were limited to three fencers each from 1928 to 2004. However, the 2008 Games introduced a rotation of men's team fencing events with one weapon left off each Games; the individual event without a corresponding team event had the number of fencers per nation reduced to two. Men's sabre was the third event to which this applied, missing its team event in 2016, so the limit for individual men's sabre at this Games was two.

There were 32 dedicated quota spots for men's foil. The first 14 spots went to the top ranked individual fencers in the world rankings (adjusted to allow only two per nation). Next, 8 more men were selected from the world rankings based on continents: 2 each from Europe, the Americas, Asia/Oceania, and Africa. Each nation could only earn one spot from this continental ranking, but this could be added to a world ranking place (for a total of two). Finally, 10 spots were allocated by continental qualifying events: 4 from Europe, 2 from the Americas, 3 from Asia/Oceania, and 1 from Africa. Only nations without any fencers already qualified could enter these events, and only one fencer per nation could

Additionally, there were 8 host/invitational spots that could be spread throughout the various fencing events. Brazil had qualified one sabreur and elected not to use a host spot to add a second.

== Competition format ==
The 1996 tournament had vastly simplified the competition format into a single-elimination bracket, with a bronze medal match. The 2016 tournament continued to use that format. Fencing was done to 15 touches or to the completion of three three-minute rounds if neither fencer reached 15 touches by then. At the end of time, the higher-scoring fencer was the winner; a tie resulted in an additional one-minute sudden-death time period. This sudden-death period was further modified by the selection of a draw-winner beforehand; if neither fencer scored a touch during the minute, the predetermined draw-winner won the bout. Standard sabre rules regarding target area, striking, and priority were used.

== Schedule ==
All times are Brasília Time (UTC−03:00)

Date	Time	Round
Sunday, 10 August 2016		Round of 64; Round of 32; Round of 16; Quarterfinals; Semifinals; Bronze medal match Final

== Results ==
=== Top half ===
Round of 32
Kim Jung-hwan (KOR)	15
Yoandry Iriarte (CUB)	7
Renzo Agresta (BRA)	3
Sandro Bazadze (GEO)	15
Aldo Montano (ITA)	15
Farès Ferjani (TUN)	11
Tamás Decsi (HUN)	10
Nikolay Kovalev (RUS)	15
Tiberiu Dolniceanu (ROU)	15
Sun Wei (CHN)	7
Seppe van Holsbeke (BEL)	15
Eli Dershwitz (USA)	12
Aliaksandr Buikevich (BLR)	15
Joseph Polossifakis (CAN)	6
Julián Ayala (MEX)	9
Áron Szilágyi (HUN)	15

Round of 16
Kim Jung-hwan (KOR)	15
Sandro Bazadze (GEO)	14
Aldo Montano (ITA)	13
Nikolay Kovalev (RUS)	15
Tiberiu Dolniceanu (ROU)	15
Seppe Van Holsbeke (BEL)	13
Aliaksandr Buikevich (BLR)	12
Áron Szilágyi (HUN)	15

Quarter-finals
Kim Jung-hwan (KOR)	15
Nikolay Kovalev (RUS)	10
Tiberiu Dolniceanu (ROU)	10
Áron Szilágyi (HUN)	15

Semi-finals
Kim Jung-hwan (KOR)	12
Áron Szilágyi (HUN)	15

=== Bottom half ===
Round of 32
Gu Bon-gil (KOR)	15
Mohamed Amar (EGY)	9
Andriy Yahodka (UKR)	9
Mojtaba Abedini (IRI)	15
Diego Occhiuzzi (ITA)	12
Vũ Thành An (VIE)	15
Kenta Tokunan (JPN)	13
Vincent Anstett (FRA)	15
Max Hartung (GER)	15
Yémi Apithy (BEN)	9
Ilya Mokretsov (KAZ)	11
Daryl Homer (USA)	15
Ali Pakdaman (IRI)	11
Matyas Szabo (GER)	15
Pancho Paskov (BUL)	15
Aleksey Yakimenko (RUS)	14

Round of 16
Gu Bon-gil (KOR)	12
Mojtaba Abedini (IRI)	15
Vũ Thành An (VIE)	8
Vincent Anstett (FRA)	15
Max Hartung (GER)	12
Daryl Homer (USA)	15
Matyas Szabo (GER)	15
Pancho Paskov (BUL)	6

Quarter-finals
Mojtaba Abedini (IRI)	15
Vincent Anstett (FRA)	13
Daryl Homer (USA)	15
Matyas Szabo (GER)	12

Semi-finals
Mojtaba Abedini (IRI)	14
Daryl Homer (USA)	15

=== Finals ===
Semi-finals
Kim Jung-hwan (KOR)	12
Áron Szilágyi (HUN)	15
Mojtaba Abedini (IRI)	14
Daryl Homer (USA)	15

Final
Áron Szilágyi (HUN)	15
Daryl Homer (USA)	8
Bronze medal match
Kim Jung-hwan (KOR)	15
Mojtaba Abedini (IRI)	8

== Final classification ==
Rank	Fencer	Nation
1st place, gold medalist(s)	Áron Szilágyi	Hungary
2nd place, silver medalist(s)	Daryl Homer	United States
3rd place, bronze medalist(s)	Kim Jung-hwan	South Korea
4	Mojtaba Abedini	Iran
5	Tiberiu Dolniceanu	Romania
6	Vincent Anstett	France
7	Nikolay Kovalev	Russia
8	Matyas Szabo	Germany
9	Gu Bon-gil	South Korea
10	Max Hartung	Germany
11	Aldo Montano	Italy
12	Aliaksandr Buikevich	Belarus
13	Sandro Bazadze	Georgia
14	Seppe Van Holsbeke	Belgium
15	Vũ Thành An	Vietnam
16	Pancho Paskov	Bulgaria
17	Alexey Yakimenko	Russia
18	Diego Occhiuzzi	Italy
19	Eli Dershwitz	United States
20	Ali Pakdaman	Iran
21	Renzo Agresta	Brazil
22	Andriy Yagodka	Ukraine
23	Joseph Polossifakis	Canada
24	Ilya Mokretcov	Kazakhstan
25	Fares Ferjani	Tunisia
26	Tamás Decsi	Hungary
27	Yemi Geoffrey Apithy	Benin
28	Kenta Tokunan	Japan
29	Sun Wei	China
30	Julián Ayala	Mexico
31	Mohamed Amar	Egypt
32	Yoandry Iriarte	Cuba
