= Gloria Koussihouede =

Beninese swimmer

Personal information
- Full name: M. Gloria Koussihouede
- Nationality: Benin
- Born: 4 April 1989 (age 37) Porto-Novo, Benin
- Height: 1.64 m (5 ft 4 1/2 in)

Sport
- Sport: Swimming
- Strokes: Freestyle

M. Gloria Koussihouede, occasionally listed in results as "M. Koussihouede", (born 4 April 1989 in Porto-Novo, Benin) is a swimmer from Benin. She swam at the 2004 and 2008 Olympics.

== Results ==
- 2004 Olympics: Women's 100 free, 1:30.90 (50th)
- 2007 World Championships: Women's 50 free, did not swim.
- 2008 Olympics: Women's 50 free, 37.09 (87th)
