= Valentin Houinato =

Beninese judoka (born 1996)

Personal information
- Nationality: French, Beninese
- Born: 15 October 1996 (age 29) Melun, France
- Occupation: Judoka

Sport
- Country: Benin
- Sport: Judo
- Weight class: ‍–‍81 kg
- Rank: 1st dan black belt

Achievements and titles
- Olympic Games: R32 (2024)
- World Champ.: R32 (2025)
- African Champ.: (silver) (2025)
Medal record
Men's judo
Representing Benin
African Championships
| Silver medal – second place | 2025 Abidjan | ‍–‍81 kg |

Profile at external databases
- IJF: 67568
- JudoInside.com: 155325
- Updated on 16 June 2025

Valentin Houinato (born 15 October 1996) is a judoka and journalist. Born in France, he qualified to represent Benin at the 2024 Summer Olympics.

== Biography ==
Houinato was born on 15 October 1996 in Melun, France. He has Beninese ancestry through his father, and Houinato visited the country several times growing up. He played football as a youth, but his mother did not like the sport and signed him up for judo instead. He competed in judo for a time in Cesson but eventually quit the sport; when he was age 17, he decided to return to the sport. He became a black belt in 2014. However, he suffered a broken arm early into his return to judo and then competed at a low level for the following three years. He then left his club, in Brétigny-sur-Orge, and joined one in Sainte-Geneviève-des-Bois, Essonne.

Houinato attended school in Montpellier, studying journalism, and received a bachelor's degree in information and communication. He joined a club in Montpellier and rose through the ranks, competing in the 81 kg category. He ultimately reached a ranking in the top 20 nationally. After he graduated from school, Houinato also became a journalist for the broadcaster Radio France.

In 2022, Houinato, with a goal of ultimately competing at the Summer Olympic Games, decided to compete in judo for his father's home country of Benin, as it gave him a better opportunity of making the Olympics. However, due to the limited resources of Beninese athletic associations, Houinato mostly paid by himself to travel to tournaments, train, and get equipment. He described in Le Monde the difficulty of working full-time as a journalist and competing in judo: "there are a lot of struggles, so I'm talking about a lot of struggles ... I've been walking on a tightrope for months." Houinato placed fifth at the 2022 African Judo Championships and did the same again in 2023; he also won bronze medals at African Open events four times from 2023 to 2024, and competed at the 2024 World Judo Championships, where he lost in the round of 64.

As the Olympics approached, Houinato created a weekly radio show, "La Prépa", where he described his attempts to qualify. He told France 24 of his experience with journalism and judo: "It's a taste [of] hell because I don't sleep. I get up early, I go to bed late. I go to muscular training in the morning before I come to the radio. I'm coming to the editorial conference, I'm doing my day, and, when the news allows, I go straight to the judo after." Le Monde noted in April 2024:

For over a year, Houinato has been juggling work, training and tournaments without a coach to help him, dealing with injuries and struggling to find money – all on his own. He has a small sponsor and has launched an online fundraising campaign. All this exhausts him physically and mentally, sometimes to the point of bringing him to tears. A doctor told him he was suffering from "cognitive overload" and prescribed antidepressants.

By April 2024, Houinato's global ranking was 70th. To qualify, Houinato needed to rank in the top 12 in Africa. He ultimately was successful in qualifying.

Olympic Games
| Preceded by Privel Hinkati; Nafissath Radji | Flag bearer for Benin; Paris 2024 with Noélie Yarigo | Succeeded by Incumbent |
