= 2014 African Fencing Championships =

The 2014 African Fencing Championships were held in Cairo, Egypt from 20 to 24 June.

== Medal summary ==
=== Men's events ===
Event	Gold	Silver	Bronze
Foil	Mohamed Samandi (TUN)	Tarek Ayad (TUN)	Alaaeldin Abouelkassem (EGY); Mohamed Ayoub Ferjani (TUN)
Épée	Ahmed El-Saghir (EGY)	Ayman Mohamed Fayez (EGY)	Muhannad Saif El-Din (EGY); Abdelkarim El Haouari (MAR)
Sabre	Ziad Elsissy (EGY)	Yémi Apithy (BEN)	Aly Adel (EGY); Amine Akkari (EGY)
Team Foil	Egypt	Tunisia	Senegal
Team Épée	Egypt	Morocco	Senegal
Team Sabre	Egypt	Tunisia	Senegal

=== Women's events ===
Two nations only, Egypt and Algeria, entered a team in women's foil.

Event	Gold	Silver	Bronze
Foil	Inès Boubakri (TUN)	Eman Shaaban (EGY)	Anissa Khelfaoui (ALG); Amena Nour (EGY)
Épée	Sarra Besbes (TUN)	Juliana Barrett (RSA)	Ayah Mahdy (EGY); Salma Mokabel (EGY)
Sabre	Azza Besbes (TUN)	Amira Ben Chaabane (TUN)	Abik Boungab (ALG); Nada Hafez (EGY)
Team Foil	Egypt	Algeria	_
Team Épée	Tunisia	South Africa	Egypt
Team Sabre	Tunisia	Egypt	Algeria

=== Medal table ===
Rank	Nation	Gold	Silver	Bronze	Total
1	Tunisia	6	4	1	11
2	Egypt	6	3	9	18
3	South Africa	0	2	0	2
4	Algeria	0	1	3	4
5	Morocco	0	1	1	2
6	Benin	0	1	0	1
7	Senegal	0	0	3	3
Totals (7 entries)		12	12	17	41
