= Leopold Agbazo =

Beninese boxer (born 1945)

Personal information
- Nationality: Beninese
- Born: 25 January 1945 (age 80)
- Height: 1.59 m (5 ft 3 in)
- Weight: 54 kg (119 lb)

Sport
- Sport: Boxing

Leopold Agbazo (born 25 January 1945) is a Beninese boxer. He competed in the 1972 Summer Olympics.

== 1972 Olympic results ==
Below is the record of Leopold Agbazo, a Beninese bantamweight boxer who competed at the 1972 Munich Olympics:

- Round of 64: lost to Abdelaziz Hammi (Tunisia) by decision, 0-5

Olympic Games
Preceded by First	Flagbearer for Benin; 1972 Munich	Succeeded by Firmin Abissi
