= Yoandry Iriarte =

Cuban fencer (born 1986)

Personal information
- Full name: Yoandry Iriarte Galvez
- Born: 6 May 1986 (age 40) Habana, Cuba
- Height: 177 cm (5 ft 10 in)
- Weight: 79 kg (174 lb)

Sport
- Sport: Fencing

Yoandry Iriarte Galvez (born May 5, 1986) is a Cuban fencer. He competed in the men's sabre event at the 2016 Summer Olympics, and was eliminated in the first round by world no. 2 Kim Jung-hwan after a 15-7 loss.

He qualified by placing second (out of 14) in the American continental qualifying tournament, despite being ranked 137th worldwide. He was Cuba's only fencer at the Games, and their first Olympic fencer since 2008.
