= Jacob Gnahoui =

Beninese judoka

Personal information
- Born: 18 November 1985 (age 39)
- Occupation: Judoka

Sport
- Sport: Judo

Profile at external databases
- JudoInside.com: 79951

Jacob Gnahoui is a Beninese judoka who competes in the men's 60 kg category. At the 2012 Summer Olympics, he was defeated in the first round.

Olympic Games
| Preceded by Fabienne Féraez | Flagbearer for Benin; 2012 London | Succeeded by Yémi Apithy |
