= Pancho Paskov =

Bulgarian fencer

Personal information
- Born: 9 May 1994 (age 32) Sofia, Bulgaria

Fencing career
- Sport: Fencing
- Country: Bulgaria
- Weapon: sabre
- Hand: right-handed
- National coach: Ivailo Vodenov
- Club: Sveshnikov
- FIE ranking: current ranking

Pancho Paskov (Bulgarian: Панчо Пасков; born 9 May 1994) is a Bulgarian sabre fencer.

Paskov trained at Sveshnikov Club and at the Vasil Etropolski Academy in Sofia. In the 2011–12 season he won a silver medal at the Mediterranean Championships in Poreč. In the following season, at the age of 17, he reached the table of 64 at the Plovdiv World Cup.

In 2015 a knee injury compelled him to stop training for months. Lack of funds also prevented him from taking part in World Cup competitions. However, he ranked amongst the top four at the Prague pre-olympic tournament in April 2016, securing his qualification to the 2016 Summer Olympics. He is the first Bulgarian Olympic fencer since the 1988 Summer Olympics in Seoul. In the men's sabre event he created a surprise by eliminating World No. 1 Alexey Yakimenko in the first round, but he lost in the table of 16 to Germany's Matyas Szabo.
