= Ibrahima Idrissou =

Beninese sprinter

Personal information
- Nationality: Beninese
- Born: 1940 (age 85–86)

Sport
- Sport: Sprinting
- Event: 400 metres

Ibrahima Idrissou (born 1940) is a Beninese sprinter. He competed in the men's 400 metres at the 1972 Summer Olympics.
