= Alois Dansou =

Beninese swimmer

Personal information
- Born: 1982 (age 43–44)

Sport
- Sport: Swimming

Aloïs Dansou (born 1982) is an Olympic swimmer from Benin. He swam for Benin at the:

- Olympics: 2004, 2008
- World Championships: 2003, 2007
- African Swimming Championships: 2004
