= Georges Boco =

Beninese boxer (born 1963)

Personal information
- Nationality: Beninese
- Born: 17 May 1963 (age 61); Cotonou, Benin

Sport
- Sport: Boxing

Georges Boco (born 17 May 1963) is a Beninese former professional boxer. As an amateur, he competed in the men's welterweight event at the 1984 Summer Olympics.
