= Eric Agueh =

Beninese sprinter (born 1972)

Eric Agueh (born 13 April 1972) is a former Beninese sprinter who competed in the men's 100m competition at the 1996 Summer Olympics. He recorded a 10.58, not enough to qualify for the next round past the heats. His personal best is 10.34, set in 1994. He was also a part of Benin's men's 4 × 100 m relay team, which finished 6th in their heat with a 40.79. Agueh ran the first leg.
