= Firmin Abissi =

Beninese boxer (born 1951)

Firmin Abissi (born 25 September 1951) is a Beninese boxer who competed in the 1980 Summer Olympics in Moscow and the 1984 Summer Olympics in Los Angeles. During the 1980 games, he was eliminated in the second round of the men's bantamweight division by Ryszard Czerwiński of Poland. During the 1984 games, Abissi was eliminated in the second round of the men's bantamweight division by Barbar Ali Khan of Pakistan.

Abissi carried the flag for Benin during the opening ceremony for the 1984 Summer Olympics.

Olympic Games
Preceded by Leopold Agbazo	Flagbearer for Benin; 1980 Moscow; 1984 Los Angeles	Succeeded by Félicite Bada
