= Meriga Salou Seriki =

Beninese boxer (born 1953)

Personal information
- Nationality: Beninese
- Born: 8 April 1953 (age 71)

Sport
- Sport: Boxing

Meriga Salou Seriki (born 8 April 1953) is a Beninese boxer. He competed in the men's light flyweight event at the 1972 Summer Olympics.
