= Barthelémy Adoukonu =

Beninese boxer (born 1957)

Personal information
- Nationality: Beninese
- Born: 18 September 1957 (age 67)
- Height: 1.60 m (5 ft 3 in)
- Weight: 55 kg (121 lb)

Sport
- Sport: Boxing

Barthelémy Adoukonu (born 18 September 1957) is a Beninese boxer. He competed in the 1980 Summer Olympics.
