= Dossou Vignissy =

Beninese sprinter

Personal information
- Nationality: Beninese
- Born: 15 June 1954 (age 72)

Sport
- Sport: Sprinting
- Event: 4 × 100 metres relay

Dossou Vignissy (born 15 June 1954) is a Beninese sprinter. He competed in the men's 4 × 100 metres relay at the 1988 Summer Olympics.
