= Sonya Agbéssi =

Beninese long jumper

Medal record

Women's athletics

Representing Benin

African Championships
Bronze medal – third place	1992 Belle Vue Harel	Triple jump
Bronze medal – third place	1993 Durban	Triple jump

Sonya Agbessi is a Beninese long jumper. She competed at the 1992 Summer Olympics where she was also the flag bearer for Benin during the opening ceremony. In 2000, she was crowned triple jump champion at the Canadian Interuniversity Athletic (CIAU) Championship.

Olympic Games
Preceded by Félicite Bada	Flagbearer for Benin; 1992 Barcelona	Succeeded by Laure Kuetey
