= Laure Kuetey =

Beninese sprinter (born 1971)

Personal information
- Full name: Laure Isabelle Kuetey
- Nationality: Beninese
- Born: 6 March 1971 (age 55)

Sport
- Country: Benin
- Sport: Track and field
- Events: 100 meters, 200 metres

Achievements and titles
- Personal bests: 100 m: 11.87 s; 200 m: 24.80 s
Medal record
West African Athletics Championships
Bronze medal – third place	1999 Bamako	100 m

Laure Isabelle Kuetey (born 6 March 1971) is a Beninese sprinter who specializes in the Women's 100 meters and the Women's 200 metres events. She competed at the 200 metres event in the 1996 Summer Olympics, and the 100 metres event in the 1992 and 2000 Summer Olympics respectively. In addition, she was also the flag bearer for Benin in the 1996 and 2000 Summer Olympics opening ceremony.

Besides competing in the Olympics, Laure also competed at the Women's 100 metres event in the 1991 World Championships in Athletics, 1997 World Championships in Athletics and the 1999 All-Africa Games.

Olympic Games
Preceded by Sonya Agbéssi	Flagbearer for Benin; 1996 Atlanta; 2000 Sydney	Succeeded by Fabienne Féraez
