= Fabienne Feraez =

Beninese sprinter

Personal information
- Born: 6 August 1976 (age 50) Mont-de-Marsan, France

Sport
- Sport: Track and field
Medal record
Representing Benin
African Championships
Bronze medal – third place	2006 Bambous	200 m

Fabienne Feraez (born 6 August 1976) is a Beninese sprinter who specializes in the 200 metres. She switched nationality from her native France on August 12, 2003.

== Competition record ==
Year	Competition	Venue	Position	Event	Notes
Representing France
1999	Universiade	Palma de Mallorca, Spain	5th	200 m	23.45
Representing Benin
2003	World Championships	Paris, France	28th (qf)	200 m	24.17
2003	All-Africa Games	Abuja, Nigeria	8th	200 m	23.89
2003	All-Africa Games	Abuja, Nigeria	5th	4 × 100 m relay	46.45
2004	Olympic Games	Athens, Greece	21st (qf)	200 m	23.24
2005	World Championships	Helsinki, Finland	10th (sf)	200 m	23.29
2005	World Athletics Final	Monte Carlo, Monaco	7th	200 m	23.21
2005	Jeux de la Francophonie	Niamey, Niger	4th	200 m	23.78
2006	African Championships	Bambous, Mauritius	3rd	200 m	23.15
2006	World Athletics Final	Stuttgart, Germany	8th	200 m	23.21
2008	Olympic Games	Beijing, China	40th (h)	200 m	24.07

=== Personal bests ===
- 100 metres - 11.55 s (2006)
- 200 metres - 22.81 s (2005)
- 400 metres - 51.47 s (2006)

All times are Beninese records. She also co-holds the Beninese record in 4 x 100 metres relay.

Olympic Games
Preceded by Laure Kuetey	Flagbearer for Benin; 2004 Athens; 2008 Beijing	Succeeded by Jacob Gnahoui
