= Benin National Olympic and Sports Committee =

National Olympic Committee

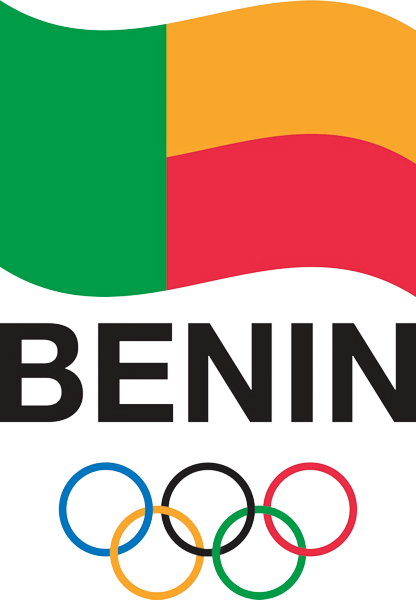
- Country: Benin
- Code: BEN
- Created: 5 May 1962
- Recognized: 1962
- Continental Association: ANOCA
- Headquarters: Cotonou
- President: Marius Francisco
- Secretary General: Julien V. Minavoa
- Website: cnosben.org

The Benin National Olympic and Sports Committee (French: Comité National Olympique et Sportif Béninois) (IOC code: BEN) is the National Olympic Committee representing Benin. It was created on 5 May 1962 and recognized by the International Olympic Committee in June 1962.

== History ==
In February 1962, the Secretary of the IOC was informed of a plan to create a National Olympic Committee in Dahomey. On 5 May 1962, representatives of seven national sport federations (athletics, basketball, boxing, cycling, football, volleyball, and tennis) formed the Dahoman National Olympic Committee. The Presidents of the Athletics and Volleyball Federations, Mr. Justin Durand and Mr. Adolphe Santos, became President and Secretary General, respectively, of the new NOC. A few weeks later in June at the 59th Session of the International Olympic Committee held in Moscow, the members granted the committee official recognition.

== Presidents of Committee ==
- 1962–1981 – Justin Durand
- 1981–1982 – Dr. Soule Dankoro
- 1982–2013 – Marius Francisco
- 2013–present – Julien Vinankpon Minavoa

== See also ==
- Benin at the Olympics
