= Flag of Benin =

Republic of Benin
- Use: National flag and ensign
- Proportion: 2:3
- Adopted: November 16, 1959; 67 years ago (Re-adopted on August 1, 1990)
- Design: A horizontal bicolour of yellow and red with a green vertical band at the hoist.

The national flag of Benin (French: drapeau du Bénin) is a flag consisting of two horizontal yellow and red bands on the fly side and a green vertical band at the hoist. Adopted in 1959 to replace the French Tricolour, it was the flag of the Republic of Dahomey until 1975, when the People's Republic of Benin was established. The new regime renamed the country and changed the flag to a green field with a red star in the canton. This version was utilized until multi-party democracy was re-established in 1990, coinciding with the Revolutions of 1989. The new government promptly restored the original pre-1975 flag.

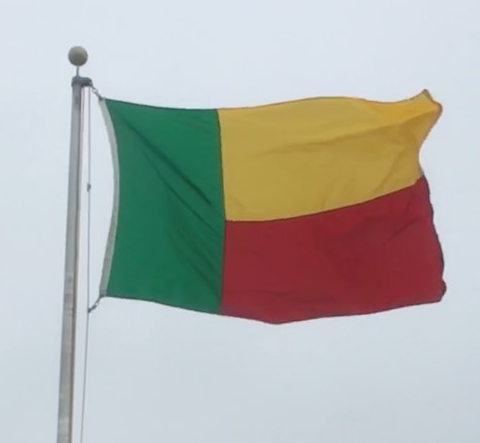
Flag of Benin

== History ==
Under French colonial rule over Dahomey, French authorities forbade the colony from having its own regional flag. This was because they were worried that this could increase nationalistic sentiment and lead to calls for independence. However, with the rise of the decolonization movement in Africa, the French were obliged to grant limited autonomy to Dahomey as a self-governing republic within the French Community. This was granted on December 4, 1958, and a search for a national flag began soon after.

The new flag was chosen on November 16, 1959, and remained unchanged when Dahomey became independent less than a year later on August 1, 1960. In 1972, a coup d'état took place in the country, with the new government aligning itself with Marxist–Leninist ideals. In order to symbolize the revolutionary change, the country was renamed Benin and a new flag was instituted three years later. It featured a green field charged with a five-pointed red star in the top-left canton. The new flag was never adopted by law, however, making it only the de facto flag of Benin.

The green flag remained in place until 1990, when economic problems and the weakening of the Soviet Union's power due to the Revolutions of 1989 culminated in the collapse of the People's Republic of Benin. The original flag from 1959 was reinstated on August 1, 1990.

== Design ==
The colours of the flag carry cultural, political, and regional meanings. As stated in the national anthem, the green of the flag represents the hope of a new democracy. The red represents the courage of the ancestors, and the yellow is for the treasures of the nation. On a continental level, the yellow, green and red represented the Pan-Africanist movement; the three colours were utilized by the African Democratic Rally, a political party representing the interests of French West Africa in the National Assembly of France at the time of decolonization. Furthermore, the colours are the same as the ones utilized in the flag of Ethiopia. This honours the oldest independent country in Africa and the only nation other than Liberia to remain independent during the Scramble for Africa.

Flag construction sheet

== Colour scheme ==
Benin	Green	Yellow	Red
Pantone	341c	Medium Yellow	185c
CMYK	100-0-41-47	0-17-94-1	0-96-82-9
RGB	0-136-80	252-210-15	233-9-41
Hexadecimal	#008850	#FCD20F	#E90929

== Historical flags ==
Flag	Years of use	Ratio	Government	Description
	1818–1859		Kingdom of Dahomey	The royal flag of King Ghezo. It featured a white field with a red border and an African war elephant in the center.
	1859-c. 1890		Kingdom of Dahomey	King Glele was not known to have used any royal flags or banners.
	c. 1890–1894		Kingdom of Dahomey	The royal banner of King Behanzin, which featured a light blue field with the coat of arms in the center.
	1894–1959	2:3	French Dahomey	The French tricolour was used as the official flag of French Dahomey.
	1959–1975	2:3	Republic of Dahomey	The first flag of Dahomey was introduced on November 16, 1959, after Dahomey was granted semi-autonomous status within the French Community. It consists of two horizontal yellow and red bands on the fly side and a green vertical band at the hoist.
	1975–1990	2:3	People's Republic of Benin	A new flag was introduced in 1975, following the 1972 coup d'état and the establishment of the People's Republic of Benin. It consisted of a green field charged with a five-pointed red star in the top-left canton. This is a reversal of the colours of the ruling party's flag.
	1990–Present	2:3	Republic of Benin	The pre-1975 flag was readopted in 1990, following the re-establishment of multi-party democracy.

== Other flags ==
=== Military ===
2:3 Flag of the Benin Armed Forces, obverse side

2:3 Flag of the Benin Armed Forces, reverse side

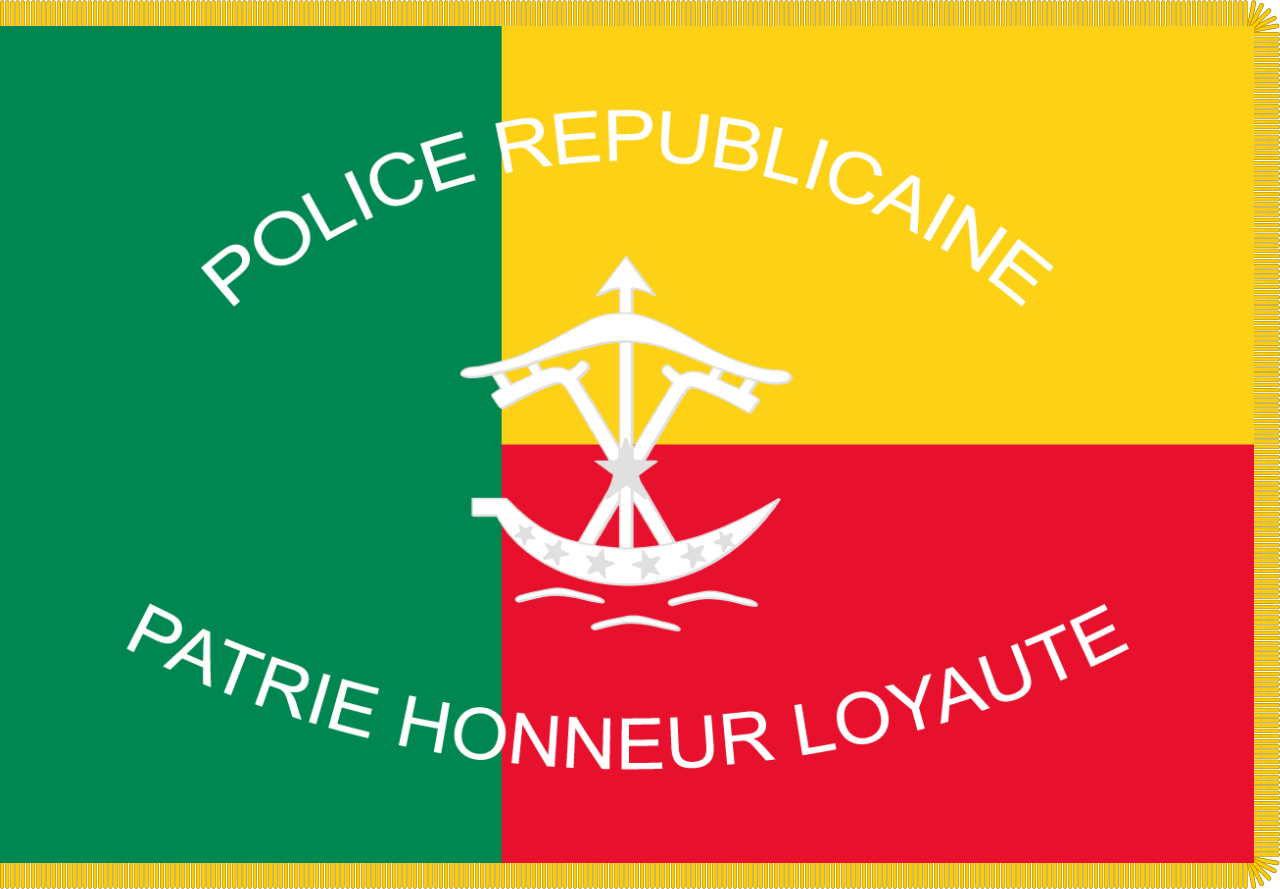
2:3 Flag of the Republican Police, obverse side

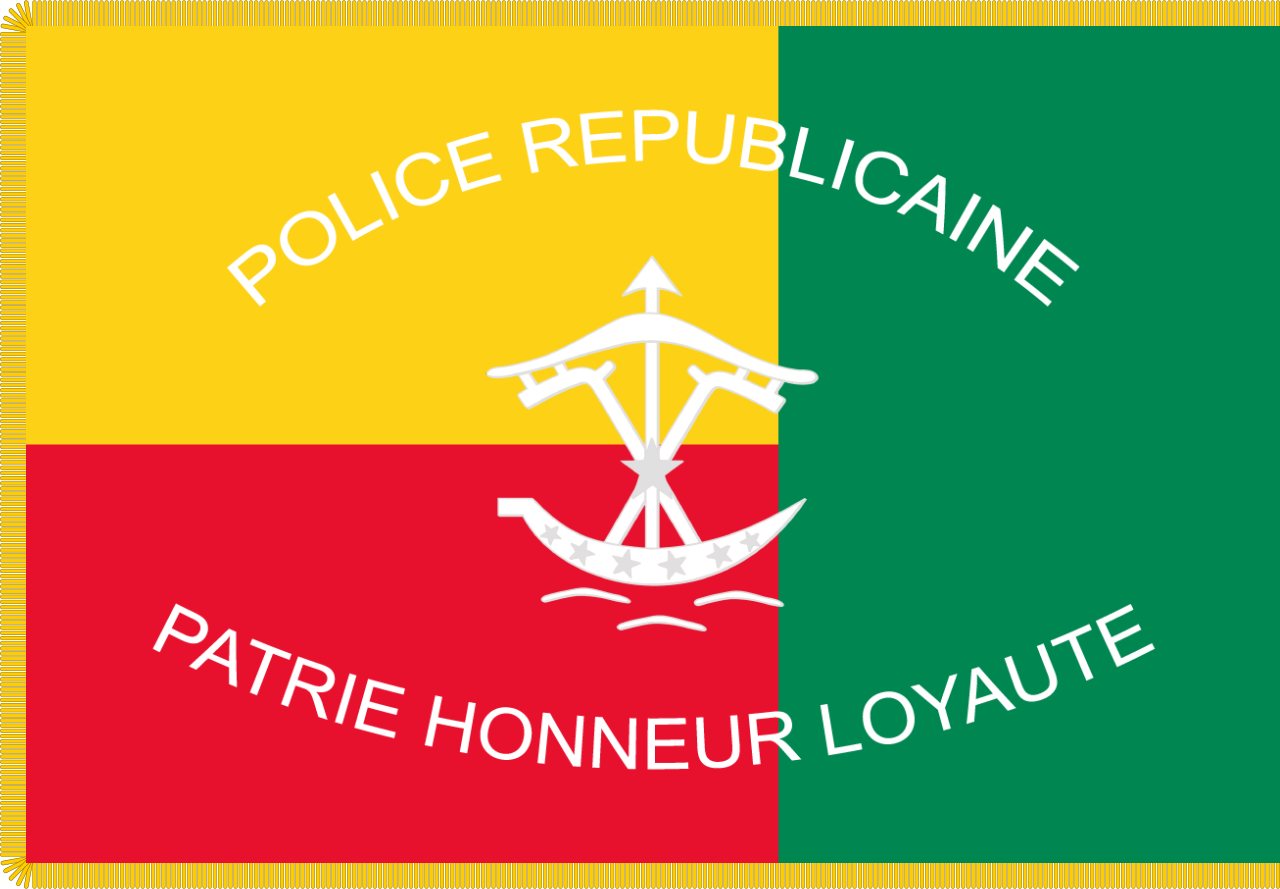
2:3 Flag of the Republican Police, reverse side

Roundel of the Benin Air Force

Historical roundel of the Benin People's Air Force (1975–1990)

== Gallery ==
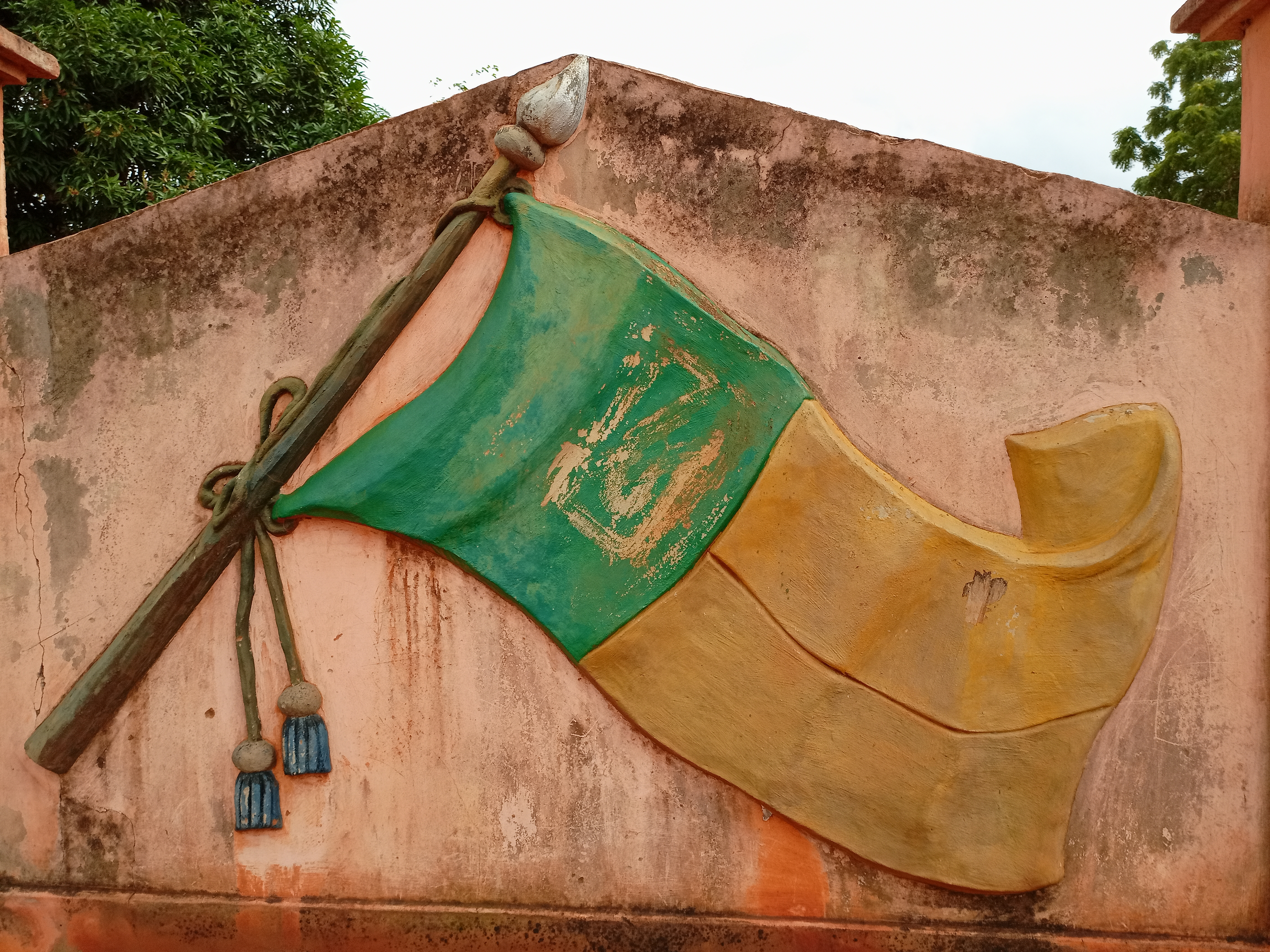
Faded mural depicting the national flag in Lissègazoun (2021)

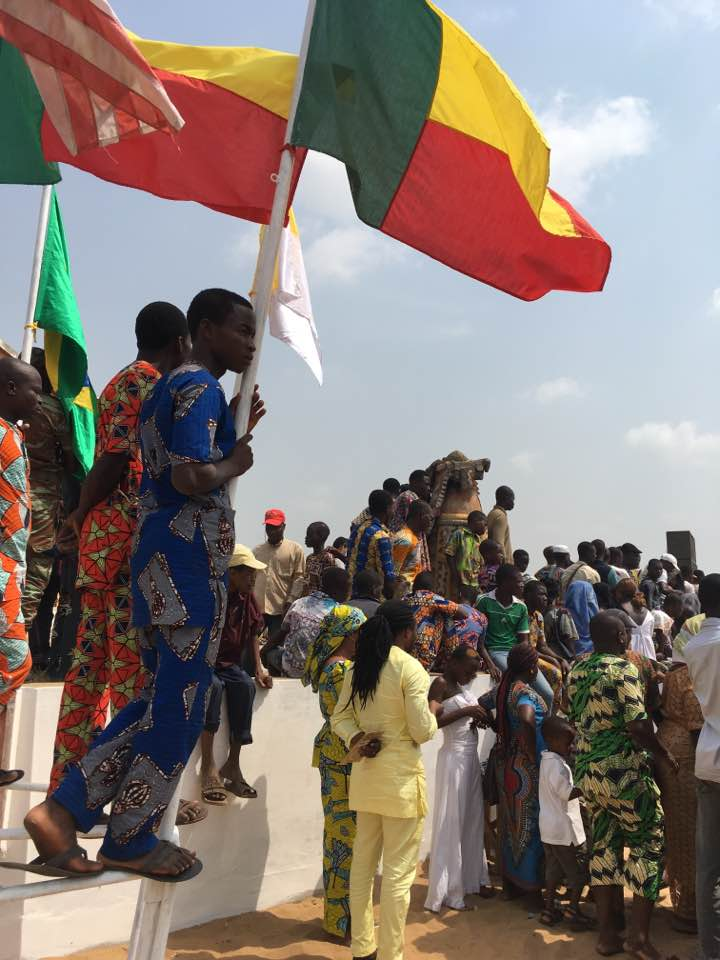
Flags flown in celebration of Fête du Vodoun in Ouidah (2017)

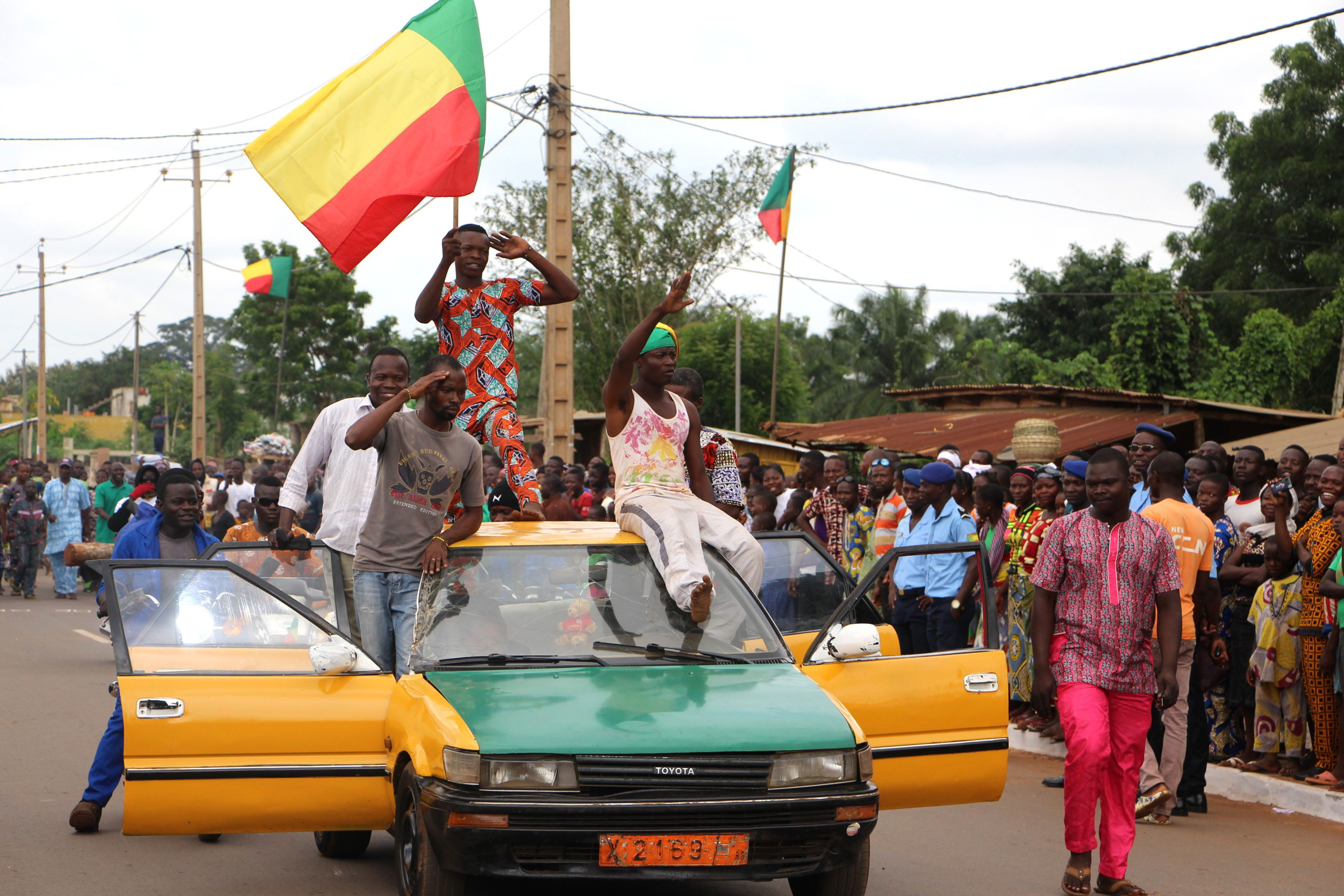
Beninese men waving the national flag on independence day (2016)

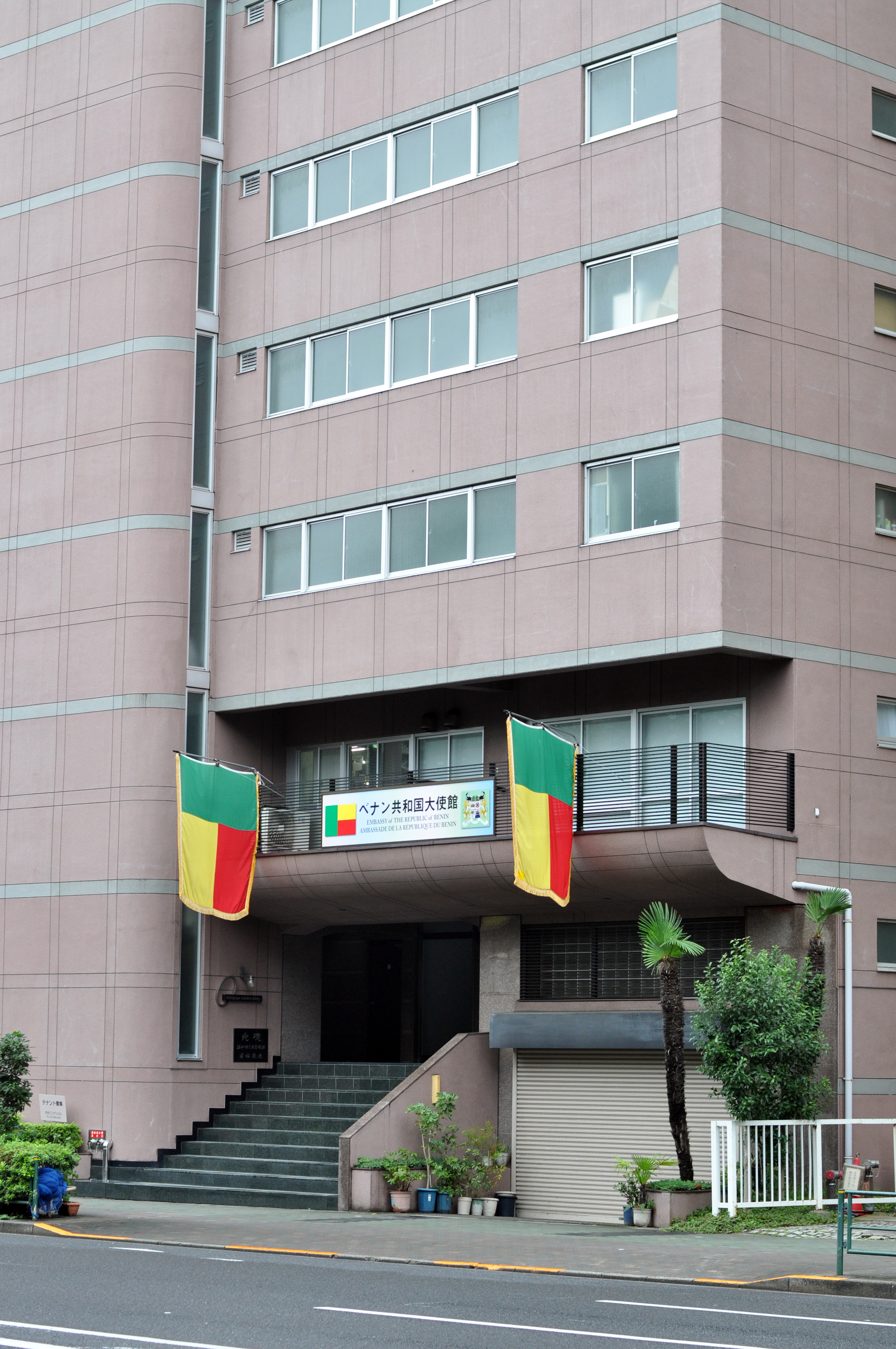
Flags outside the Embassy of Benin in Tokyo, Japan (2013)

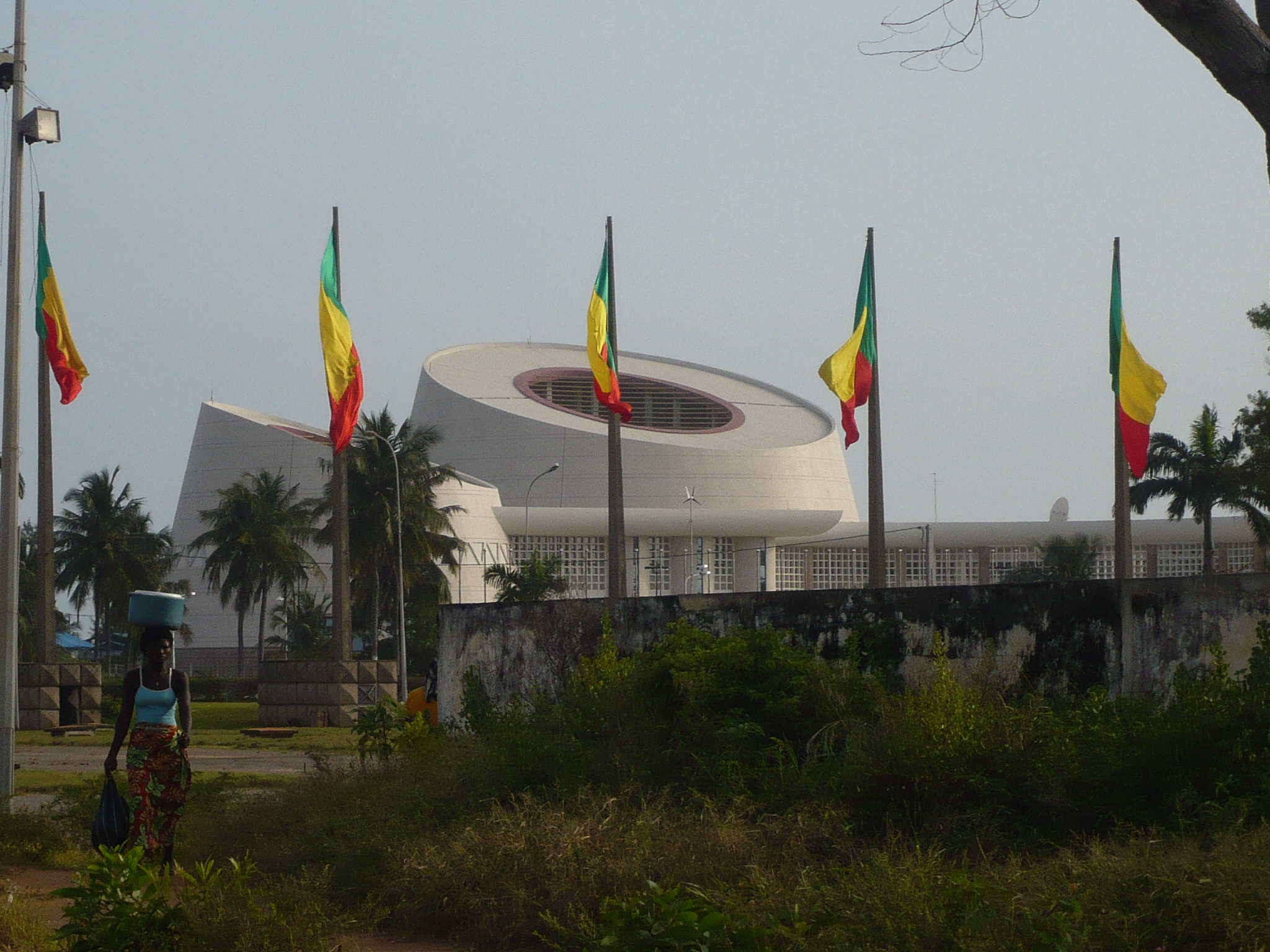
Beninese flags waving outside the Congress Palace of Cotonou (2009)

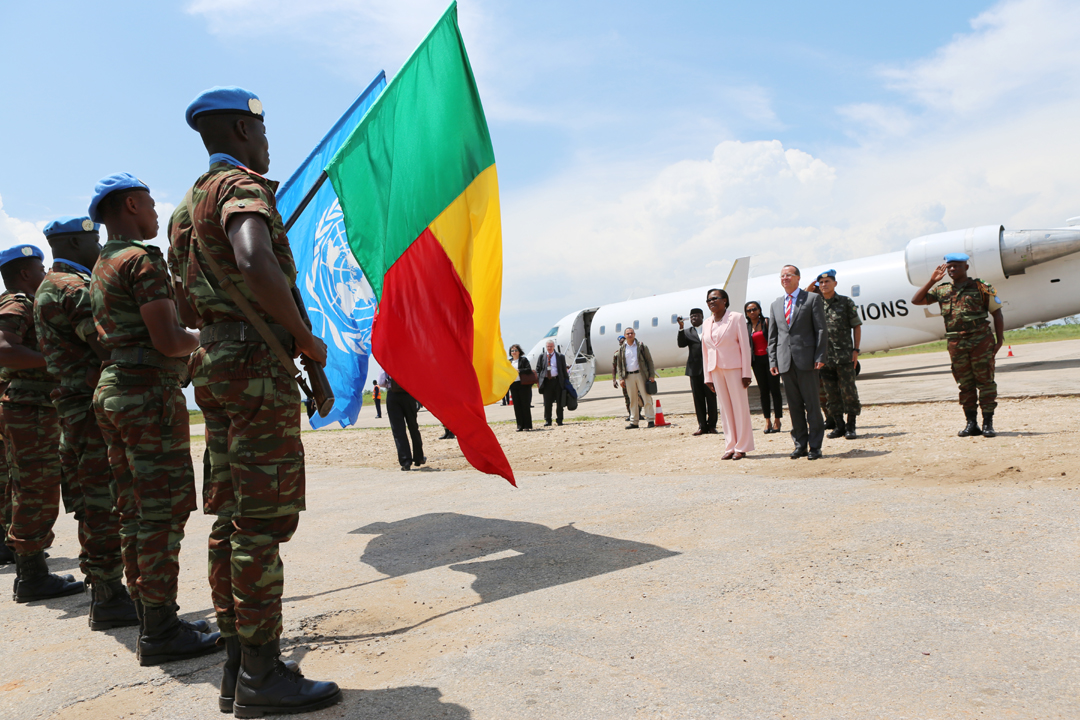
Beninese and United Nations flags flown by the Beninese contingent of MONUSCO (2000)

== See also ==
- Coat of arms of Benin
- Pan-African colours
- Unidentified flag from the Kingdom of Benin
