= 2014–15 Fencing World Cup =

International fencing competition

The 44th FIE Fencing World Cup began in October 2014 and concluded in July 2015 at the 2015 World Fencing Championships held in Moscow.

== Season overview ==
This edition was the first to feature the new Grand Prix format, consisting in nine events, three in each weapon, men and women fencing together. World Cup and Grand Prix competitions were spread over ten months instead of six. The calendar overhaul was designed to allow more time for the athletes to train and rest as well as to increase media visibility. The season saw the opening of the qualifying path for the 2016 Summer Olympics in Rio de Janeiro. The first competition counting for Olympic qualification was held on the 2 and 3 May for all three weapons, an event dubbed as the "super weekend" in Italy. The season was also marked by the FIE's cancellation of the men's sabre Dakar World Cup, due to take place on the 1 and 2 November 2014, as a preventive measure because of the Ebola virus epidemic in West Africa. In February 2015, the French delegation withdrew at the last minute from the women's foil World Cup in Algiers because of protests over the depiction of Muhammad after the Charlie Hebdo shooting.

In men's épée, France's Gauthier Grumier won his third World Cup series with a lead of 59 points over Switzerland's Max Heinzer. After a disappointing season, Italy's Rossella Fiamingo earned a European silver medal, then a consecutive second world title. She became the first Italian female epeeist to finish world no.1 since Elisa Uga in 1990, with a 2-point-lead over China's Xu Anqi and a 4-point-lead over Hungary's Emese Szász. France led the rankings in men's team épée with two gold medals and a continental title, followed by South Korea. In the women's, China finished no.1 thanks to two gold medals and a world title, ahead of Romania with four podium placings and a continental gold medal.

In women's foil, Elisa Di Francisca interrupted fellow Italian Arianna Errigo's streak of three series victories by finishing world no.1 for the second time in her career, with three gold medals in a row in Havana, Tauberbischofsheim and Shanghai, and a second consecutive European title in Montreux. She was closely followed by Errigo, who led the rankings for most of the season with three gold medals too, and by Russia's Inna Deriglazova, who claimed five medals and the World title. American Lee Kiefer was the only non-European to win a World Cup event and finished no.4. In men's foil, Race Imboden became the first American male fencer to win the overall World Cup. As in the previous season, three Americans featured in the Top 10. In women's team foil, Italy lost their crown to Russia, who won four gold medals out of five World Cup events. In the men's, Russia also finished first in the rankings, ahead of Italy, with five podiums (including) two gold medals in five competitions.

In men's sabre, Gu Bon-gil won the World Cup series for the second time in a row, followed by fellow South Korean Kim Jung-hwan and Hungary's Áron Szilágyi. In the women's, Russia's Sofiya Velikaya claimed her first end-of-the-season no.1 ranking after winning four World Cup gold medals and the European and World titles. Previous incumbent, Ukraine's Olha Kharlan, took gold medals in all three Grand Prix of the season and finished no.2 with a substantial lead over no.3 Mariel Zagunis of the United States. In men's team sabre, Italy placed first with three podiums, a continental medal and a world title. Russia and Germany finished respectively no.2 and no.3, separated by 2 points from each other. In the women's, Russia took the lead with three podiums and the continental and world titles, ahead of the United States and of Ukraine.

== Individual épée ==
=== Top 10 ===
Men
| 1 | (France) Gauthier Grumier | 221 |
| 2 | (Switzerland) Max Heinzer | 162 |
| 3 | (Italy) Enrico Garozzo | 153 |
| 4 | (Hungary) Géza Imre | 124 |
| 5 | (France) Ronan Gustin | 114 |
| 6 | (Venezuela) Rubén Limardo | 111 |
| 7 | (Hungary) Gábor Boczkó | 107 |
| 8 | (France) Daniel Jerent | 101 |
| 9 | (Czech Republic) Pavel Pitra | 89 |
| 10 | (South Korea) Park Kyoung-doo | 89 |

Women
| 1 | (Italy) Rossella Fiamingo | 170 |
| 2 | (China) Xu Anqi | 168 |
| 3 | (Hungary) Emese Szász | 165 |
| 4 | (Romania) Ana Maria Brânză | 157 |
| 5 | (Tunisia) Sarra Besbes | 141 |
| 6 | (Russia) Violetta Kolobova | 141 |
| 7 | (China) Sun Yujie | 136 |
| 8 | (Romania) Simona Gherman | 110 |
| 9 | (South Korea) Shin A-lam | 104 |
| 10 | (France) Marie-Florence Candassamy | 103 |

=== Men's épée ===
| Date | Event | Type | Gold | Silver | Bronze |
|---|---|---|---|---|---|
| 4 October 2014 | Tournoi satellite, Geneva | Satellite | Silvio Fernández (VEN) | Philippe Oberson (SUI) | Giacomo Paravicini (SUI); Bernardo Crecchi (ITA) |
| 11 October 2014 | Belgrade Trophy, Belgrade | Satellite | Liviu Dragomir (ROU) | Bertalan Arkosi (ROU) | Jan Bidovec (SLO); Dino Šourek (CRO) |
| 18 October 2014 | Kupittaa Tournament, Turku | Satellite | Sten Priinits (EST) | Jüri Salm (EST) | Alexander Lahtinen (FIN); Joar Sundman (SWE) |
| 25 October 2014 | Coupe du monde, Bern | World Cup | Jean-Michel Lucenay (FRA) | Géza Imre (HUN) | Gauthier Grumier (FRA); Ulrich Robeiri (FRA) |
| 1 November 2014 | JAFs Jubilaeumsstaevne, Aarhus | Satellite | Troels-Christian Robl (DEN) | Vitali Sokolovski (BLR) | Ján Cipár (SVK); Štefan Cipár (SVK) |
| 8 November 2014 | Trekanten Open, Copenhagen | Satellite | João Cordeiro (POR) | Patrick Jørgensen (DEN) | Kelvin Cañas (VEN); Francisco Limardo (VEN) |
| 14 November 2014 | Glaive de Tallinn, Tallinn | World Cup | Gauthier Grumier (FRA) | Christoph Kneip (GER) | Paolo Pizzo (ITA); Fabian Kauter (SUI) |
| 22 November 2014 | Tournoi satellite, Oslo | Satellite | Adam Larsson (SWE) | Alessandro Taccani (ARG) | Sten Priinits (EST); Jonas Lund (NOR) |
| 29 November 2014 | Tournoi satellite, Dublin | Satellite | John Wright (CAN) | Andrea Bombrini (ITA) | Matthew Baker (AUS); Edoardo D'Andrassi (ITA) |
| 5 December 2014 | Grand Prix du Qatar, Doha | Grand Prix | Daniel Jerent (FRA) | Peer Borsky (SUI) | Gauthier Grumier (FRA); Enrico Garozzo (ITA) |
| 13 December 2014 | Tournoi satellite, Kocaeli | Satellite | Edoardo D'Andrassi (ITA) | Kanan Aliyev (AZE) | Vakil Nasibov (AZE); Vitali Sokolovski (BLR) |
| 10 January 2015 | SAF Pokalen, Stockholm | Satellite | Nikolai Novosjolov (EST) | Alexander Lahtinen (FIN) | Philip von Platen (SWE); Sten Priinits (EST) |
| 22 January 2015 | Heidenheimer Pokal, Heidenheim | World Cup | Max Heinzer (SUI) | Yannick Borel (FRA) | Enrico Garozzo (ITA); Robin Kase (SWE) |
| 31 January 2015 | Tournoi satellite, Busto Arsizio | Satellite | Gabriele Cimini (ITA) | Vadim Anokhin (RUS) | Aleksey Tikhomirov (RUS); Igor Turchin (RUS) |
| 13 February 2015 | Coupe du Monde, Vancouver | World Cup | Ronan Gustin (FRA) | Pavel Pitra (CZE) | Jung Jin-sun (KOR); Rubén Limardo (VEN) |
| 15 March 2015 | Tournoi satellite, Sofia | Satellite | Aarón José Jiménez Ortiz (VEN) | Carlo Rota (ITA) | Okan Karadeniz (TUR); Paris Inostroza (CHI) |
| 22 March 2015 | Westend Grand Prix in Memoriam Vass Imre, Budapest | Grand Prix | Nikolai Novosjolov (EST) | Iván Trevejo (CUB) | Pavel Pitra (CZE); Benjamin Steffen (SUI) |
| 19 April 2015 | Pan American Championships, Santiago | Zone Championships | Rubén Limardo (VEN) | Maxime Brinck–Croteau (CAN) | Francisco Limardo (VEN); Reynier Henriquez Ortiz (CUB) |
| 2 May 2015 | Challenge SNCF Réseau, Paris | World Cup | Alexandre Blaszyck (FRA) | Gábor Boczkó (HUN) | Paolo Pizzo (ITA); Igor Turchin (RUS) |
| 16 May 2015 | Tournoi satellite, Split | Satellite | Tristan Tulen (NED) | Jesús Lugones (ARG) | Ariel Vinnicky (ISR); Jorg Mathe (AUT) |
| 22 May 2015 | Grand Prix, Rio de Janeiro | Grand Prix | Yannick Borel (FRA) | Max Heinzer (SUI) | Christoph Kneip (GER); Radosław Zawrotniak (POL) |
| 6 June 2015 | European Championships, Montreux | Zone Championships | Gauthier Grumier (FRA) | Max Heinzer (SUI) | Pavel Sukhov (RUS); Gábor Boczkó (HUN) |
| 11 June 2015 | African Championships, Cairo | Zone Championships | Alexandre Bouzaid (SEN) | Ahmed El-Saghir (EGY) | Ayman Fayez (EGY); Mohannad Saif (EGY) |
| 25 June 2015 | Asian Championships, Singapore | Zone Championships | Jiao Yunlong (CHN) | Park Kyoung-doo (KOR) | Minobe Kazuyasu (JPN); Elmir Alimzhanov (KAZ) |
| 13 July 2015 | World Championships, Moscow | Zone Championships | Géza Imre (HUN) | Gauthier Grumier (FRA) | Jung Seug-hwa (KOR); Patrick Jørgensen (DEN) |

=== Women's épée ===
| Date | Event | Type | Gold | Silver | Bronze |
|---|---|---|---|---|---|
| 11 October 2014 | Belgrade Trophy, Belgrade | Satellite | Avital Marinuk (ISR) | Alexandra Avena (MEX) | Claudia Năboiu (ROU); Ana Sel (SRB) |
| 18 October 2014 | Kupittaa Tournament, Turku | Satellite | Katrina Lehis (EST) | Sophie Haarlem (SWE) | Catharina Kock (FIN); Smiljka Rodić (SER) |
| 25 October 2014 | Trofeo Carroccio, Legnano | World Cup | Anfisa Pochkalova (UKR) | Ana Maria Brânză (ROU) | Britta Heidemann (GER); Emese Szász (HUN) |
| 1 November 2014 | JAFs Jubilaeumsstaevne, Aarhus | Satellite | Paula Schmidl (AUT) | Julia Kirschen (GER) | Tončica Topić (CRO); Karin Louise Hooge (DEN) |
| 9 November 2014 | Trekanten Open, Copenhagen | Satellite | Marzia Muroni (ITA) | Julia Kirschen (GER) | Caroline Piasecka (NOR); Simone Keimburg (GER) |
| 14 November 2014 | Tournoi International, Xuzhou | World Cup | Emese Szász (HUN) | Ana Maria Brânză (ROU) | Tatiana Logunova (RUS); Yana Shemyakina (UKR) |
| 23 November 2014 | Tournoi satellite, Oslo | Satellite | Johanna Bergdahl (SWE) | Katrina Lehis (EST) | Irina Embrich (EST); Johanna Halls (AUS) |
| 5 December 2014 | Grand Prix du Qatar, Doha | Grand Prix | Simona Gherman (ROU) | Erika Kirpu (EST) | Bianca Del Carretto (ITA); Emese Szász (HUN) |
| 13 December 2014 | Tournoi satellite, Kocaeli | Satellite | Dayana Martinez (VEN) | Giorgia Pometti (ITA) | Gökçe Günaç (TUR); María Martínez (VEN) |
| 10 January 2015 | SAF Pokalen, Stockholm | Satellite | Emma Samuelsson (SWE) | Irina Embrich (EST) | Johanna Bergdahl (SWE); Rayssa Costa (BRA) |
| 22 January 2015 | Ciutat de Barcelona, Barcelona | World Cup | Xu Anqi (CHN) | Mara Navarria (ITA) | Yana Shemyakina (UKR); Violetta Kolobova (RUS) |
| 13 February 2015 | Coupe du Monde, Buenos Aires | World Cup | Sarra Besbes (TUN) | Erika Kirpu (EST) | Britta Heidemann (GER); Shin A-lam (KOR) |
| 14 March 2015 | Tournoi satellite, Sofia | Satellite | Avital Marinuk (ISR) | Kata Mihály (HUN) | Raluca Sbîrcia (ROU); Diana Donoiu (ROU) |
| 20 March 2015 | Westend Grand Prix in Memoriam József Sákovics, Budapest | Grand Prix | Shin A-lam (KOR) | Ana Maria Brânză (ROU) | Tatyana Andryushina (RUS); Tatiana Logunova (RUS) |
| 18 April 2015 | Pan American Championships, Santiago | Zone | Nathalie Moellhausen (BRA) | Kelley Hurley (USA) | Leonora MacKinnon (CAN); Katherine Holmes (USA) |
| 26 April 2015 | Cole Cup, London | Satellite | Ayaka Shimookawa (JPN) | Caitlin Chang (JAM) | Katrina Smith (GBR); Maria Hugas Mallorqui (GER) |
| 1 May 2015 | World Cup, Johannesburg | World Cup | Sun Yujie (CHN) | Violetta Kolobova (RUS) | Choi In-jeong (KOR); Olga Kochneva (RUS) |
| 9 May 2015 | Tournoi satellite, Maalot | Satellite | Polina Melentiev (ISR) | Nickol Tal (ISR) | Yana Botvinik (ISR); Avital Marinuk (ISR) |
| 16 May 2015 | Tournoi satellite, Split | Satellite | Kata Mihály (HUN) | Kelly Boone (NED) | Dagmar Cipárova (SVK); Joanna Halls (AUS) |
| 24 May 2015 | Grand Prix, Rio de Janeiro | Grand Prix | Francesca Boscarelli (ITA) | Coraline Vitalis (FRA) | Kelley Hurley (USA); Sun Yiwen (CHN) |
| 6 June 2015 | European Championships, Montreux | Zone | Violetta Kolobova (RUS) | Rossella Fiamingo (ITA) | Simona Pop (ROU); Emese Szász (HUN) |
| 11 June 2015 | African Championships, Cairo | Zone | Sarra Besbes (TUN) | Inès Boubakri (TUN) | Nardin Ehab (EGY); Tamryn Carfoot (RSA) |
| 25 June 2015 | Asian Championships, Singapore | Zone | Xu Anqi (CHN) | Choi In-jeong (KOR) | Nozomi Sato (JPN); Ayaka Shimookawa (JPN) |
| 13 July 2015 | World Championships, Moscow | Worlds | Rossella Fiamingo (ITA) | Emma Samuelsson (SWE) | Xu Anqi (CHN); Sarra Besbes (TUN) |

== Individual foil ==
=== Top 10 ===
Men
| 1 | (United States) Race Imboden | 206 |
| 2 | (Japan) Yuki Ota | 196 |
| 3 | (United States) Alexander Massialas | 186 |
| 4 | (Italy) Andrea Cassarà | 169 |
| 5 | (Russia) Dmitry Rigin | 161 |
| 6 | (Italy) Daniele Garozzo | 155 |
| 7 | (France) Jérémy Cadot | 118 |
| 8 | (United States) Gerek Meinhardt | 111 |
| 9 | (Russia) Aleksey Cheremisinov | 104 |
| 10 | (Italy) Edoardo Luperi | 103 |

Women
| 1 | (Italy) Elisa Di Francisca | 249 |
| 2 | (Italy) Arianna Errigo | 244 |
| 3 | (Russia) Inna Deriglazova | 239 |
| 4 | (United States) Lee Kiefer | 188 |
| 5 | (South Korea) Jeon Hee-sook | 159 |
| 6 | (Tunisia) Inès Boubakri | 146 |
| 7 | (Russia) Larisa Korobeynikova | 138 |
| 8 | (Russia) Aida Shanayeva | 132 |
| 9 | (United States) Nzingha Prescod | 128 |
| 10 | (Italy) Valentina Vezzali | 124 |

=== Men's foil ===
| Date | Event | Type | Gold | Silver | Bronze |
|---|---|---|---|---|---|
| 19 October 2014 | Coupe du Monde, San Francisco | World Cup | Jérémy Cadot (FRA) | Andrea Baldini (ITA) | Lorenzo Nista (ITA); Edoardo Luperi (ITA) |
| 7 November 2014 | Prince Takamodo World Cup, Tokyo | World Cup | Race Imboden (USA) | Dmitry Rigin (RUS) | Enzo Lefort (FRA); Andrea Cassarà (ITA) |
| 15 November 2014 | Tournoi satellite, Antalya | Satellite | Michele Del Macchia (ITA) | Tevfik Burak Babaoğlu (TUR) | Fatih Güneş (TUR); Yaser Mohammad (KUW) |
| 30 November 2014 | Trofeo Inalpi, Turin | Grand Prix | Aleksey Cheremisinov (RUS) | Renal Ganeyev (RUS) | Race Imboden (USA); Valerio Aspromonte (ITA) |
| 13 December 2014 | Tournoi satellite, Kocaeli | Satellite | Martino Minuto (TUR) | Tevfik Burak Babaoğlu (TUR) | Gökhan Akyalçın (TUR); Engin Batuhan Menküer (TUR) |
| 11 January 2015 | Leon Paul Cup, London | Satellite | Laurence Halsted (GBR) | Francesco Trani (ITA) | Damiano Rosatelli (ITA); Yaser Mohammad (KUW) |
| 16 January 2015 | Challenge International de Paris, Paris | World Cup | Race Imboden (USA) | Daniele Garozzo (ITA) | Enzo Lefort (FRA); Alexander Massialas (USA) |
| 6 February 2015 | Löwe von Bonn, Bonn | World Cup | Andrea Cassarà (ITA) | Yuki Ota (JPN) | Alessio Foconi (ITA); Jérémy Cadot (FRA) |
| 13 March 2015 | Grand Prix, Havana | Grand Prix | Dmitry Rigin (RUS) | Alexander Massialas (USA) | Daniele Garozzo (ITA); Race Imboden (USA) |
| 18 April 2015 | Pan American Championships, Santiago | Zone | Race Imboden (USA) | Alexander Massialas (USA) | Gerek Meinhardt (USA); Heitor Shimbo (BRA) |
| 1 May 2015 | Fleuret de Saint-Pétersbourg, Saint-Petersburg | Satellite | Dmitry Rigin (RUS) | Andrea Cassarà (ITA) | Daniele Garozzo (ITA); Vincent Simon (FRA) |
| 9 May 2015 | Tournoi satellite, Copenhagen | Satellite | Laurence Halsted (GBR) | Alexander Tsoronis (DEN) | Martino Minuto (TUR); Tevfik Burak Babaoğlu (TUR) |
| 16 June 2015 | Grand Prix, Shanghai | Grand Prix | Miles Chamley-Watson (USA) | Alexander Choupenitch (CZE) | Erwann Le Péchoux (FRA); Dmitry Zherebchenko (RUS) |
| 6 June 2015 | European Championships, Montreux | Zone | Andrea Cassarà (ITA) | Daniele Garozzo (ITA) | Edoardo Luperi (ITA); Carlos Llavador (ESP) |
| 11 June 2015 | African Championships, Cairo | Zone | Ayoub Ferjani (EGY) | Roman Djitli (ALG) | Tarek Ayad (EGY); Mohamed Samandi (TUN) |
| 25 June 2015 | Asian Championships, Singapore | Zone | Yuki Ota (JPN) | Son Young-ki (KOR) | Kwon Young-ho (KOR); Cheung Ka Long (HKG) |
| 13 July 2015 | World Championships, Moscow | Worlds | Yuki Ota (JPN) | Alexander Massialas (USA) | Artur Akhmatkhuzin (RUS); Gerek Meinhardt (USA) |

=== Women's foil ===
| Date | Event | Type | Gold | Silver | Bronze |
|---|---|---|---|---|---|
| 15 October 2014 | Tournoi satellite, Cancún | Satellite | Nataly Michel (MEX) | İrem Karamete (TUR) | Alanna Goldie (CAN); Karin Miyawaki (JPN) |
| 17 October 2014 | World Cup, Cancún | World Cup | Arianna Errigo (ITA) | Lim Seung-min (KOR) | Kim Mi-na (KOR); Gaëlle Gebet (FRA) |
| 7 November 2014 | World Cup, Saint-Maur | World Cup | Arianna Errigo (ITA) | Lee Kiefer (USA) | Inna Deriglazova (RUS); Chiara Cini (ITA) |
| 15 November 2014 | Tournoi satellite, Antalya | Satellite | İrem Karamete (TUR) | Michala Cellerová (SVK) | Mariana Daffner (BRA); Cansu Tor (TUR) |
| 29 November 2014 | Trofeo Inalpi, Turin | Grand Prix | Arianna Errigo (ITA) | Elisa Di Francisca (ITA) | Anita Blaze (FRA); Adelina Zagidullina (RUS) |
| 13 December 2015 | Tournoi satellite, Kocaeli | Satellite | Nicole Mae Wong Hui Shan (SIN) | Liane Wong Ye Ying (SIN) | Aarya Berthier (SIN); İrem Karamete (TUR) |
| 16 January 2015 | Artus Court PKO BP, Gdańsk | World Cup | Astrid Guyart (FRA) | Jeon Hee-sook (KOR) | Ysaora Thibus (FRA); Inès Boubakri (TUN) |
| 6 February 2015 | World Cup, Algiers | World Cup | Lee Kiefer (USA) | Arianna Errigo (ITA) | Inna Deriglazova (RUS); Aida Shanaeva (RUS) |
| 13 March 2015 | Grand Prix, Havana | Grand Prix | Elisa Di Francisca (ITA) | Inna Deriglazova (RUS) | Ysaora Thibus (FRA); Jeon Hee-sook (KOR) |
| 20 April 2015 | Pan American Championships, Santiago | Zone Championships | Lee Kiefer (USA) | Nicole Ross (USA) | Isis Giménez (VEN); Saskia Loretta Garcia (COL) |
| 1 May 2015 | Reinhold-Würth-Cup, Tauberbischofsheim | World Cup | Elisa Di Francisca (ITA) | Arianna Errigo (ITA) | Valentina Vezzali (ITA); Inna Deriglazova (RUS) |
| 10 May 2015 | Tournoi satellite, Copenhagen | Satellite | Kelleigh Ryan (CAN) | Flavia Johana Mormandi (ARG) | İrem Karamete (TUR); Isis Giménez (VEN) |
| 16 June 2015 | Grand Prix, Shanghai | Grand Prix | Elisa Di Francisca (ITA) | Inna Deriglazova (RUS) | Inès Boubakri (TUN); Alice Volpi (ITA) |
| 6 June 2015 | European Championships, Montreux | Zone | Elisa Di Francisca (ITA) | Larisa Korobeynikova (RUS) | Aida Mohamed (HUN); Arianna Errigo (ITA) |
| 11 June 2015 | African Championships, Cairo | Zone | Inès Boubakri (TUN) | Noura Mohamed (EGY) | Yara El Sharkawy (EGY); Anissa Khelfaoui (ALG) |
| 25 June 2015 | Asian Championships, Singapore | Zone | Jeon Hee-sook (KOR) | Nam Hyun-hee (KOR) | Le Huilin (CHN); Kim Mi-na (KOR) |
| 13 July 2015 | World Championships, Moscow | Worlds | Inna Deriglazova (RUS) | Aida Shanayeva (RUS) | Arianna Errigo (ITA); Nzingha Prescod (USA) |

== Individual sabre ==
=== Top 10 ===
Men
| 1 | (South Korea) Gu Bon-gil | 212 |
| 2 | (South Korea) Kim Jung-hwan | 207 |
| 3 | (Hungary) Áron Szilágyi | 195 |
| 4 | (Russia) Aleksey Yakimenko | 192 |
| 5 | (Romania) Tiberiu Dolniceanu | 170 |
| 6 | (United States) Daryl Homer | 170 |
| 7 | (Germany) Max Hartung | 150 |
| 8 | (Russia) Kamil Ibragimov | 137 |
| 9 | (Italy) Aldo Montano | 128 |
| 10 | (Germany) Nicolas Limbach | 104 |

Women
| 1 | (Russia) Sofiya Velikaya | 295 |
| 2 | (Ukraine) Olha Kharlan | 237 |
| 3 | (United States) Mariel Zagunis | 195 |
| 4 | (China) Shen Chen | 143 |
| 5 | (Italy) Rossella Gregorio | 142 |
| 6 | (France) Cécilia Berder | 135 |
| 7 | (United States) Dagmara Wozniak | 131 |
| 8 | (Russia) Yana Egorian | 128 |
| 9 | (Hungary) Anna Márton | 127 |
| 10 | (Tunisia) Azza Besbes | 119 |

=== Men's sabre ===
| Date | Event | Type | Gold | Silver | Bronze |
|---|---|---|---|---|---|
| 11 October 2014 | Tournoi satellite, Bursa | Satellite | Beka Bazadze (GEO) | Nika Shengelia (GEO) | Azar Taghiyev (AZE); İbrahim Ahmet Ant (TUR) |
| 21 November 2014 | Coupe du monde, Budapest | World Cup | Gu Bon-gil (KOR) | Áron Szilágyi (HUN) | Aleksey Yakimenko (RUS); Aldo Montano (ITA) |
| 13 December 2014 | Grand Prix, New York | Grand Prix | Kim Jung-hwan (KOR) | Aldo Montano (ITA) | Diego Occhiuzzi (ITA); Áron Szilágyi (HUN) |
| 10 January 2015 | Tournoi satellite, Istanbul | Satellite | İbrahim Ahmet Ant (TUR) | Azar Taghiyev (AZE) | Ricardo Bustamante (ARG); Enver Yıldırım (TUR) |
| 31 January 2015 | Luxardo Trophy, Padova | World Cup | Kamil Ibragimov (RUS) | Andriy Yagodka (UKR) | Kim Jung-hwan (KOR); Oh Sang-uk (KOR) |
| 20 February 2015 | Sabre de Wolodyjowski, Warsaw | World Cup | Gu Bon-gil (KOR) | Tiberiu Dolniceanu (ROU) | Luca Curatoli (ITA); Áron Szilágyi (HUN) |
| 14 March 2015 | Tournoi satellite, Helsinki | Satellite | Alexander Crutchett (GBR) | Joseph Polossifakis (CAN) | Jevgenijs Zelikovics (LAT); Ricardo Bustamante (ARG) |
| 28 March 2015 | Grand Prix, Seoul | Grand Prix | Nicolas Limbach (GER) | Nicolas Rousset (FRA) | Kamil Ibragimov (RUS); Daryl Homer (USA) |
| 20 April 2015 | Pan American Championships, Santiago | Zone Championships | Eli Dershwitz (USA) | Daryl Homer (USA) | Renzo Agresta (BRA); Jeff Spear (USA) |
| 25 April 2015 | Cole Cup, London | Satellite | Vincent Anstett (FRA) | James Honeybone (GBR) | Jacob Gander-Compton (GBR); Alexander Crutchett (GBR) |
| 1 May 2015 | Villa de Madrid, Madrid | World Cup | Gu Bon-gil (KOR) | Kamil Ibragimov (RUS) | Max Hartung (GER); Tiberiu Dolniceanu (ROU) |
| 24 May 2015 | Tournoi satellite, Reykjavík | Satellite | Eli Dershwitz (USA) | Eliécer Romero (VEN) | Abraham Rodríguez (VEN); Jesús Carvajal (VEN) |
| 30 May 2015 | Sabre de Moscou, Moscow | Grand Prix | Tiberiu Dolniceanu (ROU) | Matyas Szabo (GER) | Tamás Decsi (HUN); Áron Szilágyi (HUN) |
| 6 June 2015 | European Championships, Montreux | Zone | Áron Szilágyi (HUN) | Max Hartung (GER) | Nikolay Kovalev (RUS); Aleksey Yakimenko (RUS) |
| 11 June 2015 | African Championships, Cairo | Zone | Mohamed Amer (EGY) | Yémi Apithy (BEN) | Fares Ferjani (TUN); Hichem Samandi (TUN) |
| 25 June 2015 | Asian Championships, Singapore | Zone | Kim Jung-hwan (KOR) | Gu Bon-gil (KOR) | Won Woo-young (KOR); Mojtaba Abedini (IRI) |
| 13 July 2015 | World Championships, Moscow | Worlds | Aleksey Yakimenko (RUS) | Daryl Homer (USA) | Tiberiu Dolniceanu (ROU); Max Hartung (GER) |

=== Women's sabre ===
| Date | Event | Type | Gold | Silver | Bronze |
|---|---|---|---|---|---|
| 12 October 2014 | Tournoi satellite, Bursa | Satellite | Olena Voronina (UKR) | Sabina Mikina (AZE) | Alina Komashchuk (UKR); Iryna Shchukla (UKR) |
| 1 November 2014 | World Cup, Isla Margarita | World Cup | Sofiya Velikaya (RUS) | Charlotte Lembach (FRA) | Mariel Zagunis (USA); Aleksandra Socha (POL) |
| 21 November 2014 | Trophée BNP Paribas, Orléans | World Cup | Sofiya Velikaya (RUS) | Rossella Gregorio (ITA) | Dagmara Wozniak (USA); Olena Kravatska (UKR) |
| 14 December 2015 | Grand Prix, New York | Grand Prix | Olha Kharlan (UKR) | Sofiya Velikaya (RUS) | Belén Pérez Maurice (ARG); Mariel Zagunis (USA) |
| 16 December 2015 | Tournoi satellite, Cancún | Satellite | Belén Pérez Maurice (ARG) | Paola Pliego (MEX) | Sage Palmedo (USA); Úrsula González (MEX) |
| 10 January 2015 | Tournoi satellite, Istanbul | Satellite | Sabina Mikina (AZE) | Sevil Bunyatova (AZE) | Ywen Lau (SIN); Ilgın Sarban (TUR) |
| 30 January 2015 | World Cup, Athens | World Cup | Olha Kharlan (UKR) | Sofiya Velikaya (RUS) | Dagmara Wozniak (USA); Rossella Gregorio (ITA) |
| 21 February 2015 | Challenge Yves Brasseur, Ghent | World Cup | Sofiya Velikaya (RUS) | Mariel Zagunis (USA) | Olha Kharlan (UKR); Anna Márton (HUN) |
| 21 March 2015 | Trophée satellite, Rome | Satellite | Tatyana Sukhova (RUS) | Evgenia Karbolina (RUS) | Rossy Felix Lara (DOM); Virginia Laurenti (ITA) |
| 28 March 2015 | Grand Prix, Seoul | Grand Prix | Olha Kharlan (UKR) | Ibtihaj Muhammad (USA) | Mariel Zagunis (USA); Sofiya Velikaya (RUS) |
| 19 April 2015 | Pan American Championships, Santiago | Zone Championships | Mariel Zagunis (USA) | Dagmara Wozniak (USA) | Anne-Elizabeth Stone (USA); Paola Pliego (MEX) |
| 25 April 2015 | Tournoi satellite, London | Satellite | Katherine Kempe (GBR) | Eileen Grench (PAN) | Olga Hramova (BUL); Ann Lee Huimin (SIN) |
| 2 May 2015 | World Cup, Beijing | Grand Prix | Sofiya Velikaya (RUS) | Aleksandra Socha (POL) | Olha Kharlan (UKR); Mariel Zagunis (USA) |
| 23 May 2015 | Tournoi satellite, Reykjavík | Satellite | Gabriella Page (CAN) | Belén Pérez Maurice (ARG) | Eileen Grench (PAN); Fatma Zehra Köse (TUR) |
| 30 May 2015 | Grand Prix, Moscow | Grand Prix | Olha Kharlan (UKR) | Yana Egorian (RUS) | Sofiya Velikaya (RUS); Yekaterina Dyachenko (RUS) |
| 6 June 2015 | European Championships, Montreux | Zone | Sofiya Velikaya (RUS) | Charlotte Lembach (FRA) | Rossella Gregorio (ITA); Olena Voronina (UKR) |
| 11 June 2015 | African Championships, Cairo | Zone | Azza Besbes (TUN) | Amira Ben Chaabane (TUN) | Mariam El Sawy (EGY); Héla Besbes (TUN) |
| 25 June 2015 | Asian Championships, Singapore | Zone | Shen Chen (CHN) | Chika Aoki (JPN) | Kim Ji-yeon (KOR); Misaki Emura (JPN) |
| 13 July 2015 | World Championships, Moscow | Worlds | Sofiya Velikaya (RUS) | Cécilia Berder (FRA) | Shen Chen (CHN); Anna Márton (HUN) |

== Team épée ==
=== Top 10 ===
Men
| 1 | France | 360 |
| 2 | South Korea | 338 |
| 3 | Ukraine | 312 |
| 4 | Switzerland | 296 |
| 5 | Russia | 222 |
| 6 | Germany | 219 |
| 7 | Hungary | 216 |
| 8 | Italy | 210 |
| 9 | Czech Republic | 183 |
| 10 | Kazakhstan | 177 |

Women
| 1 | China | 370 |
| 2 | Romania | 364 |
| 3 | Italy | 304 |
| 4 | Estonia | 249 |
| 5 | France | 230 |
| 6 | Russia | 228 |
| 7 | Sweden | 227 |
| 8 | Ukraine | 223 |
| 9 | United States | 215 |
| 10 | South Korea | 212 |

=== Men's team épée ===
| Date | Event | Gold | Silver | Bronze |
|---|---|---|---|---|
| 26 October 2014 | World Cup, Bern | France | Switzerland | South Korea |
| 16 November 2014 | World Cup, Tallinn | South Korea | France | Germany |
| 24 January 2015 | Heidenheimer Pokal, Heidenheim | South Korea | France | Russia |
| 15 February 2015 | World Cup, Vancouver | Switzerland | Ukraine | France |
| 22 February 2015 | Pan American Championships, Santiago | United States | Venezuela | Argentina |
| 3 May 2015 | Challenge SNCF Réseau, Paris | France | Germany | Russia |
| 6 June 2015 | European Championships, Montreux | France | Estonia | Switzerland |
| 11 June 2015 | African Championships, Cairo | Egypt | Morocco | Senegal |
| 25 June 2015 | Asian Championships, Singapore | Kazakhstan | China | Japan |
| 13 July 2015 | World Championships, Moscow | Ukraine | South Korea | Switzerland |

=== Women's team épée ===
| Date | Event | Gold | Silver | Bronze |
|---|---|---|---|---|
| 26 October 2014 | World Cup, Legnano | Estonia | Romania | Italy |
| 16 November 2014 | World Cup, Xuzhou | China | Italy | Sweden |
| 25 January 2014 | World Cup, Barcelona | Sweden | Italy | Romania |
| 15 February 2015 | World Cup, Buenos Aires | Italy | Romania | Germany |
| 21 February 2015 | Pan American Championships, Santiago | United States | Venezuela | Cuba |
| 3 May 2015 | World Cup, Johannesburg | China | Romania | France |
| 6 June 2015 | European Championships, Montreux | Romania | Estonia | Italy |
| 11 June 2015 | African Championships, Cairo | Tunisia | South Africa | Egypt |
| 25 June 2015 | Asian Championships, Singapore | South Korea | China | Japan |
| 13 July 2015 | World Championships, Moscow | China | Romania | Ukraine |

== Team foil ==
=== Top 10 ===
Men
| 1 | Russia | 388 |
| 2 | Italy | 352 |
| 3 | France | 324 |
| 4 | United States | 296 |
| 5 | China | 286 |
| 6 | South Korea | 228 |
| 7 | Germany | 214 |
| 8 | Japan | 211 |
| 9 | Great Britain | 210 |
| 10 | Egypt | 208 |

Women
| 1 | Russia | 412 |
| 2 | Italy | 400 |
| 3 | United States | 380 |
| 4 | France | 272 |
| 5 | South Korea | 268 |
| 6 | Germany | 224 |
| 7 | China | 210 |
| 8 | Canada | 200 |
| 9 | Hungary | 200 |
| 10 | Poland | 200 |

=== Men's team foil ===
| Date | Event | Gold | Silver | Bronze |
|---|---|---|---|---|
| 19 October 2014 | World Cup, San Francisco | Italy | Russia | Germany |
| 9 November 2014 | World Cup, Tokyo | Russia | France | South Korea |
| 18 January 2015 | Challenge Rommel, Paris | United States | Italy | Russia |
| 8 February 2015 | Löwe von Bonn, Bonn | France | Russia | United States |
| 21 February 2015 | Pan American Championships, Santiago | United States | Brazil | Canada |
| 3 May 2015 | World Cup, Saint-Petersburg | Russia | China | Italy |
| 6 June 2015 | European Championships, Montreux | France | Russia | Germany |
| 11 June 2015 | African Championships, Cairo | Egypt | Tunisia | Algeria |
| 25 June 2015 | Asian Championships, Singapore | China | South Korea | Japan |
| 13 July 2015 | World Championships, Moscow | Italy | Russia | China |

=== Women's team foil ===
| Date | Event | Gold | Silver | Bronze |
|---|---|---|---|---|
| 19 October 2014 | World Cup, Cancún | Russia | France | Italy |
| 9 November 2014 | World Cup, Saint-Maur | Russia | Italy | France |
| 18 January 2015 | World Cup, Gdańsk | Russia | United States | Italy |
| 8 February 2015 | World Cup, Algiers | Italy | Russia | Germany |
| 23 February 2015 | Pan American Championships, Santiago | United States | Canada | Venezuela |
| 3 May 2015 | World Cup, Tauberbischofsheim | Russia | Italy | South Korea |
| 6 June 2015 | European Championships, Montreux | Italy | Russia | France |
| 11 June 2015 | African Championships, Cairo | Tunisia | Algeria | Egypt |
| 25 June 2015 | Asian Championships, Singapore | South Korea | China | Hong Kong |
| 13 July 2015 | World Championships, Moscow | Italy | Russia | France |

== Team sabre ==
=== Top 10 ===
Men
| 1 | Italy | 360 |
| 2 | Russia | 308 |
| 3 | Germany | 306 |
| 4 | South Korea | 266 |
| 5 | Romania | 244 |
| 6 | Hungary | 242 |
| 7 | France | 242 |
| 8 | United States | 224 |
| 9 | China | 194 |
| 10 | Iran | 192 |

Women
| 1 | Russia | 396 |
| 2 | United States | 340 |
| 3 | Ukraine | 315 |
| 4 | France | 304 |
| 5 | Italy | 272 |
| 6 | South Korea | 242 |
| 7 | Poland | 226 |
| 8 | China | 211 |
| 9 | Mexico | 187 |
| 10 | Japan | 181 |

=== Men's team sabre ===
| Date | Event | Gold | Silver | Bronze |
|---|---|---|---|---|
| 23 November 2014 | World Cup, Budapest | Romania | Italy | Germany |
| 1 February 2015 | World Cup, Padova | Russia | Germany | Italy |
| 22 February 2015 | World Cup, Warsaw | France | South Korea | Russia |
| 23 February 2015 | Pan American Championships, Santiago | United States | Canada | Venezuela |
| 3 May 2015 | World Cup, Madrid | Hungary | Italy | Germany |
| 6 June 2015 | European Championships, Montreux | Germany | Italy | Hungary |
| 11 June 2015 | African Championships, Cairo | Egypt | Tunisia | Senegal |
| 25 June 2015 | Asian Championships, Singapore | South Korea | Iran | China |
| 13 July 2015 | World Championships, Moscow | Italy | Russia | Germany |

=== Women's team sabre ===
| Date | Event | Gold | Silver | Bronze |
|---|---|---|---|---|
| 2 November 2014 | World Cup, Isla Margarita | United States | Russia | France |
| 23 November 2014 | World Cup, Orléans | Russia | United States | Italy |
| 1 February 2015 | World Cup, Athens | Ukraine | Russia | United States |
| 22 February 2015 | World Cup, Ghent | Italy | France | United States |
| 22 February 2015 | Pan American Championships, Santiago | United States | Mexico | Venezuela |
| 3 May 2015 | World Cup, Beijing | France | Ukraine | United States |
| 6 June 2015 | European Championships, Montreux | Russia | France | Ukraine |
| 11 June 2015 | African Championships, Cairo | Tunisia | Egypt | Algeria |
| 25 June 2015 | Asian Championships, Singapore | South Korea | China | Japan |
| 13 July 2015 | World Championships, Moscow | Russia | Ukraine | United States |
