= 2015–16 Fencing World Cup =

International fencing competition

The 45th FIE Fencing World Cup began in October 2015 and concluded in August 2016 at the 2016 Summer Olympics held in Rio de Janeiro. The International Fencing Federation being allocated only ten events by the International Olympic Committee, as opposed to twelve in major fencing competitions, two team events – in this case, women's team foil and men's team sabre — will be disputed as World Championships, held in Rio in April 2016. They also serve as test event for the organisation of the Olympic events.

== Individual épée ==
=== Top 10 ===
Men
1	(France) Gauthier Grumier	207
2	(France) Yannick Borel	169
3	(South Korea) Park Sang-young	163
4	(Hungary) Géza Imre	162
5	(Italy) Enrico Garozzo	156
6	(Ukraine) Bohdan Nikishyn	140
7	(Japan) Kazuyasu Minobe	140
8	(Switzerland) Benjamin Steffen	132
9	(Russia) Vadim Anokhin	131
10	(Switzerland) Max Heinzer	125

Women
1	(Hungary) Emese Szász	201
2	(Tunisia) Sarra Besbes	179
3	(China) Xu Anqi	177
4	(Russia) Tatiana Logunova	169
5	(China) Sun Yiwen	165
6	(Romania) Ana Maria Brânză	143
7	(Italy) Rossella Fiamingo	141
8	(Italy) Mara Navarria	124
9	(Estonia) Irina Embrich	116
10	(South Korea) Shin A-lam	111

=== Men's épée ===
Date	Event	Type	Gold	Silver	Bronze
3 October 2015	Tournoi Clarins, Geneva	Satellite	Ronan Gustin (FRA)	Andrea Baroglio (ITA)	Fabian Kauter (SUI); Steeven Seloi (FRA)
10 October 2015	Belgrade Trophy, Belgrade	Satellite	Aleksey Kalinin (RUS)	Anatoliy Herey (UKR)	Grigori Beskin (ISR); Ido Herpe (ISR)
17 October 2015	Kupittaa Tournament, Turku	Satellite	Jüri Salm (EST)	Ariel Simmons (USA)	Pavel Dubouski (BLR); Dzianis Dubouski (BLR)
23 October 2015	Coupe du monde, Bern	World Cup	Bas Verwijlen (NED)	Daniel Jérent (FRA)	Nikolai Novosjolov (EST); Péter Somfai (HUN)
31 October 2015	Satellite, Oslo	Satellite	Dennis Kraft (USA)	Bartosz Piasecki (NOR)	Jüri Salm (EST); Radosław Zawrotniak (POL)
7 November 2015	Trekanten Open, Copenhagen	Satellite	Dmitriy Aleksanin (KAZ)	Frederik von der Osten (DEN)	Ivan Deryabin (KAZ); Tomas Curran Jones (GBR)
13 November 2015	Glaive de Tallinn, Tallinn	World Cup	Kazuyasu Minobe (JPN)	Satoru Uyama (JPN)	Enrico Garozzo (ITA); Gauthier Grumier (FRA)
28 November 2015	Tournoi satellite, Dublin	Satellite	Bas Verwijlen (NED)	Mateusz Antkiewicz (POL)	Lim Wei Wen (SIN); Uroš Balent (SLO)
4 December 2015	Grand Prix du Qatar, Doha	Grand Prix	Vadim Anokhin (RUS)	Fabian Kauter (SUI)	Yannick Borel (FRA); Bas Verwijlen (NED)
9 January 2016	SAF Pokalen, Stockholm	Satellite	Jüri Salm (EST)	Benjamin Bratton (USA)	Yeisser Ramirez (USA); Niko Vuorinen (FIN)
21 January 2016	Heidenheimer Pokal, Heidenheim	World Cup	Gauthier Grumier (FRA)	Bohdan Nikishyn (UKR)	Jean-Michel Lucenay (FRA); Anton Avdeev (RUS)
12 February 2016	Coupe du Monde, Vancouver	World Cup	Enrico Garozzo (ITA)	Constantin Böhm (GER)	Park Sang-young (KOR); Yuval Shalom Freilich (ISR)
12 March 2016	Tournoi satellite, Sofia	Satellite	Yeisser Ramirez (USA)	Frederik von der Osten (DEN)	Fong Kiu (HKG); Jhon Édison Rodríguez (COL)
18 March 2016	Westend Grand Prix in Memoriam Vass Imre, Budapest	Grand Prix	Gauthier Grumier (FRA)	Enrico Garozzo (ITA)	Kweon Young-jun (KOR); Gábor Boczkó (HUN)
13 April 2016	Asian Championships, Wuxi	Zone Championships	Park Kyoung-doo (KOR)	Park Sang-young (KOR)	Kazuyasu Minobe (JPN); Shi Gaofeng (CHN)
15 April 2016	African Championships, Algiers	Zone Championships	Alexandre Bouzaid (SEN)	Ayman Fayez (EGY)	Mahmoud Mohsen (EGY); Ahmed Elsaghir (EGY)
22 April 2016	Grand Prix, Rio de Janeiro	Grand Prix	Bohdan Nikishyn (UKR)	Benjamin Steffen (SUI)	Park Kyoung-doo (KOR); Anatoliy Herey (UKR)
14 May 2016	Kup Svetog Duje, Split	Satellite	Matteo Tagliariol (ITA)	Francisco Limardo (VEN)	Jesus Andres Lugones Ruggeri (ARG); Gustavo Coqueco (COL)
20 May 2016	Challenge SNCF Réseau, Paris	World Cup	Gauthier Grumier (FRA)	Pavel Sukhov (RUS)	Géza Imre (HUN); Daniel Jerent (FRA)
21 June 2016	European Championships, Toruń	Zone Championships	Yannick Borel (FRA)	Max Heinzer (SUI)	Jean-Michel Lucenay (FRA); Bohdan Nikishyn (UKR)
22 June 2016	Pan American Championships, Panama City	Zone Championships	Yunior Reytor Venet (CUB)	Jason Pryor (USA)	Reynier Henriquez Ortiz (CUB); Maxime Brinck-Croteau (CAN)
9 August 2016	Olympic Games, Rio de Janeiro	Olympics	Park Sang-young (KOR)	Géza Imre (HUN)	Gauthier Grumier (FRA)

=== Women's épée ===
Date	Event	Type	Gold	Silver	Bronze
10 October 2015	Belgrade Trophy, Belgrade	Satellite	Romana Caran (SRB)	Joanna Halls (AUS)	Kinka Barvestad (SWE); Tončica Topić (CRO)
18 October 2015	Kupittaa Tournament, Turku	Satellite	Ayaka Shimookawa (JPN)	Kinka Barvestad (SWE)	Anna Salminen (FIN); Emma Samuelsson (SWE)
23 October 2015	Trofeo Carroccio, Legnano	World Cup	Sun Yiwen (CHN)	Kristina Kuusk (EST)	Emese Szász (HUN); Violetta Kolobova (RUS)
1 November 2015	Tournoi satellite, Oslo	Satellite	Renata Knapik (POL)	Magdalena Piekarska (POL)	Åsa Linde (SWE); Magdalena Pawłowska (POL)
8 November 2015	Trekanten Open, Copenhagen	Satellite	Ayaka Shimookawa (JPN)	Julia Kirschen (GER)	Nicol Foietta (ITA); Dagmar Cipárová (SVK)
13 November 2015	Tournoi International, Nanjing	World Cup	Ana-Maria Popescu (ROU)	Sarra Besbes (TUN)	Irina Embrich (EST); Shin A-lam (KOR)
5 December 2015	Grand Prix du Qatar, Doha	Grand Prix	Mara Navarria (ITA)	Britta Heidemann (GER)	Yana Zvereva (RUS); Tatyana Logunova (RUS)
10 January 2016	Rehbinder Prize, Stockholm	Satellite	Nelli Paju (EST)	Emma Samuelsson (SWE)	Kristina Kuusk (EST); Renata Knapik-Miazga (POL)
22 January 2016	Ciutat de Barcelona, Barcelona	World Cup	Mara Navarria (ITA)	Lauren Rembi (FRA)	Ana-Maria Popescu (ROU); Lyubov Shutova (RUS)
12 February 2016	Coupe du Monde, Buenos Aires	World Cup	Violetta Kolobova (RUS)	Irina Embrich (EST)	Emma Samuelsson (SWE); Simona Gherman (ROU)
12 March 2016	Tournoi satellite, Sofia	Satellite	Dora Kiskapusi (ESP)	Chang Chia-ling (TPE)	Avital Marinuk (ISR); Vivian Kong (HKG)
18 March 2016	Westend Grand Prix in Memoriam József Sákovics, Budapest	Grand Prix	Xu Anqi (CHN)	Sarra Besbes (TUN)	Tatyana Andryushina (RUS); Tatiana Logunova (RUS)
13 April 2016	Asian Championships, Wuxi	Zone Championships	Sun Yujie (CHN)	Xu Anqi (CHN)	Kang Young-mi (KOR); Shin A-lam (KOR)
15 April 2016	African Championships, Algiers	Zone Championships	Sarra Besbes (TUN)	Gbahi Gwladys Sakoa (CIV)	Maya Mansouri (TUN); Nedjma Djouad (ALG)
22 April 2016	Grand Prix, Rio de Janeiro	Grand Prix	Tatiana Logunova (RUS)	Xu Anqi (CHN)	Katrina Lehis (EST); Olga Kochneva (RUS)
8 May 2016	Cole Cup, London	Satellite	Hannah Elizabeth Lawrence (GBR)	Paulina Bajorunaite (LTU)	Marina Bochenkova (USA); Katrina Smith (GBR)
14 May 2016	Kup Svetog Duje, Split	Satellite	Leonora Mackinnon (CAN)	Dagmar Cipárová (SVK)	Tončica Topić (CRO); Maria Martinez (VEN)
20 May 2016	World Cup, Legnano	World Cup	Erika Kirpu (EST)	Giulia Rizzi (ITA)	Tatyana Andryushina (RUS); Vivian Kong (HKG)
21 June 2016	Pan American Championships, Panama City	Zone Championships	Kelley Hurley (USA)	Maria Martinez (VEN)	Courtney Hurley (USA); Katharine Holmes (USA)
22 June 2016	European Championships, Toruń	Zone Championships	Simona Gherman (ROU)	Ana Maria Brânză (ROU)	Renata Knapik-Miazga (POL); Emese Szász (HUN)
6 August 2016	Olympic Games, Rio de Janeiro	Olympics	Emese Szász (HUN)	Rossella Fiamingo (ITA)	Sun Yiwen (CHN)

== Individual foil ==
=== Top 10 ===
Men
1	(United States) Alexander Massialas	253
2	(Italy) Daniele Garozzo	189
3	(United Kingdom) Richard Kruse	177
4	(Russia) Timur Safin	172
5	(Italy) Giorgio Avola	150
6	(United Kingdom) James-Andrew Davis	147
7	(China) Ma Jianfei	147
8	(United States) Gerek Meinhardt	134
9	(Egypt) Alaaeldin Abouelkassem	133
10	(China) Chen Haiwei	129

Women
1	(Italy) Arianna Errigo	262
2	(Russia) Inna Deriglazova	233
3	(Italy) Elisa Di Francisca	218
4	(United States) Lee Kiefer	202
5	(France) Ysaora Thibus	172
6	(Russia) Aida Shanaeva	164
7	(Tunisia) Inès Boubakri	158
8	(France) Astrid Guyart	121
9	(Italy) Martina Batini	120
10	(Italy) Alice Volpi	108

=== Men's foil ===
Date	Event	Type	Gold	Silver	Bronze
16 October 2015	Coupe du Monde, San Jose	World Cup	Timur Safin (RUS)	James-Andrew Davis (GBR)	Jérémy Cadot (FRA); Yuki Ota (JPN)
6 November 2015	Prince Takamodo World Cup, Tokyo	World Cup	Alexander Massialas (USA)	Heo Jun (KOR)	Gerek Meinhardt (USA); Yuki Ota (JPN)
27 November 2015	Trofeo Inalpi, Turin	Grand Prix	Ma Jianfei (CHN)	Richard Kruse (GBR)	Lee Kwang-hyun (KOR); Lorenzo Nista (ITA)
12 December 2015	Tournoi satellite, Kocaeli	Satellite	René Pranz (AUT)	Tomer Or (ISR)	Yaser Mohammad (IOC); Martino Minuto (TUR)
10 January 2016	Leon Paul Cup, London	Satellite	Peter Joppich (GER)	Alexander Choupenitch (CZE)	Daniel Gómez (MEX); Moritz Kröplin (GER)
15 January 2016	Challenge International de Paris, Paris	World Cup	Race Imboden (USA)	Peter Joppich (GER)	Gerek Meinhardt (USA); Dmitry Rigin (RUS)
5 February 2016	Löwe von Bonn, Bonn	World Cup	James-Andrew Davis (GBR)	Miles Chamley-Watson (USA)	Daniele Garozzo (ITA); Erwann Le Péchoux (FRA)
6 March 2016	Satellite tournament, Cancún	Satellite	Tomer Or (ISR)	Maor Hatoel (ISR)	Maximilien Van Haaster (CAN); Juvenal Alarcón (CHI)
11 March 2016	Grand Prix, Havana	Grand Prix	Richard Kruse (GBR)	Alaaeldin Abouelkassem (EGY)	Race Imboden (USA); Jean-Paul Tony Helissey (FRA)
13 April 2016	Asian Championships, Wuxi	Zone Championships	Cheung Ka Long (HKG)	Takahiro Shikine (JPN)	Kwon Young-ho (KOR); Lei Sheng (CHN)
15 April 2016	African Championships, Algiers	Zone Championships	Alaaeldin Abouelkassem (EGY)	Victor Sintes (ALG)	Mohamed Samandi (TUN); Tarek Ayad (EGY)
13 May 2016	Fleuret de Saint-Pétersbourg, Saint Petersburg	World Cup	Dmitry Zherebchenko (RUS)	Dmitry Rigin (RUS)	James-Andrew Davis (GBR); Andrea Baldini (ITA)
3 June 2016	Grand Prix, Shanghai	Grand Prix	Alexander Massialas (USA)	Lee Kwang-hyun (KOR)	Chen Haiwei (CHN); Alessio Foconi (ITA)
20 June 2016	European Championships, Toruń	Zone Championships	Timur Safin (RUS)	Erwann Le Péchoux (FRA)	Giorgio Avola (ITA); Andre Sanita (GER)
21 June 2016	Pan American Championships, Panama City	Zone Championships	Alexander Massialas (USA)	Daniel Gómez (MEX)	Race Imboden (USA); Miles Chamley-Watson (USA)
7 August 2016	Olympic Games, Rio de Janeiro	Olympics	Daniele Garozzo (ITA)	Alexander Massialas (USA)	Timur Safin (RUS)

=== Women's foil ===
Date	Event	Type	Gold	Silver	Bronze
13 October 2015	Tournoi satellite, Cancún	Satellite	Eleanor Harvey (CAN)	Saskia Loretta Van Erven Garcia (COL)	Alanna Goldie (CAN); Marika Chrzanowska (POL)
16 October 2015	World Cup, Cancún	World Cup	Ysaora Thibus (FRA)	Alice Volpi (ITA)	Elisa Di Francisca (ITA); Martina Batini (ITA)
6 November 2015	World Cup, Saint-Maur	World Cup	Arianna Errigo (ITA)	Elisa Di Francisca (ITA)	Lee Kiefer (USA); Carolin Golubytskyi (GER)
14 November 2015	Tournoi satellite, Ankara	Satellite	Eleanor Harvey (CAN)	Mălina Călugăreanu (ROU)	Mona Shaito (LIB); Isis Giménez (VEN)
27 November 2015	Trofeo Inalpi, Turin	Grand Prix	Alice Volpi (ITA)	Inna Deriglazova (RUS)	Arianna Errigo (ITA); Adelina Zagidullina (RUS)
12 December 2015	Tournoi satellite, Kocaeli	Satellite	Eleanor Harvey (CAN)	Gabriella Varga (HUN)	Olha Leleyko (UKR); Aleksandra Senyuta (UKR)
15 January 2016	Artus Court PKO BP, Gdańsk	World Cup	Arianna Errigo (ITA)	Aida Shanayeva (RUS)	Inna Deriglazova (RUS); Martina Batini (ITA)
5 February 2016	World Cup, Algiers	World Cup	Elisa Di Francisca (ITA)	Martina Batini (ITA)	Arianna Errigo (ITA); Inna Deriglazova (RUS)
11 March 2016	Grand Prix, Havana	Grand Prix	Arianna Errigo (ITA)	Lee Kiefer (USA)	Nam Hyun-hee (KOR); Diana Yakovleva (RUS)
13 April 2016	Asian Championships, Wuxi	Zone Championships	Nam Hyun-hee (KOR)	Le Huilin (CHN)	Minami Kano (JPN); Kim Mi-na (KOR)
15 April 2016	African Championships, Algiers	Zone Championships	Inès Boubakri (TUN)	Anissa Khelfaoui (ALG)	Haifa Jabri (TUN); Youssra Zakarani (MAR)
8 May 2016	Tournoi satellite, Copenhagen	Satellite	Isis Giménez (VEN)	Michala Cellerova (SVK)	Linn Lofmark (SWE); Olivia Wohlgemuth (AUT)
20 May 2016	World Cup, Tauberbischofsheim	World Cup	Inna Deriglazova (RUS)	Arianna Errigo (ITA)	Elisa Di Francisca (ITA); Lee Kiefer (USA)
3 June 2016	Grand Prix, Shanghai	Grand Prix	Arianna Errigo (ITA)	Lee Kiefer (USA)	Martina Batini (ITA); Ysaora Thibus (FRA)
21 June 2016	European Championships, Toruń	Zone Championships	Arianna Errigo (ITA)	Aida Shanaeva (RUS)	Larisa Korobeynikova (RUS); Carolin Golubytskyi (GER)
23 June 2016	Pan American Championships, Panama City	Zone Championships	Lee Kiefer (USA)	Nicole Ross (USA)	Alanna Goldie (CAN); Kelleigh Ryan (CAN)
10 August 2016	Olympic Games, Rio de Janeiro	Olympics	Inna Deriglazova (RUS)	Elisa Di Francisca (ITA)	Inès Boubakri (TUN)

== Individual sabre ==
=== Top 10 ===
Men
1	(South Korea) Kim Jung-hwan	243
2	(Hungary) Áron Szilágyi	219
3	(France) Vincent Anstett	181
4	(Russia) Aleksey Yakimenko	169
5	(Russia) Nikolay Kovalev	151
6	(Iran) Mojtaba Abedini	149
7	(South Korea) Gu Bon-gil	139
8	(United States) Daryl Homer	135
9	(Romania) Tiberiu Dolniceanu	134
10	(United States) Eli Dershwitz	126

Women
1	(Russia) Sofiya Velikaya	253
2	(Russia) Yana Egorian	243
3	(Ukraine) Olha Kharlan	242
4	(United States) Mariel Zagunis	200
5	(South Korea) Kim Ji-yeon	163
6	(Hungary) Anna Márton	147
7	(United States) Ibtihaj Muhammad	140
8	(China) Shen Chen	127
9	(France) Manon Brunet	121
10	(Tunisia) Azza Besbes	119

=== Men's sabre ===
Date	Event	Type	Gold	Silver	Bronze
9 October 2015	World Cup, Tbilisi	World Cup	Aleksey Yakimenko (RUS)	Tiberiu Dolniceanu (ROU)	Nicolas Limbach (GER); Andriy Yagodka (UKR)
18 October 2015	Satellite, Ghent	Satellite	Seppe van Holsbeke (BEL)	Eliecer Romero (VEN)	Joseph Polossifakis (CAN); Alexander Crutchett (GBR)
30 October 2015	World Cup, Budapest	World Cup	Aleksey Yakimenko (RUS)	Kim Jung-hwan (KOR)	Kamil Ibragimov (RUS); Nicolas Rousset (FRA)
8 November 2015	Satellite, Amsterdam	Satellite	Joseph Polossifakis (CAN)	James Honeybone (GBR)	Alin Badea (ROU); Jesús Carvajal (VEN)
12 December 2015	Absolute Fencing Gear Sabre Grand Prix, Boston	Grand Prix	Aldo Montano (ITA)	Áron Szilágyi (HUN)	Tiberiu Dolniceanu (ROU); Benedikt Wagner (GER)
9 January 2015	Satellite, Istanbul	Satellite	Sandro Bazadze (GEO)	Joseph Polossifakis (CAN)	Mikheil Mardaleishvili (GEO); Beka Bazadze (GEO)
29 January 2016	Luxardo Trophy, Padova	World Cup	Aldo Montano (ITA)	Áron Szilágyi (HUN)	Kim Jung-hwan (KOR); Kamil Ibragimov (RUS)
19 February 2016	Sabre de Wolodyjowski, Warsaw	World Cup	Gu Bon-gil (KOR)	Kim Jun-ho (KOR)	Aliaksandr Buikevich (BLR); Kamil Ibragimov (RUS)
12 March 2015	Normann Jørgensen Cup, Copenhagen	Satellite	Alin Badea (ROU)	James Honeybone (GBR)	Enver Yıldırım (TUR); Ricardo Bustamante (ARG)
25 March 2016	Grand Prix, Seoul	Grand Prix	Eli Dershwitz (USA)	Mojtaba Abedini (IRI)	Diego Occhiuzzi (ITA); Nikolay Kovalev (RUS)
13 April 2016	Asian Championships, Wuxi	Zone Championships	Kim Jung-hwan (KOR)	Ali Pakdaman (IRI)	Vũ Thành An (VIE); Xu Yingming (CHN)
15 April 2016	African Championships, Algiers	Zone Championships	Mohab Samer (EGY)	Fares Ferjani (TUN)	Hichem Samandi (TUN); Mostafa Ayman (EGY)
7 May 2016	Cole Cup, London	Satellite	Joseph Polossifakis (CAN)	James Honeybone (GBR)	William Deary (GBR); Jonathan Webb (GBR)
13 May 2016	Villa de Madrid, Madrid	World Cup	Vincent Anstett (FRA)	Sandro Bazadze (GEO)	Kim Jung-hwan (KOR); Luca Curatoli (ITA)
22 May 2016	Tournoi satellite, Reykjavík	Satellite	Teddy Weller (ISV)	Julián Ayala (MEX)	Gunnar Egill Agustsson (ISL); Jan-Ole Huelshoerster (GER)
27 May 2016	Sabre de Moscou, Moscow	Grand Prix	Kim Jung-hwan (KOR)	Xu Yingming (CHN)	Vincent Anstett (FRA); Nikolay Kovalev (RUS)
22 June 2016	European Championships, Toruń	Zone Championships	Benedikt Wagner (GER)	Vincent Anstett (FRA)	Kamil Ibragimov (RUS); Alexey Yakimenko (RUS)
23 June 2016	Pan American Championships, Panama City	Zone Championships	Renzo Agresta (BRA)	Andrew Mackiewicz (USA)	Eli Dershwitz (USA); Jose Quintero (VEN)
10 August 2016	Olympic Games, Rio de Janeiro	Olympics	Áron Szilágyi (HUN)	Daryl Homer (USA)	Kim Jung-hwan (KOR)

=== Women's sabre ===
Date	Event	Type	Gold	Silver	Bronze
10 October 2015	World Cup, Caracas	World Cup	Mariel Zagunis (USA)	Seo Ji-yeon (KOR)	Rossella Gregorio (ITA); Manon Brunet (FRA)
30 October 2015	Trophée BNP Paribas, Orléans	World Cup	Yana Egorian (RUS)	Olha Kharlan (UKR)	Yoon Ji-su (KOR); Ibtihaj Muhammad (USA)
12 December 2015	Absolute Fencing Gear Sabre Grand Prix, Boston	Grand Prix	Shen Chen (CHN)	Viktoriya Kovaleva (RUS)	Sabina Mikina (AZE); Sofiya Velikaya (RUS)
15 December 2015	Tournoi satellite, Cancún	Satellite	Belén Pérez Maurice (ARG)	Paola Pliego (MEX)	Tania Arrayales (MEX); Alejandra Benítez (VEN)
9 January 2016	Tournoi satellite, Istanbul	Satellite	Belén Pérez Maurice (ARG)	Au Sin Ying (HKG)	Gabriella Page (CAN); Fatma Zehra Köse (TUR)
29 January 2016	World Cup, Athens	World Cup	Mariel Zagunis (USA)	Sofiya Velikaya (RUS)	Ibtihaj Muhammad (USA); Ekaterina Dyachenko (RUS)
19 February 2016	SGK Ladies World Cup, Sint-Niklaas	World Cup	Olha Kharlan (UKR)	Yana Egorian (RUS)	Sofiya Velikaya (RUS); Kim Ji-yeon (KOR)
19 March 2016	Trophée satellite, Rome	Satellite	Flaminia Prearo (ITA)	Belén Pérez Maurice (ARG)	Patricia Contreras (VEN); Paola Pliego (MEX)
25 March 2016	Grand Prix, Seoul	Grand Prix	Yana Egorian (RUS)	Seo Ji-yeon (KOR)	Sofiya Velikaya (RUS); Vassiliki Vougiouka (GRE)
13 April 2016	Asian Championships, Wuxi	Zone Championships	Hwang Seon-a (KOR)	Shao Yaqi (CHN)	Kim Ji-yeon (KOR); Yoon Ji-su (KOR)
15 April 2016	African Championships, Algiers	Zone Championships	Azza Besbes (TUN)	Mennatalla Ahmed (EGY)	Sarah Atrouz (ALG); Abik Boungab (ALG)
7 May 2016	Tournoi satellite, London	Satellite	Marta Baeza Centurion (BRA)	Olga A. Hramova (BUL)	Kate Daykin (GBR); Jessica Corby (GBR)
13 May 2016	World Cup, Foshan	World Cup	Olha Kharlan (UKR)	Kim Ji-yeon (KOR)	Mariel Zagunis (USA); Qian Jiarui (CHN)
21 May 2016	Tournoi satellite, Reykjavík	Satellite	Tania Arrayales (MEX)	Laia Vila (ESP)	Julieta Toledo (MEX); Úrsula González Zárate (MEX)
28 May 2016	Grand Prix, Moscow	Grand Prix	Olha Kharlan (UKR)	Mariel Zagunis (USA)	Yuliya Gavrilova (RUS); Irene Vecchi (ITA)
20 June 2016	European Championships, Toruń	Zone Championships	Sofiya Velikaya (RUS)	Anna Márton (HUN)	Olha Kharlan (UKR); Charlotte Lembach (FRA)
22 June 2016	Pan American Championships, Panama City	Zone Champuonships	Ibtihaj Muhammad (USA)	Mariel Zagunis (USA)	Paola Pliego (MEX); Belén Pérez Maurice (ARG)
8 August 2016	Olympic Games, Rio de Janeiro	Olympics	Yana Egorian (RUS)	Sofiya Velikaya (RUS)	Olha Kharlan (UKR)

== Team épée ==
=== Top 10 ===
Men
1	France	412
2	Italy	344
3	Ukraine	288
4	Hungary	269
5	Russia	231
6	Switzerland	225
7	South Korea	222
8	Venezuela	213
9	Japan	166
10	Kazakhstan	154

Women
1	Romania	364
2	Russia	344
3	China	324
4	Estonia	312
5	South Korea	278
6	United States	252
7	France	219
8	Ukraine	187
9	Italy	144
10	Japan	137

=== Men's team épée ===
Date	Event	Gold	Silver	Bronze
25 October 2015	World Cup, Bern	Russia	France	Italy
15 November 2015	World Cup, Tallinn	France	Italy	Switzerland
23 January 2016	Heidenheimer Pokal, Heidenheim	Italy	France	Switzerland
14 February 2016	World Cup, Vancouver	Hungary	Kazakhstan	Ukraine
13 April 2016	Asian Championships, Wuxi	Japan	South Korea	Kazakhstan
15 April 2016	African Championships, Algiers	Egypt	Senegal	Algeria
22 May 2016	Challenge SNCF Réseau, Paris	Ukraine	France	Hungary
24 June 2016	European Championships, Toruń	France	Italy	Ukraine
25 June 2016	Pan American Championships, Panama City	Venezuela	Cuba	Colombia
14 August 2016	Olympic Games, Rio de Janeiro	France	Italy	Hungary

=== Women's team épée ===
Date	Event	Gold	Silver	Bronze
25 October 2015	World Cup, Legnano	Russia	Romania	United States
15 November 2015	World Cup, Nanjing	Russia	South Korea	United States
24 January 2015	World Cup, Barcelona	Estonia	Russia	South Korea
12 February 2016	World Cup, Buenos Aires	Romania	Russia	Estonia
13 April 2016	Asian Championships, Wuxi	South Korea	China	Hong Kong
15 April 2016	African Championships, Algiers	Egypt	Tunisia	Algeria
22 May 2016	World Cup, Legnano	China	Romania	Estonia
24 June 2016	Pan American Championships, Panama City	Canada	United States	Brazil
25 June 2016	European Championships, Toruń	Estonia	France	Romania
11 August 2016	Olympic Games, Rio de Janeiro	Romania	China	Russia

== Team foil ==
=== Top 10 ===
Men
1	United States	364
2	Russia	354
3	France	336
4	Italy	328
5	China	250
6	United Kingdom	227
7	Egypt	212
8	Brazil	190
9	South Korea	186
10	Japan	182

Women
1	Russia	424
2	Italy	400
3	United States	276
4	France	266
5	South Korea	258
6	China	223
7	Germany	218
8	Canada	208
9	Hungary	204
10	Poland	190

=== Men's team foil ===
Date	Event	Gold	Silver	Bronze
18 October 2015	World Cup, San Jose	France	Japan	United States
8 November 2015	World Cup, Tokyo	United States	France	China
17 January 2016	Challenge Rommel, Paris	United States	Italy	Great Britain
7 February 2016	Löwe von Bonn, Bonn	Russia	Italy	France
13 April 2016	Asian Championships, Wuxi	South Korea	China	Japan
15 April 2016	African Championships, Algiers	Egypt	Tunisia	Algeria
15 May 2016	World Cup, Saint Petersburg	Italy	United States	France
23 June 2016	European Championships, Toruń	Russia	Italy	Great Britain
24 June 2016	Pan American Championships, Panama City	United States	Brazil	Canada
12 August 2016	Olympic Games, Rio de Janeiro	Russia	France	United States

=== Women's team foil ===
Date	Event	Gold	Silver	Bronze
18 October 2015	World Cup, Cancún	Italy	Russia	United States
8 November 2015	World Cup, Saint-Maur	Italy	Russia	France
17 January 2016	World Cup, Gdańsk	Italy	Russia	Germany
7 February 2016	World Cup, Algiers	Russia	Italy	United States
13 April 2016	Asian Championships, Wuxi	China	South Korea	Japan
15 April 2016	African Championships, Algiers	Tunisia	Algeria	–
25 April 2016	World Championships, Rio de Janeiro	Russia	Italy	France
22 May 2016	World Cup, Tauberbischofsheim	Russia	Italy	France
24 June 2016	European Championships, Toruń	Russia	Italy	France
26 June 2016	Pan American Championships, Panama City	United States	Canada	Mexico

== Team sabre ==
=== Top 10 ===
Men
1	Russia	374
2	United States	348
3	Hungary	312
4	Germany	272
5	Romania	264
6	South Korea	254
7	Italy	244
8	France	214
9	Iran	203
10	China	192

Women
1	Russia	424
2	Ukraine	364
3	France	300
4	United States	274
5	Italy	244
6	South Korea	238
7	Poland	236
8	Mexico	189
9	China	170
10	Japan	133

=== Men's team sabre ===
Date	Event	Gold	Silver	Bronze
11 October 2015	World Cup, Tbilisi	United States	France	Germany
1 November 2015	World Cup, Budapest	Russia	United States	Hungary
31 January 2016	World Cup, Padova	Hungary	Romania	South Korea
21 February 2016	World Cup, Warsaw	United States	Russia	Germany
13 April 2016	Asian Championships, Wuxi	South Korea	China	Vietnam
15 April 2016	African Championships, Algiers	Tunisia	Egypt	Algeria
25 April 2016	World Championships, Rio de Janeiro	Russia	Hungary	Romania
15 May 2016	World Cup, Madrid	Germany	United States	Hungary
25 June 2016	European Championships, Toruń	Russia	Italy	Romania
26 June 2016	Pan American Championships, Panama City	United States	Argentina	Mexico

=== Women's team sabre ===
Date	Event	Gold	Silver	Bronze
11 October 2015	World Cup, Caracas	Russia	Ukraine	Poland
1 November 2015	World Cup, Orléans	Ukraine	Russia	France
31 January 2016	World Cup, Athens	Ukraine	Russia	France
21 February 2016	World Cup, Ghent	Russia	France	Ukraine
13 April 2016	Asian Championships, Wuxi	China	South Korea	Japan
15 April 2016	African Championships, Algiers	Tunisia	Algeria	Egypt
15 May 2016	World Cup, Foshan	France	Russia	Poland
23 June 2016	European Championships, Toruń	Russia	France	Ukraine
25 June 2016	Pan American Championships, Panama City	United States	Mexico	Canada
13 August 2016	Olympic Games, Rio de Janeiro	Russia	Ukraine	United States
