= Fencing at the 2016 Summer Olympics – Qualification =

This article details the qualifying phase for fencing at the 2016 Summer Olympics. Qualification was primarily based on the FIE Official Ranking as of April 4, 2016, with further individual places available at 4 zonal qualifying tournaments.

For the team events, 8 teams qualified in each event. Each team must be composed of 3 fencers. The top 4 ranked teams qualified. The next best ranked team from each zone (Africa, the Americas, Europe, and Asia-Oceania) qualified as long as it was ranked in the top 16. If a zone had no teams ranked between 5th and 16th, the best placed nation not already qualified would be selected regardless of zone.

For individual events with corresponding team events, the 3 fencers from the team event qualified for individual competition automatically. 7 more places were awarded based on the rankings (ignoring fencers from countries with team qualifications and considering only the top fencer from each country): the top 2 fencers from each of Europe, Asia-Oceania, and the Americas, and the top 1 fencer from Africa, qualified. 4 more places (1 per zone) were awarded through zone qualifying tournaments; only countries without a qualified fencer in an event were eligible to participate in these zone qualifying tournaments.

For individual events without corresponding team events, the top 14 fencers in the rankings (adjusted to include only the top 2 fencers per country) qualified. The next 2 best ranked fencers from each zone (but from different countries) also qualified. 10 spots were allocated through zone qualifying tournaments (4 for Europe, 3 for Asia-Oceania, 2 for the Americas, and 1 for Africa); only countries without a qualified fencer in an event were eligible to participate in these zone qualifying tournaments and each country could send only 1 fencer.

The host country was guaranteed a minimum of 8 quota spots.

== Summary ==
Nation	Men					Women					Total
Nation	Individual			Team		Individual			Team		Total
Nation	Épée	Foil	Sabre	Épée	Foil	Épée	Foil	Sabre	Épée	Sabre	Total
Algeria		1					1				2
Argentina								1			1
Austria		1									1
Azerbaijan								1			1
Belarus			1								1
Belgium			1								1
Benin			1								1
Brazil	3	3	1	X	X	3	2	1	X		13
Bulgaria			1								1
Canada	1	1	1			1	1				5
China	1	3	1		X	3	2	1	X		11
Colombia	1						1				2
Cuba			1								1
Czech Republic	1	1									2
Egypt	1	3	1		X		1	1			7
Estonia	1					3			X		4
France	3	3	1	X	X	3	2	3	X	X	15
Georgia			1								1
Germany		1	2				1				4
Great Britain		3			X						3
Greece							1	1			2
Hong Kong		1				1	1				3
Hungary	3		2	X		1	2	1			9
Iran			2								2
Italy	3	3	2	X	X	1	2	3		X	14
Ivory Coast						1					1
Japan	1	1	1			1	1	1			6
Kazakhstan			1								1
Kuwait	1										1
Lebanon							1				1
Mexico		1	1			1	1	3		X	7
Morocco							1				1
Netherlands	1										1
Panama								1			1
Poland							1	3		X	4
Romania			1			3	1		X		5
Russia	3	3	2	X	X	3	2	3	X	X	16
Saudi Arabia							1				1
Senegal	1										1
South Korea	3	1	2	X		3	2	3	X	X	14
Switzerland	3			X		1					4
Turkey							1				1
Tunisia		1	1			1	1	1			5
Ukraine	3		1	X		3	1	3	X	X	11
United States	1	3	2		X	3	2	3	X	X	14
Venezuela	3	1		X			1	1			6
Vietnam			1			1	1	1			4
Total: 48 NOCs	38	35	32	9	8	37	35	36	9	8	213

== Timeline ==
Event	Date	Venue
FIE Official Ranking cut-off	April 4, 2016	—
Zonal Qualifier – Asia & Oceania	April 11–12, 2016	(China) Wuxi
Zonal Qualifier – Africa	April 14–15, 2016	(Algeria) Algiers
Zonal Qualifier – America	April 16–17, 2016	(Costa Rica) San José
Zonal Qualifier – Europe	April 16–17, 2016	(Czech Republic) Prague

== Men's events ==
=== Individual épée ===
Standard	Places	Qualified fencer
Members of qualifying teams	24	Daniel Jérent (FRA); Gauthier Grumier (FRA); Yannick Borel (FRA); Anatoliy Herey (UKR); Dmytro Karyuchenko (UKR); Bohdan Nikishyn (UKR); Marco Fichera (ITA); Enrico Garozzo (ITA); Paolo Pizzo (ITA); Max Heinzer (SUI); Fabian Kauter (SUI); Benjamin Steffen (SUI); Gábor Boczkó (HUN); Géza Imre (HUN); András Rédli (HUN); Park Kyoung-doo (KOR); Park Sang-young (KOR); Jung Jin-sun (KOR); Silvio Fernández (VEN); Francisco Limardo (VEN); Rubén Limardo (VEN); Vadim Anokhin (RUS); Anton Avdeev (RUS); Pavel Sukhov (RUS)
Top 2 individual AOR: Asia & Oceania	2	Kazuyasu Minobe (JPN); Jiao Yunlong (CHN)
Top individual AOR: Africa	1	Alexandre Bouzaid (SEN)
Top 2 individual AOR: America	2	Maxime Brinck-Croteau (CAN); Jason Pryor (USA)
Top 2 individual AOR: Europe	2	Bas Verwijlen (NED); Nikolai Novosjolov (EST)
Zonal tournament: Asia & Oceania	1	Abdulaziz Al-Shatti (KUW)
Zonal tournament: Africa	1	Ayman Fayez (EGY)
Zonal tournament: America	1	Jhon Édison Rodríguez (COL)
Zonal tournament: Europe	1	Jiří Beran (CZE)
Host country option	3	Nicolas Ferreira (BRA); Guilherme Melaragno (BRA); Athos Schwantes (BRA)
Total	38	

=== Team épée ===
Standard	Places	Qualified teams
Top four in FIE Official Team Ranking	5	France; Ukraine; Italy; Switzerland; Hungary
Top team from Asia & Oceania in positions 5–16	1	South Korea
Top team from Africa in positions 5–16	0	—
Top team from America in positions 5–16	1	Venezuela
Top team from Europe in positions 5–16	1	Russia
Host country option	1	Brazil
Total	9	

=== Individual foil ===
Standard	Places	Qualified fencer
Members of qualifying teams	24	Artur Akhmatkhuzin (RUS); Aleksey Cheremisinov (RUS); Timur Safin (RUS); Giorgio Avola (ITA); Andrea Cassarà (ITA); Daniele Garozzo (ITA); Jérémy Cadot (FRA); Erwann Le Pechoux (FRA); Enzo Lefort (FRA); Miles Chamley-Watson (USA); Alexander Massialas (USA); Gerek Meinhardt (USA); Ma Jianfei (CHN); Chen Haiwei (CHN); Lei Sheng (CHN); Mohammed Essam (EGY); Tarek Ayad (EGY); Alaaeldin Abouelkassem (EGY); Henrique Marques (BRA); Ghislain Perrier (BRA); Guilherme Toldo (BRA); Richard Kruse (GBR); Laurence Halsted (GBR); James Davis (GBR)
Top 2 individual AOR: Asia & Oceania	2	Yuki Ota (JPN); Heo Jun (KOR)
Top individual AOR: Africa	1	Mohamed Ayoub Ferjani (TUN)
Top 2 individual AOR: America	2	Maximilien van Haaster (CAN); Daniel Gómez (MEX)
Top 2 individual AOR: Europe	2	Peter Joppich (GER); Alexander Choupenitch (CZE)
Zonal tournament: Asia & Oceania	1	Cheung Ka Long (HKG)
Zonal tournament: Africa	1	Victor Sintès (ALG)
Zonal tournament: America	1	Antonio Leal (VEN)
Zonal tournament: Europe	1	René Pranz (AUT)
Host country option	0	—
Total	35	

=== Team foil ===
Standard	Places	Qualified teams
Top four in FIE Official Team Ranking	4	Russia; Italy; France; United States
Top team from Asia & Oceania in positions 5–16	1	China
Top team from Africa in positions 5–16	1	Egypt
Top team from America in positions 5–16	1	Brazil
Top team from Europe in positions 5–16	1	Great Britain
Host country option	0	—
Total	8	

=== Individual sabre ===
Standard	Places	Qualified fencer
Top 14 individual AOR	14	Aleksey Yakimenko (RUS); Gu Bon-gil (KOR); Áron Szilágyi (HUN); Tiberiu Dolniceanu (ROU); Kim Jung-hwan (KOR); Max Hartung (GER); Aldo Montano (ITA); Eli Dershwitz (USA); Nikolay Kovalev (RUS); Daryl Homer (USA); Mojtaba Abedini (IRI); Diego Occhiuzzi (ITA); Matyas Szabo (GER); Aliaksandr Buikevich (BLR)
Top 2 individual AOR: Asia & Oceania	2	Ali Pakdaman (IRI); Sun Wei (CHN)
Top 2 individual AOR: Africa	2	Mohamed Amer (EGY); Yémi Apithy (BEN)
Top 2 individual AOR: America	2	Renzo Agresta (BRA); Joseph Polossifakis (CAN)
Top 2 individual AOR: Europe	2	Vincent Anstett (FRA); Tamás Decsi (HUN)
Zonal tournament: Asia & Oceania	3	Vũ Thành An (VIE); Ilya Mokretsov (KAZ); Kenta Tokunan (JPN)
Zonal tournament: Africa	1	Farès Ferjani (TUN)
Zonal tournament: America	2	Julián Ayala (MEX); Yoandry Iriarte (CUB)
Zonal tournament: Europe	4	Andriy Yahodka (UKR); Sandro Bazadze (GEO); Pancho Paskov (BUL); Seppe Van Holsbeke (BEL)
Host country option	0	—
Total	32	

== Women's events ==
=== Individual épée ===
Standard	Places	Qualified fencer
Members of qualifying teams	24	Ana Maria Brânză (ROU); Simona Gherman (ROU); Simona Pop (ROU); Xu Anqi (CHN); Sun Yiwen (CHN); Sun Yujie (CHN); Violetta Kolobova (RUS); Tatiana Logunova (RUS); Lyubov Shutova (RUS); Julia Beljajeva (EST); Irina Embrich (EST); Erika Kirpu (EST); Marie-Florence Candassamy (FRA); Auriane Mallo (FRA); Lauren Rembi (FRA); Kang Young-mi (KOR); Choi In-jeong (KOR); Shin A-lam (KOR); Katharine Holmes (USA); Courtney Hurley (USA); Kelley Hurley (USA); Kseniya Pantelyeyeva (UKR); Olena Kryvytska (UKR); Yana Shemyakina (UKR)
Top 2 individual AOR: Asia & Oceania	2	Nozomi Sato (JPN); Vivian Kong (HKG)
Top individual AOR: Africa	1	Sarra Besbes (TUN)
Top 2 individual AOR: America	2	Nathalie Moellhausen (BRA); Leonora MacKinnon (CAN)
Top 2 individual AOR: Europe	2	Rossella Fiamingo (ITA); Emese Szász (HUN)
Zonal tournament: Asia & Oceania	1	Nguyễn Thị Như Hoa (VIE)
Zonal tournament: Africa	1	~~Juliana Barrett (RSA)~~; Gbahi-Gwladys Sakoa (CIV)
Zonal tournament: America	1	Alejandra Terán (MEX)
Zonal tournament: Europe	1	Tiffany Géroudet (SUI)
Host country option	2	Rayssa Costa (BRA); Amanda Simeão (BRA)
Total	37	

=== Team épée ===
Standard	Places	Qualified teams
Top four in FIE Official Team Ranking	5	Romania; China; Russia; Estonia; France
Top team from Asia & Oceania in positions 5–16	1	South Korea
Top team from Africa in positions 5–16	0	—
Top team from America in positions 5–16	1	United States
Top team from Europe in positions 5–16	1	Ukraine
Host country option	1	Brazil
Total	9	

=== Individual foil ===
Standard	Places	Qualified fencer
Top 14 individual AOR	14	Arianna Errigo (ITA); Inna Deriglazova (RUS); Elisa Di Francisca (ITA); Lee Kiefer (USA); Aida Shanaeva (RUS); Ysaora Thibus (FRA); Inès Boubakri (TUN); Nzingha Prescod (USA); Jeon Hee-sook (KOR); Nam Hyun-hee (KOR); Astrid Guyart (FRA); Aida Mohamed (HUN); Le Huilin (CHN); Carolin Golubytskyi (GER)
Top 2 individual AOR: Asia & Oceania	2	Liu Yongshi (CHN); Mona Shaito (LIB)
Top 2 individual AOR: Africa	2	Noura Mohamed (EGY); Anissa Khelfaoui (ALG)
Top 2 individual AOR: America	2	Eleanor Harvey (CAN); Saskia Loretta van Erven Garcia (COL)
Top 2 individual AOR: Europe	2	Edina Knapek (HUN); Hanna Łyczbińska (POL)
Zonal tournament: Asia & Oceania	3	~~Yuan Ping (NZL)~~; Shiho Nishioka (JPN); Lin Po Heung (HKG); Đỗ Thị Anh (VIE)
Zonal tournament: Africa	1	Youssra Zekrani (MAR)
Zonal tournament: America	2	Isis Giménez (VEN); Nataly Michel (MEX)
Zonal tournament: Europe	3	~~Delila Hatuel (ISR)~~; Aikaterini Kontochristopoulou (GRE); İrem Karamete (TUR); Mălina Călugăreanu (ROU); Olha Leleiko (UKR)
Host country option	2	Bia Bulcão (BRA); Taís Rochel (BRA)
Exceptional additional quota place	1	Lubna Al-Omair (KSA)
Total	35	

=== Individual sabre ===
Standard	Places	Qualified fencer
Members of qualifying teams	24	Yana Egorian (RUS); Sofiya Velikaya (RUS); Ekaterina Dyachenko (RUS); Olena Kravatska (UKR); Alina Komashchuk (UKR); Olga Kharlan (UKR); Cécilia Berder (FRA); Manon Brunet (FRA); Charlotte Lembach (FRA); Ibtihaj Muhammad (USA); Dagmara Wozniak (USA); Mariel Zagunis (USA); Aleksandra Socha (POL); Bogna Jóźwiak (POL); Malgorzata Kozaczuk (POL); Kim Ji-yeon (KOR); Seo Ji-yeon (KOR); Hwang Seon-a (KOR); Tania Arrayales (MEX); Úrsula González (MEX); Julieta Toledo (MEX); Rossella Gregorio (ITA); Irene Vecchi (ITA); Loreta Gulotta (ITA)
Top 2 individual AOR: Asia & Oceania	2	Shen Chen (CHN); Chika Aoki (JPN)
Top individual AOR: Africa	1	Azza Besbes (TUN)
Top 2 individual AOR: America	2	Alejandra Benítez (VEN); María Belén Pérez Maurice (ARG)
Top 2 individual AOR: Europe	2	Anna Márton (HUN); Vassiliki Vougiouka (GRE)
Zonal tournament: Asia & Oceania	1	Nguyễn Thị Lệ Dung (VIE)
Zonal tournament: Africa	1	Nada Hafez (EGY)
Zonal tournament: America	1	~~Rossy Félix (DOM)~~; Eileen Grench (PAN)
Zonal tournament: Europe	1	Sabina Mikina (AZE)
Host country option	1	Marta Baeza (BRA)
Total	36	

=== Team sabre ===
Standard	Places	Qualified teams
Top four in FIE Official Team Ranking	5	Russia; Ukraine; France; United States; Poland
Top team from Asia & Oceania in positions 5–16	1	South Korea
Top team from Africa in positions 5–16	0	—
Top team from America in positions 5–16	1	Mexico
Top team from Europe in positions 5–16	1	Italy
Host country option	0	—
Total	8	
