= Besbes (surname) =

Besbes is a surname. Notable people with the surname include:

- Azza Besbes (born 1990), Tunisian sabre fencer, sister of Sarra
- Sarra Besbes (born 1989), Tunisian épée fencer
