= 2016 African Fencing Championships =

The 2016 African Fencing Championships were held in Algiers, Algeria in April.

== Medal summary ==
=== Men's events ===
| Event | Gold | Silver | Bronze |
|---|---|---|---|
| Foil | Alaaeldin Abouelkassem (EGY) | Victor Sintès (ALG) | Tarek Ayad (EGY); Mohamed Samandi (TUN) |
| Épée | Alexandre Bouzaid (SEN) | Ayman Fayez (EGY) | Ahmed Elsaghir (EGY); Mahmoud Mohsen (EGY) |
| Sabre | Mohab Samer (EGY) | Fares Ferjani (TUN) | Mostafa Ayman (EGY); Hichem Samandi (TUN) |
| Team Foil | Egypt; Alaaeldin Abouelkassem; Tarek Ayad; Mohamed Essam; Mohamed Hamza | Tunisia; Heythem Bessaoud; Ayoub Ferjani; Mohamed Samandi | Algeria; Yanis Baptiste Mabed; Salim Heroui; Youcef Madi; Victor Sintes |
| Team Épée | Egypt; Ahmed El Saghir; Ayman Fayez; Mahmoud Mohsen; Mohannad Saif | Senegal; Alexandre Bouzaid; Babacar Kadam; Bourama Kéba Sagnan | Algeria; Menouar Benreguia; Mohamed Benyahia; Maxime Ichem Cade; Leo Hamcha |
| Team Sabre | Tunisia; Ahmed Ferjani; Fares Ferjani; Hichem Samandi | Egypt; Ahmed Amr; Mostafa Ayman; Ziad Elsissy; Mohab Samer | Algeria; Akram Bounabi; Zin Eddine Heroui; Acyl Maaziz; Anis Mairi |

=== Women's events ===
| Event | Gold | Silver | Bronze |
|---|---|---|---|
| Foil | Inès Boubakri (TUN) | Anissa Khelfaoui (ALG) | Haifa Jabri (TUN); Youssra Zakarani (MAR) |
| Épée | Sarra Besbes (TUN) | Gbahi Gwladys Sakoa (CIV) | Nedjma Djouad (ALG); Maya Mansouri (TUN) |
| Sabre | Azza Besbes (TUN) | Mennatalla Ahmed (EGY) | Sarah Atrouz (ALG); Abik Boungab (ALG) |
| Team Foil | Tunisia; Inès Boubakri; Haifa Jabri | Algeria; Narimene Elhaouari; Anissa Khelfaoui; Wassila Redouane; Khadidja Zerabib | |
| Team Épée | Egypt; Nardin Ehab; Salwa Gaber; Shirwit Gaber; Ayah Mahdy | Tunisia; Sarra Besbes; Maya Mansouri; Nesrine Ghrib; Dorra Ben Jaballah | Algeria; Nedjma Djouad; Yousra Zeboudj; Hanane Laggoune; Yousra Rouibet |
| Team Sabre | Tunisia; Azza Besbes; Khadija Chemkhi; Yasmine Daghfous | Algeria; Sonia Abdiche; Sarah Atrouz; Abik Boungab; Amira El Hafaia | Egypt; Mennatalla Ahmed; Maryam El Sawy; Nada Hafez; Nour Montaser |

== Medal table ==
Host

| Rank | Nation | Gold | Silver | Bronze | Total |
|---|---|---|---|---|---|
| 1 | Tunisia | 6 | 3 | 4 | 13 |
| 2 | Egypt* | 5 | 3 | 5 | 13 |
| 3 | Senegal | 1 | 1 | 0 | 2 |
| 4 | Algeria | 0 | 4 | 7 | 11 |
| 5 | Ivory Coast | 0 | 1 | 0 | 1 |
| 6 | Morocco | 0 | 0 | 1 | 1 |
| Totals (6 entries) | | 12 | 12 | 17 | 41 |
