= 2015 African Fencing Championships =

The 2015 African Fencing Championships were held in Cairo, Egypt from 12 to 16 June.

== Medal summary ==
=== Men's events ===
| Event | Gold | Silver | Bronze |
|---|---|---|---|
| Foil | Ayoub Ferjani (TUN) | Roman Djitli (ALG) | Tarek Ayad (EGY); Mohamed Samandi (TUN) |
| Épée | Alexandre Bouzaid (SEN) | Ahmed El Saghir (EGY) | Ayman Fayez (EGY); Mohannad Saif (EGY) |
| Sabre | Mohamed Amer (EGY) | Yémi Apithy (BEN) | Fares Ferjani (TUN); Hichem Samandi (TUN) |
| Team Foil | Egypt; Alaaeldin Abouelkassem; Marwan Ahmed; Tarek Ayad; Mohamed Essam | Tunisia; Heythem Bessaoud; Ayoub Ferjani; Mohamed Samandi | Algeria; Roman Djitli; Salim Heroui; Yanis Baptiste Mabed; Youcef Madi |
| Team Épée | Egypt; Ahmed El Saghir; Ayman Fayez; Ahmed Nabil; Mohannad Saif | Morocco; Abdelkarim El Haouari; Aissam Rami; Zacharie Hervé Roger | Senegal; Alexandre Bouzaid; Cheikh Omar Diallo; Babacar Kadam; Bourama Keba Sagnan |
| Team Sabre | Egypt; Aly Adel; Mohamed Amer; Ahmed Amr; Ziad Elsissy | Tunisia; Amine Akkari; Iheb Ben Chaabeene; Fares Ferjani; Hichem Samandi | Senegal; Moustapha Diagne; Ibrahima Konte; Ahmet Mbodj; Abdoulaye Thiam |

=== Women's events ===
| Event | Gold | Silver | Bronze |
|---|---|---|---|
| Foil | Inès Boubakri (TUN) | Noura Mohamed (EGY) | Yara El Sharkawy (EGY); Anissa Khelfaoui (ALG) |
| Épée | Sarra Besbes (TUN) | Inès Boubakri (TUN) | Nardin Ehab (EGY); Tamryn Carfoot (RSA) |
| Sabre | Azza Besbes (TUN) | Amira Ben Chaabane (TUN) | Mariam El Sway (EGY); Héla Besbes (TUN) |
| Team Foil | Tunisia; Dorra Ben Jallabah; Sarra Besbes; Inès Boubakri; Maya Mansouri | Algeria; Ferial Adjabi; Narimane El Houari; Anissa Khelfaoui; Louiza Khalfaoui | Egypt; Yara El Sharkawy; Noura Mohamed; Noha Wasfy; Aida Yasser |
| Team Épée | Tunisia; Dorra Ben Jallabah; Sarra Besbes; Inès Boubakri; Maya Mansouri | South Africa; Juliana Barrett; Tamryn Carfoot; Giselle Vicatos | Egypt; Nardin Ehab; Salwa Gaber; Shirwit Gaber; Ayah Mahdy |
| Team Sabre | Tunisia; Amira Ben Chaabane; Azza Besbes; Hela Besbes; Yosra Ghrairi | Egypt; Mennatalla Ahmed; Mariam El Sway; Nada Hafez; Nour Montaser | Algeria; Sonia Abdiche; Abik Boungab; Nedjma Djouad; Amira Hayet Sabah El Hafaia |

== Medal table ==
Host

| Rank | Nation | Gold | Silver | Bronze | Total |
|---|---|---|---|---|---|
| 1 | Tunisia | 7 | 4 | 4 | 15 |
| 2 | Egypt* | 4 | 3 | 8 | 15 |
| 3 | Senegal | 1 | 0 | 2 | 3 |
| 4 | Algeria | 0 | 2 | 3 | 5 |
| 5 | South Africa | 0 | 1 | 1 | 2 |
| 6 | Benin | 0 | 1 | 0 | 1 |
| 6 | Morocco | 0 | 1 | 0 | 1 |
| Totals (7 entries) | | 12 | 12 | 18 | 42 |
