= Eman Gaber =

Egyptian fencer (born 1989)

Iman Muhammad Shaban Muhammad Gaber (born 11 January 1989), commonly known as Eman Gaber or Iman Shaban, is an Egyptian fencer. At the 2012 Summer Olympics she competed in the Women's foil, received a bye in the first round and was defeated 2–15 in the second round.

She won silver at the 2011, 2012, 2013 and 2014 African Fencing Championships, and bronze in the 2008 and 2009 editions.
