= 2011 African Fencing Championships =

The 2011 African Fencing Championships were the eleventh edition of a top-level fencing competition organized by the African Fencing Confederation.

The events were held in Cairo, Egypt from 21 to 25 July. There were 122 fencers from sixteen countries who competed.

== Medal summary ==
=== Men's events ===
Event	Gold	Silver	Bronze
Foil	Alaaeldin Abouelkassem (EGY)	Mohamed Smandi (TUN)	Tarek Fouad (EGY); Karim Kamoun (TUN)
Épée	Alexandre Bouzaid (SEN)	Ayman Mohamed Fayez (EGY)	Ahmed Elsaghir (EGY); Mohamed Ayoub Ferjani (TUN)
Sabre	Samir Mahmoud (EGY)	Hichem Smandi (TUN)	Tamim Ghazy (EGY); Mannad Ghazy (EGY)
Team Foil	Egypt	Tunisia	South Africa
Team Épée	Egypt	Tunisia	South Africa
Team Sabre	Egypt	Tunisia	Senegal

=== Women's events ===
Two nations only, Egypt and Algeria, entered a team in women's foil.

Event	Gold	Silver	Bronze
Foil	Inès Boubakri (TUN)	Iman Shaban (EGY)	Anissa Khelfaoui (ALG); Shaimaa El-Gammal (EGY)
Épée	Sarra Besbes (TUN)	Mona Abdel Aziz (EGY)	Maya Mansouri (TUN)} Inès Boubakri (TUN)
Sabre	Azza Besbes (TUN)	Amira Ben Chaabane (TUN)	Selma Zien (EGY); Héla Besbes (TUN)
Team Foil	Egypt	Tunisia	Algeria
Team Épée	Tunisia	South Africa	Egypt
Team Sabre	Tunisia	Egypt	South Africa

== Medal table ==
Host

* Host nation (Egypt)

Rank	Nation	Gold	Silver	Bronze	Total
1	Egypt*	6	4	7	17
2	Tunisia	5	7	5	17
3	Senegal	1	0	1	2
4	South Africa	0	1	3	4
5	Algeria	0	0	2	2
Totals (5 entries)		12	12	18	42
