= 2012 African Fencing Championships =

The 2012 African Fencing Championships were held in Casablanca, Morocco from 20 to 25 April.

== Medal summary ==
=== Men's events ===
Event	Gold	Silver	Bronze
Foil	Alaaeldin Abouelkassem (EGY)	Tarek Fouad (EGY)	Lahoussine Ali (MAR); Sherif Farrag (EGY)
Épée	Ayman Mohamed Fayez (EGY)	Ahmed Elsaghir (EGY)	Ahmed Nabil (EGY); Alexandre Bouzaid (SEN)
Sabre	Mannad Ghazy (EGY)	Mamadou Keita (SEN)	Souhaieb Sakrani (TUN); Iheb Ben Chaabene (TUN)
Team Foil	Egypt	Tunisia	Senegal
Team Épée	Egypt	Senegal	Morocco
Team Sabre	Tunisia	Egypt	Senegal

=== Women's events ===
Two nations only, Egypt and Algeria, entered a team in women's foil.

Event	Gold	Silver	Bronze
Foil	Inès Boubakri (TUN)	Iman Shaban (EGY)	Eman El Gammal (EGY); Shaimaa El-Gammal (EGY)
Épée	Sarra Besbes (TUN)	Ayah Mahdy (EGY)	Juliana Barrett (RSA)} Inès Boubakri (TUN)
Sabre	Azza Besbes (TUN)	Amira Ben Chaabane (TUN)	Mennatalla Ahmed (EGY); Héla Besbes (TUN)
Team Foil	Tunisia	Egypt	Algeria
Team Épée	Tunisia	South Africa	Egypt
Team Sabre	Tunisia	Egypt	Senegal

=== Medal table ===
Rank	Nation	Gold	Silver	Bronze	Total
1	Egypt	6	6	6	18
2	Tunisia	6	2	4	12
3	Senegal	0	2	1	3
4	South Africa	0	1	4	5
5	Morocco	0	0	2	2
6	Algeria	0	0	1	1
Totals (6 entries)		12	11	18	41
