= 2010 African Fencing Championships =

The 2010 African Fencing Championships were held in Tunis, Tunisia from 25 to 30 September.

== Medal summary ==
=== Men's events ===
Event	Gold	Silver	Bronze
Foil	Tarek Fouad (EGY)	Mohamed Samandi (TUN)	Mostafa Mahmoud (EGY); Alaaeldin Abouelkassem (EGY)
Épée	Alexendre Bouzaid (SEN)	Nabil Ahmed (EGY)	Jawhar Miled (TUN); Cheikh Omar Diallo (SEN)
Sabre	Souhaieb Sakrani (TUN)	Hichem Smandi (TUN)	Ihen Ben Chaabene (TUN); Mamoudou Keita (SEN)
Team Foil	Egypt	South Africa	Tunisia
Team Épée	Egypt	Tunisia	South Africa
Team Sabre	Tunisia	Senegal	Morocco

=== Women's events ===
Event	Gold	Silver	Bronze
Foil	Inès Boubakri (TUN)	Shaimaa El-Gammal (EGY)	Haifa Jabri (TUN); Eman El-Gammal (EGY)
Épée	Sarra Besbes (TUN)	Mona Abdel Aziz (EGY)	Eman Hossam (EGY); Meriem Hayouni (TUN)
Sabre	Amira Ben Chaabane (TUN)	Azza Besbes (TUN)	Mennatalla Ahmed (EGY); Hela Besbes (TUN)
Team Foil	Egypt	Tunisia	Senegal
Team Épée	Tunisia	South Africa	Egypt
Team Sabre	Tunisia	Egypt	Togo

== Medal table ==
* Host nation (Tunisia)

Rank	Nation	Gold	Silver	Bronze	Total
1	Tunisia*	7	5	6	18
2	Egypt	4	4	6	14
3	Senegal	1	1	3	5
4	South Africa	0	2	1	3
5	Morocco	0	0	1	1
5	Togo	0	0	1	1
Totals (6 entries)		12	12	18	42
