= Mohamed Samandi =

Tunisian fencer

Mohamed Rayan Samandi
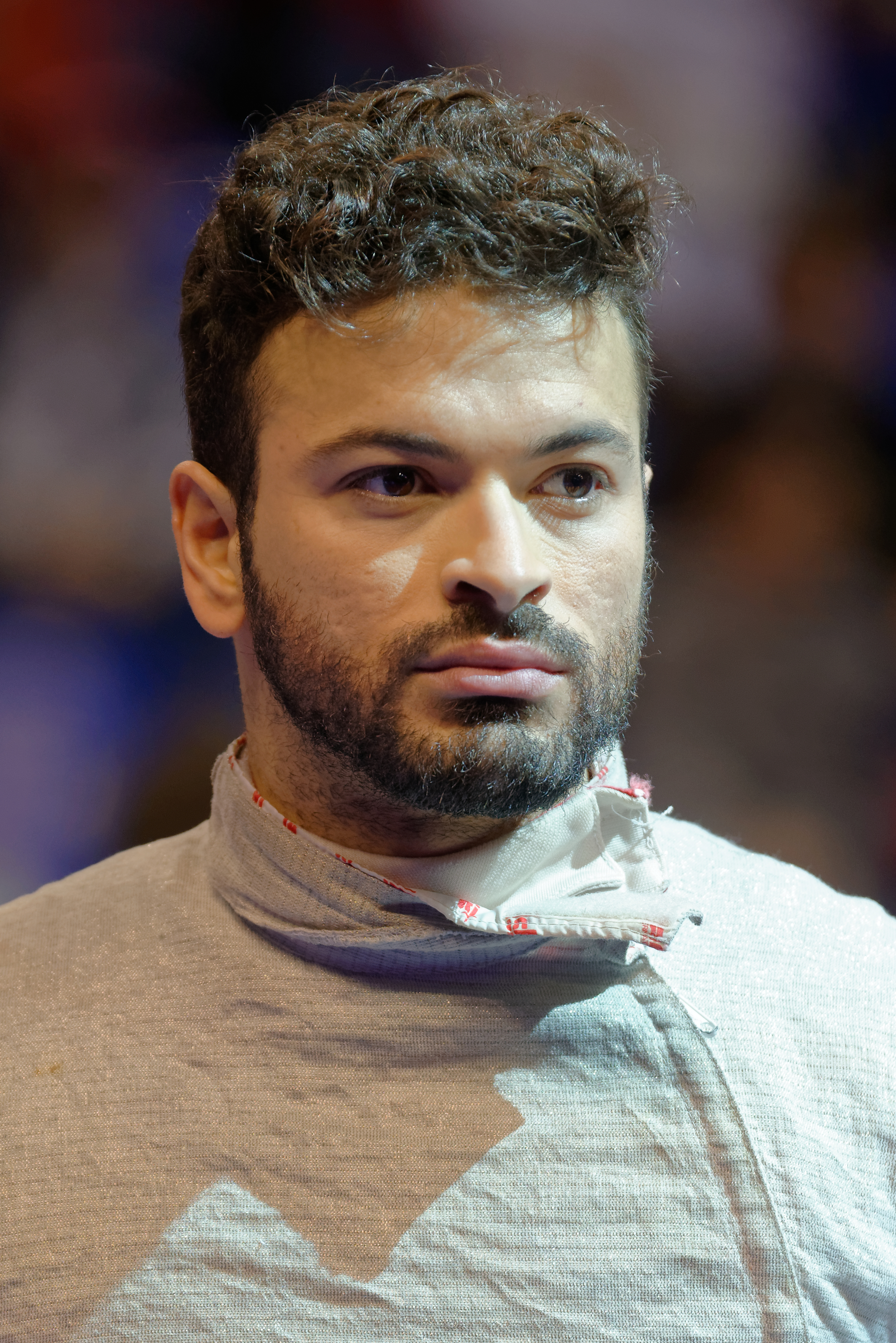
- Samandi in 2016

Personal information
- Nickname: Rayan
- Born: 13 August 1986 (age 40) Tunis, Tunisia
- Home town: London, Great Britain
- Height: 1.84 m (6 ft 0 in)
- Weight: 79 kg (174 lb)

Fencing career
- Sport: Fencing
- Weapon: foil
- Hand: right-handed
- FIE ranking: current ranking
Medal record
Men's foil
Representing Tunisia
African Championships
Gold medal – first place	2014 Cairo	Individual
Silver medal – second place	2010 Tunis	Individual
Silver medal – second place	2011 Cairo	Individual
Bronze medal – third place	2013 Cape Town	Individual
Bronze medal – third place	2015 Cairo	Individual
Bronze medal – third place	2016 Algiers	Individual

Mohamed Rayan Samandi is a Tunisian foil fencer, African champion in 2014. At the 2012 Summer Olympics, he competed in the individual event but was defeated in the second round.

== Career ==
Samandi took up fencing at the age of ten. In 2005 he was the first African to win a stage of the Junior World Cup in Viana do Castelo in Portugal. He claimed the gold medal at the 2007 All-Africa Games.

Samandi qualified for the 2008 Summer Olympics in Beijing through his results at the African qualifying fencing tournament held in Casablanca, but could not attend the competition due to lack of funds. He qualified to the 2012 Summer Olympics as the best-ranked African fencer. In the first round, he defeated 15–8 Great Britain's Husayn Rosowsky, but he fell 7–15 in the next round to World No.1 Andrea Cassarà.

He qualified to represent Tunisia at the 2020 Summer Olympics.
