= Christoph Kneip =

German fencer

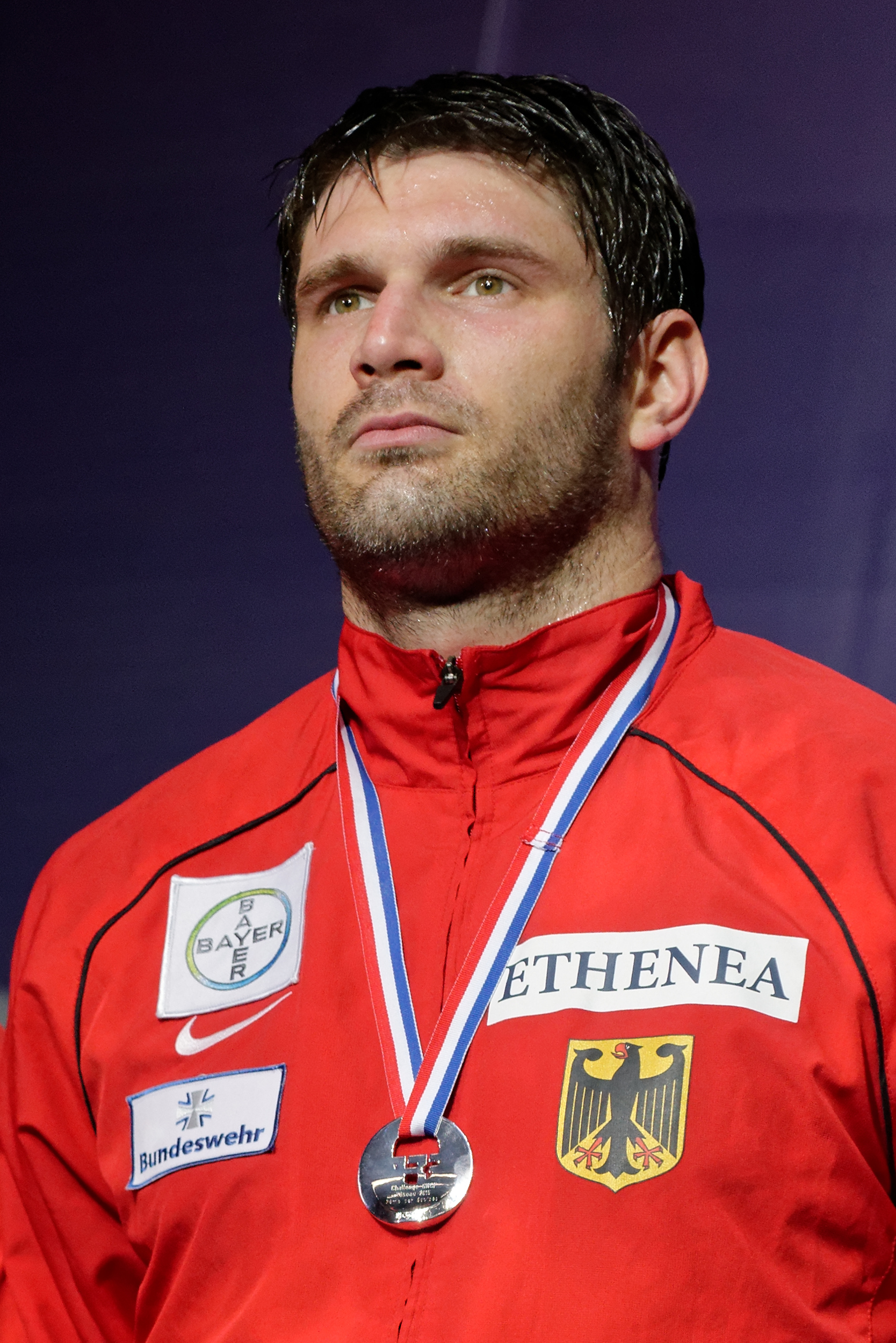

Personal information
- Born: 7 January 1980 (age 46)

Fencing career
- Sport: Fencing
- Weapon: épée
- Hand: right-handed
- National coach: Didier Ollagnon
- Club: TSV Bayer Leverkusen
- FIE ranking: current ranking
Medal record
Men's épée
Representing Germany
World Championships
Silver medal – second place	2003 Havana	Team épée
European Championships
Bronze medal – third place	2010 Leipzig	Team épée

Christoph Kneip (born 7 January 1980) is a German épée fencer, team silver medallist in the 2003 World Championships, and team bronze medallist in the 2010 European Championships.
