= Alexandre Bouzaid =

French-Senegalese fencer

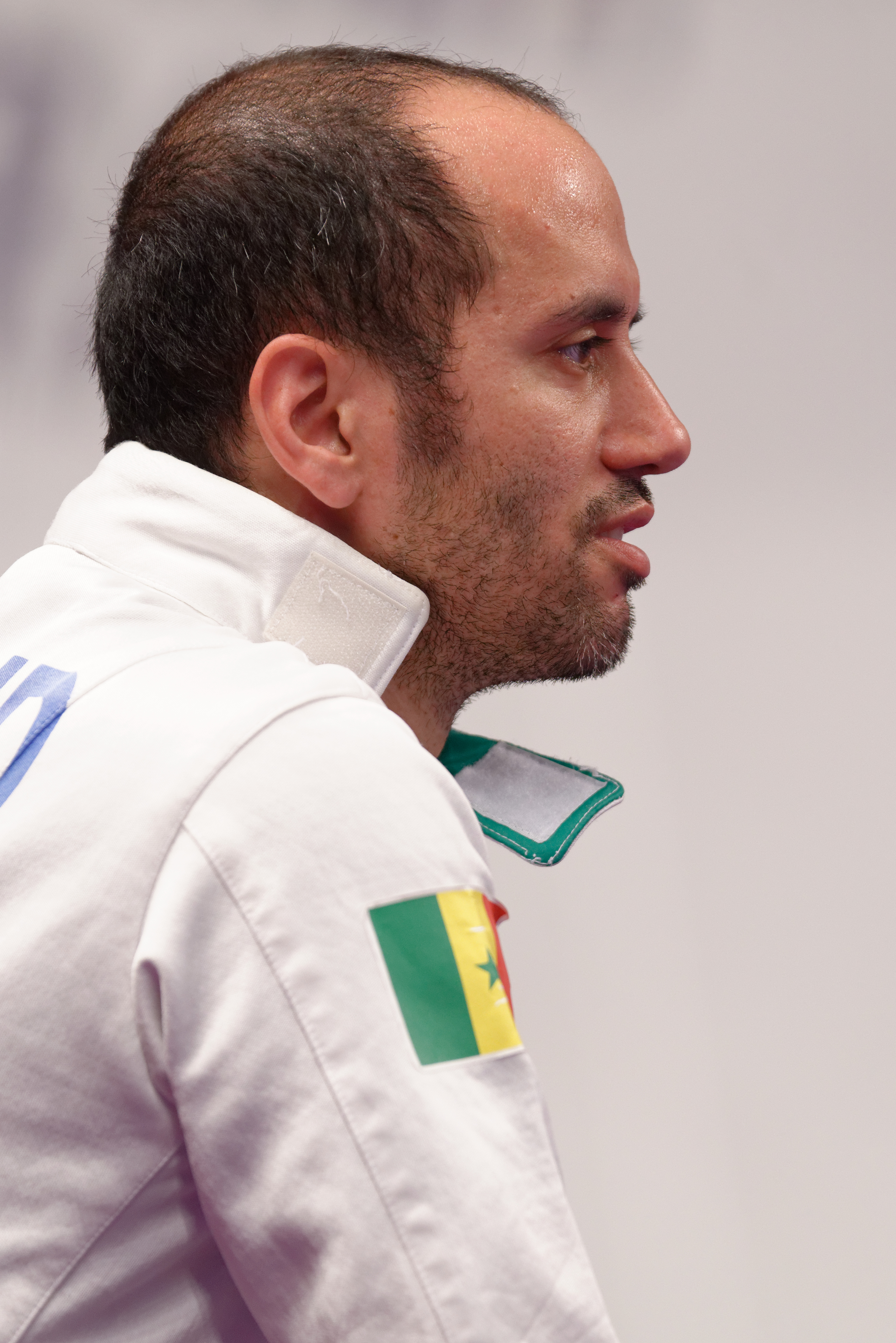

Personal information
- Born: 29 June 1981 (age 45) Libourne, France
- Height: 1.72 m (5 ft 8 in)
- Weight: 64 kg (141 lb)

Fencing career
- Sport: Fencing
- Country: Senegal
- Weapon: épée
- Hand: left-handed
- Club: CE Saint-Gratien
- Head coach: Benoît Janvier
- FIE ranking: current ranking
Medal record
Men's fencing
Representing Senegal
African Championships
Gold medal – first place	2010 Tunis	Individual épée
Gold medal – first place	2011 Cairo	Individual épée
Gold medal – first place	2015 Cairo	Individual épée
Gold medal – first place	2016 Algiers	Individual épée
Bronze medal – third place	2012 Casablanca	Individual épée

Alexandre Bouzaid (born 29 June 1981) is a French-Senegalese épée fencer representing Senegal in international competitions. Twice African champion (2010 and 2011), he took part in the 2012 Summer Olympics.

== Career ==
Bouzaid was born in Kaolack, Senegal, but raised in Libourne, near Bordeaux, in France. He is of Lebanese descent. He began fencing at the age of four at his local club. He became won the French national championship for his age class in 1996. Two years later he earned a gold medal at the Cadet World Championships in Valencia, Venezuela. He reached the final five times out of six participations at the 1999 Junior World Cup.

After his baccalauréat Bouzaid transferred to the Saint-Gratien fencing club in the Paris area and undertook physical education studies at INSEP, a state-sponsored institute for high-performance athletes. He later turned to business studies at ESG Management School, then at ESSEC Business School. He won a team silver medal at the 2007 Summer Universiade and an individual silver medal at the senior French championships.

After he failed to qualify to the 2008 Summer Olympics Bouzaid, who holds dual citizenship, decided to fence for Senegal. He won the 2010 African Championships after defeating Egypt's Ahmed Nabil and posted a last-16 finish at the 2010 World Championships and 2011. His second straight gold medal at the 2011 African Championships against Egypt's Ayman Mohamed Fayez qualified him to the 2012 Summer Olympics as the top-ranked African fencer. In London he defeated 15–9 Poland's Radosław Zawrotniak in the first round, but lost 11–15 to reigning World champion Paolo Pizzo of Italy.
