= Azza Besbes =

Tunisian sabre fencer

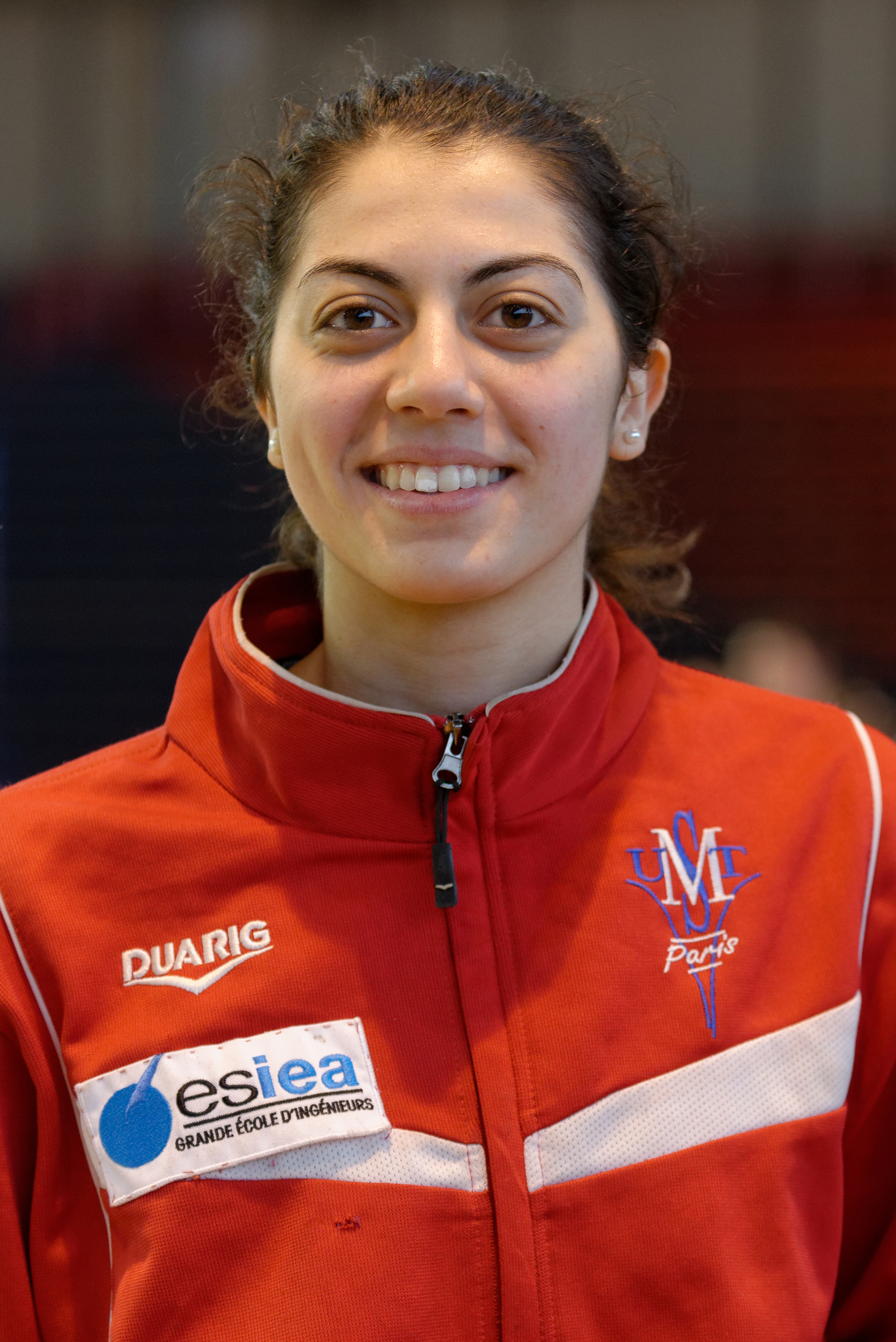

Personal information
- Nickname: Zaza
- Nationality: Tunisia
- Born: 28 November 1990 (age 35) United Arab Emirates
- Height: 1.74 m (5 ft 9 in)
- Weight: 70 kg (154 lb)

Fencing career
- Sport: Fencing
- Country: Tunisia
- Weapon: sabre
- Hand: right-handed
- National coach: Mohamed Rebai
- Head coach: Mohamed Rebai
- FIE ranking: current ranking
Medal record
World Championships
Silver medal – second place	2017 Leipzig	Individual
Mediterranean Games
Gold medal – first place	2018 Tarragona	Individual
Bronze medal – third place	2013 Mersin	Individual
African Championships
Gold medal – first place	2009 Dakar	Individual
Gold medal – first place	2011 Cairo	Individual
Gold medal – first place	2012 Casablanca	Individual
Gold medal – first place	2013 Cape Town	Individual
Gold medal – first place	2014 Cairo	Individual
Gold medal – first place	2015 Cairo	Individual
Gold medal – first place	2016 Algiers	Individual
Silver medal – second place	2010 Tunis	Individual

Azza Besbes (Arabic: عزة بسباس; born 28 November 1990) is a Tunisian sabre fencer, five-time African champion. She took part in the 2008, 2012 and 2016 Summer Olympics, finishing 7th, 9th and 5th respectively.

== Personal life ==
Besbes was born in a sports family: her father Ali is a former basketball player, who became a physical education teacher; her mother Hayet Ben Ghazi is a former foil fencer, who became an international referee. Her parents settled in Abu Dhabi before she was born. They had all their children–daughters Azza, Sarra, Héla and Rym, son Ahmed Aziz–take up fencing. Sarra competed in the women's épée at the 2012 Summer Olympics in London.

== Career ==
Besbes took up fencing when she was six. She was first given a foil, but she found the weapon too quiet and switched to sabre under the coaching of Yan Nowara. When she was ten she joined the Tunis Air Club, where she trained until 2005, when the fencing section was closed for lack of funds. She went on training with the Tunisian national team for two years, then she moved to France.

She joined first the Cercle d'Escrime in Orleans, then US Metro in Paris, both clubs specialized in sabre, under a scholarship from the Tunisian Ministry of Youth and Sports. She was invited to share training sessions with the French national team. The same year Besbes posted a top-8 finish at the Junior World Fencing Championships in Belek and she took a silver medal at the 2007 All-Africa Games in Algiers. Besbes qualified to the individual event of the 2008 Summer Olympics in Beijing as the top-ranked fencer of the African zone. She defeated South Africa's Jyoti Chetty, then France's Léonore Perrus, before meeting Canada's Olga Ovtchinnikova in the table of 16. The bout was marred by technical glitches: after Ovtchinnikova took a 9–5 lead, she struck a hit which did not register on the electrical apparatus and was finally denied. The incident occurred twice. After the problem was resolved, Besbes struck ten hits in a row to win the bout.

At the age of 18 she became the first female African athlete to fence in an Olympic quarter-final. She took a 9–6 lead against US fencer and World No.1 Rebecca Ward, but Ward levelled, before taking the advantage on 14–12. Besbes rallied to 14-all at the end of fencing time. The last hit required a lengthy video review and was finally given to Ward, who won the bout.

In the 2008–09 season Besbes posted a top-8 finish at the Ghent World Cup and earned the gold medal at the African Championships in Dakar. The next year, she took a silver at the Africans in Tunis and reached the quarter-finals at the 2010 World Championships in Paris, before being stopped by Ukraine's Olena Khomrova. In the 2010–11 season she climbed her first World Cup with a bronze medal at the Bologna World Cup. She regained her African crown in Cairo and posted a last-16 finish at the World Championships in Catania. These results allowed her to close the season World No.8, a career best as of 2015.Besbes qualified to the 2012 Summer Olympics as the top-ranked African fencer, this time with another Tunisian, Amira Ben Chaabane . Besbes defeated Hong Kong's Au Sin Ying in the first round, before losing out her next match to American fencer Dagmara Wozniak, with a score of 13–15.

Besbes again qualified to the individual event of the 2016 Summer Olympics, and reached the quarterfinal. She was ultimately ranked 5th after losing 15–14 against the French fencer Manon Brunet.

In 2017, she finished 2nd at the world championships in Leipzig in 2017, thus becoming the first Tunisian to become vice-world champion and the only one to have won a medal at the world championships in all three age categories. In 2018, Azza wins the gold medal at the Mediterranean Games in Tarragona, Spain.

In 2021, she founded Azza Fencing, a fencing footwear brand.
