= Mohab Samer =

Egyptian fencer

Personal information
- Nationality: Egypt
- Born: 6 June 1995 (age 31)

Sport
- Sport: Fencing

Mohab Samer (born 6 June 1995) is an Egyptian sabre fencer. He competed in the 2020 Summer Olympics. Samer has worked as a site engineer at Rowad Modern Engineering in Egypt
