= Amira Ben Chaabane =

Tunisian fencer (born 1990)

Personal information
- Nationality: tunisian
- Born: 29 May 1990 (age 36) Tunis, Tunisia
- Height: 1.75 m (5 ft 9 in)
- Weight: 61 kg (134 lb)

Fencing career
- Sport: Fencing
- Weapon: sabre
- Hand: right-handed
- National coach: Emil Oancea
- Club: ASFT
- FIE ranking: current ranking
Medal record
Women's sabre
Representing Tunisia
African Championships
Gold medal – first place	2010 Tunis	Individual
Gold medal – first place	2019 Bamako	Individual
Silver medal – second place	2011 Cairo	Individual
Silver medal – second place	2012 Casablanca	Individual
Silver medal – second place	2014 Cairo	Individual
Silver medal – second place	2015 Cairo	Individual
Bronze medal – third place	2009 Dakar	Individual

Amira Ben Chaabane (Arabic: أميرة بن شعبان; born 29 May 1990) is a Tunisian sabre fencer; gold medallist at the 2010 African Fencing Championships. She qualified to the individual event of the 2012 Summer Olympics as one of the best top-ranked fencers of the African zone. She was defeated 15–12 in the first round by Chen Xiaodong of China. In 2019, she won the African Fencing Championships again.

She competed at the 2020 Summer Olympics.
