= Muhannad Saif El-Din =

Egyptian fencer

Personal information
- Born: 11 September 1980 (age 45)

Sport
- Sport: Fencing

Muhannad Saif El-Din (born 11 September 1980) is an Egyptian fencer. He competed in the épée events at the 2000 and 2004 Summer Olympics.
