= Sarra Besbes =

Tunisian fencer (born 1989)

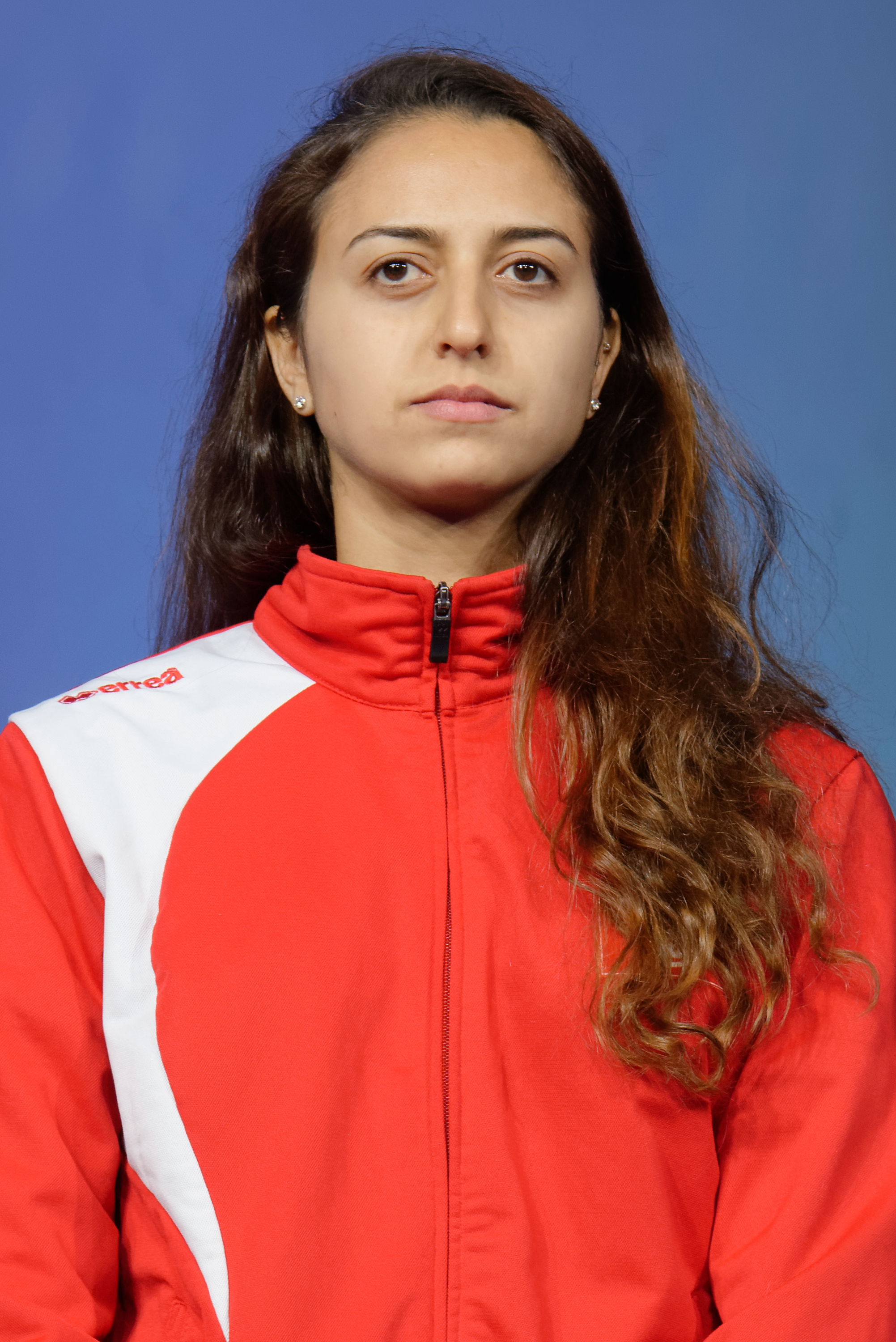
- Besbes at the 2015 World Fencing Championships

Personal information
- Born: 5 February 1989 (age 37) Abu Dhabi, United Arab Emirates
- Height: 1.75 m (5 ft 9 in)
- Weight: 62 kg (137 lb; 9.8 st)

Fencing career
- Sport: Fencing
- Country: Tunisia
- Weapon: épée
- Hand: left-handed
- Club: VGA Saint-Maur
- Head coach: Daniel Levavasseur
- FIE ranking: current ranking
Medal record
World Championships
Bronze medal – third place	2015 Moscow	Individual
African Championships
Gold medal – first place	2009 Dakar	Individual
Gold medal – first place	2010 Tunis	Individual
Gold medal – first place	2011 Cairo	Individual
Gold medal – first place	2012 Casablanca	Individual
Gold medal – first place	2013 Cape Town	Individual
Gold medal – first place	2014 Cairo	Individual
Gold medal – first place	2015 Cairo	Individual
Gold medal – first place	2016 Algiers	Individual
Bronze medal – third place	2007 Algiers	Individual
Bronze medal – third place	2008 Casablanca	Individual
African Games
Gold medal – first place	2019 Salé	Individual Épée
Mediterranean Games
Silver medal – second place	2009 Pescara	Individual
Silver medal – second place	2013 Mersin	Individual

Sarra Besbes (Arabic: سارة بسباس; born 5 February 1989) is a Tunisian épée fencer, seven-time gold medallist at the African Fencing Championships. She represented Tunisia at the 2012 Summer Olympics in London, placing eighth, and at the 2016 Summer Olympics in Rio de Janeiro, placing fifth.

== Personal life ==
Besbes was born into a sports family: her father, Ali is a former basketball player who became a physical education teacher; her mother, Hayet Ben Ghazi, is a former foil fencer who became an international referee.

== Career ==
At the 2011 World Championships in Catania, Besbes noticed she would fight an Israeli athlete during the qualifications phase. She asked the Tunisian Fencing Federation for instructions; the Ministry of Youth and Sports ordered her to drop the bout as part of the Boycott, Divestment and Sanctions campaign. Instead of refusing the fight, which would have resulted in sanctions, Besbes remained completely passive during her bout against Israeli Noam Mills, allowing the latter to strike without offering any resistance. This 5–0 defeat affected her seeding: in her first direct elimination bout, she met eventual gold medallist China's Li Na of China and was largely overcome. Besbes commented afterwards: “I did my duty.”

She qualified to the individual event of the 2012 Summer Olympics as the top-ranked female épée fencer for Africa. She defeated China's Xiaojuan Luo in the round of 32 and Korea's Choi In-jeong in the round of 16 but was defeated in the quarterfinals by eventual silver medallist Britta Heidemann of Germany.

During the 2014–15 season, Besbes was selected by the Tunisian Olympic Committee to be part of a special preparation programme for Rio 2016. She climbed her first World Cup podium with a gold medal in Buenos Aires; this made her the first Tunisian fencer of either gender to win a World Cup event.

She won a bronze medal at the 2015 World Championships.

Besbes again qualified to the individual event of the 2016 Summer Olympics, and reached the quarterfinal. She was ultimately ranked 5th.

She competed at the 2020 Summer Olympics.

She is now a sports teacher in the Lycee Français international Theodore Monod in Saadiyat, Abu Dhabi
