= Tarek Ayad =

Egyptian fencer

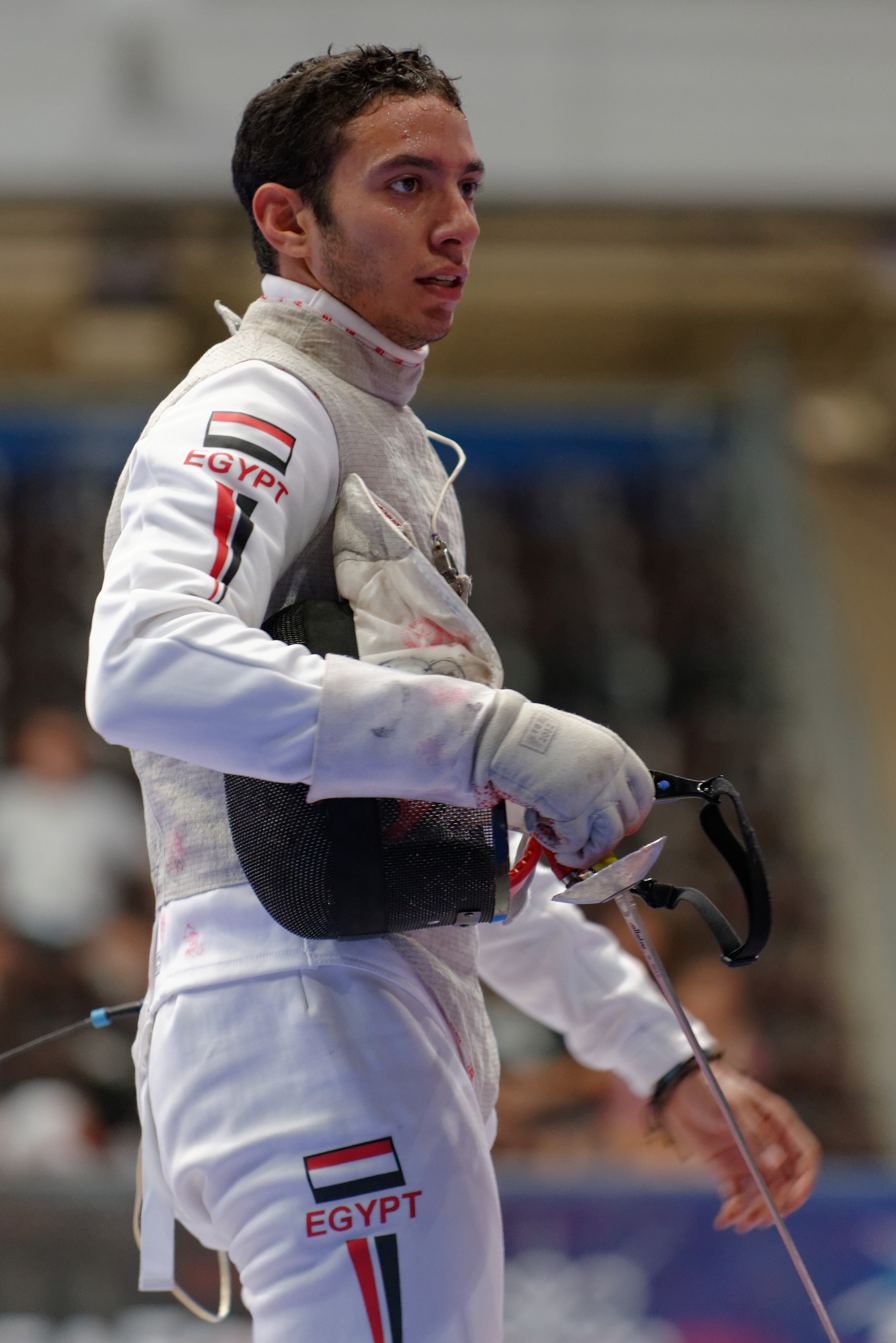
- At the 2013 World Fencing Championships

Personal information
- Full name: Tarek Fouad Muhammad Kamil Ayad
- Nationality: Egyptian
- Born: 29 May 1987 (age 39) Alexandria, Egypt
- Height: 1.8 m (5 ft 11 in)
- Weight: 75 kg (165 lb)

Fencing career
- Sport: Fencing
- Weapon: foil
- Hand: right-handed
- National coach: Sharif al-Bakri
- FIE ranking: current ranking
Medal record
Men's foil
Representing Egypt
African Championships
Gold medal – first place	2010 Tunis	Individual
Silver medal – second place	2009 Dakar	Individual
Silver medal – second place	2012 Casablanca	Individual
Silver medal – second place	2014 Cairo	Individual
Bronze medal – third place	2011 Cairo	Individual
Bronze medal – third place	2013 Cape Town	Individual
Bronze medal – third place	2015 Cairo	Individual
Bronze medal – third place	2016 Algiers	Individual

Tarek Ayad (Arabic: طارق فؤاد محمد كامل عياد; born 29 May 1984) is an Egyptian foil fencer, African champion in 2010. At the 2012 Summer Olympics he competed in the individual event, but was defeated in the table of 32 by Russia's Aleksey Cheremisinov. He originally took up fencing in 1993, after being encouraged by his brother's friend. He competed at the 2016 Olympics, losing to eventual champion Daniele Garozzo in the last 32. He has also won silver and bronze medals at World Cup events.
