= Anissa Khelfaoui =

Algerian fencer (born 1991)

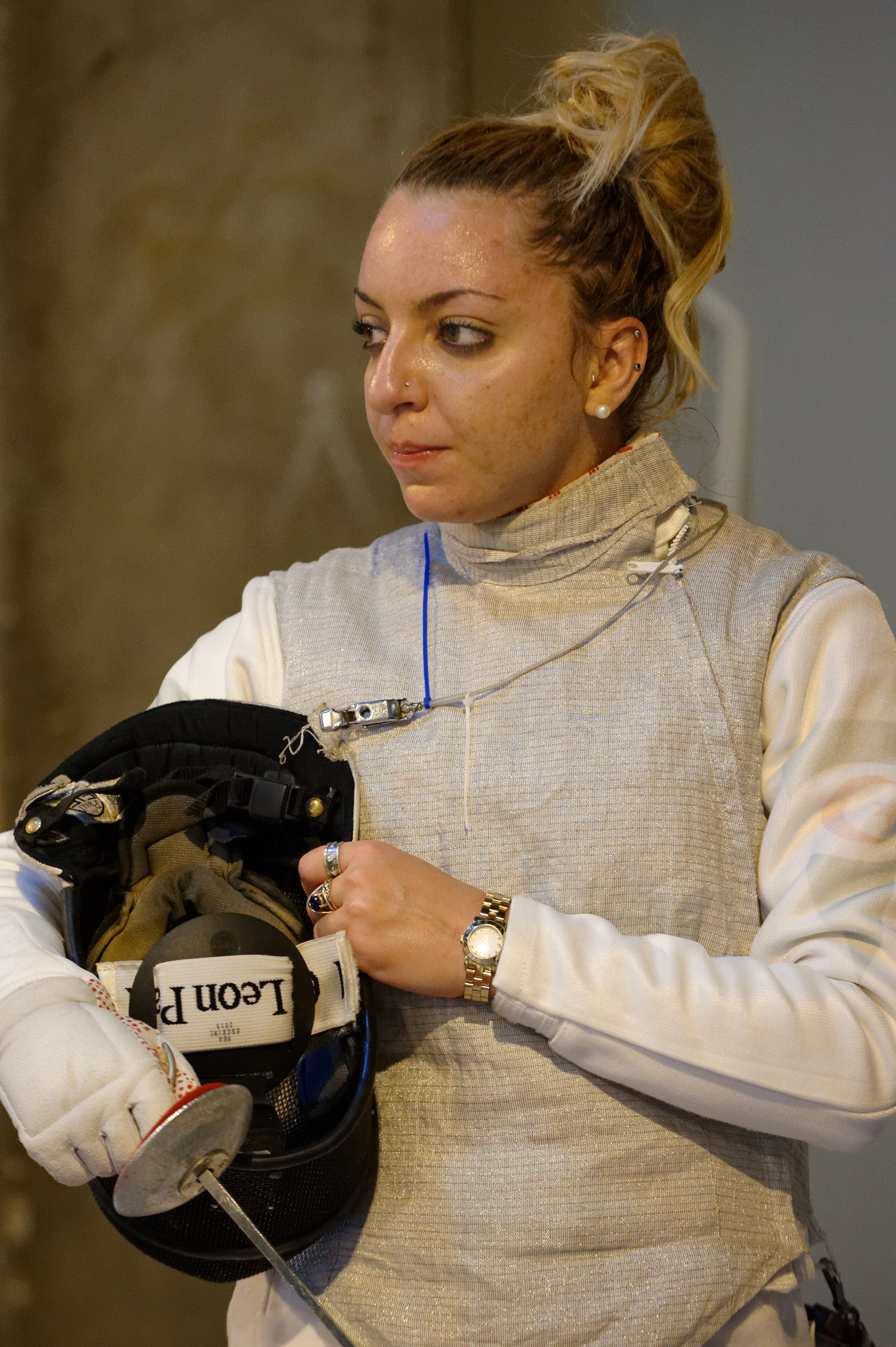
Anissa Khelfaoui in 2015

Anissa Khelfaoui Nassonenko (born August 29, 1991) is an Algerian female fencer.

== Biography ==
Khelfaoui was born in 1991 in Kyiv, Ukraine to an Algerian father and a Ukrainian mother who was a fencing coach.

== Career ==
She competed at the 2008 Olympics, finishing in 38th place.

At the 2012 Summer Olympics she competed in the Women's foil, defeated in the first round 4–15.

She also competed at the 2016 Summer Olympics in the Women's foil, defeated in the first round 6–15.

She has competed in several African fencing championships, winning an individual bronze in 2016, along with a team silver that year. She has also won team bronze medals in 2011, 2013, 2014, 2015 and 2017.
