= Ayman Mohamed Fayez =

Egyptian fencer

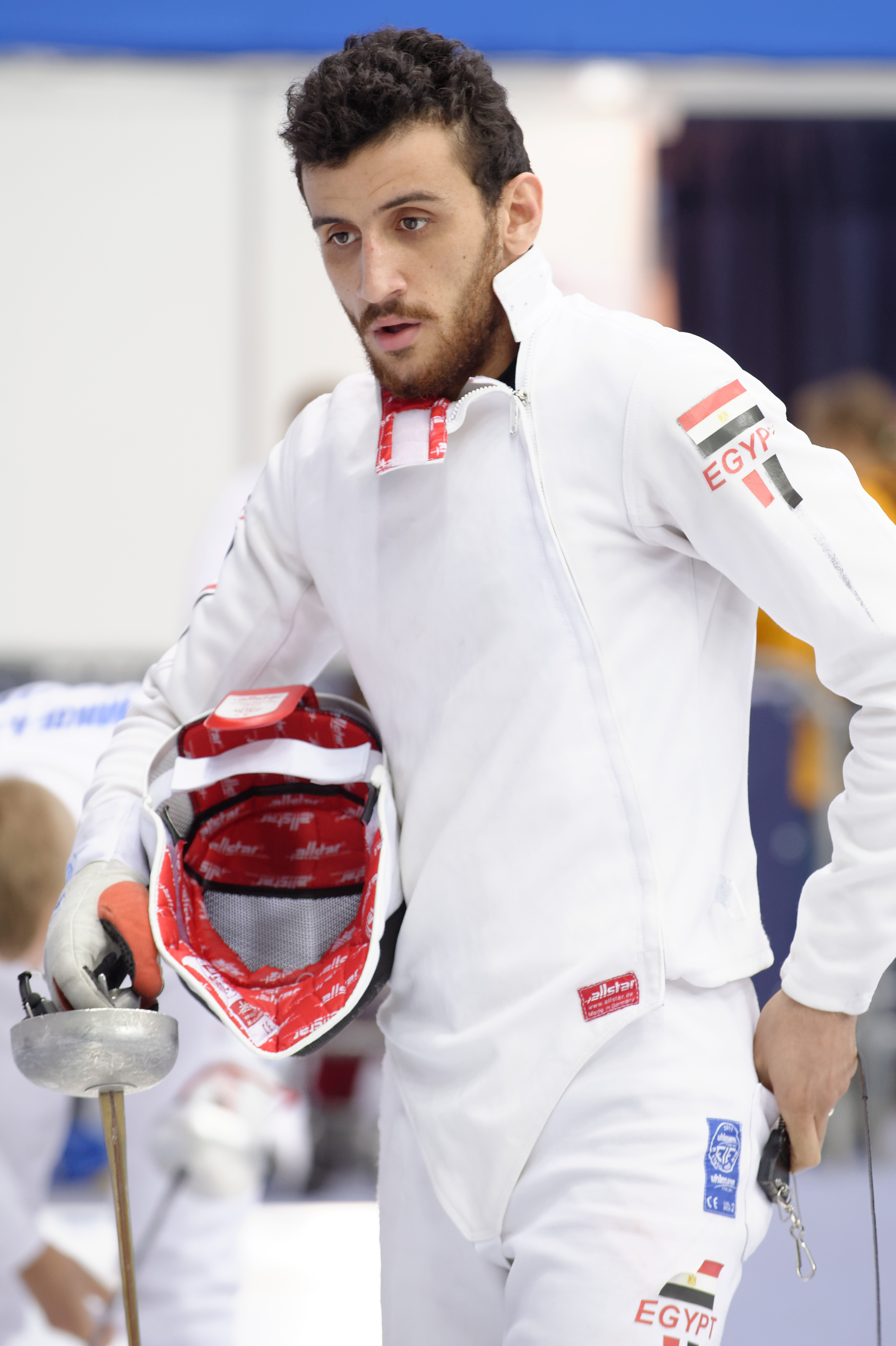

Personal information
- Born: 3 March 1991 (age 35) Giza, Egypt
- Height: 1.80 m (5 ft 11 in)
- Weight: 75 kg (165 lb)

Fencing career
- Sport: Fencing
- Weapon: épée
- Hand: right-handed
- Club: Police Sports Club, Al-Qahira
- FIE ranking: current ranking

Ayman Mohamed Fayez or Ayman Alaa Eldin Mohamed Fayez (born 3 March 1991 Giza, Egypt) is an Egyptian fencer who competed in the 2012 Olympics and 2016 Olympics in Men's Individual Épée.

Fayez was African champion in 2009, 2012 and 2017, also winning gold in the team épée event on all three occasions. In 2008, 2013 and 2015, he won a bronze medal in the individual event and a gold medal in the team event at the African Championships. In 2016, he won a silver medal in the individual and a gold medal in the men's team épée at the African Championships, replicating his results from the 2011 and 2014 African Championships.
