= Hichem Samandi =

Tunisian fencer (born 1986)

Hichem Samandi (born 13 August 1986, Tunis) is a Tunisian fencer. At the 2012 Summer Olympics, he competed in the Men's sabre, but was defeated in the first round.
