= 2023 African Fencing Championships =

The 2023 African Fencing Championships was held at the Hassan Moustafa Sports Hall in Cairo, Egypt from 19 to 23 June 2023.

== Medal summary ==
=== Men's events ===
Event	Gold	Silver	Bronze
Foil	Mohamed Hamza (EGY)	Alaaeldin Abouelkassem (EGY)	Abdelrahman Tolba (EGY); Mohamed Hassan (EGY)
Épée	Mohamed Yasseen (EGY)	Mohamed El-Sayed (EGY)	Ahmed El-Sayed (EGY); Abdelkarim El Haouari (MAR)
Sabre	Ziad El-Sissy (EGY)	Adham Moataz (EGY)	Mohamed Amer (EGY); Evann Jean Abba Girault (NIG)
Team Foil	Egypt; Abdelrahman Tolba; Mohamed Hassan; Youssef Sanaa; Mohamed Hamza	Algeria; Thibaud Bekkat; Tamer Houssam Eddine Berkane; Salim Heroui; Youcef Madi	Senegal; Cheikh Omar Diallo; Gaston Preira; Noe Robin; Bourama Keba Sagnan
Team Épée	Egypt; Mohamed El-Sayed; Ahmed El-Sayed; Ahmad Elsokkary; Mohamed Yasseen	Morocco; Houssam El-Kord; Abdelkarim El Haouari; Omar Nahi; Yehia Ellis	South Africa; Sergey Losevskiy; Harry Saner; Pavel Tychler; Rahul Van Manen
Team Sabre	Egypt; Mohamed Amer; Medhat Moataz; Adham Moataz; Ziad El-Sissy	Tunisia; Lucas Maurice Andre Messica; Ahmed Ferjani; Fares Ferjani; Amenallah Hmissi	Algeria; Akram Bounabi; Adem Abdelhacib; Thibaud Bekkat; Zacharia Bounachada

=== Women's events ===
Event	Gold	Silver	Bronze
Foil	Yara El-Sharkawy (EGY)	Noura Mohamed (EGY)	Meriem Mebarki (ALG); Maxine Esteban (CIV)
Épée	Alexandra Ndolo (KEN)	Ines El Batoul Taleb (ALG)	Aya Hussein (EGY); Chloe Bousfiha (MAR)
Sabre	Saoussen Boudiaf (ALG)	Nada Hafez (EGY)	Zohra Nora Kehli (ALG); Mariam Deghiedy (EGY)
Team Foil	Egypt; Yara Elsharkawy; Noha Hany; Noura Mohamed; Malak Hamza	Algeria; Selma Lilia Benchekor; Meriem Mebarki; Sonia Zeboudj; Yousra Zeboudj	Tunisia; Yasmine Ayari; Nourane B'Chir; Mariem Khiari
Team Épée	Egypt; Nardin Ehab; Shirwit Gaber; Hana Eleraky; Aya Hussein	Morocco; Camilia EL-Kord; Chloe Bousfiha; Saadia Bastos; Sarah Tahra Ellis	Algeria; Ines El Batoul Taleb; Charline Boukheklifa; Yousra Zeboudj; Selma Lilia Benchekor
Team Sabre	Egypt; Nada Hafez; Jana Sherif ElBakry; Elanod Hegazy; Mariam Deghiedy	Algeria; Saoussen Boudiaf; Zohra Nora Kehli; Kaouther Mohamed Belkebir; Abik Boungab	Tunisia; Kenza Lakhoua; Olfa Hezami; Yasmine Daghfous

== Medal table ==
Host

Rank	Nation	Gold	Silver	Bronze	Total
1	Egypt*	10	5	6	21
2	Algeria	1	4	4	9
3	Kenya	1	0	0	1
4	Morocco	0	2	2	4
5	Tunisia	0	1	2	3
6	Ivory Coast	0	0	1	1
6	Niger	0	0	1	1
6	Senegal	0	0	1	1
6	South Africa	0	0	1	1
Totals (9 entries)		12	12	18	42
