= 2021–22 Fencing World Cup =

International fencing competition

The 2021–2022 FIE Fencing World Cup began in September 2021 and ended in July 2022 at the 2022 World Fencing Championships held in Cairo.

== Individual épée ==
=== Men's épée ===
Date	Event	Type	Gold	Silver	Bronze
20 November 2021	Grand Prix de Berne, Bern	World Cup	Rubén Limardo (VEN)	Alexandre Bardenet (FRA)	Romain Cannone (FRA); Andrea Santarelli (ITA)
30 January 2022	Grand Prix du Qatar, Doha	Grand Prix	Yannick Borel (FRA)	Aymerick Gally (FRA)	Davide Di Veroli (ITA); Federico Vismara (ITA)
12 February 2022	Sirius Epee, Sochi	World Cup	Valerio Cuomo (ITA)	Romain Cannone (FRA)	Ihor Reizlin (UKR); Gergely Siklósi (HUN)
6 March 2022	Westend Grand Prix in Memoriam Vass Imre, Budapest	Grand Prix	Rubén Limardo (VEN)	Dávid Nagy (HUN)	Gabriele Cimini (ITA); Niko Vuorinen (FIN)
17 April 2022	Challenge MONAL, Paris	World Cup	Nelson Lopez-Pourtier (FRA)	Ruslan Kurbanov (KAZ)	Alexandre Bardenet (FRA); Máté Tamás Koch (HUN)
1 May 2022	Epee Grand Prix, Cairo	Grand Prix	Yannick Borel (FRA)	Nelson Lopez-Pourtier (FRA)	Alex Fava (FRA); Gergely Siklósi (HUN)
13 May 2022	World Cup, Heidenheim an der Brenz	World Cup	Romain Cannone (FRA)	Houssam El Kord (MAR)	Gabriele Cimini (ITA); Máté Tamás Koch (HUN)
28 May 2022	World Cup, Tbilisi	World Cup	Volodymyr Stankevych (UKR)	Máté Tamás Koch (HUN)	Inochi Ito (JPN); Ihor Reizlin (UKR)
7 June 2022	Pan American Championships, Asunción	Zone Championships	Rubén Limardo (VEN)	Grabiel Lugo (VEN)	Francisco Limardo (VEN); Samuel Gallagher Pelletier (CAN)
10 June 2022	Asian Championships, Seoul	Zone Championships	Koki Kano (JPN)	Komata Akira (JPN)	Lan Minghao (CHN); Park Sang-young (KOR)
15 June 2022	African Championships, Casablanca	Zone Championships	Mohamed El-Sayed (EGY)	Ahmad Elsokkary (EGY)	Bedi Paul Alex Beugre (CIV); Harry Saner (RSA)
19 June 2022	European Championships, Antalya	Zone Championships	Yannick Borel (FRA)	Tristan Tulen (NED)	Alexis Bayard (SUI); Max Heinzer (SUI)
16 July 2022	World Fencing Championships, Cairo	World Championships	Romain Cannone (FRA)	Kazuyasu Minobe (JPN)	Neisser Loyola (BEL); Ihor Reizlin (UKR)

=== Women's épée ===
Date	Event	Type	Gold	Silver	Bronze
19 November 2021	Glaive de Tallinn, Tallinn	World Cup	Joséphine Jacques-André-Coquin (FRA)	Marie-Florence Candassamy (FRA)	Federica Isola (ITA); Alexandra Louis-Marie (FRA)
30 January 2022	Grand Prix du Qatar, Doha	Grand Prix	Katrina Lehis (EST)	Nelli Differt (EST)	Marie-Florence Candassamy (FRA); Erika Kirpu (EST)
12 February 2022	Ciutat de Barcelona, Barcelona	World Cup	Song Se-ra (KOR)	Marie-Florence Candassamy (FRA)	Auriane Mallo (FRA); Aizanat Murtazaeva (RUS)
6 March 2022	Westend Grand Prix in Memoriam Vass Imre, Budapest	Grand Prix	Alberta Santuccio (ITA)	Anna Kun (HUN)	Choi In-jeong (KOR); Katrina Lehis (EST)
1 May 2022	Epee Grand Prix, Cairo	Grand Prix	Choi In-jeong (KOR)	Auriane Mallo (FRA)	Katharine Holmes (USA); Song Se-ra (KOR)
28 May 2022	World Cup, Katowice	World Cup	Choi In-jeong (KOR)	Alberta Santuccio (ITA)	Marie-Florence Candassamy (FRA); Anna Kun (HUN)
7 June 2022	Pan American Championships, Asunción	Zone Championships	Isabel Di Tella (ARG)	Katharine Holmes (USA)	Montserrat Viveros (PAR); Sheila Liliana Tejeda (MEX)
10 June 2022	Asian Championships, Seoul	Zone Championships	Vivian Kong (HKG)	Choi In-jeong (KOR)	Chan Wai Ling (HKG); Nozomi Sato (JPN)
15 June 2022	African Championships, Casablanca	Zone Championships	Nardin Ehab (EGY)	Shirwit Gaber (EGY)	Aya Hussein (EGY); Ndeye Binta Dionge (SEN)
22 June 2022	European Championships, Antalya	Zone Championships	Vlada Kharkova (UKR)	Rossella Fiamingo (ITA)	Mara Navarria (ITA); Martyna Swatowska-Wenglarczyk (POL)
15 July 2022	2022 World Fencing Championships, Cairo	World Championships	Song Se-ra (KOR)	Alexandra Ndolo (GER)	Rossella Fiamingo (ITA); Vivian Kong (HKG)

== Individual foil ==
=== Men's foil ===
Date	Event	Type	Gold	Silver	Bronze
25 September 2021	Satellite, Tashkent	Satellite	Ethan Gassner (USA)	Uladzislau Kurylovich (BLR)	Akhmadillokhon Solikhojiev (UZB); Mukhammad Yusuf Asranov (UZB)
3 October 2021	Satellite, Guadalajara	Satellite	Diego Cervantes (MEX)	Guilherme Toldo (BRA)	Vitālijs Kuceba (LAT); Carlos Daniel López (MEX)
9 October 2021	Trekanten International, Copenhagen	Satellite	Tommaso Marini (ITA)	Andrzej Rzadkowski (POL)	Romain Bel (FRA); Leszek Rajski (POL)
23 October 2021	Golden Foil of Zagreb, Zagreb	Satellite	Daniel Dosa (HUN)	Petar Files (CRO)	Alexander Choupenitch (CZE); Michał Siess (POL)
14 January 2022	Challenge International de Paris, Paris	World Cup	Cheung Ka Long (HKG)	Edoardo Luperi (ITA)	Chase Emmer (USA); Alessio Foconi (ITA)
25 February 2022	National Bank of Egypt Championship, Cairo	World Cup	Anton Borodachev (RUS)	Vladislav Mylnikov (RUS)	Davide Filippi (ITA); Takahiro Shikine (JPN)
17 April 2022	World Cup, Belgrade	World Cup	Tommaso Marini (ITA)	Giorgio Avola (ITA)	Daniel Giacon (NED); Kazuki Iimura (JPN)
30 April 2022	World Cup, Plovdiv	World Cup	Alessio Foconi (ITA)	Daniele Garozzo (ITA)	Tommaso Marini (ITA); Gergő Szemes (HUN)
15 May 2022	Grand Prix, Incheon	World Cup	Tommaso Marini (ITA)	Choi Chun Yin Ryan (HKG)	Maximilien Chastanet (FRA); Alessio Foconi (ITA)
5 June 2022	Pan American Championships, Asunción	Zone Championships	Alexander Massialas (USA)	Maximilien Van Haaster (CAN)	Gerek Meinhardt (USA); Nick Itkin (USA)
12 June 2022	Asian Championships, Seoul	Zone Championships	Cheung Ka Long (HKG)	Mo Ziwei (CHN)	Wu Bin (CHN); Ryan Choi (HKG)
15 June 2022	African Championships, Casablanca	Zone Championships	Alaaeldin Abouelkassem (EGY)	Mohamed Hamza (EGY)	Youcef Madi (ALG); Mohamed Hassan (EGY)
22 June 2022	European Championships, Antalya	Zone Championships	Daniele Garozzo (ITA)	Tommaso Marini (ITA)	Giorgio Avola (ITA); Maximilien Chastanet (FRA)
15 July 2022	2022 World Fencing Championships, Cairo	World Championships	Enzo Lefort (FRA)	Tommaso Marini (ITA)	Cheung Ka Long (HKG); Nick Itkin (USA)

=== Women's foil ===
Date	Event	Type	Gold	Silver	Bronze
25 September 2021	Satellite, Tashkent	Satellite	Marta Cammilletti (ITA)	Maxine Isabel Esteban (PHI)	Madinabonu Parpieva (UZB); Umida Ilyosova (UZB)
3 October 2021	Satellite, Guadalajara	Satellite	Hanna Andreyenka (BLR)	Alely Hernandez (MEX)	Yana Andreyenka (BLR); Nataly Michel (MEX)
10 October 2021	Trekanten International, Copenhagen	Satellite	Olga Rachele Calissi (ITA)	Elena Tangherlini (ITA)	Maria Teresa Diaz (ESP); Beatrice Monaco (ITA)
11 December 2021	Challenge International de Saint-Maur, Saint-Maur-des-Fossés	World Cup	Alice Volpi (ITA)	Lee Kiefer (USA)	Jacqueline Dubrovich (USA); Francesca Palumbo (ITA)
15 January 2022	Adam Mickiewicz University World Cup, Poznań	World Cup	Alice Volpi (ITA)	Eleanor Harvey (CAN)	Chen Qingyuan (CHN); Martina Favaretto (ITA)
26 February 2022	World Cup, Guadalajara	World Cup	Alice Volpi (ITA)	Lee Kiefer (USA)	Olga Rachele Calissi (ITA); Eleanor Harvey (CAN)
17 April 2022	World Cup, Belgrade	World Cup	Anne Sauer (GER)	Leonie Ebert (GER)	Martina Batini (ITA); Lee Kiefer (USA)
30 April 2022	Reinhold-Würth-Cup, Tauberbischofsheim	World Cup	Lee Kiefer (USA)	Anita Blaze (FRA)	Erica Cipressa (ITA); Karin Miyawaki (JPN)
15 May 2022	Grand Prix, Incheon	Grand Prix	Lee Kiefer (USA)	Eleanor Harvey (CAN)	Anne Sauer (GER); Alice Volpi (ITA)
5 June 2022	Pan American Championships, Asunción	Zone Championships	Eleanor Harvey (CAN)	Lee Kiefer (USA)	Jacqueline Dubrovich (USA); Jessica Guo (CAN)
11 June 2022	Asian Championships, Seoul	Zone Championships	Shi Yue (CHN)	Chen Qingyuan (CHN)	Yuka Ueno (JPN); Sera Azuma (JPN)
15 June 2022	African Championships, Casablanca	Zone Championships	Noura Mohamed (EGY)	Youssra Zakarani (MAR)	Noha Hany (EGY); Yara Elsharkawy (EGY)
22 June 2022	European Championships, Antalya	Zone Championships	Leonie Ebert (GER)	Arianna Errigo (ITA)	Ysaora Thibus (FRA); Alice Volpi (ITA)
15 July 2022	2022 World Fencing Championships, Cairo	World Championships	Ysaora Thibus (FRA)	Arianna Errigo (ITA)	Lee Kiefer (USA); Maria Boldor (ROU)

== Individual sabre ==
=== Men's sabre ===
Date	Event	Type	Gold	Silver	Bronze
25 September 2021	Satellite, Plovdiv	Satellite	Francesco D'Armiento (ITA)	Hristo Efimov (BUL)	Dimitar Raikin (BUL); Enver Yildirim (TUR)
13 October 2021	Grand Prix Nuoma, Orléans	Grand Prix	Kim Jung-hwan (KOR)	Luca Curatoli (ITA)	Oh Sang-uk (KOR); Kento Yoshida (JPN)
16 January 2022	World Cup, Tbilisi	World Cup	Sandro Bazadze (GEO)	Kamil Ibragimov (RUS)	Boladé Apithy (FRA); Kim Jung-hwan (KOR)
19 March 2022	Gerevich-Kovács-Kárpáti World Cup, Budapest	World Cup	Áron Szilágyi (HUN)	Luca Curatoli (ITA)	Kim Jung-hwan (KOR); Oh Sang-uk (KOR)
7 May 2022	Villa de Madrid, Madrid	World Cup	Oh Sang-uk (KOR)	Luca Curatoli (ITA)	Sandro Bazadze (GEO); Kim Jung-hwan (KOR)
20 May 2022	Grand Prix, Padua	Grand Prix	Áron Szilágyi (HUN)	Gu Bon-gil (KOR)	Boladé Apithy (FRA); Eliott Bibi (FRA)
3 June 2022	Pan American Championships, Asunción	Zone Championships	Daryl Homer (USA)	Eli Dershwitz (USA)	Pascual María Di Tella (ARG); Andrew Mackiewicz (USA)
10 June 2022	Asian Championships, Seoul	Zone Championships	Gu Bon-gil (KOR)	Kim Jung-hwan (KOR)	Artyom Sarkissyan (KAZ); Oh Sang-uk (KOR)
16 June 2022	African Championships, Casablanca	Zone Championships	Farès Ferjani (TUN)	Medhat Moataz (EGY)	Mohamed Amer (EGY); Ahmed Ferjani (TUN)
17 June 2022	European Championships, Antalya	Zone Championships	Sandro Bazadze (GEO)	Luca Curatoli (ITA)	Eliott Bibi (FRA); Boladé Apithy (FRA)
15 July 2022	World Fencing Championships, Cairo	World Championships	Áron Szilágyi (HUN)	Maxime Pianfetti (FRA)	Iulian Teodosiu (ROU); Sandro Bazadze (GEO)

=== Women's sabre ===
Date	Event	Type	Gold	Silver	Bronze
25 September 2021	Satellite, Plovdiv	Satellite	Yoana Ilieva (BUL)	Valeriya Bolshakova (AZE)	Olga Hramova (BUL); Sabina Karimova (AZE)
13 October 2021	Grand Prix Nuoma, Orléans	Grand Prix	Despina Georgiadou (GRE)	Theodora Gkountoura (GRE)	Svetlana Sheveleva (RUS); Yoon Ji-su (KOR)
16 January 2022	World Cup, Tbilisi	World Cup	Caroline Queroli (FRA)	Theodora Gkountoura (GRE)	Yana Egorian (RUS); Rossella Gregorio (ITA)
29 January 2022	World Cup, Plovdiv	World Cup	Anna Bashta (AZE)	Manon Apithy-Brunet (FRA)	Rossella Gregorio (ITA); Malina Vongsavady (FRA)
5 March 2022	Coupe Acropolis, Athens	World Cup	Anna Bashta (AZE)	Lucía Martín-Portugues (ESP)	Sara Balzer (FRA); Sylwia Matuszak (POL)
19 March 2022	Coupe Bosphorus, Istanbul	World Cup	Manon Apithy-Brunet (FRA)	Anne Poupinet (FRA)	Małgorzata Kozaczuk (POL); Lucía Martín-Portugues (ESP)
7 May 2022	World Cup, Hammamet	World Cup	Misaki Emura (JPN)	Despina Georgiadou (GRE)	Manon Apithy-Brunet (FRA); Kanae Kobayashi (JPN)
20 May 2022	Grand Prix, Padua	Grand Prix	Anna Bashta (AZE)	Risa Takashima (JPN)	Misaki Emura (JPN); Caroline Queroli (FRA)
3 June 2022	Pan American Championships, Asunción	Zone Championships	Anne-Elizabeth Stone (USA)	Gabriella Page (CAN)	Shia Rodríguez (VEN); Madison Thurgood (CAN)
12 June 2022	Asian Championships, Seoul	Zone Championships	Choi Soo-yeon (KOR)	Misaki Emura (JPN)	Fu Ying (CHN); Yang Hengyu (CHN)
15 June 2022	African Championships, Casablanca	Zone Championships	Zohra Nora Kehli (ALG)	Nada Hafez (EGY)	Saoussen Boudiaf (ALG); Mariam Deghiedy (EGY)
22 June 2022	European Championships, Antalya	Zone Championships	Anna Bashta (AZE)	Rossella Gregorio (ITA)	Zuzanna Cieślar (POL); Sara Balzer (FRA)
15 July 2022	2022 World Fencing Championships, Cairo	World Championships	Misaki Emura (JPN)	Anna Bashta (AZE)	Araceli Navarro (ESP); Despina Georgiadou (GRE)

== Team épée ==
=== Men's team épée ===
Date	Event	Gold	Silver	Bronze
21 November 2021	Grand Prix de Berne, Bern	Russia	Spain	Japan
13 February 2022	Sirius Epee, Sochi	Russia	Ukraine	South Korea
17 April 2022	Challenge MONAL, Paris	Hungary	France	Ukraine
14 May 2022	World Cup, Heidenheim an der Brenz	South Korea	Germany	France
29 May 2022	World Cup, Tbilisi	Switzerland	France	Hungary
7 June 2022	Pan American Championships, Asunción	Venezuela	Colombia	Argentina
10 June 2022	Asian Championships, Seoul	South Korea	Uzbekistan	Japan; China
15 June 2022	African Championships, Casablanca	Egypt	Morocco	South Africa
22 June 2022	European Championships, Antalya	Italy	Israel	France
15 July 2022	2022 World Fencing Championships, Cairo	France	Italy	Japan

=== Women's team épée ===
Date	Event	Gold	Silver	Bronze
20 November 2021	Glaive de Tallinn, Tallinn	Russia	Germany	Italy
13 February 2022	Ciutat de Barcelona, Barcelona	France	Russia	Italy
29 May 2022	World Cup, Katowice	South Korea	China	United States
7 June 2022	Pan American Championships, Asunción	Venezuela	Canada	Argentina
10 June 2022	Asian Championships, Seoul	South Korea	Hong Kong	Japan; China
15 June 2022	African Championships, Casablanca	Egypt	Morocco	Algeria
22 June 2022	European Championships, Antalya	France	Italy	Ukraine
15 July 2022	2022 World Fencing Championships, Cairo	South Korea	Italy	Poland

== Team foil ==
=== Men's team foil ===
Date	Event	Gold	Silver	Bronze
16 January 2022	Challenge International de Paris, Paris	Italy	France	United States
27 February 2022	National Bank of Egypt Championship, Cairo	United States	Russia	Italy
18 April 2022	World Cup, Belgrade	Italy	Poland	France
1 May 2022	World Cup, Plovdiv	Italy	France	United States
14 May 2022	World Cup, Heidenheim an der Brenz	South Korea	Germany	France
6 June 2022	Pan American Championships, Asunción	United States	Canada	Brazil
15 June 2022	Asian Championships, Seoul	Japan	South Korea	Hong Kong; Chinese Taipei
15 June 2022	African Championships, Casablanca	Egypt	Algeria	Tunisia
22 June 2022	European Championships, Antalya	Italy	France	Poland
15 July 2022	2022 World Fencing Championships, Cairo	Italy	United States	France

=== Women's team foil ===
Date	Event	Gold	Silver	Bronze
12 December 2021	Challenge International de Saint-Maur, Saint-Maur-des-Fossés	Italy	Japan	Russia
16 January 2022	Adam Mickiewicz University World Cup, Poznań	United States	Japan	Poland
27 February 2022	World Cup, Guadalajara	United States	Italy	Russia
18 April 2022	World Cup, Belgrade	France	Germany	Italy
1 May 2022	Reinhold-Würth-Cup, Tauberbischofsheim	Italy	France	Japan
6 June 2022	Pan American Championships, Asunción	Canada	United States	Chile
15 June 2022	Asian Championships, Seoul	Japan	China	South Korea; Singapore
15 June 2022	African Championships, Casablanca	Egypt	Algeria	Morocco
22 June 2022	European Championships, Antalya	Italy	France	Germany
15 July 2022	2022 World Fencing Championships, Cairo	Italy	United States	France

== Team sabre ==
=== Men's team sabre ===
Date	Event	Gold	Silver	Bronze
17 January 2022	World Cup, Tbilisi	South Korea	Germany	Russia
20 March 2022	Gerevich-Kovács-Kárpáti World Cup, Budapest	Hungary	France	Germany
8 May 2022	Villa de Madrid, Madrid	South Korea	Hungary	Italy
4 June 2022	Pan American Championships, Asunción	United States	Canada	Colombia
13 June 2022	Asian Fencing Championships, Seoul	South Korea	Japan	Iran; Hong Kong
19 June 2022	African Fencing Championships, Casablanca	Tunisia	Egypt	Algeria
22 June 2022	European Fencing Championships, Antalya	Hungary	Ukraine	Turkey
15 July 2022	World Fencing Championships, Cairo	South Korea	Hungary	Italy

=== Women's team sabre ===
Date	Event	Gold	Silver	Bronze
17 January 2022	World Cup, Tbilisi	France	South Korea	Russia
30 January 2022	World Cup, Plovdiv	France	Azerbaijan	Italy
6 March 2022	Coupe Acropolis, Athens	Italy	Japan	United States
20 March 2022	Coupe Bosphorus, Istanbul	South Korea	Spain	Hungary
8 May 2022	World Cup, Hammamet	South Korea	Japan	France
4 June 2022	Pan American Championships, Asunción	United States	Canada	Brazil
15 June 2022	Asian Championships, Seoul	South Korea	Japan	China; Kazakhstan
15 June 2022	African Championships, Casablanca	Algeria	Tunisia	Egypt
22 June 2022	European Championships, Antalya	France	Italy	Ukraine
15 July 2022	2022 World Fencing Championships, Cairo	Hungary	France	Japan
