= 2022 African Fencing Championships =

The 2022 African Fencing Championships was held at the Casablanca's Salle Couverte du Complexe Sportif Mohamed V in Casablanca, Morocco from 15-19 June 2022.

== Medal summary ==
=== Men's events ===
Event	Gold	Silver	Bronze
Foil	Alaaeldin Abouelkassem (EGY)	Mohamed Hamza (EGY)	Youcef Madi (ALG); Mohamed Hassan (EGY)
Épée	Mohamed El-Sayed (EGY)	Ahmad Elsokkary (EGY)	Bedi Paul Alex Beugre (CIV); Harry Saner (RSA)
Sabre	Fares Ferjani (TUN)	Medhat Moataz (EGY)	Mohamed Amer (EGY); Ahmed Ferjani (TUN)
Team Foil	Egypt; Alaaeldin Abouelkassem; Mohamed Hassan; Mohamed Essam; Mohamed Hamza	Algeria; Akram Bounabi; Dani-Adam Fellah; Salim Heroui; Youcef Madi	Tunisia; Mohamed Aziz Cherni; Ali Ghrairi; Mohamed Fadi Nefzi; Mohamed Aziz Metoui
Team Épée	Egypt; Mohamed El-Sayed; Ahmed Elsayed; Ahmad Elsokkary; Mohamed Yasseen	Morocco; Houssam El-Kord; Abdelkarim El Haouari; Omar Nahi; Zacharie Herve Roger	South Africa; Sergey Losevskiy; Harry Saner; Pavel Tychler
Team Sabre	Tunisia; Mohamed Aziz Cherni; Ahmed Ferjani; Fares Ferjani; Amenallah Hmissi	Egypt; Mohamed Amer; Medhat Moataz; Adham Moataz; Ziad El-Sissy	Algeria; Akram Bounabi; Adem Abdelhacib; Menaouer Benreguia

=== Women's events ===
Event	Gold	Silver	Bronze
Foil	Noura Mohamed (EGY)	Youssra Zakarani (MAR)	Noha Hany (EGY); Yara Elsharkawy (EGY)
Épée	Nardin Ehab (EGY)	Shirwit Gaber (EGY)	Aya Hussein (EGY); Ndeye Binta Dionge (SEN)
Sabre	Zohra Nora Kehli (ALG)	Nada Hafez (EGY)	Saoussen Boudiaf (ALG); Mariam Deghiedy (EGY)
Team Foil	Egypt; Yara Elsharkawy; Noha Hany; Noura Mohamed; Mariam ELzoheiry	Algeria; Selma Lilia Benchekor; Meriem Mebarki; Sonia Zeboudj	Morocco; Youssra Zakarani; Ilham Belfkih; Manal Karmaoui
Team Épée	Egypt; Nardin Ehab; Shirwit Gaber; Mennallah Hany; Aya Hussein	Morocco; Camilia EL-Kord; Chloe Bousfiha; Myriam Bouayadi	Algeria; Maroua Gueham; Abik Boungab; Yousra Zeboudj
Team Sabre	Algeria; Saoussen Boudiaf; Zohra Nora Kehli; Kaouther Mohamed Belkebir; Abik Boungab	Tunisia; Rania Ferjani; Olfa Hezami; Yasmine Daghfous	Egypt; Nada Hafez; Zeina Saleh; Sara Shouman; Mariam Deghiedy

== Medal table ==
Host

Rank	Nation	Gold	Silver	Bronze	Total
1	Egypt	8	6	7	21
2	Algeria	2	2	4	8
3	Tunisia	2	1	2	5
4	Morocco*	0	3	1	4
5	South Africa	0	0	2	2
6	Ivory Coast	0	0	1	1
6	Senegal	0	0	1	1
Totals (7 entries)		12	12	18	42
