= Fencing at the 2020 Summer Olympics – Qualification =

This article details the qualifying phase for fencing at the 2020 Summer Olympics (postponed to 2021 due to the COVID-19 pandemic). Qualification was primarily based on the Fédération Internationale d'Escrime (FIE) Official Ranking, with further individual places available at four zonal qualifying tournaments.

For the team events, 8 teams qualified in each event. Each team must be composed of 3 fencers, with a fourth alternate. The top 4 ranked teams qualified. The next-best ranked team from each zone (Africa, the Americas, Europe, and Asia-Oceania) also qualified as long as it was ranked in the top 16. If a zone did not have any team ranked between fifth and sixteenth, the best-placed nation not already qualified was selected regardless of zone.

For individual events the 3 fencers from the team event qualified for individual competition automatically. 6 more places were awarded based on the rankings (ignoring fencers from countries with team qualifications, and considering only the top fencer from each country): the top 2 fencers from each of Europe and Asia-Oceania, and the top 1 fencer from Africa and the Americas. 4 more places (1 per zone) were awarded through zone qualifying tournaments; only countries without a qualified fencer in an event were eligible to participate in these zone qualifying tournaments.

The host country was entitled to 8 quota spots for individual fencers, in addition to those qualified in the above mechanism, respecting the maximum quota of athletes per country (3 per weapon). If enough of these spots will be used to bring to 3 the number of participants in an individual event, the host country will also take part in the corresponding team event, bringing the number of teams to 9. Unused host country spots, should there be any, were to be awarded to other countries through the FIE universality quota and the Tripartite Commission.

French fencer Daniel Jérent initially qualified to fence in the individual and team épée events, but was banned from participating due to a positive urine test for a banned product. Jérent was replaced by Romain Cannone, who competed in the two events in which Jérent was entered, and Ronan Gustin was recalled as a team replacement. Cannone later went on to win the individual event.

American Alen Hadzic initially qualified to fence in team épée on Team USA as a replacement athlete. But he was suspended due to sexual misconduct from competing by the United States Center for SafeSport; he then had his suspension reduced to a lesser sanction by an arbitrator. Ultimately, Hadzic was permanently banned from fencing by SafeSport for his sexual misconduct.

== Timeline ==
Event	Date	Venue
FIE Official Ranking cut-off	April 5, 2021	—
Zonal Qualifier – Africa	April 23, 2021	(Egypt) Cairo
Zonal Qualifier – Europe	April 24–25, 2021	(Spain) Madrid
Zonal Qualifier – Asia & Oceania	April 25–26, 2021	(Uzbekistan) Tashkent
Zonal Qualifier – America	May 1–2, 2021	(Costa Rica) San José

== Qualification summary ==
Nation	Men						Women						Total
Nation	Individual			Team			Individual			Team			Total
Nation	Épée	Foil	Sabre	Épée	Foil	Sabre	Épée	Foil	Sabre	Épée	Foil	Sabre	Total
Algeria		1	1					1	1				4
Argentina									1				1
Azerbaijan									1				1
Brazil		1					1						2
Canada	1	3	1		Yes			3	1		Yes		9
Chile								1					1
China	3	1	1	Yes			3	1	3	Yes		Yes	12
Colombia								1					1
Czech Republic	1	1											2
Egypt	1	3	3		Yes	Yes		3	1		Yes		11
Estonia							3			Yes			3
France	3	3	1	Yes	Yes		1	3	3		Yes	Yes	14
Georgia			1										1
Germany		3	3		Yes	Yes		1					7
Great Britain		1											1
Greece									1				1
Hong Kong		3			Yes		3			Yes			6
Hungary	1		3			Yes		3	3		Yes	Yes	10
India									1				1
Iran			3			Yes							3
Italy	3	3	3	Yes	Yes	Yes	3	3	3	Yes	Yes	Yes	18
Japan	3	3	3	Yes	Yes	Yes	1	3	3		Yes	Yes	16
Kazakhstan	1												1
Kyrgyzstan	1												1
Mexico		1											1
Morocco	1												1
Netherlands	1												1
Peru							1						1
Poland							3	1		Yes			4
Romania			1				1						2
ROC	3	3	3	Yes	Yes	Yes	3	3	3	Yes	Yes	Yes	18
South Korea	3	1	3	Yes		Yes	3	1	3	Yes		Yes	14
Senegal							1						1
Singapore							1	1					2
Spain		1											1
Switzerland	3			Yes									3
Tunisia		1	1				1	1	3			Yes	7
Turkey								1					1
Ukraine	3			Yes			1		1				5
United States	3	3	3	Yes	Yes	Yes	3	3	3	Yes	Yes	Yes	18
Uzbekistan			1				1		1				3
Venezuela	1		1										2
Total: 42 NOCs	36	36	36	9	9	9	34	34	36	8	8	9	212

== Men's events ==
=== Men's Individual épée ===
Standard	Places	Qualified fencer
Members of qualifying teams	24	Yannick Borel (FRA); Alexandre Bardenet (FRA); Romain Cannone (FRA); Andrea Santarelli (ITA); Enrico Garozzo (ITA); Marco Fichera (ITA); Bohdan Nikishyn (UKR); Ihor Reizlin (UKR); Roman Svichkar (UKR); Max Heinzer (SUI); Benjamin Steffen (SUI); Michele Niggeler (SUI); Kweon Young-jun (KOR); Ma Se-geon (KOR); Park Sang-young (KOR); Jacob Hoyle (USA); Curtis McDowald (USA); Yeisser Ramirez (USA); Sergey Bida (ROC); Pavel Sukhov (ROC); Sergey Khodos (ROC); Dong Chao (CHN); Lan Minghao (CHN); Wang Zijie (CHN)
Top 2 individual AOR: Asia & Oceania	2	Masaru Yamada (JPN); Ruslan Kurbanov (KAZ)
Top individual AOR: Africa	1	Houssam El-Kord (MAR)
Top individual AOR: America	1	Rubén Limardo (VEN)
Top 2 individual AOR: Europe	2	Gergely Siklósi (HUN); Bas Verwijlen (NED)
Zonal tournament: Asia & Oceania	1	Roman Petrov (KGZ)
Zonal tournament: Africa	1	Mohamed El-Sayed (EGY)
Zonal tournament: America	1	Marc-Antoine Blais Bélanger (CAN)
Zonal tournament: Europe	1	Jakub Jurka (CZE)
Host country option	2	Kazuyasu Minobe (JPN); Koki Kano (JPN)
Total	36	

=== Men's Team épée ===
Standard	Places	Qualified teams
Top four in FIE Official Team Ranking	4	France; Italy; Ukraine; Switzerland
Top team from Asia & Oceania in positions 5–16	1	South Korea
Top team from America in positions 5–16	1	United States
Top team from Europe in positions 5–16	1	ROC
Re-allocation of unused team quota	1	China
Host country option	1	Japan
Total	9	

=== Men's Individual foil ===
Standard	Places	Qualified fencer
Members of qualifying teams	24	Nick Itkin (USA); Alexander Massialas (USA); Gerek Meinhardt (USA); Enzo Lefort (FRA); Julien Mertine (FRA); Maxime Pauty (FRA); Daniele Garozzo (ITA); Alessio Foconi (ITA); Andrea Cassarà (ITA); Kirill Borodachev (ROC); Anton Borodachev (ROC); Vladislav Mylnikov (ROC); Cheung Ka Long (HKG); Ryan Choi (HKG); Cheung Siu Lun (HKG); Alaaeldin Abouelkassem (EGY); Mohamed Desouky (EGY); Mohamed Hassan (EGY); Maximilien Van Haaster (CAN); Alex Cai (CAN); Eli Schenkel (CAN); Peter Joppich (GER); Benjamin Kleibrink (GER); André Sanità (GER)
Top 2 individual AOR: Asia & Oceania	2	Takahiro Shikine (JPN); Lee Kwang-hyun (KOR)
Top individual AOR: Africa	1	Mohamed Samandi (TUN)
Top individual AOR: America	1	Guilherme Toldo (BRA)
Top 2 individual AOR: Europe	2	Marcus Mepstead (GBR); Carlos Llavador (ESP)
Zonal tournament: Asia & Oceania	1	Huang Mengkai (CHN)
Zonal tournament: Africa	1	Salim Heroui (ALG)
Zonal tournament: America	1	Diego Cervantes (MEX)
Zonal tournament: Europe	1	Alexander Choupenitch (CZE)
Host country option	2	Toshiya Saito (JPN); Kyosuke Matsuyama (JPN)
Total	36	

=== Men's Team foil ===
Standard	Places	Qualified teams
Top four in FIE Official Team Ranking	4	United States; France; Italy; ROC
Top team from Asia & Oceania in positions 5–16	1	Hong Kong
Top team from Africa in positions 5–16	1	Egypt
Top team from America in positions 5–16	1	Canada
Top team from Europe in positions 5–16	1	Germany
Host country option	1	Japan
Total	9	

=== Men's Individual sabre ===
Standard	Places	Qualified fencer
Members of qualifying teams	24	Gu Bon-gil (KOR); Kim Jung-hwan (KOR); Oh Sang-uk (KOR); Luca Curatoli (ITA); Luigi Samele (ITA); Enrico Berrè (ITA); Tamás Decsi (HUN); Áron Szilágyi (HUN); András Szatmári (HUN); Benedikt Wagner (GER); Max Hartung (GER); Matyas Szabo (GER); Mojtaba Abedini (IRI); Ali Pakdaman (IRI); Mohammad Rahbari (IRI); Mohamed Amer (EGY); Ziad El-Sissy (EGY); Mohab Samer (EGY); Eli Dershwitz (USA); Daryl Homer (USA); Andrew Mackiewicz (USA); Kamil Ibragimov (ROC); Konstantin Lokhanov (ROC); Veniamin Reshetnikov (ROC)
Top 2 individual AOR: Asia & Oceania	2	Xu Yingming (CHN); Kento Yoshida (JPN)
Top individual AOR: Africa	1	Farès Ferjani (TUN)
Top individual AOR: America	1	Shaul Gordon (CAN)
Top 2 individual AOR: Europe	2	Boladé Apithy (FRA); Sandro Bazadze (GEO)
Zonal tournament: Asia & Oceania	1	Sherzod Mamutov (UZB)
Zonal tournament: Africa	1	Akram Bounabi (ALG)
Zonal tournament: America	1	José Quintero (VEN)
Zonal tournament: Europe	1	Iulian Teodosiu (ROU)
Host country option	2	Kaito Streets (JPN); Tomohiro Shimamura (JPN)
Total	36	

=== Men's Team sabre ===
Standard	Places	Qualified teams
Top four in FIE Official Team Ranking	4	South Korea; Hungary; Italy; Germany
Top team from Asia & Oceania in positions 5–16	1	Iran
Top team from Africa in positions 5–16	1	Egypt
Top team from America in positions 5–16	1	United States
Top team from Europe in positions 5–16	1	ROC
Host country option	1	Japan
Total	9	

== Women's events ==
=== Women's Individual épée ===
Standard	Places	Qualified fencer
Members of qualifying teams	24	Lin Sheng (CHN); Sun Yiwen (CHN); Zhu Mingye (CHN); Aleksandra Jarecka (POL); Renata Knapik-Miazga (POL); Ewa Trzebińska (POL); Violetta Kolobova (ROC); Aizanat Murtazaeva (ROC); Yulia Lichagina (ROC); Choi In-jeong (KOR); Kang Young-mi (KOR); Song Se-ra (KOR); Kaylin Hsieh (HKG); Vivian Kong (HKG); Coco Lin (HKG); Katharine Holmes (USA); Courtney Hurley (USA); Kelley Hurley (USA); Rossella Fiamingo (ITA); Mara Navarria (ITA); Federica Isola (ITA); Julia Beljajeva (EST); Erika Kirpu (EST); Katrina Lehis (EST)
Top 2 individual AOR: Asia & Oceania	2	Nozomi Sato (JPN); Malika Khakimova (UZB)
Top individual AOR: Africa	1	Sarra Besbes (TUN)
Top individual AOR: America	1	Nathalie Moellhausen (BRA)
Top 2 individual AOR: Europe	2	Ana Maria Popescu (ROM); Coraline Vitalis (FRA)
Zonal tournament: Asia & Oceania	1	Kiria Tikanah (SGP)
Zonal tournament: Africa	1	Ndeye Diongue (SEN)
Zonal tournament: America	1	María Luisa Doig (PER)
Zonal tournament: Europe	1	Olena Kryvytska (UKR)
Total	34	

=== Women's Team épée ===
Standard	Places	Qualified teams
Top four in FIE Official Team Ranking	4	China; Poland; ROC; South Korea
Top team from Asia & Oceania in positions 5–16	1	Hong Kong
Top team from America in positions 5–16	1	United States
Top team from Europe in positions 5–16	1	Italy
Re-allocation of unused team quota	1	Estonia
Total	8	

=== Women's Individual foil ===
Standard	Places	Qualified fencer
Members of qualifying teams	24	Inna Deriglazova (ROC); Adelina Zagidullina (ROC); Larisa Korobeynikova (ROC); Martina Batini (ITA); Arianna Errigo (ITA); Alice Volpi (ITA); Ysaora Thibus (FRA); Pauline Ranvier (FRA); Anita Blaze (FRA); Jacqueline Dubrovich (USA); Lee Kiefer (USA); Nicole Ross (USA); Sera Azuma (JPN); Yuka Ueno (JPN); Rio Azuma (JPN); Jessica Guo (CAN); Eleanor Harvey (CAN); Kelleigh Ryan (CAN); Fanni Kreiss (HUN); Flóra Pásztor (HUN); Kata Kondricz (HUN); Noha Hany (EGY); Yara Elsharkawy (EGY); Noura Mohamed (EGY)
Top 2 individual AOR: Asia & Oceania	2	Jeon Hee-sook (KOR); Chen Qingyuan (CHN)
Top individual AOR: Africa	1	Inès Boubakri (TUN)
Top individual AOR: America	1	Saskia Loretta van Erven Garcia (COL)
Top 2 individual AOR: Europe	2	Leonie Ebert (GER); İrem Karamete (TUR)
Zonal tournament: Asia & Oceania	1	Amita Berthier (SGP)
Zonal tournament: Africa	1	Meriem Mebarki (ALG)
Zonal tournament: America	1	Katina Proestakis (CHI)
Zonal tournament: Europe	1	Martyna Jelińska (POL)
Total	34	

=== Women's Team foil ===
Standard	Places	Qualified teams
Top four in FIE Official Team Ranking	4	ROC; Italy; France; United States
Top team from Asia & Oceania in positions 5–16	1	Japan
Top team from Africa in positions 5–16	1	Egypt
Top team from America in positions 5–16	1	Canada
Top team from Europe in positions 5–16	1	Hungary
Total	8	

=== Women's Individual sabre ===
Standard	Places	Qualified fencer
Members of qualifying teams	24	Sofya Velikaya (ROC); Sofia Pozdniakova (ROC); Olga Nikitina (ROC); Martina Criscio (ITA); Rossella Gregorio (ITA); Irene Vecchi (ITA); Cecilia Berder (FRA); Manon Brunet (FRA); Charlotte Lembach (FRA); Choi Soo-yeon (KOR); Kim Ji-yeon (KOR); Yoon Ji-su (KOR); Qian Jiarui (CHN); Shao Yaqi (CHN); Yang Hengyu (CHN); Nadia Ben Azizi (TUN); Amira Ben Chaabane (TUN); Yasmine Daghfous (TUN); Eliza Stone (USA); Dagmara Wozniak (USA); Mariel Zagunis (USA); Anna Márton (HUN); Liza Pusztai (HUN); Renáta Katona (HUN)
Top 2 individual AOR: Asia & Oceania	2	C. A. Bhavani Devi (IND); Misaki Emura (JPN)
Top individual AOR: Africa	1	Nada Hafez (EGY)
Top individual AOR: America	1	Gabriella Page (CAN)
Top 2 individual AOR: Europe	2	Theodora Goudoura (GRE); Olha Kharlan (UKR)
Zonal tournament: Asia & Oceania	1	Zaynab Dayibekova (UZB)
Zonal tournament: Africa	1	Kaouther Mohamed Belkebir (ALG)
Zonal tournament: America	1	María Belén Pérez Maurice (ARG)
Zonal tournament: Europe	1	Anna Bashta (AZE)
Host country option	2	Chika Aoki (JPN); Norika Tamura (JPN)
Total	36	

=== Women's Team sabre ===
Standard	Places	Qualified teams
Top four in FIE Official Team Ranking	4	ROC; Italy; France; South Korea
Top team from Asia & Oceania in positions 5–16	1	China
Top team from Africa in positions 5–16	1	Tunisia
Top team from America in positions 5–16	1	United States
Top team from Europe in positions 5–16	1	Hungary
Host country option	1	Japan
Total	9	
