= 2018 African Fencing Championships =

The 2018 African Fencing Championships was held at the El Menzah Sports Palace in Tunis, Tunisia from 5 to 9 June 2018.

== Medal summary ==
=== Men's events ===
Event	Gold	Silver	Bronze
Foil	Alaaeldin Abouelkassem (EGY)	Mohamed Ayoub Ferjani (TUN)	Victor Sintès (ALG); Mohamed Essam (EGY)
Épée	Houssam El Kord (MAR)	Ahmad Elsokkary (EGY)	Ahmed Elsayed (EGY); Alexendre Bouzaid (SEN)
Sabre	Fares Ferjani (TUN)	Mohamed Amer (EGY)	Hichem Smandi (TUN); Mohab Samer (EGY)
Team Foil	Egypt; Alaaeldin Abouelkassem; Marwan Ahmed; Mohamed Essam; Mohamed Hamza	Tunisia; Mohamed Ayoub Ferjani; Mohamed Khalil Jouini; Mohamed Aziz Metoui; Mohamed Samandi	Algeria; Roman Djitli; Salim Heroui; Yanis Baptiste Mabed; Victor Sintès
Team Épée	Egypt; Adel Abdelrahman; Ahmed Elsayed; Ahmad Elsokkary; Mahmoud Mohsen	Senegal; Cheikh Omar Diallo; Bourama Keba Sagnan; Seckou Tounkara	Algeria; Menouar Benreguia; Maxime Hichem Cade; Mohamed Cherif Kraria
Team Sabre	Egypt; Mohamed Amer; Ahmed Amr; Mostafa Ayman; Mohab Samer	Tunisia; Amine Akkari; Ahmed Ferjani; Fares Ferjani; Hichem Smandi	Algeria; Akram Bounabi; Hamza Adel Kasdi; Anis Mairi

=== Women's events ===
Event	Gold	Silver	Bronze
Foil	Inès Boubakri (TUN)	Yara Elsharkawy (EGY)	Noha Hany (ALG); Noura Mohamed (EGY)
Épée	Aya Medany (EGY)	Nardin Ehab (EGY)	Gbahi Gwladys Sakoa (CIV); Inès Boubakri (TUN)
Sabre	Azza Besbes (TUN)	Nada Hafez (EGY)	Abik Boungab (ALG); Lina Mohamed (EGY)
Team Foil	Tunisia; Sarra Afi; Inès Boubakri; Haifa Jabri; Fatma Sethom	Algeria; Ines Jade Fellah; Meriem Mebarki; Sonia Zeboudj	Egypt; Yara Elsharkawy; Noha Hany; Noura Mohamed
Team Épée	Egypt; Nardin Ehab; Salwa Gaber; Ayah Mahdy; Aya Medany	Tunisia; Inès Boubakri; Nesrine Ghrib; Maya Mansouri; Feryel Ziden	Algeria; Maroua Gueham; Hanane Laggoune; Yousra Zeboudj
Team Sabre	Tunisia; Amira Ben Chaabane; Azza Besbes; Khadija Chemkhi; Olfa Hezami	Egypt; Logayn Faramawe; Lina Mohamed; Noura Mohamed; Nour Montaser	Algeria; Chaima Benadouda; Amira Hayet Sabah El Hafaia; Ines-Jade Fellah; Meriem Mebarki

== Medal table ==
Host

Rank	Nation	Gold	Silver	Bronze	Total
1	Egypt	6	6	6	18
2	Tunisia*	5	4	2	11
3	Morocco	1	0	0	1
4	Algeria	0	1	8	9
5	Senegal	0	1	1	2
6	Ivory Coast	0	0	1	1
Totals (6 entries)		12	12	18	42
