= Tunisia at the 2020 Summer Olympics =

- IOC code: TUN
- NOC: Tunisian Olympic Committee
- Website: www.cnot.org.tn (in French)

in Tokyo, Japan July 23, 2021 – August 8, 2021
- Competitors: 63 in 16 sports
- Flag bearers (opening): Inès Boubakri; Mehdi Ben Cheikh
- Flag bearer (closing): Ghailene Khattali
- Medals Ranked 58th: Gold 1 Silver 1 Bronze 0 Total 2

Summer Olympics appearances (overview)
- 1960; 1964; 1968; 1972; 1976; 1980; 1984; 1988; 1992; 1996; 2000; 2004; 2008; 2012; 2016; 2020; 2024; 2028

Tunisia competed at the 2020 Summer Olympics in Tokyo. Originally scheduled to take place from 24 July to 9 August 2020, the Games were postponed to 23 July to 8 August 2021, due to the COVID-19 pandemic. Since the nation's official debut in 1960, Tunisian athletes have appeared in every edition of the Summer Olympic Games, except the 1980 Summer Olympics in Moscow because of the nation's partial support for the US-led boycott.

== Medalists ==
Medal	Name	Sport	Event	Date
Gold	Ahmed Hafnaoui	Swimming	Men's 400 m freestyle	25 July
Silver	Mohamed Khalil Jendoubi	Taekwondo	Men's 58 kg	24 July

== Competitors ==
The following is the list of number of competitors in the Games.

Sport	Men	Women	Total
Archery	1	1	2
Athletics	2	1	3
Boxing	0	2	2
Canoeing	2	2	4
Fencing	2	6	8
Judo	0	3	3
Rowing	0	2	2
Sailing	1	3	4
Shooting	1	1	2
Swimming	2	0	2
Table tennis	1	1	2
Taekwondo	1	0	1
Tennis	0	1	1
Volleyball	12	0	12
Weightlifting	3	2	5
Wrestling	6	4	10
Total	34	29	63

== Archery ==
Two Tunisian archers qualified for the men's and women's individual recurve, respectively, at the Games, by finishing in the top two, among those eligible for Olympic qualification, at the 2019 African Games in Rabat, Morocco.

Athlete	Event	Ranking round		Round of 64	Round of 32	Round of 16	Quarterfinals	Semifinals	Final / BM	
Athlete	Event	Score	Seed	Opposition Score	Opposition Score	Opposition Score	Opposition Score	Opposition Score	Opposition Score	Rank
Mohamed Hammed	Men's individual	631	62	Oh J-h (KOR); L 0–6	Did not advance					
Rihab Elwalid	Women's individual	609	59	Román (MEX); L 2–6	Did not advance					
Mohamed Hammed; Rihab Elwalid	Mixed team	1240	28	—N/a		Did not advance				

== Athletics ==
Tunisian athletes further achieved the entry standards, either by qualifying time or by world ranking, in the following track and field events (up to a maximum of 3 athletes in each event):

Key

- Note–Ranks given for track events are within the athlete's heat only
- Q = Qualified for the next round
- q = Qualified for the next round as a fastest loser or, in field events, by position without achieving the qualifying target
- NR = National record
- N/A = Round not applicable for the event
- Bye = Athlete not required to compete in round

Track & road events

Athlete	Event	Heat		Semifinal		Final	
Athlete	Event	Result	Rank	Result	Rank	Result	Rank
Abdessalem Ayouni	Men's 800 m	1:45.73 SB	3 Q	1:44.99 NR	6	Did not advance	
Mohamed Amine Touati	Men's 400 m hurdles	50.58	6	Did not advance			
Marwa Bouzayani	Women's 3000 m steeplechase	9:31.25 PB	6	—N/a		Did not advance	

== Boxing ==
Tunisia entered two female boxers into the Olympic tournament for the first time in history. Khouloud Hlimi (women's featherweight) and Mariem Homrani (women's lightweight) secured their spots by advancing to the final match of their respective weight divisions at the 2020 African Qualification Tournament in Diamniadio, Senegal.

Athlete	Event	Round of 32	Round of 16	Quarterfinals	Semifinals	Final	
Athlete	Event	Opposition Result	Opposition Result	Opposition Result	Opposition Result	Opposition Result	Rank
Khouloud Hlimi	Women's featherweight	Bye	Irie (JPN); L 0–5	Did not advance			
Mariem Homrani	Women's lightweight	Bye	Khelif (ALG); L 0–5	Did not advance			

== Canoeing ==
=== Sprint ===
Tunisian canoeists qualified three boats in each of the following distances for the Games through the 2019 African Games in Rabat, Morocco.

Athlete	Event	Heats		Quarterfinals		Semifinals		Final	
Athlete	Event	Time	Rank	Time	Rank	Time	Rank	Time	Rank
Ghailene Khattali	Men's C-1 1000 m	4:39.791	6 QF	4:35.417	7	Did not advance			
Mohamed Ali Mrabet	Men's K-1 1000 m	4:02.148	5	3:56.325	5	Did not advance			
Khaoula Sassi	Women's K-1 200 m	45.101	5	45.809	6	Did not advance			
Afef Ben Ismail; Khaoula Sassi	Women's K-2 500 m	2:05.770	5	2:10.979	6	Did not advance			

Qualification Legend: FA = Qualify to final (medal); FB = Qualify to final B (non-medal)

== Fencing ==
Tunisian fencers qualified a full squad each in the women's team sabre for the Games as the highest-ranked nation from Africa outside the world's top four in the FIE Olympic Team Rankings. Experienced Olympians Mohamed Samandi (men's foil), Farès Ferjani (men's sabre), Sarra Besbes (women's épée), and Rio 2016 bronze medalist Inès Boubakri scored additional places on the Tunisian team as the highest-ranked fencers vying for qualification from Africa in their respective individual events of the FIE Adjusted Official Rankings.

Men

Athlete	Event	Round of 64	Round of 32	Round of 16	Quarterfinal	Semifinal	Final / BM	
Athlete	Event	Opposition Score	Opposition Score	Opposition Score	Opposition Score	Opposition Score	Opposition Score	Rank
Mohamed Samandi	Foil	Bye	Shikine (JPN); L 4–15	Did not advance				
Farès Ferjani	Sabre	Bye	Berrè (ITA); L 10–15	Did not advance				

Women

Athlete	Event	Round of 64	Round of 32	Round of 16	Quarterfinal	Semifinal	Final / BM	
Athlete	Event	Opposition Score	Opposition Score	Opposition Score	Opposition Score	Opposition Score	Opposition Score	Rank
Sarra Besbes	Épée	Bye	Isola (ITA); L 12–14	Did not advance				
Inès Boubakri	Foil	Bye	Korobeynikova (ROC); L 3–15	Did not advance				
Nadia Ben Azizi	Sabre	Bhavani Devi (IND); L 3–15	Did not advance					
Amira Ben Chaabane	Sabre	Bye	Pusztai (HUN); L 12–15	Did not advance				
Yasmine Daghfous	Sabre	Katona (HUN); L 6–15	Did not advance					
Nadia Ben Azizi; Amira Ben Chaabane; Yasmine Daghfous; Olfa Hezami	Team sabre	—N/a		Japan; L 29–45	Did not advance			

== Judo ==
Tunisia qualified three female judoka for each of the following weight classes at the Games. Nihel Landolsi (women's middleweight, 70 kg), with Nihal Chikhrouhou competing in the women's heavyweight category (+78 kg) at her fourth consecutive Olympics, was selected among the top 18 judoka of their respective weight categories based on the IJF World Ranking List of June 28, 2021, while Ghofran Khelifi (women's lightweight, 57 kg) accepted a continental berth from Africa as the nation's top-ranked judoka outside of direct qualifying position.

Athlete	Event	Round of 32	Round of 16	Quarterfinals	Semifinals	Repechage	Final / BM	
Athlete	Event	Opposition Result	Opposition Result	Opposition Result	Opposition Result	Opposition Result	Opposition Result	Rank
Ghofran Khelifi	Women's –57 kg	Ilieva (BUL); L 00–10	Did not advance					
Nihel Landolsi	Women's –70 kg	Bernholm (SWE); L 00–10	Did not advance					
Nihal Chikhrouhou	Women's +78 kg	Adlington (GBR); W 10–00	Xu Sy (CHN); L 00–10	Did not advance				

== Rowing ==
Tunisia qualified one boat in the women's lightweight double sculls for the Games by winning the gold medal and securing an outright berth at the 2019 FISA African Olympic Qualification Regatta in Tunis.

Athlete	Event	Heats		Repechage		Semifinals		Final	
Athlete	Event	Time	Rank	Time	Rank	Time	Rank	Time	Rank
Nour El-Houda Ettaieb; Khadija Krimi	Women's lightweight double sculls	7:39.61	5 R	7:54.95	5 FC	Bye		7:22.25	16

Qualification Legend: FA=Final A (medal); FB=Final B (non-medal); FC=Final C (non-medal); FD=Final D (non-medal); FE=Final E (non-medal); FF=Final F (non-medal); SA/B=Semifinals A/B; SC/D=Semifinals C/D; SE/F=Semifinals E/F; QF=Quarterfinals; R=Repechage

== Sailing ==
Tunisian sailors qualified one boat in each of the following classes through the 2021 Lanzarote International Regatta and the 2021 Mussanah Open.

Athlete	Event	Race													Net points	Final rank
Athlete	Event	1	2	3	4	5	6	7	8	9	10	11	12	M*	Net points	Final rank
Eya Guezguez; Sarra Guezguez	Women's 49erFX	~~DNF~~	DNC	DNC	DNC	DNC	DNC	UFD	20	20	21	20	21	EL	234	21
Mehdi Gharbi; Rania Rahali	Mixed Nacra 17	19	20	20	20	20	~~DNF~~	20	19	20	DNF	20	20	EL	219	20

M = Medal race; EL = Eliminated – did not advance into the medal race

== Shooting ==
Tunisian shooters achieved quota places for the following events by virtue of their best finishes at the 2018 ISSF World Championships, the 2019 ISSF World Cup series, and African Championships, as long as they obtained a minimum qualifying score (MQS) by May 31, 2020.

Athlete	Event	Qualification		Semifinal		Final	
Athlete	Event	Points	Rank	Points	Rank	Points	Rank
Ala Al-Othmani	Men's 10 m air pistol	563	34	—N/a		Did not advance	
Olfa Charni	Women's 10 m air pistol	570	25	—N/a		Did not advance	
Olfa Charni	Women's 25 m pistol	569	39	—N/a		Did not advance	
Ala Al-Othmani; Olfa Charni	Mixed 10 m air pistol team	561	19	Did not advance			

== Swimming ==
Tunisian swimmers further achieved qualifying standards in the following events (up to a maximum of 2 swimmers in each event at the Olympic Qualifying Time (OQT), and potentially 1 at the Olympic Selection Time (OST)):

Athlete	Event	Heat		Final	
Athlete	Event	Time	Rank	Time	Rank
Ahmed Hafnaoui	Men's 400 m freestyle	3:45.68	8 Q	3:43.36	1st place, gold medalist(s)
Ahmed Hafnaoui	Men's 800 m freestyle	7:49.14	=10	Did not advance	
Oussama Mellouli	Men's 10 km open water	—N/a		1:56:33.3	20

== Table tennis ==
Tunisia entered two athletes into the table tennis competition at the Games. 2010 Youth Olympic bronze medalist Adem Hmam and Fadwa Garci scored their semifinal victories to occupy one of the four available spots each in the men's and women's singles, respectively, at the 2020 African Olympic Qualification Tournament in Tunis.

Athlete	Event	Preliminary	Round 1	Round 2	Round 3	Round of 16	Quarterfinals	Semifinals	Final / BM	
Athlete	Event	Opposition Result	Opposition Result	Opposition Result	Opposition Result	Opposition Result	Opposition Result	Opposition Result	Opposition Result	Rank
Adem Hmam	Men's singles	Bye	Kou (UKR); L 0–4	Did not advance						
Fadwa Garci	Women's singles	Batmönkh (MGL); L 1–4	Did not advance							

== Taekwondo ==
Tunisia entered one athlete into the taekwondo competition at the Games. Mohamed Khalil Jendoubi secured a spot in the men's flyweight category (58 kg) with a top two finish at the 2020 African Qualification Tournament in Rabat, Morocco.

Athlete	Event	Round of 16	Quarterfinals	Semifinals	Repechage	Final / BM	
Athlete	Event	Opposition Result	Opposition Result	Opposition Result	Opposition Result	Opposition Result	Rank
Mohamed Khalil Jendoubi	Men's −58 kg	Artamonov (ROC); W 25–18	Demse (ETH); W 32–9	Jang J (KOR); W 25–19	Bye	Dell'Aquila (ITA); L 12–16	2nd place, silver medalist(s)

== Tennis ==
Tunisia entered one tennis player into the Olympic tournament. Playing in the court at her third straight Games, Ons Jabeur (world no. 26) qualified directly as one of the top 56 official entrants in the women's singles based on the WTA World Rankings of June 13, 2021.

Athlete	Event	Round of 64	Round of 32	Round of 16	Quarterfinals	Semifinals	Final / BM	
Athlete	Event	Opposition Score	Opposition Score	Opposition Score	Opposition Score	Opposition Score	Opposition Score	Rank
Ons Jabeur	Women's singles	Suárez (ESP); L 4–6, 1–6	Did not advance					

== Volleyball ==
=== Indoor ===
Summary

Team	Event	Group Stage						Quarterfinal	Semifinal	Final / BM	
Team	Event	Opposition Score	Opposition Score	Opposition Score	Opposition Score	Opposition Score	Rank	Opposition Score	Opposition Score	Opposition Score	Rank
Tunisia men's	Men's tournament	Brazil; L 0–3	France; L 0–3	United States; L 1–3	Argentina; L 2–3	ROC; L 0–3	6	Did not advance			

==== Men's tournament ====
Tunisia men's volleyball team qualified for the Olympics by winning the pool round with three match points and securing an outright berth at the African Olympic Qualification Tournament in Cairo, Egypt, marking the country's recurrence to the sport after an eight-year absence.

Team roster

The following is the Tunisia roster.

Head coach: (Italy) Antonio Giacobbe

- 2 Ahmed Kadhi MB
- 3 Khaled Ben Slimene S
- 6 Mohamed Ali Ben Othmen Miladi OH
- 7 Elyes Karamosli OH
- 9 Omar Agrebi MB
- 10 Hamza Nagga OP
- 11 Ismaïl Moalla OH
- 12 Mehdi Ben Cheikh (c) S
- 13 Selim Mbareki MB
- 15 Wassim Ben Tara OP
- 19 Aymen Bouguerra OH
- 20 Saddem Hmissi L

Group play

Pos	Team	Pld	W	L	Pts	SW	SL	SR	SPW	SPL	SPR	Qualification
1	ROC	5	4	1	12	13	5	2.600	427	397	1.076	Quarterfinals
2	Brazil	5	4	1	10	12	8	1.500	476	450	1.058	Quarterfinals
3	Argentina	5	3	2	8	12	10	1.200	476	464	1.026	Quarterfinals
4	France	5	2	3	8	10	10	1.000	449	442	1.016	Quarterfinals
5	United States	5	2	3	6	8	10	0.800	432	412	1.049	
6	Tunisia	5	0	5	1	3	15	0.200	339	434	0.781	

Source: Tokyo 2020 and FIVB
Rules for classification: Tiebreakers

24 July 2021; 12:02 v	Brazil	3–0	Tunisia	Ariake Arena, Tokyo; Referees: Hamid Al-Rousi (UAE), Fabrice Collados (FRA)
24 July 2021; 12:02 v	(25–22, 25–20, 25–15); Results Statistics			Ariake Arena, Tokyo; Referees: Hamid Al-Rousi (UAE), Fabrice Collados (FRA)

26 July 2021; 16:25 v	France	3–0	Tunisia	Ariake Arena, Tokyo; Referees: Vladimir Simonović (SRB), Kang Joo-hee (KOR)
26 July 2021; 16:25 v	(25–21, 25–11, 25–21); Results Statistics			Ariake Arena, Tokyo; Referees: Vladimir Simonović (SRB), Kang Joo-hee (KOR)

28 July 2021; 11:05 v	United States	3–1	Tunisia	Ariake Arena, Tokyo; Referees: Evgeny Makshanov (RUS), Sumie Myoi (JPN)
28 July 2021; 11:05 v	(25–14, 23–25, 25–14, 25–23); Results Statistics			Ariake Arena, Tokyo; Referees: Evgeny Makshanov (RUS), Sumie Myoi (JPN)

30 July 2021; 16:30 v	Argentina	3–2	Tunisia	Ariake Arena, Tokyo; Referees: Juraj Mokrý (SVK), Wojciech Maroszek (POL)
30 July 2021; 16:30 v	(23–25, 23–25, 25–19, 25–18, 15–8); Results Statistics			Ariake Arena, Tokyo; Referees: Juraj Mokrý (SVK), Wojciech Maroszek (POL)

1 August 2021; 14:25 v	ROC	3–0	Tunisia	Ariake Arena, Tokyo; Referees: Luis Macias (MEX), Patricia Rolf (USA)
1 August 2021; 14:25 v	(25–20, 25–22, 25–16); Results Statistics			Ariake Arena, Tokyo; Referees: Luis Macias (MEX), Patricia Rolf (USA)

== Weightlifting ==
Tunisia entered five weightlifters (three men and two women) into the Olympic competition. Rio 2016 Olympian Karem Ben Hnia finished sixth of the eight highest-ranked weightlifters in the men's 73 kg category based on the IWF Absolute World Rankings, with rookies Ramzi Bahloul (men's 81 kg), Aymen Bacha (men's 109 kg), Chaima Rahmouni (women's 64 kg), and 2014 Youth Olympic bronze medalist Nouha Landoulsi (women's 55 kg) topping the field of weightlifters vying for qualification from Africa in their respective weight categories based on the IWF Absolute Continental Rankings.

Athlete	Event	Snatch		Clean & Jerk		Total	Rank
Athlete	Event	Result	Rank	Result	Rank	Total	Rank
Karem Ben Hnia	Men's –73 kg	153	5	185	6	338	6
Ramzi Bahloul	Men's –81 kg	136	14	164	12	300	12
Aymen Bacha	Men's –109 kg	177	9	211	9	388	9
Nouha Landoulsi	Women's –55 kg	88	8	108	8	196	8
Chaima Rahmouni	Women's –64 kg	91	12	~~111~~	DNF	91	DNF

== Wrestling ==
Tunisia qualified ten wrestlers for each of the following classes into the Olympic competition; all of whom advanced to the top two finals to book Olympic spots in the men's freestyle (65 and 97 kg), men's Greco-Roman (67, 77, 97, and 130 kg) and women's freestyle wrestling (50, 57, 62, and 76 kg) at the 2021 African & Oceania Qualification Tournament in Hammamet.

Key:

- VT (ranking points: 5–0 or 0–5) – Victory by fall.
- VB (ranking points: 5–0 or 0–5) – Victory by injury (VF for forfeit, VA for withdrawal or disqualification)
- PP (ranking points: 3–1 or 1–3) – Decision by points – the loser with technical points.
- PO (ranking points: 3–0 or 0–3) – Decision by points – the loser without technical points.
- ST (ranking points: 4–0 or 0–4) – Great superiority – the loser without technical points and a margin of victory of at least 8 (Greco-Roman) or 10 (freestyle) points.
- SP (ranking points: 4–1 or 1–4) – Technical superiority – the loser with technical points and a margin of victory of at least 8 (Greco-Roman) or 10 (freestyle) points.

Freestyle

Athlete	Event	Round of 16	Quarterfinal	Semifinal	Repechage	Final / BM	
Athlete	Event	Opposition Result	Opposition Result	Opposition Result	Opposition Result	Opposition Result	Rank
Haithem Dakhlaoui	Men's −65 kg	Ghiasi (IRI); L 1–3 ^{PP}	Did not advance				13
Mohamed Saadaoui	Men's −97 kg	Nurov (MKD); L 0–3 ^{PO}	Did not advance				15
Sarra Hamdi	Women's −50 kg	Bisla (IND); W 3–1 ^{PP}	Stadnik (AZE); L 0–4 ^{ST}	Did not advance			9
Siwar Bousetta	Women's −57 kg	Kit (UKR); L 0–5 ^{VT}	Did not advance				15
Marwa Amri	Women's −62 kg	Johansson (SWE); L 1–3 ^{PP}	Did not advance				15
Zaineb Sghaier	Women's −76 kg	Gray (USA); L 0–5 ^{VT}	Did not advance		Adar (TUR); L 0–3 ^{PO}	Did not advance	16

Greco-Roman

Athlete	Event	Round of 16	Quarterfinal	Semifinal	Repechage	Final / BM	
Athlete	Event	Opposition Result	Opposition Result	Opposition Result	Opposition Result	Opposition Result	Rank
Souleymen Nasr	Men's −67 kg	Al-Obaidi (EOR); L 0–4 ^{ST}	Did not advance				15
Lamjed Maafi	Men's −77 kg	Makhmudov (KGZ); L 0–4 ^{ST}	Did not advance				13
Haykel Achouri	Men's −97 kg	Michalik (POL); L 0–4 ^{ST}	Did not advance				16
Amine Guennichi	Men's −130 kg	Acosta (CHI); L 1–3 ^{PP}	Did not advance				11
