= 2024 African Fencing Championships =

The 2024 African Fencing Championships was held at the Casablanca's Salle Couverte du Complexe Sportif Mohamed V in Casablanca, Morocco from 6 to 10 June 2024

== Medal summary ==
=== Men's events ===
Event	Gold	Silver	Bronze
Foil	Mohamed Hamza (EGY)	Abdelrahman Tolba (EGY)	Jérémy Keryhuel (CIV); Alaaeldin Abouelkassem (EGY)
Épée	Mohamed El-Sayed (EGY)	Houssam El Kord (MAR)	Bedi Beugre (CIV); Mohamed Yasseen (EGY)
Sabre	Mohamed Amer (EGY)	Adham Moataz (EGY)	Evann Girault (NIG); Ziad El-Sissy (EGY)
Team Foil	Egypt; Alaaeldin Abouelkassem; Mohamed Essam; Mohamed Hamza; Abdelrahman Tolba	Morocco; Ahmed El Akkad; Amir El Rhazzouly; Amine Faleh; Anouar Lachiri	Senegal; Famara Diame; Noe Robin; Bourama Sagnan
Team Épée	Egypt; Mohamed El-Sayed; Ahmed El-Sayed; Mahmoud Mohsen; Mohamed Yasseen	Morocco; Abdelkarim El Haouari; Houssam El-Kord; Yehia Ellis; Amine Faleh	South Africa; Sergey Losevskiy; Michael Malahe; Harry Saner
Team Sabre	Tunisia; Mohamed Cherni; Fares Ferjani; Ahmed Ferjani; Amenallah Hmissi	Egypt; Mohamed Amer; Ziad El-Sissy; Yassin Khodir; Medhat Moataz	Morocco; Walid Elfalji; Nadir Hanane; Jihad Kabbaj; Ali Maftouh

=== Women's events ===
Event	Gold	Silver	Bronze
Foil	Yara El-Sharkawy (EGY)	Maxine Esteban (CIV)	Malak Hamza (EGY); Noha Hany (EGY)
Épée	Alexandra Ndolo (KEN)	Camélia El Kord (MAR)	Aya Hussein (EGY); Shirwit Gaber (EGY)
Sabre	Lorina Essomba (CMR)	Nagwa Nofal (EGY)	Renad Eldoksh (EGY); Nada Hafez (EGY)
Team Foil	Egypt; Sara Amr Hossny; Yara Elsharkawy; Malak Hamza; Noha Hany	Tunisia; Yasmine Ayari; Nourane B'Chir; Mariem Khiari; Yasmine Soussi	Morocco; Camélia El Kord; Manal Karmaoui; Manal Saraa
Team Épée	Egypt; Nardin Ehab; Shirwit Gaber; Aya Hussein; Loulwa Soliman	South Africa; Ivana Simic; Phakama Yantolo; Phumza Yantolo	Morocco; Dounia Altoutouhen; Camilia EL-Kord; Sarah Tahra Ellis; Husna Tasnim Ellis
Team Sabre	Egypt; Renad Eldoksh; Nada Hafez; Alanod Hegazy; Nagwa Nofal	Tunisia; Aicha Bouajina; Yasmine Daghfous; Rania Ferjani; Yasmine Rezgui	Morocco; Meriam Aboutaleb; Hiba Dahbi; Ines Hnaini; Manal Saraa

== Medal table ==
Host

Rank	Nation	Gold	Silver	Bronze	Total
1	Egypt	9	4	9	22
2	Tunisia	1	2	0	3
3	Cameroon	1	0	0	1
3	Kenya	1	0	0	1
5	Morocco*	0	4	4	8
6	Ivory Coast	0	1	2	3
7	South Africa	0	1	1	2
8	Niger	0	0	1	1
8	Senegal	0	0	1	1
Totals (9 entries)		12	12	18	42
