= 2017 African Fencing Championships =

The 2017 African Fencing Championships were held in Cairo, Egypt from 8 to 12 June.

== Medal summary ==
=== Men's events ===
Event	Gold	Silver	Bronze
Foil	Alaaeldin Abouelkassem (EGY)	Mohamed Samandi (TUN)	Jérémy Keryhuel (CIV); Mohamed Essam (EGY)
Épée	Ayman Mohamed Fayez (EGY)	Satya Gunput (MRI)	Ahmed El-Saghir (EGY); Alexendre Bouzaid (SEN)
Sabre	Fares Ferjani (TUN)	Hichem Smandi (TUN)	Ihen Ben Chaabene (TUN); Ziad Elsissy (EGY)
Team Foil	Egypt	Tunisia	South Africa
Team Épée	Egypt	Morocco	Senegal
Team Sabre	Tunisia	Egypt	Senegal

=== Women's events ===
Event	Gold	Silver	Bronze
Foil	Inès Boubakri (TUN)	Yara Elsharkawy (EGY)	Anissa Khelfaoui (ALG); Noura Mohamed (EGY)
Épée	Gbahi Gwladys Sakoa (CIV)	Salwa Gaber (EGY)	Shirwit Gaber (EGY); Maya Mansouri (TUN)
Sabre	Azza Besbes (TUN)	Yosra Ghrairi (TUN)	Meriem Ahmed (EGY); Logayn Faramawe (EGY)
Team Foil	Egypt	Algeria	Tunisia
Team Épée	Tunisia	Egypt	South Africa
Team Sabre	Tunisia	Egypt	Algeria

== Medal table ==
Host

Rank	Nation	Gold	Silver	Bronze	Total
1	Egypt*	6	4	7	17
2	Tunisia	5	5	3	13
3	Ivory Coast	1	0	1	2
4	Algeria	0	1	1	2
5	Mauritius	0	1	0	1
5	Morocco	0	1	0	1
7	Senegal	0	0	4	4
8	South Africa	0	0	2	2
Totals (8 entries)		12	12	18	42
