= 2013 African Fencing Championships =

The 2013 African Fencing Championships were the thirteenth edition of a top-level fencing competition organized by the African Fencing Confederation.

The events were held in Cape Town, South Africa from 25 to 29 June at the University of Cape Town.

== Medal summary ==
- source

=== Men's events ===
Event	Gold	Silver	Bronze
Foil	Mohamed Ayoub Ferjani (TUN)	Mohamed Essam (EGY)	Tarek Ayad (EGY); Mohamed Samandi (TUN)
Épée	Khaled Buhdeima (LBA)	Ahmed Nabil (EGY)	Ayman Mohamed Fayez (EGY); Abdelkarim El Haouari (MAR)
Sabre	Hichem Samandi (TUN)	Ahmed Amr (EGY)	Ziad Elsissy (EGY); Ibrahima Keita (SEN)
Team Foil	Egypt	Tunisia	South Africa
Team Épée	Egypt	Morocco	South Africa
Team Sabre	Egypt	Tunisia	Senegal

=== Women's events ===
Event	Gold	Silver	Bronze
Foil	Inès Boubakri (TUN)	Eman Gaber (EGY)	Anissa Khelfaoui (ALG); Noha Wasfy (EGY)
Épée	Sarra Besbes (TUN)	Ayah Mahdy (EGY)	Juliana Barrett (RSA)} Inès Boubakri (TUN)
Sabre	Azza Besbes (TUN)	Mennatalla Ahmed (EGY)	Mame Awa Ndao (SEN); Mariam El Sway (EGY)
Team Foil	Tunisia	Egypt	Senegal
Team Épée	Tunisia	South Africa	Egypt
Team Sabre	Tunisia	Egypt	South Africa

=== Medal table ===
Rank	Nation	Gold	Silver	Bronze	Total
1	Tunisia	8	2	2	12
2	Egypt	3	8	6	17
3	Libya	1	0	0	1
4	South Africa	0	1	4	5
5	Morocco	0	1	1	2
6	Senegal	0	0	4	4
7	Algeria	0	0	1	1
Totals (7 entries)		12	12	18	42
