= Mohamed Essam (fencer) =

Egyptian fencer (born 1994)

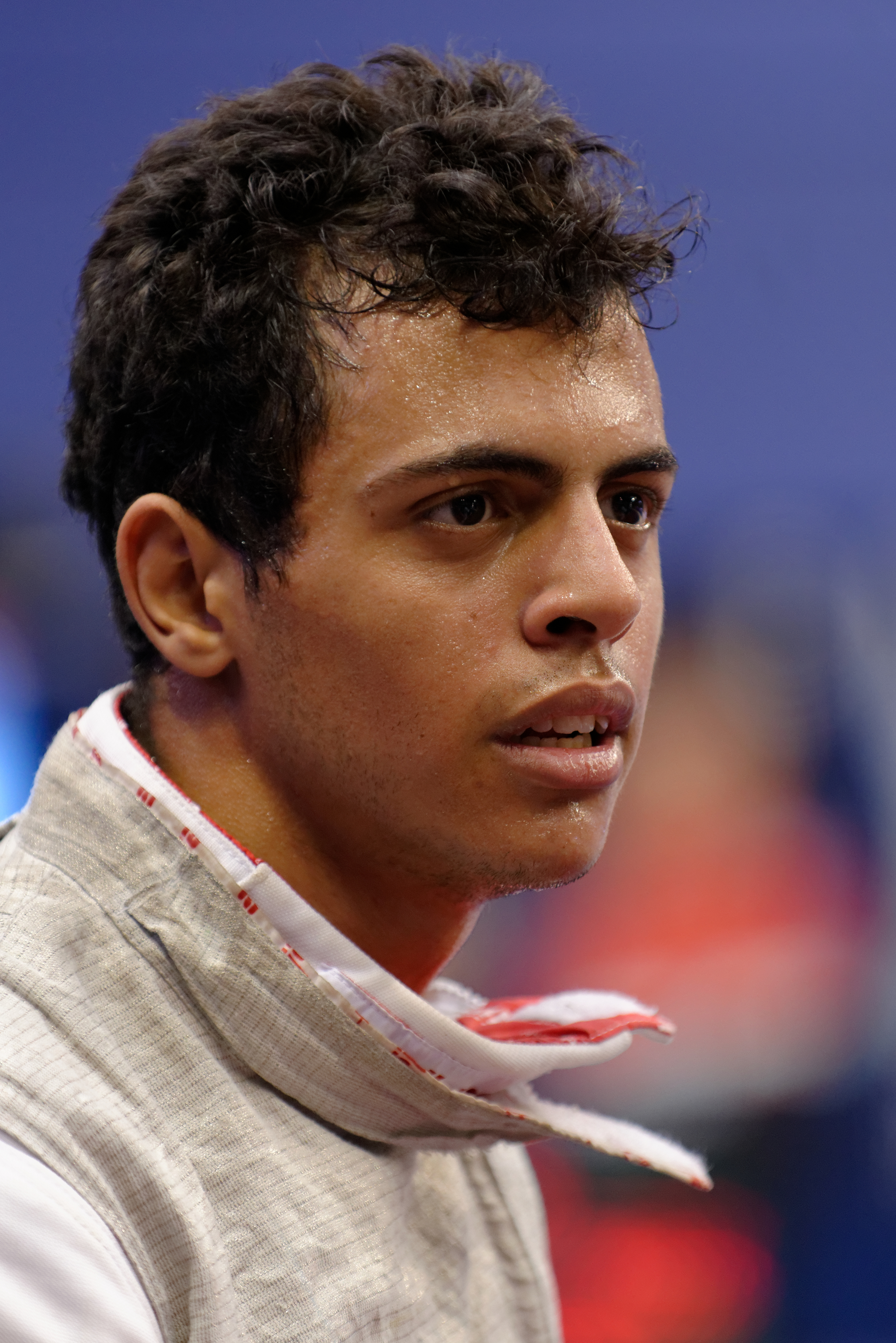
- Mohamed Essam in 2014

Personal information
- Full name: Mohamed Essameldin Mohamed Hassanin
- Nationality: Egypt
- Born: 6 December 1994 (age 31) Cairo, Egypt
- Home town: New York, USA
- Height: 1.80 m (5 ft 11 in)

Fencing career
- Sport: Fencing
- Weapon: Foil
- Hand: right-handed
- FIE ranking: current ranking
Medal record
Men's foil
Representing Egypt
African Games
Bronze medal – third place	2015 Brazzaville	Individual foil
Tournoi Satellite
Bronze medal – third place	2018 Amsterdam	Individual foil
African Championships
Gold medal – first place	2024 Casablanca	Team foil
Gold medal – first place	2022 Casablanca	Team foil
Gold medal – first place	2019 Bamako	Team foil
Bronze medal – third place	2018 Tunis	Individual foil
Gold medal – first place	2018 Tunis	Team foil
Gold medal – first place	2017 Cairo	Team foil
Bronze medal – third place	2017 Cairo	Individual foil
Gold medal – first place	2016 Algiers	Team foil
Gold medal – first place	2015 Cairo	Team foil
Gold medal – first place	2014 Cairo	Team foil
Gold medal – first place	2013 Capetown	Team foil
Silver medal – second place	2013 Capetown	Individual foil

Mohamed Essam (born 6 December 1994) is an Egyptian fencer. He competed in the men's foil event at the 2016 Summer Olympics and men's foil team events at the 2024 Summer Olympics.
