= Victor Sintès =

French fencer

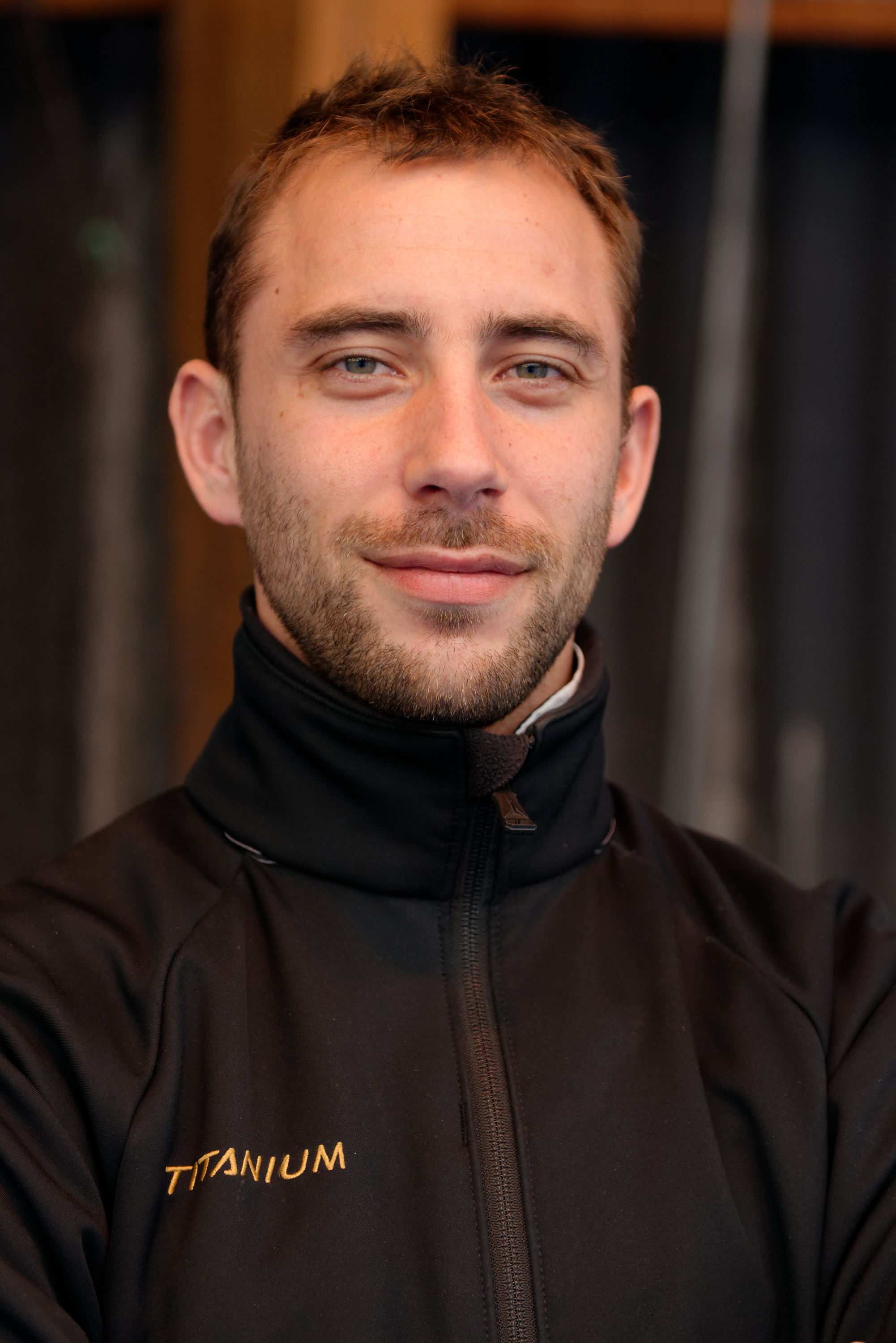
- Sintès at the Challenge Revenu 2013

Personal information
- Nationality: French, Algerian
- Born: 8 August 1980 (age 45) Caen, Normandy, France
- Height: 1.70 m (5 ft 7 in)
- Weight: 64 kg (141 lb)

Fencing career
- Sport: Fencing
- Country: France and now Algeria
- Weapon: foil
- Hand: right-handed
- FIE ranking: current ranking

Victor Sintès (born 8 August 1980 in Caen, Normandy, France) is a former French fencer who now represents Algeria internationally. At the 2012 Summer Olympics he competed for France in the Men's foil, but was defeated in the third round.

At the 2016 Summer Olympics, Victor represented Algeria in Men's foil. He was defeated in the first round 4–15.

== Biography ==
Having trained at the Cercle d'Escrime de Rueil, Sintès made his international debut for the French national team in the early 2000s.

He won the silver medal in the team event at the European Fencing Championships in Moscow 2002, together with Nicolas Beaudan, Érik Friess and Jérôme Weibel.

He reached the podium at the 2004 French Championships, claiming the bronze medal in the individual event.

The following year he achieved the first major success of his career by winning the gold medal in the team event at the World Fencing Championships in Leipzig 2005, alongside Erwann Le Péchoux, Brice Guyart and Nicolas Beaudan.

At the 2010 French Championships, he won the team silver medal at the national championships held in Nantes.

At the European Fencing Championships in Sheffield 2011, he won the team silver medal alongside Erwann Le Péchoux, Brice Guyart and Marcel Marcilloux. A few months later, at the World Fencing Championships in Catania 2011, he claimed another team silver medal with the same teammates, as well as the bronze medal in the individual event, his best personal result at a World Championships. He was defeated in the semi-finals by Italy's Andrea Cassarà, who went on to win the world title. Later that year, he also won the team silver medal at the French Championships in Valence.

He claimed a second consecutive team silver medal at the European Fencing Championships in Legnano 2012, competing alongside Erwann Le Péchoux, Enzo Lefort and Brice Guyart.

He made his Olympic debut at London 2012, representing France. In the individual event, he advanced through the opening round before being eliminated in the round of 32 by China's Lei Sheng, who would go on to win the Olympic gold medal. He also competed in the team event with the French squad, alongside Erwann Le Péchoux, Marcel Marcilloux and Enzo Lefort, finishing in eighth place.

In 2013, he was dismissed from INSEP and the French national team after publicly criticizing officials of the French Fencing Federation. He subsequently decided to continue his international career representing Algeria, the country of origin of his mother's family. The nephew of former footballer Abdelhamid Bensegueni, who played for OGC Nice during the 1940s, he obtained Algerian sporting nationality and an Algerian passport in October 2014.

The following month, the executive committee of the French Fencing Federation rejected his request to be exempted from the three-year waiting period required by the International Fencing Federation (FIE) for a change of sporting nationality, preventing him from immediately representing Algeria in official competitions. Backed by the Algerian Fencing Federation, he subsequently appealed the decision to the FIE Executive Committee.

During this period, he worked full-time as a physiotherapist while continuing his competitive career. Despite being unable to compete internationally, he won the French team title at the 2014 national championships in Muret, a feat he repeated the following year in Marseille.

In 2016, he finally became eligible to compete for the Algerian national team. In April of the same year, he won the African Olympic Qualification Tournament, defeating Morocco's Xavier Ali Lahoussine (15–5) in the semi-finals and Senegal's Babacar Kadam (15–4) in the final. At the African Fencing Championships in Algiers 2016, he won the silver medal in the individual event and the bronze medal in the team event, alongside Yanis Baptiste Mabed, Salim Heroui and Youcef Madi.

He subsequently represented Algeria at the Olympic Games in Rio de Janeiro 2016, where he was eliminated in the early rounds of the individual event, finishing 28th out of 35 competitors. Later that year, he also won the team bronze medal at the French Championships held in Saint-Paul-Trois-Châteaux.

He returned to the podium at the African Fencing Championships in Tunis 2018, winning two bronze medals: one in the individual event and one in the team competition with the Algerian national team.
