= Mohamed Ayoub Ferjani =

Tunisian fencer (born 1986)

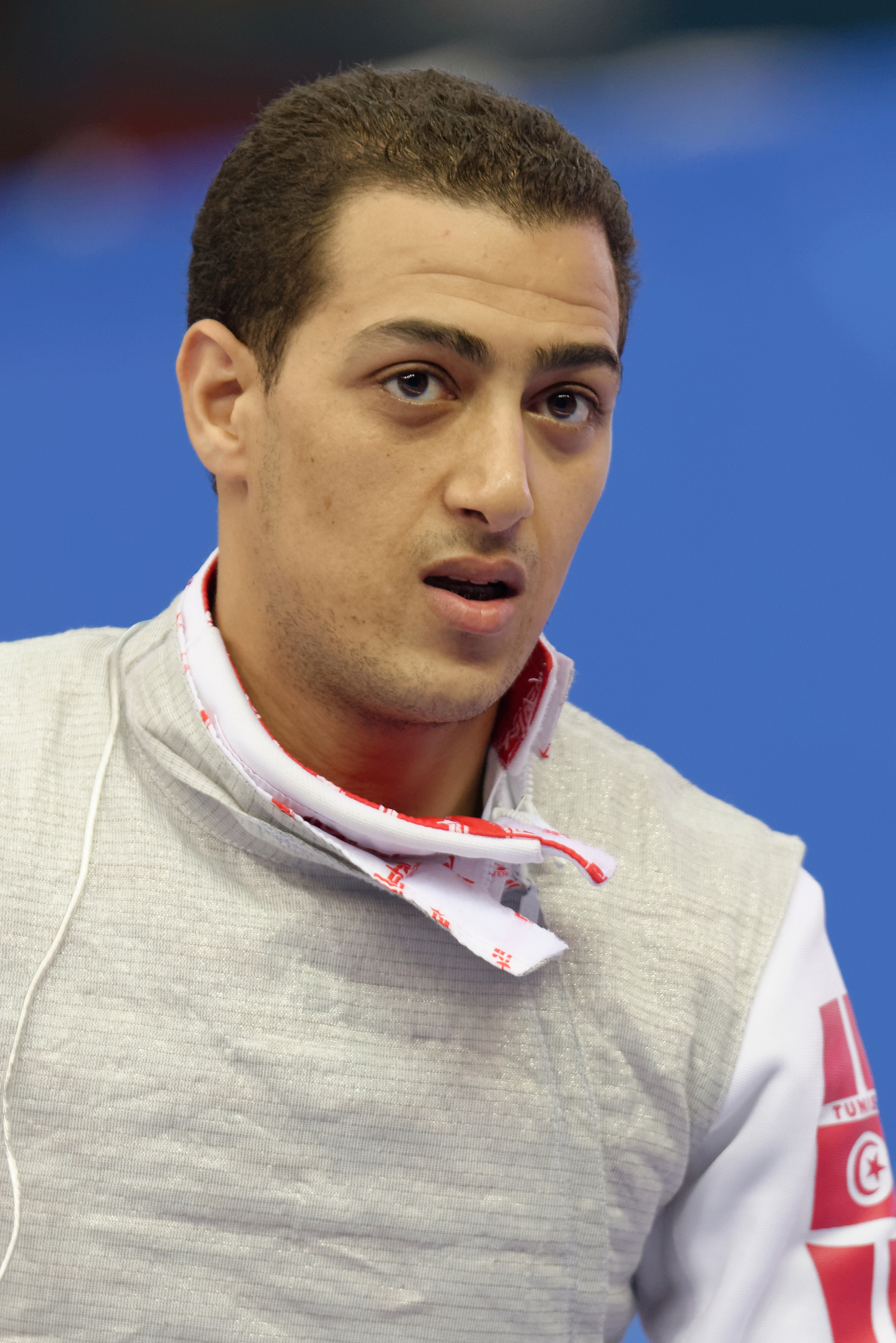

Personal information
- Nationality: Tunisian
- Born: July 27, 1986 (age 39)
- Height: 185 cm (6 ft 1 in)
- Weight: 88 kg (194 lb)

Fencing career
- Sport: Fencing
- Country: Tunisia
- Weapon: foil
- Hand: right-handed
- Years on national team: ASBR Escrime: Bourg-la-Reine
- Personal coach: Hassan Zouari
- FIE ranking: current ranking
Medal record
African Fencing Championships
Gold medal – first place	2013 Cape Town	Individual
Gold medal – first place	2015 Cairo	Individual foil
Bronze medal – third place	2007 Algiers	Individual épée
Bronze medal – third place	2007 Algiers	Individual épée
Bronze medal – third place	2008 Casablanca	Individual foil
Bronze medal – third place	2009 Dakar	Individual épée
Bronze medal – third place	2009 Dakar	Individual foil
Bronze medal – third place	2011 Cairo	Individual épée
Bronze medal – third place	2014 Cairo	Individual foil
All-Africa Games
Bronze medal – third place	2007 Algiers	Individual foil
Bronze medal – third place	2007 Algiers	Individual épée
Bronze medal – third place	2015 Brazzaville	Individual foil

Mohamed Ayoub Ferjani (born July 27, 1986) is a male foil fencer from Tunisia, African champion in 2013 and 2015. He is the elder brother of sabre fencer Fares Ferjani.

Ferjani almost never takes part in Fencing World Cup competitions, but participates in continental championships in both foil and épée. His first significant result was a double bronze medal in épée and foil at the 2007 All-Africa Games in Algiers. He stopped fencing épée in international competitions in 2012. He qualified to represent his country in men's foil at the 2016 Summer Olympics.
