= Maxine Esteban =

Filipino-Ivorian fencer (born 2000)

Personal information
- Full name: Maxine Isabel Tiu Esteban
- Born: November 26, 2000 (age 25)

Fencing career
- Sport: Fencing
- Country: Ivory Coast (since 2023)
- Former country: Philippines (until 2023)
- Training location: Italy
- Weapon: Foil
- Hand: Right-handed
- Personal coach: Andrea Magro
- Highest ranking: 27 (2022/23)
- Current ranking: 38 (2026/27)
Medal record
Representing Ivory Coast
African Championships
Silver medal – second place	2024 Casablanca	Individual foil
Bronze medal – third place	2023 Cairo	Individual foil
Representing the Philippines
Tournoi Satellite
Silver medal – second place	2022 Tashkent	Individual foil
Bronze medal – third place	2018 Copenhagen	Individual foil
FIE Junior World Cup
Bronze medal – third place	2018 Guatemala City	Individual foil
U23 European Circuit
Bronze medal – third place	2022 Brno	Individual foil
Gold medal – first place	2023 Halle	Individual foil
Southeast Asian Games
Silver medal – second place	2021 Vietnam	Team foil
Bronze medal – third place	2019 Philippines	Team foil
Bronze medal – third place	2017 Malaysia	Individual foil

Maxine Isabel Tiu Esteban (born November 26, 2000) is a Filipino-Ivorian fencer. Born in the Philippines and representing Ivory Coast internationally since 2022, she is the 2024 African silver medalist and a 2023 African bronze medalist in women's foil.

Esteban represented the Philippines before transferring to the Ivory Coast as a naturalized citizen in 2022. During her tenure under the Philippine flag, she became a 2019 Junior World Cup bronze medalist, 2x Senior Satellite world cup medalist, 2017 Southeast Asian foil bronze medalist, as well as a 2019 and 2021 team foil silver medalist. She was also the country's highest-ranked fencer at 52nd in the world.

At present, Esteban is globally ranked 38th, per the Fédération Internationale d'Escrime.

== Education ==
Esteban studied at the Immaculate Conception Academy in Greenhills, San Juan, Metro Manila for high school, graduating in 2018. She pursued a course in management engineering at the Ateneo de Manila University. She later attended the University of Pennsylvania, where she graduated with an undergraduate degree in Applied Arts and Science major in Leadership and Communications, achieving summa cum laude honors in 2023.

== Career ==
=== Early years ===
As a child, Esteban initially pursued an interest in figure skating at the ice skating rink in SM Megamall, located in Mandaluyong, Metro Manila. However, due to the rink's closure and a lack of nearby alternatives, she dropped the sport and instead convinced her parents to allow her to enter a fencing club at Xavier School.

Esteban then began her fencing career at age 12 by competing in local competitions.

=== Collegiate ===
Esteban competed for the Ateneo Blue Eagles fencing team at the University Athletic Association of the Philippines (UAAP). She was named Rookie of the Year and Most Valuable Player for Season 81 in 2018. After dominating her matches with three gold medals, Esteban led the Ateneo Women's Fencing team to win the UAAP Season 81 overall championships breaking the 11-year reign of the University of the East. In the following year, she was conferred the Moro Lorenzo Award for Excellence in Sports, as well as the Lady Eagle of the Year Awardee by her own university.

Esteban last competed for the Ateneo in February 2020, where she defended her title in the women's foil individual event. The university ultimately placed third in the UAAP Season 82 fencing tournament.

Due to the COVID-19 pandemic, all sporting events for Season 83 were cancelled.

=== National team ===
==== Philippines ====
Esteban competed in women's foil and represented the Philippines until 2022. She was ranked 16th at the peak of her junior career and 62nd in the senior category, the highest ever for a Filipino fencer.

At the 2018 FIE Junior World Cup in Guatemala City, she won a bronze medal.

Esteban also competed at the Southeast Asian Games, having won a bronze medal in the 2017 edition for the Philippines in foil. She also clinched a bronze and silver in the team foil event with teammates in the 2019 and 2021 editions respectively.

She aspires to qualify for the Olympics. Her family tapped the service of Italian coach Andrea Magro in 2020 to aid her training.

Esteban became the first Filipino to win a medal in a FIE satellite event when she finished as a bronze medalist at the 2021 FIE Tournoi Satellite in Copenhagen, Denmark. She also won the silver medal in the FIE satellite event in Tashkent, Uzbekistan. She took part in the 2022 World Seniors Cup in Serbia where she finished 38th in foil. She also took part in the World Seniors Cup in Tauberbiscofsheim Germany where she finished 44th in foil. At the Asian Fencing Championship, she finished 11th in foil, the highest among the all Philippine delegation competitors.

===== Injury and federation issues =====
Esteban competed at the 2022 World Fencing Championships in July but suffered an ACL and PCL injury. Although she was reported to have recovered by the beginning of 2023, the injury rendered her unable to participate in qualifiers for both international and national events, costing her a place in the Philippine national team. This led to Esteban switching sporting nationality for reasons that would be publicly disclosed after the move was complete; she later revealed her frustrations with her removal from the national team despite having been issued an approved written excuse letter that permitted her to skip training and local qualifiers while recovering from surgery. Because she was removed from the national team without notice, on the pretext of not participating in the qualifiers, Esteban subsequently alleged double standards with other Filipino fencers who have skipped the qualifiers and still retained their respective spots.

In April 2024, the Philippine Fencing Association released a statement, reasoning that it was obliged to send only Samantha Catantan to the qualifiers out of merit (results since 2017) and noted the waiver it had given to Esteban for her sporting nationality change. In response, Esteban insisted that she was unjustly removed from the national team but expressed sadness that her former teammate's name was dragged into the controversy.

==== Côte d'Ivoire ====
Esteban was given Ivorian citizenship through naturalization. In May 2023, she switched her sporting nationality to represent Ivory Coast internationally. The move was approved by the Philippine Fencing Association, which waived the three-year waiting period requirement, allowing her to compete for the African nation immediately. Her move was supported by the Philippine Olympic Committee.

Esteban's first podium finish for Ivory Coast was at the 2023 African Fencing Championships in Cairo, Egypt, where she clinched a bronze medal in foil. After collecting enough points from Olympic qualifier competitions, she qualified for the 2024 Summer Olympics in Paris for her new country.

In the lead-up to the Olympics, Estaban won a silver medal in the 2024 African Championships.

At the 2024 Olympics, Esteban lost to Pauline Ranvier in the Round of 32.

== Personal life ==
Esteban is a Filipino of Chinese descent. She also plays the violin and paints as hobbies outside of fencing.

Prior to her sporting nationality change, she had already been holding clinics for fencers in Cote d’Ivoire, and her family has long-standing ties with the country. Her sister Mia is also an athlete who focuses on pickleball.

== Medal record ==
=== National team ===
==== For the Philippines ====
===== FIE Tournoi Satellite =====
Year	Location	Event	Position
2021	Tashkent, Uzbekistan	Individual Women's Foil	2nd

===== FIE Junior World Cup =====
Year	Location	Event	Position
2018	Guatemala City, Guatemala	Individual Women's Foil	3rd

===== Southeast Asian Games =====
Year	Location	Event	Position
2017	Kuala Lumpur, Malaysia	Individual Women's Foil	3rd
2019	Pasay, Philippines	Team Women's Foil	2nd
2021	Hanoi, Vietnam	Team Women's Foil	2nd

==== For Ivory Coast ====
===== African Fencing Championship =====
Year	Location	Event	Position
2023	Cairo, Egypt	Individual Women's Foil	3rd
2024	Casablanca, Morocco	Individual Women's Foil	2nd

=== College ===
==== UAAP Championship ====
All results have been for the Ateneo Blue Eagles.

Year	Season	Event	Position
2018–19	Season 81	Individual Women's Foil	1st
2018–19	Season 81	Individual Women's Sabre	1st
2018–19	Season 81	Team Women's Foil	1st
2019–20	Season 82	Individual Women's Foil	1st
