= Jérémy Keryhuel =

Ivorian fencer (born 1994)

Jérémy Fafa Keryhuel
Personal information
- Born: 28 October 1994 (age 31) Paris

Fencing career
- Sport: Fencing
- Country: Ivorian
- Weapon: Foil
- Hand: Left-handed
- Club: US Pecq

Jérémy Fafa Keryhuel (born 28 October 1994) is an Ivorian fencer specializing in foil.

== Career ==
Jérémy Fafa Keryhuel held dual French-Ivorian nationality, being born to a French father and an Ivorian mother. He trained at US Pecq since 2000 and joined the Ivorian national team in 2017.

In 2024, Keryhuel won the Olympic qualification tournament in Algiers, becoming the first male Ivorian fencer to qualify for the Olympic Games. That same year, he won a bronze medal in individual foil at the 2024 African Fencing Championships in Casablanca.

== Medal record ==
Year	Location	Event	Position
2017	(Egypt) 2017 African Championships (Cairo)	Individual Men's Foil	3nd
2024	2024 African Championships (Casablanca)	Team Men's Foil	3rd
