= Foil =

Foil may refer to:

== Materials ==
- Foil (metal), a quite thin sheet of metal, usually manufactured with a rolling mill machine
- Metal leaf, a very thin sheet of decorative metal
- Aluminium foil, a type of wrapping for food
- Tin foil, metal foil made of tin, the direct predecessor to aluminium foil
- Transparency (projection), a thin sheet of transparent flexible material, placed on an overhead projector for display to an audience

== Fluid dynamics ==
- Foil (fluid mechanics)
  - Airfoil, a foil operating in air
  - Hydrofoil, a foil operating in water
  - Parafoil, a non-rigid airfoil, inflated during use
- Foil bearing, a type of fluid bearing

== Arts and culture ==
- Foil (architecture), decorative device derived from cusps of circles
- Foil stamping, a printmaking technique
- Foil (fencing), one of the three weapons used in modern fencing
- Foil (fiction), a subsidiary character who emphasizes the traits of a main character
  - Comedic or comic foil, the straight man in a comedy double act
- Foil (narrative), a character who contrasts with another character of a narrative work
- "Foil" (song), "Weird Al" Yankovic's parody of Lorde's song "Royals"
- Foil (film), a 2023 sci-fi comedy film

== Navigation ==
- Hydrofoil, a type of high-powered motorboat that uses underwater foils to lift its hull above the water when moving at high speeds
- Bruce foil, a foil used on an outrigger to prevent a boat from heeling
- Centreboard, a movable keel that functions as a foil
- Foilboard, a surfboard using a hydrofoil

== Other uses ==
- People in a police lineup
- First-order inductive learner – a rule-based learning algorithm
- The FOIL method, a mnemonic in algebra, to expand the product of two first-degree polynomials ("linear factors")
- FOIL (programming language), either of two now-defunct computer programming languages
- Forum of Indian Leftists, a political group of Indian intellectuals
- Freedom of information legislation or Freedom of Information Law (FOIL)
- Ultrasonic foil (papermaking), a type of high-frequency vibrating foil involved in papermaking
- Split tally, in ancient financial accounting, the part of a split tally stick given to the recipient in a transaction
