= Sarra Guezguez =

Tunisian sailor (born 2005)

Personal information
- Nationality: Tunisian
- Born: 12 March 2005 (age 20); M'saken, Tunisia
- Relative: Eya Guezguez (twin sister)

Sport
- Sport: Sailing

Sarra Guezguez (born 12 March 2005) is a Tunisian sailor. She competed in the 49er FX event at the 2020 Summer Olympics, along with her twin sister Eya. Eya died on 10 April 2022 after they were involved in a boat accident.
