= Saoussen Boudiaf =

Algerian sabre fencer (born 1993)

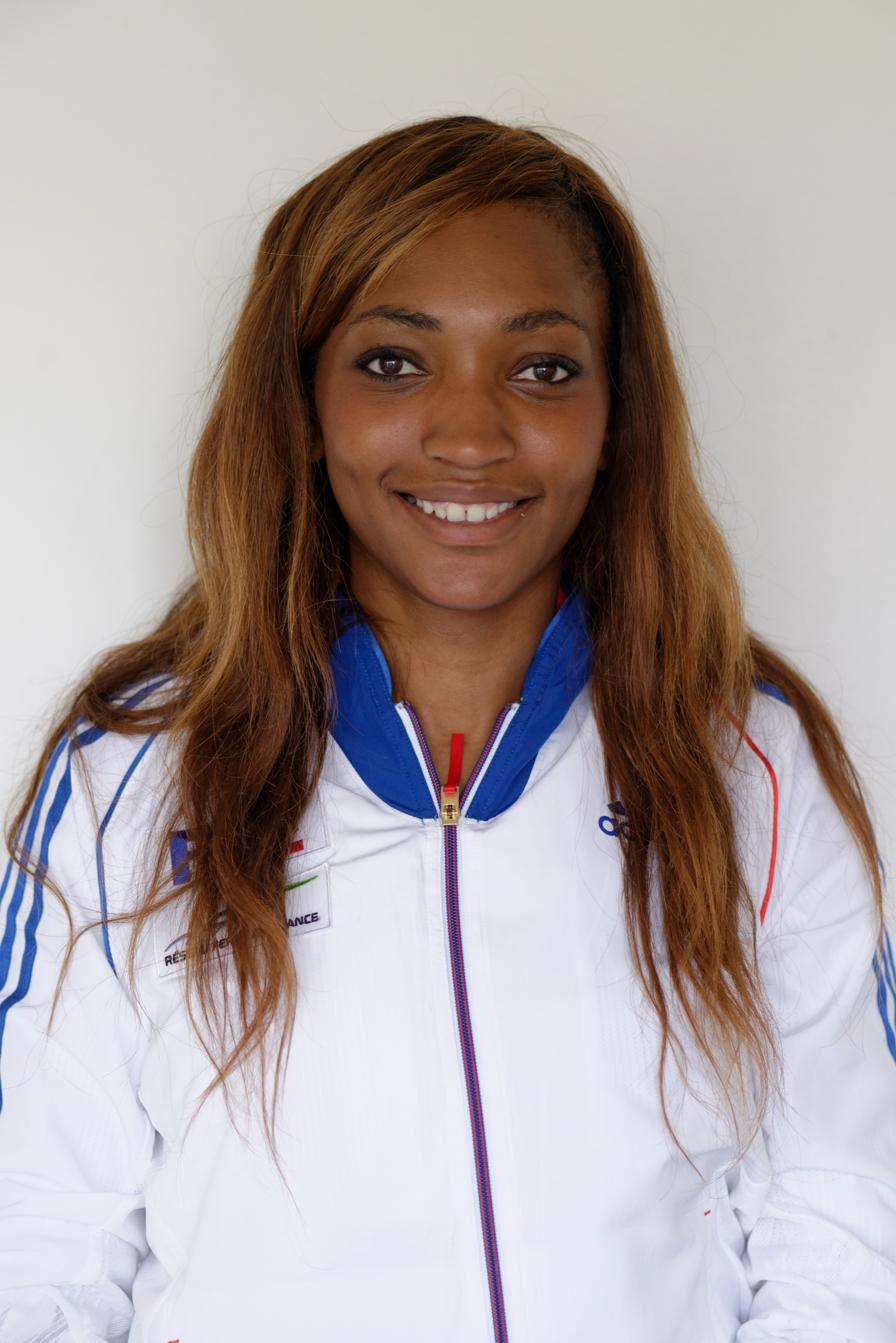
- Boudiaf in 2013

Personal information
- Native name: سوسن بوضياف
- Full name: Saoussen Dlindah Hilane Boudiaf
- Nationality: French, Algerian
- Born: 31 December 1993 (age 32) Roubaix, France
- Height: 1.73 m (5 ft 8 in)
- Weight: 69 kg (152 lb)

Fencing career
- Sport: Fencing
- Country: France (2013-2019); Algeria (2021-present)
- Weapon: sabre
- Hand: right-handed
- FIE ranking: current ranking
Medal record
Women's sabre
Representing France
World Championships
Silver medal – second place	2013 Kazan	Team
European Championships
Silver medal – second place	2014 Strasbourg	Team
Silver medal – second place	2015 Montreux	Team
Silver medal – second place	2016 Toruń	Team
Representing Algeria
African Championships
Gold medal – first place	2022 Casablanca	Team
Bronze medal – third place	2022 Casablanca	Individual
Mediterranean Games
Gold medal – first place	2022 Oran	Individual

Saoussen Dlindah Hilane Boudiaf (Arabic: سوسن دليندة هلان بوضياف; born 31 December 1993) is a sabre fencer. Born in France, she represents Algeria internationally and competed for France in the past. She won the gold medal in the women's individual sabre event at the 2022 Mediterranean Games held in Oran, Algeria.

== Early life ==
Boudiaf was born in France to an Ivorian father and Algerian mother. She never met her father, her mother died when Boudiaf was six, and she was raised by her aunt and grandmother. At the age of 11, her aunt encouraged her to practice a sport and she picked up fencing at a local club.

== Personal life ==
Boudiaf is Muslim.
