= Eya Guezguez =

Tunisian sailor (2005–2022)

Personal information
- Nationality: Tunisian
- Born: 12 March 2005; M'saken, Tunisia
- Died: 10 April 2022 (aged 17); Mediterranean Sea, near Tunis, Tunisia
- Relative(s): Sarra Guezguez (twin sister)

Sport
- Sport: Sailing

Achievements and titles
- Olympic finals: 2020

Eya Guezguez (12 March 2005 – 10 April 2022) was a Tunisian sailor. She competed in the 49er FX event at the 2020 Summer Olympics.

== Career ==
Eya Guezguez competed in the 49er FX event at the 2020 Summer Olympics, along with her twin sister Sarra. Eya was the youngest Tunisian at the Games, as Sarra was two minutes older than Eya, and Eya was the team's skipper. The pair finished 21st and last in the event, and did not compete in the final three races of the event.

== Death ==
On 10 April 2022, Guezguez drowned whilst training, at the age of 17. She had been training with her sister when their boat capsized in the waters near Tunis, due to high winds. An investigation into her death has been launched.
