= Evann Girault =

French-Nigerien sabre fencer (born 2004)

Personal information
- Born: 25 August 2004 (age 21) Orléans, France

Fencing career
- Sport: Fencing
- Country: Niger
- Weapon: Sabre
- Hand: right-handed
- Club: Cercle d'Escrime Orléanais

Evann Jean Abba Girault (born 25 August 2004) is a French-Nigerien sabre fencer. He qualified to represent Niger at the 2024 Summer Olympics.

== Biography ==
Girault was born on 25 August 2004 in Orléans, France, to a French father and Nigerien mother. He holds dual citizenship. He grew up in Orléans and competed in gymnastics as a youth for seven or eight years. His brother was a fencer, and after watching him participate at various events, he decided to try out the sport himself. He joined the fencing club Cercle d'Escrime Orléanais in 2015.

Girault competes in sabre fencing events and is right-handed. In addition to competing at tournaments in France, he started competing internationally in 2021, choosing to represent Niger. He was ranked 119th globally in the junior rankings for the 2021–22 season and competed at several events with his brother. He placed 8th at the African Senior Championships in 2022 and then won silver at the African Junior Championships in 2023, while being 5th at the World Junior Championships. He was ranked 13th by the FIE globally for juniors for the 2022–23 season and ranked 43rd in the seniors category for that year.

Girault studies at the University of Orléans, where he won the French university national championship in 2023. He represented Niger at the Fencing World Cup in November 2023 and later won the silver medal at the African Cadet and Juniors Fencing Championship in March 2023. By February 2024, he was ranked 8th in the global junior rankings and 41st in the senior rankings. He participated at the African Olympic qualifying tournament in April 2024 and defeated Algerian Zacharia Bounachada in the final by a score of 15–10, securing a spot at the 2024 Summer Olympics representing Niger. He became the first Nigerien to qualify for the Olympics in fencing.
