= Medhat Moataz =

Egyptian fencer

Personal information
- Nationality: Egyptian
- Born: 23 October 2000 (age 25)

Sport
- Sport: Fencing
Medal record
Men's sabre
Representing Egypt
African Championships
| Silver medal – second place | 2024 Casablanca | team |

Medhat Moataz (born 23 October 2000) is an Egyptian fencer. He competed in the men's team sabre event at the 2020 Summer Olympics.
