= Olfa Hezami =

Tunisian fencer (born 2000)

Personal information
- Nationality: Tunisian
- Born: 22 November 2000 (age 25)

Sport
- Sport: Fencing
Medal record
African Fencing Championships
Gold medal – first place	2018 Tunis	Team sabre

Olfa Hezami (born 22 November 2000) is a Tunisian fencer. She competed in the women's team sabre event at the 2020 Summer Olympics.
