= Akram Bounabi =

Algerian fencer

Personal information
- Nationality: Algerian
- Born: 28 August 1999 (age 27)

Sport
- Country: Algeria
- Sport: Fencing
Medal record
Men's sabre
Representing Algeria
African Championships
Bronze medal – third place	2023 Cairo	team

Akram Bounabi (born 28 August 1999) is an Algerian fencer. He competed in the 2020 Summer Olympics in the Men's Sabre Individual event. He finished in 35th place after losing to Kaito Streets of Japan in the Round of 64.
