= Houssam El Kord =

Moroccan fencer (born 1993)

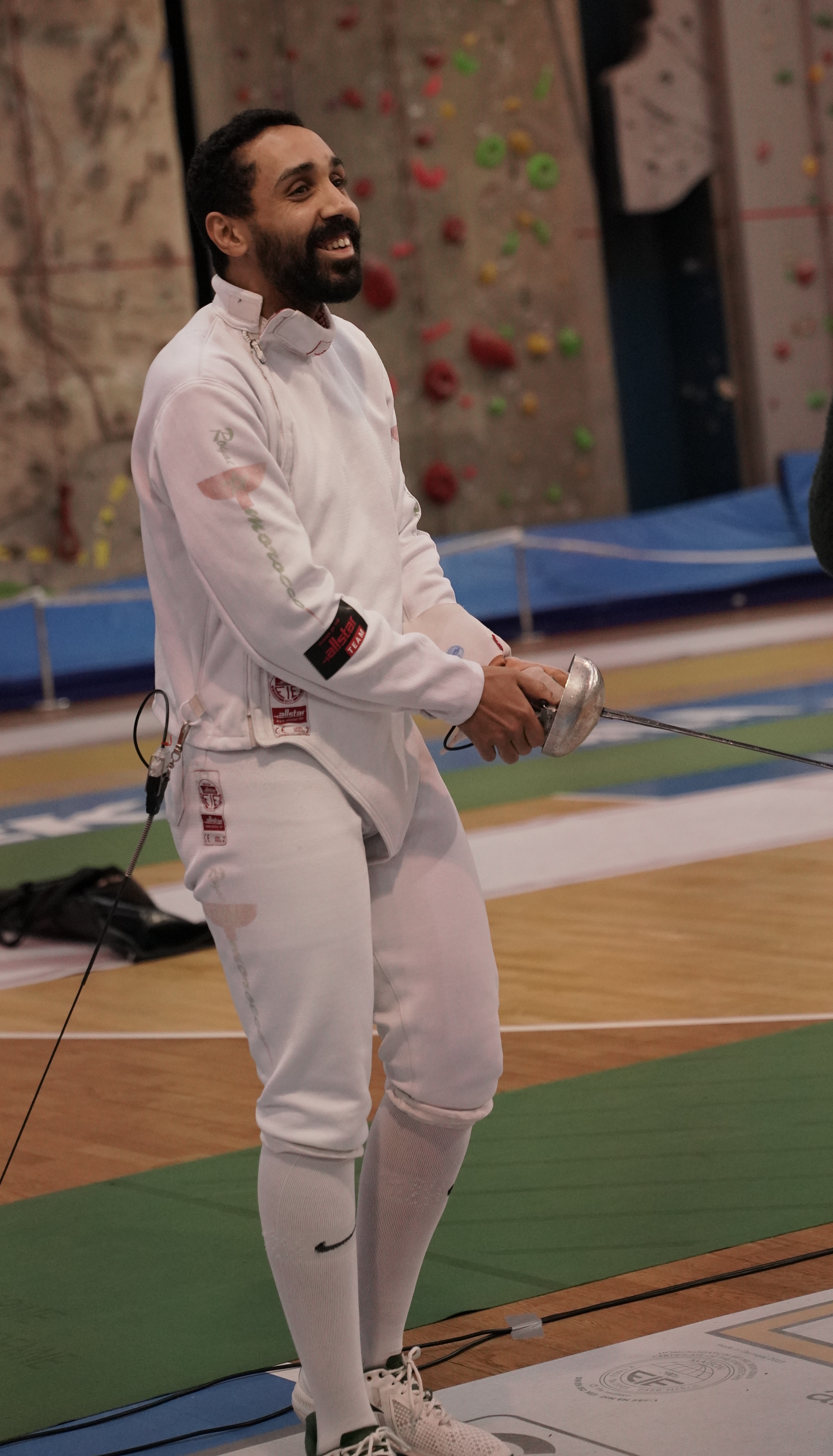

Personal information
- Nationality: Moroccan
- Born: 24 February 1993 (age 33)

Sport
- Country: Morocco
- Sport: Fencing
- Event: épée
- Club: Levallois SC
Medal record
Men's fencing
Representing Morocco
African Games
Gold medal – first place	2019 Sale	individual épée
Silver medal – second place	2019 Sale	team épée
African Championships
Gold medal – first place	2018 Tunis	individual épée
Silver medal – second place	2024 Casablanca	individual épée
Silver medal – second place	2026 Abidjan	individual épée
Mediterranean Games
Bronze medal – third place	2018 Tarragona	Individual

Houssam El Kord (also spelled El-Kord, born 24 February 1993) is a Moroccan fencer. His sister Camélia El Kord is also a fencer who has represented Morocco at international level. He currently lives in France and also serves as a freelance chiropodist in Paris.

== Career ==
El Kord obtained his bachelor's degree in life sciences from the Pierre and Marie Curie University in 2013. He was influenced by his elder sister Camélia El Kord to take up the sport of fencing.

He claimed a gold medal in the men's individual épée at the 2019 African Games. He represented Morocco at the 2020 Summer Olympics which also marked his debut appearance at the Olympics. During the 2020 Summer Olympics, he competed in the men's épée event.
