= Mohamed Hamza =

Egyptian fencer (born 2000)

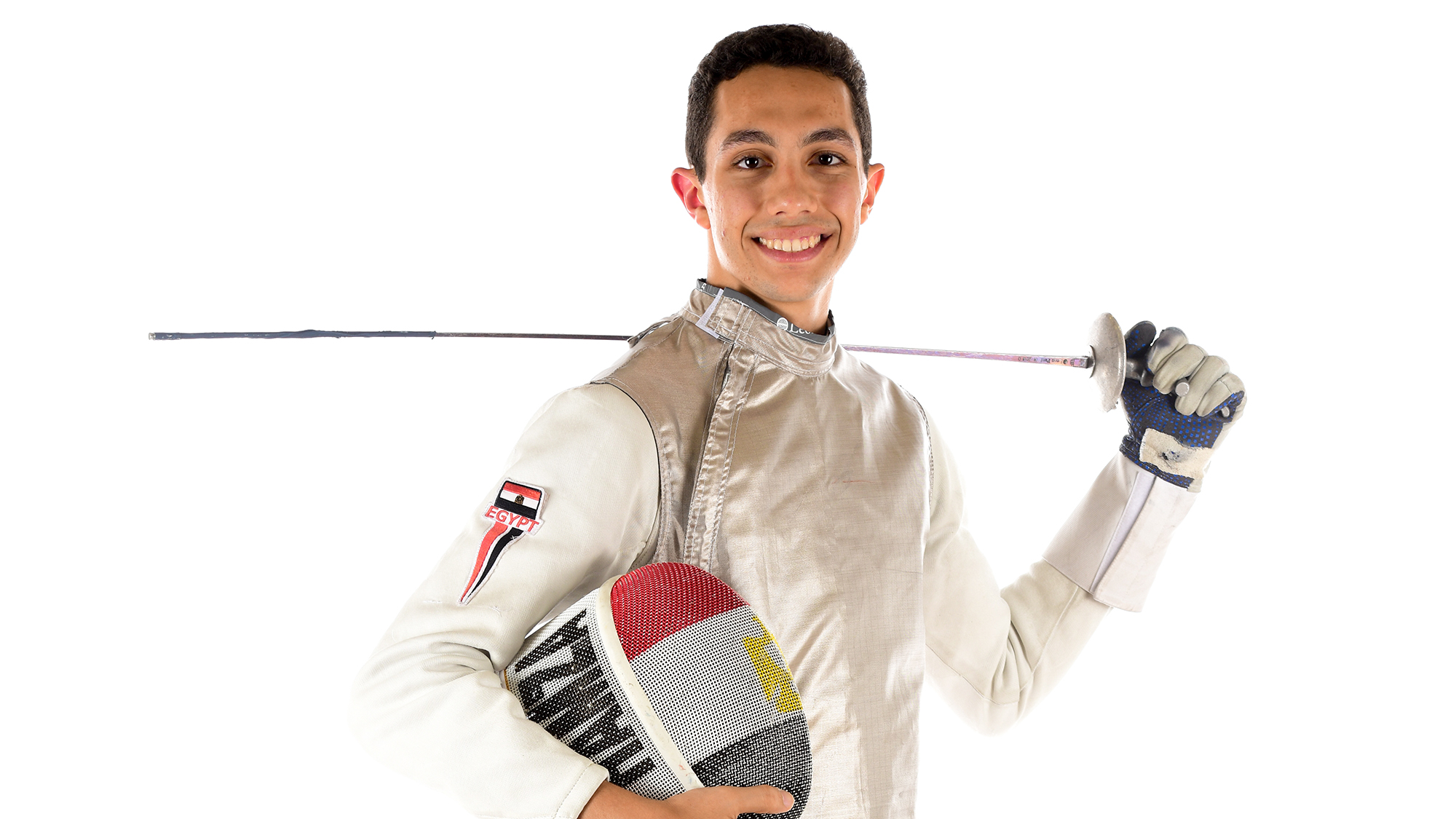

Personal information
- Born: 11 September 2000 (age 26) Houston, Texas, U.S.
- Height: 1.82 m (6 ft 0 in)
- Weight: 77 kg (170 lb)

Sport
- Country: Egypt
- Sport: Fencing
- Event: Foil
- Coached by: Mauro Hamza
Medal record
Men's Foil
Representing Egypt
Mediterranean Games
Gold medal – first place	2026 Taranto	Individual
Bronze medal – third place	2022 Oran	Individual
NCAA Fencing Championships
Bronze medal – third place	2022 Notre Dame University	Individual
Silver medal – second place	2023 Duke University	Individual
Senior World Cup
Gold medal – first place	2023 Acapulco, Mexico	Individual
Silver medal – second place	2023 Tokoname, Japan	Individual
Bronze medal – third place	2024 Tunis, Tunisia	Individual
Senior Grand Prix
Bronze medal – third place	2024 Shanghai, China	Individual
Junior World Cup
Gold medal – first place	2020 Aix-en-Provence	Individual
Junior World Championships
Bronze medal – third place	2019 Toruń	Individual
Junior African Championships
Gold medal – first place	2017 Ivory Coast
Gold medal – first place	2018 Nigeria
Gold medal – first place	2019 Algeria
Gold medal – first place	2020 Ghana	Individual
Senior African Championships
Gold medal – first place	2023 Cairo	Individual
Gold medal – first place	2024 Casablanca	Individual
Gold medal – first place	2024 Casablanca	Team foil
Silver medal – second place	2019 Bamako	Individual
Gold medal – first place	2019 Bamako	Team
Silver medal – second place	2022 Casablanca	Individual
Gold medal – first place	2022 Lagos	Team
Gold medal – first place	2025 Lagos	Individual
African Games
Bronze medal – third place	2019 Rabat	Individual
Gold medal – first place	2019 Rabat	Team

Mohamed Hamza (born 11 September 2000) is an Egyptian foil fencer who graduated from Princeton University. He competed for Egypt in the men's team foil event at the 2016 Summer Olympics as well as the men's foil individual and team events at the 2020 Summer Olympics and 2024 Summer Olympics.

== Career ==
He attended the Awty International School in Houston, Texas.

He won one of the bronze medals in the men's individual foil event at the 2022 Mediterranean Games held in Oran, Algeria.

In 2023, he won a gold medal in foil at both the African Fencing Championships, and Acapulco World Cup, and a silver medal in the NCAA Foil Fencing Championships.

He is coached by his father, Mauro Hamza.
