= Noha Hany =

Egyptian fencer (born 2001)

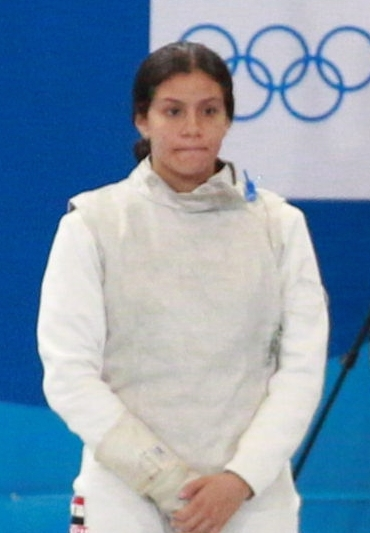
- 2018 Summer Youth Olympics – Girls' foil Quarterfinals

Personal information
- Nationality: Egyptian
- Born: 25 February 2001 (age 25)

Sport
- Sport: Fencing
Medal record
Representing Egypt
African Championships
Gold medal – first place	2024 Casablanca	Team foil
Bronze medal – third place	2024 Casablanca	Individual foil

Noha Hany (born 25 February 2001) is an Egyptian fencer. She competed in the women's foil event at the 2020 Summer Olympics.

She competed at the 2018 African Fencing Championships, and the 2019 African Fencing Championships.
