= Yara El-Sharkawy =

Egyptian fencer

Personal information
- Nationality: Egyptian
- Born: 11 April 1999 (age 27)

Sport
- Sport: Fencing
Medal record
Representing Egypt
African Championships
| Gold medal – first place | 2024 Casablanca | Individual foil |
| Gold medal – first place | 2024 Casablanca | Team foil |

Yara El-Sharkawy (born 11 April 1999) is an Egyptian fencer. She competed in the women's foil event at the 2020 Summer Olympics.

She competed at the 2015 African Fencing Championships, 2017 African Fencing Championships, 2018 African Fencing Championships, and 2019 African Fencing Championships.
