= Farès Ferjani =

Tunisian Olympic fencer (born 1997)

Personal information
- Born: 22 July 1997 (age 29) Tunis, Tunisia
- Height: 5 ft 11 in (180 cm)
- Weight: 172 lb (78 kg)

Fencing career
- University team: St. John’s University
- Sport: Fencing
- Country: Tunisia
- Weapon: Sabre
- Hand: Right-handed
- Club: Manhattan Fencing Center
- Head coach: Yury Gelman
Medal record
Fencing
Representing Tunisia
Olympic Games
Silver medal – second place	2024 Paris	Men’s Individual Sabre
African Games
Gold medal – first place	2015 Brazzaville	Individual Sabre
Gold medal – first place	2019 Rabat	Individual Sabre
Mediterranean Games
Bronze medal – third place	2026 Taranto	Individual Sabre
Islamic Solidarity Games
Gold medal – first place	2025 Riyadh	individual sabre
Bronze medal – third place	2025 Riyadh	team sabre
African Championships
Gold medal – first place	2017 Cairo	Individual Sabre
Gold medal – first place	2018 Tunis	Individual Sabre
Gold medal – first place	2022 Casablanca	Individual Sabre
Gold medal – first place	2023 Cairo	Team Sabre
Gold medal – first place	2024 Casablanca	team
Arab Games
Gold medal – first place	2024 Algiers	Individual Sabre

Farès Ferjani (born 22 July 1997) is a Tunisian sabre fencer and Olympic silver medalist. Known for his explosive athleticism and tactical precision, he represents Tunisia in international competition and is regarded as one of the most accomplished African fencers in history. Ferjani won the silver medal in the men’s individual sabre at the Paris 2024 Olympics, becoming the first Tunisian fencer to reach an Olympic final.

A multiple African champion and African Games gold medalist, Ferjani has earned numerous continental titles and remains one of Africa’s most decorated fencers. He fenced collegiately for St. John’s University in New York, where he was named an All-American.

== Personal life ==
Farès Ferjani was born and raised in Tunisia and later moved to the United States, where he attended St. John’s University in New York and earned a Master of Business Administration (MBA). He maintains ties to both Tunisia and the United States.

Outside fencing, Ferjani has an interest in travel, photography, and fashion. He is also known for his close relationship with his family and has spoken publicly about the importance of maintaining a positive outlook and continuing to develop both personally and professionally alongside his athletic career.

He continues to train at the Manhattan Fencing Center under renowned coach Yury Gelman.

== Fencing career ==
He competed in the men's sabre event at the 2016 Summer Olympics, finishing in 25th place.

After the 2016 Olympic Games he moved to New York City after speaking with coach Yury Gelman. He said: "it was a big difference. The practice was different. These guys do a lot of footwork. Everything counts, each detail counts. I think for me, it's just great that I moved there because I've jumped to another level."

He attended and competed for St. John’s University in Queens in New York City, training with coach Yury Gelman. In 2017-18 he was a second team All-American for the school, and in 2018–19, 2021–22, and 2022–23 he was a first team All-American.

He qualified to represent Tunisia at the 2020 Summer Olympics, where he came in 22nd.

2022–2023 interruption and return:

During the 2022–2023 season, Ferjani was unable to compete internationally for an extended period while awaiting approval of his U.S. permanent residency (Green Card). The interruption prevented him from maintaining a normal international competition schedule during an important period of his career.

After receiving his permanent residency, Ferjani returned to international competition in 2023 and resumed his qualification campaign for the 2024 Summer Olympics. Despite having missed an entire competitive season, he returned to competition in time to accumulate the results required to qualify for the Olympic Games.

His return culminated in qualification for the men’s individual sabre event at the 2024 Summer Olympics in Paris. Ferjani subsequently reached the final of the individual competition and won the silver medal at 2024 Summer Olympics in the men's sabre individual event, with Gelman coaching him from the sidelines.

== Decoration ==
- First Class of the National Order of Merit (Tunisia, 16 August 2024)

== Medal record ==
=== Olympic Games ===
Year	Location	Event	Position
2024	Paris, France	Individual Men's Sabre	2nd
