= Mohamed Hassan (fencer) =

Egyptian fencer

Personal information
- Nationality: Egyptian
- Born: 1 July 1997 (age 27); Tabuk, Saudi Arabia

Sport
- Sport: Fencing

Mohamed Hassan (Arabic: محمد حسين; born 1 July 1997) is an Egyptian fencer. He competed in the men's team foil event at the 2020 Summer Olympics.
