= Harry Saner =

South African fencer

Harry Saner (born 18 September 2000) is a South African fencer. Saner represented South Africa at the 2024 Summer Olympics, becoming the first South African fencer to qualify for the Olympics since 2008. Saner qualified for the Olympics by winning the African qualifying tournament in Algiers. Competing in the men's épée, he lost his first bout against Vadim Sharlaimov. Saner became interested in fencing as a child due to his interest in medieval knights and wanting to emulate them.
