= Ziad El-Sissy =

Egyptian fencer (born 1994)

Ziad A. El-Sissy
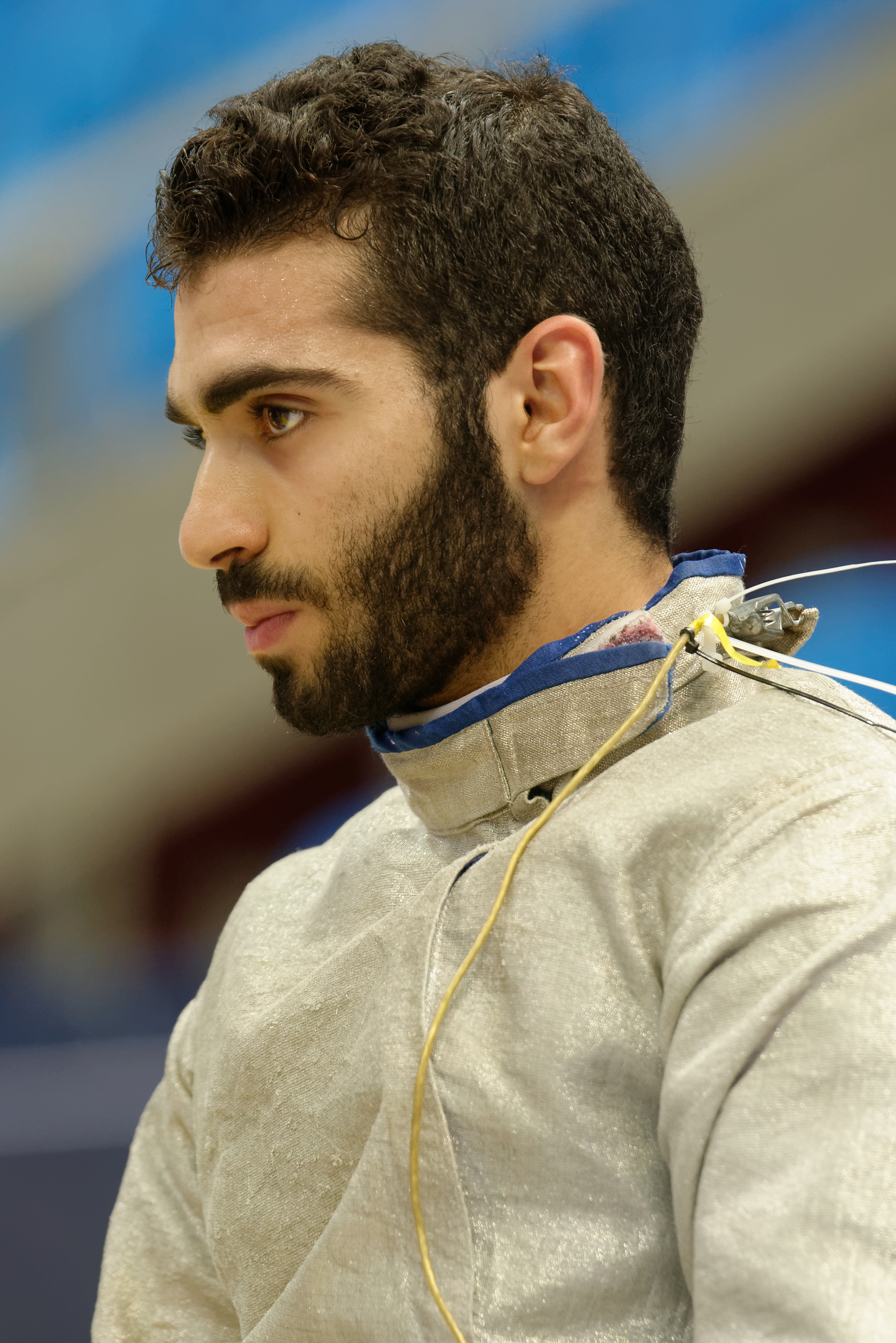
- El-Sissy in 2015

Personal information
- Born: 15 December 1994 (age 31) Alexandria, Egypt
- Height: 1.82 m (6 ft 0 in)
- Weight: 161 lb (73 kg)

Fencing career
- Sport: Fencing
- Country: Egypt
- Weapon: Sabre
- Hand: right-handed
- Club: Z1 Fencing Club
- FIE ranking: 2
Medal record
Men's sabre
Representing Egypt
World Championships
Bronze medal – third place	2023 Milan	Individual
African Championships
Gold medal – first place	2026 Abidjan	Team
Silver medal – second place	2024 Casablanca	Team
Silver medal – second place	2026 Abidjan	individual
Bronze medal – third place	2024 Casablanca	individual
Mediterranean Games
Gold medal – first place	2022 Oran	Individual

Ziad El-Sissy (born 15 December 1994) is an Egyptian fencer. He won the gold medal in the men's individual sabre event at the 2022 Mediterranean Games held in Oran, Algeria. He represented Egypt at the 2020 Summer Olympics in Tokyo, Japan.

== Career ==
Ziad El-Sissy was born in Alexandria, Egypt to parents Aly and Manal El-Sissy. His father was a member of the Egypt men's national basketball team. He attended college at Wayne State University and ended his overall collegiate career with a 332–63 record, the most wins in program history.

He competed at the 2020 Summer Olympics in Tokyo. El-Sissy got 14th place in Individual Men's Sabre and Egypt got 6th in Team Men's Sabre.

He went on to compete at the 2024 Summer Olympics where he got 4th place in Individual Men's Sabre.

El-Sissy is married to squash player Nouran Gohar.
