= Nada Hafez =

Egyptian sabre fencer (born 1997)

Personal information
- Born: 28 August 1997 (age 29) Cairo
- Height: 1.68 m (5 ft 6 in)
- Weight: 58 kg (128 lb)

Fencing career
- Sport: Fencing
- Country: Egypt
- Weapon: sabre
- Hand: Right-handed
- Head coach: Mahmoud Gindyia
- FIE ranking: current ranking
Medal record
Representing Egypt
African Championships
Gold medal – first place	2024 Casablanca	Team
Bronze medal – third place	2024 Casablanca	Individual

Nada Hafez (born 28 August 1997) is an Egyptian sabre fencer. She competed at the 2016 Summer Olympics, 2020 Summer Olympics and 2024 Summer Olympics in Sabre.

== Career ==
In 2014, she became a member of the Egyptian National Senior Fencing Sabre Women's Team. In 2015, she won her first Egyptian Senior Women's Sabre National Republic Competition.

In 2016, she qualified through the African zonal qualification (Algeria) to the 2016 Summer Rio Olympics and in 2021, she qualified for the Summer Tokyo Olympics. Hafez won one silver (2018) and two bronze (2019, 2014) at the African zonal championship. She also won the bronze medal at the Belgium Tournoi satellite.

She competed at the 2024 Olympic Games in Paris while seven months pregnant. She beat American Elizabeth Tartakovsky 15–13 before losing 15–7 to South Korean Jeon Ha-young.

== Personal life ==
Hafez is an Egyptian national champion in gymnastics. She attended Cairo University where she earned a degree in medicine in 2022, going on to work as a clinical pathologist.

On March 2, 2023, Hafez married cardiothoracic surgeon Ibrahim Ihab. While competing at the 2024 Olympic Games, it was revealed that Hafez was 7 months pregnant with their first child. Hafez gave birth to said child, daughter Zeina Ibrahim Osman on 14 October 2024.
