= Noura Mohamed =

Egyptian fencer

Personal information
- Born: 5 March 1998 (age 28)

Sport
- Sport: Fencing

Noura Mohamed (born 5 March 1998) is an Egyptian fencer. She competed in the women's foil event at the 2016 Summer Olympics, losing her only match. She also represented Egypt at the 2020 Summer Olympics held in Tokyo, Japan.

She competed at the 2018 African Fencing Championships, winning a bronze medal.
