= African Fencing Championships =

International fencing event

- Status: active
- Frequency: annual
- Inaugurated: 1991
- Most recent: 2026
- Organiser: African Fencing Confederation

The African Fencing Championships (French: Championnats d'Afrique d'escrime) are an annual top-level fencing tournament organized by the African Fencing Confederation. They serve as zone championships for the Fencing World Cup run by the International Fencing Federation. The first edition was held in 1991 in Cairo, Egypt

== Editions ==
Number	Edition	City	Country	Events
1	1991	Cairo	Egypt	4
2	1993	Casablanca	Morocco	4
3	1995	Pretoria	South Africa	10
4	2000	Tunis	Tunisia	4
5	2002	Dakar	Senegal	11
6	2004	Tunis	Tunisia	12
7	2006	Casablanca	Morocco	12
8	2008	Casablanca	Morocco	12
9	2009	Dakar	Senegal	12
10	2010	Tunis	Tunisia	12
11	2011	Cairo	Egypt	12
12	2012	Casablanca	Morocco	12
13	2013	Cape Town	South Africa	12
14	2014	Cairo	Egypt	12
15	2015	Cairo	Egypt	12
16	2016	Algiers	Algeria	12
17	2017	Cairo	Egypt	12
18	2018	Tunis	Tunisia	12
19	2019	Bamako	Mali	12
20	2022	Casablanca	Morocco	12
21	2023	Cairo	Egypt	12
22	2024	Casablanca	Morocco	12
23	2025	Lagos	Nigeria	12
24	2026	Abidjan	Ivory Coast	12

== Statistics 1991-2023 ==
=== Points Wins by country ===
Overall points winners
Country	First	Second	Third	Total
Egypt	15	5	0	20
Tunisia	6	10	2	18
Algeria	0	4	2	6
South Africa	0	2	1	3
Senegal	0	0	8	8
Morocco	0	0	5	5
Libya	0	0	1	1
Ivory Coast	0	0	1	1
Kenya	0	0	1	1

== All Time Medal table 1991–2024 ==
Rank	Nation	Gold	Silver	Bronze	Total
1	Egypt	118	91	127	336
2	Tunisia	94	68	58	220
3	Algeria	9	26	46	81
4	Senegal	6	11	43	60
5	Morocco	3	18	27	48
6	South Africa	2	14	20	36
7	Kenya	2	0	0	2
8	Ivory Coast	1	2	6	9
9	Cameroon	1	0	0	1
9	Libya	1	0	0	1
11	Benin	0	2	0	2
12	Mauritius	0	1	0	1
13	Niger	0	0	2	2
14	Togo	0	0	1	1
Totals (14 entries)		237	233	330	800

== See also ==
- Fencing at the Summer Olympics
- World Fencing Championships
- other zone championships: Asian Fencing Championships, European Fencing Championships, Pan American Fencing Championships
