= Fencing at the 2018 Asian Games – Women's team foil =

Women's team foil at the 2018 Asian Games
- Venue: Jakarta Convention Center
- Date: 23 August 2018
- Competitors: 39 from 10 nations

Medalists
gold medal	Japan; Sera Azuma, Komaki Kikuchi, Karin Miyawaki, Sumire Tsuji
silver medal	China; Chen Qingyuan, Fu Yiting, Huo Xingxin, Shi Yue
bronze medal	South Korea; Chae Song-oh, Hong Seo-in, Jeon Hee-sook, Nam Hyun-hee
bronze medal	Singapore; Amita Berthier, Melanie Huang, Maxine Wong, Tatiana Wong

The women's team foil competition at the 2018 Asian Games in Jakarta was held on 23 August at the Jakarta Convention Center. South Korean team was the defending champion in this event after won the last five gold medals from 1998 to 2014. Japan clinched their first gold medal in this event at the Asian Games after defeated the Chinese team with the score 35–34 in the final. China captured the silver medal, while Singapore and South Korean team won the bronze medal.

== Schedule ==
All times are Western Indonesia Time (UTC+07:00)

Date	Time	Event
Thursday, 23 August 2018	09:00	Round of 16
Thursday, 23 August 2018	10:30	Quarterfinals
Thursday, 23 August 2018	12:00	Semifinals
Thursday, 23 August 2018	18:00	Gold medal match

== Seeding ==
The teams were seeded taking into account the results achieved by competitors representing each team in the individual event.

Rank	Team	Fencer		Total
Rank	Team	1	2	Total
1	Japan (JPN)	3	6	9
2	China (CHN)	2	8	10
3	Singapore (SGP)	5	9	14
4	South Korea (KOR)	1	14	15
5	Hong Kong (HKG)	3	16	19
6	Chinese Taipei (TPE)	7	12	19
7	Philippines (PHI)	13	15	28
8	Lebanon (LBN)	10	22	32
9	Macau (MAC)	17	18	35
10	Indonesia (INA)	19	21	40

== Results ==
Round of 16
9	Macau	23
8	Lebanon	45
7	Philippines	45
10	Indonesia	19

Quarterfinals
1	Japan	45
8	Lebanon	9
5	Hong Kong	32
4	South Korea	45
3	Singapore	45
6	Chinese Taipei	19
7	Philippines	38
2	China	45

Semifinals
1	Japan	45
4	South Korea	36
3	Singapore	14
2	China	45

Gold medal match
1	Japan	35
2	China	34

== Final standing ==
Rank	Team
1st place, gold medalist(s)	Japan (JPN); Sera Azuma; Komaki Kikuchi; Karin Miyawaki; Sumire Tsuji
2nd place, silver medalist(s)	China (CHN); Chen Qingyuan; Fu Yiting; Huo Xingxin; Shi Yue
3rd place, bronze medalist(s)	South Korea (KOR); Chae Song-oh; Hong Seo-in; Jeon Hee-sook; Nam Hyun-hee
3rd place, bronze medalist(s)	Singapore (SGP); Amita Berthier; Melanie Huang; Maxine Wong; Tatiana Wong
5	Hong Kong (HKG); Cheng Hiu Lam; Kimberley Cheung; Liu Yan Wai; Sophia Wu
6	Chinese Taipei (TPE); Cheng Hsin; Lei Yu-ru; Yang Chin-man; Yu Li-chun
7	Philippines (PHI); Samantha Catantan; Maxine Esteban; Wilhelmina Lozada; Justine Gail Tinio
8	Lebanon (LBN); Rita Abou Jaoude; Nai Salameh; Mona Shaito
9	Macau (MAC); Ho Ka U Ho Peng I Huang Liya; Tang Nga Hei
10	Indonesia (INA); Nurul Aini; Mery Ananda; Voryn Thalya Kiriwenno; Leoda Lundy Winona
