= Women's foil at the 2010 World Fencing Championships =

- Venue: Grand Palais
- Location: Paris, France
- Dates: 7 November

Medalists
gold medal	Elisa Di Francisca	Italy
silver medal	Arianna Errigo	Italy
bronze medal	Valentina Vezzali	Italy
bronze medal	Nam Hyun-hee	South Korea

The Women's foil event took place on November 7, 2010 at Grand Palais.

== Draw ==
=== Finals ===
Semi-finals
(South Korea) Nam Hyun-Hee	12
(Italy) Elisa di Francisca	15
(Italy) Arianna Errigo	15
(Italy) Valentina Vezzali	10

Final
(Italy) Elisa di Francisca	15
(Italy) Arianna Errigo	11

=== Top half ===
==== Section 1 ====
Round of 64
(South Korea) Nam Hyun-Hee	15
(United Kingdom) Hannah Bryars	4
(China) Huili Dai	8
(France) Gaëlle Gebet	15
(Tunisia) Ines Boubakri	15
(Japan) Kyomi Hirata	11
(Singapore) Wang Wenying	1
(France) Virginie Ujlaky	15
(Russia) Yevgeniya Lamonova	15
(Canada) Monica Peterson	4
(China) Le Huilin	15
(Belgium) Julie Groslambert	11
(Japan) Chie Yoshizawa	15
(Romania) Maria Udrea	7
(Czech Republic) Eliska Sabartova	4
(France) Corinne Maîtrejean	15

Round of 32
(South Korea) Nam Hyun-Hee	15
(France) Gaëlle Gebet	6
(Tunisia) Ines Boubakri	15
(France) Virginie Ujlaky	6
(Russia) Yevgeniya Lamonova	15
(China) Le Huilin	12
(Japan) Chie Yoshizawa	12
(France) Corinne Maîtrejean	15

Round of 16
(South Korea) Nam Hyun-Hee	15
(Tunisia) Ines Boubakri	11
(Russia) Yevgeniya Lamonova	12
(France) Corinne Maîtrejean	15

Quarterfinals
(South Korea) Nam Hyun-Hee	15
(France) Corinne Maîtrejean	5

==== Section 2 ====
Round of 64
(South Korea) Jeon Hee-Sook	15
(Canada) Kelleigh Ryan	8
(United States) Nicole Ross	15
(Japan) Kanae Ikehata	5
(Germany) Martina Zacke	10
(United Kingdom) Martina Emanuel	15
(Israel) Bella Zamlin	6
(Germany) Katja Wächter	15
(Russia) Inna Deriglazova	15
(Ukraine) Olha Leleiko	13
(Canada) Annie-Claude Therrien	2
(Hungary) Aida Mohamed	15
(Austria) Sandra Kleinberger	10
(United States) Lee Kiefer	15
(Venezuela) Yulitza Suarez	4
(Italy) Elisa di Francisca	15

Round of 32
(South Korea) Jeon Hee-Sook	7
(United States) Nicole Ross	5
(United Kingdom) Martina Emanuel	12
(Germany) Katja Wächter	15
(Russia) Inna Deriglazova	12
(Hungary) Aida Mohamed	13
(United States) Lee Kiefer	5
(Italy) Elisa di Francisca	15

Round of 16
(South Korea) Jeon Hee-Sook	15
(Germany) Katja Wächter	12
(Hungary) Aida Mohamed	7
(Italy) Elisa di Francisca	15

Quarterfinals
(South Korea) Jeon Hee-Sook	10
(Italy) Elisa di Francisca	15

=== Bottom half ===
==== Section 3 ====
Round of 64
(Italy) Arianna Errigo	15
(Ukraine) Kateryna Chentsova	4
(South Korea) Seo Mi-jung	13
(United States) Doris Willette	10
(South Korea) Oh Ha-na	12
(Venezuela) Mariana González	11
(Canada) Shannon Comerford	6
(Russia) Yulia Biryukova	15
(Italy) Ilaria Salvatori	15
(Japan) Shiho Nishioka	3
(Hungary) Edina Knapek	8
(China) Chen Jinyan	10
(Germany) Sandra Bingenheimer	12
(United Kingdom) Natalia Sheppard	8
(Israel) Delila Hatuel	3
(Russia) Aida Shanaeva	15

Round of 32
(Italy) Arianna Errigo	15
(South Korea) Seo Mi-jung	3
(South Korea) Oh Ha-na	7
(Russia) Yulia Biryukova	15
(Italy) Ilaria Salvatori	15
(China) Chen Jinyan	5
(Germany) Sandra Bingenheimer	10
(Russia) Aida Shanaeva	15

Round of 16
(Italy) Arianna Errigo	15
(Russia) Yulia Biryukova	7
(Italy) Ilaria Salvatori	13
(Russia) Aida Shanaeva	15

Quarterfinals
(Italy) Arianna Errigo	15
(Russia) Aida Shanaeva	10

==== Section 4 ====
Round of 64
(Poland) Sylwia Gruchała	12
(Singapore) Yi Lin NG Ruth	8
(Poland) Anna Rybicka	15
(Ukraine) Olena Khishmatulina	14
(Germany) Carolin Golubytskyi	14
(Egypt) Shaimaa El Gammal	13
(Moldova) Oxana Cojocaru	5
(France) Astrid Guyart	15
(Hungary) Gabriella Varga	8
(Hungary) Fanny Kreiss	15
(United States) Nzingha Prescod	15
(Poland) Karolin Chlewinska	3
(Poland) Katarzyna Kryczalo	13
(China) Yu Shi	6
(Netherlands) Djinn Geurts	7
(Italy) Valentina Vezzali	15

Round of 32
(Poland) Sylwia Gruchała	11
(Poland) Anna Rybicka	5
(Germany) Carolin Golubytskyi	10
(France) Astrid Guyart	15
(Hungary) Fanny Kreiss	10
(United States) Nzingha Prescod	9
(Poland) Katarzyna Kryczalo	5
(Italy) Valentina Vezzali	15

Round of 16
(Poland) Sylwia Gruchała	15
(France) Astrid Guyart	7
(Hungary) Fanny Kreiss	8
(Italy) Valentina Vezzali	15

Quarterfinals
(Poland) Sylwia Gruchała	7
(Italy) Valentina Vezzali	8
