= Fencing at the 2014 Asian Games – Women's team foil =

Women's team foil at the 2014 Asian Games
- Venue: Goyang Gymnasium
- Date: 24 September 2014
- Competitors: 26 from 7 nations

Medalists
gold medal	South Korea; Jeon Hee-sook, Kim Mi-na, Nam Hyun-hee, Oh Ha-na
silver medal	China; Chen Bingbing, Le Huilin, Liu Yongshi, Wang Chen
bronze medal	Japan; Karin Miyawaki, Shiho Nishioka, Haruka Yanaoka
bronze medal	Hong Kong; Cheng Hiu Lam, Kimberley Cheung, Lin Po Heung, Liu Yan Wai

The women's team foil competition at the 2014 Asian Games in Goyang was held on 24 September at the Goyang Gymnasium.

== Schedule ==
All times are Korea Standard Time (UTC+09:00)

Date	Time	Event
Wednesday, 24 September 2014	09:00	Quarterfinals
Wednesday, 24 September 2014	10:30	Semifinals
Wednesday, 24 September 2014	18:00	Gold medal match

== Seeding ==
The teams were seeded taking into account the results achieved by competitors representing each team in the individual event.

Rank	Team	Fencer		Total
Rank	Team	1	2	Total
1	South Korea (KOR)	1	3	4
2	Hong Kong (HKG)	3	5	8
3	China (CHN)	2	11	13
4	Japan (JPN)	6	10	16
5	Singapore (SIN)	7	12	19
6	Macau (MAC)	13	17	30
7	Qatar (QAT)	15	16	31

== Results ==
Quarterfinals
5	Singapore	29
4	Japan	43
3	China	45
6	Macau	9
7	Qatar	4
2	Hong Kong	45

Semifinals
1	South Korea	45
4	Japan	29
3	China	42
2	Hong Kong	21

Gold medal match
1	South Korea	32
3	China	27

== Final standing ==
Rank	Team
1st place, gold medalist(s)	South Korea (KOR); Jeon Hee-sook; Kim Mi-na; Nam Hyun-hee; Oh Ha-na
2nd place, silver medalist(s)	China (CHN); Chen Bingbing; Le Huilin; Liu Yongshi; Wang Chen
3rd place, bronze medalist(s)	Japan (JPN); Karin Miyawaki; Shiho Nishioka; Haruka Yanaoka
3rd place, bronze medalist(s)	Hong Kong (HKG); Cheng Hiu Lam; Kimberley Cheung; Lin Po Heung; Liu Yan Wai
5	Singapore (SIN); Wang Wenying; Cheryl Wong; Nicole Wong; Liane Wong
6	Macau (MAC); Ho Ka U Ho Peng I Huang Liya
7	Qatar (QAT); Fatima Al-Mannai; Shikha Al-Mannai; Ghareeba Hammad; Lolwa Ali Hassan
