= Fencing at the 2015 SEA Games =

- Venue: OCBC Arena Hall 2
- Dates: 3–7 June 2015
- Competitors: 162 from 10 nations

Fencing at the 2015 SEA Games was held in OCBC Arena Hall 2, in Kallang, Singapore from 3 to 7 June 2015. Medals were awarded in six disciplines for both men and women competitions.

== Participating nations ==
A total of 162 athletes from 10 nations competed in fencing at the 2015 Southeast Asian Games:

- Brunei (4)
- Cambodia (6)
- Indonesia (24)
- Laos (6)
- Malaysia (17)
- Myanmar (14)
- Philippines (19)
- Singapore (24)
- Thailand (24)
- Vietnam (24)

== Competition schedule ==
The following was the competition schedule for the fencing competitions:

Q	Qualifications	R16	Round of 16	¼	Quarterfinals	½	Semifinals	B	Bronze medal match	F	Final

Event↓/Date →	Wed 3						Thu 4						Fri 5	Sat 6					Sun 7			
Men's individual épée	Q	R16	¼	½	B	F																
Men's team épée														R16	¼	½	B	F				
Men's individual foil							Q	R16	¼	½	B	F										
Men's team foil																			¼	½	B	F
Men's individual sabre	Q	R16	¼	½	B	F																
Men's team sabre														¼		½	B	F				
Women's individual épée							Q	R16	¼	½	B	F										
Women's team épée																			¼	½	B	F
Women's individual foil	Q	R16	¼	½	B	F																
Women's team foil														¼		½	B	F				
Women's individual sabre							Q	¼		½	B	F										
Women's team sabre																			¼	½	B	F

== Medalists ==
=== Men ===
Event	Gold	Silver	Bronze
Individual épée	Nguyễn Tiến Nhật; Vietnam	Lim Wei Wen; Singapore	Lee Mun Hou Samson; Singapore
Individual épée	Nguyễn Tiến Nhật; Vietnam	Lim Wei Wen; Singapore	Panthawit Chamcharern; Thailand
Team épée	Vietnam (VIE); Nguyễn Phước Đến; Nguyễn Tiến Nhật; Nguyễn Văn Thắng; Phạm Hùng Dương	Singapore (SIN); Willie Khoo Zile; Samson Lee Mun Hou; Lim Wei Wen; Aloysius Low Hoi Yeen	Indonesia (INA); Joneska Pitera Anggera; Muhammad Haerullah; Ryan Pratama; Yudi Pomos Setiawan
Team épée	Vietnam (VIE); Nguyễn Phước Đến; Nguyễn Tiến Nhật; Nguyễn Văn Thắng; Phạm Hùng Dương	Singapore (SIN); Willie Khoo Zile; Samson Lee Mun Hou; Lim Wei Wen; Aloysius Low Hoi Yeen	Thailand (THA); Panthawit Chamcharern; Supoj Chavalanarumit; Naphat Klueanphet; Wongsathon Songpraphai
Individual foil	Nontapat Panchan; Thailand	Nguyễn Minh Quang; Vietnam	Chan Kevin Jerrold; Singapore
Individual foil	Nontapat Panchan; Thailand	Nguyễn Minh Quang; Vietnam	Perez Nathaniel; Philippines
Team foil	Singapore (SIN); Chan Kevin Jerrold; Lim Joshua Ian; Ong Justin Xian Shi; Tan Yuan Zi	Philippines (PHI); Curioso Wilfred Richard; Louie Brennan Wayne; Perez Nathaniel; Segui Emerson	Thailand (THA); Mayakarn Sopanut; Panchan Nontapat; Phakungkoon Thapanun; Sritang-Orn Suppakorn
Team foil	Singapore (SIN); Chan Kevin Jerrold; Lim Joshua Ian; Ong Justin Xian Shi; Tan Yuan Zi	Philippines (PHI); Curioso Wilfred Richard; Louie Brennan Wayne; Perez Nathaniel; Segui Emerson	Indonesia (INA); Ricky Hafidz Jan Gunarto; Tauhid Ramadhan; Aryanto Agus Salim; Dennis Ariadinata Satriana
Individual sabre	Vũ Thành An; Vietnam	Choy Yu Yong; Singapore	Yu Peng Kean; Malaysia
Individual sabre	Vũ Thành An; Vietnam	Choy Yu Yong; Singapore	Wiradech Kothny; Thailand
Team sabre	Vietnam (VIE); Bùi Văn Tài; Nguyễn Văn Lợi; Tô Đức Anh; Vũ Thành An	Indonesia (INA); Ansyori Ade; Ricky Dhisullimah; Ruli Mauliadhani; Idon Jaya Wiguna	Singapore (SIN); Chan Wei Ren David; Choy Yu Yong; Leu Yi Yang Clive; Tseng Lin Fang
Team sabre	Vietnam (VIE); Bùi Văn Tài; Nguyễn Văn Lợi; Tô Đức Anh; Vũ Thành An	Indonesia (INA); Ansyori Ade; Ricky Dhisullimah; Ruli Mauliadhani; Idon Jaya Wiguna	Malaysia (MAS); Lindbichler Adam Nicholas; Rizal Mohamad Shafiq; Wong Tzer Chyuan; Yu Peng Kean

=== Women ===
Event	Gold	Silver	Bronze
Individual épée	Trần Thị Len; Vietnam	Harlene Raguin; Philippines	Wijitta Takhamwong; Thailand
Individual épée	Trần Thị Len; Vietnam	Harlene Raguin; Philippines	Rania Herlina Rahardja; Singapore
Team épée	Vietnam (VIE); Nguyễn Thanh Vân; Nguyễn Thị Như Hoa; Trần Thị Len; Trần Thị Thùy Trinh	Philippines (PHI); Abella Hanniel; Estimada Anna Gabriella; Harlene Raguin; Pangilinan Keren	Singapore (SIN); Lim Cheryl; Lim Elizabeth Ann Yu Yan; Lim Victoria Ann Xiu Yan; Rahardja Rania Herli
Team épée	Vietnam (VIE); Nguyễn Thanh Vân; Nguyễn Thị Như Hoa; Trần Thị Len; Trần Thị Thùy Trinh	Philippines (PHI); Abella Hanniel; Estimada Anna Gabriella; Harlene Raguin; Pangilinan Keren	Indonesia (INA); Isnawaty Idar; Megawati Megawati; Jeanned Nurhidayati; Dian Pertiwi
Individual foil	Wang Wenying; Singapore	Justine Gail Tinio; Philippines	Nguyễn Thị Hoài Thu; Vietnam
Individual foil	Wang Wenying; Singapore	Justine Gail Tinio; Philippines	Nunta Chantasuvannasin; Thailand
Team foil	Singapore (SIN); Wang Wenying; Wong Cheryl Ye Han; Wong Nicole Mae Hui Shan; Wong Ye Ying Liane	Vietnam (VIE); Đỗ Thị Anh; Lê Thị Bích; Lưu Thị Thanh Nhàn; Nguyễn Thị Hoài Thu	Philippines (PHI); Lozada Wilhelmina; Pangilinan Keren; Tinio Justine Gail; Estimada Anna Gabriella
Team foil	Singapore (SIN); Wang Wenying; Wong Cheryl Ye Han; Wong Nicole Mae Hui Shan; Wong Ye Ying Liane	Vietnam (VIE); Đỗ Thị Anh; Lê Thị Bích; Lưu Thị Thanh Nhàn; Nguyễn Thị Hoài Thu	Indonesia (INA); Flodesa Flodesa; Chintya Amreiny Pua; Herlin Erviana Purnamawati; Verdiana Rihandini
Individual sabre	Nguyễn Thị Lệ Dung; Vietnam	Sirawalai Starrat; Thailand	Lau Ywen; Singapore
Individual sabre	Nguyễn Thị Lệ Dung; Vietnam	Sirawalai Starrat; Thailand	Pornsawan Ngernrungruangroj; Thailand
Team sabre	Vietnam (VIE); Bùi Thị Thu Hà; Nguyễn Thị Lệ Dung; Nguyễn Thị Thanh Loan; Nguyễn Thị Thùy Chung	Thailand (THA); Manunya Patsara; Ngernrungruangroj Pornsawan; Pokeaw Tonpan; Starrat Sirawalai	Singapore (SIN); Cheung Sharmaine En-Qi; Lau Ywen; Lee Huimin Ann; Yong Mei Xin Christabel
Team sabre	Vietnam (VIE); Bùi Thị Thu Hà; Nguyễn Thị Lệ Dung; Nguyễn Thị Thanh Loan; Nguyễn Thị Thùy Chung	Thailand (THA); Manunya Patsara; Ngernrungruangroj Pornsawan; Pokeaw Tonpan; Starrat Sirawalai	Indonesia (INA); Anggraini Reni; Diah Permatasari; Ima Sapitri; Novi Susanti

== Medal table ==
* Host nation (Singapore)

Rank	Nation	Gold	Silver	Bronze	Total
1	Vietnam (VIE)	8	2	1	11
2	Singapore (SIN)*	3	3	7	13
3	Thailand (THA)	1	2	7	10
4	Philippines (PHI)	0	4	2	6
5	Indonesia (INA)	0	1	5	6
6	Malaysia (MAS)	0	0	2	2
Totals (6 entries)		12	12	24	48
