= Fencing at the 2014 Asian Games – Women's individual foil =

Women's individual foil at the 2014 Asian Games
- Venue: Goyang Gymnasium
- Date: 21 September 2014
- Competitors: 17 from 10 nations

Medalists
gold medal	Jeon Hee-sook	South Korea
silver medal	Le Huilin	China
bronze medal	Lin Po Heung	Hong Kong
bronze medal	Nam Hyun-hee	South Korea

The women's individual foil competition at the 2014 Asian Games in Goyang was held on 21 September at the Goyang Gymnasium.

== Schedule ==
All times are Korea Standard Time (UTC+09:00)

Date	Time	Event
Sunday, 21 September 2014	09:00	Preliminaries
Sunday, 21 September 2014	11:30	Round of 16
Sunday, 21 September 2014	13:00	Quarterfinals
Sunday, 21 September 2014	18:00	Semifinals
Sunday, 21 September 2014	19:50	Gold medal match

== Results ==
=== Preliminaries ===
==== Pool A ====
Athlete	KOR	JPN	HKG	SIN	MAC	LIB
Jeon Hee-sook (KOR)	—	4–3	5–4	5–3	5–0	5–3
Karin Miyawaki (JPN)	3–4	—	5–4	5–2	5–2	4–5
Lin Po Heung (HKG)	4–5	4–5	—	0–5	5–1	2–5
Liane Wong (SIN)	3–5	2–5	5–0	—	5–1	2–5
Ho Peng I (MAC)	0–5	2–5	1–5	1–5	—	0–5
Mona Shaito (LIB)	3–5	5–4	5–2	5–2	5–0	—

==== Pool B ====
Athlete	CHN	JPN	SIN	UZB	MAC	QAT
Le Huilin (CHN)	—	5–1	5–1	5–0	5–1	5–0
Haruka Yanaoka (JPN)	1–5	—	4–3	5–3	5–2	5–0
Cheryl Wong (SIN)	1–5	3–4	—	5–2	5–3	5–1
Gulmira Ziyaeva (UZB)	0–5	3–5	2–5	—	2–5	5–4
Ho Ka U (MAC)	1–5	2–5	3–5	5–2	—	5–0
Fatima Al-Mannai (QAT)	0–5	0–5	1–5	4–5	0–5	—

==== Pool C ====
Athlete	KOR	CHN	HKG	THA	QAT
Nam Hyun-hee (KOR)	—	5–3	2–3	5–1	5–0
Wang Chen (CHN)	3–5	—	4–5	5–1	5–0
Liu Yan Wai (HKG)	3–2	5–4	—	5–2	5–1
Nunta Chantasuvannasin (THA)	1–5	1–5	2–5	—	5–3
Ghareeba Hammad (QAT)	0–5	0–5	1–5	3–5	—

==== Summary ====
Rank	Pool	Athlete	W	L	W/M	TD	TF
1	B	Le Huilin (CHN)	5	0	1.000	+22	25
2	A	Jeon Hee-sook (KOR)	5	0	1.000	+11	24
3	C	Liu Yan Wai (HKG)	4	0	1.000	+9	18
4	A	Mona Shaito (LIB)	4	1	0.800	+10	23
5	B	Haruka Yanaoka (JPN)	4	1	0.800	+7	20
6	C	Nam Hyun-hee (KOR)	3	1	0.750	+10	17
7	A	Karin Miyawaki (JPN)	3	2	0.600	+5	22
8	B	Cheryl Wong (SIN)	3	2	0.600	+4	19
9	C	Wang Chen (CHN)	2	2	0.500	+6	17
10	A	Liane Wong (SIN)	2	3	0.400	+1	17
11	B	Ho Ka U (MAC)	2	3	0.400	−1	16
12	C	Nunta Chantasuvannasin (THA)	1	3	0.250	−9	9
13	A	Lin Po Heung (HKG)	1	4	0.200	−6	15
14	B	Gulmira Ziyaeva (UZB)	1	4	0.200	−12	12
15	C	Ghareeba Hammad (QAT)	0	4	0.000	−16	4
16	B	Fatima Al-Mannai (QAT)	0	5	0.000	−20	5
17	A	Ho Peng I (MAC)	0	5	0.000	−21	4

=== Knockout round ===
Round of 16
9	Wang Chen (CHN)	12
8	Cheryl Wong (SIN)	15
5	Haruka Yanaoka (JPN)	9
12	Nunta Chantasuvannasin (THA)	15
13	Lin Po Heung (HKG)	15
4	Mona Shaito (LIB)	5
11	Ho Ka U (MAC)	1
6	Nam Hyun-hee (KOR)	15
7	Karin Miyawaki (JPN)	15
10	Liane Wong (SIN)	9

Quarterfinals
1	Le Huilin (CHN)	15
8	Cheryl Wong (SIN)	5
12	Nunta Chantasuvannasin (THA)	9
13	Lin Po Heung (HKG)	15
3	Liu Yan Wai (HKG)	4
6	Nam Hyun-hee (KOR)	15
7	Karin Miyawaki (JPN)	11
2	Jeon Hee-sook (KOR)	12

Semifinals
1	Le Huilin (CHN)	13
13	Lin Po Heung (HKG)	11
3	Nam Hyun-hee (KOR)	7
2	Jeon Hee-sook (KOR)	15

Gold medal match
1	Le Huilin (CHN)	6
2	Jeon Hee-sook (KOR)	15

== Final standing ==
Rank	Athlete
1st place, gold medalist(s)	Jeon Hee-sook (KOR)
2nd place, silver medalist(s)	Le Huilin (CHN)
3rd place, bronze medalist(s)	Lin Po Heung (HKG)
3rd place, bronze medalist(s)	Nam Hyun-hee (KOR)
5	Liu Yan Wai (HKG)
6	Karin Miyawaki (JPN)
7	Cheryl Wong (SIN)
8	Nunta Chantasuvannasin (THA)
9	Mona Shaito (LIB)
10	Haruka Yanaoka (JPN)
11	Wang Chen (CHN)
12	Liane Wong (SIN)
13	Ho Ka U (MAC)
14	Gulmira Ziyaeva (UZB)
15	Ghareeba Hammad (QAT)
16	Fatima Al-Mannai (QAT)
17	Ho Peng I (MAC)
