= Fencing at the 2015 SEA Games – Women's team épée =

Fencing – Women's team épée at the 2015 SEA Games
- Venue: OCBC Arena Hall 2
- Date: 7 June 2015
- Competitors: 23 from 6 nations

Medalists
gold medal	Nguyễn Thanh Vân; Nguyễn Thị Như Hoa; Trần Thị Len; Trần Thị Thùy Trinh	Vietnam
silver medal	Abella Hanniel; Estimada Anna Gabriella; Harlene Raguin; Pangilinan Keren	Philippines
bronze medal	Lim Cheryl; Lim Elizabeth Ann Yu Yan; Lim Victoria Ann Xiu Yan; Rahardja Rania Herli	Singapore
bronze medal	Idar Isnawaty; Megawati Megawati; Nurhidayati Jeanned; Pertiwi Dian	Indonesia

The women's team épée competition of the fencing event at the 2015 SEA Games was held on 7 June 2015 at the OCBC Arena Hall 2 in Kallang, Singapore.

== Schedule ==
Date	Time	Round
Saturday, 7 June 2015	14:00	Quarterfinals
Saturday, 7 June 2015	16:15	Semifinals
Saturday, 7 June 2015	18:45	Gold medal match

== Results ==
Source: Event Summary

Quarterfinal; 7 June 14:00
Vietnam (VIE)
Bye
Indonesia (INA)	44
Thailand (THA)	42
Philippines (PHI)	45
Myanmar (MYA)	25
Bye
Singapore (SIN)

Semifinal; 7 June 16:15
Vietnam (VIE)	38
Indonesia (INA)	34
Philippines (PHI)	29
Singapore (SIN)	28

Gold medal match 7 June 18:45
Vietnam (VIE)	45
Philippines (PHI)	28

== Final standing ==
Source: Final Standings - Women's team épée

Rank	Team
Finals
1st place, gold medalist(s)	Vietnam (VIE); Nguyễn Thanh Vân; Nguyễn Thị Như Hoa; Trần Thị Len; Trần Thị Thùy Trinh
2nd place, silver medalist(s)	Philippines (PHI); Abella Hanniel; Estimada Anna Gabriella; Harlene Raguin; Pangilinan Keren
3rd place, bronze medalist(s)	Singapore (SIN); Lim Cheryl; Lim Elizabeth Ann Yu Yan; Lim Victoria Ann Xiu Yan; Rahardja Rania Herli
3rd place, bronze medalist(s)	Indonesia (INA); Idar Isnawaty; Megawati Megawati; Nurhidayati Jeanned; Pertiwi Dian
Quarterfinals
5	Thailand (THA); Maksin Daret; Akhamwong Wijitta; Thanee Korawan; Thongphueak Wanwipa
6	Myanmar (MYA); Htike Let Yee; Htwe Su Hlaing; Thin Zar Zar
