= Fencing at the 2015 SEA Games – Men's sabre =

Fencing – Men's sabre at the 2015 SEA Games
- Venue: OCBC Arena Hall 2
- Date: 3 June 2015
- Competitors: 14 from 7 nations

Medalists
gold medal	Vũ Thành An	Vietnam
silver medal	Yu Yong Choy	Singapore
bronze medal	Wiradech Kothny	Thailand
bronze medal	Yu Peng Kean	Malaysia

The men's sabre competition of the fencing event at the 2015 SEA Games was held on 3 June 2015 at the OCBC Arena Hall 2 in Singapore.

== Schedule ==
Date	Time	Round
Wednesday, 3 June 2015	12:00	Round of Pools
Wednesday, 3 June 2015	15:10	Round of 16
Wednesday, 3 June 2015	16:20	Quarterfinals
Wednesday, 3 June 2015	18:20	Semifinals
Wednesday, 3 June 2015	19:40	Final

== Results ==
=== Pool round ===
Rank	Athlete	W	L	W/M	TD	TF
1	Vũ Thành An (VIE)	6	0	1.000	+19	30
2	Wiradech Kothny (THA)	5	1	0.833	+12	29
3	Nguyễn Xuân Lợi (VIE)	5	1	0.833	+8	28
4	Yu Peng Kean (MAS)	4	2	0.667	+8	25
5	Brando Eric Ii (PHI)	4	2	0.667	0	25
6	Yu Yong Choy (SIN)	3	3	0.500	+1	21
7	Awang Haji Hamid Mohammad Yunos (BRU)	3	3	0.500	–3	21
8	Leu Yi Yang Clive (SIN)	3	3	0.500	–3	20
9	Mauliadhani Ruli (INA)	2	4	0.333	+1	25
10	Haekerd Ruangrit (THA)	2	4	0.333	–2	21
11	Dhisullimah Ricky (INA)	2	4	0.333	–5	22
12	Nocom Gian Carlo (PHI)	2	4	0.333	–5	20
13	Wong Tzer Chyuan (MAS)	1	5	0.167	–6	21
14	Asahrin Mohammad Haziq (BRU)	0	6	0.000	–25	5

=== Knockout round ===
Round of 16; 3 June 15:10
Thành An (VIE)
Bye
Mauliadhani (INA)	12
Leu (SIN)	15
Brando (PHI)
Bye
Bye
Kean (MAS)
Xuân Lợi (VIE)
Bye
Dhisullimah (INA)	12
Choy (SIN)	15
Yunos (BRU)	14
Haekerd (THA)	15
Bye
Wiradech (THA)

Quarterfinal; 3 June 16:20
Thành An (VIE)	15
Leu (SIN)	5
Brando (PHI)	11
Kean (MAS)	15
Xuân Lợi (VIE)	10
Choy (SIN)	15
Haekerd (THA)	3
Wiradech (THA)	15

Semifinal; 3 June 18:20
Thành An (VIE)	15
Kean (MAS)	4
Choy (SIN)	15
Wiradech (THA)	12

Gold medal match 3 June 19:40
Thành An (VIE)	15
Choy (SIN)	11

== Final standing ==
Rank	Athlete
Finals
1st place, gold medalist(s)	Vũ Thành An (VIE)
2nd place, silver medalist(s)	Yu Yong Choy (SIN)
3rd place, bronze medalist(s)	Wiradech Kothny (THA)
3rd place, bronze medalist(s)	Yu Peng Kean (MAS)
Quarterfinals
5	Nguyễn Xuân Lợi (VIE)
6	Brando Eric Ii (PHI)
7	Leu Yi Yang Clive (SIN)
8	Haekerd Ruangrit (THA)
Round of 16
9	Awang Haji Hamid Mohammad Yunos (BRU)
10	Mauliadhani Ruli (INA)
11	Dhisullimah Ricky (INA)
Round of Pools
12	Nocom Gian Carlo (PHI)
13	Wong Tzer Chyuan (MAS)
14	Asahrin Mohammad Haziq (BRU)
