= Fencing at the 2015 SEA Games – Men's team foil =

Fencing – Men's team foil at the 2015 SEA Games
- Venue: OCBC Arena Hall 2
- Date: 7 June 2015
- Competitors: 31 from 8 nations

Medalists
gold medal	Chan Kevin Jerrold; Lim Joshua Ian; Ong Justin Xian Shi; Tan Yuan Zi	Singapore
silver medal	Curioso Wilfred Richard; Louie Brennan Wayne; Perez Nathaniel; Segui Emerson	Philippines
bronze medal	Mayakarn Sopanut; Panchan Nontapat; Phakungkoon Thapanun; Sritang-Orn Suppakorn	Thailand
bronze medal	Gunarto Ricky Hafidz Jan; Ramadhan Tauhid; Salim Aryanto Agus; Satriana Dennis Ariadinata	Indonesia

The men's team foil competition of the fencing event at the 2015 SEA Games was held on 7 June 2015 at the OCBC Arena Hall 2 in Kallang, Singapore.

== Schedule ==
Date	Time	Round
Saturday, 7 June 2015	13:00	Quarterfinals
Saturday, 7 June 2015	15:30	Semifinals
Saturday, 7 June 2015	18:00	Gold medal match

== Results ==
Source: Event Summary

Quarterfinal; 7 June 13:00
Singapore (SIN)	45
Cambodia (CAM)	12
Indonesia (INA)	45
Vietnam (VIE)	38
Philippines (PHI)	45
Malaysia (MAS)	18
Myanmar (MYA)	14
Thailand (THA)	45

Semifinal; 7 June 15:30
Singapore (SIN)	45
Indonesia (INA)	21
Philippines (PHI)	45
Thailand (THA)	33

Gold medal match 7 June 18:00
Singapore (SIN)	45
Philippines (PHI)	40

== Final standing ==
Source: Final Standings - Men's team foil

Rank	Team
Finals
1st place, gold medalist(s)	Singapore (SIN); Chan Kevin Jerrold; Lim Joshua Ian; Ong Justin Xian Shi; Tan Yuan Zi
2nd place, silver medalist(s)	Philippines (PHI); Curioso Wilfred Richard; Louie Brennan Wayne; Perez Nathaniel; Segui Emerson
3rd place, bronze medalist(s)	Thailand (THA); Mayakarn Sopanut; Panchan Nontapat; Phakungkoon Thapanun; Sritang-Orn Suppakorn
3rd place, bronze medalist(s)	Indonesia (INA); Gunarto Ricky Hafidz Jan; Ramadhan Tauhid; Salim Aryanto Agus; Satriana Dennis Ariadinata
Quarterfinals
5	Vietnam (VIE); Lưu Hồng Sơn; Nguyễn Minh Quang; Nguyễn Quốc Oai; Phạm Quốc Tài
6	Malaysia (MAS); Anuar Muhammad Aqil; Cheng Xing Han; Emir Putra Syed Adil; Ismail Nurul Affiq N
7	Myanmar (MYA); Aung Naing Lin; Htut Saw Simam; Thiha Min
8	Cambodia (CAM); Chim Theara; Hang Chetha; Khim Sammean; Thong Tangchin
