= Fencing at the 2018 Asian Games – Women's individual foil =

Women's individual foil at the 2018 Asian Games
- Venue: Jakarta Convention Center
- Date: 20 August 2018
- Competitors: 25 from 14 nations

Medalists
gold medal	Jeon Hee-sook	South Korea
silver medal	Fu Yiting	China
bronze medal	Liu Yan Wai	Hong Kong
bronze medal	Sera Azuma	Japan

The women's individual foil competition at the 2018 Asian Games in Jakarta was held on 20 August at the Jakarta Convention Center.

== Schedule ==
All times are Western Indonesia Time (UTC+07:00)

Date	Time	Event
Monday, 20 August 2018	09:00	Preliminaries
Monday, 20 August 2018	12:15	Round of 32
Monday, 20 August 2018	13:05	Round of 16
Monday, 20 August 2018	14:45	Quarterfinals
Monday, 20 August 2018	18:00	Semifinals
Monday, 20 August 2018	19:40	Gold medal match

== Results ==
=== Preliminaries ===
==== Pool A ====
Athlete	KOR	TPE	HKG	MAC	INA	UAE	LBN
Jeon Hee-sook (KOR)	—	3–2	5–1	5–0	5–0	5–0	0–5
Cheng Hsin (TPE)	2–3	—	3–5	5–2	5–4	5–0	5–4
Liu Yan Wai (HKG)	1–5	5–3	—	5–0	5–4	5–4	5–4
Ho Peng I (MAC)	0–5	2–5	0–5	—	5–4	5–0	3–5
Nurul Aini (INA)	0–5	4–5	4–5	4–5	—	5–2	1–5
Latifa Al-Hosani (UAE)	0–5	0–5	4–5	0–5	2–5	—	0–5
Mona Shaito (LBN)	5–0	4–5	4–5	5–3	5–1	5–0	—

==== Pool B ====
Athlete	KOR	HKG	SGP	VIE	TPE	THA
Nam Hyun-hee (KOR)	—	5–3	1–5	0–5	5–4	5–0
Kimberley Cheung (HKG)	3–5	—	4–5	5–3	4–5	5–0
Maxine Wong (SGP)	5–1	5–4	—	3–5	5–2	5–1
Đỗ Thị Anh (VIE)	5–0	3–5	5–3	—	2–5	5–0
Yang Chin-man (TPE)	4–5	5–4	2–5	5–2	—	5–0
Karanikar Siribrahmanakul (THA)	0–5	0–5	1–5	0–5	0–5	—

==== Pool C ====
Athlete	JPN	CHN	PHI	THA	MAC	LBN
Karin Miyawaki (JPN)	—	0–5	5–2	5–0	5–2	5–2
Fu Yiting (CHN)	5–0	—	5–0	5–0	5–0	5–0
Samantha Catantan (PHI)	2–5	0–5	—	5–1	5–1	5–2
Ploypailin Thongchampa (THA)	0–5	0–5	1–5	—	2–5	5–1
Ho Ka U (MAC)	2–5	0–5	1–5	5–2	—	5–3
Rita Abou Jaoude (LBN)	2–5	0–5	2–5	1–5	3–5	—

==== Pool D ====
Athlete	CHN	JPN	PHI	SGP	MAS	INA
Huo Xingxin (CHN)	—	1–5	5–4	3–5	5–0	5–1
Sera Azuma (JPN)	5–1	—	5–4	5–3	5–1	5–1
Maxine Esteban (PHI)	4–5	4–5	—	4–5	5–0	5–4
Amita Berthier (SGP)	5–3	3–5	5–4	—	5–0	5–0
Tyanne Fong (MAS)	0–5	1–5	0–5	0–5	—	0–5
Mery Ananda (INA)	1–5	1–5	4–5	0–5	5–0	—

==== Summary ====
Rank	Pool	Athlete	W	L	W/M	TD	TF
1	C	Fu Yiting (CHN)	5	0	1.000	+25	25
2	D	Sera Azuma (JPN)	5	0	1.000	+15	25
3	A	Jeon Hee-sook (KOR)	5	1	0.833	+15	23
4	A	Liu Yan Wai (HKG)	5	1	0.833	+6	26
5	D	Amita Berthier (SGP)	4	1	0.800	+11	23
6	B	Maxine Wong (SGP)	4	1	0.800	+10	23
7	C	Karin Miyawaki (JPN)	4	1	0.800	+9	20
8	A	Mona Shaito (LBN)	4	2	0.667	+14	28
9	A	Cheng Hsin (TPE)	4	2	0.667	+7	25
10	B	Đỗ Thị Anh (VIE)	3	2	0.600	+7	20
11	B	Yang Chin-man (TPE)	3	2	0.600	+5	21
12	D	Huo Xingxin (CHN)	3	2	0.600	+4	19
13	C	Samantha Catantan (PHI)	3	2	0.600	+3	17
14	B	Nam Hyun-hee (KOR)	3	2	0.600	−1	16
15	D	Maxine Esteban (PHI)	2	3	0.400	+3	22
16	B	Kimberley Cheung (HKG)	2	3	0.400	+3	21
17	C	Ho Ka U (MAC)	2	3	0.400	−7	13
18	A	Ho Peng I (MAC)	2	4	0.333	−9	15
19	D	Mery Ananda (INA)	1	4	0.200	−9	11
20	C	Ploypailin Thongchampa (THA)	1	4	0.200	−13	8
21	A	Nurul Aini (INA)	1	5	0.167	−9	18
22	C	Rita Abou Jaoude (LBN)	0	5	0.000	−17	8
23	A	Latifa Al-Hosani (UAE)	0	6	0.000	−24	6
24	D	Tyanne Fong (MAS)	0	5	0.000	−24	1
24	B	Karanikar Siribrahmanakul (THA)	0	5	0.000	−24	1

=== Knockout round ===
==== Final ====
Gold medal match
1	Fu Yiting (CHN)	3
3	Jeon Hee-sook (KOR)	8

==== Top half ====
Round of 32
17	Ho Ka U (MAC)	2
16	Kimberley Cheung (HKG)	15
13	Samantha Catantan (PHI)	15
20	Ploypailin Thongchampa (THA)	6

Round of 16
1	Fu Yiting (CHN)	14
16	Kimberley Cheung (HKG)	12
9	Cheng Hsin (TPE)	15
8	Mona Shaito (LBN)	12
5	Amita Berthier (SGP)	8
12	Huo Xingxin (CHN)	15
13	Samantha Catantan (PHI)	14
4	Liu Yan Wai (HKG)	15

Quarterfinals
1	Fu Yiting (CHN)	14
9	Cheng Hsin (TPE)	7
12	Huo Xingxin (CHN)	8
4	Liu Yan Wai (HKG)	15

Semifinals
1	Fu Yiting (CHN)	15
4	Liu Yan Wai (HKG)	10

==== Bottom half ====
Round of 32
19	Mery Ananda (INA)	12
14	Nam Hyun-hee (KOR)	15
15	Maxine Esteban (PHI)	15
18	Ho Peng I (MAC)	9

Round of 16
3	Jeon Hee-sook (KOR)	13
14	Nam Hyun-hee (KOR)	8
11	Yang Chin-man (TPE)	8
6	Maxine Wong (SGP)	15
7	Karin Miyawaki (JPN)	15
10	Đỗ Thị Anh (VIE)	10
15	Maxine Esteban (PHI)	8
2	Sera Azuma (JPN)	15

Quarterfinals
3	Jeon Hee-sook (KOR)	15
6	Maxine Wong (SGP)	7
7	Karin Miyawaki (JPN)	7
2	Sera Azuma (JPN)	15

Semifinals
3	Jeon Hee-sook (KOR)	15
2	Sera Azuma (JPN)	9

== Final standing ==
Rank	Athlete
1st place, gold medalist(s)	Jeon Hee-sook (KOR)
2nd place, silver medalist(s)	Fu Yiting (CHN)
3rd place, bronze medalist(s)	Liu Yan Wai (HKG)
3rd place, bronze medalist(s)	Sera Azuma (JPN)
5	Maxine Wong (SGP)
6	Karin Miyawaki (JPN)
7	Cheng Hsin (TPE)
8	Huo Xingxin (CHN)
9	Amita Berthier (SGP)
10	Mona Shaito (LBN)
11	Đỗ Thị Anh (VIE)
12	Yang Chin-man (TPE)
13	Samantha Catantan (PHI)
14	Nam Hyun-hee (KOR)
15	Maxine Esteban (PHI)
16	Kimberley Cheung (HKG)
17	Ho Ka U (MAC)
18	Ho Peng I (MAC)
19	Mery Ananda (INA)
20	Ploypailin Thongchampa (THA)
21	Nurul Aini (INA)
22	Rita Abou Jaoude (LBN)
23	Latifa Al-Hosani (UAE)
24	Tyanne Fong (MAS)
24	Karanikar Siribrahmanakul (THA)
