= Fencing at the 2015 SEA Games – Men's épée =

Fencing – Men's épée at the 2015 SEA Games
- Venue: OCBC Arena Hall 2
- Date: 3 June 2015
- Competitors: 18 from 9 nations

Medalists
gold medal	Nguyễn Tiến Nhật	Vietnam
silver medal	Lim Wei Wen	Singapore
bronze medal	Lee Mun Hou Samson	Singapore
bronze medal	Panthawit Chamcharern	Thailand

The men's épée competition of the fencing event at the 2015 SEA Games was held on 3 June 2015 at the Singapore Sports Hub's OCBC Arena Hall 2 in Kallang, Singapore.

== Schedule ==
Date	Time	Round
Wednesday, 3 June 2015	9:30	Round of Pools
Wednesday, 3 June 2015	14:00	Round of 16
Wednesday, 3 June 2015	15:30	Quarterfinals
Wednesday, 3 June 2015	17:00	Semifinals
Wednesday, 3 June 2015	19:00	Final

== Results ==
=== Pool round ===
Rank	Athlete	W	L	W/M	TD	TF
1	Nguyễn Tiến Nhật (VIE)	5	0	1.000	+20	25
2	Klueanphet Naphat (THA)	4	1	0.800	+14	24
3	Koh I Jie (MAS)	4	1	0.800	+9	24
4	Nguyễn Phước Đến (VIE)	4	1	0.800	+9	22
5	Lee Mun Hou Samson (SIN)	4	1	0.800	+7	22
6	Chamcharern Panthawit (THA)	4	1	0.800	+6	22
7	Lim Wei Wen (SIN)	3	2	0.600	+4	20
8	Rodriguez Gian Franco (PHI)	3	2	0.600	+3	21
9	Haerullah Muhammad (INA)	3	2	0.600	+1	20
10	Mohamed Mohamad Roslan (MAS)	3	2	0.600	–2	16
11	Pratama Ryan (INA)	2	3	0.400	0	20
12	Jose Noelito Jr. (PHI)	2	3	0.400	–3	20
13	Htet Zaw (MYA)	1	4	0.200	–7	13
14	Khim Sammean (CAM)	1	4	0.200	–9	15
14	Chanthasida Chanthalangsy (LAO)	1	4	0.200	–9	15
16	Aung Wine Thet (MYA)	1	4	0.200	–10	14
17	Thong Tangchin (CAM)	0	5	0.000	–12	13
18	Choulamany Anomone (LAO)	0	5	0.000	–21	4

=== Knockout round ===
Round of 16; 3 June 14:00
Tiến Nhật (VIE)
Bye
Haerullah (INA)	15
Rodriguez (PHI)	13
Hou Samson (SIN)	15
Jose (PHI)	6
Zaw (MYA)	10
Phước Đến (VIE)	15
Koh (MAS)	15
Khim (CAM)	5
Pratama (INA)	6
Chamcharern (THA)	15
Wei Wen (SIN)	15
Mohamed (MAS)	5
Chanthasida (LAO)	10
Klueanphet (THA)	15

Quarterfinal; 3 June 15:30
Tiến Nhật (VIE)	15
Haerullah (INA)	8
Hou Samson (SIN)	15
Phước Đến (VIE)	14
Koh (MAS)	11
Chamcharern (THA)	15
Wei Wen (SIN)	15
Klueanphet (THA)	13

Semifinal; 3 June 17:00
Tiến Nhật (VIE)	15
Hou Samson (SIN)	9
Chamcharern (THA)	14
Wei Wen (SIN)	15

Gold medal match 3 June 19:00
Tiến Nhật (VIE)	15
Wei Wen (SIN)	8

== Final standing ==
Rank	Athlete
Final
1st place, gold medalist(s)	Nguyễn Tiến Nhật (VIE)
2nd place, silver medalist(s)	Lim Wei Wen (SIN)
3rd place, bronze medalist(s)	Lee Mun Hou Samson (SIN)
3rd place, bronze medalist(s)	Panthawit Chamcharern (THA)
Quarterfinals
5	Naphat Klueanphet (THA)
6	Koh I Jie (MAS)
7	Nguyễn Phước Đến (VIE)
8	Muhammad Haerullah (INA)
Round of 16
9	Chanthalangsy Chanthasida (LAO)
10	Gian Franco Rodriguez (PHI)
11	Mohamad Roslan Mohamed (MAS)
12	Ryan Pratama (INA)
13	Noelito Jr. Jose (PHI)
14	Htet Zaw (MYA)
15	Khim Sammean (CAM)
16	Aung Wine Thet (MYA)
17	Thong Tangchin (CAM)
18	Anomone Choulamany (LAO)
