= Fencing at the 2015 SEA Games – Men's team épée =

Singapore men's fencing event

Fencing – Men's team épée at the 2015 SEA Games
- Venue: OCBC Arena Hall 2
- Date: 6 June 2015
- Competitors: 32 from 8 nations

The men's team épée competition of the fencing event at the 2015 SEA Games is being held on 6 June 2015 at the OCBC Arena Hall 2 in Singapore.

== Schedule ==
Date	Time	Round
Saturday, 6 June 2015	14:00	Quarterfinals
Saturday, 6 June 2015	15:30	Semifinals
Saturday, 6 June 2015	18:00	Gold medal match

== Results ==
Source: Event Summary

Quarterfinal; 6 June 14:00
Singapore (SIN)	45
Cambodia (CAM)	19
Indonesia (INA)	45
Malaysia (MAS)	31
Thailand (THA)	45
Philippines (PHI)	40
Myanmar (MYA)	14
Vietnam (VIE)	45

Semifinal; 6 June 15:30
Singapore (SIN)	45
Indonesia (INA)	38
Thailand (THA)	17
Vietnam (VIE)	45

Gold medal match 6 June 18:00
Singapore (SIN)	43
Vietnam (VIE)	44

== Final standing ==
Rank	Team
1st place, gold medalist(s)	Vietnam (VIE); Nguyen Phuoc Den; Nguyen Tien Nhat; Nguyễn Văn Thắng; Pham Hung Duong
2nd place, silver medalist(s)	Singapore (SIN); Willie Khoo Zile; Samson Lee Mun Hou; Lim Wei Wen; Aloysius Low Hoi Yeen
3rd place, bronze medalist(s)	Thailand (THA); Panthawit Chamcharern; Supoj Chavalanarumit; Naphat Klueanphet; Wongsathon Songpraphai
3rd place, bronze medalist(s)	Indonesia (INA); Joneska Pitera Anggera; Muhammad Haerullah; Ryan Pratama; Yudi Setiawan
5	Malaysia (MAS); Shatyavanan B Murthy; Koh I Jie; Mohamad Ammaraluddin Mohamad Daud; Mohamad Roslan Mohamed
6	Philippines (PHI); Noelito Jose Jr. Nathaniel Perez; Gian Franco Rodriguez; Alamario Vizcayno
7	Myanmar (MYA); Aung Wine Thet; Htet Aung Myo; Htet Zaw; Sithu Ye
8	Cambodia (CAM); Theara Chim; Chetha Hang; Sammean Khim; Tangchin Thong
