= Women's team foil at the 2010 World Fencing Championships =

The Women's team foil event took place on November 10, 2010 at Grand Palais.

== Foil team ==
| Position | Country | Name |
|---|---|---|
| 1. | Italy | Elisa Di Francisca; Arianna Errigo; Ilaria Salvatori; Valentina Vezzali |
| 2. | Poland | Karolina Chlewińska; Sylwia Gruchala; Katarzyna Kryczalo; Anna Rybicka |
| 3. | South Korea | Jeon Hee-Sook; Nam Hyun-Hee; Oh Ha-Na; Seo Mi-Jung |
| 4. | Germany | Carolin Golubytskiy; Katja Wächter; Sandra Bingenheimer; Martina Zacke |
| 5. | France | Virginie Ujlaky; Astrid Guyart; Corrine Maitrejean; Gaelle Gebet |
| 6. | Russia | Yevgeniya Lamonova; Inna Deriglazova; Aida Shanaeva; Julia Birioukova |
| 7. | Ukraine | Kateryna Chentsova; Olena Khismatulina; Olga Leleyko; Anastasiya Moskovska |
| 8. | United States | Nzingha Prescod; Nicole Ross; Doris Willette; Lee Kiefer |

Quarter-finals
Italy | 45
France | 24
Ukraine | 31
Germany | 39
South Korea | 41
United States | 23
Poland | 45
Russia | 29

Semi-finals
Italy | 45
Germany | 30
South Korea | 37
Poland | 41

Final
Italy | 45
Poland | 37
Third place
Germany | 42
South Korea | 45
