= Fencing at the 2015 SEA Games – Men's team sabre =

Fencing – Men's team sabre at the 2015 SEA Games
- Venue: OCBC Arena Hall 2
- Date: 6 June 2015
- Competitors: 28 from 7 nations

Medalists
gold medal	Bùi Văn Tài; Nguyễn Văn Lợi; Tô Đức Anh; Vũ Thành An	Vietnam
silver medal	Ansyori Ade; Dhisullimah Ricky; Mauliadhani Ruli; Wiguna Idon	Indonesia
bronze medal	Chan Wei Ren David; Choy Yu Yong; Leu Yi Yang Clive; Tseng Lin Fang	Singapore
bronze medal	Lindbichler Adam Nicholas; Rizal Mohamad Shafiq; Wong Tzer Chyuan; Yu Peng Kean	Malaysia

The men's team sabre competition of the fencing event at the 2015 SEA Games was held on 6 June 2015 at the OCBC Arena Hall 2 in Kallang, Singapore.

== Schedule ==
Date	Time	Round
Saturday, 6 June 2015	15:00	Quarterfinals
Saturday, 6 June 2015	17:00	Semifinals
Saturday, 6 June 2015	19:30	Gold medal match

== Results ==
Quarterfinal; 6 June 15:00
Vietnam (VIE)
Bye
Philippines (PHI)	30
Malaysia (MAS)	45
Thailand (THA)	39
Indonesia (INA)	45
Brunei (BRU)	30
Singapore (SIN)	45

Semifinal; 6 June 17:00
Vietnam (VIE)	45
Malaysia (MAS)	37
Indonesia (INA)	45
Singapore (SIN)	35

Gold medal match 6 June 19:30
Vietnam (VIE)	45
Indonesia (INA)	30

== Final standing ==
Rank	Team
Finals
1st place, gold medalist(s)	Vietnam (VIE); Bùi Văn Tài; Nguyễn Văn Lợi; Tô Đức Anh; Vũ Thành An
2nd place, silver medalist(s)	Indonesia (INA); Ansyori Ade; Dhisullimah Ricky; Mauliadhani Ruli; Wiguna Idon
3rd place, bronze medalist(s)	Singapore (SIN); Chan Wei Ren David; Choy Yu Yong; Leu Yi Yang Clive; Tseng Lin Fang
3rd place, bronze medalist(s)	Malaysia (MAS); Lindbichler Adam Nicholas; Rizal Mohamad Shafiq; Wong Tzer Chyuan; Yu Peng Kean
Quarterfinals
5	Thailand (THA); Haekerd Ruangrit; Kothny Wiradech; Krajokleam Kan; Srinualnad Voragun
6	Philippines (PHI); Eric Ii Brando; Donnie Arth Navarro; Gian Carlo Nocom; Emerson Segui
7	Brunei (BRU); Asahrin Mohammad Haziq; Asahrin Muhd Anaqi Danish; Awang Haji Hamid Mohammad Yunos; Rahim Mohammad Hardiwan Shah
