= Fencing at the 2015 SEA Games – Men's foil =

Fencing – Men's foil at the 2015 SEA Games
- Venue: OCBC Arena Hall 2
- Date: 4 June 2015
- Competitors: 16 from 8 nations

Medalists
gold medal	Panchan Nontapat	Thailand
silver medal	Nguyễn Minh Quang	Vietnam
bronze medal	Perez Nathaniel	Philippines
bronze medal	Chan Kevin Jerrold	Singapore

The men's foil competition of the fencing event at the 2015 SEA Games was held on 4 June 2015 at the OCBC Arena Hall 2 in Singapore.

== Schedule ==
Date	Time	Round
Wednesday, 4 June 2015	9:30	Round of Pools
Wednesday, 4 June 2015	14:00	Round of 16
Wednesday, 4 June 2015	15:30	Quarterfinals
Wednesday, 4 June 2015	17:00	Semifinals
Wednesday, 4 June 2015	19:00	Final

== Results ==
=== Pool round ===
Rank	Athlete	W	L	W/M	TD	TF
1	Panchan Nontapat (THA)	4	0	1.000	+9	20
2	Ismail Nurul Affiq Nazril (MAS)	4	1	0.800	+10	24
2	Perez Nathaniel (PHI)	4	1	0.800	+10	24
4	Lim Joshua Ian (SIN)	4	1	0.800	+9	21
5	Chan Kevin Jerrold (SIN)	3	1	0.750	+7	19
6	Segui Emerson (PHI)	3	1	0.750	+7	18
7	Nguyễn Minh Quang (VIE)	3	1	0.750	+6	19
8	Gunarto Ricky Hafidz Jan (INA)	2	2	0.500	+1	16
9	Sritang-orn Suppakorn (THA)	2	2	0.500	0	16
10	Anuar Muhammad Aqil (MAS)	2	2	0.500	0	13
11	Satriana Dennis Ariadinata (INA)	2	3	0.400	–3	16
12	Nguyễn Quốc Oai (VIE)	1	3	0.250	–6	12
13	Htut Saw Simam (MYA)	1	4	0.200	–11	12
14	Thiha Min (MYA)	0	4	0.000	–11	9
15	Hang Chetha (CAM)	0	4	0.000	–13	7
16	Chim Theara (CAM)	0	5	0.000	–15	10

=== Knockout round ===
Round of 16; 4 June 14:00
Panchan (THA)
Bye
Sritang-orn (THA)	10
Gunarto (INA)	15
Jerrold (SIN)	15
Quốc Oai (VIE)	9
Bye
Ian (SIN)
Perez (PHI)
Bye
Satriana (INA)	15
Segui (PHI)	13
Minh Quang (VIE)	15
Anuar (MAS)	8
Bye
Ismail (MAS)

Quarterfinal; 4 June 15:30
Panchan (THA)	15
Gunarto (INA)	6
Jerrold (SIN)	15
Ian (SIN)	10
Perez (PHI)	15
Satriana (INA)	13
Minh Quang (VIE)	7
Ismail (MAS)	4

Semifinal; 4 June 17:00
Panchan (THA)	15
Jerrold (SIN)	6
Perez (PHI)	14
Minh Quang (VIE)	15

Gold medal match 4 June 19:00
Panchan (THA)	15
Minh Quang (VIE)	11

== Final standing ==
Rank	Athlete
Finals
1st place, gold medalist(s)	Panchan Nontapat (THA)
2nd place, silver medalist(s)	Nguyễn Minh Quang (VIE)
3rd place, bronze medalist(s)	Perez Nathaniel (PHI)
3rd place, bronze medalist(s)	Chan Kevin Jerrold (SIN)
Quarterfinals
5	Ismail Nurul Affiq Nazril (MAS)
6	Lim Joshua Ian (SIN)
7	Gunarto Ricky Hafidz Jan (INA)
8	Satriana Dennis Ariadinata (INA)
Round of 16
9	Segui Emerson (PHI)
10	Sritang-orn Suppakorn (THA)
11	Anuar Muhammad Aqil (MAS)
12	Nguyễn Quốc Oai (VIE)
Round of Pools
13	Htut Saw Simam (MYA)
14	Thiha Min (MYA)
15	Hang Chetha (CAM)
16	Chim Theara (CAM)
