= Fencing at the 2015 SEA Games – Women's épée =

Sports competition in Kallang, Singapore

Fencing – Women's épée at the 2015 SEA Games
- Venue: OCBC Arena Hall 2
- Date: 4 June 2015
- Competitors: 13 from 7 nations

Medalists
gold medal	Trần Thị Len	Vietnam
silver medal	Harlene Raguin	Philippines
bronze medal	Takhamwong Wijitta	Thailand
bronze medal	Rahardja Rania Herlina	Singapore

The women's épée competition of the fencing event at the 2015 SEA Games was held on 4 June 2015 at the OCBC Arena Hall 2 in Kallang, Singapore.

== Schedule ==
Date	Time	Round
Wednesday, 4 June 2015	9:30	Round of Pools
Wednesday, 4 June 2015	14:25	Round of 16
Wednesday, 4 June 2015	15:55	Quarterfinals
Wednesday, 4 June 2015	17:40	Semifinals
Wednesday, 4 June 2015	19:20	Final

== Results ==
=== Pool round ===
Rank	Athlete	W	L	W/M	TD	TF
1	Pertiwi Dian (INA)	6	0	1.000	+8	30
2	Lim Cheryl (SIN)	4	1	0.800	+6	21
3	Nguyễn Thị Như Hoa (VIE)	4	1	0.800	+6	18
4	Harlene Raguin (PHI)	4	2	0.667	+10	26
5	Abella Hanniel (PHI)	3	2	0.600	+5	23
6	Trần Thị Len (VIE)	3	3	0.500	+4	24
7	Takhamwong Wijitta (THA)	3	3	0.500	+3	26
8	Rahardja Rania Herlina (SIN)	3	3	0.500	–2	22
9	Thongphueak Wanwipa (THA)	2	3	0.400	–5	17
10	Idar Isnawaty (INA)	1	4	0.200	–3	18
11	Htike Let Yee (MYA)	1	4	0.200	–9	13
12	Simon Laura (MAS)	1	5	0.167	–8	20
13	Htwe Su Hlaing (MYA)	1	5	0.167	–15	14

=== Knockout round ===
Round of 16; 4 June 14:25
Pertiwi (INA)
Bye
Thongphueak (THA)	9
Herlina (SIN)	15
Hanniel (PHI)
Bye
Bye
Harlene Raguin (PHI)
Như Hoa (VIE)
Bye
Bye
Thị Len (VIE)
Takhamwong (THA)	15
Idar (INA)	9
Bye
Cheryl (SIN)

Quarterfinal; 4 June 15:55
Pertiwi (INA)	13
Herlina (SIN)	15
Hanniel (PHI)	12
Harlene Raguin (PHI)	15
Như Hoa (VIE)	6
Thị Len (VIE)	7
Takhamwong (THA)	15
Cheryl (SIN)	9

Semifinal; 4 June 17:40
Herlina (SIN)	10
Harlene Raguin (PHI)	15
Thị Len (VIE)	15
Takhamwong (THA)	8

Gold medal match 4 June 19:20
Harlene Raguin (PHI)	7
Thị Len (VIE)	11

== Final standing ==
Rank	Athlete
Finals
1st place, gold medalist(s)	Trần Thị Len (VIE)
2nd place, silver medalist(s)	Raguin Harlene (PHI)
3rd place, bronze medalist(s)	Takhamwong Wijitta (THA)
3rd place, bronze medalist(s)	Rahardja Rania Herlina (SIN)
Quarterfinals
5	Pertiwi Dian (INA)
6	Lim Cheryl (SIN)
7	Nguyễn Thị Như Hoa (VIE)
8	Abella Hanniel (PHI)
Round of 16
9	Thongphueak Wanwipa (THA)
10	Idar Isnawaty (INA)
Round of Pools
11	Htike Let Yee (MYA)
12	Simon Laura (MAS)
13	Htwe Su Hlaing (MYA)
