= Fencing at the 2023 SEA Games =

- Venue: Chroy Changvar Convention Centre
- Location: Phnom Penh, Cambodia
- Dates: 11–16 May 2023

Fencing competitions at the 2023 SEA Games took place at Chroy Changvar Convention Centre in Phnom Penh, Cambodia from 11 to 16 May 2023. The game featured 6 events, three individual and 3 team events.

== Medal table ==
* Host nation (Cambodia)

Rank	Nation	Gold	Silver	Bronze	Total
1	Singapore	7	3	6	16
2	Vietnam	4	3	3	10
3	Thailand	1	1	3	5
4	Philippines	0	5	5	10
5	Malaysia	0	0	4	4
6	Cambodia*	0	0	2	2
7	Indonesia	0	0	1	1
Totals (7 entries)		12	12	24	48

== Medalists ==
=== Men ===
Event	Gold	Silver	Bronze
Individual épée	Si To Jian Tong; Singapore	Noelito Jose; Philippines	Nguyễn Tiến Nhật; Vietnam
Individual épée	Si To Jian Tong; Singapore	Noelito Jose; Philippines	Simon Renjie Lee; Singapore
Team épée	Vietnam; Hoàng Nhật Nam; Nguyễn Phước Đến; Nguyễn Tiến Nhật; Trương Trần Nhật Minh	Thailand; Chinnaphat Chaloemchanen; Korakote Juengamnuaychai; Jadsadaporn Puengkuntod; Nattiphong Singkham	Singapore; Simon Renjie Lee; Bron Han Shen Sheum; Si To Jian Tong
Team épée	Vietnam; Hoàng Nhật Nam; Nguyễn Phước Đến; Nguyễn Tiến Nhật; Trương Trần Nhật Minh	Thailand; Chinnaphat Chaloemchanen; Korakote Juengamnuaychai; Jadsadaporn Puengkuntod; Nattiphong Singkham	Philippines; Jian Miguel Bautista; Rex Fernandez Delacruz; Lee Eigran Ergina; Noelito Jose
Individual foil	Samuel Elijah Robson; Singapore	Sammuel Tranquilan; Philippines	Tristan Cheng; Malaysia
Individual foil	Samuel Elijah Robson; Singapore	Sammuel Tranquilan; Philippines	Hans Yoong; Malaysia
Team foil	Vietnam; Cao Minh Duyệt; Nguyễn Minh Quang; Nguyễn Văn Hải; Phạm Quốc Tài	Singapore; Zephaniah Ian Kiew; Max Neo; Samuel Elijah Robson; Lionel Wee	Malaysia; Tristan Cheng; Goh Wen Hao; Kaerlan Kamalanathan; Hans Yoong
Team foil	Vietnam; Cao Minh Duyệt; Nguyễn Minh Quang; Nguyễn Văn Hải; Phạm Quốc Tài	Singapore; Zephaniah Ian Kiew; Max Neo; Samuel Elijah Robson; Lionel Wee	Philippines; Prince John Felipe; Shawn Felipe; Nathaniel Perez; Sammuel Tranquilan
Individual sabre	Voragun Srinualnad; Thailand	Vũ Thành An; Vietnam	Nguyễn Văn Quyết; Vietnam
Individual sabre	Voragun Srinualnad; Thailand	Vũ Thành An; Vietnam	Dan Wei Zuo; Singapore
Team sabre	Vietnam; Nguyễn Văn Quyết; Nguyễn Xuân Lợi; Tô Đức Anh; Vũ Thành An	Singapore; Dan Wei Zuo; Lucius Loh; Nicholas Loo; Jorelle See	Indonesia; Muhammad Irfandi Nurkamil; Ricky Dishullimah; Dita Afriadi
Team sabre	Vietnam; Nguyễn Văn Quyết; Nguyễn Xuân Lợi; Tô Đức Anh; Vũ Thành An	Singapore; Dan Wei Zuo; Lucius Loh; Nicholas Loo; Jorelle See	Thailand; Voragun Srinualnad; Chinnawat Tamniyom; Kanisorn Pangmoon; Panachai Wiriyatangsakul

=== Women ===
Event	Gold	Silver	Bronze
Individual épée	Elle Koh Meihui; Singapore	Vũ Thị Hồng; Vietnam	Kiria Tikanah; Singapore
Individual épée	Elle Koh Meihui; Singapore	Vũ Thị Hồng; Vietnam	Ivy Claire Dinoy; Philippines
Team épée	Singapore; Elle Koh Meihui; Filzah Hidayah Nor Anuar; Kiria Tikanah; Rebecca Ong	Philippines; Hanniel Abella; Ivy Claire Dinoy; Alexa Larrazabal; Andrea Matias	Thailand; Sasiporn Poonket; Korawan Thanee; Pacharaporn Vasanasomsithi; Warisa Winya
Team épée	Singapore; Elle Koh Meihui; Filzah Hidayah Nor Anuar; Kiria Tikanah; Rebecca Ong	Philippines; Hanniel Abella; Ivy Claire Dinoy; Alexa Larrazabal; Andrea Matias	Vietnam; Nguyễn Phương Kim; Nguyễn Thị Kiều Oanh; Phạm Huyền Trang; Vũ Thị Hồng
Individual foil	Maxine Wong; Singapore	Samantha Catantan; Philippines	Kemei Cheung; Singapore
Individual foil	Maxine Wong; Singapore	Samantha Catantan; Philippines	Surayya Rizzal; Malaysia
Team foil	Singapore; Kemei Cheung; Tiffany Seet; Tay Yu Ling; Maxine Wong	Vietnam; Hà Thị Vân Anh; Lưu Thị Thanh Nhàn; Nguyễn Thị Thu Phương; Phạm Thị Ngọc Luyên	Thailand; Sasinpat Doungpattra; Naramol Longthong; Chayanutphat Shinnakerdchoke; Ploypailin Thongchampa
Team foil	Singapore; Kemei Cheung; Tiffany Seet; Tay Yu Ling; Maxine Wong	Vietnam; Hà Thị Vân Anh; Lưu Thị Thanh Nhàn; Nguyễn Thị Thu Phương; Phạm Thị Ngọc Luyên	Philippines; Janna Catantan; Samantha Catantan; Maricar Matienzo; Justine Gail Tinio
Individual sabre	Juliet Heng; Singapore	Jessica Ong; Singapore	Jylyn Nicanor; Philippines
Individual sabre	Juliet Heng; Singapore	Jessica Ong; Singapore	Chhay Linly; Cambodia
Team sabre	Vietnam; Bùi Thị Thu Hà; Lê Minh Hằng; Phạm Thị Thu Hoài; Phùng Thị Khánh Linh	Philippines; Allaine Cortey; Queen Dalmacio; Jylyn Nicanor; Andrea Sayson	Singapore; Juliet Heng; Jean Koh; Jessica Ong; Nicole Sher
Team sabre	Vietnam; Bùi Thị Thu Hà; Lê Minh Hằng; Phạm Thị Thu Hoài; Phùng Thị Khánh Linh	Philippines; Allaine Cortey; Queen Dalmacio; Jylyn Nicanor; Andrea Sayson	Cambodia; Chhay Linly; Pen Narita; Sorn Nich; Yi Liza
