= Tinio =

Tinio is a surname. Notable people with the surname include:

- Antonio Tinio, Filipino educator and activist
- Justine Gail Tinio (born 1995), Filipino fencer
- Manuel Tinio (1877–1924), Filipino revolutionary
- Rolando Tinio (1937–1997), Filipino writer
