= Fencing at the 2015 SEA Games – Women's team foil =

Fencing – Women's team foil at the 2015 SEA Games
- Venue: OCBC Arena Hall 2
- Date: 6 June 2015
- Competitors: 28 from 7 nations

Medalists
| gold medal | Wang Wenying; Wong Cheryl Ye Han; Wong Nicole Mae Hui Shan; Wong Ye Ying Liane | Singapore |
| silver medal | Đỗ Thị Anh; Lê Thị Bích; Lưu Thị Thanh Nhàn; Nguyễn Thị Hoài Thu | Vietnam |
| bronze medal | Lozada Wilhelmina; Pangilinan Keren; Tinio Justine Gail; Estimada Anna Gabriella | Philippines |
| bronze medal | Flodesa Flodesa; Pua Chintya Amreiny; Purnamawati Herlin Erviana; Rihandini Verdiana | Indonesia |

The women's team foil competition of the fencing event at the 2015 SEA Games is being held on 6 June 2015 at the OCBC Arena Hall 2 in Kallang, Singapore.

== Schedule ==
| Date | Time | Round |
|---|---|---|
| Saturday, 6 June 2015 | 13:00 | Quarterfinals |
| Saturday, 6 June 2015 | 16:15 | Semifinals |
| Saturday, 6 June 2015 | 18:45 | Gold medal match |

== Results ==
Quarterfinal; 6 June 13:00
Singapore (SIN)
Bye
Malaysia (MAS) | 32
Philippines (PHI) | 45
Thailand (THA) | 43
Indonesia (INA) | 45
Myanmar (MYA) | 25
Vietnam (VIE) | 45

Semifinal; 6 June 16:15
Singapore (SIN) | 36
Philippines (PHI) | 28
Indonesia (INA) | 28
Vietnam (VIE) | 41

Gold medal match 6 June 18:45
Singapore (SIN) | 45
Vietnam (VIE) | 26

== Final standing ==
| Rank | Team |
Finals
| 1st place, gold medalist(s) | Singapore (SIN); Wang Wenying; Wong Cheryl Ye Han; Wong Nicole Mae Hui Shan; Wong Ye Ying Liane |
| 2nd place, silver medalist(s) | Vietnam (VIE); Đỗ Thị Anh; Lê Thị Bích; Lưu Thị Thanh Nhàn; Nguyễn Thị Hoài Thu |
| 3rd place, bronze medalist(s) | Philippines (PHI); Lozada Wilhelmina; Pangilinan Keren; Tinio Justine Gail; Estimada Anna Gabriella |
| 3rd place, bronze medalist(s) | Indonesia (INA); Flodesa Flodesa; Pua Chintya Amreiny; Purnamawati Herlin Erviana; Rihandini Verdiana |
Quarterfinals
| 5 | Thailand (THA); Chantasuvannasin Nunta; Limvattana Chidchanok; Nateethorn Sirithorn; Phimkaeo Nuanchan |
| 6 | Malaysia (MAS); Ab Hamid Shaidatul Shafiqah; Abu Bakar Natasha Ezzra; Cheah Ivy Hsiao Yong; Fong Tyanne |
| 7 | Myanmar (MYA); Aung Phyu Phyu; Kyaw May Tinzar; Naing Aye Chan Htet; Naing Nyo Me |
