= Athletics at the 2015 SEA Games – Women's 20 kilometres walk =

Women's 20 kilometres walk at the 2015 SEA Games
- Venue: East Coast Park
- Dates: June 6, 2015
- Competitors: 6 from 4 nations

Medalists
gold medal	Nguyen Thi Thanh Phuc	Vietnam
silver medal	Soe Than Than	Myanmar
bronze medal	Phan Thi Bich Ha	Vietnam

The Women's 20 Kilometres Walk event at the 2015 SEA Games was held at East Coast Park, Singapore on 6 June 2015.

== Schedule ==
All times are Singapore Standard Time (UTC+08:00)

Date	Time	Event
Saturday, 6 June 2015	16:00	Final

== Records ==
Prior to this competition, the existing world, Asian, and Southeast Asian Games records were as follows.

World Record	Elena Lashmanova (RUS)	1:25:02	London, United Kingdom	16 February 2014
Asian Record	Lu Xiuzhi (CHN)	1:25:12	Beijing, China	20 March 2015
Games Record	Lar Nwe Saw Mar (MYA)	1:35:03	Naypyidaw, Myanmar	15 December 2013

== Results ==
Rank	Athlete	Time	Notes
1st place, gold medalist(s)	Nguyen Thi Thanh Phuc (VIE)	1:45:20	
2nd place, silver medalist(s)	Soe Than Than (MYA)	1:46:57	PB
3rd place, bronze medalist(s)	Phan Thi Bich Ha (VIE)	1:48:23	
4	Elena Goh Ling Yi (MAS)	1:51:26	
5	Tun Kay Khaing Myo (MYA)	1:51:50	
6	Tin Shu Min (SIN)	2:02:44	
