= Vietnam at the 2015 SEA Games =

Vietnam at the 2015 Southeast Asian Games
- IOC code: VIE
- NOC: Vietnam Olympic Committee
- Website: www.voc.org.vn (in Vietnamese and English)

in Singapore
- Competitors: 382 in 28 sports
- Flag bearer: Hoang Quy Phuoc (Swimming)
- Officials: 578 (400 athletes and 178 officials)
- Medals Ranked 3rd: Gold 73 Silver 52 Bronze 60 Total 185

Southeast Asian Games appearances (overview)
- 1989; 1991; 1993; 1995; 1997; 1999; 2001; 2003; 2005; 2007; 2009; 2011; 2013; 2015; 2017; 2019; 2021; 2023; 2025; 2027; 2029

Vietnam competed in the 2015 Southeast Asian Games from 5 to 16 June 2015.

== Competitors ==
Sport	Men	Women	Total
Diving	3	4	7
Swimming	4	4	8
Synchronised swimming	0	4	4
Archery	8	8	16
Athletics	22	26	48
Badminton	7	5	12
Basketball	11	12	23
Billiards and snooker	10	2	12
Bowling	5	4	9
Boxing	6	4	10
Canoeing	5	6	11
Cycling	6	2	8
Fencing	12	12	24
Football	20	0	20
Golf	2	3	5
Gymnastics–Artistic	6	4	10
Gymnastics–Rhythmic	0	2	2
Judo	5	5	10
Pencak silat	10	6	16
Pétanque	4	4	8
Rowing	10	9	19
Sepak takraw	0	8	8
Shooting	11	11	22
Table tennis	5	5	10
Taekwondo	7	7	14
Tennis	4	5	9
Volleyball	12	11	23
Wushu	8	6	14
Others	7	2	9
Total	210	181	391

== Medal summary ==
=== Medal by sport ===
Medals by sport
Sport	1st place, gold medalist(s)	2nd place, silver medalist(s)	3rd place, bronze medalist(s)	Total
Aquatics-Diving	0	0	1	1
Aquatics-Swimming	10	2	4	16
Archery	2	1	2	5
Athletics	11	15	8	34
Badminton	0	0	1	1
Billiards and snooker	1	3	3	7
Boxing	3	1	2	6
Canoeing	1	0	4	5
Cycling	1	3	1	5
Fencing	8	2	1	11
Football	0	0	1	1
Gymnastics-Artistic	9	4	4	17
Judo	2	0	6	8
Pencak silat	3	5	2	10
Pétanque	1	2	4	7
Rowing	8	4	1	13
Sepaktakraw	0	0	2	2
Shooting	4	1	5	10
Table tennis	0	1	5	6
Taekwondo	5	3	0	8
Volleyball	0	2	0	2
Wushu	4	4	3	11
Total	73	53	60	186

=== Medal by date ===
Medals by date
Day	Date	1st place, gold medalist(s)	2nd place, silver medalist(s)	3rd place, bronze medalist(s)	Total
–3	2 June	0	0	1	1
–2	3 June	2	0	2	4
–1	4 June	2	1	2	5
0	5 June	0	0	0	0
1	6 June	9	2	6	17
2	7 June	8	5	9	23
3	8 June	5	5	10	20
4	9 June	7	3	8	18
5	10 June	15	7	6	28
6	11 June	9	8	6	23
7	12 June	5	10	0	15
8	13 June	3	1	3	7
9	14 June	8	9	1	18
10	15 June	0	1	4	5
11	16 June	0	1	0	1
Total		73	53	60	186

=== Medalists ===
Medal	Name	Sport	Event	Date
Gold	Nguyễn Tiến Nhật	Fencing	Men's individual épée	3 June 2015
Gold	Vũ Thành An	Fencing	Men's individual sabre	3 June 2015
Gold	Trần Thị Len	Fencing	Women's individual épée	4 June 2015
Gold	Nguyễn Thị Lệ Dung	Fencing	Women's individual sabre	4 June 2015
Gold	Team: Nguyễn Phước Đến; Nguyen Tien Nhat; Nguyen Van Thang; Pham Hung Vuong	Fencing	Men's team épée	6 June 2015
Gold	Team: Bùi Văn Tài; Nguyễn Văn Lợi; Tô Đức Anh; Vũ Thành An	Fencing	Men's team sabre	6 June 2015
Gold	Men's team	Gymnastics Artistics	Men's team	6 June 2015
Gold	Thi Thanh Thuy Nguyen	Judo	Women's 52 kg	6 June 2015
Gold	Nguyễn Thị Thanh Phúc	Athletics	Women's 20 kilometres walk	6 June 2015
Gold	Men's team	Fencing	Men's team épée	6 June 2015
Gold	Hoàng Quý Phước	Swimming	Men's 200m freestyle	6 June 2015
Gold	Nguyễn Thị Ánh Viên	Swimming	Women's 800m freestyle	6 June 2015
Gold	Nguyễn Thị Thi	Pétanque	Women's shooting	6 June 2015
Gold	Nguyễn Thị Thanh Thủy	Judo	Women's 52 kg	6 June 2015
Gold	Nguyễn Thị Ánh Viên	Swimming	Women's 400 I.M	6 June 2015
Gold	Men's team	Fencing	Men's team sabre	6 June 2015
Silver	Nguyễn Minh Quang	Fencing	Men's individual foil	4 June 2015
Bronze	Nguyễn Thị Hoài Thu	Fencing	Women's individual foil	3 June 2015
Bronze	Team: Trần Tuấn Quỳnh; Nguyễn Anh Tú	Table tennis	Men's doubles	2 June 2015
Bronze	Team: Đinh Quang Linh; Mai Hoàng Mỹ Trang	Table tennis	Mixed doubles	3 June 2015

=== Multiple medalists ===
Name	Sport	Gold	Silver	Bronze	Total
Nguyễn Thị Ánh Viên	Swimming	8	1	1	10
Đinh Phương Thành	Gymnastics	4	0	0	4
Phan Thị Hà Thanh	Gymnastics	3	0	1	4
Nguyễn Thị Huyền	Athletics	3	0	0	3
Dương Văn Thái	Athletics	2	0	0	2
Đỗ Thị Thảo	Athletics	2	0	0	2
Dương Thúy Vi	Wushu	1	1	1	3
Trần Xuân Hiệp	Wushu	1	1	1	3
Hoàng Xuân Vinh	Shooting	1	0	1	2
Phạm Phước Hưng	Gymnastics	0	2	2	4
