= Yu Peng Kean =

Malaysian fencer

Personal information
- Full name: Yu Peng Kean
- Born: 8 May 1991 (age 35) Malacca, Malaysia
- Height: 175 cm (5 ft 9 in)
- Weight: 64 kg (141 lb)

Chinese name
- Traditional Chinese: 尤炳堅
- Simplified Chinese: 尤炳坚
- Hanyu Pinyin: Yóu Bǐngjiān
- Hokkien POJ: Iû Péngkian

Sport
- Country: Malaysia

Yu Peng Kean (born 8 May 1991 in Malacca, Malaysia) is a retired Malaysian fencer. At the 2012 Summer Olympics, he competed in the Men's sabre, but was defeated in the last 32 by Áron Szilágyi who went on to win gold medal in the event.

== Career ==
Yu was the second Malaysian fencer to qualify for the Olympics, following Ronnie Theseira who competed at the 1964 Summer Olympics.

Yu suffered a knee injury at the 2011 Southeast Asian Games (SEA Games) in Jakarta, with which he struggled for the remainder of his career. Following the 2012 Summer Olympics, he underwent anterior cruciate ligament reconstruction on both legs. He took bronze at the 2015 SEA Games after being defeated by Vũ Thành An of Vietnam, but re-injured his knee. He underwent surgery again, and planned to compete at the 2017 SEA Games with hopes of winning a silver or gold medal, but the condition of his knee continued to worsen, and he announced his retirement from fencing in February 2017.

In 2020, Yu founded the Valor Fencing Academy in Kuala Lumpur. He came out of retirement briefly in 2022 to compete at the delayed 2021 SEA Games. As the Malaysian team had no other sabre fencers at the time, he did not have a training partner before the games, and suffered four back-to-back defeats, thus failing to advance to the semi-finals. Three of Yu's students represented Malaysia at the 2023 SEA Games in Phnom Penh: Teh Zi Hao, Keane Leong, and Resha Shaveena Sabaratnam.

== Personal life ==
Yu graduated from Universiti Putra Malaysia with a bachelor of science in human resource development in 2016. In December 2018, he married fellow Malaysian Olympian Leung Chii Lin. The couple's first child, a daughter, was born in September 2020.
