= Fu Yiting =

Chinese fencer (born 1996)

Personal information
- Nationality: Chinese
- Born: 27 January 1996 (age 30)

Sport
- Sport: Fencing
Medal record
Women's fencing
Representing China
Asian Games
Silver medal – second place	2018 Jakarta	Individual foil
Silver medal – second place	2018 Jakarta	Team foil
World University Games
Gold medal – first place	2021 Chengdu	Team

Fu Yiting (Chinese: 傅依婷; pinyin: Fù Yītíng; born 27 January 1996) is a Chinese fencer. She competed in the women's individual foil event at the 2018 Asian Games, winning the silver medal.
