= Fencing at the 2015 SEA Games – Women's foil =

Fencing – Women's foil at the 2015 SEA Games
- Venue: OCBC Arena Hall 2
- Date: 3 June 2015
- Competitors: 16 from 8 nations

The women's foil competition of the fencing events at the 2015 SEA Games is being held on 3 June 2015 at the OCBC Arena Hall 2 in Kallang, Singapore.

== Schedule ==
Date	Time	Round
Wednesday, 3 June 2015	9:30	Round of Pools
Wednesday, 3 June 2015	14:45	Round of 16
Wednesday, 3 June 2015	15:55	Quarterfinals
Wednesday, 3 June 2015	17:40	Semifinals
Wednesday, 3 June 2015	19:20	Final

== Results ==
=== Pool round ===
Rank	Athlete	W	L	W/M	TD	TF
1	Đỗ Thị Ánh (VIE)	5	0	1.000	+18	25
2	Nunta Chantasuvannasin (THA)	4	0	1.000	+18	20
3	Wang Wenying (SIN)	4	1	0.800	+12	22
4	Nguyễn Thị Hoài Thư (VIE)	3	1	0.750	+10	19
5	Nicole Mae Hui Shan Wong (SIN)	3	1	0.750	+10	17
6	Natasha Ezzra Abu Bakar (MAS)	3	1	0.750	+4	16
7	Chintya Amreiny Pua (INA)	3	2	0.600	–1	16
8	Justine Gail Tinio (PHI)	2	2	0.500	–1	16
9	May Tinzar Kyaw (MYA)	2	2	0.500	–3	10
10	Chidchanok Limvattana (THA)	1	3	0.250	–4	15
11	Ivy Hsiao Yong Cheah (MAS)	1	3	0.250	–6	9
12	Verdiana Rihandini (INA)	1	3	0.250	–9	10
13	Wilhelmina Lozada (PHI)	1	4	0.200	–4	15
14	Phyu Phyu Aung (MYA)	1	4	0.200	–7	16
15	Aleeny Xayalath (LAO)	1	4	0.200	–18	6
16	Koungking Bouddaxay (LAO)	0	4	0.000	–19	1

=== Knockout round ===
Round of 16; 3 June 14:45
Đỗ (VIE)
Bye
Kyaw (MYA)	13
Tinio (PHI)	15
Wong (SIN)	15
Rihandini (INA)	9
Bye
Hoài Thư (VIE)
Wenying (SIN)
Bye
Cheah (MAS)	6
Abu Bakar (MAS)	15
Pua (INA)	15
Limvattana (THA)	13
Bye
Chantasuvannasin (THA)

Quarterfinal; 3 June 15:55
Đỗ (VIE)	11
Tinio (PHI)	15
Wong (SIN)	6
Hoài Thư (VIE)	15
Wenying (SIN)	15
Abu Bakar (MAS)	14
Pua (INA)	13
Chantasuvannasin (THA)	14

Semifinal; 3 June 17:40
Tinio (PHI)	15
Hoài Thư (VIE)	6
Wenying (SIN)	15
Chantasuvannasin (THA)	9

Gold medal match 3 June 19:20
Tinio (PHI)	7
Wenying (SIN)	15

== Final standing ==
Rank	Athlete
1st place, gold medalist(s)	Wang Wenying (SIN)
2nd place, silver medalist(s)	Justine Gail Tinio (PHI)
3rd place, bronze medalist(s)	Nguyễn Thị Hoài Thư (VIE)
3rd place, bronze medalist(s)	Chantasuvannasin Nunta (THA)
