= Women's team foil at the 2011 World Fencing Championships =

The Women's team foil event of the 2011 World Fencing Championships took place on October 14, 2011.

== Medalists ==
1st place, gold medalist(s)	Russia; Inna Deriglazova; Aida Shanayeva; Larisa Korobeynikova; Yevgeniya Lamonova
2nd place, silver medalist(s)	Italy; Arianna Errigo; Valentina Vezzali; Elisa Di Francisca; Ilaria Salvatori
3rd place, bronze medalist(s)	South Korea; Lee Hye-Sun; Nam Hyun-Hee; Jeon Hee-Sook; Jung Gil-Ok

== Draw ==
=== Finals ===
Semifinals
Italy	45
Poland	31
South Korea	25
Russia	45

Final
Italy	44
Russia	45
Third place
Poland	26
South Korea	27

=== Top half ===
Round of 32
Italy
Bye
Mexico	40
Egypt	37
Japan
Bye
Bye
Hungary
Germany
Bye
Algeria	21
Canada	45
United Kingdom	45
Puerto Rico	16
Bye
Poland

Round of 16
Italy	45
Mexico	14
Japan	28
Hungary	34
Germany	36
Canada	37
United Kingdom	16
Poland	34

Quarterfinals
Italy	45
Hungary	30
Canada	23
Poland	35

Semifinals
Italy	45
Poland	31

=== Bottom half ===
Round of 32
South Korea
Bye
Brazil	42
Singapore	36
Ukraine	45
Bulgaria	9
Bye
United States
France
Bye
Bye
China
Hong Kong	32
Venezuela	45
Bye
Russia

Round of 16
South Korea	45
Brazil	20
Ukraine	28
United States	45
France	29
China	25
Venezuela	18
Russia	45

Quarterfinals
South Korea	44
United States	34
France	42
Russia	45

Semifinals
South Korea	25
Russia	45

=== Placement matches ===
==== 5–8th place ====
5–8th place semifinals
Hungary	45
Canada	21
United States	39
France	45

Fifth place
Hungary	44
France	43
Seventh place
Canada	31
United States	45

==== 9–12th place ====
9–16th place quarterfinals
Mexico	27
Japan	41
Germany	45
United Kingdom	34
Brazil	25
Ukraine	45
China	34
Venezuela	38

9–12th place semifinals
Japan	30
Germany	37
Ukraine	45
Venezuela	26

Ninth place
Germany	41
Ukraine	35
11th place
Japan	45
Venezuela	22

==== 13–16th place ====
13–16th place semifinals
Mexico	22
United Kingdom	38
Brazil	20
China	45

13th place
United Kingdom	16
China	30
15th place
Mexico	45
Brazil	43
