= Fencing at the 2021 SEA Games =

- Venue: Hanoi Indoor Games Gymnasium
- Location: Hanoi, Vietnam
- Dates: 13–18 May 2022

Fencing competitions at the 2021 SEA Games took place at Hanoi Indoor Games Gymnasium in Hanoi, Vietnam from 13 to 18 May 2022.

== Summary ==
Singapore emerged as the best nation in this event again, winning six out of 12 available gold medals and in total 15 medals. Host Vietnam came in second with 5 gold medals and in total 11 medals.

== Medal table ==
* Host nation (Vietnam)

Rank	Nation	Gold	Silver	Bronze	Total
1	Singapore	6	4	5	15
2	Vietnam*	5	1	5	11
3	Philippines	1	3	4	8
4	Thailand	0	3	7	10
5	Malaysia	0	1	3	4
Totals (5 entries)		12	12	24	48

== Medalists ==
=== Men ===
Event	Gold	Silver	Bronze
Individual épée	Nguyễn Tiến Nhật; Vietnam	Jose Garcia Noelito Jr. Philippines	Koh I Jie; Malaysia
Individual épée	Nguyễn Tiến Nhật; Vietnam	Jose Garcia Noelito Jr. Philippines	Simon Renjie Lee; Singapore
Team épée	Singapore; Jian Tong Si To; Simon Renjie Lee; Mun Hou Samson Lee; Elliot Yi Heng Han	Vietnam; Nguyễn Phước Đến; Trần Út Ngọc; Đặng Tuấn Anh; Nguyễn Tiến Nhật	Malaysia; I Jie Koh; Mohamad Roslan Mohamed; Isaac Seet Kai Xuan; Kelvyn Mancheng Kok
Team épée	Singapore; Jian Tong Si To; Simon Renjie Lee; Mun Hou Samson Lee; Elliot Yi Heng Han	Vietnam; Nguyễn Phước Đến; Trần Út Ngọc; Đặng Tuấn Anh; Nguyễn Tiến Nhật	Thailand; Nattiphong Singkham; Chinnaphat Chaloemchanen; Korakote Juengamnuaychai
Individual foil	Jonathan Au Eong; Singapore	Nathaniel Perez; Philippines	Hans Yoong; Malaysia
Individual foil	Jonathan Au Eong; Singapore	Nathaniel Perez; Philippines	Nguyễn Minh Quang; Vietnam
Team foil	Singapore; Kieren Hoy-In Lock; Tian Wei Jonathan Au Eong; Matthew James Quan Rong Lim; Joel Ka Jyn Chiu	Malaysia; Hans Wei Shen Yoong; Xing Han Cheng; Hong Li Chong; Kaerlan Vinod Kamalanathan	Philippines; Nathaniel Perez Mangubat; Sammuel Tranquilan Lopez; Michael Nicanor Porto; Prince John Francis S. Felipe Santos
Team foil	Singapore; Kieren Hoy-In Lock; Tian Wei Jonathan Au Eong; Matthew James Quan Rong Lim; Joel Ka Jyn Chiu	Malaysia; Hans Wei Shen Yoong; Xing Han Cheng; Hong Li Chong; Kaerlan Vinod Kamalanathan	Thailand; Phatthanaphong Srisawat; Sitsadipat Doungpatra; Notethakod Wangpaisit
Individual sabre	Vũ Thành An; Vietnam	Voragun Srinualnad; Thailand	Ruangrit Haekerd; Thailand
Individual sabre	Vũ Thành An; Vietnam	Voragun Srinualnad; Thailand	Chan Phu Xien; Singapore
Team sabre	Vietnam; Nguyễn Văn Quyết; Nguyễn Xuân Lợi; Tô Đức Anh; Vũ Thành An	Thailand; Ruangrit Haekerd; Voragun Srinualnad; Panachai Wiriyatangsakul	Philippines; Sandro Antonio Sia; Eunice Villanueva; John Paul Dayro; Christian Concepcion
Team sabre	Vietnam; Nguyễn Văn Quyết; Nguyễn Xuân Lợi; Tô Đức Anh; Vũ Thành An	Thailand; Ruangrit Haekerd; Voragun Srinualnad; Panachai Wiriyatangsakul	Singapore; Choy Yu Yong; Chan Phu Xien; Dan Wei Zuo; Jorelle See

=== Women ===
Event	Gold	Silver	Bronze
Individual épée	Elle Koh; Singapore	Kiria Tikanah; Singapore	Korawan Thanee; Thailand
Individual épée	Elle Koh; Singapore	Kiria Tikanah; Singapore	Vũ Thị Hồng; Vietnam
Team épée	Singapore; Kiria Tikanah; Elle Koh; Victoria Lim; Rebecca Ong	Thailand; Kanyapat Meechai; Korawan Thanee; Pacharaporn Vasanasomsithi	Philippines; Justine Gail Tinio; Wilhelmina Lozada; Anna Gabriella Guinto; Ivy Claire Dinoy
Team épée	Singapore; Kiria Tikanah; Elle Koh; Victoria Lim; Rebecca Ong	Thailand; Kanyapat Meechai; Korawan Thanee; Pacharaporn Vasanasomsithi	Vietnam; Nguyễn Phương Kim; Vũ Thị Hồng; Nguyễn Thị Trang; Nguyễn Thị Kiều Oanh
Individual foil	Samantha Catantan; Philippines	Maxine Wong; Singapore	Kemei Cheung; Singapore
Individual foil	Samantha Catantan; Philippines	Maxine Wong; Singapore	Chayanutphat Shinnakerdchoke; Thailand
Team foil	Singapore; Maxine Wong; Cheung Kemei; Chloe Ng; Denyse Chan	Philippines; Samantha Catantan; Maxine Esteban; Wilhelmina Lozada; Justine Gail Tinio	Thailand; Chayanutphat Shinnakerdchoke; Chayada Smithisukul; Sasinpat Doungpattra
Team foil	Singapore; Maxine Wong; Cheung Kemei; Chloe Ng; Denyse Chan	Philippines; Samantha Catantan; Maxine Esteban; Wilhelmina Lozada; Justine Gail Tinio	Vietnam; Đỗ Thị Anh; Nguyễn Thị Thu Phương; Lưu Thị Thanh Nhàn; Nguyễn Thị Thu Phương
Individual sabre	Bùi Thị Thu Hà; Vietnam	Jessica Ong; Singapore	Jolie Lee; Singapore
Individual sabre	Bùi Thị Thu Hà; Vietnam	Jessica Ong; Singapore	Phùng Thị Khánh Linh; Vietnam
Team sabre	Vietnam; Phùng Thị Khánh Linh; Bùi Thị Thu Hà; Phạm Thị Thu Hoài; Đỗ Thị Tâm	Singapore; Jolie Lee; Lee Kar Moon; Nicole Wee; Jessica Ong	Philippines; Jylyn Nicanor Porto; Queen Denise Dalmacio Geroche; Allaine Nicole Cortey Palomo; Kemberly Camahalan Catacutan
Team sabre	Vietnam; Phùng Thị Khánh Linh; Bùi Thị Thu Hà; Phạm Thị Thu Hoài; Đỗ Thị Tâm	Singapore; Jolie Lee; Lee Kar Moon; Nicole Wee; Jessica Ong	Thailand; Tonkhaw Phokaew; Bandhita Srinualnad; Onwipha Innurak
