= Karin Miyawaki =

Japanese fencer (born 1997)

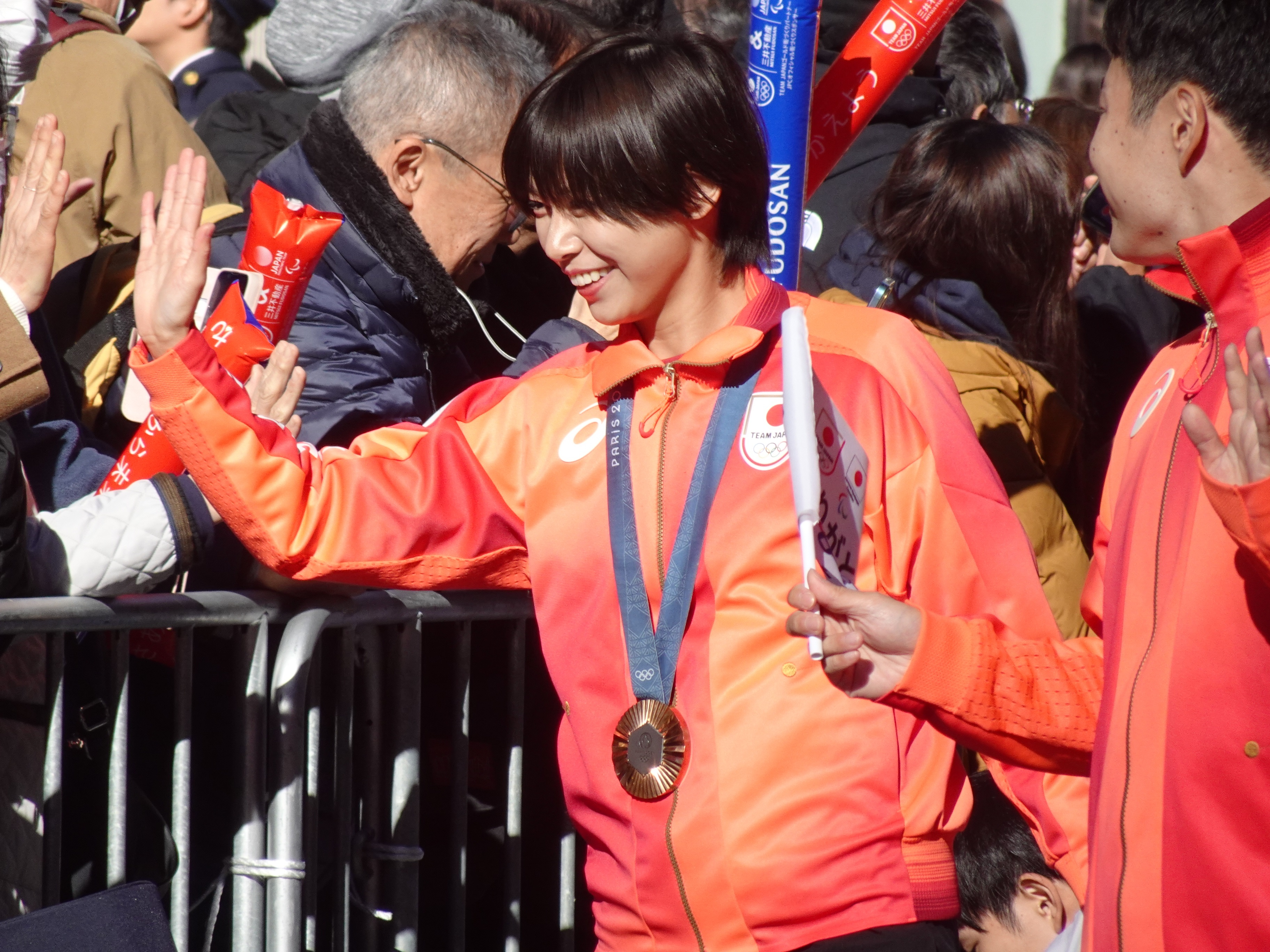
- Miyawaki at Paris 2024 Summer Olympians and Paralympians Japan National Team parade event on November 30th, 2024

Personal information
- Born: 4 February 1997 (age 29) Tokyo, Japan

Fencing career
- Sport: Fencing
- Country: Japan
- Weapon: Foil
- Hand: Right-handed
- FIE ranking: current ranking
Medal record
Women's foil
Representing Japan
Olympic Games
| Bronze medal – third place | 2024 Paris | Team |
World Championships
| Bronze medal – third place | 2023 Milan | Team |
Asian Games
| Gold medal – first place | 2018 Jakarta | Team |
| Bronze medal – third place | 2014 Incheon | Team |
| Bronze medal – third place | 2022 Hangzhou | Team |
Asian Fencing Championships
| Gold medal – first place | 2024 Kuwait City | Team |
Summer Youth Olympics
| Gold medal – first place | 2014 Nanjing | Mixed team |
| Silver medal – second place | 2014 Nanjing | Individual |

Karin Miyawaki (宮脇 花綸, Miyawaki Karin; born 4 February 1997) is a Japanese fencer. She has won medals at several editions of the Asian Fencing Championships and, in 2014, she won one of the bronze medals in the women's team foil event at the 2014 Asian Games held in Incheon, South Korea.

== Career ==
In 2014, she won the silver medal in the girl's foil event at the Summer Youth Olympics held in Nanjing, China. She also won the gold medal in the mixed team event. In 2018, she was eliminated in her first match in the women's foil event at the World Fencing Championships held in Wuxi, China. In the same year, she won the gold medal in the women's team foil event at the 2018 Asian Games held in Indonesia. She also competed in the women's individual foil event without winning a medal.

She competed at the 2022 World Fencing Championships held in Cairo, Egypt. At the 2024 Summer Olympics, Miyawaki won the bronze medal in the women's team foil event, helping Japan earn its first Olympic medal in the event.

== Personal life ==
Miyawaki was interested in sports from a young age; her sister took up fencing in elementary school and Miyawaki would go with her to practice. She attended Keio Girls' High School (reportedly because "[she] wanted to go to a high school that would let [her] fence instead of making [her] study for university examinations". She subsequently majored in economics at Keio University, where she was a member of the Keio Fencing Club.

== Medal record ==
=== Olympic Games ===
| Year | Location | Event | Position |
|---|---|---|---|
| 2024 | Paris, France | Team Women's Foil | 3rd |
