= Harlene Raguin =

Filipina fencer

Personal information
- Full name: Harlene Orendain-Raguim
- Nationality: Filipino
- Born: June 14, 1983 (age 43) Pangasinan, Philippines
- Height: 177 cm (5 ft 10 in)
- Weight: 75 kg (165 lb)

Sport
- Country: Philippines
- Sport: Fencing
- Event: Épée
- College team: UST Growling Tigers
Medal record
Women's fencing
Representing Philippines
Event	1st	2nd	3rd
Southeast Asian Games	1	3	3
Total	1	3	3
Southeast Asian Games
Gold medal – first place	2019 Philippines	Team Épée
Silver medal – second place	2015 Singapore	Individual Épée
Silver medal – second place	2007 Nakhon Ratchasima	Individual Épée
Silver medal – second place	2015 Singapore	Team Épée
Bronze medal – third place	2011 Palembang	Team Épée
Bronze medal – third place	2007 Nakhon Ratchasima	Team Épée
Bronze medal – third place	2005 Manila	Team Épée

Harlene Orendain-Raguin (born June 14, 1983) is a Filipina épée fencer. She is the 2007 and 2015 Southeast Asian Games individual épée silver medalist, a 2019 team épée gold medalist, a 2015 team épée silver medalist, and a member of the bronze-winning teams at the 2005, 2007, and 2011 Southeast Asian Games.

Locally, Raguin became the women's épée champion at the 2014 Philippine National Games. During her college years, she represented the University of Santo Tomas Growling Tigers for five years from 2001 to 2005. She was named rookie of the year during the UAAP Season 65 after winning silver medals in both the individual and team épée events.
