= Samantha Catantan =

Filipino fencer (born 2002)

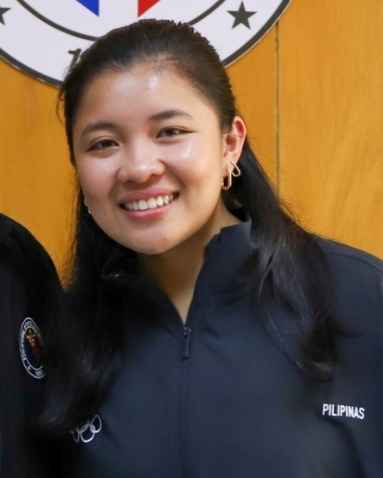
- Catantan in 2024

Personal information
- Full name: Samantha Kyle Catantan
- Born: February 1, 2002 (age 24)

Fencing career
- Sport: Fencing
- Country: Philippines
- Weapon: Foil
- Hand: Right-handed
- Years on national team: 2017–present
- FIE ranking: Current ranking
Medal record
Women's foil
Representing Philippines
Southeast Asian Games
Gold medal – first place	2021 Vietnam	Women's foil
Silver medal – second place	2023 Cambodia	Women's foil
Silver medal – second place	2021 Vietnam	Team foil
Silver medal – second place	2017 Kuala Lumpur	Women's foil
Bronze medal – third place	2019 Philippines	Women's foil
Bronze medal – third place	2019 Philippines	Team foil

Samantha Kyle Lim Catantan (born February 1, 2002) is a Filipina right-handed foil fencer. Representing the Philippines, she made her Olympic debut at the 2024 Summer Olympics in Paris, France, the first Filipino fencer at the Olympics since Barcelona 1992.

== Early life and education ==
Samantha Catantan was born on February 1, 2002 to Jon and Aileen Catantan and has three sisters.

Catantan was a product of the Quezon City Sports Enhancement Program (QCSEP) of Quezon City councilor Joseph Juico. She would first get involved in fencing under QCSEP when she was nine years old.

Catantan studied high school at the University of the East. She graduated from senior high school in November 2020.

She would then move to the United States to attend Pennsylvania State University where she would pursue a master's degree in accounting after earning a Bachelor of Accountancy degree.

== Career ==
=== High school ===
Catantan was part of the high school or junior team of the University of the East (UE). In her final year in 2020, she was named Season 82 MVP for the UE Junior Warriors. She would lead the Junior Warriors' in six of their nine straight championships. At UE, national team coach Rolando Canlas was her mentor.

=== College ===
Catantan was recruited to be a fencer of Pennsylvania State University which competes in the U.S. National Collegiate Athletic Association (NCAA). She would participate in the invitationals and would eventually fence for the Nittany Lions at the competition proper of the 2021 NCAA Fencing Championships, becoming the first homegrown Filipino to do so.

Catantan would end with a third-place trophy and an All-America selection in the women's foil. She was also named Most Valuable Player for her university's fencing team for that season.

Catantan would be eligible to compete until 2025. In 2024, she would clinch a berth in championship rounds after finishing second in the Mid-Atlantic/South Regionals.

=== National team ===
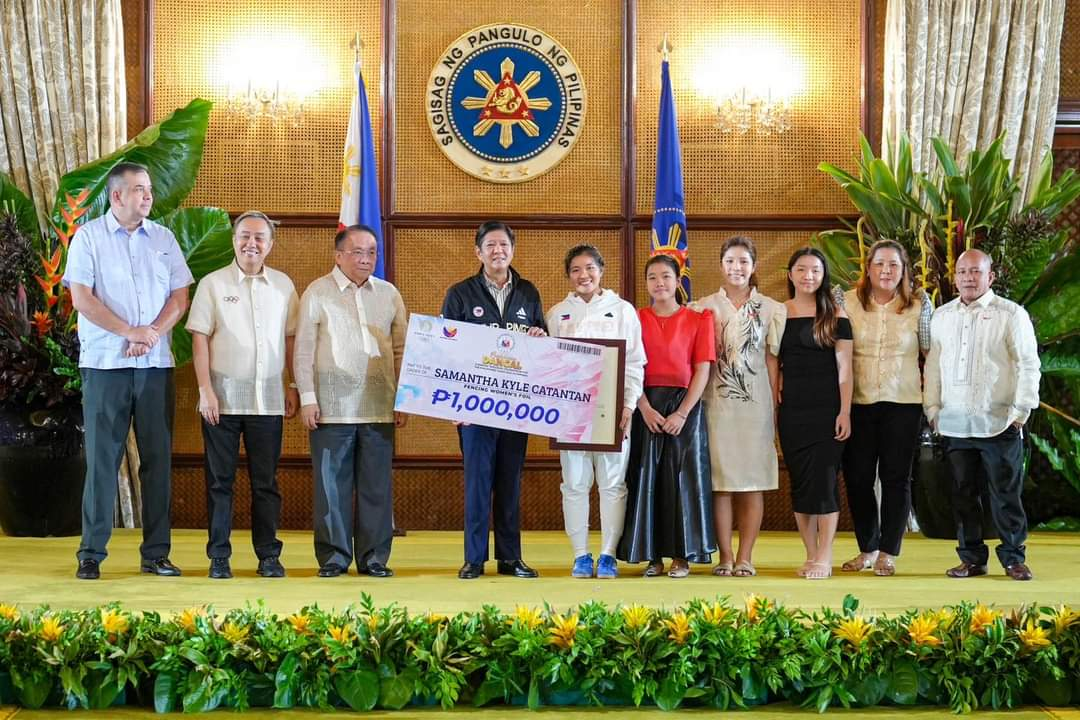
Catantan's incentive from President Bongbong Marcos for her participation at the 2024 Summer Olympics.

Catantan represents the Philippines in international competitions. She would debut for her country at age 15, when she won a silver at the 2017 SEA Games. She would compete in subsequent editions of the regional games with her best result being at the 2021 edition in Vietnam where she clinched a gold medal.

She would win a gold in the 2019 Asian Under-23 Fencing Championship in Bangkok, Thailand.

Catantan qualified for the 2024 Summer Olympics in Paris through the Asia and Oceania Zonal Qualifying Tournament despite enduring an injury in the final.

== Personal life ==
Her three sisters are fencers; two of which (Ysah and Sophia) are also part of the Philippine national team. She hails from Quezon City.

After suffering an anterior cruciate ligament injury in the 2024 Summer Olympics, she underwent a successful anterior cruciate ligament reconstruction at St. Luke's Medical Center – Global City. It was the same injury during the 2023 SEA Games.

== Medal record ==
=== SEA Games ===
Year	Location	Event	Position
2017	Kuala Lumpur, Malaysia	Individual Women's foil	2nd
2019	Pasay, Philippines	Individual Women's foil	3rd
2019	Pasay, Philippines	Team Women's foil	3rd
2021	Hanoi, Vietnam	Individual Women's foil	1st
2021	Hanoi, Vietnam	Team Women's foil	2nd
2023	Phnom Penh, Cambodia	Individual Women's foil	2nd

== See also ==
- List of Pennsylvania State University Olympians
