= Justine Gail Tinio =

Filipino foil fencer

Personal information
- Full name: Justine Gail Tinio
- Nationality: Philippines
- Born: December 23, 1995 (age 30)
- Height: 160 cm (5 ft 3 in)
- Weight: 52 kg (115 lb)

Sport
- Country: Philippines
- Sport: Fencing
- Event: Foil
Medal record
Women's fencing
Representing Philippines
Southeast Asian Games
Silver medal – second place	2021 Vietnam	Team foil
Silver medal – second place	2015 Singapore	Individual foil
Bronze medal – third place	2021 Vietnam	Team epee
Bronze medal – third place	2023 Cambodia	Team foil
Bronze medal – third place	2019 Philippines	Team foil

Justine Gail Tinio (born December 3, 1995) is a Filipina foil fencer. She is the 2015 Southeast Asian Games individual foil silver medalist, as well as a three-time team medalist in the team foil and team épée events at the 2019 and 2021 Southeast Asian Games. Tinio is also the champion of the women's individual foil event at the 2014 Philippine National Games.

As of June 2015, Tinio is a college student at the University of the East. As a representative of her college, she was named the MVP for women's fencing at the fencing championship of UAAP Season 77.
