= Oh Ha-na =

South Korean fencer (born 1985)

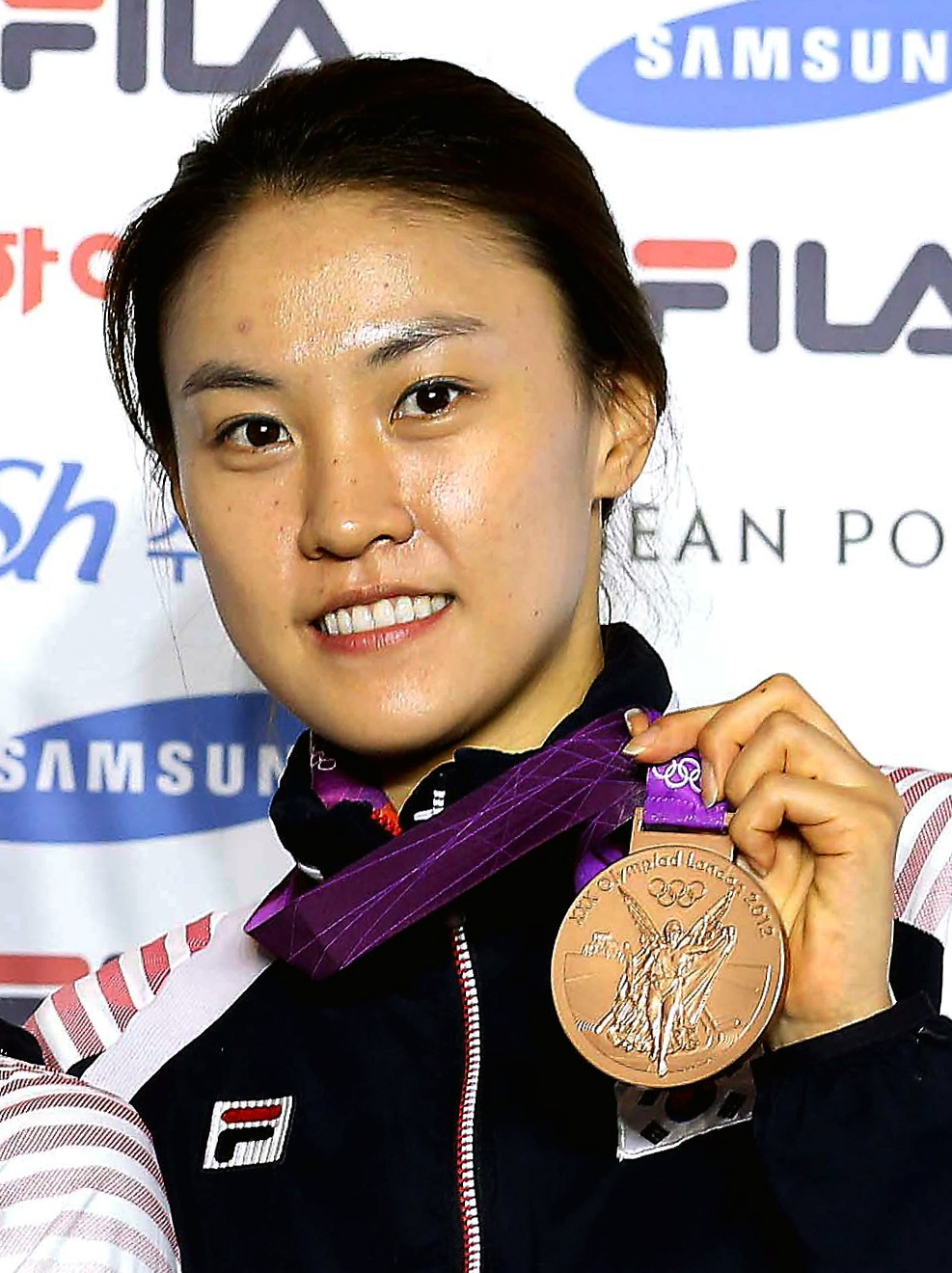

Medal record

Women's fencing

Representing South Korea

Olympic Games
Bronze medal – third place	2012 London	Team foil

World Championships
Bronze medal – third place	2010 Paris	Team foil

Asian Games
Gold medal – first place	2010 Guangzhou	Team foil

Universiade
Silver medal – second place	2003 Daegu	Team foil
Silver medal – second place	2007 Bangkok	Team foil

- Oh Ha-na
- Hangul: 오하나
- RR: O Hana
- MR: O Hana

Oh Ha-na (Korean pronunciation: [o.ɦa.na]; born January 8, 1985, in Seongnam, Gyeonggi-do) is a female fencer from South Korea. She won the bronze medal at the 2012 Summer Olympics in the Women's team foil event.
