= Ilaria Salvatori =

Italian fencer (born 1979)

Medal record

Representing Italy

Olympic Games
Gold medal – first place	2012 London	Team Foil
Bronze medal – third place	2008 Beijing	Team foil

World Championships
Silver medal – second place	2011 Catania	Team Foil

European Championships
Gold medal – first place	2012 Legnano	Team Foil

Ilaria Salvatori (born 5 February 1979 in Frascati) is an Italian foil fencer.

== Biography ==
Salvatori won a bronze medal in the foil team event at the 2008 Summer Olympics and a gold medal in the same event at the 2012 Summer Olympics.
