= Đỗ Thị Anh =

Vietnamese fencer (born 1996)

Personal information
- Born: 9 February 1996 (age 30) Hanoi, Vietnam

Sport
- Sport: Fencing

Đỗ Thị Anh (born 9 February 1996) is a Vietnamese fencer. She won silver in the women's team foil event at the 2015 Southeast Asian Games and competed in the women's foil event at the 2016 Summer Olympics.

Anh started fencing when she was 15, after learning about the sport from the manga series Ore wa Teppei.
