= Gian Franco Rodríguez =

Venezuelan actor

Gian Franco Rodríguez is a Venezuelan actor best known for playing the visual artist and window dresser Victor Hugo in the 2021 Ryan Murphy-produced Netflix television miniseries Halston. Previously he appeared in the 2018 Venezuelan film Simón and Safe.
