= Yevgeniya Lamonova =

Russian fencer

Medal record

Representing Russia

Women's Fencing

Olympic Games
| Gold medal – first place | 2008 Beijing | Foil Team |

World Championships
| Gold medal – first place | 2011 Catania | Team Foil |

European Championships
| Bronze medal – third place | 2011 Sheffield | Foil |

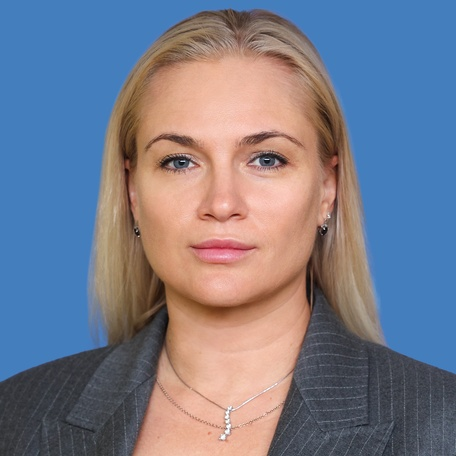
Yevgeniya Alekseyevna Lamonova

Yevgeniya Alekseyevna Lamonova (Russian: Евгения Алексеевна Ламонова) (born 9 August 1983 in Kurchatov, Russia) is a Russian foil fencer.

She won the gold medal in the foil team event at the 2008 Summer Olympics.
