= Nguyễn Thị Như Hoa =

Vietnamese fencer (born 1984)

Personal information
- Born: 21 February 1984 (age 42) Hanoi, Vietnam

Sport
- Sport: Fencing
Medal record
Women's fencing
Representing Vietnam
Southeast Asia Games
Gold medal – first place	2015 Southeast Asia Games	Team épée
Gold medal – first place	2017 Southeast Asia Games	Women épée
Bronze medal – third place	2019 Southeast Asia Games	Team épée

Nguyễn Thị Như Hoa (born 21 February 1984) is a Vietnamese fencer. She competed in the women's épée event at the 2016 Summer Olympics.
