= Liu Yan Wai =

Hong Kong fencer (born 1989)

Personal information
- Nationality: Hong Konger
- Born: 9 July 1989 (age 36)

Sport
- Sport: Fencing
Medal record
Women's fencing
Representing Hong Kong
Asian Games
Bronze medal – third place	2018 Jakarta	Individual foil

Liu Yan Wai (born 9 July 1989) is a Hong Kong fencer. She competed in the women's individual foil event at the 2018 Asian Games, winning the bronze medal.
