= Le Huilin =

Chinese fencer (born 1989)

Personal information
- Nationality: Chinese
- Born: 1 April 1989 (age 37)
- Height: 172 cm (5 ft 8 in)
- Weight: 62 kg (137 lb)

Sport
- Sport: Fencing

Le Huilin (Simplified Chinese:乐 慧琳, born 1 April 1989) is a Chinese fencer from Sha County. She competed in the women's foil event at the 2016 Summer Olympics.
