= Mona Shaito =

Lebanese-American fencer (born 1994)

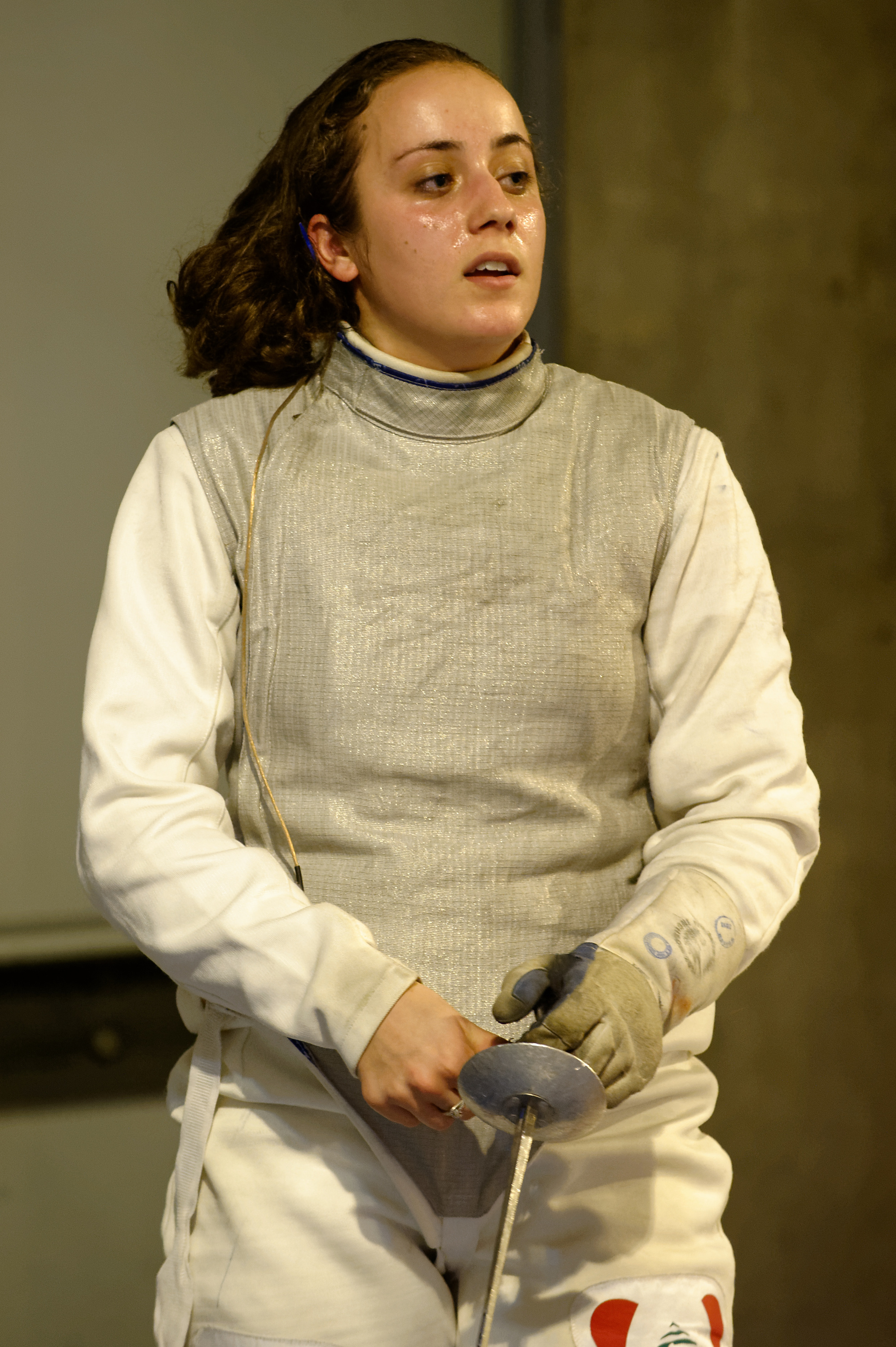

Personal information
- Born: May 12, 1994 (age 32) Dallas, Texas, United States
- Home town: Beirut, Lebanon
- Height: 1.57 m (5 ft 2 in)
- Weight: 48 kg (106 lb)

Fencing career
- Sport: Fencing
- Country: Lebanon
- Weapon: Foil
- Hand: Left
- Head coach: Volodymyr Yefimov
- FIE ranking: current ranking

Mona Shaito (Arabic: منى شعيتو) (born 12 May 1994) is a Lebanese-American fencer, who along with her brother Zain Shaito, represented Lebanon in foil at the 2012 Olympic Games. Shaito was born and raised in Texas and attended Ohio State University, and holds Lebanese-American dual citizenship.
