= Vũ Thành An =

Vietnamese fencer (born 1992)

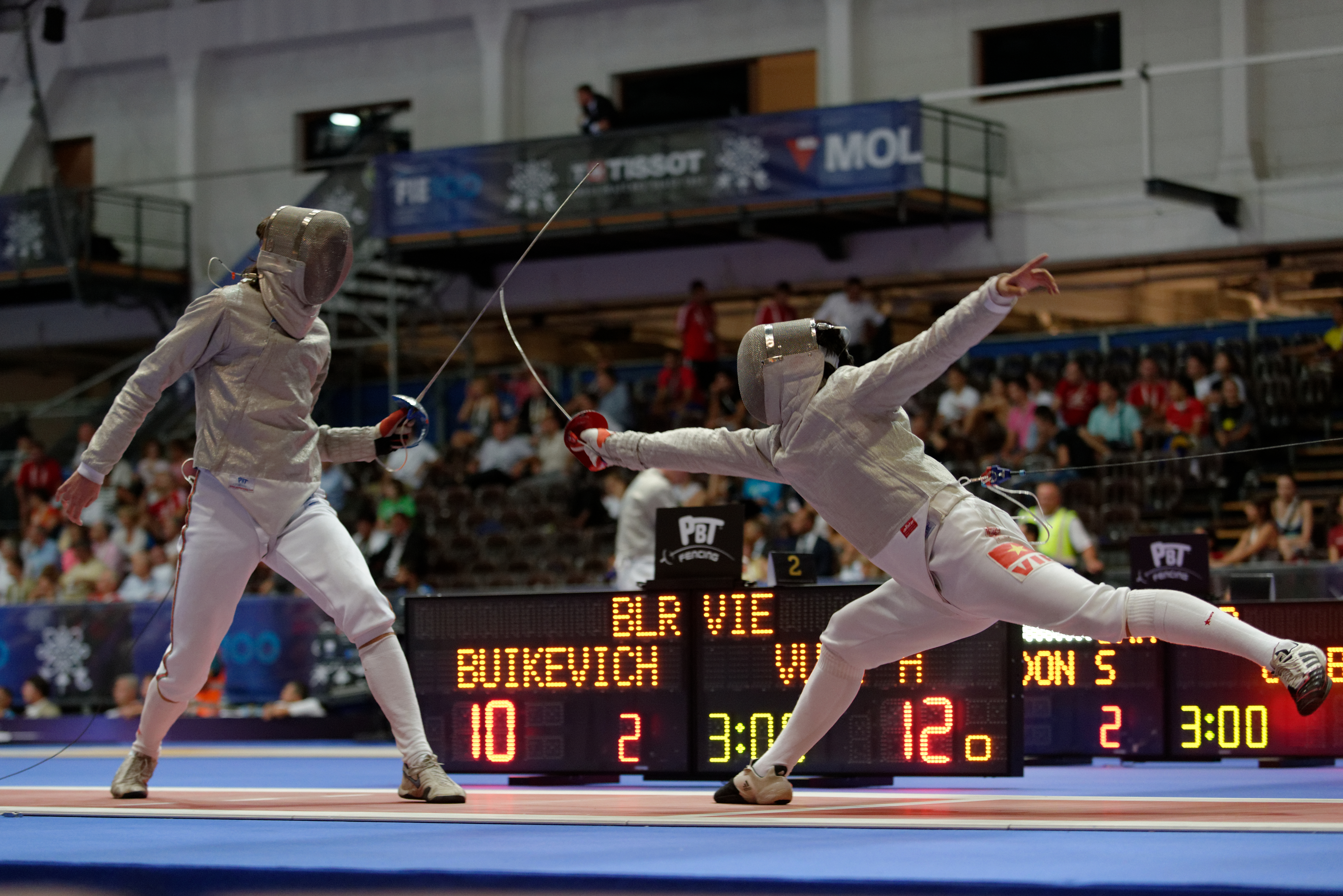
- An (right) against Aliaksandr Buikevich in 2013

Personal information
- Full name: Vũ Thành An
- Nationality: Vietnam
- Born: August 7, 1992 (age 33) Hanoi, Vietnam
- Height: 1.83 m (6 ft 0 in)
Medal record
Representing Vietnam
Men's fencing
Asian Fencing Championships
Bronze medal – third place	2016 Wuxi	Individual Sabre
Bronze medal – third place	2016 Wuxi	Team Sabre
SEA Games
Gold medal – first place	2015 Singapore	Individual Sabre
Gold medal – first place	2015 Singapore	Team Sabre
Gold medal – first place	2017 Kuala Lumpur	Individual Sabre
Gold medal – first place	2019 Philippines	Individual Sabre
Gold medal – first place	2019 Philippines	Team Sabre
Gold medal – first place	2021 Hanoi	Individual Sabre
Gold medal – first place	2021 Hanoi	Team Sabre
Gold medal – first place	2023 Phnom Penh	Team Sabre
Silver medal – second place	2011 Jakarta-Palembang	Individual Sabre
Silver medal – second place	2011 Jakarta-Palembang	Team Sabre
Silver medal – second place	2023 Phnom Penh	Individual Sabre

Vũ Thành An (born 7 August 1992) is a Vietnamese fencer. He was chosen to compete for Vietnam at the 2016 Summer Olympics in Rio de Janeiro, where he was the flag-bearer for Vietnam at the opening ceremony. At the Olympic Games in Rio, he defeated Diego Occhiuzzi of Italy in the first round of the men's sabre competition, 15-12. He was then defeated by Vincent Anstett of France in the round of 16.

Olympic Games
Preceded by Nguyễn Tiến Nhật	Flagbearer for Vietnam; Rio de Janeiro 2016	Succeeded by Incumbent
