= Nguyễn Minh Quang =

Vietnamese footballer (born 2001)

Personal information
- Full name: Nguyễn Minh Quang
- Date of birth: 3 February 2001 (age 25)
- Place of birth: Cẩm Xuyên, Hà Tĩnh, Vietnam
- Height: 1.71 m (5 ft 7 in)
- Positions: Winger; striker

Team information
- Current team: SHB Đà Nẵng
- Number: 38

Youth career
- 2018–2022: Hà Tĩnh

Senior career*
| Years | Team | Apps | (Gls) |
| 2019–2023 | Hồng Lĩnh Hà Tĩnh | 0 | (0) |
| 2019 | → Nam Định (loan) | 6 | (1) |
| 2020 | → Phù Đổng (loan) | 7 | (1) |
| 2022–2023 | → Bình Thuận (loan) | 23 | (11) |
| 2023– | SHB Đà Nẵng | 64 | (10) |

International career^{‡}
| 2023–2024 | Vietnam U23 | 12 | (1) |
Medal record
Men's football
Representing Vietnam
AFF U-23 Championship
| Winner | Thailand 2023 |
- * Club domestic league appearances and goals as of 7 June 2026 ‡ National team caps and goals as of 10 April 2024

Nguyễn Minh Quang (born 3 February 2001) is a Vietnamese professional footballer who plays as a winger or striker for V.League 1 club SHB Đà Nẵng.

== Early career ==
Minh Quang started playing football at his young age. In 2012, during a U11 football tournament organised in his hometown in Hà Tĩnh, Minh Quang showed great potential, which allowed him to join the youth team of Hà Tĩnh FC shortly after. He left Hà Tĩnh after 10 years in 2023 without having any first team appearance due to his lack of skills according to the coaches.

== Club career ==
In 2022, Minh Quang joined Vietnamese Second Division side Bình Thuận on a loan deal. He won a promotion to the V.League 2 with the team. In the 2023 season, Minh Quang scored 8 goals after 11 games, securing his team a safe position to maintain in the league, and finished himself among best goal scorers in the league.

In September 2023, Minh Quang joined SHB Đà Nẵng, signing a two-year deal.

== International career ==
Minh Quang was called up to the Vietnam U23 team for the 2023 AFF U-23 Championship. He scored a goal in the opening game against Laos and was named as the "Man of the match".

== Honours ==
SHB Đà Nẵng

- V.League 2: 2023–24

Vietnam U23

- AFF U-23 Championship: 2023
