= Nguyễn Tiến Nhật =

Vietnamese épée fencer

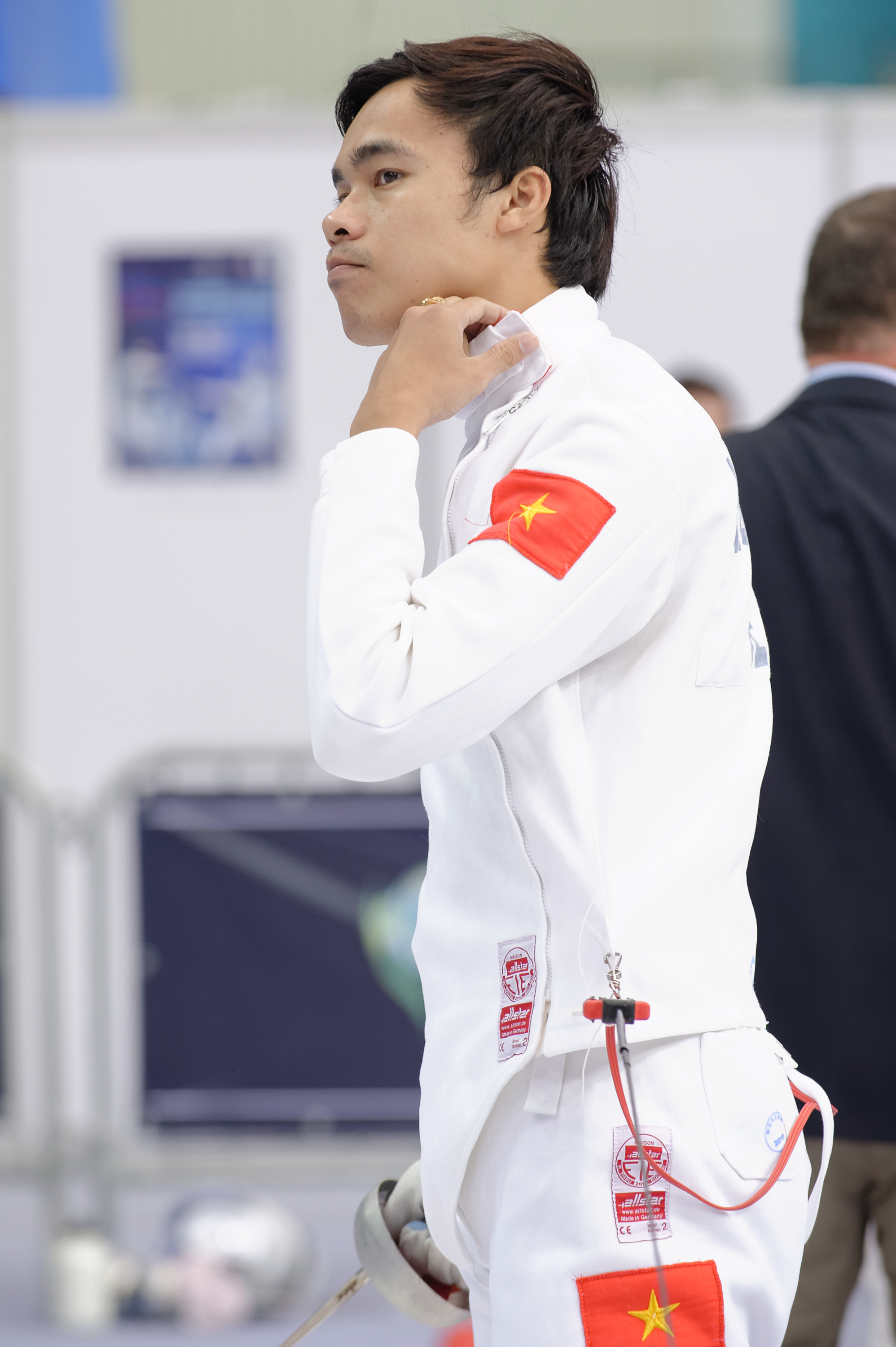

Personal information
- Nationality: Vietnam
- Born: 5 April 1990 (age 36) Ho Chi Minh City, Vietnam
- Height: 1.84 m (6 ft 0 in)
- Weight: 74 kg (163 lb)

Fencing career
- Sport: Fencing
- Weapon: épée
- Hand: right-handed
- FIE ranking: ranking
Medal record
Men's épée
Representing Vietnam
Asian Games
Bronze medal – third place	2014 Incheon	Individual Épée
Bronze medal – third place	2014 Incheon	Team Épée
Asian Championships
Bronze medal – third place	2019 Chiba	Individual épée
Southeast Asian Games
Gold medal – first place	2015 Singapore	Individual Épée
Gold medal – first place	2015 Singapore	Team Épée
Gold medal – first place	2017 Kuala Lumpur	Individual Épée
Gold medal – first place	2019 Philippines	Individual Épée
Gold medal – first place	2021 Hanoi	Individual Épée
Bronze medal – third place	2011 Palembang	Individual Épée

Nguyễn Tiến Nhật (born April 5, 1990 in Ho Chi Minh City) is a Vietnamese épée fencer.

He was flagbearer for Vietnam at the Olympics opening ceremony of the 2012 Summer Olympics on July 27, 2012.

He competed in the 2012 Summer Olympics in the Men's épée event.

Olympic Games
Preceded by Nguyễn Đình Cương	Flagbearer for Vietnam; London 2012	Succeeded by Vũ Thành An
