= Badminton at the European Games =

Badminton competition

Badminton is a core sport of the European Games. It has been a European Games sport since the inaugural edition.

== Editions ==
Games	Year	Host city	Events	Best Nation
I	2015	Baku, Azerbaijan	5	Denmark
II	2019	Minsk, Belarus	5	Great Britain
III	2023	Kraków-Małopolska, Poland	5	Denmark
IV	2027	Istanbul, Turkey	5	

- The 2023 event was held in Tarnów.

== Venues ==
Games	Venue	Other sports hosted at venue	Capacity	Ref.
2015 Baku	Baku Sports Hall	Table tennis	1,700	
2019 Minsk	Falcon Club	–	2,100	
2023 Kraków-Małopolska	Arena Jaskółka	–	4,317	
2027 Istanbul				

== Events ==
Event	15	19	23	Years
Men's singles	X	X	X	3
Women's singles	X	X	X	3
Men's doubles	X	X	X	3
Women's doubles	X	X	X	3
Mixed doubles	X	X	X	3

== Medal table ==
Rank	Nation	Gold	Silver	Bronze	Total
1	Denmark (DEN)	7	3	3	13
2	Great Britain (GBR)	2	4	3	9
3	Netherlands (NED)	2	1	1	4
4	Bulgaria (BUL)	2	0	1	3
4	Spain (ESP)	2	0	1	3
6	France (FRA)	0	4	5	9
7	Russia (RUS)	0	2	3	5
8	Belgium (BEL)	0	1	0	1
9	Germany (GER)	0	0	4	4
10	Ireland (IRL)	0	0	3	3
11	Israel (ISR)	0	0	2	2
12	Estonia (EST)	0	0	1	1
12	Lithuania (LTU)	0	0	1	1
12	Switzerland (SUI)	0	0	1	1
12	Turkey (TUR)	0	0	1	1
Totals (15 entries)		15	15	30	60

== Medalists ==
=== Men's singles ===
Games	Gold	Silver	Bronze
2015 Baku	Pablo Abián; Spain	Emil Holst; Denmark	Dieter Domke; Germany
2015 Baku	Pablo Abián; Spain	Emil Holst; Denmark	Kęstutis Navickas; Lithuania
2019 Minsk	Anders Antonsen; Denmark	Brice Leverdez; France	Raul Must; Estonia
2019 Minsk	Anders Antonsen; Denmark	Brice Leverdez; France	Misha Zilberman; Israel
2023 Kraków-Małopolska	Viktor Axelsen; Denmark	Christo Popov; France	Toma Junior Popov; France
2023 Kraków-Małopolska	Viktor Axelsen; Denmark	Christo Popov; France	Misha Zilberman; Israel

=== Men's doubles ===
Games	Gold	Silver	Bronze
2015 Baku	Denmark; Mathias Boe; Carsten Mogensen	Russia; Vladimir Ivanov; Ivan Sozonov	Germany; Raphael Beck; Andreas Heinz
2015 Baku	Denmark; Mathias Boe; Carsten Mogensen	Russia; Vladimir Ivanov; Ivan Sozonov	Ireland; Joshua Magee; Sam Magee
2019 Minsk	Great Britain; Marcus Ellis; Chris Langridge	Denmark; Kim Astrup; Anders Skaarup Rasmussen	Russia; Vladimir Ivanov; Ivan Sozonov
2019 Minsk	Great Britain; Marcus Ellis; Chris Langridge	Denmark; Kim Astrup; Anders Skaarup Rasmussen	Netherlands; Jelle Maas; Robin Tabeling
2023 Kraków-Małopolska	Denmark; Kim Astrup; Anders Skaarup Rasmussen	Great Britain; Ben Lane; Sean Vendy	Great Britain; Alexander Dunn; Adam Hall
2023 Kraków-Małopolska	Denmark; Kim Astrup; Anders Skaarup Rasmussen	Great Britain; Ben Lane; Sean Vendy	France; Christo Popov; Toma Junior Popov

=== Women's singles ===
Games	Gold	Silver	Bronze
2015 Baku	Line Kjærsfeldt; Denmark	Lianne Tan; Belgium	Petya Nedelcheva; Bulgaria
2015 Baku	Line Kjærsfeldt; Denmark	Lianne Tan; Belgium	Clara Azurmendi; Spain
2019 Minsk	Mia Blichfeldt; Denmark	Kirsty Gilmour; Great Britain	Line Kjærsfeldt; Denmark
2019 Minsk	Mia Blichfeldt; Denmark	Kirsty Gilmour; Great Britain	Evgeniya Kosetskaya; Russia
2023 Kraków-Małopolska	Carolina Marín; Spain	Mia Blichfeldt; Denmark	Kirsty Gilmour; Great Britain
2023 Kraków-Małopolska	Carolina Marín; Spain	Mia Blichfeldt; Denmark	Jenjira Stadelmann; Switzerland

=== Women's doubles ===
Games	Gold	Silver	Bronze
2015 Baku	Bulgaria; Gabriela Stoeva; Stefani Stoeva	Russia; Ekaterina Bolotova; Evgeniya Kosetskaya	Denmark; Lena Grebak; Maria Helsbøl
2015 Baku	Bulgaria; Gabriela Stoeva; Stefani Stoeva	Russia; Ekaterina Bolotova; Evgeniya Kosetskaya	Turkey; Özge Bayrak; Neslihan Yiğit
2019 Minsk	Netherlands; Selena Piek; Cheryl Seinen	Great Britain; Chloe Birch; Lauren Smith	France; Émilie Lefel; Anne Tran
2019 Minsk	Netherlands; Selena Piek; Cheryl Seinen	Great Britain; Chloe Birch; Lauren Smith	Russia; Ekaterina Bolotova; Alina Davletova
2023 Kraków-Małopolska	Bulgaria; Gabriela Stoeva; Stefani Stoeva	Netherlands; Debora Jille; Cheryl Seinen	France; Margot Lambert; Anne Tran
2023 Kraków-Małopolska	Bulgaria; Gabriela Stoeva; Stefani Stoeva	Netherlands; Debora Jille; Cheryl Seinen	Germany; Linda Efler; Isabel Lohau

=== Mixed doubles ===
Games	Gold	Silver	Bronze
2015 Baku	Denmark; Niclas Nøhr; Sara Thygesen	France; Gaetan Mittelheisser; Audrey Fontaine	Germany; Raphael Beck; Kira Kattenbeck
2015 Baku	Denmark; Niclas Nøhr; Sara Thygesen	France; Gaetan Mittelheisser; Audrey Fontaine	Ireland; Sam Magee; Chloe Magee
2019 Minsk	Great Britain; Marcus Ellis; Lauren Smith	Great Britain; Chris Adcock; Gabby Adcock	Ireland; Sam Magee; Chloe Magee
2019 Minsk	Great Britain; Marcus Ellis; Lauren Smith	Great Britain; Chris Adcock; Gabby Adcock	France; Thom Gicquel; Delphine Delrue
2023 Kraków-Małopolska	Netherlands; Robin Tabeling; Selena Piek	France; Thom Gicquel; Delphine Delrue	Great Britain; Marcus Ellis; Lauren Smith
2023 Kraków-Małopolska	Netherlands; Robin Tabeling; Selena Piek	France; Thom Gicquel; Delphine Delrue	Denmark; Mathias Christiansen; Alexandra Bøje

== Statistics ==
=== Medal leaders ===
Medalist	Nation	Games	Gold	Silver	Bronze	Total
Marcus Ellis	Great Britain	2019–2023	2	0	1	3
Gabriela Stoeva	Bulgaria	2015, 2023	2	0	0	2
Stefani Stoeva	Bulgaria	2015, 2023	2	0	0	2
Selena Piek	Netherlands	2019–2023	2	0	0	2
Lauren Smith	Great Britain	2019–2023	1	1	1	3
Kim Astrup	Denmark	2019–2023	1	1	0	2
Anders Skaarup Rasmussen	Denmark	2019–2023	1	1	0	2
Mia Blichfeldt	Denmark	2019–2023	1	1	0	2
Cheryl Seinen	Netherlands	2019–2023	1	1	0	2
Line Kjærsfeldt	Denmark	2015–2023	1	0	1	2
Robin Tabeling	Netherlands	2019–2023	1	0	1	2
Mathias Boe	Denmark	2015	1	0	0	1
Carsten Mogensen	Denmark	2015	1	0	0	1
Niclas Nøhr	Denmark	2015–2019	1	0	0	1
Sara Thygesen	Denmark	2015–2019	1	0	0	1
Anders Antonsen	Denmark	2019–2023	1	0	0	1
Viktor Axelsen	Denmark	2023	1	0	0	1
Chris Langridge	Great Britain	2019	1	0	0	1
Pablo Abián	Spain	2015–2019	1	0	0	1
Carolina Marín	Spain	2023	1	0	0	1
Thom Gicquel	France	2019–2023	0	1	1	2
Delphine Delrue	France	2019–2023	0	1	1	2
Christo Popov	France	2023	0	1	1	2
Kirsty Gilmour	Great Britain	2019–2023	0	1	1	2
Vladimir Ivanov	Russia	2015–2019	0	1	1	2
Ivan Sozonov	Russia	2015–2019	0	1	1	2
Ekaterina Bolotova	Russia	2015–2019	0	1	1	2
Evgeniya Kosetskaya	Russia	2015–2019	0	1	1	2
Lianne Tan	Belgium	2015–2023	0	1	0	1
Emil Holst	Denmark	2015	0	1	0	1
Gaetan Mittelheisser	France	2015	0	1	0	1
Audrey Fontaine	France	2015	0	1	0	1
Brice Leverdez	France	2019	0	1	0	1
Chloe Birch	Great Britain	2019	0	1	0	1
Chris Adcock	Great Britain	2019	0	1	0	1
Gabby Adcock	Great Britain	2019	0	1	0	1
Ben Lane	Great Britain	2023	0	1	0	1
Sean Vendy	Great Britain	2023	0	1	0	1
Debora Jille	Netherlands	2023	0	1	0	1
Sam Magee	Ireland	2015–2019	0	0	3	3
Toma Junior Popov	France	2023	0	0	2	2
Anne Tran	France	2019–2023	0	0	2	2
Raphael Beck	Germany	2015	0	0	2	2
Chloe Magee	Ireland	2015–2019	0	0	2	2
Misha Zilberman	Israel	2015–2023	0	0	2	2
Petya Nedelcheva	Bulgaria	2015	0	0	1	1
Lena Grebak	Denmark	2015	0	0	1	1
Maria Helsbøl	Denmark	2015	0	0	1	1
Mathias Christiansen	Denmark	2023	0	0	1	1
Alexandra Bøje	Denmark	2023	0	0	1	1
Raul Must	Estonia	2015–2019	0	0	1	1
Émilie Lefel	France	2019	0	0	1	1
Margot Lambert	France	2023	0	0	1	1
Dieter Domke	Germany	2015	0	0	1	1
Andreas Heinz	Germany	2015	0	0	1	1
Kira Kattenbeck	Germany	2015	0	0	1	1
Linda Efler	Germany	2023	0	0	1	1
Isabel Lohau	Germany	2023	0	0	1	1
Alexander Dunn	Great Britain	2023	0	0	1	1
Adam Hall	Great Britain	2023	0	0	1	1
Joshua Magee	Ireland	2015–2023	0	0	1	1
Kęstutis Navickas	Lithuania	2015	0	0	1	1
Jelle Maas	Netherlands	2019	0	0	1	1
Alina Davletova	Russia	2019	0	0	1	1
Clara Azurmendi	Spain	2015	0	0	1	1
Jenjira Stadelmann	Switzerland	2023	0	0	1	1
Özge Bayrak	Turkey	2015	0	0	1	1
Neslihan Yiğit	Turkey	2015–2023	0	0	1	1

== Participating nations ==
Nation	15	19	23	Years
Armenia (ARM)		1		1
Austria (AUT)	4	3	6	3
Azerbaijan (AZE)	2	1	6	3
Belarus (BLR)	1	4		2
Belgium (BEL)	8	4	2	3
Bulgaria (BUL)	4	5	8	3
Croatia (CRO)	4	2	1	3
Cyprus (CYP)		1	1	2
Czech Republic (CZE)	8	7	4	3
Denmark (DEN)	14	8	10	3
Estonia (EST)	4	6	4	3
Finland (FIN)	6	4	2	3
France (FRA)	8	7	9	3
Germany (GER)	8	7	8	3
Great Britain (GBR)	8	8	10	3
Greece (GRE)	1		1	2
Hungary (HUN)	2	4	2	3
Iceland (ISL)	1	1	2	3
Ireland (IRL)	8	6	8	3
Israel (ISR)	1	3	4	3
Italy (ITA)	4	5	8	3
Latvia (LAT)	1	1	1	3
Lithuania (LTU)	2	2	1	3
Luxembourg (LUX)		1	2	2
Malta (MLT)			1	1
Moldova (MDA)		2	1	2
Netherlands (NED)	8	6	8	3
Norway (NOR)	1	3	7	3
Poland (POL)	8	5	8	3
Portugal (POR)	2	2	1	3
Romania (ROM)		1	1	2
Russia (RUS)	8	8		2
Serbia (SRB)	2	1	3	3
Slovakia (SVK)	2	1	2	3
Slovenia (SLO)	1	2	4	3
Spain (ESP)	5	4	6	3
Sweden (SWE)	4	3	6	3
Switzerland (SUI)	4	4	4	3
Turkey (TUR)	8	4	2	3
Ukraine (UKR)	8	7	6	3
Total	160	144	160	
Year	15	19	23	
