= Table tennis at the European Games =

Table tennis competition

Table tennis has been a European Games sport since the inaugural edition.

== Editions ==
Games	Year	Events	Best Nation
I	2015	4	Germany
II	2019	5	Germany
III	2023	5	Germany

== Events ==
Event	15	19	23	Years
Men's singles	X	X	X	3
Men's team	X	X	X	3
Women's singles	X	X	X	3
Women's team	X	X	X	3
Mixed doubles		X	X	2

== Medal table ==
Rank	Nation	Gold	Silver	Bronze	Total
1	Germany (GER)	8	2	0	10
2	Romania (ROU)	2	2	2	6
3	Portugal (POR)	2	1	2	5
4	Netherlands (NED)	1	2	0	3
5	France (FRA)	1	1	3	5
6	Sweden (SWE)	0	2	0	2
7	Belarus (BLR)	0	1	0	1
7	Denmark (DEN)	0	1	0	1
7	Hungary (HUN)	0	1	0	1
7	Monaco (MON)	0	1	0	1
11	Austria (AUT)	0	0	1	1
11	Croatia (CRO)	0	0	1	1
11	Czech Republic (CZE)	0	0	1	1
11	Luxembourg (LUX)	0	0	1	1
11	Poland (POL)	0	0	1	1
11	Turkey (TUR)	0	0	1	1
11	Ukraine (UKR)	0	0	1	1
Totals (17 entries)		14	14	14	42

== Medallists ==
=== Men's singles ===
Games	Gold	Silver	Bronze
2015 Baku	Dimitrij Ovtcharov; Germany	Vladimir Samsonov; Belarus	Kou Lei; Ukraine
2019 Minsk	Timo Boll; Germany	Jonathan Groth; Denmark	Tomislav Pucar; Croatia
2023 Kraków-Małopolska	Félix Lebrun; France	Marcos Freitas; Portugal	Alexis Lebrun; France

=== Men's team ===
Games	Gold	Silver	Bronze
2015 Baku	Portugal; Marcos Freitas; Tiago Apolónia; João Geraldo	France; Simon Gauzy; Adrien Mattenet; Emmanuel Lebesson	Austria; Robert Gardos; Stefan Fegerl; Daniel Habesohn
2019 Minsk	Germany; Dimitrij Ovtcharov; Patrick Franziska; Timo Boll	Sweden; Jon Persson; Kristian Karlsson; Mattias Falck	Portugal; João Monteiro; Marcos Freitas; Tiago Apolónia
2023 Kraków-Małopolska	Germany; Timo Boll; Patrick Franziska; Dimitrij Ovtcharov; Dang Qiu	Sweden; Simon Berglund; Anton Källberg; Kristian Karlsson; Truls Möregårdh	France; Can Akkuzu; Simon Gauzy; Alexis Lebrun; Félix Lebrun

=== Women's singles ===
Games	Gold	Silver	Bronze
2015 Baku	Li Jiao; Netherlands	Li Jie; Netherlands	Melek Hu; Turkey
2019 Minsk	Fu Yu; Portugal	Han Ying; Germany	Ni Xialian; Luxembourg
2023 Kraków-Małopolska	Bernadette Szőcs; Romania	Xiaoxin Yang; Monaco	Elizabeta Samara; Romania

=== Women's team ===
Games	Gold	Silver	Bronze
2015 Baku	Germany; Shan Xiaona; Han Ying; Petrissa Solja	Netherlands; Li Jiao; Li Jie; Britt Eerland	Czech Republic; Renáta Štrbíková; Iveta Vacenovská; Hana Matelová
2019 Minsk	Germany; Han Ying; Nina Mittelham; Shan Xiaona; Petrissa Solja	Romania; Bernadette Szőcs; Daniela Dodean; Elizabeta Samara	Poland; Li Qian; Natalia Bajor; Natalia Partyka
2023 Kraków-Małopolska	Romania; Adina Diaconu; Andreea Dragoman; Elizabeta Samara; Bernadette Szőcs	Germany; Han Ying; Nina Mittelham; Shan Xiaona; Sabine Winter	Portugal; Inês Matos; Matilde Pinto; Shao Jieni; Fu Yu

=== Mixed doubles ===
Games	Gold	Silver	Bronze
2019 Minsk	Germany; Patrick Franziska; Petrissa Solja	Romania; Ovidiu Ionescu; Bernadette Szőcs	France; Tristan Flore; Laura Gasnier
2023 Kraków-Małopolska	Germany; Dang Qiu; Nina Mittelham	Hungary; Nándor Ecseki; Dóra Madarász	Romania; Ovidiu Ionescu; Bernadette Szőcs

== Participating nations ==
Andorra, Albania, Armenia, Iceland, Ireland, Israel, Liechtenstein, Malta, Montenegro, and North Macedonia have yet to qualify for the competition in table tennis.

Nation	15	19	23	Years
Austria (AUT)	6	6	6	3
Azerbaijan (AZE)	6			1
Belarus (BLR)	6	6		2
Belgium (BEL)	3	5	6	3
Bosnia and Herzegovina (BIH)	1	1		2
Bulgaria (BUL)	1	1		2
Croatia (CRO)	5	4	6	3
Cyprus (CYP)	1			1
Czech Republic (CZE)	6	4	6	3
Denmark (DEN)	1	3	4	3
Estonia (EST)			2	1
Finland (FIN)	1	2	2	3
France (FRA)	6	6	8	3
Georgia (GEO)			1	1
Germany (GER)	6	7	8	3
Great Britain (GBR)	3	5	6	3
Greece (GRE)	3	3	4	3
Hungary (HUN)	6	5	7	3
Italy (ITA)	2	4	6	3
Kosovo (KOS)		1		1
Latvia (LAT)	1			1
Lithuania (LTU)	1	1	1	3
Luxembourg (LUX)	3	4	6	3
Moldova (MDA)		1	2	2
Monaco (MON)		1	1	2
Netherlands (NED)	3	5	2	3
Norway (NOR)			2	1
Poland (POL)	6	5	8	3
Portugal (POR)	6	5	8	3
Romania (ROM)	6	6	8	3
Russia (RUS)	6	5		2
San Marino (SMR)	1		1	2
Serbia (SRB)	4	3	4	3
Slovakia (SVK)	4	4	8	3
Slovenia (SLO)	2	4	6	3
Spain (ESP)	5	5	4	3
Sweden (SWE)	6	6	8	3
Switzerland (SUI)	1	1	1	3
Turkey (TUR)	2	1	3	3
Ukraine (UKR)	6	5	7	3
Total countries	34	33	32	40
Total athletes	126	125	152	
Year	15	19	23	
