= 3x3 basketball at the European Games =

3x3 basketball competition

3x3 basketball has been a European Games sport since the inaugural edition.

== Venues ==
Games	Venue	Other sports hosted at venue	Capacity	Ref.
2015 Baku	Basketball Arena at Flag Square cluster	–	2,500	
2019 Minsk	Palova Arena	–	1,000	
2023 Kraków-Małopolska	Cracovia Arena	–	31,103	
2027 Istanbul				

== Medal table ==
Rank	Nation	Gold	Silver	Bronze	Total
1	Russia (RUS)	3	0	0	3
2	France (FRA)	1	1	0	2
2	Latvia (LAT)	1	1	0	2
4	Lithuania (LTU)	1	0	0	1
5	Spain (ESP)	0	1	2	3
6	Belgium (BEL)	0	1	0	1
6	Estonia (EST)	0	1	0	1
6	Ukraine (UKR)	0	1	0	1
9	Belarus (BLR)	0	0	2	2
10	Poland (POL)	0	0	1	1
10	Serbia (SRB)	0	0	1	1
Totals (11 entries)		6	6	6	18

== Men's tournament ==
Year	Host	Final			Third Place Game		
Year	Host	Gold medalists	Score	Silver medalists	Bronze medalists	Score	Fourth place
2015; Details	(Azerbaijan); Baku	Russia	18–14	Spain	Serbia	21–14	Slovenia
2019; Details	(Belarus); Minsk	Russia	21–14	Latvia	Belarus	21–15	Poland
2023; Details	(Poland); Kraków–Małopolska	Latvia	19–11	Belgium	Poland	21–18	Germany

=== Participating nations ===
Nation	15	19	23	Years
Andorra (AND)	12th	16th		2
Austria (AUT)			5th	1
Azerbaijan (AZE)	5th			1
Belarus (BLR)		3rd		1
Belgium (BEL)	11th		2nd	2
Czech Republic (CZE)	6th	8th	6th	3
Estonia (EST)	13th	14th	9th	3
France (FRA)		7th	12th	2
Germany (GER)			4th	1
Greece (GRE)	7th			1
Israel (ISR)	15th		8th	2
Italy (ITA)	9th	15th		2
Latvia (LAT)		2nd	1st	2
Lithuania (LTU)	8th	6th	7th	3
Netherlands (NED)		10th	16th	2
Poland (POL)		4th	3rd	2
Romania (ROU)	10th	11th	13th	3
Russia (RUS)	1st	1st		2
Serbia (SRB)	3rd	5th	15th	3
Slovenia (SLO)	4th	12th	11th	3
Spain (ESP)	2nd		10th	2
Switzerland (SUI)	16th		14th	2
Turkey (TUR)	14th	13th		2
Ukraine (UKR)		9th		1

== Women's tournament ==
Year	Host	Final			Third Place Game		
Year	Host	Gold medalists	Score	Silver medalists	Bronze medalists	Score	Fourth place
2015; Details	(Azerbaijan); Baku	Russia	22–17	Ukraine	Spain	19–9	Slovenia
2019; Details	(Belarus); Minsk	France	21–8	Estonia	Belarus	21–16	Germany
2023; Details	(Poland); Kraków–Małopolska	Lithuania	19–16	France	Spain	21–15	Romania

=== Participating nations ===
Nation	15	19	23	Years
Andorra (AND)		15th		1
Austria (AUT)			5th	1
Azerbaijan (AZE)	6th			1
Belarus (BLR)		3rd		1
Belgium (BEL)	12th			1
Czech Republic (CZE)	9th	5th	6th	3
Estonia (EST)		2nd	11th	2
France (FRA)		1st	2nd	2
Germany (GER)		4th	13th	2
Greece (GRE)	7th		15th	2
Hungary (HUN)		13th	14th	2
Ireland (IRL)	8th			1
Israel (ISR)	16th		7th	2
Italy (ITA)		14th		1
Latvia (LAT)		16th	16th	2
Lithuania (LTU)	11th		1st	2
Netherlands (NED)	13th	8th	9th	3
Poland (POL)			8th	1
Romania (ROU)	10th	12th	4th	3
Russia (RUS)	1st	6th		2
Serbia (SRB)		10th		1
Slovakia (SVK)	14th			1
Slovenia (SLO)	4th			1
Spain (ESP)	3rd	7th	3rd	3
Switzerland (SUI)	5th	11th	12th	3
Turkey (TUR)	15th			1
Ukraine (UKR)	2nd	9th	10th	3

== See also ==
- List of European Games medalists in 3x3 basketball
