= France at the European Games =

- IOC code: FRA
- NOC: French National Olympic and Sports Committee
- Website: www.franceolympique.com
- Medals: Gold 35 Silver 41 Bronze 57 Total 133

European Games appearances (overview)
- 2015; 2019; 2023; 2027

France participated at the inaugural edition of the European Games in 2015.

== Medal tables ==
=== Medals by Games ===
| Games | Athletes | Gold | Silver | Bronze | Total | Rank |
| (Azerbaijan) 2015 Baku | 250 | 12 | 13 | 18 | 43 | 5 |
| (Belarus) 2019 Minsk | 281 | 6 | 9 | 13 | 28 | 8 |
| (Poland) 2023 Kraków-Małopolska | 298 | 17 | 19 | 26 | 62 | 5 |
| (Turkey) 2027 Istanbul | Future event | | | | | |
| Total | | 35 | 41 | 57 | 133 | 6 |

=== Medals by sports ===
| Sport | Gold | Silver | Bronze | Total |
|---|---|---|---|---|
| Fencing | 5 | 3 | 3 | 11 |
| Judo | 5 | 2 | 7 | 14 |
| Sport climbing | 4 | 2 | 0 | 6 |
| Boxing | 3 | 6 | 3 | 12 |
| Shooting | 3 | 5 | 3 | 11 |
| Karate | 2 | 3 | 4 | 9 |
| Swimming | 2 | 1 | 3 | 6 |
| Canoe sprint | 2 | 0 | 2 | 4 |
| Cycling | 1 | 5 | 1 | 7 |
| Gymnastics | 1 | 2 | 1 | 4 |
| Athletics | 1 | 1 | 4 | 6 |
| Table tennis | 1 | 1 | 3 | 5 |
| Archery | 1 | 1 | 1 | 3 |
| 3x3 basketball | 1 | 1 | 0 | 2 |
| Taekwondo | 1 | 0 | 5 | 6 |
| Artistic swimming | 1 | 0 | 1 | 2 |
| Breakdancing | 1 | 0 | 0 | 1 |
| Badminton | 0 | 4 | 5 | 9 |
| Diving | 0 | 2 | 3 | 5 |
| Teqball | 0 | 1 | 1 | 2 |
| Modern pentathlon | 0 | 1 | 0 | 1 |
| Sambo | 0 | 0 | 3 | 3 |
| Muay thai | 0 | 0 | 2 | 2 |
| Wrestling | 0 | 0 | 2 | 2 |
| Totals (24 entries) | 35 | 41 | 57 | 133 |

== List of medallists ==
| Medal | Name(s) | Games | Sport | Event |
|---|---|---|---|---|
| Gold | Emily Thouy | (Azerbaijan) 2015 Baku | Karate | Women's 55 kg |
| Gold | Lucie Ignace | (Azerbaijan) 2015 Baku | Karate | Women's 61 kg |
| Gold | Gwladys Épangue | (Azerbaijan) 2015 Baku | Taekwondo | Women's + 67 kg |
| Gold | Valérian Sauveplane | (Azerbaijan) 2015 Baku | Shooting | Men's 50m Rifle 3 Positions |
| Gold | Nicolas D'Oriano | (Azerbaijan) 2015 Baku | Swimming | Men's 1500m freestyle |
| Gold | Ivan Trevejo | (Azerbaijan) 2015 Baku | Fencing | Men's Individual Epee |
| Gold | Nicolas D'Oriano | (Azerbaijan) 2015 Baku | Swimming | Men's 800m freestyle |
| Gold | Ivan Trevejo; Yannick Borel; Ronan Gustin; Daniel Jerent | (Azerbaijan) 2015 Baku | Fencing | Men's Team Epee |
| Gold | Emilie Andeol | (Azerbaijan) 2015 Baku | Judo | Women's +78 kg |
| Gold | Joris Daudet | (Azerbaijan) 2015 Baku | Cycling | Men's BMX |
| Gold | Pierre Duprat; Alexandre Iddir; Loic Korval; David Larose; Cyrille Maret; Loic Pietri; Florent Urani | (Azerbaijan) 2015 Baku | Judo | Men's Team |
| Gold | Clarisse Agbegnenou; Emilie Andeol; Laetitia Blot; Gévrise Émane; Annabelle Euranie; Marie Eve Gahie; Madeleine Malonga; Automne Pavia | (Azerbaijan) 2015 Baku | Judo | Women's Team |
| Silver | Steven Da Costa | (Azerbaijan) 2015 Baku | Karate | Men's 67 kg |
| Silver | Sandy Scordo | (Azerbaijan) 2015 Baku | Karate | Women's kata |
| Silver | Adrien Mattenet; Simon Gauzy; Emmanuel Lebesson | (Azerbaijan) 2015 Baku | Table tennis | Men's team |
| Silver | Laurence Brize | (Azerbaijan) 2015 Baku | Karate | Women's 50 metre rifle three positions |
| Silver | Marine Jurbert; Joëlle Vallez | (Azerbaijan) 2015 Baku | Gymnastics | Women's trampoline synchronized |
| Silver | Loïc Korval | (Azerbaijan) 2015 Baku | Judo | Men's 66 kg |
| Silver | Annabelle Euranie | (Azerbaijan) 2015 Baku | Judo | Women's 52 kg |
| Silver | Pauline Mahieu | (Azerbaijan) 2015 Baku | Swimming | Women's 50 m backstroke |
| Silver | Gaëlle Gebet; Julie Huin; Chloé Jubenot; Jéromine Mpah Njanga | (Azerbaijan) 2015 Baku | Fencing | Women's team foil |
| Silver | Sofiane Oumiha | (Azerbaijan) 2015 Baku | Boxing | Men's 60 kg |
| Silver | Estelle Mossely | (Azerbaijan) 2015 Baku | Boxing | Women's 60 kg |
| Silver | Audrey Fontaine; Gaetan Mittelheisser | (Azerbaijan) 2015 Baku | Badminton | Mixed doubles |
| Silver | Magalie Pottier | (Azerbaijan) 2015 Baku | Cycling | Women's BMX |
| Bronze | Alexandra Recchia | (Azerbaijan) 2015 Baku | Karate | Women's 50 kg |
| Bronze | Tarik Belmadani | (Azerbaijan) 2015 Baku | Wrestling | Men's Greco-Roman 59 kg |
| Bronze | Melonin Noumonvi | (Azerbaijan) 2015 Baku | Wrestling | Men's Greco-Roman 98 kg |
| Bronze | Cyrille Carré | (Azerbaijan) 2015 Baku | Canoe sprint | Men's K1 5000m |
| Bronze | Alexis Jandard | (Azerbaijan) 2015 Baku | Diving | Men's 10 metre platform |
| Bronze | Sarah Loko | (Azerbaijan) 2015 Baku | Sambo | Women's 64 kg |
| Bronze | Celine Conde | (Azerbaijan) 2015 Baku | Sambo | Women's -68 kg |
| Bronze | Anthony Terras; Lucie Anastassiou | (Azerbaijan) 2015 Baku | Shooting | Mixed Skeet |
| Bronze | Nolwenn Herve | (Azerbaijan) 2015 Baku | Swimming | Women's 50 m breaststroke |
| Bronze | Daniel Jerent | (Azerbaijan) 2015 Baku | Fencing | Men's épée |
| Bronze | Pauline Mahieu | (Azerbaijan) 2015 Baku | Swimming | Women's 100 m backstroke |
| Bronze | Matthias Marsau | (Azerbaijan) 2015 Baku | Swimming | Men's 200 m butterfly |
| Bronze | Jean-Paul Tony Helissey | (Azerbaijan) 2015 Baku | Fencing | Men's foil |
| Bronze | Margaux Rifkiss | (Azerbaijan) 2015 Baku | Fencing | Women's sabre |
| Bronze | Tony Yoka | (Azerbaijan) 2015 Baku | Boxing | Men's +91 kg |
| Bronze | Loïc Pietri | (Azerbaijan) 2015 Baku | Judo | Men's 81 kg |
| Bronze | Clarisse Agbegnenou | (Azerbaijan) 2015 Baku | Judo | Women's 63 kg |
| Bronze | Cyrille Maret | (Azerbaijan) 2015 Baku | Judo | Men's 100 kg |

== See also ==
- France at the Olympics
