= Denmark at the European Games =

- IOC code: DEN
- NOC: National Olympic Committee and Sports Confederation of Denmark
- Website: www.dif.dk
- Medals: Gold 14 Silver 10 Bronze 13 Total 37

European Games appearances (overview)
- 2015; 2019; 2023; 2027

Denmark participated in the inaugural edition of the European Games in 2015.

== Medal tables ==
=== Medals by Games ===
Games	Athletes	Gold	Silver	Bronze	Total	Rank
(Azerbaijan) 2015 Baku	65	4	3	5	12	16
(Belarus) 2019 Minsk	59	3	2	3	8	21
(Poland) 2023 Kraków	163	7	5	5	17	14
(Turkey) 2027 Istanbul	Future event					
Total		14	10	13	37	15

=== Medals by sports ===
Sport	Gold	Silver	Bronze	Total
Badminton	7	3	3	13
Canoe sprint	3	2	3	8
Beach handball	1	0	1	2
Taekwondo	1	0	1	2
Boxing	1	0	0	1
Cycling	1	0	0	1
Archery	0	2	1	3
Fencing	0	1	0	1
Shooting	0	1	0	1
Table tennis	0	1	0	1
Swimming	0	0	3	3
Teqball	0	0	1	1
Totals (12 entries)	14	10	13	37

== List of medallists ==
Games	Medal	Name(s)	Sport	Event
(Azerbaijan) 2015 Baku	Gold	Mathias Boe; Carsten Mogensen	Badminton	Men's doubles
(Azerbaijan) 2015 Baku	Gold	Simone Christensen	Cycling	Women's BMX
(Azerbaijan) 2015 Baku	Gold	Niclas Nøhr; Sara Thygesen	Badminton	Mixed doubles
(Azerbaijan) 2015 Baku	Gold	Line Kjærsfeldt	Badminton	Women's singles
(Azerbaijan) 2015 Baku	Silver	Maja Jager	Archery	Women's individual
(Azerbaijan) 2015 Baku	Silver	Stine Nielsen; Steffen Olsen	Shooting	Mixed 10 metre air rifle
(Azerbaijan) 2015 Baku	Silver	Emil Holst	Badminton	Men's singles
(Azerbaijan) 2015 Baku	Bronze	René Holten Poulsen	Canoe sprint	Men's K1-1000m
(Azerbaijan) 2015 Baku	Bronze	Lena Grebak; Maria Helsbøl	Badminton	Women's doubles
(Azerbaijan) 2015 Baku	Bronze	Tobias Bjerg	Swimming	Men's 50 metre breaststroke
(Azerbaijan) 2015 Baku	Bronze	Julie Kepp Jensen	Swimming	Women's 50 metre freestyle
(Azerbaijan) 2015 Baku	Bronze	Julie Kepp Jensen	Swimming	Women's 50 metre butterfly
(Belarus) 2019 Minsk	Gold	Emma Jørgensen	Canoe sprint	Women's K-1 200 m
(Belarus) 2019 Minsk	Gold	Anders Antonsen	Badminton	Men's singles
(Belarus) 2019 Minsk	Gold	Mia Blichfeldt	Badminton	Women's singles
(Belarus) 2019 Minsk	Silver	Jonathan Groth	Table tennis	Men's singles
(Belarus) 2019 Minsk	Silver	Kim Astrup; Anders Skaarup Rasmussen	Badminton	Men's doubles
(Belarus) 2019 Minsk	Bronze	Anne Laursen; Maja Jager; Randi Degn	Archery	Women's team recurve
(Belarus) 2019 Minsk	Bronze	Emma Jørgensen	Canoe sprint	Women's K-1 500 m
(Belarus) 2019 Minsk	Bronze	Line Kjærsfeldt	Badminton	Women's singles

== See also ==
- Denmark at the Olympics
