= Ukraine at the European Games =

- IOC code: UKR
- NOC: National Olympic Committee of Ukraine
- Website: www.noc-ukr.org (in Ukrainian and English)
- Medals Ranked 3rd: Gold 45 Silver 43 Bronze 51 Total 139

European Games appearances (overview)
- 2015; 2019; 2023; 2027

Ukraine has competed at the European Games since the inaugural 2015 Games.

== Medal tables ==
=== Medals by Games ===
Games	Athletes	Gold	Silver	Bronze	Total	Rank
(Azerbaijan) 2015 Baku	246	8	14	24	46	8
(Belarus) 2019 Minsk	197	16	17	19	52	3
(Poland) 2023 Krakow	266	21	12	8	41	3
(Turkey) 2027 Istanbul	Future event					
Total		45	43	51	139	3

=== Medals by sport ===
Sport	Gold	Silver	Bronze	Total
Athletics	6	2	4	12
Gymnastics	4	9	8	21
Canoe sprint	4	4	1	9
Karate	4	2	3	9
Diving	4	1	2	7
Fencing	4	0	1	5
Wrestling	3	6	7	16
Boxing	3	2	5	10
Judo	3	1	4	8
Muaythai	3	1	2	6
Shooting	2	1	2	5
Sambo	1	4	3	8
Cycling	1	3	0	4
Archery	1	1	2	4
Swimming	1	0	2	3
Canoe slalom	1	0	0	1
Artistic swimming	0	2	3	5
Kickboxing	0	1	1	2
3x3 basketball	0	1	0	1
Beach soccer	0	1	0	1
Breakdancing	0	1	0	1
Table tennis	0	0	1	1
Badminton	0	0	0	0
Taekwondo	0	0	0	0
Triathlon	0	0	0	0
Volleyball	0	0	0	0
Water polo	0	0	0	0
Totals (27 entries)	45	43	51	139

== Gold medalists ==
Medal	Name	Sport	Event
Gold	Heorhiy Ivanytskyy; Markiyan Ivashko; Viktor Ruban	Archery	Men's team
Gold	Olha Kharlan; Alina Komashchuk; Olena Kravatska; Olha Zhovnir	Fencing	Women's team sabre
Gold	Andriy Yagodka	Fencing	Men's sabre
Gold	Oleh Vernyayev	Gymnastics	Men's artistic individual all-around
Gold	Oleh Vernyayev	Gymnastics	Men's vault
Gold	Alina Stadnik	Wrestling	Women's freestyle 69 kg
Gold	Andriy Khloptsov	Swimming	Men's 50 metre butterfly
Gold	Inna Cherniak	Judo	Women's visually impaired 57 kg
Gold	Georgii Zantaraia	Judo	Men's 66 kg
Gold	Daria Bilodid	Judo	Women's 48 kg
Gold	Anastasiia Sapsai	Sambo	Women's +80 kg
Gold	Anna Ryzhykova; Stanislav Senyk; Tetyana Melnyk; Danylo Danylenko	Athletics	Mixed 4 x 400 m relay
Gold	Yevhen Hutsol; Olha Lyakhova; Oleksiy Pozdnyakov; Yana Kachur	Athletics	Mixed medley relay
Gold	Mariya Povkh; Liudmyla Kuklinovska	Canoe sprint	Women's K-2 200 m
Gold	Hanna Solovey	Cycling	Women's points race
Gold	2019 Ukraine athletics' national team: Maryna Bekh-Romanchuk; Bohdan Bondarenko; Bohdan Chornomaz; Danylo Danylenko; Hanna Hatsko-Fedusova; Yevhen Hutsol; Yana Kachur; Alina Lohvynenko; Olha Lyakhova; Tetyana Melnyk; Oleh Myronets; Hanna Plotitsyna; Oleksiy Pozdnyakov; Nataliya Pryshchepa; Andriy Protsenko; Anna Ryzhykova; Stanislav Senyk; Artem Shamatrin; Serhiy Smelyk; Hrystyna Stuy; Krystyna Hryshutyna	Athletics	Team event
Gold	Yuliya Tkach	Wrestling	Women's freestyle 62 kg
Gold	Victor Vykhryst	Boxing	Men's +91 kg
Gold	Oleksandr Khyzhniak	Boxing	Men's 75 kg
Gold	Oleg Verniaiev	Artistic gymnastics	Men's parallel bars
Gold	Anastasia Bachynska	Artistic gymnastics	Women's floor exercise
Gold	Stanislav Horuna	Karate	Men's kumite 75 kg
Gold	Anita Serogina	Karate	Women's kumite 61 kg
Gold	Zhan Beleniuk	Wrestling	Men's Greco-Roman 87 kg

== See also ==
- Ukraine at the Olympics
- Ukraine at the Youth Olympics
