= Spain at the European Games =

- IOC code: ESP
- NOC: Spanish Olympic Committee
- Website: www.coe.es
- Medals: Gold 34 Silver 30 Bronze 36 Total 100

European Games appearances (overview)
- 2015; 2019; 2023; 2027

Spain participated at the inaugural edition of the European Games in 2015.

== Medal tables ==
=== Medals by Games ===
Games	Athletes	Gold	Silver	Bronze	Total	Rank
(Azerbaijan) 2015 Baku	207	8	11	11	30	10
(Belarus) 2019 Minsk	150	5	2	6	13	12
(Poland) 2023 Krakow	306	21	17	19	57	2
(Turkey) 2027 Istanbul	Future event					
Total		34	30	36	100	7

=== Medals by sports ===
Sport	Gold	Silver	Bronze	Total
Karate	7	0	1	8
Taekwondo	4	3	6	13
Synchronised swimming	3	4	0	7
Athletics	3	0	2	5
Archery	2	4	3	9
Canoe sprint	2	3	3	8
Padel	2	2	1	5
Shooting	2	2	1	5
Badminton	2	0	1	3
Gymnastics	2	0	1	3
Boxing	1	1	2	4
Beach soccer	1	1	1	3
Beach handball	1	1	0	2
Canoe slalom	1	1	0	2
Cycling	1	0	1	2
Swimming	0	2	2	4
Water polo	0	2	0	2
Basketball	0	1	2	3
Judo	0	1	1	2
Kickboxing	0	1	1	2
Modern pentathlon	0	1	0	1
Diving	0	0	2	2
Sambo	0	0	2	2
Fencing	0	0	1	1
Rugby sevens	0	0	1	1
Wrestling	0	0	1	1
Totals (26 entries)	34	30	36	100

== List of medallists ==
Medal	Name(s)	Games	Sport	Event
Gold	Damián Quintero	(Azerbaijan) 2015 Baku	Karate	Men's Kata
Gold	Sandra Sánchez	(Azerbaijan) 2015 Baku	Karate	Women's Kata
Gold	Fátima Gálvez	(Azerbaijan) 2015 Baku	Shooting	Women's Trap
Gold	Rayderley Zapata	(Azerbaijan) 2015 Baku	Gymnastics Artistic	Men's Floor
Gold	Vicente Lli; Sara Moreno	(Azerbaijan) 2015 Baku	Gymnastics Aerobic	Mixed Pairs
Gold	Luis León Sánchez	(Azerbaijan) 2015 Baku	Cycling	Men's road race
Gold	Miguel Alvariño	(Azerbaijan) 2015 Baku	Archery	Men's Individual
Gold	Pablo Abián	(Azerbaijan) 2015 Baku	Badminton	Men's singles
Silver	Julia Echeberria; Berta Ferreras; Helena Jauma; Carmen Juárez; Emilia Luboslavova; Raquel Navarro; Itziar Sánchez; Irene Toledano	(Azerbaijan) 2015 Baku	Synchronised swimming	Team
Silver	Julia Echeberria; Berta Ferreras; Helena Jauma; Carmen Juárez; Emilia Luboslavova; Raquel Navarro; Itziar Sánchez; Sara Saldaña; Irene Toledano; Lidia Vigara	(Azerbaijan) 2015 Baku	Synchronised swimming	Free Combination
Silver	Berta Ferreras	(Azerbaijan) 2015 Baku	Synchronised swimming	Solo
Silver	Jesús Tortosa	(Azerbaijan) 2015 Baku	Taekwondo	Men's 58 kg
Silver	Sonia Franquet	(Azerbaijan) 2015 Baku	Shooting	Women's 10 m air pistol
Silver	Miguel Alvariño; Antonio Fernández; Juan Ignacio Rodríguez	(Azerbaijan) 2015 Baku	Archery	Men's Team
Silver	Women's national water polo team: Alejandra Aznar Carmen Baringo Alba Bonamusa Paula Crespí Helena Dalmases Sandra Domene Laura Gómez Blanca Goset Mireia Guiral Paula Leitón Elia Montoya Anna Roldán Paula Rutgers	(Azerbaijan) 2015 Baku	Water polo	Women's Team
Silver	Men's national water polo team: Oriol Albacete Jordi Chico Alex De la Fuente Josu Fernández Álvaro García Pablo Gómez de la Puente Álvaro Granados Guillermo Palomar Nikolas Paúl Josep Puig Oriol Rodríguez Marc Salvador Francisco Valera	(Azerbaijan) 2015 Baku	Water polo	Men's Team
Silver	Marcos Rodríguez	(Azerbaijan) 2015 Baku	Swimming	Men's 800 m freestyle
Silver	Sergio de la Fuente; Álex Llorca; Nacho Martín; Juan Vasco	(Azerbaijan) 2015 Baku	3x3 Basketball	Men's tournament
Silver	Alberto Lozano	(Azerbaijan) 2015 Baku	Swimming	Men's 100 m butterfly
Bronze	Maider Unda	(Azerbaijan) 2015 Baku	Wrestling	Women's 75 kg
Bronze	Eva Calvo	(Azerbaijan) 2015 Baku	Taekwondo	Women's 57 kg
Bronze	Joel González	(Azerbaijan) 2015 Baku	Taekwondo	Men's 68 kg
Bronze	Luis León Sánchez	(Azerbaijan) 2015 Baku	Cycling	Men's time trial
Bronze	Daniel Ros	(Azerbaijan) 2015 Baku	Taekwondo	Men's +80 kg
Bronze	Pedro Cabanas; Belen Guillemot; Vicente Lli; Aranzazu Martínez; Sara Moreno	(Azerbaijan) 2015 Baku	Gymnastics Aerobic	Mixed Groups
Bronze	Alicia Marín	(Azerbaijan) 2015 Baku	Archery	Women's Individual
Bronze	Marina Castro	(Azerbaijan) 2015 Baku	Swimming	Women's 800 m freestyle
Bronze	Marina Castro	(Azerbaijan) 2015 Baku	Swimming	Women's 1500 m freestyle
Bronze	Vega Gimeno; Arantxa Novo; Esther Montenegro; Inmaculada Zanoguera	(Azerbaijan) 2015 Baku	3x3 Basketball	Women's tournament
Bronze	Clara Azurmendi	(Azerbaijan) 2015 Baku	Badminton	Women's singles
Gold	Fátima Gálvez; Antonio Bailón	(Belarus) 2019 Minsk	Shooting	Mixed Team Trap
Gold	Gabriel Escobar	(Belarus) 2019 Minsk	Boxing	Men's fly -52kg
Gold	Sandra Sánchez	(Belarus) 2019 Minsk	Karate	Women's Kata
Gold	Damián Quintero	(Belarus) 2019 Minsk	Karate	Men's Kata
Gold	Laura Palacios	(Belarus) 2019 Minsk	Karate	Women's kumite +68 kg
Silver	Francisco Garrigos	(Belarus) 2019 Minsk	Judo	Men's 60 kg
Silver	Men's national beach soccer team: David Ardil Salvador Ardil Domingo Cabrera José Cintas Francisco Donaire Adrián Frutos Llorenç Gómez Pablo López Antonio Mayor Mario Soria Eduard Suárez Javier Torres	(Belarus) 2019 Minsk	Beach soccer	Men's tournament
Bronze	Julia Figueroa	(Belarus) 2019 Minsk	Judo	Women's 48kg
Bronze	Fátima Gálvez	(Belarus) 2019 Minsk	Shooting	Women's trap
Bronze	Irene Díaz	(Belarus) 2019 Minsk	Sambo	Women's 52 kg
Bronze	Yaiza Jímenez	(Belarus) 2019 Minsk	Sambo	Women's 60 kg
Bronze	Alfonso Benavides	(Belarus) 2019 Minsk	Canoe Sprint	Men's C-1 200 metres
Bronze	Pablo Acha	(Belarus) 2019 Minsk	Archery	Men's individual recurve

== See also ==
- Spain at the Olympics
