= Sweden at the European Games =

- IOC code: SWE
- NOC: Swedish Olympic Committee
- Website: www.sok.se
- Medals Ranked 26th: Gold 7 Silver 10 Bronze 12 Total 29

European Games appearances (overview)
- 2015; 2019; 2023; 2027

Sweden participated at the inaugural edition of the European Games in 2015.

== Medal tables ==
=== Medals by Games ===
Games	Athletes	Gold	Silver	Bronze	Total	Rank
(Azerbaijan) 2015 Baku	76	2	2	3	7	23
(Belarus) 2019 Minsk	47	3	1	4	8	23
(Poland) 2023 Kraków	129	2	7	5	14	26
(Turkey) 2027 Istanbul	Future event					
Total		7	10	12	29	26

=== Medals by sports ===
Sport	Gold	Silver	Bronze	Total
Shooting	2	1	1	4
Wrestling	2	0	1	3
Canoe sprint	1	1	0	2
Judo	1	0	1	2
Muaythai	1	0	1	2
Athletics	0	3	1	4
Diving	0	2	1	3
Table tennis	0	2	0	2
Boxing	0	1	2	3
Taekwondo	0	0	2	2
Gymnastics	0	0	1	1
Triathlon	0	0	1	1
Totals (12 entries)	7	10	12	29

== List of medallists ==
Medal	Name(s)	Games	Sport	Event
Gold	Sofia Mattsson	(Azerbaijan) 2015 Baku	Wrestling	Women's freestyle 55 kg
Gold	Petter Menning	(Azerbaijan) 2015 Baku	Canoe sprint	Men's K1-200 metres
Silver	Stefan Nilsson	(Azerbaijan) 2015 Baku	Shooting	Men's skeet
Silver	Anna Laurell Nash	(Azerbaijan) 2015 Baku	Boxing	Women's 75 kg
Bronze	Lisa Nordén	(Azerbaijan) 2015 Baku	Triathlon	Women's individual
Bronze	Nikita Glasnović	(Azerbaijan) 2015 Baku	Taekwondo	Women's 57 kg
Bronze	Elin Johansson	(Azerbaijan) 2015 Baku	Taekwondo	Women's 67 kg
Gold	Tommy Macias	(Belarus) 2019 Minsk	Judo	Men's 73 kg
Gold	Stefan Nilsson	(Belarus) 2019 Minsk	Shooting	Men's skeet
Gold	Sofia Mattsson	(Belarus) 2019 Minsk	Wrestling	Women's freestyle 53 kg
Silver	Mattias Falck, Kristian Karlsson, Jon Persson	(Belarus) 2019 Minsk	Table tennis	Men's team
Bronze	Anna Bernholm	(Belarus) 2019 Minsk	Judo	Women's 70 kg
Bronze	Agnes Alexiusson	(Belarus) 2019 Minsk	Boxing	Women's 60 kg
Bronze	Alex Bjurberg Kessidis	(Belarus) 2019 Minsk	Wrestling	Men's Greco-Roman 77 kg
Bronze	Jessica Castles	(Belarus) 2019 Minsk	Gymnastics	Women's floor exercise

== Competitors ==
Sport	2015	2019	2023	Total
Archery	1	3	3	7
Athletics	0	0	39	39
Badminton	0	3	6	9
Boxing	6	4	4	14
Canoe slalom	—N/a	—N/a	3	3
Canoe sprint	7	8	8	23
Cycling – mountain biking	3	—N/a	0	3
Diving	2	—N/a	5	7
Fencing	1	—N/a	12	13
Gymnastics – artistic	0	1	—N/a	1
Gymnastics – trampoline	2	3	—N/a	5
Judo	7	5	0	12
Karate	1	1	1	3
Modern pentathlon	—N/a	—N/a	2	2
Muaythai	—N/a	—N/a	3	3
Padel	—N/a	—N/a	8	8
Rugby sevens	—N/a	—N/a	13	13
Shooting	5	7	9	21
Swimming	13	—N/a	—N/a	13
Table tennis	6	6	8	20
Taekwondo	3	—N/a	5	8
Triathlon	1	—N/a	0	1
Wrestling	12	6	—N/a	18
Total	70	47	129	

== See also ==
- Sweden at the Olympics
- Sweden at the Youth Olympics
- Sweden at the Paralympics
