= Canoe sprint at the European Games =

Canoe sprint competition

Canoe sprint has been a European Games sport since the inaugural edition.

== Editions ==
Games	Year	Events	Best nation
I	2015	15	Hungary
II	2019	16	Belarus
III	2023	16	Ukraine

== Venues ==
Games	Venue	Other sports hosted at the venue	Capacity	Ref.
2015 Baku	Kur Sport and Rowing Centre, Mingachevir	—	1,300	
2019 Minsk	Zaslawye Regatta Course, Zaslawye	—	1,500	
2023 Kraków-Małopolska	Kryspinów Waterway, Cholerzyn	—	1,400	
2027 Istanbul				

== Events ==
Event	15	19	23	Years
Men's C-1 200 m	X	X	X	3
Men's C-1 500 m			X	1
Men's C-1 1000 m	X	X		2
Men's C-2 500 m			X	1
Men's C-2 1000 m	X	X		2
Men's K-1 200 m	X	X	X	3
Men's K-1 500 m			X	1
Men's K-1 1000 m	X	X		2
Men's K-1 5000 m	X	X		2
Men's K-2 200 m	X			1
Men's K-2 500 m			X	1
Men's K-2 1000 m	X	X		2
Men's K-4 500 m		X	X	2
Men's K-4 1000 m	X			1
Women's C-1 200 m		X	X	2
Women's C-1 500 m			X	1
Women's C-2 500 m			X	1
Women's K-1 200 m	X	X	X	3
Women's K-1 500 m	X	X	X	3
Women's K-1 5000 m	X	X		2
Women's K-2 200 m	X	X		2
Women's K-2 500 m	X	X	X	3
Women's K-4 500 m	X	X	X	3
Mixed C-2 200 m			X	1
Mixed K-2 200 m			X	1
Total	15	16	16	

== Medal table ==
Rank	Nation	Gold	Silver	Bronze	Total
1	Hungary (HUN)	9	6	8	23
2	Belarus (BLR)	8	2	5	15
3	Poland (POL)	5	1	6	12
4	Germany (GER)	4	8	5	17
5	Ukraine (UKR)	4	4	1	9
6	Denmark (DEN)	3	2	3	8
7	Portugal (POR)	2	5	1	8
8	Spain (ESP)	2	3	3	8
9	Serbia (SRB)	2	2	5	9
10	Lithuania (LTU)	2	0	0	2
11	Russia (RUS)	1	4	4	9
12	Romania (ROU)	1	2	0	3
13	Czech Republic (CZE)	1	1	1	3
14	Italy (ITA)	1	1	0	2
14	Sweden (SWE)	1	1	0	2
16	France (FRA)	1	0	1	2
17	Great Britain (GBR)	0	2	0	2
18	Austria (AUT)	0	1	0	1
18	Azerbaijan (AZE)	0	1	0	1
18	Georgia (GEO)	0	1	0	1
21	Latvia (LAT)	0	0	2	2
21	Slovakia (SVK)	0	0	2	2
23	Moldova (MDA)	0	0	1	1
Totals (23 entries)		47	47	48	142
