= Lithuania at the European Games =

- IOC code: LTU
- NOC: Lithuanian National Olympic Committee
- Website: www.ltok.lt
- Medals Ranked 31st: Gold 6 Silver 4 Bronze 8 Total 18

European Games appearances (overview)
- 2015; 2019; 2023; 2027

Lithuania participated at the inaugural edition of the European Games in 2015.

== Medal tables ==
=== Medals by Games ===
Games	Athletes	Gold	Silver	Bronze	Total	Rank
(Azerbaijan) 2015 Baku	70	2	1	4	7	23
(Belarus) 2019 Minsk	73	2	1	0	3	29
(Poland) 2023 Kraków	131	2	2	4	8	29
(Turkey) 2027 Istanbul	Future event					
Total		6	4	8	18	32

=== Medals by sports ===
Sport	Gold	Silver	Bronze	Total
Canoeing	2	0	0	2
Cycling	1	1	0	2
Swimming	1	1	0	2
Basketball	1	0	0	1
Gymnastics	1	0	0	1
Athletics	0	1	3	4
Modern pentathlon	0	1	0	1
Sambo	0	0	2	2
Badminton	0	0	1	1
Breaking	0	0	1	1
Volleyball	0	0	1	1
Totals (11 entries)	6	4	8	18

== List of medallists ==
Medal	Name(s)	Games	Sport	Event
Gold	Henrikas Žustautas	(Azerbaijan) 2015 Baku	Canoe sprint	Men's C1-200m
Gold	Andrius Šidlauskas	(Azerbaijan) 2015 Baku	Swimming	Men's 50 metre breaststroke
Gold	Robert Tvorogal	(Belarus) 2019 Misnk	Gymnastics	Artistic Gymnastics, Horizontal Bar
Gold	Simona Krupeckaitė	(Belarus) 2019 Misnk	Cycling	Track Cycling, Keirin
Gold	Henrikas Žustautas	(Poland) 2023 Kraków	Canoe sprint	Men's C1-200m
Gold	Giedrė Labuckienė; Martyna Petrėnaitė; Kamilė Nacickaitė; Gabrielė Šulskė	(Poland) 2023 Kraków	Basketball	Women's 3x3
Silver	Andrius Šidlauskas	(Azerbaijan) 2015 Baku	Swimming	Men's 100 metre breaststroke
Silver	Simona Krupeckaitė; Miglė Marozaitė	(Belarus) 2019 Misnk	Cycling	Track Cycling, Team Sprint
Silver	Edis Matusevičius	(Poland) 2023 Kraków	Athletics	Men's Javelin Throw
Silver	Laura Asadauskaitė; Gintarė Venčkauskaitė; Ieva Serapinaitė	(Poland) 2023 Kraków	Modern pentathlon	Women's Team
Bronze	Ieva Dumbauskaitė; Monika Povilaitytė	(Azerbaijan) 2015 Baku	Volleyball	Women's Beach volleyball
Bronze	Rūta Aksionova	(Azerbaijan) 2015 Baku	Sambo	Women's 52 kg
Bronze	Radvilas Matukas	(Azerbaijan) 2015 Baku	Sambo	Men's 90 kg
Bronze	Kestutis Navickas	(Azerbaijan) 2015 Baku	Badminton	Men's singles
Bronze	Andrius Gudžius	(Poland) 2023 Kraków	Athletics	Men's Discus Throw
Bronze	Greta Karinauskaitė	(Poland) 2023 Kraków	Athletics	Women's 3000 m steeplechase
Bronze	Gabija Galvydytė	(Poland) 2023 Kraków	Athletics	Women's 1500m
Bronze	Dominika Banevič	(Poland) 2023 Kraków	Breakdancing	B-Girls

== See also ==
- Lithuania at the Olympics
