= Belarus at the European Games =

- IOC code: BLR
- NOC: Belarus Olympic Committee
- Website: www.noc.by
- Medals: Gold 33 Silver 27 Bronze 51 Total 111

European Games appearances (overview)
- 2015; 2019; 2023; 2027

Belarus participated at the inaugural edition of the European Games in 2015. The European Olympic Committees (EOC) banned Russia and Belarus from competing at the 2023 European Games after the 2022 Russian invasion of Ukraine.

== Medal tables ==
=== Medals by games ===
Games	Athletes	Gold	Silver	Bronze	Total	Rank
(Azerbaijan) 2015 Baku	151	10	11	22	43	7
(Belarus) 2019 Minsk	221	23	16	29	69	2
(Poland) 2023 Kraków-Małopolska	Did not participate					
(Turkey) 2027 Istanbul						
Total (2/3)	372	33	27	51	111	8

=== Medals by sports ===
Sport	Gold	Silver	Bronze	Total
Canoe sprint	8	2	5	15
Gymnastics	7	4	17	28
Sambo	5	6	11	22
Cycling	4	0	3	7
Wrestling	3	4	7	14
Athletics	3	4	0	7
Boxing	1	2	0	3
Shooting	1	1	3	5
Judo	1	0	0	1
Archery	0	2	1	3
Swimming	0	1	0	1
Table tennis	0	1	0	1
3x3 basketball	0	0	2	2
Karate	0	0	2	2
Totals (14 entries)	33	27	51	111

== List of medallists ==
Medal	Name(s)	Games	Sport	Event
Gold	Vasilisa Marzaliuk	(Azerbaijan) 2015 Baku	Wrestling	Women's freestyle 75 kg
Gold	Andrei Bahdanovich; Aliaksandr Bahdanovich	(Azerbaijan) 2015 Baku	Canoe sprint	Men's C2-1000m
Gold	Maryna Litvinchuk	(Azerbaijan) 2015 Baku	Canoe sprint	Women's K1-5000m
Gold	Marharyta Makhneva; Maryna Litvinchuk	(Azerbaijan) 2015 Baku	Canoe sprint	Women's K2-200m
Gold	Vitali Bubnovich	(Azerbaijan) 2015 Baku	Shooting	Men's 10 metre air rifle
Gold	Vasil Kiryienka	(Azerbaijan) 2015 Baku	Cycling	Men's individual time trial
Gold	Alena Amialiusik	(Azerbaijan) 2015 Baku	Cycling	Women's road race
Gold	Ksenya Cheldishkina; Maria Kadobina; Valeriya Pischelina; Arina Tsitsilina; Hanna Dudzenkova	(Azerbaijan) 2015 Baku	Gymnastics	Women's rhythmic group Clubs and hoops
Gold	Stsiapan Papou	(Azerbaijan) 2015 Baku	Sambo	Men's 74kg
Gold	Tatsiana Matsko	(Azerbaijan) 2015 Baku	Sambo	Women's 64kg
Silver	Soslan Daurov	(Azerbaijan) 2015 Baku	Wrestling	Men's Greco-Roman 59 kg
Silver	Aleksei Shemarov	(Azerbaijan) 2015 Baku	Wrestling	Men's freestyle 125 kg
Silver	Hanna Marusava; Ekaterina Timofeyeva; Alena Tolkach	(Azerbaijan) 2015 Baku	Archery	Women's team
Silver	Vladimir Samsonov	(Azerbaijan) 2015 Baku	Table tennis	Men's singles
Silver	Melitina Staniouta	(Azerbaijan) 2015 Baku	Gymnastics	Women's rhythmic individual hoop
Silver	Uladzislau Hancharou	(Azerbaijan) 2015 Baku	Gymnastics	Men's trampoline individual
Silver	Uladzislau Hancharou; Mikalai Kazak	(Azerbaijan) 2015 Baku	Gymnastics	Men's trampoline synchronized
Silver	Andrei Kazusionak	(Azerbaijan) 2015 Baku	Sambo	Men's 90kg
Silver	Volha Namazava	(Azerbaijan) 2015 Baku	Sambo	Women's -68kg
Silver	Mikita Tsymyh	(Azerbaijan) 2015 Baku	Swimming	Men's 200 m backstroke
Silver	Dzmitry Asanau	(Azerbaijan) 2015 Baku	Boxing	Men's 56kg
Bronze	Viktar Sasunouski	(Azerbaijan) 2015 Baku	Wrestling	Men's Greco-Roman 80 kg
Bronze	Ksenya Cheldishkina; Maria Kadobina; Aliaksandra Narkevich; Valeriya Pischelina; Arina Tsitsilina; Hanna Dudzenkova	(Azerbaijan) 2015 Baku	Gymnastics	Women's group all-around
Bronze	Katsiaryna Barysevich; Veranika Nabokina; Karina Sandovich	(Azerbaijan) 2015 Baku	Gymnastics	Women's acrobatics groups all-around
Bronze	Katsiaryna Barysevich; Veranika Nabokina; Karina Sandovich	(Azerbaijan) 2015 Baku	Gymnastics	Women's acrobatics groups balance
Bronze	Katsiaryna Barysevich; Veranika Nabokina; Karina Sandovich	(Azerbaijan) 2015 Baku	Gymnastics	Women's acrobatics groups dynamic
Bronze	Melitina Staniouta	(Azerbaijan) 2015 Baku	Gymnastics	Women's rhythmic individual all-around
Bronze	Melitina Staniouta	(Azerbaijan) 2015 Baku	Gymnastics	Women's rhythmic individual ball
Bronze	Melitina Staniouta	(Azerbaijan) 2015 Baku	Gymnastics	Women's rhythmic individual clubs
Bronze	Hanna Harchonak	(Azerbaijan) 2015 Baku	Gymnastics	Women's trampoline individual
Bronze	Yury Rybak	(Azerbaijan) 2015 Baku	Sambo	Men's +100kg
Bronze	Katsiaryna Prakapenka	(Azerbaijan) 2015 Baku	Sambo	Women's 60kg
Bronze	Vitaliy Bialko; Raman Piatrushenka	(Azerbaijan) 2015 Baku	Canoe sprint	Men's K2-1000m
Bronze	Pavel Miadzvedzeu; Vitaliy Bialko; Aleh Yurenia; Raman Piatrushenka	(Azerbaijan) 2015 Baku	Canoe sprint	Men's K4-1000m
Bronze	Sergei Martynov	(Azerbaijan) 2015 Baku	Shooting	Men's 50 metre rifle prone
Bronze	Viktoria Chaika	(Azerbaijan) 2015 Baku	Shooting	Women's 10 metre air pistol
Bronze	Vitali Bubnovich	(Azerbaijan) 2015 Baku	Shooting	Men's 50 metre rifle three positions
Bronze	Ioseb Chugoshvili	(Azerbaijan) 2015 Baku	Wrestling	Men's Greco-Roman 130 kg
Bronze	Nadzeya Shushko	(Azerbaijan) 2015 Baku	Wrestling	Women's freestyle 53 kg
Bronze	Veranika Ivanova	(Azerbaijan) 2015 Baku	Wrestling	Women's freestyle 60 kg
Bronze	Maryia Mamashuk	(Azerbaijan) 2015 Baku	Wrestling	Women's freestyle 63 kg
Bronze	Anton Prilepov	(Azerbaijan) 2015 Baku	Archery	Men's individual

== See also ==
- Belarus at the Olympics
- Belarus at the Paralympics
- Belarus at the Deaflympics
- Belarus at the Youth Olympics
- European Youth Olympic Festival
- European Para Youth Games
