= Portugal at the European Games =

- IOC code: POR
- NOC: Olympic Committee of Portugal
- Website: www.comiteolimpicoportugal.pt
- Medals: Gold 9 Silver 17 Bronze 15 Total 41

European Games appearances (overview)
- 2015; 2019; 2023; 2027

Portugal participated at the inaugural edition of the European Games in 2015.

== Medal tables ==
=== Medals by Games ===
Games	Athletes	Gold	Silver	Bronze	Total	Rank
(Azerbaijan) 2015 Baku	100	3	4	3	10	19
(Belarus) 2019 Minsk	99	3	6	6	15	17
(Poland) 2023 Kraków-Małopolska	208	3	7	6	16	21
(Turkey) 2027 Istanbul	Future event					
Total		9	17	15	41	22

=== Medals by sports ===
Sport	Gold	Silver	Bronze	Total
Canoe sprint	2	5	1	8
Athletics	2	2	1	5
Table tennis	2	1	2	5
Judo	1	1	1	3
Beach soccer	1	0	2	3
Taekwondo	1	0	1	2
Gymnastics	0	2	3	5
Muay thai	0	2	0	2
Shooting	0	1	1	2
Cycling	0	1	0	1
Fencing	0	1	0	1
Triathlon	0	1	0	1
Karate	0	0	2	2
Padel	0	0	1	1
Totals (14 entries)	9	17	15	41

== List of medallists ==
Medal	Name(s)	Games	Sport	Event
Gold	Tiago Apolónia; Marcos Freitas; João Geraldo	(Azerbaijan) 2015 Baku	Table tennis	Men's team
Gold	Rui Bragança	(Azerbaijan) 2015 Baku	Taekwondo	Men's –58 kg
Gold	Telma Monteiro	(Azerbaijan) 2015 Baku	Judo	Women's –57 kg
Silver	João Silva	(Azerbaijan) 2015 Baku	Triathlon	Men's triathlon
Silver	Fernando Pimenta	(Azerbaijan) 2015 Baku	Canoe sprint	Men's K1 1000 m
Silver	Fernando Pimenta	(Azerbaijan) 2015 Baku	Canoe sprint	Men's K1 5000 m
Silver	João Costa	(Azerbaijan) 2015 Baku	Shooting	Men's 10 m air pistol
Bronze	Júlio Ferreira	(Azerbaijan) 2015 Baku	Taekwondo	Men's –80 kg
Bronze	Ana Rente; Beatriz Martins	(Azerbaijan) 2015 Baku	Gymnastics	Women's trampoline synchronized
Bronze	Men's national beach soccer team: Alan Cavalcanti Elinton Andrade Tiago Batalha Nuno Belchior Rui Coimbra José Maria Fonseca Madjer Bruno Novo Tiago Petrony Bernardo Santos Jordan Santos Bruno Torres	(Azerbaijan) 2015 Baku	Beach soccer	Men's tournament

== See also ==
- Portugal at the Olympics
