= Ireland at the European Games =

- IOC code: IRL
- NOC: Olympic Federation of Ireland
- Website: olympics.ie
- Medals: Gold 7 Silver 7 Bronze 12 Total 26

European Games appearances (overview)
- 2015; 2019; 2023; 2027

Ireland participated at the inaugural edition of the European Games in 2015.

== Medal tables ==
=== Medals by Games ===
Games	Athletes	Gold	Silver	Bronze	Total	Rank
(Azerbaijan) 2015 Baku	62	2	1	3	6	26
(Belarus) 2019 Minsk	65	1	2	4	7	31
(Poland) 2023 Kraków-Małopolska	123	4	4	5	13	18
(Turkey) 2027 Istanbul	Future event					
Total		7	7	12	26	27

=== Medals by sports ===
Sport	Gold	Silver	Bronze	Total
Boxing	5	4	4	13
Kickboxing	1	2	2	5
Rugby_Sevens	1	0	0	1
Taekwondo	0	1	0	1
Badminton	0	0	5	5
Athletics	0	0	1	1
Totals (6 entries)	7	7	12	26

== List of medallists ==
Medal	Name(s)	Games	Sport	Event
Gold	Michael O'Reilly	(Azerbaijan) 2015 Baku	Boxing	Men's 75 kg
Gold	Katie Taylor	(Azerbaijan) 2015 Baku	Boxing	Women's 60 kg
Silver	Brendan Irvine	(Azerbaijan) 2015 Baku	Boxing	Men's 49 kg
Bronze	Seán McComb	(Azerbaijan) 2015 Baku	Boxing	Men's 60 kg
Bronze	Joshua Magee; Sam Magee	(Azerbaijan) 2015 Baku	Badminton	Men's doubles
Bronze	Chloe Magee; Sam Magee	(Azerbaijan) 2015 Baku	Badminton	Mixed doubles

== See also ==
- Ireland at the Olympics
