= Russia at the European Games =

- IOC code: RUS
- NOC: Russian Olympic Committee
- Website: www.olympic.ru
- Medals Ranked 1st: Gold 123 Silver 64 Bronze 86 Total 273

European Games appearances (overview)
- 2015; 2019; 2023; 2027

Russia has competed at the European Games since the inaugural 2015 Games. The European Olympic Committees (EOC) banned Russia and Belarus from competing at the 2023 European Games after the 2022 Russian invasion of Ukraine.

== Medal tables ==
=== Medals by Games ===
Games	Athletes	Gold	Silver	Bronze	Total	Rank
(Azerbaijan) 2015 Baku	353	79	40	45	164	1
(Belarus) 2019 Minsk	218	44	24	41	109	1
(Poland) 2023 Kraków-Małopolska	Suspended					
(Turkey) 2027 Istanbul	Future event					
Total		123	64	86	273	1

=== Medals by sport ===
Sport	Gold	Silver	Bronze	Total
Gymnastics	29	14	9	52
Swimming	23	7	12	42
Wrestling	18	4	10	32
Sambo	12	3	11	26
Shooting	8	4	6	18
Judo	6	4	8	18
Boxing	5	5	7	17
Cycling	5	1	7	13
Synchronised swimming	4	0	0	4
Diving	3	5	1	9
3x3 basketball	3	0	0	3
Fencing	1	5	3	9
Canoe sprint	1	4	4	9
Taekwondo	1	2	2	5
Athletics	1	2	0	3
Archery	1	1	0	2
Beach soccer	1	0	0	1
Water polo	1	0	0	1
Badminton	0	2	3	5
Volleyball	0	1	1	2
Karate	0	0	2	2
Totals (21 entries)	123	64	86	273

== See also ==
- Russia at the Olympics
- Russia at the Youth Olympics
