= Gymnastics at the European Games =

Gymnastics at the European Games refers to instances where events in the field of gymnastics were held as part of the European Games.

These include:

- Gymnastics at the 2015 European Games. Gymnastics competitions at the 2015 European Games were held in the National Gymnastics Arena, Baku between 15–20 June 2015. In all, five different disciplines were contested. In addition to the existing Olympic programme, additional events were held in both the rhythmic gymnastics and trampolining disciplines. In addition, events in two non-Olympic disciplines, aerobic gymnastics and acrobatic gymnastics were included.
- Gymnastics at the 2019 European Games. Gymnastics competitions at the 2019 European Games in Minsk, Belarus, were held from 22 to 30 June 2019 at the Minsk-Arena. A total of 32 gymnastics events were held in the five disciplines; artistic, rhythmic, trampolining, aerobic and acrobatic.

These events should not be confused with the European Artistic Gymnastics Championships which are held as stand-alone Championships, or form part of the European Championships multi-sport event; in both those cases the events held by the governing body of European gymnastics, and the winners are considered European champions. The events in this article are organised by the European Olympic Committees in the Olympic tradition, and the champions of these events are solely European Games champions.

== All-time medal table ==
Rank	Nation	Gold	Silver	Bronze	Total
1	Russia	29	14	9	52
2	Belarus	7	4	17	28
3	Belgium	6	4	0	10
4	Ukraine	4	9	8	21
5	Israel	2	4	2	8
6	Switzerland	2	1	1	4
7	Italy	2	1	0	3
8	Spain	2	0	1	3
9	Slovenia	2	0	0	2
10	Azerbaijan	1	5	4	10
11	Germany	1	3	1	5
12	France	1	2	1	4
13	Netherlands	1	1	4	6
14	Armenia	1	1	0	2
14	Greece	1	1	0	2
16	Hungary	1	0	2	3
17	Finland	1	0	0	1
17	Lithuania	1	0	0	1
17	Poland	1	0	0	1
20	Bulgaria	0	4	2	6
21	Great Britain	0	3	4	7
22	Romania	0	3	3	6
23	Portugal	0	2	3	5
24	Turkey	0	1	2	3
25	Georgia	0	1	1	2
26	Cyprus	0	1	0	1
26	Czech Republic	0	1	0	1
28	Sweden	0	0	1	1
Totals (28 entries)		66	66	66	198
