= Greece at the European Games =

- IOC code: GRE
- NOC: Hellenic Olympic Committee
- Website: www.hoc.gr
- Medals: Gold 6 Silver 11 Bronze 18 Total 35

European Games appearances (overview)
- 2015; 2019; 2023; 2027

Greece has participated at the first three editions of the European Games.

== Medal tables ==
=== Medals by Games ===
Games	Athletes	Gold	Silver	Bronze	Total	Rank	Reference
(Azerbaijan) 2015 Baku	132	1	4	4	9	29	
(Belarus) 2019 Minsk	65	3	2	4	9	20	
(Poland) 2023 Krakow	170	2	5	10	17	27	
(Turkey) 2027 Istanbul	Future event						
Total		6	11	18	35	28	

=== Medals by sports ===
Sport	Gold	Silver	Bronze	Total
Shooting	2	3	1	6
Cycling	2	0	0	2
Athletics	1	1	2	4
Gymnastics	1	1	0	2
Karate	0	3	3	6
Kickboxing	0	1	1	2
Swimming	0	1	1	2
Sambo	0	1	0	1
Taekwondo	0	0	3	3
Judo	0	0	2	2
Water polo	0	0	2	2
Artistic swimming	0	0	1	1
Fencing	0	0	1	1
Muaythai	0	0	1	1
Totals (14 entries)	6	11	18	35

== List of medallists ==
Medal	Name(s)	Games	Sport	Event
Gold	Eleftherios Petrounias	(Azerbaijan) 2015 Baku	Gymnastics	Men's Rings
Silver	Vlasios Maras	(Azerbaijan) 2015 Baku	Gymnastics	Men's Horizontal Bar
Silver	Michail Georgos Tzanos	(Azerbaijan) 2015 Baku	Karate	Men's Kumite -84 kg
Silver	Anna Korakaki; Konstantinos Malgarinos	(Azerbaijan) 2015 Baku	Shooting	Mixed 10m Air Pistol
Silver	Dimitrios Dimitriou	(Azerbaijan) 2015 Baku	Swimming	Men's 400m Freestyle
Bronze	Ilias Iliadis	(Azerbaijan) 2015 Baku	Judo	Men's -90kg
Bronze	Ilketra Varvara Lebl	(Azerbaijan) 2015 Baku	Swimming	Women's 100m Βutterfly
Bronze	Men's U-18 national water polo team: Foivos Kalis Kimon Alexiou Nikolaos Gardikas Dimitrios Nikolaidis Alexandros Papanastasiou Nikolaos Papasifakis Dimitrios Skoumpakis Konstantinos Chondrokoukis Grigorios Giannopoulos Polymeris Siordilis Nikolaos Delagrammatikas Nikolaos Kalargyros Adamantios Mantis	(Azerbaijan) 2015 Baku	Water polo	Men's Tournament
Bronze	Women's U-18 national water polo team: Eleni Sotireli Evangelia Loudi Maria Patra Eleni Elliniadi Elisavet Protopapas Milva Kalogerakou Silia Logotheti Vasiliki Plevritou Artemis Safeti Ioanna Stamatopoulou Adamantia Doureka Nikoleta Eleftheriadou Ifigenia Mavrota	(Azerbaijan) 2015 Baku	Water polo	Women's Tournament
Gold	Christos Volikakis	(Belarus) 2019 Minsk	Cycling	Men's Scratch Race
Gold	Christos Volikakis	(Belarus) 2019 Minsk	Cycling	Men's Points Race
Gold	Anna Korakaki	(Belarus) 2019 Minsk	Shooting	Women's 25m Pistol
Silver	Anna Korakaki	(Belarus) 2019 Minsk	Shooting	Women's 10m Air Pistol
Silver	Savvas Karakizidis	(Belarus) 2019 Minsk	Sambo	Men's −62kg
Bronze	Georgios Azoidis	(Belarus) 2019 Minsk	Judo	Men's −73kg
Bronze	Rafailía Spanoudaki-Hatziriga	(Belarus) 2019 Minsk	Athletics	Women's 100m
Bronze	Konstantinos Douvalidis	(Belarus) 2019 Minsk	Athletics	Men's 110m Hurdles
Bronze	Eleni Chatziliadou	(Belarus) 2019 Minsk	Karate	Women's Kumite +68kg
Gold	Miltiadis Tentoglou	(Poland) 2023 Krakow	Athletics	Men's Long Jump
Gold	Anna Korakaki	(Poland) 2023 Krakow	Shooting	25m Pistol Women
Silver	Emmanouil Karalis	(Poland) 2023 Krakow	Athletics	Men's Pole Vault
Silver	Georgios Tsampodimos Leovaris	(Poland) 2023 Krakow	Kickboxing	Men's Point Fighting -63 kg
Silver	Christos-Stefanos Xenos	(Poland) 2023 Krakow	Karate	Men's Kumite -60kg
Silver	Dionysios Xenos	(Poland) 2023 Krakow	Karate	Men's Kumite -67kg
Silver	Emmanouela Katzouraki	(Poland) 2023 Krakow	Shooting	Skeet Women
Bronze	Theodora Gkountoura	(Poland) 2023 Krakow	Fencing	Women's Sabre Individual
Bronze	Paraskevi Semeli Zarmakoupi	(Poland) 2023 Krakow	Kickboxing	Women's Light Contact -50 kg
Bronze	Georgia Archontia Xenou	(Poland) 2023 Krakow	Karate	Women's Kata
Bronze	Kyriaki Kydonaki	(Poland) 2023 Krakow	Karate	Women's Kumite +68kg
Bronze	Kyriakos Bakirtzis	(Poland) 2023 Krakow	Muaythai	Men's Combat -91kg
Bronze	Greece men's national skeet team: Charalampos Chalkiadakis Nikolaos Mavrommatis Efthimios Mitas	(Poland) 2023 Krakow	Shooting	Skeet Men's Team
Bronze	Sofia Malkogeorgou, Evangelia Platanioti	(Poland) 2023 Krakow	Artistic swimming	Duet Technical
Bronze	Konstantinos Dimitropoulos	(Poland) 2023 Krakow	Taekwondo	Men -54kg
Bronze	Konstantinos Chamalidis	(Poland) 2023 Krakow	Taekwondo	Men -68kg
Bronze	Apostolos Telikostoglou	(Poland) 2023 Krakow	Taekwondo	Men -80kg

== See also ==
- Greece at the Olympics
