= Hungary at the European Games =

- IOC code: HUN
- NOC: Hungarian Olympic Committee
- Website: www.olimpia.hu
- Medals: Gold 21 Silver 20 Bronze 35 Total 76

European Games appearances (overview)
- 2015; 2019; 2023; 2027

Hungary participated at the inaugural edition of the European Games in 2015.

== Medal tables ==
=== Medals by Games ===
Games	Athletes	Gold	Silver	Bronze	Total	Rank
(Azerbaijan) 2015 Baku	200	7	4	8	19	12
(Belarus) 2019 Minsk	125	4	6	9	19	13
(Poland) 2023 Kraków	219	10	10	18	38	8
(Turkey) 2027 Istanbul	Future event					
Total		21	20	35	76	11

=== Medals by sports ===
Sport	Gold	Silver	Bronze	Total
Canoe sprint	9	6	8	23
Shooting	4	1	1	6
Teqball	3	0	0	3
Wrestling	2	2	2	6
Kickboxing	1	2	5	8
Fencing	1	2	3	6
Gymnastics	1	0	2	3
Judo	0	1	2	3
Modern pentathlon	0	1	2	3
Taekwondo	0	1	2	3
Athletics	0	1	1	2
Swimming	0	1	1	2
Beach handball	0	1	0	1
Table tennis	0	1	0	1
Boxing	0	0	3	3
Karate	0	0	2	2
Triathlon	0	0	1	1
Totals (17 entries)	21	20	35	76

== List of medallists ==
Medal	Name(s)	Games	Sport	Event
Gold	Marianna Sastin	(Azerbaijan) 2015 Baku	Wrestling	Women's freestyle 60 kg
Gold	Zoltán Kammerer; Tamás Szalai	(Azerbaijan) 2015 Baku	Canoe sprint	Men's K2-1000m
Gold	Anna Kárász; Danuta Kozák; Gabriella Szabó; Ninetta Vad	(Azerbaijan) 2015 Baku	Canoe sprint	Women's K4-500m
Gold	Emese Barka	(Azerbaijan) 2015 Baku	Wrestling	Women's freestyle 58 kg
Gold	Zoltán Kammerer; Tamás Kulifai; Dávid Tóth; Dániel Pauman	(Azerbaijan) 2015 Baku	Canoe sprint	Men's K4-1000m
Gold	Danuta Kozák	(Azerbaijan) 2015 Baku	Canoe sprint	Women's K1-500m
Gold	Panna Szollosi; Dora Lendvay; Dora Hegyi; Balázs Farkas; Daniel Bali	(Azerbaijan) 2015 Baku	Gymnastics	Aerobic Mixed groups
Silver	Bálint Korpási	(Azerbaijan) 2015 Baku	Wrestling	Men's Greco-Roman 71 kg
Silver	Richárd Bognár	(Azerbaijan) 2015 Baku	Shooting	Men's double trapg
Silver	Janka Juhász	(Azerbaijan) 2015 Baku	Swimming	Women's 1500 metre freestyle
Silver	Hedvig Karakas	(Azerbaijan) 2015 Baku	Judo	Women's 57 kg
Bronze	Attila Vajda	(Azerbaijan) 2015 Baku	Canoe sprint	Men's C1-1000m
Bronze	Sándor Tótka; Peter Molnar	(Azerbaijan) 2015 Baku	Canoe sprint	Men's K2-200m
Bronze	Danuta Kozák	(Azerbaijan) 2015 Baku	Canoe sprint	Women's K1-200m
Bronze	Renáta Csay	(Azerbaijan) 2015 Baku	Canoe sprint	Women's K1-5000m
Bronze	Anna Kárász; Ninetta Vad	(Azerbaijan) 2015 Baku	Canoe sprint	Women's K2-500m
Bronze	Boglarka Bonecz	(Azerbaijan) 2015 Baku	Swimming	Women's 200 metre butterfly
Bronze	Éva Csernoviczki	(Azerbaijan) 2015 Baku	Judo	Women's 48 kg
Bronze	Zoltán Harcsa	(Azerbaijan) 2015 Baku	Boxing	Men's 75 kg
Gold	Bálint Kopasz	(Belarus) 2019 Minsk	Canoe sprint	Men's K-1 1000m
Gold	Virág Balla; Kincső Takács	(Belarus) 2019 Minsk	Canoe sprint	Women's C-2 500m
Gold	Anna Kárász; Danuta Kozák; Tamara Csipes; Erika Medveczky	(Belarus) 2019 Minsk	Canoe sprint	Women's K-4 500m
Gold	Bálint Kopasz	(Belarus) 2019 Minsk	Canoe sprint	Men's K-1 5000m
Silver	Anna Kárász; Danuta Kozák	(Belarus) 2019 Minsk	Canoe sprint	Women's K-2 500m
Silver	Danuta Kozák	(Belarus) 2019 Minsk	Canoe sprint	Women's K-1 500m
Silver	Danuta Kozák	(Belarus) 2019 Minsk	Canoe sprint	Women's K-1 200m
Silver	Balázs Birkás	(Belarus) 2019 Minsk	Canoe sprint	Men's K-1 200m
Silver	Dóra Bodonyi	(Belarus) 2019 Minsk	Canoe sprint	Women's K-1 5000m
Silver	Erik Torba	(Belarus) 2019 Minsk	Wrestling	Men's Greco-Roman 60 kg
Bronze	Attila Ungvári	(Belarus) 2019 Minsk	Judo	Men's 81 kg
Bronze	Gréta Kerekes	(Belarus) 2019 Minsk	Athletics	Women's 100m hurdles
Bronze	István Péni	(Belarus) 2019 Minsk	Shooting	Men's 50 metre rifle three positions
Bronze	Tamás Lőrincz	(Belarus) 2019 Minsk	Wrestling	Men's Greco-Roman 77 kg
Bronze	Sára Péter	(Belarus) 2019 Minsk	Gymnastics	Women's vault
Bronze	Viktor Lőrincz	(Belarus) 2019 Minsk	Wrestling	Men's Greco-Roman 87 kg
Bronze	Dávid Vecsernyés	(Belarus) 2019 Minsk	Gymnastics	Men's horizontal bar
Bronze	Yves Martial Tadissi	(Belarus) 2019 Minsk	Karate	Men's kumite 67 kg
Bronze	Gábor Hárspataki	(Belarus) 2019 Minsk	Karate	Men's kumite 75 kg
Gold	Eszter Mészáros; Zalán Pekler	(Poland) 2023 Kraków	Shooting	Mixed team 10 metre air rifle
Gold	Ádám Varga	(Poland) 2023 Kraków	Canoe sprint	Men's K-1 500m
Gold	István Péni; Zalán Pekler; Soma Hammerl	(Poland) 2023 Kraków	Shooting	Men's team 10 metre air rifle
Gold	Zalán Pekler	(Poland) 2023 Kraków	Shooting	50 metre rifle 3 positions
Silver	Ádám Balog; Balázs Csuka; Norbert Gyene; Péter Hajdú; András John; László Kovácsovics; Attila Kun; László Nahaj; Csanád Neukum; Bence Rozmán; Patrik Vizes; Bence Zakics	(Poland) 2023 Kraków	Beach Handball	Men's tournament
Silver	Alida Dóra Gazsó	(Poland) 2023 Kraków	Canoe sprint	Women's K-1 500m
Silver	Bianka Kéri	(Poland) 2023 Kraków	Athletics	Women's 800 metres
Silver	Luana Márton	(Poland) 2023 Kraków	Taekwondo	Women's featherweight
Silver	Flóra Pásztor	(Poland) 2023 Kraków	Fencing	Women's individual foil
Silver	Nándor Ecseki; Dóra Madarász	(Poland) 2023 Kraków	Table tennis	Mixed doubles
Bronze	Giada Bragato; Bianka Nagy	(Poland) 2023 Kraków	Canoe sprint	Women's C-2 500m
Bronze	Alida Dóra Gazsó; Tamara Csipes	(Poland) 2023 Kraków	Canoe sprint	Women's K-2 500m
Bronze	Ágnes Kiss	(Poland) 2023 Kraków	Canoe sprint	Women's C-1 500m
Bronze	Luca Patakfalvy	(Poland) 2023 Kraków	Taekwondo	Women's bantamweight
Bronze	Áron Szilágyi	(Poland) 2023 Kraków	Fencing	Men's individual sabre
Bronze	Anna Kun	(Poland) 2023 Kraków	Fencing	Women's individual épée
Bronze	Kelen Bailey	(Poland) 2023 Kraków	Taekwondo	Men's middleweight

== See also ==
- Hungary at the Olympics
- Hungary at the Paralympics
