= Serbia at the European Games =

- IOC code: SRB
- NOC: Olympic Committee of Serbia
- Website: www.oks.org.rs (in Serbian)
- Medals: Gold 12 Silver 12 Bronze 14 Total 38

European Games appearances (overview)
- 2015; 2019; 2023; 2027

Serbia participated in the inaugural edition of the European Games in 2015.

== Medal tables ==
=== Medals by Games ===
Games	Athletes	Gold	Silver	Bronze	Total	Rank
(Azerbaijan) 2015 Baku	132	8	4	4	16	11
(Belarus) 2019 Minsk	66	1	2	3	6	33
(Poland) 2023 Kraków	121	3	6	7	16	22
(Turkey) 2027 Istanbul	Future event					
Total		12	12	14	38	17

=== Medals by sports ===
Sport	Gold	Silver	Bronze	Total
Shooting	5	1	1	7
Canoe sprint	2	2	5	9
Taekwondo	1	3	1	5
Sambo	1	0	2	3
Kickboxing	1	0	1	2
Athletics	1	0	0	1
Water polo	1	0	0	1
Wrestling	0	2	1	3
Boxing	0	2	0	2
Teqball	0	2	0	2
3x3 basketball	0	0	1	1
Swimming	0	0	1	1
Volleyball	0	0	1	1
Totals (13 entries)	12	12	14	38

== List of medallists ==
Medal	Name(s)	Games	Sport	Event
Gold	Dalma Ružičić-Benedek; Milica Novaković	(Azerbaijan) 2015 Baku	Canoe sprint	Women's K-2 500m
Gold	Marko Novaković; Nebojša Grujić	(Azerbaijan) 2015 Baku	Canoe sprint	Men's K-2 200m
Gold	Andrea Arsović	(Azerbaijan) 2015 Baku	Shooting	Women's 10 metre air rifle
Gold	Zorana Arunović	(Azerbaijan) 2015 Baku	Shooting	Women's 10 m air pistol
Gold	Damir Mikec	(Azerbaijan) 2015 Baku	Shooting	Men's 10 m air pistol
Gold	Damir Mikec	(Azerbaijan) 2015 Baku	Shooting	Men's 50 metre pistol
Gold	Men's junior national water polo team: Marko Janković Petar Kasum Jasmin Kolašinac Nikola Lukić Vladan Mitrović Dragoljub Rogač Kristian Šulc Stefan Todorovski Marko Tubić Petar Velkić Matija Vlahović Đorđe Vučinić Uroš Vuković	(Azerbaijan) 2015 Baku	Water polo	Men's tournament
Gold	Ivana Jandrić	(Azerbaijan) 2015 Baku	Sambo	Women's 68 kg
Silver	Viktor Nemeš	(Azerbaijan) 2015 Baku	Wrestling	Men's Greco-Roman 75 kg
Silver	Nikolina Moldovan; Olivera Moldovan	(Azerbaijan) 2015 Baku	Canoe sprint	Women's K-2 200m
Silver	Tijana Bogdanović	(Azerbaijan) 2015 Baku	Taekwondo	Women's 49 kg
Silver	Milica Mandić	(Azerbaijan) 2015 Baku	Taekwondo	Women's +67 kg
Bronze	Anja Crevar	(Azerbaijan) 2015 Baku	Swimming	Women's 400 m individual medley
Bronze	Marko Dragosavljević	(Azerbaijan) 2015 Baku	Canoe sprint	Men's K-1 200 metres
Bronze	Men's national 3x3 team: Marko Savić Dušan Domović Bulut Marko Ždero Dejan Majstorović	(Azerbaijan) 2015 Baku	3x3 basketball	Men's tournament
Bronze	Women's national volleyball team: Ana Bjelica Bianka Buša Marta Drpa Bojana Živković Tijana Malešević Brankica Mihajlović Slađana Mirković Brižitka Molnar Jelena Nikolić Mina Popović Silvija Popović Milena Rašić Maja Savić Jovana Stevanović	(Azerbaijan) 2015 Baku	Volleyball	Women's tournament
Gold	Zorana Arunović	(Belarus) 2019 Minsk	Shooting	Women's 10 m air pistol
Silver	Damir Mikec; Zorana Arunović	(Belarus) 2019 Minsk	Shooting	Mixed team 10 m air pistol
Silver	Stevan Mićić	(Belarus) 2019 Minsk	Wrestling	Men's 57 kg
Bronze	Dmitrij Gerasimenko	(Belarus) 2019 Minsk	Sambo	Men's 90 kg
Bronze	Vladimir Gajić	(Belarus) 2019 Minsk	Sambo	Men's +100 kg
Bronze	Mate Nemeš	(Belarus) 2019 Minsk	Wrestling	Men's Greco-Roman 67 kg
Gold	Milica Gardašević	(Poland) 2023 Kraków	Athletics	Women's long jump
Gold	Aleksandra Perišić	(Poland) 2023 Kraków	Taekwondo	Women's 67 kg
Gold	Aleksandra Krstić	(Poland) 2023 Kraków	Kickboxing	Women's full contact -52 kg
Silver	Nadica Božanić	(Poland) 2023 Kraków	Taekwondo	Women's 73 kg
Silver	Milica Novaković	(Poland) 2023 Kraków	Canoe sprint	Women's K-1 200 metres
Silver	Nikola Mitro; Maja Umićević	(Poland) 2023 Kraków	Teqball	Mixed doubles
Silver	Natalia Shadrina	(Poland) 2023 Kraków	Boxing	Women's 60kg - lightweight
Silver	Nikola Mitro; Bogdan Marojević	(Poland) 2023 Kraków	Teqball	Men's doubles
Silver	Vahid Abasov	(Poland) 2023 Kraków	Boxing	Men's 71kg - welterweight
Bronze	Marko Dragosavljević	(Poland) 2023 Kraków	Canoe sprint	Men's K-1 500 metres
Bronze	Marko Dragosavljević; Ervin Holpert	(Poland) 2023 Kraków	Canoe sprint	Men's K-2 500 metres
Bronze	Anđelo Džombeta; Marko Novaković; Vladimir Torubarov; Stefan Vrdoljak	(Poland) 2023 Kraków	Canoe sprint	Men's K-4 500 m
Bronze	Milica Novaković	(Poland) 2023 Kraków	Canoe sprint	Women's K-1 500 metres
Bronze	Stefan Takov	(Poland) 2023 Kraków	Taekwondo	Men's 74 kg
Bronze	Lazar Kovačević; Milenko Sebić; Milutin Stefanović	(Poland) 2023 Kraków	Shooting	Men's team 50m air rifle three positions
Bronze	Aleksandar Konovalov	(Poland) 2023 Kraków	Kickboxing	Men's full contact -75 kg

== Multiple medal winners ==
This is a list of people who have won two or more European Games medals, who represented Serbia at least once.

Athlete	Sport	Gender	Years	1st place, gold medalist(s)	2nd place, silver medalist(s)	3rd place, bronze medalist(s)	Total
Zorana Arunović	Shooting	F	2015–2023	2	1	0	3
Damir Mikec	Shooting	M	2015–2023	2	1	0	3
Milica Novaković	Canoe sprint	F	2015–2023	1	1	1	3
Marko Novaković	Canoe sprint	M	2015–2023	1	0	1	2
Nikola Mitro	Teqball	M	2023	0	2	0	2
Marko Dragosavljević	Canoe sprint	M	2015–2023	0	0	3	3

== See also ==
- Serbia at the Olympics
