= Andorra at the European Games =

- IOC code: AND
- NOC: Andorran Olympic Committee
- Website: www.coa.ad (in Catalan)
- Medals: Gold 0 Silver 0 Bronze 0 Total 0

European Games appearances (overview)
- 2015; 2019; 2023; 2027

Andorra participated at the inaugural edition of the European Games in 2015. However, Andorra is one of the four nations that have yet to win a medal at the European Games.

== Medal tables ==
=== Medals by Games ===
Games	Athletes	Gold	Silver	Bronze	Total	Rank
(Azerbaijan) 2015 Baku	31	0	0	0	0	–
(Belarus) 2019 Minsk	12	0	0	0	0	–
(Poland) 2023 Kraków-Małopolska	27	0	0	0	0	–
(Turkey) 2027 Istanbul	Future event					
Total		0	0	0	0	–

== See also ==
- Andorra at the Olympics
