= Cyprus at the European Games =

- IOC code: CYP
- NOC: Cyprus Olympic Committee
- Website: www.olympic.org.cy
- Medals: Gold 0 Silver 5 Bronze 2 Total 7

European Games appearances (overview)
- 2015; 2019; 2023; 2027

Cyprus participated at the inaugural edition of the European Games in 2015.

== Medal tables ==
=== Medals by Games ===
Games	Athletes	Gold	Silver	Bronze	Total	Rank
(Azerbaijan) 2015 Baku	22	0	1	0	1	36
(Belarus) 2019 Minsk	41	0	1	0	1	39
(Poland) 2023 Kraków–Małopolska	74	0	3	2	5	36
(Turkey) 2027 Istanbul	Future event					
Total		0	5	2	7	40

=== Medals by sports ===
Sport	Gold	Silver	Bronze	Total
Athletics	0	2	0	2
Shooting	0	2	0	2
Gymnastics	0	1	0	1
Karate	0	0	1	1
Taekwondo	0	0	1	1
Totals (5 entries)	0	5	2	7

== List of medallists ==
Medal	Name(s)	Games	Sport	Event
Silver	Georgios Achilleos; Andri Eleftheriou	(Azerbaijan) 2015 Baku	Shooting	Mixed Skeet
Silver	Marios Georgiou	(Belarus) 2019 Minsk	Gymnastics	Men's parallel bars

== See also ==
- Cyprus at the Commonwealth Games
- Cyprus at the Olympics
