= Czech Republic at the European Games =

- IOC code: CZE
- NOC: Czech Olympic Committee
- Website: www.olympic.cz
- Medals: Gold 9 Silver 17 Bronze 22 Total 48

European Games appearances (overview)
- 2015; 2019; 2023; 2027

Czech Republic participated at the inaugural edition of the European Games in 2015.

== Medal tables ==
=== Medals by Games ===
Games	Athletes	Gold	Silver	Bronze	Total	Rank
(Azerbaijan) 2015 Baku	126	0	2	5	7	32
(Belarus) 2019 Minsk	120	2	5	6	13	25
(Poland) 2023 Kraków-Małopolska	275	7	10	11	28	10
(Turkey) 2027 Istanbul	Future event					
Total		9	17	22	48	21

=== Medals by sports ===
Sport	Gold	Silver	Bronze	Total
Canoeing	4	2	4	10
Cycling	2	0	4	6
Shooting	1	7	7	15
Athletics	1	4	0	5
Modern pentathlon	1	0	0	1
Muaythai	0	1	2	3
Taekwondo	0	1	1	2
Gymnastics	0	1	0	1
Judo	0	1	0	1
Rugby sevens	0	0	1	1
Sport climbing	0	0	1	1
Table tennis	0	0	1	1
Volleyball	0	0	1	1
Totals (13 entries)	9	17	22	48

== List of medallists ==
Medal	Name(s)	Games	Sport	Event
Silver	Martin Fuksa	(Azerbaijan) 2015 Baku	Canoe sprint	Men's C1-1000m
Silver	Lukáš Krpálek	(Azerbaijan) 2015 Baku	Judo	Men's 100 kg
Bronze	Martin Fuksa	(Azerbaijan) 2015 Baku	Canoe sprint	Men's C1-200m
Bronze	Hana Matelová; Renáta Štrbíková; Iveta Vacenovská	(Azerbaijan) 2015 Baku	Table tennis	Women's team
Bronze	Přemysl Kubala; Jan Hadrava	(Azerbaijan) 2015 Baku	Beach Volleyball	Men's tournament
Bronze	Petr Vakoč	(Azerbaijan) 2015 Baku	Cycling	Men's road race
Bronze	Aneta Hladíková	(Azerbaijan) 2015 Baku	Cycling	Women's BMX
Gold	David Kostelecký	(Belarus) 2019 Minsk	Shooting	Men's trap
Gold	Tomáš Bábek	(Belarus) 2019 Minsk	Cycling	Men's 1 km time trial
Silver	Nikola Mazurová	(Belarus) 2019 Minsk	Shooting	Women's 10 metre air rifle
Silver	Tomáš Nýdrle	(Belarus) 2019 Minsk	Shooting	Men's skeet
Silver	Aneta Holasová	(Belarus) 2019 Minsk	Gymnastics	Women's floor
Silver	Jan Tesař; Barbora Malíková; Lada Vondrová; Michal Desenský	(Belarus) 2019 Minsk	Athletics	Mixed 4 x 400 m relay
Silver	Filip Sasínek; Diana Mezuliáníková; Patrik Šorm; Marcela Pírková	(Belarus) 2019 Minsk	Athletics	Mixed distance pursuit relay
Bronze	Aneta Brabcová; Filip Nepejchal	(Belarus) 2019 Minsk	Shooting	Mixed team 10 m air rifle
Bronze	Filip Nepejchal	(Belarus) 2019 Minsk	Shooting	Men's 10 m air rifle
Bronze	Jan Bárta	(Belarus) 2019 Minsk	Cycling	Men's time trial
Bronze	Nikola Mazurová	(Belarus) 2019 Minsk	Shooting	Women's 50 me rifle three positions
Bronze	Jarmila Machačová	(Belarus) 2019 Minsk	Cycling	Women's points race
Bronze	Barbora Šumová; Jakub Tomeček	(Belarus) 2019 Minsk	Shooting	Mixed team skeet

== See also ==
- Czech Republic at the Olympics
