= Switzerland at the European Games =

- IOC code: SUI
- NOC: Swiss Olympic Association
- Website: www.swissolympic.ch
- Medals: Gold 17 Silver 12 Bronze 20 Total 49

European Games appearances (overview)
- 2015; 2019; 2023; 2027

Switzerland participated at the inaugural edition of the European Games in 2015.

== Medal tables ==
=== Medals by Games ===
Games	Athletes	Gold	Silver	Bronze	Total	Rank
(Azerbaijan) 2015 Baku	130	7	4	4	15	13
(Belarus) 2019 Minsk	78	3	3	4	10	18
(Poland) 2023 Kraków-Małopolska	220	7	5	12	24	13
(Turkey) 2027 Istanbul	Future event					
Total	428	17	12	20	49	14

=== Medals by sports ===
Sport	Gold	Silver	Bronze	Total
Shooting	5	4	0	9
Cycling	4	4	5	13
Gymnastics	2	1	1	4
Athletics	2	0	2	4
Beach soccer	1	0	1	2
Diving	1	0	1	2
Triathlon	1	0	1	2
Volleyball	1	0	0	1
Karate	0	1	2	3
Canoe slalom	0	1	0	1
Fencing	0	1	0	1
Kickboxing	0	0	2	2
Archery	0	0	1	1
Badminton	0	0	1	1
Judo	0	0	1	1
Ski jumping	0	0	1	1
Sport climbing	0	0	1	1
Totals (17 entries)	17	12	20	49

== List of medallists ==
Medal	Name(s)	Games	Sport	Event
Gold	Nino Schurter	(Azerbaijan) 2015 Baku	Cycling	Men's Cross country
Gold	Jolanda Neff	(Azerbaijan) 2015 Baku	Cycling	Women's Cross country
Gold	Nicola Spirig	(Azerbaijan) 2015 Baku	Triathlon	Women's
Gold	Nina Betschart; Nicole Eiholzer	(Azerbaijan) 2015 Baku	Volleyball	Women's beach
Gold	Giulia Steingruber	(Azerbaijan) 2015 Baku	Gymnastics	Women's vault
Gold	Giulia Steingruber	(Azerbaijan) 2015 Baku	Gymnastics	Women's floor exercise
Gold	Heidi Diethelm Gerber	(Azerbaijan) 2015 Baku	Shooting	Women's 25 metre pistol
Silver	Lukas Flückiger	(Azerbaijan) 2015 Baku	Cycling	Men's Cross country
Silver	Kathrin Stirnemann	(Azerbaijan) 2015 Baku	Cycling	Women's Cross country
Silver	Giulia Steingruber	(Azerbaijan) 2015 Baku	Gymnastics	Women's artistic individual all-around
Silver	Sarah Hornung	(Azerbaijan) 2015 Baku	Shooting	Women's 10 metre air rifle
Bronze	Fabian Giger	(Azerbaijan) 2015 Baku	Cycling	Men's Cross country
Bronze	Giulia Steingruber	(Azerbaijan) 2015 Baku	Gymnastics	Women's balance beam
Bronze	Ludovic Chammartin	(Azerbaijan) 2015 Baku	Judo	Men's 60 kg
Bronze	David Graf	(Azerbaijan) 2015 Baku	Cycling	Men's BMX

== See also ==
- Switzerland at the Olympics
- European Youth Olympic Festival
- European Para Youth Games
