= Romania at the European Games =

- IOC code: ROU
- NOC: Romanian Olympic and Sports Committee
- Website: www.cosr.ro
- Medals: Gold 11 Silver 14 Bronze 14 Total 39

European Games appearances (overview)
- 2015; 2019; 2023; 2027

Romania participated at the inaugural edition of the European Games in 2015.

== Medal tables ==
=== Medals by Games ===
Games	Athletes	Gold	Silver	Bronze	Total	Rank
(Azerbaijan) 2015 Baku	147	3	5	4	12	18
(Belarus) 2019 Minsk	130	2	3	5	10	26
(Poland) 2023 Kraków-Małopolska	151	6	6	5	17	15
(Turkey) 2027 Istanbul	Future event					
Total		11	14	14	39	18

=== Medals by sports ===
Sport	Gold	Silver	Bronze	Total
Fencing	2	3	2	7
Table tennis	2	2	2	6
Teqball	2	1	0	3
Athletics	1	2	1	4
Canoe sprint	1	2	0	3
Cycling	1	0	0	1
Judo	1	0	0	1
Shooting	1	0	0	1
Gymnastics	0	3	3	6
Boxing	0	1	0	1
Sambo	0	0	4	4
Karate	0	0	1	1
Wrestling	0	0	1	1
Totals (13 entries)	11	14	14	39

== List of medallists ==
Medal	Name(s)	Games	Sport	Event
Gold	Ana Maria Brânză	(Azerbaijan) 2015 Baku	Fencing	Women's épée
Gold	Andreea Chițu	(Azerbaijan) 2015 Baku	Judo	Women's 52 kg
Gold	Ana Maria Brânză; Simona Gherman; Simona Pop; Amalia Tătăran	(Azerbaijan) 2015 Baku	Fencing	Women's team épée
Gold	Cătălin Chirilă; Victor Mihalachi	(Belarus) 2019 Minsk	Canoe sprint	Men's C2-1000m
Gold	Laura-Georgeta Coman	(Belarus) 2019 Minsk	Shooting	Women's 10 metre air rifle
Silver	Roxana Borha; Elena Meroniac	(Azerbaijan) 2015 Baku	Canoe sprint	Women's K2-500m
Silver	Andreea Iridon	(Azerbaijan) 2015 Baku	Gymnastics	Balance beam
Silver	Tiberiu Dolniceanu	(Azerbaijan) 2015 Baku	Fencing	Men's sabre
Silver	Lavinia Panaete; Bianca Gorgovan; Dacian Barna; Daniel Bocser; Lucian Savulescu	(Azerbaijan) 2015 Baku	Gymnastics	Mixed aerobic groups
Silver	Alin Badea; Mădălin Bucur; Tiberiu Dolniceanu; Iulian Teodosiu	(Azerbaijan) 2015 Baku	Fencing	Men's sabre
Silver	Dacian Barna; Andreea Bogati	(Belarus) 2019 Minsk	Gymnastics	Mixed aerobic pairs
Silver	Bernadette Szőcs; Daniela Dodean; Elizabeta Samara	(Belarus) 2019 Minsk	Table tennis	Women's team
Silver	Ovidiu Ionescu; Bernadette Szőcs	(Belarus) 2019 Minsk	Table tennis	Mixed doubles
Bronze	Marius Berbecar	(Azerbaijan) 2015 Baku	Gymnastics	Parallel bars
Bronze	Andreea Iridon	(Azerbaijan) 2015 Baku	Gymnastics	Uneven bars
Bronze	Daniela Hondiu	(Azerbaijan) 2015 Baku	Sambo	Women's 60 kg
Bronze	Simona Gherman	(Azerbaijan) 2015 Baku	Fencing	Women's épée
Bronze	Dacian Barna; Gabriel Bocşer; Andreea Bogati; Marian Broţei; Mihai Popa	(Belarus) 2019 Minsk	Gymnastics	Mixed aerobic groups
Bronze	Daniela Poroineanu	(Belarus) 2019 Minsk	Sambo	Women's 56 kg
Bronze	Anda Vâlvoi	(Belarus) 2019 Minsk	Sambo	Women's 64 kg
Bronze	Alina Păunescu	(Belarus) 2019 Minsk	Sambo	Women's +80 kg
Bronze	Kriszta Incze	(Belarus) 2019 Minsk	Wrestling	Women's freestyle 62 kg

== See also ==
- Romania at the Olympics
