= All-time European Games medal table =

European Games
- Medal tables; Medalists; Ceremonies

Games
- 2015; 2019; 2023; 2027

Organisations
- Charter; EOC; NOCs

Other EOC Games
- Small States of Europe

An all-time medal table for all European Games from 2015, is tabulated below. The EOC itself does not publish all-time tables, and publishes unofficial tables only per single Games.

The results are attributed to the IOC country code as currently displayed by the IOC database. Usually, a single code corresponds to a single National Olympic Committee (NOC).

The medal table is based on information provided by the International Olympic Committee (IOC) and is consistent with IOC convention in its published medal tables. By default, the table is ordered by the number of gold medals the athletes from a nation have won, where nation is an entity represented by a National Olympic Committee (NOC). The number of silver medals is taken into consideration next and then the number of bronze medals. If nations are still tied, equal ranking is given and they are listed alphabetically.

== European Games (2015-2023) ==
European Games medal table
Rank	NOC	Gold	Silver	Bronze	Total
1	Russia (RUS)	123	64	86	273
2	Italy (ITA)	58	67	63	188
3	Ukraine (UKR)	45	43	51	139
4	Germany (GER)	43	39	73	155
5	Great Britain (GBR)	36	30	53	119
6	France (FRA)	35	41	57	133
7	Spain (ESP)	34	30	36	100
8	Belarus (BLR)	33	27	51	111
9	Azerbaijan (AZE)	29	27	39	95
10	Netherlands (NED)	25	31	21	77
11	Hungary (HUN)	21	20	35	76
12	Poland (POL)	18	28	38	84
13	Turkey (TUR)	17	19	46	82
14	Switzerland (SUI)	17	12	20	49
15	Denmark (DEN)	14	10	13	37
16	Georgia (GEO)	13	17	25	55
17	Serbia (SRB)	12	12	14	38
18	Romania (ROU)	11	14	14	39
19	Austria (AUT)	10	15	14	39
20	Belgium (BEL)	10	10	10	30
21	Czech Republic (CZE)	9	17	22	48
22	Portugal (POR)	9	17	15	41
23	Slovenia (SLO)	8	10	6	24
24	Croatia (CRO)	8	9	15	32
25	Bulgaria (BUL)	7	15	18	40
26	Sweden (SWE)	7	10	12	29
27	Ireland (IRL)	7	7	12	26
28	Greece (GRE)	6	11	18	35
29	Israel (ISR)	6	8	10	24
30	Latvia (LAT)	6	5	6	17
31	Norway (NOR)	6	4	9	19
32	Lithuania (LTU)	6	4	8	18
33	Armenia (ARM)	5	5	5	15
34	Finland (FIN)	4	1	7	12
35	Slovakia (SVK)	3	7	9	19
36	Estonia (EST)	2	4	5	11
37	Albania (ALB)	2	0	0	2
38	Moldova (MDA)	1	2	7	10
39	Kosovo (KOS)	1	1	2	4
40	Cyprus (CYP)	0	5	2	7
41	Luxembourg (LUX)	0	2	3	5
42	Bosnia and Herzegovina (BIH)	0	2	0	2
43	North Macedonia (MKD)	0	1	2	3
43	San Marino (SMR)	0	1	2	3
45	Montenegro (MNE)	0	1	1	2
46	Monaco (MON)	0	1	0	1
Totals (46 entries)		707	706	955	2,368

Four member nations of the European Olympic Committees have as yet failed to win any medals: Andorra, Iceland, Liechtenstein, and Malta. All of these nations compete in the EOC event for smaller NOCs, the Games of the Small States of Europe.

=== Doping Changes ===
- Athletics at the 2015 European Games
- Wrestling at the 2019 European Games – Men's Greco-Roman 130 kg

== European Championships (2018-2022) ==
Rank	Nation	Gold	Silver	Bronze	Total
1	Great Britain (GBR)	50	45	39	134
2	Germany (GER)	39	37	37	113
3	Russia (RUS)	31	19	16	66
4	Italy (ITA)	29	35	47	111
5	France (FRA)	24	31	37	92
6	Netherlands (NED)	24	22	25	71
7	Hungary (HUN)	18	11	9	38
8	Poland (POL)	17	22	21	60
9	Ukraine (UKR)	13	21	14	48
10	Spain (ESP)	12	17	22	51
11	Switzerland (SUI)	11	9	13	33
12	Romania (ROU)	11	6	8	25
13	Greece (GRE)	10	7	2	19
14	Norway (NOR)	10	3	4	17
15	Belgium (BEL)	9	8	12	29
16	Sweden (SWE)	9	5	6	20
17	Portugal (POR)	6	4	2	12
18	Croatia (CRO)	5	2	3	10
19	Austria (AUT)	4	3	5	12
20	Belarus (BLR)	4	2	3	9
21	Czech Republic (CZE)	3	7	4	14
22	Lithuania (LTU)	3	6	5	14
23	Slovenia (SLO)	3	6	3	12
24	Israel (ISR)	3	2	3	8
25	Denmark (DEN)	2	7	5	14
25	Turkey (TUR)	2	7	5	14
27	Ireland (IRL)	2	3	3	8
28	Finland (FIN)	2	1	3	6
–	Authorised Neutral Athletes (ANA)^{[1]}	1	3	2	6
29	Serbia (SRB)	1	2	1	4
30	Armenia (ARM)	1	1	1	3
31	Iceland (ISL)	1	1	0	2
31	Latvia (LAT)	1	1	0	2
33	Albania (ALB)	1	0	0	1
33	Cyprus (CYP)	1	0	0	1
35	Slovakia (SVK)	0	2	1	3
36	Bulgaria (BUL)	0	1	1	2
37	Azerbaijan (AZE)	0	1	0	1
37	Moldova (MDA)	0	1	0	1
37	Montenegro (MNE)	0	1	0	1
40	Estonia (EST)	0	0	2	2
41	Luxembourg (LUX)	0	0	1	1
Totals (41 entries)		363	362	365	1,090

Notes

^[1] Not included in the official medal table.

== European Games + European Championships (2015-2023) ==
European Games (2015-2023) + European Championships (multi-sport event) (2018-2022)

Rank	Nation	Gold	Silver	Bronze	Total
1	Russia (RUS)	154	83	102	339
2	Italy (ITA)	87	102	110	299
3	Great Britain (GBR)	86	75	92	253
4	Germany (GER)	82	76	110	268
5	France (FRA)	59	72	94	225
6	Ukraine (UKR)	58	64	65	187
7	Netherlands (NED)	49	53	46	148
8	Spain (ESP)	46	47	58	151
9	Hungary (HUN)	39	31	44	114
10	Belarus (BLR)	37	29	54	120
11	Poland (POL)	35	50	59	144
12	Azerbaijan (AZE)	29	28	39	96
13	Switzerland (SUI)	28	21	33	82
14	Romania (ROU)	22	20	22	64
15	Turkey (TUR)	19	26	51	96
16	Belgium (BEL)	19	18	22	59
17	Greece (GRE)	16	18	20	54
18	Denmark (DEN)	16	17	18	51
19	Sweden (SWE)	16	15	18	49
20	Norway (NOR)	16	7	13	36
21	Portugal (POR)	15	21	17	53
22	Austria (AUT)	14	18	19	51
23	Georgia (GEO)	13	17	25	55
24	Serbia (SRB)	13	14	15	42
25	Croatia (CRO)	13	11	18	42
26	Czech Republic (CZE)	12	24	26	62
27	Slovenia (SLO)	11	16	9	36
28	Ireland (IRL)	9	10	15	34
29	Israel (ISR)	9	10	13	32
29	Lithuania (LTU)	9	10	13	32
31	Bulgaria (BUL)	7	16	19	42
32	Latvia (LAT)	7	6	6	19
33	Armenia (ARM)	6	6	6	18
34	Finland (FIN)	6	2	10	18
35	Slovakia (SVK)	3	9	10	22
36	Albania (ALB)	3	0	0	3
37	Estonia (EST)	2	4	7	13
38	Cyprus (CYP)	1	5	2	8
39	Moldova (MDA)	1	3	7	11
–	Authorised Neutral Athletes (ANA)^{[1]}	1	3	2	6
40	Kosovo (KOS)	1	1	2	4
41	Iceland (ISL)	1	1	0	2
42	Luxembourg (LUX)	0	2	4	6
43	Montenegro (MNE)	0	2	1	3
44	Bosnia and Herzegovina (BIH)	0	2	0	2
45	North Macedonia (MKD)	0	1	2	3
45	San Marino (SMR)	0	1	2	3
47	Monaco (MON)	0	1	0	1
Totals (47 entries)		1,070	1,068	1,320	3,458

Notes

^[1] Not included in the official medal table.

== See also ==
- 2015 European Games medal table
- 2019 European Games medal table
- 2023 European Games medal table
- List of 2015 European Games medal winners
- List of 2019 European Games medal winners
- List of 2023 European Games medal winners
- European Championships (multi-sport event)
- European Youth Games
- European Youth Para Games
- European Para Championships
- Games of the Small States of Europe
- European Masters Games
- European Maccabiah Games
- TAFISA European Sport for All Games
- European Universities Games
- European Company Games
- European Police and Fire Games
- European Heart and Lung Transplant Championships
- European Transplant and Dialysis Sports Games
- Virtus European Games
- Trisome European Games
- Special Olympics European Games
