= Nicolas D'Oriano =

French swimmer (born 1997)

Personal information
- Nationality: French
- Born: 5 May 1997 (age 29) La Seyne-sur-Mer, France

Sport
- Sport: Swimming

Nicolas D'Oriano (born 5 May 1997) is a French swimmer. He competed in the men's 1500 metre freestyle event at the 2016 Summer Olympics.
