= Netherlands at the European Games =

- Flag of the Netherlands
- IOC code: NED
- NOC: NOC*NSF
- Website: www.nocnsf.nl
- Medals: Gold 25 Silver 31 Bronze 21 Total 77

European Games appearances (overview)
- 2015; 2019; 2023; 2027

Netherlands has participated in all three editions of the European Games since its inception in 2015. The country also planned to host the second edition of the Games, however, later the idea was dropped due to a lack of funds.

The Dutch team has won a total of 77 medals including 25 gold, 31 silver, and 21 bronze medals across the three editions of the Games. It has consistently been ranked in the top ten in the medals table, with the best finish of fifth in the 2019 edition.

== History ==
Netherlands has consistently sent teams to multi-nation international sporting events since its first participation in the 1900 Summer Olympics. Nederlands Olympisch Comité* Nederlandse Sport Federatie (NOC*NSF) is the National Olympic Committee of the country recognized by the International Olympic Committee.

=== 2015 European Games ===
Netherlands made its debut at the European Games during the 2015 European Games inaugural edition held in Baku, Azerbaijan. The country sent a delegation of 117 athletes led by chef-de-mission Jeroen Bijl. Taekwondo player Reshmie Oogink served as the country's flag bearer during the opening ceremony and cyclist Twan van Gendt carried the flag during closing ceremony. The team won 29 medals including eight gold medals, and was ranked ninth in the overall medal table. Netherlands won three gold medals in Judo, while winning one gold each in five other sports.

=== 2019 European Games ===
The country was initially awarded the rights to host the second edition of the Games. With a projected budget of US$143 million, the NOC*NSF asked for a federal funding of US$69 million for the Games. As the Government of Netherlands did not provide support for the funding, the nation pulled out from hosting the event. The hosting rights were later awarded to Minsk, Belarus. About 3,500 athletes from 50 countries competed in 200 medal events across 15 sports in the Games. The Dutch delegation consisted of 90 members. Boxer Nouchka Fontijn was the flag-bearer during the opening ceremony. The team won 29 medals including nine gold medals, and was ranked fifth in the overall medal table. The team won 15 medals including seven gold medals in the cycling event.

=== 2023 European Games ===
Netherlands participated in the third consecutive European Games held in Kraków and Małopolska in Poland. The Dutch team consisted of 186 athletes led by formed judoka Mark Huizinga as Chef de Mission. Isabel Barnard (beach handball) and Sheyi Adetunji (3x3 basketball) were the flag-bearers during the opening ceremony. The team won 19 medals including eight gold medals, and was ranked tenth in the overall medal table. The team won ten medals including four gold medals in the athletics events.

== Medal table ==
Netherlands at the European Games
Games	Athletes	Gold	Silver	Bronze	Total	Rank
2015 Baku	117	8	12	9	29	9
2019 Minsk	90	9	13	7	29	5
2023 Kraków and Małopolska	186	8	6	5	19	10
2027 Istanbul	Future event					
Total		25	31	21	77	10

== See also ==
- Netherlands at the Olympics
