= Germany at the European Games =

- IOC code: GER
- NOC: German Olympic Sports Confederation
- Website: www.dosb.de (in German, English, and French)
- Medals Ranked 4th: Gold 43 Silver 39 Bronze 73 Total 155

European Games appearances (overview)
- 2015; 2019; 2023; 2027

Germany participated at three editions of the European Games.

== Medal table ==
Games	Athletes	Gold	Silver	Bronze	Total	Rank
(Azerbaijan) 2015 Baku	265	16	17	33	66	4
(Belarus) 2019 Minsk	149	7	6	13	26	7
(Poland) 2023 Krakow	333	20	16	27	63	4
(Turkey) 2027 Istanbul	Future event					
Total		43	39	73	155	4

== See also ==
- Germany at the Olympics
