= Badminton at the 2015 European Games =

- Venue: Baku Sports Hall
- Dates: 22–28 June 2015
- Competitors: 160

Badminton at the 2015 European Games in Baku took place from 22 to 28 June 2015 at Baku Sports Hall. The competition was held over a seven-day period and include five medal events in men’s and women’s singles, men’s and women’s doubles and mixed doubles. Approximately 160 athletes competed.

== Qualification ==
32 quota places are available for each singles event, and 16 places (involving 32 players) are available for each pairs event.

The Badminton World Federation (BWF) ranking list of 26 March 2015 will be used for deciding eligibility for the event. There will be no separate qualification event.

The BWF ranking list on that date will be used to form a European ranking list by removing all players who are not qualified to represent any European NOC and this European ranking list will then be used to allocate places.

Singles players ranked 1 to 8 in the European ranking list for each singles event will be considered in turn and are eligible to enter, to a maximum of two per nation in each event. Singles players ranked 9 and lower in the European ranking list for each singles event will be considered in turn and are eligible to enter to a maximum of one per nation in that event. Therefore, for example, if an NOC has players ranked 1,4 and 7 in the European rankings, they will be eligible to enter two players; if they have players ranked 2 and 10, they will be eligible to enter one player.

Doubles pairs ranked 1 to 4 in the European ranking list for each doubles event will be considered in turn and are eligible to enter to a maximum of two pairs per nation in each event. Doubles pairs ranked 5 and lower in the European ranking list for each doubles event will be considered in turn and are eligible to enter one pair per nation in that event. Therefore, for example, if an NOC has pairs ranked 1 and 4 in the European rankings, they will be eligible to enter two pairs; if they have pairs ranked 3 and 12, they will be eligible to enter one pair.

Azerbaijan, as host, is entitled to enter two players; a maximum of one player/pair per event will be allowed. If additional Azeri players qualify under the regulations, they may also be entered. A number of 'universality' places will also be awarded to ensure a larger number of nations can compete in the event.

== Medal table ==
Rank	Nation	Gold	Silver	Bronze	Total
1	Denmark	3	1	1	5
2	Bulgaria	1	0	1	2
2	Spain	1	0	1	2
4	Russia	0	2	0	2
5	Belgium	0	1	0	1
5	France	0	1	0	1
7	Germany	0	0	3	3
8	Ireland	0	0	2	2
9	Lithuania	0	0	1	1
9	Turkey	0	0	1	1
Totals (10 entries)		5	5	10	20

== Medalists ==
Event	Gold	Silver	Bronze
Men's singles	Pablo Abián; Spain	Emil Holst; Denmark	Dieter Domke; Germany
Men's singles	Pablo Abián; Spain	Emil Holst; Denmark	Kęstutis Navickas; Lithuania
Men's doubles	Denmark; Mathias Boe; Carsten Mogensen	Russia; Vladimir Ivanov; Ivan Sozonov	Germany; Raphael Beck; Andreas Heinz
Men's doubles	Denmark; Mathias Boe; Carsten Mogensen	Russia; Vladimir Ivanov; Ivan Sozonov	Ireland; Joshua Magee; Sam Magee
Women's singles	Line Kjaersfeldt; Denmark	Lianne Tan; Belgium	Petya Nedelcheva; Bulgaria
Women's singles	Line Kjaersfeldt; Denmark	Lianne Tan; Belgium	Clara Azurmendi; Spain
Women's doubles	Bulgaria; Gabriela Stoeva; Stefani Stoeva	Russia; Ekaterina Bolotova; Evgeniya Kosetskaya	Denmark; Lena Grebak; Maria Helsbøl
Women's doubles	Bulgaria; Gabriela Stoeva; Stefani Stoeva	Russia; Ekaterina Bolotova; Evgeniya Kosetskaya	Turkey; Özge Bayrak; Neslihan Yiğit
Mixed doubles	Denmark; Niclas Nøhr; Sara Thygesen	France; Gaetan Mittelheisser; Audrey Fontaine	Germany; Raphael Beck; Kira Kattenbeck
Mixed doubles	Denmark; Niclas Nøhr; Sara Thygesen	France; Gaetan Mittelheisser; Audrey Fontaine	Ireland; Sam Magee; Chloe Magee
