= Swimming at the European Games =

Swimming at the 1st European Games
- Venue: Baku Aquatics Centre
- Dates: 23–27 June 2015
- Competitors: 526

Swimming events were included at the inaugural 2015 European Games took place at the Baku Aquatics Centre, Baku 42 events were contested in long course conditions. Swimming was not included in the earliest list of sports confirmed for the 2015 Games, as the European swimming authorities at that stage were minded not to take part. However, following negotiations with the organising authorities, a compromise was reached whereby, in 2015, these events were for junior swimmers only - in effect, under 18 for men, under 16 for women.

In effect, therefore, the swimming portion of the 2015 European Games doubled as the 2015 European Junior Swimming Championships. Swimming events did not return for the 2019 Games in Minsk.

A number of non-Olympic distances have been raced, in addition to a full Olympic programme. The 50 metre sprint in backstroke, breaststroke, and butterfly will be held for both genders, the 800 metre freestyle for men, the 1500 metre freestyle for women and mixed gender 4 x 100 metre relays, both freestyle and medley.

== Summary ==
Games	Year	Events	Best Nation
I	2015	42	Russia
II	2019	not contested	
III	2023	not contested	

== List of Medalists ==
=== Men's events ===
==== 50 metres freestyle ====
Event	Gold	Silver	Bronze
2015 Baku	Ziv Kalontorov; Israel	Giovanni Izzo; Italy	Aleksei Brianskiy; Russia

==== 100 metres freestyle ====
Event	Gold	Silver	Bronze
2015 Baku	Duncan Scott; Great Britain	Alessandro Miressi; Italy	Vladislav Kozlov; Russia

==== 200 metres freestyle ====
Event	Gold	Silver	Bronze
2015 Baku	Duncan Scott; Great Britain	Cameron Kurle; Great Britain	Elisei Stepanov; Russia

==== 400 metres freestyle ====
Event	Gold	Silver	Bronze
2015 Baku	Paul Hentschel; Germany	Dimitrios Dimitriou; Greece	Ernest Maksumov; Russia

==== 800 metres freestyle ====
Event	Gold	Silver	Bronze
2015 Baku	Nicolas D'Oriano; France	Marcos Rodríguez; Spain	Henning Mühlleitner; Germany

==== 1500 metres freestyle ====
Event	Gold	Silver	Bronze
2015 Baku	Nicolas D'Oriano; France	Ernest Maksumov; Russia	Marc Hinawi; Israel

==== 50 metres backstroke ====
Event	Gold	Silver	Bronze
2015 Baku	Filipp Shopin; Russia	Marek Ulrich; Germany	Andrii Khloptsov; Ukraine

==== 100 metres backstroke ====
Event	Gold	Silver	Bronze
2015 Baku	Luke Greenbank; Great Britain	Filipp Shopin; Russia	Marek Ulrich; Germany

==== 200 metres backstroke ====
Event	Gold	Silver	Bronze
2015 Baku	Luke Greenbank; Great Britain	Mikita Tsmyh; Belarus	Roman Larin; Russia

==== 50 metres breaststroke ====
Event	Gold	Silver	Bronze
2015 Baku	Andrius Šidlauskas; Lithuania	Nikola Obrovac; Croatia	Tobias Bjerg; Denmark

==== 100 metres breaststroke ====
Event	Gold	Silver	Bronze
2015 Baku	Anton Chupkov; Russia	Andrius Šidlauskas; Lithuania	Charlie Attwood; Great Britain

==== 200 metres breaststroke ====
Event	Gold	Silver	Bronze
2015 Baku	Anton Chupkov; Russia	Kirill Mordashev; Russia	Luke Davies; Great Britain

==== 50 metres butterfly ====
Event	Gold	Silver	Bronze
2015 Baku	Andrii Khloptsov; Ukraine	Paweł Sendyk; Poland	Daniil Pakhomov; Russia

==== 100 metres butterfly ====
Event	Gold	Silver	Bronze
2015 Baku	Daniil Pakhomov; Russia	Alberto Lozano; Spain	Daniil Antipov; Russia

==== 200 metres butterfly ====
Event	Gold	Silver	Bronze
2015 Baku	Daniil Pakhomov; Russia	Giacomo Carini; Italy	Matthias Marsau; France

==== 200 metres individual medley ====
Event	Gold	Silver	Bronze
2015 Baku	Sebastian Steffan; Austria	Jarvis Parkinson; Great Britain	Martyn Walton; Great Britain

==== 400 metres individual medley ====
Event	Gold	Silver	Bronze
2015 Baku	Nikolay Sokolov; Russia	Igor Balyberdin; Russia	Karol Zbutowicz; Poland

==== 4 x 100 metres freestyle relay ====
Event	Gold	Silver	Bronze
2015 Baku	Great Britain (GBR); Duncan Scott; Martyn Walton; Daniel Speers; Cameron Kurle; Thomas Fannon	Italy (ITA); Alessandro Miressi; Giovanni Izzo; Ivano Vendrame; Alessandro Bori; Manuel Frigo	Russia (RUS); Vladislav Kozlov; Aleksei Brianskiy; Elisei Stepanov; Igor Shadrin; Georg Gutmann; Sergei Sudakov

==== 4 x 200 metres freestyle relay ====
Event	Gold	Silver	Bronze
2015 Baku	Russia (RUS); Aleksandr Prokofev; Nikolay Snegirev; Ernest Maksumov; Elisei Stepanov; Igor Shadrin; Daniil Antipov	Great Britain (GBR); Duncan Scott; Martyn Walton; Kyle Chisholm; Cameron Kurle	Germany (GER); Paul Hentschel; Henning Mühlleitner; Konstantin Walter; Moritz Brandt; Alexander Lohmar; Thore Bermel

==== 4 x 100 metres medley relay ====
Event	Gold	Silver	Bronze
2015 Baku	Russia (RUS); Filipp Shopin; Anton Chupkov; Daniil Pakhomov; Vladislav Kozlov; Roman Larin; Egor Suchkov; Daniil Antipov; Aleksei Brianskiy	Great Britain (GBR); Luke Greenbank; Charlie Attwood; Duncan Scott; Martyn Walton; Joe Hulme; Luke Davies; Kyle Chisholm; Cameron Kurle	Poland (POL); Jakub Skierka; Jacek Arentewicz; Michał Chudy; Paweł Sendyk; Damian Chrzanowski; Michał Brzuś

=== Women's events ===
==== 50 metres freestyle ====
Event	Gold	Silver	Bronze
2015 Baku	Maria Kameneva; Russia	Marrit Steenbergen; Netherlands	Julie Kepp Jensen; Denmark

==== 100 metres freestyle ====
Event	Gold	Silver	Bronze
2015 Baku	Marrit Steenbergen; Netherlands	Arina Openysheva; Russia	Maria Kameneva; Russia

==== 200 metres freestyle ====
Event	Gold	Silver	Bronze
2015 Baku	Arina Openysheva; Russia	Marrit Steenbergen; Netherlands	Leonie Kullmann; Germany

==== 400 metres freestyle ====
Event	Gold	Silver	Bronze
2015 Baku	Arina Openysheva; Russia	Leonie Kullmann; Germany	Anastasiya Kirpichnikova; Russia

==== 800 metres freestyle ====
Event	Gold	Silver	Bronze
2015 Baku	Holly Hibbott; Great Britain	Anastasiya Kirpichnikova; Russia	Marina Castro Atalaya; Spain

==== 1500 metres freestyle ====
Event	Gold	Silver	Bronze
2015 Baku	Sveva Schiazzano; Italy	Janka Juhász; Hungary	Marina Castro Atalaya; Spain

==== 50 metres backstroke ====
Event	Gold	Silver	Bronze
2015 Baku	Caroline Pilhatsch; Austria	Pauline Mahieu; France	Maria Kameneva; Russia

==== 100 metres backstroke ====
Event	Gold	Silver	Bronze
2015 Baku	Polina Egorova; Russia	Maria Kameneva; Russia	Pauline Mahieu; France

==== 200 metres backstroke ====
Event	Gold	Silver	Bronze
2015 Baku	Polina Egorova; Russia	Maxime Wolters; Germany	Maryna Kolesnykova; Ukraine

==== 50 metres breaststroke ====
Event	Gold	Silver	Bronze
2015 Baku	Maria Astashkina; Russia	Laura Kelsch; Germany	Nolwenn Hervé; France

==== 100 metres breaststroke ====
Event	Gold	Silver	Bronze
2015 Baku	Maria Astashkina; Russia	Giuila Verona; Italy	Daria Chikunova; Russia

==== 200 metres breaststroke ====
Event	Gold	Silver	Bronze
2015 Baku	Maria Astashkina; Russia	Giuila Verona; Italy	Layla Black; Great Britain

==== 50 metres butterfly ====
Event	Gold	Silver	Bronze
2015 Baku	Polina Egorova; Russia	Caroline Pilhatsch; Austria	Julie Kepp Jensen; Denmark

==== 100 metres butterfly ====
Event	Gold	Silver	Bronze
2015 Baku	Polina Egorova; Russia	Amelia Clynes; Great Britain	Ilektra Lebl; Greece Laura Stephens; Great Britain

==== 200 metres butterfly ====
Event	Gold	Silver	Bronze
2015 Baku	Julia Mrozinski; Germany	Elisa Scarpa Vidal; Italy	Boglárka Bonecz; Hungary

==== 200 metres butterfly ====
Event	Gold	Silver	Bronze
2015 Baku	Maxime Wolters; Germany	Ilaria Cusinato; Italy	Abbie Wood; Great Britain

==== 400 metres butterfly ====
Event	Gold	Silver	Bronze
2015 Baku	Abbie Wood; Great Britain	Ilaria Cusinato; Italy	Anja Crevar; Serbia

==== 4 x 100 metres freestyle relay ====
Event	Gold	Silver	Bronze
2015 Baku	Russia (RUS); Arina Openysheva; Vasilissa Buinaia; Olesia Cherniatina; Maria Kameneva; Polina Egorova; Anastasiya Kirpichnikova	Netherlands (NED); Pien Schravesande; Frederique Janssen; Laura van Engelen; Marrit Steenbergen; Josien Wijkhuijs	Great Britain (GBR); Darcy Deakin; Madeleine Crompton; Hannah Featherstone; Georgia Coates; Holly Hibbott

==== 4 x 200 metres freestyle relay ====
Event	Gold	Silver	Bronze
2015 Baku	Russia (RUS); Anastasiya Kirpichnikova; Arina Openysheva; Olesia Cherniatina; Irina Krivonogova; Maria Kameneva; Mariana Petrova	Netherlands (NED); Laura van Engelen; Frederique Janssen; Marieke Tienstra; Marrit Steenbergen	Great Britain (GBR); Hannah Featherstone; Darcy Deakin; Holly Hibbott; Georgia Coates; Madeleine Crompton

==== 4 x 100 metres medley relay ====
Event	Gold	Silver	Bronze
2015 Baku	Russia (RUS); Maria Kameneva; Maria Astashkina; Polina Egorova; Arina Openysheva; Daria Chikunova; Alexandra Chesnokova; Vasilissa Buinaia	Netherlands (NED); Iris Tjonk; Tes Schouten; Josein Wijkhuis; Marrit Steenbergen; Marieke Tienstra; Frederique Janssen	Great Britain (GBR); Rebecca Sherwin; Layla Black; Amelia Clynes; Georgia Coates; Emma Cain; Abbie Wood; Darcy Deakin

=== Mixed events ===
==== 4 x 100 metres freestyle relay ====
Event	Gold	Silver	Bronze
2015 Baku	Russia (RUS); Vladislav Kozlov; Elisei Stepanov; Mariia Kameneva; Arina Openysheva; Igor Shadrin; Aleksei Brianskiy; Vasilissa Buinaia; Olesia Cherniatina	Great Britain (GBR); Duncan Scott; Martyn Walton; Darcy Deakin; Georgia Coates; Cameron Kurle; Madeleine Crompton; Daniel Speers; Hannah Featherstone	Germany (GER); Alexander Lohmar; Leonie Kullmann; Katrin Gottwald; Konstantin Walter; Hana van Loock

==== 4 x 100 metres medley relay ====
Event	Gold	Silver	Bronze
2015 Baku	Russia (RUS); Mariia Kameneva; Anton Chupkov; Daniil Pakhomov; Arina Openysheva; Filip Shopin; Daria Chikunova; Roman Shevliakov; Vasilissa Buinaia	Great Britain (GBR); Luke Greenbank; Charlie Attwood; Amelia Clynes; Georgia Coates; Joe Litchfield; Luke Davies; Abbie Wood; Hannah Featherstone	Germany (GER); Maxine Wolters; Leo Schmidt; Johannes Tesch; Katrin Gottwald; Marek Ulrich; Laura Kelsch; Hana van Loock

== All-time Medal table ==
Russia is by far the most successful swimming nation at the European Games with 23 gold medals out of 42 events. Great Britain and Germany follow with seven and three gold medals respectively.

Rank	Nation	Gold	Silver	Bronze	Total
1	Russia (RUS)	23	7	12	42
2	Great Britain (GBR)	7	7	9	23
3	Germany (GER)	3	4	6	13
4	France (FRA)	2	1	3	6
5	Austria (AUT)	2	1	0	3
6	Italy (ITA)	1	9	0	10
7	Netherlands (NED)	1	5	0	6
8	Lithuania (LTU)	1	1	0	2
9	Ukraine (UKR)	1	0	2	3
10	Israel (ISR)	1	0	1	2
11	Spain (ESP)	0	2	2	4
12	Poland (POL)	0	1	2	3
13	Greece (GRE)	0	1	1	2
13	Hungary (HUN)	0	1	1	2
15	Belarus (BLR)	0	1	0	1
15	Croatia (CRO)	0	1	0	1
17	Denmark (DEN)	0	0	3	3
18	Serbia (SRB)	0	0	1	1
Totals (18 entries)		42	42	43	127
