= Cycling at the 2015 European Games =

Cycling contest at 2015 European Games

- Venue: BMX Velopark (BMX); MTB Velopark (mountain biking)
- Dates: 16–27 June
- Competitors: 346

Three disciplines of cycling were contested at the 2015 European Games: road cycling, mountain biking, and BMX racing. A total of eight medal events were held.

== Medal summary ==
=== Road cycling ===
Event	Gold	Silver	Bronze
Men's road race	Luis León Sánchez; Spain	Andriy Grivko; Ukraine	Petr Vakoč; Czech Republic
Women's road race	Alena Amialiusik; Belarus	Katarzyna Niewiadoma; Poland	Anna van der Breggen; Netherlands
Men's time trial	Vasil Kiryienka; Belarus	Stef Clement; Netherlands	Luis León Sánchez; Spain
Women's time trial	Ellen van Dijk; Netherlands	Ganna Solovei; Ukraine	Annemiek van Vleuten; Netherlands

=== Mountain biking ===
Event	Gold	Silver	Bronze
Men's cross-country	Nino Schurter; Switzerland	Lukas Flückiger; Switzerland	Fabian Giger; Switzerland
Women's cross-country	Jolanda Neff; Switzerland	Kathrin Stirnemann; Switzerland	Maja Włoszczowska; Poland

=== BMX ===
Event	Gold	Silver	Bronze
Men	Joris Daudet; France	Twan van Gendt; Netherlands	David Graf; Switzerland
Women	Simone Christensen; Denmark	Magalie Pottier; France	Aneta Hladíková; Czech Republic

== Medal table ==
Rank	Nation	Gold	Silver	Bronze	Total
1	Switzerland	2	2	2	6
2	Belarus	2	0	0	2
3	Netherlands	1	2	2	5
4	France	1	1	0	2
5	Spain	1	0	1	2
6	Denmark	1	0	0	1
7	Ukraine	0	2	0	2
8	Poland	0	1	1	2
9	Czech Republic	0	0	2	2
Totals (9 entries)		8	8	8	24

== Courses ==
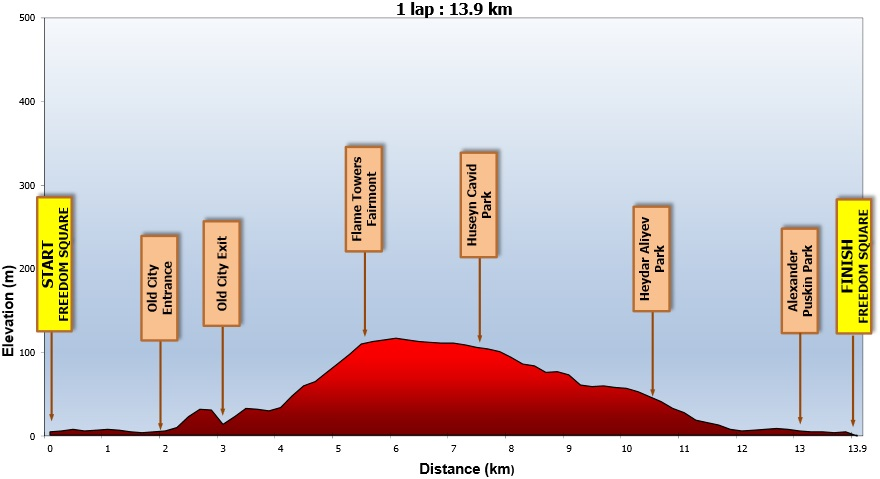
Road Race

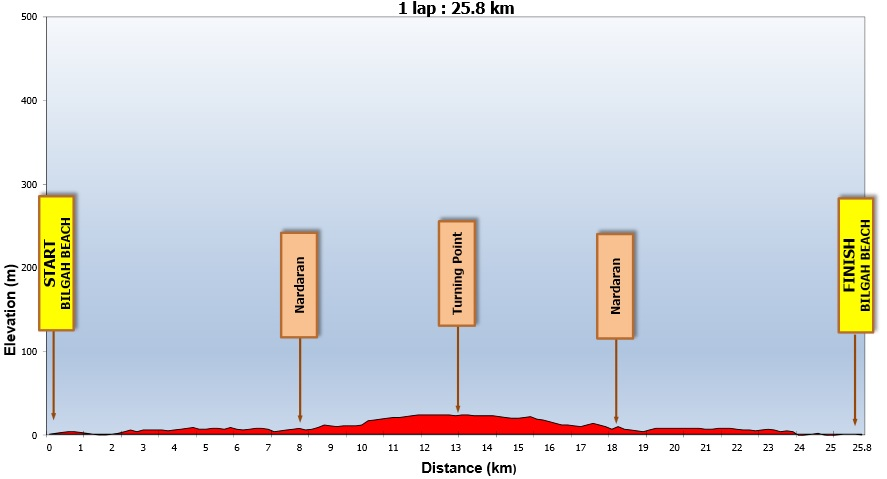
Time Trial
