= Taekwondo at the 2015 European Games =

Taekwondo competition

- Venue: Crystal Hall complex
- Location: Baku, Azerbaijan
- Dates: 16–19 June
- Competitors: 127 from 37 nations

Taekwondo competitions at the 2015 European Games in Baku were held between 16 and 19 June 2015 at the Crystal Hall complex in Baku. The competition consisted of four weight events in each gender; a total of 8 medal events.

== Qualification ==
Qualification will be based on the World Taekwondo Federation world ranking list on 31 March 2015, with 112 places being awarded through that system, 14 in each event. In addition, 8 'Universality' places, 1 per event, will be allocated in the individual competition to ensure a spread of nations can compete, and hosts Azerbaijan will also be entitled to one fighter per event.

National Olympic Committees, (NOCs) are restricted to a maximum of eight entries in total, and two entries in any single event.

== 2016 Summer Olympics ==
Taekwondo events that count towards Olympic ranking and thus qualification are given a 'G' ranking from G-1 to G-10, with G-10 being the most valuable. Taekwondo at the European Games will have a G-4 ranking event status; therefore ranking points towards qualification for the Rio 2016 Olympic Games will be available at the 2015 European Games.

== Medal table ==
* Host nation (Azerbaijan)

Rank	Nation	Gold	Silver	Bronze	Total
1	Azerbaijan*	3	1	1	5
2	Great Britain	2	0	1	3
3	Russia	1	2	2	5
4	Portugal	1	0	1	2
5	France	1	0	0	1
6	Serbia	0	2	0	2
7	Croatia	0	1	3	4
7	Spain	0	1	3	4
9	Poland	0	1	0	1
10	Sweden	0	0	2	2
11	Belgium	0	0	1	1
11	Germany	0	0	1	1
11	Turkey	0	0	1	1
Totals (13 entries)		8	8	16	32

== Medalists ==
=== Men ===
Event	Gold	Silver	Bronze
58 kg	Rui Bragança; Portugal	Jesús Tortosa; Spain	Si Mohamed Ketbi; Belgium
58 kg	Rui Bragança; Portugal	Jesús Tortosa; Spain	Levent Tuncat; Germany
68 kg	Aykhan Taghizade; Azerbaijan	Karol Robak; Poland	Joel González; Spain
68 kg	Aykhan Taghizade; Azerbaijan	Karol Robak; Poland	Aleksey Denisenko; Russia
80 kg	Milad Beigi; Azerbaijan	Albert Gaun; Russia	Lutalo Muhammad; Great Britain
80 kg	Milad Beigi; Azerbaijan	Albert Gaun; Russia	Júlio Ferreira; Portugal
+80 kg	Radik Isayev; Azerbaijan	Vladislav Larin; Russia	Vedran Golec; Croatia
+80 kg	Radik Isayev; Azerbaijan	Vladislav Larin; Russia	Daniel Ros Gomez; Spain

=== Women ===
Event	Gold	Silver	Bronze
49 kg	Charlie Maddock; Great Britain	Tijana Bogdanović; Serbia	Patimat Abakarova; Azerbaijan
49 kg	Charlie Maddock; Great Britain	Tijana Bogdanović; Serbia	Lucija Zaninović; Croatia
57 kg	Jade Jones; Great Britain	Ana Zaninović; Croatia	Nikita Glasnović; Sweden
57 kg	Jade Jones; Great Britain	Ana Zaninović; Croatia	Eva Calvo; Spain
67 kg	Anastasia Baryshnikova; Russia	Farida Azizova; Azerbaijan	Elin Johansson; Sweden
67 kg	Anastasia Baryshnikova; Russia	Farida Azizova; Azerbaijan	Nur Tatar; Turkey
+67 kg	Gwladys Epangue; France	Milica Mandić; Serbia	Iva Radoš; Croatia
+67 kg	Gwladys Epangue; France	Milica Mandić; Serbia	Olga Ivanova; Russia

== Participating nations ==
A total of 127 athletes from 37 nations competed in taekwondo at the 2015 European Games.

NOC	Men				Women				Total athletes
NOC	58 kg	68 kg	80 kg	+80 kg	49 kg	57 kg	67 kg	+67 kg	Total athletes
Albania						X			1
Armenia			X						1
Azerbaijan	X	X	X	X	X	X	X	X	8
Belarus	X								1
Belgium	X	X			X				3
Bulgaria		X	X						2
Croatia		X		X	X	X	X	X	6
Cyprus		X		X	X	X			4
Denmark					X				1
Finland						X			1
France	X	X	X	X	X	X	X	X	8
Germany	X		X	X		X	X	X	6
Great Britain	X	X	X	X	X	X		X	7
Greece	X			X	X		X		4
Hungary					X	X			2
Iceland	X								1
Ireland							X		1
Israel	X								1
Italy		X	X	X	X				4
Kosovo			X						1
Moldova	X	X	X						3
Montenegro								X	1
Netherlands				X			X	X	3
Norway			X					X	2
Poland	X	X	X	X			X	X	6
Portugal	X	X	X			X			4
Romania				X					1
Russia	X	X	X	X	X	X	X	X	8
San Marino		X							1
Serbia	X		X		X	X	X	X	6
Slovakia					X				1
Slovenia		X		X			X	X	4
Spain	X	X	X	X	X	X	X	X	8
Sweden						X	X	X	3
Switzerland						X	X		2
Turkey	X	X	X	X	X	X	X	X	8
Ukraine					X		X	X	3
37 NOCs	16	16	16	15	16	16	16	16	127
