= 2019 European Games medal table =

The 2019 European Games was a multi-sport event held in Minsk, Belarus from 21 to 30 June 2019.

Athletes from 43 NOCs won medals, leaving 7 NOCs without a medal, and 34 of them won at least one gold medal. Russia led the medal table of the 2nd European Games. They led all the medal categories, winning the most gold medals (44, nearly 25 % of total gold medals), the most silver medals (24), the most bronze medals (41) and the most medals overall (109). Bosnia and Herzegovina and Luxembourg won their first medals on European Games.

Baku 2015	Minsk 2019	Krakow 2023

== Medal table ==
The medal table is based on information provided by the International Olympic Committee (IOC) and is consistent with IOC convention in its published medal tables. By default, the table is ordered by the number of gold medals the athletes from a nation have won, where nation is an entity represented by a National Olympic Committee (NOC). The number of silver medals is taken into consideration next and then the number of bronze medals. If nations are still tied, equal ranking is given and they are listed alphabetically.

* Host nation (Belarus)

2019 European Games medal table
Rank	NOC	Gold	Silver	Bronze	Total
1	Russia (RUS)	44	24	41	109
2	Belarus (BLR)*	23	16	29	68
3	Ukraine (UKR)	16	17	19	52
4	Italy (ITA)	13	15	13	41
5	Netherlands (NED)	9	13	7	29
6	Georgia (GEO)	7	9	14	30
7	Germany (GER)	7	6	13	26
8	France (FRA)	6	9	13	28
9	Great Britain (GBR)	6	9	8	23
10	Azerbaijan (AZE)	5	10	13	28
11	Armenia (ARM)	5	3	3	11
12	Spain (ESP)	5	2	6	13
13	Hungary (HUN)	4	6	9	19
14	Belgium (BEL)	4	1	1	6
14	Slovenia (SLO)	4	1	1	6
16	Bulgaria (BUL)	3	7	8	18
17	Portugal (POR)	3	6	6	15
18	Switzerland (SUI)	3	3	4	10
19	Israel (ISR)	3	3	1	7
20	Greece (GRE)	3	2	4	9
21	Denmark (DEN)	3	2	3	8
22	Poland (POL)	3	1	10	14
23	Sweden (SWE)	3	1	4	8
24	Turkey (TUR)	2	6	7	15
25	Czech Republic (CZE)	2	5	6	13
26	Romania (ROU)	2	3	5	10
27	Latvia (LAT)	2	3	2	7
28	Croatia (CRO)	2	1	5	8
29	Lithuania (LTU)	2	1	0	3
30	Finland (FIN)	2	0	1	3
31	Austria (AUT)	1	2	4	7
31	Ireland (IRL)	1	2	4	7
33	Serbia (SRB)	1	2	3	6
34	Kosovo (KOS)	1	1	1	3
35	Estonia (EST)	0	2	3	5
36	Moldova (MDA)	0	1	4	5
37	Slovakia (SVK)	0	1	3	4
38	Luxembourg (LUX)	0	1	2	3
39	Bosnia and Herzegovina (BIH)	0	1	0	1
39	Cyprus (CYP)	0	1	0	1
39	Montenegro (MNE)	0	1	0	1
42	Norway (NOR)	0	0	2	2
43	San Marino (SMR)	0	0	1	1
Totals (43 entries)		200	200	283	683

Seven nations which failed to win any medals: Albania, Andorra, Iceland, Liechtenstein, Malta, Monaco and North Macedonia.

== See also ==
- All-time European Games medal table
- List of 2019 European Games medal winners
