= Gymnastics at the 2015 European Games – Qualification =

The qualification standards are set by the European Union of Gymnastics (UEG).

== Qualification timeline ==
Event	Date	Venue
2013 Rhythmic Gymnastics European Championships (individuals)	31 May–2 June 2013	(Austria) Vienna
2013 Aerobic Gymnastics European Championships	4–11 November 2013	(France) Arques
2014 European Trampoline Championships	7–13 April 2014	(Portugal) Guimarães
2014 European Women's Artistic Gymnastics Championships	12–18 May 2014	(Bulgaria) Sofia
2014 European Men's Artistic Gymnastics Championships	19–25 May 2014	(Bulgaria) Sofia
2014 Rhythmic Gymnastics European Championships (groups)	9–15 June 2014	(Azerbaijan) Baku
2014 Acrobatic Gymnastics World Championships	10–12 July 2014	(France) Levallois

== Qualification summary ==
Nation	Acrobatic		Aerobic^{1}		Artistic		Rhythmic		Trampoline		Total
Nation	Pairs	Groups	Pairs	Groups	Men	Women	Individual	Group	Men	Women	Total
Austria					3	3	2				8
Azerbaijan	2	3	X	5	3	3	2	5	2	2	27
Belarus		3			3	3	2	6	2	2	21
Belgium	2	3			3	3			1		12
Bulgaria	2				3	3	2	5		2	17
Croatia					1	3					4
Cyprus					1	1					2
Czech Republic				5	3	3			2		13
Denmark					1	3					4
Finland				5	3			6			14
France		3	X	5	3	3	1	5	2	2	24
Georgia					1	1	1		1	1	5
Germany	2	3	2		3	3		6	2	1	22
Great Britain	2	3		5	3	3			1	2	19
Greece					3	3	1	5		2	14
Hungary			X	5	3	3	1				12
Iceland					1	3					4
Ireland					3	3					6
Israel		3			1	1	2	5			12
Italy			1	5	3	3		6	1		19
Latvia					3	3					6
Lithuania					1	1					2
Macedonia					1						1
Netherlands					3	3			1		7
Norway					3	3					6
Poland	2	3			3	3			2		13
Portugal	2	3	2		3	1			2	2	15
Romania			X	5	3	3	1				12
Russia	2	3	X	5	3	3	2	6	2	2	28
Serbia					3	1					4
Slovakia					1	1					2
Slovenia					1	1					2
Spain			X	5	3	3	1	6		1	19
Sweden									2		2
Switzerland					3	3		5	2	2	15
Turkey					3	1					4
Ukraine	2	3	1	5	3	3	2	5	2	2	28
37 NOCs	18	33	61		88	84	20	71	27	23	425

== Acrobatic ==
=== Mixed Pairs ===
Event	Criterion	Athletes per NOC	Qualified
Host quota		2	Azerbaijan
2014 World Championships	Top 10	2	Russia; Great Britain; Belgium; France; Belarus; Ukraine; Portugal; Germany; Poland; Bulgaria
TOTAL		22	11

=== Women's Groups ===
Event	Criterion	Athletes per NOC	Qualified
Host quota		3	Azerbaijan
2014 World Championships	Top 10	3	Russia; Great Britain; Belgium; France; Belarus; Portugal; Israel; Ukraine; Germany; Poland
TOTAL		33	11

== Aerobic ==
=== Mixed Pairs ===
Event	Criterion	Athletes per NOC	Qualified
Host quota		2^{1}	Azerbaijan
2013 European Championships	Top 9	2^{1}	Russia; Romania; Italy; France; Spain; Hungary; Portugal; Ukraine; Germany
TOTAL		12	10

^{1}One gymnast from Pairs must compete in the Group to make up required Group numbers (6), thus lower numbers.

=== Groups ===
Event	Criterion	Athletes per NOC	Qualified
Host quota		5	Azerbaijan
2013 European Championships	Top 10	5	France; Romania; Russia; Hungary; Italy; Great Britain; Spain; Finland; Czech Republic; Ukraine
TOTAL		55	11

== Artistic ==
=== Men ===
Event	Criterion	Athletes per NOC	Qualified
Teams
Host quota		3	Azerbaijan
2014 European Championships	Team places 1-25	3	Great Britain; Russia; Ukraine; Belarus; France; Netherlands; Germany; Romania; Switzerland; Italy; Belgium; Finland; Spain; Greece; Hungary; Bulgaria; Ireland; Portugal; Turkey; Latvia; Austria; Poland; Czech Republic; Serbia; Norway
TOTAL		78	26
Individuals
2014 European Championships	Individual all-round placings, 12 best non-qualified NOC's	1	Armenia; Lithuania; Slovakia; Denmark; Georgia; Slovenia; Sweden; Cyprus; Monaco; Macedonia; Iceland; Croatia
TOTAL		90	38

=== Women ===
Event	Criterion	Athletes per NOC	Qualified
Teams
Host quota		3	Azerbaijan
2014 European Championships	Team places 1-25	3	Great Britain; Romania; Russia; Italy; Germany; Switzerland; Belgium; Spain; Netherlands; Poland; France; Sweden; Hungary; Austria; Czech Republic; Belarus; Ukraine; Ireland; Croatia; Greece; Iceland; Norway; Latvia; Denmark; Bulgaria
TOTAL		78	26
Individuals
2014 European Championships	Individual all-round placings, 12 best non-qualified NOC's	1	Portugal; Slovakia; Finland; Turkey; Lithuania; Serbia; Israel; Georgia; Cyprus; Slovenia; Luxembourg
TOTAL		89	37

== Rhythmic ==
=== Individual ===
Event	Criterion	Athletes per NOC	Qualified
Host quota		2	Azerbaijan
2013 European Championships		2	Austria; Belarus; Bulgaria; Israel; Russia; Ukraine
2013 European Championships		1	France; Georgia; Greece; Hungary; Romania; Spain
TOTAL		20	13

=== Group ===
Event	Criterion	Athletes per NOC	Qualified
Host quota		6	Azerbaijan
2014 European Championships	Top 11	6	Russia; Italy; Israel; Bulgaria; Spain; France; Ukraine; Switzerland; Greece; Germany; Finland
TOTAL		72	12

== Trampoline ==
=== Men's ===
Event	Criterion	Athletes per NOC	Qualified
Host quota		2	Azerbaijan
2014 European Championships	Top 6 in team event	2	Russia; Portugal; Belarus; France; Ukraine; Poland
2014 European Championships	Top 4 in synchro finals	2	Switzerland; Germany; Sweden; Czech Republic
2014 European Championships	Top 4 in individual event	1	Great Britain; Georgia; Italy; Netherlands; Belgium
TOTAL		27	16

- NOC's with two gymnasts qualified will compete in synchro and individual events.

=== Women's ===
Event	Criterion	Athletes per NOC	Qualified
Host quota		2	Azerbaijan
2014 European Championships	Top 6 in team event	2	Great Britain; Russia; Belarus; Portugal; France; Switzerland
2014 European Championships	Top 4 in synchro finals	2	Ukraine; Germany; Netherlands; Greece
2014 European Championships	Top 4 in individual event	1	Spain; Bulgaria; Belgium; Georgia
TOTAL		26	15

- NOC's with two gymnasts qualified will compete in synchro and individual events.
