= Shooting at the 2015 European Games – Qualification =

The bulk (305 from 330) of the qualification quota was to be awarded based on European rankings as of December 31, 2014.

The maximum number of athletes per country was 2 in each event. In case there were more than 2 athletes among the top ranked, the extra places were added to the pool of universality, awarded to ensure a larger number of nations enjoyed representation. In addition, regardless of ranking, as hosts Azerbaijan was guaranteed 9 host quota places, 5 for men and 4 for women.

There was to be no separate quota places in respect of the mixed events. Rather, only nations with entries in both the relevant men's and women's events will be able to compete with existing shooters.

== Quota per event ==
Quota places were based on the European ranking as of December 31, 2014. These places were awarded to athletes who were among the:

- 30 top-ranked in trap and skeet (men);
- 28 top-ranked in all individual pistol and rifle events (men and women);
- 18 top-ranked in trap and skeet (women), and double trap (men).

== Qualification summary ==
Nation	Pistol					Rifle					Shotgun					Total	
Nation	Men's			Women's		Men's			Women's		Men's			Women's		Total	
Nation	AP60	RFP	FP	AP40	SP	AR60	FR3x40	FR60PR	AR40	STR3x20	DT150	TR125	SK125	TR75	SK75	Quotas	Athletes
Austria							1	1				1	1			2	
Azerbaijan	1	1											1		1	9	9
Belarus	2		1			2	2	2								2	
Belgium								1								1	
Bulgaria	1					1	1									1	
Croatia			1					2				2				2	
Czech Republic	1	2	1									2	1			4	
Cyprus													2		2	4	
Denmark							1	1					1			1	
Estonia		1														1	
Finland						1					1		2	2	1	6	
France	1	2	1			2	2	1					2	1	1	5	
Germany	1	2	1			2	2	2			2	1	2	2	1	9	
Great Britain								1	1	1	2	2	2	2	2	13	
Greece	1												1			2	
Hungary		1				2	1				2	1				3	
Iceland	1		1													1	
Ireland												1				1	
Israel		1				1	1									1	
Italy	2	2	2			2	1	1			2	2	2	2	2	12	
Lithuania						1							1			2	2
Luxembourg												1				1	
Netherlands						1							1			1	
Norway		1				1	2	2					1			1	
Poland	1	2	1					1				2			1	4	
Portugal	1		1									2				3	
Romania						1										1	
Russia	2	2	2			2	2	2			2	1	2	1	1	9	
San Marino												1		2		3	
Serbia	2		2			2	1	1								2	
Slovakia	1		2								1	2	1	1	2	8	
Slovenia							1					1				1	
Spain	1	1	1			1		1				2	1	2		6	
Sweden								1			1		2		1	4	
Switzerland						1	2	1					1			1	
Turkey	2		2									1				3	
Ukraine	2	2	2			2	2	2					1			3	
? NOC's	23	20	21								13	25	27	15	15		
