= Canoe sprint at the 2015 European Games – Qualification =

The sole qualification event for the canoe sprint events at the 2015 European Games will be the 2014 Canoe Sprint European Championships in Brandenburg 11–13 July 2014.

== Qualification summary ==
NOC	Men									Women						Total	
NOC	C1 200	C1 1000	C2 1000	K1 200	K1 1000	K1 5000	K2 200	K2 1000	K4 1000	K1 200	K1 500	K1 5000	K2 200	K2 500	K4 500	Boats	Athletes
Austria					X	X				X	X	X				4	2
Azerbaijan	X	X	X	X	X	X				X	X	X				9	7
Belarus	X	X	X	X	X	X	X	X	X	X	X	X	X	X		14	13
Belgium				X	X	X					X	X				5	3
Bosnia and Herzegovina					X	X				X						3	2
Bulgaria				X	X		X				X	X				5	4
Croatia				X	X	X				X	X	X				6	2
Cyprus				X	X	X										3	1
Czech Republic	X	X	X	X	X	X		X	X	X		X		~~X~~	X	11	14
Denmark					X	X				~~X~~	~~X~~					2	1
Finland					X	X		X			X	X				5	4
France	X	X		X	X	X	X	X		X	X				X	10	12
Georgia	X			X						X	X	X				5	3
Germany	X	X	X	X	X	X	X	X	X	X	X	X	X	X	X	15	20
Great Britain	X	X		X	X	X	X	X		X	X	X	X	X	X	13	15
Greece				X	X	X				X	X					5	3
Hungary	X	X	X	X	X	X	X	X	X	X	X	X	X	X	X	15	16
Ireland	X			X			X	X		X	X	X				7	5
Italy	X	X		X	X	X	X	X		X	X	X	X	X	X	13	9
Latvia	X				X					X	X					4	4
Lithuania	X			X			X	X		X	X					6	7
Macedonia					X	X										2	1
Moldova	X	X								X	X	X				5	2
Netherlands				~~X~~	~~X~~						X	X				2	1
Norway					X	X					~~X~~					2	1
Poland	X	X	X	X	X	X	X		X	X	X	X	X	X	X	14	16
Portugal	X			X	X	X		X	X	X	X		X	X	X	11	13
Romania		X	X	X	X				X			X	~~X~~	X	X	8	13
Russia	X	~~X~~	X	X	X	X	X	X	X	X	X	X	X	X	X	14	19
Serbia		~~X~~		X	X	X	X	X	X	X	X	X	X	X	X	12	13
Slovakia	X	X		X	X	X	X	X	X	X		X	X	X		12	15
Slovenia					X	X		X		X	X					5	4
Spain	X	X	X	X	X	X	X	X		X	X	X	X	X		13	13
Sweden				X			X			X	~~X~~	~~X~~			X	4	7
Switzerland					X	X										2	1
Turkey	X	X		X	X	X				X	X	X	X	X		10	6
Ukraine	X		X	X	X	X	X	X		X	X	X	X	X	X	13	14
Total quotas	20	14	10	27	31	29	16	17	10	27	27	24	13	14	13	289	286

== Qualification rules ==
Each National Olympic Committee (NOC) is restricted to one boat per event, a maximum of fifteen boats, and therefore a maximum of 26 qualified athletes. Azerbaijan, as host, is guaranteed entry of three athletes, in three boats; K1-1000 metres and C1-1000 metres for men, and the K1-500 metres for women.

The bulk of qualification (all places other than host and 'universality' places) will be awarded by virtue of performance in the 2014 European Canoe Sprint Championships. Places will be awarded to NOCs rather than individual athletes. Each event has a quota of places available as set out below:

Event	Quota (boats/athletes)	Event	Quota (boats/athletes)
Men		Women	
K1 200m	23 (23)	K1 200m	18 (18)
K1 1000m	23 (23)	K1 500m	18 (18)
K1 5000m	13 (13)	K1 5000m	13 (13)
K2 200m	14 (28)	K2 200m	14 (28)
K2 1000m	14 (28)	K2 500m	14 (28)
K4 1000m	10 (40)	K4 500m	10 (40)
C1 200m	15 (15)	—	
C1 1000m	15 (15)	—	
C2 1000m	10 (20)	—	

In the event an athlete qualifies in two boats (e.g. K1-1000m and K2-1000m), he or she will be allowed to compete in both events, but will only take up the quota place in the larger boat; the unused quota place in the smaller boat will then be redistributed. Where a boat qualifies in two events of the same boat size but over two distances (e.g. 200m and 1000m in K2), that boat will be allowed to compete in both events, but will only take up the quota place in the longer event; the unused quota place in the shorter event will then be redistributed. In both cases this will allow for more boats to compete in a particular event than there are quota places.

== Qualified countries ==
=== Men's events ===
Place	K1 200m	K1 1000m	K1 5000m	K2 200m	K2 1000m	K4 1000m	C1 200m	C1 1000m	C2 1000m
1	SRB	BLR	GER	GER	GER	CZE	RUS	GER	HUN
2	GBR	DEN	DEN	RUS	FRA	SVK	ESP	HUN	RUS
3	RUS	GER	POR	LTU	SVK	POR	POR	~~RUS~~	CZE
4	ESP	BUL	HUN	GBR	RUS	HUN	GER	BLR	GER
5	SWE	POR	BLR	ESP	LTU	RUS	UKR	ITA	ESP
6	HUN	BEL	SRB	FRA	HUN	SRB	AZE	SVK	BLR
7	LTU	POL	SLO	HUN	UKR	BLR	HUN	MDA	AZE
8	LAT	SRB	FRA	SWE	SLO	POL	BLR	CZE	POL
9	SVK	FRA	UKR	UKR	ESP	ROU	SVK	FRA	ROU
10	BEL	CZE	CZE	POL	IRL	GER	GEO	ROU	UKR
11	ROU	SLO	ESP	SRB	CZE	—	LTU	GBR	—
12	POL	HUN	RUS	SVK	SRB	—	CZE	ESP	—
13	FRA	SVK	SUI	ITA	GBR	—	POL	POL	—
14	GER	SUI	—	BUL	FIN	—	FRA	~~SRB~~	—
15	CZE	ESP	—	—	—	—	IRL	AZE^{*}	—
16	ITA	UKR	—	—	—	—	—	—	—
17	IRL	NOR	—	—	—	—	—	—	—
18	UKR	GBR	—	—	—	—	—	—	—
19	BLR	FIN	—	—	—	—	—	—	—
20	GEO	~~NED~~	—	—	—	—	—	—	—
21	AZE	RUS	—	—	—	—	—	—	—
22	~~NED~~	CYP	—	—	—	—	—	—	—
23	TUR	AZE^{*}	—	—	—	—	—	—	—
Reall.	BUL	CRO	BEL	BLR	POR	—	LAT	TUR	—
Reall.	CRO	AUT	FIN	IRL	ITA	—	GBR	—	—
Reall.	POR	TUR	AUT	—	BLR	—	ITA	—	—
Reall.	CYP	ITA	POL	—	—	—	MDA	—	—
Reall.	GRE	ROU	SVK	—	—	—	TUR	—	—
Reall.	—	GRE	ITA	—	—	—	—	—	—
Reall.	—	BIH	BIH	—	—	—	—	—	—
Reall.	—	MKD	GRE	—	—	—	—	—	—
Reall.	—	IRL	IRL	—	—	—	—	—	—
Reall.	—	—	CRO	—	—	—	—	—	—
Reall.	—	—	AZE	—	—	—	—	—	—
Reall.	—	—	CYP	—	—	—	—	—	—
Reall.	—	—	GBR	—	—	—	—	—	—
Reall.	—	—	MKD	—	—	—	—	—	—
Reall.	—	—	NOR	—	—	—	—	—	—
Reall.	—	—	TUR	—	—	—	—	—	—
Boats	27	31	29	16	17	10	20	14	10

=== Women's events ===
Place	K1 200m	K1 500m	K1 5000m	K2 200m	K2 500m	K4 500m
1	HUN	HUN	HUN	BLR	HUN	HUN
2	RUS	GER	BLR	HUN	POL	POL
3	POR	POR	BUL	GBR	SRB	RUS
4	FRA	AUT	GBR	SRB	RUS	GER
5	POL	POL	ITA	GER	GER	UKR
6	SWE	~~DEN~~	SRB	RUS	GBR	SWE
7	GER	GBR	CZE	POL	BLR	FRA
8	SVK	RUS	ROU	POR	SVK	ROU
9	AUT	ESP	GER	SVK	ITA	POR
10	SRB	~~SWE~~	UKR	~~ROU~~	UKR	GBR
11	~~DEN~~	FRA	~~SWE~~	UKR	ROU	—
12	GBR	BUL	NED	ITA	~~CZE~~	—
13	UKR	~~NOR~~	POL	ESP	POR	—
14	ROU	SLO	—	TUR	TUR	—
15	BLR	ITA	—	—	—	—
16	ITA	UKR	—	—	—	—
17	GRE	NED	—	—	—	—
18	SLO	AZE^{*}	—	—	—	—
Reall.	ESP	GRE	IRL	—	ESP	ITA
Reall.	GEO	ROU	RUS	—	—	SRB
Reall.	LAT	SRB	BEL	—	—	CZE
Reall.	CRO	LAT	ESP	—	—	—
Reall.	AZE	FIN	AUT	—	—	—
Reall.	TUR	TUR	SVK	—	—	—
Reall.	LTU	IRL	TUR	—	—	—
Reall.	BIH	GEO	CRO	—	—	—
Reall.	IRL	BLR	AZE	—	—	—
Reall.	CZE	CRO	FIN	—	—	—
Reall.	—	BEL	GEO	—	—	—
Reall.	—	LTU	MDA	—	—	—
Boats	27	27	24	13	14	13

^* Host quota

- Italic: National federation has qualified a boat but the athlete that did this was already counted in another boat.
