= Swimming at the 2015 European Games – Women's 200 metre freestyle =

Women's 200 metre freestyle at the 2015 European Games
- Venue: Aquatic Palace
- Dates: 25–26 June
- Competitors: 53 from 28 nations
- Winning time: 1:58.22

Medalists
gold medal	Arina Openysheva	Russia
silver medal	Marrit Steenbergen	Netherlands
bronze medal	Leonie Kullmann	Germany

The women's 200 metre freestyle event at the 2015 European Games in Baku took place on 25 and 26 June at the Aquatic Palace.

== Results ==
=== Heats ===
The heats were started on 25 June at 09:50.

Rank	Heat	Lane	Name	Nationality	Time	Notes
1	6	4	Arina Openysheva	Russia	2:02.06	Q, GR
2	6	5	Holly Hibbott	Great Britain	2:02.24	Q
3	5	4	Marrit Steenbergen	Netherlands	2:02.47	Q
4	4	3	Hannah Featherstone	Great Britain	2:02.68	Q
5	5	3	Darcy Deakin	Great Britain	2:03.44	
6	5	2	Laura van Engelen	Netherlands	2:03.47	Q
7	6	6	Katrin Gottwald	Germany	2:03.61	Q
8	5	5	Anastasia Kirpichnikova	Russia	2:03.69	Q
9	4	5	Marta Cano	Spain	2:03.85	Q
10	4	7	Marte Løvberg	Norway	2:04.14	Q
11	4	4	Leonie Kullmann	Germany	2:04.27	Q
12	6	7	Marieke Tienstra	Netherlands	2:04.55	
13	5	6	Barbora Seemanová	Czech Republic	2:04.67	Q
14	6	7	Frederique Janssen	Netherlands	2:04.73	
15	6	2	Olesia Cherniatina	Russia	2:04.74	
16	6	0	Lia Neubert	Germany	2:04.90	
17	5	1	Irina Krivonogova	Russia	2:05.05	
18	6	3	Madeleine Crompton	Great Britain	2:05.08	
19	4	6	Rachel Bethel	Ireland	2:05.37	Q
20	1	3	Elisa Scarpa Vidal	Italy	2:05.42	Q
20	5	0	Signe Bro	Denmark	2:05.42	Q
22	2	5	Matea Sumajstorčić	Croatia	2:05.61	Q
23	4	1	Carmen San Nicolás	Spain	2:05.68	Q
24	3	5	Giovanna La Cava	Italy	2:05.73	
25	5	8	Josephine Holm	Denmark	2:05.95	
26	3	6	Zoe Preisig	Switzerland	2:06.22	
27	6	8	Paula Ruiz	Spain	2:06.23	
28	5	9	Anna Pirovano	Italy	2:06.26	
29	4	9	Lena Opatril	Austria	2:06.48	
30	3	4	Esther Huete	Spain	2:06.72	
31	3	9	Sveva Schiazzano	Italy	2:07.61	
32	3	0	Emily Gantriis	Denmark	2:07.73	
33	6	1	Julia Mrozinski	Germany	2:07.86	
34	2	3	Elena Giovannini	San Marino	2:07.88	
35	2	2	Greta Gataveckaitė	Lithuania	2:08.20	
36	4	2	Aino Otava	Finland	2:08.31	
37	6	9	Lucia Šimovičová	Slovakia	2:08.38	
38	4	8	Zeynep Odabaşı	Turkey	2:08.55	
39	3	2	Kertu Ly Alnek	Estonia	2:08.59	
40	3	3	Magdalena Roman	Poland	2:08.60	
41	3	7	Sunneva Dögg Friðriksdóttir	Iceland	2:08.69	
42	3	8	Maria Cabral	Portugal	2:08.91	
43	3	1	Ana Rita Faria	Portugal	2:09.03	
44	2	4	Dóra Sztankovics	Hungary	2:09.19	
45	2	0	Anna-Marie Benešová	Czech Republic	2:09.68	
46	2	6	Hanna Eriksson	Sweden	2:09.74	
47	2	9	Julia Bruneau	Finland	2:09.77	
48	2	7	Julia Klonowska	Poland	2:10.51	
49	2	8	Danielle Hill	Ireland	2:10.74	
50	4	0	Valeriia Timchenko	Ukraine	2:11.03	
51	1	5	Lamija Medošević	Bosnia and Herzegovina	2:12.41	
52	2	1	Safiya Akhapkina	Belarus	2:16.83	
53	1	4	Diana Basho	Albania	2:21.66	

=== Semifinals ===
The semifinals were started on 25 June at 17:30.

==== Semifinal 1 ====
Rank	Lane	Name	Nationality	Time	Notes
1	6	Marta Cano	Spain	2:01.99	Q
2	4	Holly Hibbott	Great Britain	2:02.02	Q
3	3	Katrin Gottwald	Germany	2:02.18	q
4	2	Leonie Kullmann	Germany	2:02.36	q
5	5	Hannah Featherstone	Great Britain	2:03.54	
6	1	Signe Bro	Denmark	2:04.00	
7	8	Carmen San Nicolás	Spain	2:04.88	
8	7	Rachel Bethel	Ireland	2:04.89	

==== Semifinal 2 ====
Rank	Lane	Name	Nationality	Time	Notes
1	4	Arina Openysheva	Russia	1:59.42	Q, GR
2	5	Marrit Steenbergen	Netherlands	2:01.60	Q
3	6	Anastasia Kirpichnikova	Russia	2:02.10	q
4	7	Barbora Seemanová	Czech Republic	2:02.16	q
5	3	Laura van Engelen	Netherlands	2:02.39	
6	2	Marte Løvberg	Norway	2:02.85	
7	8	Matea Sumajstorčić	Croatia	2:04.94	
8	1	Elisa Scarpa Vidal	Italy	2:05.48	

=== Final ===
The final was held on 26 June at 18:35.

Rank	Lane	Name	Nationality	Time	Notes
1st place, gold medalist(s)	4	Arina Openysheva	Russia	1:58.22	GR
2nd place, silver medalist(s)	5	Marrit Steenbergen	Netherlands	1:58.99	
3rd place, bronze medalist(s)	8	Leonie Kullmann	Germany	1:59.77	
4	1	Katrin Gottwald	Germany	2:00.64	
5	2	Anastasia Kirpichnikova	Russia	2:01.98	
6	3	Marta Cano	Spain	2:02.15	
7	6	Holly Hibbott	Great Britain	2:02.24	
8	7	Barbora Seemanová	Czech Republic	2:03.07	
