= Swimming at the 2015 European Games – Women's 400 metre freestyle =

Women's 400 metre freestyle at the 2015 European Games
- Venue: Aquatic Palace
- Dates: 24 June
- Competitors: 45 from 29 nations
- Winning time: 4:08.81

Medalists
gold medal	Arina Openysheva	Russia
silver medal	Leonie Kullmann	Germany
bronze medal	Anastasia Kirpichnikova	Russia

The women's 400 metre freestyle event at the 2015 European Games in Baku took place on 24 June at the Aquatic Palace.

== Results ==
=== Heats ===
The heats were started at 09:45.

Rank	Heat	Lane	Name	Nationality	Time	Notes
1	5	4	Arina Openysheva	Russia	4:14.95	Q, GR
2	4	3	Anastasia Kirpichnikova	Russia	4:15.68	Q
3	4	1	Giovanna La Cava	Italy	4:16.12	Q
4	4	4	Holly Hibbott	Great Britain	4:16.53	Q
5	5	6	Leonie Kullmann	Germany	4:18.40	Q
6	5	5	Léa Marchal	France	4:19.27	Q
7	4	5	Paula Ruiz	Spain	4:19.50	Q
8	4	8	Sveva Schiazzano	Italy	4:20.16	Q
9	4	9	Esther Huete	Spain	4:20.38	
10	5	3	Paulina Piechota	Poland	4:21.10	
11	5	1	Marina Castro	Spain	4:21.29	
12	3	3	Irina Krivonogova	Russia	4:21.64	
13	3	5	Laura van Engelen	Netherlands	4:21.89	
14	3	6	Lea Boy	Germany	4:21.91	
15	5	9	Anna-Marie Benešová	Czech Republic	4:22.93	
16	4	7	Madeleine Crompton	Great Britain	4:23.29	
17	3	4	Josephine Holm	Denmark	4:23.79	
18	5	0	Marta Cano	Spain	4:24.12	
19	3	1	Marte Løvberg	Norway	4:24.26	
20	5	8	Aino Otava	Finland	4:25.83	
21	5	2	Julia Mrozinski	Germany	4:26.14	
22	2	5	Matea Sumajstorčić	Croatia	4:26.74	
23	4	2	Valeriya Timchenko	Ukraine	4:26.88	
23	4	0	Mariana Petrova	Russia	4:26.88	
25	3	9	Julia Adamczyk	Poland	4:27.64	
26	2	3	Kristina Miletić	Croatia	4:27.79	
27	2	8	Elena Giovannini	San Marino	4:28.98	
28	5	7	Janka Juhász	Hungary	4:29.03	
29	3	8	Sunneva Friðriksdóttir	Iceland	4:29.31	
30	1	5	Hanna Eriksson	Sweden	4:29.47	
31	4	6	Anja Crevar	Serbia	4:30.14	
32	3	2	Signe Bro	Denmark	4:30.47	
33	2	4	Ana Rita Faria	Portugal	4:30.72	
34	3	0	Maria Cabral	Portugal	4:30.83	
35	2	6	Jill Benne	Switzerland	4:30.95	
36	2	1	Greta Gataveckaitė	Lithuania	4:31.69	
37	3	7	Esther Uhl	Austria	4:32.40	
38	1	4	Maja Uduč	Slovenia	4:33.93	
39	2	7	Zeynep Odabaşı	Turkey	4:34.91	
40	2	9	Helena Rosendahl Bach	Denmark	4:35.32	
41	2	2	Eydís Ósk Kolbeinsdóttir	Iceland	4:35.47	
42	2	0	Emilia Colti Dumitrescu	Romania	4:36.87	
43	1	3	Katie Baguley	Ireland	4:37.15	
44	1	2	Lamija Medošević	Bosnia and Herzegovina	4:43.73	
45	1	6	Diana Basho	Albania	5:00.36	

=== Final ===
The final was held at 17:34.

Rank	Lane	Name	Nationality	Time	Notes
1st place, gold medalist(s)	4	Arina Openysheva	Russia	4:08.81	GR
2nd place, silver medalist(s)	2	Leonie Kullmann	Germany	4:12.16	
3rd place, bronze medalist(s)	5	Anastasia Kirpichnikova	Russia	4:13.13	
4	6	Holly Hibbott	Great Britain	4:13.17	
5	3	Giovanna La Cava	Italy	4:17.99	
6	7	Léa Marchal	France	4:19.67	
7	8	Sveva Schiazzano	Italy	4:19.70	
8	1	Paula Ruiz	Spain	4:22.22	
