= Swimming at the 2015 European Games – Women's 100 metre freestyle =

Women's 100 metre freestyle at the 2015 European Games
- Venue: Aquatic Palace
- Dates: 23–24 June
- Competitors: 64 from 35 nations
- Winning time: 53.97

Medalists
gold medal	Marrit Steenbergen	Netherlands
silver medal	Arina Openysheva	Russia
bronze medal	Maria Kameneva	Russia

The women's 100 metre freestyle event at the 2015 European Games in Baku took place on 23 and 24 June at the Aquatic Palace.

== Results ==
=== Heats ===
The heats were started on 23 June at 09:50.

Rank	Heat	Lane	Name	Nationality	Time	Notes
1	6	4	Marrit Steenbergen	Netherlands	55.18	Q, GR
1	7	4	Arina Openysheva	Russia	55.18	Q, =GR
3	5	4	Maria Kameneva	Russia	55.94	Q
4	7	5	Katrin Gottwald	Germany	56.44	Q
5	6	5	Julie Kepp Jensen	Denmark	56.51	Q
6	6	6	Darcy Deakin	Great Britain	56.59	Q
7	6	8	Barbora Seemanová	Czech Republic	56.94	Q
8	6	3	Georgia Coates	Great Britain	56.96	Q
9	7	3	Leonie Kullmann	Germany	57.00	Q
10	5	1	Marte Løvberg	Norway	57.06	Q
11	7	7	Hannah Featherstone	Great Britain	57.11	
12	6	7	Madeleine Crompton	Great Britain	57.29	
13	7	8	Carmen San Nicolás	Spain	57.32	Q
14	6	2	Frederique Janssen	Netherlands	57.34	Q
15	5	6	Marta Cano	Spain	57.35	Q
16	5	7	Hana van Loock	Germany	57.40	
17	5	2	Lotte Goris	Belgium	57.58	Q
18	7	6	Roosa Mört	Finland	57.63	Q
19	5	5	Vasilissa Buinaia	Russia	57.74	
20	6	1	Lia Neubert	Germany	57.97	
21	4	8	Diana Jaruševičiūtė	Lithuania	57.99	Q
21	5	3	Olesia Cherniatina	Russia	57.99	
23	7	9	Emily Gantriis	Denmark	58.03	
24	4	7	Matea Sumajstorčić	Croatia	58.15	
25	4	3	Zeynep Odabaşı	Turkey	58.52	
26	5	9	Neža Klančar	Slovenia	58.53	
27	4	1	Kertu Ly Alnek	Estonia	58.61	
28	6	0	Cornelia Rott	Austria	58.64	
28	7	2	Reetta Kanervo	Finland	58.64	
30	4	4	Rachel Bethel	Ireland	58.72	
31	3	0	Sezin Eligül	Turkey	58.74	
32	4	9	Magdalena Roman	Poland	58.75	
32	5	8	Ada Niewiadomska	Poland	58.75	
34	5	0	Lucia Šimovičová	Slovakia	58.82	
35	6	9	Camilla Tinelli	Italy	58.84	
36	2	6	Jovana Terzić	Montenegro	58.87	
37	4	6	Josephine Holm	Denmark	58.93	
38	7	1	Eveliina Kallio	Finland	59.02	
39	3	4	Zoe Preisig	Switzerland	59.04	
40	2	3	Iseult Hayes	Ireland	59.14	
40	3	6	Diana Petkova	Bulgaria	59.14	
42	3	8	Ana Rita Faria	Portugal	59.18	
42	4	5	Lena Opatril	Austria	59.18	
44	7	0	Signe Bro	Denmark	59.20	
45	3	9	Bryndís Bolladóttir	Iceland	59.29	
46	4	0	Julia Bruneau	Finland	59.41	
47	4	2	Neža Kocijan	Slovenia	59.61	
48	3	3	Katarzyna Rogowska	Poland	59.73	
49	2	5	Zsófia Leitner	Hungary	59.80	
49	3	1	Sunneva Friðriksdóttir	Iceland	59.80	
51	2	7	Zuzana Pavlikovská	Slovakia	59.82	
52	2	4	Julia Klonowska	Poland	59.84	
53	3	7	Greta Pleikytė	Lithuania	59.99	
54	2	8	Beatrice Felici	San Marino	1:00.06	
55	1	6	Lamija Medošević	Bosnia and Herzegovina	1:00.19	
56	3	5	Hanna Eriksson	Sweden	1:00.21	
57	2	9	Almina Simla Ertan	Turkey	1:00.39	
58	2	1	Mona McSharry	Ireland	1:00.51	
59	2	0	Kalia Antoniou	Cyprus	1:00.57	
60	3	2	Safiya Akhapkina	Belarus	1:00.97	
61	1	4	Ana Cosmina	Moldova	1:01.34	
62	1	3	Lív Erlingsdóttir Eidesgaard	LEN ( Faroe Islands)	1:02.33	
63	2	2	Anna Manchenkova	Azerbaijan	1:03.15	
64	1	5	Ana-Maria Damjanovska	Macedonia	1:03.54	

=== Semifinals ===
The semifinals were started on 23 June at 18:29.

==== Semifinal 1 ====
Rank	Lane	Name	Nationality	Time	Notes
1	4	Arina Openysheva	Russia	55.26	Q
2	1	Lotte Goris	Belgium	56.38	Q
3	3	Darcy Deakin	Great Britain	56.61	q
4	5	Katrin Gottwald	Germany	57.00	
5	7	Frederique Janssen	Netherlands	57.06	
6	6	Georgia Coates	Great Britain	57.35	
7	2	Marte Løvberg	Norway	57.86	
8	8	Diana Jaruševičiūtė	Lithuania	57.94	

==== Semifinal 2 ====
Rank	Lane	Name	Nationality	Time	Notes
1	4	Marrit Steenbergen	Netherlands	53.97	Q, GR
2	5	Maria Kameneva	Russia	55.37	Q
3	6	Barbora Seemanová	Czech Republic	56.47	q
4	2	Leonie Kullmann	Germany	56.47	q
5	7	Carmen San Nicolás	Spain	56.89	q
6	3	Julie Kepp Jensen	Denmark	56.90	
7	1	Marta Cano	Spain	57.36	
8	8	Roosa Mört	Finland	57.53	

=== Final ===
The final was held on 24 June at 18:22.

Rank	Lane	Name	Nationality	Time	Notes
1st place, gold medalist(s)	4	Marrit Steenbergen	Netherlands	53.97	=GR
2nd place, silver medalist(s)	5	Arina Openysheva	Russia	54.45	
3rd place, bronze medalist(s)	3	Maria Kameneva	Russia	55.19	
4	2	Barbora Seemanová	Czech Republic	56.85	
5	1	Darcy Deakin	Great Britain	56.94	
6	6	Lotte Goris	Belgium	57.12	
7	8	Carmen San Nicolás	Spain	57.57	
8	7	Leonie Kullmann	Germany	57.64	
