= Swimming at the 2015 European Games – Women's 800 metre freestyle =

Women's 800 metre freestyle at the 2015 European Games
- Venue: Aquatic Palace
- Dates: 23 June
- Competitors: 25 from 19 nations
- Winning time: 8:39.02

Medalists
gold medal	Holly Hibbott	Great Britain
silver medal	Anastasiya Kirpichnikova	Russia
bronze medal	Marina Castro	Spain

The women's 800 metre freestyle event at the 2015 European Games took place on 23 June at the Aquatic Palace in Baku.

== Results ==
The heats were started at 12:14 and 19:12.

Rank	Heat	Lane	Name	Nationality	Time	Notes
1st place, gold medalist(s)	3	4	Holly Hibbott	Great Britain	8:39.02	GR
2nd place, silver medalist(s)	3	8	Anastasiya Kirpichnikova	Russia	8:39.73	
3rd place, bronze medalist(s)	3	2	Marina Castro	Spain	8:45.51	
4	3	6	Sveva Schiazzano	Italy	8:46.64	
5	3	5	Paulina Piechota	Poland	8:47.20	
6	3	1	Janka Juhász	Hungary	8:50.21	
7	3	3	Josephine Tesch	Germany	8:51.73	
8	2	5	Giovanna La Cava	Italy	8:51.88	
9	2	4	Léa Marchal	France	8:54.28	
10	2	2	Lea Boy	Germany	8:56.12	
11	2	3	Esther Huete	Spain	8:56.75	
12	3	7	Mariana Petrova	Russia	8:59.44	
13	2	8	Julia Adamczyk	Poland	9:05.52	
14	2	6	Valeriya Timchenko	Ukraine	9:07.82	
15	2	1	Anna-Marie Benešová	Czech Republic	9:10.36	
16	1	6	Sunneva Friðriksdóttir	Iceland	9:11.90	
17	2	7	Aino Otava	Finland	9:13.40	
18	2	0	Jill Benne	Switzerland	9:14.73	
19	1	3	Kristina Miletić	Croatia	9:14.76	
20	1	2	Emilia Colti Dumitrescu	Romania	9:15.63	
21	1	7	Greta Gataveckaitė	Lithuania	9:16.00	
22	2	9	Maja Uduč	Slovenia	9:21.36	
23	1	4	Ana Rita Faria	Portugal	9:22.19	
24	1	5	Esther Uhl	Austria	9:30.63	
25	1	1	Harpa Ingþórsdóttir	Iceland	9:30.65	
