= Canoe sprint at the 2015 European Games – Women's K-1 500 metres =

Women's K-1 500 metres at the 2015 European Games
- Venue: Kur Sport and Rowing Centre, Mingachevir
- Date: 14–16 June
- Competitors: 27 from 27 nations
- Winning time: 2:03.569

Medalists
gold medal	Danuta Kozák	Hungary
silver medal	Yvonne Schuring	Austria
bronze medal	Ewelina Wojnarowska	Poland

The women's K-1 500 metres canoe sprint competition at the 2015 European Games in Baku took place between 14 and 16 June at the Kur Sport and Rowing Centre in Mingachevir.

== Schedule ==
The schedule was as follows:

Date	Time	Round
Sunday 14 June 2015	13:00	Heats
Sunday 14 June 2015	15:30	Semifinals
Tuesday 16 June 2015	11:06	Finals

All times are Azerbaijan Summer Time (UTC+5)

== Results ==
=== Heats ===
Heat winners advanced directly to the A final. The next six fastest boats in each heat advanced to the semifinals.

==== Heat 1 ====
Rank	Kayaker	Country	Time	Notes
1	Ewelina Wojnarowska	Poland	1:50.851	QA, GB
2	Yvonne Schuring	Austria	1:52.018	QS
3	Špela Ponomarenko Janić	Slovenia	1:53.438	QS
4	Irene Burgo	Italy	1:53.674	QS
5	Svitlana Rymkevych	Ukraine	1:54.723	QS
6	Jennifer Egan	Ireland	1:55.468	QS
7	Lasma Liepa	Turkey	1:56.486	QS
8	Oona Vasko	Finland	1:56.503	
9	Vlada Kosytska	Georgia	2:08.336	

==== Heat 2 ====
Rank	Kayaker	Country	Time	Notes
1	Volha Khudzenka	Belarus	1:50.399	QA, GB
2	Inna Osypenko-Radomska	Azerbaijan	1:51.221	QS
3	Teresa Portela	Portugal	1:53.169	QS
4	Verena Hantl	Germany	1:53.788	QS
5	Kira Stepanova	Russia	1:53.855	QS
6	Eef Haaze	Netherlands	1:55.524	QS
7	Brigita Bakić	Croatia	2:02.021	QS
8	Madara Aldiņa	Latvia	2:02.771	
9	Sofia Pipitsouli	Greece	2:05.547	

==== Heat 3 ====
Rank	Kayaker	Country	Time	Notes
1	Danuta Kozák	Hungary	1:50.106	QA, GB
2	Rachel Cawthorn	Great Britain	1:53.226	QS
3	Nikolina Moldovan	Serbia	1:54.999	QS
4	Lize Broekx	Belgium	1:55.356	QS
5	Sarah Guyot	France	1:55.959	QS
6	Begoña Lazcano	Spain	1:57.949	QS
7	Berenike Faldum	Bulgaria	2:00.063	QS
8	Anelė Šakalytė	Lithuania	2:02.658	
9	Natalia Gulco	Moldova	2:04.484	

=== Semifinals ===
The fastest three boats in each semi advanced to the A final. The next four fastest boats in each semi, plus the fastest remaining boat advanced to the B final.

==== Semifinal 1 ====
Rank	Kayaker	Country	Time	Notes
1	Nikolina Moldovan	Serbia	1:47.856	QA, GB
2	Yvonne Schuring	Austria	1:48.178	QA
3	Teresa Portela	Portugal	1:48.896	QA
4	Begoña Lazcano	Spain	1:50.898	QB
5	Kira Stepanova	Russia	1:51.476	QB
6	Irene Burgo	Italy	1:51.804	QB
7	Jennifer Egan	Ireland	1:52.536	QB
8	Lize Broekx	Belgium	1:53.113	qB
9	Brigita Bakić	Croatia	2:00.024	

==== Semifinal 2 ====
Rank	Kayaker	Country	Time	Notes
1	Rachel Cawthorn	Great Britain	1:48.028	QA
2	Inna Osypenko-Radomska	Azerbaijan	1:48.132	QA
3	Špela Ponomarenko Janić	Slovenia	1:48.358	QA
4	Sarah Guyot	France	1:50.619	QB
5	Verena Hantl	Germany	1:52.283	QB
6	Eef Haaze	Netherlands	1:52.713	QB
7	Lasma Liepa	Turkey	1:56.007	QB
8	Svitlana Rymkevych	Ukraine	1:56.704	
9	Berenike Faldum	Bulgaria	1:58.320	

=== Finals ===
==== Final B ====
Competitors in this final raced for positions 10 to 18.

Rank	Kayaker	Country	Time
1	Verena Hantl	Germany	2:07.071
2	Kira Stepanova	Russia	2:07.601
3	Irene Burgo	Italy	2:08.509
4	Lize Broekx	Belgium	2:08.829
5	Eef Haaze	Netherlands	2:10.188
6	Jennifer Egan	Ireland	2:11.396
7	Begoña Lazcano	Spain	2:12.441
8	Lasma Liepa	Turkey	2:16.028
9	Sarah Guyot	France	2:19.764

==== Final A ====
Competitors in this final raced for positions 1 to 9, with medals going to the top three.

Rank	Kayaker	Country	Time
1st place, gold medalist(s)	Danuta Kozák	Hungary	2:03.569
2nd place, silver medalist(s)	Yvonne Schuring	Austria	2:04.708
3rd place, bronze medalist(s)	Ewelina Wojnarowska	Poland	2:05.389
4	Volha Khudzenka	Belarus	2:05.507
5	Inna Osypenko-Radomska	Azerbaijan	2:05.583
6	Špela Ponomarenko Janić	Slovenia	2:05.754
7	Nikolina Moldovan	Serbia	2:08.447
8	Rachel Cawthorn	Great Britain	2:08.483
9	Teresa Portela	Portugal	2:15.435
