= Swimming at the 2015 European Games – Women's 50 metre freestyle =

Women's 50 metre freestyle at the 2015 European Games
- Venue: Aquatic Palace
- Dates: 26 June
- Competitors: 58 from 31 nations
- Winning time: 25.23

Medalists
gold medal	Maria Kameneva	Russia
silver medal	Marrit Steenbergen	Netherlands
bronze medal	Julie Kepp Jensen	Denmark

The women's 50 metre freestyle event at the 2015 European Games in Baku took place on 26 June at the Aquatic Palace.

== Results ==
=== Heats ===
The heats were started at 09:30.

Rank	Heat	Lane	Name	Nationality	Time	Notes
1	6	5	Julie Kepp Jensen	Denmark	25.55	Q, GR
2	6	4	Maria Kameneva	Russia	25.64	Q
3	5	4	Marrit Steenbergen	Netherlands	25.86	Q
4	4	4	Vasilissa Buinaia	Russia	26.03	Q
5	6	3	Reetta Kanervo	Finland	26.22	Q
6	5	1	Diana Jaruševičiūtė	Lithuania	26.40	Q
7	5	5	Natalia Fryckowska	Poland	26.42	Q
8	5	7	Jana Zinnecker	Germany	26.47	Q
9	6	7	Marte Løvberg	Norway	26.52	Q
10	2	1	Almina Simla Ertan	Turkey	26.60	Q
10	6	6	Barbora Seemanová	Czech Republic	26.60	Q
12	5	8	Sini Koivu	Finland	26.64	Q
13	4	5	Frederique Janssen	Netherlands	26.67	Q
14	5	6	Josephine Tesch	Germany	26.72	Q
15	4	3	Ada Niewiadomska	Poland	26.73	Q
15	6	8	Diana Petkova	Bulgaria	26.73	Q
17	4	8	Marta Cano	Spain	26.76	
17	6	2	Jasmijn Boon	Netherlands	26.76	
19	3	0	Roosa Mort	Finland	26.77	
20	5	2	Darcy Deakin	Great Britain	26.78	
21	5	3	Katrin Gottwald	Germany	26.85	
22	4	6	Olesia Cherniatina	Russia	26.88	
23	5	9	Hana van Loock	Germany	26.90	
23	6	1	Emily Gantriis	Denmark	26.90	
25	6	9	Hannah Featherstone	Great Britain	26.93	
26	3	5	Pien Schravesande	Netherlands	27.04	
27	5	0	Conni Rott	Austria	27.10	
28	4	2	Caroline Hechenbichler	Austria	27.16	
29	4	0	Neža Kocijan	Slovenia	27.17	
30	3	8	Sezin Eligül	Turkey	27.21	
31	4	7	Kertu Ly Alnek	Estonia	27.24	
32	4	1	Danielle Hill	Ireland	27.25	
33	3	4	Dominika Geržová	Czech Republic	27.26	
33	6	0	Lucia Šimovičová	Slovakia	27.26	
35	4	9	Julia Bruneau	Finland	27.27	
36	3	1	Bryndís Bolladóttir	Iceland	27.39	
37	3	2	Beatrice Felici	San Marino	27.40	
38	1	5	Madeleine Crompton	Great Britain	27.41	
38	2	5	Greta Pleikytė	Lithuania	27.41	
40	2	4	Zsófia Leitner	Hungary	27.51	
40	2	6	Rachel Bethel	Ireland	27.51	
40	3	6	Kalia Antoniou	Cyprus	27.51	
43	2	7	Jovana Terzić	Montenegro	27.57	
43	2	9	Rebecca Pető	Switzerland	27.57	
45	1	2	Mona McSharry	Ireland	27.59	
46	3	3	Katarzyna Rogowska	Poland	27.67	
47	2	0	Iseult Hayes	Ireland	27.69	
48	1	4	Ana Cosmina	Moldova	27.80	
49	1	7	Lamija Medošević	Bosnia and Herzegovina	27.84	
50	3	7	Josephine Holm	Denmark	27.94	
51	2	3	Zoe Preisig	Switzerland	27.97	
52	2	2	Julia Klonowska	Poland	28.09	
53	1	6	Lív Erlingsdóttir Eidesgaard	LEN ( Faroe Islands)	28.12	
53	3	9	Safiya Akhapkina	Belarus	28.12	
55	1	3	Ana-Maria Damjanovska	Macedonia	28.57	
56	2	8	Anna Manchenkova	Azerbaijan	29.07	
57	1	1	Flaka Pruthi	Kosovo	29.99	
58	1	8	Melisa Zhdrella	Kosovo	30.38	

=== Semifinals ===
The semifinals were started at 17:30.

==== Semifinal 1 ====
Rank	Lane	Name	Nationality	Time	Notes
1	4	Maria Kameneva	Russia	25.44	Q, GR
2	5	Vasilissa Buinaia	Russia	25.86	Q
3	3	Diana Jaruševičiūtė	Lithuania	26.41	
4	6	Jana Zinnecker	Germany	26.47	
5	2	Almina Simla Ertan	Turkey	26.51	
6	7	Sini Koivu	Finland	26.53	
7	1	Josephine Tesch	Germany	26.67	
8	8	Diana Petkova	Bulgaria	26.78	

==== Semifinal 2 ====
Rank	Lane	Name	Nationality	Time	Notes
1	5	Marrit Steenbergen	Netherlands	25.56	Q
2	4	Julie Kepp Jensen	Denmark	25.58	Q
3	2	Marte Løvberg	Norway	26.08	q
4	3	Reetta Kanervo	Finland	26.16	q
5	6	Natalia Fryckowska	Poland	26.19	q
6	1	Frederique Janssen	Netherlands	26.29	q
7	7	Barbora Seemanová	Czech Republic	26.55	
8	8	Ada Niewiadomska	Poland	26.63	

=== Final ===
The final was held on at 19:29.

Rank	Lane	Name	Nationality	Time	Notes
1st place, gold medalist(s)	4	Maria Kameneva	Russia	25.23	GR
2nd place, silver medalist(s)	5	Marrit Steenbergen	Netherlands	25.27	
3rd place, bronze medalist(s)	3	Julie Kepp Jensen	Denmark	25.41	
4	1	Natalia Fryckowska	Poland	25.84	
5	2	Marte Løvberg	Norway	25.92	
6	7	Reetta Kanervo	Finland	26.11	
7	8	Frederique Janssen	Netherlands	26.56	
	6	Vasilissa Buinaia	Russia	DSQ	
