= Cycling at the 2015 European Games – Women's cross country =

The women's cross-country cycling event at the 2015 European Games in Baku took place at Mountain Bike Velopark on 13 June.

== Result ==
Rank	Rider	Nation	Time
1st place, gold medalist(s)	Jolanda Neff	Switzerland	1:31:05
2nd place, silver medalist(s)	Kathrin Stirnemann	Switzerland	1:33:08
3rd place, bronze medalist(s)	Maja Włoszczowska	Poland	1:33:13
4	Eva Lechner	Italy	1:35:08
5	Linda Indergand	Switzerland	1:35:16
6	Blaža Klemenčič	Slovenia	1:35:29
7	Yana Belomoyna	Ukraine	1:35:47
8	Jenny Rissveds	Sweden	1:36:22
9	Monika Żur	Poland	1:37:23
10	Tereza Huříková	Czech Republic	1:37:31
11	Margot Moschetti	France	1:38:24
12	Lisa Mitterbauer	Austria	1:39:07
13	Barbora Průdková	Czech Republic	1:39:56
14	Tina Perše	Slovenia	1:40:01
15	Paula Gorycka	Poland	1:41:11
16	Ekaterina Anoshina	Russia	1:42:33
17	Perrine Clauzel	France	1:43:02
18	Lisa Rabensteiner	Italy	1:44:45
19	Jovana Crnogorac	Serbia	LAP
20	Maaris Meier	Estonia	LAP
21	Andrea Kiršić	Croatia	LAP
22	Sonja Kallio	Finland	LAP
23	Joana Monteiro	Portugal	LAP
24	Esra Kürkçü	Turkey	LAP
25	Danai Stroumpouli	Greece	LAP
	Ulfet Nazarli	Azerbaijan	DNF
