= Poland at the 2015 European Games =

- IOC code: POL
- NOC: Polish Olympic Committee
- Website: www.olimpijski.pl

in Baku, Azerbaijan 12 – 28 June 2015
- Competitors: 213 in 23 sports
- Flag bearer: Dawid Konarski
- Medals Ranked 19th: Gold 2 Silver 8 Bronze 10 Total 20

European Games appearances (overview)
- 2015; 2019; 2023; 2027

Poland competed at the 2015 European Games, in Baku, Azerbaijan from 12 to 28 June 2015.

== Medalists ==
Medal	Name	Sport	Event	Date
Gold	Marta Walczykiewicz	Canoe sprint	K-1 200 m	16 June
Gold	Angelika Wątor	Fencing	Women's sabre	25 June
Silver	Katarzyna Krawczyk	Wrestling	Women's Freestyle 55 kg	15 June
Silver	Roksana Zasina	Wrestling	Women's Freestyle 53 kg	16 June
Silver	Karol Robak	Taekwondo	Men's 68 kg	17 June
Silver	Magomedmurad Gadzhiev	Wrestling	Men's Freestyle 70 kg	18 June
Silver	Katarzyna Niewiadoma	Cycling	Women's road race	20 June
Silver	Paweł Sendyk	Swimming	Men's 50 metre butterfly	23 June
Silver	Sandra Drabik	Boxing	Women's 51 kg	25 June
Silver	Katarzyna Skowrońska-Dolata; Agnieszka Bednarek-Kasza; Izabela Bełcik; Sylwia Pycia; Anna Werblińska; Joanna Wołosz; Katarzyna Zaroślińska; Maja Tokarska; Anna Miros; Agnieszka Kąkolewska; Agata Sawicka; Agata Dujarczyk; Natalia Kurnikowska; Daria Paszek	Volleyball	Women's tournament	27 June
Bronze	Maja Włoszczowska	Cycling	Women's cross country	13 June
Bronze	Ewelina Wojnarowska; Beata Mikołajczyk; Karolina Naja; Edyta Dzieniszewska-Kierkla	Canoe sprint	K-4 500 m	15 June
Bronze	Iwona Matkowska	Wrestling	Women's Freestyle 48 kg	15 June
Bronze	Ewelina Wojnarowska	Canoe sprint	K-1 500 m	16 June
Bronze	Radosław Marcinkiewicz	Wrestling	Men's Freestyle 86 kg	18 June
Bronze	Lidia Fidura	Boxing	Women's 75 kg	24 June
Bronze	Aneta Rygielska	Boxing	Women's 64 kg	25 June
Bronze	Mateusz Polski	Boxing	Men's 60 kg	26 June
Bronze	Karol Zbutowicz	Swimming	Men's 400 m individual medley	27 June
Bronze	Jakub Skierka; Jacek Arentewicz; Michał Chudy; Paweł Sendyk	Swimming	Men's 4 × 100 m medley relay	27 June

== Archery ==
Men's

Athlete	Event	Ranking round		Round of 64	Round of 32	Round of 16	Quarterfinals	Semifinals	Final / BM	
Athlete	Event	Score	Seed	Opposition Score	Opposition Score	Opposition Score	Opposition Score	Opposition Score	Opposition Score	Rank
Sławomir Napłoszek	Men's individual	664	17	El Helali (CYP) (48); W 6–5	Tekoniemi (FIN) (16); W 6–2	Nespoli (ITA) (1); W 6–4	Daniel (FRA) (8); W 6–0	Alvarino Garcia (ESP) (12); L 3–7	Prilepov (BLR) (7); L 3–7	4
Marek Szafran	Men's individual	646	42	Liahusheu (BLR) (23); W 6–4	Pkhakadze (GEO) (10); L 2–6	Did not advance				17
Rafał Wojtkowiak	Men's individual	651	33	Olaru (MDA) (32); W 6–4	Nespoli (ITA) (1); L 0–6	Did not advance				17
Sławomir Napłoszek; Marek Szafran; Rafał Wojtkowiak	Team	1960	9	—N/a		Russia (RUS) (8); L 3–5	Did not advance			9

Women's

Athlete	Event	Ranking round		Round of 64	Round of 32	Round of 16	Quarterfinals	Semifinals	Final / BM	
Athlete	Event	Score	Seed	Opposition Score	Opposition Score	Opposition Score	Opposition Score	Opposition Score	Opposition Score	Rank
Natalia Leśniak	Women's individual	619	42	Timofeyeva (BLR) (23); L 2–6	Did not advance					33
Wioleta Myszor	Women's individual	636	18	Deden (NED) (47); L 4–6	Did not advance					33
Adriana Żurańska	Women's individual	628	32	Schobinger (SUI) (33); W 6–4	Unruh (GER) (1); L 1–7	Did not advance				17
Natalia Leśniak; Wioleta Myszor; Adriana Żurańska	Team	1883	11	—N/a		Denmark (DEN) (6); L 4–5	Did not advance			9

Mixed

Athlete	Event	Ranking round		Round of 64	Round of 32	Round of 16	Quarterfinals	Semifinals	Final / BM	
Athlete	Event	Score	Seed	Opposition Score	Opposition Score	Opposition Score	Opposition Score	Opposition Score	Opposition Score	Rank
Wioleta Myszor; Sławomir Napłoszek	Mixed team	1300	12	—N/a		Russia (RUS) (5); L 0–6	Did not advance			9

== Badminton ==
Based on the BWF European rankings as at 26 March 2015, Poland has secured the following quotas for the Games.

Athlete	Event	Group stage				Elimination	Quarterfinal	Semifinal	Final / BM	
Athlete	Event	Opposition Score	Opposition Score	Opposition Score	Rank	Opposition Score	Opposition Score	Opposition Score	Opposition Score	Rank
Michał Rogalski	Men's singles	L Wraber (AUT); W 2–0 21–16; 21–16	V Kushnir (BLR); W 2–0 21–8; 21–9	R Krauklis (LAT); W 2–0 21–16; 21–9	1 Q	Y Tan (BEL); L 0–2 11–21; 16–21	Did not advance			
Weronika Grudzina	Women's singles	L Zetchiri (BUL); L 0–2 9–21; 20–22	L Sarosi (HUN); L 1–2 15–21; 21–15; 11–21	M Ulitina (UKR); L 0–2 18–21; 18–21	4	Did not advance				
Miłosz Bochat; Paweł Pietryja	Men's doubles	M Dierickx / F Golinski (BEL); L 0–2 16–21; 20–22	G Natarov / A Pochtarev (UKR); W 2–0 21–15; 21–18	L Mihaylov / M Mihaylov (BUL); W 2–0 21–12; 21–10	2 Q	—N/a	R Beck / A Heinz (GER); L 1–2 18–21; 21–13; 12–21	Did not advance		
Aneta Wojtowska; Paweł Pietryja	Mixed doubles	V Durkin / N Vislova (RUS); L 0–2 16–21; 11–21	C Burkart / O Schaller (SUI); W 2–0 21–13; 21–10	S Annys / F Oleffe (BEL); W 2–0 21–117; 21–10	2 Q	—N/a	C Magee / S Magee (IRL); L 0–2 18–21; 12–21	Did not advance		

== Boxing ==
Men

Athlete	Event	Round of 32	Round of 16	Quarterfinals	Semifinals	Final	
Athlete	Event	Opposition Result	Opposition Result	Opposition Result	Opposition Result	Opposition Result	Rank
Maciej Jóźwik	52 kg	Csoka (HUN); L 0–3	Did not advance				
Sylwester Kozłowski	56 kg	Ivanov (BUL); L 1–2	Did not advance				
Mateusz Polski	60 kg	BYE	Ivaniuc (MDA); W 3–0	Safaryants (BLR); W 2–1	Oumiha (FRA); L 0–3	Did not advance	3rd place, bronze medalist(s)
Kazimierz Łęgowski	64 kg	Dadashev (RUS); L 0–3	Did not advance				
Mateusz Kostecki	69 kg	Samofalov (UKR); L 0–3	Did not advance				
Kamil Gardzielik	75 kg	BYE	Pivorun (LTU); W 3–0	Harcsa (HUN); L 0–3	Did not advance		
Jordan Kuliński	81 kg	Nikol Arutyunov (ARM); W 3–0	Mammadov (UKR); L 0–3	Did not advance			

Women

Athlete	Event	Round of 32	Round of 16	Quarterfinals	Semifinals	Final	
Athlete	Event	Opposition Result	Opposition Result	Opposition Result	Opposition Result	Opposition Result	Rank
Sandra Drabik	51 kg	BYE	Aghayeva (AZE); W 3–0	Burym (BLR); W 3–0	Sagatayeva (RUS); W 3–0	Adams (GBR); L 0–2	2nd place, silver medalist(s)
Ewelina Wicherska	54 kg	BYE		Davide (ITA); L 0–3	Did not advance		
Aneta Rygielska	64 kg	BYE	Sitar (ROU); W 3–0	Kistler (SUI); W 3–0	Alberti (ITA); L 0–3	Did not advance	3rd place, bronze medalist(s)
Lidia Figura	75 kg	BYE		Iakushina (RUS); W 2–1	Laurell (SWE); L 1–2	Did not advance	3rd place, bronze medalist(s)

(all the men's medalists will qualify to participate in the World Championships 2015)

== Canoe sprint ==
Men

Athlete	Event	Heats		Semifinals		Finals	
Athlete	Event	Time	Rank	Time	Rank	Time	Rank
Tomasz Kaczor	C1 200m	41.568	4 Q	41.266	7 FB	42.962	16
Tomasz Kaczor	C1 1000m	4:00.357	2 FA	BYE		3:54.908	4
Denis Ambroziak	K1 200m	35.569	4 Q	35.143	4 FB	36.526	10
Martin Brzeziński	K1-1000m	3:42.461	4 Q	3:28.718	6 FB	3:37.345	14
Mateusz Kamiński; Michał Kudła	C2-1000m	3:38.242	1 FA	BYE		3:36.815	7
Paweł Kaczmarek; Dawid Putto	K2-200m	32.313	5 Q	31.918	5	Did not advance	
Rafał Maroń; Paweł Florczak; Paweł Szandrach; Maciej Kujawski	K4-1000m	2:52.420	1 FA	BYE		3:11.987	8

Women

Athlete	Event	Heats		Semifinals		Finals	
Athlete	Event	Time	Rank	Time	Rank	Time	Rank
Marta Walczykiewicz	K1 200m	40.427	1 FA	BYE		40.795	1st place, gold medalist(s)
Ewelina Wojnarowska	K1 500m	1:50.851	1 FA	BYE		2:05.389	3rd place, bronze medalist(s)
Beata Mikołajczyk; Karolina Naja	K2 200m	37.696	2 FA	BYE		38.410	5
Beata Mikołajczyk; Karolina Naja	K2 500m	1:39.609	2 FA	BYE		1:52.536	6
Marta Walczykiewicz; Beata Mikołajczyk; Karolina Naja; Edyta Dzieniszewska	K4 500m	1:34.463	3 FA	BYE		1:33.979	3rd place, bronze medalist(s)

Qualification Legend: FA = Qualify to final (medal); FB = Qualify to final B (non-medal)

== Cycling ==
=== Mountain biking ===
Athlete	Event	Time	Rank
Marek Konwa	Men's cross-country	1:47:36	12
Paula Gorycka	Women's cross-country	1:41:11	15
Maja Włoszczowska	Women's cross-country	1:33:13	3rd place, bronze medalist(s)
Monika Żur	Women's cross-country	1:37:23	9

=== Road ===
Men's

Athlete	Event	Time	Rank
Kamil Gradek	Men's time trial	1:02:39.41	10
Kamil Gradek	Men's road race	DNF	
Mateusz Taciak	Men's time trial	1:03:07.28	14
Mateusz Taciak	Men's road race	DNF	
Paweł Bernaś	Men's road race	DNF	
Bartłomiej Matysiak	Men's road race	5:33:43	41
Maciej Paterski	Men's road race	5:28:26	18
Michał Podlaski	Men's road race	5:33:43	35

Men's

Athlete	Event	Time	Rank
Eugenia Bujak	Women's time trial	34:38.82	9
Eugenia Bujak	Women's road race	3:25:53	9
Anna Plichta	Women's time trial	36:00.51	20
Anna Plichta	Women's road race	3:25:57	30
Monika Brzeźna	Women's road race	3:25:53	13
Paulina Guz	Women's road race	DNF	
Katarzyna Niewiadoma	Women's road race	3:20:36	2nd place, silver medalist(s)

== Diving ==
Men

Athlete	Event	Preliminaries		Final	
Athlete	Event	Points	Rank	Points	Rank
Krystian Sawicki	10m platform	343.50	18	Did not advance	

Women

Athlete	Event	Preliminaries		Final	
Athlete	Event	Points	Rank	Points	Rank
Dominika Bąk	1 m springboard	304.20	24	Did not advance	
Dominika Bąk	3 m springboard	351.10	15	Did not advance	
Dominika Mirowska	10m platform	297.60	16	Did not advance	
Kaja Skrzek	1 m springboard	366.20	8 Q	374.75	10
Kaja Skrzek	3 m springboard	382.80	8 Q	403.35	7
Kaja Skrzek; Dominika Bąk	3 m synchronized springboard	—N/a		237.69	5

== Fencing ==
- Men's individual épée – Radosław Zawrotniak
- Men's team foil – Leszek Rajski, Paweł Kawiecki, Michał Janda, Jakub Surwiłło
- Men's individual foil – Leszek Rajski, Paweł Kawiecki, Michał Janda, Jakub Surwiłło
- Men's individual sabre – Adam Skrodzki
- Women's individual épée – Ewa Nelip
- Women's team foil – Anna Szymczak, Julia Walczyk, Julia Chrzanowska, Natalia Gołębiowska
- Women's individual foil – Anna Szymczak, Julia Walczyk, Julia Chrzanowska, Natalia Gołębiowska
- Women's team sabre – Magdalena Pasternak, Angelika Wątor, Martyna Wątora, Karolina Kaleta
- Women's individual sabre – Magdalena Pasternak, Angelika Wątor, Martyna Wątora, Karolina Kaleta

== Gymnastics ==
=== Acrobatic ===
Team

Athlete	Event	Qualification				Final			
Athlete	Event	Discipline		Total	Rank	Discipline		Total	Rank
Athlete	Event	B	D	Total	Rank	B	D	Total	Rank
Patrycja Kloc	Women's group all-around					Did not advance			
Izabela Matias	Women's group all-around					Did not advance			
Alicja Sokołowska	Women's group all-around					Did not advance			
Total	Women's group all-around			75.960	11	Did not advance			
Angelika Kowaleska	Mixed pair all-around					Did not advance			
Maciej Zabierowski	Mixed pair all-around					Did not advance			
Total	Mixed pair all-around			76.510	7	Did not advance			

=== Artistic ===
Men

Athlete	Event	Qualification								Final							
Athlete	Event	Apparatus						Total	Rank	Apparatus						Total	Rank
Athlete	Event	F	PH	R	V	PB	HB	Total	Rank	F	PH	R	V	PB	HB	Total	Rank
Łukasz Borkowski	All-around	12.733	12.466	13.200	13.833	11.933	13.300	77.465	51	Did not advance							
Maksim Kowalenko	All-around	12.233	12.100	12.400	13.266	11.500	12.833	74.332	59	Did not advance							
Roman Kulesza	All-around	14.266	8.600	12.866	—N/a												

Women

Athlete	Event	Qualification						Final					
Athlete	Event	Apparatus				Total	Rank	Apparatus				Total	Rank
Athlete	Event	F	V	UB	BB	Total	Rank	F	V	UB	B	Total	Rank
Katarzyna Jurkowska	All-around	13.366	13.666	11.900	13.033	51.965	23	Did not advance					
Gabriela Janik	All-around	12.166	14.400 Q	13.233	12.566	52.365	20 Q	13.833	13.233	12.566	11.900	51.532	12
Paula Plichta	All-around	—N/a	11.533	—N/a									

Individual finals

Athlete	Event	Apparatus				Total	Rank
Athlete	Event	F	V	UB	BB	Total	Rank
Gabriela Janik	Vault	—N/a	13.966	—N/a		13.966	4

=== Trampoline ===
Athlete	Event	Qualification		Final	
Athlete	Event	Score	Rank	Score	Rank
Bartłomiej Hes	Men's	102.380	12	Did not advance	
Łukasz Tomaszewski	Men's	86.630	22	Did not advance	
Bartłomiej Hes; Łukasz Tomaszewski	Men's synchronized	85.700	4 Q	10.600	6

== Judo ==
- Men's 60 kg – Łukasz Kiełbasiński
- Men's 66 kg – Aleksander Beta
- Men's 73 kg – Damian Szwarnowiecki
- Men's 81 kg – Łukasz Błach, Jakub Kubieniec
- Men's 90 kg – Patryk Ciechomski
- Men's 100 kg – Jakub Wójcik
- Men's +100 kg – Maciej Sarnacki
- Women's 48 kg – Ewa Konieczny
- Women's 52 kg – Agata Perenc
- Women's 57 kg – Arleta Podolak
- Women's 63 kg – Agata Ozdoba
- Women's 70 kg – Katarzyna Kłys
- Women's 78 kg – Daria Pogorzelec
- Women's +78 kg – Katarzyna Furmanek

== Karate ==
=== Elimination round ===
==== Group A ====
Athlete	Pld	W	D	L	Points		
Athlete	Pld	W	D	L	GF	GA	Diff
Alvin Karaqi (KOS)	3	3	0	0	10	2	+8
Uğur Aktaş (TUR)	3	2	0	1	21	6	+15
Nello Maestri (ITA)	3	0	1	2	4	14	−10
Kamil Warda (POL)	3	0	1	2	2	15	−13

	Score	
Nello Maestri (ITA)	2–0	Kamil Warda (POL)
Uğur Aktaş (TUR)	9–1	Kamil Warda (POL)
Kamil Warda (POL)	1–4	Alvin Karaqi (KOS)

== Sambo ==
Athlete	Event	1/8 final	Quarterfinal	Semifinal	Repechage 1	Repechage 2	Final/BM	Rank
Sebastian Cieślik	74 kg	Papou (BLR); L 0–4	—N/a		Damian (ROU); L 1–3	Did not advance		

== Shooting ==
Men's

Athlete	Event	Qualification		Final	
Athlete	Event	Score	Rank	Score	Rank
Piotr Kowalczyk	Men's trap	119	12	Did not advance	
Jakub Trzebiński	Men's trap	119	13	Did not advance	
Dawid Migała	Men's 50 metre rifle prone	609.7	30	Did not advance	
Wojciech Knapik	Men's 50 metre pistol	546	18	Did not advance	
Wojciech Knapik	Men's 10 metre air pistol	571	23	Did not advance	
Kamil Gersten	Men's 50 metre pistol	543	20	Did not advance	
Konrad Białek	Men's 25 metre rapid fire pistol	567	16	Did not advance	
Piotr Daniluk	Men's 10 metre air pistol	580	7 Q	95.9	7
Piotr Daniluk	Men's 25 metre rapid fire pistol	561	19	Did not advance	

Women's

Athlete	Event	Qualification		Final	
Athlete	Event	Score	Rank	Score	Rank
Agnieszka Nagay	Women's 10 metre air rifle	412.2	21	Did not advance	
Agnieszka Nagay	Women's 50 metre rifle three positions	576	19	Did not advance	
Paula Wrońska	Women's 10 metre air rifle	405.5	36	Did not advance	
Paula Wrońska	Women's 50 metre rifle three positions	577	14	Did not advance	
Klaudia Breś	Women's 25 metre pistol	565	26	Did not advance	
Klaudia Breś	Women's 10 metre air pistol	383	10	Did not advance	
Aleksandra Jarmolińska	Women's skeet	71	7	Did not advance	

== Swimming ==
Men's:

Athlete	Event	Heat		Semifinal		Final	
Athlete	Event	Time	Rank	Time	Rank	Time	Rank
Patryk Adamczyk	200 m butterfly	1:59.88	7 q	2:00.12	5 q	1:59.88	4
Patryk Adamczyk	400 m medley	4:31.88	25	Did not advance			
Jacek Arentewicz	50 m backstroke	30.98	37	Did not advance			
Jacek Arentewicz	100 m backstroke	1:05.34	19	Did not advance			
Jacek Arentewicz	200 m backstroke	2:18.59	8 Q	2:17.47	11	Did not advance	
Mateusz Arndt	50 freestyle	26.42	7 q	26.19	7 q	25.84	4
Mateusz Arndt	50 m butterfly	28.41	24	Did not advance			
Michał Brzuś	50 m backstroke	30.24	18	Did not advance			
Michał Brzuś	200 m backstroke	2:19.99	17	Did not advance			
Michał Brzuś	200 m medley	2:24.88	23	Did not advance			
Damian Chrzanowski	100 m freestyle	59.84	52	Did not advance			
Damian Chrzanowski	200 m freestyle	2:10.51	48	Did not advance			
Michał Chudy	50 m freestyle	26.73	15 q	26.63	14	Did not advance	
Michał Chudy	100 m freestyle	58.75	32	Did not advance			
Juliusz Gosieniecki	400 m freestyle	4:21.10	10	Did not advance			
Juliusz Gosieniecki	800 m freestyle	—N/a				8:47.20	5
Juliusz Gosieniecki	1500 m freestyle	—N/a				17:00.47	5
Filip Hodur	50 m freestyle	27.67	46	Did not advance			
Filip Hodur	100 m freestyle	59.73	48	Did not advance			
Wiktor Jaszczak	100 m freestyle	58.75	32	Did not advance			
Wiktor Jaszczak	200 m freestyle	2:08.60	40	Did not advance			
Jakub Książek	400 m freestyle	4:27.64	25	Did not advance			
Jakub Książek	800 m freestyle	—N/a				9:05.52	13
Jakub Książek	1500 m freestyle	—N/a				17:22.63	9
Jakub Książek	200 m medley	2:23.58	21	Did not advance			
Dawid Murzyn	50 m backstroke	30.98	37	Did not advance			
Dawid Murzyn	100 m backstroke	1:05.34	19	Did not advance			
Dawid Murzyn	200 m backstroke	2:18.59	8 Q	2:17.47	11	Did not advance	
Dawid Pietrzak	400 m medley	4:43.86	43	Did not advance			
Dawid Pietrzak	50 m butterfly	28.41	24	Did not advance			
Paweł Sendyk	50 m backstroke	30.24	18	Did not advance			
Paweł Sendyk	200 m backstroke	2:19.99	17	Did not advance			
Paweł Sendyk	200 m medley	2:24.88	23	Did not advance			
Jakub Skierka	100 m freestyle	59.84	52	Did not advance			
Jakub Skierka	200 m freestyle	2:10.51	48	Did not advance			
Adam Staniszewski	50 m freestyle	26.73	15 q	26.63	14	Did not advance	
Adam Staniszewski	100 m freestyle	58.75	32	Did not advance			
Wojciech Ulatowski	200 m medley	2:10.33	36	Did not advance			
Wojciech Ulatowski	400 m medley	4:33.57	28	Did not advance			
Karol Zbutowicz	200 m medley	2:04.42	10 q	2:03.95	10	Did not advance	
Karol Zbutowicz	400 m medley	4:24.72	3 q	—N/a		4:22.22	3rd place, bronze medalist(s)
Mateusz Żurawicz	100 m butterfly	2:03.74	17	Did not advance			
Mateusz Żurawicz	200 m butterfly	56.58	38	Did not advance			
Michał Brzuś; Juliusz Gościeniecki; Mateusz Arndt; Michał Chudy	4 × 100 m freestyle relay	3:25.64	7 Q	—N/a		3:25.64	6
Karol Zbutowicz; Juliusz Gościeniecki; Adam Staniszewski; Mateusz Arndt	4 × 200 m freestyle relay	7:35.39	9	Did not advance			
Jakub Skierka; Jacek Arentewicz; Michał Chudy; Paweł Sendyk	4 × 100 m medley relay	3:45.25	3 Q	—N/a		3:39.31	3rd place, bronze medalist(s)

Women

Athlete	Event	Heat		Semifinal		Final	
Athlete	Event	Time	Rank	Time	Rank	Time	Rank
Julia Adamczyk	400 m freestyle	4:27.64	25	Did not advance			
Julia Adamczyk	800 m freestyle	—N/a				9:05.52	13
Julia Adamczyk	1500 m freestyle	—N/a				17:22.63	9
Julia Adamczyk	200 m medley	2:23.58	21	Did not advance			
Gabriela Bernat	50 m backstroke	30.98	37	Did not advance			
Gabriela Bernat	100 m backstroke	1:05.34	19	Did not advance			
Gabriela Bernat	200 m backstroke	2:18.59	8 Q	2:17.47	11	Did not advance	
Natalia Fryckowska	50 freestyle	26.42	7 q	26.19	7 q	25.84	4
Natalia Fryckowska	50 m butterfly	28.41	24	Did not advance			
Julia Gus	50 m backstroke	30.24	18	Did not advance			
Julia Gus	200 m backstroke	2:19.99	17	Did not advance			
Julia Gus	200 m medley	2:24.88	23	Did not advance			
Julia Klonowska	100 m freestyle	59.84	52	Did not advance			
Julia Klonowska	200 m freestyle	2:10.51	48	Did not advance			
Adrianna Niewiadomska	50 m freestyle	26.73	15 q	26.63	14	Did not advance	
Adrianna Niewiadomska	100 m freestyle	58.75	32	Did not advance			
Paulina Piechota	400 m freestyle	4:21.10	10	Did not advance			
Paulina Piechota	800 m freestyle	—N/a				8:47.20	5
Paulina Piechota	1500 m freestyle	—N/a				17:00.47	5
Katarzyna Rogowska	50 m freestyle	27.67	46	Did not advance			
Katarzyna Rogowska	100 m freestyle	59.73	48	Did not advance			
Magdalena Roman	100 m freestyle	58.75	32	Did not advance			
Magdalena Roman	200 m freestyle	2:08.60	40	Did not advance			
Natalia Fryckowska; Adrianna Niewiadomska; Magdalena Roman; Julia Klonowska	4 × 100 m freestyle relay	3:53.99	6 Q	—N/a		3:53.50	7

Mixed

Athlete	Event	Heat		Semifinal		Final	
Athlete	Event	Time	Rank	Time	Rank	Time	Rank
Michał Brzuś; Adrianna Niewiadomska; Magdalena Roman; Michał Chudy	4 × 100 m freestyle relay	3:39.53	6 Q	—N/a		DSQ	
Jacek Arentewicz; Gabriela Bernat; Magdalena Roman; Michał Chudy	4 × 100 m medley relay	4:02.55	5 Q	—N/a		DSQ	

== Synchronized swimming ==
Athlete	Event	Qualification		Final		
Athlete	Event	Points	Rank	Points	Total	Rank
Swietłana Szczepańska	Solo	133.6576	19	Did not advance		
Swietłana Szczepańska; Wiktoria Grabowska	Duet	130.9250	19	Did not advance		

== Table tennis ==
Athlete	Event	Round 1	Round 2	Round 3	Quarterfinals	Semifinals	Final / BM	
Athlete	Event	Opposition Result	Opposition Result	Opposition Result	Opposition Result	Opposition Result	Opposition Result	Rank
Wang Zengyi	Men's singles	Jafarov (AZE); W 4–0	Mattenet (FRA); L 3–4	Did not advance				
Daniel Górak	Men's singles	Olah (FIN); W 4–2	Fegerl (AUT); L 3–4	Did not advance				
Daniel Górak; Wang Zengyi; Jakub Dyjas	Men's team	—N/a		Azerbaijan (AZE); W 3–0	Portugal (POR); L 0–3	Did not advance		
Katarzyna Grzybowska	Women's singles	Feher (SRB); L 2–4	Did not advance					
Li Qian	Women's singles	Bye	Rakovac (CRO); W 4–0	Samara (ROU); W 4–3	Hu (TUR); L 3–4	Did not advance		
Katarzyna Grzybowska; Li Qian; Natalia Partyka	Women's team	—N/a		Luxembourg (LUX); W 3–1	Netherlands (NED); L 2–3	Did not advance		

== Taekwondo ==
Men's

Athlete	Event	Round of 16	Quarterfinals	Semifinals	Repechage	Bronze medal	Final	
Athlete	Event	Opposition Result	Opposition Result	Opposition Result	Opposition Result	Opposition Result	Opposition Result	Rank
Karol Robak	68 kg	Tazegul (TUR); W 21–9	Silva (POR); W 10–2	Arventii (MDA); W 13–1	BYE		Taghizade (AZE); L 9–10	2nd place, silver medalist(s)
Piotr Paziński	80 kg	Maizeroi (FRA); L 3–4	Did not advance					
Piotr Hatowski	+80 kg	Trajković (SLO); L 8–14	Did not advance					

Women's

Athlete	Event	Round of 16	Quarterfinals	Semifinals	Repechage	Bronze medal	Final	
Athlete	Event	Opposition Result	Opposition Result	Opposition Result	Opposition Result	Opposition Result	Opposition Result	Rank
Aleksandra Krzemieniecka	67 kg	Sumic (CRO); W 3–1	Baryshnikova (RUS); L 3–11	Did not advance	Tetereviatnykova (UKR); L 2–4	Did not advance		
Aleksandra Kowalczuk	+67 kg	Simon Alamo (ESP); L 4–5	Did not advance					

== Triathlon ==
Athlete	Event	Swim (1.5 km)	Trans 1	Bike (40 km)	Trans 2	Run (10 km)	Total Time	Rank
Mateusz Rak	Men's	19:27	0:48	57:42	1:52	35:01	1:53:24	27
Miłosz Sowiński	Men's	20:22	1:43	1:00:15	5:19	35:46	1:57:36	41
Maria Cześnik	Women's	21:52	0:57	1:05:05	0:32	36:07	2:04:33	10
Agnieszka Jerzyk	Women's	22:02	0:49	1:05:01	0:26	36:09	2:04:27	9
Paulina Kotfica	Women's	21:33	0:51	1:05:34	0:31	37:19	2:05:48	18

== Volleyball ==
=== Beach ===
Athlete	Event	Preliminary round	Standing	Elimination round	Round of 16	Quarterfinals	Semifinals	Final / BM
Athlete	Event	Opposition Score	Standing	Opposition Score	Opposition Score	Opposition Score	Opposition Score	Rank
Maciej Kosiak; Maciej Rudoł	Men's	Pool B Plotnytyskyi – Denin (UKR); W 2 – 0 (21–12, 21–12); Strasser – Kissling (SUI); L 0 – 2 (18–21, 15–21) Tomas Cuadro – Menendez Ortego (ESP); W 2 – 1 (18–21, 21–15, 15–13)	2 Q	Eglseer – Mullner (AUT); W 2 – 1 (21–17, 18–21, 19–17)	Winter – Petutsching (AUT); L 0 – 2 (17–21, 19–21)	Did not advance		
Jagoda Gruszczyńska; Karolina Baran	Women's	Pool G Longuet – Adelin (FRA); L 0 – 2 (19–21, 18–21); Makhno – Makhno (UKR); W 2 – 1 (21–16, 17–21, 15–13); Syrtceva – Prokopeva (RUS); L 0 – 2 (19–21, 17–21)	3 Q	Gioria – Momoli (ITA); W 2 – 0 (21–19, 21–17)	Dumbauskaite – Povilaityte (LTU); L 1 – 2 (16–21, 21–15, 15–17)	Did not advance		
Dorota Strąg; Katarzyna Kociołek	Women's	Pool H Karimova – Ferreira (AZE); L 0 – 2 (18–21, 18–21); Rehackova – Galova (CZE); W 2 – 0 (21–15, 21–17); Udovenko – Sulima (UKR); L 1 – 2 (18–21, 21–19, 14–16)	4	Did not advance				

=== Indoor ===
==== Men ====
Dawid Konarski, Grzegorz Kosok, Paweł Woicki, Damian Wojtaszek, Wojciech Ferens, Jan Nowakowski, Michał Kędzierski, Bartłomiej Bołądź, Artur Szalpuk, Adam Kowalski, Adrian Buchowski, Bartłomiej Grzechnik, Dawid Dryja, Aleksander Śliwka, Coach:Andrzej Kowal

===== Pool A =====
Pos	Team	Pld	W	L	Pts	SW	SL	SR	SPW	SPL	SPR	Qualification
1	Poland	5	5	0	12	15	6	2.500	464	401	1.157	Quarterfinals
2	France	5	4	1	12	14	5	2.800	431	381	1.131	Quarterfinals
3	Turkey	5	3	2	9	11	9	1.222	449	414	1.085	Quarterfinals
4	Serbia	5	2	3	8	11	9	1.222	430	419	1.026	Quarterfinals
5	Finland	5	1	4	2	3	14	0.214	334	403	0.829	
6	Azerbaijan	5	0	5	2	4	15	0.267	356	446	0.798	

Date	Time		Score		Set 1	Set 2	Set 3	Set 4	Set 5	Total	Report
14 Jun	22:00	Poland	3–2	France	25–27	25–20	25–20	10–25	15–10	100–102	Report
16 Jun	14:30	Turkey	2–3	Poland	20–25	19–25	30–28	25–22	13–15	107–115	Report
18 Jun	22:00	Serbia	2–3	Poland	25–13	25–21	15–25	23–25	9–15	97–99	Report
20 Jun	20:00	Poland	3–0	Azerbaijan	25–14	25–13	25–17			75–44	Report
22 Jun	09:00	Poland	3–0	Finland	25–21	25–20	25–10			75–51	Report

===== Quarterfinals =====
Date	Time		Score		Set 1	Set 2	Set 3	Set 4	Set 5	Total	Report
24 Jun	13:00	Poland	3–0	Slovakia	25–16	25–23	25–19			75–58	Report

===== Semifinals =====
Date	Time		Score		Set 1	Set 2	Set 3	Set 4	Set 5	Total	Report
26 Jun	17:00	Poland	2–3	Bulgaria	14–25	25–19	22–25	25–23	13–15	99–107	Report

===== Third place =====
Date	Time		Score		Set 1	Set 2	Set 3	Set 4	Set 5	Total	Report
28 Jun	10:30	Poland		Russia							

==== Women ====
Katarzyna Skowrońska-Dolata, Agnieszka Bednarek-Kasza, Izabela Bełcik, Sylwia Pycia, Anna Werblińska, Joanna Wołosz, Katarzyna Zaroślińska, Maja Tokarska, Anna Miros, Agnieszka Kąkolewska, Agata Sawicka, Agata Dujarczyk, Natalia Kurnikowska, Daria Paszek, Coach:Jacek Nawrocki

===== Pool A =====
Pos	Team	Pld	W	L	Pts	SW	SL	SR	SPW	SPL	SPR	Qualification
1	Turkey	5	4	1	13	14	3	4.667	403	319	1.263	Quarterfinals
2	Azerbaijan	5	4	1	11	12	7	1.714	453	409	1.108	Quarterfinals
3	Poland	5	3	2	9	11	8	1.375	425	403	1.055	Quarterfinals
4	Belgium	5	2	3	6	8	11	0.727	393	431	0.912	Quarterfinals
5	Romania	5	1	4	3	4	12	0.333	334	387	0.863	
6	Italy	5	1	4	3	4	12	0.333	325	384	0.846	

Date	Time		Score		Set 1	Set 2	Set 3	Set 4	Set 5	Total	Report
13 Jun	22:00	Poland	3–2	Turkey	18–25	26–24	18–25	25–17	15–11	102–102	Report
15 Jun	22:00	Azerbaijan	3–0	Poland	28–26	25–16	25–23			78–65	Report
17 Jun	11:00	Poland	3–0	Romania	25–23	25–15	25–17			75–55	Report
19 Jun	16:30	Poland	3–0	Italy	25–17	25–18	25–23			75–58	Report
21 Jun	09:00	Belgium	3–2	Poland	25–22	21–25	23–25	25–22	16–14	110–108	Report

===== Quarterfinals =====
Date	Time		Score		Set 1	Set 2	Set 3	Set 4	Set 5	Total	Report
23 Jun	13:00	Poland	3–2	Germany	25–23	25–17	18–25	14–25	15–10	97–100	Report

===== Semifinals =====
Date	Time		Score		Set 1	Set 2	Set 3	Set 4	Set 5	Total	Report
25 Jun	17:00	Poland	3–2	Serbia	25–23	20–25	25–19	22–25	15–12	107–104	Report

==== Gold medal final ====
Date	Time		Score		Set 1	Set 2	Set 3	Set 4	Set 5	Total	Report
27 Jun	19:00	Poland	0–3	Turkey	11–25	19–25	13–25			43–75	

== Wrestling ==
Men's freestyle

Athlete	Event	Qualification	1/8 final	Quarterfinal	Semifinal	Repechage 1	Repechage 2	Final/BM	Rank
Krzysztof Bieńkowski	61 kg	BYE	Redjalari (MKD); L 1–3	Did not advance					
Magomedmurad Gadzhiev	70 kg	Kirov (BUL); W 3–0	Dibrigadzhiyev (AZE); W 3–1	Gulyas (HUN); W 3–1	Tlashadze (GEO); W 4–0	BYE		Gazimagomedov (RUS); L 1–3	2nd place, silver medalist(s)
Krystian Brzozowski	74 kg	BYE		Hajdari (ALB); W 4–0	Kvelashvili (GEO); L 1–3	Did not advance			
Radosław Marcinkiewicz	86 kg	BYE	Zubairov (MKD); W 3–1	Aibuev (FRA); W 3–1	Sadulaev (RUS); L 0–4	BYE		Qadjiyev (AZE); W 3–1	3rd place, bronze medalist(s)
Radosław Baran	97 kg	BYE	Gazyumov (AZE); L 0–4	Did not advance		Ceban (MDA); W 3–0	Saidau (BLR); W 3–1	Gadisov (RUS); L' 0–4	5
Robert Baran	125 kg	BYE	Kumchev (BUL); W 3–0	Akgul (TUR); L 0–5	Did not advance	BYE	Magomedov (AZE); L 0–4	Did not advance	

Men's Greco-Roman

Athlete	Event	1/8 final	Quarterfinal	Semifinal	Repechage 1	Repechage 2	Final/BM	Rank
Arkadiusz Gucik	59 kg	Manouilidis (GRE); L 1–3	Did not advance					
Mateusz Bernatek	66 kg	Harutyunyan (SWE); L 1–3	Did not advance					
Daniel Rutkowski	71 kg	BYE	Savchenko (UKR); L 0–4	Did not advance				
Mateusz Wolny	75 kg	Puscasu (ROU); L 0–3	Did not advance					
Damian Janikowski	85 kg	BYE	Azizsir (GER); L 1–3	Did not advance				
Łukasz Konera	98 kg	Lahti (FIN); L 1–3	Did not advance					

Women's Freestyle

Athlete	Event	1/8 final	Quarterfinal	Semifinal	Repechage 1	Repechage 2	Final/BM	Rank
Iwona Matkowska	48 kg	Vuc (ROU); W 3–0	Blaszka (NED); W 3–0	Stadnyk (AZE); L 0–5	BYE		Sabatie (FRA); W 8–0	3rd place, bronze medalist(s)
Roksana Zasina	53 kg	Tokar (SUI); W 5–0	Horishna (UKR); W 5–0	Shushko (BLR); W 3–0	BYE		Dorogan (AZE); L 1–3	2nd place, silver medalist(s)
Katarzyna Krawczyk	55 kg	Nikolova (BUL); W 3–1	Rivière (FRA); W 3–1	Ologonova (RUS); W 3–1	BYE		Mattsson (SWE); L 1–4	2nd place, silver medalist(s)
Paulina Grabowska	58 kg	A Basset (FRA); L 1–3	Did not advance					
Monika Michalik	63 kg	Caneva (ITA); W 3–1	Tkach (UKR); L 0–3	Did not advance	BYE	Simon (ROU); L 0–5	Did not advance	
Agnieszka Wieszczek-Kordus	69 kg	Popescu (ROU); W 3–1	Vorobeva (RUS); L 0–5	Did not advance				
Daria Osocka	75 kg	Bukina (RUS); L 0–5	Did not advance		BYE	Saenko (MDA); L 0–4	Did not advance	
