= 2014 European Wrestling Championships – Men's freestyle 70 kg =

Wrestling competitions

The men's freestyle 70 kg is a competition featured at the 2014 European Wrestling Championships, and was held in Vantaa, Finland on April 4.

== Medalists ==
Gold	Ruslan Dibirghadzhiyev; Azerbaijan
Silver	Grigor Grigoryan; Armenia
Bronze	Miroslav Kirov; Bulgaria
Bronze	Yakup Gör; Turkey

== Results ==
Legend

- F — Won by fall

=== Main bracket ===
Round of 16
Jere Kunnas (FIN)	0
Ionuț Moise (ROU)	11
Semyon Radulov (UKR)	8
Dmitri Basilashvili (GEO)	1
Miroslav Kirov (BUL)	9
Zaur Efendiev (SRB)	0
Grigor Grigoryan (ARM)	9
Christophe Clavier (FRA)	4
Andreas Triantafyllidis (GRE)	1
Zsombor Gulyás (HUN)	3
Ruslan Dibirghadzhiyev (AZE)	10
Anton Afanasyev (BLR)	2
Roman Dermenji (MDA)	1
Israil Kasumov (RUS)	12
Samet Dülger (GER)	1
Yakup Gör (TUR)	7

Quarterfinals
Ionuț Moise (ROU)	5
Semyon Radulov (UKR)	5
Miroslav Kirov (BUL)	7
Grigor Grigoryan (ARM)	7
Zsombor Gulyás (HUN)	2
Ruslan Dibirghadzhiyev (AZE)	6
Israil Kasumov (RUS)	5
Yakup Gör (TUR)	9

Semifinals
Ionuț Moise (ROU)	8
Grigor Grigoryan (ARM)	13
Ruslan Dibirghadzhiyev (AZE)	5
Yakup Gör (TUR)	4

Final
Grigor Grigoryan (ARM)	2
Ruslan Dibirghadzhiyev (AZE)	12

=== Repechage ===
Repechage round 1
Christophe Clavier (FRA)	0
Miroslav Kirov (BUL)	6
Anton Afanasyev (BLR)	2
Zsombor Gulyás (HUN)	5

Bronze medals
Miroslav Kirov (BUL)	5
Ionuț Moise (ROU)	0
Zsombor Gulyás (HUN)	0
Yakup Gör (TUR)	5
