= Diving at the 2015 European Games – Women's 3 metre springboard =

Women's 3 metre springboard at the 2015 European Games
- Venue: Baku Aquatics Centre
- Dates: 21 June
- Competitors: 28 from 18 nations
- Winning points: 448.25

Medalists
gold medal	Katherine Torrance	Great Britain
silver medal	Ekaterina Nekrasova	Russia
bronze medal	Saskia Oettinghaus	Germany

The women's 3 metre springboard diving competition at the 2015 European Games in Baku took place on 21 June at the Baku Aquatics Centre.

== Results ==
The preliminary round was started at 09:00. The final was held at 19:00.

Green denotes finalists

Rank	Diver	Nationality	Preliminary		Final	
Rank	Diver	Nationality	Points	Rank	Points	Rank
1st place, gold medalist(s)	Katherine Torrance	Great Britain	431.15	1	448.25	1
2nd place, silver medalist(s)	Ekaterina Nekrasova	Russia	413.00	5	443.05	2
3rd place, bronze medalist(s)	Saskia Oettinghaus	Germany	379.75	9	418.35	3
4	Louisa Stawczynski	Germany	422.90	4	414.25	4
5	Maria Polyakova	Russia	426.45	3	411.45	5
6	Diana Shelestyuk	Ukraine	409.60	6	405.75	6
7	Kaja Skrzek	Poland	382.80	8	403.35	7
8	Lydia Rosenthall	Great Britain	427.25	2	395.60	8
9	Frida Källgren	Sweden	409.30	7	392.55	9
10	Natasha MacManus	Ireland	358.20	10	381.50	10
11	Maja Borić	Croatia	355.25	11	376.40	11
12	Laura Anna Granelli	Italy	354.75	12	352.00	12
13	Marharyta Dzhusova	Ukraine	353.85	13	did not advance	
14	Ellen Ek	Sweden	353.30	14	did not advance	
15	Dominika Bąk	Poland	351.10	15	did not advance	
16	Madeline Coquoz	Switzerland	349.85	16	did not advance	
17	Daphne Wils	Netherlands	343.60	17	did not advance	
18	Lorena Tomiek	Croatia	342.80	18	did not advance	
19	Indrė Girdauskaitė	Lithuania	342.45	19	did not advance	
20	Giulia Rogantin	Italy	339.35	20	did not advance	
21	Tamar Sitchinava	Georgia	334.10	21	did not advance	
22	Caroline Lecoeur	France	332.90	22	did not advance	
23	Anne Vilde Tuxen	Norway	331.70	23	did not advance	
24	Katsiaryna Velihurskaya	Belarus	330.85	24	did not advance	
25	Maïssam Naji	France	328.95	25	did not advance	
26	Olqa Bikovskaya	Azerbaijan	328.15	26	did not advance	
27	Hannah Lena Rott	Austria	311.75	27	did not advance	
28	Vivian Barth	Switzerland	305.30	28	did not advance	
