= Swimming at the 2015 European Games – Men's 200 metre butterfly =

Men's 200 metre butterfly at the 2015 European Games
- Venue: Aquatic Palace
- Dates: 24–25 June
- Competitors: 32 from 17 nations
- Winning time: 1:57.04

Medalists
gold medal	Daniil Pakhomov	Russia
silver medal	Giacomo Carini	Italy
bronze medal	Matthias Marsau	France

The men's 200 m butterfly event at the 2015 European Games in Baku took place on 24 and 25 June at the Aquatic Palace.

== Results ==
=== Heats ===
The heats were started on 24 June at 10:15.

Rank	Heat	Lane	Name	Nationality	Time	Notes
1	3	4	Giacomo Carini	Italy	1:58.99	Q, GR
2	4	4	Daniil Pakhomov	Russia	2:00.11	Q
3	4	3	Daniil Antipov	Russia	2:00.32	Q
4	1	5	Roman Shevliakov	Russia	2:01.07	
5	2	5	Matthias Marsau	France	2:01.15	Q
6	2	6	Kaan Özcan	Turkey	2:01.16	Q
7	4	1	Patryk Adamczyk	Poland	2:01.28	Q
8	4	5	Moritz Brandt	Germany	2:01.44	Q
9	2	3	Damian Chrzanowski	Poland	2:01.47	Q
10	3	5	Christian Ferraro	Italy	2:01.53	Q
11	4	2	Márk Tekauer	Hungary	2:01.93	Q
12	2	4	Johannes Tesch	Germany	2:02.31	Q
13	4	6	Athansios Kynigakis	Greece	2:02.70	Q
14	4	7	Joe Litchfield	Great Britain	2:03.08	Q
15	2	7	Markus Malm	Sweden	2:03.09	Q
16	3	6	Kyle Chrisholm	Great Britain	2:03.15	Q
17	4	8	Mateusz Żurawicz	Poland	2:03.74	
18	3	9	Filip Milcevic	Austria	2:03.90	Q
19	3	1	Matteo Bertoldi	Italy	2:03.91	
20	2	2	Ivan Adamovych	Ukraine	2:04.53	
21	1	4	Javier Barrena	Spain	2:04.63	
22	2	1	Blaž Demšar	Slovenia	2:04.70	
23	3	3	Paulus Schön	Germany	2:05.65	
24	1	3	Akaki Vashakidze	Georgia	2:05.95	
25	3	8	Enzo Nardozza	Italy	2:06.92	
26	2	8	Denys Martyniuk	Ukraine	2:07.16	
27	4	0	Henry Kerman	Sweden	2:07.77	
28	2	0	Cla Remund	Switzerland	2:07.94	
29	3	7	Erge Can Gezmis	Turkey	2:08.03	
30	3	0	Nazari Kosylo	Ukraine	2:08.62	
31	3	2	Mikhail Vekovishchev	Russia	2:09.79	
32	4	9	Logan Vanhuys	Belgium	2:10.71	

=== Semifinals ===
The semifinals were started on 24 June at 18:47.

==== Semifinal 1 ====
Rank	Lane	Name	Nationality	Time	Notes
1	4	Daniil Pakhomov	Russia	1:57.74	Q, GR
2	5	Matthias Marsau	France	1:59.07	Q
3	3	Patryk Adamczyk	Poland	2:00.12	q
4	7	Athansios Kynigakis	Greece	2:00.23	q
5	2	Márk Tekauer	Hungary	2:00.31	q
6	6	Damian Chrzanowski	Poland	2:00.60	q
7	1	Markus Malm	Sweden	2:03.36	
8	8	Filip Milcevic	Austria	2:03.70	

==== Semifinal 2 ====
Rank	Lane	Name	Nationality	Time	Notes
1	4	Giacomo Carini	Italy	1:57.80	Q
2	5	Daniil Antipov	Russia	1:59.67	Q
3	6	Moritz Brandt	Germany	2:00.78	
4	7	Johannes Tesch	Germany	2:00.82	
5	3	Kaan Özcan	Turkey	2:01.39	
6	8	Kyle Chrisholm	Great Britain	2:02.32	
7	1	Joe Litchfield	Great Britain	2:02.59	
8	2	Christian Ferraro	Italy	2:04.09	

=== Final ===
The final was held on 25 June at 17:44.

Rank	Lane	Name	Nationality	Time	Notes
1st place, gold medalist(s)	4	Daniil Pakhomov	Russia	1:57.04	GR
2nd place, silver medalist(s)	5	Giacomo Carini	Italy	1:57.46	
3rd place, bronze medalist(s)	3	Matthias Marsau	France	1:58.96	
4	2	Patryk Adamczyk	Poland	1:59.88	
4	6	Daniil Antipov	Russia	1:59.88	
6	7	Athansios Kynigakis	Greece	2:00.26	
7	8	Márk Tekauer	Hungary	2:00.84	
8	1	Damian Chrzanowski	Poland	2:01.23	
