= Wrestling at the 2015 European Games – Men's freestyle 70 kg =

Men's freestyle 70 kg at the 2015 European Games
- Venue: Heydar Aliyev Arena
- Date: 18 June
- Competitors: 17 from 17 nations

Medalists
gold medal	Magomedrasul Gazimagomedov	Russia
silver medal	Magomedmurad Gadzhiev	Poland
bronze medal	Yakup Gör	Turkey
bronze medal	Ruslan Dibirgadjiyev	Azerbaijan

Men's freestyle 70 kg competition at the 2015 European Games in Baku, Azerbaijan, took place on 18 June at the Heydar Aliyev Arena.

== Schedule ==
All times are Azerbaijan Summer Time (UTC+05:00)

Date	Time	Event
Tuesday, 18 June 2015	11:00	1/8 finals
Tuesday, 18 June 2015	13:00	Quarterfinals
Tuesday, 18 June 2015	13:00	Semifinals
Tuesday, 18 June 2015	15:00	Repechage
Tuesday, 18 June 2015	19:00	Finals

== Results ==
Legend

- F — Won by fall

=== Final ===
Final
Magomedrasul Gazimagomedov (RUS)	2
Magomedmurad Gadzhiev (POL)	1

=== Top half ===
Qualifications

1/8 finals
Georg Marchl (AUT)	1
Angelo Costa (ITA)	4
Yakup Gör (TUR)	10
Robert Ollé (SVK)	0
Evgheni Nedealco (MDA)	5
Tim Müller (GER)	4
Zaur Efendiev (SRB)	2
Magomedrasul Gazimagomedov (RUS)	8

Quarterfinals
Angelo Costa (ITA)	0
Yakup Gör (TUR)	10
Evgheni Nedealco (MDA)	0
Magomedrasul Gazimagomedov (RUS)	5

Semifinals
Yakup Gör (TUR)	0
Magomedrasul Gazimagomedov (RUS)	6

=== Bottom half ===
Qualifications
Miroslav Kirov (BUL)	0
Magomedmurad Gadzhiev (POL)	5

1/8 finals
Adrian Moise (ROU)	0
Davit Tlashadze (GEO)	6
Yuri Poliak (ISR)	0
Oleksiy Melnyk (UKR)	10
Zsombor Gulyás (HUN)	4
Zhan Safian (BLR)	3
Ruslan Dibirgadjiyev (AZE)	2
Magomedmurad Gadzhiev (POL)	7

Quarterfinals
Davit Tlashadze (GEO)	4
Oleksiy Melnyk (UKR)	1
Zsombor Gulyás (HUN)	3
Magomedmurad Gadzhiev (POL)	10

Semifinals
Davit Tlashadze (GEO)	0
Magomedmurad Gadzhiev (POL)	10

=== Repechage ===
Repechage round 1
Miroslav Kirov (BUL)	1
Ruslan Dibirgadjiyev (AZE)	4

Repechage round 2
Zaur Efendiev (SRB)	4^{F}
Evgheni Nedealco (MDA)	2
Ruslan Dibirgadjiyev (AZE)	4
Zsombor Gulyás (HUN)	3

Bronze medal match
Zaur Efendiev (SRB)	6
Yakup Gör (TUR)	17
Ruslan Dibrigadzhiyev (AZE)	6
Davit Tlashadze (GEO)	2
