= Natalia Mędrzyk =

Polish volleyball player

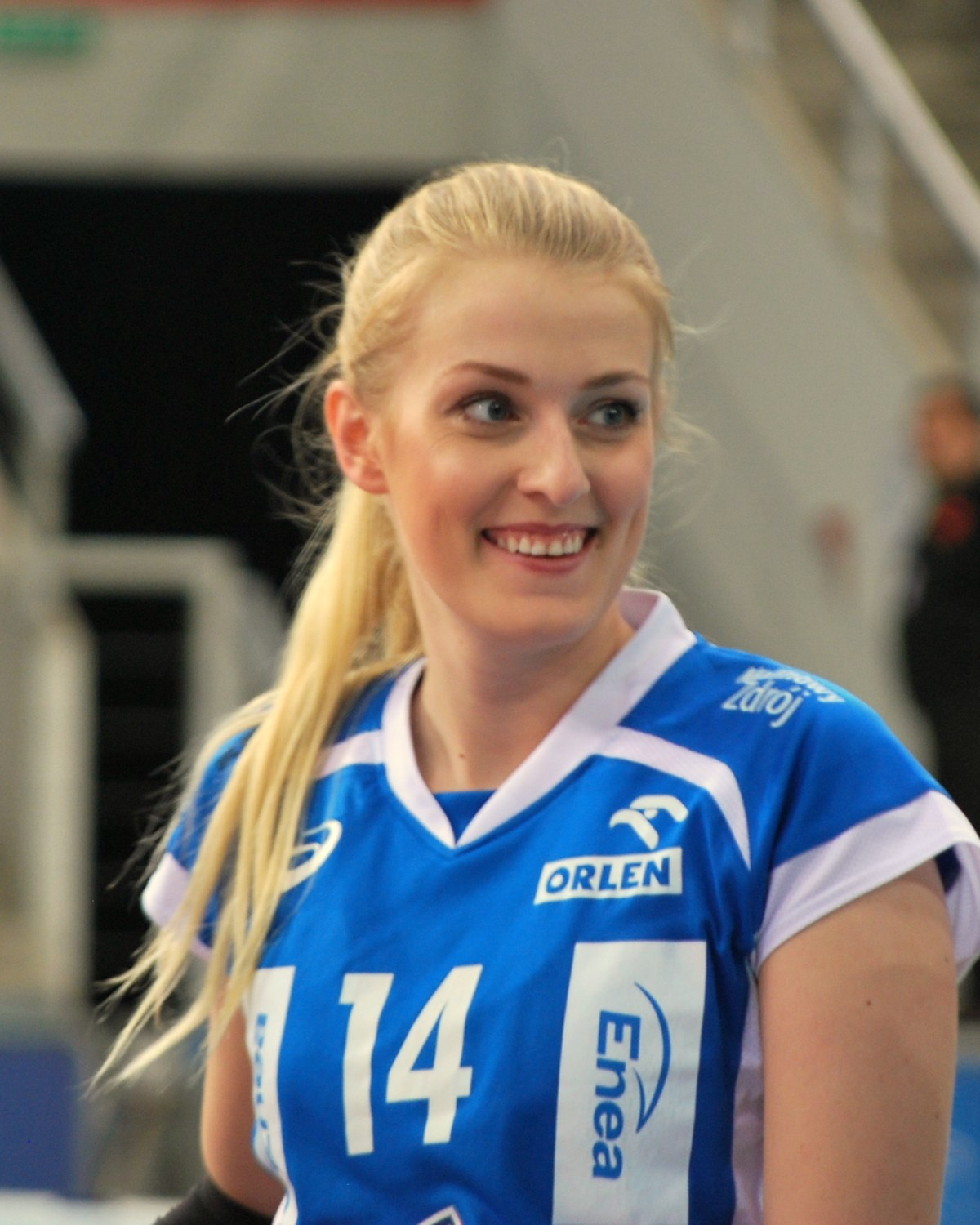

Personal information
- Nationality: Polish
- Born: Natalia Kurnikowska; 13 January 1992 (age 34)
- Height: 1.85 m (6 ft 1 in)
- Weight: 78 kg (172 lb)
- Spike: 293 cm (115 in)
- Block: 282 cm (111 in)

Volleyball information
- Position: Outside hitter

National team
Poland
Honours
Women's volleyball
Representing Poland
European Games
Silver medal – second place	2015 Baku

Natalia Mędrzyk (born Natalia Kurnikowska; 13 January 1992 in Gdańsk) is a Polish volleyball player.

On 13 June 2014, she made her debut for the Poland women's senior national team in a match against Spain in the 2014 Women's European Volleyball League.

She plays for the Polish national team. She participated at the 2017 Women's European Volleyball Championship, and the 2017 FIVB Volleyball World Grand Prix.

In 2024, Poland national team coach Stefano Lavarini gave her the nickname "Mama", as she was the only mother in the Poland national team. She considers herself an introvert.

In the sixth round of the 2024–25 TAURON Liga match between ŁKS Commercecon Łódź and UNI Opole, she played her 300th match and began her 15th season in the highest division of Polish volleyball.
