= Austria at the 2015 European Games =

- IOC code: AUT
- NOC: Austrian Olympic Committee
- Website: www.olympia.at

in Baku, Azerbaijan 12 – 28 June 2015
- Competitors: 145 in 17 sports
- Flag bearer: Andreas Sherhaufer
- Medals Ranked 20th: Gold 2 Silver 7 Bronze 4 Total 13

European Games appearances (overview)
- 2015; 2019; 2023; 2027

Austria competed at the 2015 European Games, in Baku, Azerbaijan from 12 to 28 June 2015.

== Medalists ==
Medals by sport
Sport	1st place, gold medalist(s)	2nd place, silver medalist(s)	3rd place, bronze medalist(s)	Total
Swimming	2	1	0	3
Karate	0	2	0	2
Synchronised swimming	0	1	1	2
Athletics	0	1	0	1
Canoe sprint	0	1	0	1
Volleyball	0	1	0	1
Judo	0	0	1	1
Shooting	0	0	1	1
Table tennis	0	0	1	1
Total	3	6	4	13

Medal	Name	Sport	Event	Date
Gold	Steffan Sebastian	Swimming	Men's 200 metre individual medley	25 June
Gold	Caroline Pilhatsch	Swimming	Women's 50 metre backstroke	25 June
Silver	Mixed team: Anita Baielr; Ekemini Bassey; Dominik Distelberger; Elisabeth Eberl; Michaela Egger; Nikolaus Franzmair; Markus Fuchs; Mario Gebhard; Benjamin Grill; Kira Grunberg; Christoph Haslauer; Stefanie Huber; Ina Huemer; Dominik Hufnagl; Thomas Kain; Matthias Kaserer; Julio Kellerer; Paul Kilbertus; Viola Kleiser; Josip Kopic; Anita Baielr; Sarah Lagger; Nina Luyer; Pamela Manzerdorfen; Gunther Matzinger; Gerhard Mayer; Verena Menapace; Elisabeth Niedereder; Valentin Pfeil; Verena Preiner; Brenton Rowe; Roman Schmied; Anita Baielr; Carina Schrempf; Beate Schrott; Julia Schwarzinger; Benjamin Siart; Julia Siart; Dominik Sedliaczek; Christian Smetana; Christian Steinhammer; Alexandra Toth; Andreas Vojta; Susanne Walli; Veronika Watzek; Lukas Weißhaidinger; Jennifer Wenth; Eva-Maria Wimberger	Athletics	Team Championships	23 June
Silver	Bettina Plank	Karate	Women's 50 kg	13 June
Silver	Alisa Theresa Buchinger	Karate	Women's 68 kg	14 June
Silver	Anna-Maria Alexandri; Eirini-Marina Alexandri	Synchronised swimming	Women's duet	15 June
Silver	Yvonne Schuring	Canoe sprint	Women's K-1 500 metres	16 June
Silver	Lena Plesiutschnig; Katharina Schützenhöfer	Volleyball	Women's beach	20 June
Silver	Caroline Pilhatsch	Swimming	Women's 50 metre butterfly	27 June
Bronze	Robert Gardos; Stefan Fegerl; Daniel Habesohn	Table tennis	Men's team	15 June
Bronze	Anna-Maria Alexandri	Synchronised swimming	Solo	16 June
Bronze	Olivia Hofmann	Shooting	Women's 50 metre rifle three positions	19 June
Bronze	Bernadette Graf	Judo	Women's 70 kg	26 June

== Team ==
Competitors from Austria per sport
Sport	Men	Women	Total
Archery	1	1	2
Badminton	1	0	1
Beach volley	2	4	6
Boxing	1	0	1
Canoe sprint	3	1	4
Cycling mountain bike	1	1	2
Cycling road	1	1	2
Diving	1	3	4
Fencing	1	1	2
Gymnastics aerobic	0	5	5
Gymnastics artistic	3	0	3
Gymnastics rhythmic	0	6	6
Judo	3	1	4
Karate	1	1	2
Shooting	5	3	8
Swimming	4	12	16
Table tennis	1	0	1
Taekwondo	0	1	1
Triathlon	0	1	1
Volleyball	12	0	12
Wrestling	9	2	11
Total	51	49	100

== Archery ==
Athlete	Event	Ranking round		Round of 64	Round of 32	Round of 16	Quarterfinals	Semifinals	Final / BM	
Athlete	Event	Score	Seed	Opposition Score	Opposition Score	Opposition Score	Opposition Score	Opposition Score	Opposition Score	Rank
Alexander Bertschler	Men's individual	657	28	Fernandez (ESP); L 0–6	Did not advance					33
Sabine Mayrhofer-Gritsch	Women's individual	611	50	Schuh (FRA); L 0–6	Did not advance					33
Sabine Mayrhofer-Gritsch; Alexander Bertschler	Mixed team	1268	21	—N/a		Did not advance				21

== Athletics ==
Austria won the athletics mixed team event by winning 460 points.

=== Men's ===
Athlete	Event	Result	Rank	Points
Markus Fuchs	100m	10.74	3	12
Ekemini Bassey	200m	21.71	8	7
Mario Gebhardt	400m	47.96	4	11
Nikolaus Franzmair	800m	1:53.13	7	8
Andreas Vojta	1500m	3:51.28	3	12
Brenton Rowe	3000m	8:05.62	2	13
Valentin Pfeil	5000m	14:54.66	4	11
Christian Steinhammer	3000m steeplechase	8:53.98	2	13
Dominik Siedlaczek	110m hurdles	14.07	1	14
Thomas Kain	400m hurdles	51.15	2	13
Christoph Haslauer; Markus Fuchs; Benjamin Grill; Ekemini Bassey	4x100m relay	40.36	2	13
Dominik Hufnagl; Gunther Matzinger; Thomas Kain; Mario Gebhardt	4x400m relay	3:17.37	7	8
Josip Kopic	High jump	2.15	5	10
Paul Kilbertus	Pole vault	5.10	2	13
Dominik Distelberger	Long jump	7.30	3	12
Roman Schmied	Triple jump	15.22	7	8
Lukas Weißhaidinger	Shot put	18.48	3	12
Gerhard Mayer	Discus throw	59.48	1	14
Benjamin Siart	Hammer throw	56.77	3	12
Matthias Kaserer	Javelin throw	64.56	5	10

=== Women's ===
Athlete	Event	Result	Rank	Points
Viola Kleiser	100m	11.95	4	11
Viola Kleiser	200m	23.85	3	12
Susanne Walli	400m	53.65	2	13
Carina Schrempf	800m	2:05.55	4	11
Elisabeth Niedereder	1500m	4:29.23	4	11
Jennifer Wenth	3000m	9:11.98	1	14
Anita Baierl	5000m	16:33.09	1	14
Stefanie Huber	3000m steeplechase	11:09.22	4	11
Beate Schrott	110m hurdles	13.18	1	14
Verena Menapace	400m hurdles	58.94	1	14
Eva-Maria Wimberger; Viola Kleiser; Alexandra Toth; Julia Schwarzinger	4x100m relay	45.24	3	12
Julia Schwarzinger; Susanne Walli; Verena Menapace; Carina Schrempf	4x400m relay	3:37.51	2	13
Nina Luyer	High jump	1.70	8	7
Kira Grunberg	Pole vault	4.35	1	14
Sarah Lagger	Long jump	6.17	3	12
Michaela Egger	Triple jump	13.03	4	11
Veronika Watzek	Shot put	12.73	8	7
Veronika Watzek	Discus throw	47.40	5	10
Julia Siart	Hammer throw	50.35	5	10
Elisabeth Eberl	Javelin throw	49.45	2	13

== Badminton ==
Athlete	Event	Group stage				Round of 16	Quarterfinal	Semifinal	Final / BM	
Athlete	Event	Opposition Score	Opposition Score	Opposition Score	Rank	Opposition Score	Opposition Score	Opposition Score	Opposition Score	Rank
Luka Wraber	Men's singles	Krauklis (LAT); W 21–10, 21–12	Rogalski (POL); L 16–21, 16–21	Kushnir (BLR); W 21–12, 21–9	2 Q	Koukal (CZE); L 12–21, 16–21	Did not advance			

== Beach volleyball ==
Athlete	Event	Preliminary round				Round of 24	Round of 16	Quarterfinals	Semifinals	Final	
Athlete	Event	Opposition Score	Opposition Score	Opposition Score	Rank	Opposition Score	Opposition Score	Opposition Score	Opposition Score	Opposition Score	Rank
Peter Eglseer; Daniel Müllner	Men's tournament	Kavalenka – Dziadkou (BLR); L 1–2	Pļaviņš – Regža (LAT); L 1–2	Nurminen – Piippo (FIN); W 2–1	3 q	Kosiak – Rudoł (POL); L 1–2	Did not advance				
Katharina Schützenhöfer; Lena Plesiutschnig	Women's tournament	Dumbauskaitė – Povilaitytė (LTU); L 1–2	Cunha – Liubymova (AZE); W 2–0	Bang – Olsen (DEN); W 2–0	2 q	Abalakina – Dabizha (RUS); W 2–0	van Gestel – van der Vlist (NED); W 2–1	Prokopeva – Syrtseva (RUS); W 2–1	Dumbauskaitė – Povilaitytė (LTU); W 2–0	Eiholzer – Betschart (SUI); L 1–2	2nd place, silver medalist(s)
Valerie Teufl; Bianca Zass	Women's tournament	Giombini – Toti (ITA); L 0–2	Žolnerčíková – Jakubšova (CZE); L 0–2	Ozoliņa – Graudiņa (LAT); L 1–2	4	Did not advance					

== Boxing ==
Athlete	Event	Round of 32	Round of 16	Quarterfinals	Semifinals	Final	
Athlete	Event	Opposition Result	Opposition Result	Opposition Result	Opposition Result	Opposition Result	Rank
Stefan Nikolic	Men's 91kg	Richards (SWE); L 0–3	Did not advance				

== Canoe sprint ==
=== Men ===
Athlete	Event	Heats		Semifinals		Final	
Athlete	Event	Time	Rank	Time	Rank	Time	Rank
Christoph Kornfeind	K-1 1000m	3:51.215	7	Did not advance			
Christoph Kornfeind	K-1 5000m	—N/a				21:52.276	14

=== Women ===
Athlete	Event	Heats		Semifinals		Final	
Athlete	Event	Time	Rank	Time	Rank	Time	Rank
Yvonne Schuring	K-1 500m	1:52.018	2 Q	1:48.178	2 Q	2:04.708	2nd place, silver medalist(s)
Yvonne Schuring	K-1 5000m	—N/a				24:17.057	12

== Cycling ==
=== Road cycling ===
Athlete	Event	Time	Rank
Andreas Hofer	Men's road race	5:32.00	54
Andreas Hofer	Men's individual time trial	1:04:48.51	23
Jan Sokol	Men's road race	5:32.00	52
Jacqueline Hahn	Women's road race	3:33.69	40
Martina Ritter	Women's road race	3:25.53	22
Martina Ritter	Women's individual time trial	33:51.77	5
Gregor Raggl	Men's cross country	1:48:16	14
Lisa Mitterbauer	Women's cross country	1:39:07	12

=== BMX ===
Athlete	Event	Qualification		Motos		Semifinals		Final	
Athlete	Event	Time	Rank	Time	Rank	Time	Rank	Time	Rank
Tobias Franek	Men's BMX	35.320	23	37.648	7	Did not advance			

== Diving ==
=== Men ===
Athlete	Event	Preliminaries		Final	
Athlete	Event	Points	Rank	Points	Rank
Alexander Mario Hart	1m springboard	356.45	22	Did not advance	
Alexander Mario Hart	3m springboard	367.80	29	Did not advance	
Moritz Pail	1m springboard	315.95	29	Did not advance	
Moritz Pail	3m springboard	371.40	28	Did not advance	
Alexander Mario Hart; Moritz Pail	3m synchronized springboard	—N/a		230.61	11

=== Women ===
Athlete	Event	Preliminaries		Final	
Athlete	Event	Points	Rank	Points	Rank
Hannah Lena Rott	3m springboard	311.75	27	Did not advance	
Michelle Staudenherz	1m springboard	278.55	26	Did not advance	
Hannah Lena Rott; Michelle Staudenherz	3m synchronized springboard	—N/a		215.55	10

== Fencing ==
Athlete	Event	Pool matches							Round of 32	Round of 16	Quarterfinal	Semifinal	Final / BM
Athlete	Event	Opposition Score	Opposition Score	Opposition Score	Opposition Score	Opposition Score	Opposition Score	Rank	Opposition Score	Opposition Score	Opposition Score	Opposition Score	Rank
René Pranz	Men's individual foil	Uftring (GER); W 5–4	Tofalides (GBR); W 5–4	Safin (RUS); W 5–4	Surwilło (POL); W 5–3	Or (ISR); W 5–4	—N/a	1 Q	Bye	Zherebchenko (RUS); L 8–15	Did not advance		
Matthias Willau	Men's individual sabre	Hübers (GER); L 4–5	Arnaudov (BUL); W 5–3	Aghakishiyev (AZE); W 5–3	Proskura (RUS); L 0–5	Pellegrini (ITA); L 1–5	—N/a	4 Q	Van Holsbeke (BEL); L 8–15	Did not advance			
Paula Schmidl	Women's individual épée	Gherman (ROU); L 4–5	Marinuk (ISR); W 5–4	Kun (HUN); L 2–5	Rizzi (ITA); L 4–5	Zvereva (RUS); L 2–5	Malikova (AZE); W 5–4	6	Did not advance				
Olivia Wohlgemuth	Women's individual foil	Gólya (HUN); L 1–5	Cellerová (SVK); W 5–0	Yakovleva (RUS); W 5–3	Leleyko (UKR); L 3–5	Chrzanowska (POL); W 5–4	—N/a	3 Q	Cini (ITA); L 9–15	Did not advance			

== Gymnastics ==
=== Artistic ===
Team

Athlete	Event	Final					
Athlete	Event	Apparatus				Total	Rank
Athlete	Event	V	UB	BB	F	Total	Rank
Jasmin Mader	Team	13.800	12.500	10.466	12.666	—N/a	
Marlies Mannersdorfer	Team	12.933	9.600	11.566	11.366	—N/a	
Jessica Stebinger	Team	—N/a	9.233	—N/a		—N/a	
Total	Team	26.733	22.100	22.032	24.032	94.987	21

Individual events

Athlete	Event	Apparatus				Total	Rank
Athlete	Event	V	UB	BB	F	Total	Rank
Jasmin Mader	All-around	13.800	12.500	10.466	12.666	49.432	40

=== Rhythmic ===
Austria has qualified two athletes after their performance at the 2013 Rhythmic Gymnastics European Championships.

- Individual – 2 quota places

Athlete	Event	Final					
Athlete	Event	Hoop	Ball	Clubs	Ribbon	Total	Rank
Nicol Ruprecht	Individual all-around	17.300	17.300	17.450	17.350	69.400	11
Nicol Ruprecht	Clubs	—N/a		17.250	—N/a	17.250	6
Natascha Wegscheider	Individual all-around	15.900	16.100	16.150	15.950	64.100	19

== Judo ==
=== Men ===
Athlete	Event	Round of 32	Round of 16	Quarterfinals	Semifinals	Repechage	Final / BM	
Athlete	Event	Opposition Result	Opposition Result	Opposition Result	Opposition Result	Opposition Result	Opposition Result	Rank
Ludwig Paischer	Men's 60kg	Reinvall (FIN); W 000–000	Chammartin (SUI); L 000–100	Did not advance				
Marcel Ott	Men's 81kg	Bye	Nifontov (RUS); L 000–100	Did not advance				
Christoph Kronberger	Men's 100kg	Jørgensen (DEN); L 000–101	Did not advance					
Daniel Allerstorfer	Men's +100kg	Mettis (EST); L 000–100	Did not advance					

=== Women ===
Athlete	Event	Round of 32	Round of 16	Quarterfinals	Semifinals	Repechage	Final / BM	
Athlete	Event	Opposition Result	Opposition Result	Opposition Result	Opposition Result	Opposition Result	Opposition Result	Rank
Sabrina Filzmoser	Women's 57kg	Bye	Wächter (GER); W 100–001	Pavia (FRA); L 000–110	—N/a	Verhagen (NED); L 000–100	Did not advance	
Tina Zeltner	Women's 57kg	Amaron (SUI); W 110–000	Karakas (HUN); L 000–100	Did not advance				
Kathrin Unterwurzacher	Women's 63kg	Bye	Milošević (SLO); W 001–000	Trajdos (GER); L 101–000	—N/a	Cachola (POR); L 000–003	Did not advance	
Bernadette Graf	Women's 70kg	Bye	Breitenbach (HUN); W 001–000	Kłys (POL); W 100–000	Vargas Koch (GER); L 000–112	—N/a	Bronze medal match Gercsák (HUN); W 000–000	3rd place, bronze medalist(s)

== Karate ==
Athlete	Event	Group stage				Semifinals	Final / BM	
Athlete	Event	Opposition Result	Opposition Result	Opposition Result	Rank	Opposition Result	Opposition Result	Rank
Bettina Plank	Women's 50kg	Aliyeva (AZE); W 1–0	Beruleč (CRO); W 1–0	Özçelik (TUR); L 0–3	2 Q	Recchia (FRA); W 2–0	Özçelik (TUR); L 0–1	2nd place, silver medalist(s)
Alisa Buchinger	Women's 68kg	Panetsidou (GRE); W 2–1	Zaretska (AZE); W 4–0	Vizcaíno (ESP); W 1–0	1 Q	Quirici (SUI); W 2–0	Zaretska (AZE); L 1–8	2nd place, silver medalist(s)

== Sambo ==
Athlete	Event	Quarterfinals	Semifinals	Final / BM	
Athlete	Event	Opposition Result	Opposition Result	Opposition Result	Rank
Kevin Rasit Cekic	Men's +100kg	Tonoyan (UKR); L 0–4	Did not advance		

== Shooting ==
Men

Athlete	Event	Qualification		Final	
Athlete	Event	Points	Rank	Total	Rank
Sebastian Kuntschik	Skeet	117	21	Did not advance	
Thomas Mathis	10m air rifle	614.0	35	Did not advance	
Thomas Mathis	50m rifle 3 positions	1142	20	Did not advance	
Thomas Mathis	50m rifle prone	615.6	10	Did not advance	
Andreas Scherhaufer	Trap	111	30	Did not advance	
Alexander Schmirl	10m air rifle	624.0	13	Did not advance	
Alexander Schmirl	50m rifle 3 positions	1147	16	Did not advance	
Alexander Schmirl	50m rifle prone	609.4	31	Did not advance	

Women

Athlete	Event	Qualification		Semifinals		Final	
Athlete	Event	Points	Rank	Points	Rank	Total	Rank
Olivia Hofmann	10m air rifle	412.6	18	—N/a		Did not advance	
Olivia Hofmann	50m rifle 3 positions	579	7 Q	—N/a		443.2	3rd place, bronze medalist(s)
Stephanie Obermoser	10m air rifle	410.5	29	—N/a		Did not advance	
Stephanie Obermoser	50m rifle 3 positions	563	32	—N/a		Did not advance	
Sylvia Steiner	10m air pistol	385	8 Q	—N/a		76.7	8
Sylvia Steiner	25m pistol	585 GR	1 Q	10	7	Did not advance	

Mixed

Athlete	Event	Qualification		Semifinals		Final	
Athlete	Event	Points	Rank	Points	Rank	Total	Rank
Stephanie Obermoser; Alexander Schmirl	Mixed 10m air rifle	518.5	5 Q	204.9	3	Did not advance	

== Swimming ==
Men

Athlete	Event	Heat		Semifinal		Final	
Athlete	Event	Time	Rank	Time	Rank	Time	Rank
Lukas Ambros	400m freestyle	4:03.29	37	Did not advance			
Lukas Ambros	800m freestyle	—N/a				8:13.11	9
Lukas Ambros	1500m freestyle	—N/a				15:43.26	10
Robin Grünberger	50m freestyle	23.61	24	Did not advance			
Robin Grünberger	100m freestyle	51.97	39	Did not advance			
Dominik Hitzinger	100m breaststroke	1:05.24	31	Did not advance			
Dominik Hitzinger	200m breaststroke	2:19.72	18 q	Swim-off; 2:21.38	2	Did not advance	
Filip Milcevic	50m butterfly	24.73	19 Q	24.74	8	Did not advance	
Filip Milcevic	100m butterfly	54.62	11 Q	54.76	7	Did not advance	
Filip Milcevic	200m butterfly	2:03.90	18 Q	2:03.70	8	Did not advance	
Christopher Rothbauer	50m breaststroke	29.44	26	Did not advance			
Christopher Rothbauer	100m breaststroke	1:03.25	12 Q	1:03.42	5	Did not advance	
Christopher Rothbauer	200m breaststroke	2:18.12	14 Q	2:19.43	6	Did not advance	
Sebastian Steffan	200m freestyle	1:51.79	10	Withdrew			
Sebastian Steffan	200m individual medley	2:01.75 GR	1 Q	2:01.92	1 Q	2:01.39 GR	1st place, gold medalist(s)
Sebastian Steffan	400m individual medley	4:27.05	11	Did not advance			
Lukas Ambros; Robin Grünberger; Filip Milcevic; Sebastian Steffan	4x200m freestyle relay	7:48.42	11	Did not advance			

Women

Athlete	Event	Heat		Semifinal		Final	
Athlete	Event	Time	Rank	Time	Rank	Time	Rank
Caroline Hechenbichler	50m freestyle	27.16	28	Did not advance			
Caroline Hechenbichler	50m butterfly	28.25	19	Did not advance			
Caroline Hechenbichler	100m butterfly	1:01.98	9 Q	1:01.93	6	Did not advance	
Caroline Hechenbichler	200m butterfly	2:19.04	14 Q	2:17.85	7	Did not advance	
Lena Opatril	100m freestyle	59.18	42	Did not advance			
Lena Opatril	200m freestyle	2:06.48	29	Did not advance			
Caroline Pilhatsch	50m backstroke	28.80	2 Q	28.63 GR	1 Q	28.60 GR	1st place, gold medalist(s)
Caroline Pilhatsch	100m backstroke	1:03.91	=7 Q	1:03.83	4	Did not advance	
Caroline Pilhatsch	50m butterfly	27.60	4 Q	27.46	1 Q	27.18	2nd place, silver medalist(s)
Sara Rashid Taghipour	100m backstroke	1:06.20	26	Did not advance			
Sara Rashid Taghipour	200m backstroke	2:18.95	11 Q	2:18.24	6	Did not advance	
Conni Rott	50m freestyle	27.10	27	Did not advance			
Conni Rott	50m backstroke	30.25	20	Did not advance			
Cornelia Rott	100m freestyle	58.64	28	Did not advance			
Annabelle Schwaiger	100m breaststroke	1:13.33	23	Did not advance			
Annabelle Schwaiger	200m breaststroke	2:33.36	9 Q	DSQ		Did not advance	
Esther Uhl	400m freestyle	4:32.40	37	Did not advance			
Esther Uhl	800m freestyle	—N/a				9:30.63	24
Caroline Hechenbichler; Lena Opatril; Cornelia Rott; Esther Uhl	4x100m freestyle relay	3:55.80	8 Q	—N/a		3:55.58	8
Caroline Hechenbichler; Lena Opatril; Sara Rashid Taghipour; Esther Uhl	4x200m freestyle relay	8:32.59	8 Q	—N/a		8:32.52	8
Caroline Hechenbichler; Caroline Pilhatsch; Cornelia Rott; Annabelle Schwaiger	4x100m medley relay	4:25.25	13	Did not advance			

Mixed

Athlete	Event	Heat		Final	
Athlete	Event	Time	Rank	Time	Rank
Robin Grünberger; Caroline Hechenbichler; Filip Milcevic; Lena Opatril	4x100m freestyle relay	3:41.18	9	Did not advance	

== Table tennis ==
Athlete	Event	First round	Second round	Third round	Quarterfinals	Semifinals	Final / BM	
Athlete	Event	Opposition Result	Opposition Result	Opposition Result	Opposition Result	Opposition Result	Opposition Result	Rank
Stefan Fegerl	Men's singles	Bye	Górak (POL); W 4–3	Kou (UKR); L 1–4	Did not advance			
Robert Gardos	Men's singles	Bye	Tokić (SLO); L 1–4	Did not advance				
Robert Gardos; Stefan Fegerl; Daniel Habesohn	Men's team	—N/a		Croatia (CRO); W 3–0	Russia (RUS); W 3–0	Portugal (POR); L 1–3	Germany (GER); W 3–0	3rd place, bronze medalist(s)
Liu Jia	Women's singles	Bye	Madarász (HUN); W 4–1	Li (NED); L 0–4	Did not advance			
Sofia Polcanova	Women's singles	Bye	Feher (SRB); W 4–0	Han (GER); L 0–4	Did not advance			
Li Qiangbing; Liu Jia; Sofia Polcanova	Women's team	—N/a		Czech Republic (CZE); L 1–3	Did not advance			

== Triathlon ==
- Women's – Theresa Moser

Athlete	Event	Swim (1.5 km)	Bike (40 km)	Run (10 km)	Total Time	Rank
Theresa Moser	Women's	22:12	0:54	Lapped		

== Wrestling ==
Men's freestyle

Athlete	Event	Qualification	Round of 16	Quarterfinal	Semifinal	Final / BM	
Athlete	Event	Opposition Result	Opposition Result	Opposition Result	Opposition Result	Opposition Result	Rank
Maximilian Ausserleitner	Men's 65kg	Popov (ISR); L 2–4	Did not advance				
Georg Marchl	Men's 70kg	Bye	Costa (ITA); L 1–4	Did not advance			
Dominic Peter	Men's 86kg	Zvirbulis (LAT); L 0–10	Did not advance				
Johannes Ludescher	Men's 97kg	Ceban (MDA); L 1–11	Did not advance				

Men's Greco-Roman

Athlete	Event	Qualification	Round of 16	Quarterfinal	Semifinal	Final / BM	
Athlete	Event	Opposition Result	Opposition Result	Opposition Result	Opposition Result	Opposition Result	Rank
Benedikt Puffer	Men's 66kg	Jäger (HUN); L 0–10	Did not advance				
Florian Marchl	Men's 75kg	Žugaj (CRO); L 0–7	Did not advance				
Michael Wagner	Men's 80kg	Bye	Huseynov (AZE); L 0–11	Did not advance			
Amer Hrustanović	Men's 85kg	Bye	Chakvetadze (RUS); L 0–4	Did not advance			
Daniel Gastl	Men's 98kg	Bye	Noumonvi (FRA); L 0–4	Did not advance			
Lukas Hörmann	Men's 130kg	Bye	Kajaia (GEO); L 0–5	Did not advance			

Women's freestyle

Athlete	Event	Round of 16	Quarterfinal	Semifinal	Repechage	Final / BM	
Athlete	Event	Opposition Result	Opposition Result	Opposition Result	Opposition Result	Opposition Result	Rank
Sandra Seidl	Women's 60kg	Blekaitytė (LTU); L 0–6	Did not advance				
Martina Kuenz	Women's 69kg	Domikaitytė (LTU); W 4–0	Stadnik (UKR); L 2–6	—N/a	Manolova (BUL); W 7–1	Focken (GER); L 0–4	=5
