= Anastasiya Kirpichnikova =

French swimmer (born 2000)

Anastasiia Kirpichnikova
Personal information
- Nationality: Russia (before April 2023); France (since April 2023)
- Born: 24 June 2000 (age 26) Asbest, Russia
- Height: 1.73 m (5 ft 8 in)
- Weight: 63 kg (139 lb)

Sport
- Sport: Swimming
- Strokes: Freestyle
- Coach: Philippe Lucas
Medal record
Women's swimming
Representing France
Olympic Games
Silver medal – second place	2024 Paris	1500 m freestyle
Representing Russian Swimming Federation
World Championships (SC)
Silver medal – second place	2021 Abu Dhabi	800 m freestyle
Representing Russia
European Championships (LC)
Silver medal – second place	2020 Budapest	800 m freestyle
Silver medal – second place	2020 Budapest	1500 m freestyle
Bronze medal – third place	2020 Budapest	4×200 m mixed freestyle
European Championships (SC)
Gold medal – first place	2021 Kazan	400 m freestyle
Gold medal – first place	2021 Kazan	800 m freestyle
Gold medal – first place	2021 Kazan	1500 m freestyle
European Games
Gold medal – first place	2015 Baku	4×200 m freestyle
Silver medal – second place	2015 Baku	800 m freestyle
Bronze medal – third place	2015 Baku	400 m freestyle

Anastasiia Kirpichnikova (born 24 June 2000) is a Russian-born French swimmer. In 2019, she represented Russia at the 2019 World Aquatics Championships held in Gwangju, South Korea. She competed in the women's 800 metre freestyle and women's 1500 metre freestyle events. In both events she did not advance to compete in the final. She also participated at the 2020 Summer Olympics in the women's 1500m, 800m, and women's swimming marathon. In April 2023, it was disclosed that she would represent France. She won the silver medal in the 1500 metre freestyle at the 2024 Paris Olympics, representing France.
