= Ruslan Dibirgadjiyev =

Azerbaijani freestyle wrestler

Medal record

Men's Freestyle wrestling

Representing Azerbaijan

European Championships
Gold medal – first place	2014 Vantaa	70 kg

European Games
Bronze medal – third place	2015 Baku	70 kg

Ruslan Adilkhanovich Dibirghadzhiyev (Azerbaijani: Ruslan Dibirhacıyev, Russian: Руслан Адилханович Дибиргаджиев; born 20 July 1988, Dagestan) is an Avar Russian naturalized Azerbaijani freestyle wrestler. He competed at the 70 kg division in the 2014 European Wrestling Championships and won the gold medal after beating Grigor Grigoryan of Armenia.
