= Matea Sumajstorčić =

Croatian swimmer (born 1999)

Personal information
- Nationality: Croatian
- Born: 5 April 1999 (age 27)

Sport
- Sport: Swimming

Matea Sumajstorčić (born 5 April 1999) is a Croatian swimmer. She represented Croatia at the 2019 World Aquatics Championships held in Gwangju, South Korea. She competed in the women's 800 metre freestyle and women's 1500 metre freestyle events. In both events she did not advance to compete in the final.
