= Latvia at the 2015 European Games =

- IOC code: LAT
- NOC: Latvian Olympic Committee
- Website: www.olimpiade.lv

in Baku, Azerbaijan 12 – 28 June 2015
- Competitors: 67
- Flag bearer: Lauris Strautmanis
- Medals Ranked 31st: Gold 1 Silver 0 Bronze 2 Total 3

European Games appearances (overview)
- 2015; 2019; 2023; 2027

Latvia competed at the 2015 European Games, in Baku, Azerbaijan from 12 to 28 June 2015.

== Medalists ==
Medal	Name	Sport	Event	Date
Gold	Martins Plavins; Haralds Regza	Beach volleyball	Men's tournament	21 June
Bronze	Anastasija Grigorjeva	Wrestling	Women's freestyle 63 kg	15 June
Bronze	Aleksejs Rumjancevs	Canoe sprint	Men's K-1 200 metres	16 June

== Archery ==
Athlete	Event	Ranking round		Round of 64	Round of 32	Round of 16	Quarterfinals	Semifinals	Final / BM	
Athlete	Event	Score	Seed	Opposition Score	Opposition Score	Opposition Score	Opposition Score	Opposition Score	Opposition Score	Rank
Eduards Lapsins	Men's individual	589	62	van den Berg (Netherlands); L 0–6	Did not advance					33
Anete Kreicberga	Women's individual	604	54	Richter (Germany); L 0–6	Did not advance					33
Anete Kreicberga; Eduards Lapsins	Mixed Team	1193	28	—N/a		Did not advance				28

== Badminton ==
A single Lativian athlete qualified.

- Women's singles – 1 quota place

== Canoe sprint ==
A single Lativian athlete qualified.

- Men's K1 200 m – 1 quota place

== Gymnastics ==
=== Artistic ===
- Women's – 3 quota places

=== Rhythmic ===
Latvia qualified one athlete after the performance at the 2013 Rhythmic Gymnastics European Championships.

- Individual – 1 quota place

== Triathlon ==
- Men – Andrejs Dmitrijevs
