= Iceland at the 2015 European Games =

- IOC code: ISL
- NOC: National Olympic and Sports Association of Iceland
- Website: www.isi.is

in Baku, Azerbaijan 12 – 28 June 2015
- Competitors: 11 in 6 sports

European Games appearances (overview)
- 2015; 2019; 2023; 2027

Iceland competed at the 2015 European Games, in Baku, Azerbaijan from 12 to 28 June 2015.

== Archery ==
Athlete	Event	Ranking round		Round of 64	Round of 32	Round of 16	Quarterfinals	Semifinals	Final / BM	
Athlete	Event	Score	Seed	Opposition Score	Opposition Score	Opposition Score	Opposition Score	Opposition Score	Opposition Score	Rank
Sigurjón Atli Sigurðsson	Men's individual	614	58	Prilepov (Belarus); L 3–7	Did not advance					33

== Badminton ==
- Men's singles – Kari Gunnarsson
- Women's singles – Sara Högnadóttir

== Fencing ==
- Women's individual sabre – Thorbjörg Ágústsdóttir

== Gymnastics ==
=== Artistic ===
- Men's – Valgaro Reinhardsson
- Women's – Thelma Rut Hermannsdottir, Dominiqua Alma Belanyi, Norma Dogg Robertsdottir

== Judo ==
- Men's 81 kg – Sveinbjörn Jun Iura
- Men's 100 kg – Thormóður Arni Jonsson

== Karate ==
- Women's 68 kg – Telma Rut Frimannsdottir

== Shooting ==
- Men's air pistol – Ásgeir Sigurgeirsson
