= Czech Republic at the 2015 European Games =

- IOC code: CZE
- NOC: Czech Olympic Committee
- Website: www.olympic.cz

in Baku, Azerbaijan 12 – 28 June 2015
- Competitors: 126
- Flag bearer: Tomas Svoboda
- Medals Ranked 32nd: Gold 0 Silver 2 Bronze 5 Total 7

European Games appearances (overview)
- 2015; 2019; 2023; 2027

Czech Republic competed at the 2015 European Games, in Baku, Azerbaijan from 12 to 28 June 2015.

== Medalists ==
Medal	Name	Sport	Event	Date
Silver	Martin Fuksa	Canoe sprint	Men's C1-1000m	15 June
Silver	Lukáš Krpálek	Judo	Men's 100 kg	27 June
Bronze	Martin Fuksa	Canoe sprint	Men's C1-200m	16 June
Bronze	Hana Matelová; Renata Štrbíková; Iveta Vacenovská	Table tennis	Women's team	15 June
Bronze	Přemysl Kubala; Jan Hadrava	Beach volleyball	Men's tournament	21 June
Bronze	Petr Vakoč	Cycling	Men's road race	21 June
Bronze	Aneta Hladíková	Cycling	Women's BMX	28 June

== Badminton ==
Men

Athlete	Event	Group Stage				Round of 16	Quarterfinal	Semifinal	Final / BM	
Athlete	Event	Opposition Score	Opposition Score	Opposition Score	Rank	Opposition Score	Opposition Score	Opposition Score	Opposition Score	Rank
Petr Koukal	Singles	Bonny (SUI); W 21–16, 21–14	Vural (TUR); W 21–13, 21–8	Bjelan (SRB); W 21–6, 21–13	1	Wraber (AUT); W 21–12, 21–16	Domke (GER); L 18–21, 21–18, 17–21	Did not advance		QF
Pavel Florián; Ondřej Kopřiva	Doubles	J. Magee/S. Magee (IRL); L 16–21, 7–21	Boe/Mogensen (DEN); L 5–21, 8–21	A. Silva/R. Silva (POR); W 21–15, 21–18	3	Did not advance				GS

Women

Athlete	Event	Group Stage				Round of 16	Quarterfinal	Semifinal	Final / BM	
Athlete	Event	Opposition Score	Opposition Score	Opposition Score	Rank	Opposition Score	Opposition Score	Opposition Score	Opposition Score	Rank
Kristína Gavnholt	Singles	Čižnárová (SVK); W 21–13, 21–11	Stanković (SLO); W 21–10, 21–12	Cicognini (ITA); W 21–10, 21–6	1	Tan (BEL); L 16–21, 18–21	Did not advance			R16
Kateřina Tomalová; Šárka Křížková	Doubles	Molina/Ojeda (ESP); L 9–21, 10–21	Bayrak/Yiğit (TUR); L 20–22, 8–21	Galenić/Poznanović (CRO); W 21–17, 21–14	3	Did not advance				GS

Mixed

Athlete	Event	Group Stage				Round of 16	Quarterfinal	Semifinal	Final / BM	
Athlete	Event	Opposition Score	Opposition Score	Opposition Score	Rank	Opposition Score	Opposition Score	Opposition Score	Opposition Score	Rank
Jakub Bitman; Alžběta Bášová	Doubles	Bartušis/Fomkinaite (LTU); W 21–8, 21–17	Cali/Sadowski (MLT); W 21–6, 21–6	S. Magee/Ch. Magee (IRL); L 11–21, 21–19, 14–21	2	Nøhr/Thygesen (DEN); L 21–23, 12–21	Did not advance			R16

== Cycling ==
- Women's time trial: Zuzana Neckářová – 27th

== Gymnastics ==
=== Aerobic ===
Czech Republic has qualified one athlete after the performance at the 2013 Aerobic Gymnastics European Championships.

- Groups – 1 team of 5 athletes

=== Artistic ===
- Women's – 3 quota places

=== Rhythmic ===
Czech Republic has qualified one athlete after the performance at the 2013 Rhythmic Gymnastics European Championships.

- Individual – 1 quota place

== Triathlon ==
- Men's – Tomáš Svoboda, František Kubínek, František Linduška
- Women's – Petra Kuříková, Jitka Šimáková
