= Croatia at the 2015 European Games =

- IOC code: CRO
- NOC: Croatian Olympic Committee
- Website: www.hoo.hr

in Baku, Azerbaijan 12 – 28 June 2015
- Competitors: 109 in 18 sports
- Flag bearer: Snježana Pejčić
- Medals Ranked 26th: Gold 1 Silver 4 Bronze 6 Total 11

European Games appearances (overview)
- 2015; 2019; 2023; 2027

Croatia participated at the 2015 European Games, in Baku, Azerbaijan from 12 to 28 June 2015.

== Medalists ==
Medal	Name	Sport	Event	Date
Gold	Maša Martinović	Karate	Women's +68 kg	13 June
Silver	Jelena Kovačević	Karate	Women's 55 kg	13 June
Silver	Ana Zaninović	Taekwondo	Women's 57 kg	17 June
Silver	Petar Gorša	Shooting	Men's 50 metre rifle three positions	21 June
Silver	Nikola Obravac	Swimming	Men's 50 metre breaststroke	25 June
Bronze	Ana Lenard	Karate	Women's 61 kg	13 June
Bronze	Dominik Etlinger	Wrestling	Men's Greco-Roman 71 kg	13 June
Bronze	Lucija Zaninović	Taekwondo	Women's 49 kg	16 June
Bronze	Iva Radoš	Taekwondo	Women's +67 kg	19 June
Bronze	Vedran Golec	Taekwondo	Men's +80 kg	19 June
Bronze	Josip Bepo Filipi	Boxing	Men's 91 kg	27 June

== Archery ==
Athlete	Event	Ranking round		Round of 64	Round of 32	Round of 16	Quarterfinals	Semifinals	Final / BM	
Athlete	Event	Score	Seed	Opposition Score	Opposition Score	Opposition Score	Opposition Score	Opposition Score	Opposition Score	Rank
Matija Mihalic	Men's individual	665	14	Matzkin (ISR); W 6–2	Ruban (UKR); L 1–7	Did not advance				17

== Badminton ==
Croatia has qualified 5 athletes.

Men

- Zvonimir Đurkinjak
- Zvonimir Hölbling

Women

- Katarina Galenić
- Staša Poznanović
- Dorotea Šutara

== Boxing ==
Croatia has qualified 5 athletes.

- Men's −60kg – Matteo Komadina
- Men's −64kg – Stipan Prtenjača
- Men's −75kg – Sanjin-Pol Vrgoč
- Men's −91kg – Marko Čalić
- Men's +91kg – Marin Mindoljević

== Canoeing ==
Croatia has qualified 2 athletes.

Men

- Antun Novaković

Women

- Brigita Bakić

== Cycling ==
Croatia has qualified 6 athletes.

=== Road ===
- Men's road race – Kristijan Đurasek, Robert Kišerlovski, Matija Kvasina
- Men's time trial – 1 quota place
- Women's road race – Mia Radotić

=== Mountain bike ===
- Men's cross-country – Filip Turk
- Women's cross-country – Andrea Kiršić

== Diving ==
Croatia has qualified 4 athletes.

Men

- Hrvoje Brezovac
- Juraj Melša

Women

- Maja Borić
- Lorena Tomiek

== Fencing ==
Croatia has qualified 1 athlete.

- Men's individual foil – Bojan Jovanović
- Women's individual foil – Marcela Dajčić

== Gymnastics ==
Croatia has earned following quota places.

=== Artistic ===
- Men's – Marijo Možnik
- Women's – Ana Đerek, Dina Madir, Ana Poščić

== Judo ==
Croatia has qualified 6 athletes.

Men

- Zlatko Kumrić
- Tomislav Marijanović

Women

- Andreja Đaković
- Ivana Maranić
- Barbara Matić
- Marijana Mišković

== Karate ==
Croatia has qualified 6 athletes.

- Men's −67kg – Danil Domdjoni
- Women's −50kg – Monika Berulec
- Women's −55kg – Jelena Kovačević
- Women's −61kg – Ana Lenard
- Women's +68kg – Maša Martinović
- Women's kata – Vlatka Kiuk

== Shooting ==
Croatia has qualified 12 athletes.

Men

- Bojan Đurković
- Anton Glasnović
- Josip Glasnović
- Petar Gorša
- Željko Posavec
- Saša Špirelja
- Ivica Štritof

Women

- Maša Berić
- Marija Marović
- Snježana Pejčić
- Tanja Perec
- Vlatka Pervan

== Swimming ==
Croatia has qualified 9 athletes.

Men

- Bruno Blašković
- Borna Jukić
- Kristian Komlenić
- Igor Kostovski
- Ante Lučev
- Nikola Miljenić
- Nikola Obrovac

Women

- Kristina Miletić
- Matea Sumajstorčić

== Table tennis ==
Croatia has qualified 5 athletes.

Men

- Andrej Gaćina
- Tomislav Kolarek
- Tan Ruiwu

Women

- Lea Rakovac
- Tian Yuan

== Taekwondo ==
Croatia has qualified 6 athletes.

- Men's −68kg – Filip Grgić
- Men's +80kg – Vedran Golec
- Women's −49kg – Lucija Zaninović
- Women's −57kg – Ana Zaninović
- Women's −67kg – Marina Sumić
- Women's +67kg – Iva Radoš

== Triathlon ==
Croatia has qualified 3 athletes.

- Men's – Matija Lukina, Matija Krivec
- Women's – Sonja Škevin

== Volleyball ==
Croatia has qualified 12 athletes.

- Women's indoor – 1 team of 14 athletes

== Water polo ==
Croatia has qualified 13 athletes.

- Men's indoor – 1 team of 13 athletes

== Wrestling ==
Croatia has qualified 6 athletes.

Men

- Dominik Etlinger
- Danijel Janečić
- Ivan Lizatović
- Božo Starčević
- Nenad Žugaj
- Neven Žugaj
