= Boxing at the European Games =

Karate competition

Boxing has been a European Games sport since the inaugural edition.

== Editions ==
| Games | Year | Events | Best Nation |
|---|---|---|---|
| I | 2015 | 15 | Azerbaijan |
| II | 2019 | 15 | Great Britain |
| III | 2023 | 13 | France |

== Venues ==
| Games | Venue | Other sports hosted at venue | Capacity | Ref. |
|---|---|---|---|---|
| 2015 Baku | Baku Crystal Hall | Fencing, karate, taekwondo, volleyball | 3,400 | |
| 2019 Minsk | Uruchie Sports Palace (Uručča, Minsk) | — | 3,000 | |
| 2023 Kraków-Małopolska | Nowy Targ Arena (Nowy Targ) | — | 3,000 | |
| 2027 Istanbul | | | | |

== Events ==
| Event | 15 | 19 | 23 | Years |
|---|---|---|---|---|
| Men's light flyweight | X | X | | 2 |
| Men's flyweight | X | X | X | 3 |
| Men's bantamweight | X | X | | 2 |
| Men's featherweight | X | X | X | 3 |
| Men's light welterweight | X | X | X | 3 |
| Men's welterweight | X | X | | 2 |
| Men's light middleweight | | | X | 1 |
| Men's middleweight | X | X | | 2 |
| Men's light heavyweight | X | X | X | 3 |
| Men's heavyweight | X | X | X | 3 |
| Men's super heavyweight | X | X | X | 3 |
| Men's total | 10 | 10 | 7 | |
| Women's light flyweight | | | X | 1 |
| Women's flyweight | X | X | | 2 |
| Women's bantamweight | X | | X | 2 |
| Women's featherweight | | X | X | 2 |
| Women's lightweight | X | X | X | 3 |
| Women's light welterweight | X | | | 1 |
| Women's welterweight | | X | X | 2 |
| Women's middleweight | X | X | X | 3 |
| Women's total | 5 | 5 | 6 | |
| Total | 15 | 15 | 13 | |

== Medal table ==
| Rank | Nation | Gold | Silver | Bronze | Total |
|---|---|---|---|---|---|
| 1 | Azerbaijan (AZE) | 7 | 2 | 6 | 15 |
| 2 | Russia (RUS) | 5 | 5 | 7 | 17 |
| 3 | Ireland (IRL) | 5 | 4 | 6 | 15 |
| 4 | Great Britain (GBR) | 5 | 1 | 10 | 16 |
| 5 | France (FRA) | 3 | 6 | 3 | 12 |
| 6 | Ukraine (UKR) | 3 | 2 | 5 | 10 |
| 7 | Bulgaria (BUL) | 3 | 2 | 2 | 7 |
| 8 | Turkey (TUR) | 3 | 1 | 5 | 9 |
| 9 | Armenia (ARM) | 2 | 0 | 2 | 4 |
| 10 | Italy (ITA) | 1 | 7 | 7 | 15 |
| 11 | Belarus (BLR) | 1 | 2 | 0 | 3 |
| 12 | Poland (POL) | 1 | 1 | 7 | 9 |
| 13 | Netherlands (NED) | 1 | 1 | 2 | 4 |
| 13 | Spain (ESP) | 1 | 1 | 2 | 4 |
| 15 | Denmark (DEN) | 1 | 0 | 0 | 1 |
| 15 | Finland (FIN) | 1 | 0 | 0 | 1 |
| 17 | Georgia (GEO) | 0 | 2 | 1 | 3 |
| 18 | Serbia (SRB) | 0 | 2 | 0 | 2 |
| 19 | Croatia (CRO) | 0 | 1 | 3 | 4 |
| 20 | Sweden (SWE) | 0 | 1 | 2 | 3 |
| 21 | Belgium (BEL) | 0 | 1 | 1 | 2 |
| 22 | Romania (ROU) | 0 | 1 | 0 | 1 |
| 23 | Germany (GER) | 0 | 0 | 10 | 10 |
| 24 | Hungary (HUN) | 0 | 0 | 3 | 3 |
| 25 | Slovakia (SVK) | 0 | 0 | 2 | 2 |
| Totals (25 entries) | | 43 | 43 | 86 | 172 |

== Medalists ==
=== Men's ===
==== Light flyweight ====
| Games | Gold | Silver | Bronze |
|---|---|---|---|
| 2015 Baku | Bator Sagaluev; Russia | Brendan Irvine; Ireland | Muhammed Ünlü; Turkey |
| 2015 Baku | Bator Sagaluev; Russia | Brendan Irvine; Ireland | Dmytro Zamotayev; Ukraine |
| 2019 Minsk | Arthur Hovhannisyan; Armenia | Sakhil Alakhverdovi; Georgia | Regan Buckley; Ireland |
| 2019 Minsk | Arthur Hovhannisyan; Armenia | Sakhil Alakhverdovi; Georgia | Federico Serra; Italy |

==== Flyweight ====
| Games | Gold | Silver | Bronze |
|---|---|---|---|
| 2015 Baku | Elvin Mamishzada; Azerbaijan | Vincenzo Picardi; Italy | Hamza Touba; Germany |
| 2015 Baku | Elvin Mamishzada; Azerbaijan | Vincenzo Picardi; Italy | Viliam Tankó; Slovakia |
| 2019 Minsk | Gabriel Escobar; Spain | Daniel Asenov; Bulgaria | Manuel Cappai; Italy |
| 2019 Minsk | Gabriel Escobar; Spain | Daniel Asenov; Bulgaria | Galal Yafai; Great Britain |
| 2023 Kraków–Nowy Targ | Billal Bennama; France | Samet Gümüş; Turkey | Kiaran MacDonald; Great Britain |
| 2023 Kraków–Nowy Targ | Billal Bennama; France | Samet Gümüş; Turkey | Federico Serra; Italy |

==== Bantamweight ====
| Games | Gold | Silver | Bronze |
|---|---|---|---|
| 2015 Baku | Bakhtovar Nazirov; Russia | Dzmitry Asanau; Belarus | Tayfur Aliyev; Azerbaijan |
| 2015 Baku | Bakhtovar Nazirov; Russia | Dzmitry Asanau; Belarus | Qais Ashfaq; Great Britain |
| 2019 Minsk | Kurt Walker; Ireland | Mykola Butsenko; Ukraine | Peter McGrail; Great Britain |
| 2019 Minsk | Kurt Walker; Ireland | Mykola Butsenko; Ukraine | Sharafa Raman; Germany |

==== Featherweight ====
| Games | Gold | Silver | Bronze |
|---|---|---|---|
| 2015 Baku | Albert Selimov; Azerbaijan | Sofiane Oumiha; France | Seán McComb; Ireland |
| 2015 Baku | Albert Selimov; Azerbaijan | Sofiane Oumiha; France | Mateusz Polski; Poland |
| 2019 Minsk | Dzmitry Asanau; Belarus | Gabil Mamedov; Russia | Karen Tonakanyan; Armenia |
| 2019 Minsk | Dzmitry Asanau; Belarus | Gabil Mamedov; Russia | Otar Eranosyan; Georgia |
| 2023 Kraków–Nowy Targ | Javier Ibáñez; Bulgaria | José Quiles; Spain | Nebil Ibrahim; Sweden |
| 2023 Kraków–Nowy Targ | Javier Ibáñez; Bulgaria | José Quiles; Spain | Vasile Usturoi; Belgium |

==== Light welterweight ====
| Games | Gold | Silver | Bronze |
|---|---|---|---|
| 2015 Baku | Lorenzo Sotomayor; Azerbaijan | Vincenzo Mangiacapre; Italy | Viktor Petrov; Ukraine |
| 2015 Baku | Lorenzo Sotomayor; Azerbaijan | Vincenzo Mangiacapre; Italy | Kastriot Sopa; Germany |
| 2019 Minsk | Hovhannes Bachkov; Armenia | Sofiane Oumiha; France | Enrico Lacruz; Netherlands |
| 2019 Minsk | Hovhannes Bachkov; Armenia | Sofiane Oumiha; France | Luke McCormack; Great Britain |
| 2023 Kraków–Nowy Targ | Sofiane Oumiha; France | Lasha Guruli; Georgia | Dean Clancy; Ireland |
| 2023 Kraków–Nowy Targ | Sofiane Oumiha; France | Lasha Guruli; Georgia | Richárd Kovács; Hungary |

==== Welterweight ====
| Games | Gold | Silver | Bronze |
|---|---|---|---|
| 2015 Baku | Parviz Baghirov; Azerbaijan | Alexander Besputin; Russia | Josh Kelly; Great Britain |
| 2015 Baku | Parviz Baghirov; Azerbaijan | Alexander Besputin; Russia | Yaroslav Samofalov; Ukraine |
| 2019 Minsk | Pat McCormack; Great Britain | Khariton Agrba; Russia | Lorenzo Sotomayor; Azerbaijan |
| 2019 Minsk | Pat McCormack; Great Britain | Khariton Agrba; Russia | Yevhenii Barabanov; Ukraine |

==== Light middleweight ====
| Games | Gold | Silver | Bronze |
|---|---|---|---|
| 2023 Kraków–Nowy Targ | Nikolai Terteryan; Denmark | Vahid Abasov; Serbia | Tuğrulhan Erdemir; Turkey |
| 2023 Kraków–Nowy Targ | Nikolai Terteryan; Denmark | Vahid Abasov; Serbia | Makan Traoré; France |

==== Middleweight ====
| Games | Gold | Silver | Bronze |
|---|---|---|---|
| 2015 Baku | Michael O'Reilly; Ireland | Xaybula Musalov; Azerbaijan | Maxim Koptyakov; Russia |
| 2015 Baku | Michael O'Reilly; Ireland | Xaybula Musalov; Azerbaijan | Zoltán Harcsa; Hungary |
| 2019 Minsk | Oleksandr Khyzhniak; Ukraine | cavalarro Italy | Andrej Csemez; Slovakia |
| 2019 Minsk | Oleksandr Khyzhniak; Ukraine | cavalarro Italy | Michael Nevin; Ireland |

==== Light heavyweight ====
| Games | Gold | Silver | Bronze |
|---|---|---|---|
| 2015 Baku | Teymur Mammadov; Azerbaijan | Valentino Manfredonia; Italy | Pavel Silyagin; Russia |
| 2015 Baku | Teymur Mammadov; Azerbaijan | Valentino Manfredonia; Italy | Oleksandr Khyzhniak; Ukraine |
| 2019 Minsk | Loren Alfonso; Azerbaijan | Benjamin Whittaker; Great Britain | Simone Fiori; Italy |
| 2019 Minsk | Loren Alfonso; Azerbaijan | Benjamin Whittaker; Great Britain | Gor Nersesyan; Armenia |
| 2023 Kraków–Nowy Targ | Oleksandr Khyzhniak; Ukraine | Gabrijel Veočić; Croatia | Salvatore Cavallaro; Italy |
| 2023 Kraków–Nowy Targ | Oleksandr Khyzhniak; Ukraine | Gabrijel Veočić; Croatia | Murad Allahverdiyev; Azerbaijan |

==== Heavyweight ====
| Games | Gold | Silver | Bronze |
|---|---|---|---|
| 2015 Baku | Abdulkadir Abdullayev; Azerbaijan | Gevorg Manukian; Ukraine | Sadam Magomedov; Russia |
| 2015 Baku | Abdulkadir Abdullayev; Azerbaijan | Gevorg Manukian; Ukraine | Josip Filipi; Croatia |
| 2019 Minsk | Muslim Gadzhimagomedov; Russia | Uladzislau Smiahlikau; Belarus | Toni Filipi; Croatia |
| 2019 Minsk | Muslim Gadzhimagomedov; Russia | Uladzislau Smiahlikau; Belarus | Cheavon Clarke; Great Britain |
| 2023 Kraków–Nowy Targ | Aziz Abbes Mouhiidine; Italy | Jack Marley; Ireland | Mateusz Bereźnicki; Poland |
| 2023 Kraków–Nowy Targ | Aziz Abbes Mouhiidine; Italy | Jack Marley; Ireland | Enmanuel Reyes; Spain |

==== Super heavyweight ====
| Games | Gold | Silver | Bronze |
|---|---|---|---|
| 2015 Baku | Joe Joyce; Great Britain | Gasan Gimbatov; Russia | Tony Yoka; France |
| 2015 Baku | Joe Joyce; Great Britain | Gasan Gimbatov; Russia | Mahammadrasul Majidov; Azerbaijan |
| 2019 Minsk | Victor Vykhryst; Ukraine | Mourad Aliev; France | Marko Milun; Croatia |
| 2019 Minsk | Victor Vykhryst; Ukraine | Mourad Aliev; France | Nelvie Tiafack; Germany |
| 2023 Kraków–Nowy Targ | Delicious Orie; Great Britain | Mahammad Abdullayev; Azerbaijan | Yordan Hernández; Bulgaria |
| 2023 Kraków–Nowy Targ | Delicious Orie; Great Britain | Mahammad Abdullayev; Azerbaijan | Nelvie Tiafack; Germany |

=== Women's ===
==== Light flyweight ====
| Games | Gold | Silver | Bronze |
|---|---|---|---|
| 2023 Kraków–Nowy Targ | Buse Naz Çakıroğlu; Turkey | Wassila Lkhadiri; France | Giordana Sorrentino; Italy |
| 2023 Kraków–Nowy Targ | Buse Naz Çakıroğlu; Turkey | Wassila Lkhadiri; France | Laura Fuertes; Spain |

==== Flyweight ====
| Games | Gold | Silver | Bronze |
|---|---|---|---|
| 2015 Baku | Nicola Adams; Great Britain | Sandra Drabik; Poland | Elif Coşkun; Turkey |
| 2015 Baku | Nicola Adams; Great Britain | Sandra Drabik; Poland | Saiana Sagataeva; Russia |
| 2019 Minsk | Buse Naz Çakıroğlu; Turkey | Svetlana Soluianova; Russia | Sandra Drabik; Poland |
| 2019 Minsk | Buse Naz Çakıroğlu; Turkey | Svetlana Soluianova; Russia | Gabriela Dimitrova; Bulgaria |

==== Bantamweight ====
| Games | Gold | Silver | Bronze |
|---|---|---|---|
| 2015 Baku | Elena Savelyeva; Russia | Marzia Davide; Italy | Anna Alimardanova; Azerbaijan |
| 2015 Baku | Elena Savelyeva; Russia | Marzia Davide; Italy | Azize Nimani; Germany |
| 2023 Kraków–Nowy Targ | Stanimira Petrova; Bulgaria | Lăcrămioara Perijoc; Romania | Charley Davison; Great Britain |
| 2023 Kraków–Nowy Targ | Stanimira Petrova; Bulgaria | Lăcrămioara Perijoc; Romania | Hatice Akbaş; Turkey |

==== Featherweight ====
| Games | Gold | Silver | Bronze |
|---|---|---|---|
| 2019 Minsk | Stanimira Petrova; Bulgaria | Michaela Walsh; Ireland | Jemyma Betrian; Netherlands |
| 2019 Minsk | Stanimira Petrova; Bulgaria | Michaela Walsh; Ireland | Daria Abramova; Russia |
| 2023 Kraków–Nowy Targ | Amina Zidani; France | Svetlana Staneva; Bulgaria | Michaela Walsh; Ireland |
| 2023 Kraków–Nowy Targ | Amina Zidani; France | Svetlana Staneva; Bulgaria | Irma Testa; Italy |

==== Lightweight ====
| Games | Gold | Silver | Bronze |
|---|---|---|---|
| 2015 Baku | Katie Taylor; Ireland | Estelle Mossely; France | Yana Alekseevna; Azerbaijan |
| 2015 Baku | Katie Taylor; Ireland | Estelle Mossely; France | Tasheena Bugar; Germany |
| 2019 Minsk | Mira Potkonen; Finland | Kellie Harrington; Ireland | Anastasia Belyakova; Russia |
| 2019 Minsk | Mira Potkonen; Finland | Kellie Harrington; Ireland | Agnes Alexiusson; Sweden |
| 2023 Kraków–Nowy Targ | Kellie Harrington; Ireland | Natalia Shadrina; Serbia | Estelle Mossely; France |
| 2023 Kraków–Nowy Targ | Kellie Harrington; Ireland | Natalia Shadrina; Serbia | Gizem Özer; Turkey |

==== Light welterweight ====
| Games | Gold | Silver | Bronze |
|---|---|---|---|
| 2015 Baku | Elena Savelyeva; Russia | Valentina Alberti; Italy | Sandy Ryan; Great Britain |
| 2015 Baku | Elena Savelyeva; Russia | Valentina Alberti; Italy | Aneta Rygielska; Poland |

==== Welterweight ====
| Games | Gold | Silver | Bronze |
|---|---|---|---|
| 2019 Minsk | Karolina Koszewska; Poland | Assunta Canfora; Italy | Gráinne Walsh; Ireland |
| 2019 Minsk | Karolina Koszewska; Poland | Assunta Canfora; Italy | Nadine Apetz; Germany |
| 2023 Kraków–Nowy Targ | Busenaz Sürmeneli; Turkey | Oshin Derieuw; Belgium | Rosie Eccles; Great Britain |
| 2023 Kraków–Nowy Targ | Busenaz Sürmeneli; Turkey | Oshin Derieuw; Belgium | Luca Anna Hámori; Hungary |

==== Middleweight ====
| Games | Gold | Silver | Bronze |
|---|---|---|---|
| 2015 Baku | Nouchka Fontijn; Netherlands | Anna Laurell Nash; Sweden | Sarah Scheurich; Germany |
| 2015 Baku | Nouchka Fontijn; Netherlands | Anna Laurell Nash; Sweden | Lidia Fidura; Poland |
| 2019 Minsk | Lauren Price; Great Britain | Nouchka Fontijn; Netherlands | Darima Sandakova; Russia |
| 2019 Minsk | Lauren Price; Great Britain | Nouchka Fontijn; Netherlands | Elżbieta Wójcik; Poland |
| 2023 Kraków–Nowy Targ | Aoife O'Rourke; Ireland | Davina Michel; France | Elżbieta Wójcik; Poland |
| 2023 Kraków–Nowy Targ | Aoife O'Rourke; Ireland | Davina Michel; France | Irina Schönberger; Germany |

== Participating nations ==
Andorra, Iceland, Liechtenstein, Malta, and San Marino have yet to qualify for boxing at the Games.

| Nation | 15 | 19 | 23 | Years |
|---|---|---|---|---|
| Albania (ALB) | 2 | 4 | 4 | 3 |
| Armenia (ARM) | 6 | 11 | 13 | 3 |
| Austria (AUT) | 1 | 5 | 2 | 3 |
| Azerbaijan (AZE) | 15 | 11 | 12 | 3 |
| Belarus (BLR) | 11 | 15 | | 2 |
| Belgium (BEL) | 2 | 6 | 3 | 3 |
| Bosnia and Herzegovina (BIH) | 4 | 7 | 10 | 3 |
| Bulgaria (BUL) | 12 | 13 | 10 | 3 |
| Croatia (CRO) | 4 | 7 | 8 | 3 |
| Cyprus (CYP) | | 1 | 2 | 2 |
| Czech Republic (CZE) | 4 | 6 | 12 | 3 |
| Denmark (DEN) | 4 | 2 | 5 | 3 |
| Refugee Olympic Team (EOR) | | | 2 | 1 |
| Estonia (EST) | 3 | 6 | 5 | 3 |
| Finland (FIN) | 4 | 5 | 5 | 3 |
| France (FRA) | 12 | 10 | 13 | 3 |
| Georgia (GEO) | 9 | 10 | 8 | 3 |
| Germany (GER) | 15 | 13 | 12 | 3 |
| Great Britain (GBR) | 12 | 12 | 13 | 3 |
| Greece (GRE) | 2 | 3 | 8 | 3 |
| Hungary (HUN) | 14 | 12 | 11 | 3 |
| Ireland (IRL) | 12 | 11 | 12 | 3 |
| Israel (ISR) | 4 | 3 | 5 | 3 |
| Italy (ITA) | 13 | 13 | 13 | 3 |
| Kosovo (KOS) | 2 | 4 | 7 | 3 |
| Latvia (LAT) | 5 | 2 | 5 | 3 |
| Lithuania (LTU) | 4 | 3 | 8 | 3 |
| Luxembourg (LUX) | | 1 | 1 | 2 |
| Moldova (MDA) | 11 | 9 | 9 | 3 |
| Monaco (MON) | | 1 | | 1 |
| Montenegro (MNE) | 2 | 1 | 3 | 3 |
| Netherlands (NED) | 2 | 6 | 5 | 3 |
| North Macedonia (MKD) | | 3 | 3 | 2 |
| Norway (NOR) | 2 | 4 | 6 | 3 |
| Poland (POL) | 11 | 13 | 13 | 3 |
| Portugal (POR) | | | 2 | 1 |
| Romania (ROM) | 10 | 10 | 6 | 3 |
| Russia (RUS) | 15 | 15 | | 2 |
| Serbia (SRB) | 2 | 10 | 11 | 3 |
| Slovakia (SVK) | 4 | 6 | 6 | 3 |
| Slovenia (SLO) | 3 | 3 | 3 | 3 |
| Spain (ESP) | 6 | 8 | 11 | 3 |
| Sweden (SWE) | 6 | 4 | 4 | 3 |
| Switzerland (SUI) | 3 | 4 | 2 | 3 |
| Turkey (TUR) | 13 | 11 | 13 | 3 |
| Ukraine (UKR) | 12 | 13 | 13 | 3 |
| Total countries | 40 | 44 | 43 | 45 |
| Total athletes | 278 | 317 | 319 | |
| Year | 15 | 19 | 23 | |
