= Archery at the European Games =

Sport

Archery has been a European Games sport since the inaugural edition. Originally restricted to the five Olympic archery events using the recurve bow, three events in compound bow were introduced in 2019.

== Editions ==
Games	Year	Events	Best Nation
I	2015	5	Italy
II	2019	8	Italy
III	2023	8	Italy

== Venues ==
Games	Venue	Other sports hosted at venue	Capacity	Notes
2015 Baku	Tofiq Bahramov Stadium	–	31,200	
2019 Minsk	Olympic Sports Complex (Minsk)	Beach soccer	1,500	New arena
2023 Kraków-Małopolska	Płaszowianka Archery Park (Kraków)	–	500	

== Events ==
Event	15	19	23	Years
Recurve
Men's individual	X	X	X	3
Men's team	X	X	X	3
Women's individual	X	X	X	3
Women's team	X	X	X	3
Mixed team	X	X	X	3
Compound
Men's individual		X	X	2
Women's individual		X	X	2
Mixed team		X	X	2
Total	5	8	8	

== Medal table ==
Rank	Nation	Gold	Silver	Bronze	Total
1	Italy (ITA)	7	2	4	13
2	Great Britain (GBR)	3	2	0	5
3	Spain (ESP)	2	4	3	9
4	Germany (GER)	2	0	2	4
5	Netherlands (NED)	1	4	2	7
6	Ukraine (UKR)	1	1	2	4
7	France (FRA)	1	1	1	3
8	Russia (RUS)	1	1	0	2
9	Estonia (EST)	1	0	0	1
9	Slovakia (SVK)	1	0	0	1
9	Slovenia (SLO)	1	0	0	1
12	Belarus (BLR)	0	2	1	3
12	Denmark (DEN)	0	2	1	3
14	Georgia (GEO)	0	1	0	1
14	Luxembourg (LUX)	0	1	0	1
16	Turkey (TUR)	0	0	3	3
17	Croatia (CRO)	0	0	1	1
17	Switzerland (SUI)	0	0	1	1
Totals (18 entries)		21	21	21	63

== Medallists ==
=== Recurve ===
==== Men's individual ====
Games	Gold	Silver	Bronze
2015 Baku	Miguel Alvariño; Spain	Sjef van den Berg; Netherlands	Anton Prilepov; Belarus
2019 Minsk	Mauro Nespoli; Italy	Steve Wijler; Netherlands	Pablo Acha; Spain
2023 Kraków-Małopolska	Florian Unruh; Germany	Miguel Alvariño; Spain	Pablo Acha; Spain

==== Men's team ====
Games	Gold	Silver	Bronze
2015 Baku	Ukraine; Heorhiy Ivanytskyy; Markiyan Ivashko; Viktor Ruban	Spain; Miguel Alvariño; Juan Ignacio Rodríguez; Antonio Fernández	Netherlands; Rick van der Ven; Sjef van den Berg; Mitch Dielemans
2019 Minsk	France; Thomas Chirault; Pierre Plihon; Jean-Charles Valladont	Netherlands; Sjef van den Berg; Jan van Tongeren; Steve Wijler	Italy; Marco Galiazzo; Mauro Nespoli; David Pasqualucci
2023 Kraków-Małopolska	Italy; Federico Musolesi; Mauro Nespoli; Alessandro Paoli	Spain; Pablo Acha; Miguel Alvariño; Andrés Temiño	Switzerland; Keziah Chabin; Florian Faber; Thomas Rufer

==== Women's individual ====
Games	Gold	Silver	Bronze
2015 Baku	Karina Winter; Germany	Maja Jager; Denmark	Alicia Marín; Spain
2019 Minsk	Tatiana Andreoli; Italy	Lucilla Boari; Italy	Gabriela Bayardo; Netherlands
2023 Kraków-Małopolska	Penny Healey; Great Britain	Elia Canales; Spain	Chiara Rebagliati; Italy

==== Women's team ====
Games	Gold	Silver	Bronze
2015 Baku	Italy; Natalia Valeeva; Guendalina Sartori; Elena Tonetta	Belarus; Hanna Marusava; Ekaterina Timofeyeva; Alena Tolkach	Ukraine; Lidiia Sichenikova; Veronika Marchenko; Anastasia Pavlova
2019 Minsk	Great Britain; Sarah Bettles; Naomi Folkard; Bryony Pitman	Belarus; Karyna Dziominskaya; Karyna Kazlouskaya; Hanna Marusava	Denmark; Randi Degn; Maja Jager; Anne Marie Laursen
2023 Kraków-Małopolska	Great Britain; Penny Healey; Bryony Pitman; Jaspreet Sagoo	France; Audrey Adiceom; Lisa Barbelin; Caroline Lopez	Italy; Tatiana Andreoli; Lucilla Boari; Chiara Rebagliati

==== Mixed team ====
Games	Gold	Silver	Bronze
2015 Baku	Italy; Natalia Valeeva; Mauro Nespoli	Georgia; Khatuna Narimanidze; Lasha Pkhakadze	Ukraine; Lidiia Sichenikova; Heorhiy Ivanytskyy
2019 Minsk	Italy; Lucilla Boari; Mauro Nespoli	Great Britain; Naomi Folkard; Patrick Huston	Germany; Michelle Kroppen; Cedric Rieger
2023 Kraków-Małopolska	Spain; Elia Canales; Miguel Alvariño	Ukraine; Anastasia Pavlova; Ivan Kozhokar	Germany; Michelle Kroppen; Florian Unruh

=== Compound ===
==== Men's individual ====
Games	Gold	Silver	Bronze
2019 Minsk	Mike Schloesser; Netherlands	Gilles Seywert; Luxembourg	Mario Vavro; Croatia
2023 Kraków-Małopolska	Jozef Bošanský; Slovakia	Marco Bruno; Italy	Emircan Haney; Turkey

==== Women's individual ====
Games	Gold	Silver	Bronze
2019 Minsk	Toja Ellison; Slovenia	Natalia Avdeeva; Russia	Sophie Dodemont; France
2023 Kraków-Małopolska	Elisa Roner; Italy	Ella Gibson; Great Britain	Hazal Burun; Turkey

==== Mixed team ====
Games	Gold	Silver	Bronze
2019 Minsk	Russia; Natalia Avdeeva; Anton Bulaev	Netherlands; Sanne de Laat; Mike Schloesser	Turkey; Yeşim Bostan; Evren Çağıran
2023 Kraków-Małopolska	Estonia; Lisell Jäätma; Robin Jäätma	Denmark; Tanja Gellenthien; Mathias Fullerton	Italy; Elisa Roner; Marco Bruno

== Participating nations ==
Nation	15	19	23	Years
Albania		1		1
Austria	2	2	2	3
Azerbaijan	6	1	1	3
Belgium	1	3	3	3
Belarus	6	8		2
Bulgaria	2	2	2	3
Croatia	1	4	1	3
Cyprus	2	3	2	3
Czech Republic		2	2	2
Denmark	4	4	6	3
Estonia	2	3	3	3
Finland	2	3	3	3
France	6	6	8	3
Georgia	4	2	1	3
Germany	6	6	6	3
Great Britain	4	8	7	3
Greece	4	2	3	3
Hungary		1	2	2
Iceland	1	1	1	3
Ireland	2	1	2	3
Israel	1	1	3	3
Italy	6	8	8	3
Kosovo	2	1	1	3
Latvia	2	1	2	3
Liechtenstein	1			1
Lithuania	1	1	2	3
Luxembourg	1	4	2	3
Moldova	2	2	2	3
Montenegro		1		1
Netherlands	6	6	6	3
Norway	4			1
Poland	6	3	8	3
Portugal		1	1	2
Romania	2	1	2	3
Russia	6	8		2
San Marino	1	1		2
Serbia	1	1		2
Slovakia	2	2	3	3
Slovenia	4	3	5	3
Spain	6	5	6	3
Sweden	1	3	3	3
Switzerland	4	2	4	3
Turkey	6	6	6	3
Ukraine	6	4	5	3
No. of nations	39	42	36	
No. of archers	126	128	124	
Year	15	19	23	
