= Karate at the European Games =

Karate competition

Karate has been a European Games sport since the inaugural edition.

== Editions ==
Games	Year	Events	Best Nation
I	2015	12	Azerbaijan
II	2019	12	Spain
III	2023	12	Ukraine

== Venues ==
Games	Venue	Other sports hosted at venue	Capacity	Ref.
2015 Baku	Crystal Hall	Fencing, taekwondo	2,000	
2019 Minsk	Chizhovka-Arena	Judo	8,800	
2023 Kraków-Małopolska	Dębowiec Sports Arena (Bielsko-Biała)	–	4,500	
2027 Istanbul				

== Events ==
Event	15	19	23	Years
Men's individual kata	X	X	X	3
Men's kumite 60 kg	X	X	X	3
Men's kumite 67 kg	X	X	X	3
Men's kumite 75 kg	X	X	X	3
Men's kumite 84 kg	X	X	X	3
Men's kumite +84 kg	X	X	X	3
Women's individual kata	X	X	X	3
Women's kumite 50 kg	X	X	X	3
Women's kumite 55 kg	X	X	X	3
Women's kumite 61 kg	X	X	X	3
Women's kumite 68 kg	X	X	X	3
Women's kumite +68 kg	X	X	X	3

== Medal table ==
Rank	Nation	Gold	Silver	Bronze	Total
1	Azerbaijan (AZE)	7	3	4	14
2	Spain (ESP)	7	0	1	8
3	Turkey (TUR)	4	7	10	21
4	Ukraine (UKR)	4	2	3	9
5	Croatia (CRO)	3	2	1	6
6	Italy (ITA)	2	7	7	16
7	France (FRA)	2	3	4	9
8	Austria (AUT)	2	2	0	4
9	Germany (GER)	2	1	2	5
10	Bulgaria (BUL)	1	1	0	2
11	Albania (ALB)	1	0	0	1
11	Latvia (LAT)	1	0	0	1
13	Greece (GRE)	0	3	3	6
14	Switzerland (SUI)	0	1	2	3
15	Montenegro (MNE)	0	1	1	2
16	Netherlands (NED)	0	1	0	1
16	Slovenia (SLO)	0	1	0	1
18	Belarus (BLR)	0	0	2	2
18	Georgia (GEO)	0	0	2	2
18	Hungary (HUN)	0	0	2	2
18	Luxembourg (LUX)	0	0	2	2
18	North Macedonia (MKD)	0	0	2	2
18	Poland (POL)	0	0	2	2
18	Portugal (POR)	0	0	2	2
18	Russia (RUS)	0	0	2	2
26	Armenia (ARM)	0	0	1	1
26	Belgium (BEL)	0	0	1	1
26	Cyprus (CYP)	0	0	1	1
26	Estonia (EST)	0	0	1	1
26	Finland (FIN)	0	0	1	1
26	Romania (ROU)	0	0	1	1
Totals (31 entries)		36	35	60	131

== Medalists ==
=== Men's ===
==== Individual kata ====
Games	Gold	Silver	Bronze
2015 Baku	Damián Quintero; Spain	Mattia Busato; Italy	Mehmet Yakan; Turkey
2019 Minsk	Damián Quintero; Spain	Ali Sofuoğlu; Turkey	Roman Heydarov; Azerbaijan
2019 Minsk	Damián Quintero; Spain	Ali Sofuoğlu; Turkey	Mattia Busato; Italy
2023 Kraków-Małopolska	Damián Quintero; Spain	Ali Sofuoğlu; Turkey	Yuki Ujihara; Switzerland
2023 Kraków-Małopolska	Damián Quintero; Spain	Ali Sofuoğlu; Turkey	Mattia Busato; Italy

==== Kumite 60 kg ====
Games	Gold	Silver	Bronze
2015 Baku	Firdovsi Farzaliyev; Azerbaijan	Luca Maresca; Italy	Emil Pavlov; Macedonia
2019 Minsk	Kalvis Kalniņš; Latvia	Firdovsi Farzaliyev; Azerbaijan	Angelo Crescenzo; Italy
2019 Minsk	Kalvis Kalniņš; Latvia	Firdovsi Farzaliyev; Azerbaijan	Evgeny Plakhutin; Russia
2023 Kraków-Małopolska	Eray Şamdan; Turkey	Christos-Stefanos Xenos; Greece	Angelo Crescenzo; Italy
2023 Kraków-Małopolska	Eray Şamdan; Turkey	Christos-Stefanos Xenos; Greece	Nikita Filipov; Ukraine

==== Kumite 67 kg ====
Games	Gold	Silver	Bronze
2015 Baku	Burak Uygur; Turkey	Steven Da Costa; France	Niyazi Aliyev; Azerbaijan
2019 Minsk	Luca Maresca; Italy	Mario Hodžić; Montenegro	Artsiom Krautsou; Belarus
2019 Minsk	Luca Maresca; Italy	Mario Hodžić; Montenegro	Yves Martial Tadissi; Hungary
2023 Kraków-Małopolska	Tural Aghalarzade; Azerbaijan	Dionysios Xenos; Greece	Ştefan Comănescu; Romania
2023 Kraków-Małopolska	Tural Aghalarzade; Azerbaijan	Dionysios Xenos; Greece	Miłosz Sabiecki; Poland

==== Kumite 75 kg ====
Games	Gold	Silver	Bronze
2015 Baku	Rafael Aghayev; Azerbaijan	Luigi Busà; Italy	Erman Eltemur; Turkey
2019 Minsk	Stanislav Horuna; Ukraine	Rafael Aghayev; Azerbaijan	Pavel Artamonov; Estonia
2019 Minsk	Stanislav Horuna; Ukraine	Rafael Aghayev; Azerbaijan	Gábor Hárspataki; Hungary
2023 Kraków-Małopolska	Andrii Zaplitnyi; Ukraine	Daniele De Vivo; Italy	Erman Eltemur; Turkey
2023 Kraków-Małopolska	Andrii Zaplitnyi; Ukraine	Daniele De Vivo; Italy	Quentin Mahauden; Belgium

==== Kumite 84 kg ====
Games	Gold	Silver	Bronze
2015 Baku	Aykhan Mamayev; Azerbaijan	Michail Georgos Tzanos; Greece	Uğur Aktaş; Turkey
2019 Minsk	Ivan Kvesić; Croatia	Uğur Aktaş; Turkey	Michele Martina; Italy
2019 Minsk	Ivan Kvesić; Croatia	Uğur Aktaş; Turkey	Valerii Chobotar; Ukraine
2023 Kraków-Małopolska	Alvin Karaqi; Albania	Brian Timmermans; Netherlands	Michał Bąbos; Poland
2023 Kraków-Małopolska	Alvin Karaqi; Albania	Brian Timmermans; Netherlands	Michele Martina; Italy

==== Kumite +84 kg ====
Games	Gold	Silver	Bronze
2015 Baku	Enes Erkan; Turkey	Jonathan Horne; Germany	Martin Nestorovski; Macedonia
2019 Minsk	Asiman Gurbanli; Azerbaijan	Anđelo Kvesić; Croatia	Gogita Arkania; Georgia
2019 Minsk	Asiman Gurbanli; Azerbaijan	Anđelo Kvesić; Croatia	Jonathan Horne; Germany
2023 Kraków-Małopolska	Anđelo Kvesić; Croatia	Not awarded^{[a]}	Asiman Gurbanli; Azerbaijan
2023 Kraków-Małopolska	Anđelo Kvesić; Croatia	Not awarded^{[a]}	Gogita Arkania; Georgia

- ^{Note} Fatih Şen of Turkey was disqualified due to unsportsmanlike behavior by shikkaku.

=== Women's ===
==== Individual kata ====
Games	Gold	Silver	Bronze
2015 Baku	Sandra Sánchez; Spain	Sandy Scordo; France	Dilara Bozan; Turkey
2019 Minsk	Sandra Sánchez; Spain	Viviana Bottaro; Italy	Patrícia Esparteiro; Portugal
2019 Minsk	Sandra Sánchez; Spain	Viviana Bottaro; Italy	Dilara Bozan; Turkey
2023 Kraków-Małopolska	Paola García; Spain	Helvétia Taily; France	Georgina Xenou; Greece
2023 Kraków-Małopolska	Paola García; Spain	Helvétia Taily; France	Ana Cruz; Portugal

==== Kumite 50 kg ====
Games	Gold	Silver	Bronze
2015 Baku	Serap Özçelik; Turkey	Bettina Plank; Austria	Alexandra Recchia; France
2019 Minsk	Bettina Plank; Austria	Serap Özçelik; Turkey	Mariya Koulinkovitch; Belarus
2019 Minsk	Bettina Plank; Austria	Serap Özçelik; Turkey	Sophia Bouderbane; France
2023 Kraków-Małopolska	Bettina Plank; Austria	Erminia Perfetto; Italy	Irene Kontou; Cyprus
2023 Kraków-Małopolska	Bettina Plank; Austria	Erminia Perfetto; Italy	Serap Özçelik Arapoğlu; Turkey

==== Kumite 55 kg ====
Games	Gold	Silver	Bronze
2015 Baku	Emily Thouy; France	Jelena Kovačević; Croatia	Ilaha Qasimova; Azerbaijan
2019 Minsk	Ivet Goranova; Bulgaria	Anzhelika Terliuga; Ukraine	Jana Bitsch; Germany
2019 Minsk	Ivet Goranova; Bulgaria	Anzhelika Terliuga; Ukraine	Jennifer Warling; Luxembourg
2023 Kraków-Małopolska	Anzhelika Terliuga; Ukraine	Ivet Goranova; Bulgaria	Jennifer Warling; Luxembourg
2023 Kraków-Małopolska	Anzhelika Terliuga; Ukraine	Ivet Goranova; Bulgaria	Tuba Yakan; Turkey

==== Kumite 61 kg ====
Games	Gold	Silver	Bronze
2015 Baku	Lucie Ignace; France	Merve Çoban; Turkey	Ana Lenard; Croatia
2019 Minsk	Anita Serogina; Ukraine	Tjaša Ristić; Slovenia	Gwendoline Philippe; France
2019 Minsk	Anita Serogina; Ukraine	Tjaša Ristić; Slovenia	Merve Çoban; Turkey
2023 Kraków-Małopolska	Reem Khamis; Germany	Anita Serogina; Ukraine	Alessandra Mangiacapra; Italy
2023 Kraków-Małopolska	Reem Khamis; Germany	Anita Serogina; Ukraine	Gülbahar Gözütok; Turkey

==== Kumite 68 kg ====
Games	Gold	Silver	Bronze
2015 Baku	Irina Zaretska; Azerbaijan	Alisa Buchinger; Austria	Marina Raković; Montenegro
2019 Minsk	Silvia Semeraro; Italy	Irina Zaretska; Azerbaijan	Elena Quirici; Switzerland
2019 Minsk	Silvia Semeraro; Italy	Irina Zaretska; Azerbaijan	Halyna Melnyk; Ukraine
2023 Kraków-Małopolska	Irina Zaretska; Azerbaijan	Elena Quirici; Switzerland	Anita Makyan; Armenia
2023 Kraków-Małopolska	Irina Zaretska; Azerbaijan	Elena Quirici; Switzerland	Alizée Agier; France

==== Kumite +68 kg ====
Games	Gold	Silver	Bronze
2015 Baku	Maša Martinović; Croatia	Meltem Hocaoğlu; Turkey	Ivanna Zaytseva; Russia
2019 Minsk	Laura Palacio; Spain	Meltem Hocaoğlu; Turkey	Titta Keinänen; Finland
2019 Minsk	Laura Palacio; Spain	Meltem Hocaoğlu; Turkey	Eleni Chatziliadou; Greece
2023 Kraków-Małopolska	Johanna Kneer; Germany	Clio Ferracuti; Italy	Kyriaki Kydonaki; Greece
2023 Kraków-Małopolska	Johanna Kneer; Germany	Clio Ferracuti; Italy	María Torres; Spain

== Participating nations ==
Liechtenstein, Lithuania, Malta, Moldova, Monaco and San Marino have yet to qualify for the competition in karate.

Nation	15	19	23	Years
Andorra (AND)		1		1
Albania (ALB)	1		1	2
Armenia (ARM)			1	1
Austria (AUT)	2	2	1	3
Azerbaijan (AZE)	12	7	8	3
Belarus (BLR)	1	12		2
Belgium (BEL)	1	1	1	3
Bosnia and Herzegovina (BIH)			1	1
Bulgaria (BUL)	1	1	1	3
Croatia (CRO)	6	2	3	3
Cyprus (CYP)	1		1	2
Czech Republic (CZE)	1	1	1	3
Denmark (DEN)	1	1	1	3
Estonia (EST)		1		1
Finland (FIN)	2	1	1	3
France (FRA)	10	7	3	3
Georgia (GEO)	1	1	2	3
Germany (GER)	5	6	5	3
Great Britain (GBR)		2	1	2
Greece (GRE)	3	1	6	3
Hungary (HUN)	1	2	2	3
Iceland (ISL)	1			1
Ireland (IRL)	1			1
Israel (ISR)			1	1
Italy (ITA)	4	6	9	3
Kosovo (KOS)	1	2		2
Latvia (LAT)	1	1		2
Luxembourg (LUX)	1	1	1	3
Montenegro (MNE)	1	2	1	3
Netherlands (NED)	1	1	2	3
North Macedonia (MKD)	2	1	1	3
Norway (NOR)	1	1		2
Poland (POL)	1	1	12	3
Portugal (POR)	1	1	2	3
Romania (ROM)	1	1	1	3
Russia (RUS)	2	1		2
Serbia (SRB)	3	3		2
Slovakia (SVK)	1	1	1	3
Slovenia (SLO)	1	1		2
Spain (ESP)	7	4	5	3
Sweden (SWE)	1	1	1	3
Switzerland (SUI)	1	1	3	3
Turkey (TUR)	11	11	9	3
Ukraine (UKR)	3	6	7	3
Total countries	38	37	33	44
Total athletes	96	96	96	
Year	15	19	23	
