= Muaythai at the European Games =

- Governing body: EMF
- Events: 10 (men: 5; women: 5)

Games
- 2015; 2019; 2023

Muaythai (Note: Muaythai is the official name of Muay Thai, recognized by the European Olympic Committees and the International Olympic Committee.) was featured in the European Games official programme for the first time at the 2023 European Games in Małopolska, Poland.

The European Muaythai Federation is governing body for muaythai at the European Games.

== Summary ==
Games	Year	Events	Best Nation
3	2023	10	Ukraine

== Events ==
The muaythai competition is organized as a set of tournaments, one for each weight class. The number of weight classes has currently 5 for men and 5 for women, as shown in the following table. Weights were measured in kilograms.

Men's weight classes
2023–onward
Heavyweight
(81–91 kg)
Light heavyweight
(71–81 kg)
Light middleweight
(67–71 kg)
Welterweight
(60–67 kg)
Lightweight
(–60 kg)
5

Women's weight classes
2023–onward
Light welterweight
(60–63.5 kg)
Lightweight
(57–60 kg)
Featherweight
(54–57 kg)
Bantamweight
(51–54 kg)
Flyweight
(–51 kg)
5

== Medal table ==
The numbers below are after the 2023 European Games in Myślenice, Małopolska, Poland.

Rank	Nation	Gold	Silver	Bronze	Total
1	Ukraine	3	1	2	6
2	Turkey	2	2	2	6
3	Poland	1	2	2	5
4	Belgium	1	1	1	3
5	Sweden	1	0	1	2
6	Estonia	1	0	0	1
6	Moldova	1	0	0	1
8	Portugal	0	2	0	2
9	Czech Republic	0	1	2	3
10	Italy	0	1	0	1
11	Azerbaijan	0	0	3	3
12	Finland	0	0	2	2
12	France	0	0	2	2
14	Armenia	0	0	1	1
14	Georgia	0	0	1	1
14	Greece	0	0	1	1
Totals (16 entries)		10	10	20	40

== Number of Muay Thai practitioners by nation ==
The number in each box represents the number of Muay Thai practitioners the nation sent.

Nation	15	19	23	Years
Armenia			4	1
Austria			1	1
Azerbaijan			4	1
Belgium			3	1
Croatia			3	1
Czech Republic			6	1
Denmark			1	1
Estonia			1	1
Finland			2	1
France			5	1
Georgia			3	1
Germany			2	1
Greece			3	1
Hungary			1	1
Italy			5	1
Moldova			1	1
Poland			10	1
Portugal			4	1
Slovenia			2	1
Spain			4	1
Sweden			3	1
Turkey			6	1
Ukraine			6	1
Nations	–	–	23	
Athletes	–	–	80	
Year	15	19	23	
