= North Macedonia at the European Games =

- IOC code: MKD
- NOC: Olympic Committee of North Macedonia
- Website: www.mok.org.mk
- Medals: Gold 0 Silver 1 Bronze 2 Total 3

European Games appearances (overview)
- 2015; 2019; 2023; 2027

North Macedonia, officially designated as the former Yugoslav Republic of Macedonia, participated at the inaugural edition of the European Games in 2015.

== Medal tables ==
=== Medals by Games ===
Games	Athletes	Gold	Silver	Bronze	Total	Rank
(Azerbaijan) 2015 Baku	54	0	0	2	2	38
(Belarus) 2019 Minsk	12	0	0	0	0	–
(Poland) 2023 Krakow	38	0	1	0	1	38
(Turkey) 2027 Istanbul	Future event					
Total		0	1	2	3	43

=== Medals by sports ===
Sport	Gold	Silver	Bronze	Total
Taekwondo	0	1	0	1
Karate	0	0	2	2
Totals (2 entries)	0	1	2	3

== List of medallists ==
Medal	Name(s)	Games	Sport	Event
Bronze	Emil Pavlov	(Azerbaijan) 2015 Baku	Karate	Men's 60kg
Bronze	Martin Nestorovski	(Azerbaijan) 2015 Baku	Karate	Men's 84+ kg
Silver	Dejan Georgievski	(Poland) 2023 Krakow	Taekwondo	Men's +87 kg

== See also ==
- North Macedonia at the Olympics
