= Sport climbing at the 2027 European Games =

Sport climbing events at the 2027 European Games

- Venue: Haydarpaşa railway station, Istanbul
- Dates: 24–27 June 2027
- Competitors: 160 from 23 nations

Sport climbing at the 2027 European Games in Istanbul, Turkey, will be held from 24 to 27 June 2027 at a temporary venue located at Haydarpaşa railway station. A total of six medal events will be contested, comprising men's and women's competitions in boulder, lead, and speed.

The competition serves as a direct continental qualification event for sport climbing at the 2028 Summer Olympics in Los Angeles, with one Olympic quota place per event per gender awarded to the highest-placed eligible athlete.

== Schedule ==
Competition is scheduled to take place over four days from 24 to 27 June 2027.

== Medalists ==
=== Summary ===
Event	Gold	Silver	Bronze
Men's boulder			
Women's boulder			
Men's lead			
Women's lead			
Men's speed			
Women's speed			

=== Medal table ===
* Host nation (Turkey)

Rank	Nation	Gold	Silver	Bronze	Total
1	Turkey*	0	0	0	0
Totals (1 entries)		0	0	0	0

== Qualification ==
=== Qualification summary ===
A total of 160 athletes (80 men and 80 women) will qualify for sport climbing at the 2027 European Games in Istanbul. Quotas are allocated to National Olympic Committees (NOCs) with a maximum of three athletes per event per gender (up to nine per gender overall), requiring athletes to be born by 1 January 2011 and hold a valid World Climbing license.

=== Qualification pathway ===
Qualification concludes on 31 October 2026 based on gender-separated national team rankings across two primary tiers:

- World Climbing Series - National Team Ranking: Awards quota places to the top European nations (extending to the 7th-ranked team in speed and 8th-ranked in boulder and lead), providing up to three places per event for the top four nations.
- World Climbing Europe Series - National Team Ranking: Awards additional single-quota places to the highest-ranked eligible European nations not yet qualified via the main series.
- Host Nation: Turkey is guaranteed one quota place per event and gender if unallocated through standard pathways and ranked.

=== Qualified nations ===
Qualified nations by event and gender
Nation	Men			Women			Total
Nation	Speed	Boulder	Lead	Speed	Boulder	Lead	Total
Austria	2	2	2	2	1	3	12
Belgium	—	3	1	—	2	2	8
Bulgaria	1	2	—	—	—	2	5
Czech Republic	1	1	2	1	1	3	9
Finland	—	1	—	—	—	—	1
France	3	3	3	2	3	3	17
Germany	3	2	2	2	2	1	12
Great Britain	1	3	1	1	3	2	11
Israel	—	3	1	—	3	—	7
Italy	3	1	3	3	3	2	15
Latvia	—	1	—	—	—	—	1
Netherlands	—	—	—	1	—	1	2
Norway	—	—	—	—	—	1	1
Poland	1	—	1	3	—	—	5
Romania	—	1	1	—	—	—	2
Russia	—	—	1	—	—	1	2
Slovakia	—	—	1	—	1	—	2
Slovenia	1	1	2	1	2	3	10
Spain	2	2	3	3	1	1	12
Sweden	—	—	—	—	1	—	1
Switzerland	2	1	3	1	2	1	10
Turkey	1	1	1	1	1	1	6
Ukraine	3	—	—	3	1	1	8
Total (23 NOCs)	24	28	28	24	28	28	160

== Los Angeles 2028 ==
The 2027 European Games acts as a direct qualifier for the 2028 Summer Olympics in Los Angeles, offering one Olympic quota per event and gender.
