= European Games =

European multi-sport event

- 2015; 2019; 2023; 2027
- Archery; Athletics; Badminton; Basketball; Beach soccer; Boxing; Canoe sprint; Cycling; Diving; Gymnastics; Judo; Karate; Sambo; Shooting; Swimming; Synchronized swimming; Table tennis; Taekwondo; Triathlon; Water Polo; Volleyball; Wrestling
- Charter; EOC; NOCs
- Other EOC Games: EYOF; Small States of Europe

The European Games is a continental multi-sport event in the Olympic tradition contested by athletes from countries served by National Olympic Committees within the European Olympic Committees (EOC). The EOC represents European nations and several transcontinental countries. An EOC Refugee team is also included. The Games were envisioned and are governed by the EOC which announced their launch at its 41st General Assembly in Rome, on 8 December 2012.

The European Games are the 5th continental Games in the Olympic tradition to be initiated, after the Asian Games, Pan American Games, Pacific Games and African Games. Therefore, as of 2015, every sporting continent (Note: Although the Pacific Games takes in all of Oceania/Australasia, the two largest countries in the region, Australia and New Zealand, did not participate because of the danger they would, though their wealth and size relative to other members, excessively dominate the event. They were however, provisionally admitted to the Games in 4 sports in which other nations were consistently competitive - rugby sevens, weightlifting, sailing and taekwondo - in 2014.) has continental games in the Olympic tradition.

The European Games are not related to the European Championships, which was a separate multi-sport event organised by individual European sports federations.

The European Games are also the third event created and organised by the EOC. The European Youth Olympic Festivals, both winter and summer, and broadly mirroring the Youth Olympic Games are organised biennially, while the quadrennial Games of the Small States of Europe (not to be confused with the separate Island Games) provide competition opportunities for the handful of microstates in the European continent. As of 2026, there are no EOC endorsed European Winter Games.

== List of European Games ==
Host cities of the European Games

Edition	Year	Host city	Host nation	Opened by	Start date	End date	Nations	Competitors	Sports	Events	Top Placed Team	Ref.
I	2015	Baku	Azerbaijan	President Ilham Aliyev	12 June	28 June	50	5,898	21	253	Russia (RUS)	
II	2019	Minsk	Belarus	President Alexander Lukashenko	21 June	30 June	50	4,082	15	200	Russia (RUS)	
III	2023	Kraków; Małopolska	Poland	President Andrzej Duda	21 June	2 July	48	6,857	29	254	Italy (ITA)	
IV	2027	Istanbul	Turkey	TBD	16 June	27 June	TBD		27	TBD		
V	2031	TBD										

== Participating nations ==
As of the 2023 edition, 50 nations whose National Olympic Committee is recognized by the European Olympic Committee have competed at the European Games. In addition, a Refugee EOC team has been created to take part.

- Albania
- Andorra
- Armenia
- Austria
- Azerbaijan
- Belarus
- Belgium
- Bosnia and Herzegovina
- Bulgaria
- Croatia
- Cyprus
- Czech Republic
- Denmark
- Estonia
- Finland
- France
- Georgia
- Germany
- Great Britain
- Greece
- Hungary
- Iceland
- Ireland
- Israel
- Italy
- Kosovo
- Latvia
- Liechtenstein
- Lithuania
- Luxembourg
- Malta
- Moldova
- Monaco
- Montenegro
- Netherlands
- North Macedonia
- Norway
- Poland
- Portugal
- Romania
- Russia
- San Marino
- Serbia
- Slovakia
- Slovenia
- Spain
- Sweden
- Switzerland
- Turkey
- Ukraine
- EOC Refugee Team

== Sports ==
The figures in each cell indicate the number of events for each sport contested at the respective Games.

Sport (Discipline)	Body		2015	2019	2023	2027	NG (Note: Number of Games in which sport was included.)
Sport (Discipline)	World	Europe	2015	2019	2023	2027	NG
Artistic swimming	WAquatics	LEN	4		8	X	3
Diving	WAquatics	LEN	8		13		2
Swimming	WAquatics	LEN	42			X	2
Water polo	WAquatics	LEN	2				1
Archery	WArchery	WAE	5	8	8	X	4
Athletics	WAthletics	EAA	1	10	38	X	4
Badminton	BWF	BE	5	5	5	X	4
Basketball (3x3)	FIBA	FIBAE	2	2	2	X	4
Beach handball	IHF	EHF			2		1
Beach soccer	FIFA	UEFA	1	1	2		3
Boxing	WB	EBC	15	15	13	X	4
Breaking	WDSF				2		1
Canoe slalom	PW	ECA			10		1
Canoe sprint	PW	ECA	15	16	16	X	4
BMX freestyle	UCI	UEC	2		2		2
Mountain biking	UCI	UEC	2		2		2
Road cycling	UCI	UEC	4	4			2
Track cycling	UCI	UEC		20			1
Fencing	FIE	EFC	12		12	X	3
Acrobatic gymnastics	WG	UEG	6	6		X	3
Aerobic gymnastics	WG	UEG	2	2		X	3
Artistic gymnastics	WG	UEG	14	12		X	3
Rhythmic gymnastics	WG	UEG	8	8		X	3
Trampoline	WG	UEG	4	4		X	3
Parkour	WG	UEG				X	1
Judo	IJF	EJU	18	15	1	X	4
Karate	WKF	EKF	12	12	12	X	4
Kickboxing	WAKO				16	X	2
Modern pentathlon	UIPM				5	X	2
Muaythai	IFMA				10	X	2
Padel	IPF				3	X	2
Rowing	WRowing	ERB				X (Note: Beach sprint rowing will be contested during the 2027 Games.)	1
Rugby sevens	WRugby	RE			2	X	2
Sailing	WSailing	EUROSAF				X	1
Sambo (martial art)	FIAS	ESF	8	18			2
Shooting	ISSF	ESC	19	19	30	X	4
Ski jumping	FIS				5		1
Sport climbing	WC				6	X	2
Squash	WS	ESF				X	1
Table tennis	ITTF	ETTU	4	5	5	X	4
Taekwondo	WTaekwondo	ETU	8		16	X	3
Teqball	FITEQ				5		1
Triathlon	WTriathlon	ETU	2		3	X	3
Beach volleyball	FIVB	CEV	2				1
Volleyball	FIVB	CEV	2			X	2
Wrestling	UWW	CELA	24	18		X	3
Weightlifting	IWF	EWF				X	1
Total events			253	200	254	???	—N/a

== Medal table ==
European Games medal table
Rank	NOC	Gold	Silver	Bronze	Total
1	Russia (RUS)	123	64	86	273
2	Italy (ITA)	58	67	63	188
3	Ukraine (UKR)	45	43	51	139
4	Germany (GER)	43	39	73	155
5	Great Britain (GBR)	36	30	53	119
6	France (FRA)	35	41	57	133
7	Spain (ESP)	34	30	36	100
8	Belarus (BLR)	33	27	51	111
9	Azerbaijan (AZE)	29	27	39	95
10	Netherlands (NED)	25	31	21	77
11–46	Remaining	246	307	425	978
Totals (46 entries)		707	706	955	2,368

== See also ==
=== Global Games ===
- Olympic Games
- World Games

=== Other EOC-organised events ===
- European Youth Olympic Festival
- Games of the Small States of Europe

=== Other pan-European Games ===
- European Championships
- European Para Championships
- European Para Youth Games

=== Community-based multi-sport events involving EOC members ===
- Commonwealth Games
- Jeux de la Francophonie
- Lusofonia Games
- Mediterranean Games
- Island Games

=== Other continental games in the Olympic Tradition ===
- African Games
- Asian Games
  - South Asian Games
  - West Asian Games
  - Central Asian Games
  - Southeast Asian Games
- Pacific Games
- Pan American Games
  - Central American and Caribbean Games
  - South American Games
