= Kickboxing at the 2027 European Games =

Kickboxing competition

- Venue: Tuzla Kafkale Sports Complex
- Location: Istanbul, Turkey
- Dates: 16 - 27 June 2027
- Competitors: 144

Kickboxing competitions at the 2027 European Games will be held from 16 to 27 June July 2027 at the Tuzla Kafkale Sports Complex in Istanbul. Eighteen events will be contested across three forms; full contact, light contact (K-1) and point fighting, an increase from sixteen in the previous Games with an extra event in K-1 per sex. This is the second appearance of kickboxing, a non-Olympic discipline, in the European Games.

== Medal table ==
* Host nation (Turkey)

| Rank | Nation | Gold | Silver | Bronze | Total |
|---|---|---|---|---|---|
| 1 | Turkey* | 0 | 0 | 0 | 0 |
| Totals (1 entries) | | 0 | 0 | 0 | 0 |

== Medal summary ==
=== Men ===
| Event | Gold | Silver | Bronze |
Pointfighting
| −63 kg | | | |
| −74 kg | | | |
| −84 kg | | | |
Full contact
| −63.5 kg | | | |
| −75 kg | | | |
| −86 kg | | | |
Light contact
| −63.5 kg | | | |
| −75 kg | | | |
| −91 kg | | | |

=== Women ===
| Event | Gold | Silver | Bronze |
Pointfighting
| −50 kg | | | |
| −60 kg | | | |
| −70 kg | | | |
Full contact
| −52 kg | | | |
| −60 kg | | | |
| −70 kg | | | |
Light contact (K-1)
| −52 kg | | | |
| −60 kg | | | |
| −70 kg | | | |

== Participating nations ==
A total of 144 athletes from 30 National Olympic Committees (NOCs) have qualified to compete in kickboxing at the 2027 European Games. Hungary leads the field with 13 qualified competitors, followed closely by Greece with 12, and Germany and host nation Turkey with 10 each.

- Austria (2)
- Azerbaijan (3)
- Bosnia and Herzegovina (1)
- Bulgaria (4)
- Croatia (5)
- Czech Republic (5)
- Finland (2)
- France (2)
- Georgia (3)
- Germany (10)
- Great Britain (7)
- Greece (12)
- Hungary (13)
- Ireland (6)
- Israel (5)
- Italy (9)
- Latvia (1)
- Moldova (1)
- Netherlands (2)
- Norway (4)
- Poland (8)
- Portugal (2)
- Russia (6)
- Slovakia (3)
- Slovenia (2)
- Spain (4)
- Sweden (1)
- Switzerland (3)
- Turkey (10) (host)
- Ukraine (8)

== Qualification ==
Qualification for the kickboxing tournament is governed by the results from the 2026 European Amateur Kickboxing Championships; the top eight athletes in each European Games class wins a single quota space for their NOC.

| NOC | Men | | | | | | | | | Women | | | | | | | | | Total |
| NOC | Point Fighting | | | Full Contact | | | Light Contact (K-1) | | | Point Fighting | | | Full Contact | | | Light Contact (K-1) | | | Total |
| NOC | -63 | -74 | -84 | -63.5 | -75 | -86 | -63.5 | -75 | -91 | -50 | -60 | -70 | -52 | -60 | -70 | -52 | -60 | -70 | Total |
|---|---|---|---|---|---|---|---|---|---|---|---|---|---|---|---|---|---|---|---|
| Austria | | | ✓ | | | | | | ✓ | | | | | | | | | | 2 |
| Azerbaijan | | | | ✓ | | ✓ | ✓ | | | | | | | | | | | | 3 |
| Bosnia | | | | | | | | | ✓ | | | | | | | | | | 1 |
| Bulgaria | ✓ | ✓ | | | | | | | | ✓ | ✓ | | | | | | | | 4 |
| Croatia | | | | | ✓ | ✓ | | | ✓ | | | | | | ✓ | ✓ | | | 5 |
| Czech Republic | | | | | | | | ✓ | ✓ | | | | | | ✓ | ✓ | | ✓ | 5 |
| Finland | | | | | | | | | | | | | ✓ | | | | ✓ | | 2 |
| France | | | | | ✓ | | | | | | | | | | | | ✓ | | 2 |
| Georgia | | | | | ✓ | | | | | | | | ✓ | ✓ | | | | | 3 |
| Germany | | ✓ | ✓ | | ✓ | | | | ✓ | ✓ | ✓ | ✓ | ✓ | | | ✓ | | ✓ | 10 |
| Great Britain | ✓ | ✓ | ✓ | ✓ | | | | ✓ | | ✓ | | ✓ | | | | | | | 7 |
| Greece | | ✓ | ✓ | ✓ | | ✓ | | ✓ | ✓ | ✓ | ✓ | ✓ | ✓ | | ✓ | | ✓ | | 12 |
| Hungary | ✓ | ✓ | ✓ | ✓ | | ✓ | ✓ | | | ✓ | ✓ | ✓ | ✓ | ✓ | ✓ | | | ✓ | 13 |
| Ireland | ✓ | | ✓ | ✓ | ✓ | | | | | | | | | ✓ | | | ✓ | | 6 |
| Israel | ✓ | | | | | | ✓ | ✓ | | | | | | | | ✓ | | ✓ | 5 |
| Italy | ✓ | ✓ | ✓ | | | ✓ | | | | ✓ | ✓ | ✓ | | ✓ | | ✓ | | | 9 |
| Latvia | | | | | ✓ | | | | | | | | | | | | | | 1 |
| Moldova | | | | | | | | ✓ | | | | | | | | | | | 1 |
| Netherlands | ✓ | | | | | | | | | | ✓ | | | | | | | | 2 |
| Norway | | | | | | | | | | | | ✓ | ✓ | ✓ | ✓ | | | | 4 |
| Poland | | ✓ | | ✓ | | ✓ | ✓ | | | | ✓ | | | | ✓ | | ✓ | ✓ | 8 |
| Portugal | | | | | | | | | | | | | | | | ✓ | | ✓ | 2 |
| Russia | ✓ | | ✓ | | ✓ | | | | | ✓ | ✓ | | | ✓ | | | | | 6 |
| Slovakia | | | | | | ✓ | | | ✓ | | | | ✓ | | | | | | 3 |
| Slovenia | | | | | | | | | | ✓ | | ✓ | | | | | | | 2 |
| Spain | | | | | | | ✓ | ✓ | | | | | | | | ✓ | ✓ | | 4 |
| Sweden | | | | | | | | | | | | | | | | | | ✓ | 1 |
| Switzerland | | | | ✓ | | | ✓ | | | | | | | | | | | ✓ | 3 |
| Turkey (host) | | ✓ | | | ✓ | | ✓ | ✓ | ✓ | | | ✓ | ✓ | ✓ | ✓ | | ✓ | | 10 |
| Ukraine | | | | ✓ | | ✓ | ✓ | ✓ | | | | | | ✓ | ✓ | ✓ | ✓ | | 8 |
| Total: 30 NOCs | 8 | 8 | 8 | 8 | 8 | 8 | 8 | 8 | 8 | 8 | 8 | 8 | 8 | 8 | 8 | 8 | 8 | 8 | 144 |
