= Gymnastics at the 2027 European Games =

Gymnastics competitions at the 2027 European Games

- Venue: Sinan Erdem Dome
- Location: Istanbul, Turkey
- Dates: 16–27 June 2027
- Competitors: 496

Gymnastics at the 2027 European Games in Istanbul, Turkey, is scheduled to be held between 16 and 27 June 2027 at the Sinan Erdem Dome. Gymnastics returns to the European Games programme after being omitted from the 2023 edition in Kraków-Małopolska.

A total of 496 athletes will compete across 41 events in six disciplines: artistic gymnastics, rhythmic gymnastics, trampoline gymnastics (including tumbling and double mini-trampoline), acrobatic gymnastics, aerobic gymnastics, and parkour, which makes its European Games debut.

== Qualification ==
A total of 496 quota places are available across all gymnastics and parkour events: 192 in artistic gymnastics (96 men and 96 women), 96 in rhythmic gymnastics (16 individuals and 16 groups of five), 80 in trampoline gymnastics (48 in trampoline, 16 in tumbling, and 16 in double mini-trampoline), 56 in aerobic gymnastics (8 groups of five and 8 mixed pairs), 40 in acrobatic gymnastics (8 women's groups of three and 8 mixed pairs), and 32 in parkour (16 men and 16 women).

Most quota places are allocated to National Olympic Committees (NOCs) through designated 2026 and 2027 World and European qualifying competitions, with Turkey, the host nation, guaranteed reserved spots across disciplines.

== Participating nations ==
A total of 136 athletes from 24 National Olympic Committees (NOCs) have qualified for the gymnastics and parkour competitions as of 11 November 2026.

- Austria (1)
- Azerbaijan (6)
- Belarus (4) (Note: Athletes from Belarus and Russia competed as Authorised Neutral Athletes (AIN) at qualifying events.)
- Belgium (4)
- Bulgaria (6)
- Czech Republic (2)
- Denmark (4)
- Finland (5)
- France (5)
- Georgia (2)
- Germany (6)
- Great Britain (4)
- Greece (4)
- Hungary (5)
- Italy (9)
- Netherlands (5)
- Poland (2)
- Portugal (8)
- Romania (7)
- Russia (16)
- Spain (15)
- Sweden (1)
- Turkey (11) (Host)
- Ukraine (4)

== Competition schedule ==
Discipline		Event dates	Medal events	Venue
Acrobatic gymnastics			6	Sinan Erdem Dome
Aerobic gymnastics			2	Sinan Erdem Dome
Artistic gymnastics			13	Sinan Erdem Dome
Parkour			4	Sinan Erdem Dome
Rhythmic gymnastics			8	Sinan Erdem Dome
Trampoline	Trampoline		4	Sinan Erdem Dome
Trampoline	Mini double and tumbling		4	Sinan Erdem Dome
total			41	Sinan Erdem Dome

== Medal summary ==
=== Medal table ===
* Host nation (Turkey)

Rank	Nation	Gold	Silver	Bronze	Total
1	Turkey*	0	0	0	0
Totals (1 entries)		0	0	0	0

=== Artistic gymnastics ===
==== Men's events ====
Event	Gold	Silver	Bronze
Individual all-around			
Floor exercise			
Pommel horse			
Rings			
Vault			
Parallel bars			
Horizontal bar			

==== Women's events ====
Event	Gold	Silver	Bronze
Individual all-around			
Vault			
Uneven bars			
Balance beam			
Floor exercise			

==== Mixed event ====
Event	Gold	Silver	Bronze
Mixed team			

=== Rhythmic gymnastics ===
==== Individual ====
Event	Gold	Silver	Bronze
Individual all-around			
Hoop			
Ball			
Clubs			
Ribbon			

==== Group ====
Event	Gold	Silver	Bronze
Group all-around			
5 balls			
3 hoops and 2 pairs of clubs			

=== Trampoline gymnastics ===
==== Trampoline ====
Event	Gold	Silver	Bronze
Men's individual trampoline			
Men's synchronised trampoline			
Women's individual trampoline			
Women's synchronised trampoline			

==== Mini double trampoline and tumbling ====
Event	Gold	Silver	Bronze
Men's tumbling			
Men's double mini-trampoline			
Women's tumbling			
Women's double mini-trampoline			

=== Acrobatic gymnastics ===
Event	Gold	Silver	Bronze
Women's group all-around			
Women's group balance			
Women's group dynamic			
Mixed pair all-around			
Mixed pair balance			
Mixed pair dynamic			

=== Aerobic gymnastics ===
Event	Gold	Silver	Bronze
Mixed pair			
Mixed group			

=== Parkour ===
Event	Gold	Silver	Bronze
Men's speed			
Men's freestyle			
Women's speed			
Women's freestyle			
