= Azerbaijan at the European Games =

- IOC code: AZE
- NOC: National Olympic Committee of the Republic of Azerbaijan
- Website: www.olympic.az
- Medals: Gold 29 Silver 27 Bronze 39 Total 95

European Games appearances (overview)
- 2015; 2019; 2023; 2027

Azerbaijan participated at the inaugural edition of the European Games in 2015.

== Medal tables ==
=== Medals by Games ===
Games	Athletes	Gold	Silver	Bronze	Total	Rank
(Azerbaijan) 2015 Baku	291	21	15	20	56	2
(Belarus) 2019 Minsk	80	5	10	13	28	10
(Poland) 2023 Kraków	100	3	2	6	11	24
(Turkey) 2027 Istanbul	Future event					
Total	471	29	27	39	95	9
Total Games		707	706	955	2,368	-

Azerbaijan gain 95 medals of 2,368 medals.

=== European Championships ===
Games	Athletes	Gold	Silver	Bronze	Total	Rank
(United Kingdom) 2018	21	0	1	0	1	29
(Germany) 2022	12	0	0	0	0	-
Total	33	0	1	0	1	37
Total Games		363	362	365	1090	-

Azerbaijan gain 1 medals of 1,090 medals.

=== European Para Championships ===
2023 European Para Championships

2027 European Para Championships

=== Medals by sports ===
Sport	Gold	Silver	Bronze	Total
Wrestling	9	5	11	25
Karate	7	3	4	14
Boxing	7	2	6	15
Taekwondo	3	2	2	7
Gymnastics	1	5	4	10
Judo	1	3	5	9
Kickboxing	1	0	0	1
Sambo	0	5	2	7
Fencing	0	1	1	2
Canoe sprint	0	1	0	1
Muaythai	0	0	3	3
Triathlon	0	0	1	1
Totals (12 entries)	29	27	39	95

== List of medallists ==
Medal	Name(s)	Games	Sport	Event
Gold	Firdovsi Farzaliyev	(Azerbaijan) 2015 Baku	Karate	Men's 60 kg
Gold	Rafael Aghayev	(Azerbaijan) 2015 Baku	Karate	Men's 75 kg
Gold	Rasul Chunayev	(Azerbaijan) 2015 Baku	Wrestling	Men's Greco-Roman 71 kg
Gold	Irina Zaretska	(Azerbaijan) 2015 Baku	Karate	Women's 68 kg
Gold	Aykhan Mamayev	(Azerbaijan) 2015 Baku	Karate	Men's 84 kg
Gold	Elvin Mursaliyev	(Azerbaijan) 2015 Baku	Wrestling	Men's Greco-Roman 75 kg
Gold	Mariya Stadnyk	(Azerbaijan) 2015 Baku	Wrestling	Women's Freestyle 48 kg
Gold	Anzhela Dorogan	(Azerbaijan) 2015 Baku	Wrestling	Women's Freestyle 53 kg
Gold	Parviz Ahmadov	(Azerbaijan) 2015 Baku	Wrestling	Men's Freestyle 65 kg
Gold	Khetag Gazyumov	(Azerbaijan) 2015 Baku	Wrestling	Men's Freestyle 97 kg
Gold	Aykhan Taghizadeh	(Azerbaijan) 2015 Baku	Taekwondo	Men's 68 kg
Gold	Milad Beigi	(Azerbaijan) 2015 Baku	Taekwondo	Men's 80 kg
Gold	Radik Isayev	(Azerbaijan) 2015 Baku	Taekwondo	Men's +80 kg
Gold	Oleh Stepko	(Azerbaijan) 2015 Baku	Gymnastics	Men's artistic individual all-around
Gold	Teymur Mammadov	(Azerbaijan) 2015 Baku	Boxing	Men's 81 kg
Gold	Elvin Mamishzada	(Azerbaijan) 2015 Baku	Boxing	Men's 52 kg
Gold	Lorenzo Sotomayor	(Azerbaijan) 2015 Baku	Boxing	Men's 64 kg
Gold	Ilham Zakiyev	(Azerbaijan) 2015 Baku	Judo	Men's Visually impaired +90 kg
Gold	Albert Selimov	(Azerbaijan) 2015 Baku	Boxing	Men's 60 kg
Gold	Parviz Baghirov	(Azerbaijan) 2015 Baku	Boxing	Men's 69 kg
Gold	Abdulkadir Abdullayev	(Azerbaijan) 2015 Baku	Boxing	Men's 91 kg
Silver	Rafig Huseynov	(Azerbaijan) 2015 Baku	Wrestling	Men's Greco-Roman 80 kg
Silver	Sabahi Shariati	(Azerbaijan) 2015 Baku	Wrestling	Men's Greco-Roman 130 kg
Silver	Valentin Demyanenko	(Azerbaijan) 2015 Baku	Canoe sprint	Men's C1-200m
Silver	Oleh Stepko	(Azerbaijan) 2015 Baku	Gymnastics	Men's parallel bars
Silver	Farida Azizova	(Azerbaijan) 2015 Baku	Taekwondo	Women's 67 kg
Silver	Oleh Stepko	(Azerbaijan) 2015 Baku	Gymnastics	Men's pommel horse
Silver	Marina Durunda	(Azerbaijan) 2015 Baku	Gymnastics	Women's rhythmic individual ribbon
Silver	Islam Gasimov	(Azerbaijan) 2015 Baku	Sambo	Men's 57 kg
Silver	Amil Gasimov	(Azerbaijan) 2015 Baku	Sambo	Men's 74 kg
Silver	Nazakat Khalilova	(Azerbaijan) 2015 Baku	Sambo	Women's 52 kg
Silver	Vasif Safarbeyov	(Azerbaijan) 2015 Baku	Sambo	Men's +100 kg
Silver	Orkhan Safarov	(Azerbaijan) 2015 Baku	Judo	Men's 60 kg
Silver	Sevil Bunyadova	(Azerbaijan) 2015 Baku	Fencing	Women's sabre
Silver	Sabina Abdullayeva	(Azerbaijan) 2015 Baku	Judo	Women's Visually impaired 57 kg
Silver	Khaybula Musalov	(Azerbaijan) 2015 Baku	Boxing	Men's 75 kg
Bronze	Niyazi Aliyev	(Azerbaijan) 2015 Baku	Karate	Men's 67 kg
Bronze	Ilaha Gasimova	(Azerbaijan) 2015 Baku	Karate	Women's 55 kg
Bronze	Elman Mukhtarov	(Azerbaijan) 2015 Baku	Wrestling	Men's Greco-Roman 59 kg
Bronze	Rostyslav Pevtsov	(Azerbaijan) 2015 Baku	Triathlon	Men's
Bronze	Hasan Aliyev	(Azerbaijan) 2015 Baku	Wrestling	Men's Greco-Roman 66 kg
Bronze	Petro Pakhnyuk; Oleh Stepko; Eldar Safarov	(Azerbaijan) 2015 Baku	Gymnastics	Men's artistic team all-around
Bronze	Nataliya Synyshyn	(Azerbaijan) 2015 Baku	Wrestling	Women's Freestyle 55 kg
Bronze	Patimat Abakarova	(Azerbaijan) 2015 Baku	Taekwondo	Women's 49 kg
Bronze	Jabrayil Hasanov	(Azerbaijan) 2015 Baku	Wrestling	Men's Freestyle 74 kg
Bronze	Haji Aliyev	(Azerbaijan) 2015 Baku	Wrestling	Men's Freestyle 61 kg
Bronze	Ruslan Dibirgadjiyev	(Azerbaijan) 2015 Baku	Wrestling	Men's freestyle 70 kg
Bronze	Jamaladdin Magomedov	(Azerbaijan) 2015 Baku	Wrestling	Men's freestyle 125 kg
Bronze	Oleh Stepko	(Azerbaijan) 2015 Baku	Gymnastics	Men's vault
Bronze	Tayfur Aliyev	(Azerbaijan) 2015 Baku	Boxing	Men's 56 kg
Bronze	Ilya Grishunin	(Azerbaijan) 2015 Baku	Gymnastics	Men's trampoline individual
Bronze	Anna Alimardanova	(Azerbaijan) 2015 Baku	Boxing	Women's 54 kg
Bronze	Sevinj Bunyadova	(Azerbaijan) 2015 Baku	Fencing	Women's sabre
Bronze	Mahammadrasul Majidov	(Azerbaijan) 2015 Baku	Boxing	Men's +91 kg
Bronze	Zakir Mislimov	(Azerbaijan) 2015 Baku	Judo	Men's Visually impaired +90 kg

== See also ==
- Azerbaijan at the Olympics
- European Youth Olympic Festival
- European Para Youth Games
