= Croatia at the European Games =

- IOC code: CRO
- NOC: Croatian Olympic Committee
- Website: www.hoo.hr
- Medals Ranked 24th: Gold 8 Silver 9 Bronze 15 Total 32

European Games appearances (overview)
- 2015; 2019; 2023; 2027

Croatia participated at the inaugural edition of the European Games in 2015.

== Medal tables ==
=== Medals by Games ===
Games	Athletes	Gold	Silver	Bronze	Total	Rank
(Azerbaijan) 2015 Baku	106	1	4	6	11	25
(Belarus) 2019 Minsk	45	2	1	5	8	28
(Poland) 2023 Kraków	45	5	4	4	13	17
(Turkey) 2027 Istanbul	Future event					
Total		8	9	15	32	24

=== Medals by sports ===
Sport	Gold	Silver	Bronze	Total
Taekwondo	3	2	6	11
Karate	3	2	1	6
Shooting	1	2	0	3
Sambo	1	0	0	1
Boxing	0	1	3	4
Athletics	0	1	0	1
Swimming	0	1	0	1
Archery	0	0	1	1
Judo	0	0	1	1
Kickboxing	0	0	1	1
Table tennis	0	0	1	1
Wrestling	0	0	1	1
Totals (12 entries)	8	9	15	32

== List of medallists ==
Medal	Name(s)	Games	Sport	Event
Gold	Maša Martinović	(Azerbaijan) 2015 Baku	Karate	Women's +68 kg
Silver	Jelena Kovačević	(Azerbaijan) 2015 Baku	Karate	Women's 55 kg
Silver	Ana Zaninović	(Azerbaijan) 2015 Baku	Taekwondo	Women's 57 kg
Silver	Petar Gorša	(Azerbaijan) 2015 Baku	Shooting	Men's 50 metre rifle three positions
Silver	Nikola Obravac	(Azerbaijan) 2015 Baku	Swimming	Men's 50 metre breaststroke
Bronze	Ana Lenard	(Azerbaijan) 2015 Baku	Karate	Women's 61 kg
Bronze	Josip Bepo Filipi	(Azerbaijan) 2015 Baku	Boxing	Men's 91 kg
Bronze	Lucija Zaninović	(Azerbaijan) 2015 Baku	Taekwondo	Women's 49 kg
Bronze	Iva Radoš	(Azerbaijan) 2015 Baku	Taekwondo	Women's +67 kg
Bronze	Vedran Golec	(Azerbaijan) 2015 Baku	Taekwondo	Men's +80 kg
Bronze	Dominik Etlinger	(Azerbaijan) 2015 Baku	Wrestling	Men's Greco-Roman 71 kg

== See also ==
- Croatia at the Olympics
- Croatia at the Mediterranean Games
