= 2031 European Games =

V European Games
- Host city: TBD
- Nations: 50 (expected)
- Website: Official website

The 5th European Games, also known as the 2031 European Games, is an edition of the European Games planned to be held in 2031.

== Host selection ==
=== Potential bids ===
- Munich, Germany

In June 2026, the German Olympic Sports Confederation announced it had expressed interest in hosting the 2031 European Games. The organisation said its hosting of the European Games would fall under its National Strategy for Major Sporting Events, alongside its ambition to host the Summer Olympic and Paralympic Games in either 2036, 2040 or 2044. Munich was chosen as a candidate city on 26 September at an assembly in Baden-Baden.

== Participating National Olympic Committees ==
Up to 50 National Olympic Committees who are members of the European Olympic Committees are able to send delegations. An EOC Refugee Team may also participate.
