= Armenia at the European Games =

- IOC code: ARM
- NOC: Armenian Olympic Committee
- Website: www.armnoc.am
- Medals Ranked 32nd: Gold 5 Silver 5 Bronze 5 Total 15

European Games appearances (overview)
- 2015; 2019; 2023; 2027

Armenia participated at the inaugural edition of the European Games in 2015.

== Medal tables ==
=== Medals by Games ===
Games	Athletes	Gold	Silver	Bronze	Total	Rank
(Azerbaijan) 2015 Baku	25	0	1	0	1	36
(Belarus) 2019 Minsk	37	5	3	3	11	11
(Poland) 2023 Krakow	52	0	1	2	3	37
(Turkey) 2027 Istanbul	Future event					
Total		5	5	5	15	33

=== Medals by sports ===
Sport	Gold	Silver	Bronze	Total
Boxing	2	0	2	4
Wrestling	1	2	0	3
Sambo	1	1	1	3
Gymnastics	1	1	0	2
Shooting	0	1	0	1
Karate	0	0	1	1
Muaythai	0	0	1	1
Totals (7 entries)	5	5	5	15

== List of medallists ==
Medal	Name(s)	Games	Sport	Event
Silver	Migran Arutyunyan	(Azerbaijan) 2015 Baku	Wrestling	Men's Greco-Roman 66 kg
Gold	Tigran Kirakosyan	(Belarus) 2019 Minsk	Sambo	Men's 52 kg
Gold	Artur Hovhannisyan	(Belarus) 2019 Minsk	Boxing	Men's 49 kg
Gold	Hovhannes Bachkov	(Belarus) 2019 Minsk	Boxing	Men's 64 kg
Gold	Artur Aleksanyan	(Belarus) 2019 Minsk	Wrestling	Men's Greco-Roman 97 kg
Gold	Artur Davtyan	(Belarus) 2019 Minsk	Gymnastics	Men's vault
Silver	Davit Grigoryan	(Belarus) 2019 Minsk	Sambo	Men's 82 kg
Silver	Karapet Chalyan	(Belarus) 2019 Minsk	Wrestling	Men's Greco-Roman 77 kg
Silver	Vahagn Davtyan	(Belarus) 2019 Minsk	Gymnastics	Men's rings
Bronze	Arsen Ghazaryan	(Belarus) 2019 Minsk	Sambo	Men's 74 kg
Bronze	Gor Nersesyan	(Belarus) 2019 Minsk	Boxing	Men's 81 kg
Bronze	Karen Tonakanyan	(Belarus) 2019 Minsk	Boxing	Men's 60 kg
Silver	Benik Khlghatyan; Elmira Karapetyan	(Poland) 2023 Kraków	Shooting	Mixed team 10 metre air pistol
Bronze	Anita Makyan	(Poland) 2023 Kraków	Karate	Women's kumite 68 kg
Bronze	Narek Khachikyan	(Poland) 2023 Kraków	Muaythai	Men's 60kg

== See also ==
- Armenia at the Olympics
- Armenia at the Paralympics
- Sport in Armenia
