= Italy at the European Games =

- IOC code: ITA
- NOC: National Olympic Committee of Italy
- Website: www.coni.it (in Italian)
- Medals Ranked 2nd: Gold 58 Silver 67 Bronze 63 Total 188

European Games appearances (overview)
- 2015; 2019; 2023; 2027

Italy has competed at the European Games since the inaugural 2015 Games.

== Medal tables ==
=== Medals by Games ===
Games	Athletes	Gold	Silver	Bronze	Total	Rank
(Azerbaijan) 2015 Baku	295	10	26	11	47	6
(Belarus) 2019 Minsk	187	13	15	13	42	4
(Poland) 2023 Krakow	372	35	26	39	100	1
(Turkey) 2027 Istanbul	Future event					
Total		58	67	63	188	2

=== Medals by sport ===
Leading in that sport

Sport	Gold	Silver	Bronze	Total
Shooting	16	8	11	35
Athletics	8	5	4	17
Archery	7	2	4	13
Kickboxing	6	2	2	10
Fencing	5	4	10	19
Karate	2	7	7	16
Cycling	2	5	3	10
Diving	2	4	5	11
Gymnastics	2	1	0	3
Modern pentathlon	2	0	1	3
Swimming	1	9	0	10
Boxing	1	7	7	15
Artistic swimming	1	3	1	5
Taekwondo	1	1	2	4
Padel	1	1	1	3
Canoe sprint	1	1	0	2
Sport climbing	0	2	1	3
Beach soccer	0	2	0	2
Judo	0	1	3	4
Muaythai	0	1	0	1
Wrestling	0	1	0	1
Canoe slalom	0	0	1	1
Totals (22 entries)	58	67	63	188

== See also ==
- Italy at the Olympics
