= Great Britain at the European Games =

- IOC code: GBR
- NOC: British Olympic Association
- Website: www.teamgb.com
- Medals Ranked 7th: Gold 36 Silver 30 Bronze 53 Total 119

European Games appearances (overview)
- 2015; 2019; 2023; 2027

Great Britain first participated at the European Games at the inaugural 2015 Games and earned 47 medals. This tally was more than halved at the 2019 Games, due to the removal of swimming from the competition schedule.

== Medal tables ==
Games	Athletes	Gold	Silver	Bronze	Total	Rank
(Azerbaijan) 2015 Baku	160	18	11	18	47	3
(Belarus) 2019 Minsk	101	6	9	8	23	9
(Poland) 2023 Krakow	223	12	10	27	49	7
(Turkey) 2027 Istanbul	Future event					
Total		36	30	53	119	5

=== Medals by sport ===
Sport	Gold	Silver	Bronze	Total
Swimming	7	7	9	23
Diving	7	3	3	13
Boxing	5	1	10	16
Taekwondo	4	1	3	8
Archery	3	2	0	5
Badminton	2	4	3	9
Cycling	2	2	2	6
Canoe slalom	1	1	3	5
Shooting	1	1	3	5
Modern pentathlon	1	1	2	4
Rugby sevens	1	1	0	2
Triathlon	1	1	0	2
Fencing	1	0	1	2
Gymnastics	0	3	4	7
Canoe sprint	0	2	0	2
Judo	0	1	1	2
Athletics	0	0	5	5
Artistic swimming	0	0	3	3
Totals (18 entries)	36	31	52	119

== Medallists ==
The following British competitors won medals at the 2015 and 2019 editions.

Medal	Name	Sport	Event	Date
Gold	Gordon Benson	Triathlon	Men's triathlon	14 June
Gold	Charlie Maddock	Taekwondo	Women's −49kg	16 June
Gold	Jade Jones	Taekwondo	Women's −57kg	17 June
Gold	Lois Toulson	Diving	Women's platform	18 June
Gold	Amber Hill	Shooting	Women's skeet	20 June
Gold	James Heatly	Diving	Men's 3m springboard	20 June
Gold	Matty Lee	Diving	Men's 10m platform	21 June
Gold	Katherine Torrance	Diving	Women's 3m springboard	21 June
Gold	Abbie Wood	Swimming	Women's 400m ind. medley	23 June
Gold	Holly Hibbott	Swimming	Women's 800m freestyle	23 June
Gold	Duncan Scott; Daniel Speers; Martyn Walton; Tom Fannon; Cameron Kurle; Matthew Lee	Swimming	Men's 4 × 100 m freestyle relay	23 June
Gold	Luke Greenbank	Swimming	Men's 100m backstroke	24 June
Gold	Nicola Adams	Boxing	Women's 51kg	25 June
Gold	Duncan Scott	Swimming	Men's 100m freestyle	25 June
Gold	Luke Greenbank	Swimming	Men's 200m backstroke	26 June
Gold	Joe Joyce	Boxing	Men's +91 kg	26 June
Gold	Richard Kruse; Marcus Mepstead; Alexander Tofalides; Ben Peggs	Fencing	Men's team foil	27 June
Gold	Duncan Scott	Swimming	Men's 200m freestyle	27 June
Silver	Ed McKeever	Canoe sprint	Men's K1-200m	16 June
Silver	Lani Belcher	Canoe sprint	Women's K1-5000m	16 June
Silver	James Heatly; Ross Haslam	Diving	Men's 3m synchronised springboard	19 June
Silver	Katherine Driscoll	Gymnastics	Women's trampoline	21 June
Silver	Duncan Scott; Martyn Walton; Georgia Coates; Darcy Deakin; Hannah Featherstone; Madeleine Crompton; Daniel Speers; Cameron Kurle	Swimming	Mixed 4 × 100 m freestyle relay	24 June
Silver	Jarvis Parkinson	Swimming	Men's 200m ind. medley	25 June
Silver	Duncan Scott; Martyn Walton; Kyle Chisholm; Cameron Kurle	Swimming	Men's 4 × 200 m freestyle relay	25 June
Silver	Amelia Clynes	Swimming	Women's 100m butterfly	26 June
Silver	Luke Greenbank; Charlie Attwood; Amelia Clynes; Georgia Coates; Joe Litchfield; Luke Davies; Abbie Wood; Hannah Featherstone	Swimming	Mixed 4 x 100 metre medley relay	26 June
Silver	Cameron Kurle	Swimming	Men's 200m freestyle	27 June
Silver	Duncan Scott; Charlie Attwood; Martyn Walton; Luke Greenbank; Cameron Kurle; Kyle Chisholm; Luke Davies; Joe Hulme	Swimming	Men's 4 × 100 m medley relay	27 June
Bronze	James Heatly	Diving	Men's 1m springboard	18 June
Bronze	Lutalo Muhammad	Taekwondo	Men's −80kg	18 June
Bronze	Ryan Bartlett; Hannah Baughn	Gymnastics	Mixed acrobatics pair all-around	19 June
Bronze	Brinn Bevan	Gymnastics	Men's pommel horse	20 June
Bronze	Ryan Bartlett; Hannah Baughn	Gymnastics	Mixed acrobatics pair dynamic	21 June
Bronze	Ryan Bartlett; Hannah Baughn	Gymnastics	Mixed acrobatics pair balance	21 June
Bronze	Holly Hibbott; Madeleine Crompton; Georgia Coates; Darcy Deakin; Hannah Featherstone	Swimming	Women's 4 × 100 m freestyle relay	23 June
Bronze	Qais Ashfaq	Boxing	Men's 59kg	24 June
Bronze	Luke Davies	Swimming	Men's 200m breaststroke	24 June
Bronze	Sandy Ryan	Boxing	Women's 64kg	25 June
Bronze	Layla Black	Swimming	Women's 200m breaststroke	25 June
Bronze	Martyn Walton	Swimming	Men's 200m ind. medley	25 June
Bronze	Emma Cain; Rebecca Sherwin; Darcy Deakin; Abbie Wood; Layla Black; Georgia Coates; Amelia Clynes	Swimming	Women's 4 × 100 m medley relay	25 June
Bronze	Josh Kelly	Boxing	Men's 64kg	26 June
Bronze	Laura Stephens	Swimming	Women's 100m butterfly	26 June
Bronze	Holly Hibbott; Madeleine Crompton; Georgia Coates; Darcy Deakin; Hannah Featherstone	Swimming	Women's 4 × 200 m freestyle relay	27 June
Bronze	Abbie Wood	Swimming	Women's 100m ind. medley	27 June
Bronze	Charlie Attwood	Swimming	Men's 100m breaststroke	27 June
Gold	Sarah Bettles; Naomi Folkard; Bryony Pitman	Archery	Women's team recurve	22 June
Silver	Naomi Folkard; Patrick Huston	Archery	Mixed team recurve	23 June
Silver	Alice Schlesinger	Judo	Women's −63kg	23 June
Silver	Megan Barker; Jennifer Holl; Josie Knight; Jessica Roberts	Cycling	Women's team pursuit	28 June
Bronze	Chelsie Giles	Judo	Women's −52kg	22 June
Bronze	Aaron Heading	Shooting	Men's Trap	23 June
Bronze	Hayley Simmonds	Cycling	Women's time trial	25 June
Bronze	Jack Carlin; Jason Kenny; Ryan Owens	Cycling	Men's team sprint	27 June
Bronze	Galal Yafai	Boxing	Men's 52kg	28 June
Bronze	Peter McGrail	Boxing	Men's 56kg	28 June
Bronze	Luke McCormack	Boxing	Men's 64kg	28 June
Bronze	Cheavon Clarke	Boxing	Men's 91kg	28 June
Gold	Pat McCormack	Boxing	Men's 69kg	29 June
Silver	Ben Whittaker	Boxing	Men's 81kg	29 June
Gold	Marcus Ellis; Chris Langridge	Badminton	Men's doubles	29 June
Silver	Chloe Birch; Lauren Smith	Badminton	Women's doubles	29 June
Gold	Marcus Ellis; Lauren Smith	Badminton	Mixed doubles	30 June
Silver	Chris Adcock; Gabby Adcock	Badminton	Mixed doubles	30 June
Silver	Kirsty Gilmour	Badminton	Women's singles	30 June
Gold	Lauren Price	Boxing	Women's 69kg	30 June
Gold	Megan Barker; Jessica Roberts	Cycling	Women's madison	30 June
Silver	Rebecca Downie	Gymnastics	Women's uneven bars	30 June
Silver	Giarnni Regini-Moran	Gymnastics	Men's floor	30 June

=== Multiple medallists ===
The following Team GB competitors won multiple medals at the 2015 European Games.

Name	Medal	Sport	Event	Date
Duncan Scott	Gold; Gold; Gold; Silver; Silver; Silver	Swimming	Men's 200 metre freestyle Men's 100 metre freestyle Men's 4 x 100 metre freestyle relay Mixed 4 x 100 metre freestyle relay Men's 4 x 200 metre freestyle relay Men's 4 x 100 metre medley relay	27 June; 25 June; 23 June; 24 June; 25 June; 27 June
Luke Greenbank	Gold; Gold; Silver; Silver	Swimming	Men's 100 metre backstroke Men's 200 metre backstroke Mixed 4 x 100 metre medley relay Men's 4 x 100 metre medley relay	24 June; 26 June; 26 June; 27 June
Cameron Kurle	Gold; Silver; Silver; Silver; Silver	Swimming	Men's 4 x 100 metre freestyle relay Mixed 4 x 100 metre freestyle relay Men's 4 x 200 metre freestyle relay Men's 4 x 100 metre medley relay Men's 200 metre freestyle	23 June; 24 June; 25 June; 27 June; 27 June
Martyn Walton	Gold; Silver; Silver; Silver; Bronze	Swimming	Men's 4 x 100 metre freestyle relay Mixed 4 x 100 metre freestyle relay Men's 4 x 200 metre freestyle relay Men's 4 x 100 medley freestyle relay Men's 200 metre ind. medley	23 June; 24 June; 25 June; 27 June; 25 June
James Heatly	Gold; Silver; Bronze	Diving	Men's 3m springboard Men's 3m synchro springboard Men's 1m springboard	20 June; 19 June; 18 June
Abbie Wood	Gold; Silver; Bronze; Bronze	Swimming	Women's 400 metre ind. medley Mixed 4 x 100 metre medley relay Women's 4 x 100 metre medley relay Women's 200 metre ind. medley	23 June; 27 June; 25 June; 27 June
Daniel Speers	Gold; Silver	Swimming	Men's 4 x 100 metre freestyle relay Mixed 4 x 100 metre freestyle relay	23 June; 24 June
Holly Hibbott	Gold; Bronze; Bronze	Swimming	Women's 400 metre freestyle Women's 4 x 100 metre freestyle relay Women's 4 x 100 metre freestyle relay	23 June; 23 June; 27 June
Georgia Coates	Silver; Silver; Bronze; Bronze; Bronze	Swimming	Mixed 4 x 100 metre freestyle relay Mixed 4 x 100 metre medley relay Women's 4 x 100 metre freestyle relay Women's 4 x 100 metre medley relay Women's 4 x 200 metre freestyle relay	24 June; 27 June; 23 June; 25 June; 27 June
Hannah Featherstone	Silver; Silver; Bronze; Bronze	Swimming	Mixed's 4 x 100 metre freestyle relay Mixed 4 x 100 metre medley relay Women's 4 x 100 metre medley relay Women's 4 x 200 metre freestyle relay	23 June; 27 June; 25 June; 27 June
Luke Davies	Silver; Silver; Bronze	Swimming	Mixed 4 x 100 metre freestyle relay Men's 4 x 100 metre medley relay Men's 200 metre breaststroke	26 June; 27 June; 24 June
Charlie Attwood	Silver; Silver; Bronze	Swimming	Mixed 4 x 100 metre freestyle relay Men's 4 x 100 metre medley relay Men's 100 metre breaststroke	26 June; 27 June; 27 June
Amelia Clynes	Silver; Silver; Bronze	Swimming	Women's 100 metre butterfly Mixed 4 x 100 metre medley relay Women's 4 x 100 metre medley relay	26 June; 27 June; 25 June
Kyle Chisholm	Silver; Silver	Swimming	Men's 4 x 200 metre freestyle relay Men's 4 x 100 metre freestyle relay	26 June; 27 June
Darcy Deakin	Silver; Bronze; Bronze; Bronze	Swimming	Mixed 4 x 100 metre freestyle relay Women's 4 x 100 metre freestyle relay Women's 4 x 100 metre medley relay Women's 4 x 200 metre freestyle relay	24 June; 23 June; 25 June; 27 June
Madeleine Crompton	Silver; Bronze; Bronze	Swimming	Mixed 4 x 100 metre freestyle relay Women's 4 x 100 metre freestyle relay Women's 4 x 200 metre freestyle relay	24 June; 23 June; 27 June
Ryan Bartlett	Bronze; Bronze; Bronze	Gymnastics	Mixed acrobatics pair all-around Mixed acrobatics pair dynamic Mixed acrobatics pair balance	19 June; 21 June; 21 June
Hannah Baughn	Bronze; Bronze; Bronze	Gymnastics	Mixed acrobatics pair all-around Mixed acrobatics pair dynamic Mixed acrobatics pair balance	19 June; 21 June; 21 June
Layla Black	Bronze; Bronze	Swimming	Women's 200 metre breaststroke Women's 4 x 100 metre medley relay	25 June; 25 June
