= Luxembourg at the European Games =

- IOC code: LUX
- NOC: Luxembourg Olympic and Sporting Committee
- Website: teamletzebuerg.lu (in French)
- Medals Ranked 41st: Gold 0 Silver 2 Bronze 3 Total 5

European Games appearances (overview)
- 2015; 2019; 2023; 2027

Luxembourg participated at the inaugural edition of the European Games in 2015. However, Luxembourg was one of the eight nations that failed to win a medal at the inaugural European Games.

== Medal tables ==
=== Medals by Games ===
Games	Athletes	Gold	Silver	Bronze	Total	Rank
(Azerbaijan) 2015 Baku	65	0	0	0	0	–
(Belarus) 2019 Minsk	24	0	1	2	3	38
(Poland) 2023 Kraków	60	0	1	1	2	38
(Turkey) 2027 Istanbul	Future event					
Total		0	2	3	5	41

=== Medals by sport ===
Sport	Gold	Silver	Bronze	Total
Archery	0	1	0	1
Athletics	0	1	0	1
Karate	0	0	2	2
Table tennis	0	0	1	1
Totals (4 entries)	0	2	3	5

== List of medallists ==
Medal	Name(s)	Games	Sport	Event
Silver	Gilles Seywert	(Belarus) 2019 Minsk	Archery	Men's individual compound
Bronze	Jennifer Warling	(Belarus) 2019 Minsk	Karate	Women's kumite 55 kg
Bronze	Ni Xialian	(Belarus) 2019 Minsk	Table tennis	Women's singles
Silver	Vera Hoffmann	(Poland) 2023 Kraków	Athletics	Women's 1500 m
Bronze	Jennifer Warling	(Poland) 2023 Kraków	Karate	Women's kumite 55 kg

== See also ==
- Luxembourg at the Olympics
