= Montenegro at the European Games =

- IOC code: MNE
- NOC: Montenegrin Olympic Committee
- Website: www.cok.me (in Montenegrin)
- Medals: Gold 0 Silver 1 Bronze 1 Total 2

European Games appearances (overview)
- 2015; 2019; 2023; 2027

Montenegro participated at the inaugural edition of the European Games in 2015 and in the following 2019 and 2023 games.

== Medal tables ==
=== Medals by Games ===
Games	Athletes	Gold	Silver	Bronze	Total	Rank
(Azerbaijan) 2015 Baku	55	0	0	1	1	40
(Belarus) 2019 Minsk	10	0	1	0	1	39
(Poland) 2023 Kraków-Małopolska	40	0	0	0	0	-
(Turkey) 2027 Istanbul	Future event					
Total		0	1	1	2	45

=== Medals by sports ===
Sport	Gold	Silver	Bronze	Total
Karate	0	1	1	2
Totals (1 entries)	0	1	1	2

== List of medallists ==
Medal	Name(s)	Games	Sport	Event
Bronze	Marina Raković	(Azerbaijan) 2015 Baku	Karate	Women's 68kg
Silver	Mario Hodžić	(Belarus) 2019 Minsk	Karate	Men's kumite 67 kg

== See also ==
- Montenegro at the Olympics
