= Estonia at the European Games =

- IOC code: EST
- NOC: Estonian Olympic Committee
- Website: www.eok.ee
- Medals Ranked 36th: Gold 2 Silver 4 Bronze 5 Total 11

European Games appearances (overview)
- 2015; 2019; 2023; 2027

Estonia has competed at the European Games since the inaugural 2015 Games.

== European Games ==
=== Medals by Games ===
Games	Athletes	Gold	Silver	Bronze	Total	Rank
(Azerbaijan) 2015 Baku	59	0	1	2	3	33
(Belarus) 2019 Minsk	68	0	2	3	4	35
(Poland) 2023 Kraków	105	2	1	0	3	31
(Turkey) 2027 Istanbul	Future event					
Total		2	4	5	11	36

== Medalists ==
Medal	Name	Games	Sport	Event
Silver	Julia Beljajeva; Irina Embrich; Erika Kirpu; Katrina Lehis	(Azerbaijan) 2015 Baku	Fencing	Women's team épée
Bronze	Heiki Nabi	(Azerbaijan) 2015 Baku	Wrestling	Men's Greco-Roman 130 kg
Bronze	Erika Kirpu	(Azerbaijan) 2015 Baku	Fencing	Women's épée
Silver	Alo Jakin	(Belarus) 2019 Minsk	Cycling	Men's road race
Silver	Merike Anderson; Kadri-Ann Lass; Annika Köster; Janne Pulk	(Belarus) 2019 Minsk	Basketball	Women's tournament
Bronze	Epp Mäe	(Belarus) 2019 Minsk	Wrestling	Women's freestyle 76 kg
Bronze	Raul Must	(Belarus) 2019 Minsk	Badminton	Men's singles
Bronze	Pavel Artamonov	(Belarus) 2019 Minsk	Karate	Men's kumite 75 kg
Gold	Robin Jäätma; Lisell Jäätma	(Poland) 2023 Kraków	Archery	Mixed team compound
Gold	Astrid Johanna Grents	(Poland) 2023 Kraków	Muaythai	Women's 60 kg
Silver	Rasmus Mägi	(Poland) 2023 Kraków	Athletics	400 m hurdles

=== By sport ===
Sport	Gold	Silver	Bronze	Total
Archery	1	0	0	1
Muaythai	1	0	0	1
Fencing	0	1	1	2
Athletics	0	1	0	1
Basketball	0	1	0	1
Cycling	0	1	0	1
Wrestling	0	0	2	2
Badminton	0	0	1	1
Karate	0	0	1	1
Totals (9 entries)	2	4	5	11

== See also ==
- Estonia at the Olympics
- Estonia at the Youth Olympics
