= Slovenia at the European Games =

- IOC code: SLO
- NOC: Olympic Committee of Slovenia
- Website: www.olympic.si
- Medals: Gold 8 Silver 10 Bronze 6 Total 24

European Games appearances (overview)
- 2015; 2019; 2023; 2027

Slovenia participated at the inaugural edition of the European Games in 2015.

== Medal tables ==
=== Medals by Games ===
Games	Athletes	Gold	Silver	Bronze	Total	Rank
(Azerbaijan) 2015 Baku	81	1	1	3	5	30
(Belarus) 2019 Minsk	72	4	1	1	6	14
(Poland) 2023 Kraków-Małopolska	143	3	8	2	13	20
(Turkey) 2027 Istanbul	Future event					
Total		8	10	6	24	23

=== Medals by sports ===
Sport	Gold	Silver	Bronze	Total
Athletics	2	2	0	4
Gymnastics	2	0	0	2
Kickboxing	1	3	0	4
Ski jumping	1	2	1	4
Judo	1	1	4	6
Archery	1	0	0	1
Karate	0	1	0	1
Taekwondo	0	1	0	1
Sport climbing	0	0	1	1
Totals (9 entries)	8	10	6	24

== List of medalists ==
Medal	Name(s)	Games	Sport	Event
Gold	Sašo Bertoncelj	(Azerbaijan) 2015 Baku	Gymnastics	Pommel horse
Silver	Tina Trstenjak	(Azerbaijan) 2015 Baku	Judo	Women's 63 kg
Bronze	Rok Drakšič	(Azerbaijan) 2015 Baku	Judo	Men's 73 kg
Bronze	Anamari Velenšek	(Azerbaijan) 2015 Baku	Judo	Women's 78 kg
Bronze	Klara Apotekar; Vlora Bedeti; Nina Milošević; Petra Nareks; Anka Pogacnik; Tina Trstenjak; Anamari Velenšek; Kristina Vrsic	(Azerbaijan) 2015 Baku	Judo	Women's team

== See also ==
- Slovenia at the Olympics
