= Turkey at the European Games =

- IOC code: TUR
- NOC: Turkish Olympic Committee
- Website: www.olimpiyatkomitesi.org.tr
- Medals: Gold 17 Silver 19 Bronze 46 Total 82

European Games appearances (overview)
- 2015; 2019; 2023; 2027

Turkey participated in the inaugural edition of the European Games in 2015.

== Medal tables ==
=== Medals by Games ===
Host country

Games	Athletes	Gold	Silver	Bronze	Total	Rank
(Azerbaijan) 2015 Baku	191	6	4	19	29	14
(Belarus) 2019 Minsk	110	2	6	7	15	24
(Poland) 2023 Krakow	193	9	9	20	38	9
(Turkey) 2027 Istanbul	Future event					
Total	494	17	19	46	82	13
Total Games		707	706	955	2,368	-

Turkey gain 82 medals of 2,368 medals.

=== European Championships ===
Games	Athletes	Gold	Silver	Bronze	Total	Rank
(United Kingdom) 2018	104	1	3	2	6	22
(Germany) 2022	73	1	4	3	8	24
Total	177	2	7	5	14	25
Total Games		363	362	365	1,090	-

Turkey gain 14 medals of 1,090 medals.

=== European Para Championships ===
2023 European Para Championships

2027 European Para Championships

=== Medals by sports ===
Sport	Gold	Silver	Bronze	Total
Karate	4	7	10	21
Boxing	3	1	5	9
Wrestling	2	2	9	13
Muaythai	2	2	2	6
Taekwondo	2	1	4	7
Shooting	1	2	1	4
Judo	1	1	1	3
Kickboxing	1	0	3	4
Volleyball	1	0	0	1
Athletics	0	2	3	5
Gymnastics	0	1	2	3
Archery	0	0	3	3
Artistic swimming	0	0	1	1
Badminton	0	0	1	1
Table tennis	0	0	1	1
Totals (15 entries)	17	19	46	82

== List of medallists ==
Medal	Name(s)	Games	Sport	Event
Gold	Serap Özçelik	(Azerbaijan) 2015 Baku	Karate	Women's 50 kg
Gold	Burak Uygur	(Azerbaijan) 2015 Baku	Karate	Men's 67 kg
Gold	Enes Erkan	(Azerbaijan) 2015 Baku	Karate	Men's 84+ kg
Gold	Rıza Kayaalp	(Azerbaijan) 2015 Baku	Wrestling	Men's Greco-Roman 130 kg
Gold	Taha Akgül	(Azerbaijan) 2015 Baku	Wrestling	Men's freestyle 125 kg
Gold	Women's national volleyball team: Merve Dalbeler Gizem Güreşen Karadayı Dicle Nur Babat Kübra Akman Polen Uslupehlivan Seda Aslanyürek Büşra Cansu Güldeniz Önal Paşalıoğlu Naz Aydemir Akyol Neriman Özsoy Gözde Yılmaz Meliha İsmailoğlu Aslı Kalaç Çağla Akın	(Azerbaijan) 2015 Baku	Volleyball	Women's tournament
Gold	Mikail Özerler	(Belarus) 2019 Minsk	Judo	Men's 90 kg
Gold	Buse Naz Çakıroğlu	(Belarus) 2019 Minsk	Boxing	Women's 51 kg
Gold	Buse Naz Çakıroğlu	(Poland) 2023 Kraków	Boxing	Women's 50 kg
Gold	Busenaz Sürmeneli	(Poland) 2023 Kraków	Boxing	Women's 66 kg
Gold	Sude Yaren Uzunçavdar	(Poland) 2023 Kraków	Taekwondo	Women's 73 kg
Gold	Nafia Kuş	(Poland) 2023 Kraków	Taekwondo	Women's +73 kg
Gold	Eray Şamdan	(Poland) 2023 Kraków	Karate	Men's 60 kg
Gold	Gülistan Turan	(Poland) 2023 Kraków	Muaythai	Women's 51 kg
Gold	Bediha Tacyıldız	(Poland) 2023 Kraków	Muaythai	Women's 63.5 kg
Gold	Emine Arslan	(Poland) 2023 Kraków	Kickboxing	Women's Full Contact 52 kg
Gold	İsmail Keleş	(Poland) 2023 Kraków	Shooting	Men's 10 meter air pistol
Silver	Merve Çoban	(Azerbaijan) 2015 Baku	Karate	Women's 61 kg
Silver	Meltem Hocaoğlu	(Azerbaijan) 2015 Baku	Karate	Women's 68+ kg
Silver	Ebru Şahin	(Azerbaijan) 2015 Baku	Judo	Women's 48 kg
Silver	Soner Demirtaş	(Azerbaijan) 2015 Baku	Wrestling	Men's freestyle 74 kg
Silver	Soner Demirtaş	(Belarus) 2019 Minsk	Wrestling	Men's freestyle 74 kg
Silver	Ali Sofuoğlu	(Belarus) 2019 Minsk	Karate	Men's individual kata
Silver	Uğur Aktaş	(Belarus) 2019 Minsk	Karate	Men's kumite 84 kg
Silver	Serap Özçelik	(Belarus) 2019 Minsk	Karate	Women's kumite 50 kg
Silver	Meltem Hocaoğlu	(Belarus) 2019 Minsk	Karate	Women's kumite +68 kg
Silver	Ahmet Önder	(Belarus) 2019 Minsk	Gymnastics	Artistic Gymnastics, Horizontal Bar
Silver	Ali Sofuoğlu	(Poland) 2023 Kraków	Karate	Men's individual kata
Silver	Merve Dinçel	(Poland) 2023 Kraków	Taekwondo	Women's 49 kg
Silver	Necati Er	(Poland) 2023 Kraków	Athletics	Men's triple jump
Silver	Tuğba Danışmaz	(Poland) 2023 Kraków	Athletics	Women's triple jump
Silver	Sercan Koç	(Poland) 2023 Kraków	Muaythai	Men's 60 kg
Silver	Kübra Kocakuş	(Poland) 2023 Kraków	Muaythai	Women's 60 kg
Silver	Samet Gümüş	(Poland) 2023 Kraków	Boxing	Men's 51 kg
Silver	İsmail Keleş; Yusuf Dikeç; Buğra Selimzade	(Poland) 2023 Kraków	Shooting	Men's team 10 metre air pistol
Silver	Dilara Bedia Kızılsu; Rümeysa Pelin Kaya; Safiye Temizdemir	(Poland) 2023 Kraków	Shooting	Women's team trap
Bronze	Erman Eltemur	(Azerbaijan) 2015 Baku	Karate	Men's 75 kg
Bronze	Cenk İldem	(Azerbaijan) 2015 Baku	Wrestling	Men's Greco-Roman 98 kg
Bronze	Dilara Bozan	(Azerbaijan) 2015 Baku	Karate	Women's Kata
Bronze	Uğur Aktaş	(Azerbaijan) 2015 Baku	Karate	Men's 84 kg
Bronze	Mehmet Yakan	(Azerbaijan) 2015 Baku	Karate	Men's Kata
Bronze	Metehan Başar	(Azerbaijan) 2015 Baku	Wrestling	Men's Greco-Roman 85 kg
Bronze	Merve Kenger	(Azerbaijan) 2015 Baku	Wrestling	Women's freestyle 53 kg
Bronze	Elif Jale Yeşilırmak	(Azerbaijan) 2015 Baku	Wrestling	Women's freestyle 58 kg
Bronze	Sezar Akgül	(Azerbaijan) 2015 Baku	Wrestling	Men's freestyle 57 kg
Bronze	Mustafa Kaya	(Azerbaijan) 2015 Baku	Wrestling	Men's freestyle 65 kg
Bronze	Yakup Gör	(Azerbaijan) 2015 Baku	Wrestling	Men's freestyle 70 kg
Bronze	Melek Hu	(Azerbaijan) 2015 Baku	Table tennis	Women's singles
Bronze	Nur Tatar	(Azerbaijan) 2015 Baku	Taekwondo	Women's 67 kg
Bronze	İbrahim Çolak	(Azerbaijan) 2015 Baku	Gymnastics	Men's rings
Bronze	Abdullah Ömer Alimoğlu	(Azerbaijan) 2015 Baku	Shooting	Men's 50 metre pistol
Bronze	Elif Nur Coşkun	(Azerbaijan) 2015 Baku	Boxing	Women's 51 kg
Bronze	Muhammed Unlu	(Azerbaijan) 2015 Baku	Boxing	Men's 49 kg
Bronze	Özge Bayrak; Neslihan Yiğit	(Azerbaijan) 2015 Baku	Badminton	Women's doubles
Bronze	Belkıs Zehra Kaya	(Azerbaijan) 2015 Baku	Judo	Women's +78 kg
Bronze	Yeşim Bostan; Evren Çağıran	(Belarus) 2019 Minsk	Archery	Mixed team compound
Bronze	Jak Ali Harvey	(Belarus) 2019 Minsk	Athletics	Men's 100 m
Bronze	Ferhat Arıcan	(Belarus) 2019 Minsk	Gymnastics	Men's parallel bars
Bronze	Dilara Bozan	(Belarus) 2019 Minsk	Karate	Women's individual kata
Bronze	Merve Çoban	(Belarus) 2019 Minsk	Karate	Women's kumite 61 kg
Bronze	Evin Demirhan	(Belarus) 2019 Minsk	Wrestling	Women's 50 kg
Bronze	Süleyman Atlı	(Belarus) 2019 Minsk	Wrestling	Men's 57 kg
Bronze	Serap Özçelik	(Poland) 2023 Kraków	Karate	Women's 50 kg
Bronze	Tuba Yakan	(Poland) 2023 Kraków	Karate	Women's 55 kg
Bronze	Gülbahar Gözütok	(Poland) 2023 Kraków	Karate	Women's 61 kg
Bronze	Erman Eltemur	(Poland) 2023 Kraków	Karate	Men's 75 kg
Bronze	Hatice Kübra İlgün	(Poland) 2023 Kraków	Taekwondo	Women's 57 kg
Bronze	Hüseyin Kartal	(Poland) 2023 Kraków	Taekwondo	Men's 80 kg
Bronze	Emre Kutalmış Ateşli	(Poland) 2023 Kraków	Taekwondo	Men's +87 kg
Bronze	Tuğrulhan Erdemir	(Poland) 2023 Kraków	Boxing	Men's 71 kg
Bronze	Hatice Akbaş	(Poland) 2023 Kraków	Boxing	Women's 54 kg
Bronze	Gizem Özer	(Poland) 2023 Kraków	Boxing	Women's 60 kg
Bronze	Funda Güleç	(Poland) 2023 Kraków	Kickboxing	Women's Point Fighting 60 kg
Bronze	Recep Men	(Poland) 2023 Kraków	Kickboxing	Men's Light Contact 79 kg
Bronze	Cevat Kır	(Poland) 2023 Kraków	Kickboxing	Men's Point Fighting 84 kg
Bronze	Enis Yunusoğlu	(Poland) 2023 Kraków	Muaythai	Men's 81 kg
Bronze	Ezgi Keleş	(Poland) 2023 Kraków	Muaythai	Women's 54 kg
Bronze	Hazal Burun	(Poland) 2023 Kraków	Archery	Women's individual compound
Bronze	Emircan Haney	(Poland) 2023 Kraków	Archery	Men's individual compound
Bronze	Mehmet Çelik	(Poland) 2023 Kraków	Athletics	Men's 800 m
Bronze	İsmail Nezir	(Poland) 2023 Kraków	Athletics	Men's 400 m hurdles
Bronze	Turkey artistic swimming team: Esmanur Yirmibeş Nil Talu Ayda Salepcioğlu Melek Andreea Akay Selin Telci İsra Yüksel Derin Aralp Ece Sokullu	(Poland) 2023 Kraków	Artistic swimming	Free combination routine

== See also ==
- Turkey at the Olympics
- European Youth Olympic Festival
- European Para Youth Games
