= Latvia at the European Games =

- IOC code: LAT
- NOC: Latvian Olympic Committee
- Website: www.olimpiade.lv
- Medals: Gold 6 Silver 5 Bronze 6 Total 17

European Games appearances (overview)
- 2015; 2019; 2023; 2027

Latvia participated at the inaugural edition of the European Games in 2015.

== Medal tables ==
=== Medals by Games ===
Games	Athletes	Gold	Silver	Bronze	Total	Rank
(Azerbaijan) 2015 Baku	67	1	0	2	3	31
(Belarus) 2019 Minsk	52	2	3	2	7	27
(Poland) 2023 Kraków-Małopolska	98	3	2	2	7	25
(Turkey) 2027 Istanbul	Future event					
Total		6	5	6	17	30

=== Medals by sports ===
Sport	Gold	Silver	Bronze	Total
Athletics	2	0	1	3
3x3 basketball	1	1	0	2
Wrestling	1	0	1	2
Karate	1	0	0	1
Volleyball	1	0	0	1
Shooting	0	2	1	3
Sambo	0	1	0	1
Sport climbing	0	1	0	1
Canoe sprint	0	0	2	2
Taekwondo	0	0	1	1
Totals (10 entries)	6	5	6	17

== List of medallists ==
Medal	Name(s)	Games	Sport	Event
Gold	Martins Plavins; Haralds Regza	(Azerbaijan) 2015 Baku	Beach Volleyball	Men's Beach Volleyball
Bronze	Anastasija Grigorjeva	(Azerbaijan) 2015 Baku	Wrestling	Women's freestyle 63 kg
Bronze	Aleksejs Rumjancevs	(Azerbaijan) 2015 Baku	Canoe sprint	Men's K-1 200 metres

== See also ==
- Latvia at the Olympics
