= Finland at the European Games =

- IOC code: FIN
- NOC: Finnish Olympic Committee
- Website: www.olympiakomitea.fi
- Medals: Gold 4 Silver 1 Bronze 7 Total 12

European Games appearances (overview)
- 2015; 2019; 2023; 2027

Finland participated at the inaugural edition of the European Games in 2015.

== Medal tables ==
=== Medals by Games ===
| Games | Athletes | Gold | Silver | Bronze | Total | Rank |
| (Azerbaijan) 2015 Baku | 100 | 0 | 0 | 1 | 1 | 40 |
| (Belarus) 2019 Minsk | 35 | 2 | 0 | 1 | 3 | 30 |
| (Poland) 2023 Kraków-Małopolska | 118 | 2 | 1 | 5 | 8 | 30 |
| (Turkey) 2027 Istanbul | Future event | | | | | |
| Total | 253 | 4 | 1 | 7 | 12 | 34 |

=== Medals by sports ===
| Sport | Gold | Silver | Bronze | Total |
|---|---|---|---|---|
| Shooting | 1 | 1 | 2 | 4 |
| Athletics | 1 | 0 | 1 | 2 |
| Boxing | 1 | 0 | 0 | 1 |
| Gymnastics | 1 | 0 | 0 | 1 |
| Muay thai | 0 | 0 | 2 | 2 |
| Karate | 0 | 0 | 1 | 1 |
| Kickboxing | 0 | 0 | 1 | 1 |
| Totals (7 entries) | 4 | 1 | 7 | 12 |

== List of medallists ==
| Medal | Name(s) | Games | Sport | Event |
|---|---|---|---|---|
| Bronze | Marko Kemppainen | (Azerbaijan) 2015 Baku | Shooting | Men's skeet |
| Gold | Emil Soravuo | (Belarus) 2019 Minsk | Gymnastics | Men's floor |
| Gold | Mira Potkonen | (Belarus) 2019 Minsk | Boxing | Women's 60 kg |
| Bronze | Titta Keinänen | (Belarus) 2019 Minsk | Karate | Women's kumite +68 kg |

== See also ==
- Finland at the Olympics
