= Albania at the European Games =

- IOC code: ALB
- NOC: Albanian National Olympic Committee
- Website: nocalbania.org.al
- Medals Ranked 37th: Gold 2 Silver 0 Bronze 0 Total 2

European Games appearances (overview)
- 2015; 2019; 2023; 2027

Albania participated at the inaugural edition of the European Games in 2015. Albania having won so far two Gold medals at the European Games. They won one Gold medal in Karate and the other one in Athletics.

== Medal tables ==
=== Medals by Games ===
Games	Athletes	Gold	Silver	Bronze	Total	Rank
(Azerbaijan) 2015 Baku	28	0	0	0	0	–
(Belarus) 2019 Minsk	13	0	0	0	0	–
(Poland) 2023 Kraków	40	2	0	0	2	32
(Turkey) 2027 Istanbul	Future event					
Total		2	0	0	2	37

=== Medals by sports ===
Sport	Gold	Silver	Bronze	Total
Athletics	1	0	0	1
Karate	1	0	0	1
Totals (2 entries)	2	0	0	2

== List of medallists ==
Medal	Name(s)	Games	Sport	Event
Gold	Alvin Karaqi	(Poland) 2023 Krakow	Karate	Men's kumite 84 kg
Gold	Luiza Gega	(Poland) 2023 Krakow	Athletics	3000 metres steeplechase

== See also ==
- Albania at the Olympics
