= Iceland at the European Games =

- IOC code: ISL
- NOC: National Olympic and Sports Association of Iceland
- Website: www.isi.is
- Medals: Gold 0 Silver 0 Bronze 0 Total 0

European Games appearances (overview)
- 2015; 2019; 2023; 2027

Iceland first participated at the European Games at the inaugural 2015 Games However, Iceland is one of four nations that have yet to win a medal at the European Games. Iceland also fielded a team for 2019, but still not opening their medal count.

== Medal tables ==
Games	Athletes	Gold	Silver	Bronze	Total	Rank
(Azerbaijan) 2015 Baku	11	0	0	0	0	-
(Belarus) 2019 Minsk	7	0	0	0	0	-
(Poland) 2023 Kraków-Małopolska	38	0	0	0	0	-
(Turkey) 2027 Istanbul	Future event					
Total		0	0	0	0	-
