= Macedonia at the 2015 European Games =

- IOC code: MKD
- NOC: Olympic Committee of North Macedonia
- Website: www.mok.org.mk

in Baku, Azerbaijan 12 – 28 June 2015
- Competitors: 54 in 4 sports
- Flag bearer: Emil Pavlov
- Medals Ranked 38th: Gold 0 Silver 0 Bronze 2 Total 2

European Games appearances (overview)
- 2015; 2019; 2023; 2027

Republic of North Macedonia competed at the 2015 European Games, in Baku, Azerbaijan from 12 to 28 June 2015.

== Medalists ==
Medal	Name	Sport	Event	Date
Bronze	Emil Pavlov	Karate	Men's 60kg	13 June
Bronze	Martin Nestorovski	Karate	Men's 84+ kg	14 June

== Athletics ==
Macedonia has qualified 50 athletes.

- Mixed team – 1 team of 50 athletes

== Gymnastics ==
Macedonia has qualified 1 athlete.

=== Artistic ===
- Men's – 1 quota place,

== Karate ==
Macedonia has qualified 2 athletes.

- Men's −60kg – 1 quota place
- Men's +84kg – 1 quota place

== Sambo ==
Macedonia has qualified 1 athlete.

- Men's +100kg – 1 quota place
