= Bosnia and Herzegovina at the European Games =

- IOC code: BIH
- NOC: Olympic Committee of Bosnia and Herzegovina
- Website: www.okbih.ba (in Bosnian)
- Medals Ranked 42nd: Gold 0 Silver 2 Bronze 0 Total 2

European Games appearances (overview)
- 2015; 2019; 2023; 2027

Bosnia and Herzegovina participated at the inaugural edition of the European Games in 2015.

== Medal tables ==
=== Medals by Games ===
Games	Athletes	Gold	Silver	Bronze	Total	Rank
(Azerbaijan) 2015 Baku	53	0	0	0	0	–
(Belarus) 2019 Minsk	16	0	1	0	1	39
(Poland) 2023 Kraków	55	0	1	0	1	39
(Turkey) 2027 Istanbul	Future event					
Total		0	2	0	2	42

=== Medals by sports ===
Sport	Gold	Silver	Bronze	Total
Judo	0	1	0	1
Taekwondo	0	1	0	1
Totals (2 entries)	0	2	0	2

== List of medallists ==
Medal	Name(s)	Games	Sport	Event
Silver	Larisa Cerić	(Belarus) 2019 Minsk	Judo	Women's +78 kg
Silver	Nedžad Husić	(Poland) 2023 Kraków	Taekwondo	Men's 74 kg

== See also ==
- Bosnia and Herzegovina at the Olympics
