= EOC Refugee Team at the European Games =

- IOC code: ERT
- NOC: European Olympic Committees
- Medals: Gold 0 Silver 0 Bronze 0 Total 0

European Games appearances (overview)
- 2015; 2019; 2023; 2027

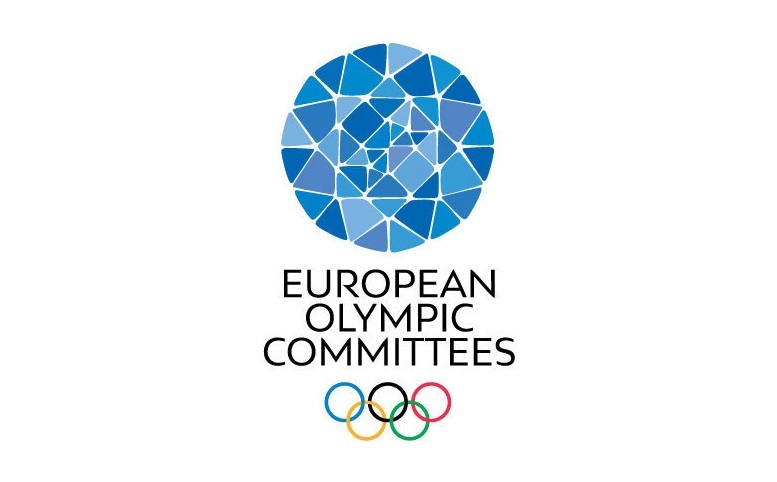
Flag used by EOC Refugee Team

An EOC Refugee Team first competed at the European Games at the 2023 edition in Kraków and Małopolska, Poland as independent Olympic participants.

== Medal tables ==
=== Medals by Games ===
Games	Athletes	Gold	Silver	Bronze	Total	Rank
(Poland) 2023 Kraków-Małopolska	4	0	0	0	0	-
(Turkey) 2027 Istanbul	Future event					
Total		0	0	0	0	-

== Flagbearers ==
European Games
Games	Athlete	Sport
(Poland) Kraków-Małopolska 2023	Cindy Ngamba; Kasra Mehdipournejad	Boxing; Taekwondo

== See also ==
- Refugee Olympic Team at the Olympics
- EOC Refugee Team at the European Youth Olympic Festival
