= Moldova at the European Games =

- IOC code: MDA
- NOC: National Olympic Committee of the Republic of Moldova
- Website: www.olympic.md
- Medals: Gold 1 Silver 2 Bronze 7 Total 10

European Games appearances (overview)
- 2015; 2019; 2023; 2027

Moldova participated at the inaugural edition of the European Games in 2015.

== Medal tables ==
=== Medals by games ===
Games	Athletes	Gold	Silver	Bronze	Total	Rank
(Azerbaijan) 2015 Baku	87	0	1	2	3	33
(Belarus) 2019 Minsk	50	0	1	4	5	36
(Poland) 2023 Kraków-Małopolska	74	1	0	1	2	35
(Turkey) 2027 Istanbul	Future event					
Total		1	2	7	10	38

=== Medals by sports ===
Sport	Gold	Silver	Bronze	Total
Muay thai	1	0	0	1
Wrestling	0	1	4	5
Sambo	0	1	2	3
Canoe sprint	0	0	1	1
Totals (4 entries)	1	2	7	10

== List of medallists ==
Medal	Name(s)	Games	Sport	Event
Silver	Piotr Ianulov	(Azerbaijan) 2015 Baku	Wrestling	Men's freestyle 86 kg
Bronze	Svetlana Saenko	(Azerbaijan) 2015 Baku	Wrestling	Women's freestyle 75 kg
Bronze	Alexandru Chirtoacă	(Azerbaijan) 2015 Baku	Wrestling	Men's freestyle 57 kg
Bronze	Victor Ciobanu	(Belarus) 2019 Minsk	Wrestling	Men's Greco-Roman 60 kg
Bronze	Anastasia Nichita	(Belarus) 2019 Minsk	Wrestling	Women's freestyle 57 kg
Bronze	Denis Tachii	(Belarus) 2019 Minsk	Sambo	Men's freestyle 100 kg
Bronze	Paulina Eșanu	(Belarus) 2019 Minsk	Sambo	Women's freestyle 52 kg
Silver	Sabina Artemciuc	(Belarus) 2019 Minsk	Sambo	Women's freestyle 60 kg

== See also ==
- Moldova at the Olympics
