= Archery at the 2015 European Games =

- Venue: Tofiq Bahramov Stadium
- Dates: 17–22 June
- Competitors: 126 from 39 nations

At the 2015 European Games in Baku, five events of archery were contested, all in the target archery format, with recurve bows. The events took place at the Tofiq Bahramov Stadium over seven days of competition. The European Games format followed that of the Olympic Games with 64 men and 64 women competing in the recurve division, in individual and team events as well as in mixed team.

== Qualification ==
A total of 128 athletes will compete at the Games. Each National Olympic Committee (NOC) is permitted to enter a maximum of six competitors, three per gender. NOCs that qualified teams for a particular gender were able to send a three-member team to the team event and also have each member compete in the individual event. Six places will be reserved for Azerbaijan as the host nation, on the condition that they enter three athletes per gender at the 2014 European Championships. There will a total of five medal events and a capacity of 3,400. Archery will also offer the opportunity to win ranking points for Rio 2016 Summer Olympics qualification.

== Medal summary ==
Event	Gold	Silver	Bronze
Men's Individual	Miguel Alvariño; Spain	Sjef van den Berg; Netherlands	Anton Prilepov; Belarus
Men's Team	Ukraine; Heorhiy Ivanytskyy; Markiyan Ivashko; Viktor Ruban	Spain; Miguel Alvariño; Juan Ignacio Rodríguez; Antonio Fernández	Netherlands; Rick van der Ven; Sjef van den Berg; Mitch Dielemans
Women's Individual	Karina Winter; Germany	Maja Jager; Denmark	Alicia Marín; Spain
Women's Team	Italy; Natalia Valeeva; Guendalina Sartori; Elena Tonetta	Belarus; Hanna Marusava; Ekaterina Timofeyeva; Alena Tolkach	Ukraine; Lidiia Sichenikova; Veronika Marchenko; Anastasia Pavlova
Mixed Team	Italy; Natalia Valeeva; Mauro Nespoli	Georgia; Khatuna Narimanidze; Lasha Pkhakadze	Ukraine; Lidiia Sichenikova; Heorhiy Ivanytskyy

== Medal table ==
Rank	Nation	Gold	Silver	Bronze	Total
1	Italy (ITA)	2	0	0	2
2	Spain (ESP)	1	1	1	3
3	Ukraine (UKR)	1	0	2	3
4	Germany (GER)	1	0	0	1
5	Belarus (BLR)	0	1	1	2
5	Netherlands (NED)	0	1	1	2
7	Denmark (DEN)	0	1	0	1
7	Georgia (GEO)	0	1	0	1
Totals (8 entries)		5	5	5	15
