= Karate at the 2015 European Games – Men's kumite 60 kg =

Men's kumite 60 kg at the 2015 European Games
- Venue: Baku Crystal Hall
- Date: 13 June
- Competitors: 8 from 8 nations

Medalists
gold medal	Firdovsi Farzaliyev	Azerbaijan
silver medal	Luca Maresca	Italy
bronze medal	Emil Pavlov	Macedonia

The men's kumite 60 kg competition at the 2015 European Games in Baku, Azerbaijan was held on 13 June 2015 at the Crystal Hall.

== Schedule ==
All times are Azerbaijan Summer Time (UTC+5).

Date	Time	Event
Saturday, 13 June 2015	11:00	Elimination Round
Saturday, 13 June 2015	16:00	Semifinals
Saturday, 13 June 2015	18:00	Finals

== Results ==
Legend

- KK — Forfeit (Kiken)

=== Elimination round ===
==== Group A ====
Athlete	Pld	W	D	L	Points		
Athlete	Pld	W	D	L	GF	GA	Diff
Firdovsi Farzaliyev (AZE)	3	3	0	0	12	2	+10
Luca Maresca (ITA)	3	2	0	1	12	5	+7
Matías Gómez (ESP)	3	1	0	2	11	4	+7
Halil Marqeshi (ALB)	3	0	0	3	0	24	-24

	Score	
Luca Maresca (ITA)	8–0	Halil Marqeshi (ALB)
Matías Gómez (ESP)	0–2	Firdovsi Farzaliyev (AZE)
Luca Maresca (ITA)	2–4	Firdovsi Farzaliyev (AZE)
Matías Gómez (ESP)	10–0	Halil Marqeshi (ALB)
Halil Marqeshi (ALB)	0–6	Firdovsi Farzaliyev (AZE)
Luca Maresca (ITA)	2–1	Matías Gómez (ESP)

==== Group B ====
Athlete	Pld	W	D	L	Points		
Athlete	Pld	W	D	L	GF	GA	Diff
Marko Antić (SRB)	3	2	1	0	3	0	+3
Emil Pavlov (MKD)	3	1	2	0	2	1	+1
Evgeny Plakhutin (RUS)	3	0	2	1	0	2	-2
Sofiane Agoudjil (FRA)	3	0	1	2	1	3	-2

	Score	
Sofiane Agoudjil (FRA)	0–1	Marko Antić (SRB)
Evgeny Plakhutin (RUS)	0–0	Emil Pavlov (MKD)
Sofiane Agoudjil (FRA)	1–2	Emil Pavlov (MKD)
Evgeny Plakhutin (RUS)	0–2	Marko Antić (SRB)
Marko Antić (SRB)	0–0	Emil Pavlov (MKD)
Sofiane Agoudjil (FRA)	0–0	Evgeny Plakhutin (RUS)

=== Finals ===
Semifinals
Firdovsi Farzaliyev (AZE)	8
Emil Pavlov (MKD)	0
Luca Maresca (ITA)	6
Marko Antić (SRB)	2

Gold medal match
Firdovsi Farzaliyev (AZE)	4
Luca Maresca (ITA)	0
Bronze medal match
Emil Pavlov (MKD)	2
Marko Antić (SRB)	0
