= Karate at the 2015 European Games – Men's kumite +84 kg =

Karate competition

Men's kumite +84 kg at the 2015 European Games
- Venue: Baku Crystal Hall
- Date: 14 June
- Competitors: 8 from 8 nations

Medalists
gold medal	Enes Erkan	Turkey
silver medal	Jonathan Horne	Germany
bronze medal	Martin Nestorovski	Macedonia

The men's kumite +84 kg competition at the 2015 European Games in Baku, Azerbaijan was held on 14 June 2015 at the Crystal Hall.

== Schedule ==
All times are Azerbaijan Summer Time (UTC+5).

Date	Time	Event
Sunday, 14 June 2015	11:00	Elimination Round
Sunday, 14 June 2015	16:00	Semifinals
Sunday, 14 June 2015	18:00	Finals

== Results ==
Legend

- KK — Forfeit (Kiken)

=== Elimination round ===
==== Group A ====
Athlete	Pld	W	D	L	Points		
Athlete	Pld	W	D	L	GF	GA	Diff
Jonathan Horne (GER)	3	3	0	0	12	0	+12
Slobodan Bitević (SRB)	3	2	0	1	3	4	-1
Moreno Sheppard (NED)	3	1	0	2	4	4	0
Felipe Reis (POR)	3	0	0	3	1	12	-11

	Score	
Slobodan Bitević (SRB)	2–1	Felipe Reis (POR)
Jonathan Horne (GER)	3–0	Moreno Sheppard (NED)
Slobodan Bitević (SRB)	1–0	Moreno Sheppard (NED)
Jonathan Horne (GER)	6–9	Felipe Reis (POR)
Felipe Reis (POR)	0–4	Moreno Sheppard (NED)
Slobodan Bitević (SRB)	0–3	Jonathan Horne (GER)

==== Group B ====
Athlete	Pld	W	D	L	Points		
Athlete	Pld	W	D	L	GF	GA	Diff
Enes Erkan (TUR)	3	3	0	0	21	0	+21
Martin Nestorovski (MKD)	3	1	1	1	5	6	-1
Spyridon Margaritopoulos (GRE)	3	1	1	1	2	8	-6
Shahin Atamov (AZE)	3	0	0	3	4	17	-7

	Score	
Enes Erkan (TUR)	10–0	Shahin Atamov (AZE)
Martin Nestorovski (MKD)	0–0	Spyridon Margaritopoulos (GRE)
Enes Erkan (TUR)	8–0	Spyridon Margaritopoulos (GRE)
Martin Nestorovski (MKD)	5–2	Shahin Atamov (AZE)
Shahin Atamov (AZE)	0–2	Spyridon Margaritopoulos (GRE)
Enes Erkan (TUR)	3–0	Martin Nestorovski (MKD)

=== Finals ===
Semifinals
Jonathan Horne (GER)	5
Martin Nestorovski (MKD)	0
Slobodan Bitević (SRB)	1
Enes Erkan (TUR)	2

Gold medal match
Jonathan Horne (GER)	1
Enes Erkan (TUR)	2
Bronze medal match
Martin Nestorovski (MKD)	8
Slobodan Bitević (SRB)	0
