= Norway at the European Games =

- IOC code: NOR
- NOC: Norwegian Olympic and Paralympic Committee and Confederation of Sports
- Website: www.idrettsforbundet.no
- Medals: Gold 6 Silver 4 Bronze 9 Total 19

European Games appearances (overview)
- 2015; 2019; 2023; 2027

Norway participated at the inaugural edition of the European Games in 2015.

== Medal tables ==
=== Medals by Games ===
Games	Athletes	Gold	Silver	Bronze	Total	Rank
(Azerbaijan) 2015 Baku	57	0	0	2	2	38
(Belarus) 2019 Minsk	39	0	0	2	2	42
(Poland) 2023 Kraków-Małopolska	143	6	4	5	15	16
Total		6	4	9	19	31

=== Medals by sports ===
Sport	Gold	Silver	Bronze	Total
Triathlon	3	0	0	3
Shooting	2	1	2	5
Athletics	1	0	1	2
Kickboxing	0	1	2	3
Ski jumping	0	1	0	1
Taekwondo	0	1	0	1
Wrestling	0	0	3	3
Fencing	0	0	1	1
Totals (8 entries)	6	4	9	19

== List of medallists ==
Medal	Name(s)	Games	Sport	Event
Bronze	Grace Bullen	(Azerbaijan) 2015 Baku	Wrestling	Women's freestyle 58 kg
Bronze	Bartosz Piasecki	(Azerbaijan) 2015 Baku	Fencing	Men's individual épée
Bronze	Felix Baldauf	(Belarus) 2019 Minsk	Wrestling	Men's Greco-Roman 97 kg
Bronze	Iselin Moen Solheim	(Belarus) 2019 Minsk	Wrestling	Women's freestyle 76 kg

== See also ==
- Norway at the Olympics
