= Karate at the 2015 European Games =

Karate competition

- Venue: Crystal Hall, Baku
- Dates: 13–14 June
- Competitors: 96 (48 men, 48 women) from 38 nations

Karate competitions at the 2015 European Games in Baku were held from 13 to 14 June 2015 at the Crystal Hall complex in Baku. The competition consisted of twelve events, six in each gender - two Kata or technique events, and ten weighted kumite or combat events.

== Qualification ==
Each National Olympic Committee will be allowed a maximum of 1 competitor per event. Each event will consist of eight competitors

Qualification will be based on the 2015 European Karate Championships between 19 and 22 March 2015 in Istanbul, Turkey; the first six finishers in each event qualify for the European Games. Hosts Azerbaijan will be awarded an entry in each event. In addition, 12 'Universality' places will be allocated, one in each event, to ensure a spread of nations can compete.

== Medal table ==
* Host nation (Azerbaijan)

Rank	Nation	Gold	Silver	Bronze	Total
1	Azerbaijan*	4	0	2	6
2	Turkey	3	2	4	9
3	France	2	2	1	5
4	Spain	2	0	0	2
5	Croatia	1	1	1	3
6	Italy	0	3	0	3
7	Austria	0	2	0	2
8	Germany	0	1	0	1
8	Greece	0	1	0	1
10	Macedonia	0	0	2	2
11	Montenegro	0	0	1	1
11	Russia	0	0	1	1
Totals (12 entries)		12	12	12	36

== Medalists ==
=== Men ===
Event	Gold	Silver	Bronze
Individual Kata	Damián Quintero; Spain	Mattia Busato; Italy	Mehmet Yakan; Turkey
Kumite -60 kg	Firdovsi Farzaliyev; Azerbaijan	Luca Maresca; Italy	Emil Pavlov; Macedonia
Kumite -67 kg	Burak Uygur; Turkey	Steven Da Costa; France	Niyazi Aliyev; Azerbaijan
Kumite -75 kg	Rafael Aghayev; Azerbaijan	Luigi Busà; Italy	Erman Eltemur; Turkey
Kumite -84 kg	Aykhan Mamayev; Azerbaijan	Michail Georgos Tzanos; Greece	Uğur Aktaş; Turkey
Kumite +84 kg	Enes Erkan; Turkey	Jonathan Horne; Germany	Martin Nestorovski; Macedonia

=== Women ===
Event	Gold	Silver	Bronze
Individual Kata	Sandra Sánchez; Spain	Sandy Scordo; France	Dilara Bozan; Turkey
Kumite -50 kg	Serap Özçelik; Turkey	Bettina Plank; Austria	Alexandra Recchia; France
Kumite -55 kg	Emily Thouy; France	Jelena Kovačević; Croatia	Ilaha Qasimova; Azerbaijan
Kumite -61 kg	Lucie Ignace; France	Merve Çoban; Turkey	Ana Lenard; Croatia
Kumite -68 kg	Irina Zaretska; Azerbaijan	Alisa Buchinger; Austria	Marina Raković; Montenegro
Kumite +68 kg	Maša Martinović; Croatia	Meltem Hocaoğlu; Turkey	Ivanna Zaytseva; Russia

== Participating nations ==
- Albania (1)
- Austria (2)
- Azerbaijan (12)
- Belarus (1)
- Belgium (1)
- Bulgaria (1)
- Croatia (6)
- Cyprus (1)
- Czech Republic (1)
- Denmark (1)
- Finland (2)
- France (10)
- Georgia (1)
- Germany (5)
- Greece (3)
- Hungary (1)
- Iceland (1)
- Ireland (1)
- Italy (4)
- Kosovo (1)
- Latvia (1)
- Luxembourg (1)
- Macedonia (2)
- Montenegro (1)
- Netherlands (1)
- Norway (1)
- Poland (1)
- Portugal (1)
- Romania (1)
- Russia (2)
- Serbia (3)
- Slovakia (1)
- Slovenia (1)
- Spain (7)
- Sweden (1)
- Switzerland (1)
- Turkey (11)
- Ukraine (3)
