= 2027 European Games =

4th European Games
- Host city: Istanbul, Turkey
- Nations: 50 (expected)
- Events: 229 in 27 sports
- Opening: 16 June 2027
- Closing: 27 June 2027
- Website: 2027istanbul.org/en/

The 4th European Games (Turkish: 4. Avrupa Oyunları), also known as the 2027 European Games or Istanbul 2027 (Turkish: İstanbul 2027), is an upcoming fourth edition of the European Games planned to be held from 16 June to 27 June 2027 in Istanbul, Turkey.

== Host selection ==
In October 2022, leading officials at the European Olympic Committees (EOC) claimed that they were closing in on securing a host for the 2027 European Games. France, Portugal, and Spain had been touted as potential bidders. Split, Croatia had also expressed in interest in hosting the games.

In October 2023, Istanbul indicated its intention to host the 2027 European Games and the 2027 European Para Championships as part of its long-term ambition to host the 2036 Summer Olympics and Paralympics. A delegation from Istanbul presented its hosting plan at a meeting of the Executive Committee of the EOC on 7 February 2024 in Madrid, Spain. Following the presentation, EOC president Spyros Capralos stated that Istanbul had the necessary infrastructure to host the games, and that he was planning to visit the city to discuss the bid further. The EOC officially confirmed Istanbul as host city on 27 March 2024. A memorandum of understanding was subsequently signed by the EOC, the Istanbul Metropolitan Municipality, and the Turkish National Olympic Committee on 16 May 2024 in Rome, Italy, with the Host City Contract signed by the parties on 28 February 2025 at the 54th EOC General Assembly in Frankfurt, Germany.

== Development and preparations ==
=== Venues ===
Venues	Events	Capacity	Status
Atatürk Olympic Park	Athletics	10,000	New
Atatürk Olympic Park	Rugby Sevens	10,000	New
Başakşehir Sports Complex	Badminton	3,012	Existing
Cebeci Sport Hall	Judo	1,250	Existing, renovated
Cebeci Sport Hall	Wrestling	1,250	Existing, renovated
Silivri Shooting Center	Shooting	TBA	New
Basketball Development Center	Boxing	10,000	Existing
Outside the Eurasia Performance and Art Center	Archery	TBA	Existing with temporary stands
Outside the Eurasia Performance and Art Center	Fencing	TBA	Existing with temporary stands
Outside the Eurasia Performance and Art Center	Weightlifting	TBA	Existing with temporary stands
Galataport	Squash (finals)	TBA	Temporary
Ataköy Olympic Stadium	Aquatics (artistic swimming, swimming)	TBA	New
Sinan Erdem Dome	Gymnastics (acrobatic, aerobic, artistic, parkour, rhythmic, trampoline)	16,000	Existing
Sultanahmet Square	3x3 basketball	TBA	Temporary
Florya Beach	Coastal rowing	TBA	Temporary
Ata Sports Center	Table tennis	TBA	Existing
Haydarpaşa railway station	Sport climbing	TBA	Temporary
Maltepe Orhangazi City Park	Canoeing	TBA	Temporary
Maltepe Orhangazi City Park	Beach volleyball	TBA	Temporary
Maltepe Orhangazi City Park	Padel	TBA	Temporary
Maltepe Orhangazi City Park	Squash (preliminaries)	TBA	Temporary
TVF Burhan Felek Sport Hall	Volleyball	7,000	Existing
Burhan Felek Sports Complex	Modern pentathlon	TBA	Existing
Haldun Alagaş Sports Hall	Karate	2,468	Existing
Haldun Alagaş Sports Hall	Taekwondo	2,468	Existing
Küçüksu, Beykoz	Triathlon	TBA	Temporary
Tuzla Kafkale Sports Complex	Kickboxing	2,000	Existing
Tuzla Kafkale Sports Complex	Muaythai	2,000	Existing

== The Games ==
=== Sports ===
In 2023, European Athletics president Dobromir Karamarinov stated that plans were being made for the 2027 European Athletics Team Championships to be part of the 2027 European Games, in Istanbul.

In March 2024, it was reported that the International Cricket Council (ICC) have been in touch with the event organisers to include cricket in the 2027 European Games. Cricket will make its return to the Olympic program in the 2028 Summer Olympics in Los Angeles, and its inclusion would have acted as the European qualifiers event.

On 3 March 2025, it was announced that weightlifting was added to programme of the 2027 European Games.

In February 2026, a total of 43 qualification systems for the 2028 Summer Olympics were published by the International Olympic Committee, and the qualification systems for sports that offer direct quotas for the 2027 European Games include archery, sport climbing, modern pentathlon, shooting, squash and triathlon.

In August 2026, European Aquatics confirmed that the Aquatics program for the 2027 European Games would consist of two championships; the 2027 European U-23 Swimming Championships and the 2027 European Artistic Swimming Championships, with the latter a direct qualification event for the 2028 Summer Olympics. On 4 September 2026, European Gymnastics confirmed the gymnastics program, with all 5 disciplines that were contested in 2015 and 2019 returning, alongside the debut of parkour.

In October 2026, the EOC Executive Committee confirmed that sailing had been added to the sports programme, the first time it appears at the European Games.

2027 European Games Sports Programme
- 3x3 basketball (2)
- Aquatics (20)
  - Artistic swimming
  - Swimming
- Archery (5)
- Athletics (24)
- Badminton (5)
- Boxing (13)
- Canoeing (10)
- Coastal rowing (8)
- Fencing (12)
- Gymnastics (41)
  - Acrobatic gymnastics(2)
  - Aerobic gymnastics (6)
  - Artistic gymnastics (13)
  - Parkour (4)
  - Rhythmic gymnastics (8)
  - Trampoline gymnastics (8)
- Judo (1)
- Karate (10)
- Kickboxing (18)
- Modern pentathlon (4)
- Muaythai (8)
- Padel (3)
- Rugby sevens (2)
- Sailing (10)
- Shooting (9)
- Squash (3)
- Sport climbing (6)
- Table tennis (3)
- Taekwondo (8)
- Triathlon (3)
- Volleyball (2)
- Weightlifting (10)
- Wrestling (12)

== Participating National Olympic Committees ==
Of the 50 National Olympic Committees who are members of the European Olympic Committees all are expected to send delegations. The participation of Russia and Belarus, who were banned from the 2023 Games following the Russian invasion of Ukraine, is yet to be confirmed. A refugee team may also participate.

Participating National Olympic Committees
- Albania
- Andorra
- Armenia
- Austria
- Azerbaijan
- Belgium
- Bosnia and Herzegovina
- Bulgaria
- Croatia
- Cyprus
- Czech Republic
- Denmark
- Estonia
- Finland
- France
- Georgia
- Germany
- Great Britain
- Greece
- Hungary
- Iceland
- Ireland
- Israel
- Italy
- Kosovo
- Latvia
- Liechtenstein
- Lithuania
- Luxembourg
- Malta
- Moldova
- Monaco
- Montenegro
- Netherlands
- North Macedonia
- Norway
- Poland
- Portugal
- Romania
- San Marino
- Serbia
- Slovakia
- Slovenia
- Spain
- Sweden
- Switzerland
- Turkey (host)
- Ukraine
