= Athletics at the 2015 European Games – Results =

These are the full results of the Athletics at the 2015 European Games which took place in Baku, Azerbaijan, from 21 to 22 June at the Baku National Stadium

== Men ==
=== 100 metres ===
Wind:
Heat 1: -0.9 m/s
Heat 2: 0.0 m/s

Rank	Heat	Name	Nationality	Time	Notes	Points
1	2	Tomáš Benko	Slovakia	10.60	=SB	14
2	2	Riste Pandev	Macedonia	10.70	SB	13
3	2	Markus Fuchs	Austria	10.74		12
4	2	Vadim Ryabikhin	Azerbaijan	10.76		11
5	2	Imri Persiado	Israel	10.78		10
6	2	Luka Rakić	Montenegro	10.79		9
7	1	Nika Kartavtsev	Georgia	10.79	SB	8
8	2	Oleg Șochin	Moldova	11.08		7
9	1	Luke Bezzina	Malta	11.11	SB	6
10	1	Pol Bidaine	Luxembourg	11.12	PB	5
11	1	Sait Huseinbašić	Bosnia and Herzegovina	11.12		4
12	1	Mikel de Sa	Andorra	11.52	SB	3
13	1	Jerai Torres	AASSE ( Gibraltar)	11.91	SB	2
	1	Ardit Rrashi	Albania	DSQ		0

=== 200 metres ===
Wind:
Heat 1: -0.5 m/s
Heat 2: 0.2 m/s

Rank	Heat	Name	Nationality	Time	Notes	Points
1	2	Ján Volko	Slovakia	21.08	PB	14
2	2	Nika Kartavtsev	Georgia	21.29	PB	13
3	2	Imri Persiado	Israel	21.30	PB	12
4	2	Luka Rakić	Montenegro	21.44	NR	11
5	2	Vadim Ryabikhin	Azerbaijan	21.46	SB	10
6	1	Andrei Daranuţa	Moldova	21.50		9
7	2	Riste Pandev	Macedonia	21.67	SB	8
8	2	Ekemini Bassey	Austria	21.71		7
9	1	Borislav Dragoljević	Bosnia and Herzegovina	22.15		6
10	1	Luke Bezzina	Malta	22.40	PB	5
11	1	Mikel de Sa	Andorra	22.94	SB	4
12	1	Lionel Evora	Luxembourg	23.07	PB	3
13	1	Fabian Haldner	AASSE ( Liechtenstein)	23.49	SB	2
	1	Mario Shestani	Albania	DSQ		0

=== 400 metres ===
Rank	Heat	Name	Nationality	Time	Notes	Points
1	2	Donald Sanford	Israel	45.75	SB	14
2	2	Alexandru Babian	Moldova	47.35	PB	13
3	2	Borislav Dragoljević	Bosnia and Herzegovina	47.89	NJR	12
4	2	Mario Gebhardt	Austria	47.96	PB	11
5	2	Arif Abbasov	Azerbaijan	48.05	PB	10
6	2	Lukas Privalinec	Slovakia	48.65		9
7	1	Endrik Zilbershtein	Georgia	48.67	SB	8
8	2	Astrit Kryeziu	Albania	48.75	SB	7
9	1	Kristijan Efremov	Macedonia	48.94	SB	6
10	1	Reece Dimech	Malta	49.30	SB	5
11	1	Šćepan Ćetković	Montenegro	49.48	PB	4
12	1	Rick Horsmans	Luxembourg	50.57	PB	3
13	1	Fabian Haldner	AASSE ( Liechtenstein)	51.71	SB	2
14	1	Daniel Maciel	Andorra	56.12	PB	1

=== 800 metres ===
Rank	Name	Nationality	Time	Notes	Points
1	Amel Tuka	Bosnia and Herzegovina	1:50.16		14
2	Jozef Repčík	Slovakia	1:51.51		13
3	Ion Siuris	Moldova	1:51.91		12
4	Astrit Kryeziu	Albania	1:52.02		11
5	Mokat Petna	Israel	1:52.60	SB	10
6	Brice Etès	AASSE ( Monaco)	1:52.84	SB	9
7	Nikolaus Franzmair	Austria	1:53.13		8
8	Hakim Ibrahimov	Azerbaijan	1:53.41	PB	7
9	Pol Moya	Andorra	1:54.88		6
10	Temuri Baikievi	Georgia	1:55.50	SB	5
11	Ben Bertemes	Luxembourg	1:56.09		4
12	Matthew Croker	Malta	1:56.89	PB	3
13	Goran Ivanović	Montenegro	1:58.74	SB	2
14	Aleksandar Stojanovski	Macedonia	2:00.60	SB	1

=== 1500 metres ===
Rank	Name	Nationality	Time	Notes	Points
1	Hayle Ibrahimov	Azerbaijan	3:49.69	SB	14
2	Jozef Pelikán	Slovakia	3:51.07		13
3	Andreas Vojta	Austria	3:51.28		12
4	Ion Siuris	Moldova	3:51.52		11
5	Dušan Babić	Bosnia and Herzegovina	3:52.09		10
6	Girmaw Amare	Israel	3:55.47		9
7	Bob Bertemes	Luxembourg	3:55.66		8
8	Joe Guerra	AASSE ( San Marino)	3:58.53		7
9	Goran Ivanović	Montenegro	4:03.00	SB	6
10	Pol Moya	Andorra	4:04.55	PB	5
11	Simon Spiteri	Malta	4:07.73	PB	4
12	Tengiz Gvinjilia	Georgia	4:08.95	SB	3
13	Ilija Pajmakoski	Macedonia	4:11.05	PB	2
	Edison Muço	Albania	DSQ		0

=== 3000 metres ===
Rank	Name	Nationality	Time	Notes	Points
1	Hayle Ibrahimov	Azerbaijan	7:54.14	SB	14
2	Brenton Rowe	Austria	8:05.62	SB	13
3	Roman Prodius	Moldova	8:06.34	PB	12
4	Pol Mellina	Luxembourg	8:20.74		11
5	Jozef Pelikán	Slovakia	8:24.29	SB	10
6	Girmaw Amare	Israel	8:26.07		9
7	Joe Guerra	AASSE ( San Marino)	8:47.94	PB	8
8	Dario Mangion	Malta	8:53.75	PB	7
9	Stefan Ćuković	Bosnia and Herzegovina	8:53.93		6
10	Daviti Kharazishvili	Georgia	9:01.04	SB	5
11	Manuel Fernandes	Andorra	9:02.65	SB	4
12	Kokan Ajanovski	Macedonia	9:15.12	PB	3
13	Ilir Kellezi	Albania	9:27.12	PB	2
14	Marko Đurović	Montenegro	10:14.35	PB	1

=== 5000 metres ===
Rank	Name	Nationality	Time	Notes	Points
1	Hayle Ibrahimov	Azerbaijan	14:02.16		14
2	Roman Prodius	Moldova	14:21.42	PB	13
3	Aimeru Almeya	Israel	14:38.96		12
4	Valentin Pfeil	Austria	14:54.66	SB	11
5	Juraj Vitko	Slovakia	14:56.08	SB	10
6	Jorgo Mino	Albania	15:14.00	PB	9
7	Gigla Zilbershtein	Georgia	15:20.30	PB	8
8	Andrew Grech	Malta	15:21.13	PB	7
9	Christophe Kass	Luxembourg	15:25.21	PB	6
10	Manuel Fernandes	Andorra	15:29.56	PB	5
11	Milosh Ranchikj	Macedonia	16:09.60	PB	4
12	Dragoljub Koprivnica	Montenegro	16:17.57	PB	3
13	Srđan Samardžić	Bosnia and Herzegovina	16:36.42	PB	2

=== 3000 metres steeplechase ===
Rank	Name	Nationality	Time	Notes	Points
1	Nicolai Gorbusco	Moldova	8:49.83	PB	14
2	Christian Steinhammer	Austria	8:53.98		13
3	Osman Junuzović	Bosnia and Herzegovina	8:54.55	PB	12
4	Noam Ne'eman	Israel	9:13.64		11
5	Jorgo Mino	Albania	9:20.44	SB	10
6	Jeiran Khoperia	Georgia	9:26.03	PB	9
7	Alexander Jablokov	Slovakia	9:26.23	PB	8
8	Mark Herrera	Malta	9:41.26		7
9	Asaf Mehdiyev	Azerbaijan	9:46.39	SB	6
10	Josep Sansa	Andorra	9:50.06		5
11	Luc Scheller	Luxembourg	9:52.72	PB	4
12	Ilija Pajmakoski	Macedonia	10:26.92	PB	3
13	Goran Petrić	Montenegro	11:10.32	PB	2

=== 110 metres hurdles ===
Wind:
Heat 1: +0.1 m/s
Heat 2: +0.2 m/s

Rank	Heat	Name	Nationality	Time	Notes	Points
1	2	Dominik Siedlaczek	Austria	14.07	PB	14
2	2	Rahib Mammadov	Azerbaijan	14.22	SB	13
3	2	Mahir Kurtalić	Bosnia and Herzegovina	14.43	PB	12
4	2	Claude Godart	Luxembourg	14.49	SB	11
5	2	Tomer Almogy	Israel	14.66	SB	10
6	2	Alexandru Crușelnițchi	Moldova	14.88		9
7	1	Temo Tsiramua	Georgia	16.07	PB	8
8	2	Jakub Bottlík	Slovakia	16.41	PB	7
9	1	Aleksandar Taneski	Macedonia	17.01	PB	6
10	1	Leonard Sangra	Andorra	18.74	PB	5
	2	Darko Pešić	Montenegro	DNF		0
	1	Bradley Mifsud	Malta	DNS		0
	1	Matteo Mosconi	AASSE ( San Marino)	DNS		0

=== 400 metres hurdles ===
Rank	Heat	Name	Nationality	Time	Notes	Points
1	2	Martin Kučera	Slovakia	50.70		14
2	2	Thomas Kain	Austria	51.15	SB	13
3	2	Maor Szeged	Israel	52.18	SB	12
4	2	Andrei Daranuta	Moldova	52.89	PB	11
5	1	Rusmir Malkočević	Bosnia and Herzegovina	53.59	PB	10
6	1	Andrea Ercolani Volta	AASSE ( San Marino)	53.70	NR	9
7	2	Jacques Frisch	Luxembourg	53.89	SB	8
8	2	Ibrahim Akhmedov	Azerbaijan	53.92	SB	7
9	1	Dragan Pešić	Montenegro	55.91	PB	6
10	2	Denis Zhvania	Georgia	56.47	SB	5
11	1	Aleksandar Taneski	Macedonia	1:03.97	PB	4
12	1	Josep Sansa	Andorra	1:04.17	SB	3
	1	Neil Brimmer	Malta	DNS		0

=== 4 × 100 metres relay ===
Rank	Heat	Nation	Athletes	Time	Notes	Points
1	2	Israel	Amir Hamidulin, Dayan Aviv, Amit Cohen, Imri Persiado	40.25		14
2	2	Austria	Christoph Haslauer, Markus Fuchs, Benjamin Grill, Ekemini Bassey	40.36		13
3	2	Slovakia	Denis Danac, Roman Turcani, Ján Volko, Tomáš Benko	40.80		12
4	1	Montenegro	Luka Rakić, Bogić Vojvodić, Šćepan Ćetković, Blagota Petrićević	41.12	NR	11
5	2	Azerbaijan	Kamran Asgarov, Vadim Ryabikhin, Valentin Bulychov, Rahib Mammadov	41.25		10
6	1	Georgia	Giorgi Azarashvili, Ludvik Zilbershtein, Nika Kartavtsev, Bachana Khorava	41.35		9
7	2	Moldova	Oleg Șochin, Andrei Daranuţa, Andrei Doibani, Andrei Sturmilov	41.56		8
8	2	Bosnia and Herzegovina	Dejan Rašeta, Borislav Dragoljević, Nikola Brkić, Sait Huseinbašić	41.85		7
9	2	Luxembourg	Lionel Evora, Yoann Bebon, Olivier Boussong, Pol Bidaine	42.54		6
10	1	Andorra	Leonard Sangra, Miquel Vilchez, Mikel de Sa, Moises Miret	43.23	NR	5
11	1	AASSE; Gibraltar; Gibraltar; Liechtenstein; San Marino	Sean Collado, Jerai Torres, Fabian Haldner, Andrea Ercolani Volta	43.85		4
	1	Albania	Izmir Smajlaj, Mario Shestani, Edison Muço, Ardit Rrashi	DSQ		0
	1	Malta	Julian Mifsud, Rachid Chouhal, Luke Bezzina, Lauran Dimech	DSQ		0

=== 4 × 400 metres relay ===
Rank	Heat	Nation	Athletes	Time	Notes	Points
1	2	Slovakia	Lukáš Privalinec, Jozef Repčík, Denis Danac, Martin Kučera	3:08.80		14
2	2	Bosnia and Herzegovina	Rusmir Malkočević, Semir Avdić, Borislav Dragoljević, Amel Tuka	3:10.50		13
3	2	Israel	Donald Blair Sanford, Maor Seged, Aviv Dayan, Hai Cohen	3:11.09		12
4	2	Azerbaijan	Vadim Ryabikhn, Arif Abbasov, Elmir Jabrayilov, Hakim Ibrahimov	3:11.18		11
5	2	Moldova	Andrei Sturmilov, Bogdan Lusmanschi, Andrei Daranuta, Alexandru Babian	3:11.47		10
6	1	Georgia	Bachana Khorava, Soso Gogodze, Endrik Zilbershtein, Nika Kartavtsevi	3:15.49		9
7	2	Austria	Dominik Hufnagl, Gunther Matzinger, Thomas Peter Kain, Mario Gebhardt	3:17.37		8
8	1	Montenegro	Srđan Marić, Dragan Pešić, Milan Nikolić, Šćepan Ćetković	3:19.87		7
9	2	Luxembourg	Rick Horsmans, Jacques Frisch, Charel Gaspar, Tom Scholer	3:20.04		6
10	1	Malta	Neil Brimmer, Matthew John Croker, Simon Spiteri, Reece Dimech Alexander	3:20.54		5
11	1	Macedonia	Slave Koevski, Aleksandar Taneski, Aleksandar Stojanovski, Kristian Efremov	3:31.12		4
12	1	Andorra	Miquel Vilchez Vendrell, Pol Moya Betriu, Daniel Augusto Maciel Barbosa, Mikel De Sa Gomes	3:36.47		3
	1	Albania	Mario Shestani, Jorgo Mino, Edison Muco, Astrit Kryeziu	DNS		0
	1	AASSE; Liechtenstein; Gibraltar; Gibraltar; San Marino	Fabian Haldner, Jerai Torres, Sean Collado, Andrea Ercolani Volta	DNS		0

=== High jump ===
Rank	Name	Nationality	1.60	1.75	1.90	1.95	2.00	2.04	2.08	2.12	2.15	2.18	2.20	2.22	2.24	2.26	2.29	Mark	Notes	Points
1	Matúš Bubeník	Slovakia	–	–	–	–	o	–	o	o	o	o	x–	o	xx–	o	x	2.26	SB	14
2	Andrei Mîtîcov	Moldova	–	–	–	–	o	–	o	o	o	–	o	x–	xo	xx		2.24	=PB	13
3	Dmitry Kroyter	Israel	–	–	–	–	o	–	xo	xo	o	o	o	xx				2.20	=SB	12
4	Zurab Gogochuri	Georgia	–	–	–	–	–	o	–	o	o	–	x–	xx				2.15	=SB	11
5	Josip Kopic	Austria	–	–	–	o	o	xo	xxo	o	o	x						2.15	=PB	10
6	Eugenio Rossi	AASSE ( San Marino)	–	–	–	–	o	o	o	xxo	xo	–	–	x				2.15		9
7	Azar Ahmadov	Azerbaijan	–	–	o	–	o	o	o	xxx								2.08	PB	8
8	Charel Gaspar	Luxembourg	–	o	o	o	o	xo	xxx									2.04	PB	7
9	Samir Hodžić	Bosnia and Herzegovina	–	o	xo	xo	xx											1.95		6
10	Andrew Cassar Torreggiani	Malta	o	o	xxx													1.75	PB	4
10	Moises Miret	Andorra	o	o	xxx													1.75	PB	4
10	Dragan Pešić	Montenegro	–	o	xxx													1.75		4
13	Jovanche Jankovski	Macedonia	xo	xr	xxx													1.60	SB	2

=== Pole vault ===
Rank	Name	Nationality	2.50	3.00	3.50	4.00	4.20	4.35	4.50	4.60	4.70	4.80	4.85	4.90	4.95	5.00	5.05	5.10	5.15	5.20	5.25	Mark	Notes	Points
1	Ján Zmoray	Slovakia	–	–	–	–	–	o	–	xo	–	o	–	–	–	o	–	xo	xo	x		5.15	PB	14
2	Paul Kilbertus	Austria	–	–	–	–	–	–	–	–	xo	o	–	–	–	o	–	o	x–	xx	x	5.10	=SB	13
3	Etamar Bhastekar	Israel	–	–	–	–	–	–	–	–	–	o	–	o	–	o	–	x–	xx			5.00		12
4	Sébastien Hoffelt	Luxembourg	–	–	–	–	–	–	–	–	o	–	–	xxx								4.70		11
5	Miquel Vilchez	Andorra	–	–	–	–	–	–	xo	–	o	xxx										4.70	=SB	10
6	Stanislav Gheorghioglo	Moldova	–	–	–	–	–	xxo	–	xo	r											4.60		9
7	Darko Pešić	Montenegro	–	–	–	xo	xo	o	xr													4.35	SB	8
8	Goran Pejić	Bosnia and Herzegovina	–	–	o	xxx																3.50	SB	7
9	Giorgi Gureshidze	Georgia	–	o	xo	xxx																3.50	PB	6
10	Clayton Sheldon	Malta	o	o	xxx																	3.00	PB	5
	Shimshak Alizada	Azerbaijan	–	–	xxx																	NM		0

=== Long jump ===
Rank	Name	Nationality	#1	#2	#3	#4	Mark	Notes	Points
1	Bachana Khorava	Georgia	7.31	7.49	7.64	6.97	7.64		14
2	Izmir Smajlaj	Albania	7.40	7.52	x	5.78	7.52	SB	13
3	Dominik Distelberger	Austria	x	x	7.30	x	7.30	SB	12
4	Gilron Tsabkevich	Israel	6.87	7.07	7.16	7.14	7.16		11
5	Ian Paul Grech	Malta	x	7.13	x		7.13	PB	10
6	Tomáš Veszelka	Slovakia	x	x	7.01		7.01		9
7	Murad Ibadullayev	Azerbaijan	6.71	6.59	6.99		6.99		8
8	Darko Pešić	Montenegro	6.82	6.94	6.91		6.94	SB	7
9	Yoann Bebon	Luxembourg	6.81	6.58	6.25		6.81		6
10	Federico Gorrieri	AASSE ( San Marino)	6.79	6.57	x		6.79		5
11	Nikola Brkić	Bosnia and Herzegovina	6.76	x	6.53		6.76	SB	4
12	Slavcho Mirchevski	Macedonia	x	x	6.66		6.66	SB	3
13	Alexandr Cuharenco	Moldova	6.48	6.30	–		6.48	SB	2
14	Moises Miret	Andorra	5.14	5.86	5.19		5.86	PB	1

=== Triple jump ===
Rank	Name	Nationality	#1	#2	#3	#4	Mark	Notes	Points
1	Nazim Babayev	Azerbaijan	15.97	x	x	16.38	16.38		14
2	Vladimir Letnicov	Moldova	x	16.24	x	16.34	16.34	=SB	13
3	Tom Yakubov	Israel	15.43	15.87	15.75	15.73	15.87		12
4	Lasha Torgvaidze	Georgia	15.67	15.80	15.57	x	15.80		11
5	Izmir Smajlaj	Albania	12.68	x	15.38		15.38	SB	10
6	Martin Koch	Slovakia	15.38	x	x		15.38	SB	9
7	Roman Schmied	Austria	14.18	15.22	14.86		15.22		8
8	Ian Paul Grech	Malta	x	14.22	14.15		14.22	PB	7
9	Blagota Petrićević	Montenegro	13.88	x	r		13.88	PB	6
10	Federico Gorrieri	AASSE ( San Marino)	13.58	13.26	13.54		13.58	SB	5
11	Anes Hodžić	Bosnia and Herzegovina	13.30	12.91	13.51		13.51		4
12	Ben Kiffer	Luxembourg	13.18	12.88	11.80		13.18	PB	3
13	Moises Miret	Andorra	11.57	x	11.85		11.85	PB	2
	Slavcho Mirchevski	Macedonia					NM		0

=== Shot put ===
Rank	Name	Nationality	#1	#2	#3	#4	Mark	Notes	Points
1	Hamza Alić	Bosnia and Herzegovina	x	20.26	x	x	20.26		14
2	Ivan Emilianov	Moldova	18.76	18.54	18.60	x	18.76		13
3	Lukas Weißhaidinger	Austria	18.48	x	18.43	18.47	18.48		12
4	Bob Bertemes	Luxembourg	17.93	x	x	x	17.93		11
5	Matúš Olej	Slovakia	16.90	17.61	17.47		17.61	SB	10
6	Tomaš Djurović	Montenegro	17.57	x	x		17.57		9
7	Itamar Levi	Israel	x	16.73	17.23		17.23		8
8	Tofig Mammadov	Azerbaijan	15.45	16.71	x		16.71	PB	7
9	Adriatik Hoxha	Albania	14.60	–	–		14.60	SB	6
10	Lawrence Ransley	Malta	13.79	13.46	13.68		13.79	SB	5
11	Goga Tchikhvaria	Georgia	12.19	x	12.50		12.50	PB	4
12	Marjan Nojkovski	Macedonia	x	x	12.31		12.31	SB	3
13	Unai Olea Perez	Andorra	10.86	x	10.87		10.87	SB	2
	Simon Hasler	AASSE ( Liechtenstein)					DNS		

=== Discus throw ===
Rank	Name	Nationality	#1	#2	#3	#4	Mark	Notes	Points
1	Gerhard Mayer	Austria	x	59.48	56.85	x	59.48		14
2	Nicolai Ceban	Moldova	53.95	53.77	53.46	x	53.95		13
3	Kemal Mešić	Bosnia and Herzegovina	46.45	50.26	49.78	49.31	50.26	SB	12
4	Itamar Levi	Israel	48.50	x	50.13	48.14	50.13	SB	11
5	Tomaš Djurović	Montenegro	47.16	49.01	49.42		49.42	SB	10
6	Sven Forster	Luxembourg	x	48.54	x		48.54		9
7	Matúš Olej	Slovakia	46.08	x	47.54		47.54	SB	8
8	Ilia Martkoplishvili	Georgia	x	45.61	43.35		45.61	SB	7
9	Ismail Aliyev	Azerbaijan	x	x	41.59		41.59	PB	6
10	Mario Mifsud	Malta	39.97	x	38.90		39.97	SB	5
11	Stefan Stefanovski	Macedonia	x	37.26	37.93		37.93	PB	4
12	Unai Olea Perez	Andorra	36.40	37.58	37.31		37.58	PB	3
	Adriatik Hoxha	Albania					DNS		

=== Hammer throw ===
Rank	Name	Nationality	#1	#2	#3	#4	Mark	Notes	Points
1	Marcel Lomnický	Slovakia	69.21	75.41	75.21	x	75.41		14
2	Serghei Marghiev	Moldova	x	72.35	73.09	72.47	73.09		13
3	Benjamin Siart	Austria	55.25	54.21	56.77	x	56.77		12
4	Goga Tchikhvaria	Georgia	x	55.72	56.73		56.73	PB	11
5	Viktor Zaginaiko	Israel	x	x	56.14		56.14	SB	10
6	Steve Tonizzo	Luxembourg	45.97	x	49.65		49.65	SB	9
7	Rachid Chouhal	Malta	x	40.89	x		40.89		8
8	Borko Poznanović	Montenegro	x	38.22	37.03		38.22		7
9	Zlatan Šeranić	Bosnia and Herzegovina	36.93	x	x		36.93	SB	6
10	Rodrigo Llados	Andorra	x	35.36	35.72		35.72	SB	5
11	Dejan Angelovski	Macedonia	28.37	30.83	x		30.83	PB	4
	Dzmitry Marshin	Azerbaijan	~~69.37~~	~~72.79~~	~~67.54~~	~~71.67~~	DSQ		0

=== Javelin throw ===
Rank	Name	Nationality	#1	#2	#3	#4	Mark	Notes	Points
1	Patrik Žeňúch	Slovakia	74.89	x	71.33	72.14	74.89		14
2	Rostom Chincharauli	Georgia	x	x	71.32	69.99	71.32	SB	13
3	Alan Ferber	Israel	70.01	68.51	69.28	70.18	70.18		12
4	Adrian Mardari	Moldova	x	64.48	64.95	x	64.95		11
5	Matthias Kaserer	Austria	64.07	64.56	64.24		64.56		10
6	Antoine Wagner	Luxembourg	61.36	63.18	61.94		63.18		9
7	Bradley Mifsud	Malta	62.67	60.02	x		62.67	NJR	8
8	Dejan Mileusnić	Bosnia and Herzegovina	58.86	62.57	–		62.57		7
9	Nikola Zindović	Montenegro	56.61	58.15	58.59		58.59		6
10	Dejan Angelovski	Macedonia	48.14	49.16	52.66		52.66	SB	5
11	Orxan Qasimov	Azerbaijan	49.35	48.45	50.07		50.07	SB	4
12	Rodrigo Llados	Andorra	35.84	x	33.03		35.84	PB	3
	Albert Marashi	Albania					DNS		

== Women ==
=== 100 metres ===
Wind:
Heat 1: -0.4 m/s
Heat 2: 0.3 m/s

Rank	Heat	Name	Nationality	Time	Notes	Points
1	2	Olga Lenskiy	Israel	11.61		14
2	2	Charlotte Wingfield	Malta	11.69	PB	13
3	2	Lenka Kršáková	Slovakia	11.76		12
4	2	Viola Kleiser	Austria	11.95		11
5	2	Tiffany Tshilumba	Luxembourg	12.03	SB	10
6	2	Valeriya Balyanina	Azerbaijan	12.07		9
7	2	Alina Cravcenco	Moldova	12.26		8
8	1	Cristina Llovera	Andorra	12.34	PB	7
9	1	Marija Stillo	Albania	12.55	PB	6
10	1	Mariam Bedukadze	Georgia	12.57	PB	5
11	1	Ksenija Kecman	Bosnia and Herzegovina	12.70	PB	4
12	1	Kristina Dubak	Montenegro	12.77		3
13	1	Valbona Selimi	Macedonia	12.83		2
14	1	Laura Bevington	AASSE ( Gibraltar)	13.59		1

=== 200 metres ===
Wind:
Heat 1: -0.9 m/s
Heat 2: +0.5 m/s

Rank	Heat	Name	Nationality	Time	Notes	Points
1	2	Olga Lenskiy	Israel	23.40		14
2	2	Alexandra Bezeková	Slovakia	23.72	PB	13
3	2	Viola Kleiser	Austria	23.85		12
4	2	Charlotte Wingfield	Malta	24.32	PB	11
5	2	Tiffany Tshilumba	Luxembourg	24.58		10
6	2	Alina Cravcenco	Moldova	24.80		9
7	2	Valeriya Balyanina	Azerbaijan	24.81	PB	8
8	1	Kanita Bilić	Bosnia and Herzegovina	25.39		7
9	1	Mariam Bedukadze	Georgia	25.55	PB	6
10	1	Cristina Llovera	Andorra	25.61	PB	5
11	1	Iveta Urshini	Albania	25.89	PB	4
12	1	Kristina Dubak	Montenegro	26.25		3
13	1	Drita Isljami	Macedonia	26.27		2
14	1	Zyanne Hook	AASSE ( Gibraltar)	26.61		1

=== 400 metres ===
Rank	Heat	Name	Nationality	Time	Notes	Points
1	2	Iveta Putálová	Slovakia	53.07		14
2	2	Susanne Walli	Austria	53.65	PB	13
3	2	Olesea Cojuhari	Moldova	54.20	SB	12
4	2	Janet Richard	Malta	55.06	SB	11
5	2	Shafa Mammadova	Azerbaijan	55.97	PB	10
6	1	Milica Ožegović	Bosnia and Herzegovina	56.36		9
7	2	Dariya Lokshin	Israel	56.84		8
8	1	Mariam Martinenko	Georgia	58.10	PB	7
9	2	Tamara Krumlovsky	Luxembourg	58.56		6
10	1	Frosina Risteska	Macedonia	58.90		5
11	1	Bruxhilda Qosja	Albania	1:01.07		4
12	1	Zyanne Hook	AASSE ( Gibraltar)	1:01.24		3
13	1	Ivana Sinđić	Montenegro	1:04.38		2
14	1	Maria Morato Canabate	Andorra	1:07.92		1

=== 800 metres ===
Rank	Name	Nationality	Time	Notes	Points
1	Charline Mathias	Luxembourg	2:01.77		14
2	Luiza Gega	Albania	2:02.36		13
3	Anastasiya Komarova	Azerbaijan	2:02.50	PB	12
4	Carina Schrempf	Austria	2:05.55		11
5	Paula Habovštiaková	Slovakia	2:07.67	SB	10
6	Vergilia Rotaru	Moldova	2:08.67	PB	9
7	Vladana Gavranović	Bosnia and Herzegovina	2:09.45	SB	8
8	Shanie Landen	Israel	2:10.36		7
9	Francesca Borg	Malta	2:14.21		6
10	Tinatin Papuashvili	Georgia	2:15.33	PB	5
11	Laia Isus Vilaprino	Andorra	2:20.75	PB	4
12	Jovana Đurović	Montenegro	2:29.07		3
13	Sermedie Latifova	Macedonia	2:30.27		2
14	Olivia Bissegger	AASSE ( Liechtenstein)	2:30.64		1

=== 1500 metres ===
Rank	Name	Nationality	Time	Notes	Points
1	Luiza Gega	Albania	4:11.58		14
2	Maor Tiyouri	Israel	4:26.86	PB	13
3	Martine Nobili	Luxembourg	4:27.46		12
4	Elisabeth Niedereder	Austria	4:29.23		11
5	Paula Habovštiaková	Slovakia	4:30.17		10
6	Vladana Gavranović	Bosnia and Herzegovina	4:34.32		9
7	Tinatin Papuashvili	Georgia	4:42.20	PB	8
8	Laia Isus Vilaprino	Andorra	4:46.10	PB	7
9	Iuliana Tcaciova	Moldova	4:48.70		6
10	Mona Lisa Camilleri	Malta	4:53.17		5
11	Lidija Todorović	Montenegro	5:03.39	SB	4
12	Marija Stojanovska	Macedonia	5:04.28		3
13	Olivia Bissegger	AASSE ( Liechtenstein)	5:05.26		2
	Chaltu Beji	Azerbaijan	DSQ		0

=== 3000 metres ===
Rank	Name	Nationality	Time	Notes	Points
1	Jennifer Wenth	Austria	9:11.98		14
2	Maor Tiyouri	Israel	9:32.11	PB	13
3	Bontu Megersa	Azerbaijan	9:42.14		12
4	Lucia Kimani	Bosnia and Herzegovina	9:55.34	SB	11
5	Ľubomíra Maníková	Slovakia	9:57.89	SB	10
6	Slađana Perunović	Montenegro	9:58.75		9
7	Vera Hoffmann	Luxembourg	10:01.50	PB	8
8	Natalia Clipca	Moldova	10:29.19		7
9	Lisa Marie Bezzina	Malta	10:42.32	PB	6
10	Alison Edwards	AASSE ( Gibraltar)	11:09.54		5
11	Silvia Felipo Sune	Andorra	11:31.43		4
12	Adrijana Pop Arsova	Macedonia	12:07.81		3
13	Lidia Berdzenishvili	Georgia	12:38.68		2

=== 5000 metres ===
Rank	Name	Nationality	Time	Notes	Points
1	Anita Baierl	Austria	16:33.09		14
2	Bontu Megersa	Azerbaijan	16:44.57		13
3	Lucia Kimani	Bosnia and Herzegovina	16:47.13	SB	12
4	Katarína Berešová	Slovakia	16:52.06		11
5	Martine Mellina	Luxembourg	17:16.14		10
6	Azaunt Taka	Israel	17:29.30		9
7	Slađana Perunović	Montenegro	17:43.40		8
8	Giuli Dekanadze	Georgia	18:25.46		7
9	Giselle Camilleri	Malta	19:14.66	PB	6
10	Alison Edwards	AASSE ( Gibraltar)	19:22.69		5
11	Adrijana Pop Arsova	Macedonia	21:45.63		4
	Natalia Cercheș	Moldova	DNF		0
	Silvia Felipo Sune	Andorra	DNS		0

=== 3000 metres steeplechase ===
Rank	Name	Nationality	Time	Notes	Points
1	Olesea Smovjenco	Moldova	10:55.61	PB	14
2	Rahima Zukić	Bosnia and Herzegovina	10:59.76		13
3	Danna Levin	Israel	11:02.57	SB	12
4	Stefanie Huber	Austria	11:09.22		11
5	Katarína Belová	Slovakia	11:11.34		10
6	Giuli Dekanadze	Georgia	11:23.18		9
7	Mona Lisa Camilleri	Malta	11:28.28	PB	8
8	Liz Weiler	Luxembourg	11:41.55	PB	7
9	Lidija Todorović	Montenegro	12:28.10		6
	Marija Stojanovska	Macedonia	DNS		0
	Chaltu Beji	Azerbaijan	DSQ		0

=== 100 metres hurdles ===
Wind:
Heat 1: -0.5 m/s
Heat 2: 0.0 m/s

Rank	Heat	Name	Nationality	Time	Notes	Points
1	2	Beate Schrott	Austria	13.18		14
2	2	Lucia Mokrášová	Slovakia	13.92	SB	13
3	2	Gorana Cvijetić	Bosnia and Herzegovina	14.11	SB	12
4	2	Victoria Rausch	Luxembourg	14.19		11
5	2	Maya Aviezer	Israel	14.21		10
6	2	Yekaterina Sokolova	Azerbaijan	14.42		9
7	2	Anna Berghii	Moldova	14.95		8
8	1	Rebecca Anne Fitz	Malta	16.37		7
9	1	Ljiljana Matović	Montenegro	16.90		6
10	1	Ivona Dimitrieska	Macedonia	17.70		5
11	1	Ainara Revuelta Pellicer	Andorra	18.72	PB	4
	2	Maiko Gogoladze	Georgia	DNS		0

=== 400 metres hurdles ===
Rank	Heat	Name	Nationality	Time	Notes	Points
1	2	Verena Menapace	Austria	58.94		14
2	2	Kim Reuland	Luxembourg	59.80		13
3	2	Andrea Holleyová	Slovakia	59.81		12
4	2	Anna Berghii	Moldova	59.82		11
5	2	Alexsandra Lokshin	Israel	1:01.58		10
6	2	Gorana Cvijetić	Bosnia and Herzegovina	1:02.83		9
7	2	Drita Isljami	Macedonia	1:03.32		8
8	1	Marilyn Grech	Malta	1:04.87		7
9	1	Lidiya Salikhova	Azerbaijan	1:06.02		6
10	1	Elene Khuskivadze	Georgia	1:07.90		5
11	1	Ana Mrvaljević	Montenegro	1:08.48		4
12	1	Bruxhilda Qosja	Albania	1:11.54		3
13	1	Ainara Revuelta Pellicer	Andorra	1:11.72		2

=== 4 × 100 metres relay ===
Rank	Heat	Nation	Athletes	Time	Notes	Points
1	2	Slovakia	Lenka Kršáková, Iveta Putálová, Jana Velďáková, Alexandra Bezeková	44.92		14
2	2	Israel	Dikla Goldenthal, Olga Lenskiy, Diana Vaisman, Efat Zelikovich	45.23		13
3	2	Austria	Eva-Maria Wimberger, Viola Kleiser, Alexandra Toth, Julia Schwarzinger	45.24		12
4	2	Azerbaijan	Yekaterina Sokolova, Yelena Chebanu, Valeriya Balyanina, Alyona Setina	46.10		11
5	1	Malta	Sarah Busuttil, Janet Richard, Rachel Fitz, Charlotte Wingfield	46.24		10
6	2	Moldova	Uliana Busila, Olesea Cojuhari, Alina Bordea, Alina Cravcenco	47.18		9
7	2	Bosnia and Herzegovina	Anja Erceg, Nikolija Stanivuković, Svjetlana Graorac, Ivana Macanović	48.17		8
8	1	Andorra	Cristina Llovera, Claudia Guri, Maria Gomez Cabeza, Maria Morato Canabate	50.76		7
9	1	Montenegro	Ivana Sinđić, Ana Mrvaljević, Ljiljana Matović, Kristina Dubak	51.17		6
	2	Luxembourg	Lara Marx, Anais Bauer, Laurence Jones, Patrizia Van Der Weken	DNF		0
	1	Albania	Ana Burda, Iveta Urshini, Bruxhilda Qosja, Marija Stillo	DSQ		0
	1	Georgia	Mariam Martinenko, Mariam Badukadze, Mariam Chakabadze, Salome Potskhverashvili	DSQ		0

=== 4 × 400 metres relay ===
Rank	Heat	Nation	Athletes	Time	Notes	Points
1	2	Slovakia	Sylvia Šalgovičová, Iveta Putálová, Alexandra Štuková, Alexandra Bezeková	3:35.03		14
2	2	Austria	Julia Schwarzinger, Susanne Walli, Verena Menapace, Carina Schrempf	3:37.51		13
3	2	Moldova	Alina Bordea, Vergilia Rotaru, Anna Berghii, Olesea Cojuhari	3:41.94		12
4	2	Luxembourg	Tamara Krumlovsky, Charline Mathias, Martine Nobili, Kim Reuland	3:44.13		11
5	2	Azerbaijan	Shafa Mammadova, Adila Mammadli, Zakiyya Hasanova, Anastasiya Komarova	3:44.40		10
6	1	Malta	Ylenia Pace, Francesca Borg, Charlene Attard, Janet Richard	3:47.93		9
7	2	Bosnia and Herzegovina	Ivana Macanović, Kanita Bilić, Vladana Gavranović, Milica Ožegović	3:51.13		8
8	1	Georgia	Mariam Martinenko, Mariam Badukadze, Mariam Chakaberia, Elene Khuskivadze	3:59.02		7
9	1	Macedonia	Vera Urdarevska, Sermedie Latifova, Drita Isljami, Frosina Risteska	4:00.81		6
10	1	Andorra	Cristina Llovera, Ainara Revuelta Pellicer, Maria Gomez Cabeza, Maria Morato Canabate	4:17.57		5
	2	Israel	Alexsandra Lokshin, Dariya Lokshin, Margareta Pogorelov, Shanie Landen	DSQ		0
	1	Montenegro	Lidija Todorović, Ivana Sinđić, Ana Mrvaljević, Slađana Perunović	DSQ		0

=== High jump ===
Rank	Name	Nationality	1.40	1.50	1.60	1.65	1.70	1.74	1.78	1.81	1.84	1.86	1.88	Mark	Notes	Points
1	Marija Vukovic	Montenegro	–	–	–	o	o	o	o	xxo	xo	o	x	1.86		14
2	Valentyna Liashenko	Georgia	–	–	–	–	o	o	o	o	o	xxx		1.84	SB	13
3	Maayan Shahaf	Israel	–	–	–	–	o	o	o	xo	xo	x–	x	1.84		12
4	Mladena Petrušić	Bosnia and Herzegovina	–	–	o	o	o	xo	o	xxx				1.78	=PB	11
5	Elodie Tshilumba	Luxembourg	–	–	–	–	o	o	xo	xxx				1.78	SB	10
=6	Claudia Guri Moreno	Andorra	–	o	o	o	xxo	o	xx					1.74	PB	8.5
=6	Zuzana Karaffová	Slovakia	–	o	o	o	xxo	o	xx					1.74		8.5
8	Nina Luyer	Austria	–	o	o	o	o	xxx						1.70		7
9	Ilona Salyamova	Azerbaijan	–	o	o	xxo	xx							1.65		6
10	Ana Modnicov	Moldova	o	o	o	xxx								1.60		5
11	Irena Temova	Macedonia	–	o	xxx									1.50		4
12	Dorianne Micallef	Malta	–	o	xx									1.50		3

=== Pole Vault ===
Rank	Name	Nationality	2.00	2.40	2.80	3.00	3.20	3.40	3.55	3.70	3.80	3.90	4.00	4.05	4.10	4.15	4.20	4.25	4.30	4.35	Mark	Notes	Points
1	Kira Grunberg	Austria	–	–	–	–	–	–	–	–	–	–	o	–	–	–	o	–	–	o	4.35		14
2	Gina Reuland	Luxembourg	–	–	–	–	–	–	–	–	–	o	–	–	o	–	o	–	–	xxx	4.20		13
3	Olga Dogadko Bronshtein	Israel	–	–	–	–	o	o	xxo	xo	x										3.70	SB	12
4	Yelena Gladkova	Azerbaijan	–	–	–	o	o	o	o	xxo	xx										3.70	SB	11
5	Anna Hrvolová	Slovakia	–	–	–	o	o	o	xxx												3.40	=SB	10
6	Martina Muraccini	AASSE ( San Marino)	–	–	–	o	o	xxx													3.20	PB	9
7	Irina Tverdohlebova	Moldova	–	–	o	o	xo	xxx													3.20		8
8	Diana Zolotukhina	Georgia	–	o	o	o	xxx														3.00		7
=9	Maria Gomez Cabeza	Andorra	o	xxx																	2.00		5.5
=9	Joanne Vella	Malta	o	xxx																	2.00		5.5

=== Long jump ===
Rank	Name	Nationality	#1	#2	#3	#4	Mark	Notes	Points
1	Jana Velďáková	Slovakia	6.21	6.18	x	6.68	6.68		14
2	Rebecca Camilleri	Malta	x	6.11	x	6.38	6.38	SB	13
3	Sarah Lagger	Austria	5.91	5.68	5.86	6.17	6.17		12
4	Maiko Gogoladze	Georgia	x	6.00	5.94	5.90	6.00		11
5	Yekaterina Sariyeva	Azerbaijan	5.51	x	5.69		5.69		10
6	Natalia Cipilencu	Moldova	5.53	5.43	5.64		5.64		9
7	Laurence Jones	Luxembourg	x	5.58	3.31		5.58		8
8	Tanja Marković	Bosnia and Herzegovina	5.48	x	5.50		5.50		7
9	Martina Miroska	Macedonia	5.13	5.25	5.45		5.45	PB	6
10	Ljiljana Matović	Montenegro	5.30	x	x		5.30		5
11	Claudia Guri Moreno	Andorra	x	5.26	5.27		5.27	PB	4
12	Ana Burda	Albania	5.10	5.02	4.87		5.10		3
	Efat Zelikovich	Israel	x	x	x		NM		0

=== Triple jump ===
Rank	Name	Nationality	#1	#2	#3	#4	Mark	Notes	Points
1	Hanna Knyazyeva Minenko	Israel	x	14.33	14.41	x	14.41		14
2	Dana Velďáková	Slovakia	x	12.97	13.95	x	13.95	SB	13
3	Yekaterina Sariyeva	Azerbaijan	x	13.27	x	13.08	13.27		12
4	Michaela Egger	Austria	13.03	12.60	12.86	x	13.03	SB	11
5	Iryna Mykytiuk	Georgia	12.21	12.24	x		12.24		10
6	Natalia Cipilencu	Moldova	x	x	12.15		12.15		9
7	Rebecca Sare	Malta	x	12.02	12.13		12.13	SB	8
8	Claudia Guri Moreno	Andorra	x	11.90	11.35		11.90	PB	7
9	Melika Kasumović	Bosnia and Herzegovina	11.53	x	11.52		11.53		6
10	Ljiljana Matović	Montenegro	11.08	11.37	x		11.37		5
11	Lara Marx	Luxembourg	11.25	10.67	10.88		11.25		4
12	Mateja Efremovska	Macedonia	10.09	10.03	9.81		10.09		3
	Ana Burda	Albania					DNS		0

=== Shot put ===
Rank	Name	Nationality	#1	#2	#3	#4	Mark	Notes	Points
1	Kristina Rakočević	Montenegro	14.85	14.73	x	14.73	14.85		14
2	Dimitriana Surdu	Moldova	13.85	x	14.34	14.28	14.34		13
3	Anastasiya Muchkayev	Israel	14.16	14.30	x	x	14.30		12
4	Patrícia Slošárová	Slovakia	12.99	14.18	13.91	x	14.18	PB	11
5	Hanna Skydan	Azerbaijan	13.76	12.90	13.35		13.76	PB	10
6	Stephanie Krumlovsky	Luxembourg	x	13.34	13.15		13.34		9
7	Gorana Tešanović	Bosnia and Herzegovina	12.47	12.94	11.83		12.94		8
8	Veronika Watzek	Austria	12.00	12.73	x		12.73		7
9	Sopo Shatirishvili	Georgia	10.40	11.07	11.45		11.45		6
10	Julijana Veljanovska	Macedonia	9.95	9.26	x		9.95	PB	5
11	Antoniella Chouhal	Malta	8.88	8.88	9.78		9.78		4
12	Maria Gomez Cabeza	Andorra	x	7.41	5.44		7.41		3

=== Discus Throw ===
Rank	Name	Nationality	#1	#2	#3	#4	Mark	Notes	Points
1	Natalia Stratulat	Moldova	x	55.08	53.72	50.92	55.08		14
2	Kristina Rakočević	Montenegro	53.91	50.23	52.86	x	53.91	PB	13
3	Hanna Skydan	Azerbaijan	33.28	46.88	49.50	48.42	49.50	PB	12
4	Anastasiya Muchkayev	Israel	48.81	x	x	x	48.81		11
5	Veronika Watzek	Austria	39.00	47.40	x		47.40	SB	10
6	Gorana Tešanović	Bosnia and Herzegovina	42.22	44.14	44.70		44.70		9
7	Ivona Tomanová	Slovakia	x	40.09	42.02		42.02		8
8	Laura Rheinberger	AASSE ( Liechtenstein)	30.58	34.75	35.89		35.89	PB	7
9	Tessy Debra	Luxembourg	26.90	33.86	31.08		33.86	PB	6
10	Julijana Veljanovska	Macedonia	33.16	32.50	33.50		33.50	PB	5
11	Nino Tsikvadze	Georgia	33.38	33.28	x		33.38		4
12	Antoniella Chouhal	Malta	24.61	32.37	32.35		32.37		3
13	Elena Villalon Aguado	Andorra	20.50	21.27	x		21.27		2
	Iveta Urshini	Albania					DNS		0

=== Hammer Throw ===
Rank	Name	Nationality	#1	#2	#3	#4	Mark	Notes	Points
1	Martina Hrašnová	Slovakia	68.94	69.31	68.83	66.61	69.31		14
2	Hanna Skydan	Azerbaijan	x	55.80	65.86	68.32	68.32		13
3	Marina Nikisenko	Moldova	61.88	63.94	65.08	x	65.08		12
4	Evgenia Zabolotni-Zagynayko	Israel	52.36	54.02	55.40	55.87	55.87		11
5	Julia Siart	Austria	48.59	49.20	50.35		50.35		10
6	Stefani Vukajlovic	Bosnia and Herzegovina	49.53	x	x		49.53		9
7	Isabeau Pleimling	Luxembourg	42.83	39.71	x		42.83		8
8	Elena Villalon Aguado	Andorra	35.93	35.95	36.81		36.81		7
9	Milica Vukadinović	Montenegro	36.21	36.18	34.83		36.21		6
10	Antoniella Chouhal	Malta	32.52	34.63	34.08		34.63		5
11	Mateja Efremovska	Macedonia	18.41	r			18.41		4
	Nino Tsikvadze	Georgia	x	x	x		NM		0

=== Javelin Throw ===
Rank	Name	Nationality	#1	#2	#3	#4	Mark	Notes	Points
1	Margaryta Dorozhon	Israel	56.40	x	58.00	x	58.00		14
2	Elisabeth Eberl	Austria	49.19	49.45	48.46	x	49.45		13
3	Mihaela Tacu	Moldova	44.36	44.75	46.55	45.47	46.55		12
4	Aleksandra Vidović	Bosnia and Herzegovina	44.79	41.06	42.31	40.35	44.79		11
5	Marija Bogavac	Montenegro	42.17	42.87	44.54		44.54		10
6	Veroniqu Michel	Luxembourg	37.15	40.03	43.53		43.53	PB	9
7	Veronika Ľašová	Slovakia	x	x	40.35		40.35		8
8	Lali Kaladze	Georgia	35.11	37.71	38.75		38.75	PB	7
9	Joanne Vella	Malta	36.23	37.64	34.21		37.64		6
10	Irada Aliyeva	Azerbaijan	x	36.99	x		36.99		5
11	Laura Rheinberger	AASSE ( Liechtenstein)	33.09	33.13	x		33.13		4
12	Mateja Efremovska	Macedonia	21.07	19.83	22.04		22.04		3
13	Maria Morato Canabate	Andorra	16.00	17.58	16.33		17.58		2
	Marija Stillo	Albania					DNS		0
