= Cycling at the 2015 European Games – Qualification =

A total of 346 athletes will compete in the cycling competitions at the 2015 European Games; 223 in road cycling, 75 in mountain biking and 48 in BMX. All quota places are based on the UCI Nations Rankings at 31 December 2014.

The quota places were presented by UEC.

== Summary ==
Nation	Road				MTB		BMX		Total	
Nation	Men		Women		M	W	M	W	Q	R
Nation	RR	TT	RR	TT	M	W	M	W	Q	R
Albania	2								2	2
Andorra	1								1	1
Austria	4	1	2	1	1	1			10	8
Azerbaijan	3	2	2	1	2	2			12	9
Belarus	3	1	4	2			1	1	12	9
Belgium	5	2	4	2	2	2	1	2	20	16
Bosnia and Herzegovina	1								1	1
Bulgaria	2								2	2
Croatia	3	1	1		1				6	5
Czech Republic	4	2	2	1	2	2	1	2	16	13
Denmark	5	2	2	1	1	1	2	2	16	13
Estonia	4	1			1			1	7	6
Finland	1		2	1	1				5	4
France	5	2	4	2	3	3	3	2	24	20
Georgia	2								2	2
Germany	4	2	5	2	3	3	2	1	22	18
Great Britain	5	2	5	2	1		3	1	19	15
Greece	3	1	1		1		1	1	8	7
Hungary	2		1		1		1		5	5
Ireland	4	1							5	4
Israel	2		1		1				4	4
Italy	5	2	5	2	3	2	2		21	17
Latvia	3	1			1		3	1	9	8
Lithuania	3	1	2	1			1	1	9	7
Luxembourg	3	1	2	1	1				8	6
Moldova	3	1							3	1
Netherlands	5	2	5	2	2		3	2	21	17
Norway	4	2	2	1	1	2	2	1	15	12
Poland	5	2	4	2	1	3			17	13
Portugal	4	2			1		1		8	6
Romania	4	1			1				6	5
Russia	5	2	4	2	1	1	3	1	19	15
Serbia	2				1				3	3
Slovakia	3	1			2				6	5
Slovenia	5	2	2	1	1	3			14	11
Spain	5	1	1		3		1	1	12	11
Sweden	3	1	5	2	2	2	1		16	13
Switzerland	4	1	2	1	3	3	2		16	14
Turkey	3	1	1		1				6	5
Ukraine	5	2	2	1	1	1	1		13	10
Total: 40 NOCs	138	47	73	31	47	31	35	20	422	344

Legend

- RR – Road Race
- TT – Individual Time Trial
- Q – Quotas
- R – Riders

== Road cycling ==
=== Men's road race ===
Means of qualification	Ranking by nation	Athletes per NOC	Qualified
Host country	—	3	Azerbaijan
UCI Nation Ranking	1–10	5	Italy; Belgium; France; Spain; Netherlands; Russia; Great Britain; Poland; Ukraine; Slovenia; Denmark
UCI Nation Ranking	11–20	4	Austria; Czech Republic; Germany; Norway; Portugal; Switzerland; Romania; Estonia; Ireland
UCI Nation Ranking	21–30	3	Latvia; Croatia; Luxembourg; Sweden; Greece; Moldova; Turkey; Slovakia; Belarus; Lithuania
UCI Nation Ranking	31–36	2	Bulgaria; Serbia; Hungary; Albania; Georgia; Israel
UCI Nation Ranking	37–40	1	Finland; Bosnia and Herzegovina
Universality places	7 NOCs	1	Andorra; Kosovo; Malta; Monaco
Total		139	

=== Women's road race ===
Means of qualification	Ranking by nation	Athletes per NOC	Qualified
Host country	—	2	Azerbaijan
UCI Nation Ranking	1–5	5	Netherlands; Italy; Germany; Great Britain; Sweden
UCI Nation Ranking	6–10	4	France; Belgium; Russia; Belarus; Poland
UCI Nation Ranking	11–20	2	Ukraine; Norway; Switzerland; Luxembourg; Finland; Austria; Czech Republic; Lithuania; Denmark; Slovenia
UCI Nation Ranking	21–26	1	Spain; Croatia; Greece; Hungary; Turkey; Israel
Universality places	3 NOCs	1	Bosnia and Herzegovina; Malta; Slovakia
Total		70	

=== Men's time trial ===
Means of qualification	Ranking by nation	Athletes per NOC	Qualified
Host country	—	2	Azerbaijan
UCI Nation Ranking	1–15	2	Italy; Belgium; France; Spain; Netherlands; Russia; Poland; Ukraine; Slovenia; Denmark; Austria; Czech Republic; Germany; Norway; Portugal; Great Britain
UCI Nation Ranking	16–30	1	Switzerland; Romania; Estonia; Ireland; Latvia; Croatia; Luxembourg; Sweden; Greece; Moldova; Turkey; Slovakia; Belarus; Lithuania
Total			45

=== Women's time trial ===
Means of qualification	Ranking by nation	Athletes per NOC	Qualified
Host country	—	2	Azerbaijan
UCI Nation Ranking	1–10	2	Netherlands; Italy; Germany; Great Britain; Sweden; France; Belgium; Russia; Belarus; Poland
UCI Nation Ranking	11–20	1	Ukraine; Norway; Switzerland; Luxembourg; Finland; Austria; Czech Republic; Lithuania; Denmark; Slovenia
Total		30	

== Mountain biking ==
=== Men's cross country ===
Means of qualification	Ranking by nation	Athletes per NOC	Qualified
Host country	—	2	Azerbaijan
UCI Nation Ranking	1–5	3	Switzerland; France; Germany; Spain; Italy
UCI Nation Ranking	6–10	2	Netherlands; Czech Republic; Belgium; Sweden; Slovakia
UCI Nation Ranking	11–29	1	Austria; Portugal; Great Britain; Russia; Israel; Ukraine; Poland; Norway; Hungary; Denmark; Latvia; Greece; Finland; Turkey; Estonia; Romania; Slovenia; Luxembourg; Serbia
Total		46	

=== Women's cross country ===
Means of qualification	Ranking by nation	Athletes per NOC	Qualified
Host country	—	2	Azerbaijan
UCI Nation Ranking	1–5	3	Switzerland; Slovenia; Germany; Poland; France
UCI Nation Ranking	6–10	2	Norway; Sweden; Belgium; Czech Republic; Italy
UCI Nation Ranking	11–14	1	Russia; Denmark; Austria; Ukraine
Total		31	

== BMX ==
=== Men ===
Means of qualification	Ranking by nation	Athletes per NOC	Qualified
~~Host country~~	—	~~1~~	~~Azerbaijan~~
UCI Nation Ranking	1–5	3	Great Britain; Netherlands; France; Latvia; Russia
UCI Nation Ranking	6–10	2	Switzerland; Italy; Germany; Denmark; Norway
UCI Nation Ranking	11–20	1	Hungary; Spain; Greece; Portugal; Ukraine; Sweden; Belarus; Lithuania; Belgium; Czech Republic
Total		35	

=== Women ===
Means of qualification	Ranking by nation	Athletes per NOC	Qualified
~~Host country~~	—	~~1~~	~~Azerbaijan~~
UCI Nation Ranking	1–5	2	Netherlands; France; Denmark; Czech Republic; Belgium
UCI Nation Ranking	6–14	1	Russia; Lithuania; Great Britain; Germany; Latvia; Belarus; Spain; Norway; Estonia; Greece
Total		20	
