= 2015 European Judo Championships =

Judo Judo at the 2015 European Games
- Venue: Heydar Aliyev Sports and Exhibition Complex
- Location: Baku, Azerbaijan
- Dates: 25–28 June 2015
- Competitors: 388 from 49 nations
- Website: Official website

Champions
- Men's team: France (13th title)
- Women's team: France (20th title)

Competition at external databases
- Links: IJF • EJU • JudoInside

The 2015 European Judo Championships were organised by the European Judo Union. Initially it was planned that the championships would be held in Glasgow, Scotland, from 9 to 12 April 2015. On 21 February 2015, it was announced that the competition would be held in Baku, Azerbaijan, during the 2015 European Games. The individual contests took place on 25–27 June 2015.

The Organizing Committee announced on 4 April 2014 that visually impaired judo will be included as a medal event. This will make the European Games the first continental games to "fully integrate" a Para-sport discipline into its sports programme.

== Medal overview ==
=== Men's events ===
Event	Gold	Silver	Bronze
60 kg	Beslan Mudranov; Russia	Orkhan Safarov; Azerbaijan	Ludovic Chammartin; Switzerland
60 kg	Beslan Mudranov; Russia	Orkhan Safarov; Azerbaijan	Amiran Papinashvili; Georgia
66 kg	Kamal Khan-Magomedov; Russia	Loïc Korval; France	Mikhail Pulyaev; Russia
66 kg	Kamal Khan-Magomedov; Russia	Loïc Korval; France	Sebastian Seidl; Germany
73 kg	Sagi Muki; Israel	Nugzar Tatalashvili; Georgia	Rok Drakšič; Slovenia
73 kg	Sagi Muki; Israel	Nugzar Tatalashvili; Georgia	Dirk van Tichelt; Belgium
81 kg	Avtandili Tchrikishvili; Georgia	Ivan Nifontov; Russia	Alexander Wieczerzak; Germany
81 kg	Avtandili Tchrikishvili; Georgia	Ivan Nifontov; Russia	Loïc Pietri; France
90 kg	Kirill Denisov; Russia	Varlam Liparteliani; Georgia	Ilias Iliadis; Greece
90 kg	Kirill Denisov; Russia	Varlam Liparteliani; Georgia	Guillaume Elmont; Netherlands
100 kg	Henk Grol; Netherlands	Lukáš Krpálek; Czech Republic	Toma Nikiforov; Belgium
100 kg	Henk Grol; Netherlands	Lukáš Krpálek; Czech Republic	Cyrille Maret; France
+100 kg	Adam Okruashvili; Georgia	Or Sasson; Israel	Renat Saidov; Russia
+100 kg	Adam Okruashvili; Georgia	Or Sasson; Israel	Iakiv Khammo; Ukraine
Team	France; Pierre Duprat; Alexandre Iddir; Loic Korval; David Larose; Cyrille Maret; Loïc Pietri; Florent Urani	Georgia; Beka Gviniashvili; Varlam Liparteliani; Ushangi Margiani; Levani Matiashvili; Adam Okruashvili; Amiran Papinashvili; Lasha Shavdatuashvili; Nugzar Tatalashvili; Avtandili Tchrikishvili	Russia; Kirill Denisov; Denis Iartcev; Kamal Khan-Magomedov; Alan Khubetsov; Ivan Nifontov; Mikhail Pulyaev; Renat Saidov; Kirill Voprosov
Team	France; Pierre Duprat; Alexandre Iddir; Loic Korval; David Larose; Cyrille Maret; Loïc Pietri; Florent Urani	Georgia; Beka Gviniashvili; Varlam Liparteliani; Ushangi Margiani; Levani Matiashvili; Adam Okruashvili; Amiran Papinashvili; Lasha Shavdatuashvili; Nugzar Tatalashvili; Avtandili Tchrikishvili	Ukraine; Serhiy Drebot; Vitalii Dudchyk; Oleksandr Gordiienko; Iakiv Khammo; Artem Khomula; Quedjau Nhabali; Vadym Synyavsky; Georgii Zantaraia
Visually impaired +90 kg	Ilham Zakiyev; Azerbaijan	Oleksandr Pominov; Ukraine	Aleksandr Parasiuk; Russia
Visually impaired +90 kg	Ilham Zakiyev; Azerbaijan	Oleksandr Pominov; Ukraine	Zakir Mislimov; Azerbaijan

=== Women's events ===
Event	Gold	Silver	Bronze
48 kg	Charline Van Snick; Belgium	Ebru Şahin; Turkey	Éva Csernoviczki; Hungary
48 kg	Charline Van Snick; Belgium	Ebru Şahin; Turkey	Irina Dolgova; Russia
52 kg	Andreea Chițu; Romania	Annabelle Euranie; France	Mareen Kräh; Germany
52 kg	Andreea Chițu; Romania	Annabelle Euranie; France	Natalia Kuziutina; Russia
57 kg	Telma Monteiro; Portugal	Hedvig Karakas; Hungary	Nora Gjakova; Kosovo
57 kg	Telma Monteiro; Portugal	Hedvig Karakas; Hungary	Miryam Roper; Germany
63 kg	Martyna Trajdos; Germany	Tina Trstenjak; Slovenia	Yarden Gerbi; Israel
63 kg	Martyna Trajdos; Germany	Tina Trstenjak; Slovenia	Clarisse Agbegnenou; France
70 kg	Kim Polling; Netherlands	Laura Vargas Koch; Germany	Bernadette Graf; Austria
70 kg	Kim Polling; Netherlands	Laura Vargas Koch; Germany	Szaundra Diedrich; Germany
78 kg	Marhinde Verkerk; Netherlands	Luise Malzahn; Germany	Anamari Velenšek; Slovenia
78 kg	Marhinde Verkerk; Netherlands	Luise Malzahn; Germany	Guusje Steenhuis; Netherlands
+78 kg	Émilie Andéol; France	Jasmin Külbs; Germany	Belkıs Zehra Kaya; Turkey
+78 kg	Émilie Andéol; France	Jasmin Külbs; Germany	Svitlana Iaromka; Ukraine
Team	France; Clarisse Agbegnenou; Émilie Andéol; Laetitia Blot; Gévrise Émane; Annabelle Euranie; Marie-Ève Gahié; Madeleine Malonga; Automne Pavia	Germany; Szaundra Diedrich; Franziska Konitz; Mareen Kräh; Luise Malzahn; Miryam Roper; Martyna Trajdos; Laura Vargas Koch; Viola Wächter	Italy; Giulia Cantoni; Assunta Galeone; Odette Giuffrida; Edwige Gwend; Elisa Marchio; Valentina Moscatt; Giulia Quintavalle
Team	France; Clarisse Agbegnenou; Émilie Andéol; Laetitia Blot; Gévrise Émane; Annabelle Euranie; Marie-Ève Gahié; Madeleine Malonga; Automne Pavia	Germany; Szaundra Diedrich; Franziska Konitz; Mareen Kräh; Luise Malzahn; Miryam Roper; Martyna Trajdos; Laura Vargas Koch; Viola Wächter	Slovenia; Klara Apotekar; Vlora Beđeti; Nina Milošević; Petra Nareks; Anka Pogačnik; Tina Trstenjak; Anamari Velenšek; Kristina Vršič
Visually impaired 57 kg	Inna Cherniak; Ukraine	Sabina Abdullayeva; Azerbaijan	Nataliya Nikolaychyk; Ukraine
Visually impaired 57 kg	Inna Cherniak; Ukraine	Sabina Abdullayeva; Azerbaijan	Ramona Brussig; Germany

=== Medal table ===
* Host nation (Azerbaijan)

Rank	Nation	Gold	Silver	Bronze	Total
1	France	3	2	3	8
2	Russia	3	1	6	10
3	Netherlands	3	0	2	5
4	Georgia	2	3	1	6
5	Germany	1	4	6	11
6	Azerbaijan*	1	2	1	4
7	Ukraine	1	1	4	6
8	Israel	1	1	1	3
9	Belgium	1	0	2	3
10	Portugal	1	0	0	1
10	Romania	1	0	0	1
12	Slovenia	0	1	3	4
13	Hungary	0	1	1	2
13	Turkey	0	1	1	2
15	Czech Republic	0	1	0	1
16	Austria	0	0	1	1
16	Greece	0	0	1	1
16	Italy	0	0	1	1
16	Kosovo	0	0	1	1
16	Switzerland	0	0	1	1
Totals (20 entries)		18	18	36	72

== Participating nations ==
- Albania (1)
- Andorra (1)
- Armenia (3)
- Austria (9)
- Azerbaijan (21)
- Belarus (7)
- Belgium (12)
- Bosnia and Herzegovina (3)
- Bulgaria (3)
- Croatia (6)
- Cyprus (1)
- Czech Republic (9)
- Denmark (1)
- Estonia (7)
- Finland (4)
- France (18)
- Georgia (11)
- Germany (19)
- Great Britain (14)
- Greece (5)
- Hungary (17)
- Iceland (1)
- Ireland (1)
- Israel (18)
- Italy (15)
- Kosovo (3)
- Latvia (6)
- Liechtenstein (2)
- Lithuania (4)
- Luxembourg (3)
- Macedonia (1)
- Malta (2)
- Moldova (3)
- Monaco (2)
- Montenegro (3)
- Netherlands (13)
- Poland (15)
- Portugal (14)
- Romania (12)
- Russia (20)
- San Marino (1)
- Serbia (9)
- Slovakia (3)
- Slovenia (17)
- Spain (17)
- Sweden (7)
- Switzerland (7)
- Turkey (15)
- Ukraine (17)
