= Cycling at the 2015 European Games – Men's road race =

Cycling race

Men's road race at the 2015 European Games
- Venue: Baku (215.8 km)
- Date: 21 June
- Competitors: 124 from 38 nations
- Winning time: 5h 27' 25"

Medalists
gold medal	Luis León Sánchez	Spain
silver medal	Andriy Hrivko	Ukraine
bronze medal	Petr Vakoč	Czech Republic

The men's road race cycling event at the 2015 European Games in Baku took place on 21 June.

== Results ==
Rank	Rider	Nation	Time
1st place, gold medalist(s)	Luis León Sánchez	Spain	5h 27' 25"
2nd place, silver medalist(s)	Andriy Hrivko	Ukraine	+ 0"
3rd place, bronze medalist(s)	Petr Vakoč	Czech Republic	+ 0"
4	Jesús Herrada	Spain	+ 0"
5	Giacomo Nizzolo	Italy	+ 0"
6	Tom Boonen	Belgium	+ 4"
7	Aleksejs Saramotins	Latvia	+ 4"
8	Niki Terpstra	Netherlands	+ 4"
9	Anthony Turgis	France	+ 4"
10	Kévin Ledanois	France	+ 8"
11	Pavel Kochetkov	Russia	+ 8"
12	Elia Viviani	Italy	+ 42"
13	Filippo Pozzato	Italy	+ 54"
14	Vitaliy Buts	Ukraine	+ 1' 01"
15	Gatis Smukulis	Latvia	+ 1' 01"
16	Andrei Nechita	Romania	+ 1' 01"
17	Filipe Cardoso	Portugal	+ 1' 01"
18	Maciej Paterski	Poland	+ 1' 01"
19	Jens Keukeleire	Belgium	+ 1' 01"
20	Patrick Schelling	Switzerland	+ 4' 22"
21	Žydrūnas Savickas	Lithuania	+ 4' 48"
22	Toms Skujiņš	Latvia	+ 4' 48"
23	Simon Zahner	Switzerland	+ 4' 48"
24	Manuele Boaro	Italy	+ 5' 56"
25	Mykhaylo Kononenko	Ukraine	+ 6' 05"
26	Lukas Jaun	Switzerland	+ 6' 05"
27	Martin Kohler	Switzerland	+ 6' 14"
28	Martin Laas	Estonia	+ 6' 14"
29	Matej Mugerli	Slovenia	+ 6' 18"
30	Wouter Wippert	Netherlands	+ 6' 18"
31	Denys Kostyuk	Ukraine	+ 6' 18"
32	Joël Zangerlé	Luxembourg	+ 6' 18"
33	Yuri Trofimov	Russia	+ 6' 18"
34	Bruno Maltar	Croatia	+ 6' 18"
35	Michał Podlaski	Poland	+ 6' 18"
36	Ioannis Tamouridis	Greece	+ 6' 18"
37	Redi Halilaj	Albania	+ 6' 18"
38	Edgar Pinto	Portugal	+ 6' 18"
39	Carlos Barbero	Spain	+ 6' 18"
40	Sergey Chernetskiy	Russia	+ 6' 18"
41	Bartłomiej Matysiak	Poland	+ 6' 18"
42	Cristian Raileanu	Moldova	+ 6' 18"
43	Bart De Clercq	Belgium	+ 6' 31"
44	Dario Cataldo	Italy	+ 6' 31"
45	Conor Dunne	Ireland	+ 6' 31"
46	Yauheni Hutarovich	Belarus	+ 14' 44"
47	Aksel Nõmmela	Estonia	+ 14' 44"
48	Eddie Dunbar	Ireland	+ 14' 44"
49	Risto Raid	Estonia	+ 14' 54"
50	Michael Kolář	Slovakia	+ 15' 00"
51	Daniel Turek	Czech Republic	+ 15' 00"
52	Jan Sokol	Austria	+ 15' 00"
53	Josef Černý	Czech Republic	+ 15' 00"
54	Andreas Hofer	Austria	+ 15' 00"
55	Elchin Asadov	Azerbaijan	+ 15' 00"
56	Eduard-Michael Grosu	Romania	+ 15' 00"
57	Žolt Dér	Hungary	+ 15' 00"
58	Miraç Kal	Turkey	+ 15' 00"
59	Stefan Hristov	Bulgaria	+ 15' 00"
60	Alex Kirsch	Luxembourg	+ 15' 00"
	Alexis Gougeard	France	DNF
	Ilnur Zakarin	Russia	DNF
	Rafael Reis	Portugal	DNF
	Lluís Mas	Spain	DNF
	Tiesj Benoot	Belgium	DNF
	Julian Alaphilippe	France	DNF
	Vasil Kiryienka	Belarus	DNF
	José Gonçalves	Portugal	DNF
	Nikolay Mihaylov	Bulgaria	DNF
	Stijn Vandenbergh	Belgium	DNF
	Maarten Wynants	Belgium	DNF
	Ángel Vicioso	Spain	DNF
	Alexey Tsatevich	Russia	DNF
	Fábio Silvestre	Portugal	DNF
	Sean Downey	Ireland	DNF
	Mateusz Taciak	Poland	DNF
	Paweł Bernas	Poland	DNF
	Oleksandr Polivoda	Ukraine	DNF
	Samir Jabrayilov	Azerbaijan	DNF
	Ido Zilberstein	Israel	DNF
	Alessandro Vanotti	Italy	DNF
	Thomas Boudat	France	DNF
	Giorgi Nareklishvili	Georgia	DNF
	Yoav Bear	Israel	DNF
	Andriy Vasylyuk	Ukraine	DNF
	Erik Baška	Slovakia	DNF
	Ľuboš Malovec	Slovakia	DNF
	Kamil Gradek	Poland	DNF
	Eugert Zhupa	Albania	DNF
	Samuel Pökälä	Finland	DNF
	Polychronis Tzortzakis	Greece	DNF
	Simon Pellaud	Switzerland	DNF
	Jan Tratnik	Slovenia	DNF
	Daniel Crista	Romania	DNF
	Evaldas Šiškevičius	Lithuania	DNF
	Onur Balkan	Turkey	DNF
	Stef Clement	Netherlands	DNF
	Pim Ligthart	Netherlands	DNF
	Krisztián Lovassy	Hungary	DNF
	Alois Kaňkovský	Czech Republic	DNF
	Maxime Bouet	France	DNF
	Anton Vorobyev	Russia	DNF
	Mihkel Räim	Estonia	DNF
	Emanuel Kišerlovski	Croatia	DNF
	Charalampos Kastrantas	Greece	DNF
	Miloš Borisavljević	Serbia	DNF
	Ahmet Örken	Turkey	DNF
	Josip Rumac	Croatia	DNF
	Michal Schlegel	Czech Republic	DNF
	Ryan Mullen	Ireland	DNF
	Gabor Kasa	Serbia	DNF
	Sergiu Cioban	Moldova	DNF
	Victor Langellotti	Monaco	DNF
	David Albós	Andorra	DNF
	Maurice Formosa	Malta	DNF
	Nick van der Lijke	Netherlands	DNF
	Gregor Gazvoda	Slovenia	DNF
	Lars Pria	Romania	DNF
	Pit Schlechter	Luxembourg	DNF
	Mujo Kurtović	Bosnia and Herzegovina	DNF
	Dimitri Khosiauri	Georgia	DNF
	Jack Wilson	Ireland	DNF
	Qëndrim Guri	Kosovo	DNF
	Ignatas Konovalovas	Lithuania	DSQ
	Maksym Averin	Azerbaijan	DNS
