= Athletics at the 2015 European Games =

- Venue: Baku National Stadium
- Dates: 21–22 June 2015
- Competitors: 446

Athletics at the 2015 European Games took place at the Baku National Stadium and on the streets of Baku, Azerbaijan.

== Program ==
The main athletics programme in the National Stadium was a combined European Games and 2015 European Team Championships Third League competition. It is the lowest league of the Team Championships, with 17 teams from smaller European athletics nations, including Azerbaijan.

600 athletes in total – competed over two days for points in 20 men's and women's track and field events. Points were to be combined to produce national team totals, and games medals awarded to the top three nations. Medals are not awarded for individual events. The top four nations also win promotion from the Third League of the European Team Championships to the Second League.

As required by the European Team Championship format, both genders compete in the non-Olympic 3000 m event, while Olympic events longer than 5000 m, and combined events, are not held. Athletics at the European Games offers possible qualification standards for the Rio 2016 Summer Olympics.

A second non-medal athletics competition was held as a series of demonstration events on the streets of Baku in a Great City Games format. Events include the high jump and pole vault, and 24 athletes were scheduled to compete. Plans to include street running races were reportedly cancelled.

Athletics was not included in the earliest list of sports confirmed for the 2015 Games, as the European Athletics authorities at that stage were minded not to take part. However, following negotiations with the organising authorities, a compromise was reached in February 2014 between the organisers and European Athletics to hold the two sets of competitions. The agreement was confirmed by Pat Hickey, president of the European Olympic Committees in February 2015.

== Medal summary ==
Event	Gold	Silver	Bronze
Mixed team	Slovakia; Katarína Belová; Tomáš Benko; Katarína Berešová; Alexandra Bezeková; Andrej Bician; Jakub Bottlík; Matúš Bubeník; Tomáš Celko; Denis Danáč; Paula Habovštiaková; Andrea Holleyová; Martina Hrašnová; Anna Hrvolová; Alexander Jablokov; Zuzana Karaffová; Martin Koch; Lenka Kršáková; Martin Kučera; Veronika Lašová; Marcel Lomnický; Ľubomíra Maníková; Jakub Matúš; Lucia Mokrašová; Matúš Olej; Dušan Páleník; Jozef Pelikán; Michaela Pešková; Lukáš Prevalinec; Iveta Putálová; Jozef Repčík; Silvia Šalgovičová; Marek Šefránek; Lucia Slaničková; Patrícia Slosárová; Alexandra Štuková; Ivona Tomanová; Roman Turčáni; Jozef Urban; Dana Velďáková; Jana Velďáková; Tomáš Veszelka; Juraj Vitko; Ján Volko; Monika Weigertová; Adam Zavacký; Pavol Ženčár; Patrik Ženúch; Ján Zmoray	Austria; Anita Baielr; Ekemini Bassey; Dominik Distelberger; Elisabeth Eberl; Michaela Egger; Nikolaus Franzmair; Markus Fuchs; Mario Gebhard; Benjamin Grill; Kira Grunberg; Christoph Haslauer; Stefanie Huber; Ina Huemer; Dominik Hufnagl; Thomas Kain; Matthias Kaserer; Julio Kellerer; Paul Kilbertus; Viola Kleiser; Josip Kopic; Anita Baielr; Sarah Lagger; Nina Luyer; Pamela Manzerdorfen; Gunther Matzinger; Gerhard Mayer; Verena Menapace; Elisabeth Niedereder; Valentin Pfeil; Verena Preiner; Brenton Rowe; Roman Schmied; Anita Baielr; Carina Schrempf; Beate Schrott; Julia Schwarzinger; Benjamin Siart; Julia Siart; Dominik Siedlaczek; Christian Smetana; Christian Steinhammer; Alexandra Toth; Andreas Vojta; Susanne Walli; Veronika Watzek; Lukas Weißhaidinger; Jennifer Wenth; Eva-Maria Wimberger	Israel; Haimro Alame; Tomer Almogy; Girmaw Amare; Maya Aviezer; Noa Barlia; Itamar Bhastekar; Amit Cohen; Hai Cohen; Aviv Dayan; Olga Dogadgo; Marharyta Dorozhon; Alan Ferber; Muket Fetene; Dikla Goldenthal; Amir Hamidulin; Omri Harush; Hanna Knyazyeva-Minenko; Dmitry Kroytor; Shanie Landen; Olga Lenskiy; Itamar Levi; Danna Levin; Alexandra Lokshin; Dariya Lokshin; Anastasya Muchkayev; Noam Neeman; Imri Persiado; Margareta Pogorelov; Donald Sanford; Maor Seged; Maayan Shahaf; Itay Shamir; Azaunt Taka; Maor Tiyouri; Gilron Tsabkevich; Diana Vaisman; Kristina Vanyushev; Tom Yakubov; Evgenia Zabolotni; Victor Zagynayko; Efat Zelikovich

== Participating countries ==
The following countries are scheduled to take part in the team event.

- AASSE^{1} (18)
- Albania (15)
- Andorra (23)
- Austria (48)
- Azerbaijan (35)
- Bosnia and Herzegovina (40)
- Georgia (37)
- Israel (43)
- Luxembourg (40)
- Macedonia (30)
- Malta (36)
- Moldova (29)
- Montenegro (30)
- Slovakia (48)

^{1} Consists of athletes from San Marino (9), Gibraltar (4), Liechtenstein (4) and Monaco (1).

== Results ==
=== Score table ===
Event		AASSE	ALB	AND	AUT	AZE	BIH	GEO	ISR	LUX	MKD	MLT	MDA	MNE	SVK
100 metres	M	2	0	3	12	11	4	8	10	5	13	6	7	9	14
100 metres	W	1	6	7	11	9	4	5	14	10	2	13	8	3	12
200 metres	M	2	0	4	7	10	6	13	12	3	8	5	9	11	14
200 metres	W	1	4	5	12	8	7	6	14	10	2	11	9	3	13
400 metres	M	2	7	1	11	10	12	8	14	3	6	5	13	4	9
400 metres	W	3	4	1	13	10	9	7	8	6	5	11	12	2	14
800 metres	M	9	11	6	8	7	14	5	10	4	1	3	12	2	13
800 metres	W	1	13	4	11	12	8	5	7	14	2	6	9	3	10
1500 metres	M	7	0	5	12	14	10	3	9	8	2	4	11	6	13
1500 metres	W	2	14	7	11	0	9	8	13	12	3	5	6	4	10
3000 metres	M	8	2	4	13	14	6	5	9	11	3	7	12	1	10
3000 metres	W	5	0	4	14	12	11	2	13	8	3	6	7	9	10
5000 metres	M	0	9	5	11	14	2	8	12	6	4	7	13	3	10
5000 metres	W	5	0	0	14	13	12	7	9	10	4	6	0	8	11
3000 metre steeplechase	M	0	10	5	13	6	12	9	11	4	3	7	14	2	8
3000 metre steeplechase	W	0	0	0	11	0	13	9	12	7	0	8	14	6	10
110/100 metre hurdles	M	0	0	5	14	13	12	8	10	11	6	0	9	0	7
110/100 metre hurdles	W	0	0	4	14	9	12	0	10	11	5	7	8	6	13
400 metre hurdles	M	9	0	3	13	7	10	5	12	8	4	0	11	6	14
400 metre hurdles	W	0	3	2	14	6	9	5	10	13	8	7	11	4	12
4 × 100 metres relay	M	4	0	5	13	10	7	9	14	6	0	0	8	11	12
4 × 100 metres relay	W	0	0	7	12	11	8	0	13	0	0	10	9	6	14
4 × 400 metres relay	M	0	0	3	8	11	13	9	12	6	4	5	10	7	14
4 × 400 metres relay	W	0	0	4	13	10	7	6	9	11	5	8	12	3	14
High jump	M	9	0	4	10	8	6	11	12	7	2	4	13	4	14
High jump	W	0	0	8.5	7	6	11	13	12	10	4	3	5	14	8.5
Pole vault	M	0	0	10	13	0	7	6	12	11	0	5	9	8	14
Pole vault	W	9	0	5.5	14	11	0	7	12	13	0	5.5	8	0	10
Long jump	M	5	13	1	12	8	4	14	11	6	3	10	2	7	9
Long jump	W	0	3	4	12	10	7	11	0	8	6	13	9	5	14
Triple jump	M	5	10	2	8	14	4	11	12	3	0	7	13	6	9
Triple jump	W	0	0	7	11	12	6	10	14	4	3	8	9	5	13
Shot put	M	0	6	2	12	7	14	4	8	11	3	5	13	9	10
Shot put	W	0	0	3	7	10	8	6	12	9	5	4	13	14	11
Discus throw	M	0	0	3	14	6	12	7	11	9	4	5	13	10	8
Discus throw	W	7	0	2	10	12	9	4	11	6	5	3	14	13	8
Hammer throw	M	0	0	5	12	0	6	11	10	9	4	8	13	7	14
Hammer throw	W	0	0	7	10	13	9	0	11	8	4	5	12	6	14
Javelin throw	M	0	0	3	10	4	7	13	12	9	5	8	11	6	14
Javelin throw	W	4	0	2	13	5	11	7	14	9	3	6	12	10	8
Country		AASSE	ALB	AND	AUT	AZE	BIH	GEO	ISR	LUX	MKD	MLT	MDA	MNE	SVK
Total		100	115	163	460	353	338	285	441	319	144	246.5	403	243	459.5

=== Final standings ===
Pos	Country	Pts
1st place, gold medalist(s)	Slovakia	459.5
2nd place, silver medalist(s)	Austria	449
3rd place, bronze medalist(s)	Israel	441
4	Moldova	403
5	Azerbaijan	353
6	Bosnia and Herzegovina	338
7	Luxembourg	319
8	Georgia	285
9	Malta	246.5
10	Montenegro	243
11	Andorra	163
12	Macedonia	144
13	Albania	115
14	AASSE	100

== Doping ==
Azerbaijan's Chaltu Beji – the winner of the women's steeplechase event – was disqualified after her in-competition drug test came back positive for the banned substance ostarine.

Azerbaijan's Dzmitry Marshin was suspended for four years after he failed a drug test. This subsequent doping disqualification led to changes in final standings. Austria received an additional point and overhauled Slovakia.

In 2022 Elisabeth Niedereder of Austria had all her results since May 2015 annulled by World Athletics and Austria were docked 11 points meaning that the gold medal reverted back to Slovakia after 7 years
