= Gibraltar at the 2015 European Games =

- IOC code: GIB

in Baku, Azerbaijan 12 – 28 June 2015
- Competitors: 5 (as part of AASSE)
- Medals: Gold 0 Silver 0 Bronze 0 Total 0

European Games appearances
- 2015; 2019–2023; 2027

Gibraltar competed at the 2015 European Games, in Baku, Azerbaijan from 12 to 28 June 2015. Since Gibraltar are not members of the European Olympic Committees, Gibraltar participated for the Athletic Association of Small States of Europe.

== Athletics ==
Individual

Athlete	Event	Final		
Athlete	Event	Time	Rank	Points
Jerai Torres	Men's 100 m	11.91	13	2
Jerai Torres; Sean Collado	Men's 4 × 100 m relay	43.85	11	4
Jerai Torres; Sean Collado	Men's 4 × 400 m relay	DNS		
Laura Bevington
Laura Bevington	Women's 100 m	13.59	14	1
Zyanne Hook	Women's 200 m	26.61	14	1
Zyanne Hook	Women's 400 m	1:01.24	12	3
Alison Edwards	Women's 3000 m	11:09.54	10	5
Alison Edwards	Women's 5000 m	19:22.69	10	5

Overall

Team	Event	Final	
Team	Event	Points	Rank
AASSE	Mixed Team	99	14
