= 2015 European Games medal table =

The 2015 European Games was a multi-sport event held in Baku, Azerbaijan from 12 to 28 June 2015. The event was held for the first time and saw 5,898 athletes from 50 National Olympic Committees (NOCs) competing in 253 events in 20 sports. Since the Faroe Islands and Gibraltar are not members of the European Olympic Committee, the Faroese participants occurred for the Ligue Européenne de Natation and the Gibraltar participants for the Athletic Association of Small States of Europe. This medal table ranks the participating NOCs by the number of gold medals won by their athletes.

Athletes from 42 NOCs won medals, leaving 8 NOCs without a medal, and 31 of them won at least one gold medal. Russia led the medal table of the first European Games. They led all the medal categories, winning the most gold medals (79, more than 30% of all gold medals awarded), the most silver medals (40), the most bronze medals (45) and the most medals overall (164, nearly 20% of all medals awarded). Kosovo participated for the first time at a multi-sport event and won one bronze medal, from judo.

Baku 2015	Minsk 2019

== Medal table ==
The medal table is based on information provided by the International Olympic Committee (IOC) and is consistent with IOC convention in its published medal tables. By default, the table is ordered by the number of gold medals the athletes from a nation have won, where nation is an entity represented by a National Olympic Committee (NOC). The number of silver medals is taken into consideration next and then the number of bronze medals. If nations are still tied, equal ranking is given and they are listed alphabetically.

A total of 844 medals (253 gold, 253 silver and 339 bronze) were awarded. The total number of bronze medals is greater than the total number of gold or silver medals because two bronze medals were awarded per event in 7 sports: badminton, boxing, fencing, judo, sambo, and wrestling.

The discrepancy is also caused by a tie for the bronze medal in women's 100 metre butterfly in swimming. Thus, four medals were awarded in this event.

* Host nation (Azerbaijan)

2015 European Games medal table
Rank	NOC	Gold	Silver	Bronze	Total
1	Russia (RUS)	79	40	45	164
2	Azerbaijan (AZE)*	21	15	20	56
3	Great Britain (GBR)	18	11	18	47
4	Germany (GER)	16	17	33	66
5	France (FRA)	12	13	18	43
6	Italy (ITA)	10	26	11	47
7	Belarus (BLR)	10	11	22	43
8	Ukraine (UKR)	8	14	24	46
9	Netherlands (NED)	8	12	9	29
10	Spain (ESP)	8	11	11	30
11	Serbia (SRB)	8	4	4	16
12	Hungary (HUN)	7	4	8	19
13	Switzerland (SUI)	7	4	4	15
14	Turkey (TUR)	6	4	19	29
15	Belgium (BEL)	4	4	3	11
16	Denmark (DEN)	4	3	5	12
17	Romania (ROU)	3	5	4	12
18	Portugal (POR)	3	4	3	10
19	Poland (POL)	2	8	10	20
20	Austria (AUT)	2	7	4	13
21	Georgia (GEO)	2	6	8	16
22	Israel (ISR)	2	4	6	12
23	Slovakia (SVK)	2	2	3	7
23	Sweden (SWE)	2	2	3	7
25	Lithuania (LTU)	2	1	4	7
26	Ireland (IRL)	2	1	3	6
27	Croatia (CRO)	1	4	6	11
28	Bulgaria (BUL)	1	4	5	10
29	Greece (GRE)	1	4	4	9
30	Slovenia (SLO)	1	1	3	5
31	Latvia (LAT)	1	0	2	3
32	Czech Republic (CZE)	0	2	5	7
33	Estonia (EST)	0	1	2	3
33	Moldova (MDA)	0	1	2	3
35	San Marino (SMR)	0	1	1	2
36	Armenia (ARM)	0	1	0	1
36	Cyprus (CYP)	0	1	0	1
38	Macedonia (MKD)	0	0	2	2
38	Norway (NOR)	0	0	2	2
40	Finland (FIN)	0	0	1	1
40	Kosovo (KOS)	0	0	1	1
40	Montenegro (MNE)	0	0	1	1
Totals (42 entries)		253	253	339	845

Eight nations which failed to win any medals: Albania, Andorra, Bosnia and Herzegovina, Iceland, Liechtenstein, Luxembourg, Malta and Monaco.

== See also ==
- List of 2015 European Games medal winners
- All-time European Games medal table
