= Cycling at the 2015 European Games – Men's individual time trial =

Cycling race

Men's road time trial at the 2015 European Games
- Venue: Baku (51.6 km)
- Date: 18 June
- Competitors: 40 from 32 nations
- Winning time: 59:36.03

Medalists
gold medal	Vasil Kiryienka	Belarus
silver medal	Stef Clement	Netherlands
bronze medal	Luis León Sánchez	Spain

The men's individual time trial cycling event at the 2015 European Games in Baku took place on 18 June.

== Results ==
Rank	Rider	Nation	Time	Behind
1st place, gold medalist(s)	Vasil Kiryienka	Belarus	59:36.03	
2nd place, silver medalist(s)	Stef Clement	Netherlands	1:00:46.08	+1:10.05
3rd place, bronze medalist(s)	Luis León Sánchez	Spain	1:01:08.90	+1:32.87
4	Andriy Hryvko	Ukraine	1:01:22.63	+1:46.60
5	Rasmus Quaade	Denmark	1:01:48.68	+2:12.65
6	Anton Vorobyev	Russia	1:01:54.48	+2:18.45
7	Gatis Smukulis	Latvia	1:01:55.01	+2:18.98
8	Ryan Mullen	Ireland	1:02:17.86	+2:41.83
9	Jesús Herrada	Spain	1:02:27.67	+2:51.64
10	Kamil Gradek	Poland	1:02:39.41	+3:03.38
11	Manuele Boaro	Italy	1:02:41.12	+3:05.09
12	Ignatas Konovalovas	Lithuania	1:02:44.62	+3:08.59
13	Ilnur Zakarin	Russia	1:02:50.56	+3:14.53
14	Mateusz Taciak	Poland	1:03:07.28	+3:31.25
15	Maxime Bouet	France	1:03:15.93	+3:39.90
16	Dario Cataldo	Italy	1:03:17.25	+3:41.22
17	Reidar Borgersen	Norway	1:03:32.05	+3:56.02
18	Andriy Vasylyuk	Ukraine	1:03:49.33	+4:13.30
19	Rafael Reis	Portugal	1:04:06.74	+4:30.71
20	Jan Tratnik	Slovenia	1:04:43.83	+5:07.80
21	Alex Kirsch	Luxembourg	1:04:44.51	+5:08.48
22	Daniel Turek	Czech Republic	1:04:46.28	+5:10.25
23	Andreas Hofer	Austria	1:04:48.51	+5:12.48
24	Bruno Maltar	Croatia	1:05:12.20	+5:36.17
25	Alexis Gougeard	France	1:05:21.52	+5:45.49
26	Martin Kohler	Switzerland	1:05:23.81	+5:47.78
27	Nikolay Mihaylov	Bulgaria	1:05:43.67	+6:07.64
28	Samuel Pökälä	Finland	1:06:16.97	+6:40.94
29	Eugert Zhupa	Albania	1:06:26.84	+6:50.81
30	Sergiu Cioban	Moldova	1:07:14.12	+7:38.09
31	Josef Černý	Czech Republic	1:07:28.61	+7:52.58
32	David Albós	Andorra	1:07:45.73	+8:09.70
33	Andrei Nechita	Romania	1:07:55.15	+8:19.12
34	Gabor Kasa	Serbia	1:08:55.55	+9:19.52
35	Polychronis Tzortzakis	Greece	1:09:24.51	+9:48.48
36	Ahmet Örken	Turkey	1:10:14.44	+10:38.41
37	Anthony Turgis	France	1:10:15.51	+10:39.48
38	Giorgi Nareklishvili	Georgia	1:11:35.06	+11:59.03
39	Mujo Kurtović	Bosnia and Herzegovina	1:18:55.78	+19:19.75
	Elchin Asadov	Azerbaijan	Did not finish	
	Risto Raid	Estonia	Did not start	
