= List of Montenegrin records in athletics =

The following are the national records in athletics in Montenegro maintained by the Atletski Savez Crne Gore (ASCG).

== Outdoor ==
Key to tables: Awaiting ratification Record not kept by ASCG Not ratified or later rescinded by ASCG

=== Men ===
Event	Record	Athlete	Date	Meet	Place	Ref.
100 m	10.55 (+0.3 m/s)	Luka Rakić	13 June 2015		Celje, Slovenia	
200 m	21.44 (−0.5 m/s)	Luka Rakić	22 June 2015	European Games	Baku, Azerbaijan	
300 m	35.91	Kristian Subotić	6 October 2018		Split, Croatia	
400 m	46.82	Slaviša Vraneš	19 August 2000		Belgrade, F.R. Yugoslavia	
800 m	1:52.05	Slaviša Vraneš	16 June 1996		Niš, F.R. Yugoslavia	
1000 m	2:29.5 h	Lazar Radulović	2 August 1980		Rijeka, S.F.R. Yugoslavia	
1500 m	3:55.8 h	Muhamed Bardić	2 July 1989		Belgrade, S.F.R. Yugoslavia	
2000 m	5:49.2 h	Miloš Maslovarić	30 July 2011		Bijelo Polje, Montenegro	
3000 m	8:27.4 h	Radovan Laković	22 July 1981		Berane, S.F.R. Yugoslavia	
3000 m	8:24.06 (Note: Marks by Goran Stojiljković have been removed as he changed his citizenship again.)	Goran Stojiljković	21 June 2009		Sarajevo, Bosnia and Herzegovina	
5000 m	14:29.43	Osman Erović	10 May 1987		Nova Gorica, S.F.R. Yugoslavia	
5 km (road)	16:21.0	Miljan Kukuličić	26 March 2023		Podgorica, Montenegro	
10,000 m	30:45.0 h	Osman Erović	31 May 1987		Kumbor, S.F.R. Yugoslavia	
10 km (road)	32:28	Dragoljub Koprivica	28 March 2015		Podgorica, Montenegro	
Half marathon	1:06:15	Drago Musić	19 July 1997		Negotin, F.R. Yugoslavia	
30 km (road)	2:08:00	Aleksa Maliković	15 October 2023	38th SPAR Budapest Marathon Festival	Budapest, Hungary	
Marathon	2:24:18	Drago Musić	4 October 1998	Podgorica Marathon	Podgorica, F.R. Yugoslavia	
Marathon	2:20:11 (Note: Marks by Goran Stojiljković have been removed as he changed his citizenship again.)	Goran Stojiljković	13 April 2008	Rotterdam Marathon	Rotterdam, Netherlands	
50 km (road)	3:08:24	Dragoljub Koprivica	29 March 2009		Podgorica, Montenegro	
100 km (road)	7:57:09	Dragoljub Koprivica	11 November 2007		Podgorica, Montenegro	
110 m hurdles	14.35 (+0.3 m/s)	Darko Pešić	1 May 2023	27th International Athletics Meeting	Bar, Montenegro	
400 m hurdles	54.17	Milan Vuković	28 June 1998		Belgrade, F.R. Yugoslavia	
3000 m steeplechase	9:14.2 h	Igor Gojnić	26 May 1984		Celje, S.F.R. Yugoslavia	
High jump	2.05 m	Ljubiša Marović	24 September 1986		Titovo Užice, S.F.R. Yugoslavia	
Pole vault	4.70 m	Darko Pešić	30 April 2022	1st International Pole Vault Meeting	Bar, Montenegro	
Long jump	7.33 m (+0.4 m/s) (Note: record set during decathlon competition)	Darko Pešić	25 June 2016	Balkan Championships	Pitești, Romania	
Triple jump	14.97 m	Milorad Jovančević	24 July 1981		Berane, S.F.R. Yugoslavia	
Shot put	20.60 m	Tomaš Đurović	29 April 2021		Bar, Montenegro	
Discus throw	65.59 m	Danijel Furtula	10 April 2021		Bar, Montenegro	
Hammer throw	57.89 m	Ilija Šoškić	25 July 1962		Titograd, S.F.R. Yugoslavia	
Javelin throw	72.00 m	Amir Papazi	2 May 2024	30th International Athletics Meeting	Bar, Montenegro	
Javelin throw	74.54 m (Old design)	Mirko Vujačić	3 May 1960		Titograd, S.F.R. Yugoslavia	
Decathlon	7863 pts	Darko Pešić	6–7 May 2023		Bar, Montenegro	
Decathlon	100m (wind) / Long jump (wind) / Shot put / High jump / 400m / 110m H (wind) / Discus / Pole vault / Javelin / 1500m; 11.33 (+0.7 m/s) / 6.81 m (+0.3 m/s) / 15.75 m / 1.98 m / 50.30 / 14.68 (−0.3 m/s) / 45.77 m / 4.60 m / 60.36 m / 4:40.39					
20 km walk (road)						
35 km walk (road)						
50 km walk (road)						
4 × 100 m relay	41.12	Montenegro; Luka Rakić; Bogic Vojvodic; Scepan Cetković; Plagota Petricevic	21 June 2015	European Games	Baku, Azerbaijan	
4 × 400 m relay	3:19.87	Montenegro; Sredan Marić; Dragan Pesić; Milan Nikolić; Scapan Cetković	22 June 2015	European Games	Baku, Azerbaijan	

=== Women ===
Event	Record	Athlete	Date	Meet	Place	Ref.
100 m	12.24 (+0.8 m/s)	Milena Milašević	26 August 2007	World Championships	Osaka, Japan	
200 m	24.97 (+1.3 m/s)	Kristina Dubak	27 May 2018		Bar, Montenegro	
400 m	56.47	Danijela Srdanović	4 July 1992		Belgrade, F.R. Yugoslavia	
800 m	2:10.34	Slađana Perunović	11 July 2012		Berane, Montenegro	
1000 m	2:48.94	Slađana Perunović	11 September 2011		Bar, Montenegro	
1500 m	4:23.73	Slađana Perunović	7 August 2014		Bar, Montenegro	
2000 m	6:29.17	Slađana Perunović	31 July 2019		Berane, Montenegro	
3000 m	9:24.69	Slađana Perunović	27 July 2013		Stara Zagora, Bulgaria	
5000 m	16:25.91	Slađana Perunović	19 June 2011	European Team Championships 3rd League	Reykjavík, Iceland	
5 km (road)	15:59.4 h	Slađana Perunović	29 March 2014		Podgorica, Montenegro	
10,000 m	34:57.0 h	Slađana Perunović	13 April 2014		Bar, Montenegro	
10 km (road)	39:20.0	Slađana Perunović	22 June 2019		Brčko, Bosnia and Herzegovina	
Half marathon	1:14:38	Slađana Perunović	20 September 2015	Sarajevo Half Marathon	Sarajevo, Bosnia and Herzegovina	
25 km (road)	1:32:59+	Slađana Perunović	5 August 2012	Olympic Games	London, Great Britain	
30 km (road)	1:55:52	Slađana Perunović	8 September 2017		Ohrid, Montenegro	
30 km (road)	1:51:53+ #	Slađana Perunović	5 August 2012	Olympic Games	London, Great Britain	
Marathon	2:39:07	Slađana Perunović	5 August 2012	Olympic Games	London, Great Britain	
50 km (road)	4:45:21	Rada Miladinović	26 March 2016	16th Montenegro Ultramaraton	Podgorica, Montenegro	
100 km (road)	10:06:56	Slađana Perunović	30 November 2002		Podgorica, F.R. Yugoslavia	
100 m hurdles	14.20	Sanja Đurnić-Tripković	18 July 2007		Belgrade, Serbia	
400 m hurdles	58.36	Sanja Đurnić-Tripković	28 June 1998		Belgrade, F.R. Yugoslavia	
3000 m steeplechase	10:40.1 h	Slađana Perunović	8 June 2013		Bar, Montenegro	
High jump	1.97 m	Marija Vuković	27 June 2021	Balkan Championships	Smederevo, Serbia	
High jump	1.98 m	Marija Vuković	3 June 2026	Filothei Women Gala	Athens, Greece	
High jump	1.98 m	Marija Vuković	14 July 2026	Gyulai István Memorial	Budapest, Hungary	
High jump	1.98 m	Marija Vuković	27 August 2026	Weltklasse Zürich	Zurich, Switzerland	
Pole vault						
Long jump	6.23 m (+0.9 m/s)	Milena Milašević	8 June 2008		Bar, Montenegro	
Triple jump	12.82 m (±0.0 m/s)	Ljiljana Matović	31 May 2019		Bar, Montenegro	
Shot put	15.44 m	Kristina Rakočević	30 May 2019		Bar, Montenegro	
Discus throw	58.30 m	Kristina Rakočević	16 April 2016	Easter Meeting	Split, Croatia	
Hammer throw	48.67 m	Ana Bošković	27 July 2019		Danilovgrad, Montenegro	
Javelin throw	54.77 m	Marija Bogavac	18 March 2016	Emory Invitational	Atlanta, United States	
Heptathlon	4932 pts	Andjela Drobnjak	25–26 May 2024	Balkan Championships	İzmir, Turkey	
Heptathlon	100m H (wind) / High jump / Shot put / 200m (wind) / Long jump (wind) / Javelin / 800m; 14.47 (±0.0 m/s) / 1.61 m / 10.36 m / 25.62 (+1.9 m/s) / 5.60 m (−0.5 m/s) / 29.44 m / 2:29.90					
20 km walk (road)						
50 km walk (road)						
4 × 100 m relay	49.01	Montenegro; Amra Hubanić; Mare Jablan; Iva Djoković; Andjela Drobnjak	24 June 2025	European Team Championships	Maribor, Slovenia	
4 × 400 m relay	3:54.46	Montenegro; Sanja Đurnić-Tripković; Danijela Drobnjak; Jadranka Perutović; Danijela Srdanović	5 July 1992		Belgrade, F.R. Yugoslavia	

=== Mixed ===
Event	Record	Athlete	Date	Meet	Place	Ref.
4 × 400 m relay	3:42.91	Montenegro; Dragan Pešić; Mia Milašinović; Nemanja Džaković; Anabela Mujovi	22 June 2023	European Team Championships	Chorzów, Poland	

== Indoor ==
=== Men ===
Event	Record	Athlete	Date	Meet	Place	Ref.
50 m	6.65	Momir Matović	21 January 2011		Novi Sad, Serbia	
60 m	6.80	Luka Rakić	14 February 2015	Slovenian Championships	Ljubljana, Slovenia	
200 m	21.77	Luka Rakić	31 January 2015	Track & Field Vienna	Vienna, Austria	
300 m	36.43	Kristian Subotić	24 February 2018		Belgrade, Serbia	
400 m	49.74	Srđan Marić	21 February 2018	Serbian Open Indoor Meeting	Belgrade, Serbia	
800 m	1:55.22	Ilija Ranitović	21 February 2009		Piraeus, Greece	
1000 m	2:38.23 (Note: record set during heptathlon competition)	Darko Pešić	5 March 2017	European Championships	Belgrade, Serbia	
1500 m	4:06.78	Miloš Dragović	2 February 2019		Belgrade, Serbia	
3000 m	8:59.06	Miloš Dragović	19 January 2019		Belgrade, Serbia	
60 m hurdles	7.99 (Note: record set during heptathlon competition)	Darko Pešić	5 March 2017	European Championships	Belgrade, Serbia	
High jump	2.08 m (Note: record set during heptathlon competition)	Darko Pešić	6 February 2021	Serbian Championships	Belgrade, Serbia	
Pole vault	4.72 m (Note: outdoor mark ratified as absolute record)	Darko Pešić	18 February 2017		Belgrade, Serbia	
Long jump	7.24 m (Note: record set during heptathlon competition)	Darko Pešić	6 February 2021	Serbian Championships	Belgrade, Serbia	
Triple jump	14.37 m	Kristijan Matković	19 January 2014	Belgrade Junior Championship	Belgrade, Serbia	
Shot put	19.08 m	Tomaš Đurović	25 February 2017	Balkan Championships	Belgrade, Serbia	
Heptathlon	6036 pts	Darko Pešić	6−7 February 2021	Serbian Championships	Belgrade, Serbia	
Heptathlon	60m / Long jump / Shot put / High jump / 60m H / Pole vault / 1000m; 7.19 / 7.24 m / 16.69 m / 2.08 m / 8.12 / 4.60 m / 2:43.47					
5000 m walk						
4 × 200 m relay	1:36.73	AK Mornar Bar; Luiđi Mazreku; Alan Ramdedović; Danijel Maljević; Kristijan Subotić		28 January 2017	Belgrade, Serbia	
4 × 400 m relay	3:41.87	AK Mornar Bar; Danilo Vujičić; Ognjen Vojvodić; Ognen Barać; Maljević		28 January 2018	Belgrade, Serbia	

=== Women ===
Event	Record	Athlete	Date	Meet	Place	Ref.
50 m	7.41	Ljiljana Matović	21 January 2011		Novi Sad, Serbia	
50 m	7.1 h	Dragica Šćekić	23 March 1969		Belgrade, F.R. Yugoslavia	
60 m	7.88	Milena Milašević	24 January 2009		Belgrade, Serbia	
200 m	27.32	Marija Kontić	29 January 2017	Serbian Championships	Belgrade, Serbia	
400 m	57.53	Jovana Kljajević	21 February 2007		Piraeus, Greece	
800 m	2:25.02	Dejana Sošić	9 February 2008	15th Balkan Championships	Athens, Greece	
1500 m	4:38.27	Slađana Perunović	9 February 2008	15th Balkan Championships	Athens, Greece	
3000 m	9:30.60	Slađana Perunović	22 February 2014	19th Balkan Championships	Istanbul, Turkey	
60 m hurdles	9.13 (Note: record set during pentathlon competition)	Andjela Drobnjak	18 January 2025 (Note: by World Athletics source; 19 January 2025 by ASCG source)	Serbian Combined Events Championships	Belgrade, Serbia	
60 m hurdles	9.0 h	Sanja Đurnić-Tripković	18 February 1996		Belgrade, F.R. Yugoslavia	
High jump	1.96 m	Marija Vuković	15 February 2022	28. Banskobystrická latka	Banská Bystrica, Slovakia	
Pole vault						
Long jump	5.99 m	Milena Milašević	9 February 2008	15th Balkan Championships	Athens, Greece	
Triple jump	11.89 m	Ljiljana Matović	15 January 2017	Championship of Vojvodina	Novi Sad, Serbia	
Shot put	15.07 m	Kristina Rakočević	12 February 2017	1st Balkan Indoor U20 Championships	Istanbul, Turkey	
Pentathlon	3308 pts	Danijela Pešić	4–5 February 2017	Serbian Championships	Belgrade, Serbia	
Pentathlon	60m H / High jump / Shot put / Long jump / 800m; 9.49 / 1.58 m / 11.27 m / 5.06 m / 2:37.88					
3000 m walk						
4 × 200 m relay	1:53.02	AK Mornar Bar; Sara Ratknić; Andrea Matković; Gabrijela Ćetković; Marija Kontić		28 January 2017	Belgrade, Serbia	
4 × 400 m relay	4:23.52	AK Mornar Bar; Sara Ratknić; Gabrijela Ćetković; Andrea Matković; Marija Kontić		29 January 2017	Belgrade, Serbia	
