= Malta at the European Games =

- IOC code: MLT
- NOC: Malta Olympic Committee
- Website: nocmalta.org (in English)
- Medals: Gold 0 Silver 0 Bronze 0 Total 0

European Games appearances (overview)
- 2015; 2019; 2023; 2027

Malta participated at the inaugural edition of the European Games in 2015. However, Malta is one of the four nations that have yet to win a medal at the European Games.

== Medal tables ==
=== Medals by Games ===
Games	Athletes	Gold	Silver	Bronze	Total	Rank
(Azerbaijan) 2015 Baku	61	0	0	0	0	–
(Belarus) 2019 Minsk	4	0	0	0	0	–
(Poland) 2023 Kraków-Małopolska	36	0	0	0	0	–
(Turkey) 2027 Istanbul	Future event					
Total		0	0	0	0	–

== See also ==
- Malta at the Olympics
