= Liechtenstein at the 2015 European Games =

- IOC code: LIE
- NOC: Liechtenstein Olympic Committee

in Baku, Azerbaijan 12 – 28 June 2015
- Competitors: 10 in 4 sports
- Medals: Gold 0 Silver 0 Bronze 0 Total 0

European Games appearances (overview)
- 2015; 2019; 2023; 2027

Liechtenstein competed at the 2015 European Games, in Baku, Azerbaijan from 12 to 28 June 2015.

== Archery ==
Athlete	Event	Ranking round		Round of 64	Round of 32	Round of 16	Quarterfinals	Semifinals	Final / BM	
Athlete	Event	Score	Seed	Opposition Score	Opposition Score	Opposition Score	Opposition Score	Opposition Score	Opposition Score	Rank
Marvin Grischke	Men's individual	603	60	Kahllund (Germany); L 0–6	Did not advance					33

== Athletics ==
Individual

Athlete	Event	Final		
Athlete	Event	Time	Rank	Points
Fabian Haldner	Men's 200 m	23.49	13	2
Fabian Haldner	Men's 400 m	51.71	13	2
Simon Hassler
Simon Hassler	Men's Shot Put	DNS		
Olivia Bissegger	Women's 800 m	2:30.64	14	1
Olivia Bissegger	Women's 1500 m	5:05.26	14	1
Laura Rheinberger	Women's Discus	35.89	8	7

Overall

Team	Event	Final	
Team	Event	Points	Rank
AASSE	Mixed Team	99	14

== Judo ==
Athlete	Event	Round of 32	Round of 16	Quarterfinals	Semifinals	Repechage	Final / BM	
Athlete	Event	Opposition Result	Opposition Result	Opposition Result	Opposition Result	Opposition Result	Opposition Result	Rank
David Büchel	Men's −100 kg	Paltchik (ISR); L 112—0s2	Did not advance					R32
Judith Biedermann	Women's −52 kg	Gomez (ESP); L 100—0	Did not advance					R32

== Swimming ==
Men

Athlete	Event	Heat		Semifinal		Final	
Athlete	Event	Time	Rank	Time	Rank	Time	Rank
Tarik Hoch	50 m freestyle	26.12	59	Did not advance			
Tarik Hoch	50 m backstroke	29.86	42	Did not advance			
Tarik Hoch	100 m backstroke	1:04.56	50	Did not advance			
Tarik Hoch	200 m backstroke	2:20.24	39	Did not advance			

== Synchronised swimming ==
Athlete	Event	Qualification Free Routine		Final	
Athlete	Event	Points	Rank	Points	Rank
Lara Mechnig	Solo	148.4515 Q	10	150.3849	9
Lara Mechnig; Marluce Schierscher	Duet	142.3228 R	13	Did not advance	
