= Liechtenstein at the 2019 European Games =

- IOC code: LIE
- NOC: Liechtenstein Olympic Committee
- Website: www.olympic.li

in Minsk, Belarus 21–30 June
- Competitors: 1 in 1 sport
- Medals Ranked 44th: Gold 0 Silver 0 Bronze 0 Total 0

European Games appearances (overview)
- 2015; 2019; 2023; 2027

Liechtenstein competed at the 2019 European Games in Minsk from 21 to 30 June 2019. Liechtenstein was represented by 1 athlete.

== Competitors ==
Sport	Men	Women	Total
Judo	1	0	1
Total	1	0	1

== Judo ==
Men

Athlete	Event	Round of 64	Round of 32	Round of 16	Quarterfinals	Semifinals	Repechage	Final / BM	
Athlete	Event	Opposition Result	Opposition Result	Opposition Result	Opposition Result	Opposition Result	Opposition Result	Opposition Result	Rank
Raphael Schwendinger	–90 kg	Bye	Kochman (ISR); L 0s1–10	did not advance					
