= Luka Rakić =

Montenegrin sprinter

Personal information
- Nationality: Montenegrin
- Born: August 2, 1991 (age 34) Podgorica, Montenegro, Yugoslavia
- Height: 176 cm (5 ft 9 in)
- Weight: 70 kg (154 lb)

Sport
- Sport: Track
- Event(s): 100 metres, 200 metres
- Club: AK Mornar Bar, AD Mass Ljubljana

Achievements and titles
- Personal best(s): 100 metres: 10.55; 200 meters: 21.44
- Updated on 3-16-15

Luka Rakić (born 2 August 1991) is a Montenegrin sprinter who specializes in the 200 meters. He participated for Montenegro at the 2011 World Championships in Athletics. He holds multiple Montenegrin records in athletics. He has been called the "pearl" of Montenegrin athletics by his country's press.

== Running career ==
Rakić made his major international debut at the 2011 World Championships in Daegu, South Korea. He finished second to last in the men's 200 meters. At the 2014 European Team Championships, Rakić placed second overall in the Third League men's 100 meters.

== Competition record ==
Year	Competition	Venue	Position	Event	Notes
Representing Montenegro
2011	World Championships	Daegu, South Korea	52nd (h)	200 m	22.73
2015	European Indoor Championships	Prague, Czech Republic	31st (h)	60 m	6.87
2015	Games of the Small States of Europe	Reykjavík, Iceland	5th	100 m	10.89
2015	Games of the Small States of Europe	Reykjavík, Iceland	3rd	200 m	21.84
2015	European Games (Note: The third league of the 2015 European Team Championships)	Baku, Azerbaijan	6th	100 m	10.79
2015	European Games	Baku, Azerbaijan	4th	200 m	21.44 NR
2015	European Games	Baku, Azerbaijan	4th	4 × 100 m relay	41.12 NR
2015	World Championships	Beijing, China	50th (h)	200 m	21.86
2019	Games of the Small States of Europe	Budva, Montenegro	11th (h)	100 m	11.24
2019	Games of the Small States of Europe	Budva, Montenegro	9th (h)	200 m	22.74
2019	Games of the Small States of Europe	Budva, Montenegro	2nd	4 x 100 m relay	42.51
