= Malta at the 2019 European Games =

- IOC code: MLT
- NOC: Malta Olympic Committee
- Website: www.nocmalta.org

in Minsk, Belarus 21–30 June
- Competitors: 4 in 3 sports
- Medals Ranked 44th: Gold 0 Silver 0 Bronze 0 Total 0

European Games appearances (overview)
- 2015; 2019; 2023; 2027

Malta competed at the 2019 European Games in Minsk from 21 to 30 June 2019. Malta is represented by 4 athletes in 3 sports.

== Competitors ==
Sport	Men	Women	Total
Cycling	1	0	1
Judo	1	0	1
Shooting	0	2	2
Total	2	2	2

== Cycling ==
=== Road ===
Men

Athlete	Event	Time	Rank
Alexander Smyth	Road race	4:16:43	95

== Judo ==
Men

Athlete	Event	Round of 64	Round of 32	Round of 16	Quarterfinals	Semifinals	Repechage	Final / BM	
Athlete	Event	Opposition Result	Opposition Result	Opposition Result	Opposition Result	Opposition Result	Opposition Result	Opposition Result	Rank
Jeremy Saywell	–66 kg	Bye	Zantaraia (UKR); L 0–11	did not advance					

== Shooting ==
Women

Athlete	Event	Qualification		Final	
Athlete	Event	Points	Rank	Points	Rank
Eleanor Bezzina	25 m pistol	565	30	did not advance	
Mikaela Galea	Trap	89	28	did not advance	
