= Monaco at the 2015 European Games =

- IOC code: MON
- NOC: Monégasque Olympic Committee

in Baku, Azerbaijan 12 – 28 June 2015
- Competitors: 5 in 4 sports

European Games appearances (overview)
- 2015; 2019; 2023; 2027

Monaco competed at the 2015 European Games, in Baku, Azerbaijan from 12 to 28 June 2015.

== Athletics ==
Men

Athlete	Event	Final		
Athlete	Event	Time	Rank	Points
Brice Etes	800 m			

Overall

Team	Event	Final	
Team	Event	Points	Rank
AASSE	Mixed Team		

== Cycling ==
=== Road ===
Men

Athlete	Event	Time	Rank
Victor Langelloti	Road race		
Victor Langelloti	Time trial	Did not finish	

== Diving ==
Men

Athlete	Event	Preliminaries		Final	
Athlete	Event	Points	Rank	Points	Rank
Ian-Soren Cabioch	1 m springboard	328.55	27	Did not advance	
Ian-Soren Cabioch	3 m springboard	336.25	31	Did not advance	

== Judo ==
Men

Athlete	Event	Round of 64	Round of 32	Round of 16	Quarterfinals	Semifinals	Repechage	Final / BM	
Athlete	Event	Opposition Result	Opposition Result	Opposition Result	Opposition Result	Opposition Result	Opposition Result	Opposition Result	Rank
Yann Siccardi	Men's −60 kg	—	Bagirov (Belarus); L 000-10s1	Did not advance					
Cedric Bessi	Men's −73 kg	—	Gusic (Montenegro); L 010-100	Did not advance					
