= Bosnia and Herzegovina at the 2015 European Games =

- IOC code: BIH
- NOC: Olympic Committee of Bosnia and Herzegovina
- Website: www.okbih.ba

in Baku, Azerbaijan 12 – 28 June 2015
- Competitors: 53 in 8 sports
- Flag bearer: Admir Duranspahić
- Medals: Gold 0 Silver 0 Bronze 0 Total 0

European Games appearances (overview)
- 2015; 2019; 2023; 2027

Bosnia and Herzegovina competed at the 2015 European Games, in Baku, Azerbaijan from 12 to 28 June 2015.

== Competitors ==
Sport	Men	Women	Total
Athletics	19	17	36
Boxing	4	0	4
Canoe sprint	1	1	2
Cycling	2	1	3
Judo	1	2	3
Shooting	0	1	1
Swimming	2	1	3
Table tennis	1	0	1
Total	30	23	53

== Athletics ==
Bosnia and Herzegovina finished the competition at 6th position overall with total of 338 points.

Men
Track & road events

Athlete	Event	Time	Rank	Points
Sait Huseinbašić	100 m	11.12	11	4
Borislav Dragoljević	200 m	22.15	9	6
Borislav Dragoljević	400 m	47.89	3	12
Amel Tuka	800 m	1:50.16	1	14
Dušan Babić	1500 m	3:52.09	5	10
Stefan Ćuković	3000 m	8:53.93	9	6
Srđan Samardžić	5000 m	16:36.42	13	2
Mahir Kurtalić	110 m hurdles	14.43	3	12
Rusmir Malkočević	400 m hurdles	53.59	5	10
Osman Junuzović	3000 m steeplechase	8:54.55	3	12
Dejan Raseta; Borislav Dragoljević; Nikola Brkić; Sait Huseinbašić	4 × 100 m relay	41.85	8	7
Rusmir Malkočević; Semir Avdić; Borislav Dragoljević; Amel Tuka	4 × 400 m relay	3:10.50	2	13

Field events

Athlete	Event	Result	Rank	Points
Nikola Brkić	Long jump	6.76	11	4
Anes Hodžić	Triple jump	13.51	11	4
Samir Hodžić	High jump	1.95	9	6
Goran Pejić	Pole vault	3.50	8	7
Hamza Alić	Shot put	20.26	1	14
Kemal Mešić	Discus throw	50.26	3	12
Dejan Mileusnić	Jawelin throw	62.57	8	7
Zlatan Šeranić	Hammer throw	36.93	9	6

Women
Track & road events

Athlete	Event	Time	Rank	Points
Ksenija Kecman	100 m	12.70	11	4
Kanita Bilić	200 m	25.39	8	7
Milica Ožegović	400 m	56.36	6	9
Vladana Gavranović	800 m	2:09.45	7	8
Vladana Gavranović	1500 m	4:34.32	6	9
Lucia Kimani	3000 m	9:55.34	4	11
Lucia Kimani	5000 m	16:47.13	3	12
Gorana Cvijetić	100 m hurdles	14.11	3	12
Gorana Cvijetić	400 m hurdles	1:02.83	6	9
Rahima Zukić	3000 m steeplechase	10:59.76	2	13
Anja Erceg; Nikolija Stanivuković; Svjetlana Graorac; Ivana Macanović	4 × 100 m relay	48.17	7	8
Ivana Macanović; Kanita Bilić; Vladana Gavranović; Milica Ožegović	4 × 400 m relay	3:51.13	7	8

Field events

Athlete	Event	Result	Rank	Points
Tanja Marković	Long jump	5.50	8	7
Melika Kasumović	Triple jump	11.53	9	6
Mladena Petrušić	High jump	1.84	3	12
Gorana Tešanović	Shot put	12.94	7	8
Gorana Tešanović	Discus throw	44.70	6	9
Aleksandra Vidović	Jawelin throw	44.79	4	11
Stefani Vukajlović	Hammer throw	49.53	6	9

== Boxing ==
Athlete	Event	Round of 32	Round of 16	Quarterfinals	Semifinals	Final	
Athlete	Event	Opposition Result	Opposition Result	Opposition Result	Opposition Result	Opposition Result	Rank
Adem Fetahović	64 kg	Bye	Niculescu (ROU); L 0–3	did not advance			
Đorđe Tomić	75 kg	Pivorun (LTU); L 0–3	did not advance				
Džemal Bošnjak	81 kg	Kalamaras (GRE); W 3–0	Abdourachidov (FRA); W 2–1	Manfredonia (ITA); L 1–2	did not advance		
Alem Čolpa	91 kg	Bye	Omba-Biongolo (FRA); L 0–3	did not advance			

== Canoe sprint ==
Men

Athlete	Event	Heats		Semifinal		Final	
Athlete	Event	Time	Rank	Time	Rank	Time	Rank
Darko Savić	K-1 1000 m	3:53.614	7	did not advance			
Darko Savić	K-1 5000 m	—				22:53.688	19

Women

Athlete	Event	Heats		Semifinal		Final	
Athlete	Event	Time	Rank	Time	Rank	Time	Rank
Olga Babić	K-1 200 m	did not start					

== Cycling ==
=== Mountain biking ===
Athlete	Event	Time	Rank
Aleksa Crnčević	Cross country	LAP	36

=== Road ===
Men

Athlete	Event	Time	Rank
Mujo Kurtović	Road race	did not finish	
Mujo Kurtović	Time trial	1:18:55.78	39

Women

Athlete	Event	Time	Rank
Lejla Tanović	Road race	did not finish	

== Judo ==
Men

Athlete	Event	Round of 32	Round of 16	Quarterfinals	Semifinals	Repechage	Final / BM	
Athlete	Event	Opposition Result	Opposition Result	Opposition Result	Opposition Result	Opposition Result	Opposition Result	Rank
Harun Sadiković	+100 kg	Paskevicius (LTU); L 0s2–101s2	did not advance					

Women

Athlete	Event	Round of 32	Round of 16	Quarterfinals	Semifinals	Repechage	Final / BM	
Athlete	Event	Opposition Result	Opposition Result	Opposition Result	Opposition Result	Opposition Result	Opposition Result	Rank
Aleksandra Samardžić	–70 kg	Conway (GBR); L 0s2–100	did not advance					
Larisa Cerić	+78 kg	Bye	Kaya (TUR); L 0–101	did not advance				

== Shooting ==
Athlete	Event	Qualification		Final	
Athlete	Event	Points	Rank	Points	Rank
Tatjana Đekanović	10 m air rifle	406.7	35	did not advance	

== Swimming ==
Men

Athlete	Event	Heat		Semifinal		Final	
Athlete	Event	Time	Rank	Time	Rank	Time	Rank
Adi Mešetović	50 m freestyle	23.91	36	did not advance			
Adi Mešetović	100 m freestyle	53.17	51	did not advance			
Adi Mešetović	50 m butterfly	25.10	25	did not advance			
Maid Sukanović	50 m freestyle	24.76	51	did not advance			
Maid Sukanović	100 m freestyle	54.01	59	did not advance			
Maid Sukanović	50 m butterfly	25.98	51	did not advance			
Maid Sukanović	100 m butterfly	58.22	52	did not advance			

Women

Athlete	Event	Heat		Semifinal		Final	
Athlete	Event	Time	Rank	Time	Rank	Time	Rank
Lamija Medošević	50 m freestyle	31.50	50	did not advance			
Lamija Medošević	100 m freestyle	1:00.19	55	did not advance			
Lamija Medošević	200 m freestyle	2:12.41	51	did not advance			
Lamija Medošević	400 m freestyle	4:43.73	44	did not advance			
Lamija Medošević	100 m backstroke	1:09.95	37	did not advance			
Lamija Medošević	200 m backstroke	2:29.59	32	did not advance			
Lamija Medošević	50 m butterfly	31.50	50	did not advance			

== Table tennis ==
Athlete	Event	Round 1	Round 2	Round 3	Quarterfinals	Semifinals	Final / BM	
Athlete	Event	Opposition Result	Opposition Result	Opposition Result	Opposition Result	Opposition Result	Opposition Result	Rank
Admir Duranspahić	Men's singles	Tan (CRO); W 4–3	Pitchford (GBR); L 2–4	did not advance				
