= Milena Milašević =

Montenegrin athlete

Milena Milasevic (born 11 February 1984 in Cetinje) is a track and field athlete who competes internationally for Montenegro in sprinting events and the long jump.

Milasevic represented Montenegro at the 2008 Summer Olympics in Beijing. She competed at the 100 metres sprint and placed eighth in her heat without advancing to the second round. She ran the distance in a time of 12.65 seconds.
