= Ekemini Bassey =

Austrian bobsledder

Personal information
- Nationality: Austrian
- Born: 22 October 1987 (age 37)

Sport
- Sport: Bobsleigh

Ekemini Bassey (born 22 October 1987) is an Austrian bobsledder. He competed in the four-man event at the 2018 Winter Olympics.

He is also a sprinter.
