= Jerai Torres =

Gibraltarian sprinter

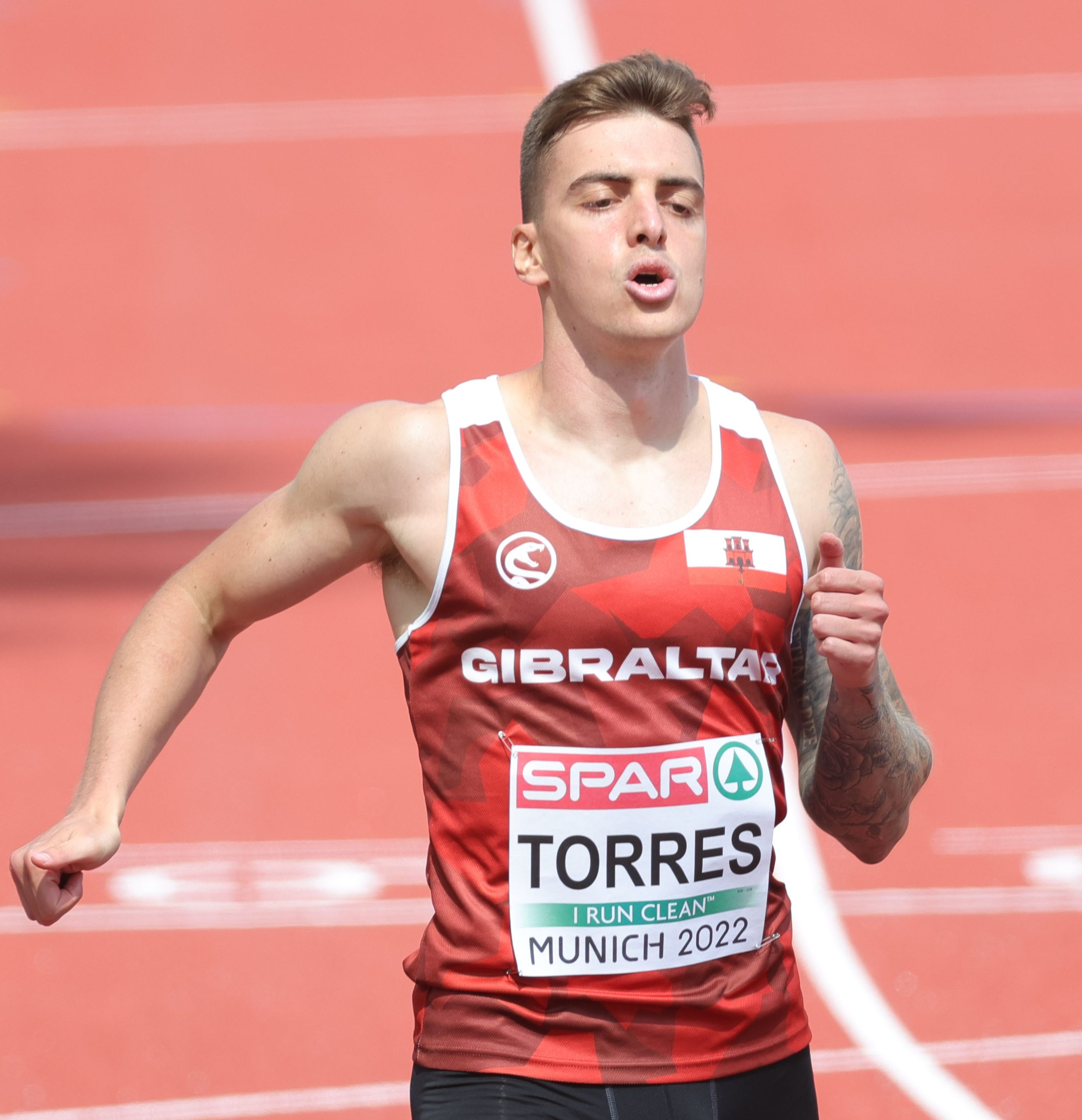

Personal information
- Born: 25 May 1994 (age 32) Gibraltar
- Height: 1.85 m (6 ft 1 in)
- Weight: 85 kg (187 lb)

Sport
- Country: Gibraltar
- Sport: Athletics
- Event(s): 100m, 200m, 400m
- Coached by: Hector Romero
- Updated on 29 August 2015

Jerai Torres (born 25 May 1994) is a male Gibraltarian sprinter. He represented his country in the 200 metres at the 2013 and 2015 World Championships in Athletics without advancing from the first round.

== International competitions ==
Year	Competition	Venue	Position	Event	Notes
Representing Gibraltar
2011	World Youth Championships	Lille, France	65th (h)	200 m	23.16
2011	European Junior Championships	Tallinn, Estonia	26th (h)	400 m	52.52
2011	Commonwealth Youth Games	Douglas, Isle of Man	15th (sf)	200 m	23.25 (w)
2012	European Championships	Helsinki, Finland	29th (h)	200 m	22.31
2012	World Junior Championships	Barcelona, Spain	57th (h)	200 m	22.29
2013	World Championships	Moscow, Russia	55th (h)	200 m	22.98
2014	Commonwealth Games	Glasgow, United Kingdom	69th (h)	100 m	11.54
2014	Commonwealth Games	Glasgow, United Kingdom	66th (h)	200 m	22.95
2015	World Championships	Beijing, China	53rd (h)	200 m	22.77
2018	Commonwealth Games	Gold Coast, Queensland	56th (h)	200 m	22.23
2018	Commonwealth Games	Gold Coast, Queensland	38th (h)	400 m	49.40
2022	European Championships	Munich, Germany	23rd (h)	200 m	22.70

== Personal bests ==
- 100 metres – 10.91 (+1.1 m/s, Malaga 2018)
- 200 metres – 21.71 (+0.7 m/s, Elche 2018)
- 400 metres – 49.32 (Barcelona 2018)
