= Andorra at the 2015 European Games =

- IOC code: AND
- NOC: Andorran Olympic Committee

in Baku, Azerbaijan 12 – 28 June 2015
- Competitors: 30 in 5 sports
- Medals: Gold 0 Silver 0 Bronze 0 Total 0

European Games appearances (overview)
- 2015; 2019; 2023; 2027

Andorra competed at the 2015 European Games, in Baku, Azerbaijan from 12 to 28 June 2015.

== Team ==
Competitors from Andorra per sport
Sport	Men	Women	Total
3x3 Basketball	4	0	4
Athletics	13	10	23
Cycling road	1	0	1
Judo	0	1	1
Swimming	1	0	1
Total	18	12	30

== Athletics ==
Andorra finished in eleventh place with 163 points.

=== Men's ===
Athlete	Event	Time	Rank	Points
Athlete	Event	Result	Rank	Points
Mikel de Sa	100m	11.52	11	3
Mikel de Sa	200m	22.94	11	4
Daniel Maciel	400m	56.12	14	1
Pol Moya	1500m	4:04.55	10	5
Manuel Fernandes	3000m	9:02.65	11	4
Manuel Fernandes	5000m	15:29.56	10	5
Josep Sansa	3000m steeplechase	9:50.06	10	5
Josep Sansa	400m hurdles	1:04.17	12	3
Leonard Sangra	110m hurdles	18.74	10	5
Mikel de Sa; Moises Miret; Leonard Sangra; Miquel Vilchez	4x100m relay	43.85	11	4
Mikel de Sa; Daniel Maciel; Pol Moya; Miquel Vilchez	4x400m relay	3:36.47	12	3
Moises Miret	High jump	1.75	=10	4
Moises Miret	Long jump	5.86	14	1
Moises Miret	Triple jump	11.85	13	2
Miquel Vilchez	Pole vault	4.70	5	10
Unai Olea Perez	Discus throw	37.58	12	3
Unai Olea Perez	Shot put	10.87	13	2
Rodrigo Llados	Hammer throw	35.72	10	5
Rodrigo Llados	Javelin throw	35.84	12	3

=== Women's ===
Athlete	Event	Time	Rank	Points
Athlete	Event	Result	Rank	Points
Cristina Llovera	100m	12.34	8	7
Cristina Llovera	200m	25.61	10	5
Maria Morato Canabate	400m	1:07.92	14	1
Laia Isus Vilaprino	800m	2:20.75	11	4
Laia Isus Vilaprino	1500m	4:46.10	8	7
Silvia Felipo Sune	3000m	11:31.43	11	4
Silvia Felipo Sune	5000m	DNS		0
Ainara Revuelta Pellicer	110m hurdles	18.72	11	4
Ainara Revuelta Pellicer	400m hurdles	1:11.72	13	2
Cristina Llovera; Claudia Guri; Maria Gomez Cabeza; Maria Morato Canabate	4x100m relay	50.76	8	7
Cristina Llovera; Ainara Revuelta Pellicer; Maria Gomez Cabeza; Maria Morato Canabate	4x400m relay	4:17.57	10	5
Claudia Guri	High jump	1.74	=6	8.5
Claudia Guri	Long jump	5.27	12	4
Claudia Guri	Triple jump	11.90	8	7
Maria Gomez Cabeza	Pole vault	2.00	=9	5.5
Maria Gomez Cabeza	Shot put	7.41	12	3
Elena Villalon Aguado	Discus throw	21.27	13	2
Elena Villalon Aguado	Hammer throw	36.81	8	7
Maria Morato Canabate	Javelin throw	17.58	13	2

== Basketball ==
Team	Event	Round of 16	Quarterfinal	Semifinal	Final / BM	
Team	Event	Opposition Score	Opposition Score	Opposition Score	Opposition Score	Rank
Rafa Casals; Oriol Fernandez; Cinto Gabriel; Albert Ros	Men's tournament	Lithuania (LTU); L 14–19	did not advance			

== Cycling ==
Athlete	Event	Time	Rank
David Albós	Men's road race	DNF	
David Albós	Men's time trial	1:07:45.73	32

== Judo ==
Athlete	Event	Round of 32	Round of 16	Quarterfinals	Semifinals	Repechage	Final / BM	
Athlete	Event	Opposition Result	Opposition Result	Opposition Result	Opposition Result	Opposition Result	Opposition Result	Rank
Laura Sallés	Women's 63kg	Milošević (SLO); L 000-001	did not advance					

== Swimming ==
Athlete	Event	Heat		Semifinal		Final	
Athlete	Event	Time	Rank	Time	Rank	Time	Rank
Eric Fernández Malvar	Men's 50m freestyle	24.82	52	did not advance			
Eric Fernández Malvar	Men's 100m freestyle	55.58	62	did not advance			
