= Cristina Llovera =

Andorran sprinter

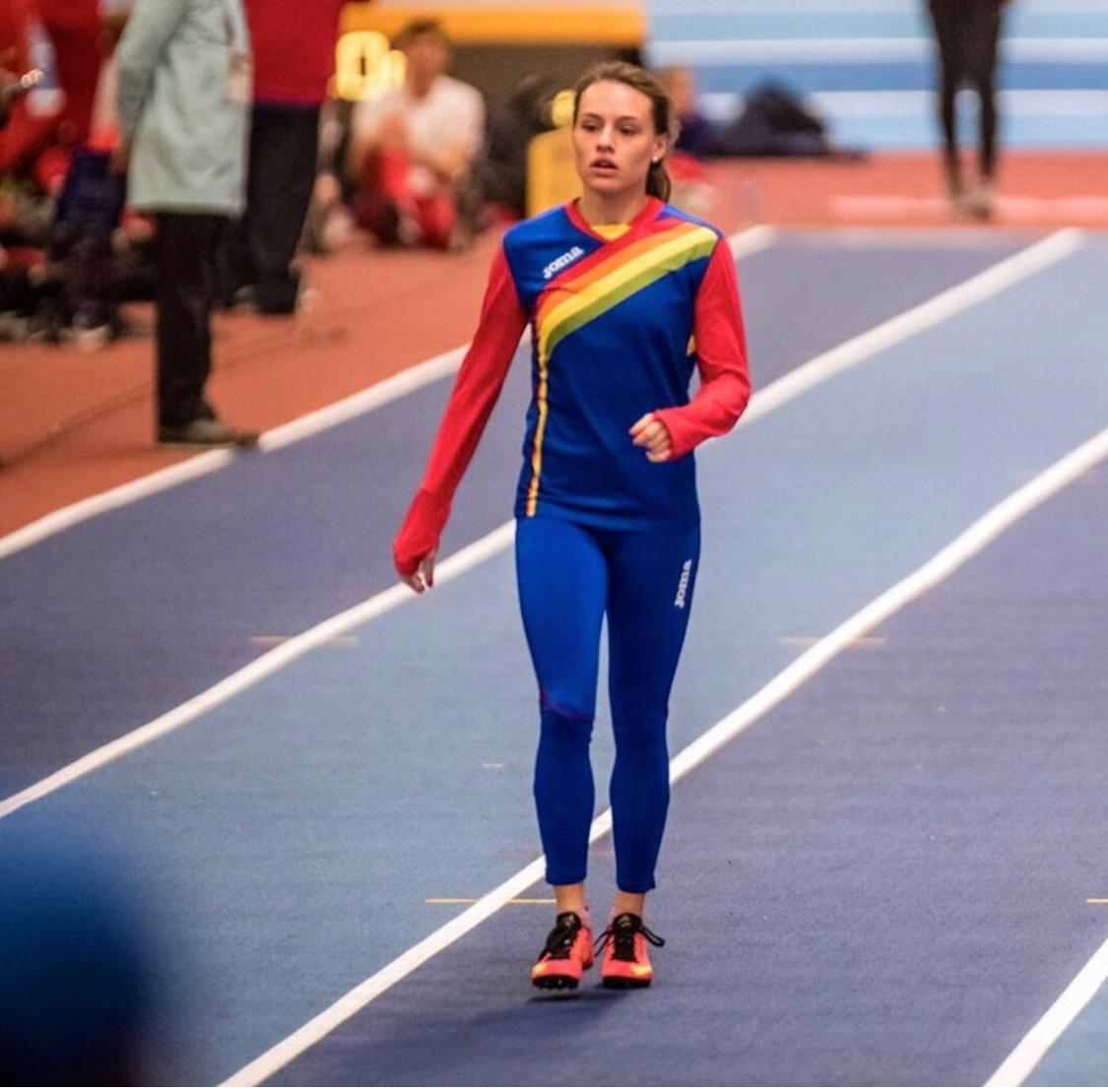

Personal information
- Full name: Cristina Llovera Rossell
- Born: 1 October 1996 (age 29) Andorra la Vella, Andorra

Sport
- Country: Andorra
- Sport: Athletics
- Event: 100 metres

Achievements and titles
- Personal best: 12.73 (London 2012)
- Updated on 15 August 2012

Cristina Llovera Rossell (Note: In this Catalan name, the first or paternal surname is Llovera and the second or maternal family name is Rossell; both are generally joined by the conjunction "i".) (born 1 October 1996 in Andorra la Vella) is an Andorran runner. She competed at the 2012 Summer Olympics in the Women's 100 metres where she was eliminated in the preliminary round. Llovera was the youngest participant in the Athletics competition.

In 2016 an injury deprived her of repeating that experience in Rio de Janeiro's Olympic Games. Two months before the event se had a spondylosis, a small fracture in a vertebra, which left her without options.
