= Mikel de Sa =

Andorran sprinter

Personal information
- Born: 6 July 1990 (age 35) Andorra

Sport
- Sport: Track and field
- Event: 100m

Mikel de Sa Gomes (born 6 July 1990) is an Andorran sprinter. He competed in the 100 metres event at the 2013 World Championships in Athletics. He currently holds the Andorran record on the 100 meters outdoor U23, setting 11"20 in Barcelona in 2012.
