= Montenegro at the 2015 European Games =

- IOC code: MNE
- NOC: Montenegrin Olympic Committee
- Website: www.cok.me

in Baku, Azerbaijan 12 – 28 June 2015
- Competitors: 55
- Flag bearer: Boško Drašković
- Medals Ranked 40th: Gold 0 Silver 0 Bronze 1 Total 1

European Games appearances (overview)
- 2015; 2019; 2023; 2027

Montenegro competed at the 2015 European Games, in Baku, Azerbaijan from 12 to 28 June 2015.

== Medalists ==
Medal	Name	Sport	Event	Date
Bronze	Marina Raković	Karate	Women's 68kg	14 June
