= Albania at the 2015 European Games =

- IOC code: ALB
- NOC: Albanian National Olympic Committee
- Website: nocalbania.org.al

in Baku, Azerbaijan 12 – 28 June 2015
- Competitors: 28 in 9 sports
- Flag bearer: Ada Demneri
- Medals: Gold 0 Silver 0 Bronze 0 Total 0

European Games appearances (overview)
- 2015; 2019; 2023; 2027

Albania competed at the 2015 European Games, in Baku, Azerbaijan from 12 to 28 June 2015.

== Team ==
Competitors from Albania per sport
Sport	Men	Women	Total
Athletics	10	5	15
Boxing	2	0	2
Cycling road	2	0	2
Judo	1	0	1
Karate	1	0	1
Shooting	1	0	1
Swimming	1	1	2
Taekwondo	0	1	1
Wrestling	3	0	3
Total	21	7	28

== Boxing ==
Men

Athlete	Event	Round of 32	Round of 16	Quarterfinals	Semifinals	Final	
Athlete	Event	Opposition Result	Opposition Result	Opposition Result	Opposition Result	Opposition Result	Rank
Alban Beqiri	69 kg	Nolan (IRL); L 0–3	did not advance				

== Cycling ==
=== Road ===
Men

Athlete	Event	Time	Rank
Eugert Zhupa	Men's road time trial	1:06:26.84	29

== Judo ==
Men

Athlete	Event	Round of 64	Round of 32	Round of 16	Quarterfinals	Semifinals	Repechage	Final / BM	
Athlete	Event	Opposition Result	Opposition Result	Opposition Result	Opposition Result	Opposition Result	Opposition Result	Opposition Result	Rank
Igli Ramosacaj	−73 kg	Bye	Drebot (UKR); L 000–100	did not advance					

== Karate ==
Athlete	Event	Group phase				Semifinal	Final / BM	
Athlete	Event	Opposition Score	Opposition Score	Opposition Score	Rank	Opposition Score	Opposition Score	Rank
Halil Marqeshi	Men's -60 kg	Maresca (ITA); L 0–8	Gomez Garcia (ESP); L 10–0	Farzaliyev (AZE); L 0–6	did not advance			

== Shooting ==
Men

Athlete	Event	Qualification		Final	
Athlete	Event	Points	Rank	Points	Rank
Arben Kucana	Men's 10m air pistol	569	29	did not advance	
Arben Kucana	Men's 50m pistol	538	26	did not advance	

== Swimming ==
Men

Athlete	Events	Heat		Semifinal		Final	
Athlete	Events	Time	Rank	Time	Rank	Time	Rank
Franc Aleksi	200m freestyle	2:01.88	53	did not advance			
Franc Aleksi	400m freestyle	4:19.05	51	did not advance			

Women

Athlete	Events	Heat		Semifinal		Final	
Athlete	Events	Time	Rank	Time	Rank	Time	Rank
Diana Basho	200m freestyle	2:21.66	53	did not advance			
Diana Basho	400m freestyle	5:00.36	45	did not advance			

== Taekwondo ==
Athlete	Event	Round of 16	Quarterfinals	Semifinals	Repechage	Final / BM	
Athlete	Event	Opposition Result	Opposition Result	Opposition Result	Opposition Result	Opposition Result	Rank
Ada Demneri	Women's 57 kg	Calvo (ESP); L 1–13	did not advance				

== Wrestling ==
Men's freestyle

Athlete	Event	Qualification	1/8 final	Quarterfinal	Semifinal	Repechage 1	Repechage 2	Final/BM	Rank
Osman Hajdari	74 kg	BYE		Brzozowski (POL); L 0–4	did not advance				
