= Malta at the 2015 European Games =

- IOC code: MLT
- NOC: Malta Olympic Committee
- Website: nocmalta.org

European Games appearances (overview)
- 2015; 2019; 2023; 2027

Malta competed at the 2015 European Games, in Baku, Azerbaijan from 12 to 28 June 2015.
