= Luxembourg at the 2015 European Games =

- IOC code: LUX
- NOC: Luxembourg Olympic and Sporting Committee
- Website: teamletzebuerg.lu

in Baku, Azerbaijan 12 – 28 June 2015
- Competitors: 65 in 9 sports
- Flag bearer: Jeff Henckels
- Medals: Gold 0 Silver 0 Bronze 0 Total 0

European Games appearances (overview)
- 2015; 2019; 2023; 2027

Luxembourg competed at the 2015 European Games, in Baku, Azerbaijan from 12 to 28 June 2015.

== Archery ==
Athlete	Event	Ranking round		Round of 64	Round of 32	Round of 16	Quarterfinals	Semifinals	Final / BM	
Athlete	Event	Score	Seed	Opposition Score	Opposition Score	Opposition Score	Opposition Score	Opposition Score	Opposition Score	Rank
Jeff Henckels	Men's individual	662	20	Senyuk (AZE); W 6–4	Pasqualucci (ITA); W 7–3	Ivanytskyy (UKR); L 2–6	Did not advance			9

== Athletics ==
Luxembourg has qualified 50 athletes.

- Mixed team – 1 team of 50 athletes

== Cycling ==
Luxembourg has qualified 6 athletes.

- Men's road race – 3 quota places
- Men's time trial – 1 quota place
- Women's road race – 2 quota places
- Women's time trial – 1 quota place
- Men's cross-country – 1 quota place

== Fencing ==
Luxembourg has qualified 1 athlete.

- Women's individual épée – 1 quota place

== Gymnastics ==
Luxembourg has qualified 1 athlete.

=== Artistic ===
- Women's individual – 1 quota place

== Karate ==
Luxembourg has qualified 1 athlete.

- Women's −55kg – 1 quota place

== Shooting ==
Luxembourg has qualified 1 athlete.

- Men's trap – 1 quota place

== Table tennis ==
Luxembourg has qualified 3 athletes.

- Women's singles – 2 quota places
- Women's team – 1 team of 3 athletes

== Triathlon ==
Luxembourg has qualified 1 athlete.

- Men's – Bob Haller
