= Athletic Association of Small States of Europe =

European sporting body

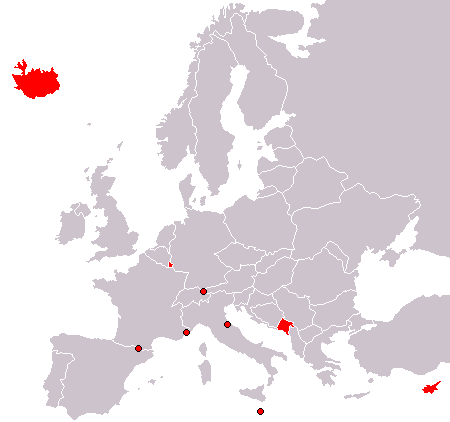
- Member nations
- Formation: 1994
- Official language: French and English
- President: Frank Carreras
- Website: aasse.org

AASSE Team flag (based on official documents of the European Team Championships 2009 - 3rd League - Sarajevo)

The Athletic Association of Small States of Europe (AASSE) is a transnational organization representing the athletic interests of smaller European nations. It was created following a proposal by the Cyprus, Iceland, Liechtenstein and Luxembourg delegations at the Congress of the International Association of Athletics Federations (IAAF) in Barcelona in 1989.

The official formation of AASSE took place during the 1994 European Athletic Association Congress in Venice in presence of the EAA president Carl-Olaf Homen. The Constitution Rules were signed by the representatives of Andorra, Cyprus, Iceland, Liechtenstein, Luxembourg, Malta and San Marino.

The association only accepts membership applications from European states with a population under one million. All eligible states are currently members with the exception of Vatican City, which did not participate in international athletic competitions, but participated for the first time in 2024 at the Championships of the Small States of Europe.

== Current members ==
| | Country | Member since |
|---|---|---|
| 1 | Andorra | Founding Member |
| 2 | Cyprus | Founding Member |
| 3 | Gibraltar | 2015 |
| 4 | Iceland | Founding Member |
| 5 | Liechtenstein | Founding Member |
| 6 | Luxembourg | Founding Member |
| 7 | Malta | Founding Member |
| 8 | Monaco | 2000 |
| 9 | Montenegro | 2006 |
| 10 | San Marino | Founding Member |

== Competitions ==
The AASSE states participated as a combined team in the European Cup, which was succeeded by the European Team Championships from 2009. Andorra, Cyprus, Iceland, Luxembourg, Malta, Montenegro and San Marino now compete separately, with Gibraltar, Monaco and Liechtenstein competing together as the AASSE since 2021.

Since 1985, the AASSE members host and participate in the Games of the Small States of Europe (GSSE), a biennial multi-sport competition with twelve men's and women's disciplines. The biennial Championships of the Small States of Europe was first held in 2016, allowing members to compete against each other in even years, following the change in schedule of the European Team Championships.
