= Moldova at the 2015 European Games =

- IOC code: MDA
- NOC: National Olympic Committee of the Republic of Moldova

in Baku, Azerbaijan 12 – 28 June 2015
- Competitors: 87
- Flag bearer: Mihail Sava
- Medals Ranked 33rd: Gold 0 Silver 1 Bronze 2 Total 3

European Games appearances (overview)
- 2015; 2019; 2023; 2027

Moldova competed at the 2015 European Games, in Baku, Azerbaijan from 12 to 28 June 2015.

== Medalists ==
Medal	Name	Sport	Event	Date
Silver	Piotr Ianulov	Wrestling	Men's freestyle 86 kg	18 June
Bronze	Svetlana Saenko	Wrestling	Women's freestyle 75 kg	16 June
Bronze	Alexandru Chirtoacă	Wrestling	Men's freestyle 57 kg	17 June

== Archery ==
Athlete	Event	Ranking round		Round of 64	Round of 32	Round of 16	Quarterfinals	Semifinals	Final / BM	
Athlete	Event	Score	Seed	Opposition Score	Opposition Score	Opposition Score	Opposition Score	Opposition Score	Opposition Score	Rank
Dan Olaru	Men's individual	652	32	Wojtkowiak (Poland); L 5–6	Did not advance					33
Alexandra Mirca	Women's individual	618	44	Pavlova (Ukraine); L 0–6	Did not advance					33
Alexandra Mirca; Dan Olaru	Mixed team	1270	18	—		Did not advance				21
