= Portugal at the 2015 European Games =

- IOC code: POR
- NOC: Olympic Committee of Portugal
- Website: www.comiteolimpicoportugal.pt

in Baku, Azerbaijan 12 – 28 June 2015
- Competitors: 100 in 14 sports
- Flag bearers: João Costa (opening); Telma Monteiro (closing)
- Officials: 45
- Medals Ranked 19th: Gold 3 Silver 4 Bronze 3 Total 10

European Games appearances (overview)
- 2015; 2019; 2023; 2027

Portugal participated at the 2015 European Games in Baku, Azerbaijan, from 12 to 28 June 2015, with a delegation of 100 athletes that competed in 14 sports.

On 10 April 2015, the Olympic Committee of Portugal (COP) announced that the country had secured 99 athlete quota places in 13 sports, with the possibility of increasing this number by the deadline for inscription of athletes (30 April 2015). On 12 May 2015, COP announced a list of 101 athletes competing in 14 sports, following a reallocation of badminton quota places. On 4 June 2015, a final list of 100 athletes was announced, with the exclusion of female wrestler Ana Pereira due to failure in complying with the national federation selection criteria. In addition, two injury-related changes were made: female gymnast Zoi Lima and male table tennis player João Monteiro were substituted by Mariana Pitrez and João Geraldo. On the opening day of the Games, clinical issues forced four last-minute athlete changes: female swimmer Tamila Holub (appendicitis) was replaced by Madalena Azevedo, while the acrobatic gymnastics female trio was replaced due to injury of one of its members (Raquel Martins) by Jéssica Correia, Joana Patrocínio and Susana Pinto.

The delegation will include a staff of 59 people, among which 45 officials, and will be headed by former Olympic canoer José Garcia, who will also lead the Olympic mission to the 2016 Summer Olympics. Four-time Olympic shooter João Costa was chosen to be the flagbearer at the opening ceremony, while multiple world and European medal-winning judoka Telma Monteiro will carry the flag at the closing ceremony.

== Medal summary ==
Medal	Name	Sport	Event	Date
Gold	Tiago Apolónia; Marcos Freitas; João Geraldo	Table tennis	Men's team	15 June
Gold	Rui Bragança	Taekwondo	Men's −58 kg	16 June
Gold	Telma Monteiro	Judo	Women's −57 kg	25 June
Silver	João Silva	Triathlon	Men's triathlon	14 June
Silver	Fernando Pimenta	Canoe sprint	Men's K-1 1000 m	15 June
Silver	Fernando Pimenta	Canoe sprint	Men's K1 5000 m	16 June
Silver	João Costa	Shooting	Men's 10 m air pistol	17 June
Bronze	Júlio Ferreira	Taekwondo	Men's −80 kg	18 June
Bronze	Ana Rente; Beatriz Martins	Gymnastics	Women's trampoline synchronized	21 June
Bronze	Portugal national beach soccer team: Alan; Elinton Andrade; Tiago Batalha; Nuno Belchior; Rui Coimbra; José Maria Fonseca; Madjer; Bruno Novo; Tiago Petrony; Bernardo Santos; Jordan Santos; Bruno Torres	Beach soccer	Men's tournament	28 June

== Badminton ==
Portugal qualified three athletes in three events, based on the ranking list released by the Badminton World Federation on 26 March 2015. The competition took place at the Baku Sports Hall from 22 to 28 June. None of the participating athletes were able to advance from the group play stage, with Sónia Gonçalves securing the only Portuguese win in this competition.

Badminton event results
Athlete	Event	Group play stage			Round of 16	Quarterfinals	Semifinals	Gold/Bronze medal match	Rank
Athlete	Event	Opposition Result	Opposition Result	Opposition Result	Opposition Result	Opposition Result	Opposition Result	Opposition Result	Rank
Ricardo Silva	Men's singles	Corvée (FRA); L 6–21, 11–21	Holst (DEN); L 9–21, 9–21	Durkinjak (CRO); L 13–21, 10–21	Did not advance				25–32
Ângelo Silva; Ricardo Silva	Men's doubles	Florian and Kopriva (CZE); L 15–21, 18–21	Magee and Magee (IRL); L 15–21, 6–21	Boe and Mogensen (DEN); L 10–21, 7–21	—N/a	Did not advance			13–16
Sónia Gonçalves	Women's singles	Azurmendi (ESP); L 16–21, 10–21	Simić (SRB); W 21–16, 21–15	Kjaersfeldt (DEN); L 7–21, 13–21	Did not advance				13–18

== Beach soccer ==
Portugal qualified a team of 12 players based on the results at the 2014 Euro Beach Soccer League. The competition took place at the Beach Arena from 24 to 28 June.

The Portuguese team finished at the top of Group A, ahead of Switzerland, after winning all of its matches. As a result, they advanced to the semi-finals, where they suffered a 2–1 defeat against Group B runners-up and world champions Russia. Having beaten Switzerland 6–5 in the group stage, Portugal repeated the scoreline in the bronze medal match to secure the tenth and last Portuguese medal at these Games.

=== Squad ===
Coach: (Portugal) Mário Narciso

No.	Pos.	Player	Date of birth (age)	Caps	Club
1	GK	Tiago Petrony	18 November 1988 (aged 26)	16	(Portugal) Sporting CP
2	DF	Rui Coimbra	14 April 1986 (aged 29)	120	(Portugal) Sporting CP
3	DF	Tiago Batalha	1 September 1989 (aged 25)	2	(Portugal) Braga
4	DF	Bruno Torres	21 April 1980 (aged 35)	144	(Portugal) Braga
5	MF	Jordan Santos	2 July 1991 (aged 23)	67	(Portugal) Sporting CP
6	FW	Alan	21 June 1975 (aged 40)	392	(Brazil) BS Botafogo
7	DF	Madjer	22 January 1977 (aged 38)	461	(Portugal) Sporting CP
8	FW	José Maria Fonseca	23 July 1982 (aged 32)	29	(Portugal) Braga
9	FW	Bruno Novo	4 May 1982 (aged 33)	105	(Portugal) Braga
10	FW	Nuno Belchior	9 October 1982 (aged 32)	167	(Portugal) Sporting CP
11	DF	Bernardo Santos	29 December 1989 (aged 25)	7	(Brazil) BS Botafogo
12	GK	Elinton Andrade	30 March 1979 (aged 36)	2	(Brazil) BS Flamengo

Source: Baku 2015 European Games

=== Group stage ===
Group A

Pos	Team	Pld	W	WE	WP	L	GF	GA	GD	Pts	Group stage result
1	Portugal	3	2	1	0	0	17	13	+4	8	Advanced to semifinals
2	Switzerland	3	2	0	0	1	17	14	+3	6	Advanced to semifinals
3	Ukraine	3	1	0	0	2	11	11	0	3	Advanced to classification matches
4	Azerbaijan	3	0	0	0	3	9	16	−7	0	Advanced to classification matches

Source: Baku 2015 European Games
24 June 2015
17:30 AZST (UTC+5)

Portugal	6–5	Switzerland
Madjer 4:31' (P1); Belchior 10:29' (P2), 10:19' (P3), 4:17' (P3); Fonseca 2:16' (P2), 5:36' (P3)	Report	Stanković 10:11' (P1), 5:02' (P1); M. Jaeggy 9:28' (P2); Ott 7:28' (P2), 4:31' (P3)

Beach Arena, Baku
Referee: Gionni Matticoli (Italy), Sofien Benchabane (France), Yeliz Topaloglu (Turkey)

25 June 2015
17:30 AZST (UTC+5)

Portugal	5–4 (a.e.t.)	Ukraine
Belchior 10:09' (P1), 4:59' (P3); Coimbra 0:24' (P2); J. Santos 3:36' (P3); B. Santos 1:52' (ET)	Report	Borsuk 10:01' (P2); Pachev 9:51' (P2), 2:05' (P2); Korniichuk 4:36' (P2)

Beach Arena, Baku
Referee: Amin Utulu (Malta), Richard de Bruijn (Netherlands), Gionni Matticoli (Italy)

26 June 2015
20:30 AZST (UTC+5)

Azerbaijan	4–6	Portugal
Zeynalov 9:54' (P1), 4:11' (P1); Allahguliyev 8:56' (P1); Aliyev 3:55' (P3)	Report	Torres 10:50' (P2); Madjer 1:51' (P2), 8:14' (P3), 0:50' (P3); Fonseca 7:26' (P3), 1:20' (P3)

Beach Arena, Baku
Referee: Gionni Matticoli (Italy), Richard de Bruijn (Netherlands), Sofien Benchabane (France)

=== Semi-finals ===
27 June 2015
20:30 AZST (UTC+5)

Portugal	1–2	Russia
Fonseca 6:01' (P2)	Report	Paporotnyi 10:30' (P2), 1:56' (P3)

Beach Arena, Baku
Referee: Amin Utulu (Malta), Lukasz Ostrowski (Poland), Oleg Cebotari (Moldova)

=== Bronze medal match ===
28 June 2015
14:30 AZST (UTC+5)

Switzerland	5–6	Portugal (bronze)
Borer 10:25' (P2), 8:28' (P3); Spaccarotella 2:07' (P2); M. Jaeggy 8:47' (P3); Ott 7:13' (P3)	Report	Belchior 4:16' (P1), 4:59' (P3), 4:31' (P3); Torres 10:28' (P2); J. Santos 3:00' (P2); Alan 2:10' (P2)

Beach Arena, Baku
Referee: Gionni Matticoli (Italy), Laurynas Arzuolaitis (Lithuania), Ago Kartmann (Estonia)

== Canoe sprint ==
Portugal qualified thirteen athletes in eleven events, based on the results at the 2014 Canoe Sprint European Championships. The competition took place at the Kur Sport and Rowing Centre in Mingachevir from 14 to 16 June.

Portuguese boats qualified for eight finals (seven finals A and one final B). The best results came through Olympic silver medalist Fernando Pimenta, who won two silver medals, after finishing behind Germany's Max Hoff in the men's K1 1000 and 5000 metres events. Pimenta was the only Portuguese athlete to win more than one medal at these Games.

Men

Men's canoe sprint event results
Athlete	Event	Heats		Semifinals		Final	
Athlete	Event	Time	Rank	Time	Rank	Time	Rank
Hélder Silva	C1 200 m	39.248	1 Q	Bye		40.682	5
Diogo Lopes	K1 200 m	36.441	5 q	36.443	9	Did not advance	
Fernando Pimenta	K1 1000 m	3:40.476	1 Q	3:25.832	1 Q	3:28.421	2nd place, silver medalist(s)
Fernando Pimenta	K1 5000 m	—N/a				20:11.989	2nd place, silver medalist(s)
Emanuel Silva; João Ribeiro	K2 1000 m	3:14.726	4 q	3:08.734	3 Q	3:18.659	9
David Fernandes; Emanuel Silva; Fernando Pimenta; João Ribeiro	K4 1000 m	2:53.152	2 Q	Bye		3:09:010	5

Women

Women's canoe sprint event results
Athlete	Event	Heats		Semifinals		Final	
Athlete	Event	Time	Rank	Time	Rank	Time	Rank
Teresa Portela	K1 200 m	41.330	2 q	40.675	5 q	42.627	9
Teresa Portela	K1 500 m	1:53.169	3 q	1:48.896	3 Q	2:15.435	9
Beatriz Gomes; Joana Vasconcelos	K2 200 m	37.797	4 q	37.264	2 Q	38.609	6
Márcia Aldeias; Maria Cabrita	K2 500 m	1:47.576	7 q	1:45.437	7	Did not advance	
Beatriz Gomes; Francisca Laia; Helena Rodrigues; Joana Vasconcelos	K4 500 m	1:37.910	5 q	1:32.169	5	Did not advance	

== Cycling ==
Portugal qualified nine athletes in six events, based on the national ranking list released by the Union Cycliste Internationale on 31 December 2014. The competition took place from 16 to 27 June in several courses and venues across Baku. Mountain biker David Rosa was the only Portuguese athlete to reach a top-ten placing, by finishing exactly in the 10th place in the men's cross-country event.

=== Road cycling ===
The road race course consisted of multiple laps in an urban circuit starting and finishing at the Freedom Square. The men's race (21 June) had a total distance of 215.8 kilometres (134.1 mi), consisting of six laps of 12.8 km (8.0 mi) followed by ten laps of 13.9 km (8.6 mi). The women's race (20 June) had a total distance of 120.7 kilometres (75.0 mi), consisting of four laps of 12.8 km (8.0 mi) followed by five laps of 13.9 km (8.6 mi). The men's time trial (18 June) course was located at Bilgah Beach and consisted of two laps of 25.8 km (16.0 mi), for a total distance of 51.6 km (32.1 mi).

Road cycling event results
Athlete	Event	Time	Rank
Filipe Cardoso	Men's road race	5:28:26	19
José Gonçalves	Men's road race	Did not finish	
Edgar Pinto	Men's road race	5:33:43	33
Rafael Reis	Men's road race	Did not finish	
Fábio Silvestre	Men's road race	Did not finish	
Rafael Reis	Men's time trial	1:04:06.74	19
Daniela Reis	Women's road race	3:25:53	14

=== Mountain biking ===
The mountain biking events took place on 13 June at the Mountain Bike Velopark. The men's cross-country event course had a total distance of 36.7 km (22.8 mi), consisting of one start loop of 1.5 km (0.93 mi) followed by eight laps of 4.4 km (2.7 mi), whereas the women's course was followed by six laps of 4.4 km (2.7 mi) for a total distance of 27.9 km (17.3 mi).

Mountain biking event results
Athlete	Event	Time	Rank
David Rosa	Men's cross country	1:45:12	10
Joana Monteiro	Women's cross country	Lapped	23

=== BMX ===
The BMX events took place at the BMX Velopark on 26 and 28 June.

BMX event results
Athlete	Event	Qualifying Time Trial		Time Trial Super Final		Motos		Semifinals		Final	
Athlete	Event	Time	Rank	Time	Rank	Points	Rank	Time	Rank	Time	Rank
André Martins	Men's BMX	37.712	27	Did not advance		21	7 (28)	Did not advance			

== Gymnastics ==
=== Acrobatic ===
Portugal qualified five athletes in three events, based on the results at the 2014 Acrobatic Gymnastics World Championships.

Gymnastics acrobactic event results
Athlete	Event	Exercise			Total score	Rank
Athlete	Event	Balance	Dynamic	Combined	Total score	Rank
Jéssica Correia; Joana Patrocínio; Susana Pinto	Women's groups all-around	27.050	27.030	26.250	80.330	7
Inês Germano; João Martins	Mixed pairs all-around	26.830	26.410	26.090	79.330	5
Inês Germano; João Martins	Mixed pairs balance	26.920	—N/a	—N/a	26.920	5

=== Aerobic ===
Portugal qualified a pair of athletes in one event, based on the results at the 2013 Aerobic Gymnastics European Championships.

Gymnastics aerobic event results
Athlete	Event	Qualification		Final	
Athlete	Event	Score	Rank	Score	Rank
Tiago Faquinha; Ana Maçanita	Mixed pairs	18.550	7 R1	Did not advance	

=== Artistic ===
Portugal qualified four athletes in eleven events, based on the results at the 2014 European Men's Artistic Gymnastics Championships and 2014 European Women's Artistic Gymnastics Championships.

Men

Men's artistic gymnastics event results
Athlete	Event	Qualification								Final							
Athlete	Event	Apparatus						Total	Rank	Apparatus						Total	Rank
Athlete	Event	F	PH	R	V	PB	HB	Total	Rank	F	PH	R	V	PB	HB	Total	Rank
Bernardo Almeida	Individual all-around	13.100	11.233	12.066	13.333	13.166	12.333	75.231	57	Did not advance							
Bernardo Almeida	Floor	13.100	—N/a					13.100	61	Did not advance							
Bernardo Almeida	Pommel horse	—N/a	11.233	—N/a				11.233	70	Did not advance							
Bernardo Almeida	Rings	—N/a		12.066	—N/a			12.066	67	Did not advance							
Bernardo Almeida	Parallel bars	—N/a				13.166	—N/a	13.166	56	Did not advance							
Bernardo Almeida	Horizontal bar	—N/a					12.333	12.333	70	Did not advance							
Simão Almeida	Individual all-around	13.766	9.600	14.066	14.233	14.300	12.800	78.765	45	Did not advance							
Simão Almeida	Floor	13.766	—N/a					13.766	41	Did not advance							
Simão Almeida	Pommel horse	—N/a	9.600	—N/a				9.600	75	Did not advance							
Simão Almeida	Rings	—N/a		14.066	—N/a			14.066	14	Did not advance							
Simão Almeida	Parallel bars	—N/a				14.300	—N/a	14.300	25	Did not advance							
Simão Almeida	Horizontal bar	—N/a					12.800	12.800	64	Did not advance							
Vasco Barata	Individual all-around	11.800	11.500	12.800	12.900	13.266	13.433	75.699	56	Did not advance							
Vasco Barata	Floor	11.800	—N/a					11.800	75	Did not advance							
Vasco Barata	Pommel horse	—N/a	11.500	—N/a				11.500	66	Did not advance							
Vasco Barata	Rings	—N/a		12.800	—N/a			12.800	54	Did not advance							
Vasco Barata	Parallel bars	—N/a				13.266	—N/a	13.266	=53	Did not advance							
Vasco Barata	Horizontal bar	—N/a					13.433	13.433	47	Did not advance							
Bernardo Almeida; Simão Almeida; Vasco Barata	Team all-around	—N/a								26.866	22.733	26.866	27.566	27.566	26.233	157.830	21

Women

Women's artistic gymnastics event results
Athlete	Event	Qualification						Final					
Athlete	Event	Apparatus				Total	Rank	Apparatus				Total	Rank
Athlete	Event	F	V	UB	BB	Total	Rank	F	V	UB	BB	Total	Rank
Mariana Pitrez	Individual all-around	11.433	12.933	11.000	10.066	45.432	67	Did not advance					
Mariana Pitrez	Floor	11.433	—N/a			11.433	64	Did not advance					
Mariana Pitrez	Uneven bars	—N/a		11.000	—N/a	11.000	51	Did not advance					
Mariana Pitrez	Balance beam	—N/a			10.066	10.066	75	Did not advance					

=== Trampoline ===
Portugal qualified four athletes in four events, based on the results at the 2014 European Trampoline Championships.

Gymnastics trampoline event results
Athlete	Event	Qualification		Final	
Athlete	Event	Score	Rank	Score	Rank
Diogo Ganchinho	Men's individual	104.445	7 Q	13.245	6
Ricardo Santos	Men's individual	103.365	10	Did not advance	
Diogo Ganchinho; Ricardo Santos	Men's synchronized	47.800	11	Did not advance	
Ana Rente	Women's individual	95.885	11	Did not advance	
Beatriz Martins	Women's individual	93.575	15	Did not advance	
Ana Rente; Beatriz Martins	Women's synchronized	83.000	6 Q	44.500	3rd place, bronze medalist(s)

== Judo ==
Portugal qualified 14 athletes in 12 events, based on the International Judo Federation world ranking list announced on 2 March 2015.

Men

Men's judo event results
Athlete	Event	Round of 64	Round of 32	Round of 16	Quarterfinals	Semifinals	Repechage	Gold/Bronze match	Rank
Athlete	Event	Opposition Result	Opposition Result	Opposition Result	Opposition Result	Opposition Result	Opposition Result	Opposition Result	Rank
Nuno Carvalho	–60 kg	—N/a	Petrikov (CZE); L 0s3–0	Did not advance					17–32
Diogo César	–66 kg	—N/a	Bruno (ITA); W 100s1–0	Pulyaev (RUS); L 0s3–100s1	Did not advance				9–16
Sergiu Oleinic	–66 kg	—N/a	Krassas (CYP); W 100–0s2	Oates (GBR); W 1s2–0s1	Shikhalizada (AZE); W 100s1–0	Khan-Magomedov (RUS); L 0s2–100s1	—N/a	Seidl (GER); L 0–12s2	5
André Alves	–73 kg	Bye	Fedosejenkovs (LAT); W 100s2–0s3	Draksić (SLO); L 0s3–1s1	Did not advance				9–16
Jorge Fernandes	–73 kg	Bye	Laamanen (FIN); W 1s1–0	Muki (ISR); L 0s1–100	Did not advance				9–16
Carlos Luz	–81 kg	Bye	Livesey (GBR); W 11s3–0s1	Nifontov (RUS); L 0s2–0s1	Did not advance				9–16
Diogo Lima	–81 kg	Bye	Stsiashenka (BLR); L 1s2–1s2	Did not advance					17–32
Célio Dias	–90 kg	Bye	Gurbanov (AZE); L 0–101	Did not advance					17–32
Jorge Fonseca	–100 kg	—N/a	Minaskin (EST); W 2s2–0s2	Gasimov (AZE); W 101s3–0s2	Joergensen (DEN); W 100–0s2	Grol (NED); L 10s2–0s3	—N/a	Nikiforov (BEL); L 0s1–100	5
André Alves; Célio Dias; Jorge Fonseca; Carlos Luz; Sergiu Oleinic	Team	—N/a		Bye	France (FRA)				

Women

Women's judo event results
Athlete	Event	Round of 32	Round of 16	Quarterfinals	Semifinals	Repechage	Gold/Bronze match	Rank
Athlete	Event	Opposition Result	Opposition Result	Opposition Result	Opposition Result	Opposition Result	Opposition Result	Rank
Leandra Freitas	–48 kg	Dumitru (ROU); W 1s3–0	Dolgova (RUS); L 0s2–101s1	Did not advance				9–16
Joana Ramos	–52 kg	Krasniqi (KOS); L 0s1–0	Did not advance					17–32
Telma Monteiro	–57 kg	Bye	Rogić (SRB); W 0s2–0s3 GS	Verhagen (NED); W 0s1–0s2	Pavia (FRA); W 11s3–0s2	—N/a	Karakas (HUN); W 110–0	1st place, gold medalist(s)
Ana Cachola	–63 kg	Labazina (RUS); W 100–0	Schlesinger (GBR); W 1s2–0s1	Agbegnenou (FRA); L 0–101	—N/a	Unterwurzacher (AUT); W 3s1–0	Gerbi (ISR); L 0–1s1	5
Yahima Ramirez	–78 kg	Pogorzelec (POL); L 0s3–0s2	Did not advance					17–32

== Karate ==
Portugal qualified one athlete, based on the results at the 2015 European Karate Championships.

Karate event results
Athlete	Event	Elimination round					Semifinals	Gold/Bronze match	Rank
Athlete	Event	Opposition Result	Opposition Result	Opposition Result	Points	Place	Opposition Result	Opposition Result	Rank
Filipe Reis	Men's kumite +84 kg	Bitević (SRB); L 1–2	Horne (GER); L 0–6	Sheppard (NED); L 0–4	0	4	Did not advance		8

== Shooting ==
Portugal qualified four athletes in six events, based on the rankings announced by the European Shooting Confederation.

Shooting event results
Athlete	Event	Qualification		Semifinals		Final	
Athlete	Event	Points	Rank	Points	Rank	Points	Rank
João Azevedo	Men's trap	119	14	Did not advance			
João Costa	Men's 10 m air pistol	583	3 Q	—N/a		201.5	2nd place, silver medalist(s)
João Costa	Men's 50 m pistol	550	14	—N/a		Did not advance	
José Faria	Men's trap	116	24	Did not advance			
Joana Castelão	Women's 10 m air pistol	375	25	—N/a		Did not advance	
Joana Castelão	Women's 25 m pistol	561	27	Did not advance			
João Costa; Joana Castelão	Mixed 10 m air pistol	473	9	Did not advance			

== Swimming ==
Portugal has qualified for nine individual quota places, based on a ranking list announced by the Ligue Européenne de Natation, accounting the results per NOC from the past three European Junior Swimming Championships.

== Table tennis ==
Portugal qualified two teams of three players (one team per gender) based on the results at the 2014 European Table Tennis Championships. Two players from each team also competed in the respective singles event.

Table tennis event results
Athlete	Event	Round 1	Round 2	Round 3	Quarterfinals	Semifinals	Gold or Bronze medal match	Rank
Athlete	Event	Opposition Result	Opposition Result	Opposition Result	Opposition Result	Opposition Result	Opposition Result	Rank
Tiago Apolónia	Men's singles	Bye	Duran (ESP); W 4–2	Karlsson (SWE); W 4–2	Samsonov (BLR); L 0–4	Did not advance		5–8
Marcos Freitas	Men's singles	Bye	Pistej (SVK); W 4–0	Gerell (SWE); W 4–2	Drinkhall (GBR); L 1–4	Did not advance		5–8
Tiago Apolónia; Marcos Freitas; João Geraldo	Men's team	Romania (ROU); W 3–1	—N/a		Poland (POL); W 3–0	Austria (AUT); W 3–2	France (FRA); W 3–0	1st place, gold medalist(s)
Yu Fu	Women's singles	Bye	Odorova (SVK); L 1–4	Did not advance				17–32
Leila Oliveira	Women's singles	Madarasz (HUN); L 3–4	Did not advance					33–47
Yu Fu; Ana Neves; Leila Oliveira	Women's team	Russia (RUS); L 1–3	—N/a		Did not advance			9

== Taekwondo ==
Portugal qualified four athletes, based on the Olympic Ranking list announced by the World Taekwondo Federation on 31 March 2015.

Taekwondo event results
Athlete	Event	Preliminary round	Quarterfinals	Repechage	Semifinals	Gold or Bronze medal match	Rank
Athlete	Event	Opposition Result	Opposition Result	Opposition Result	Opposition Result	Opposition Result	Rank
Rui Bragança	Men's −58 kg	Sezer (TUR); W 12–0 PTG	Gladović (SRB); W 13–7 PTF	—	Ketbi (BEL); W 11–4 PTF	Tortosa Cabrera (ESP); W 6–5 PTF	1st place, gold medalist(s)
Mário Silva	Men's −68 kg	Pilavakis (CYP); W 12–6 PTF	Robak (POL); L 2–10 PTF	Tazegül (TUR); L 6–12 PTF	—	Did not advance	7
Júlio Ferreira	Men's −80 kg	Martínez Garcia (ESP); W 10–4 PTF	Cook (MDA); W 8–7 GDP	—	Beigi Harchegani (AZE); L 2–6 PTF	Ordemann (NOR); W 6–5 GDP	3rd place, bronze medalist(s)
Joana Cunha	Women's −57 kg	Glasnović (SWE); L 0–1 PTF	Did not advance				11

== Triathlon ==
Portugal qualified five athletes in two events, based on the European Triathlon Union 2014 Points List rankings on 31 December 2014.

Triathlon results
Athlete	Event	Swim (1.5 km)	Trans 1	Bike (40 km)	Trans 2	Run (10 km)	Total Time	Rank
Pedro Palma	Men's	20:21	0:43	1:00:19	0:25	32:25	1:54:13	34
João Pereira	Men's	19:28	0:42	57:42	0:24	31:30	1:49:46	8
João Silva	Men's	19:30	0:43	57:40	0:24	30:25	1:48:42	2nd place, silver medalist(s)
Ana Ramos	Women's	23:10	0:58	—	—	—	—	Lap
Melanie Santos	Women's	20:45	0:49	1:06:23	0:28	39:46	2:08:11	25

== Wrestling ==
Portugal qualified five athletes, based on the results at the 2014 European Wrestling Championships.

=== Freestyle ===
Freestyle wrestling event results
Athlete	Event	Qualification	1/8 Finals	Quarterfinals	Repechage 1	Repechage 2	Semifinals	Gold/Bronze match	Rank
Athlete	Event	Opposition Result	Opposition Result	Opposition Result	Opposition Result	Opposition Result	Opposition Result	Opposition Result	Rank
Liliana Santos	Women's freestyle 48 kg	Bye	Stadnyk (AZE); L 1–4 SP	—	Bye	Sabatie (FRA); L 0–3 PO	Did not advance		13
Vânia Guerreiro	Women's freestyle 53 kg	Bye	Horishna (UKR); L 0–5 VT	Did not advance					16

=== Greco-Roman ===
Greco-Roman wrestling event results
Athlete	Event	Qualification	1/8 Finals	Quarterfinals	Repechage 1	Repechage 2	Semifinals	Gold/Bronze match	Rank
Athlete	Event	Opposition Result	Opposition Result	Opposition Result	Opposition Result	Opposition Result	Opposition Result	Opposition Result	Rank
João Carvalho	Men's Greco-Roman 59 kg	Bye	Amoyan (ARM); L 0–3 PO	Did not advance					18
Hugo Passos	Men's Greco-Roman 66 kg	Ugurli (TUR); L 1–3 PP	Did not advance						22
Zurab Bekauri	Men's Greco-Roman 71 kg	Bye	Etlinger (CRO); L 0–5 VB	Did not advance					15
