= Greece at the 2015 European Games =

- IOC code: GRE
- NOC: Hellenic Olympic Committee
- Website: www.hoc.gr

in Baku, Azerbaijan 12 – 28 June 2015
- Competitors: 132 in 25 sports
- Flag bearer: Eleftherios Petrounias
- Medals Ranked 28th: Gold 1 Silver 4 Bronze 4 Total 9

European Games appearances (overview)
- 2015; 2019; 2023; 2027

Greece competed at the 2015 European Games, in Baku, Azerbaijan from 12 to 28 June 2015.

== Medalists ==
Medal	Name	Sport	Event	Date
Gold	Eleftherios Petrounias	Gymnastics	Men's Rings	20 June
Silver	Michail Georgos Tzanos	Karate	Men's Kumite −84 kg	14 June
Silver	Vlasios Maras	Gymnastics	Men's Horizontal Bar	20 June
Silver	Anna Korakaki; Konstantinos Malgarinos	Shooting	Mixed 10m Air Pistol	22 June
Silver	Dimitrios Dimitriou	Swimming	Men's 400m Freestyle	23 June
Bronze	Women's U-18 national water polo team: Eleni Sotireli; Evangelia Loudi; Maria Patra; Eleni Elliniadi; Elisavet Protopapas; Milva Kalogerakou; Silia Logotheti; Vasiliki Plevritou; Artemis Safeti; Ioanna Stamatopoulou; Adamantia Doureka; Nikoleta Eleftheriadou; Ifigenia Mavrota	Water polo	Women's Tournament	20 June
Bronze	Men's U-18 national water polo team: Foivos Kalis; Kimon Alexiou; Nikolaos Gardikas; Dimitrios Nikolaidis; Alexandros Papanastasiou; Nikolaos Papasifakis; Dimitrios Skoumpakis; Konstantinos Chondrokoukis; Grigorios Giannopoulos; Polymeris Siordilis; Nikolaos Delagrammatikas; Nikolaos Kalargyros; Adamantios Mantis (†)	Water polo	Men's Tournament	21 June
Bronze	Ilias Iliadis	Judo	Men's −90kg	27 June
Bronze	Ilketra Varvara Lebl	Swimming	Women's 100m Βutterfly	26 June

== Archery ==
Men

Athlete	Event	Ranking round		Round of 64	Round of 32	Round of 16	Quarterfinals	Semifinals	Final / BM	
Athlete	Event	Score	Seed	Opposition Score	Opposition Score	Opposition Score	Opposition Score	Opposition Score	Opposition Score	Rank
Alexandros Karageorgiou	Men's Individual	630	53	Alvarino Garcia (Spain); L 4–6	Did not advance					33

Women

Athlete	Event	Ranking round		Round of 64	Round of 32	Round of 16	Quarterfinals	Semifinals	Final / BM	
Athlete	Event	Score	Seed	Opposition Score	Opposition Score	Opposition Score	Opposition Score	Opposition Score	Opposition Score	Rank
Evangelia Psarra	Women's Individual	630	28	Bech (Denmark); W 6–2	Timofeeva (Russia); W 6–4	Pavlova (Ukraine); W 6–5	Anagoz (Turkey); W 6–0	Winter (Germany); L 2–6	Marin (Spain); L 4–6	4
Ariadni Chorti	Women's Individual	615	49	Tonetta (Italy); L 2–6	Did not advance					33
Anatoli Martha Gkorila	Women's Individual	601	55	Sichenikova (Ukraine); L 2–6	Did not advance					33
Evangelia Psarra; Ariadni Chorti; Anatoli Martha Gkorila	Women's Team	1846	14	—N/a		Italy (Italy); L 2–6	Did not advance			9

Mixed

Athlete	Event	Ranking round		Round of 64	Round of 32	Round of 16	Quarterfinals	Semifinals	Final / BM	
Athlete	Event	Score	Seed	Opposition Score	Opposition Score	Opposition Score	Opposition Score	Opposition Score	Opposition Score	Rank
Evangelia Psarra; Alexandros Karageorgiou	Mixed Team	1260	24	—N/a		Did not advance				24

== Badminton ==
Singles

Athlete	Event	Group stage				Round of 16	Quarterfinal	Semifinal	Final / BM
Athlete	Event	Opposition Score	Opposition Score	Opposition Score	Rank	Opposition Score	Opposition Score	Opposition Score	Rank
Georgios Charalambidis	Men's Singles	Evans (Republic of Ireland); L 2–0 (21–7, 21–9)	Krausz (Hungary); L 2–0 (21–11, 21–16)	Tan (Belgium); L 2–0 (21–10, 21–12)	4	Did not advance			
Ioanna Karkantzia	Women's Singles	Sutara (Croatia); L 2–0 (21–17, 21–18)	Polikarpova (Russia); L 2–0 (4–21, 4–21)	Yigit (Turkey); L 2–0 (21–6, 21–9)	4	Did not advance			

Doubles

Athlete	Event	Group stage				Quarterfinal	Semifinal	Final / BM	
Athlete	Event	Opposition Score	Opposition Score	Opposition Score	Rank	Opposition Score	Opposition Score	Opposition Score	Rank
Petros Tentas; Eirini Tenta	Mixed Doubles	Krausz/Sarosi (HUN); L 2–0 (4–21, 5–21)	Beck/Kattenbeck (GER); L 2–0 (11–21, 6–21)	Mittelheisser/Fontaine (FRA); L 2–0 (4–21, 5–21)	4	Did not advance			

== Basketball 3X3 ==
Men

Athlete	Event	Group matches				Round of 16	Quarterfinals	Semifinals	Final / BM	
Athlete	Event	Opposition Score	Opposition Score	Opposition Score	Rank	Opposition Score	Opposition Score	Opposition Score	Opposition Score	Rank
Georgios Bogris; Leonidas Kaselakis; Epameinondas Papantoniou; Grigorios Rallatos	Men's Tournament	Italy (Italy); W 11–9	Estonia (Estonia); W 19–16	Serbia (Serbia); L 17–22	2	Belgium (Belgium); W 21–12	Slovenia (Slovenia); L 17–18	Did not advance		

Women

Athlete	Event	Group matches				Round of 16	Quarterfinals	Semifinals	Final / BM	
Athlete	Event	Opposition Score	Opposition Score	Opposition Score	Rank	Opposition Score	Opposition Score	Opposition Score	Opposition Score	Rank
Vasiliki-Zuzana Karampatsa; Afroditi Kosma; Aikaterini Spatharou; Nafsika Stavridou	Women's Tournament	Switzerland (Switzerland); L 16–18	Netherlands (Netherlands); W 13–8	Azerbaijan (Azerbaijan); L 15–21	3	Romania (Romania); W 15–6	Ukraine (Ukraine); L 19–21	Did not advance		

== Boxing ==
Men

Athlete	Event	Round of 32	Round of 16	Quarterfinals	Semifinals	Final / BM	
Athlete	Event	Opposition Score	Opposition Score	Opposition Score	Opposition Score	Opposition Score	Rank
Polyneikis Kalamaras	-81kg	Bosnjak (Bosnia and Herzegovina); L 0–3 WP	Did not advance				
Panagiotis Matsagkos	-60kg	McCormack (United Kingdom); L 0–3 WP	Did not advance				

== Canoe Sprint ==
Men

Athlete	Event	Heats		Semifinal		Final	
Athlete	Event	Time	Rank	Time	Rank	Time	Rank
Stylianos Chatzopoulos	Men's K1-200m	37.057	22	Did not advance			
Kyriakos Syriopoulos	Men's K1 1000m	3:51.165	6 Q	3:49.098	9	Did not advance	
Kyriakos Syriopoulos	Men's K1 5000m	—N/a				23:12.512	20

Women

Athlete	Event	Heats		Semifinal		Final	
Athlete	Event	Time	Rank	Time	Rank	Time	Rank
Sofia Pipitsouli	Women's K1 200m	45.270	22	Did not advance			
Sofia Pipitsouli	Women's K1 500m	2:05.547	9	Did not advance			

== Cycling ==
=== BMX ===
Athlete	Event	Qualifying Time Trial		Time Trial Super Final		Motos		Semifinals		Final	
Athlete	Event	Time	Rank	Time	Rank	Time	Rank	Time	Rank	Time	Rank
Ioannis Korfiatis	Men's	52.160	30	Did not advance							
Eirini Mavraki	Women's	52.169	14	Did not advance				—N/a		Did not advance	

=== Mountain Bike ===
Athlete	Event	Final	
Athlete	Event	Time	Rank
Dimitrios Antoniadis	Men's	LAP	27
Danai Stroumpouli	Women's	LAP	25

=== Road ===
Men

Athlete	Event	Final	
Athlete	Event	Time	Rank
Ioannis Tamouridis	Road Race	5:33:43	36
Charalampos Kastrantas	Road Race	DNF	
Polychronis Tzortzakis	Road Race	DNF	
Polychronis Tzortzakis	Individual Time Trial	1:09:24.51	35

Women

Athlete	Event	Final	
Athlete	Event	Time	Rank
Varvara Fasoi	Road Race	DNF	
Varvara Fasoi	Individual Time Trial	36:24.82	26

== Diving ==
Men

Athlete	Event	Preliminaries		Semifinals		Final	
Athlete	Event	Points	Rank	Points	Rank	Points	Rank
Konstantinos Koutsioumpis	1m Springboard	355.60	24	—N/a		Did not advance	
Konstantinos Koutsioumpis	3m Springboard	371.80	27	—N/a		Did not advance	
Dimitrios Molvalis	1m Springboard	395.55	15	—N/a		Did not advance	
Nikolaos Molvalis	3m Springboard	422.00	21	—N/a		Did not advance	
Nikolaos Molvalis; Dimitrios Molvalis	3m Synchronized	—N/a				237.75	10

== Fencing ==
Men

Athlete	Event	Pool Matches						Round of 32	Round of 16	Quarterfinal	Semifinal	Final / BM	
Athlete	Event	Opposition Score	Opposition Score	Opposition Score	Opposition Score	Opposition Score	Rank	Opposition Score	Opposition Score	Opposition Score	Opposition Score	Opposition Score	Rank
Nikolaos Kontochristopoulos	Foil	Daraban (Romania); W 5–2	Doerr (Germany); W 5–3	Rajski (Poland); L 2–5	Foconi (Italy); L 2–5	Meapstead (United Kingdom); W 4–3	4 q	Rosatelli (Italy); L 7–15	Did not advance				
Georges Tsouroutas	Sabre	Casares (Spain); L 1–5	Dolniceanu (Romania); L 2–5	Honeybone (United Kingdom); L 1–5	Taghiyev (Azerbaijan); L 3–5	Ant (Turkey); W 5–3	5	Did not advance					

Women

Athlete	Event	Pool Matches						Round of 32	Round of 16	Quarterfinal	Semifinal	Final / BM	
Athlete	Event	Opposition Score	Opposition Score	Opposition Score	Opposition Score	Opposition Score	Rank	Opposition Score	Opposition Score	Opposition Score	Opposition Score	Opposition Score	Rank
Aikaterini-Maria Kontochristopoulou	Foil	Erba (Italy); L 0–5	Walczyk (Poland); L 2–5	Schmel (Hungary); W 5–4	Golubutskyi (Germany); W 5–4	Alborova (Russia); L 0–5	5	Did not advance					
Vassiliki Vougiouka	Sabre	Criscio (Italy); W 5–3	Jelachi (Moldova); W 5–1	Hanzlikova (Czech Republic); W 5–2	Pasternak (Poland); W 5–1	Palu (France); W 5–1	1 Q	Bye	Vila (Spain); W 15–8	Bunyatova (Azerbaijan); L 12–15	Did not advance		

== Gymnastics ==
=== Artistic ===
Men
Individual

Athlete	Event	Qualification								Final							
Athlete	Event	Apparatus						Total	Rank	Apparatus						Total	Rank
Athlete	Event	F	PH	R	V	PB	HB	Total	Rank	F	PH	R	V	PB	HB	Total	Rank
Eleftherios Petrounias	Rings	—N/a		15.733	—N/a			15.733	1 Q	—N/a		15.633	—N/a			15.633	1st place, gold medalist(s)
Eleftherios Petrounias	Floor Exercise	13.966	—N/a					13.966	37	Did not advance							
Eleftherios Petrounias	Pommel Horse	—N/a	12.700	—N/a				12.700	48	Did not advance							
Eleftherios Petrounias	Parallel Bars	—N/a				12.633	—N/a	12.633	71	Did not advance							
Eleftherios Petrounias	Horizontal Bar	—N/a					12.133	12.133	73	Did not advance							
Eleftherios Petrounias	All-Around	13.966	12.700	15.733	14.300	12.633	12.133	81.465	30	Did not advance							
Vlasios Maras	Floor Exercise	13.733	—N/a					13.733	42	Did not advance							
Vlasios Maras	Pommel Horse	—N/a	12.966	—N/a				12.966	42	Did not advance							
Vlasios Maras	Rings	—N/a		12.066	—N/a			12.066	68	Did not advance							
Vlasios Maras	Parallel Bars	—N/a				13.733	—N/a	13.733	36	Did not advance							
Vlasios Maras	Horizontal Bar	—N/a					15.766	15.766	1 Q	—N/a					15.366	15.366	2nd place, silver medalist(s)
Nikolaos Iliopoulos	Floor Exercise	13.100	—N/a					13.100	60	Did not advance							
Nikolaos Iliopoulos	Pommel Horse	—N/a	13.233	—N/a				13.233	35	Did not advance							
Nikolaos Iliopoulos	Rings	—N/a		13.166	—N/a			13.166	43	Did not advance							
Nikolaos Iliopoulos	Parallel Bars	—N/a				13.666	—N/a	13.666	41	Did not advance							
Nikolaos Iliopoulos	Horizontal Bar	—N/a					13.966	13.966	23	Did not advance							
Nikolaos Iliopoulos	All-Around	13.100	13.233	13.166	14.233	13.666	13.966	81.364	31	Did not advance							

Team

Athlete	Event								
Athlete	Event	Apparatus						Total	Rank
Athlete	Event	F	PH	R	V	PB	HB	Total	Rank
Eleftherios Petrounias	Team	13.966	DSC	15.733	14.300	DSC		43.999	—N/a
Vlasios Maras	Team	13.733	12.966	DSC	—N/a	13.733	15.766	46.198	—N/a
Nikolaos Iliopoulos	Team	DSC	13.233	13.166	14.233	13.666	13.966	68.264	—N/a
Total	Team	27.699	26.199	28.899	28.533	27.399	29.732	168.461	10

Women
Individual

Athlete	Event	Qualification						Final					
Athlete	Event	Apparatus				Total	Rank	Apparatus				Total	Rank
Athlete	Event	V	UB	BB	F	Total	Rank	V	UB	BB	F	Total	Rank
Myropi Christofilaki	Uneven Bars	—N/a	8.600	—N/a		8.600	81	Did not advance					
Myropi Christofilaki	Balance Beam	—N/a		9.766	—N/a	9.766	76	Did not advance					
Myropi Christofilaki	Floor Exercise	—N/a			12.166	12.166	44	Did not advance					
Myropi Christofilaki	All-Around	13.200	8.600	9.766	12.166	43.732	73	Did not advance					
Vasiliki Millousi	Uneven Bars	—N/a	12.933	—N/a		12.933	22	Did not advance					
Vasiliki Millousi	Balance Beam	—N/a		13.600	—N/a	13.600	13	Did not advance					
Vasiliki Millousi	Floor Exercise	—N/a			11.700	11.700	58	Did not advance					
Vasiliki Millousi	All-Around	13.233	12.933	13.600	11.700	51.466	28 Q	13.300	11.766	12.933	11.600	49.599	16
Ioanna Xoulogi	Uneven Bars	—N/a	9.266	—N/a		9.266	77	Did not advance					
Ioanna Xoulogi	Balance Beam	—N/a		11.033	—N/a	11.033	63	Did not advance					
Ioanna Xoulogi	Floor Exercise	—N/a			11.566	11.566	60	Did not advance					
Ioanna Xoulogi	All-Around	12.766	9.266	11.033	11.566	44.631	71	Did not advance					

Team

Athlete	Event	Final					
Athlete	Event	Apparatus				Total	Rank
Athlete	Event	V	UB	BB	F	Total	Rank
Myropi Christofilaki	Team	13.200	DSC		12.166	25.366	—N/a
Vasiliki Millousi	Team	13.233	12.933	13.600	11.700	51.466	—N/a
Ioanna Xoulogi	Team	DSC	9.266	11.033	DSC	20.299	—N/a
Total	Team	26.433	22.199	24.633	23.866	97.131	16

=== Rhythmic ===
Greece has qualified one athlete after the performance at the 2013 Rhythmic Gymnastics European Championships.

Athlete	Event	Qualification						Final					
Athlete	Event	Hoop	Ball	Clubs	Ribbon	Total	Rank	Hoop	Ball	Clubs	Ribbon	Total	Rank
Varvara Filiou	Clubs	—N/a		16.950	—N/a	16.950	12	Did not advance					
Varvara Filiou	Ribbon	—N/a			17.500	17.500	9	Did not advance					
Varvara Filiou	Hoop	15.450	—N/a			15.450	20	Did not advance					
Varvara Filiou	Ball	—N/a	17.550	—N/a		17.550	10	Did not advance					
Varvara Filiou	All-Around	—N/a						15.450	17.550	16.950	17.500	67.450	14

=== Trampoline ===
Greece has qualified two athletes based on the results at the 2014 European Trampoline Championships. The gymnasts will compete in both the individual and the synchronized event.

Women

Athlete	Event	Qualification		Final	
Athlete	Event	Score	Rank	Score	Rank
Paraskevi Angelousi; Lila Kasapoglou	Synchronized	77.000	8	Did not advance	

== Judo ==
Men

Athlete	Event	Round of 64	Round of 32	Round of 16	Quarterfinals	Semifinals	Repechage	Final / BM	
Athlete	Event	Opposition Result	Opposition Result	Opposition Result	Opposition Result	Opposition Result	Opposition Result	Opposition Result	Rank
Georgios Azoidis	-73kg	Maddaloni (Italy); W 100-000	Ungvari (Hungary); L 000-101	Did not advance					
Ilias Iliadis	-90kg	Bye	Kukovica (Slovenia); W 101-000	Odenthal (Germany); W 010-000	Denisov (Russia); L 000s3-000s2	Did not advance	Kukolj (Serbia); W 000s2-000s3	Gviniashvili (Georgia (country)); W 000s2-000s3	3rd place, bronze medalist(s)
Roman Moustopoulos	-81kg	Bye	Chen (Israel); L 000-100	Did not advance					
Alexios Ntanatsidis	-81kg	Bye	Nacimiento Lorenzo (Spain); L 000-100	Did not advance					
Klimis Papachristos	+90kg Blind Judo	—N/a			Hayran (Turkey); W 100-000	Zakiyev (Azerbaijan); L 000-100	Bye	Mislimov (Azerbaijan); L 000-100	4

== Karate ==
Men

Athlete	Event	Pool Matches				Semifinal	Final / BM	
Athlete	Event	Opposition Score	Opposition Score	Opposition Score	Rank	Opposition Score	Opposition Score	Rank
Spyridon Margaritopoulos	Kumite +84kg	Atamov (Azerbaijan); W 2–0	Erkan (Turkey); L 0–8	Nestorovski (North Macedonia); D 0–0	3	Did not advance		
Michail Georgios Tzanos	Kumite −84kg	Horuna (Ukraine); W 8–0	Grillon (France); W 5–4	Mamayev (Azerbaijan); D 0–0	1 Q	Aktas (Turkey); W 2–1	Mamayev (Azerbaijan); L 1–1 Lose From Penalty	2nd place, silver medalist(s)

Women

Athlete	Event	Pool Matches				Semifinal	Final / BM	
Athlete	Event	Opposition Score	Opposition Score	Opposition Score	Rank	Opposition Score	Opposition Score	Rank
Vasiliki Panetsidou	Kumite −68kg	Zaretska (Azerbaijan); L 0–1	Vizcaino (Spain); W 6–3	Buchinger (Austria); L 1–2	3	Did not advance		

== Sambo ==
Men

Athlete	Event	Round of 16	Quarterfinals	Semifinals	Repechage	Final / BM	
Athlete	Event	Opposition Result	Opposition Result	Opposition Result	Opposition Result	Opposition Result	Rank
Mirmanis Iliadis	-74kg	Ivanov (Bulgaria); L 1–3 VP	Did not advance				

== Shooting ==
Men

Athlete	Event	Qualification		Semifinal		Final	
Athlete	Event	Points	Rank	Points	Rank	Points	Rank
Konstantinos Malgarinos	10m Air Pistol	571	24	—N/a		Did not advance	
Nikolaos Mavrommatis	Skeet	122	7	Did not advance			
Efthimios Mitas	Skeet	119	17	Did not advance			

Women

Athlete	Event	Qualification		Semifinal		Final	
Athlete	Event	Points	Rank	Points	Rank	Points	Rank
Anna Korakaki	10m Air Pistol	378	19	—N/a		Did not advance	
Anna Korakaki	25m Pistol	577	10	Did not advance			

Mixed

Athlete	Event	Qualification		Semifinal		Final	
Athlete	Event	Points	Rank	Points	Rank	Opposition Result	Rank
Konstantinos Malgarinos; Anna Korakaki	Mixed 10m Air Pistol	478	4 Q	239.6	1 Q	Germany (Germany); L 4–5	2nd place, silver medalist(s)

== Swimming ==
Men

Athlete	Event	Heat		Semifinal		Final	
Athlete	Event	Time	Rank	Time	Rank	Time	Rank
Dimitrios Dimitriou	200m Freestyle	1:52.51	18 Q	1:51.21	7 q	1:51.39	7
Dimitrios Dimitriou	400m Freestyle	3:55.15	5 Q	—N/a		3:52.57	2nd place, silver medalist(s)
Georgios Fragkoudakis	50m Breaststroke	29.34	25	Did not advance			
Georgios Fragkoudakis	100m Breaststroke	1:04.15	19	Did not advance			
Athanasios Charalampos Kynigakis	200m Butterfly	2:02.70	13 Q	2:00.23	6 q	2:00.26	6
Athanasios Charalampos Kynigakis	400m Medley	4:25.78	8 Q	—N/a		4:25.21	5
Konstantinos Meretsolias	100m Breaststroke	1:04.30	20	Did not advance			
Konstantinos Meretsolias	200m Breaststroke	2:17.06	10 Q	2:15.24	7 q	2:16.36	8
Konstantinos Meretsolias	400m Medley	4:25.78	8 Q	—N/a		4:25.21	5
Nikolaos Sofianidis	50m Backstroke	26.26	6 Q	26.03	5 q	25.92	5
Nikolaos Sofianidis	100m Backstroke	56.29	8 Q	55.58	7 Q	55.43	5
Nikolaos Sofianidis	200m Backstroke	2:03.18	11 Q	2:02.54	10	Did not advance	
Dimitrios Dimitriou; Georgios Fragkoudakis; Athanasios Charalampos Kynigakis; Nikolaos Sofianidis	4x100m Medley Relay	3:50.74	12	—N/a		Did not advance	

Women

Athlete	Event	Heat		Semifinal		Final	
Athlete	Event	Time	Rank	Time	Rank	Time	Rank
Eleni Kontogeorgou	50m Breaststroke	34.23	30	Did not advance			
Eleni Kontogeorgou	100m Breaststroke	1:14.65	29	Did not advance			
Eleni Kontogeorgou	200m Breaststroke	2:36.30	14 Q	2:35.74	12	Did not advance	
Ilektra Varvara Lebl	50m Butterfly	27.77	5 Q	27.77	10	Did not advance	
Ilektra Varvara Lebl	100m Butterfly	1:01.18	6 Q	1:00.43	4 Q	1:00.54	3rd place, bronze medalist(s)
Ilektra Varvara Lebl	200m Medley	2:21.90	14 Q	2:16.97	8 q	2:18.80	8
Ioanna Sacha	50m Backstroke	30.78	31	Did not advance			
Ioanna Sacha	100m Backstroke	1:05.09	17 Q	1:04.73	15	Did not advance	
Ioanna Sacha	200m Backstroke	2:18.66	9 Q	2:16.63	7 q	2:18.75	8

== Synchronized Swimming ==
Athlete	Event	Preliminary		Final	
Athlete	Event	Points	Rank	Points	Rank
Athanasia Tsola	Solo	156.1727	7 Q	156.4060	6
Athanasia Tsola; Giana Gkeorgkieva	Duet	156.0439	6 Q	155.6105	6
Athanasia Tsola; Giana Gkeorgkieva; Maria Eleni Armaou; Ifigeneia Dipla; Valentina Farantouri; Sofia Evangelia Malkogeorgou; Anastasia Taxopoulou; Anna Maria Taxopoulou; Vasiliki Kofidi; Maria Papadokostantaki	Team	152.1074	7 Q	151.1741	7
Athanasia Tsola; Giana Gkeorgkieva; Maria Eleni Armaou; Ifigeneia Dipla; Valentina Farantouri; Sofia Evangelia Malkogeorgou; Anastasia Taxopoulou; Anna Maria Taxopoulou; Vasiliki Kofidi; Maria Papadokostantaki	Free Combination	81.9000	6 Q	82.2333	6

== Table Tennis ==
Singles

Athlete	Event	Round 1	Round 2	Round 3	Quarterfinals	Semifinals	Final / BM	
Athlete	Event	Opposition Result	Opposition Result	Opposition Result	Opposition Result	Opposition Result	Opposition Result	Rank
Panagiotis Gionis	Men's Singles	Bye	Kou (Ukraine); L 2–4	Did not advance				
Kalinikos Kreanga	Men's Singles	Nuytinck (Belgium); W 4–3	Crisan (Romania); W 4–2	Gacina (Croatia); L3–4	Did not advance			

Team

Athlete	Event	Round 1	Quarterfinals	Semifinals	Final / BM	
Athlete	Event	Opposition Result	Opposition Result	Opposition Result	Opposition Result	Rank
Panagiotis Gionis; Kalinikos Kreanga; Konstantinos Papageorgiou	Men's Team	France (France); L1–3	Did not advance			

== Taekwondo ==
Men

Athlete	Event	Preliminary Round	Quarterfinals	Semifinals	Repechage	Final / BM	
Athlete	Event	Opposition Result	Opposition Result	Opposition Result	Opposition Result	Opposition Result	Rank
Georgios Simitsis	-58kg	Irgaliev (Russia); L 2–11 PTF	Did not advance				
Konstantinos Gkoltsios	+80kg	Cho (United Kingdom); W 10–5 PTF	Golec (Croatia); L 11–15 PTF	Did not advance			

Women

Athlete	Event	Preliminary Round	Quarterfinals	Semifinals	Repechage	Final / BM	
Athlete	Event	Opposition Result	Opposition Result	Opposition Result	Opposition Result	Opposition Result	Rank
Ioanna Koutsou	-49kg	Koutoukki (Cyprus); W 3–0 GDP	Abakarova (Azerbaijan); L 2–4 PTF	Did not advance			
Elpida Marina Dimitropoulou	-67kg	Niare (France); L 3–13 PTF	Did not advance				

== Triathlon ==
Athlete	Event	Swim (1.5 km)	Transition 1	Bike (40 km)	Transition 2	Run (9.9 km)	Total Time	Rank
James Chronis	Men's	19.36	0:43	57.32	0:26	DNF		
Grigoris Souvatzoglou	Men's	19:35	0:47	1:01:02	0:35	39.46	2:01:45	45
Deniz Dimaki	Women's	25:10	0:59	LAP				

== Volleyball ==
Beach

Athlete	Event	Group stage				Elimination round	Round of 16	Quarterfinal	Semifinal	Final / BM	
Athlete	Event	Opposition Score	Opposition Score	Opposition Score	Rank	Opposition Score	Opposition Score	Opposition Score	Opposition Score	Opposition Score	Rank
Georgios Kotsilianos; Nikos Zoupanis	Men's Beach volleyball	Latvia (Latvia); W 2–0	Ukraine (Ukraine); W 2–1	Italy (Italy); L 0–2	2 q	Czech Republic (Czech Republic); L 1–2	Did not advance				
Panagiota Karagkouni; Pigi Anna Metheniti	Women's Beach volleyball	Bulgaria (Bulgaria); W 2–0	Finland (Finland); L 0–2	Netherlands Sophie van Gestel; Jantine van der Vlist L 1–2	3 q	Netherlands Rimke Braakman; Jolien Sinnema L 0–2	Did not advance				

== Water polo ==
=== Men's tournament ===
Team	Event	Group stage				Qualifying round	Quarterfinal	Semifinal	Final / BM	
Team	Event	Opposition Score	Opposition Score	Opposition Score	Rank	Opposition Score	Opposition Score	Opposition Score	Opposition Score	Rank
Greece U-18 Men's	Men's Tournament	Montenegro (Montenegro); W 16–12	Turkey (Turkey); W 11–3	Croatia (Croatia); L 12–13	2 q	France (France); W 16–7	Hungary (Hungary); W 10–10 (PSO 5–3)	Serbia (Serbia); L 7–7 (PSO 5–6)	Croatia (Croatia); W 11–10	3rd place, bronze medalist(s)

=== Women's tournament ===
Team	Event	Group stage						Quarterfinal	Semifinal	Final / BM	
Team	Event	Opposition Score	Opposition Score	Opposition Score	Opposition Score	Opposition Score	Rank	Opposition Score	Opposition Score	Opposition Score	Rank
Greece U-18 Women's	Women's Tournament	Great Britain (United Kingdom); W 20–2	Netherlands (Netherlands); W 14–8	Hungary (Hungary); L 10–11	Germany (Germany); W 15–4	Israel (Israel); W 19–4	1 Q	Bye	Spain (Spain); L 6–9	Italy (Italy); W 8–7	3rd place, bronze medalist(s)

== Wrestling ==
Key:

- VT – Victory by Fall.
- PP – Decision by Points – the loser with technical points.
- PO – Decision by Points – the loser without technical points.
- ST – Technical superiority – the loser without technical points and a margin of victory of at least 8 (Greco-Roman) or 10 (Freestyle) points.

Men's Greco-Roman

Athlete	Event	Qualification	Round of 16	Quarterfinal	Semifinal	Repechage 1	Repechage 2	Final / BM	
Athlete	Event	Opposition Result	Opposition Result	Opposition Result	Opposition Result	Opposition Result	Opposition Result	Opposition Result	Rank
Apostolos Manouilidis	-59kg	Gucik (Poland); W 3–1 PP	Ciobanu (Moldova); L 0–4 ST	Did not advance					
Vladimiros Matias	-66kg	Levai (Slovakia); L 0–4 ST	Did not advance						
Petros Manouilidis	-75kg	Pyshkov (Ukraine); L 0–4 ST	Did not advance						
Nikolaos Varkas	-80kg	Bye	Matuzevicious (Lithuania); L 1–3 PP	Did not advance					
Dimitrios Papadopoulos	-85kg	Tamas (Romania); L 0–5 VT	Did not advance						
Laokratis Kesidis	-98kg	Bye	Timchenko (Ukraine); L 0–3 PO	Did not advance		Bye	Noumonvi (France); L 0–3 PO	Did not advance	
Alexandros Papadatos	-130kg	—N/a	Chugoshvili (Belarus); L 0–4 ST	Did not advance					

Men's Freestyle

Athlete	Event	Qualification	Round of 16	Quarterfinal	Semifinal	Repechage 1	Repechage 2	Final / BM	
Athlete	Event	Opposition Result	Opposition Result	Opposition Result	Opposition Result	Opposition Result	Opposition Result	Opposition Result	Rank
Theocharis Kalanidis	-57kg	Baskakov (Estonia); L 1–3 PP	Did not advance						
Niko Arouzmanidis	-65kg	Bye	Bucur (Romania); L 1–4 SP	Did not advance					
Georgios Savvoulidis	-74kg	Duba (Slovakia); W 4–0 ST	Geduev (Russia); L 0–3 PO	Did not advance		Shabanau (Belarus); L 0–4 ST	Did not advance		
Timofei Xenidis	-86kg	Bye	Aibuev (France); L 1–3 PP	Did not advance					
Micheil Tsikovani	-97kg	Bye	Andriitsev (Ukraine); L 0–4 ST	Did not advance					
Ioannis Arzoumanidis	-125kg	Mihailovs (Latvia); W 3–0 PO	Ligeti (Hungary); L 0–3 PO	Did not advance					

Women's Freestyle

Athlete	Event	Round of 16	Quarterfinal	Semifinal	Repechage	Final / BM	
Athlete	Event	Opposition Result	Opposition Result	Opposition Result	Opposition Result	Opposition Result	Rank
Agoro Papavasileiou	-63kg	Weinauge (Germany); L 1–3 PP	Did not advance				
Maria-Louiza Vryoni	-69kg	Fedarashka (Belarus); W 3–1 PP	Kratysh (Israel); L 0–3 PO	Did not advance	Bye	Vorobeva (Russia); L 0–5 VT	4
