= Triathlon at the 2015 European Games – Qualification =

A total of 130 athletes will compete at the 2015 European Games, 65 men and 65 women. A maximum of 12 NOCs may qualify three athletes per event. Other NOCs may have a maximum of two quota places per event. Three quota places will be allocated to the first 12 nations to have three athletes eligible through the qualification process.

== Qualification process ==
A number of qualification routes are available to reach the triathlon events at the 2015 European Games.

=== 2014 European Triathlon Championships ===
5 Quota places will be allocated to the National Olympic Committee (NOC) of the top five finishers at the 2014 European Triathlon Championships, held between 19–22 June 2014 in Kitzbühel, Austria. If any of the NOCs of the top five finishers has already earned three quota places (for example by having four of the top five finishers), then, the next highest finishing athlete earns the quota for his or her NOC.

=== European rankings ===
The 2014 ETU Points List as of 31 December 2014 will be used. 53 quota places will be allocated to the NOCs of the highest ranked athletes on the ETU Points List as of 31 December 2014, respecting the maximum quota allocation of three entries per NOC per event.

Athletes who have already qualified quota places will not be considered for this process. If this list is exhausted, the International Triathlon Union Points List will also be used. A maximum of twelve NOCs will be able to enter three athletes.

=== Host entries ===
The Host, Azerbaijan is guaranteed two quota places. These places will be allocated to the NOC of Azerbaijan only if the NOC has not earned any qualification places. If Azerbaijan has already earned quota places, unused places will be reallocated through the ETU Points List.

=== Universality ===
5 'universality' places will be decided by organisers to ensure a wider spread of nations can compete.

== Qualification timeline ==
| Event | Date | Venue |
|---|---|---|
| European Championships | 20–21 June 2014 | (Austria) Kitzbühel |
| Cutoff for rankings | 31 December 2014 | — |
| Universality allocation | TBA | — |

== Qualification summary ==
| Country | Men | Women | Total |
|---|---|---|---|
| Austria | 2 | 3 | 5 |
| Azerbaijan | 2 | 2 | 4 |
| Belarus | 1 | 1 | 2 |
| Belgium | 2 | 3 | 5 |
| Bulgaria | 0 | 1 | 1 |
| Croatia | 2 | 2 | 4 |
| Czech Republic | 2 | 3 | 5 |
| Denmark | 2 | 2 | 4 |
| Estonia | 0 | 1 | 1 |
| France | 3 | 3 | 6 |
| Germany | 3 | 3 | 6 |
| Great Britain | 3 | 3 | 6 |
| Greece | 1 | 0 | 1 |
| Hungary | 3 | 3 | 6 |
| Ireland | 2 | 0 | 2 |
| Israel | 3 | 2 | 5 |
| Italy | 3 | 3 | 6 |
| Luxembourg | 1 | 0 | 3 |
| Netherlands | 2 | 2 | 4 |
| Norway | 3 | 0 | 3 |
| Poland | 2 | 3 | 5 |
| Portugal | 3 | 1 | 4 |
| Russia | 3 | 3 | 6 |
| Spain | 3 | 3 | 6 |
| Serbia | 1 | 0 | 1 |
| Slovakia | 2 | 2 | 4 |
| Slovenia | 0 | 1 | 1 |
| Sweden | 0 | 2 | 2 |
| Switzerland | 3 | 3 | 6 |
| Turkey | 0 | 2 | 2 |
| Ukraine | 3 | 3 | 6 |
| 31 NOCs | 60 | 60 | 120 |

== Qualification progress ==
| Event | Places | Men | Women |
|---|---|---|---|
| Host nation | 2 | Azerbaijan; Azerbaijan | Azerbaijan; Azerbaijan |
| European Championships | 5 | Great Britain; Russia; Spain; Spain; Russia | Switzerland; Germany; Italy; Germany; Great Britain |
| ETU Points List | 53 | Russia; Spain; Ukraine; Ukraine; France; France; Germany; Norway; Israel; Italy; Belgium; Luxembourg; Belarus; Israel; Italy; Great Britain; France; Germany; Portugal; Portugal; Italy; Germany; Ukraine; Netherlands; Switzerland; Serbia; Belgium; Netherlands; Denmark; Great Britain; Czech Republic; Israel; Denmark; Switzerland; Croatia; Czech Republic; Hungary; Hungary; Austria; Portugal; Switzerland; Slovakia; Norway; Hungary; Greece; Ireland; Norway; Ireland; Poland; Slovakia; Poland; Austria; Croatia | Ukraine; Russia; Netherlands; Czech Republic; Ukraine; Germany; Russia; Russia; Slovenia; Great Britain; Spain; France; Italy; Italy; Hungary; Poland; Ukraine; Croatia; Poland; Estonia; Great Britain; France; Belgium; Switzerland; Poland; France; Czech Republic; Austria; Austria; Turkey; Belgium; Israel; Netherlands; Slovakia; Hungary; Switzerland; Turkey; Belgium; Slovakia; Belarus; Austria; Spain; Spain; Sweden; Hungary; Denmark; Finland; Portugal; Israel; Bulgaria; Sweden; Croatia; Denmark |
| Universality places | 5 | | |
| Total | | 65 | 65 |
