= Badminton at the 2015 European Games – Qualification =

160 athletes, 80 men and 80 women, will compete in five Badminton events at the 2015 European Games in Baku.

== Qualification ==
32 quota places are available for each singles event, and 16 places (involving 32 players) are available for each pairs event.

=== European rankings list ===
The Badminton World Federation (BWF) ranking list of 26 March 2015 will be used for deciding eligibility for the event. There will be no separate qualification event.

The BWF ranking list on that date will be used to form a European ranking list by removing all players who are not qualified to represent any European NOC and this European ranking list will then be used to allocate places.

=== Singles events ===
Singles players ranked 1 to 8 in the European ranking list for each singles event will be considered in turn and are eligible to enter, to a maximum of two per nation in each event. Singles players ranked 9 and lower in the European ranking list for each singles event will be considered in turn and are eligible to enter to a maximum of one per nation in that event. Therefore, for example, if an NOC has players ranked 1,4 and 7 in the European rankings, they will be eligible to enter two players; if they have players ranked 2 and 10, they will be eligible to enter one player.

=== Doubles events ===
Doubles pairs ranked 1 to 4 in the European ranking list for each doubles event will be considered in turn and are eligible to enter to a maximum of two pairs per nation in each event. Doubles pairs ranked 5 and lower in the European ranking list for each doubles event will be considered in turn and are eligible to enter one pair per nation in that event. Therefore, for example, if an NOC has pairs ranked 1 and 4 in the European rankings, they will be eligible to enter two pairs; if they have pairs ranked 3 and 12, they will be eligible to enter one pair.

=== Host quota places ===
Azerbaijan, as host, is entitled to enter two players; a maximum of one player/pair per event will be allowed. If additional Azeri players qualify under the regulations, they may also be entered. A number of 'universality' places will also be awarded to ensure a larger number of nations can compete in the event.

== Qualification summary ==
NOC	Men's Singles	Men's Doubles	Women's Singles	Women's Doubles	Mixed Doubles	Total	
NOC	Men's Singles	Men's Doubles	Women's Singles	Women's Doubles	Mixed Doubles	Quotas	Athletes
Austria	1		1		1	3	4
Azerbaijan	1		1			2	2
Belarus			1			1	1
Belgium	1	1	1	1	1	5	8
Bulgaria	1		1	1		3	4
Croatia	1	1	1			3	4
Czech Republic	1	1	1	1	1	5	8
Denmark	2	2	2	1	2	9	14
Estonia	1		1	1		3	4
Finland	1	1	1	1		4	6
France	1	1	1	1	1	5	8
Germany	1	1	1	1	1	5	8
Great Britain	1	1	1	1	1	5	8
Greece			1			1	1
Hungary	1		1			2	2
Iceland	1					1	1
Ireland	1	1	1	1	1	5	8
Israel	1					1	1
Italy	1	1	1			3	4
Latvia			1			1	1
Lithuania	1		1			2	2
Netherlands	1	1	1	1	1	5	8
Norway	1					1	1
Poland	1	1	1	1	1	5	8
Portugal	1		1			2	2
Russia	1	1	1	1	1	5	8
Serbia	1		1			2	2
Slovakia	1		1			2	2
Slovenia	1					1	1
Spain	1		2	1		4	5
Sweden	1		1		1	3	4
Switzerland	1		1		1	3	4
Turkey	1	1	1	1	1	5	8
Ukraine	1	1	1	1	1	5	8
