= Swimming at the 2015 European Games – Men's 400 metre freestyle =

Men's 400 metre freestyle at the 2015 European Games
- Venue: Aquatic Palace
- Dates: 23 June
- Competitors: 51 from 25 nations
- Winning time: 3:52.43

Medalists
gold medal	Paul Hentschel	Germany
silver medal	Dimitrios Dimitriou	Greece
bronze medal	Ernest Maksumov	Russia

The men's 400 metre freestyle event at the 2015 European Games in Baku took place on 23 June at the Aquatic Palace.

== Results ==
=== Heats ===
The heats were started at 10:07.

Rank	Heat	Lane	Name	Nationality	Time	Notes
1	6	6	Henning Mühlleitner	Germany	3:54.75	Q, GR
2	5	3	Nicolas D'Oriano	France	3:54.76	Q
3	5	4	Ernest Maksumov	Russia	3:54.77	Q
4	5	5	Marc Vivas	Spain	3:54.84	Q
5	5	6	Dimitrios Dimitriou	Greece	3:55.15	Q
6	5	2	Ricardo Rosales	Spain	3:55.22	Q
7	6	1	Marcos Rodríguez	Spain	3:55.30	
8	5	7	Paul Hentschel	Germany	3:55.70	Q
9	5	1	Guillem Pujol	Spain	3:55.87	
10	6	7	Thore Bermel	Germany	3:55.88	
11	5	8	Aleksandr Prokofev	Russia	3:55.97	Q
12	6	4	Cameron Kurle	Great Britain	3:56.03	
13	6	5	Kyle Chisholm	Great Britain	3:56.08	
14	6	8	Kaan Özcan	Turkey	3:56.12	
15	6	2	Marc Hinawi	Israel	3:56.61	
16	6	3	Moritz Brandt	Germany	3:56.73	
17	3	6	Grega Popović	Slovenia	3:57.27	
18	3	7	Kristóf Rasovszky	Hungary	3:57.28	
19	4	5	Erge Gezmis	Turkey	3:58.11	
20	4	6	Kyrylo Garaschenko	Ukraine	3:58.12	
21	6	0	Adam Staniszewski	Poland	3:58.65	
22	4	9	Mateusz Arndt	Poland	3:58.85	
23	5	9	Erik Arsland Gidskehaug	Norway	3:58.96	
24	4	4	Victor Johansson	Sweden	3:59.05	
25	4	7	Alessio Proietti Colonna	Italy	4:00.08	
26	2	4	Bogdan Scarlat	Romania	4:00.57	
27	4	1	Wiktor Jaszczak	Poland	4:00.64	
28	4	2	Logan Vanhuys	Belgium	4:01.03	
29	2	1	Filip Grimberg	Sweden	4:01.29	
30	3	0	Andrea Mozzini-Vellen	Switzerland	4:01.55	
31	3	2	Eivind Bjelland	Norway	4:01.95	
32	4	3	Alexander Trap	Belgium	4:02.09	
33	2	6	Alexandre Coutinho	Portugal	4:02.42	
33	3	3	Cla Remund	Switzerland	4:02.42	
35	2	7	Blaž Demšar	Slovenia	4:02.62	
36	5	0	Tom Derbyshire	Great Britain	4:02.82	
37	3	4	Lukas Ambros	Austria	4:03.29	
38	3	5	Evgeny Drobotov	Russia	4:03.58	
39	3	9	Borna Jukić	Croatia	4:03.95	
40	2	3	Guilherme Pina	Portugal	4:04.80	
41	6	9	Ilya Druzhinin	Russia	4:05.16	
42	3	1	Batuhan Hakan	Turkey	4:06.58	
43	4	0	Gustaf Dahlman	Sweden	4:07.43	
44	2	5	Frederik Jessen	Denmark	4:07.60	
45	3	8	Igor Kostovski	Croatia	4:08.76	
46	2	2	Markus Malm	Sweden	4:09.08	
47	1	4	Marius Ihlen Gardshodn	LEN ( Faroe Islands)	4:10.00	
48	4	8	João Gil	Portugal	4:10.57	
49	1	3	Kyriacos Papa-Adams	Cyprus	4:10.99	
50	2	8	Filip Hodur	Poland	4:13.88	
51	1	5	Franc Aleksi	Albania	4:19.05	

=== Final ===
The final was held at 18:21.

Rank	Lane	Name	Nationality	Time	Notes
1st place, gold medalist(s)	1	Paul Hentschel	Germany	3:52.43	GR
2nd place, silver medalist(s)	2	Dimitrios Dimitriou	Greece	3:52.57	
3rd place, bronze medalist(s)	3	Ernest Maksumov	Russia	3:52.65	
4	6	Marc Vivas	Spain	3:53.92	
5	5	Nicolas D'Oriano	France	3:54.28	
6	8	Aleksandr Prokofev	Russia	3:54.51	
7	4	Henning Mühlleitner	Germany	3:54.56	
8	7	Ricardo Rosales	Spain	3:54.57	
