= Swimming at the 2015 European Games – Men's 400 metre individual medley =

Men's 400 metre individual medley at the 2015 European Games
- Venue: Aquatic Palace
- Dates: 27 June
- Competitors: 45 from 25 nations
- Winning time: 4:19.44

Medalists
gold medal	Nikolay Sokolov	Russia
silver medal	Igor Balyberdin	Russia
bronze medal	Karol Zbutowicz	Poland

The men's 400 metre individual medley event at the 2015 European Games in Baku took place on 27 June at the Aquatic Palace.

== Results ==
=== Heats ===
The heats were started at 09:52.

Rank	Heat	Lane	Name	Nationality	Time	Notes
1	5	3	Nikolay Sokolov	Russia	4:24.22	Q, GR
2	4	3	Igor Balyberdin	Russia	4:24.53	Q
3	4	4	Karol Zbutowicz	Poland	4:24.72	Q
4	4	6	Tobias Niestroy	Germany	4:24.81	Q
5	4	5	Paul Hentschel	Germany	4:24.89	Q
6	3	5	Marek Osina	Czech Republic	4:25.59	Q
7	5	6	Dániel Sós	Hungary	4:25.67	Q
8	4	8	Athanasios Kynigakis	Greece	4:25.78	Q
9	5	2	Joe Litchfield	Great Britain	4:26.08	
10	4	7	Thomas Dal	Belgium	4:26.67	
11	5	7	Sebastian Steffan	Austria	4:27.05	
12	2	4	Erge Gezmis	Turkey	4:27.64	
13	3	7	João Vital	Portugal	4:27.84	
14	3	2	Batuhan Hakan	Turkey	4:28.54	
15	5	5	Nicolas D'Oriano	France	4:28.71	
16	4	2	Lorenzo Glessi	Italy	4:28.93	
17	3	1	Samet Alkan	Turkey	4:29.33	
18	5	9	Martyn Walton	Great Britain	4:29.59	
19	5	8	Luke Greenbank	Great Britain	4:29.87	
20	5	1	Jacques Läuffer	Switzerland	4:30.11	
21	3	4	Matteo Bertoldi	Italy	4:30.35	
22	4	0	Théo Berry	France	4:30.60	
23	2	3	Máté Kutasi	Hungary	4:31.23	
24	5	0	Henning Mühlleitner	Germany	4:31.73	
25	2	7	Patryk Adamczyk	Poland	4:31.88	
26	5	4	Joan Casanovas	Spain	4:32.15	
27	3	8	Pavel Bashura	Belarus	4:32.44	
28	2	9	Wojciech Ulatowski	Poland	4:33.57	
29	4	1	Jarvis Parkinson	Great Britain	4:33.77	
30	3	0	Andrew Moore	Ireland	4:34.29	
31	2	6	James Brown	Ireland	4:34.33	
32	1	7	Konstantinos Meretsolias	Greece	4:35.82	
33	2	5	Benjamin Doyle	Ireland	4:36.40	
34	1	6	Kyriacos Papa-Adams	Cyprus	4:36.98	
35	3	3	Oskar Ericsson	Sweden	4:37.71	
36	1	2	Silver Hein	Estonia	4:37.83	
37	3	6	Logan Vanhuys	Belgium	4:39.56	
38	2	2	Tomer Drori	Israel	4:41.01	
39	1	4	Blaž Demšar	Slovenia	4:42.68	
40	2	8	Bogdan Petre	Romania	4:42.80	
41	2	0	Kaloyan Nikolov	Bulgaria	4:42.88	
42	3	9	Denys Martynyuk	Ukraine	4:43.43	
43	2	1	Dawid Pietrzak	Poland	4:43.86	
44	1	5	Igor Proskura	Ukraine	4:45.30	
45	1	3	Ivan Adamovych	Ukraine	4:47.45	
	4	9	Giacomo Carini	Italy	DNS	

=== Final ===
The final was held at 17:43.

Rank	Lane	Name	Nationality	Time	Notes
1st place, gold medalist(s)	4	Nikolay Sokolov	Russia	4:19.44	GR
2nd place, silver medalist(s)	5	Igor Balyberdin	Russia	4:20.80	
3rd place, bronze medalist(s)	3	Karol Zbutowicz	Poland	4:22.22	
4	1	Dániel Sós	Hungary	4:22.23	
5	8	Athanasios Kynigakis	Greece	4:25.21	
6	2	Paul Hentschel	Germany	4:25.24	
7	6	Tobias Niestroy	Germany	4:25.26	
8	7	Marek Osina	Czech Republic	4:25.50	
