= Karate at the 2015 European Games – Men's kumite 84 kg =

Karate competition

Men's kumite 84 kg at the 2015 European Games
- Venue: Baku Crystal Hall
- Date: 14 June
- Competitors: 8 from 8 nations

Medalists
gold medal	Aykhan Mamayev	Azerbaijan
silver medal	Georgios Tzanos	Greece
bronze medal	Uğur Aktaş	Turkey

The men's kumite 84 kg competition at the 2015 European Games in Baku, Azerbaijan was held on 14 June 2015 at the Crystal Hall.

== Schedule ==
All times are Azerbaijan Summer Time (UTC+5).

Date	Time	Event
Sunday, 14 June 2015	11:00	Elimination Round
Sunday, 14 June 2015	16:00	Semifinals
Sunday, 14 June 2015	18:00	Finals

== Results ==
Legend

- KK — Forfeit (Kiken)

=== Elimination round ===
==== Group A ====
Athlete	Pld	W	D	L	Points		
Athlete	Pld	W	D	L	GF	GA	Diff
Alvin Karaqi (KOS)	3	3	0	0	10	2	+8
Uğur Aktaş (TUR)	3	2	0	1	21	6	+15
Nello Maestri (ITA)	3	1	0	2	4	14	-10
Kamil Warda (POL)	3	0	0	3	2	15	-13

	Score	
Nello Maestri (ITA)	2–0	Kamil Warda (POL)
Uğur Aktaş (TUR)	1–3	Alvin Karaqi (KOS)
Nello Maestri (ITA)	0–3	Alvin Karaqi (KOS)
Uğur Aktaş (TUR)	9–1	Kamil Warda (POL)
Kamil Warda (POL)	1–4	Alvin Karaqi (KOS)
Nello Maestri (ITA)	2–11	Uğur Aktaş (TUR)

==== Group B ====
Athlete	Pld	W	D	L	Points		
Athlete	Pld	W	D	L	GF	GA	Diff
Georgios Tzanos (GRE)	3	2	1	0	13	4	+9
Aykhan Mamayev (AZE)	3	2	1	0	12	4	+8
Yaroslav Horuna (UKR)	3	1	0	2	4	14	-10
Kenji Grillon (FRA)	3	0	0	3	5	12	-7

	Score	
Aykhan Mamayev (AZE)	0–0	Georgios Tzanos (GRE)
Kenji Grillon (FRA)	0–1	Yaroslav Horuna (UKR)
Aykhan Mamayev (AZE)	6–3	Yaroslav Horuna (UKR)
Kenji Grillon (FRA)	4–5	Georgios Tzanos (GRE)
Georgios Tzanos (GRE)	8–0	Yaroslav Horuna (UKR)
Aykhan Mamayev (AZE)	6–1	Kenji Grillon (FRA)

=== Finals ===
Semifinals
Alvin Karaqi (KOS)	1
Aykhan Mamayev (AZE)	6
Uğur Aktaş (TUR)	1
Georgios Tzanos (GRE)	2

Gold medal match
Aykhan Mamayev (AZE)	1
Georgios Tzanos (GRE)	1
Bronze medal match
Alvin Karaqi (KOS)	3
Uğur Aktaş (TUR)	4
