= Wrestling at the 2015 European Games – Men's freestyle 74 kg =

Men's freestyle 74 kg at the 2015 European Games
- Venue: Dowon Gymnasium
- Date: 17 June
- Competitors: 22 from 22 nations

Medalists
gold medal	Aniuar Geduev	Russia
silver medal	Soner Demirtaş	Turkey
bronze medal	Jabrayil Hasanov	Azerbaijan
bronze medal	Jumber Kvelashvili	Georgia

Men's freestyle 74 kg competition at the 2015 European Games in Baku, Azerbaijan, took place on 17 June at the Heydar Aliyev Arena.

== Schedule ==
All times are Azerbaijan Summer Time (UTC+05:00)

Date	Time	Event
Wednesday, 17 June 2015	10:00	Qualifications
Wednesday, 17 June 2015	11:00	1/8 finals
Wednesday, 17 June 2015	13:00	Quarterfinals
Wednesday, 17 June 2015	13:00	Semifinals
Wednesday, 17 June 2015	15:00	Repechage
Wednesday, 17 June 2015	19:00	Finals

== Results ==
Legend

- F — Won by fall

=== Final ===
Final
Soner Demirtaş (TUR)	0
Aniuar Geduev (RUS)	10

=== Top half ===
Qualifications

1/8 finals
Henri Selenius (FIN)	0
Soner Demirtaş (TUR)	10
Mihály Nagy (HUN)	0
Jabrayil Hasanov (AZE)	10
Hanoch Rachamin (ISR)	7
Carmelo Lumia (ITA)	11
Grigor Grigoryan (ARM)	8
Kiril Terziev (BUL)	11

Quarterfinals
Soner Demirtaş (TUR)	5^{F}
Jabrayil Hasanov (AZE)	3
Carmelo Lumia (ITA)	0
Kiril Terziev (BUL)	4^{F}

Semifinals
Soner Demirtaş (TUR)	6
Kiril Terziev (BUL)	3

=== Bottom half ===
Qualifications
Rustam Dudaieva (UKR)	2
Jumber Kvelashvili (GEO)	9^{F}
Stefan Reichmuth (SUI)	3
Alexandru Burcă (MDA)	6
Zelimkhan Khadjiev (FRA)	9
Alberto Martínez (ESP)	0
Aniuar Geduev (RUS)	6
Ali Shabanau (BLR)	0
Georgios Savvoulidis (GRE)	10
Michal Duba (SVK)	0

1/8 finals
Krystian Brzozowski (POL)	11
Osman Hajdari (ALB)	0
Georg Harth (GER)	2
Jumber Kvelashvili (GEO)	7
Alexandru Burcă (MDA)	0
Zelimkhan Khadjiev (FRA)	4
Aniuar Geduev (RUS)	4
Georgios Savvoulidis (GRE)	0

Quarterfinals
Krystian Brzozowski (POL)	2
Jumber Kvelashvili (GEO)	3
Zelimkhan Khadjiev (FRA)	0
Aniuar Geduev (RUS)	10

Semifinals
Jumber Kvelashvili (GEO)	0
Aniuar Geduev (RUS)	8^{F}

=== Repechage ===
Repechage round 1
Ali Shabanau (BLR)	10
Georgios Savvoulidis (GRE)	0

Repechage round 2
Henri Selenius (FIN)	0
Jabrayil Hasanov (AZE)	11
Ali Shabanau (BLR)	6
Zelimkhan Khadjiev (FRA)	5

Bronze medal match
Jabrayil Hasanov (AZE)	9
Kiril Terziev (BUL)	0
Ali Shabanau (BLR)	5
Jumber Kvelashvili (GEO)	6
