= Gymnastics at the 2015 European Games – Women's balance beam =

Women's balance beam at the 2015 European Games
- Venue: National Gymnastics Arena
- Dates: 20 June 2015
- Competitors: 6 from 6 nations

The Women's artistic gymnastics balance beam competition at the 2015 European Games was held in the National Gymnastics Arena, Baku on 20 June 2015.

== Medalists ==
Gold	Silver	Bronze
Netherlands; Lieke Wevers	Romania; Andreea Iridon	Switzerland; Giulia Steingruber

== Qualification ==
The top six gymnasts with one per country advanced to the final.

Rank	Gymnast	Nation	D Score	E Score	Pen.	Total	Qual.
1	Seda Tutkhalyan	Russia	6.300	8.300		14.600	Q
2	Aliya Mustafina	Russia	6.100	8.466		14.566	
3	Giulia Steingruber	Switzerland	6.000	8.400		14.400	Q
4	Victoria Komova	Russia	6.000	8.233		14.233	
5	Sophie Scheder	Germany	5.400	8.733		14.133	Q
6	Andreea Iridon	Romania	5.900	8.200		14.100	Q
7	Lieke Wevers	Netherlands	5.600	8.466		14.066	Q
8	Georgina Hockenhull	Great Britain	5.700	8.133		13.833	Q
9	Céline van Gerner	Netherlands	5.700	8.000		13.700	
10	Tutya Yilmaz	Turkey	6.100	7.600		13.700	R1
11	Anne Kuhm	France	5.500	8.166		13.666	R2
12	Marine Brevet	France	5.600	8.000		13.600	
13	Vasiliki Millousi	Greece	5.900	7.800	-0.100	13.600	R3

== Results ==
Oldest and youngest competitors

	Name	Country	Date of birth	Age
Youngest	Andreea Iridon	Romania	November 23, 1999	15 years, 6 months and 28 days
Oldest	Lieke Wevers	Netherlands	September 17, 1991	23 years, 9 months and 3 days

Position	Gymnast	D Score	E Score	Penalty	Total
1st place, gold medalist(s)	Lieke Wevers (NED)	5.500	8.700		14.200
2nd place, silver medalist(s)	Andreea Iridon (ROM)	5.800	8.200		14.000
3rd place, bronze medalist(s)	Giulia Steingruber (SUI)	5.600	8.100		13.700
4	Sophie Scheder (GER)	5.500	8.166		13.666
5	Seda Tutkhalyan (RUS)	6.200	7.366		13.566
6	Georgina Hockenhull (GBR)	4.300	7.533		11.833
