= Simão Almeida =

Brazilian politician (1944–2021)

Member of the Legislative Assembly of Paraíba
- In office 1 February 1991 – 31 January 1995

Personal details
- Born: Simão de Almeida Neto; 9 January 1944; João Pessoa, Brazil
- Died: 29 December 2021 (aged 77); João Pessoa, Brazil
- Political party: PCdoB

Simão de Almeida Neto (9 January 1944 – 29 December 2021) was a Brazilian politician.

== Biography ==
A member of the Communist Party of Brazil, he served in the Legislative Assembly of Paraíba from 1991 to 1995. Almeida died from a hemorrhagic stroke related to the complications of COVID-19 in João Pessoa on 29 December 2021, at the age of 77.
