= Gymnastics at the 2015 European Games – Men's rings =

Men's rings at the 2015 European Games
- Venue: National Gymnastics Arena
- Date: 20 June
- Competitors: 6 from 6 nations
- Winning score: 15.633

Medalists
gold medal	Eleftherios Petrounias	Greece
silver medal	Nikita Ignatyev	Russia
bronze medal	İbrahim Çolak	Turkey

The men's artistic gymnastics rings competition at the 2015 European Games was held at the National Gymnastics Arena on 20 June 2015.

== Qualification ==
The top six gymnasts with one per country advanced to the final.

Rank	Gymnast	D Score	E Score	Pen.	Total	Qual.
1	Eleftherios Petrounias (GRE)	6.800	8.933		15.733	Q
2	Ihor Radivilov (UKR)	6.700	8.866		15.566	Q
3	Oleg Verniaiev (UKR)	6.600	8.600		15.200	
4	Nikita Ignatyev (RUS)	6.600	8.400		15.000	Q
5	İbrahim Çolak (TUR)	6.600	8.233		14.833	Q
6	Oleg Stepko (AZE)	6.200	8.500		14.700	Q
7	Fabian Hambüchen (GER)	5.900	8.733		14.633	Q, WD
8	Guillaume Augugliaro (FRA)	6.000	8.600		14.600	R1
9	Nikolai Kuksenkov (RUS)	6.300	8.233		14.533	
10	Rokas Guščinas (LTU)	5.600	8.700		14.300	R2
11	Dzmitry Barkalau (BLR)	6.100	8.066		14.166	R3

== Final ==
Rank	Gymnast	D Score	E Score	Pen.	Total
1st place, gold medalist(s)	Eleftherios Petrounias (GRE)	6.800	8.833		15.633
2nd place, silver medalist(s)	Nikita Ignatyev (RUS)	6.600	8.733		15.333
3rd place, bronze medalist(s)	İbrahim Çolak (TUR)	6.500	8.633		15.133
4	Oleg Stepko (AZE)	6.200	8.266		14.466
5	Guillaume Augugliaro (FRA)	6.000	8.033		14.033
6	Ihor Radivilov (UKR)	6.600	7.266		13.866
