= Gymnastics at the 2015 European Games – Men's horizontal bar =

Men's horizontal bar at the 2015 European Games
- Venue: National Gymnastics Arena
- Date: 20 June
- Competitors: 6 from 6 nations
- Winning score: 15.533

Medalists
| gold medal | Fabian Hambüchen | Germany |
| silver medal | Vlasios Maras | Greece |
| bronze medal | Nikita Ignatyev | Russia |

The men's artistic gymnastics horizontal bar competition at the 2015 European Games was held at the National Gymnastics Arena on 20 June 2015.

== Qualification ==
The top six gymnasts with one per country advanced to the final.

| Rank | Gymnast | D Score | E Score | Pen. | Total | Qual. |
|---|---|---|---|---|---|---|
| 1 | Vlasios Maras (GRE) | 6.900 | 8.866 | | 15.766 | Q |
| 2 | Fabian Hambüchen (GER) | 7.000 | 8.633 | | 15.633 | Q |
| 3 | Oleg Verniaiev (UKR) | 6.500 | 8.900 | | 15.400 | Q |
| 4 | Nikita Ignatyev (RUS) | 6.800 | 8.566 | | 15.366 | Q |
| 5 | Marijo Možnik (CRO) | 6.200 | 8.900 | | 15.100 | Q |
| 6 | Andrey Likhovitskiy (BLR) | 6.400 | 8.600 | | 15.000 | Q |
| 7 | Nikolai Kuksenkov (RUS) | 6.500 | 8.466 | | 14.966 | |
| 8 | Dzmitry Barkalau (BLR) | 6.200 | 8.733 | | 14.933 | |
| 9 | Vlad Cotuna (ROU) | 6.300 | 8.500 | | 14.800 | R1 |
| 10 | Andreas Toba (GER) | 6.600 | 8.100 | | 14.700 | |
| 10 | Axel Augis (FRA) | 6.200 | 8.466 | | 14.666 | R2 |
| 12 | Sebastian Krimmer (GER) | 6.300 | 8.333 | | 14.633 | |
| 13 | Marios Georgiou (CYP) | 5.600 | 9.000 | | 14.600 | R3 |

== Final ==
| Rank | Gymnast | D Score | E Score | Pen. | Total |
|---|---|---|---|---|---|
| 1st place, gold medalist(s) | Fabian Hambüchen (GER) | 7.000 | 8.533 | | 15.533 |
| 2nd place, silver medalist(s) | Vlasios Maras (GRE) | 6.900 | 8.466 | | 15.366 |
| 3rd place, bronze medalist(s) | Nikita Ignatyev (RUS) | 6.800 | 8.366 | | 15.166 |
| 4 | Marijo Možnik (CRO) | 6.400 | 8.500 | | 14.900 |
| 5 | Oleg Verniaiev (UKR) | 6.800 | 8.100 | | 14.900 |
| 6 | Andrey Likhovitskiy (BLR) | 6.300 | 8.033 | | 14.333 |
