= Dimitrios Dimitriou (swimmer) =

Greek swimmer (born 1997)

Personal information
- Native name: Δημήτριος Δημητρίου
- Born: 31 July 1997 (age 27)
- Height: 179 cm (5 ft 10 in)
- Weight: 72 kg (159 lb)

Sport
- Sport: Swimming

Dimitrios Dimitriou (Greek: Δημήτριος Δημητρίου; born 31 July 1997) is a Greek swimmer. He competed in the men's 400 metre freestyle event at the 2016 Summer Olympics. He finished 41st in the heats with a time of 3:54.98 and did not qualify for the final.
