= Gymnastics at the 2015 European Games – Women's uneven bars =

Women's uneven bars at the 2015 European Games
- Venue: National Gymnastics Arena
- Dates: 20 June 2015
- Competitors: 6 from 6 nations

The Women's artistic gymnastics uneven bars competition at the 2015 European Games was held in the National Gymnastics Arena, Baku on 20 June 2015.

== Medalists ==
Gold	Silver	Bronze
Russia; Aliya Mustafina	Germany; Sophie Scheder	Romania; Andreea Iridon

== Qualification ==
The top six gymnasts with one per country advanced to the final.

Rank	Gymnast	Nation	D Score	E Score	Pen.	Total	Qual.
1	Aliya Mustafina	Russia	6.500	8.700		15.200	Q
2	Sophie Scheder	Germany	6.500	8.500		15.000	Q
3	Elisabeth Seitz	Germany	6.600	8.400		15.000	
4	Victoria Komova	Russia	6.600	8.266		14.866	
5	Noémi Makra	Hungary	5.900	8.566		14.466	Q
6	Seda Tutkhalyan	Russia	5.800	8.366		14.166	
7	Céline van Gerner	Netherlands	5.300	8.600		13.900	Q
8	Tea Ugrin	Italy	5.900	7.866		13.766	Q
9	Andreea Iridon	Romania	5.600	8.133		13.733	Q
10	Charlie Fellows	Great Britain	5.800	7.800		13.700	R1
11	Lieke Wevers	Netherlands	5.800	7.800		13.600	
12	Lisa Top	Netherlands	5.100	8.466		13.566	
13	Angelina Kysla	Ukraine	5.700	7.866		13.566	R2
14	Valentine Pikul	France	5.700	7.733		13.433	R3

== Results ==
Oldest and youngest competitors

	Name	Country	Date of birth	Age
Youngest	Andreea Iridon	Romania	November 23, 1999	15 years, 6 months and 28 days
Oldest	Aliya Mustafina	Russia	September 30, 1994	20 years, 8 months and 21 days

Position	Gymnast	D Score	E Score	Penalty	Total
1st place, gold medalist(s)	Aliya Mustafina (RUS)	6.500	8.900		15.400
2nd place, silver medalist(s)	Sophie Scheder (GER)	6.400	8.800		15.200
3rd place, bronze medalist(s)	Andreea Iridon (ROM)	5.500	7.300		12.800
4	Noémi Makra (HUN)	5.200	7.533		12.733
5	Céline van Gerner (NED)	5.300	7.366		12.666
6	Tea Ugrin (ITA)	5.700	6.833		12.533
