= Turkey at the 2015 European Games =

- IOC code: TUR
- NOC: Turkish Olympic Committee
- Website: www.olimpiyatkomitesi.org.tr

in Baku, Azerbaijan 12 – 28 June 2015
- Competitors: 191 in 23 sports
- Flag bearer: Enes Erkan
- Medals Ranked 14th: Gold 6 Silver 4 Bronze 19 Total 29

European Games appearances (overview)
- 2015; 2019; 2023; 2027

Turkey participated at the 2015 European Games, in Baku, Azerbaijan from 12 to 28 June 2015.

191 Turkish athletes (110 men and 81 women) competed in 23 sports.

== Medals by sport ==
Sport	Men				Women				Grand Total			
Sport	1st place, gold medalist(s)	2nd place, silver medalist(s)	3rd place, bronze medalist(s)	Total	1st place, gold medalist(s)	2nd place, silver medalist(s)	3rd place, bronze medalist(s)	Total	1st place, gold medalist(s)	2nd place, silver medalist(s)	3rd place, bronze medalist(s)	Total
Badminton	0	0	0	0	0	0	1	1	0	0	1	1
Boxing	0	0	1	1	0	0	1	1	0	0	2	2
Gymnastics Artistic	0	0	1	1	0	0	0	0	0	0	1	1
Judo	0	0	0	0	0	1	1	2	0	1	1	2
Karate	2	0	3	5	1	2	1	4	3	2	4	9
Shooting	0	0	1	1	0	0	0	0	0	0	1	1
Table tennis	0	0	0	0	0	0	1	1	0	0	1	1
Taekwondo	0	0	0	0	0	0	1	1	0	0	1	1
Volleyball	0	0	0	0	1	0	0	1	1	0	0	1
wrestling	2	1	5	8	0	0	2	2	2	1	7	10
Total	4	1	11	16	2	3	8	13	6	4	19	29

== Medalists ==
Medal	Name	Sport	Event	Date
Gold	Serap Özçelik	Karate	Women's 50 kg	13 June
Gold	Burak Uygur	Karate	Men's 67 kg	13 June
Gold	Enes Erkan	Karate	Men's 84+ kg	14 June
Gold	Rıza Kayaalp	wrestling	Men's Greco-Roman 130 kg	14 June
Gold	Taha Akgül	wrestling	Men's freestyle 125 kg	18 June
Gold	Merve Dalbeler; Gizem Güreşen Karadayı; Dicle Nur Babat; Kübra Akman; Polen Uslupehlivan; Seda Aslanyürek; Büşra Cansu; Güldeniz Önal Paşalıoğlu; Naz Aydemir Akyol; Neriman Özsoy; Gözde Yılmaz; Meliha İsmailoğlu; Aslı Kalaç; Çağla Akın	Volleyball	Women's tournament	27 June
Silver	Merve Çoban	Karate	Women's 61 kg	13 June
Silver	Meltem Hocaoğlu	Karate	Women's 68+ kg	14 June
Silver	Soner Demirtaş	wrestling	Men's freestyle 74 kg	17 June
Silver	Ebru Şahin	Judo	Women's 48 kg	25 June
Bronze	Erman Eltemur	Karate	Men's 75 kg	13 June
Bronze	Cenk İldem	wrestling	Men's Greco-Roman 98 kg	13 June
Bronze	Dilara Bozan	Karate	Women's Kata	14 June
Bronze	Uğur Aktaş	Karate	Men's 84 kg	14 June
Bronze	Mehmet Yakan	Karate	Men's Kata	14 June
Bronze	Metehan Başar	wrestling	Men's Greco-Roman 85 kg	14 June
Bronze	Merve Kenger	wrestling	Women's freestyle 53 kg	15 June
Bronze	Elif Jale Yeşilırmak	wrestling	Women's freestyle 58 kg	15 June
Bronze	Sezar Akgül	wrestling	Men's freestyle 57 kg	17 June
Bronze	Mustafa Kaya	wrestling	Men's freestyle 65 kg	17 June
Bronze	Yakup Gör	wrestling	Men's freestyle 70 kg	18 June
Bronze	Nur Tatar	Taekwondo	Women's 67 kg	18 June
Bronze	Melek Hu	Table tennis	Women's singles	19 June
Bronze	İbrahim Çolak	Gymnastics	Men's rings	20 June
Bronze	Abdullah Ömer Alimoğlu	Shooting	Men's 50 metre pistol	21 June
Bronze	Elif Nur Coşkun	Boxing	Women's 51 kg	24 June
Bronze	Muhammed Unlu	Boxing	Men's 49 kg	24 June
Bronze	Özge Bayrak; Neslihan Yiğit	Badminton	Women's doubles	26 June
Bronze	Belkıs Zehra Kaya	Judo	Women's +78 kg	27 June

== Archery ==
Athlete	Event	Ranking round		Round of 64	Round of 32	Round of 16	Quarterfinals	Semifinals	Final / BM	
Athlete	Event	Score	Seed	Opposition Score	Opposition Score	Opposition Score	Opposition Score	Opposition Score	Opposition Score	Rank
Fatih Bozlar	Men's individual	643	44	(Belgium) Ramaekers (BEL) (21); L 4–6	Did not advance					33
Mete Gazoz	Men's individual	641	46	(Ukraine) Ruban (UKR) (19); L 3–7	Did not advance					33
Yağız Yılmaz	Men's individual	668	11	(Slovenia) Komocar (SLO) (54); W 7–3	(United Kingdom) Slater (GBR) (43); L 0–6	Did not advance				17
Aybüke Aktuna	Women's individual	623	39	(Finland) Kuoppa (FIN) (26); W 6–2	(Russia) Stepanova (RUS) (7); L 2–6	Did not advance				17
Begünhan Ünsal	Women's individual	621	41	(Georgia (country)) Esebua (GEO) (24); W 6–2	(Germany) Winter (GER) (9); L 5–6	Did not advance				17
Yasemin Ecem Anagöz	Women's individual	642	13	(Norway) Blomen Ridderstrom (NOR) (52); W 6–2	(Belarus) Tolkach (BLR) (45) W 6–2	(Georgia (country)) Narimanidze (GEO) (45) W 6–4	(Greece) Psarra (GRE) (9); L 0–6	Did not advance		5
Fatih Bozlar; Mete Gazoz; Yağız Yılmaz	Men's Team	1952	10	—N/a		Spain (ESP) (7); L 4–5	Did not advance			9
Aybüke Aktuna; Begünhan Ünsal; Yasemin Ecem Anagöz	Women's Team	1886	10	—N/a		France (FRA) (7); L 2–6	Did not advance			9
Yağız Yılmaz; Yasemin Ecem Anagöz	Mixed Team	1310	7	—N/a		Belarus (BLR) (10); L 0–6	Did not advance			9

== Badminton ==
Athlete	Event	Group Stage				Round of 16	Quarterfinal	Semifinal	Final / BM	
Athlete	Event	Opposition Score	Opposition Score	Opposition Score	Rank	Opposition Score	Opposition Score	Opposition Score	Opposition Score	Rank
Emre Vural	Men's singles	(Switzerland) Bonny (SUI); W 21–9, 21–14	(Czech Republic) Koukal (CZE); L 13–21, 8–21	(Serbia) Bjelan (SRB); W 21–10, 17–21, 21–9	2 Q	(Lithuania) Navickas (LTU); L 11–21, 13–21	Did not advance			
Emre Vural; Sinan Zorlu	Men's doubles	(Azerbaijan) Qalandarov; Rzayev (AZE); W 21–7, 21–14	(Russia) Ivanov; Sozonov (RUS); L 11–21, 11–21	(France) Kersaudy; Mittelheisser (FRA); L 13–21, 16–21	3	—N/a	Did not advance			
Neslihan Yiğit	Women's singles	(Russia) Polikarpova (RUS); W 18–21, 21–14, 21–3	(Croatia) Sutara (CRO); W 21–6, 21–10	(Greece) Karkantzia (GRE); W 21–6, 21–9	1 Q	(France) Lansac (FRA); L 21–8, 10–21, 11–21	Did not advance			
Neslihan Yiğit; Özge Bayrak	Women's doubles	(Spain) Molina; Ojeda (ESP); W 21–12, 21–12	(Czech Republic) Krizkova; Tomalova (CZE); W 22–20, 21–8	(Croatia) Galenic; Poznanovic (CRO); W 21–8, 21–12	1 Q	—N/a	(France) Baumann; Fontaine (FRA); W 21–11, 21–19	(Bulgaria) S Stoeva; G Stoeva (BUL); L 14–21, 9–21	Did not advance	3rd place, bronze medalist(s)
Melih Turgut; Fatma Nur Yavuz	Mixed doubles	(Slovenia) Flis; Stankovic (SLO); W 21–17, 21–15	(Denmark) Nøhr; Thygesen (DEN); L 6–21, 7–21	(Ukraine) Natarov; Kazarinova (UKR); L 11–21, 21–17, 16–21	3	—N/a	Did not advance			

== Basketball (3x3) ==
- Men's team – 1 team of 4 athletes
- Women's team – 1 team of 4 athletes

=== Men's tournament ===
Team

- Ahmet Yılmaz
- Enver Ekmen
- Hasan Aksoyak
- Kıvanç Dinler

Group Play

Pos	Team	Pld	W	D	L	PF	PA	PD	Pts	Qualification
1	Russia	3	3	0	0	61	46	+15	6	Qualification to eighth finals
2	Spain	3	2	0	1	55	41	+14	4	Qualification to eighth finals
3	Belgium	3	1	0	2	46	61	−15	2	Qualification to eighth finals
4	Turkey	3	0	0	3	47	61	−14	0	Qualification to eighth finals

First match(es) will be played: 23 June 2015. Source: baku2015.com

23 Jun 2015
12:55

Game 1

Russia 21, Belgium 12

Basketball Arena, Baku

23 Jun 2015
14:35

Game 2

Turkey 9, Spain 19

Basketball Arena, Baku

23 Jun 2015
17:45

Game 3

Belgium 21, Turkey 20

Basketball Arena, Baku

24 Jun 2015
12:55

Game 4

Russia 19, Spain 16

Basketball Arena, Baku

24 Jun 2015
14:35

Game 5

Belgium 13, Spain 20

Basketball Arena, Baku

24 Jun 2015
17:45

Game 6

Russia 21, Turkey 18

Basketball Arena, Baku

Eighth Finals

25 Jun 2015
17:30

Game 1

Serbia 21, Turkey 13

Basketball Arena, Baku

== Boxing ==
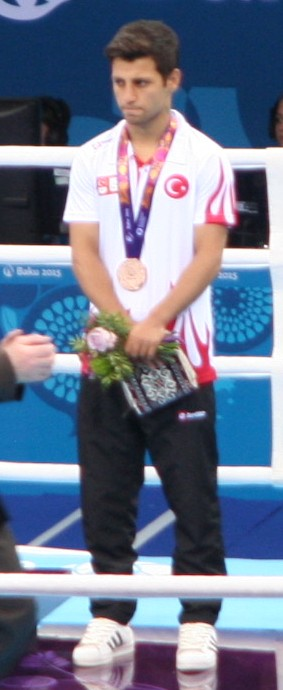
Muhammed Unlu at the awarding ceremony

Athlete	Event	Round of 32	Round of 16	Quarterfinals	Semifinals	Final	
Athlete	Event	Opposition Result	Opposition Result	Opposition Result	Opposition Result	Opposition Result	Rank
Muhammed Unlu	Men's 49 kg	—N/a	BYE	(Israel) Alaverdian (ISR); W 3–0	(Russia) Sagaluev (RUS); L 0–3	Did not advance	3rd place, bronze medalist(s)
Ferhat Pehlivan	Men's 52 kg	BYE	(France) Konki (FRA); W 3–0	(Italy) Picardi (ITA); L 1–2	Did not advance		5
Selçuk Eker	Men's 56 kg	BYE	(United Kingdom) Ashfaq (GBR); L 1–2	Did not advance			9
Yasin Yılmaz	Men's 60 kg	(Germany) Gashi (GER); W TKO	(Slovakia) Zatorsky (SVK); W 2–1	(Republic of Ireland) McComb (IRL); L 0–3	Did not advance		5
Adem Avcı	Men's 64 kg	(Hungary) Vadasz (HUN); W 3–0	(Italy) Mangiacapre (ITA); L 0–3	Did not advance			9
Önder Şipal	Men's 69 kg	BYE	(Georgia (country)) Abashidze (GEO); L 0–3	Did not advance			9
Cem Karlıdağ	Men's 81 kg	(Slovenia) Lazar (SLO); W TKO	(Netherlands) Mullenberg (NED); L 0–3	Did not advance			9
Bahram Muzaffer	Men's 91 kg	(Estonia) Karlson (EST); W 2–1	(Belarus) Charnabayeu (BLR); W 3–0	(Croatia) Filipi (CRO); L 0–3	Did not advance		5
Ali Demirezen	Men's +91 kg	BYE	(Germany) Keller (GER); W 3–0	(Azerbaijan) Majidov (AZE); L 0–3	Did not advance		5
Elif Nur Coşkun	Women's 51 kg	—N/a	(Ukraine) Kob (UKR); W 2–1	(Germany) Wahner (GER); W 3–0	(United Kingdom) Adams (GBR); L 0–3	Did not advance	3rd place, bronze medalist(s)
Ayşe Taş	Women's 54 kg	—N/a	BYE	(Russia) Saveleva (RUS); L 0–3	Did not advance		5
Gamze Başar	Women's 60 kg	—N/a	(Sweden) Lundblad (SWE); L 0–3	Did not advance			9
Sema Çalışkan	Women's 75 kg	—N/a	BYE	(Germany) Scheurisch (GER); L 1–2	Did not advance		5

== Canoe sprint ==
Athlete	Event	Heats		Semifinals		Finals	
Athlete	Event	Time	Rank	Time	Rank	Time	Rank
Mustafa Gülbahar	Men's K1-200m	36.916	7 QS	35.969	6 QFB	37.204	14
Gábor Bozsik	Men's K1-1000m	3:38.071	2 QS	3:26.322	4 QFB	3:37.402	16
Gábor Bozsik	Men's K1-5000m	—N/a				DSQ	
Kerim Tenha	Men's C1-200m	46.840	6 QS	46.760	9 X	Did not advance	
Kerim Tenha	Men's C1-1000m	4:38.160	7 QS	DSQ		Did not advance	
Lasma Liepa	Women's K1-200m	42.080	6 QS	42.000	7 QFB	43.800	15
Lasma Liepa	Women's K1-500m	1:56.486	7 QS	1:56.007	7 QFB	2:16.028	17
Ines Esteves	Women's K1-5000m	—N/a				25:10.326	16
ElizabethBates; Ines Esteves	Women's K2-200m	40.184	7 QS	38.347	5 X	Did not advance	
ElizabethBates; Ines Esteves	Women's K2-500m	1:47.593	7 QS	1:46.903	8 X	Did not advance	

== Cycling ==
=== Road cycling ===
Athlete	Event	Time	Rank
Miraç Kal	Men's road race	5:42:25	58
Onur Balkan	Men's road race	DNF	
Ahmet Örken	Men's road race	DNF	
Ahmet Örken	Men's time trial	1:10:14.44	36
Ayşenur Turgut	Women's road race	DNF	
Ayşenur Turgut	Women's time trial	41:53.64	30

=== Mountain biking ===
Athlete	Event	Time	Rank
Abdulkadir Kelleci	Men's cross country	LAP	25
Esra Kürkçü	Women's cross country	LAP	24

== Diving ==
Athlete	Event	Qualification		Final	
Athlete	Event	Points	Rank	Points	Rank
Kıvanç Gür	Men's platform	391.25	12 Q	405.20	9

== Fencing ==
Athlete	Event	Group Stage						Round of 32	Round of 16	Quarterfinal	Semifinal	Final / BM	
Athlete	Event	Opposition Score	Opposition Score	Opposition Score	Opposition Score	Opposition Score	Rank	Opposition Score	Opposition Score	Opposition Score	Opposition Score	Opposition Score	Rank
İbrahim Ahmet Ant	Men's individual sabre	(Greece) Tsouroutas (GRE); L 3–5	(United Kingdom) Honeybone (GBR); L 0–5	(Spain) Casares (ESP); L 1–5	(Azerbaijan) Taghiyev (AZE); W 5–3	(Romania) Dolniceanu (ROU); L 3–5	5	Did not advance					
Tevfik Burak Babaoğlu	Men's individual foil	(Italy) Rosatelli (ITA); L 3–5	(Poland) Janda (POL); W 5–3	(Russia) Arslanov (RUS); L 2–5	(France) Pauty (FRA); W 5–2	(United Kingdom) Kruse (GBR); L 3–5	1 Q	(Italy) Nista (ITA); L 8–15	Did not advance				
Ilgın Sarban	Women's individual sabre	(Azerbaijan) Bunyatova (AZE); L 2–5	(France) Stoltz (FRA); L 2–5	(Italy) Gargano (ITA); L 1–5	(Poland) Wątora (POL); L 2–5	(Ukraine) Kharlan (UKR); W 5–3	6	Did not advance					
İrem Karamete	Women's individual foil	(Germany) Schmitz (GER); L 3–5	(Croatia) Dajcic (CRO); W 5–3	(Belgium) Groslambert (BEL); W 5–1	(Italy) Volpi (ITA); L 1–5	(France) Gebet (FRA); L 4–5	4 Q	(Russia) Zagidullina (RUS); L 1–15	Did not advance				

== Gymnastics ==
=== Artistic ===
Men
Team

Athlete	Event	Qualification							
Athlete	Event	Apparatus						Total	Rank
Athlete	Event	F	PH	R	V	PB	HB	Total	Rank
Ferhat Arıcan	Team	14.066	14.266	13.500	14.766 Q	15.366 Q	13.866	85.830	8 Q
İbrahim Çolak	Team	—N/a		14.833 Q	—N/a	13.400	—N/a		
Ümit Şamiloğlu	Team	—N/a					12.966		
Total	Team	14.066	14.266	28.333	14.766	28.766	26.832	127.029	26

Individual

Athlete	Event	Final							
Athlete	Event	Apparatus						Total	Rank
Athlete	Event	F	PH	R	V	PB	HB	Total	Rank
Ferhat Arıcan	All-around	14.300	12.833	12.900	14.666	15.033	13.400	83.132	11

Apparatus

Athlete	Event	Total	Rank
İbrahim Çolak	Rings	15.133	3rd place, bronze medalist(s)
Ferhat Arıcan	Vault	14.566	6
Ferhat Arıcan	Parallel bars	14.300	6

Women
Individual

Athlete	Event	Final					
Athlete	Event	Apparatus				Total	Rank
Athlete	Event	F	V	UB	BB	Total	Rank
Tutya Yılmaz	All-around	13.766	11.966	12.333	12.766	50.831	13

== Judo ==
Men's

Athlete	Event	Round of 64	Round of 32	Round of 16	Quarterfinals	Semifinals	Repechage	Final / BM	
Athlete	Event	Opposition Result	Opposition Result	Opposition Result	Opposition Result	Opposition Result	Opposition Result	Opposition Result	Rank
Ahmet Şahin Kaba	60 kg	—N/a	(Slovenia) Trbovc (SLO); L 1–110s2	Did not advance					
Sinan Sandal	66 kg	—N/a	(Azerbaijan) Shikhalizada (AZE); L 0s1–100	Did not advance					
Hasan Vanlıoğlu	73 kg	(Republic of Ireland) Fleming (IRL); W 100–0	(Russia) Iartcev (RUS); L 0s2–0s1	Did not advance					
Bayram Ceylan	73 kg	(France) Urani (FRA); L 0s4–100	Did not advance						
Batuhan Efemgil	90 kg	BYE	(Georgia (country)) Gviniashvili (GEO); L 000–100	Did not advance					
Burak Serbest	+100 kg	—N/a	(Serbia) Božinić (SRB); L 000–100	Did not advance					
Dursun Hayran	Visually impaired +90 kg	—N/a			(Greece) Papachristos (GRE); L 0–100s1	Did not advance	BYE	(Russia) Parasiuk (RUS); L 000–101	

Women's

Athlete	Event	Round of 32	Round of 16	Quarterfinals	Semifinals	Repechage	Final / BM	
Athlete	Event	Opposition Result	Opposition Result	Opposition Result	Opposition Result	Opposition Result	Opposition Result	Rank
Ebru Şahin	48 kg	(Israel) Rishony (ISR); W 001–000	(Romania) Ungureanu (ROU); W 100–000	(Spain) Figueroa (ESP); W 000–000	(Ukraine) Cherniak (UKR); W 004–000	—N/a	(Belgium) Van Snick (BEL); L 000–001	2nd place, silver medalist(s)
Dilara Lokmanhekim	48 kg	Bye	(Poland) Konieczny (POL); W 002–000	(Belgium) Van Snick (BEL); L 000–101	—N/a	(Hungary) Csernoviczki (HUN); L 000–100	Did not advance	
Ayşe Arca	52 kg	(Switzerland) Tschopp (SUI); L 000–010	Did not advance					
Şükran Bakacak	70 kg	(Israel) Wildikan (ISR); L 001–000	Did not advance					
Gülşah Kocatürk	+78 kg	Bye	(San Marino) Zannoni (SMR); W 100–000	(Belarus) Slutskaya (BLR); L 000–000	(Lithuania) Pakenytė (LTU); L 000–100	Did not advance		
Belkız Zehra Kaya	+78 kg	Bye	(Bosnia and Herzegovina) Cerić (BIH); W 101–000	(Ukraine) Iaromka (UKR); W 100–000	(France) Andéol (FRA); L 000–001	—N/a	(Lithuania) Pakenytė (LTU); W 111–000	3rd place, bronze medalist(s)
Gülhan Kılıç	Visually impaired 57 kg	—N/a		(Germany) Brussig (GER); L 000–001	—N/a	(Russia) Ovchinnikova (RUS); W 100–000	(Ukraine) Nikolaychyk (UKR); L 000–100	
Şerife Köseoğlu	Visually impaired 57 kg	—N/a		(Ukraine) Nikolaychyk (UKR); L 000–101	—N/a	(Spain) Merenciano (ESP); W 110–001	(Germany) Brussig (GER); L 000–110	

== Karate ==
Men's

Athlete	Event	Group phase				Semifinal	Final / BM	
Athlete	Event	Opposition Score	Opposition Score	Opposition Score	Rank	Opposition Score	Opposition Score	Rank
Burak Uygur	Men's 67 kg	(Hungary) Yves Martial Tadissi (HUN); W 2–0	(Germany) Giegler (GER); L 0–1	(Croatia) Domdjoni (CRO); D 0–0	2 Q	(Azerbaijan) Aliyev (AZE); W 4–1	(France) Da Costa (FRA); W 3–3	1st place, gold medalist(s)
Erman Eltemur	Men's 75 kg	(Latvia) Sadikovs (LAT); W 1–0	(Azerbaijan) Aghayev (AZE); W 5–3	(Ukraine) Nikulin (UKR); W 4–0	1 Q	(Italy) Busà (ITA); L 4–4	(Germany) Bitsch (GER); W 5–0	3rd place, bronze medalist(s)
Uğur Aktaş	Men's 84 kg	(Kosovo) Karaqi (KOS); L 1–3	(Poland) Warda (POL); W 9–1	(Italy) Maestri (ITA); W 11–2	2 Q	(Greece) Tzanos (GRE); L 1–2	(Kosovo) Karaqi (KOS); W 4–3	3rd place, bronze medalist(s)
Enes Erkan	Men's 84+ kg	(Azerbaijan) Atamov (AZE); W 10–1	(Greece) Margaritopoulos (GRE); W 8–0	(North Macedonia) Nestorovski (MKD); W 3–0	1 Q	(Serbia) Bitevic (SRB); W 2–1	(Germany) Horne (GER); W 2–1	1st place, gold medalist(s)
Mehmet Yakan	Men's Kata	(Azerbaijan) Baljanli (AZE); W 5–0	(Romania) Guta (ROU); W 5–0	(France) Dack (FRA); W 4–1	1 Q	(Italy) Busato (ITA); L 2–3	(France) Dack (FRA); W 4–1	3rd place, bronze medalist(s)

Women's

Athlete	Event	Group phase				Semifinal	Final / BM	
Athlete	Event	Opposition Score	Opposition Score	Opposition Score	Rank	Opposition Score	Opposition Score	Rank
Serap Özçelik	Women's 50 kg	(Croatia) Berulec (CRO); W 3–0	(Azerbaijan) Aliyeva (AZE); W 6–0	(Austria) Plank (AUT); W 3–0	1 Q	(Ukraine) Kryva (UKR); W 0–0	(Austria) Plank (AUT); W 1–0	1st place, gold medalist(s)
Tuba Yakan	Women's 55 kg	(Croatia) Kovacevic (CRO); D 0–0	(Azerbaijan) Gasimova (AZE); L 0–1	(Luxembourg) Warling (LUX); W 5–0	3	Did not advance		
Merve Çoban	Women's 61 kg	(Croatia) Lenard (CRO); D 0–0	(Slovakia) Suchánková (SVK); W 2–0	(Azerbaijan) Abiyeva (AZE); W 2–1	1 Q	(Slovenia) Ristić (SLO); W 6–0	(France) Ignace (FRA); L 1–1	2nd place, silver medalist(s)
Hafsa Şeyda Burucu	Women's 68 kg	(Montenegro) Rakovic (MNE); D 0–0	(Switzerland) Quirici (SUI); L 0–1	(Iceland) Frimannsdottir (ISL); W 10–1	3	Did not advance		
Meltem Hocaoğlu	Women's 68+ kg	(Croatia) Martinović (CRO); W 5–1	(Russia) Zaytseva (RUS); D 0–0	(Finland) Kuusisto (FIN); W 1–0	1 Q	(Sweden) Antunovic (SWE); W 3–2	(Croatia) Martinović (CRO); L 0–5	2nd place, silver medalist(s)
Dilara Bozan	Women's Kata	(Croatia) Kiuk (CRO); W 5–0	(Azerbaijan) Gurbanova (AZE); W 5–0	(Germany) Bluel (GER); W 4–1	1 Q	(France) Scordo (FRA); L 2–3	(Germany) Bleul (GER); W 5–0	3rd place, bronze medalist(s)

== Sambo ==
Athlete	Event	Round of 16	Quarterfinal	Semifinal	Final / BM	
Athlete	Event	Opposition Score	Opposition Score	Opposition Score	Opposition Score	Rank
Yahya Karataş	Men's 74 kg	(France) Amoros (FRA); L 1–3	Did not advance			

== Shooting ==
Athlete	Event	Qualification		Final	
Athlete	Event	Points	Rank	Points	Rank
İsmail Keleş	Men's 10 metre air pistol	581	5 QF	157.8	4
Yusuf Dikeç	Men's 10 metre air pistol	578	9	Did not advance	
Yusuf Dikeç	Men's 50 metre pistol	564	3 QF	86.9	7
Abdullah Ömer Alimoğlu	Men's 50 metre pistol	559	5 QF	167.1	3rd place, bronze medalist(s)
Oğuzhan Tüzün	Men's trap	119	15	Did not advance	
Serdağ Saadet Kandıra	Women's trap	70	6 QF	7	6
Oğuzhan Tüzün; Serdağ Saadet Kandıra	Mixed Trap	83	9	Did not advance	

== Swimming ==
Athlete	Event	Heat		Semifinals		Final	
Athlete	Event	Time	Rank	Time	Rank	Time	Rank
Hüseyin Emre Sakçı	Men's 50 metre freestyle	22.81	2 Q	22.78	1 Q	22.75	4
Hüseyin Emre Sakçı	Men's 100 metre freestyle	50.85	6 Q	50.74	9	Did not advance	
Batuhan Hakan	Men's 200 metre freestyle	1:56.12	43	Did not advance			
Erge Can Gezmiş	Men's 200 metre freestyle	1:51.62	8 Q	1:51.63	3	Did not advance	
Kaan Özcan	Men's 200 metre freestyle	1:53.92	29	Did not advance			
Batuhan Hakan	Men's 400 metre freestyle	4:06.58	42	—N/a		Did not advance	
Erge Can Gezmiş	Men's 400 metre freestyle	3:58.11	19	—N/a		Did not advance	
Kaan Özcan	Men's 400 metre freestyle	3:56.12	14	—N/a		Did not advance	
Batuhan Hakan	Men's 800 metre freestyle	—N/a				9:05.38	26
Berk Özkul	Men's 50 metre butterfly	25.03	14	Did not advance			
Emre Sakçı	Men's 50 metre butterfly	24.64	24	Did not advance			
Samet Alkan	Men's 50 metre butterfly	26.03	53	Did not advance			
Berk Özkul	Men's 100 metre butterfly	55.71	19	Did not advance			
Erge Can Gezmiş	Men's 100 metre butterfly	55.47	16 Q	Withdrew			
Samet Alkan	Men's 100 metre butterfly	56.78	39	Did not advance			
Erge Can Gezmiş	Men's 200 metre butterfly	2:08.03	29	Did not advance			
Kaan Özcan	Men's 200 metre butterfly	2:01.16	6 Q	2:01.39	11	Did not advance	
Emre Sakçı	Men's 50 metre breaststroke	28.11	3 Q	28.46	4 q	28.25	4
Berk Özkul	Men's 50 metre backstroke	27.12	25	Did not advance			
Rasim Ogulcan Gör	Men's 50 metre backstroke	27.47	29	Did not advance			
Berk Özkul	Men's 100 metre backstroke	57.91	29	Did not advance			
Rasim Ogulcan Gör	Men's 100 metre backstroke	58.66	36	Did not advance			
Berk Özkul	Men's 200 metre backstroke	2:07.08	26	Did not advance			
Rasim Ogulcan Gör	Men's 200 metre backstroke	2:09.78	32	Did not advance			
Batuhan Hakan	Men's 200 metre individual medley	2:06.61	19	Did not advance			
Samet Alkan	Men's 200 metre individual medley	2:07.44	25	Did not advance			
Batuhan Hakan	Men's 400 metre individual medley	4.28.54	14	—N/a		Did not advance	
Erge Can Gezmiş	Men's 400 metre individual medley	4:27.64	12	—N/a		Did not advance	
Samet Alkan	Men's 400 metre individual medley	4:29.33	17	—N/a		Did not advance	
Batuhan Hakan; Erge Can Gezmiş; Kaan Özcan; Samet Alkan	Men's 4 × 100 metre freestyle relay	3:29.10	11	—N/a		Did not advance	
Batuhan Hakan; Erge Can Gezmiş; Kaan Özcan; Samet Alkan	Men's 4 × 200 metre freestyle relay	7:35.13	8 Q	—N/a		7:31.55	8
	Men's 4 × 100 metre medley relay	3:52.88	14	—N/a		Did not advance	

Athlete	Event	Heat		Semifinals		Final	
Athlete	Event	Time	Rank	Time	Rank	Time	Rank
Almina Simla Ertan	Women's 50 metre freestyle	26.60	10 Q	26.51	5	Did not advance	
Sezin Eligül	Women's 50 metre freestyle	27.21	30	Did not advance			
Almina Simla Ertan	Women's 100 metre freestyle	1:00.39	57	Did not advance			
Sezin Eligül	Women's 100 metre freestyle	58.74	31	Did not advance			
Zeynep Odabaşı	Women's 100 metre freestyle	58.52	25	Did not advance			
Zeynep Odabaşı	Women's 200 metre freestyle	2:08.55	38	Did not advance			
Zeynep Odabaşı	Women's 400 metre freestyle	4:34.91	39	—N/a		Did not advance	
Almina Simla Ertan	Women's 50 metre butterfly	28.94	33	Did not advance			
Sezin Eligül	Women's 50 metre butterfly	28.03	11 Q	27.95	6	Did not advance	
Yüksel Deniz Özkan	Women's 50 metre butterfly	28.38	23	Did not advance			
Sezin Eligül	Women's 100 metre butterfly	1:04.12	29	Did not advance			
Yüksel Deniz Özkan	Women's 100 metre butterfly	1:03.59	24	Did not advance			
Yüksel Deniz Özkan	Women's 200 metre butterfly	2:22.95	20	Did not advance			
Gülsen Beste Samancı	Women's 50 metre breaststroke	32.10	2 Q	31.98	3 Q	32.14	4
Gülsen Beste Samancı	Women's 100 metre breaststroke	1:11.33	6 Q	1:10.80	qSO	1:12.34	8
Sezin Eligül	Women's 50 metre backstroke	30.34	22	Did not advance			
Yüksel Deniz Özkan	Women's 200 metre individual medley	2:28.68	33	Did not advance			
Almina Simla Ertan; Sezin Eligül; Yüksel Deniz Özkan; Zeynep Odabaşı	Women's 4 × 100 metre freestyle relay	3:57.23	9	—N/a		Did not advance	
	Women's 4 × 200 metre freestyle relay	Did not start		—N/a		Did not advance	
Sezin Eligül; Gülsen Beste Samancı; Yüksel Deniz Özkan; Zeynep Odabaşı	Women's 4 × 100 metre medley relay	4:17.21	5 Q	—N/a		4:17.29	8
Erge Can Gezmiş; Kaan Özcan; Sezin Eligül; Zeynep Odabaşı	Mixed 4 × 100 metre freestyle relay	3:40.70	8 Q	—N/a		3:38.74	7
Berk Özkul; Gülsen Beste Samancı; Yüksel Deniz Özkan; Hüseyin Emre Sakçı	Mixed 4 × 100 metre medley relay	4:03.65	6 Q	—N/a		4:03.62	6

== Synchronised swimming ==
Athlete	Event	Qualification Free Routine				Final			
Athlete	Event	Points	Figures	Total	Rank	Points	Figures	Total	Rank
Defne Bakırcı	Solo	75.7667	71.0182	146.7849	12 Q	76.3667	71.0182	147.3849	12
Defne Bakırcı; Misra Gündeş	Duet	75.2333	69.5864	144.8197	11 Q	76.3667	69.5864	145.9531	11
Defne Bakırcı; Öykü Evliya; Mısra Gündeş; Dilay Horasan; Rezzan Eda Tuncay; Ebru Mina Turhan; Selin Ünser; Hande Yıldız; Nurberat Gökmen^{Res} Öykü Halis^{Res}	Team	74.8333	67.3818	142.2151	11 Q	74.9667	67.3818	142.3485	11
Defne Bakırcı; Öykü Evliya; Nurberat Gökmen; Mısra Gündeş; Öykü Halis; Dilay Horasan; Rezzan Eda Tuncay; Ebru Mina Turhan; Selin Ünser; Hande Yıldız	Free combination	74.8000	—N/a	74.8000	11 Q	75.6667	—N/a	75.6667	11

== Table tennis ==
Athlete	Event	Round of 64	Round of 32	Round of 16	Quarterfinal	Semifinal	Final / BM	
Athlete	Event	Opposition Score	Opposition Score	Opposition Score	Opposition Score	Opposition Score	Opposition Score	Rank
Ahmet Li	Men's singles	(Slovakia) Pistej (SVK); L 0–4	Did not advance					
Melek Hu	Women's singles	BYE	(France) Grundisch (FRA); W 4–1	(Ukraine) Bilenko (UKR); W 4–1	(Poland) Li (POL); W 4–3	(Netherlands) Li (NED); L 2–4	(Slovakia) Odorova (SVK); W 4–1	3rd place, bronze medalist(s)

== Taekwondo ==
Men's

Athlete	Event	Round of 16	Quarterfinals	Semifinals	Repechage	Bronze medal	Final	
Athlete	Event	Opposition Result	Opposition Result	Opposition Result	Opposition Result	Opposition Result	Opposition Result	Rank
Görkem Sezer	Men's 58 kg	(Portugal) Braganca (POR); L 0–12	Did not advance		(Serbia) Gladovic (SRB); L 8–9	Did not advance		
Servet Tazegül	Men's 68 kg	(Poland) Robak (POL); L 9–21	Did not advance		(Portugal) Silva (POR); W 12–6	(Russia) Denisenko (RUS); L 16–19	Did not advance	
Yunus Sarı	Men's 80 kg	(Armenia) Yeremyan (ARM); L 2–4	Did not advance					
Ali Sarı	Men's 80+ kg	(Netherlands) Wanrooij (NED); L 9–10	Did not advance					

Women's

Athlete	Event	Round of 16	Quarterfinals	Semifinals	Repechage	Bronze medal	Final	
Athlete	Event	Opposition Result	Opposition Result	Opposition Result	Opposition Result	Opposition Result	Opposition Result	Rank
Rukiye Yıldırım	Women's 49 kg	(Hungary) Gonda (HUN); L 7–11	Did not advance					
Hatice Kübra Yangın	Women's 57 kg	(Finland) Mikkonen (FIN); W 7–4	(Spain) Calvo (ESP); L 7–11	Did not advance				
Nur Tatar	Women's 67 kg	(Serbia) Bajić (SRB); W 5–3	(Azerbaijan) Azizova (AZE); L 2–6	Did not advance	(Netherlands) van Baaren (NED); W 3–0	(France) Niare (FRA); W 8–7	Did not advance	3rd place, bronze medalist(s)
Furkan Asena Aydın	Women's 67+ kg	(United Kingdom) Walkden (GBR); L 6–9	Did not advance					

== Triathlon ==
Athlete	Event	Time	Rank
Jonas Schomburg	Men's	1:49:34	6
Ece Bakıcı	Women's	DNF	
İpek Öztosun	Women's	LAP	

== Volleyball ==
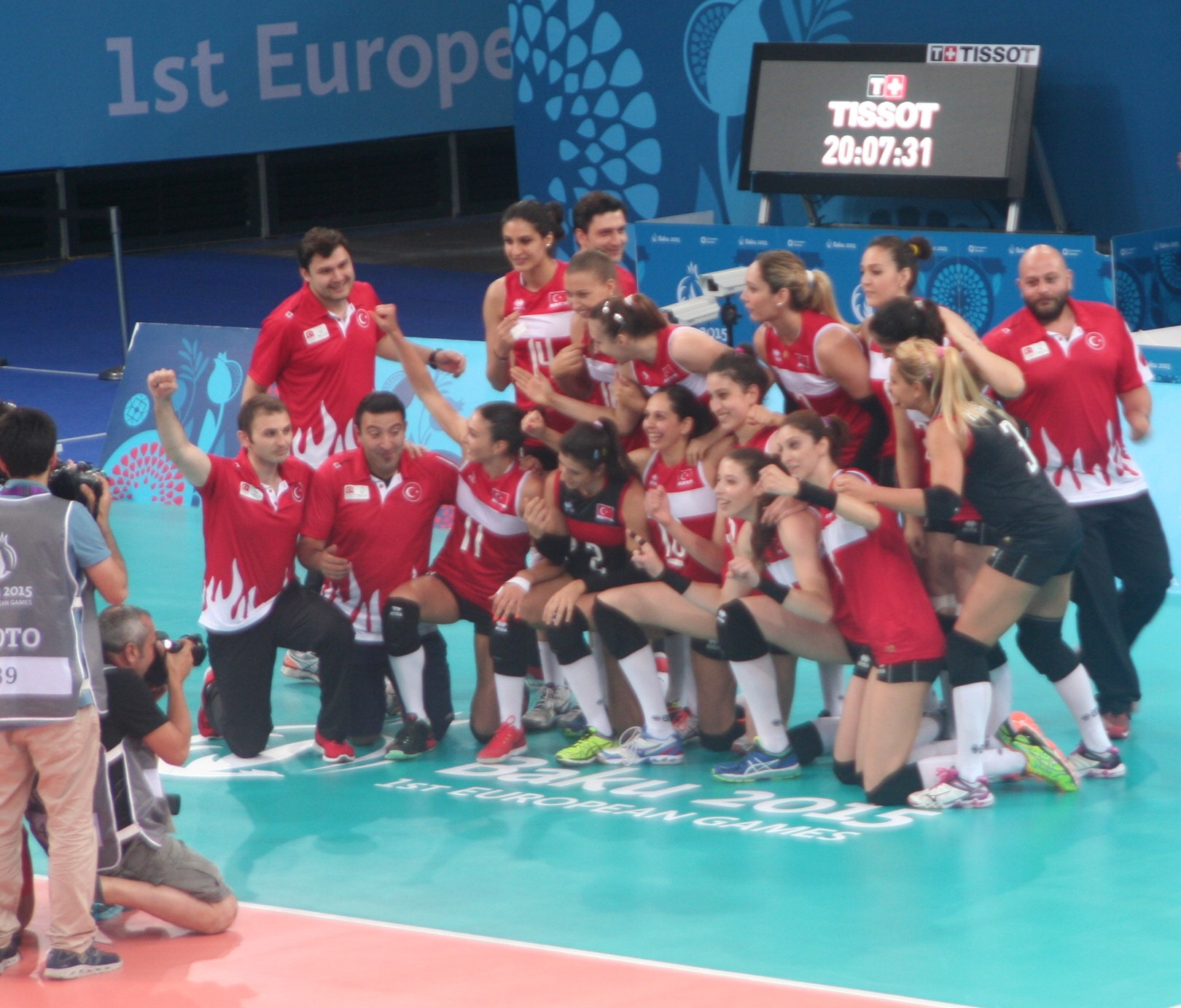
Turkey women's volleyball team celebrating the winning of the games

=== Indoor volleyball ===
- Men's team – 1 team of 14 athletes
- Women's team – 1 team of 14 athletes

Turkish women became champions beating the Polish team 3–0 at the final.

=== Beach volleyball ===
Athlete	Event	Preliminary round				Round of 32	Round of 16	Quarterfinals	Semifinals	Final / BM
Athlete	Event	Opposition Score	Opposition Score	Opposition Score	Rank	Opposition Score	Opposition Score	Opposition Score	Opposition Score	Rank
Engin Özbek; Hakan Göğtepe	Men's	(Russia) Barsuk / Koshkarev (RUS); L 10–21, 13–21	(France) Salvetti / Daguerre (FRA); L 18–21, 18–21	(Denmark) Kildegaard / Abell (DEN); L 17–21, 12–21	4	Did not advance				
Hasan Mermer; Selçuk Şekerci	Men's	(Israel) Faiga / Hilman (ISR); L 18–21, 20–22	(Czech Republic) Kubala / Hadrava (CZE); L 15–21, 13–21	(Netherlands) van de Velde / van Dorsten (NED); W 15–21, 21–17, 15–13	3 Q	(Belarus) Kavalenka / Dziadkou (BLR); L 16–21, 17–21	Did not advance			

== Water Polo ==
- Men's team – 1 team of 13 athletes

== Wrestling ==
Men's freestyle

Athlete	Event	Round of 32	Round of 16	Quarterfinal	Semifinal	Repechage	Final / BM	
Athlete	Event	Opposition Result	Opposition Result	Opposition Result	Opposition Result	Opposition Result	Opposition Result	Rank
Sezar Akgül	57 kg	Bye	Baskakov (EST); W 6-0	Lebedev (RUS); L 3-6	Did not advance	Markovych (UKR); W 7-7	Aliyev (AZE); W 8-3	3rd place, bronze medalist(s)
Münir Recep Aktaş	61 kg	—N/a	Maksimau (BLR); W 7-3	Bogomoev (RUS); L 0-4	Did not advance	—N/a	Aliyev (AZE); L 2-10	5
Mustafa Kaya	65 kg	Bye	Curri (KOS); W 12-1	Chamizo (ITA); L 7-10	Did not advance	Kentchadze (GEO); W 14-13	Bucur (ROU); W 10-0	3rd place, bronze medalist(s)
Yakup Gör	70 kg	Bye	Olle (SVK); W 10-0	Costa (ITA); W 10-0	Gazimagomedov (RUS); L 0-6	—N/a	Efendiev (SRB); W 17-6	3rd place, bronze medalist(s)
Soner Demirtaş	74 kg	Bye	Selenius (FIN); W 10-0	Hasanov (AZE); W 5-3	Terziev (BUL); W 6-3	—N/a	Geduev (RUS); L 0-10	2nd place, silver medalist(s)
Ahmet Bilici	86 kg	Murtazaliev (ARM); L 4-5	Did not advance					15
İbrahim Bölükbaşı	97 kg	Bye	Stoychev (BUL); W 7-1	Andriitsev (UKR); L 1-5	Did not advance			9
Taha Akgül	125 kg	Bye	Magomedov (AZE); W 5-2	Baran (POL); W 5-0	Gagloev (SVK); W 6-0	—N/a	Shemarov (BLR); W 6-0	1st place, gold medalist(s)

Men's Greco-Roman

Athlete	Event	Round of 32	Round of 16	Quarterfinal	Semifinal	Repechage	Final / BM	
Athlete	Event	Opposition Result	Opposition Result	Opposition Result	Opposition Result	Opposition Result	Opposition Result	Rank
Fatih Üçüncü	59 kg	Lizatovic (CRO); W 9-0	Munteanu (ROU); L 1-3	Did not advance				10
Abdulsamet Uğurli	66 kg	Passos (POR); W 6-2	Maksimović (SRB); L 4-4	Did not advance				10
Yunus Özel	71 kg	Liakh (BLR); L 2-13	Did not advance					13
Emrah Kuş	75 kg	Kolcovs (LAT); W 12-2	Datunashvili (GEO); L 10-12	Did not advance				12
Selçuk Çebi	80 kg	Bye	Bestenis (LAT); W 8-0	Jersgren (SWE); W 4-0	Huseynov (AZE); L 0-9	—N/a	Aleksandrov (BUL); L 2-3	5
Metehan Başar	85 kg	Sopadze (GEO); W 5-2	Tjoerstad (NOR); W 2-0	Beleniuk (UKR); L 1-3	Did not advance	Tamas (ROU); W 2-1	Manukyan (ARM); W 3-0	3rd place, bronze medalist(s)
Cenk İldem	98 kg	Avanesyan (ISR); W 2-0	Lahti (FIN); W 5-4	Timoncini (ITA); W 2-0	Magomedov (RUS); L 2-6	—N/a	Nuriyev (AZE); W 3-0	3rd place, bronze medalist(s)
Rıza Kayaalp	130 kg	—N/a	Lám (HUN); W 2-0	Semenov (RUS); W 3-0	Nabi (EST); W 7-0	—N/a	Shariati (AZE); W 3-1	1st place, gold medalist(s)

Women's freestyle

Athlete	Event	Round of 16	Quarterfinal	Semifinal	Repechage	Final / BM	
Athlete	Event	Opposition Result	Opposition Result	Opposition Result	Opposition Result	Opposition Result	Rank
Evin Demirhan	48 kg	Matejova (SVK); W 5-4	Islamova (RUS); L 0-10	Did not advance			7
Merve Kenger	53 kg	Dorogan (AZE); L 2-8	—N/a		Denes (HUN); W 4-0	Budu (MDA); W 4-6	3rd place, bronze medalist(s)
Bediha Gün	55 kg	Sánchez (ESP); W 6-4	Synyshyn (AZE); L 0-12	Did not advance			7
Elif Jale Yeşilırmak	58 kg	Bye	Basse (FRA); W 6-0	Lavrenchuk (UKR); L 4-3	—N/a	Huchok (BLR); W 6-5	3rd place, bronze medalist(s)
Hafize Şahin	60 kg	Mattsson (SWE); L 1-2	Did not advance				10
Buse Tosun	63 kg	Mamashuk (BLR); L 6-8	Did not advance				10
Burcu Örskaya	69 kg	Focken (GER); L 0-8	Did not advance				15
Yasemin Adar	75 kg	Zlateva (BUL); W 6-1	Vashchuk (UKR); W 4-0	Bukina (RUS); L 11-14	—N/a	Saenko (MDA); L 3-10	5
