= Gymnastics at the 2015 European Games – Men's floor exercise =

Men's floor exercise at the 2015 European Games
- Venue: National Gymnastics Arena
- Date: 20 June
- Competitors: 6 from 6 nations
- Winning score: 15.333

Medalists
gold medal	Rayderley Zapata	Spain
silver medal	Fabian Hambüchen	Germany
bronze medal	David Belyavskiy	Russia

The men's artistic gymnastics floor exercise competition at the 2015 European Games was held at the National Gymnastics Arena, Baku on 20 June 2015.

== Qualification ==
The top six gymnasts with one per country advanced to the final.

Rank	Gymnast	D Score	E Score	Pen.	Total	Qual.
1	Rayderley Zapata (ESP)	6.700	8.600		15.300	Q
2	Alexander Shatilov (ISR)	6.600	8.666	−0.100	15.166	Q
3	David Belyavskiy (RUS)	6.600	8.600	−0.100	15.100	Q
4	Oleg Verniaiev (UKR)	6.700	8.400		15.100	Q
5	Kieran Behan (IRL)	6.300	8.766		15.066	Q
6	Fabian Hambüchen (GER)	6.400	8.633		15.033	Q
7	Dzmitry Barkalau (BLR)	6.100	8.900		15.000	R1
8	Marco Rizzo (SUI)	6.200	8.800		15.000	R2
9	Frank Baines (GBR)	6.300	8.600		14.900	R3

== Final ==
Oldest and youngest competitors

	Name	Country	Date of birth	Age
Youngest	Oleg Verniaiev	Ukraine	September 29, 1993	21 years, 8 months and 22 days
Oldest	Alexander Shatilov	Israel	March 22, 1987	28 years, 2 months and 29 days

Rank	Gymnast	D Score	E Score	Pen.	Total
1st place, gold medalist(s)	Rayderley Zapata (ESP)	6.700	8.633		15.333
2nd place, silver medalist(s)	Fabian Hambüchen (GER)	6.400	8.700		15.100
3rd place, bronze medalist(s)	David Belyavskiy (RUS)	6.600	8.400		15.000
4	Kieran Behan (IRL)	6.300	8.566		14.866
5	Alexander Shatilov (ISR)	6.000	8.833		14.833
6	Oleg Verniaiev (UKR)	6.700	7.933	−0.400	14.233
