= Gymnastics at the 2015 European Games – Men's artistic individual all-around =

International sporting competition

Men's artistic individual all-around at the 2015 European Games
- Venue: National Gymnastics Arena
- Date: 18 June
- Competitors: 18 from 18 nations
- Winning score: 90.332

Medalists
gold medal	Oleg Verniaiev	Ukraine
silver medal	Oleg Stepko	Azerbaijan
bronze medal	Nikita Ignatyev	Russia

The men's artistic gymnastics individual all-around competition at the 2015 European Games was held at the National Gymnastics Arena, Baku on 18 June 2015.

== Qualification ==
The top 18 gymnasts with one per country qualified for the all-around final.

== Results ==
Oldest and youngest competitors

	Name	Country	Date of birth	Age
Youngest	Brinn Bevan	Great Britain	June 16, 1997	18 years and 2 days
Oldest	Dzmitry Barkalau	Belarus	February 23, 1986	29 years, 3 months and 26 days

Rank	Gymnast	Floor (gymnastics)	Pommel horse	Rings (gymnastics)	Vault (gymnastics)	Parallel bars	Horizontal bar	Total
1st place, gold medalist(s)	Oleg Verniaiev (UKR)	14.533	15.900	14.900	15.300	14.933	14.766	90.332
2nd place, silver medalist(s)	Oleg Stepko (AZE)	14.600	15.300	14.633	14.766	15.866	13.900	89.065
3rd place, bronze medalist(s)	Nikita Ignatyev (RUS)	14.900	14.300	15.033	14.966	15.266	12.900	87.365
4	Dzmitry Barkalau (BLR)	14.800	14.533	14.533	14.500	14.300	14.300	86.966
5	Fabian Hambuechen (GER)	14.666	13.666	14.366	13.300	14.133	15.500	85.631
6	Néstor Abad (ESP)	14.366	13.900	13.166	14.900	15.000	14.266	85.598
7	Alexander Shatilov (ISR)	14.166	14.300	13.533	14.133	13.933	14.566	84.631
8	Rokas Guščinas (LTU)	14.100	14.733	14.100	13.833	14.200	13.433	84.399
9	Taha Serhani (SUI)	14.533	13.566	13.433	14.233	14.333	14.000	84.098
10	Axel Augis (FRA)	13.700	12.700	13.866	14.766	14.166	14.600	83.798
11	Ferhat Arıcan (TUR)	14.300	12.833	12.900	14.666	15.033	13.400	83.132
12	Stian Skjerahaug (NOR)	14.400	14.033	12.966	14.366	13.700	13.366	82.831
13	Casimir Schmidt (NED)	14.733	13.933	13.433	13.833	14.333	12.200	82.465
14	Brinn Bevan (GBR)	14.800	13.800	12.433	14.833	14.733	11.700	82.299
15	Tommaso De Vecchis (ITA)	14.166	13.333	13.800	12.933	14.100	13.933	82.265
16	Jimmy Verbaeys (BEL)	14.300	13.800	12.200	12.866	14.633	13.866	81.665
17	Kieran Behan (IRL)	15.133	11.433	14.100	14.366	12.900	13.266	81.198
18	Vlad Cotuna (ROU)	14.066	13.200	13.933	14.033	13.433	12.333	80.998
