= Gymnastics at the 2015 European Games – Men's pommel horse =

Men's pommel horse at the 2015 European Games
- Venue: National Gymnastics Arena
- Date: 20 June
- Competitors: 6 from 6 nations
- Winning score: 14.966

Medalists
gold medal	Sašo Bertoncelj	Slovenia
silver medal	Oleg Stepko	Azerbaijan
bronze medal	Brinn Bevan	Great Britain

The men's artistic gymnastics pommel horse competition at the 2015 European Games was held at the National Gymnastics Arena on 20 June 2015.

== Qualification ==
The top six gymnasts with one per country advanced to the final.

Rank	Gymnast	D Score	E Score	Pen.	Total	Qual.
1	Oleg Stepko (AZE)	6.700	8.633		15.333	Q
2	Sašo Bertoncelj (SLO)	6.500	8.666		15.166	Q
3	David Belyavskiy (RUS)	6.300	8.500		14.800	Q
4	Brinn Bevan (GBR)	6.400	8.366		14.766	Q
5	Oleg Verniaiev (UKR)	7.100	7.600		14.700	Q
6	Slavomír Michňák (SVK)	6.300	8.366		14.666	Q
7	Petro Pakhnyuk (AZE)	6.400	8.233		14.633	
8	Axel Augis (FRA)	5.900	8.666		14.566	R1
9	Fabián González (ESP)	6.200	8.300		14.500	R2
10	Nikita Ignatyev (RUS)	6.100	8.266		14.366	
11	Dzmitry Barkalau (BLR)	6.000	8.333		14.333	R3

== Final ==
Rank	Gymnast	D Score	E Score	Pen.	Total
1st place, gold medalist(s)	Sašo Bertoncelj (SLO)	6.500	8.466		14.966
2nd place, silver medalist(s)	Oleg Stepko (AZE)	6.400	8.200		14.600
3rd place, bronze medalist(s)	Brinn Bevan (GBR)	6.300	7.900		14.200
4	David Belyavskiy (RUS)	6.200	7.700		13.900
5	Oleg Verniaiev (UKR)	7.000	6.833		13.833
6	Slavomír Michňák (SVK)	6.200	7.066		13.266
