= Gymnastics at the 2015 European Games – Men's parallel bars =

Men's parallel bars at the 2015 European Games
- Venue: National Gymnastics Arena
- Date: 20 June
- Competitors: 6 from 6 nations
- Winning score: 15.733

Medalists
gold medal	Oleg Stepko	Azerbaijan
silver medal	David Belyavskiy	Russia
bronze medal	Marius Berbecar	Romania

The men's artistic gymnastics parallel bars competition at the 2015 European Games was held at the National Gymnastics Arena on 20 June 2015.

== Qualification ==
The top six gymnasts with one per country advanced to the final.

Rank	Gymnast	D Score	E Score	Pen.	Total	Qual.
1	Oleg Verniaiev (UKR)	6.900	8.766		15.666	Q
2	Marius Berbecar (ROU)	6.700	8.933		15.633	Q
3	David Belyavskiy (RUS)	6.600	9.000		15.600	Q
4	Oleg Stepko (AZE)	6.800	8.766		15.566	Q
5	Ferhat Arıcan (TUR)	6.600	8.766		15.366	Q
6	Petro Pakhnyuk (AZE)	6.800	8.466		15.266	
7	Nikolai Kuksenkov (RUS)	6.600	8.566		15.166	
8	Nikita Ignatyev (RUS)	6.800	8.333		15.133	
9	Axel Augis (FRA)	6.300	8.800		15.100	Q
10	Néstor Abad (ESP)	6.400	8.666		15.066	R1
10	Sebastian Krimmer (GER)	6.400	8.666		15.066	R1
12	Vlad Cotuna (ROU)	6.600	8.466		15.066	
13	Brinn Bevan (GBR)	6.200	8.600		14.800	R3

== Final ==
Rank	Gymnast	D Score	E Score	Pen.	Total
1st place, gold medalist(s)	Oleg Stepko (AZE)	6.800	8.933		15.733
2nd place, silver medalist(s)	David Belyavskiy (RUS)	6.600	9.100		15.700
3rd place, bronze medalist(s)	Marius Berbecar (ROU)	6.700	8.900		15.600
4	Axel Augis (FRA)	6.700	8.300		15.000
5	Oleg Verniaiev (UKR)	6.500	8.133		14.633
6	Ferhat Arıcan (TUR)	6.200	8.100		14.300
