= Erge Gezmis =

Turkish swimmer (born 1998)

Personal information
- Nationality: Turkish
- Born: 17 January 1998 (age 28)

Sport
- Sport: Swimming

Erge Gezmis (born 17 January 1998) is a Turkish swimmer. He competed in the men's 200 metre freestyle event at the 2018 FINA World Swimming Championships (25 m), in Hangzhou, China. In 2019, he competed in two events at the 2019 World Aquatics Championships held in Gwangju, South Korea.
