= Russia at the 2015 European Games =

- IOC code: RUS
- NOC: Russian Olympic Committee
- Website: www.olympic.ru

in Baku, Azerbaijan 12 June 2015 – 28 June 2015
- Competitors: 353 in 22 sports
- Flag bearer: Khadjimurat Gatsalov
- Medals Ranked 1st: Gold 79 Silver 40 Bronze 45 Total 164

European Games appearances (overview)
- 2015; 2019; 2023; 2027

Russian Federation participated at the I European Games, which took place in Baku, Azerbaijan from 12 to 28 June 2015. Russia sent athletes for every sport except athletics, as the level of Russian athletes was too high, according to Russia's Minister of Sports Vitaly Mutko. Russia still had the largest team at the Games, with the athletics programme consisting of only one event. Russia finished in the first place on the medal rankings, winning 79 gold medals.

== Team ==
Russia sent around 620 athletes, coaches, managers, physicians and masseurs. At an executive committee meeting of the Russian Olympic Committee on 21 May, the number of participants was named 367 athletes, 317 of which represent Olympic sports, 40 non-Olympic sports, seven demonstration sports and three Paralympic sports. The final number of athletes was 351 (excluding athletes who competed at the demonstration or Paralympics sports).

Most athletes came from Moscow (97). Also many sportspeople represented the Moscow Oblast (38), St. Petersburg (33), Republic of Tatarstan (17) and Krasnodar Krai (16). Russian athletes competed at all sport types, except athletics, as the level of the Russian team would have been too high, according to Vitaly Mutko. The introduction of the team took place on 3 June 2015 at the sports center Ozero Krugloe. The uniform was made by the Russian company Bosco di Ciliegi.

The flag bearer on the opening ceremony on 12 June 2015 became Olympic Champion, multifold World and European Champion in Wrestling, Khadzhimurat Gatsalov. President of Russia Vladimir Putin attended the opening ceremony. The flag of the European Olympic Committee was held by manifold Gymnastics Champion Elena Zamolodchikova together with seven other people.

The manager of the Russian delegation was Igor Kazikov.

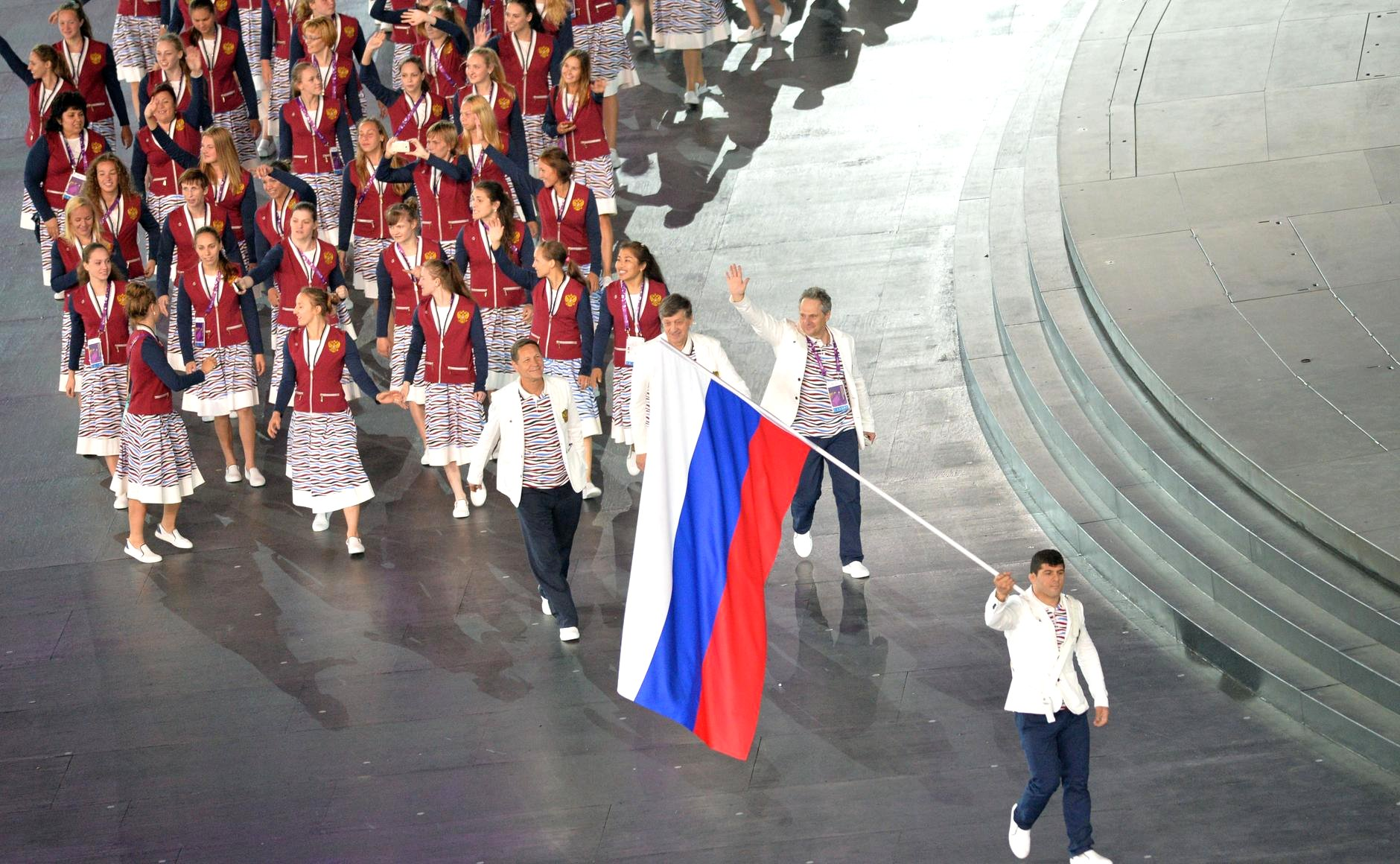
Team Russia at the opening ceremony, 12 June 2015

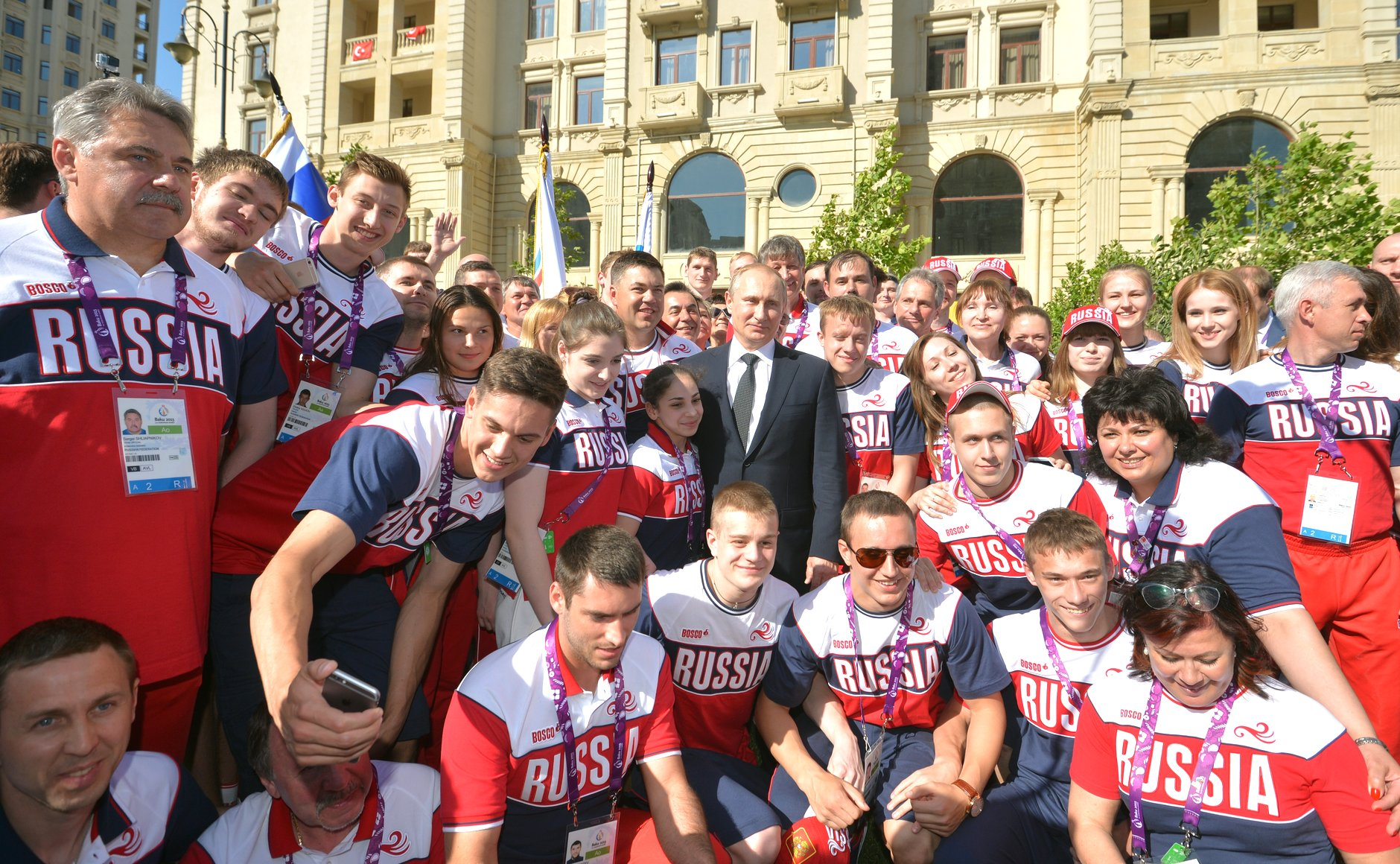
President of Russia Vladimir Putin with the Russian team

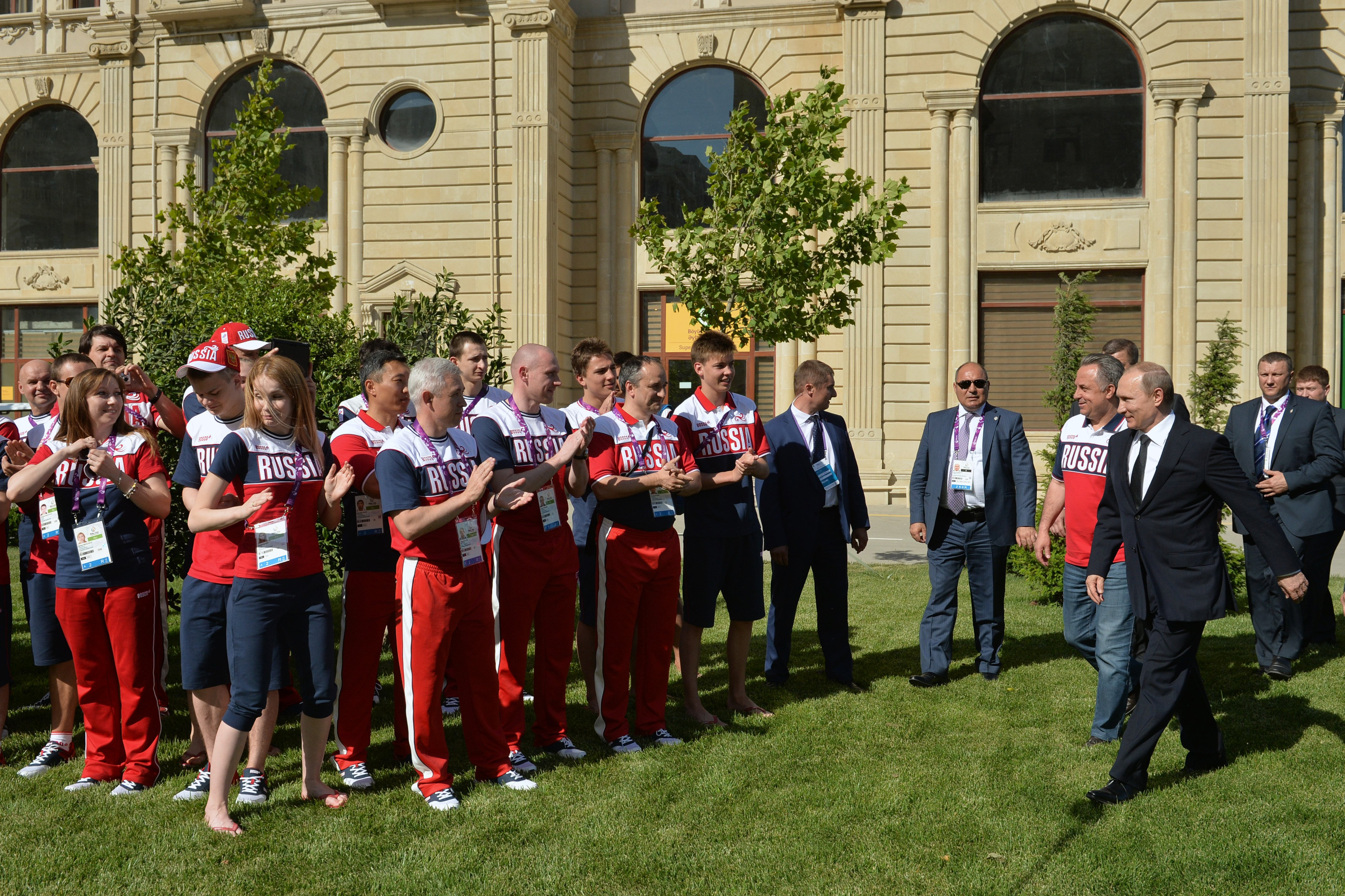
Putin and Minister of Sports Vitaly Mutko meet the Russian team

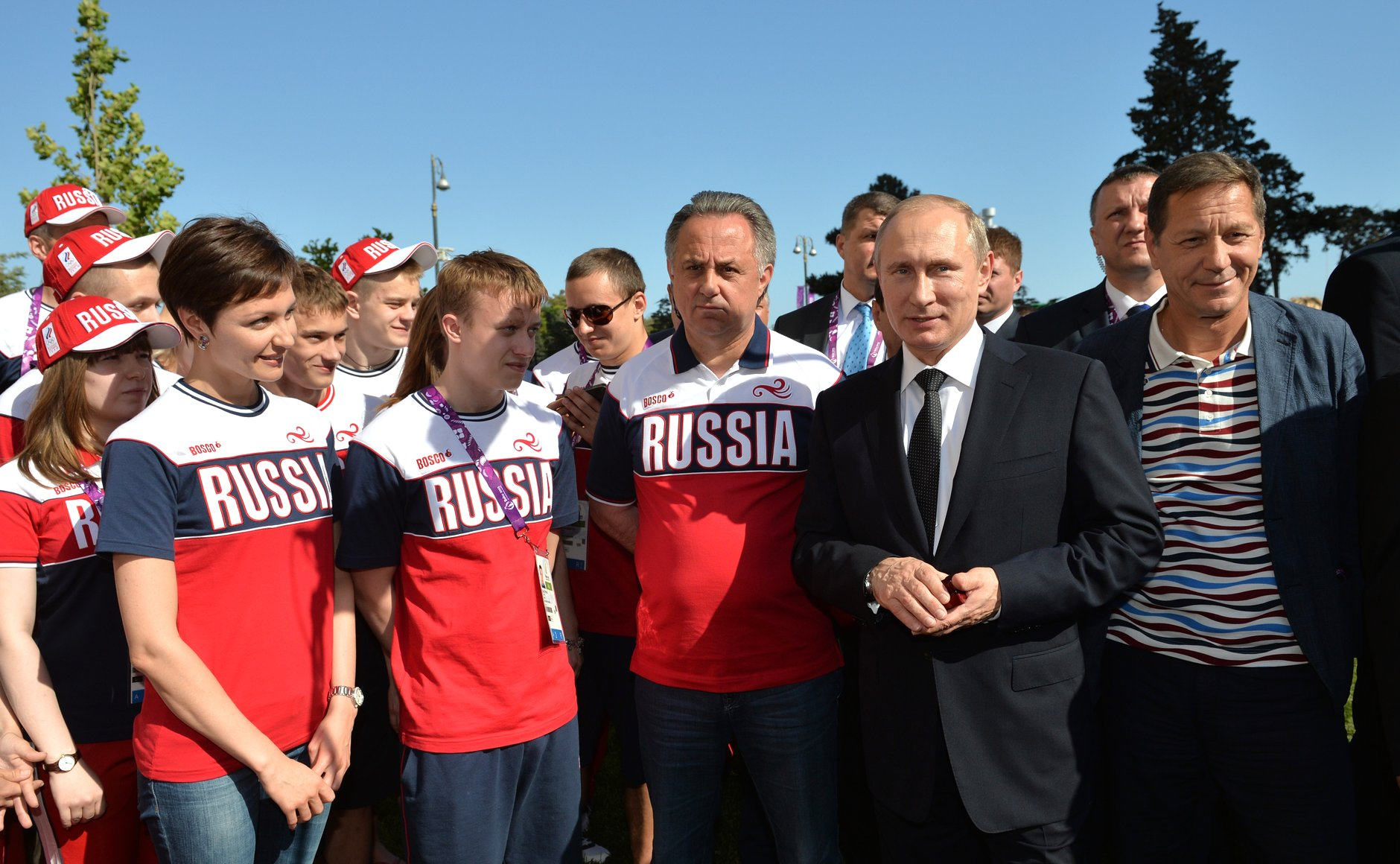
Mutko, Putin, Zhukov (President of the ROC) with the Russian athletes

=== Competitors ===
Sport	Men	Women	Total
Archery	3	3	6
Badminton	4	5	9
Basketball	4	4	8
Beach soccer	12	–	12
Boxing	10	5	15
Canoe sprint	13	6	19
Cycling	9	7	16
Diving	5	5	10
Fencing	12	12	24
Gymnastics	10	18	28
Judo	10	10	20
Karate	1	1	2
Sambo	4	4	8
Shooting	16	12	28
Swimming	24	11	35
Synchronised swimming	–	10	10
Table tennis	3	3	6
Taekwondo	4	4	8
Triathlon	3	3	6
Volleyball	16	17	33
Water polo	13	13	26
Wrestling	16	8	24
Total	192	161	353

== Medalists ==
Medal	Name	Sport	Event	Date
Gold	Stepan Maryanyan	Wrestling	Men's Greco-Roman 59 kg	13 June
Gold	Evgeny Saleev	Wrestling	Men's Greco-Roman 80 kg	13 June
Gold	Islam Magomedov	Wrestling	Men's Greco-Roman 98 kg	13 June
Gold	Artem Surkov	Wrestling	Men's Greco-Roman 66 kg	14 June
Gold	Davit Chakvetadze	Wrestling	Men's Greco-Roman 85 kg	14 June
Gold	David Belyavskiy; Nikita Ignatyev; Nikolai Kuksenkov	Gymnastics	Men's artistic team all-around	15 June
Gold	Victoria Komova; Aliya Mustafina; Seda Tutkhalyan	Gymnastics	Women's artistic team all-around	15 June
Gold	Valeriya Filenkova; Daria Kulagina	Synchronised swimming	Women's duet	15 June
Gold	Valeriya Filenkova; Mayya Gurbanberdieva; Veronika Kalinina; Daria Kulagina; Anna Larkina; Anisiya Neborako; Mariia Nemchinova; Maria Salmina; Anastasiia Arkhipovskaia^{Res} Elizaveta Ovchinnikova^{Res}	Synchronised swimming	Team	15 June
Gold	Valeriya Filenkova; Mayya Gurbanberdieva; Veronika Kalinina; Daria Kulagina; Anna Larkina; Anisiya Neborako; Mariia Nemchinova; Maria Salmina; Anastasiia Arkhipovskaia; Elizaveta Ovchinnikova	Synchronised swimming	Women's free combination	16 June
Gold	Anisiya Neborako	Synchronised swimming	Women's solo	16 June
Gold	Valeria Lazinskaya	Wrestling	Women's freestyle 63 kg	16 June
Gold	Diana Borisova; Daria Kleshcheva; Anastasia Maksimova; Anastasiia Tatareva; Maria Tolkacheva; Sofya Skomorokh	Gymnastics	Women's group all-around	17 June
Gold	Alexey Alipov	Shooting	Men's trap	17 June
Gold	Viktor Lebedev	Wrestling	Men's freestyle 57 kg	17 June
Gold	Aniuar Geduev	Wrestling	Men's freestyle 74 kg	17 June
Gold	Nikita Shleikher	Diving	Men's 1 metre springboard	18 June
Gold	Aliya Mustafina	Gymnastics	Women's artistic individual all-around	18 June
Gold	Anastasia Baryshnikova	Taekwondo	Women's 67 kg	18 June
Gold	Aleksandr Bogomoev	Wrestling	Men's freestyle 61 kg	18 June
Gold	Magomedrasul Gazimagomedov	Wrestling	Men's freestyle 70 kg	18 June
Gold	Abdulrashid Sadulaev	Wrestling	Men's freestyle 86 kg	18 June
Gold	Ilia Molchanov; Nikita Nikolaev	Diving	Men's 3 metre synchronized springboard	19 June
Gold	Maria Polyakova	Diving	Women's 1 metre springboard	19 June
Gold	Marina Chernova; Georgy Pataraya	Gymnastics	Mixed acrobatics pairs all-around	19 June
Gold	Yana Kudryavtseva	Gymnastics	Women's rhythmic individual all-around	19 June
Gold	Vitaly Fokeev	Shooting	Men's double trap	19 June
Gold	Aliya Mustafina	Gymnastics	Women's uneven bars	20 June
Gold	Russia women's national water polo team: Maria Bersneva; Anastasia Fedotova; Daria Gerzanich; Evgenia Golovina; Anna Isakova; Polina Kempf; Bella Khamzaeva(С); Elena Kotanchyan; Alena Serzhantova; Svetlana Stepakhina; Veronika Vakhitova; Elizaveta Zaplatina; Aleksandra Zelenkovskaia	Water polo	Women's tournament	20 June
Gold	Marina Chernova; Georgy Pataraya	Gymnastics	Mixed acrobatics pairs balance	21 June
Gold	Marina Chernova; Georgy Pataraya	Gymnastics	Mixed acrobatics pairs dynamic	21 June
Gold	Diana Borisova; Daria Kleshcheva; Anastasia Maksimova; Anastasiia Tatareva; Maria Tolkacheva; Sofya Skomorokh	Gymnastics	Women's group ribbons	21 June
Gold	Yana Kudryavtseva	Gymnastics	Women's rhythmic individual ball	21 June
Gold	Yana Kudryavtseva	Gymnastics	Women's rhythmic individual clubs	21 June
Gold	Margarita Mamun	Gymnastics	Women's rhythmic individual hoop	21 June
Gold	Yana Kudryavtseva	Gymnastics	Women's rhythmic individual ribbon	21 June
Gold	Dmitry Ushakov	Gymnastics	Men's trampoline individual	21 June
Gold	Dmitry Ushakov; Mikhail Melnik	Gymnastics	Men's trampoline synchronized	21 June
Gold	Yana Pavlova	Gymnastics	Women's trampoline individual	21 June
Gold	Yana Pavlova; Anna Kornetskaya	Gymnastics	Women's trampoline synchronized	21 June
Gold	Aymergen Atkunov	Sambo	Men's 57 kg	22 June
Gold	Alsim Chernoskulov	Sambo	Men's 90 kg	22 June
Gold	Artem Osipenko	Sambo	Men's +100 kg	22 June
Gold	Anna Kharitonova	Sambo	Women's 52 kg	22 June
Gold	Yana Kostenko	Sambo	Women's 60 kg	22 June
Gold	Arina Openysheva; Vasilissa Buinaia; Olesia Cherniatina; Mariia Kameneva	Swimming	Women's 4 × 100 metre freestyle relay	23 June
Gold	Maria Astashkina	Swimming	Women's 50 metre breaststroke	23 June
Gold	Anton Chupkov	Swimming	Men's 200 metre breaststroke	24 June
Gold	Vladislav Kozlov; Elisei Stepanov; Mariia Kameneva; Arina Openysheva	Swimming	Mixed 4 × 100 metre freestyle relay	24 June
Gold	Polina Egorova	Swimming	Women's 200 metre backstroke	24 June
Gold	Arina Openysheva	Swimming	Women's 400 metre freestyle	24 June
Gold	Bator Sagaluev	Boxing	Men's 49 kg	25 June
Gold	Bakhtovar Nazirov	Boxing	Men's 56 kg	25 June
Gold	Beslan Mudranov	Judo	Men's 60 kg	25 June
Gold	Kamal Khan-Magomedov	Judo	Men's 66 kg	25 June
Gold	Daniil Pakhomov	Swimming	Men's 200 metre butterfly	25 June
Gold	Aleksandr Prokofev; Nikolay Snegirev; Ernest Maksumov; Elisei Stepanov	Swimming	Men's 4 × 200 metre freestyle relay	25 June
Gold	Maria Astashkina	Swimming	Women's 200 metre breaststroke	25 June
Gold	Maria Kameneva; Maria Astashkina; Polina Egorova; Arina Openysheva	Swimming	Women's 4 × 100 metre medley relay	25 June
Gold	Ilia Aleksandrov; Andrey Kanygin; Leopold Lagutin; Alexsandr Pavlov	Basketball (3x3)	Men's tournament	26 June
Gold	Mariia Cherepanova; Anna Leshkovtseva; Tatiana Petrushina; Tatiana Vidmer	Basketball (3x3)	Women's tournament	26 June
Gold	Elena Savelyeva	Boxing	Women's 54 kg	26 June
Gold	Anastasiia Beliakova	Boxing	Women's 64 kg	26 June
Gold	Yana Alborova; Anastasia Ivanova; Diana Yakovlevna; Adelina Zagidullina	Fencing	Women's team foil	26 June
Gold	Filip Shopin	Swimming	Men's 50 metre backstroke	26 June
Gold	Maria Kameneva; Anton Chupkov; Daniil Pakhomov; Arina Openysheva	Swimming	Mixed 4 × 100 metre medley relay	26 June
Gold	Maria Kameneva	Swimming	Women's 50 metre freestyle	26 June
Gold	Polina Egorova	Swimming	Women's 100 metre butterfly	26 June
Gold	Arina Openysheva	Swimming	Women's 200 metre freestyle	26 June
Gold	Kirill Denisov	Judo	Men's 90 kg	27 June
Gold	Anton Chupkov	Swimming	Men's 100 metre breaststroke	27 June
Gold	Daniil Pakhomov	Swimming	Men's 100 metre butterfly	27 June
Gold	Nikolay Sokolov	Swimming	Men's 400 metre individual medley	27 June
Gold	Filipp Shopin; Anton Chupkov; Daniil Pakhomov; Vladislav Kozlov	Swimming	Men's 4 × 100 metre medley relay	27 June
Gold	Polina Egorova	Swimming	Women's 50 metre butterfly	27 June
Gold	Polina Egorova	Swimming	Women's 100 metre backstroke	27 June
Gold	Maria Astashkina	Swimming	Women's 100 metre breaststroke	27 June
Gold	Anastasiia Kirpichnikova; Arina Openysheva; Olesia Cherniatina; Irina Krivonogova	Swimming	Women's 4 × 200 metre freestyle relay	27 June
Gold	Russia national beach soccer team: Andrey Bukhlitskiy; Yury Gorchinskiy; Yury Krasheninnikov; Ilia Leonov (C); Alexey Makarov; Ivan Ostrovskii; Artur Paporotnyi; Anatoly Peremitin; Kirill Romanov; Egor Shaikov; Dmitrii Shishin; Anton Shkarin	Beach soccer	Men's Beach Soccer	28 June
Silver	Alexey Korovashkov; Ilya Pervukhin	Canoe sprint	Men's C2-1000m	15 June
Silver	Svetlana Lipatova	Wrestling	Women's freestyle 60 kg	15 June
Silver	Vladislav Blintcov; Vasily Pogreban; Anton Ryakhov; Aleksandr Sergeev	Canoe sprint	Men's K4-1000m	16 June
Silver	Natalia Podolskaya	Canoe sprint	Women's K1-200m	16 June
Silver	Ekaterina Bukina	Wrestling	Women's freestyle 75 kg	16 June
Silver	Ilia Molchanov	Diving	Men's 1 metre springboard	18 June
Silver	Anna Chuinyshena	Diving	Women's 10 metre platform	18 June
Silver	Alexey Alipov; Elena Tkach	Shooting	Mixed Trap	18 June
Silver	Albert Gaun	Taekwondo	Men's 80 kg	18 June
Silver	Valeriia Belkina; Yulia Nikitina; Zhanna Parkhometc	Gymnastics	Women's acrobatics groups all-around	19 June
Silver	Margarita Mamun	Gymnastics	Women's rhythmic individual all-around	19 June
Silver	Vladislav Larin	Taekwondo	Men's +80 kg	19 June
Silver	Elena Chernykh; Maria Polyakova	Diving	Women's 3 metre synchronized springboard	20 June
Silver	David Belyavskiy	Gymnastics	Men's parallel bars	20 June
Silver	Nikita Ignatyev	Gymnastics	Men's rings	20 June
Silver	Aliya Mustafina	Gymnastics	Women's floor exercise	20 June
Silver	Seda Tutkhalyan	Gymnastics	Women's vault	20 June
Silver	Dmitri Barsouk; Yaroslav Koshkarev	Beach volleyball	Men's tournament	21 June
Silver	Nikita Shleikher	Diving	Men's 10 metre platform	21 June
Silver	Ekaterina Nekrasova	Diving	Women's 3 metre springboard	21 June
Silver	Valeriia Belkina; Yulia Nikitina; Zhanna Parkhometc	Gymnastics	Women's acrobatics groups balance	21 June
Silver	Valeriia Belkina; Yulia Nikitina; Zhanna Parkhometc	Gymnastics	Women's acrobatics groups dynamic	21 June
Silver	Alexei Klimov	Shooting	Men's 25 metre rapid fire pistol	21 June
Silver	Yana Zvereva	Fencing	Women's épée	23 June
Silver	Anastasiia Kirpichnikova	Swimming	Women's 800 metre freestyle	23 June
Silver	Sergey Khodos	Fencing	Men's épée	24 June
Silver	Yana Alborova	Fencing	Women's foil	24 June
Silver	Filip Shopin	Swimming	Men's 100 metre backstroke	24 June
Silver	Kirill Mordashev	Swimming	Men's 200 metre breaststroke	24 June
Silver	Ernest Maksumov	Swimming	Men's 1500 metre freestyle	24 June
Silver	Arina Openysheva	Swimming	Women's 100 metre freestyle	24 June
Silver	Timur Arslanov	Fencing	Men's foil	25 June
Silver	Gasan Gimbatov	Boxing	Men's +91 kg	26 June
Silver	Ivan Nifontov	Judo	Men's 81 kg	26 June
Silver	Vladimir Ivanov; Ivan Sozonov	Badminton	Men's doubles	27 June
Silver	Ekaterina Bolotova; Evgeniya Kosetskaya	Badminton	Women's doubles	27 June
Silver	Alexander Besputin	Boxing	Men's 69 kg	27 June
Silver	Sergey Bida; Anton Glebko; Dmitriy Gusev; Sergey Khodos	Fencing	Men's team épée	27 June
Silver	Igor Balyberdin	Swimming	Men's 400 metre individual medley	27 June
Silver	Maria Kameneva	Swimming	Women's 100 metre backstroke	27 June
Bronze	Ivanna Zaytseva	Karate	Women's kumite +68 kg	14 June
Bronze	Chingiz Labazanov	Wrestling	Men's Greco-Roman 75 kg	14 June
Bronze	Valentina Islamova Brik	Wrestling	Women's freestyle 48 kg	15 June
Bronze	Natalia Vorobieva	Wrestling	Women's freestyle 69 kg	15 June
Bronze	Elena Tkach	Shooting	Women's trap	16 June
Bronze	Alexey Denisenko	Taekwondo	Men's 68 kg	17 June
Bronze	Ilyas Bekbulatov	Wrestling	Men's freestyle 65 kg	17 June
Bronze	Abdusalam Gadisov	Wrestling	Men's freestyle 97 kg	17 June
Bronze	Nikita Ignatyev	Gymnastics	Men's artistic individual all-around	18 June
Bronze	Olga Ivanova	Taekwondo	Women's +67 kg	19 June
Bronze	Ilia Molchanov	Diving	Men's 3 metre springboard	20 June
Bronze	David Belyavskiy	Gymnastics	Men's floor exercise	20 June
Bronze	Nikita Ignatyev	Gymnastics	Men's horizontal bar	20 June
Bronze	Dukhik Dzhanazian; Denis Solovev	Gymnastics	Mixed aerobic pairs	21 June
Bronze	Azamat Sidakov	Sambo	Men's 74 kg	22 June
Bronze	Anna Shcherbakova	Sambo	Women's 64 kg	22 June
Bronze	Olga Zakhartsova	Sambo	Women's 68 kg	22 June
Bronze	Vladimir Gontcharov; Ekaterina Korshunova	Shooting	Mixed 10 metre air pistol	22 June
Bronze	Sergei Kruglov; Daria Vdovina	Shooting	Mixed 10 metre air rifle	22 June
Bronze	Daniil Pakhomov	Swimming	Men's 50 metre butterfly	23 June
Bronze	Ernest Maksumov	Swimming	Men's 400 metre freestyle	23 June
Bronze	Vladislav Kozlov; Aleksei Brianskiy; Elisei Stepanov; Igor Shadrin	Swimming	Men's 4 × 100 metre freestyle relay	23 June
Bronze	Adelina Zagidullina	Fencing	Women's foil	24 June
Bronze	Mariia Kameneva	Swimming	Women's 100 metre freestyle	24 June
Bronze	Anastasiia Kirpichnikova	Swimming	Women's 400 metre freestyle	24 June
Bronze	Pavel Silyagin	Boxing	Men's 81 kg	25 June
Bronze	Saiana Sagataeva	Boxing	Women's 51 kg	25 June
Bronze	Mikhail Pulyaev	Judo	Men's 66 kg	25 June
Bronze	Irina Dolgova	Judo	Women's 48 kg	25 June
Bronze	Natalia Kuziutina	Judo	Women's 52 kg	25 June
Bronze	Vladislav Kozlov	Swimming	Men's 100 metre freestyle	25 June
Bronze	Maria Kameneva	Swimming	Women's 50 metre backstroke	25 June
Bronze	Aleksandr Parasiuk	Judo	Men's visually impaired +90 kg	26 June
Bronze	Romain Larin	Swimming	Men's 200 metre backstroke	26 June
Bronze	Maxim Koptyakov	Boxing	Men's 75 kg	27 June
Bronze	Sadam Magomedov	Boxing	Men's 91 kg	27 June
Bronze	Timur Arslanov; Aleksey Khovanskiy; Timur Safin; Dmitry Zherebchenko	Fencing	Men's team foil	27 June
Bronze	Viktoriya Kovaleva; Yana Obvintseva; Mariya Ridel; Tatiana Sukhova	Fencing	Women's team sabre	27 June
Bronze	Renat Saidov	Judo	Men's +100 kg	27 June
Bronze	Aleksei Brianskiy	Swimming	Men's 50 metre freestyle	27 June
Bronze	Daniil Antipov	Swimming	Men's 100 metre butterfly	27 June
Bronze	Elisei Stepanov	Swimming	Men's 200 metre freestyle	27 June
Bronze	Daria Chikunova	Swimming	Women's 100 metre breaststroke	27 June
Bronze	Kirill Denisov; Kamal Khan-Magomedov; Alan Khubetsov; Ivan Nifontov; Mikhail Pulyaev; Renat Saidov; Kirill Voprosov; Denis Yartsev	Judo	Men's team	28 June
Bronze	Ilia Vlasov; Dmitry Kovalev (C); Ivan Demakov; Igor Kobzar; Alexander Markin; Igor Filippov; Alexey Kabeshov; Alexander Kimerov; Dmitrii Volkov; Victor Poletaev; Maksim Zhigalov; Egor Kliuka; Sergey Nikitin; Roman Bragin	Volleyball	Men's tournament	28 June

== Archery ==
Athlete	Event	Ranking round		Round of 64	Round of 32	Round of 16	Quarterfinals	Semifinals	Final / BM	
Athlete	Event	Score	Seed	Opposition Score	Opposition Score	Opposition Score	Opposition Score	Opposition Score	Opposition Score	Rank
Bair Tsybekdorzhiev	Men's individual	664	15	Kopnin (AZE); W 6–2	Ivashko (UKR); L 2–6	Did not advance				17
Alexander Kozhin	Men's individual	660	22	Slater (GBR); L 2–6	Did not advance					33
Beligto Tsynguev	Men's individual	646	40	Valladont (FRA); W 6–4	Daniel (FRA); L 3–7	Did not advance				17
Kristina Timofeeva	Women's individual	650	5	Velieva (AZE); W 6–0	Psarra (GRE); L 4–6	Did not advance				17
Inna Stepanova	Women's individual	647	7	Dielen (SUI); W 7–3	Aktuna (TUR); W 6–2	Sichenikova (UKR); L 5–6	Did not advance			9
Natalia Erdyniyeva	Women's individual	647	8	Cuthbert (IRL); W 6–0	Hunt (GBR); W 6–4	Winter (GER); L 1–7	Did not advance			9
Bair Tsybekdorzhiev; Alexander Kozhin; Beligto Tsynguev	Men's team	1970	8	—N/a		Poland; W 5–3	Netherlands; L 4–5	Did not advance		5
Kristina Timofeeva; Inna Stepanova; Natalia Erdyniyeva	Women's team	1944	2	—N/a		Switzerland; W 6–2	France; W 5–3	Italy; L 3–5	Ukraine; L 4–5	4
Kristina Timofeeva; Bair Tsybekdorzhiev	Mixed team	1314	5	—N/a		Poland; W 6–0	Ukraine; L 0–6	Did not advance		5

== Athletics ==
Russia did not send sportspeople for this sports event.

== Badminton ==
Athlete	Event	Group Stage				Round of 16	Quarterfinal	Semifinal	Final / BM	
Athlete	Event	Opposition Score	Opposition Score	Opposition Score	Rank	Opposition Score	Opposition Score	Opposition Score	Opposition Score	Rank
Vitalij Durkin; Nina Vislova	Mixed doubles	(Poland) Pietryja / Wojtkowska (POL); W (21–16, 21–11)	(Belgium) Oleffe / Annys (BEL); W (21–5, 21–8)	(Switzerland) Schaller / Burkart (SUI); W (21–12, 21–10)	1	—N/a	(Germany) Beck / Kattenbeck (GER); L (16–21, 19–21)	Did not advance		
Vladimir Ivanov; Ivan Sozonov	Men's doubles	(France) Kersaudy / Mittelheisser (FRA); W (21–15, 21–13)	(Turkey) Vural / Zorlu (TUR); W (21–11, 21–11)	(Azerbaijan) Qalandarov / Rzayev (AZE); W (21–7, 21–8)	1	—N/a	(Croatia) Durkinjak / Hoelbling (CRO); W (21–12, 21–13)	(Republic of Ireland) Magee / Magee (IRL); W (21–5, 21–9)	(Denmark) Boe / Mogensen (DEN); L (8–21, 12–21)	2nd place, silver medalist(s)
Vladimir Malkov	Men's singles	(Iceland) Gunnarsson (ISL); W (21–14, 21–12)	(Slovakia) Vicen (SVK); W (21–13, 21–16)	(Finland) Eetu (FIN); W (21–15, 21–18)	1	(Spain) Abián (ESP); L (23–25, 21–19, 15–21)	Did not advance			
Ekaterina Bolotova; Evgeniya Kosetskaya	Women's doubles	(France) Baumann / Fontaine (FRA); W (21–19, 21–12)	(Finland) Lindholm / Nyström (FIN); W (21–10, 21–13)	(Republic of Ireland) Boyle / Darragh (IRL); W (21–9, 21–9)	1	—N/a	(Spain) Molina / Ojeda (ESP); W (21–15, 21–11)	(Denmark) Grebak / Helsbøl (DEN); W (21–14, 14–21, 21–9)	(Bulgaria) Stoeva / Stoeva (BUL); L (21–12, 23–21)	2nd place, silver medalist(s)
Natalia Perminova	Women's singles	(Lithuania) Stapušaitytė (LIT); W (21–16, 21–9)	(Romania) Olariu (ROM); W (21–0, 21–0 w/o)	(Belarus) Zaitsava (BLR); W (21–19, 21–17)	1	(Spain) Azurmendi (ESP); L (18–21, 14–21)	Did not advance			
Ksenia Polikarpova	Women's singles	(Turkey) Yigit (TUR); L (21–18, 14–21, 3–21)	(Greece) Karkantzia (GRE); W (21–4, 21–4)	(Croatia) Sutara (CRO); W (21–11, 21–4)	2	(Estonia) Tolmoff (EST); W (19–21, 21–15, 21–19)	(Bulgaria) Nedelcheva (BUL); L (21–13, 11–21, 13–21)	Did not advance		

== Basketball 3x3 ==
Team roster

Men

- Ilia Aleksandrov
- Andrey Kanygin
- Leopold Lagutin
- Alexsandr Pavlov

Women

- Mariia Cherepanova
- Anna Leshkovtseva
- Tatiana Petrushina
- Tatiana Vidmer

Summary

Team	Event	Group stage				Round of 16	Quarterfinals	Semifinals	Final / BM	
Team	Event	Opposition Score	Opposition Score	Opposition Score	Rank	Opposition Score	Opposition Score	Opposition Score	Opposition Score	Rank
Russia men's	Men's tournament	Belgium; W 21–12	Spain; L 19–16	Turkey; W 21–18	1 Q	Estonia; W 19–18	Czech Republic; W 21–18	Slovenia; W 21–8	Spain; W 18–14	1st place, gold medalist(s)
Russia women's	Women's tournament	Israel; W 21–5	Romania; L 16–21	Lithuania; W 21–15	2 Q	Netherlands; W 20–12	Ireland; W 21–15	Spain; W 13–12	Ukraine; W 22–17	1st place, gold medalist(s)

== Beach soccer ==
Russia could compete at the European Games as she made it to the 2014 Euro Beach Soccer League Superfinal.

Pos	Team	Pld	W	OTW	OTL	L	GF	GA	GD	Pts	Group stage result
1	Italy	3	2	0	1	0	12	9	+3	6	Advance to semifinals
2	Russia	3	2	0	0	1	14	12	+2	6	Advance to semifinals
3	Spain	3	1	1	0	1	9	8	+1	4	Advance to classification matches
4	Hungary	3	0	0	0	3	9	15	−6	0	Advance to classification matches

First match(es) will be played: 24 June 2015. Source: baku2015.com
24 June 2015
19:00

Hungary	3–5	Russia

Beach Arena, Baku
25 June 2015
19:00

Russia	4–6	Italy

Beach Arena, Baku
26 June 2015
19:00

Russia	5–3	Spain

Beach Arena, Baku

Semifinals

27 June 2015
20:30

Portugal	1–2	Russia

Beach Arena, Baku

Final

28 June 2015
16:00

Italy	2–3	Russia (gold)

Beach Arena, Baku

== Boxing ==
Russia has qualified 15 boxers.

Men

Athlete	Event	Round of 32	Round of 16	Quarterfinals	Semifinals	Final	
Athlete	Event	Opposition Result	Opposition Result	Opposition Result	Opposition Result	Opposition Result	Rank
Bator Sagaluev	49 kg	—N/a	Horn (GBR); W 3–0	Ungvári (HUN); W 3–0	Ünlü (TUR); W 3–0	Irvine (IRL); W 2–1	1st place, gold medalist(s)
Vasilii Vetkin	52 kg	Bye	Chiladze (GEO); W 3–0	Touba (GER); L 1–2	Did not advance		
Bakhtovar Nazirov	56 kg	Walker (IRL); W 2–1	Gojan (MDA); W 3–0	D'Andrea (ITA); W 3–0	Aliyev (AZE); W 2–1	Asanau (BLR); W 2–1	1st place, gold medalist(s)
Konstantin Bogomazov	60 kg	Skurdelis (LTU); W 3–0	Varga (HUN); L 0–2	Did not advance			
Maxim Dadashev	64 kg	Łęgowski (POL); W 3–0	Walsh (IRL); L 1–2	Did not advance			
Alexander Besputin	69 kg	Bye	Sissokho (ESP); W 3–0	Cissokho (FRA); W 3–0	Samofalov (UKR); W 3–0	Baghirov (AZE); L 0–3	2nd place, silver medalist(s)
Maxim Koptyakov	75 kg	Steffensen (DEN); W 3–0	Radovan (GER); W 3–0	Cavallaro (ITA); W 2–1	O'Reilly (IRL); L WO	Did not advance	3rd place, bronze medalist(s)
Pavel Silyagin	81 kg	Bye	Strnisko (SVK); W 3–0	Teziev (GER); W 3–0	Mammadov (AZE); L 0–3	Did not advance	3rd place, bronze medalist(s)
Sadam Magomedov	91 kg	Tamašauskas (LTU); W 3–0	Guledani (GEO); W 3–0	Pervizaj (GER); W 3–0	Abdullayev (AZE); L 0–3	Did not advance	3rd place, bronze medalist(s)
Gasan Gimbatov	+91 kg	Bye	Mindoljević (CRO); W 2–1	Sudzilouski (BLR); W 3–0	Majidov (AZE); W WO	Joyce (GBR); L 0–3	2nd place, silver medalist(s)

Women

Athlete	Event	Round of 16	Quarterfinals	Semifinals	Final	
Athlete	Event	Opposition Result	Opposition Result	Opposition Result	Opposition Result	Rank
Saiana Sagataeva	51 kg	Gordini (ITA); W 2–1	Smith (IRL); W 2–1	Drabik (POL); L 0–3	Did not advance	3rd place, bronze medalist(s)
Elena Savelyeva	54 kg	Walsh (IRL); W 3–0	Taş (TUR); W 3–0	Alimardanova (AZE); W 3–0	Davide (ITA); W 3–0	1st place, gold medalist(s)
Zinaida Dobrynina	60 kg	Brügger (SUI); W 3–0	Alekseevna (AZE); L 0–3	Did not advance		
Anastasia Belyakova	64 kg	Schmoranzová (CZE); W 3–0	Nagy (HUN); W TKO	Ryan (GBR); W 3–0	Alberti (ITA); W 3–0	1st place, gold medalist(s)
Yaroslava Yakushina	75 kg	Cavadova (AZE); W 2–0	Fidura (POL); L 1–2	Did not advance		

== Canoe sprint ==
Russia has qualified 19 athletes.

Men

Athlete	Event	Heats		Semifinals		Final	
Athlete	Event	Time	Rank	Time	Rank	Time	Rank
Andrey Kraitor	C-1 200 m	39.337	2 QS	38.540	1 FA	40.199	4
Alexey Korovashkov; Ilya Pervukhin	C-2 1000 m	3:38.668	3 QF	—N/a		3:34.453	2nd place, silver medalist(s)
Evgenii Lukantsov	K-1 200 m	35.515	3 QS	35.108	3 FA	36.310	6
Vasily Pogreban	K-1 1000 m	3:39.410	3 QF	3:29.596	6 FB	3:42.691	18
Nikolay Chervov	K-1 5000 m	—N/a				21:18.387	7
Alexandr Dyachenko; Yury Postrygay	K-2 200 m	31.946	3 QF	—N/a		32.627	6
Kirill Luchkin; Oleg Zhestkov	K-2 1000 m	3:18.002	6 QS	3:08.601	2 FA	3:15.002	7
Vladislav Blintcov; Vasily Pogreban; Anton Ryakhov; Aleksandr Sergeev	K-4 1000 m	3:01.368	6 QS	2:50.884	3 FA	3:08.034	2nd place, silver medalist(s)

Women

Athlete	Event	Heats		Semifinals		Final	
Athlete	Event	Time	Rank	Time	Rank	Time	Rank
Natalia Podolskaya	K-1 200 m	40.286	1 QF	—N/a		41.165	2nd place, silver medalist(s)
Kira Stepanova	K-1 500 m	1:53.855	5 QS	1:51.476	5 FB	2:07.601	11
Yuliana Salakhova	K-1 5000 m	—N/a				23:29.940	5
Elena Anyshina; Svetlana Chernigovskaya	K-2 200 m	1:40.919	3 QF	—N/a		1:56.411	9
Vera Sobetova; Kira Stepanova	K-2 500 m	39.346	5 QS	38.300	4	Did not advance	
Elena Anyshina; Svetlana Chernigovskaya; Yuliana Salakhova; Kira Stepanova	K-4 500 m	1:36.757	5 QS	1:30.969	2 FA	1:35.627	7

Qualification Legend: FA = Qualify to final (medal); FB = Qualify to final B (non-medal)

== Cycling ==
=== Road ===
Russia has qualified 11 athletes.

Men

Athlete	Event	Time	Rank
Sergey Chernetskiy	Road race	5:33:43	40
Pavel Kochetkov	Road race	5:27:33	11
Alexey Tsatevich	Road race	DNF	
Yuri Trofimov	Road race	5:33:43	33
Anton Vorobyev	Time trial	1:01:54.48	6
Anton Vorobyev	Road race	DNF	
Ilnur Zakarin	Time trial	1:02:50.56	13
Ilnur Zakarin	Road race	DNF	

Women

Athlete	Event	Time	Rank
Tatiana Antoshina	Road race	3:24:18	8
Tatiana Antoshina	Time trial	33:38.73	4
Natalia Boyarskaya	Road race	3:34:09	49
Natalia Boyarskaya	Time trial	36:06.34	21
Anastasiia Iakovenko	Road race	3:25:57	36
Oxana Kozonchuk	Road race	3:34:09	37
Elena Kuchinskaya	Road race	3:25:53	17

=== Mountain biking ===
Russia has qualified one athlete.

Athlete	Event	Time	Rank
Ekaterina Anoshina	Women's cross-country	1:42:33	16

=== BMX ===
Russia has qualified four athletes.

Athlete	Event	Qualifying Time Trial		Time Trial Super Final		Motos		Semifinals		Final	
Athlete	Event	Time	Rank	Time	Rank	Points	Rank	Time	Rank	Time	Rank
Aleksandr Katyshev	Men's BMX	34.974	21	Did not advance		13	3 Q	35.614	6	Did not advance	
Evgeny Kleshchenko	Men's BMX	34.514	18	Did not advance		9	3 Q	34.534	4 Q	35.138	7
Evgeny Komarov	Men's BMX	33.720	6 Q	34.833	15	7	2 Q	34.006	3 Q	34.848	5
Natalia Suvorova	Women's BMX	38.147	6 Q	56.873	8	16	5	Did not advance			

== Diving ==
Russia has qualified 19 athletes.

Men

Athlete	Event	Preliminaries		Final	
Athlete	Event	Points	Rank	Points	Rank
Ilia Molchanov	1 m springboard	534.80	1 Q	512.20	2nd place, silver medalist(s)
Nikita Shleikher	1 m springboard	507.50	2 Q	543.80	1st place, gold medalist(s)
Alexandr Belevtcev	3 m springboard	457.75	15 R	Did not advance	
Ilia Molchanov	3 m springboard	528.45	1 Q	520.35	3rd place, bronze medalist(s)
Boris Efremov	10 m platform	483.15	3 Q	481.40	5
Nikita Shleikher	10 m platform	520.65	1 Q	556.55	2nd place, silver medalist(s)
Ilia Molchanov; Nikita Nikolaev	3 m synchronized springboard	—N/a		324.69	1st place, gold medalist(s)

Women

Athlete	Event	Preliminaries		Final	
Athlete	Event	Points	Rank	Points	Rank
Ekaterina Nekrasova	1 m springboard	407.00	1 Q	386.80	4
Maria Polyakova	1 m springboard	383.15	3 Q	419.45	1st place, gold medalist(s)
Ekaterina Nekrasova	3 m springboard	413.00	5 Q	443.05	2nd place, silver medalist(s)
Maria Polyakova	3 m springboard	426.45	3 Q	411.45	5
Anna Chuinyshena	10 m platform	386.80	3 Q	429.15	2nd place, silver medalist(s)
Yulia Timoshinina	10 m platform	409.60	3 Q	363.40	5
Elena Chernykh; Maria Polyakova	3 m synchronized springboard	—N/a		276.90	2nd place, silver medalist(s)

== Fencing ==
Russia has qualified 24 fencers.

Men

Athlete	Event	Pool round		Round of 32	Round of 16	Quarterfinal	Semifinal	Final / BM	
Athlete	Event	Opposition Score	Seed	Opposition Score	Opposition Score	Opposition Score	Opposition Score	Opposition Score	Rank
Sergey Bida	Épée	Nikishin (UKR) L 2–5; Niggeler (SUI) W 5–4; Trevejo (FRA) L 3–4; Bino (ITA) W 5–2; Nasibov (AZE) W 5–2; File (HUN) L 4–5	16 Q	Verwijlen (NED); L 12–15	Did not advance				
Anton Glebko	Épée	Vuorinen (FIN) L 4–5; Jefremenko (LAT) W 5–0; Jérent (FRA) L 2–5; Hasanov (AZE) W 5–1; Santarelli (ITA) L 3–4; Kuhn (SUI) L 4–5	24 Q	Jérent (FRA); L 7–15	Did not advance				
Dmitriy Gusev	Épée	Zawrotniak (POL) L 1–5; Gustin (FRA) L 3–5; Abajo (ESP) W 5–2; Piasecki (NOR) L 4–5; Szényi (HUN) W 5–4; Staub (SUI) W 5–4	21 Q	Berta (HUN); L 12–15	Did not advance				
Sergey Khodos	Épée	Brunold (SUI) L 4–5; Herpe (ISR) W 5–4; Berta (HUN) L 4–5; Fichera (ITA) W 5–4; Borel (FRA) L 3–5; Maharramov (AZE) W 5–2	18 Q	Herpe (ISR); W 15–14	Novosjolov (EST); W 15–12	Fichera (ITA); W 15–12	Piasecki (NOR); W 15–12	Trevejo (FRA); L 8–15	2nd place, silver medalist(s)
Sergey Bida; Anton Glebko; Dmitriy Gusev; Sergey Khodos	Team épée	—N/a				Azerbaijan; W 45–26	Switzerland; W 43–38	France; L 32–45	2nd place, silver medalist(s)
Timur Arslanov	Foil	Janda (POL) W 5–2; Pauty (FRA) W 5–1; Rosatelli (ITA) L 3–5; Kruse (GBR) W 5–2; Babaoglu (TUR) W 5–2	3 Q	Bye	Yunes (UKR); W 15–10	Simon (FRA); W 15–7	Helissey (FRA); W 15–10	Foconi (ITA); L 11–15	2nd place, silver medalist(s)
Alexey Khovanskiy	Foil	Mourrain (FRA) W 5–1; Tsoronis (DEN) W 5–3; Perelmann (GER) W 5–3; Lorenzo (ITA) W 5–3; Vegh (SVK) W 5–1	1 Q	Bye	Dörr (GER); L 10–15	Did not advance			
Timur Safin	Foil	Surwiłło (POL) W 5–0; Uftring (GER) W 5–2; Pranz (AUT) L 4–5; Tofalides (GBR) W 5–3; Or (ISR) W 5–2	10 Q	Mourrain (FRA); W 15–7	Helissey (FRA); L 13–15	Did not advance			
Dmitry Zherebchenko	Foil	Byk (BLR) W 5–2; Simon (FRA) L 3–5; Jovanović (CRO) W 5–3; Ingargiola (ITA) L 2–5; Kawiecki (POL) L 4–5	18 Q	Kahl (GER); W 15–11	Pranz (AUT); W 15–8	Helissey (FRA); L 8–15	Did not advance		
Timur Arslanov; Alexey Khovanskiy; Timur Safin; Dmitry Zherebchenko	Team foil	—N/a				Bye	Italy; L 42–45	France; W 45–33	3rd place, bronze medalist(s)
Ilya Motorin	Sabre	Repetti (ITA) L 4–5; Van Holsbeke (BEL) L 0–5; Yagodka (UKR) L 2–5; Singer (HUN) W 5–2; Bucur (ROU) W 5–3	24 Q	Casares (ESP); L 13–15	Did not advance				
Nikita Proskura	Sabre	Pellegrini (ITA) L 2–5; Willau (AUT) W 5–0; Aghakishiyev (AZE) W 5–3; Hübers (GER) L 0–5; Arnaudov (BUL) W 5–2	17 Q	Trushakov (RUS); L 6–15	Did not advance				
Boris Savich	Sabre	Rousset (FRA) W 5–0; Teodosiu (ROU) W 5–1; Schrödter (GER) W 5–2; Mateisin (MDA) W 5–0; Ravasz (HUN) L 4–5	2 Q	Bye	Repetti (ITA); W 15–12	Dolniceanu (ROM); L 10–15	Did not advance		
Alexander Trushakov	Sabre	Buikevich (BLR) L 2–5; Safarov (AZE) W 5–0; Csaba (HUN) W 5–3; Miracco (ITA) L 3–5; Kindler (GER) W 5–4	16 Q	Proskura (RUS); W 15–6	Pellegrini (ITA); L 12–15	Did not advance			
Ilya Motorin; Nikita Proskura; Boris Savich; Alexander Trushakov	Team sabre	—N/a				Azerbaijan; W 45–18	Italy; L 42–45	Germany; L 44–45	4

Women

Athlete	Event	Pool round		Round of 32	Round of 16	Quarterfinal	Semifinal	Final / BM	
Athlete	Event	Opposition Score	Seed	Opposition Score	Opposition Score	Opposition Score	Opposition Score	Opposition Score	Rank
Tatyana Andryushina	Épée	Tătăran (ROM) L 4–5; Malikova (AZE) W 5–1; Kock (FIN) L 4–5; Santuccio (ITA) W 5–1; Shemyakina (UKR) L 2–5; Lehis (EST) L 3–5	25 Q	Heidemann (GER); W 15–14	Beljajeva (EST); L 11–15	Did not advance			
Olga Kochneva	Épée	Bohus (HUN) W 5–2; Batini (ITA) L 3–4; Kirpu (EST) W 5–1; Huseynova (AZE) W 5–0; Lawrence (GBR) W 3–2; Caran (SRB) W 5–3	3 Q	Bye	Gherman (ROM); L 10–15	Did not advance			
Anna Sivkova	Épée	Embrich (EST) W 5–3; Heidemann (GER) W 5–4; Pop (ROM) W 5–2; Briasco (ITA) W 5–4; Fautsch (LUX) L 2–5; Várnai (HUN) W 5–0	5 Q	Bye	Kock (FIN); L 14–15	Did not advance			
Yana Zvereva	Épée	Kun (HUN) W 5–4; Malikova (AZE) W 5–3; Marinuk (ISR) L 4–5; Schmidl (AUT) W 5–2; Gherman (ROU) W 5–3; Rizzi (ITA) L 2–5	10 Q	Santuccio (ITA); W 13–10	Kun (HUN); W 15–10	Nelip (POL); W 14–11	Gherman (ROU); W 15–8	Brânză (ROU); L 11–15	2nd place, silver medalist(s)
Tatyana Andryushina; Olga Kochneva; Anna Sivkova; Yana Zvereva	Team épée	—N/a				Azerbaijan; W 45–19	Romania; L 24–31	Italy; L 36–40	4
Yana Alborova	Foil	Kontochristopoulou (GRE) W 5–0; Walczyk (POL) W 5–0; Erba (ITA) L 4–5; Schmél (HUN) W 5–1; Golubytskyi (GER) W 5–4	3 Q	Bye	Mpah-Njanga (FRA); W 15–12	Sauer (GER); W 15–11	Cipriani (ITA); W 15–10	Volpi (ITA); L 11–15	2nd place, silver medalist(s)
Anastasia Ivanova	Foil	Lupkovics (HUN) W 5–1; Hampel (GER) L 0–5; Jubenot (FRA) W 5–3; Golebiowska (POL) W 5–2; Cini (ITA) W 5–0	5 Q	Bímová (CZE); W 15–5	Boldor (ROM); W 15–8	Zagidullina (RUS); L 9–13	Did not advance		
Diana Yakovleva	Foil	Leleyko (UKR) W 5–4; Gólya (HUN) W 4–3; Wohlgemuth (AUT) L 3–4; Cellerová (SVK) W 5–2; Chrzanowska (POL) W 5–2	7 Q	Kontochristopoulou (GRE); W 15–8	Cipriani (ITA); L 9–15	Did not advance			
Adelina Zagidullina	Foil	Pásztor (HUN) W 5–3; Bímová (CZE) W 5–2; Cipriani (ITA) W 5–4; Szymczak (POL) L 4–5; Mpah-Njanga (FRA) L 2–5	13 Q	Karamete (TUR); W 15–1	Gólya (HUN); W 15–10	Ivanova (RUS); W 13–9	Volpi (ITA); L 13–15	Did not advance	3rd place, bronze medalist(s)
Yana Alborova; Anastasia Ivanova; Diana Yakovlevna; Adelina Zagidullina	Team foil	—N/a				Bye	Poland; W 45–21	France; W 45–18	1st place, gold medalist(s)
Victoriya Kovaleva	Sabre	Bunyatova (AZE) L 4–5; Pascu (ROM) W 5–2; Gevaert (BEL) W 5–1; Zhovnir (UKR) W 5–4; Itzkowitz (GBR) L 3–5	12 Q	Zhovnir (UKR); L 14–15	Did not advance				
Yana Obvintseva	Sabre	Wątor (POL) W 5–3; Rifkiss (FRA) L 3–5; Kakhiani (GEO) W 5–3; Komashchuk (UKR) W 5–2; Limbach (GER) L 3–5	14 Q	Pascu (ROM); W 15–11	Mikina (AZE); W 15–13	Wątor (POL); L 10–15	Did not advance		
Mariya Ridel	Sabre	Ibrahimova (AZE) L 4–5; Kravatska (UKR) W 5–2; Ágústsdóttir (ISL) W 5–1; Navarria (ITA) L 4–5; Balzer (FRA) W 5–1	9 Q	Balzer (FRA); W 15–10	Bunyatova (AZE); L 9–15	Did not advance			
Tatiana Sukhova	Sabre	Kaleta (POL) W 5–0; Ciaraglia (ITA) L 4–5; Mikina (AZE) L 2–5; Andreyeva (BLR) W 5–2; Vila (ESP) L 2–5	20 Q	Stoltz (FRA); W 15–14	Kravatska (UKR); L 13–15	Did not advance			
Viktoriya Kovaleva; Yana Obvintseva; Mariya Ridel; Tatiana Sukhova	Team sabre	—N/a				Bye	Ukraine; L 34–45	France; W 45–29	3rd place, bronze medalist(s)

== Gymnastics ==
=== Acrobatic ===
Women's groups

Athlete	Event	Qualification				Final				
Athlete	Event	Balance	Dynamic	Total	Rank	Balance	Dynamic	Combined	Total	Rank
Valeria Belkina; Yulia Nikitina; Zhanna Parkhometc	All-around	28.170	28.740	56.910	2 Q	—N/a		28.520	85.430	2nd place, silver medalist(s)
Valeria Belkina; Yulia Nikitina; Zhanna Parkhometc	Balance	28.170	—N/a	28.170	4 Q	28.550	—N/a		28.550	2nd place, silver medalist(s)
Valeria Belkina; Yulia Nikitina; Zhanna Parkhometc	Dynamic	—N/a	28.740	28.740	1 Q	—N/a	28.190	—N/a	28.190	2nd place, silver medalist(s)

Mixed pairs

Athlete	Event	Qualification				Final				
Athlete	Event	Balance	Dynamic	Total	Rank	Balance	Dynamic	Combined	Total	Rank
Marina Chernova; Georgy Pataraya	All-around	30.010	29.550	59.560	1 Q	—N/a		29.750	89.310	1st place, gold medalist(s)
Marina Chernova; Georgy Pataraya	Balance	30.010	—N/a	30.010	1 Q	29.760	—N/a		29.760	1st place, gold medalist(s)
Marina Chernova; Georgy Pataraya	Dynamic	—N/a	29.550	29.550	1 Q	—N/a	29.300	—N/a	29.300	1st place, gold medalist(s)

=== Aerobic ===
Russia has a total of six athletes after the performance at the 2013 Aerobic Gymnastics European Championships. One gymnast from pairs must compete in the group, making the total athletes to 6.

- Pairs – 1 pair of 2 athletes
- Groups – 1 team of 5 athletes

Athlete	Event	Qualification		Final	
Athlete	Event	Score	Rank	Score	Rank
Dukhik Dzhanazian; Denis Solovev	Mixed pairs	20.350	4 Q	20.500	3rd place, bronze medalist(s)
Dukhik Dzhanazian; Garsevan Dzhanazian; Roman Semenov; Denis Solovev; Ruslan Zubairov	Groups	20.430	4 Q	20.638	4

=== Artistic ===
- Men's – 3 quota places
- Women's – 3 quota places

Men
Team

Athlete	Event	Apparatus						Total	Rank
Athlete	Event	F	PH	R	V	PB	HB	Total	Rank
David Belyavskiy	Team	15.100 Q	14.800 Q	14.100	13.766	15.600 Q	DNS	73.366	60
Nikita Ignatiev	Team	14.300	14.366	15.000 Q	14.900	15.133	15.366 Q	89.065 Q	2 Q
Nikolai Kuksenkov	Team	14.400	13.566	14.533	14.766	15.166	14.966	87.397	5
Total	Team	29.500	29.166	29.533	29.666	30.766	30.332	178.963	1st place, gold medalist(s)

Individual finals

Athlete	Event	Apparatus						Total	Rank
Athlete	Event	F	PH	R	V	PB	HB	Total	Rank
David Belyavskiy	Floor	15.000	—N/a					15.000	3rd place, bronze medalist(s)
David Belyavskiy	Pommel horse	—N/a	13.900	—N/a				13.900	4
David Belyavskiy	Parallel bars	—N/a				15.700	—N/a	15.700	2nd place, silver medalist(s)
Nikita Ignatiev	All-around	14.900	14.300	15.033	14.966	15.266	12.900	87.365	3rd place, bronze medalist(s)
Nikita Ignatiev	Rings	—N/a		15.333	—N/a			15.333	2nd place, silver medalist(s)
Nikita Ignatiev	Horizontal bar	—N/a					15.166	15.166	3rd place, bronze medalist(s)

Women
Team

Athlete	Event	Apparatus				Total	Rank
Athlete	Event	F	BB	V	UB	Total	Rank
Victoria Komova	Team	13.300	14.233	14.566	14.866	56.965	3
Aliya Mustafina	Team	13.966 Q	14.566	15.133	15.200 Q	58.865 Q	1 Q
Seda Tutkhalyan	Team	13.600	14.600 Q	14.966 Q	14.166	57.332	2
Total	Team	27.566	29.166	30.099	30.066	116.897	1st place, gold medalist(s)

Individual finals

Athlete	Event	Apparatus				Total	Rank
Athlete	Event	F	BB	V	UB	Total	Rank
Aliya Mustafina	All-around	13.700	14.500	14.866	15.500	58.566	1st place, gold medalist(s)
Aliya Mustafina	Uneven bars	—N/a			15.400	15.400	1st place, gold medalist(s)
Aliya Mustafina	Floor	14.200	—N/a			14.200	2nd place, silver medalist(s)
Seda Tutkhalyan	Balance beam	n/a	13.566	—N/a		13.566	5
Seda Tutkhalyan	Vault	—N/a		14.683	n/a	14.683	2nd place, silver medalist(s)

=== Rhythmic ===
Russia has qualified one athlete after the performance at the 2013 Rhythmic Gymnastics European Championships.

- Individual – 2 quota places

Individual

Athlete	Event	Final & Qualification					
Athlete	Event	Hoop	Ball	Clubs	Ribbon	Total	Rank
Yana Kudryavtseva	All-around	18.850	19.100 Q	19.050 Q	19.100 Q	76.100	1st place, gold medalist(s)
Yana Kudryavtseva	Ball	—N/a	18.950	—N/a		18.950	1st place, gold medalist(s)
Yana Kudryavtseva	Clubs	—N/a		19.200	—N/a	19.200	1st place, gold medalist(s)
Yana Kudryavtseva	Ribbon	—N/a			19.000	19.000	1st place, gold medalist(s)
Margarita Mamun	All-around	18.900 Q	18.950	18.850	18.950	75.650	2nd place, silver medalist(s)
Margarita Mamun	Hoop	18.850	—N/a			18.850	1st place, gold medalist(s)

Group

Athlete	Event	Final			
Athlete	Event	5 ribbons	6 clubs 2 hoops	Total	Rank
Diana Borisova; Daria Kleshcheva; Anastasia Maksimova; Anastasiia Tatareva; Maria Tolkacheva; Sofya Skomorokh	All-around	18.000 Q	17.300 Q	35.300	1st place, gold medalist(s)
Diana Borisova; Anastasia Maksimova; Anastasiia Tatareva; Maria Tolkacheva; Sofya Skomorokh	Ribbons	18.000	—N/a	18.000	1st place, gold medalist(s)
Daria Kleshcheva; Anastasia Maksimova; Anastasiia Tatareva; Maria Tolkacheva; Sofya Skomorokh	6 Clubs and 2 Hoops	—N/a	16.400	16.400	6

=== Trampoline ===
Russia qualified two athletes based on the results at the 2014 European Trampoline Championships. The gymnasts competed in both the individual and the synchronized event.

- Men's – 2 quota places
- Women's – 2 quota places

Athlete	Event	Qualification		Final	
Athlete	Event	Score	Rank	Score	Rank
Mikhail Melnik	Men's individual	90.105	21	Did not advance	
Dmitry Ushakov	Men's individual	104.975	3 Q	60.090	1st place, gold medalist(s)
Mikhail Melnik; Dmitry Ushakov	Men's synchronized	88.800	2 Q	51.100	1st place, gold medalist(s)
Anna Kornetskaya	Women's individual	98.350	6	Did not advance	
Yana Pavlova	Women's individual	101.525	2 Q	54.335	1st place, gold medalist(s)
Anna Kornetskaya; Yana Pavlova	Women's synchronized	84.700	3 Q	46.400	1st place, gold medalist(s)

== Judo ==
Russia has qualified 20 athletes.

Men

Athlete	Event	Round of 64	Round of 32	Round of 16	Quarterfinals	Semifinals	Repechage	Final / BM	
Athlete	Event	Opposition Result	Opposition Result	Opposition Result	Opposition Result	Opposition Result	Opposition Result	Opposition Result	Rank
Beslan Mudranov	−60 kg	—N/a	Bye	Petřikov (CZE); W 111–000s2	Englmaier (GER); W 001–001s2	Mooren (NED); W 100s1–0	Bye	Safarov (AZE); W 100s2–0s2	1st place, gold medalist(s)
Kamal Khan-Magomedov	−66 kg	—N/a	Vukićević (SRB); W 100s1–000s1	Shmailov (ISR); W 100s1–000s2	Zantaraia (UKR); W 100–000s2	Oleinic (POR); W 100–000s2	Bye	Korval (FRA); W 010s3–001s2	1st place, gold medalist(s)
Mikhail Pulyaev	−66 kg	—N/a	Van Gansbeke (BEL); L 010s2–000s2	César (POR); W 101s1–000s3	Seidl (GER); W 100–000	Korval (FRA); L 000s2–100s2	Bye	Shikhalizada (AZE); W 010s3–000	3rd place, bronze medalist(s)
Denis Yartsev	−73 kg	Bye	Vanlıoğlu (TUR); W 000s1–000s2	Ramírez (ESP); W 002–000	Ungvári (HUN); W 000s1–000s3	Muki (ISR); L 000s2–100s1	Bye	Drakšič (SLO); L 001s1–100s3	5
Alan Khubetsov	−81 kg	Bye	Majdov (SRB); W 010s2–000s2	Csoknyai (HUN); W 100–000s1	Maresch (GER); L 000s3–000s2	Did not advance	Stsiashenka (BLR); L 000s2–001s3	Did not advance	7
Ivan Nifontov	−81 kg	Bye	Vanlıoğlu (TUR); W 100s1–000	Luz (POR); W 000s1–000s2	Dudchyk (UKR); W 101s1–000s2	Wieczerzak (GER); W 001s1–000s1	Bye	Tchrikishvili (GEO); L 010–010s1	2nd place, silver medalist(s)
Kirill Denisov	−90 kg	Bye	Wenzinger (SUI); W 100–000s2	Facente (ITA); W 100–000	Iliadis (GRE); W 000s2–000s3	Tóth (HUN); W 000s1–000s2	Bye	Liparteliani (GEO); W 001s1–000	1st place, gold medalist(s)
Kirill Voprosov	−90 kg	Bye	Grossklaus (SUI); L 000s1–010s1	Did not advance					
Renat Saidov	+100 kg	—N/a	Bye	Božinić (SRB); W 100–000	Khammo (UKR); W 000s1–000s3	Sasson (ISR); L 001–100s1	Bye	Matiashvili (GEO); W 001–000	3rd place, bronze medalist(s)
Kirill Denisov; Kamal Khan-Magomedov; Alan Khubetsov; Ivan Nifontov; Mikhail Pulyaev; Renat Saidov; Kirill Voprosov; Denis Yartsev	Team	—N/a		Bye	Ukraine; W 4–1	France; L 1–4	Bye	Germany; W 3–2	3rd place, bronze medalist(s)
Aleksandr Parasiuk	Blind +90 kg	—N/a			Taurines (FRA); W 100–000	Pominov (UKR); L 000–100	Bye	Hayran (TUR); W 101–000	3rd place, bronze medalist(s)

Women

Athlete	Event	Round of 32	Round of 16	Quarterfinals	Semifinals	Repechage	Final / BM	
Athlete	Event	Opposition Result	Opposition Result	Opposition Result	Opposition Result	Opposition Result	Opposition Result	Rank
Irina Dolgova	−48 kg	Bye	Freitas (POR); W 101s1–000s2	Csernoviczki (HUN); W 001s1–000s1	Van Snick (BEL); L 000–100	Bye	Figueroa (ESP); W 010s2–000s1	3rd place, bronze medalist(s)
Kristina Rumyantseva	−48 kg	Gurbanli (AZE); L 000s1–100	Did not advance					
Natalia Kuziutina	−52 kg	Bye	Perenc (POL); W 000s1–000s2	Florian (ROU); W 001s2–000s2	Euranie (FRA); L 000s2–000s1	Bye	Giuffrida (ITA); W 000s1–000s2	3rd place, bronze medalist(s)
Yulia Kazarina	−52 kg	Muller (LUX); W 011–000	Levytska (UKR); L 000s1–002s2	Did not advance				
Irina Zabludina	−57 kg	Smythe-Davis (GBR); W 011s3–000s1	Pavia (FRA); L 000–100	Did not advance				
Marta Labazina	−63 kg	Bye	Cachola (POR); L 000–100	Did not advance				
Irina Gazieva	−70 kg	Émane (FRA); L 000s4–100s2	Did not advance					
Anastasiya Dmitrieva	−78 kg	Apotekar (SLO); W 100s2–000s2	Powell (GBR); L 000s2–011s3	Did not advance				
Ksenia Chibisova	+78 kg	Bye	Pakenytė (LTU); L 000–101	Did not advance				
Ksenia Chibisova; Anastasiya Dmitrieva; Irina Gazieva; Natalia Kuziutina; Marta Labazina; Yulia Kazarina; Irina Zabludina	Team	—N/a		Poland; W 3–2	Germany; L 2–3	Bye	Italy; L 2–3	5
Natalia Ovchinnikova	Blind −57 kg	—N/a		Cherniak (UKR); L 000–100	Did not advance	Kılıç (TUR); L 000s2–100	Did not advance	7

== Karate ==
Kumite

Athlete	Event	Group stage				Semifinals	Final / BM	
Athlete	Event	Opposition Score	Opposition Score	Opposition Score	Rank	Opposition Score	Opposition Score	Rank
Evgeny Plakhutin	Men's −60 kg	Pavlov (MKD); D 0−0	Antić (SRB); L 0−2	Agoudjil (FRA); D 0−0	3	Did not advance		
Ivanna Zaytseva	Women's +68 kg	Kuusisto (FIN); D 0−0	Hocaoğlu (TUR); D 0−0	Ganeva (BUL); W 2−1	2 Q	Martinović (CRO); L 2−5	Antunovic (SWE); W 2−1	3rd place, bronze medalist(s)

== Sambo ==
Russia sent eight athletes for the sambo event.

Men

Athlete	Event	Round of 16	Quarterfinal	Semifinal	Repechage	Final / BM	
Athlete	Event	Opposition Result	Opposition Result	Opposition Result	Opposition Result	Opposition Result	Rank
Aymergen Atkunov	−57 kg	—N/a	Kirakosyan (ARM); W 4–0 ^{TV}	Burdz (BLR); W 3–1 ^{VP}	Bye	Gasumov (AZE); W 4–0 ^{TV}	1st place, gold medalist(s)
Azamat Sidakov	−74 kg	Menéndez (ESP); W 3–1 ^{VP}	Babiichuk (UKR); W 3–1 ^{VP}	Papou (BLR); L 3–1 ^{VP}	Bye	Damian (ROU); W 4–0 ^{TV}	3rd place, bronze medalist(s)
Alsim Chernoskulov	−90 kg	—N/a	Karbelashvili (GEO); W 2–0 ^{MA}	Gasimov (AZE); W 4–0 ^{TV}	Bye	Kazusionak (BLR); W 2–0 ^{MA}	1st place, gold medalist(s)
Artem Osipenko	+100 kg	—N/a	Malcic (ROU); W 4–0 ^{TV}	Rybak (BLR); W 4–0 ^{TV}	Bye	Safarbayov (AZE); W 4–0 ^{TV}	1st place, gold medalist(s)

Women

Athlete	Event	Round of 16	Quarterfinal	Semifinal	Repechage	Final / BM	
Athlete	Event	Opposition Result	Opposition Result	Opposition Result	Opposition Result	Opposition Result	Rank
Anna Kharitonova	−52 kg	—N/a	Balasanyan (ARM); W 4–0 ^{TV}	Varbanova (BUL); W 3–1 ^{VP}	Bye	Khalilova (AZE); L 0–4 ^{TV}	2nd place, silver medalist(s)
Yana Kostenko	−60 kg	Sharadze (GEO); W 4–0 ^{TV}	Huseynova (AZE); W 4–0 ^{TV}	Prakapenka (BLR); W 2–0 ^{MA}	Bye	Stefanova (BUL); W 4–0 ^{TV}	1st place, gold medalist(s)
Anna Shcherbakova	−64 kg	—N/a	Budeanu (ROU); W 3–1 ^{VP}	Matsko (BLR); L 1–3 ^{VP}	Bye	Ivanova (BUL); W 3–1 ^{VP}	3rd place, bronze medalist(s)
Olga Zakhartsova	−68 kg	—N/a	Gerasymenko (UKR); W 3–1 ^{VP}	Jandrić (SRB); L 0–4 ^{TV}	Bye	Repesco (MDA); W 4–0 ^{TV}	3rd place, bronze medalist(s)

== Shooting ==
Men

Athlete	Event	Qualification		Semifinal		Final	
Athlete	Event	Points	Rank	Points	Rank	Points	Rank
Alexey Alipov	Trap	123	1 Q	13+8	2 Q	15	1st place, gold medalist(s)
Sergey Chervyakovskiy	10 m air pistol	577	12	—N/a		Did not advance	
Vladimir Gontcharov	10 m air pistol	576	15	—N/a		Did not advance	
Anton Gourianov	50 m pistol	554	9	—N/a		Did not advance	
Vitaly Fokeev	Double trap	142	2 Q	29	2 Q	29	1st place, gold medalist(s)
Vladimir Isakov	50 m pistol	554	10	—N/a		Did not advance	
Sergey Kamenskiy	50 m rifle 3 positions	1154	6 Q	—N/a		434.3	4
Sergey Kamenskiy	50 m rifle prone	612.2	23	—N/a		Did not advance	
Alexei Klimov	25 m rapid fire pistol	585	2 Q	—N/a		29	2nd place, silver medalist(s)
Sergei Kruglov	10 m air rifle	626.7	7 Q	—N/a		122.6	6
Nazar Louginets	10 m air rifle	621.0	23	—N/a		Did not advance	
Nazar Louginets	50 m rifle 3 positions	1152	9	—N/a		Did not advance	
Vasily Mosin	Double trap	137	12	Did not advance			
Valeriy Shomin	Skeet	120	15	Did not advance			
Fedor Vlasov	50 m rifle prone	611.5	24	—N/a		Did not advance	
Leonid Yekimov	25 m rapid fire pistol	578	10	—N/a		Did not advance	
Alexander Zemlin	Skeet	112	26	Did not advance			
Denis Zotov	Trap	116	13	Did not advance			

Women

Athlete	Event	Qualification		Semifinal		Final	
Athlete	Event	Points	Rank	Points	Rank	Points	Rank
Yuliya Alipova	25 m pistol	583	3 Q	14	3 q	4	4
Tatiana Barsuk	Trap	70+8	5 Q	12+2	4 q	11	4
Yulia Karimova	50 m rifle 3 positions	579	9	—N/a		Did not advance	
Polina Khorosheva	50 m rifle 3 positions	576	17	—N/a		Did not advance	
Ekaterina Korshunova	10 m air pistol	388	3 Q	—N/a		137.7	5
Anastasia Krakhmaleva	Skeet	65	17	Did not advance			
Olga Kuznetsova	10 m air pistol	390	1 Q	—N/a		116.9	6
Anna Mastyanina	25 m pistol	576	14	Did not advance			
Albina Shakirova	Skeet	68	11	Did not advance			
Elena Tkach	Trap	71	4 Q	13	3 q	14	3rd place, bronze medalist(s)
Daria Vdovina	10 m air rifle	416.5	2 Q	—N/a		144.9	5
Anna Zhukova	10 m air rifle	411.6	23	—N/a		Did not advance	

Mixed team

Athlete	Event	Qualification		Semifinal		Final / BM	
Athlete	Event	Points	Rank	Points	Rank	Opposition Result	Rank
Sergei Kruglov; Daria Vdovina	10 m air rifle	522.4	1 Q	247.5	3 q	Stefanović / Arsović (SRB); W 5–4	3rd place, bronze medalist(s)
Vladimir Gontcharov; Ekaterina Korshunova	10 m air pistol	479	3 Q	236.3	3 q	Carrera / Franquet (ESP); W 5–4	3rd place, bronze medalist(s)
Aleksey Alipov; Elena Tkach	Trap	90	3 Q	24	1 Q	Varga / Štefečeková (SVK); L 21–27	2nd place, silver medalist(s)
Valeriy Shomin; Anastasia Krakhmaleva	Skeet	90+1	7	Did not advance			

== Swimming ==
Russia has qualified 35 athletes.

Men

Athlete	Event	Heat		Semifinal		Final	
Athlete	Event	Time	Rank	Time	Rank	Time	Rank
Daniil Antipov	100 m butterfly	53.59	3 Q	53.67	3 Q	53.36	3rd place, bronze medalist(s)
Daniil Antipov	200 m butterfly	2:00.32	3 Q	1:59.67	4 Q	1:59.88	=4
Igor Balyberdin	200 m individual medley	2:04.62	=12	Did not advance			
Igor Balyberdin	400 m individual medley	4:24.53	2 Q	—N/a		4:20.80	2nd place, silver medalist(s)
Aleksei Brianskiy	50 m freestyle	23.06	5 Q	22.76	3 q	22.69	3rd place, bronze medalist(s)
Aleksei Brianskiy	100 m freestyle	50.91	9 Q	50.70	8 q	50.28	4
Anton Chupkov	50 m breaststroke	28.44	7 Q	28.21	4 Q	28.29	6
Anton Chupkov	100 m breaststroke	1:00.94	1 Q	1:00.95	1 Q	1:00.65	1st place, gold medalist(s)
Anton Chupkov	200 m breaststroke	2:11.52	1 Q	2:10.69	1 Q	2:10.85	1st place, gold medalist(s)
Anton Chupkov	200 m individual medley	2:02.85	3 Q	Withdrew		Did not advance	
Evgenii Drobotov	400 m freestyle	4:03.58	38	Did not advance			
Ilia Druzhinin	400 m freestyle	4:05.16	41	Did not advance			
Ilia Druzhinin	800 m freestyle	—N/a				8:08.36	8
Ilia Druzhinin	1500 m freestyle	—N/a				15:26.33	4
Arkadii Grigorev	50 m breaststroke	28.85	12	Did not advance			
Arkadii Grigorev	100 m breaststroke	1:02.69	7	Did not advance			
Arkadii Grigorev	200 m breaststroke	2:14.29	4	Did not advance			
Georg Gutmann	50 m freestyle	23.20	9 Q	23.02	9	Did not advance	
Georg Gutmann	100 m freestyle	51.11	=16	Did not advance			
Vladislav Kozlov	50 m butterfly	24.23	4	Did not advance			
Vladislav Kozlov	100 m freestyle	50.93	=10 Q	50.33	4 Q	50.11	3rd place, bronze medalist(s)
Roman Larin	50 m backstroke	26.39	11 Q	Withdrew		Did not advance	
Roman Larin	100 m backstroke	56.09	6 Q	55.82	10	Did not advance	
Roman Larin	200 m backstroke	2:01.00	2 Q	2:01.24	5 Q	1:59.60	3rd place, bronze medalist(s)
Ernest Maksumov	400 m freestyle	3:54.77	3 Q	—N/a		3:52.65	3rd place, bronze medalist(s)
Ernest Maksumov	800 m freestyle	—N/a				8:04.72	5
Ernest Maksumov	1500 m freestyle	—N/a				15:13.90	2nd place, silver medalist(s)
Kirill Mordashev	50 m breaststroke	29.32	=23	Did not advance			
Kirill Mordashev	100 m breaststroke	1:03.13	10	Did not advance			
Kirill Mordashev	200 m breaststroke	2:13.20	3 Q	2:13.29	2 Q	2:12.94	2nd place, silver medalist(s)
Daniil Pakhomov	50 m butterfly	24.20	3 Q	24.07	4 Q	24.02	3rd place, bronze medalist(s)
Daniil Pakhomov	100 m butterfly	52.25	1 Q	52.13	1 Q	52.72	1st place, gold medalist(s)
Daniil Pakhomov	200 m butterfly	2:00.11	2 Q	1:57.74	1 Q	1:57.04	1st place, gold medalist(s)
Aleksandr Prokofev	200 m freestyle	1:50.27	5	Did not advance			
Aleksandr Prokofev	400 m freestyle	3:55.97	11 Q	—N/a		3:54.51	6
Igor Shadrin	200 m freestyle	1:52.80	21	Did not advance			
Roman Shevliakov	50 m butterfly	24.10	1 Q	24.11	5 Q	24.05	4
Roman Shevliakov	100 m butterfly	53.75	4	Did not advance			
Roman Shevliakov	200 m butterfly	2:01.07	4	Did not advance			
Filipp Shopin	50 m backstroke	25.79	2 Q	25.67	1 Q	25.40	1st place, gold medalist(s)
Filipp Shopin	100 m backstroke	56.13	7 Q	55.18	3 Q	54.81	2nd place, silver medalist(s)
Nikolay Snegirev	100 m backstroke	57.46	25	Did not advance			
Nikolay Snegirev	200 m freestyle	1:50.22	4 Q	1:49.57	3 Q	1:49.83	4
Nikolay Sokolov	200 m individual medley	2:04.03	8 Q	2:04.27	11	Did not advance	
Nikolay Sokolov	400 m individual medley	4:24.22	1 Q	—N/a		4:19.44	1st place, gold medalist(s)
Elisei Stepanov	50 m freestyle	DNS		Did not advance			
Elisei Stepanov	200 m freestyle	1:49.29	1 Q	1:49.43	1 Q	1:49.64	3rd place, bronze medalist(s)
Egor Suchkov	50 m breaststroke	28.43	6 Q	28.67	11	Did not advance	
Egor Suchkov	100 m breaststroke	1:02.31	5 Q	1:02.15	4 q	1:02.26	5
Egor Suchkov	200 m breaststroke	2:14.58	5	Did not advance			
Sergei Sudakov	50 m freestyle	23.86	35	Did not advance			
Sergei Sudakov	100 m freestyle	51.92	37	Did not advance			
Kirill Titov	50 m backstroke	26.60	15	Did not advance			
Kirill Titov	100 m backstroke	56.89	15	Did not advance			
Kirill Titov	200 m backstroke	2:04.03	14 Q	2:03.43	14	Did not advance	
Mikhail Vekovishchev	50 m butterfly	25.02	23	Did not advance			
Mikhail Vekovishchev	100 m butterfly	56.19	27	Did not advance			
Mikhail Vekovishchev	200 m butterfly	2:09.79	31	Did not advance			
Aleksei Brianskiy; Georg Gutmann*; Vladislav Kozlov; Igor Shadrin; Elisei Stepanov; Sergei Sudakov*	4 × 100 m freestyle relay	3:23.08	3 Q	—N/a		3:20.22	3rd place, bronze medalist(s)
Daniil Antipov*; Ernest Maksumov; Aleksandr Prokofev; Igor Shadrin*; Nikolay Snegirev; Elisei Stepanov	4 × 200 m freestyle relay	7:25.47	1 Q	—N/a		7:16.08	1st place, gold medalist(s)
Daniil Antipov*; Aleksei Brianskiy*; Anton Chupkov; Vladislav Kozlov; Roman Larin*; Daniil Pakhomov; Filip Shopin; Egor Suchkov*	4 × 100 m medley relay	3:42.30	1 Q	—N/a		3:36.38	1st place, gold medalist(s)

Women

Athlete	Event	Heat		Semifinal		Final	
Athlete	Event	Time	Rank	Time	Rank	Time	Rank
Maria Astashkina	50 m breaststroke	31.84	1 Q	31.47	1 Q	31.58	1st place, gold medalist(s)
Maria Astashkina	100 m breaststroke	1:08.67	1 Q	1:07.88	1 Q	1:07.71	1st place, gold medalist(s)
Maria Astashkina	200 m breaststroke	2:25.54	1 Q	2:23.88	1 Q	2:23.06	1st place, gold medalist(s)
Vasilissa Buinaia	50 m freestyle	26.03	4 Q	25.86	4 Q	DSQ	
Vasilissa Buinaia	100 m freestyle	57.74	19	Did not advance			
Olesia Cherniatina	50 m freestyle	26.88	22	Did not advance			
Olesia Cherniatina	100 m freestyle	57.99	=21	Did not advance			
Olesia Cherniatina	200 m freestyle	2:04.74	15	Did not advance			
Alexandra Chesnokova	50 m butterfly	28.16	=14 Q	28.13	=15	Did not advance	
Alexandra Chesnokova	100 m butterfly	1:01.13	5 Q	1:00.63	5 q	1:00.81	7
Alexandra Chesnokova	200 m butterfly	2:17.81	12 Q	2:16.69	11	Did not advance	
Daria Chikunova	50 m breaststroke	32.73	12 Q	32.47	11	Did not advance	
Daria Chikunova	100 m breaststroke	1:09.60	2 Q	1:09.65	3 Q	1:09.02	3rd place, bronze medalist(s)
Daria Chikunova	200 m breaststroke	2:28.94	4 Q	2:28.01	3 Q	2:28.50	4
Polina Egorova	50 m backstroke	29.08	5 Q	29.29	=6 q	29.41	7
Polina Egorova	100 m backstroke	1:02.10	2 Q	1:01.97	2 Q	1:01.19	1st place, gold medalist(s)
Polina Egorova	200 m backstroke	2:13.83	2 Q	2:13.19	3 Q	2:11.23	1st place, gold medalist(s)
Polina Egorova	50 m butterfly	27.38	1 Q	27.15	1 Q	26.82	1st place, gold medalist(s)
Polina Egorova	100 m butterfly	1:00.36	1 Q	59.67	1 Q	59.36	1st place, gold medalist(s)
Mariia Kameneva	50 m freestyle	25.64	2 Q	25.44	1 Q	25.23	1st place, gold medalist(s)
Mariia Kameneva	100 m freestyle	55.94	3 Q	55.37	3 Q	55.19	3rd place, bronze medalist(s)
Mariia Kameneva	50 m backstroke	28.96	3 Q	28.94	3 Q	28.77	3rd place, bronze medalist(s)
Mariia Kameneva	100 m backstroke	1:01.86	1 Q	1:01.57	1 Q	1:01.23	2nd place, silver medalist(s)
Anastasiia Kirpichnikova	200 m freestyle	2:03.69	8 Q	2:02.10	5 q	2:01.98	5
Anastasiia Kirpichnikova	400 m freestyle	4:15.68	2 Q	—N/a		4:13.13	3rd place, bronze medalist(s)
Anastasiia Kirpichnikova	800 m freestyle	—N/a				8:39.73	2nd place, silver medalist(s)
Irina Krivonogova	200 m freestyle	2:05.05	17	Did not advance			
Irina Krivonogova	400 m freestyle	4:21.64	12	Did not advance			
Irina Krivonogova	400 m individual medley	4:55.99	8 Q	—N/a		4:54.09	6
Arina Openysheva	100 m freestyle	55.18	=1 Q	55.26	2 Q	54.45	2nd place, silver medalist(s)
Arina Openysheva	200 m freestyle	2:02.06	1 Q	1:59.42	1 Q	1:58.22	1st place, gold medalist(s)
Arina Openysheva	400 m freestyle	4:14.95	1 Q	—N/a		4:08.81	1st place, gold medalist(s)
Mariana Petrova	400 m freestyle	4:26.88	=23	Did not advance			
Mariana Petrova	800 m freestyle	—N/a				8:59.44	12
Mariana Petrova	1500 m freestyle	—N/a				17:07.52	7
Vasilissa Buinaia; Olesia Cherniatina; Polina Egorova*; Mariia Kameneva; Anastasia Kirpichnikova*; Arina Openysheva	4 × 100 m freestyle relay	3:47.65	1 Q	—N/a		3:43.63	1st place, gold medalist(s)
Olesia Cherniatina; Mariia Kameneva*; Anastasia Kirpichnikova; Irina Krivonogova; Arina Openysheva; Mariana Petrova*	4 × 200 m freestyle relay	8:22.43	6 Q	—N/a		8:03.45	1st place, gold medalist(s)
Maria Astashkina; Vasilissa Buinaia*; Alexandra Chesnokova*; Daria Chikunova*; Polina Egorova; Mariia Kameneva; Arina Openysheva	4 × 100 m medley relay	4:09.96	1 Q	—N/a		4:03.22	1st place, gold medalist(s)

Mixed

Athlete	Event	Heat		Semifinal		Final	
Athlete	Event	Time	Rank	Time	Rank	Time	Rank
Aleksei Brianskiy*; Vasilissa Buinaia*; Olesia Cherniatina*; Mariia Kameneva; Vladislav Kozlov; Arina Openysheva; Igor Shadrin*; Elisei Stepanov	4 × 100 m freestyle relay	3:36.36	2 Q	—N/a		3:30.30	1st place, gold medalist(s)
Vasilissa Buinaia*; Daria Chikunova*; Anton Chupkov; Mariia Kameneva; Daniil Pakhomov; Arina Openysheva; Roman Shevliakov*; Filip Shopin*	4 × 100 m medley relay	3:56.14	1 Q	—N/a		3:49.53	1st place, gold medalist(s)

== Synchronised swimming ==
Athlete	Event	Qualification				Final		
Athlete	Event	Free Routine	Figures	Total	Rank	Free Routine	Total	Rank
Anisiya Neborako	Solo	89.1333	80.9591	170.0924	1 Q	90.0333	170.9924	1st place, gold medalist(s)
Valeriya Filenkova; Daria Kulagina	Duet	89.2333	79.7568	168.9901	1 Q	89.3000	169.0568	1st place, gold medalist(s)
Valeriya Filenkova; Mayya Gurbanberdieva; Veronika Kalinina; Daria Kulagina; Anna Larkina; Anisiya Neborako; Mariia Nemchinova; Maria Salmina; Anastasiia Arkhipovskaia^{Res} Elizaveta Ovchinnikova^{Res}	Team	89.9333	78.3659	168.2992	1 Q	90.7333	169.0992	1st place, gold medalist(s)
Anastasiia Arkhipovskaia; Valeriya Filenkova; Mayya Gurbanberdieva; Veronika Kalinina; Daria Kulagina; Anna Larkina; Anisiya Neborako; Mariia Nemchinova; Elizaveta Ovchinnikova; Maria Salmina	Free combination	—N/a		89.0000	1 Q	—N/a	90.2333	1st place, gold medalist(s)

== Table tennis ==
Russia has qualified six athletes for the table tennis events.

Athlete	Event	Round 1	Round 2	Round of 16	Quarterfinals	Semifinals	Final / BM	
Athlete	Event	Opposition Result	Opposition Result	Opposition Result	Opposition Result	Opposition Result	Opposition Result	Rank
Alexander Shibaev	Men's singles	Bye	Gerell (SWE); L 3–4	Did not advance				
Kirill Skachkov	Men's singles	Saive (BEL); W 1–4	Did not advance					
Alexey Liventsov; Alexander Shibaev; Kirill Skachkov	Men's team	—N/a		Hungary; W 3–0	Austria; L 0–3	Did not advance		
Polina Mikhaylova	Women's singles	Bye	Han (GER); L 0–4	Did not advance				
Yana Noskova	Women's singles	Moret (SUI); W 4–1	Li (NED); L 3–4	Did not advance				
Polina Mikhaylova; Yana Noskova; Anna Tikhomirova	Women's team	—N/a		Portugal; W 3–1	Germany; L 0–3	Did not advance		

== Taekwondo ==
Russia has qualified eight athletes.

Athlete	Event	Round of 16	Quarterfinals	Semifinals	Repechage	Final / BM	
Athlete	Event	Opposition Result	Opposition Result	Opposition Result	Opposition Result	Opposition Result	Rank
Arman Irgaliev	Men's −58 kg	Simitsis (GRE); W 11–2	Tuncat (GER); L 2–5	Did not advance			
Aleksey Denisenko	Men's −68 kg	Ceccaroni (SMR); W 19–1	Stamper (GBR); W 18–6	Taghizade (AZE); L 5–7	Bye	Tazegül (TUR); W 19–16	3rd place, bronze medalist(s)
Albert Gaun	Men's −80 kg	Ordemann (NOR); W 12–5	Yeremyan (ARM); W 5–2	Botta (ITA); W 6–5	Bye	Beigi (AZE); L 4–9	2nd place, silver medalist(s)
Vladislav Larin	Men's +80 kg	Ros (ESP); W 16–2	Roșeanu (ROM); W 20–1	Golec (CRO); W 8–0	Bye	Isayev (AZE); L 3–4	2nd place, silver medalist(s)
Alexandra Lychagina	Women's −49 kg	Abakarova (AZE); L 1–7	Did not advance				
Kristina Kim	Women's −57 kg	Zaninović (CRO); L 3–9	Did not advance		Gladovic (SRB); L WO	Did not advance	
Anastasia Baryshnikova	Women's −67 kg	Tetereviatnykova (UKR); W 6–4	Krzemieniecka (POL); W 11–3	Niare (FRA); W 11–3	Bye	Azizova (AZE); W 6–5	1st place, gold medalist(s)
Olga Ivanova	Women's +67 kg	Schneider (GER); W 5–4	Epanque (FRA); L 3–7	Did not advance	Rajher (SLO); W 2–1	Konieva (UKR); W 7–3	3rd place, bronze medalist(s)

== Triathlon ==
Athlete	Event	Swim (1.5 km)	Trans 1	Bike (40 km)	Trans 2	Run (9.945 km)	Total Time	Rank
Alexander Bryukhankov	Men's	19:24	0:45	57:46	0:27	31:20	1:49:42	7
Dmitry Polyanski	Men's	18:43	0:48	58:25	0:25	Did not finish		
Igor Polyanski	Men's	18:46	0:47	58:21	0:28	37:13	1:55:35	38
Anastasia Abrosimova	Women's	20:16	0:53	1:06:50	0:28	37:20	2:05:47	16
Elena Danilova	Women's	21:54	0:51	1:05:10	0:31	36:54	2:05:20	14
Alexandra Razarenova	Women's	22:05	0:51	1:05:02	0:25	35:37	2:04:00	7

== Volleyball ==
=== Beach ===
Athlete	Event	Preliminary round		Round of 24	Round of 16	Quarterfinals	Semifinals	Final / BM	
Athlete	Event	Opposition Score	Rank	Opposition Score	Opposition Score	Opposition Result	Opposition Result	Opposition Result	Rank
Dmitri Barsuk; Yaroslav Koshkarev	Men's	Özbek – Göğtepe (TUR); W (21–10, 21–13); Kildegaard – Abell (DEN); W (21–18, 21–16); Salvetti – Daguerre (FRA); L (15–21, 20–22)	2 q	Romano – Gritsai (AZE); W (17–21, 21–17, 15–12)	P. Ingrosso – M. Ingrosso (ITA); W (22–20, 15–21, 15–6)	Kavalenka – Dziadkoul (BLR); W (21–19, 28–26)	Kissling – Strasser (SUI); W (21–18, 29–27)	Pļaviņš – Regža (LAT); L (16–21, 21–18, 10–15)	2nd place, silver medalist(s)
Yulia Abalakina; Ksenia Dabizha	Women's	Eiholzer – Betschart (SUI); L (21–17, 19–21, 12–15); Braakman – Sinnema (NED); L (21–18, 15–21, 13–15); Trans – Søndergård (DEN); W (21–13, 21–11)	3 q	Plesiutschnig – Schützenhöfer (AUT); L (13–21, 14–21)	Did not advance				
Maria Prokopeva; Ekaterina Syrtceva	Women's	Baran – Gruszczyńska (POL); W (21–19, 21–17); Longuet – Adelin (FRA); L (13–21, 14–21); In. Makhno – Ir. Makhno (UKR); W (21–13, 21–14)	2 q	Kongshavn – Kjølberg (NOR); W (21–10, 21–18)	Lehtonen – Lahti (FIN); W (21–18, 21–17)	Plesiutschnig – Schützenhöfer (AUT); L (21–16, 13–21, 12–15)	Did not advance		

=== Indoor ===
Summary

Athlete	Event	Preliminary round						Quarterfinals	Semifinals	Final / BM	
Athlete	Event	Opposition Score	Opposition Score	Opposition Score	Opposition Score	Opposition Score	Rank	Opposition Result	Opposition Result	Opposition Result	Rank
Russia men's	Men's tournament	Germany; W 3–1	Belgium; W 3–0	Slovakia; W 3–1	Bulgaria; L 1–3	Italy; W 3–0	2 Q	France; W 3–0	Germany; L 1–3	Poland; W 3–1	3rd place, bronze medalist(s)
Russia women's	Women's tournament	Netherlands; L 1–3	Bulgaria; L 1–3	Croatia; W 3–0	Germany; W 3–2	Serbia; L 0–3	4 Q	Turkey; L 1–3	Did not advance		

== Water polo ==
=== Summary ===
Athlete	Event	Preliminary round						Playoffs	Quarterfinals	Semifinals / PM	Final / BM / PM	
Athlete	Event	Opposition Score	Opposition Score	Opposition Score	Opposition Score	Opposition Score	Rank	Opposition Result	Opposition Result	Opposition Result	Opposition Result	Rank
Russia men's	Men's tournament	Ukraine; W 20–7	Italy; L 8–9	France; W 15–6	—N/a		2 q	Montenegro; W 11–8	Spain; L 9–14	Germany; W 16–9	Italy; L 6–11	6
Russia women's	Women's tournament	Slovakia; W 13–4	France; W 25–3	Spain; W 12–8	Italy; D 11–11	Serbia; L 28–3	1 Q	—N/a	Bye	Italy; W 17–7	Spain; W 17–16 (PSO)	1st place, gold medalist(s)

=== Men's tournament ===
Preliminary round

Pos	Team	Pld	W	D	L	GF	GA	GD	Pts	Qualification
1	Italy	3	3	0	0	39	19	+20	9	Quarterfinals
2	Russia	3	2	0	1	42	22	+20	6	Playoffs
3	France	3	1	0	2	23	29	−6	3	Playoffs
4	Ukraine	3	0	0	3	16	50	−34	0	13–16th place semifinals

Source: Baku 2015

13 June 2015; 15:00	Report	Russia	20–7	Ukraine	Water Polo Arena, Baku; Referees: Miodrag Stefanović (SRB); Matan Schwartz (ISR)
13 June 2015; 15:00	Report	Score by quarters: 5–0, 2–2, 6–3, 7–2			Water Polo Arena, Baku; Referees: Miodrag Stefanović (SRB); Matan Schwartz (ISR)
13 June 2015; 15:00	Report	Krug 5	Goals	Dzyadyk, Leshchenko 2	Water Polo Arena, Baku; Referees: Miodrag Stefanović (SRB); Matan Schwartz (ISR)

14 June 2015; 20:30	Report	Italy	9–8	Russia	Water Polo Arena, Baku; Referees: Juan Colominas (ESP); Radu Matache (ROU)
14 June 2015; 20:30	Report	Score by quarters: 3–2, 2–0, 4–1, 0–5			Water Polo Arena, Baku; Referees: Juan Colominas (ESP); Radu Matache (ROU)
14 June 2015; 20:30	Report	Del Basso 4	Goals	Zinnurov 4	Water Polo Arena, Baku; Referees: Juan Colominas (ESP); Radu Matache (ROU)

15 June 2015; 16:45	Report	Russia	14–6	France	Water Polo Arena, Baku; Referees: Ivan Raković (SRB); Gábor Vogel (HUN)
15 June 2015; 16:45	Report	Score by quarters: 5–2, 2–3, 4–1, 3–0			Water Polo Arena, Baku; Referees: Ivan Raković (SRB); Gábor Vogel (HUN)
15 June 2015; 16:45	Report	Salimov 3	Goals	Marion-Vernoux 2	Water Polo Arena, Baku; Referees: Ivan Raković (SRB); Gábor Vogel (HUN)

Playoff

16 June 2015; 14:15	Report	Russia	11–8	Montenegro	Water Polo Arena, Baku; Referees: Spyridon Achladiotis (GRE); Cornelis van der Loo (NED)
16 June 2015; 14:15	Report	Score by quarters: 4–2, 1–1, 3–4, 3–1			Water Polo Arena, Baku; Referees: Spyridon Achladiotis (GRE); Cornelis van der Loo (NED)
16 June 2015; 14:15	Report	four players 2	Goals	Saveljić 3	Water Polo Arena, Baku; Referees: Spyridon Achladiotis (GRE); Cornelis van der Loo (NED)

Quarterfinal

17 June 2015; 14:15	Report	Russia	9–14	Spain	Water Polo Arena, Baku; Referees: Gábor Vogel (HUN); Cornelis van der Loo (NED)
17 June 2015; 14:15	Report	Score by quarters: 4–3, 2–2, 2–6, 1–3			Water Polo Arena, Baku; Referees: Gábor Vogel (HUN); Cornelis van der Loo (NED)
17 June 2015; 14:15	Report	Egorov 3	Goals	Granados 4	Water Polo Arena, Baku; Referees: Gábor Vogel (HUN); Cornelis van der Loo (NED)

5–8th place semifinal

19 June 2015; 15:00	Report	Russia	16–9	Germany	Water Polo Arena, Baku; Referees: Konstantinos Kyranis (GRE); Brian Littlejohn (GBR)
19 June 2015; 15:00	Report	Score by quarters: 3–2, 4–1, 5–4, 4–2			Water Polo Arena, Baku; Referees: Konstantinos Kyranis (GRE); Brian Littlejohn (GBR)
19 June 2015; 15:00	Report	Pronin 3	Goals	Manolakis 4	Water Polo Arena, Baku; Referees: Konstantinos Kyranis (GRE); Brian Littlejohn (GBR)

Fifth place game

21 June 2015; 14:30	Report	Russia	6–11	Italy	Water Polo Arena, Baku; Referees: Matan Schwartz (ISR); Spyridon Achladiotis (GRE)
21 June 2015; 14:30	Report	Score by quarters: 3–2, 0–3, 1–4, 2–2			Water Polo Arena, Baku; Referees: Matan Schwartz (ISR); Spyridon Achladiotis (GRE)
21 June 2015; 14:30	Report	six players 1	Goals	four players 2	Water Polo Arena, Baku; Referees: Matan Schwartz (ISR); Spyridon Achladiotis (GRE)

=== Women's tournament ===
Preliminary round

Pos	Team	Pld	W	D	L	GF	GA	GD	Pts	Qualification
1	Russia	5	4	1	0	89	29	+60	13	Semifinals
2	Spain	5	4	0	1	75	33	+42	12	Quarterfinals
3	Italy	5	3	1	1	76	37	+39	10	Quarterfinals
4	Slovakia	5	2	0	3	33	64	−31	6	7–10th place semifinals
5	France	5	1	0	4	27	83	−56	3	7–12th place quarterfinals
6	Serbia	5	0	0	5	26	80	−54	0	7–12th place quarterfinals

Source: Baku 2015

12 June 2015; 15:30	Report	Russia	13–4	Slovakia	Water Polo Arena, Baku; Referees: Brian Littlejohn (GBR); Gabriella Várkonyi (HUN)
12 June 2015; 15:30	Report	Score by quarters: 2–1, 3–1, 4–2, 4–0			Water Polo Arena, Baku; Referees: Brian Littlejohn (GBR); Gabriella Várkonyi (HUN)
12 June 2015; 15:30	Report	Bersneva, Khamzaeva 3	Goals	Stankovianska 2	Water Polo Arena, Baku; Referees: Brian Littlejohn (GBR); Gabriella Várkonyi (HUN)

13 June 2015; 11:15	Report	France	3–25	Russia	Water Polo Arena, Baku; Referees: Massimo Angileri (MLT); Cornelis van der Loo (NED)
13 June 2015; 11:15	Report	Score by quarters: 0–4, 1–8, 1–8, 1–5			Water Polo Arena, Baku; Referees: Massimo Angileri (MLT); Cornelis van der Loo (NED)
13 June 2015; 11:15	Report	Le Roux 2	Goals	Bersneva, Fedotova 6	Water Polo Arena, Baku; Referees: Massimo Angileri (MLT); Cornelis van der Loo (NED)

14 June 2015; 18:45	Report	Russia	12–8	Spain	Water Polo Arena, Baku; Referees: Konstantinos Kyranis (GRE); Gábor Vogel (HUN)
14 June 2015; 18:45	Report	Score by quarters: 3–1, 3–2, 2–3 , 4–2			Water Polo Arena, Baku; Referees: Konstantinos Kyranis (GRE); Gábor Vogel (HUN)
14 June 2015; 18:45	Report	three players 3	Goals	Aznar, Roldán 2	Water Polo Arena, Baku; Referees: Konstantinos Kyranis (GRE); Gábor Vogel (HUN)

15 June 2015; 18:45	Report	Italy	11–11	Russia	Water Polo Arena, Baku; Referees: Vlaho Radičević (CRO); Matan Schwartz (ISR)
15 June 2015; 18:45	Report	Score by quarters: 3–3, 2–4, 3–2, 3–2			Water Polo Arena, Baku; Referees: Vlaho Radičević (CRO); Matan Schwartz (ISR)
15 June 2015; 18:45	Report	Picozzi 6	Goals	Gerzanich 3	Water Polo Arena, Baku; Referees: Vlaho Radičević (CRO); Matan Schwartz (ISR)

16 June 2015; 16:00	Report	Russia	28–3	Serbia	Water Polo Arena, Baku; Referees: Erkan Türkkan (TUR); Massimo Angileri (MLT)
16 June 2015; 16:00	Report	Score by quarters: 9–1, 7–1, 9–0, 3–1			Water Polo Arena, Baku; Referees: Erkan Türkkan (TUR); Massimo Angileri (MLT)
16 June 2015; 16:00	Report	Khamzaeva 6	Goals	Damnjanović 2	Water Polo Arena, Baku; Referees: Erkan Türkkan (TUR); Massimo Angileri (MLT)

Semifinal

18 June 2015; 20:00	Report	Spain	9–6	Greece	Water Polo Arena, Baku; Referees: Ivan Raković (SRB); Mark Koganov (AZE)
18 June 2015; 20:00	Report	Score by quarters: 2–2, 3–2, 2–1, 2–1			Water Polo Arena, Baku; Referees: Ivan Raković (SRB); Mark Koganov (AZE)
18 June 2015; 20:00	Report	Aznar 4	Goals	Mavrota, Protopapas 2	Water Polo Arena, Baku; Referees: Ivan Raković (SRB); Mark Koganov (AZE)

Final

20 June 2015; 19:30	Report	(gold) Russia	17–16 (PSO)	Spain (silver)	Water Polo Arena, Baku; Referees: Gabriella Várkonyi (HUN); Vlaho Radičević (CRO)
20 June 2015; 19:30	Report	Score by quarters: 3–3, 1–2, 2–3, 4–2 PSO: 7–6			Water Polo Arena, Baku; Referees: Gabriella Várkonyi (HUN); Vlaho Radičević (CRO)
20 June 2015; 19:30	Report	Gerzanich 3	Goals	Aznar 3	Water Polo Arena, Baku; Referees: Gabriella Várkonyi (HUN); Vlaho Radičević (CRO)

== Wrestling ==
Key:

- PO – Victory by points – the loser without technical points
- PP – Victory by points – the loser with technical points
- SP – Victory by technical superiority – the loser with technical points and a margin of victory of at least 8 (Greco-Roman) or 10 (freestyle) points
- ST – Victory by technical superiority – the loser without technical points and a margin of victory of at least 8 (Greco-Roman) or 10 (freestyle) points
- VB – Victory by injury
- VT – Victory by fall

Men's freestyle

Athlete	Event	Qualification	Round of 16	Quarterfinal	Semifinal	Repechage 1	Repechage 2	Final / BM	
Athlete	Event	Opposition Result	Opposition Result	Opposition Result	Opposition Result	Opposition Result	Opposition Result	Opposition Result	Rank
Viktor Lebedev	−57 kg	Bye	Markovych (UKR); W 10–0 ^{ST}	Akgul (TUR); W 6–3 ^{PP}	Aliyev (AZE); W 3–1 ^{PP}	—N/a	Bye	Ewald (GER); W 8–0 ^{PO}	1st place, gold medalist(s)
Aleksandr Bogomoev	−61 kg	—N/a	Bye	Aktaş (TUR); W 4–0 ^{PO}	Aliyev (AZE); W 5–2 ^{PP}	—N/a	Bye	Lomtadze (GEO); W 13–8 ^{PP}	1st place, gold medalist(s)
Ilyas Bekbulatov	−65 kg	Asgarov (AZE); L 7–8 ^{PP}	Did not advance			Sava (MDA); W 16–6 ^{SP}	Fiquet (FRA); W 12–2 ^{SP}	Nurykau (BLR); W 4–1 ^{PP}	3rd place, bronze medalist(s)
Magomedrasul Gazimagomedov	−70 kg	Bye	Efendiev (SRB); W 8–2 ^{PP}	Nedealco (MDA); W 5–0 ^{PO}	Gör (TUR); W 6–0 ^{PO}	Bye		Gadzhiev (POL); W 2–1 ^{PP}	1st place, gold medalist(s)
Aniuar Geduev	−74 kg	Shabanau (BLR); W 6–0 ^{PO}	Savvoulidis (GRE); W 4–0 ^{PO}	Khadjiev (FRA); W 10–0 ^{ST}	Kvelashvili (GEO); W 8–0 ^{VT}	Bye		Demirtaş (TUR); W 10–0 ^{ST}	1st place, gold medalist(s)
Abdulrashid Sadulaev	−86 kg	Bye	Zuz (ITA); W 10–0 ^{ST}	Qadjiyev (AZE); W 11–1 ^{SP}	Marcinkiewicz (POL); W 10–0 ^{ST}	Bye		Ianulov (MDA); W 11–0 ^{ST}	1st place, gold medalist(s)
Abdusalam Gadisov	−97 kg	Bye	Shala (KOS); W 11–0 ^{ST}	Lagodskis (LAT); W 10–0 ^{ST}	Gazyumov (AZE); L 2–4 ^{PP}	Bye		Baran (POL); W 4–0 ^{PO}	3rd place, bronze medalist(s)
Khadzhimurat Gatsalov	−125 kg	Bye	Berianidze (ARM); L 2–7 ^{PP}	Did not advance					

Men's Greco-Roman

Athlete	Event	Qualification	Round of 16	Quarterfinal	Semifinal	Repechage 1	Repechage 2	Final / BM	
Athlete	Event	Opposition Result	Opposition Result	Opposition Result	Opposition Result	Opposition Result	Opposition Result	Opposition Result	Rank
Stepan Maryanyan	−59 kg	Bye	Fonnesbek (DEN); W 8–0 ^{ST}	Amoyan (ARM); W 9–0 ^{ST}	Mukhtarov (AZE); W 11–3 ^{SP}	Bye		Daurov (BLR); W 3–0 ^{PO}	1st place, gold medalist(s)
Artem Surkov	−66 kg	Bjerrehuus (DEN); W 9–0 ^{ST}	Harutyunyan (SWE); W 8–0 ^{ST}	Lévai (SVK); W 9–0 ^{ST}	Demyankov (UKR); W 2–0 ^{PO}	Bye		Arutyunyan (ARM); W 2–0 ^{PO}	1st place, gold medalist(s)
Yury Denisov	−71 kg	Bye	Nemeš (SRB); W 6–1 ^{PP}	Tsulukidze (GEO); L 4–4 ^{PP}	Did not advance				
Chingiz Labazanov	−75 kg	Szabó (HUN); W 6–0 ^{PO}	Nikoghosyan (FRA); W 8–0 ^{ST}	Musaliyev (AZE); L 2–4 ^{PP}	Did not advance	Bye	Puscasu (ROU); W 4–0 ^{VT}	Datunashvili (GEO); W 3–2 ^{PP}	3rd place, bronze medalist(s)
Evgeny Saleev	−80 kg	Bye	Shyshman (UKR); W 4–0 ^{PO}	Matuzevičius (LTU); W 9–0 ^{ST}	Sasunouski (BLR); W 12–4 ^{SP}	Bye		Huseynov (AZE); W 2–0 ^{PO}	1st place, gold medalist(s)
Davit Chakvetadze	−85 kg	Bye	Hrustanovic (AUT); W 4–0 ^{PO}	Azizsir (GER); W 8–0 ^{ST}	Žugaj (CRO); W 6–2 ^{PP}	Bye		Beleniuk (UKR); W 3–2 ^{PP}	1st place, gold medalist(s)
Islam Magomedov	−98 kg	Hassler (GER); W 6–0 ^{PO}	Arusaar (EST); W 3–0 ^{PO}	Nuriyev (AZE); W 3–1 ^{PP}	İldem (TUR); W 6–2 ^{PP}	Bye		Timchenko (UKR); W 4–0 ^{PO}	1st place, gold medalist(s)
Sergey Semenov	−130 kg	—N/a	Metodiev (BUL); W 6–0 ^{PO}	Kayaalp (TUR); L 0–3 ^{PO}	Did not advance	—N/a	Lám (HUN); L 0–4 ^{PO}	Did not advance	

Women's freestyle

Athlete	Event	Qualification	Round of 16	Quarterfinal	Semifinal	Repechage	Final / BM	
Athlete	Event	Opposition Result	Opposition Result	Opposition Result	Opposition Result	Opposition Result	Opposition Result	Rank
Valentina Islamova Brik	−48 kg	Bye	Leorda (MDA); W 12–1 ^{VT}	Demirhan (TUR); W 10–0 ^{ST}	Yankova (BUL); L 8–8 ^{PP}	Bye	Schellin (GER); W 11–1 ^{SP}	3rd place, bronze medalist(s)
Natalia Malysheva	−53 kg	Lesaffre (FRA); W 6–0 ^{PO}	Felice (ITA); W 3–3 ^{PP}	Shushko (BLR); L 1–1 ^{PP}	Did not advance			
Irina Ologonova	−55 kg	—N/a	Bye	Hanchar (BLR); W 13–0 ^{VT}	Krawczyk (POL); L 4–6 ^{PP}	Bye	Nikolova (BUL); L 8–8 ^{PP}	5
Valeriia Koblova	−58 kg	—N/a	Cherdivara (MDA); W 8–2 ^{PP}	Barka (HUN); L 0–0 ^{VB}	Did not advance	Bullen (NOR); L 0–0 ^{VB}	Did not advance	
Svetlana Lipatova	−60 kg	—N/a	Bye	Ivanova (BLR); W 12–1 ^{SP}	Blekaitytė (LTU); W 12–0 ^{ST}	Bye	Sastin (HUN); L 0–7 ^{PO}	2nd place, silver medalist(s)
Valeriia Lazinskaia	−63 kg	—N/a	Olli (FIN); W 0–0 ^{VB}	Grigorjeva (LAT); W 4–3 ^{PP}	Johansson (SWE); W 2–2 ^{VT}	Bye	Tkach (UKR); W 5–4 ^{PP}	1st place, gold medalist(s)
Natalia Vorobeva	−69 kg	—N/a	Mushka (AZE); W 7–0 ^{PO}	Wieszczek (POL); W 2–0 ^{VT}	Kratysh (ISR); L 9–11 ^{PP}	Bye	Vryoni (GRE); W 8–0 ^{VT}	3rd place, bronze medalist(s)
Ekaterina Bukina	−75 kg	—N/a	Osocka (POL); W 6–5 ^{VT}	Saenko (MDA); W 9–0 ^{PO}	Adar (TUR); W 14–11 ^{PP}	Bye	Marzaliuk (BLR); L 4–5 ^{PP}	2nd place, silver medalist(s)
