= Kleshchenko =

Kleshchenko (Ukrainian or Russian: Клещенко) is a gender-neutral Ukrainian surname that may refer to

- Aleksandr Kleshchenko (born 1995), Russian football player
- Evgeny Kleshchenko (born 1992), Russian BMX rider
- Nicky Cleșcenco (born 2001), Moldovan football player
- Serghei Cleșcenco (born 1972), Moldovan football player
