= Shooting at the 2015 European Games – Mixed 10 metre air rifle =

Mixed's 10 metre air rifle at the 2015 European Games
- Venue: Baku Shooting Centre
- Date: 22 June
- Competitors: 24 from 12 nations

Medalists
gold medal	Niccolò Campriani; Petra Zublasing	Italy
silver medal	Steffen Olsen; Stine Nielsen	Denmark
bronze medal	Sergey Kruglov; Daria Vdovina	Russia

The Mixed 10 metre air rifle competition at the 2015 European Games in Baku, Azerbaijan was held on 22 June at the Baku Shooting Centre.

== Schedule ==
All times are local (UTC+5).

Date	Time	Event
Monday, 22 June 2015	8:30	Qualification
Monday, 22 June 2015	16:45	Final

== Results ==
Rank	Team	Series					Total	Notes
Rank	Team	1	2	3	4	5	Total	Notes
1	Russia (RUS)	104.7	103.8	104.2	104.2	105.5	522.4	
	Daria Vdovina	52.2	52.0	51.9	52.0	53.2	261.3	
	Sergey Kruglov	52.5	51.8	52.3	52.2	52.3	261.1	
2	Norway (NOR)	103.8	103.3	105.7	103.9	104.7	521.4	
	Malin Westerheim	52.9	51.4	53.6	51.7	52.4	262.0	
	Are Hansen	50.9	51.9	52.1	52.2	52.3	259.4	
3	Denmark (DEN)	103.9	103.6	105.0	103.6	103.9	520.0	
	Stine Nielsen	51.9	51.5	52.3	52.3	51.5	259.5	
	Steffen Olsen	52.0	52.1	52.7	51.3	52.4	260.5	
4	Italy (ITA)	103.7	105.3	104.8	102.5	103.5	519.8	
	Petra Zublasing	51.3	52.0	52.5	50.4	51.7	257.9	
	Niccolò Campriani	52.4	53.3	52.3	52.1	51.8	261.9	
5	Austria (AUT)	103.0	103.6	103.8	103.2	104.9	518.5	
	Stephanie Obermoser	51.2	52.2	52.1	51.0	52.1	258.6	
	Alexander Schmirl	51.8	51.4	51.7	52.2	52.8	259.9	
6	Hungary (HUN)	103.2	104.6	102.7	104.0	103.8	518.3	
	Kata Zwickl-Veres	51.3	52.0	50.9	50.5	51.6	256.3	
	Istvan Peni	51.9	52.6	51.8	53.5	52.2	262.0	
7	Serbia (SRB)	102.8	103.9	102.3	104.6	104.4	518.0	
	Andrea Arsovic	51.0	51.6	51.5	52.1	52.5	258.7	
	Milutin Stefanovic	51.8	52.3	50.8	52.5	51.9	259.3	
8	Croatia (CRO)	102.7	104.0	102.6	101.7	106.3	517.3	
	Snjezana Pejcic	51.8	51.0	50.9	50.3	53.0	257.0	
	Petar Gorsa	50.9	53.0	51.7	51.4	53.3	260.3	
9	Germany (GER)	104.1	104.4	101.9	102.7	104.2	517.3	
	Lisa Mueller	51.5	52.5	50.5	51.9	51.7	258.1	
	Michael Janker	52.6	51.9	51.4	50.8	52.5	259.2	
10	France (FRA)	102.7	103.7	101.7	102.3	103.7	514.1	
	Judith Gomez	50.7	51.8	50.4	49.6	51.6	254.1	
	Pierre Edmond Piasecki	52.0	51.9	51.3	52.7	52.1	260.0	
11	Ukraine (UKR)	102.8	104.9	102.9	102.1	101.1	513.8	
	Olga Golubchenko	51.5	52.7	51.2	50.1	50.5	256.0	
	Oleh Tsarkov	51.3	52.2	51.7	52.0	50.6	257.8	
12	Switzerland (SUI)	103.4	99.9	103.6	102.8	103.6	513.3	
	Jasmin Mischler	52.4	49.8	51.7	50.7	51.8	256.4	
	Pascal Loretan	51.0	50.1	51.9	52.1	51.8	256.9	

=== Semi-final ===
==== Semi-final 1 ====
Rank	Team	Series					Total	Notes
Rank	Team	1	2	3	4	5	Total	Notes
1	Italy (ITA)	61.2	61.3	41.3	40.1	40.1	244.0	
	Petra Zublasing	31.2	31.5	20.8	20.2	20.4	124.1	
	Niccolò Campriani	30.0	29.8	20.5	19.9	19.7	119.9	
2	Serbia (SRB)	60.2	62.2	41.4	39.6	40.4	243.8	
	Andrea Arsovic	30.2	30.8	20.5	20.2	20.0	121.7	
	Milutin Stefanovic	30.0	31.4	20.9	19.4	20.4	122.1	
3	Norway (NOR)	60.3	61.3	41.1	39.2		201.9	
	Malin Westerheim	30.1	31.5	20.8	19.4		101.8	
	Are Hansen	30.2	29.8	20.3	19.8		100.1	
4	Hungary (HUN)	61.7	62.8	35.7			160.2	
	Kata Zwickl-Veres	30.8	31.2	19.4			81.4	
	Istvan Peni	30.9	31.6	16.3			78.8	

==== Semi-final 2 ====
Rank	Team	Series					Total	Notes
Rank	Team	1	2	3	4	5	Total	Notes
1	Denmark (DEN)	62.3	62.4	42.3	40.8	41.6	249.4	
	Stine Nielsen	32.2	30.9	21.4	20.3	21.2	126.0	
	Steffen Olsen	30.1	31.5	20.9	20.5	20.4	123.4	
2	Russia (RUS)	61.8	61.4	41.7	41.0	41.6	247.5	
	Daria Vdovina	31.4	30.6	20.4	20.4	21.4	124.2	
	Sergey Kruglov	30.4	30.8	21.3	20.6	20.2	123.3	
3	Austria (AUT)	61.7	61.5	40.9	40.8		204.9	
	Stephanie Obermoser	30.9	30.6	20.8	20.6		102.9	
	Alexander Schmirl	30.8	30.9	20.1	20.2		102.0	
4	Croatia (CRO)	61.5	61.0	40.6			163.1	
	Snjezana Pejcic	30.5	31.0	20.7			82.2	
	Petar Gorsa	31.0	30.0	19.9			80.9	

=== Finals ===
==== Bronze medal match ====
Rank	Team	Total
3rd place, bronze medalist(s)	Russia (RUS)	5
	Daria Vdovina	
	Sergey Kruglov	
4	Serbia (SRB)	4
	Andrea Arsovic	
	Milutin Stefanovic	

==== Gold medal match ====
Rank	Team	Total
1st place, gold medalist(s)	Italy (ITA)	5
	Petra Zublasing	
	Niccolò Campriani	
2nd place, silver medalist(s)	Denmark (DEN)	3
	Stine Nielsen	
	Steffen Olsen	
