= Shooting at the 2015 European Games – Men's double trap =

Men's shooting event

Men's double trap at the 2015 European Games
- Venue: Baku Shooting Centre
- Date: 19 June
- Competitors: 16 from 11 nations

Medalists
gold medal	Vitaly Fokeev	Russia
silver medal	Richárd Bognár	Hungary
bronze medal	Antonino Barillà	Italy

The men's double trap competition at the 2015 European Games in Baku, Azerbaijan was held on 19 June at the Baku Shooting Centre.

== Schedule ==
All times are local (UTC+5).

Date	Time	Event
Friday, 19 June 2015	10:30	Qualification
Friday, 19 June 2015	16:45	Final

== Results ==
=== Qualification ===
Rank	Athlete	Series					Total	Notes
Rank	Athlete	1	2	3	4	5	Total	Notes
1	Steven Scott (GBR)	29	28	27	28	30	142	GR
2	Vitaly Fokeev (RUS)	29	29	27	29	28	142	GR
3	Antonino Barillà (ITA)	27	29	30	28	28	142	GR
4	Richárd Bognár (HUN)	29	28	28	30	27	142	GR
5	Andreas Löw (GER)	27	29	29	29	27	141	
6	Hubert Olejnik (SVK)	28	28	27	29	28	140	
7	Michael Goldbrunner (GER)	25	30	26	29	29	139	
8	Håkan Dahlby (SWE)	26	29	27	29	28	139	
9	Sami Ritsilä (FIN)	29	29	28	29	24	139	
10	Simo Köylinen (FIN)	28	29	28	26	27	138	
11	Roland Gerebics (HUN)	29	29	28	26	26	138	
12	Vasily Mosin (RUS)	26	29	27	27	28	137	
13	Nathan Lee Xuereb (MLT)	27	29	26	27	28	137	
14	Tim Kneale (GBR)	28	28	27	28	26	137	
15	Davide Gasparini (ITA)	28	28	26	25	29	136	
16	Stefanos Theodotou (CYP)	26	27	27	27	26	133	

=== Semifinal ===
Rank	Athlete	Score	S-off
1	Richárd Bognár (HUN)	30	
2	Vitaly Fokeev (RUS)	29	
3	Andreas Löw (GER)	28	12
4	Antonino Barillà (ITA)	28	12
5	Steven Scott (GBR)	28	11
6	Hubert Andrzejt Olejnik (SVK)	27	

=== Finals ===
==== Bronze medal match ====
Rank	Athlete	Score	S-off
3rd place, bronze medalist(s)	Antonino Barillà (ITA)	29	
4	Andreas Löw (GER)	28	

==== Gold medal match ====
Rank	Athlete	Score	S-off
1st place, gold medalist(s)	Vitaly Fokeev (RUS)	29	
2nd place, silver medalist(s)	Richárd Bognár (HUN)	26	
