= Steffen Olsen =

Danish sport shooter (born 1983)

Steffen H. Olsen
Personal information
- Nationality: Danish
- Born: 30 January 1983 (age 43)
- Height: 1.89 m (6 ft 2 in)
- Weight: 88 kg (194 lb)

Sport
- Country: Denmark
- Sport: Shooting
- Event: Small bore rifle
Medal record
World Championships
Gold medal – first place	2018 Changwon	50 m rifle prone
European Games
Silver medal – second place	2015 Baku	Mixed 10 m air rifle
European Championships
Gold medal – first place	2021 Osijek	300 m rifle 3 positions
Silver medal – second place	2021 Osijek	300 m rifle prone
Bronze medal – third place	2013 Osijek	50 m rifle prone team
Bronze medal – third place	2013 Osijek	300 m rifle prone team
Bronze medal – third place	2022 Wrocław	50 m rifle 3 positions mixed team

Steffen Olsen (born 30 January 1983) is a Danish sport shooter.

He participated at the 2018 ISSF World Shooting Championships, winning a medal.
