= Swimming at the 2015 European Games – Men's 100 metre butterfly =

Men's 100 metre butterfly at the 2015 European Games
- Venue: Aquatic Palace
- Dates: 26–27 June
- Competitors: 56 from 30 nations
- Winning time: 52.72

Medalists
gold medal	Daniil Pakhomov	Russia
silver medal	Alberto Lozano	Spain
bronze medal	Daniil Antipov	Russia

The men's 100 metre butterfly event at the 2015 European Games in Baku took place on 26 and 27 June at the Aquatic Palace.

== Results ==
=== Heats ===
The heats were started on 26 June at 10:41.

Rank	Heat	Lane	Name	Nationality	Time	Notes
1	6	4	Daniil Pakhomov	Russia	52.25	Q, GR
2	6	3	Alberto Lozano	Spain	53.55	Q
3	5	5	Daniil Antipov	Russia	53.59	Q
4	4	4	Roman Shevliakov	Russia	53.75	
5	5	4	Giacomo Carini	Italy	54.06	Q
6	6	2	Artūrs Pesockis	Latvia	54.08	Q
7	6	1	Daniel Zaitsev	Estonia	54.22	Q
8	5	6	Michał Chudy	Poland	54.25	Q
9	6	7	Guillaume Garzotto	France	54.48	Q
10	6	6	Johannes Tesch	Germany	54.57	Q
11	6	5	Filip Milcevic	Austria	54.62	Q
12	5	2	Dries Vangoetsenhoven	Belgium	55.09	Q
13	5	7	Ante Lučev	Croatia	55.10	Q
14	4	3	Paulus Schön	Germany	55.20	Q
15	4	7	Vladimír Štefánik	Slovakia	55.32	Q
16	5	8	Erge Can Gezmiş	Turkey	55.47	Q, WD
17	4	1	Christian Ferraro	Italy	55.55	Q
18	6	0	Matthias Marsau	France	55.68	Q
19	4	6	Enzo Nardozza	Italy	55.71	
19	4	9	Berk Özkul	Turkey	55.71	
21	4	2	Javier Barrena	Spain	55.80	
22	5	1	Illia Pidvalnyi	Ukraine	55.91	
23	6	8	Damian Chrzanowski	Poland	55.96	
24	3	6	Ivan Andrianov	Azerbaijan	56.03	
25	5	0	Niko Mäkelä	Finland	56.07	
26	3	0	Gabriel Lópes	Portugal	56.13	
27	4	5	Mikhail Vekovishchev	Russia	56.19	
28	4	0	Thomas Maurer	Switzerland	56.23	
29	6	9	Markus Malm	Sweden	56.25	
30	3	3	Márk Tekauer	Hungary	56.26	
31	3	1	Paul Hentschel	Germany	56.29	
32	3	7	James Brown	Ireland	56.33	
33	5	3	Dmytro Prozhoha	Ukraine	56.37	
34	3	5	Cevin Siim	Estonia	56.38	
35	3	9	Pavel Bashura	Belarus	56.44	
36	1	7	Akaki Vashakidze	Georgia	56.50	
37	3	4	Kirill Baron	Israel	56.55	
38	2	3	Mateusz Żurawicz	Poland	56.58	
39	1	3	Samet Alkan	Turkey	56.78	
40	3	8	Maximilian Forstenhäusler	Germany	56.79	
41	4	8	Matija Pucarević	Serbia	56.88	
42	2	1	Meiron Cheruti	Israel	57.02	
43	3	2	Michał Brzuś	Poland	57.07	
44	5	9	Henry Kerman	Sweden	57.38	
45	2	8	Nikita Saunonen	Finland	57.57	
46	1	6	Vlas Cononov	Moldova	57.65	
47	2	6	Blaž Demšar	Slovenia	57.89	
48	2	4	Alan Corby	Ireland	57.91	
49	2	2	Ole-Mikal Fløgstad	Norway	57.99	
50	2	0	Nazarii Kosylo	Ukraine	58.02	
51	2	9	Cla Remund	Switzerland	58.13	
52	1	2	Maid Sukanović	Bosnia and Herzegovina	58.22	
53	1	4	Takis Papadopoulos	Cyprus	59.14	
54	2	7	Timothy Schlatter	Switzerland	59.28	
55	1	5	Murat Ayhan	Azerbaijan	1:02.33	
	2	5	Benjamin Doyle	Ireland	DSQ	

=== Semifinals ===
The semifinals were started on 26 June at 17:52.

==== Semifinal 1 ====
Rank	Lane	Name	Nationality	Time	Notes
1	4	Alberto Lozano	Spain	53.23	Q
2	5	Giacomo Carini	Italy	53.79	Q
3	3	Daniel Zaitsev	Estonia	54.05	q
4	6	Guillaume Garzotto	France	54.54	
5	1	Vladimír Štefánik	Slovakia	54.59	
6	7	Ante Lučev	Croatia	54.75	
7	2	Filip Milcevic	Austria	54.76	
8	8	Matthias Marsau	France	55.59	

==== Semifinal 2 ====
Rank	Lane	Name	Nationality	Time	Notes
1	4	Daniil Pakhomov	Russia	52.13	Q, GR
2	5	Daniil Antipov	Russia	53.67	Q
3	6	Michał Chudy	Poland	53.96	q
4	3	Artūrs Pesockis	Latvia	53.99	q
5	7	Dries Vangoetsenhoven	Belgium	54.28	q
6	1	Paulus Schön	Germany	54.42	
7	2	Johannes Tesch	Germany	54.58	
8	8	Christian Ferraro	Italy	55.50	

=== Final ===
The final was held on 27 June at 18:50.

Rank	Lane	Name	Nationality	Time	Notes
1st place, gold medalist(s)	4	Daniil Pakhomov	Russia	52.72	
2nd place, silver medalist(s)	5	Alberto Lozano	Spain	52.78	
3rd place, bronze medalist(s)	3	Daniil Antipov	Russia	53.36	
4	6	Giacomo Carini	Italy	53.69	
5	2	Michał Chudy	Poland	53.90	
6	7	Artūrs Pesockis	Latvia	54.10	
7	1	Daniel Zaitsev	Estonia	54.15	
8	8	Dries Vangoetsenhoven	Belgium	54.16	
