= Swimming at the 2015 European Games – Men's 100 metre backstroke =

Men's 100 metre backstroke at the 2015 European Games
- Venue: Aquatic Palace
- Dates: 23–24 June
- Competitors: 50 from 27 nations
- Winning time: 54.76

Medalists
gold medal	Luke Greenbank	Great Britain
silver medal	Filipp Shopin	Russia
bronze medal	Marek Ulrich	Germany

The men's 100 metre backstroke event at the 2015 European Games in Baku took place on 23 and 24 June at the Aquatic Palace.

== Results ==
=== Heats ===
The heats were started on 23 June at 10:47.

Rank	Heat	Lane	Name	Nationality	Time	Notes
1	4	4	Luke Greenbank	Great Britain	55.12	Q, GR
2	3	4	Marek Ulrich	Germany	55.45	Q
3	5	5	Joe Hulme	Great Britain	55.74	Q
4	5	4	Robert Glință	Romania	55.92	Q
5	3	5	Mikita Tsmyh	Belarus	55.95	Q
6	4	5	Roman Larin	Russia	56.09	Q
7	4	6	Filipp Shopin	Russia	56.13	Q
8	4	3	Nikolaos Sofianidis	Greece	56.29	Q
9	3	2	Petter Fredriksson	Sweden	56.42	Q
10	4	7	Tomáš Franta	Czech Republic	56.45	Q
11	4	2	Jakub Skierka	Poland	56.57	Q
12	5	3	Kristian Komlenić	Croatia	56.58	Q
13	3	7	Bence Szucsik	Hungary	56.79	Q
14	4	8	Javier Romero	Spain	56.81	Q
15	3	3	Kirill Titov	Russia	56.89	
16	5	2	Ole Braunschweig	Germany	56.91	Q
17	3	8	Joe Litchfield	Great Britain	56.92	
17	4	1	Gabriel Lópes	Portugal	56.92	Q
19	1	4	Marek Osina	Czech Republic	56.94	
20	5	6	Lorenzo Glessi	Italy	57.07	
21	2	0	Oskar Ericsson	Sweden	57.22	
21	5	1	Jacopo Bietti	Italy	57.22	
23	4	0	Dawid Murzyn	Poland	57.33	
24	2	4	Christoffer Fredrikson	Finland	57.41	
25	3	6	Nikolay Snegirev	Russia	57.46	
26	2	7	Andrei Gussev	Estonia	57.48	
27	5	8	Dominik Varga	Hungary	57.50	
28	3	9	Lorenzo Mora	Italy	57.72	
29	2	5	Berk Özkul	Turkey	57.91	
30	5	7	Cristiano Hantjoglu	Italy	57.95	
31	3	1	Joan Casanovas	Spain	58.05	
32	5	0	Franz Müller	Germany	58.08	
33	5	9	Rory McEvoy	Ireland	58.20	
34	1	8	Daniel Aizenberg	Israel	58.36	
35	2	1	Moritz Walaschewski	Germany	58.51	
36	2	3	Rasim Oğulcan Gör	Turkey	58.66	
37	3	0	Daniel Kaplan	Israel	58.67	
38	2	6	Timothy Schlatter	Switzerland	58.99	
39	2	9	Idan Dotan	Israel	59.09	
40	2	2	Alan Corby	Ireland	59.15	
41	4	9	Max Mannes	Luxembourg	59.23	
42	2	8	Tomer Drori	Israel	59.27	
43	1	7	João Vital	Portugal	59.47	
44	1	2	Alexander Světlík	Slovakia	59.53	
45	1	5	Qriqoriy Kalminskiy	Azerbaijan	59.79	
46	1	3	Vito Vodenik	Slovenia	59.83	
47	1	6	Thomas Maurer	Switzerland	59.84	
48	1	0	Bragi Snær Hallsson	Iceland	1:00.13	
49	1	9	Adrian Negru	Moldova	1:00.41	
50	1	1	Tarik Hoch	Liechtenstein	1:04.56	

=== Semifinals ===
The semifinals were started on 23 June at 18:37.

==== Semifinal 1 ====
Rank	Lane	Name	Nationality	Time	Notes
1	4	Marek Ulrich	Germany	54.99	Q
2	6	Nikolaos Sofianidis	Greece	55.58	Q
3	5	Robert Glință	Romania	55.70	qSO
3	2	Tomáš Franta	Czech Republic	55.70	qSO
5	3	Roman Larin	Russia	55.82	
6	7	Kristian Komlenić	Croatia	56.02	
7	8	Gabriel Lópes	Portugal	56.23	
8	1	Javier Romero	Spain	57.01	

==== Semifinal 2 ====
Rank	Lane	Name	Nationality	Time	Notes
1	4	Luke Greenbank	Great Britain	54.65	Q, GR
2	6	Filipp Shopin	Russia	55.18	Q
3	3	Mikita Tsmyh	Belarus	55.23	q
4	5	Joe Hulme	Great Britain	55.36	q
5	7	Jakub Skierka	Poland	55.47	q
6	1	Bence Szucsik	Hungary	56.05	
7	2	Petter Fredriksson	Sweden	56.38	
8	8	Ole Braunschweig	Germany	56.67	

=== Swim-off ===
The swim-off was held on 23 June at 20:19.

Rank	Lane	Name	Nationality	Time	Notes
1	4	Robert Glință	Romania	55.31	Q
2	5	Tomáš Franta	Czech Republic	56.02	

=== Final ===
The final was held on 24 June at 17:30.

Rank	Lane	Name	Nationality	Time	Notes
1st place, gold medalist(s)	4	Luke Greenbank	Great Britain	54.76	
2nd place, silver medalist(s)	3	Filipp Shopin	Russia	54.81	
3rd place, bronze medalist(s)	5	Marek Ulrich	Germany	55.35	
4	2	Joe Hulme	Great Britain	55.37	
5	1	Nikolaos Sofianidis	Greece	55.43	
6	7	Jakub Skierka	Poland	55.62	
7	8	Robert Glință	Romania	55.91	
8	6	Mikita Tsmyh	Belarus	56.00	
