= Swimming at the 2015 European Games – Men's 4 × 200 metre freestyle relay =

Men's 4 × 200 metre freestyle relay at the 2015 European Games
- Venue: Aquatic Palace
- Dates: 25 June
- Competitors: 62 from 14 nations
- Winning time: 7:16.08

Medalists
gold medal	Aleksandr Prokofev; Nikolay Snegirev; Ernest Maksumov; Elisei Stepanov; Igor Shadrin; Daniil Antipov	Russia
silver medal	Duncan Scott; Martyn Walton; Kyle Chisholm; Cameron Kurle	Great Britain
bronze medal	Paul Hentschel; Henning Mühlleitner; Konstantin Walter; Moritz Brandt; Alexander Lohmar; Thore Bermel	Germany

The men's 4 × 200 metre freestyle relay event at the 2015 European Games in Baku took place on 25 June at the Aquatic Palace.

== Results ==
=== Heats ===
The heats were started at 10:36.

Rank	Heat	Lane	Nation	Swimmers	Time	Notes
1	2	2	Russia	Igor Shadrin (1:53.26); Ernest Maksumov (1:50.64); Nikolay Snegirev (1:48.87); Daniil Antipov (1:52.70)	7:25.47	Q, GR
2	1	4	Great Britain	Duncan Scott (1:52.45); Martyn Walton (1:51.81); Kyle Chisholm (1:50.90); Cameron Kurle (1:50.75)	7:25.91	Q
3	2	4	Spain	Guillem Pujol (1:50.97) GR; Marc Vivas (1:51.14); Ricardo Rosales (1:51.94); Marcos Rodríguez (1:52.13)	7:26.18	Q
4	1	5	Sweden	Gustaf Dahlman (1:53.51); Daniel Forndal (1:52.69); Filip Grimberg (1:50.56); Victor Johansson (1:51.39)	7:28.15	Q
5	1	2	Italy	Alessio Proietti Colonna (1:52.54); Filippo Megli (1:50.58); Sauro Bertolaccini (1:52.65); Matteo Cinquino (1:52.60)	7:28.37	Q
6	1	1	Belgium	Thomas Thijs (1:52.08); Valentin Borisavljevic (1:51.73); Alexis Borisavljevic (1:52.32); Alexander Trap (1:53.78)	7:29.91	Q
7	1	6	Germany	Alexander Lohmar (1:53.30); Thore Bermel (1:54.54); Konstantin Walter (1:51.32); Moritz Brandt (1:50.93)	7:30.09	Q
8	2	5	Turkey	Erge Gezmis (1:51.20); Batuhan Hakan (1:53.92); Samet Alkan (1:57.76); Kaan Özcan (1:52.25)	7:35.13	Q
9	1	7	Poland	Karol Zbutowicz (1:54.21); Juliusz Gosieniecki (1:54.95); Adam Staniszewski (1:54.27); Mateusz Arndt (1:51.96)	7:35.39	
10	1	3	Switzerland	Cla Remund (1:54.49); Andrea Mozzini Vellen (1:52.99); Manuel Leuthard (1:55.91); Olivier Petignat (1:57.45)	7:40.84	
11	2	1	Ukraine	Kyrylo Garaschenko (1:52.37); Vladyslav Perepelytsia (1:58.76); Illia Pidvalnyi (1:57.97); Viacheslav Ohnov (1:55.57)	7:44.67	
12	2	7	Austria	Filip Milcevic (1:55.18); Robin Grünberger (1:54.50); Lukas Ambros (1:59.07); Sebastian Steffan (1:59.67)	7:48.42	
13	2	3	Romania	Robert Glință (1:58.32); Bogdan Petre (1:59.83); Gabriel Sonoc (1:59.46); Bogdan Scarlat (1:59.76)	7:57.37	
	2	6	Norway	Erik Årsland Gidskehaug (1:53.41); Sigurd Holten Bøen; Eivind Bjelland; Ole-Mikal Fløgstad	DSQ	

=== Final ===
The final was held at 19:54.

Rank	Lane	Nation	Swimmers	Time	Notes
1st place, gold medalist(s)	4	Russia	Aleksandr Prokofev (1:50.29); Nikolay Snegirev (1:48.89); Ernest Maksumov (1:48.96); Elisei Stepanov (1:47.94)	7:16.08	GR
2nd place, silver medalist(s)	5	Great Britain	Duncan Scott (1:49.89); Martyn Walton (1:50.42); Kyle Chisholm (1:50.02); Cameron Kurle (1:49.03)	7:19.36	
3rd place, bronze medalist(s)	1	Germany	Paul Hentschel (1:49.78) GR; Henning Mühlleitner (1:50.77); Konstantin Walter (1:50.39); Moritz Brandt (1:49.83)	7:20.77	
4	3	Spain	Guillem Pujol (1:51.60); Marc Vivas (1:49.55); Joan Casanovas (1:50.65); Marcos Rodríguez (1:51.26)	7:23.06	
5	2	Italy	Filippo Megli (1:51.14); Alessio Proietti Colonna (1:51.92); Matteo Cinquino (1:50.46); Alessandro Miressi (1:51.82)	7:25.34	
6	7	Belgium	Thomas Thijs (1:51.57); Valentin Borisavljevic (1:51.39); Alexis Borisavljevic (1:51.84); Alexander Trap (1:52.15)	7:26.95	
7	6	Sweden	Filip Grimberg (1:52.13); Gustaf Dahlman (1:53.66); Daniel Forndal (1:51.44); Victor Johansson (1:50.89)	7:28.12	
8	8	Turkey	Erge Gezmis (1:51.42); Kaan Özcan (1:51.78); Samet Alkan (1:54.18); Batuhan Hakan (1:54.17)	7:31.55	
