= Shorena Sharadze =

Georgian sambo practitioner and judoka (born 1991)

Shorena Sharadze შორენა შარაძე
- Born: February 6, 1991 (age 35)
- Style: Sambo

Shorena Sharadze (Georgian: შორენა შარაძე; born 6 February 1991) is a Georgian sambo practitioner and judoka. She was the World Sambo champion in her category in 2016.

== Career ==
=== Sambo ===
As a sambo practitioner, she has competed in the -64 kg category.

She won bronze medal at 2012 European Championships held in Moscow and in the following year she has won a second bronze medal at the European Championships in Crema.

In 2016 she was one of only two non-Russians who won one of the twelve available Gold medals. She beat Oksana Lukyanchuk to win the 60 kg category at the Sambo World Cup in Moscow.
