= Evgeny Komarov =

Russian BMX rider

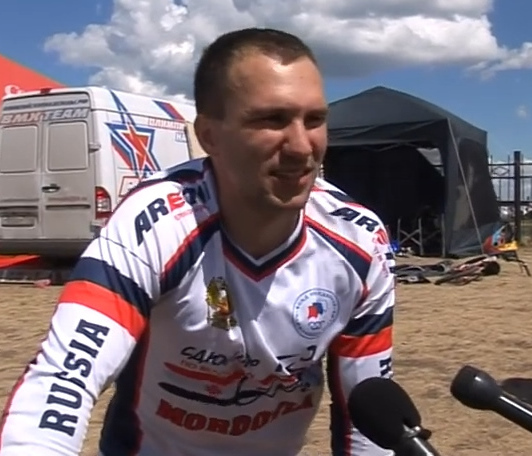
- Komarov in 2017

Personal information
- Born: 8 November 1988 (age 37)

Cycling career
- Sport: Cycling
- Current team: Russia
- Discipline: BMX racing
- Role: Rider

Evgeny Komarov (born 8 November 1988) is a Russian male BMX rider, representing his nation at international competitions. He competed in the time trial event at the 2015 UCI BMX World Championships.
