= Daria Vdovina =

Russian sports shooter (born 1989)

Personal information
- Nationality: Russian
- Born: 15 December 1989 (age 36) Izhevsk, Russian SSR, Soviet Union
- Height: 5 ft 1 in (1.55 m)
- Weight: 104 lb (47 kg)

Sport
- Sport: Sports shooting
- Coached by: Oleg Vdovin
Medal record
Women's shooting
Representing Russia
European Games
Bronze medal – third place	2015 Baku	Mixed 10 m air rifle
European Championships
Gold medal – first place	2018 Győr	Rifle mixed team
Gold medal – first place	2017 Maribor	Rifle team
Silver medal – second place	2017 Maribor	Rifle mixed team
Bronze medal – third place	2017 Maribor	Rifle

Daria Olegovna Vdovina (Russian: Дарья Олеговна Вдовина; born 15 December 1989) is a Russian sports shooter. She competed in the Women's 10 metre air rifle event at the 2012 Summer Olympics.
