= Evgeny Kleshchenko =

Russian BMX rider

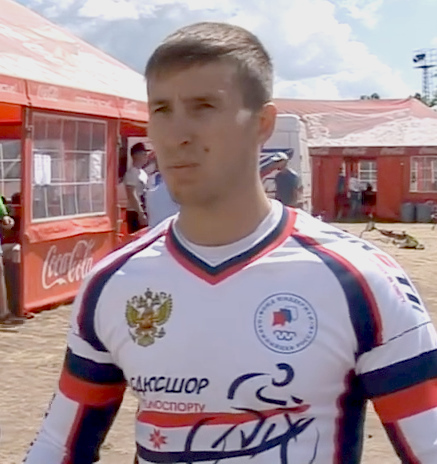
- Kleshchenko in 2017

Personal information
- Born: 16 January 1992 (age 34)

Cycling career
- Sport: Cycling
- Discipline: BMX racing
- Role: Rider

Evgeny Kleshchenko (born 16 January 1992) is a Russian male BMX rider, representing his nation at international competitions. He competed in the time trial event at the 2015 UCI BMX World Championships, but did not finish.
