= Georgia at the European Games =

- IOC code: GEO
- NOC: Georgian National Olympic Committee
- Website: www.geonoc.org.ge
- Medals: Gold 13 Silver 17 Bronze 25 Total 55

European Games appearances (overview)
- 2015; 2019; 2023; 2027

Georgia participated at the inaugural edition of the European Games in 2015.

== Medal tables ==
=== Medals by Games ===
Games	Athletes	Gold	Silver	Bronze	Total	Rank
(Azerbaijan) 2015 Baku	104	2	6	8	16	21
(Belarus) 2019 Minsk	61	7	9	14	30	7
(Poland) 2023 Kraków	100	4	2	3	9	19
(Turkey) 2027 Istanbul	Future event					
Total		13	17	25	55	16

=== Medals by sports ===
Sport	Gold	Silver	Bronze	Total
Judo	5	4	5	14
Sambo	4	3	7	14
Wrestling	1	5	6	12
Kickboxing	1	0	1	2
Fencing	1	0	0	1
Taekwondo	1	0	0	1
Boxing	0	2	1	3
Gymnastics	0	1	1	2
Archery	0	1	0	1
Canoe sprint	0	1	0	1
Karate	0	0	2	2
Muay thai	0	0	1	1
Shooting	0	0	1	1
Totals (13 entries)	13	17	25	55

=== European Championships ===
Games	Athletes	Gold	Silver	Bronze	Total	Rank
(United Kingdom) 2018	21	0	0	0	0	-
(Germany) 2022	12	0	0	0	0	-
Total		0	0	0	0	-
Total Games		363	362	365	1090	-

=== European Para Championships ===
2023 European Para Championships

== List of medallists ==
Medal	Name(s)	Games	Sport	Event
Gold	Avtandil Tchrikishvili	(Azerbaijan) 2015 Baku	Judo	Men's 81 kg
Gold	Adam Okruashvili	(Azerbaijan) 2015 Baku	Judo	Men's +100 kg
Silver	Elizbar Odikadze	(Azerbaijan) 2015 Baku	Wrestling	Men's freestyle 97 kg
Silver	Khatuna Narimanidze; Lasha Pkhakadze	(Azerbaijan) 2015 Baku	Archery	Mixed team
Silver	Beka Lomtadze	(Azerbaijan) 2015 Baku	Wrestling	Men's freestyle 61 kg
Silver	Nugzar Tatalashvili	(Azerbaijan) 2015 Baku	Judo	Men's 73 kg
Silver	Varlam Liparteliani	(Azerbaijan) 2015 Baku	Judo	Men's 90 kg
Silver	Beka Gviniashvili; Varlam Liparteliani; Ushangi Margiani; Levani Matiashvili; Adam Okruashvili; Amiran Papinashvili; Lasha Shavdatuashvili; Nugzar Tatalashvili; Avtandil Tchrikishvili	(Azerbaijan) 2015 Baku	Judo	Men's team
Bronze	Jumber Kvelashvili	(Azerbaijan) 2015 Baku	Wrestling	Men's freestyle 74 kg
Bronze	Sandro Aminashvili	(Azerbaijan) 2015 Baku	Wrestling	Men's freestyle 86 kg
Bronze	Geno Petriashvili	(Azerbaijan) 2015 Baku	Wrestling	Men's freestyle 125 kg
Bronze	Salome Pazhava	(Azerbaijan) 2015 Baku	Gymnastics	Women's individual ribbon
Bronze	Vakhtangi Chidrashvili	(Azerbaijan) 2015 Baku	Sambo	Men's 57 kg
Bronze	Kakha Mamulashvili	(Azerbaijan) 2015 Baku	Sambo	Men's 74 kg
Bronze	Davit Karbelashvili	(Azerbaijan) 2015 Baku	Sambo	Men's 90 kg
Bronze	Amiran Papinashvili	(Azerbaijan) 2015 Baku	Judo	Men's 60 kg

== See also ==
- Georgia at the Olympics
- European Youth Olympic Festival
