= Sambo at the 2015 European Games – Qualification =

Sambo competitions

Qualification for the sambo events at the 2015 European Games will begin in October 2014. Nations are limited to one entry per weight division.

77 quotas were chosen by European Sambo Federation.

== Qualification summary ==
NOC	Men				Women				Total
NOC	57	74	90	+100	52	60	64	68	Total
Armenia	X		X		X				3
Austria				X					1
Azerbaijan	X	X	X	X	X	X	X	X	8
Belarus	X	X	X	X	X	X	X	X	8
Bulgaria	X	X			X	X	X	X	6
France		X			X		X	X	4
Georgia	X	X	X	X		X		X	6
Ireland		X			X				2
Israel						X	X		2
Italy		X							1
Latvia		X							1
Lithuania			X		X				2
Macedonia				X					1
Moldova			X			X	X	X	4
Poland		X							1
Romania	X	X		X	X	X	X		6
Russia	X	X	X	X	X	X	X	X	8
Serbia		X		X				X	3
Slovenia		X							1
Spain		X				X			2
Turkey		X							1
Ukraine	X	X	X	X			X	X	6
22 NOCs	8	16	8	9	9	9	9	9	77
