= Azerbaijan at the 2015 European Games =

- IOC code: AZE
- NOC: National Olympic Committee of the Republic of Azerbaijan
- Website: www.olympic.az

in Baku, Azerbaijan 12 June 2015 – 28 June 2015
- Competitors: 291 in 30 sports
- Flag bearer: Elmar Gasimov
- Medals Ranked 2nd: Gold 21 Silver 15 Bronze 20 Total 56

European Games appearances (overview)
- 2015; 2019; 2023; 2027

Azerbaijan participated at the 2015 European Games in Baku, Azerbaijan from 12 to 28 June 2015. As host nation, Azerbaijan automatically receives a number in quota places in each sport, regardless of how they fare in the qualification.

== Medalists ==
Medal	Name	Sport	Event	Date
Gold	Firdovsi Farzaliyev	Karate	Men's 60 kg	13 June
Gold	Rafael Aghayev	Karate	Men's 75 kg	13 June
Gold	Rasul Chunayev	Wrestling	Men's Greco-Roman 71 kg	13 June
Gold	Irina Zaretska	Karate	Women's 68 kg	14 June
Gold	Aykhan Mamayev	Karate	Men's 84 kg	14 June
Gold	Elvin Mursaliyev	Wrestling	Men's Greco-Roman 75 kg	14 June
Gold	Mariya Stadnyk	Wrestling	Women's Freestyle 48 kg	15 June
Gold	Anzhela Dorogan	Wrestling	Women's Freestyle 53 kg	16 June
Gold	Parviz Ahmadov	Wrestling	Men's Freestyle 65 kg	17 June
Gold	Khetag Gazyumov	Wrestling	Men's Freestyle 97 kg	17 June
Gold	Aykhan Taghizadeh	Taekwondo	Men's 68 kg	17 June
Gold	Milad Beigi	Taekwondo	Men's 80 kg	18 June
Gold	Radik Isayev	Taekwondo	Men's +80 kg	19 June
Gold	Oleh Stepko	Gymnastics	Men's artistic individual all-around	21 June
Gold	Teymur Mammadov	Boxing	Men's 81 kg	25 June
Gold	Elvin Mamishzada	Boxing	Men's 52 kg	26 June
Gold	Lorenzo Sotomayor	Boxing	Men's 64 kg	26 June
Gold	Ilham Zakiyev	Judo	Men's Visually impaired +90 kg	26 June
Gold	Albert Selimov	Boxing	Men's 60 kg	27 June
Gold	Parviz Baghirov	Boxing	Men's 69 kg	27 June
Gold	Abdulkadir Abdullayev	Boxing	Men's 91 kg	27 June
Silver	Rafig Huseynov	Wrestling	Men's Greco-Roman 80 kg	13 June
Silver	Sabahi Shariati	Wrestling	Men's Greco-Roman 130 kg	14 June
Silver	Valentin Demyanenko	Canoe sprint	Men's C1-200m	16 June
Silver	Oleh Stepko	Gymnastics	Men's parallel bars	18 June
Silver	Farida Azizova	Taekwondo	Women's 67 kg	18 June
Silver	Oleh Stepko	Gymnastics	Men's pommel horse	20 June
Silver	Marina Durunda	Gymnastics	Women's rhythmic individual ribbon	21 June
Silver	Islam Gasimov	Sambo	Men's 57 kg	22 June
Silver	Amil Gasimov	Sambo	Men's 74 kg	22 June
Silver	Nazakat Khalilova	Sambo	Women's 52 kg	22 June
Silver	Vasif Safarbeyov	Sambo	Men's +100 kg	22 June
Silver	Orkhan Safarov	Judo	Men's 60 kg	25 June
Silver	Sevil Bunyadova	Fencing	Women's sabre	25 June
Silver	Sabina Abdullayeva	Judo	Women's Visually impaired 57 kg	26 June
Silver	Khaybula Musalov	Boxing	Men's 75 kg	27 June
Bronze	Niyazi Aliyev	Karate	Men's 67 kg	13 June
Bronze	Ilaha Gasimova	Karate	Women's 55 kg	13 June
Bronze	Elman Mukhtarov	Wrestling	Men's Greco-Roman 59 kg	13 June
Bronze	Rostyslav Pevtsov	Triathlon	Men's	14 June
Bronze	Hasan Aliyev	Wrestling	Men's Greco-Roman 66 kg	14 June
Bronze	Petro Pakhnyuk; Oleh Stepko; Eldar Safarov	Gymnastics	Men's artistic team all-around	15 June
Bronze	Nataliya Synyshyn	Wrestling	Women's Freestyle 55 kg	15 June
Bronze	Patimat Abakarova	Taekwondo	Women's 49 kg	16 June
Bronze	Jabrayil Hasanov	Wrestling	Men's Freestyle 74 kg	17 June
Bronze	Haji Aliyev	Wrestling	Men's Freestyle 61 kg	18 June
Bronze	Ruslan Dibirgadjiyev	Wrestling	Men's freestyle 70 kg	18 June
Bronze	Jamaladdin Magomedov	Wrestling	Men's freestyle 125 kg	18 June
Bronze	Oleh Stepko	Gymnastics	Men's vault	21 June
Bronze	Tayfur Aliyev	Boxing	Men's 56 kg	24 June
Bronze	Ilya Grishunin	Gymnastics	Men's trampoline individual	25 June
Bronze	Anna Alimardanova	Boxing	Women's 54 kg	25 June
Bronze	Sevinj Bunyadova	Fencing	Women's sabre	25 June
Bronze	Mahammadrasul Majidov	Boxing	Men's +91 kg	26 June
Bronze	Zakir Mislimov	Judo	Men's Visually impaired +90 kg	26 June

Medals by sport
Sport	1st place, gold medalist(s)	2nd place, silver medalist(s)	3rd place, bronze medalist(s)	Total
Wrestling	6	2	7	15
Boxing	6	1	4	11
Karate	4	0	2	6
Taekwondo	3	1	1	5
Gymnastics	1	3	3	7
Judo	1	2	1	4
Sambo	0	4	0	4
Fencing	0	1	1	2
Canoe spint	0	1	0	1
Triathlon	0	0	1	1
Total	21	15	20	56

== Archery ==
As hosts, Azerbaijan has qualified a maximum of six athletes, on the condition that they enter three athletes per gender at the 2014 European Archery Championships.

Athlete	Event	Ranking round		Round of 64	Round of 32	Round of 16	Quarterfinals	Semifinals	Final / BM	
Athlete	Event	Score	Seed	Opposition Score	Opposition Score	Opposition Score	Opposition Score	Opposition Score	Opposition Score	Rank
Taras Senyuk	Men's individual	643	45	Henckels (LUX); L 4-6	Did not advance					33
Aleksey Kopnin	Men's individual	636	50	Tsybekdorzhiev (RUS); L 2-6	Did not advance					33
Roman Vengerov	Men's individual	614	57	Daniel (FRA); L 0-6	Did not advance					33
Olqa Senyuk	Women's individual	627	34	Bancila (ROU); W 6-5	Jager (DEN); L 3-7	Did not advance				17
Nurlana Velieva	Women's individual	586	60	Timofeeva (RUS); L 0-6	Did not advance					33
Yaylagul Ramazanova	Women's individual	582	61	Narimanidze (GEO); L 4-6	Did not advance					33
Taras Senyuk; Aleksey Kopnin; Roman Vengerov	Men's team	1893	12	—N/a		Italy (ITA); L 4-5	Did not advance			9
Olqa Senyuk; Nurlana Velieva; Yaylagul Ramazanova	Women's team	1795	16	—N/a		Germany (GER); L 0-6	Did not advance			9
Olqa Senyuk; Taras Senyuk	Mixed team	1270	19*	—N/a		Italy (ITA); L 0-6	Did not advance			9

- Azerbaijan gained automatic entry into the last sixteen ahead of sixteenth-placed Great Britain as host.

== Athletics ==
Azerbaijan finished in fifth place in the team event.

Men

Athlete	Event	Result	Rank	Points
Vadim Ryabikhin	100m	10.76	4	11
Vadim Ryabikhin	200m	21.46	5	10
Arif Abbasov	400m	48.05	5	10
Hakim Ibrahimov	800m	1:53.41	8	7
Hayle Ibrahimov	1500m	3:49.69	1	14
Hayle Ibrahimov	3000m	7:54.14	1	14
Hayle Ibrahimov	5000m	14:02.16	1	14
Asaf Mehdiyev	3000m steeplechase	9:46.39	9	6
Rahib Mammadov	110m hurdles	14.22	2	13
Ibrahim Akhmedov	400m hurdles	53.92	8	7
Kamran Asgarov; Vadim Ryabikhin; Valentin Bulychov; Rahib Mammadov	4 × 100 m relay	41.25	5	10
Arif Abbasov; Vadim Ryabikhin; Elmir Jabrayilov; Hakim Ibrahimov	4 × 400 m relay	3:11.18	4	11
Azar Ahmadov	High jump	2.08	7	8
Shimshak Alizada	Pole vault	NM		
Murad Ibadullayev	Long jump	6.99	7	8
Nazim Babayev	Triple jump	16.38	1	14
Tofig Mammadov	Shot put	16.71	8	7
Ismail Aliyev	Discus throw	41.59	9	6
Dzmitry Marshin	Hammer throw	DSQ		
Orxan Qasimov	Javelin throw	50.07	11	4

Women

Athlete	Event	Result	Rank	Points
Valeriya Balyanina	100m	12.07	6	9
Valeriya Balyanina	200m	24.81	7	8
Shafa Mammadova	400m	55.97	5	10
Anastasiya Komarova	800m	2:02.50	3	12
Chaltu Beji	1500m	DSQ		
Chaltu Beji	3000m steeplechase	DSQ		
Bontu Megersa	3000m	9:42.14	3	12
Bontu Megersa	5000m	16:44.57	2	13
Yekaterina Sokolova	100m hurdles	14.42	6	9
Lidiya Salikhova	400m hurdles	1:06.02	9	6
Yekaterina Sokolova; Elena Chebanu; Valeriya Balyanina; Alyona Setina	4 × 100 m relay	46.10	4	11
Shafa Mammadova; Adila Mammadli; Zakiyya Hasanova; Anastasiya Komarova	4 × 400 m relay	3:44.40	5	10
Ilona Salyamova	High jump	1.65	9	6
Yelena Gladkova	Pole vault	3.70	4	11
Yekaterina Sariyeva	Long jump	5.69	5	10
Yekaterina Sariyeva	Triple jump	13.27	3	12
Hanna Skydan	Shot put	13.76	5	10
Hanna Skydan	Discus throw	49.50	3	12
Hanna Skydan	Hammer throw	68.32	2	13
Irada Aliyeva	Javelin throw	36.99	10	5

== Badminton ==
Azerbaijan is guaranteed to enter two players. However a maximum of one player/pair per event will be allowed. If additional players qualify under the regulations, they may also be entered.

Athlete	Event	Group stage				Round of 16	Quarterfinal	Semifinal	Final / BM	
Athlete	Event	Opposition Score	Opposition Score	Opposition Score	Rank	Opposition Score	Opposition Score	Opposition Score	Opposition Score	Rank
Kanan Rzayev	Men's singles	Zilberman (ISR); L 5–21, 3–21	Cali (MLT); W 21–16, 21–12	Maddaloni (ITA); L 6–21, 15–21	3	Did not advance				
Orkhan Qalandarov; Kanan Rzayev	Men's doubles	Vural – Zorlu (TUR); L 7–21, 14–21	Kersaudy – Mittelheisser (FRA); L 6–21, 4–21	Ivanov – Sozonov (RUS); L 7–21, 8–21	4	Did not advance				

== Basketball (3x3) ==
As host NOC, Azerbaijan will enter one men's and one women's team.

Team	Event	Round of 16	Quarterfinal	Semifinal	Final / BM	
Team	Event	Opposition Score	Opposition Score	Opposition Score	Opposition Score	Rank
Rolandas Alijevas; Orhan Aydin Haciyeva; Amil Hamzayev; Marshall Obrian Moses	Men's tournament	Israel (ISR); W 19–14	Spain (ESP); L 14–17	Did not advance		
Tatyana Deniskina; Tiffany Hayes; Aneika Henry; Dina Ulyanova	Women's tournament	Lithuania (LTU); W 17–10	Spain (ESP); L 17–19	Did not advance		

== Beach soccer ==
Azerbaijan is guaranteed participation in beach soccer as hosts.

Team	Event	Group stage				Semifinal	Final / BM	
Team	Event	Opposition Score	Opposition Score	Opposition Score	Rank	Opposition Score	Opposition Score	Rank
Azerbaijan's men	Men's tournament	Ukraine (UKR); L 1–3	Switzerland (SUI); L 7–4	Portugal (POR); L 4–6	4	5-8th place semis Spain (ESP); L 1–3	7th place match Hungary (HUN); L 2–3	8

== Boxing ==
Azerbaijan qualified a maximum of 15 athletes, one in each weight class.

Men

Athlete	Event	Round of 32	Round of 16	Quarterfinals	Semifinals	Final	
Athlete	Event	Opposition Result	Opposition Result	Opposition Result	Opposition Result	Opposition Result	Rank
Salman Alizade	Men's 49kg	—N/a		Irvine (IRL); L 2–1	Did not advance		
Elvin Mamishzada	Men's 52kg	—N/a	Casey (IRL); W 3–0	Asenov (BUL); W 2–1	Touba (GER); W 3–0	Picardi (ITA); W 3–0	1st place, gold medalist(s)
Tayfur Aliyev	Men's 56kg	—N/a	Andreiana (ROU); W 3–0	Jensen (DEN); W 3–0	Nazirov (RUS); L 1–2	Did not advance	3rd place, bronze medalist(s)
Albert Selimov	Men's 60kg	—N/a	Eranosyan (GEO); W 3–0	Dimitrov (BUL); W 3–0	McComb (IRL); W 3–0	Oumiha (FRA); W 3–0	1st place, gold medalist(s)
Lorenzo Sotomayor	Men's 64kg	Sejdinović (SLO); W 3–0	Galagaot (MDA); W 3–0	Niculescu (ROU); W 3–0	Petrov (UKR); W 3–0	Mangiacapre (ITA); W 3–0	1st place, gold medalist(s)
Parviz Baghirov	Men's 69kg	Bye	Belous (MDA); W 3–0	Baraou (GER); W 3–0	Kelly (GBR); W 3–0	Besputin (RUS); W 3–0	1st place, gold medalist(s)
Xaybula Musalov	Men's 75kg	Bye	M'billi (FRA); W 3–0	Bandarenka (BLR); W 3–0	Harcsa (HUN); W 2–1	O'Reilly (IRL); L 0–3	2nd place, silver medalist(s)
Teymur Mammadov	Men's 81kg	Buatsi (GBR); W 3–0	Kuliński (POL); W 3–0	Müllenberg (NED); W 3–0	Silyagin (RUS); W 3–0	Manfredonia (ITA); W 3–0	1st place, gold medalist(s)
Abdulkadir Abdullayev	Men's 91kg	Bye	Hámori (HUN); W 3–0	Omba-Biongolo (FRA); W 3–0	Magomedov (RUS); W 3–0	Manukian (UKR); W/O	1st place, gold medalist(s)
Mahammadrasul Majidov	Men's +91kg	Bye	Bakhtidze (GEO); W 3–0	Demirezen (TUR); W 3–0	Gimbatov (RUS); W/O	Did not advance	3rd place, bronze medalist(s)

Women

Athlete	Event	Round of 16	Quarterfinals	Semifinals	Final	
Athlete	Event	Opposition Result	Opposition Result	Opposition Result	Opposition Result	Rank
Anakhanim Aghayeva	Women's 51kg	Drabik (POL); L 0–3	Did not advance			
Anna Alimardanova	Women's 54kg	Bye	Petrova (BUL); W 3–0	Savelyeva (RUS); L 0–3	Did not advance	3rd place, bronze medalist(s)
Yana Alekseevna	Women's 60kg	Potkonen (FIN); W 3–0	Dobrynina (RUS); W 3–0	Taylor (IRL); L 1–2	Did not advance	3rd place, bronze medalist(s)
Elena Vystropova	Women's 64kg	Bye	Ryan (GBR); L 1–2	Did not advance		
Leyla Cavadova	Women's 75kg	Yakushina (RUS); L 0–2	Did not advance			

== Canoe sprint ==
Azerbaijan qualified more athletes at the 2014 European Championships.

Men

Athlete	Event	Heats		Semifinals		Final	
Athlete	Event	Time	Rank	Time	Rank	Time	Rank
Valentin Demyanenko	C-1 200m	38.978	1 Q	Bye		40.142	2nd place, silver medalist(s)
Taras Matviichuk	C-1 1000m	4:04.220	4 q	3:48.150	4	Did not advance	
Sergiy Bezugliy; Oleksiy Kupin	C-2 1000m	3:46.744	5 q	3:29.489	2 Q	3:38.088	8
Mirnazim Javadov	K-1 200m	36.298	7 q	36.104	7	37.492	7
Mirnazim Javadov	K-1 5000m	—N/a				DNF	
Tamerlan Mustafayev	K-1 1000m	3:58.144	8	Did not advance			

Women

Athlete	Event	Heats		Semifinals		Final	
Athlete	Event	Time	Rank	Time	Rank	Time	Rank
Inna Osypenko-Radomska	K-1 200m	41.968	5 q	40.163	1 Q	42.091	6
Inna Osypenko-Radomska	K-1 500m	1:51.221	2 q	1:48.132	2 Q	2:05.583	5
Inna Osypenko-Radomska	K-1 5000m	—N/a				DNF	

== Cycling ==
A total of seven Azerbaijani athletes competed at the games

Athlete	Event	Time	Rank
Elchin Asadov	Men's road race	5:42.25	55
Maksym Averin	Men's road race	DNS	
Samir Jabrayilov	Men's road race	DNF	
Elchin Asadov	Men's time trial	DNF	
Ulfet Nazarli	Women's road race	DNF	
Olena Pavlukhina	Women's road race	3:25.57	32
Olena Pavlukhina	Women's time trial	33:57.45	6
Aghsin Ismayilov	Men's cross country	LAP	38
Orkhan Mammadov	Men's cross country	DNF	
Ulfet Nazarli	Women's cross country	DNF	

== Diving ==
Two divers competed for Azerbaijan at the games.

Athlete	Event	Preliminaries		Final	
Athlete	Event	Points	Rank	Points	Rank
Artyom Danilov	Men's 1m springboard	427.70	11 Q	455.15	8
Artyom Danilov	Men's 3m springboard	441.14	17	Did not advance	
Olqa Bikovskaya	Women's 1m springboard	265.20	27	Did not advance	
Olqa Bikovskaya	Women's 3m springboard	328.15	26	Did not advance	

== Fencing ==
Men

Athlete	Event	Preliminaries							Round of 32	Round of 16	Quarterfinal	Semifinal	Final / BM	
Athlete	Event	Opposition Score	Opposition Score	Opposition Score	Opposition Score	Opposition Score	Opposition Score	Rank	Opposition Score	Opposition Score	Opposition Score	Opposition Score	Opposition Score	Rank
Kanan Aliyev	Men's épée	von der Osten (DEN); L 3–5	Verwijlen (NED); L 1–5	Hanczvikkel (HUN); W 5–4	Novosjolov (EST); W 5–4	Cimini (ITA); L 2–5	Dobrev (BUL); L 4–5	5	Did not advance					
Mehrab Hasanov	Men's épée	Santarelli (ITA); L 3–5	Jérent (FRA); L 2–5	Vuorinen (FIN); L 2–5	Kuhn (SUI); L 4–5	Glebko (RUS); L 1–5	Jefremenko (LAT); W 5–4	6	Did not advance					
Najaf Maharramov	Men's épée	Khodos (RUS); L 2–5	Herpe (ISR); L 1–5	Borel (FRA); L 4–5	Brunold (SUI); L 4–5	Berta (HUN); L 1–5	Fichera (ITA); L 3–5	7	Did not advance					
Vakil Nasibov	Men's épée	Bino (ITA); L 2–4	Niggeler (SUI); L 4–5	Bida (RUS); L 2–5	Trevejo (FRA); L 2–5	Nikishyn (UKR); L 0–5	File (HUN); L 3–5	7	Did not advance					
Javanshir Aghakishiyev	Men's sabre	Hübers (GER); L 1–5	Arnaudov (BUL); W 3–1	Willau (AUT); L 3–5	Proskura (RUS); L 3–5	Pellegrini (ITA); L 1–5	—N/a	5	Did not advance					
Abdulla Hasanov	Men's sabre	Gémesi (HUN); L 2–5	Hübner (GER); L 3–5	Badea (ROU); L 1–5	Murolo (ITA); L 1–5	Skrodzi (POL); L 1–5	—N/a	6	Did not advance					
Javanshir Safarov	Men's sabre	Trushakov (RUS); L 0–5	Buikevich (BLR); L 0–5	Kindler (GER); L 0–5	Miracco (ITA); L 0–5	Csaba (HUN); W 5–4	—N/a	5	Did not advance					
Azar Taghiyev	Men's sabre	Tsouroutas (GRE); W 5–3	Ahmet Ant (TUR); L 3–5	Casares (ESP); L 3–5	Dolniceanu (ROU); L 3–5	Honeybone (GBR); L 4–5	—N/a	4 Q	Dolniceanu (ROU); L 5–15	Did not advance				
Kanan Aliyev; Mehrab Hasanov; Najaf Maharramov; Vakil Nasibov	Team épée	—N/a									Russia (RUS); L 26–45	—N/a	5th place match Hungary (HUN); L 37–45	6
Javanshir Aghakishiyev; Abdulla Hasanov; Javanshir Safarov; Azar Taghiyev	Team sabre	—N/a									Russia (RUS); L 18–45	—N/a	5th place match Hungary (HUN); L 19–45	6

Women

Athlete	Event	Preliminaries							Round of 32	Round of 16	Quarterfinal	Semifinal	Final / BM	
Athlete	Event	Opposition Score	Opposition Score	Opposition Score	Opposition Score	Opposition Score	Opposition Score	Rank	Opposition Score	Opposition Score	Opposition Score	Opposition Score	Opposition Score	Rank
Samira Huseynova	Women's épée	Kirpu (EST); L 2–5	Bohus (HUN); L 1–5	Lawrence (GBR); L 3–5	Batini (ITA); L 4–5	Kochneva (RUS); L 0–5	Caran (SRB); L 3–5	7	Did not advance					
Elmira Khudaverdiyeva	Women's épée	Bukócki (HUN); L 2–5	Nelip (POL); L 0–5	Samuelsson (SWE); L 2–5	Brânză (ROU); L 1–5	Beljajeva (EST); L 3–5	Cipárová (SVK); L 3–5	7	Did not advance					
Maryam Malikova	Women's épée	Santuccio (ITA); L 4–5	Andryushina (RUS); L 1–5	Kock (FIN); L 0–5	Shemyakina (UKR); L 3–5	Tătăran (ROU); L 2–5	Lehis (EST); L 1–5	7	Did not advance					
Nubar Malikova	Women's épée	Gherman (ROU); L 0–5	Marinuk (ISR); L 2–5	Kun (HUN); L 2–5	Schmidl (AUT); L 4–5	Rizzi (ITA); L 0–5	Zvereva (RUS); L 3–5	7	Did not advance					
Sevil Bunyatova	Women's sabre	Itzkowitz (GBR); W 5–3	Kovaleva (RUS); W 5–4	Pascu (ROU); L 1–5	Zhovnir (UKR); W 5–4	Gevaert (BEL); W 5–3	—N/a	2 Q	Pasternak (POL); W 15–4	Ridel (RUS); W 15–9	Vougiouka (GRE); W 15–12	Rifkiss (FRA); W 15–9	Wątor (POL); L 14–15	2nd place, silver medalist(s)
Sevinc Bunyatova	Women's sabre	Stoltz (FRA); W 5–3	Gargano (ITA); W 5–0	Wątora (POL); W 5–2	Kharlan (UKR); W 5–3	Sarban (TUR); W 5–2	—N/a	1 Q	Bye	Gargano (ITA); W 15–7	Komashchuk (UKR); W 15–11	Wątor (POL); L 11–15	Did not advance	3rd place, bronze medalist(s)
Fatima Ibrahimova	Women's sabre	Kravatska (UKR); L 1–5	Ridel (RUS); W 5–4	Navarria (ITA); W 5–1	Balzer (FRA); L 2–5	Ágústsdóttir (ISL); W 5–2	—N/a	3 Q	Gargano (ITA); L 7–15	Did not advance				
Sabina Mikina	Women's sabre	Vila (ESP); W 5–1	Sukhova (RUS); W 5–2	Andreyeva (BLR); W 5–3	Ciaraglia (ITA); W 5–4	Kaleta (POL); W 5–2	1 Q	Bye	Obvintseva (RUS); L 13–15	Did not advance				
Samira Huseynova; Elmira Khudaverdiyeva; Maryam Malikova; Nubar Malikova	Team épée	—N/a									Russia (RUS); L 19–14	—N/a	5th place match Hungary (HUN); L 25–45	6
Sevil Bunyatova; Sevinc Bunyatova; Fatima Ibrahimova; Sabina Mikina	Team sabre	—N/a									Ukraine (UKR); L 24–45	—N/a	5th place match Poland (POL); W 45–41	5

== Gymnastics ==
The host nation is guaranteed the maximum quota of 29 athletes in the gymnastics events.

Acrobatic

Athlete	Event	Qualification		Total	
Athlete	Event	Score	Rank	Score	Rank
Ulyana Dyakova; Anatoliy Leonov	All-around	52.270	6 Q	77.430	6
Ulyana Dyakova; Anatoliy Leonov	Balance	25.750	6 Q	24.580	6
Ulyana Dyakova; Anatoliy Leonov	Dynamic	—N/a		27.320	5
Aynur Huseynova; Lala Huseynova; Narmin Ramazanova	Groups all-around	54.820	6 Q	82.310	5
Aynur Huseynova; Lala Huseynova; Narmin Ramazanova	Groups balance	27.680	5 Q	27.730	4
Aynur Huseynova; Lala Huseynova; Narmin Ramazanova	Groups dynamic	27.140	6 Q	27.740	5

Aerobic

Athlete	Event	Qualification		Total	
Athlete	Event	Score	Rank	Score	Rank
Vera Bosykh; Vladimir Dolmatov	Mixed pairs	18.000	10	Did not advance	
Timur Alekperov; Vera Bosykh; Vladimir Dolmatov; Ekaterina Kotliarova; Elcin Mammadov	Mixed groups	17.383	10	Did not advance	

Men's artistic

Athlete	Event	Final							
Athlete	Event	Apparatus						Total	Rank
Athlete	Event	F	PH	R	V	PB	HB	Total	Rank
Petro Pakhnyuk	Team all-around	14.833	14.633	—N/a	14.833	15.266	13.666	—N/a	
Elder Safarov	Team all-around	11.766	9.133	12.733	12.433	11.500	12.100	—N/a	
Oleg Stepko	Team all-around	13.866	15.333	14.700	14.866	15.566	13.900	—N/a	
Total		28.699	29.966	27.433	29.699	30.832	27.566	174.195	3rd place, bronze medalist(s)

Athlete	Event	Apparatus						Total	Rank
Athlete	Event	V	F	PH	R	PB	HB	Total	Rank
Oleg Stepko	Individual all-around	14.600	15.300	14.633	14.766	15.866	13.900	89.065	2nd place, silver medalist(s)
Oleg Stepko	Vault	14.966	—N/a					14.966	3rd place, bronze medalist(s)
Oleg Stepko	Pommel horse	—N/a		14.600	—N/a			14.600	2nd place, silver medalist(s)
Oleg Stepko	Rings	—N/a			14.466	—N/a		14.466	4
Oleg Stepko	Parallel bars	—N/a				15.733	—N/a	15.733	1st place, gold medalist(s)

Women's artistic

Athlete	Event	Final					
Athlete	Event	Apparatus				Total	Rank
Athlete	Event	V	UB	BB	F	Total	Rank
Yulia Inshina	Team	12.566	10.700	12.266	12.100	—N/a	
Marina Nekrasova	Team	13.566	11.300	12.966	12.700	—N/a	
Kristina Pravdina	Team	11.266	11.666	12.033	—N/a	—N/a	
Total		26.132	22.966	25.232	24.800	99.130	13

Rhythmic

Athlete	Event	Final					
Athlete	Event	Hoop	Ball	Clubs	Ribbon	Total	Rank
Sabina Abbasova; Diana Doman; Aynur Mustafayeva; Aleksandra Platonova; Siyana Vasileva	Group	—N/a				32.150	9
Marina Durunda	Individual	18.100	17.900	16.050	17.800	69.850	8
Marina Durunda	Hoop	17.800	—N/a			17.800	5
Marina Durunda	Ball	—N/a	16.100	—N/a		16.100	6
Marina Durunda	Ribbon	—N/a			18.200	18.200	2nd place, silver medalist(s)

Trampoline

Athlete	Event	Qualification		Final	
Athlete	Event	Score	Rank	Score	Rank
Ilya Grishunin	Men's individual	104.640	5 Q	58.765	3rd place, bronze medalist(s)
Oleg Piunov	Men's individual	103.650	9	Did not advance	
Ilya Grishunin; Oleg Piunov	Men's synchro	54.400	9	Did not advance	
Sviatlana Makshtarova	Women's individual	100.370	4 Q	52.595	5
Sabina Zaitseva	Women's individual	93.685	14	Did not advance	
Sviatlana Makshtarova; Sabina Zaitseva	Women's synchro	43.800	9	Did not advance	

== Judo ==
Men

Athlete	Event	Round of 32	Round of 16	Quarterfinals	Semifinals	Repechage	Final / BM	
Athlete	Event	Opposition Result	Opposition Result	Opposition Result	Opposition Result	Opposition Result	Opposition Result	Rank
Orkhan Safarov	Men's 60kg	Bye	Bagirov (BLR); W 012–010	Chammartin (SUI); W 011–000	Garrigós (ESP); W 000–000	—N/a	Mudranov (RUS); L 000–100	2nd place, silver medalist(s)
Nijat Shikhalizada	Men's 66kg	Sandal (TUR); W 100–000	Verde (ITA); W 110–000	Oleinic (POR); L 000–100	—N/a	Zantaraia (UKR); W 100–010	Pulyaev (RUS); L 000–010	=5
Rustam Orujov	Men's 73kg	Ježek (CZE); L 000–100	Did not advance					
Ramin Gurbanov	Men's 90kg	Dias (POR); W 101–000	Tóth (HUN); L 000–000	Did not advance				
Elkhan Mammadov	Men's 100kg	Kumrić (CRO); W 100–000	Krpálek (CZE); L 000–1000	Did not advance				
Ushangi Kokauri	Men's +100kg	Ceraj (SLO); W 101–000	Matiashvili (GEO); L 000–100	Did not advance				
Zakir Mislimov	Men's blind +90kg	—N/a		Pominov (UKR); L 000–100	—N/a	Taurines (FRA); W 101–000	Papachristos (GRE); W 100–000	3rd place, bronze medalist(s)
Ilham Zakiyev	Men's blind +90kg	—N/a			Papachristos (GRE); W 100–000	—N/a	Pominov (UKR); W 100–000	1st place, gold medalist(s)

Women

Athlete	Event	Round of 32	Round of 16	Quarterfinals	Semifinals	Repechage	Final / BM	
Athlete	Event	Opposition Result	Opposition Result	Opposition Result	Opposition Result	Opposition Result	Opposition Result	Rank
Leyla Aliyeva	Women's 48kg	Vršič (SLO); W 000–000	Van Snick (BEL); L 000–100	Did not advance				
Sakina Zayirova	Women's 52kg	Schwartz (ISR); L 000–100	Did not advance					
Kifayat Gasimova	Women's 57kg	Rogić (SRB); L 000–000	Did not advance					
Khanim Huseynova	Women's 63kg	Nikoloska (MKD); W 102–001	Agbegnenou (FRA); L 000–100	Did not advance				
Valida Mirzazada	Women's 70kg	Taeymans (BEL); L 000–101	Did not advance					
Gunel Hasanli	Women's 78kg	Galeone (ITA); L 000–100	Did not advance					
Sabina Abdullayeva	Women's blind 57kg	—N/a		Merenciano (ESP); W 100–000	Nikolaychyk (UKR); W 011–000	—N/a	Cherniak (UKR); L 001–100	2nd place, silver medalist(s)

== Karate ==
As hosts, Azerbaijan had one athlete in each weight category.

Men

Athlete	Event	Group stage				Semifinals	Final / BM	
Athlete	Event	Opposition Result	Opposition Result	Opposition Result	Rank	Opposition Result	Opposition Result	Rank
Tural Baljanli	Men's kata	M Yakan (TUR); L 0–5	Dack (FRA); L 0–5	Guta (ROU); W 5–0	3	Did not advance		
Firdovsi Farzaliyev	Men's kumite 60kg	Gómez (ESP); W 2–0	Maresca (ITA); W 4–2	Marqeshi (ALB); W 6–0	1 Q	Pavlov (MKD); W 8–0	Maresca (ITA); W 4–0	1st place, gold medalist(s)
Niyazi Aliyev	Men's kumite 67kg	Da Costa (FRA); W 3–1	Tkebuchava (GEO); W 2–0	Rasero (ESP); W 2–0	1 Q	Uygur (TUR); L 1–4	Giegler (GER); W 3–1	3rd place, bronze medalist(s)
Rafael Aghayev	Men's kumite 75kg	Nikulin (UKR); W 3–0	Eltemur (TUR); L 3–5	Sadikovs (LAT); W 3–1	2 Q	Bitsch (GER); W 1–0	Busà (ITA); W 1–0	1st place, gold medalist(s)
Aykhan Mamayev	Men's kumite 84kg	Tzanos (GRE); D 0–0	Horuna (UKR); W 6–3	Grillon (FRA); W 6–1	2 Q	Karaqi (KOS); W 6–1	Tzanos (GRE); W 1–1	1st place, gold medalist(s)
Shahin Atamov	Men's kumite +84kg	Erkan (TUR); L 0–10	Nestorovski (MKD); L 2–5	Margaritospoulous (GRE); L 0–2	4	Did not advance		

Women

Athlete	Event	Group stage				Semifinals	Final / BM	
Athlete	Event	Opposition Result	Opposition Result	Opposition Result	Rank	Opposition Result	Opposition Result	Rank
Adila Gurbanova	Women's individual kata	Bleul (GER); L 0–5	Bozan (TUR); L 0–5	Kiuk (CRO); L 0–5	4	Did not advance		
Nurana Aliyeva	Women's kumite 50kg	Plank (AUT); L 0–1	Özçelik (TUR); L 0–6	Beruleč (CRO); L 0–3	4	Did not advance		
Ilaha Qasimova	Women's kumite 55kg	Warling (LUX); W 4–0	T Yakan (TUR); W 1–0	Kovačević (CRO); L 0–1	2 Q	Thouy (FRA); L 1–6	Ferrer (ESP); W 5–2	3rd place, bronze medalist(s)
Farida Abiyeva	Women's kumite 61kg	Suchánková (SVK); D 2–2	Lenard (CRO); L 0–6	Çoban (TUR); L 1–2	4	Did not advance		
Irina Zaretska	Women's kumite 68kg	Vizcaíno (ESP); W 6–1	Buchinger (AUT); L 0–4	Panetsidou (GRE); W 1–0	2 Q	Raković (MNE); W 1–0	Buchinger (AUT); W 8–1	1st place, gold medalist(s)
Aytan Samadli	Women's kumite +68kg	Martinović (CRO); L 1–2	Ait-Ibrahim (FRA); L 0–5	Antunovic (SWE); L 1–9	4	Did not advance		

== Sambo ==
Athlete	Event	Round of 16	Quarterfinal	Semifinal	Final / BM	
Athlete	Event	Opposition Result	Opposition Result	Opposition Result	Opposition Result	Rank
Islam Gasumov	Men's -57kg	—N/a	Gruia (ROU); W 4–0	Chidrashvili (GEO); W 3–1	Atkunov (RUS); L 0–4	2nd place, silver medalist(s)
Amil Gasimov	Men's 74kg	Bye	Mamulashvili (GEO); W 3–1	Ivanov (BUL); W 3–1	Papou (BLR); L 0–4	2nd place, silver medalist(s)
Kanan Gasimov	Men's 90kg	—N/a	Vasylchuk (UKR); W 2–0	Chernoskulov (RUS); L 0–4	Karbelashvili (GEO); L 1–3	=5
Vasif Safarbayov	Men's +100kg	—N/a	Mashovikj (MKD); W 4–0	Tonoyan (UKR); W 2–0	Osipenko (RUS); L 0–4	2nd place, silver medalist(s)
Nazakat Khalilova	Women's 52kg	—N/a	Ionescu (ROU); W 3–1	Aksionova (LTU); W 4–0	Kharitonova (RUS); L 0–4	2nd place, silver medalist(s)
Shahane Huseynova	Women's 60kg	Bye	Kostenko (RUS); L 0–4	Sharadze (GEO); W 2–0	Prakapenka (BLR); L 0–4	=5
Farida Gurbanova	Women's 64kg	—N/a	Cretu (MDA); L 0–4	Did not advance		
Narmina Alizada	Women's 68kg	Bye	Namazava (BLR); L 0–4	—N/a	Condé (FRA); L 0–4	=5

== Shooting ==
Azerbaijan gained 9 host quota places.

Athlete	Event	Qualification		Final	
Athlete	Event	Points	Rank	Total	Rank
Alimirza Guliyev	Trap	107	32	Did not advance	
Elvin Ismayilov	Trap	109	31	Did not advance	
Emin Jafarov	Skeet	116	24	Did not advance	
Pasha Ahmadpour Khanghah	Skeet	110	30	Did not advance	
Ruslan Lunev	10m air pistol	574	19	Did not advance	
Ruslan Lunev	25m rapid fire pistol	575	12	Did not advance	
Rasul Mammadov	10m air pistol	559	32	Did not advance	
Rasul Mammadov	50m pistol	540	24	Did not advance	

Women

Athlete	Event	Qualification		Final	
Athlete	Event	Points	Rank	Total	Rank
Irada Ashumova	10m air pistol	373	26	Did not advance	
Irada Ashumova	25m pistol	576	15	Did not advance	
Nurlana Jafarova	Skeet	65	18	Did not advance	
Alina Rafikhanova	Trap	47	20	Did not advance	

Mixed

Athlete	Event	Qualification		Semifinal		Final	
Athlete	Event	Points	Rank	Points	Rank	Total	Rank
Irada Ashumova; Ruslan Lunev	Mixed 10m air pistol	473	10	Did not advance			
Emin Jafarov; Nurlana Jafarova	Mixed skeet	87	11	Did not advance			
Elvin Ismayilov; Alina Rafikhanova	Mixed trap	74	10	Did not advance			

== Swimming ==
Azerbaijan had nine swimmers at the Games.

Athlete	Event	Heat		Semifinal		Final	
Athlete	Event	Time	Rank	Time	Rank	Time	Rank
Ivan Andrianov	50m butterfly	25.14	27	Did not advance			
Ivan Andrianov	100m butterfly	56.03	24	Did not advance			
Murat Ayhan	50m breaststroke	34.02	45	Did not advance			
Dorian Fazekas	50m freestyle	24.32	53	Did not advance			
Dorian Fazekas	100m freestyle	54.76	61	Did not advance			
Kamran Jafrov	100m freestyle	57.43	63	Did not advance			
Anton Jeltyakov	50m breaststroke	29.21	19	Did not advance			
Anton Jeltyakov	100m breaststroke	1:03.83	17 Q	1:03.79	8	Did not advance	
Anton Jeltyakov	200m breaststroke	2:19.38	17 Q	2:18.79	8	Did not advance	
Qriqoriy Kalminskiy	50m backstroke	27.89	36	Did not advance			
Qriqoriy Kalminskiy	100m backstroke	59.79	45	Did not advance			
Qriqoriy Kalminskiy	200m backstroke	2:09.69	31	Did not advance			
Ivan Andrianov; Dorian Fazekas; Kamran Jafarov; Qriqoriy Kalminskiy	4 × 100 m freestyle relay	3:37.06	14	Did not advance			

Women

Athlete	Event	Heat		Semifinal		Final	
Athlete	Event	Time	Rank	Time	Rank	Time	Rank
Alsu Bayramova	100m butterfly	1:06.20	36	Did not advance			
Alsu Bayramova	200m butterfly	2:24.36	22	Did not advance			
Anna Manchenkova	50m freestyle	29.07	56	Did not advance			
Anna Manchenkova	100m freestyle	1:03.15	63	Did not advance			
Anna Manchenkova	50m butterfly	30.98	49	Did not advance			
Yuliya Stisyuk	50m backstroke	33.05	45	Did not advance			
Yuliya Stisyuk	100m backstroke	1:10.50	38	Did not advance			
Yuliya Stisyuk	200m backstroke	2:30.06	33	Did not advance			

== Synchronized swimming ==
As host nation, Azerbaijan is guaranteed ten athletes in synchronized swimming.

- Women's events – 10 quota places

== Table tennis ==
Azerbaijan had a team of six players, three men and three women.

Athlete	Event	Round of 64	Round of 32	Round of 16	Quarterfinals	Semifinals	Final / BM	
Athlete	Event	Opposition Result	Opposition Result	Opposition Result	Opposition Result	Opposition Result	Opposition Result	Rank
Farhad Ismayilov	Men's singles	Bobocica (ITA); L 0–4	Did not advance					
Ramil Jafarov	Men's singles	Wang (POL); L 0–4	Did not advance					
Rufat Guliyeva	Women's singles	Szőcs (ROU); L 0–4	Did not advance					
Maryan Imanova	Women's singles	Dvorak (ESP); L 0–4	Did not advance					
Khayai Hashimli; Farhad Ismayilov; Ramil Jafarov	Men's team	—N/a			Poland (POL); L 0–3	Did not advance		
Rufat Guliyeva; Maryam Imanova; Sharmin Shirinova	Women's team	—N/a			France (FRA); L 0–3	Did not advance		

== Taekwondo ==
As hosts, Azerbaijan had eight athletes compete.

Athlete	Event	Round of 16	Quarterfinals	Semifinals	Repechage	Final / BM	
Athlete	Event	Opposition Result	Opposition Result	Opposition Result	Opposition Result	Opposition Result	Rank
Mahammad Mammadov	Men's 58kg	Haimovitz (ISR); W 7–4	Tortosa (ESP); L 3–8	—N/a	Kokshyntsau (BLR); W 15–3	Ketbi (BEL); L 4–5	=5
Aykhan Taghizade	Men's 68kg	Pantar (SLO); W 11–3	González (ESP); W 7–5	Denisenko (RUS); W 7–5	—N/a	Robak (POL); W 10–9	1st place, gold medalist(s)
Milad Beigi	Men's 80kg	Fejzić (SRB); W 12–0	Muhammad (AZE); W 17–5	Ferreira (POR); W 6–2	—N/a	Gaun (RUS); W 9–4	1st place, gold medalist(s)
Radik Isayev	Men's +80kg	Bye	Wanrooij (NED); W 8–6	Trajkovič (SLO); W 17–2	—N/a	Larin (RUS); W 4–3	1st place, gold medalist(s)
Patimat Abakarova	Women's 49kg	Lychagina (RUS); W 7–1	Koutsou (GRE); W 4–2	Bogdanović (SRB); L 6–7	—N/a	Nicoli (ITA); W 13–0	3rd place, bronze medalist(s)
Gunay Aghakishiyeva	Women's 57kg	Gladović (SRB); L 4–8	Did not advance				
Farida Azizova	Women's 67kg	van Baaren (NED); W 2–0	Tatar (TUR); W 6–2	Johansson (SWE); W 5–2	—N/a	Baryshnikova (RUS); L 5–6	2nd place, silver medalist(s)
Marina Tedeeva	Women's +67kg	Konieva (UKR); L 4–10	Did not advance				

== Triathlon ==
Three triathletes competed for Azerbaijan.

Athlete	Event	Swim (1.5 km)	Trans 1	Bike (40 km)	Trans 2	Run (10 km)	Total Time	Rank
Alexander Iatcenko	Men's	21:44	0:46	DNF				
Rostyslav Pevtsov	Men's	19:30	0:42	57:44	0:28	30:40	1:49:04	3rd place, bronze medalist(s)
Kseniia Levkovska	Women's	21:36	0:54	1:05:25	0:30	37:22	2:05:47	17

== Volleyball ==
Azerbaijan will compete with two teams in each beach event, and with one team in each indoor event.

=== Beach ===
Athlete	Event	Preliminary round				Round of 24	Round of 16	Quarterfinals	Semifinals	Final	
Athlete	Event	Opposition Score	Opposition Score	Opposition Score	Rank	Opposition Score	Opposition Score	Opposition Score	Opposition Score	Opposition Score	Rank
Bernardo Romano; Leonid Gritsai	Men's	Rumševičius/Každailis (LTU); W 21–14, 21–19	Hordvik/Kvamsdal (NOR); L 19–21, 21–19, 12–15	Ranghieri/Rossi (ITA); L 15–21, 9–21	3 q	Barsuk/Koshkarev (RUS); L 21–17, 17–21, 13–15	Did not advance				
Neilton Santos; Iaroslav Rudykh	Men's	Kufa/Dumek (CZE); L 20–22, 19–21	Thirecy/Di Giantomasso (FRA); W 23–25, 21–13, 15–10	Chevallier/Krattiger (SUI); L 19–21, 13–21	2 q	Denin/Plotnytskyi (UKR); W 21–15, 20–22, 15–12	Pļaviņš/Regža (LAT); L 22–20, 16–21, 13–15	Did not advance			
Vivian Cunha; Zinaida Liubymova	Women's	Bang/Olsen (DEN); W 21–14, 21–17	Schützenhöfer/Plesiutschnig (AUT); L 19–21, 15–21	Dumbauskaitė/Povilaitytė (LTU); L 17–21, 23–21, 15–17	3 q	Er Nyström/Em Nyström (FIN); W 21–19, 21–13	Giombini/Toti (ITA); L 21–17, 17–21, 11–15	Did not advance			
Raquel Gonçalves Ferreira; Iuliia Karimova	Women's	Kociołek/Strąg (POL); W 21–18, 21–18	Udovenko/Sulima (UKR); W 21–17, 21–16	Řeháčková/Gálová (CZE); L 21–17, 21–23, 8–15	2 q	Žolnerčiková/Jakubšová (CZE); L 21–23, 19–21	Did not advance				

=== Indoor ===
Team	Event	Group stage						Quarterfinal	Semifinal	Final / BM	
Team	Event	Opposition Score	Opposition Score	Opposition Score	Opposition Score	Opposition Score	Rank	Opposition Score	Opposition Score	Opposition Score	Rank
Azerbaijan men's	Men's tournament	Finland (FIN); L 2–3	Serbia (SRB); L 0–3	France (FRA); L 0–3	Poland (POL); L 0–3	Turkey (TUR); L 2–3	6	Did not advance			
Azerbaijan women's	Women's tournament	Romania (ROU); W 3–1	Poland (POL); W 3–0	Italy (ITA); W 3–1	Belgium (BEL); W 3–2	Turkey (TUR); L 0–3	2 Q	Netherlands (NED); W 3–0	Turkey (TUR); L 2–3	Serbia (SRB); L 2–3	4

== Water polo ==
Azerbaijan will be represented in the men's tournament.

Team	Event	Group stage				Quarterfinal	Semifinal	Final / BM	
Team	Event	Opposition Score	Opposition Score	Opposition Score	Rank	Opposition Score	Opposition Score	Opposition Score	Rank
Azerbaijan men's	Men's tournament	Romania (ROU); L 6–9	Hungary (HUN); L 3–23	Germany (GER); L 7–17	3	—N/a	13-16th place semis Malta (MLT); W 8–7	13th place match Turkey (TUR); L 6–11	14

== Wrestling ==
Men

Athlete	Event	Qualification	Round of 16	Quarterfinal	Semifinal	Repechage 1	Repechage 2	Final / BM	
Athlete	Event	Opposition Result	Opposition Result	Opposition Result	Opposition Result	Opposition Result	Opposition Result	Opposition Result	Rank
Yashar Aliyev	Men's freestyle 57kg	Bye	El Ouarraqe (FRA); W 9–4	Barseghyan (ARM); W 10–6	Lebedev (RUS); L 1–3	—N/a		S Akgul (TUR); L 3–8	=5
Haji Aliyev	Men's freestyle 61kg	—N/a	Frangulyan (ARM); W 7–0	Bolotnjuk (SVK); W 11–0	Bogomoev (RUS); L 2–5	—N/a		Aktaş (TUR); W 10–2	3rd place, bronze medalist(s)
Parviz Ahmadov	Men's freestyle 65kg	Bekbulatov (RUS); W 8–7	Sava (MDA); W 10–0	Fiquet (FRA); W 10–0	Nurykau (BLR); W 7–2	—N/a		Chamizo (ITA); W 4–2	1st place, gold medalist(s)
Ruslan Dibirgadjiyev	Men's freestyle 70kg	Bye	Gadzhiev (POL); L 2–7	—N/a		Kirov (BUL); W 4–1	Gulyás (HUN); W 4–3	Tlashadze (GEO); W 6–2	3rd place, bronze medalist(s)
Jabrayil Hasanov	Men's freestyle 74kg	Bye	Nagy (HUN); W 10–0	Demirtaş (TUR); L 3–5	—N/a		Selenius (FIN); W 11–0	Terziev (BUL); W 9–0	3rd place, bronze medalist(s)
Nurmaqomed Qadjiyev	Men's freestyle 86kg	Bye	Sredkov (BUL); W 14–2	Sadulaev (RUS); W 11–1	—N/a		Vasile Ziz (ITA); W 10–1	Marcinkiewicz (POL); L 3–5	=5
Khetag Gazyumov	Men's freestyle 97kg	Ra Baran (POL); W 10–0	Ceban (MDA); W 4–0	Saidov (BLR); W 2–1	Gadisov (RUS); W 4–2	—N/a		Odikadze (GEO); W 3–1	1st place, gold medalist(s)
Jamaladdin Magomedov	Men's freestyle 125kg	Rudavičius (LTU); W 10–0	T Akgul (TUR); L 2–5	—N/a		Ro Baran (POL); W 11–0	—N/a	Gagloev (SVK); W 7–2	3rd place, bronze medalist(s)
Elman Mukhtarov	Men's Greco-Roman 59kg	Bye	Meladze (GEO); W 5–3	Berge (NOR); W 7–6	Maryanyan (RUS); L 3–11	—N/a		Amoyan (ARM); W 9–1	3rd place, bronze medalist(s)
Hasan Aliyev	Men's Greco-Roman 66kg	Davitaia (GEO); W 4–2	Janečić (CRO); W 5–0	Siamionau (BLR); W 3–0	Harutyunyan (ARM); L 5–8	—N/a		Maksimović (SRB); W 4–0	3rd place, bronze medalist(s)
Rasul Chunayev	Men's Greco-Roman 71kg	Bye	Cataraga (MDA); W 7–6	Etlinger (CRO); W 4–0	Kostadinov (BUL); W 10–0	—N/a		Korpási (HUN); W 4–2	1st place, gold medalist(s)
Elvin Mursaliyev	Men's Greco-Roman 75kg	Rigo (SVK); W 8–0	Puscasu (ROU); W 2–1	Labazanov (RUS); W 4–2	Datunashvili (GEO); W 3–2	—N/a		Nemeš (SRB); W 5–1	1st place, gold medalist(s)
Rafig Huseynov	Men's Greco-Roman 80kg	Bye	Wagner (AUT); W 11–0	Aleksandrov (BUL); W 10–0	Çebi (TUR); W 9–0	—N/a		Saleev (RUS); L 0–2	2nd place, silver medalist(s)
Saman Tahmasebi	Men's Greco-Roman 85kg	Parisi (ITA); W 8–0	Manukyan (ARM); L 0–9	Did not advance					
Orkhan Nuriyev	Men's Greco-Roman 98kg	Tounousidis (SWE); W 4–1	Laurinaitis (LTU); W 9–1	Magomedov (RUS); L 1–3	—N/a	Arusaar (EST); W 2–0	İldem (TUR); L 0–3	=5	
Sabah Shariati	Men's Greco-Roman 130kg	—N/a	Kuchmii (UKR); W 8–0	Kajaia (GEO); W 5–2	Chugoshvili (BLR); W 6–0	—N/a		Kayaalp (TUR); L 1–3	

Women

Athlete	Event	Round of 16	Quarterfinal	Semifinal	Repechage	Final / BM	
Athlete	Event	Opposition Result	Opposition Result	Opposition Result	Opposition Result	Opposition Result	Rank
Mariya Stadnyk	Women's 48kg	Santos (POR); W 12–2	Sabatié (FRA); W 11–0	Matkowska (POL); W 8–2	—N/a	Yankova (BUL); W 12–1	1st place, gold medalist(s)
Anzhela Dorogan	Women's 53kg	Kenger (TUR); W 8–2	Dénes (HUN); W 4–0	Budu (MDA); W 7–4	—N/a	Zasina (POL); W 3–2	1st place, gold medalist(s)
Nataliya Synyshyn	Women's 55kg	Liuzzi (ITA); W 10–0	Gün (TUR); W 12–0	Mattsson (SWE); L 5–6	—N/a	Kit (UKR); W 10–0	3rd place, bronze medalist(s)
Irina Netreba	Women's 58kg	Rainero (ITA); W 8–4	Hristova (BUL); W 6–4	Barka (HUN); L 2–5	—N/a	Bullen (NOR); L 0–4	=5
Yuliya Ratkevich	Women's 60kg	Yusein (BUL); L 4–14	Did not advance				
Elmira Gambarova	Women's 63kg	Johansson (SWE); L 0–4	Did not advance				
Nadiia Mushka	Women's 69kg	Vorobieva (RUS); L 0–7	Did not advance				
Gozal Zutova	Women's 75kg	Vashchuk (UKR); L 2–4	Did not advance				
