= Sambo at the 2015 European Games – Women's 68 kg =

Sambo competitions

Women's 68 kg at the 2015 European Games
- Venue: Heydar Aliyev Arena
- Date: 22 June
- Competitors: 9 from 9 nations

Medalists
gold medal	Ivana Jandrić	Serbia
silver medal	Volha Namazava	Belarus
bronze medal	Céline Condé	France
bronze medal	Olga Zakhartsova	Russia

Women's 68 kg competition at the 2015 European Games in Baku, Azerbaijan, took place on 22 June at the Heydar Aliyev Arena.

== Schedule ==
All times are Azerbaijan Summer Time (UTC+05:00)

Date	Time	Event
Monday, 22 June 2015	10:00	1/8 finals
Monday, 22 June 2015	10:30	Quarterfinals
Monday, 22 June 2015	11:15	Semifinals
Monday, 22 June 2015	19:00	Repechage
Monday, 22 June 2015	19:30	Finals

== Results ==
1/8 finals
Céline Condé (FRA)	3
Tea Sukhitashvili (GEO)	1

Quarterfinals
Céline Condé (FRA)	3
Gabriela Gigova (BUL)	1
Narmina Alizada (AZE)	0
Volha Namazava (BLR)	4
Nadiya Gerasymenko (UKR)	1
Olga Zakhartsova (RUS)	3
Natalia Repesco (MDA)	0
Ivana Jandrić (SRB)	4

Semifinals
Céline Condé (FRA)	0
Volha Namazava (BLR)	4
Olga Zakhartsova (RUS)	0
Ivana Jandrić (SRB)	4

Final
Volha Namazava (BLR)	0
Ivana Jandrić (SRB)	2

=== Repechage ===
Bronze medal match
Narmina Alizada (AZE)	0
Céline Condé (FRA)	4
Natalia Repesco (MDA)	0
Olga Zakhartsova (RUS)	4
