= Wrestling at the 2015 European Games – Men's freestyle 57 kg =

Men's freestyle 57 kg at the 2015 European Games
- Venue: Heydar Aliyev Arena
- Date: 17 June
- Competitors: 17 from 17 nations

Medalists
| gold medal | Viktor Lebedev | Russia |
| silver medal | Marcel Ewald | Germany |
| bronze medal | Alexandru Chirtoacă | Moldova |
| bronze medal | Sezar Akgül | Turkey |

Men's freestyle 57 kg competition at the 2015 European Games in Baku, Azerbaijan, took place on 17 June at the Heydar Aliyev Arena.

== Schedule ==
All times are Azerbaijan Summer Time (UTC+05:00)

| Date | Time | Event |
|---|---|---|
| Wednesday, 17 June 2015 | 10:00 | Qualifications |
| Wednesday, 17 June 2015 | 11:00 | 1/8 finals |
| Wednesday, 17 June 2015 | 13:00 | Quarterfinals |
| Wednesday, 17 June 2015 | 13:00 | Semifinals |
| Wednesday, 17 June 2015 | 15:00 | Repechage |
| Wednesday, 17 June 2015 | 19:00 | Finals |

== Results ==
Legend

- DSQ — Disqualified
- F — Won by fall

=== Final ===
| Final |
| Marcel Ewald (GER) | 0 |
| Viktor Lebedev (RUS) | 8 |

=== Top half ===
Qualifications

1/8 finals
Uladzislau Andreyeu (BLR) | 11
Levan Metreveli (ESP) | 1
Marcel Ewald (GER) | 4
Alexandru Chirtoacă (MDA) | 3
Andrei Dukov (ROU) | 0
Vladimer Khinchegashvili (GEO) | 3
Kastriot Sedolli (KOS) | 2
Islam Islamaj (ALB) | 4^{F}

Quarterfinals
Uladzislau Andreyeu (BLR) | 12
Marcel Ewald (GER) | 0
Vladimer Khinchegashvili (GEO) | 10
Islam Islamaj (ALB) | 0

Semifinals
~~Uladzislau Andreyeu (BLR)~~ | 2^{DSQ}
~~Vladimer Khinchegashvili (GEO)~~ | 1^{DSQ}

| Semifinal (Additional) |
| Marcel Ewald (GER) | 10 |
| Islam Islamaj (ALB) | 0 |

^{D} Andreyeu and Khinchegashvili originally won their quarterfinal bouts, but were ejected from the competition after their semi-final ended in a double disqualification due to the match degenerating into a brawl. Accordingly, both Ewald and Islamaj, who they had defeated, were reinstated.

=== Bottom half ===
Qualifications
Aleksei Baskakov (EST) | 8
Theocharis Kalanidis (GRE) | 2

1/8 finals
Garik Barseghyan (ARM) | 4
Vladimir Dubov (BUL) | 0
Yashar Aliyev (AZE) | 9
Zoheir El-Ouarraqe (FRA) | 4
Viktor Lebedev (RUS) | 10
Taras Markovych (UKR) | 0
Sezar Akgül (TUR) | 6
Aleksei Baskakov (EST) | 0

Quarterfinals
Garik Barseghyan (ARM) | 6
Yashar Aliyev (AZE) | 10
Viktor Lebedev (RUS) | 6
Sezar Akgül (TUR) | 3

Semifinals
Yashar Aliyev (AZE) | 1
Viktor Lebedev (RUS) | 3

=== Repechage ===
Repechage round 1
Taras Markovych (UKR) | 7
Sezar Akgül (TUR) | 7

Bronze medal match
Alexandru Chirtoacă (MDA) | 10
Islam Islamaj (ALB) | 0
Sezar Akgül (TUR) | 8^{F}
Yashar Aliyev (AZE) | 3
