= Sambo at the 2015 European Games – Men's +100 kg =

Sambo competitions

Men's +100 kg at the 2015 European Games
- Venue: Heydar Aliyev Arena
- Date: 22 June
- Competitors: 8 from 8 nations

Medalists
gold medal	Artem Osipenko	Russia
silver medal	Vasif Safarbayov	Azerbaijan
bronze medal	Yury Rybak	Belarus
bronze medal	Razmik Tonoyan	Ukraine

Men's +100 kg competition at the 2015 European Games in Baku, Azerbaijan, took place on 22 June at the Heydar Aliyev Arena.

== Schedule ==
All times are Azerbaijan Summer Time (UTC+05:00)

Date	Time	Event
Monday, 22 June 2015	10:30	Quarterfinals
Monday, 22 June 2015	11:15	Semifinals
Monday, 22 June 2015	19:00	Repechage
Monday, 22 June 2015	19:30	Finals

== Results ==
Quarterfinals		Semifinals		Final
Radu Malcic (ROU)	0
Artem Osipenko (RUS)	4	Artem Osipenko (RUS)	4
Nodar Metreveli (GEO)	0	Yury Rybak (BLR)	0
Yury Rybak (BLR)	4			Artem Osipenko (RUS)	4
Kevin Rasit Cekic (AUT)	0			Vasif Safarbayov (AZE)	0
Razmik Tonoyan (UKR)	4	Razmik Tonoyan (UKR)	0
Vasif Safarbayov (AZE)	4	Vasif Safarbayov (AZE)	2
Bajro Mashovikj (MKD)	0

=== Repechage ===
Bronze medal match
Radu Malcic (ROU)	1
Yury Rybak (BLR)	3
Bajro Mashovikj (MKD)	0
Razmik Tonoyan (UKR)	4
