= Sambo at the 2015 European Games – Women's 52 kg =

Sambo competitions

Women's 52 kg at the 2015 European Games
- Venue: Heydar Aliyev Arena
- Date: 22 June
- Competitors: 8 from 8 nations

Medalists
gold medal	Anna Kharitonova	Russia
silver medal	Nazakat Khalilova	Azerbaijan
bronze medal	Rūta Aksionova	Lithuania
bronze medal	Magdalena Varbanova	Bulgaria

Women's 52 kg competition at the 2015 European Games in Baku, Azerbaijan, took place on 22 June at the Heydar Aliyev Arena.

== Schedule ==
All times are Azerbaijan Summer Time (UTC+05:00)

Date	Time	Event
Monday, 22 June 2015	10:30	Quarterfinals
Monday, 22 June 2015	11:15	Semifinals
Monday, 22 June 2015	19:00	Repechage
Monday, 22 June 2015	19:30	Finals

== Results ==
Quarterfinals		Semifinals		Final
Rūta Aksionova (LTU)	4
Alesia Staraverava (BLR)	0	Rūta Aksionova (LTU)	0
Codrina Ionescu (ROU)	1	Nazakat Khalilova (AZE)	4
Nazakat Khalilova (AZE)	3			Nazakat Khalilova (AZE)	0
Anna Kharitonova (RUS)	4			Anna Kharitonova (RUS)	4
Sose Balasanyan (ARM)	0	Anna Kharitonova (RUS)	3
Estelle Friquin (FRA)	1	Magdalena Varbanova (BUL)	1
Magdalena Varbanova (BUL)	3

=== Repechage ===
Bronze medal match
Codrina Ionescu (ROU)	1
Rūta Aksionova (LTU)	3
Sose Balasanyan (ARM)	0
Magdalena Varbanova (BUL)	2
