= Gymnastics at the 2015 European Games – Women's rhythmic individual all-around =

Women's rhythmic individual all-around at the 2015 European Games
- Venue: National Gymnastics Arena
- Dates: 19 June 2015
- Competitors: 20 from 13 nations

Medalists
gold medal	Yana Kudryavtseva	Russia
silver medal	Margarita Mamun	Russia
bronze medal	Melitina Staniouta	Belarus

The Women's rhythmic gymnastics individual all-around competition at the 2015 European Games was held in the National Gymnastics Arena, Baku on 19 June 2015.

== Results ==
Rank	Gymnast	Nation	Hoop (rhythmic gymnastics)	Ball (rhythmic gymnastics)	Clubs (rhythmic gymnastics)	Ribbon (rhythmic gymnastics)	Total
1st place, gold medalist(s)	Yana Kudryavtseva	Russia	18.850	19.100	19.050	19.100	76.100
2nd place, silver medalist(s)	Margarita Mamun	Russia	18.900	18.950	18.850	18.950	75.650
3rd place, bronze medalist(s)	Melitina Staniouta	Belarus	18.300	18.200	18.300	18.300	73.100
4	Ganna Rizatdinova	Ukraine	18.300	18.050	18.150	18.250	72.750
5	Salome Pazhava	Georgia	18.150	18.000	17.850	17.900	71.900
6	Katsiaryna Halkina	Belarus	17.900	18.000	18.000	17.250	71.150
7	Kseniya Moustafaeva	France	17.700	17.750	17.000	17.650	70.100
8	Marina Durunda	Azerbaijan	18.100	17.900	16.050	17.800	69.850
9	Neta Rivkin	Israel	17.800	18.050	15.900	18.050	69.800
10	Victoria Veinberg Filanovsky	Israel	17.700	17.250	17.300	17.300	69.550
11	Nicol Ruprecht	Austria	17.300	17.300	17.450	17.350	69.400
12	Neviana Vladinova	Bulgaria	17.100	17.450	17.350	17.450	69.350
13	Carolina Rodriguez	Spain	17.200	17.200	16.750	17.050	68.200
14	Varvara Filiou	Greece	15.450	17.550	16.950	17.500	67.450
15	Ayshan Bayramova	Azerbaijan	17.000	15.900	17.050	16.450	66.400
16	Eleonora Romanova	Ukraine	16.850	15.450	16.950	17.000	66.250
17	Mariya Mateva	Bulgaria	17.300	16.800	16.100	16.000	66.200
18	Ana Luiza Filiorianu	Romania	16.600	16.450	16.100	15.700	64.850
19	Natascha Wegscheider	Austria	15.900	16.100	16.150	15.950	64.100
20	Dora Vass	Hungary	16.400	15.300	16.400	15.950	64.050
