= Wrestling at the 2015 European Games – Women's freestyle 60 kg =

Women's freestyle 60 kg at the 2015 European Games
- Venue: Heydar Aliyev Arena
- Date: 15 June
- Competitors: 11 from 11 nations

Medalists
gold medal	Marianna Sastin	Hungary
silver medal	Svetlana Lipatova	Russia
bronze medal	Veranika Ivanova	Belarus
bronze medal	Taybe Yusein	Bulgaria

Women's freestyle 60 kg competition at the 2015 European Games in Baku, Azerbaijan, took place on 15 June at the Heydar Aliyev Arena.

== Schedule ==
All times are Azerbaijan Summer Time (UTC+05:00)

Date	Time	Event
Monday, 15 June 2015	11:00	1/8 finals
Monday, 15 June 2015	13:00	Quarterfinals
Monday, 15 June 2015	13:00	Semifinals
Monday, 15 June 2015	15:00	Repechage
Monday, 15 June 2015	19:00	Finals

== Results ==
Legend

- F — Won by fall

1/8 finals
(Sweden) Johanna Mattsson (SWE)	2
(Turkey) Hafize Şahin (TUR)	1
(Azerbaijan) Yuliya Ratkevich (AZE)	4
(Bulgaria) Taybe Yusein (BUL)	14
(Hungary) Marianna Sastin (HUN)	14
(Romania) Anca Petrea (ROU)	3

Quarterfinals
(Lithuania) Giedrė Blekaitytė (LTU)	6^{F}
(Austria) Sabrina Seidl (AUT)	0
(Russia) Svetlana Lipatova (RUS)	12
(Belarus) Veranika Ivanova (BLR)	1
(Ukraine) Oksana Herhel (UKR)	3
(Sweden) Johanna Mattsson (SWE)	2
(Bulgaria) Taybe Yusein (BUL)	4
(Hungary) Marianna Sastin (HUN)	4

Semifinals
(Lithuania) Giedrė Blekaitytė (LTU)	0
(Russia) Svetlana Lipatova (RUS)	12
(Ukraine) Oksana Herhel (UKR)	2
(Hungary) Marianna Sastin (HUN)	13

Final
(Russia) Svetlana Lipatova (RUS)	0
(Hungary) Marianna Sastin (HUN)	7

=== Repechage ===
Repechage round 1
(Romania) Anca Petrea (ROU)	0
(Bulgaria) Taybe Yusein (BUL)	6^{F}

Bronze medal match
(Belarus) Veranika Ivanova (BLR)	6^{F}
(Lithuania) Giedrė Blekaitytė (LTU)	2
(Bulgaria) Taybe Yusein (BUL)	5
(Ukraine) Oksana Herhel (UKR)	4
