= Sambo at the 2015 European Games – Women's 60 kg =

Sambo competitions

Women's 60 kg at the 2015 European Games
- Venue: Heydar Aliyev Arena
- Date: 22 June
- Competitors: 9 from 9 nations

Medalists
gold medal	Yana Kostenko	Russia
silver medal	Kalina Stefanova	Bulgaria
bronze medal	Katsiaryna Prakapenka	Belarus
bronze medal	Daniela Hondiu	Romania

The Women's 60 kg competition at the 2015 European Games in Baku, Azerbaijan, took place on 22 June at the Heydar Aliyev Arena.

== Schedule ==
All times are Azerbaijan Summer Time (UTC+05:00)

Date	Time	Event
Monday, 22 June 2015	10:00	1/8 finals
Monday, 22 June 2015	10:30	Quarterfinals
Monday, 22 June 2015	11:15	Semifinals
Monday, 22 June 2015	19:00	Repechage
Monday, 22 June 2015	19:30	Finals

== Results ==
1/8 finals
Yana Kostenko (RUS)	4
Shorena Sharadze (GEO)	0

Quarterfinals
Yana Kostenko (RUS)	4
Shahane Huseynova (AZE)	0
Ana Repida (MDA)	0
Katsiaryna Prakapenka (BLR)	2
Yaiza Jiménez (ESP)	0
Kalina Stefanova (BUL)	4
Kahal Shafrir (ISR)	0
Daniela Hondiu (ROU)	4

Semifinals
Yana Kostenko (RUS)	2
Katsiaryna Prakapenka (BLR)	0
Kalina Stefanova (BUL)	2
Daniela Hondiu (ROU)	0

Final
Yana Kostenko (RUS)	4
Kalina Stefanova (BUL)	0

=== Repechage ===
Repechage round 1
Shorena Sharadze (GEO)	0
Shahane Huseynova (AZE)	2

Bronze medal match
Shahane Huseynova (AZE)	0
Katsiaryna Prakapenka (BLR)	4
Yaiza Jiménez (ESP)	0
Daniela Hondiu (ROU)	4
