= Wrestling at the 2015 European Games – Men's freestyle 61 kg =

Men's freestyle 61 kg at the 2015 European Games
- Venue: Heydar Aliyev Arena
- Date: 18 June
- Competitors: 15 from 15 nations

Medalists
gold medal	Aleksandr Bogomoev	Russia
silver medal	Beka Lomtadze	Georgia
bronze medal	Haji Aliyev	Azerbaijan
bronze medal	Vasyl Shuptar	Ukraine

Men's freestyle 61 kg competition at the 2015 European Games in Baku, Azerbaijan, took place on 18 June at the Heydar Aliyev Arena.

== Schedule ==
All times are Azerbaijan Summer Time (UTC+05:00)

Date	Time	Event
Tuesday, 18 June 2015	11:00	1/8 finals
Tuesday, 18 June 2015	13:00	Quarterfinals
Tuesday, 18 June 2015	13:00	Semifinals
Tuesday, 18 June 2015	15:00	Repechage
Tuesday, 18 June 2015	19:00	Finals

== Results ==
Legend

- F — Won by fall

1/8 finals
Münir Recep Aktaş (TUR)	7
Dzianis Maksimau (BLR)	3
Valodya Frangulyan (ARM)	0
Haji Aliyev (AZE)	7
Andrei Perpeliţă (MDA)	1
Mykola Bolotňuk (SVK)	14
Krzysztof Bieńkowski (POL)	4
Jasin Redjalari (MKD)	5
Radoslav Velikov (BUL)	12
Šarūnas Jurčys (LTU)	2
Ivan Guidea (ROU)	10
József Molnár (HUN)	0
Beka Lomtadze (GEO)	12
Vasyl Shuptar (UKR)	1

Quarterfinals
Aleksandr Bogomoev (RUS)	4
Münir Recep Aktaş (TUR)	0
Haji Aliyev (AZE)	11
Mykola Bolotňuk (SVK)	0
Jasin Redjalari (MKD)	1
Radoslav Velikov (BUL)	3
Ivan Guidea (ROU)	8
Beka Lomtadze (GEO)	10

Semifinals
Aleksandr Bogomoev (RUS)	5
Haji Aliyev (AZE)	2
Radoslav Velikov (BUL)	0
Beka Lomtadze (GEO)	10

Final
Aleksandr Bogomoev (RUS)	13
Beka Lomtadze (GEO)	8

=== Repechage ===
Repechage round 1
Vasyl Shuptar (UKR)	6
Ivan Guidea (ROU)	2

Bronze medal match
Münir Recep Aktaş (TUR)	2
Haji Aliyev (AZE)	10
Vasyl Shuptar (UKR)	11
Radoslav Velikov (BUL)	0
