= Gymnastics at the 2015 European Games – Men's trampoline =

Sports game series

Men's trampoline at the 2015 European Games
- Venue: National Gymnastics Arena
- Date: 17, 21 June
- Competitors: 27 from 16 nations
- Winning score: 60.090

Medalists
gold medal	Dmitry Ushakov	Russia
silver medal	Uladzislau Hancharou	Belarus
bronze medal	Ilya Grishunin	Azerbaijan

The men's trampoline competition at the 2015 European Games was held at the National Gymnastics Arena on 17 and 21 June 2015.

== Qualification ==
The top six gymnasts with one per country advanced to the final.

Rank	Gymnast	Routine 1	Routine 2	Total	Qual.
1	Allan Morante (FRA)	49.195	56.865	106.060	Q
2	Uladzislau Hancharou (BLR)	49.540	56.460	106.000	Q
3	Dmitry Ushakov (RUS)	48.110	56.865	104.975	Q
4	Sébastien Martiny (FRA)	48.315	56.605	104.920	
5	Ilya Grishunin (AZE)	48.455	56.185	104.640	Q
6	Tengizi Koshkadze (GEO)	49.160	55.430	104.590	Q
7	Diogo Ganchinho (POR)	47.885	56.570	104.455	Q
8	Dmytro Byedyevkin (UKR)	48.135	56.190	104.325	R1
9	Oleg Piunov (AZE)	47.775	55.875	103.650	
10	Ricardo Santos (POR)	47.790	55.575	103.365	
11	Nicolas Schori (SUI)	47.620	54.845	102.465	R2
12	Bartłomiej Hes (POL)	46.900	55.480	102.380	
13	Mykola Prostorov (UKR)	47.065	55.000	102.065	
14	Flavio Cannone (ITA)	47.635	52.815	100.450	
15	Naim Ashhab (CZE)	52.815	53.920	99.350	
16	Martin Pelc (CZE)	47.210	49.485	96.695	
17	Apostolos Koutavas (GRE)	46.655	49.095	95.750	
18	Ben Van Overberghe (BEL)	41.025	51.730	92.755	
19	Måns Åberg (SWE)	41.505	50.500	92.005	
20	Jonas Nordfors (SWE)	47.675	44.280	91.955	
21	Mikhail Melnik (RUS)	48.720	41.385	90.105	
22	Łukasz Tomaszewski (POL)	47.405	39.225	86.630	
23	Martin Gromowski (GER)	45.500	39.540	85.040	
24	Mikalai Kazak (BLR)	46.620	23.605	70.225	
25	Simon Progin (SUI)	47.880	17.050	64.930	
26	Kyrylo Sonn (GER)	47.530	12.150	59.680	
27	Luke Strong (GBR)	45.550	6.500	52.050	

== Final ==
Rank	Gymnast	D Score	E Score	ToF Score	Penalty	Total
1st place, gold medalist(s)	Dmitry Ushakov (RUS)	17.100	25.200	17.790		60.090
2nd place, silver medalist(s)	Uladzislau Hancharou (BLR)	17.100	24.300	17.980		59.380
3rd place, bronze medalist(s)	Ilya Grishunin (AZE)	16.400	24.900	17.465		58.765
4	Allan Morante (FRA)	16.200	22.800	17.700		56.700
5	Tengizi Koshkadze (GEO)	7.100	9.000	7.290		23.390
6	Diogo Ganchinho (POR)	4.000	5.400	3.845		13.245
