= Sambo at the 2015 European Games – Women's 64 kg =

Sambo competitions

Women's 64 kg at the 2015 European Games
- Venue: Heydar Aliyev Arena
- Date: 22 June
- Competitors: 8 from 8 nations

Medalists
gold medal	Tatsiana Matsko	Belarus
silver medal	Olena Sayko	Ukraine
bronze medal	Sarah Loko	France
bronze medal	Anna Shcherbakova	Russia

Women's 64 kg competition at the 2015 European Games in Baku, Azerbaijan, took place on 22 June at Heydar Aliyev Arena.

== Schedule ==
All times are Azerbaijan Summer Time (UTC+05:00)

Date	Time	Event
Monday, 22 June 2015	10:30	Quarterfinals
Monday, 22 June 2015	11:15	Semifinals
Monday, 22 June 2015	19:00	Repechage
Monday, 22 June 2015	19:30	Finals

== Results ==
Quarterfinals		Semifinals	Final
Farida Gurbanova (AZE)	0
Ecaterina Cretu (MDA)	4	Ecaterina Cretu (MDA)
Sarah Loko (FRA)	1	Olena Sayko (UKR)
Olena Sayko (UKR)	3		Olena Sayko (UKR)	0
Anna Shcherbakova (RUS)	3		Tatsiana Matsko (BLR)	2
Natalia Budeanu (ROU)	1	Anna Shcherbakova (RUS)
Vany Ivanova (BUL)	1	Tatsiana Matsko (BLR)
Tatsiana Matsko (BLR)	3

=== Repechage ===
Bronze medal match
Sarah Loko (FRA)	4
Ecaterina Cretu (MDA)	0
Vany Ivanova (BUL)	1
Anna Shcherbakova (RUS)	3
