= Sambo at the 2015 European Games – Men's 57 kg =

Sambo competitions

Men's 57 kg at the 2015 European Games
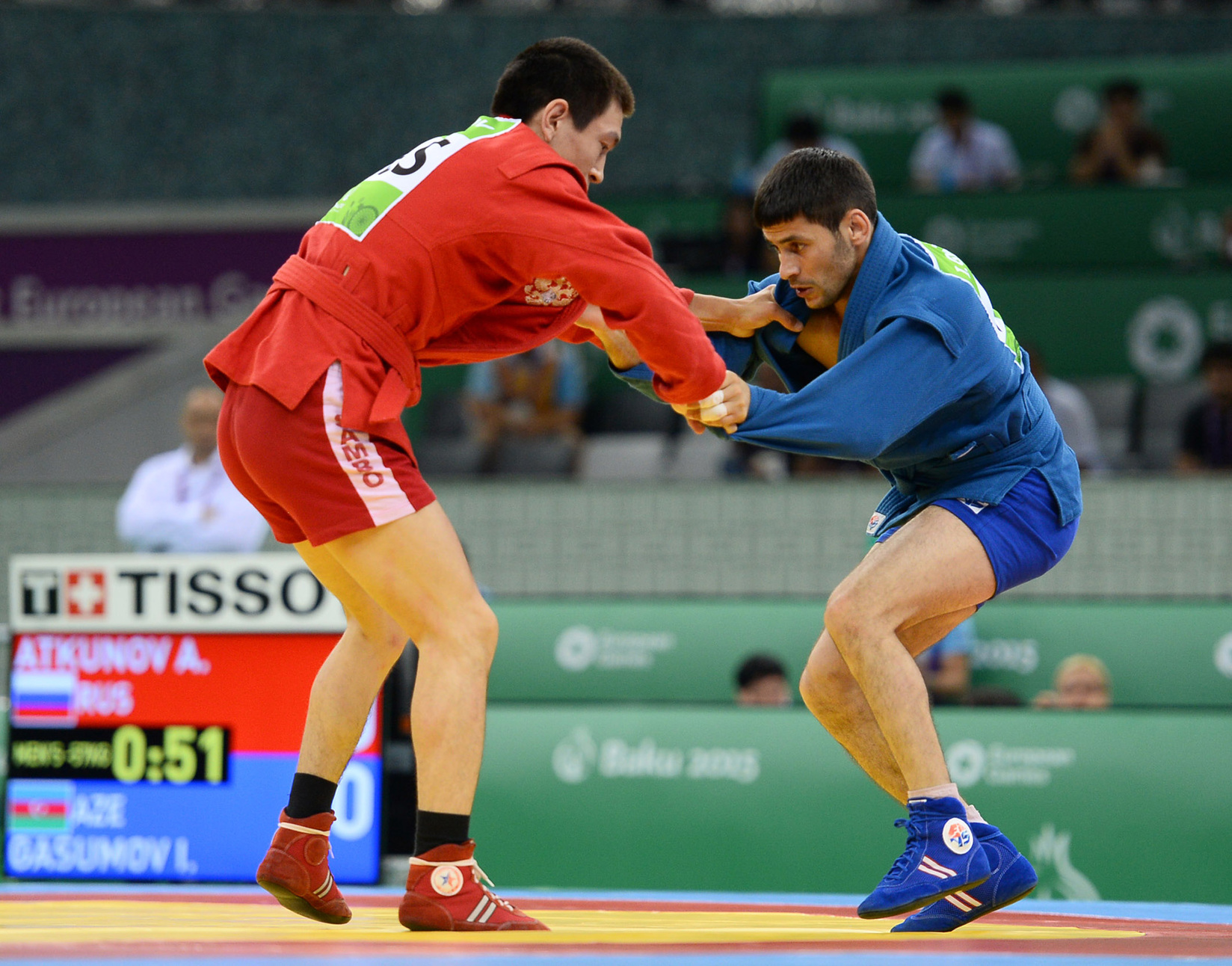
- The final.
- Venue: Heydar Aliyev Arena
- Date: 22 June
- Competitors: 8 from 8 nations

Medalists
gold medal	Aymergen Atkunov	Russia
silver medal	Islam Gasumov	Azerbaijan
bronze medal	Uladzislau Burdz	Belarus
bronze medal	Vakhtangi Chidrashvili	Georgia

Men's 57 kg competition at the 2015 European Games in Baku, Azerbaijan, took place on 22 June at the Heydar Aliyev Arena.

== Schedule ==
All times are Azerbaijan Summer Time (UTC+05:00)

Date	Time	Event
Tuesday, 16 June 2015	10:30	Quarterfinals
Tuesday, 16 June 2015	11:15	Semifinals
Tuesday, 16 June 2015	19:00	Repechage
Tuesday, 16 June 2015	19:30	Finals

== Results ==
Quarterfinals		Semifinals		Final
Aymergen Atkunov (RUS)	4
Tigran Kirakosyan (ARM)	0	Aymergen Atkunov (RUS)	3
Oleksii Poltavtsev (UKR)	0	Uladzislau Burdz (BLR)	1
Uladzislau Burdz (BLR)	4			Aymergen Atkunov (RUS)	4
Borislav Yanakov (BUL)	0			Islam Gasumov (AZE)	0
Vakhtangi Chidrashvili (GEO)	4	Vakhtangi Chidrashvili (GEO)	1
Orlando Gruia (ROU)	0	Islam Gasumov (AZE)	3
Islam Gasumov (AZE)	4

=== Repechage ===
Bronze medal match
Tigran Kirakosyan (ARM)	1
Uladzislau Burdz (BLR)	3
Orlando Gruia (ROU)	0
Vakhtangi Chidrashvili (GEO)	4
