= Gymnastics at the 2015 European Games – Women's rhythmic individual hoop =

Women's rhythmic individual hoop at the 2015 European Games
- Venue: National Gymnastics Arena
- Date: 21 June
- Competitors: 6 from 6 nations
- Winning score: 18.850

Medalists
gold medal	Margarita Mamun	Russia
silver medal	Melitina Staniouta	Belarus
bronze medal	Neta Rivkin	Israel

The women's rhythmic individual hoop competition at the 2015 European Games was held at the National Gymnastics Arena on 21 June 2015. The six best results from the All-Around Final qualified in the Final, with one gymnast allowed per country.

== Results ==
Rank	Gymnast	D Score	E Score	Pen.	Total
1st place, gold medalist(s)	Margarita Mamun (RUS)	9.350	9.500		18.850
2nd place, silver medalist(s)	Melitina Staniouta (BLR)	9.200	9.30		18.500
3rd place, bronze medalist(s)	Neta Rivkin (ISR)	8.950	9.200		18.150
4	Salome Pazhava (GEO)	8.850	9.200		18.050
5	Marina Durunda (AZE)	8.800	9.000		17.800
6	Ganna Rizatdinova (UKR)	7.400	8.550	0.05	15.900
