= Sambo at the 2015 European Games – Men's 74 kg =

Sambo competitions

Men's 74 kg at the 2015 European Games
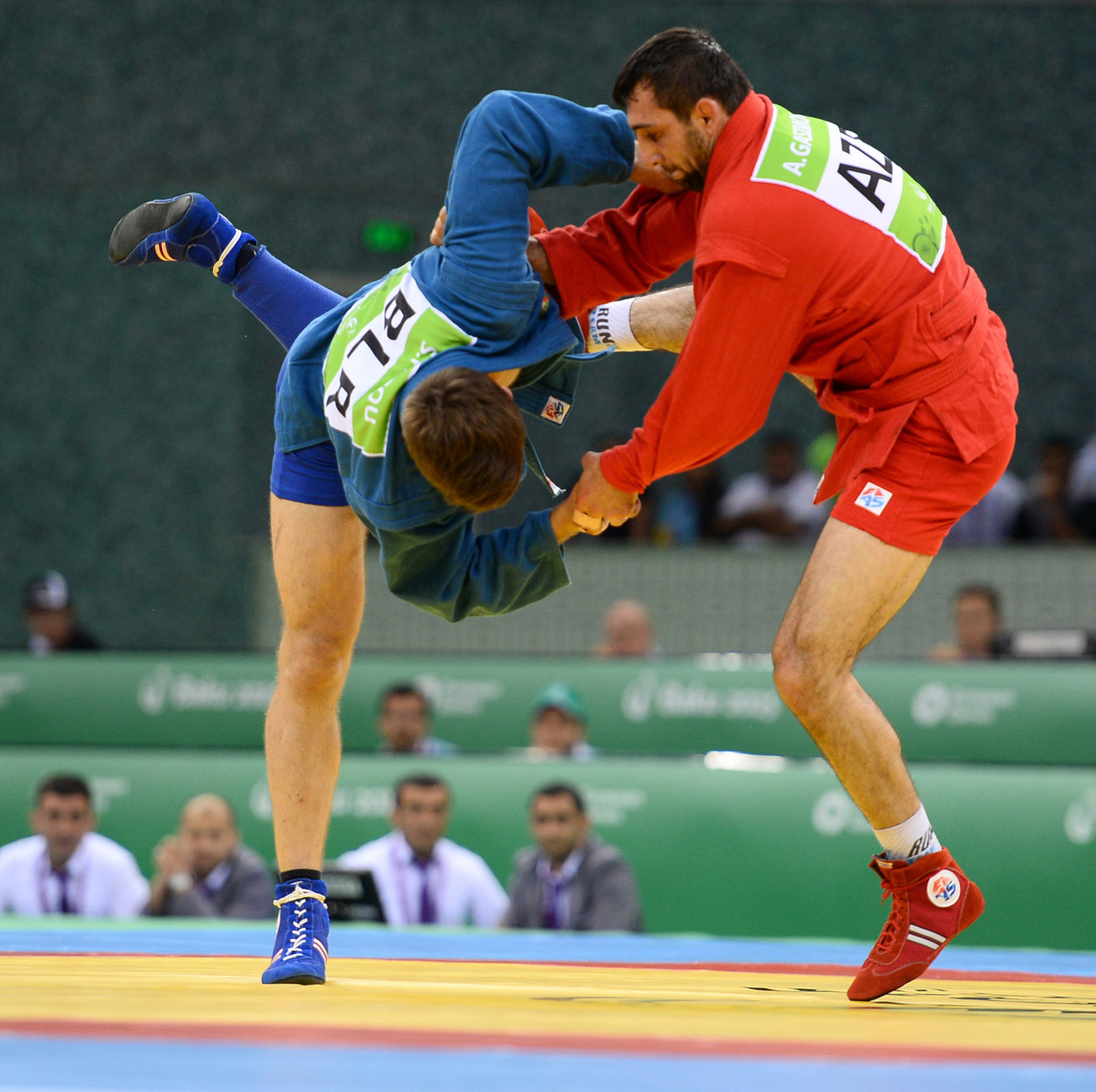
- The final
- Venue: Heydar Aliyev Arena
- Date: 22 June
- Competitors: 14 from 14 nations

Medalists
gold medal	Stsiapan Papou	Belarus
silver medal	Amil Gasimov	Azerbaijan
bronze medal	Kakha Mamulashvili	Georgia
bronze medal	Azamat Sidakov	Russia

Men's 74 kg competition at the 2015 European Games in Baku, Azerbaijan, took place on 22 June at the Heydar Aliyev Arena.

== Schedule ==
All times are Azerbaijan Summer Time (UTC+05:00)

Date	Time	Event
Monday, 22 June 2015	10:00	1/8 finals
Monday, 22 June 2015	10:30	Quarterfinals
Monday, 22 June 2015	11:15	Semifinals
Monday, 22 June 2015	19:00	Repechage
Monday, 22 June 2015	19:30	Finals

== Results ==
1/8 finals
Martin Ivanov (BUL)	3
Mirmanis Iliadis (GRE)	1
Jordan Amoros (FRA)	3
Muhammet Karataş (TUR)	1
Tadej Čutuk (SLO)	0
Kakha Mamulashvili (GEO)	4
Artūrs Čerņavskis (LAT)	1
Valentin Damian (ROU)	3
Stsiapan Papou (BLR)	4
Sebastian Cieślik (POL)	0
Azamat Sidakov (RUS)	3
Luis Menéndez Rubiera (ESP)	1

Quarterfinals
Martin Ivanov (BUL)	3
Jordan Amoros (FRA)	1
Kakha Mamulashvili (GEO)	1
Amil Gasimov (AZE)	3
Valentin Damian (ROU)	0
Stsiapan Papou (BLR)	4
Azamat Sidakov (RUS)	3
Dmytro Babiichuk (UKR)	1

Semifinals
Martin Ivanov (BUL)	1
Amil Gasimov (AZE)	3
Stsiapan Papou (BLR)	3
Azamat Sidakov (RUS)	1

Final
Amil Gasimov (AZE)	0
Stsiapan Papou (BLR)	4

=== Repechage ===
Repechage round 1
Sebastian Cieślik (POL)	1
Valentin Damian (ROU)	3

Bronze medal match
Kakha Mamulashvili (GEO)	3
Martin Ivanov (BUL)	1
Valentin Damian (ROU)	0
Azamat Sidakov (RUS)	4
