= Armenia at the 2015 European Games =

- IOC code: ARM
- NOC: Armenian Olympic Committee
- Website: www.armnoc.am

in Baku, Azerbaijan 12 – 28 June 2015
- Competitors: 25 in 7 sports
- Flag bearer: Hrachya Rostomyan
- Medals Ranked 36th: Gold 0 Silver 1 Bronze 0 Total 1

European Games appearances (overview)
- 2015; 2019; 2023; 2027

Armenia competed at the 2015 European Games, in Baku, Azerbaijan from 12 to 28 June 2015.

An exception to the restrictions on entry into Azerbaijan was made for these games, see Armenian ethnicity.

== Medalist ==
Medal	Name	Sport	Event	Date
Silver	Mihran Harutyunyan	Wrestling	Men's Greco-Roman 66 kg	14 June

Medals by sport
Sport	1st place, gold medalist(s)	2nd place, silver medalist(s)	3rd place, bronze medalist(s)	Total
Wrestling	0	1	0	1
Total	0	1	0	1

== Team ==
Competitors from Armenia per sport
Sport	Men	Women	Total
Boxing	6	0	6
Judo	2	1	3
Sambo	2	1	3
Taekwondo	1	0	1
Wrestling	10	0	10
Total	23	2	25

== Boxing ==
Athlete	Event	Round of 32	Round of 16	Quarterfinals	Semifinals	Final	
Athlete	Event	Opposition Result	Opposition Result	Opposition Result	Opposition Result	Opposition Result	Rank
Artyom Aleksayan	Men's 49kg	Bye	Alaverdian (ISR); L 0–3	did not advance			
Narek Abgaryan	Men's 52kg	Bye	Csóka (HUN); W 2–1	Tankó (SVK); L 1–2	did not advance		
Aram Avagyan	Men's 56kg	Bye	Ivanov (BUL); L 1–2	did not advance			
Samvel Barseghyan	Men's 60kg	Bye	Dimitrov (BUL); L 0–3	did not advance			
Hovhannes Bachkov	Men's 64kg	Bye	Petrov (UKR); L 0–3	did not advance			
Nikol Arutyunov	Men's 81kg	Kuliński (POL); L 0–3	did not advance				

== Judo ==
Athlete	Event	Round of 32	Round of 16	Quarterfinals	Semifinals	Repechage	Final / BM	
Athlete	Event	Opposition Result	Opposition Result	Opposition Result	Opposition Result	Opposition Result	Opposition Result	Rank
Hovhannes Davtyan	Men's 60kg	Bye	Trbovc (SLO); W 010–000	Garrigós (ESP); L 000–000	—N/a	Chammartin (SUI); L 000–011	did not advance	
Davit Nikoghosyan	Men's 73kg	Bye	Muki (ISR); L 000–100	did not advance				
Zhanna Stankevich	Women's 52kg	Edwards (GBR); L 000–001	did not advance					

== Sambo ==
Athlete	Event	Quarterfinals	Semifinals	Repechage	Final / BM	
Athlete	Event	Opposition Result	Opposition Result	Opposition Result	Opposition Result	Rank
Tigran Kirakosyan	Men's 57kg	Atkunov (RUS); L 0–4	—N/a	Burdz (BLR); L 1–3	did not advance	
Ashot Danielyan	Men's 90kg	Meleaschevici (MDA); W 4–2	Kazusionak (BLR); L 1–3	Matukas (LTU); L 0–2	did not advance	
Sose Balasanyan	Women's 52kg	Kharitonova (RUS); L 0-4	—N/a	Varbanova (BUL); L 0–2	did not advance	

== Taekwondo ==
Athlete	Event	Round of 16	Quarterfinals	Semifinals	Repechage	Final / BM	
Athlete	Event	Opposition Result	Opposition Result	Opposition Result	Opposition Result	Opposition Result	Rank
Arman Yeremyan	Men's 80kg	Sarı (TUR); W 4–2	Gaun (RUS); L 2–5	—N/a	Ordemann (NOR); L 4–8	did not advance	

== Wrestling ==
=== Freestyle ===
Athlete	Event	Qualification	Round of 16	Quarterfinals	Semifinals	Repechage	Final / BM	
Athlete	Event	Opposition Result	Opposition Result	Opposition Result	Opposition Result	Opposition Result	Opposition Result	Rank
Garik Barseghyan	Men's 57kg	Bye	Dubov (BUL); W 4–0	Y Aliyev (AZE); L 6–10	did not advance			
Valodya Frangulyan	Men's 61kg	Bye	Haj Aliyev (AZE); L 0–7	did not advance				
David Safaryan	Men's 65kg	Mitrov (MKD); W 2–2	Novachkov (BUL); L 6–8	did not advance				
Grigor Grigoryan	Men's 74kg	Bye	Terziev (BUL); L 8–11	did not advance				
Musa Murtazaliev	Men's 86kg	Bilici (TUR); W 5–4	Friev (ESP); W 3–2	Aminashvili (GEO); L 1–4	did not advance			
Levan Berianidze	Men's 125kg	Bye	Gatsalov (RUS); W 7–2	Shemarov (BLR); L 0–5	—N/a	Matuhin (GER); W 3–3	Petriashvili (GEO); L 0–5	=5

=== Greco-Roman ===
Athlete	Event	Qualification	Round of 16	Quarterfinals	Semifinals	Repechage	Final / BM	
Athlete	Event	Opposition Result	Opposition Result	Opposition Result	Opposition Result	Opposition Result	Opposition Result	Rank
Roman Amoyan	Men's 59kg	Bye	Carvalho (POR); W 6–0	Maryanyan (RUS); L 0–9	—N/a	Fonnesbek (DEN); W 2–0	Mukhtarov (AZE); L 1–9	=5
Mihran Harutyunyan	Men's 66kg	Navarro (ESP); W 6–0	Stas (BUL); W 8–0	Maksimović (SRB); W 9–1	Has Aliyev (AZE); W 8–5	—N/a	Surkov (RUS); L 0–2	2nd place, silver medalist(s)
Karapet Chalyan	Men's 75kg	Madsen (DEN); L 0–8	did not advance					
Maksim Manukyan	Men's 85kg	Omarov (CZE); W 8–1	Tahmasebi (AZE); W 9–0	Kazakevič (LTU); W 5–5	Beleniuk (UKR); L 4–12	—N/a	Başar (TUR); L 0–3	=5
