= Gymnastics at the 2015 European Games – Women's rhythmic individual ball =

Women's rhythmic individual ball at the 2015 European Games
- Venue: National Gymnastics Arena
- Date: 21 June
- Competitors: 6 from 6 nations
- Winning score: 18.950

Medalists
| gold medal | Yana Kudryavtseva | Russia |
| silver medal | Ganna Rizatdinova | Ukraine |
| bronze medal | Melitina Staniouta | Belarus |

The women's rhythmic individual ball competition at the 2015 European Games was held at the National Gymnastics Arena on 21 June 2015. The six best results from the All-Around Final qualified in the Final, with one gymnast allowed per country.

== Results ==
| Rank | Gymnast | D Score | E Score | Pen. | Total |
|---|---|---|---|---|---|
| 1st place, gold medalist(s) | Yana Kudryavtseva (RUS) | 9.400 | 9.550 | | 18.950 |
| 2nd place, silver medalist(s) | Ganna Rizatdinova (UKR) | 9.100 | 9.150 | | 18.250 |
| 3rd place, bronze medalist(s) | Melitina Staniouta (BLR) | 9.000 | 9.200 | | 18.200 |
| 4 | Salome Pazhava (GEO) | 8.800 | 9.200 | | 18.000 |
| 5 | Neta Rivkin (ISR) | 8.900 | 9.050 | | 17.950 |
| 6 | Marina Durunda (AZE) | 8.400 | 8.300 | 0.60 | 16.100 |
