= Sambo at the 2019 European Games – Women's 64 kg =

Sambo event at the 2019 European Games in Minsk

Women's 64 kg at the 2019 European Games
- Venue: Minsk Sports Palace
- Date: 22 June
- Competitors: 8 from 8 nations

Medalists
gold medal	Ekaterina Onoprienko	Russia
silver medal	Olena Sayko	Ukraine
bronze medal	Anda Vâlvoi	Romania
bronze medal	Tatsiana Matsko	Belarus

The women's 64 kg sambo event at the 2019 European Games in Minsk was held on 22 June at the Minsk Sports Palace.

== Results ==
Legend

- VI – Total victory by injury
- VS – Total victory by decisive superiority
- VH – Total victory – painful hold

Quarterfinals
Jule Horn (GER)	0
Alice Perin (ITA)	7^{VH}
Olena Sayko (UKR)	1^{VH}
María Cabas (ESP)	0
Tatsiana Matsko (BLR)	0
Ekaterina Onoprienko (RUS)	8^{VS}
Anda Vâlvoi (ROU)	8^{VH}
Marianthi Skorda (GRE)	3

Semifinals
Alice Perin (ITA)	1
Olena Sayko (UKR)	5
Ekaterina Onoprienko (RUS)	9^{VS}
Anda Vâlvoi (ROU)	0

Final
Olena Sayko (UKR)	0
Ekaterina Onoprienko (RUS)	7

Repechage

Repechage
Jule Horn (GER)	0
María Cabas (ESP)	8^{VS}

Third place
María Cabas (ESP)	0
Anda Vâlvoi (ROU)	0^{VH}

Repechage
Tatsiana Matsko (BLR)	0^{VI}
Marianthi Skorda (GRE)	0

Third place
Tatsiana Matsko (BLR)	10^{VS}
Alice Perin (ITA)	0
