= Gymnastics at the 2015 European Games – Women's rhythmic individual ribbon =

Women's rhythmic individual ribbon at the 2015 European Games
- Venue: National Gymnastics Arena
- Date: 21 June
- Competitors: 6 from 6 nations
- Winning score: 19.000

Medalists
gold medal	Yana Kudryavtseva	Russia
silver medal	Marina Durunda	Azerbaijan
bronze medal	Salome Pazhava	Georgia

The women's rhythmic individual ribbon competition at the 2015 European Games was held at the National Gymnastics Arena on 21 June 2015. The six best results from the All-Around Final qualified in the Final, with one gymnast allowed per country.

== Results ==
Rank	Gymnast	D Score	E Score	Pen.	Total
1st place, gold medalist(s)	Yana Kudryavtseva (RUS)	9.500	9.500		19.000
2nd place, silver medalist(s)	Marina Durunda (AZE)	8.950	9.250		18.200
3rd place, bronze medalist(s)	Salome Pazhava (GEO)	8.950	9.000		17.950
4	Melitina Staniouta (BLR)	8.800	9.100		17.900
5	Ganna Rizatdinova (UKR)	8.700	8.900		17.600
6	Neta Rivkin (ISR)	8.500	8.900		17.400
