= Sambo at the 2015 European Games – Men's 90 kg =

Sambo competitions

Men's 90 kg at the 2015 European Games
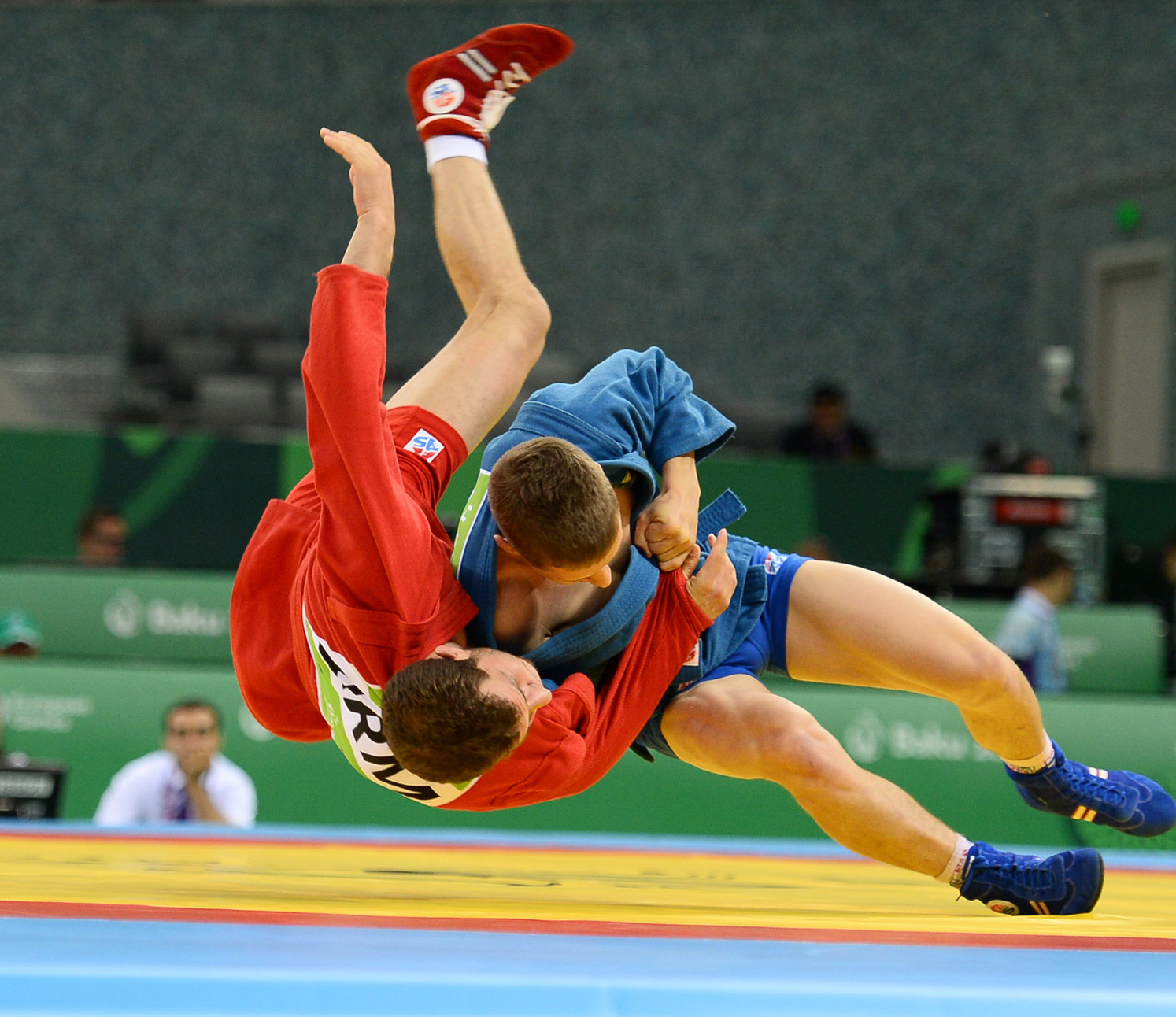
- The semi-final match between Ashot Danielyan (ARM) and Andrei Kazusionak (BLR).
- Venue: Heydar Aliyev Arena
- Date: 22 June
- Competitors: 8 from 8 nations

Medalists
gold medal	Alsim Chernoskulov	Russia
silver medal	Andrei Kazusionak	Belarus
bronze medal	Davit Karbelashvili	Georgia
bronze medal	Radvilas Matukas	Lithuania

Men's 90 kg competition at the 2015 European Games in Baku, Azerbaijan, took place on 22 June at the Heydar Aliyev Arena.

== Schedule ==
All times are Azerbaijan Summer Time (UTC+05:00)

Date	Time	Event
Monday, 22 June 2015	10:30	Quarterfinals
Monday, 22 June 2015	11:15	Semifinals
Monday, 22 June 2015	19:00	Repechage
Monday, 22 June 2015	19:30	Finals

== Results ==
Quarterfinals		Semifinals		Final
Davit Karbelashvili (GEO)	0
Alsim Chernoskulov (RUS)	2	Alsim Chernoskulov (RUS)	4
Ivan Vasylchuk (UKR)	0	Kanan Gasimov (AZE)	0
Kanan Gasimov (AZE)	2			Alsim Chernoskulov (RUS)	2
Valeri Meleaschevici (MDA)	2			Andrei Kazusionak (BLR)	0
Ashot Danielyan (ARM)	4	Ashot Danielyan (ARM)	1
Andrei Kazusionak (BLR)	2	Andrei Kazusionak (BLR)	3
Radvilas Matukas (LTU)	0

=== Repechage ===
Bronze medal match
Davit Karbelashvili (GEO)	3
Kanan Gasimov (AZE)	1
Radvilas Matukas (LTU)	2
Ashot Danielyan (ARM)	0
