= Olena Sayko =

Ukrainian sambo practitioner

- Born: Сайко Олена Володимирівна; April 14, 1987 (age 39)
- Nationality: Ukrainian
- Division: 64 kg
- Style: Sambo
- Last updated on: 11 January 2023

Olena Sayko (Ukrainian: Сайко Олена Володимирівна; born 14 April 1987) is a Ukrainian sambist. She is 2015 and 2019 European Games silver medalist in women's sambo. She is 2007 World champion, 2008 European champion and multiple medalist of World and European championships. Sayko also won silver medal at the 2013 Summer Universiade.
