= Wrestling at the 2015 European Games =

- Host city: Baku, Azerbaijan
- Dates: 13–18 June
- Stadium: Heydar Aliyev Sports Arena

The wrestling events at the 2015 European Games were held at the Heydar Aliyev Arena, Baku from 13 to 20 June 2015. 24 events were held, 16 in freestyle across both sexes, and 8 in the Greco-Roman style, for men only.

== Medal table ==
* Host nation (Azerbaijan)

Rank	Nation	Gold	Silver	Bronze	Total
1	Russia	11	2	5	18
2	Azerbaijan*	6	2	7	15
3	Turkey	2	1	7	10
4	Hungary	2	1	0	3
5	Ukraine	1	4	3	8
6	Belarus	1	2	5	8
7	Sweden	1	0	0	1
8	Poland	0	3	2	5
9	Georgia	0	2	3	5
10	Bulgaria	0	1	3	4
10	Germany	0	1	3	4
12	Moldova	0	1	2	3
13	Armenia	0	1	0	1
13	Israel	0	1	0	1
13	Italy	0	1	0	1
13	Serbia	0	1	0	1
17	France	0	0	2	2
18	Croatia	0	0	1	1
18	Estonia	0	0	1	1
18	Latvia	0	0	1	1
18	Norway	0	0	1	1
18	Slovakia	0	0	1	1
18	Spain	0	0	1	1
Totals (23 entries)		24	24	48	96

== Medalists ==
=== Men's freestyle ===
Event	Gold	Silver	Bronze
57 kg	Viktor Lebedev; Russia	Marcel Ewald; Germany	Alexandru Chirtoacă; Moldova
57 kg	Viktor Lebedev; Russia	Marcel Ewald; Germany	Sezar Akgül; Turkey
61 kg	Aleksandr Bogomoev; Russia	Beka Lomtadze; Georgia	Haji Aliyev; Azerbaijan
61 kg	Aleksandr Bogomoev; Russia	Beka Lomtadze; Georgia	Vasyl Shuptar; Ukraine
65 kg	Toghrul Asgarov; Azerbaijan	Frank Chamizo; Italy	Mustafa Kaya; Turkey
65 kg	Toghrul Asgarov; Azerbaijan	Frank Chamizo; Italy	Ilyas Bekbulatov; Russia
70 kg	Magomedrasul Gazimagomedov; Russia	Magomedmurad Gadżijew; Poland	Yakup Gör; Turkey
70 kg	Magomedrasul Gazimagomedov; Russia	Magomedmurad Gadżijew; Poland	Ruslan Dibirgadjiyev; Azerbaijan
74 kg	Aniuar Geduev; Russia	Soner Demirtaş; Turkey	Jabrayil Hasanov; Azerbaijan
74 kg	Aniuar Geduev; Russia	Soner Demirtaş; Turkey	Jumber Kvelashvili; Georgia
86 kg	Abdulrashid Sadulaev; Russia	Piotr Ianulov; Moldova	Radosław Marcinkiewicz; Poland
86 kg	Abdulrashid Sadulaev; Russia	Piotr Ianulov; Moldova	Sandro Aminashvili; Georgia
97 kg	Khetag Gazyumov; Azerbaijan	Elizbar Odikadze; Georgia	Valeriy Andriytsev; Ukraine
97 kg	Khetag Gazyumov; Azerbaijan	Elizbar Odikadze; Georgia	Abdusalam Gadisov; Russia
125 kg	Taha Akgül; Turkey	Aliaksei Shamarau; Belarus	Geno Petriashvili; Georgia
125 kg	Taha Akgül; Turkey	Aliaksei Shamarau; Belarus	Jamaladdin Magomedov; Azerbaijan

=== Men's Greco-Roman ===
Event	Gold	Silver	Bronze
59 kg	Stepan Maryanyan; Russia	Soslan Daurov; Belarus	Elman Mukhtarov; Azerbaijan
59 kg	Stepan Maryanyan; Russia	Soslan Daurov; Belarus	Tarik Belmadani; France
66 kg	Artem Surkov; Russia	Mihran Harutyunyan; Armenia	Hasan Aliyev; Azerbaijan
66 kg	Artem Surkov; Russia	Mihran Harutyunyan; Armenia	István Lévai; Slovakia
71 kg	Rasul Chunayev; Azerbaijan	Balint Korpasi; Hungary	Dominik Etlinger; Croatia
71 kg	Rasul Chunayev; Azerbaijan	Balint Korpasi; Hungary	Frank Stäbler; Germany
75 kg	Elvin Mursaliyev; Azerbaijan	Viktor Nemeš; Serbia	Chingiz Labazanov; Russia
75 kg	Elvin Mursaliyev; Azerbaijan	Viktor Nemeš; Serbia	Dmytro Pyshkov; Ukraine
80 kg	Evgeny Saleev; Russia	Rafig Huseynov; Azerbaijan	Daniel Aleksandrov; Bulgaria
80 kg	Evgeny Saleev; Russia	Rafig Huseynov; Azerbaijan	Viktar Sasunouski; Belarus
85 kg	Davit Chakvetadze; Russia	Zhan Beleniuk; Ukraine	Metehan Başar; Turkey
85 kg	Davit Chakvetadze; Russia	Zhan Beleniuk; Ukraine	Ramsin Azizsir; Germany
98 kg	Islam Magomedov; Russia	Dimitiry Timchenko; Ukraine	Melonin Noumonvi; France
98 kg	Islam Magomedov; Russia	Dimitiry Timchenko; Ukraine	Cenk İldem; Turkey
130 kg	Rıza Kayaalp; Turkey	Sabah Shariati; Azerbaijan	Heiki Nabi; Estonia
130 kg	Rıza Kayaalp; Turkey	Sabah Shariati; Azerbaijan	Ioseb Chugoshvili; Belarus

=== Women's freestyle ===
Event	Gold	Silver	Bronze
48 kg	Mariya Stadnyk; Azerbaijan	Elitsa Yankova; Bulgaria	Iwona Matkowska; Poland
48 kg	Mariya Stadnyk; Azerbaijan	Elitsa Yankova; Bulgaria	Valentina Islamova; Russia
53 kg	Anzhela Dorogan; Azerbaijan	Roksana Zasina; Poland	Merve Kenger; Turkey
53 kg	Anzhela Dorogan; Azerbaijan	Roksana Zasina; Poland	Nadzeya Shushko; Belarus
55 kg	Sofia Mattsson; Sweden	Katarzyna Krawczyk; Poland	Evelina Nikolova; Bulgaria
55 kg	Sofia Mattsson; Sweden	Katarzyna Krawczyk; Poland	Nataliya Synyshyn; Azerbaijan
58 kg	Emese Barka; Hungary	Tetyana Lavrenchuk; Ukraine	Elif Jale Yesilirmak; Turkey
58 kg	Emese Barka; Hungary	Tetyana Lavrenchuk; Ukraine	Grace Bullen; Norway
60 kg	Marianna Sastin; Hungary	Svetlana Lipatova; Russia	Veranika Ivanova; Belarus
60 kg	Marianna Sastin; Hungary	Svetlana Lipatova; Russia	Taybe Yusein; Bulgaria
63 kg	Valeria Lazinskaya; Russia	Yuliya Tkach; Ukraine	Anastasija Grigorjeva; Latvia
63 kg	Valeria Lazinskaya; Russia	Yuliya Tkach; Ukraine	Maryia Mamashuk; Belarus
69 kg	Alina Stadnik; Ukraine	Ilana Kratysh; Israel	Natalia Vorobieva; Russia
69 kg	Alina Stadnik; Ukraine	Ilana Kratysh; Israel	Aline Focken; Germany
75 kg	Vasilisa Marzaliuk; Belarus	Ekaterina Bukina; Russia	Maider Unda; Spain
75 kg	Vasilisa Marzaliuk; Belarus	Ekaterina Bukina; Russia	Svetlana Saenko; Moldova

== Participating nations ==
A total of 453 athletes from 39 nations competed in wrestling at the 2015 European Games:

- Albania (3)
- Armenia (10)
- Austria (12)
- Azerbaijan (24)
- Belarus (24)
- Bulgaria (24)
- Croatia (6)
- Czech Republic (9)
- Denmark (3)
- Estonia (7)
- Finland (11)
- France (12)
- Georgia (16)
- Germany (22)
- Great Britain (2)
- Greece (15)
- Hungary (21)
- Ireland (1)
- Israel (6)
- Italy (12)
- Kosovo (3)
- Latvia (10)
- Lithuania (10)
- Macedonia (5)
- Moldova (17)
- Netherlands (1)
- Norway (6)
- Poland (19)
- Portugal (5)
- Romania (18)
- Russia (24)
- Serbia (7)
- Slovakia (9)
- Slovenia (2)
- Spain (10)
- Sweden (12)
- Switzerland (7)
- Turkey (24)
- Ukraine (24)
