= Razmik Tonoyan =

Ukrainian sambist and judoka

- Born: Размік Тоноян Андранікович; September 28, 1988 (age 38); Zaporizhia
- Nationality: Ukrainian
- Style: Sambo
- Team: National Guard of Ukraine Sports Club

Razmik Andranikovich Tonoyan (Ukrainian: Размик Андранікович Тоноян; born 28 September 1988 in Zaporizhia, Soviet Union) is a Ukrainian sambist who competes in super heavyweight, both in classical and combat sambo. He is multiple medalist of different top-level sambo competitions. At the 2015 European Games he was bronze medalist. He is of Armenian descent.
