= Belarus at the 2015 European Games =

- IOC code: BLR
- NOC: Belarus Olympic Committee
- Website: www.noc.by

in Baku, Azerbaijan 12 – 28 June 2015
- Competitors: 151 in 24 sports
- Flag bearer: Mikhail Siamionau
- Medals Ranked 7th: Gold 10 Silver 11 Bronze 22 Total 43

European Games appearances (overview)
- 2015; 2019; 2023; 2027

Belarus competed at the 2015 European Games, in Baku, Azerbaijan from 12 to 28 June 2015.

== Medalists ==
Medal	Name	Sport	Event	Date
Gold	Vasilisa Marzaliuk	Wrestling	Women's freestyle 75 kg	16 June
Gold	Andrei Bahdanovich; Aliaksandr Bahdanovich	Canoe sprint	Men's C2-1000m	15 June
Gold	Maryna Litvinchuk	Canoe sprint	Women's K1-5000m	16 June
Gold	Marharyta Makhneva; Maryna Litvinchuk	Canoe sprint	Women's K2-200m	16 June
Gold	Vitali Bubnovich	Shooting	Men's 10 metre air rifle	16 June
Gold	Vasil Kiryienka	Cycling	Men's individual time trial	18 June
Gold	Alena Amialiusik	Cycling	Women's road race	20 June
Gold	Ksenya Cheldishkina; Maria Kadobina; Valeriya Pischelina; Arina Tsitsilina; Hanna Dudzenkova	Gymnastics	Women's rhythmic group Clubs and hoops	21 June
Gold	Stsiapan Papou	Sambo	Men's 74kg	22 June
Gold	Tatsiana Matsko	Sambo	Women's 64kg	22 June
Silver	Soslan Daurov	Wrestling	Men's Greco-Roman 59 kg	13 June
Silver	Aleksei Shemarov	Wrestling	Men's freestyle 125 kg	18 June
Silver	Hanna Marusava; Ekaterina Timofeyeva; Alena Tolkach	Archery	Women's team	18 June
Silver	Vladimir Samsonov	Table tennis	Men's singles	19 June
Silver	Melitina Staniouta	Gymnastics	Women's rhythmic individual hoop	21 June
Silver	Uladzislau Hancharou	Gymnastics	Men's trampoline individual	21 June
Silver	Uladzislau Hancharou; Mikalai Kazak	Gymnastics	Men's trampoline synchronized	21 June
Silver	Andrei Kazusionak	Sambo	Men's 90kg	22 June
Silver	Volha Namazava	Sambo	Women's −68kg	22 June
Silver	Mikita Tsymyh	Swimming	Men's 200 m backstroke	24 June
Silver	Dzmitry Asanau	Boxing	Men's 56kg	25 June
Bronze	Viktar Sasunouski	Wrestling	Men's Greco-Roman 80 kg	13 June
Bronze	Ksenya Cheldishkina; Maria Kadobina; Aliaksandra Narkevich; Valeriya Pischelina; Arina Tsitsilina; Hanna Dudzenkova	Gymnastics	Women's group all-around	17 June
Bronze	Katsiaryna Barysevich; Veranika Nabokina; Karina Sandovich	Gymnastics	Women's acrobatics groups all-around	19 June
Bronze	Katsiaryna Barysevich; Veranika Nabokina; Karina Sandovich	Gymnastics	Women's acrobatics groups balance	21 June
Bronze	Katsiaryna Barysevich; Veranika Nabokina; Karina Sandovich	Gymnastics	Women's acrobatics groups dynamic	21 June
Bronze	Melitina Staniouta	Gymnastics	Women's rhythmic individual all-around	19 June
Bronze	Melitina Staniouta	Gymnastics	Women's rhythmic individual ball	21 June
Bronze	Melitina Staniouta	Gymnastics	Women's rhythmic individual clubs	21 June
Bronze	Hanna Harchonak	Gymnastics	Women's trampoline individual	21 June
Bronze	Yury Rybak	Sambo	Men's +100kg	22 June
Bronze	Katsiaryna Prakapenka	Sambo	Women's 60kg	22 June
Bronze	Vitaliy Bialko; Raman Piatrushenka	Canoe sprint	Men's K2-1000m	16 June
Bronze	Pavel Miadzvedzeu; Vitaliy Bialko; Aleh Yurenia; Raman Piatrushenka	Canoe sprint	Men's K4-1000m	16 June
Bronze	Sergei Martynov	Shooting	Men's 50 metre rifle prone	18 June
Bronze	Viktoria Chaika	Shooting	Women's 10 metre air pistol	17 June
Bronze	Vitali Bubnovich	Shooting	Men's 50 metre rifle three positions	19 June
Bronze	Ioseb Chugoshvili	Wrestling	Men's Greco-Roman 130 kg	14 June
Bronze	Nadzeya Shushko	Wrestling	Women's freestyle 53 kg	15 June
Bronze	Veranika Ivanova	Wrestling	Women's freestyle 60 kg	15 June
Bronze	Maryia Mamashuk	Wrestling	Women's freestyle 63 kg	15 June
Bronze	Anton Prilepov	Archery	Men's individual	22 June

== Archery ==
Belarus has qualified for three quota places in both the men's and the women's archery events at the Games, and as a result has also qualified for the team events.

Athlete	Event	Ranking round		Round of 64	Round of 32	Round of 16	Quarterfinals	Semifinals	Final / BM	
Athlete	Event	Score	Seed	Opposition Score	Opposition Score	Opposition Score	Opposition Score	Opposition Score	Opposition Score	Rank
Anton Prilepov	Men's individual	673	7	Sigurðsson (ISL); W 7–3	Nesteng (NOR); W 6–0	Pkhakadze (GEO); W 6–4	van der Ven (NED); W 6–4	van den Berg (NED); L 0–6	Naploszek (POL); W 7–3	3rd place, bronze medalist(s)
Pavel Dalidovich	Men's individual	671	9	Habjan Malavašič (SLO); L 0–6	Did not advance					33
Aliaksandr Liahusheu	Men's individual	660	23	Szafran (POL); L 4–6	Did not advance					33
Hanna Marusava	Women's individual	635	22	Thomas (FRA); W 7–3	Richter (GER); L 2–6	Did not advance				17
Ekaterina Timofeyeva	Women's individual	635	23	Lesniak (POL); W 6–2	Sichenikova (UKR); L 2–6	Did not advance				17
Alena Tolkach	Women's individual	617	45	Umer (SLO); W 6–5	Anagoz (TUR); L 2–6	Did not advance				17
Anton Prilepov; Pavel Dalidovich; Aliaksandr Liahusheu	Men's team	2004	2	—		Bye	Spain (ESP); L 0–6	Did not advance		5
Hanna Marusava; Ekaterina Timofeyeva; Alena Tolkach	Women's team	1887	9	—		Spain (ESP); W 5–3	Germany (GER); W 6–2	Ukraine (UKR); W 5–3	Italy (ITA); L 3–5	2nd place, silver medalist(s)
Hanna Marusava; Anton Prilepov	Mixed team	1308	10	—		Turkey (TUR); W 6–0	Slovenia (SLO); L 2–6	Did not advance		5

== Athletics ==
- Men: Dmitri Barkalov, Andrey Likhovitski, Vasily Mikhalitsin
- Women: Svetlana Lifenko, Valeriya Tsekhmistrenko, Natalia Yakubova

== Badminton ==
Men

Athlete	Event	Group stage				Round of 16	Quarterfinal	Semifinal	Final / BM	
Athlete	Event	Opposition Score	Opposition Score	Opposition Score	Rank	Opposition Score	Opposition Score	Opposition Score	Opposition Score	Rank
Vladzislav Kushnir	Singles	Rogalski (POL); L (8–21, 9–21)	Krauklis (LAT); W (21–19, 21–19)	Wraber (AUT); L (12–21, 9–21)	3	Did not advance				

Women

Athlete	Event	Group stage				Round of 16	Quarterfinal	Semifinal	Final / BM	
Athlete	Event	Opposition Score	Opposition Score	Opposition Score	Rank	Opposition Score	Opposition Score	Opposition Score	Opposition Score	Rank
Alesia Zaitsava	Singles	Olariu (ROM); W (21–0, 21–0) RET	Stapušaitytė (LTU); W (21–17, 21–9)	Perminova (RUS); L (19–21, 17–21)	2 Q	Nedelcheva (BUL); L (13–21, 21–13, 12–21)	Did not advance			
Anastasiya Cherniavskaya; Alesia Zaitsava	Doubles	Grebak / Helsbøl (DEN); L (12–21, 14–21)	Kuuba / Rüütel (EST); L (15–21, 15–21)	Bott / Karnott (GER); L (7–21, 10–21)	4	Did not advance				

== Beach volleyball ==
- Men: Alexander Dedkov, Alexander Kovalenko
- Women: Viktoriya Shalayevskaya, Viktoriya Sekretova, Valeriya Babenko, Viktoriya Milevskaya

== Boxing ==
- Men: Ivan Figurenko, Dmitri Asanov, Vazgen Safaryantz, Evgeni Dolgolevets, Magomet Nurudinov, Vitali Bondarenko, Sergei Novikov, Leonid Chernobayev, Yan Sudilovski
- Women: Yana Burim, Viktoriya Kebikova

== Canoeing ==
- Men: Roman Petrushenko, Vitali Bel'ko, Oleg Yurenya, Pavel Medvedev, Vadim Makhnev, Taras Val'ko, Alexander Bogdanovich, Andrey Bogdanovich, Maksim Petrov, Kozyr Artyom,
- Women: Marina Litvinchuk, Margarita Makhneva, Nadezhda Lepeshko

== Cycling ==
- Men: Vasily Kirienko, Konstantin Sivtsov, Evgeni Gutarovich
- Women:Tatyana Sharakova, Yelena Omelyusik, Olga Antonova, Ksenia Tugai, Yelena Sitko

== Diving ==
- Men: Artyom Borovski, Yuri Novrozov
- Women: Kristina Sheshko, Yulia Bandik, Yekaterina Veligurskaya

== Fencing ==
- Men: Alexander Buikevich, Sergey Byk
- Women: Darya Andreeva

== Gymnastics ==
=== Artistic ===
- Women's – 3 quota places

=== Rhythmic ===
Belarus has qualified one athlete after the performance at the 2013 Rhythmic Gymnastics European Championships.

- Individual – 1 quota place

=== Trampoline ===
Belarus qualified two athletes based on the results at the 2014 European Trampoline Championships. The gymnasts will compete in both the individual and the synchronized event.

- Men's – 2 quota place
- Women's – 2 quota places

== Triathlon ==
- Men's – Aliaksandr Vasilevich
