= Sambo at the 2015 European Games =

Sambo competitions

- Venue: Heydar Aliyev Arena, Baku
- Date: 22 June
- Competitors: 72 (38 men, 34 women) from 21 nations

Sambo competitions at the 2015 European Games in Baku were held on 22 June 2015 at the Heydar Aliyev Arena, consisting of eight events, four in each gender.

== Qualification ==
Qualification places for Sambo was determined based on qualification event rankings, host NOC allocation and universality by European Sambo Federation.

== Medal summary ==
=== Men's events ===
Event	Gold	Silver	Bronze
57 kg	Aymergen Atkunov; Russia	Islam Gasumov; Azerbaijan	Uladzislau Burdz; Belarus
57 kg	Aymergen Atkunov; Russia	Islam Gasumov; Azerbaijan	Vakhtangi Chidrashvili; Georgia
74 kg	Stsiapan Papou; Belarus	Amil Gasimov; Azerbaijan	Kakha Mamulashvili; Georgia
74 kg	Stsiapan Papou; Belarus	Amil Gasimov; Azerbaijan	Azamat Sidakov; Russia
90 kg	Alsim Chernoskulov; Russia	Andrei Kazusionak; Belarus	Davit Karbelashvili; Georgia
90 kg	Alsim Chernoskulov; Russia	Andrei Kazusionak; Belarus	Radvilas Matukas; Lithuania
+100 kg	Artem Osipenko; Russia	Vasif Safarbayov; Azerbaijan	Yury Rybak; Belarus
+100 kg	Artem Osipenko; Russia	Vasif Safarbayov; Azerbaijan	Razmik Tonoyan; Ukraine

=== Women's events ===
Event	Gold	Silver	Bronze
52 kg	Anna Kharitonova; Russia	Nazakat Khalilova; Azerbaijan	Magdalena Varbanova; Bulgaria
52 kg	Anna Kharitonova; Russia	Nazakat Khalilova; Azerbaijan	Rūta Aksionova; Lithuania
60 kg	Yana Kostenko; Russia	Kalina Stefanova; Bulgaria	Katsiaryna Prakapenka; Belarus
60 kg	Yana Kostenko; Russia	Kalina Stefanova; Bulgaria	Daniela Hondiu; Romania
64 kg	Tatsiana Matsko; Belarus	Olena Sayko; Ukraine	Anna Shcherbakova; Russia
64 kg	Tatsiana Matsko; Belarus	Olena Sayko; Ukraine	Sarah Loko; France
-68 kg	Ivana Jandrić; Serbia	Volha Namazava; Belarus	Céline Condé; France
-68 kg	Ivana Jandrić; Serbia	Volha Namazava; Belarus	Olga Zakhartsova; Russia

== Medal table ==
* Host nation (Azerbaijan)

Rank	Nation	Gold	Silver	Bronze	Total
1	Russia	5	0	3	8
2	Belarus	2	2	3	7
3	Serbia	1	0	0	1
4	Azerbaijan*	0	4	0	4
5	Bulgaria	0	1	1	2
5	Ukraine	0	1	1	2
7	Georgia	0	0	3	3
8	France	0	0	2	2
8	Lithuania	0	0	2	2
10	Romania	0	0	1	1
Totals (10 entries)		8	8	16	32

== Participating countries ==
The number beside each nation represents the number of athletes who will compete for each country at the 2015 European Games.

- Armenia (3)
- Austria (1)
- Azerbaijan (8)
- Belarus (8)
- Bulgaria (6)
- France (4)
- Georgia (6)
- Greece (1)
- Israel (1)
- Latvia (1)
- Lithuania (2)
- Macedonia (1)
- Moldova (4)
- Poland (1)
- Romania (6)
- Russia (8)
- Serbia (1)
- Slovenia (1)
- Spain (2)
- Turkey (1)
- Ukraine (6)
