= Lithuania at the 2015 European Games =

- IOC code: LTU
- NOC: Lithuanian National Olympic Committee
- Website: www.ltok.lt

in Baku, Azerbaijan 12 – 28 June
- Competitors: 70 in 16 sports
- Flag bearer: Rokas Guščinas
- Medals Ranked 24th: Gold 2 Silver 1 Bronze 4 Total 7

European Games appearances (overview)
- 2015; 2019; 2023; 2027

Lithuania competed at the 2015 European Games, in Baku, Azerbaijan from 12 to 28 June 2015.

== Medalists ==
| Medal | Name | Sport | Event | Date |
|---|---|---|---|---|
| Gold | Henrikas Žustautas | Canoe sprint | Men's C1-200m | 16 June |
| Gold | Andrius Šidlauskas | Swimming | Men's 50 metre breaststroke | 25 June |
| Silver | Andrius Šidlauskas | Swimming | Men's 100 metre breaststroke | 27 June |
| Bronze | Ieva Dumbauskaitė; Monika Povilaitytė | Beach volleyball | Women's tournament | 20 June |
| Bronze | Rūta Aksionova | Sambo | Women's 52 kg | 22 June |
| Bronze | Radvilas Matukas | Sambo | Men's 90 kg | 22 June |
| Bronze | Kestutis Navickas | Badminton | Men's singles | 27 June |

== Archery ==
| Athlete | Event | Ranking round | | Round of 64 | Round of 32 | Round of 16 | Quarterfinals | Semifinals | Final / BM | |
| Athlete | Event | Score | Seed | Opposition Score | Opposition Score | Opposition Score | Opposition Score | Opposition Score | Opposition Score | Rank |
|---|---|---|---|---|---|---|---|---|---|---|
| Dangerūta Nosalienė | Women's individual | 593 | 59 | Sartori (Italy); L 3–7 | Did not advance | | | | | 33 |

== Badminton ==
- Men's Singles: Kęstutis Navickas
- Women's Singles: Akvilė Stapušaitytė
- Men's Doubles: Alan Plavin, Povilas Bartušis
- Mixed Doubles: Vytautė Fomkinaitė, Povilas Bartušis

== Basketball ==
- Men's 3x3 Team: Ovidijus Varanauskas, Darius Tarvydas, Vitalijus Lukša, Giedrius Marčiukaitis
- Women's 3x3 Team: Kristina Alminaitė, Erika Liutkutė, Eglė Tarasevičiūtė, Kornelija Balčiūnaitė

== Boxing ==
6 boxers will represent Lithuania.

- Men's 60 kg – Edgaras Skurdelis
- Men's 64 kg – Evaldas Petrauskas^{1}
- Men's 69 kg – Eimantas Stanionis^{1}
- Men's 75 kg – Tomas Pivarūnas
- Men's 91 kg – Tadas Tamašauskas
- Men's over 91 kg – Mantas Valavičius

^{1} – Evaldas Petrauskas and Eimantas Stanionis withdrew from participating in the European Games on the opening day due APB league schedule change.

== Canoeing ==
Lithuania will be represented by 7 athletes.

Henrikas Žustautas, Aurimas Lankas, Edvinas Ramanauskas, Ignas Navakauskas, Andrej Olijnik, Ričardas Nekriošius, Anelė Šakalytė

== Cycling ==
=== BMX ===
- Men's individual: Arminas Kazlauskis
- Women's individual: Vilma Rimšaitė

=== Road ===
- Men's individual – Ignatas Konovalovas, Evaldas Šiškevičius, Žydrūnas Savickas
- Women's individual – Daiva Tušlaitė, Aušrinė Trebaitė

== Diving ==
- Indrė Marija Girdauskaitė
- Daniela Aleksandravičiūtė
- Martynas Pabalys

== Gymnastics ==
=== Artistic ===
Lithuania has qualified one female and one male athletes after the performance at the 2014 European Artistic Gymnastics Championship.

- Men's individual – Rokas Guščinas
- Women's individual – Vaida Zitinevičiūtė

== Judo ==
4 judokas will represent Lithuania: Karolis Bauža, Marius Paškevičius, Sandra Jablonskytė, Santa Pakenytė

== Sambo ==
- Men's −90 kg – Radvilas Matukas
- Women's −52 kg – Rūta Aksionova

== Shooting ==
- Men's Rifle – Karolis Girulis
- Men's Skeet – Ronaldas Račinskas

== Swimming ==
- Andrius Šidlauskas
- Paulius Grigaliūnas
- Edvinas Mažintas
- Diana Jaruševičiūtė
- Agnė Šeleikaitė
- Bena Sarapaitė
- Meda Kulbačiauskaitė
- Greta Gataveckaitė
- Greta Pleikytė

== Table tennis ==
- Women's singles – Rūta Paškauskienė

== Triathlon ==
- Men's individual – Tautvydas Kopūstas

== Volleyball ==
Beach

- Men's Team – Lukas Každailis/Arnas Rumševičius
- Women's Team – Ieva Dumbauskaitė/Monika Povilaitytė

== Wrestling ==
Lithuania qualified 11 wrestlers to 2015 European Games.

Edgaras Venckaitis, Valdemaras Venckaitis, Julius Matuzevičius, Aleksandr Kazakevič, Mantas Knystautas, Vilius Laurinaitis, Jonas Rudavičius, Šarūnas Jurčys, Mindaugas Rumbutis, Giedrė Blekaitytė, Danutė Domikaitytė
