= France at the 2015 European Games =

- IOC code: FRA
- NOC: French National Olympic and Sports Committee
- Website: www.franceolympique.com

in Baku, Azerbaijan 12 – 28 June 2015
- Competitors: 250
- Flag bearer: Céline Goberville
- Medals Ranked 5th: Gold 12 Silver 13 Bronze 18 Total 43

European Games appearances (overview)
- 2015; 2019; 2023; 2027

France participated at the 2015 European Games, in Baku, Azerbaijan from 12 to 28 June 2015.

== Medalists ==
Medal	Name	Sport	Event	Date
Gold	Emily Thouy	Karate	Women's 55 kg	13 June
Gold	Lucie Ignace	Karate	Women's 61 kg	13 June
Gold	Gwladys Épangue	Taekwondo	Women's + 67 kg	19 June
Gold	Valérian Sauveplane	Shooting	Men's 50m Rifle 3 Positions	21 June
Gold	Nicolas D'Oriano	Swimming	Men's 1500m freestyle	24 June
Gold	Ivan Trevejo	Fencing	Men's Individual Epee	24 June
Gold	Nicolas D'Oriano	Swimming	Men's 800m freestyle	26 June
Gold	Ivan Trevejo; Yannick Borel; Ronan Gustin; Daniel Jerent	Fencing	Men's Team Epee	27 June
Gold	Emilie Andeol	Judo	Women's +78 kg	27 June
Gold	Joris Daudet	Cycling	Men's BMX	28 June
Gold	Pierre Duprat; Alexandre Iddir; Loic Korval; David Larose; Cyrille Maret; Loic Pietri; Florent Urani	Judo	Men's Team	28 June
Gold	Clarisse Agbegnenou; Emilie Andeol; Laetitia Blot; Gevrise Emane; Annabelle Euranie; Marie Eve Gahie; Madeleine Malonga; Automne Pavia	Judo	Women's Team	28 June
Silver	Steven Da Costa	Karate	Men's 67 kg	13 June
Silver	Sandy Scordo	Karate	Women's kata	14 June
Silver	Adrien Mattenet; Simon Gauzy; Emmanuel Lebesson	Table tennis	Men's team	15 June
Silver	Laurence Brize	Karate	Women's 50 metre rifle three positions	19 June
Silver	Marine Jurbert; Joëlle Vallez	Gymnastics	Women's trampoline synchronized	21 June
Silver	Loïc Korval	Judo	Men's 66 kg	25 June
Silver	Annabelle Euranie	Judo	Women's 52 kg	25 June
Silver	Pauline Mahieu	Swimming	Women's 50 m backstroke	26 June
Silver	Gaëlle Gebet; Julie Huin; Chloé Jubenot; Jéromine Mpah Njanga	Fencing	Women's team foil	26 June
Silver	Sofiane Oumiha	Boxing	Men's 60 kg	27 June
Silver	Estelle Mossely	Boxing	Women's 60 kg	27 June
Silver	Audrey Fontaine; Gaetan Mittelheisser	Badminton	Mixed doubles	28 June
Silver	Magalie Pottier	Cycling	Women's BMX	28 June
Bronze	Alexandra Recchia	Karate	Women's 50 kg	13 June
Bronze	Tarik Belmadani	Wrestling	Men's Greco-Roman 59 kg	13 June
Bronze	Melonin Noumonvi	Wrestling	Men's Greco-Roman 98 kg	13 June
Bronze	Cyrille Carre	Canoe sprint	Men's K1 5000m	16 June
Bronze	Alexis Jandard	Diving	Men's 10 metre platform	21 June
Bronze	Sarah Loko	Sambo	Women's 64 kg	22 June
Bronze	Celine Conde	Sambo	Women's −68 kg	22 June
Bronze	Anthony Terras; Lucie Anastassiou	Shooting	Mixed Skeet	22 June
Bronze	Nolwenn Herve	Swimming	Women's 50 m breaststroke	23 June
Bronze	Daniel Jerent	Fencing	Men's épée	24 June
Bronze	Pauline Mahieu	Swimming	Women's 100 m backstroke	24 June
Bronze	Matthias Marsau	Swimming	Men's 200 m butterfly	25 June
Bronze	Jean-Paul Tony-Hélissey	Fencing	Men's foil	25 June
Bronze	Margaux Rifkiss	Fencing	Women's sabre	25 June
Bronze	Tony Yoka	Boxing	Men's +91 kg	26 June
Bronze	Loïc Pietri	Judo	Men's 81 kg	26 June
Bronze	Clarisse Agbegnenou	Judo	Women's 63 kg	26 June
Bronze	Cyrille Maret	Judo	Men's 100 kg	27 June

== Archery ==
France has qualified for three quota places in both the men's and the women's archery events at the Games, and as a result has also qualified for the team events.

Athlete	Event	Ranking round		Round of 64	Round of 32	Round of 16	Quarterfinals	Semifinals	Final / BM	
Athlete	Event	Score	Seed	Opposition Score	Opposition Score	Opposition Score	Opposition Score	Opposition Score	Opposition Score	Rank
Pierre Plihon	Men's individual	673	6	Furnes (Norway); W 6–2	Weiss (Germany); W 6–4	Slater (United Kingdom); W 6–5	van den Berg (Netherlands); L 3–7	Did not advance		5
Lucas Daniel	Men's individual	672	8	Vengerov (Azerbaijan); W 6–0	Tsynguev (Russia); W 7–3	Habjan Malavašič (Slovenia); W 6–0	Naploszek (Poland); L 0–6	Did not advance		5
Jean-Charles Valladont	Men's individual	658	25	Tsynguev (Russia); L 4–6	Did not advance					33
Laura Ruggieri	Women's individual	640	14	der Kinderen (Netherlands); W 6–4	Marin (Spain); L 5–6	Did not advance				17
Berengere Schuh	Women's individual	640	15	Mayrhofer-Gritsch (Austria); W 6–0	Deden (Netherlands); W 6–4	Jager (Denmark); L 4–6	Did not advance			9
Solenne Thomas	Women's individual	618	43	Marusava (Belarus); L 3–7	Did not advance					33
Pierre Plihon; Lucas Daniel; Jean-Charles Valladont	Men's team	2003	3	—N/a		Bye	Germany W 5–3	Spain L 4–5	Netherlands L 3–5	4
Laura Ruggieri; Berengere Schuh; Solenne Thomas	Women's team	1898	7	—N/a		Turkey W 6–2	Russia L 3–5	Did not advance		5
Laura Ruggieri; Pierre Plihon	Mixed team	1313	6	—N/a		Spain L 3–5	Did not advance			9

== Gymnastics ==
=== Aerobic ===
France has a total of six athletes after the performance at the 2013 Aerobic Gymnastics European Championships. One gymnast from pairs must compete in the group making the total athletes to 6.

- Pairs – 1 pair of 2 athletes
- Groups – 1 team of 5 athletes

=== Artistic ===
- Women's – 3 quota places

=== Rhythmic ===
France has qualified one athlete after the performance at the 2013 Rhythmic Gymnastics European Championships.

- Individual – 1 quota place

=== Trampoline ===
France qualified two athletes based on the results at the 2014 European Trampoline Championships. The gymnasts will compete in both the individual and the synchronized event.

- Men's – 2 quota place
- Women's – 2 quota places

== Judo ==
Men

- 60 kg – Vincent Limare
- 66 kg – Loïc Korval, David Larose
- 73 kg – Pierre Duprat, Florent Urani
- 81 kg – Loïc Pietri
- 90 kg – Alexandre Iddir
- 100 kg – Cyrille Maret
- +100 kg – Teddy Riner

Women

- 52 kg – Annabelle Euranie
- 57 kg – Laëtitia Blot, Automne Pavia
- 63 kg – Clarisse Agbegnenou
- 70 kg – Gévrise Émane, Marie-Ève Gahié
- 78 kg – Madeleine Malonga, Audrey Tcheuméo
- +78 kg – Émilie Andéol

== Triathlon ==
- Men's – Leo Bergere, Lucas Jacolin
- Women's – Leonie Periault, Margot Garabedian
