= Georgia at the 2015 European Games =

- Flag of Georgia
- IOC code: GEO
- NOC: Georgian National Olympic Committee
- Website: www.geonoc.org.ge

in Baku, Azerbaijan 12 – 28 June 2015
- Competitors: 104
- Flag bearer: Zurab Datunashvili
- Medals Ranked 21st: Gold 2 Silver 6 Bronze 8 Total 16

European Games appearances (overview)
- 2015; 2019; 2023; 2027

Georgia competed at the 2015 European Games, in Baku, Azerbaijan from 12 to 28 June 2015.

== Medalists ==
| Medal | Name | Sport | Event | Date |
|---|---|---|---|---|
| Gold | Avtandil Tchrikishvili | Judo | Men's 81 kg | 26 June |
| Gold | Adam Okruashvili | Judo | Men's +100 kg | 27 June |
| Silver | Elizbar Odikadze | Wrestling | Men's freestyle 97 kg | 17 June |
| Silver | Khatuna Narimanidze; Lasha Pkhakadze | Archery | Mixed team | 17 June |
| Silver | Beka Lomtadze | Wrestling | Men's freestyle 61 kg | 18 June |
| Silver | Nugzar Tatalashvili | Judo | Men's 73 kg | 26 June |
| Silver | Varlam Liparteliani | Judo | Men's 90 kg | 27 June |
| Silver | Beka Gviniashvili; Varlam Liparteliani; Ushangi Margiani; Levani Matiashvili; Adam Okruashvili; Amiran Papinashvili; Lasha Shavdatuashvili; Nugzar Tatalashvili; Avtandil Tchrikishvili | Judo | Men's team | 28 June |
| Bronze | Jumber Kvelashvili | Wrestling | Men's freestyle 74 kg | 17 June |
| Bronze | Sandro Aminashvili | Wrestling | Men's freestyle 86 kg | 18 June |
| Bronze | Geno Petriashvili | Wrestling | Men's freestyle 125 kg | 18 June |
| Bronze | Salome Pazhava | Gymnastics | Women's individual ribbon | 21 June |
| Bronze | Vakhtangi Chidrashvili | Sambo | Men's 57 kg | 22 June |
| Bronze | Kakha Mamulashvili | Sambo | Men's 74 kg | 22 June |
| Bronze | Davit Karbelashvili | Sambo | Men's 90 kg | 22 June |
| Bronze | Amiran Papinashvili | Judo | Men's 60 kg | 25 June |

== Archery ==
Georgia has qualified for three quota places in both the women's archery events at the Games and one individual place in the men's, and as a result has also qualified for the women's and mixed team events.

| Athlete | Event | Ranking round | | Round of 64 | Round of 32 | Round of 16 | Quarterfinals | Semifinals | Final / BM | |
| Athlete | Event | Score | Seed | Opposition Score | Opposition Score | Opposition Score | Opposition Score | Opposition Score | Opposition Score | Rank |
|---|---|---|---|---|---|---|---|---|---|---|
| Lasha Pkhakadze | Men's individual | 669 | 10 | Balaz (Slovakia); W 6–0 | Szafran (Poland); W 6–2 | Prilepov (Belarus); L 4–6 | Did not advance | | | 9 |
| Khatuna Narimanidze | Women's individual | 653 | 4 | Ramazanova (Azerbaijan); W 6–4 | Martín (Spain); W 6–5 | Anagoz (Turkey); L 4–6 | Did not advance | | | 9 |
| Kristine Esebua | Women's individual | 634 | 24 | Unsal (Turkey); L 2–6 | Did not advance | | | | | 33 |
| Yuliya Lobzhenidze | Women's individual | 629 | 30 | Rosenvinge (Denmark); W 6–5 | Valeeva (Italy); W 6–2 | Marin (Spain); L 2–6 | Did not advance | | | 9 |
| Khatuna Narimanidze; Kristine Esebua; Yuliya Lobzhenidze | Women's team | 1916 | 5 | — | | Great Britain (United Kingdom); W 5–3 | Ukraine L 4–5 | Did not advance | | 5 |
| Khatuna Narimanidze; Lasha Pkhakadze | Mixed team | 1322 | 3 | — | | Romania W 5–3 | Spain W 5–4 | Slovenia W 5–1 | Italy L 3–5 | 2nd place, silver medalist(s) |

== Gymnastics ==
=== Artistic ===
- Women's individual – 1 quota place

=== Rhythmic ===
Georgia has qualified one athlete after the performance at the 2013 Rhythmic Gymnastics European Championships.

- Individual – 1 quota place

=== Trampoline ===
Georgia qualified two athletes based on the results at the 2014 European Trampoline Championships.

- Men's individual – 1 quota place
