= Ukraine at the 2015 European Games =

- IOC code: UKR
- NOC: National Olympic Committee of Ukraine
- Website: www.noc-ukr.org

in Baku, Azerbaijan 12 – 28 June 2015
- Competitors: 246 in 19 sports
- Medals Ranked 8th: Gold 8 Silver 14 Bronze 24 Total 46

European Games appearances (overview)
- 2015; 2019; 2023; 2027

Ukraine competed at the 2015 European Games, in Baku, Azerbaijan from 12 to 28 June 2015.

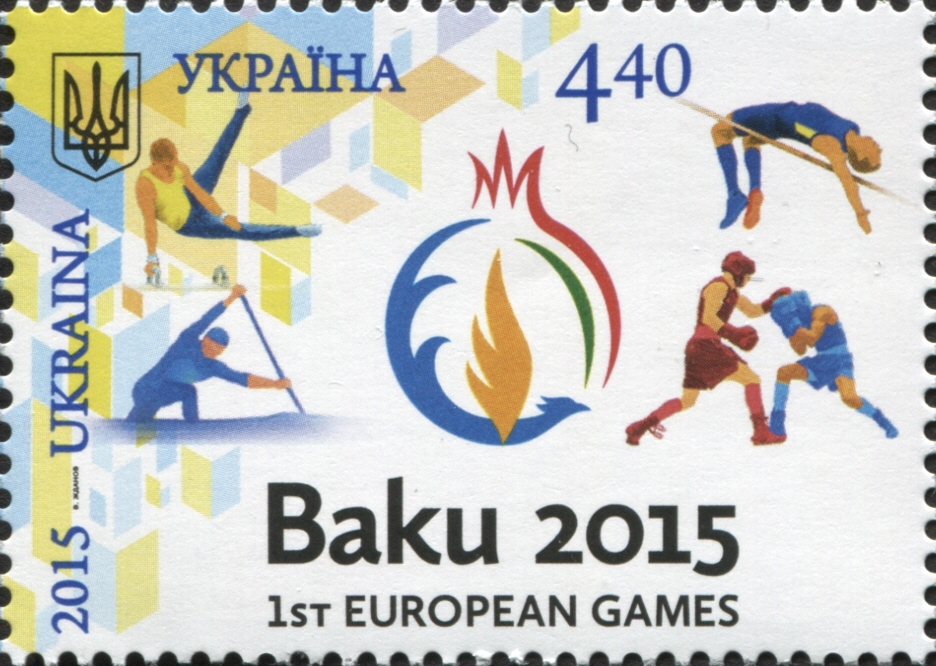
Ukrainian stamp (2015)

== Medalists ==
Medal	Name	Sport	Event
Gold	Heorhiy Ivanytskyy; Markiyan Ivashko; Viktor Ruban	Archery	Men's team
Gold	Olha Kharlan; Alina Komashchuk; Olena Kravatska; Olha Zhovnir	Fencing	Women's team sabre
Gold	Andriy Yagodka	Fencing	Men's sabre
Gold	Oleh Vernyayev	Gymnastics	Men's artistic individual all-around
Gold	Oleh Vernyayev	Gymnastics	Men's vault
Gold	Alina Stadnik	Wrestling	Women's freestyle 69 kg
Gold	Andriy Khloptsov	Swimming	Men's 50 metre butterfly
Gold	Inna Cherniak	Judo	Women's visually impaired 57 kg
Silver	Viktoriia Paziuk; Krystyna Matsko; Olga Maznichenko; Ganna Zarytska	Basketball	Women's tournament
Silver	Gevorg Manukian	Boxing	Men's 91 kg
Silver	Andriy Hryvko	Cycling	Men's road race
Silver	Hanna Solovey	Cycling	Women's individual time trial
Silver	Igor Radivilov; Oleh Vernyayev; Mykyta Yermak	Gymnastics	Men's artistic team all-around
Silver	Ganna Rizatdinova	Gymnastics	Women's rhythmic individual clubs
Silver	Ganna Rizatdinova	Gymnastics	Women's rhythmic individual ball
Silver	Olena Dmytrash; Yevgeniya Gomon; Oleksandra Gridasova; Valeriia Gudym; Anastasiya Voznyak	Gymnastics	Women's rhythmic group ribbons
Silver	Oleksandr Pominov	Judo	Men's Visually impaired +90 kg
Silver	Olena Sayko	Sambo	Women's 64 kg
Silver	Zhan Beleniuk	Wrestling	Men's Greco-Roman 85 kg
Silver	Dimitiry Timchenko	Wrestling	Men's Greco-Roman 98 kg
Silver	Tetyana Lavrenchuk	Wrestling	Women's freestyle 58 kg
Silver	Yuliya Tkach	Wrestling	Women's freestyle 63 kg
Bronze	Lidiia Sichenikova; Veronika Marchenko; Anastasia Pavlova	Archery	Women's team
Bronze	Lidiia Sichenikova; Heorhiy Ivanytskyy	Archery	Mixed team
Bronze	Dmytro Zamotayev	Boxing	Men's 49 kg
Bronze	Viktor Petrov	Boxing	Men's 64 kg
Bronze	Yaroslav Samofalov	Boxing	Men's 69 kg
Bronze	Oleksandr Khyzhniak	Boxing	Men's 81 kg
Bronze	Mariya Povkh; Anastasiia Todorova	Canoe sprint	Women's K2 200m
Bronze	Diana Shelestyuk	Diving	Women's 1 metre springboard
Bronze	Diana Shelestyuk; Marharyta Dzhusova	Diving	Women's 3 metre synchronized springboard
Bronze	Olena Dmytrash; Yevgeniya Gomon; Oleksandra Gridasova; Valeriia Gudym; Anastasiya Voznyak	Gymnastics	Women's rhythmic group clubs and hoops
Bronze	Iakiv Khammo	Judo	Men's +100 kg
Bronze	Serhiy Drebot; Vitalii Dudchyk; Oleksandr Gordiienko; Iakiv Khammo; Artem Khomula; Quedjau Nhabali; Vadym Synyavsky; Georgii Zantaraia	Judo	Men's team
Bronze	Svitlana Yaromka	Judo	Women's +78 kg
Bronze	Nataliya Nikolaychyk	Judo	Women's Visually impaired 57 kg
Bronze	Razmik Tonoyan	Sambo	Men's +100kg
Bronze	Andriy Khloptsov	Swimming	Men's 50 metre backstroke
Bronze	Maryna Kolesnykova	Swimming	Women's 200 metre backstroke
Bronze	Yana Nariezhna; Yelyzaveta Yakhno	Synchronised swimming	Women's duet
Bronze	Valeriia Aprielieva; Valeriya Berezhna; Veronika Gryshko; Yana Nariezhna; Alina Shynkarenko; Kateryna Tkachova; Yelyzaveta Yakhno; Anna Yesipova	Synchronised swimming	Women's team
Bronze	Valeriia Aprielieva; Valeriya Berezhna; Veronika Gryshko; Yana Nariezhna; Alina Shynkarenko; Kateryna Tkachova; Yelyzaveta Yakhno; Anna Yesipova	Synchronised swimming	Women's free combination
Bronze	Lei Kou	Table tennis	Men's singles
Bronze	Vasyl Shuptar	Wrestling	Men's freestyle 61 kg
Bronze	Valeriy Andriytsev	Wrestling	Men's freestyle 97 kg
Bronze	Dmytro Pyshkov	Wrestling	Men's Greco-Roman 75 kg

== Competitors ==
Ukraine was represented by 240 athletes in 15 sports. Ukraine did not compete in athletics since it was combined with the European Team Championships Third League competition and Ukraine was at that time in the Super League division. Ukraine was represented by the maximum number of athletes in archery, beach soccer, diving, gymnastics, synchronised swimming, table tennis, triathlon and wrestling.

Sport	Men	Women	Total
Archery	3	3	6
Badminton	3	4	7
Basketball	—	4	4
Beach soccer	12	—N/a	12
Boxing	10	2	12
Canoe sprint	7	7	14
Cycling	8	4	12
Diving	4	4	8
Fencing	3	6	9
Gymnastics	10	19	29
Judo	10	7	17
Karate	2	1	3
Sambo	4	2	6
Shooting	8	6	14
Swimming	13	6	19
Synchronised swimming	—N/a	10	10
Table tennis	3	3	6
Taekwondo	—	3	3
Triathlon	3	3	6
Volleyball	4	4	8
Water polo	13	—	13
Wrestling	16	8	24
Total	136	104	240

== Archery ==
Ukraine achieved maximum quotas. Men's team qualified through the performance at the 2014 European Archery Championships in Echmiadzin and women's team through 2015 European Archery Grand Prix in Marathon. Ukraine was the only nation to win a medal in each team event, though it failed to win any individual medal.

Athlete	Event	Ranking round		Round of 64	Round of 32	Round of 16	Quarterfinals	Semifinals	Final / BM	
Athlete	Event	Score	Seed	Opposition Score	Opposition Score	Opposition Score	Opposition Score	Opposition Score	Opposition Score	Rank
Heorhiy Ivanytskyy	Men's individual	677	4	Svilanovic (Serbia); W 6–4	Dielemans (Netherlands); W 7–3	Henckels (Luxembourg); W 6–2	Alvarino Garcia (Spain); L 5–6	Did not advance		5
Markiyan Ivashko	Men's individual	663	18	Faber (Switzerland); W 6–4	Tsybekdorzhiev (Russia); W 6–2	van der Ven (Netherlands); L 1–7	Did not advance			9
Viktor Ruban	Men's individual	663	19	Gazoz (Turkey); W 7–3	Mihalic (Croatia); W 7–1	van den Berg (Netherlands); L 2–6	Did not advance			9
Lidiia Sichenikova	Women's individual	644	10	Gkorila (Greece); W 6–2	Timofeyeva (Belarus); W 6–2	Stepanova (Russia); W 6–5	Jager (Denmark); L 1–7	Did not advance		5
Veronika Marchenko	Women's individual	637	17	Kourouna (Cyprus); W 6–2	Tonetta (Italy); L 3–7	Did not advance				17
Anastasia Pavlova	Women's individual	636	21	Mirca (Moldova); W 6–0	Longova (Slovakia); W 6–4	Psarra (Greece); L 5–6	Did not advance			9
Heorhiy Ivanytskyy; Markiyan Ivashko; Viktor Ruban	Men's team	2003	4	—N/a		Slovenia W 6–2	Italy W 6–2	Netherlands W 5–3	Spain W 5–4	1st place, gold medalist(s)
Lidiia Sichenikova; Veronika Marchenko; Anastasia Pavlova	Women's team	1917	4	—N/a		Netherlands W 5–3	Georgia (Georgia (country)); W 5–4	Belarus L 3–5	Russia W 5–4	3rd place, bronze medalist(s)
Lidiia Sichenikova; Heorhiy Ivanytskyy	Mixed team	1321	4	—N/a		Finland W 6–0	Russia W 6–0	Italy L 1–5	Slovenia W 5–1	3rd place, bronze medalist(s)

== Badminton ==
Ukraine was represented in all competitions.

Athletes	Event	Group stage				Round of 16	Quarterfinals	Semifinals	Final	Rank
Athletes	Event	Opposition Score	Opposition Score	Opposition Score	Rank	Opposition Score	Opposition Score	Opposition Score	Opposition Score	Rank
Dmytro Zavadsky	Men's singles	Navickas (LTU); L	Kisyov (BUL); L	Pang (NED); L	WD	Did not advance				WD
Marija Ulitina	Women's singles	Zechiri (BUL); L 0–2 (11–21, 16–21)	Grudzina (POL); W 2–0 (21–18, 21–18)	Sárosi (HUN); W 2–0 (21–9, 21–14)	2 Q	Madsen (DEN); L 0–2 (11–21, 19–21)	Did not advance			=9
Gennadiy Natarov; Artem Pochtarev	Men's doubles	Bochat / Pietryja (POL); L 0–2 (15–21, 18–21)	Dierickx / Golinski (BEL); L 0–2 (21–23, 20–22)	L. Mihaylov / M. Mihaylov (BUL); W 2–0 (21–14, 21–17)	3	—N/a	Did not advance			=9
Natalya Voytsekh; Yelyzaveta Zharka	Women's doubles	G. Stoeva / S. Stoeva (BUL); L 0–2 (10–21, 16–21)	Pope / Šefere (LAT); W 2–0 (21–19, 21–10)	Annys / Vandenhoucke (BEL); L 0–2 (18–21, 17–21)	3	—N/a	Did not advance			=9
Gennadiy Natarov; Yuliya Kazarinova	Mixed doubles	Nøhr / Thygesen (DEN); L 1–2 (16–21, 21–16, 12–21)	Flis / Stanković (SLO); W 2–0 (21–9, 21–15)	Turgut / Yavuz (TUR); W 2–1 (21–11, 17–21, 21–16)	2 Q	—N/a	Mittelheisser / Fontaine (FRA); L 1–2 (12–21, 24–22, 12–21)	Did not advance		=5

== Basketball 3x3 ==
Ukraine did not qualify for the men's competition.

Women

- Viktoriia Paziuk
- Krystyna Matsko
- Olga Maznichenko
- Ganna Zarytska

Team	Event	Group stage				Round of 16	Quarterfinals	Semifinals	Final / BM	
Team	Event	Opposition Score	Opposition Score	Opposition Score	Rank	Opposition Score	Opposition Score	Opposition Score	Opposition Score	Rank
Ukraine	Women's tournament	Czech Republic; W 15–11	Turkey; W 19–11	Belgium; W 17–12	1 Q	Slovakia; W 16–8	Greece; W 21–19	Slovenia; W 21–16	Russia; L 17–22	2nd place, silver medalist(s)

== Beach soccer ==
Ukraine qualified through the 2014 Euro Beach Soccer League by placing 6th in Division A.

Men

- Kostiantyn Andrieev
- Andrii Borsuk
- Ihor Borsuk
- Oleh Budzko
- Volodymyr Hladchenko
- Oleksandr Korniychuk
- Dmytro Medvid
- Roman Pachev
- Viktor Panteleychuk
- Vitalii Sydorenko
- Dmytro Voitenko
- Oleh Zborovskyi

Team	Event	Group stage				Semifinals / Pl	Final / BM / Pl	
Team	Event	Opposition Score	Opposition Score	Opposition Score	Rank	Opposition Score	Opposition Score	Rank
Ukraine	Men's tournament	Azerbaijan; W 3–1	Portugal; L 4–5 (a.e.t.)	Switzerland; L 4–5	3	Hungary; W 4–2	Spain; L 3–6	6

== Boxing ==
Ukraine qualified a male in each category. In women's boxing, Ukraine managed to qualify only in two categories out of five.

Men

Athlete	Category	Round of 32	Round of 16	Quarterfinals	Semifinals	Final	
Athlete	Category	Opposition Result	Opposition Result	Opposition Result	Opposition Result	Opposition Result	Rank
Dmytro Zamotayev	49 kg	—N/a	Bye	Neumann (GER); W 3–0	Irvine (IRL); L 0–3	Did not advance	3rd place, bronze medalist(s)
Ihor Sopinskiy	52 kg	Bye	Touba (GER); L 0–3	did not advance			
Iurii Shestak	56 kg	D'Andrea (ITA); L 1–2	did not advance				
Tymur Beliak	60 kg	McComb (IRL); L 0–3	did not advance				
Viktor Petrov	64 kg	Ismetov (BUL); W 3–0	Bachkov (ARM); W 3–0	Goyeram (SWE); W 2–1	Sotomayor (AZE); L 0–3	Did not advance	3rd place, bronze medalist(s)
Yaroslav Samofalov	69 kg	Kostecki (POL); W 3–0	Chamov (BUL); W 3–0	Abashidze (GEO); W 2–1	Besputin (RUS); L 0–3	Did not advance	3rd place, bronze medalist(s)
Vladyslav Voitaliuk	75 kg	Chartoi (SWE); W 3–0	Harcsa (HUN); L 0–3	did not advance			
Oleksandr Khyzhniak	81 kg	Bye	Pantaleev (BUL); W 2–1	Xhoxhaj (KOS); W 2–1	Manfredonia (ITA); L 1–2	Did not advance	3rd place, bronze medalist(s)
Gevorg Manukian	91 kg	Hošek (CZE); W 3–0	Dimitrov (BUL); W 3–0	O'Neill (IRL); W 2–1	Filipi (CRO); W TKO-I	Abdullayev (AZE); L WO	2nd place, silver medalist(s)
Vladyslav Sirenko	+91 kg	Bakhtidze (GEO); L 0–3	did not advance				

Women

Athlete	Category	Round of 16	Quarterfinals	Semifinals	Final	
Athlete	Category	Opposition Result	Opposition Result	Opposition Result	Opposition Result	Rank
Tetyana Kob	51 kg	Coşkun (TUR); L 1–2	did not advance			
Kateryna Shambir	75 kg	Amato (ITA); W 2–1	Fontijn (NED); L 0–3	did not advance		

== Canoe sprint ==
Ukraine did not compete in men's C-1 1000 m and K-4 1000 m.

Men

Athlete	Event	Heat		Semi-final		Final	
Athlete	Event	Time	Rank	Time	Rank	Time	Rank
Yuriy Cheban	C-1 200 m	40.120	3 QS	38.790	3 QFA	41.036	8
Dmytro Ianchuk; Taras Mishchuk	C-2 1000 m	3:38.452	3 QF	Bye		3:35.561	5
Aleksandr Senkevych	K-1 200 m	36.774	7 QS	35.720	6 QFB	37.329	14
Vitaliy Tsurkan	K-1 1000 m	3:44.533	5 QS	3:31.925	6 QFB	3:40.063	17
Vitaliy Tsurkan	K-1 5000 m	—N/a				21:50.950	13
Ievgen Karabuta; Igor Trunov	K-2 200 m	32.569	5 QS	31.922	6	Did not advance	
Igor Trunov; Aleksandr Senkevych	K-2 1000 m	3:54.614	8	Did not advance			

Women

Athlete	Event	Heat		Semi-final		Final	
Athlete	Event	Time	Rank	Time	Rank	Time	Rank
Svitlana Rymkevych	K-1 200 m	42.566	4 QS	42.064	7 QFB	45.483	17
Svitlana Rymkevych	K-1 500 m	1:54.723	5 QS	1:56.704	8	Did not advance	
Svitlana Rymkevych	K-1 5000 m	—N/a				25:09.469	15
Mariya Povkh; Anastasiia Todorova	K-2 200 m	37.439	2 QF	Bye		37.719	3rd place, bronze medalist(s)
Anastasiya Horlova; Liudmyla Galushko	K-2 500 m	1:46.289	5 QS	1:44.501	6	Did not advance	
Mariia Kichasova; Mariya Povkh; Anastasiia Todorova; Inna Hryshchun	K-4 500 m	1:35.613	3 QF	Bye		1:35.325	6

== Cycling ==
Ukraine did not compete in women's BMX.

=== Road ===
Men

Athlete	Event	Time	Rank
Andriy Hrivko	Men's road race	5:27:25	2nd place, silver medalist(s)
Andriy Hrivko	Men's road time trial	1:01:22.63	4
Andriy Vasylyuk	Men's road race	No time	DNF
Andriy Vasylyuk	Men's road time trial	1:03:49.33	18
Vitaliy Buts	Men's road race	5:28:26	14
Mykhaylo Kononenko	Men's road race	5:33:35	25
Denys Kostyuk	Men's road race	5:33:48	85
Oleksandr Polivoda	Men's road race	No time	DNF

Women

Athlete	Event	Time	Rank
Hanna Solovey	Women's road race	3:25:53	10
Hanna Solovey	Women's road time trial	33:03.37	2nd place, silver medalist(s)
Tetyana Ryabchenko	Women's road race	3:25:53	18
Olena Demydova	Women's road race	No time	DNF

=== Mountain bike ===
Athlete	Event	Time	Rank
Serhiy Rysenko	Men's cross country	1:48:37	16
Yana Belomoyna	Women's cross country	1:35:47	7

=== BMX ===
Athlete	Event	Time trials				Motos							
Athlete	Event	Qualifying		Superfinal		Heat				Semifinal		Final	
Athlete	Event	Time	Rank	Time	Rank	1st run (rank)	2nd run (rank)	3rd run (rank)	Total (rank)	Time	Rank	Time	Rank
Vladyslav Sapozhnykov	Men's BMX	38.907	29	Did not advance		39.457 (7)	38.228 (7)	38.611 (7)	21 (8)	Did not advance			

== Diving ==
Ukraine was represented in all event by the maximum number of athletes.

Men

Athlete	Event	Qualification		Final	
Athlete	Event	Points	Rank	Points	Rank
Vitalii Levchenko	Men's 1 metre springboard	334.70	25	did not qualify	
Vitalii Levchenko	Men's 3 metre springboard	395.60	24	did not qualify	
Nikita Kryvopyshyn	Men's 1 metre springboard	377.30	17	did not qualify	
Nikita Kryvopyshyn	Men's 10 metre platform	378.25	15	did not qualify	
Mykyta Rudenko	Men's 3 metre springboard	425.40	20	did not qualify	
Yevhen Naumenko	Men's 10 metre platform	411.20	9	366.75	12
Nikita Kryvopyshyn; Vitalii Levchenko	Men's synchronized 3 metre springboard	—N/a		255.78	7

Women

Athlete	Event	Qualification		Final	
Athlete	Event	Points	Rank	Points	Rank
Diana Shelestyuk	Women's 1 metre springboard	359.70	10	388.45	3rd place, bronze medalist(s)
Diana Shelestyuk	Women's 3 metre springboard	409.60	6	405.75	6
Marharyta Dzhusova	Women's 1 metre springboard	314.25	22	did not qualify	
Marharyta Dzhusova	Women's 3 metre springboard	353.85	13	did not qualify	
Vlada Tatsenko	Women's 10 metre platform	338.85	9	343.15	7
Valeriia Liulko	Women's 10 metre platform	315.00	13	did not qualify	
Marharyta Dzhusova; Diana Shelestyuk	Women's synchronized 3 metre springboard	—N/a		264.87	3rd place, bronze medalist(s)

== Fencing ==
Ukraine did not manage to qualify a team in men's competition, since only Top-5 or Top-6 (considering the host quota) in FIE Official Team Ranking were able to qualify, but all male competitors as well as Olga Leleyko and Yana Shemyakina qualified through FIE Official Individual Ranking without the need to compete in the Qualification Tournament.

Andriy Yahodka unexpectedly became the champion, while Olha Kharlan failed to qualify even for knock-out stage.

Men's

Athlete	Event	Preliminaries		Round of 32	Round of 16	Quarterfinals	Semifinals	Final / BM	
Athlete	Event	Victories/Bouts	Rank in total	Opposition Score	Opposition Score	Opposition Score	Opposition Score	Opposition Score	Rank
Bohdan Nikishyn	Épée	5/6	1	Bye	Verwijlen (Netherlands); L 8–15	Did not advance			
Klod Yunes	Foil	3/5	14	Jovanović (Croatia); W 15–13	Arslanov (Russia); L 10–15	Did not advance			
Andriy Yahodka	Sabre	3/5	13	Ravasz (Hungary); W 15–9	Murolo (Italy); W 15–13	Badea (Romania); W 15–8	Pellegrini (Italy); W 15–11	Dolniceanu (Romania); W 15–10	1st place, gold medalist(s)

Women's

Athlete	Event	Preliminaries		Round of 32	Round of 16	Quarterfinals	Semifinals	Final / BM	
Athlete	Event	Victories/Bouts	Rank in total	Opposition Score	Opposition Score	Opposition Score	Opposition Score	Opposition Score	Rank
Yana Shemyakina	Épée	6/6	1	Bye	Kirpu (Estonia); L 13–14	Did not advance			
Olga Leleyko	Foil	1/5	35	Did not advance					
Alina Komashchuk	Sabre	2/5	23	Criscio (Italy); W 15–7	Limbach (Germany); W 15–8	Bunyatova (Azerbaijan); L 11–15	Did not advance		
Olena Kravatska	Sabre	4/5	4	—N/a	Sukhova (Russia); W 15–13	Rifkiss (France); L 10–15	Did not advance		
Olha Zhovnir	Sabre	2/5	21	Kovaleva (Russia); W 15–14	Rifkiss (France); L 12–15	Did not advance			
Olha Kharlan	Sabre	1/5	29	Did not advance					
Olha Kharlan; Alina Komashchuk; Olena Kravatska; Olha Zhovnir	Team sabre	—N/a				(Azerbaijan); W 45–24	(Russia); W 45–34	(Italy); W 45–43	1st place, gold medalist(s)

== Gymnastics ==
Ukraine was represented in all events and had maximum number of quotas.

=== Acrobatic ===
Ukraine qualified through the 2014 Acrobatic Gymnastics World Championships which was the only qualification criterion for the Games.

Women's groups

Athletes	Event	Qualification		Final	
Athletes	Event	Points	Rank	Points	Rank
Nadiia Kotliar; Diana Panchuk; Hanna Patchenko	All-around	54.970	5	82.340	4
Nadiia Kotliar; Diana Panchuk; Hanna Patchenko	Balance	27.560	6	27.410	5
Nadiia Kotliar; Diana Panchuk; Hanna Patchenko	Dynamic	27.410	5	27.810	4

Mixed pairs

Athletes	Event	Qualification		Final	
Athletes	Event	Points	Rank	Points	Rank
Yelyzaveta Vasylyga; Oleksandr Shpyn	All-around	55.570	4	82.950	4
Yelyzaveta Vasylyga; Oleksandr Shpyn	Balance	28.040	4 Q	27.790	4
Yelyzaveta Vasylyga; Oleksandr Shpyn	Dynamic	27.530	4 Q	27.830	4

=== Aerobic ===
Ukraine qualified a total of six athletes after the performance at the 2013 Aerobic Gymnastics European Championships. One gymnast from pairs had to compete in the group event making the total athletes to 6.

Athletes	Event	Qualification		Final	
Athletes	Event	Points	Rank	Points	Rank
Anastasiia Isaienko; Maksym Buben	Mixed pairs	18.000	9	Did not advance	
Oleksandr Boldariev; Maksym Buben; Volodymyr Doroshenko; Darya Gutsalyuk; Iurii Shvaiko	Mixed groups	17.000	11	Did not advance	

=== Artistic ===
At the Games, Ukrainian male gymnasts managed to qualify for all apparatus finals (the limitation was one competitor from a country in a final) while no Ukrainian female athlete got to any apparatus final.

==== Men ====
Team all-around and individual qualifications

Athlete	Event	Apparatus						Total	Team total	Team rank
Athlete	Event	F	PH	R	V	PB	HB	Total	Team total	Team rank
Oleh Verniaiev	Men's artistic team all-around	15.100 q	14.700 q	15.200	15.466 q	15.666 q	15.400 q	91.532 q	177.429	2nd place, silver medalist(s)
Mykyta Yermak	Men's artistic team all-around	14.466	13.566	13.900	14.066	13.300	13.733	83.031	177.429	2nd place, silver medalist(s)
Ihor Radivilov	Men's artistic team all-around	13.633	—N/a	15.566 q	15.266	—N/a	13.733	DNC	177.429	2nd place, silver medalist(s)

All-around

Athlete	Event	Apparatus						Total	Rank
Athlete	Event	F	PH	R	V	PB	HB	Total	Rank
Oleh Verniaiev	All-around	14.533	15.900	14.900	15.300	14.933	14.766	90.332	1st place, gold medalist(s)

Apparatus finals

Athlete	Event	Total	Rank
Oleh Verniaiev	Vault	15.266	1st place, gold medalist(s)
Oleh Verniaiev	Floor	14.233	6
Oleh Verniaiev	Parallel bars	14.633	5
Oleh Verniaiev	Horizontal bar	14.900	5
Oleh Verniaiev	Pommel horse	13.833	5
Ihor Radivilov	Rings	13.866	6

==== Women ====
Team all-around and individual qualifications

Athlete	Event	Apparatus				Total	Team total	Team rank
Athlete	Event	V	UB	BB	F	Total	Team total	Team rank
Angelina Kysla	Women's artistic team all-around	13.733	13.566	11.433	11.700	50.432 q	98.698	14
Krystyna Sankova	Women's artistic team all-around	14.100	10.566	12.100	11.133	47,899	98.698	14
Yana Fedorova	Women's artistic team all-around	12.533	10.366	11.700	11.233	45,832	98.698	14

All-around

Athlete	Event	Apparatus				Total	Rank
Athlete	Event	V	UB	BB	F	Total	Rank
Angelina Kysla	All-around	13.666	12.666	12.633	11.666	50.631	14

=== Rhythmic ===
Ukraine qualified two athletes for individual competition and a group after the performance at the 2013 Rhythmic Gymnastics European Championships.

At the Games, Hanna Rizatdinova also managed to qualify for all apparatus finals. Viktoria Mazur was a reserve athlete.

All-around final and apparatus qualification

Athlete	Event	Final					
Athlete	Event	Hoop	Ball	Clubs	Ribbon	Total	Final rank
Hanna Rizatdinova	Individual all-around	18.300	18.050 q	18.150	18.250	72.750	4
Eleonora Romanova	Individual all-around	16.850	15.450	16.950	17.000	66.250	16

Apparatus finals

Athlete	Event	Final				
Athlete	Event	D score	E score	Penalty	Total	Rank
Hanna Rizatdinova	Ball	9.100	9.150		18.250	2nd place, silver medalist(s)
Hanna Rizatdinova	Clubs	9.250	9.300		18.550	2nd place, silver medalist(s)
Hanna Rizatdinova	Hoop	7.400	8.550	0.05	15.900	6
Hanna Rizatdinova	Ribbon	8.700	8.900		17.600	5

Group all-around and qualification

Athletes	Event	Final			
Athletes	Event	5 apps	3+2 apps	Total	Rank
Olena Dmytrash; Yevgeniya Gomon; Oleksandra Gridasova; Valeriia Gudym; Anastasiya Voznyak	Group all-around	17.050 q	17.100 q	34.150	6

Group finals

Athletes	Event	Final				
Athletes	Event	D score	E score	Penalty	Total	Rank
Olena Dmytrash; Yevgeniya Gomon; Oleksandra Gridasova; Valeriia Gudym; Anastasiya Voznyak	Group 2 hoops and 6 clubs	8.250	8.850		17.100	3rd place, bronze medalist(s)
Olena Dmytrash; Yevgeniya Gomon; Oleksandra Gridasova; Valeriia Gudym; Anastasiya Voznyak	Group 5 ribbons	8.600	8.700	0.05	17.250	2nd place, silver medalist(s)

=== Trampoline ===
Ukraine qualified two athletes based on the results at the 2014 European Trampoline Championships. The gymnasts competed in both the individual and the synchronized event.

Athletes	Event	Qualification				Final					
Athletes	Event	Routine 1	Routine 2	Total	Rank	D	E	ToF/S	Penalty	Total	Rank
Dmytro Byedyevkin	Men's trampoline	48.135	56.190	104.325	8 R1	Did not advance					
Mykola Prostorov	Men's trampoline	47.065	55.000	102.065	13	Did not advance					
Dmytro Byedyevkin; Mykola Prostorov	Men's synchronized trampoline	38.200	10.800	49.000	10	Did not advance					
Nataliia Moskvina	Women's trampoline	45.230	52.965	98.195	7 Q	14.400	23.400	15.400		53.200	4
Maryna Kyiko	Women's trampoline	47.080	36.350	83.430	18	Did not advance					
Maryna Kyiko; Nataliia Moskvina	Women's synchronized trampoline	39.000	47.700	86.700	1 Q	4.900	6.200	7.200		18.300	6

== Judo ==
Ukraine was not represented in the men's 60 kg, women's 57 kg, women's 63 kg, women's 70 kg and women's team.

Men

Athlete	Category	Round of 64	Round of 32	Round of 16	Quarterfinals	Semifinals	Final	
Athlete	Category	Opposition Result	Opposition Result	Opposition Result	Opposition Result	Opposition Result	Opposition Result	Rank
Georgii Zantaraia	66 kg	—N/a	Gomboc (SLO); W 100–000	Larose (FRA); W 000–000	Khan-Magomedov (RUS); L 000–100	Shikhalizada (AZE); L 010–100	Did not advance	7
Artem Khomula	73 kg	Szwarnowiecki (POL); L 000–100	Did not advance					
Serhiy Drebot	73 kg	Bye	Ramosacaj (ALB); W 100–000	Elmont (NED); L 000–010	Did not advance			
Vitalii Dudchyk	81 kg	Bye	Krizsán (HUN); W 100–000	Nacimiento (ESP); W 010–000	Nifontov (RUS); L 000–101	Pietri (FRA); L 000–110	Did not advance	7
Quedjau Nhabali	90 kg	Bye	Jurečka (CZE); W 010–000	Kukolj (SRB); L 000–100	Did not advance			
Vadym Synyavsky	90 kg	Bye	Sherazadishvili (ESP); L 010–010	Did not advance				
Artem Bloshenko	100 kg	—N/a	Korrel (NED); L 000–010	Did not advance				
Iakiv Khammo	+100 kg	—N/a	Harmegnies (BEL); W 010–000	Simionescu (ROU); W 110–000	Saidov (RUS); L 000–000	Meyer (NED); W 111–000	Paškevičius (LTU); W 013–000	3rd place, bronze medalist(s)
Oleksandr Gordiienko	+100 kg	—N/a	Ņikiforenko (LAT); W 100–001	Breitbarth (GER); L 000–110	Did not advance			
Serhiy Drebot; Vitalii Dudchyk; Oleksandr Gordiienko; Iakiv Khammo; Artem Khomula; Quedjau Nhabali; Vadym Synyavsky; Georgii Zantaraia	Men's team	—N/a		Slovenia; W 3–2	Russia; L 1–4	Portugal; W 3–2	Hungary; W 3–2	3rd place, bronze medalist(s)
Oleksandr Pominov	Blind +90 kg	—N/a			Mislimov (AZE); W 100–000	Parasiuk (RUS); W 100–000	Zakiyev (AZE); L 000–100	2nd place, silver medalist(s)

Women

Athlete	Category	Round of 32	Round of 16	Quarterfinals	Semifinals	Final	
Athlete	Category	Opposition Result	Opposition Result	Opposition Result	Opposition Result	Opposition Result	Rank
Maryna Cherniak	48 kg	Bye	Pupp (HUN); W 001–000	Moscatt (ITA); W 002–000	Şahin (TUR); L 000–004	Csernoviczki (HUN); W 000–100	5
Tetiana Levytska	52 kg	Nareks (SLO); W 111–000	Kazarina (RUS); W 002–000	Kräh (GER); L 000–001	Giuffrida (ITA); L 000–000	Did not advance	7
Victoriia Turks	78 kg	Bye	Gibbons (GBR); W 100–000	Velenšek (SLO); L 000–000	Steenhuis (NED); L 000–100	Did not advance	7
Svitlana Iaromka	+78 kg	Bye	Adlington (GBR); W 101–001	Kaya (TUR); L 000–100	Kindzerska (UKR); W 100–000	Slutskaya (BLR); W 100–000	3rd place, bronze medalist(s)
Iryna Kindzerska	+78 kg	Bye	Marchio (ITA); W 100–000	Andéol (FRA); L 000–000	Iaromka (UKR); L 000–100	Did not advance	7
Inna Cherniak	Blind 57 kg	—N/a		Ovchinnikova (RUS); W 100–000	Brussig (GER); W 101–000	Abdullayeva (AZE); W 100–001	1st place, gold medalist(s)
Nataliya Nikolaychyk	Blind 57 kg	—N/a		Köseoğlu (TUR); W 101–000	Abdullayeva (AZE); L 000–011	Kılıç (TUR); W 100–000	3rd place, bronze medalist(s)

== Karate ==
Ukrainian athletes managed to qualify for just 3 out of 12 events in karate. Ukraine was represented only in kumite competitions.

Men

Athlete	Category	Group stage				Semifinals	Final	
Athlete	Category	Opposition Result	Opposition Result	Opposition Result	Rank	Opposition Result	Opposition Result	Rank
Illya Nikulin	75 kg	Aghayev (AZE); L 0–3	Sadikovs (LAT); D 1–1	Eltemur (TUR); L 0–4	4	Did not advance		
Yaroslav Horuna	84 kg	Grillon (FRA); W 1–0	Mamayev (AZE); L 3–6	Tzanos (GRE); L 0–8	3	Did not advance		

Women

Athlete	Category	Group stage				Semifinals	Final	
Athlete	Category	Opposition Result	Opposition Result	Opposition Result	Rank	Opposition Result	Opposition Result	Rank
Kateryna Kryva	50 kg	Recchia (FRA); D 0–0	Bugur (GER); W 1–0	Koulinkvich (BLR); D 0–0	2 Q	Özçelik (TUR); L 0–0	Recchia (FRA); L 0–0	4

== Sambo ==
Ukrainian athletes competed in 6 out of 8 events (except for women's 52 kg and women's 60 kg).

Men

Athlete	Category	Round of 16	Quarterfinals	Semifinals/Repechage	Final/Bronze medal bout	
Athlete	Category	Opposition Result	Opposition Result	Opposition Result	Opposition Result	Rank
Oleksii Poltavtsev	57 kg	—N/a	Burdz (BLR); L 0–4	Did not advance		
Dmytro Babiichuk	74 kg	Bye	Sidakov (RUS); L 1–3	Did not advance		
Ivan Vasylchuk	90 kg	—N/a	Gasimov (AZE); L 0–2	Did not advance		
Razmik Tonoyan	+100 kg	—N/a	Cekic (AUT); W 4–0	Safarbayov (AZE); L 0–2	Mashovikj (MKD); W 4–0	3rd place, bronze medalist(s)

Women

Athlete	Category	Round of 16	Quarterfinals	Semifinals/Repechage	Final/Bronze medal bout	
Athlete	Category	Opposition Result	Opposition Result	Opposition Result	Opposition Result	Rank
Olena Sayko	64 kg	Bye	Loko (FRA); W 3–1	Cretu (MDA); W	Matsko (BLR); L 0–2	2nd place, silver medalist(s)
Nadiya Gerasymenko	68 kg	Bye	Zakhartsova (RUS); L 1–3	Did not advance		

== Shooting ==
Ukraine athletes managed to qualify for almost all events with the exception of men's trap, men's double trap, women's trap and, respectively, mixed team trap. Ukraine was represented in majority of events by two shooters, except for both men's and women's skeet competitions as well as women's 25 metre pistol.

Though Ukrainian athletes reached several finals, they failed to win a medal. Ukraine became together with the Czech Republic the biggest team in shooting that has not won a medal.

Athlete	Event	Qualification		Semifinal		Final	
Athlete	Event	Points	Rank	Points	Rank	Points	Rank
Oleh Omelchuk	Men's 10 metre air pistol	583-24x	1 Q	—N/a		117.0	6
Oleh Omelchuk	Men's 50 metre pistol	567-9x	2 Q	—N/a		147.9	4
Pavlo Korostylov	Men's 10 metre air pistol	581-14x	6 Q	—N/a		138.2	5
Pavlo Korostylov	Men's 50 metre pistol	544-7x	19	—N/a		DNA	
Roman Bondaruk	Men's 25 metre rapid fire pistol	582-16x	6 Q	—N/a		11	5
Denys Kushnirov	Men's 25 metre rapid fire pistol	572-16x	14	—N/a		DNA	
Oleh Tsarkov	Men's 10 m air rifle	627.0	4 Q	—N/a		163.4	4
Serhiy Kulish	Men's 10 m air rifle	626.9	6 Q	—N/a		81.5	8
Serhiy Kulish	Men's 50 metre rifle prone	1140-34x	23	—N/a		DNA	
Serhiy Kulish	Men's 50 metre rifle three positions	608.7	32	—N/a		DNA	
Yuriy Sukhorukov	Men's 50 metre rifle prone	614.3	13	—N/a		DNA	
Yuriy Sukhorukov	Men's 50 metre rifle three positions	1157-46x	3 Q	—N/a		401.5	7
Mykola Milchev	Men's skeet	121	9	DNA			
Olena Kostevych	Women's 10 metre air pistol	386-15x	5 Q	—N/a		157.9	4
Olena Kostevych	Women's 25 metre pistol	583-17x	4 Q	11	6	DNA	
Polina Konarieva	Women's 10 metre air pistol	376-10x	21	—N/a		DNA	
Natallia Kalnysh	Women's 10 metre air rifle	413.2	13	—N/a		DNA	
Natallia Kalnysh	Women's 50 metre rifle three positions	580-28x	3 Q	—N/a		397.2	8
Olga Golubchenko	Women's 10 metre air rifle	410.3	30	—N/a		DNA	
Lessia Leskiv	Women's 50 metre rifle three positions	577-21x	16	—N/a		DNA	
Viktoriia Cherviakova	Women's skeet	69	10	DNA			
Olena Kostevych; Oleh Omelchuk	Mixed team 10 metre air pistol	477-16x	5 Q	197.0	3	DNA	
Olga Golubchenko; Oleh Tsarkov	Mixed team 10 metre air rifle	513.8	11	DNA			
Viktoriia Cherviakova; Mikola Milchev	Mixed team skeet	89	8	DNA			

== Swimming ==
Ukraine did not compete in men's 1500 m freestyle, men's 100 m backstroke, women's 50 m freestyle, women's 100 m freestyle, women's 1500 m freestyle, women's 50 m butterfly, women's 100 m butterfly, women's 200 m butterfly, women's 4 × 100 m freestyle relay, women's 4 × 200 m freestyle relay.

Men

Athlete	Event	Heat		Semifinal		Final	
Athlete	Event	Time	Rank	Time	Rank	Time	Rank
Sergii Shevtsov	50 m freestyle	23.36	17 Q	23.49	15	Did not advance	
Sergii Shevtsov	100 m freestyle	50.81	5 Q	50.54	5 Q	50.32	5
Sergii Shevtsov	50 m butterfly	24.35	6 Q	24.54	14	Did not advance	
Ivan Denysenko	50 m freestyle	23.59	22	Did not advance			
Ivan Denysenko	100 m freestyle	51.71	32	Did not advance			
Vladyslav Perepelytsia	50 m freestyle	23.68	27	Did not advance			
Vladyslav Perepelytsia	100 m freestyle	51.41	24	Did not advance			
Viacheslav Ohnov	50 m freestyle	23.73	28	Did not advance			
Viacheslav Ohnov	100 m freestyle	51.05	13 Q	1:56.64	15	Did not advance	
Viacheslav Ohnov	200 m freestyle	1:55.09	39	Did not advance			
Kyrylo Garaschenko	400 m freestyle	3:58.12	20	—N/a		Did not advance	
Kyrylo Garaschenko	800 m freestyle	—N/a				8:23.80	20
Andriy Khloptsov	50 m backstroke	26.02	4 Q	25.84	3 Q	25.71	3rd place, bronze medalist(s)
Andriy Khloptsov	50 m butterfly	24.29	5 Q	23.90	1 Q	23.92	1st place, gold medalist(s)
Dmytro Prozhoha	50 m backstroke	27.56	31	Did not advance			
Dmytro Prozhoha	50 m butterfly	24.61	12	Did not advance			
Dmytro Prozhoha	100 m butterfly	56.37	33	Did not advance			
Denys Martyniuk	200 m backstroke	2:14.19	37	Did not advance			
Denys Martyniuk	200 m butterfly	2:07.16	26	Did not advance			
Denys Martyniuk	400 m individual medley	4:43.43	42	—N/a		Did not advance	
Yevgen Kurkin	50 m breaststroke	28.65	9 Q	28.53	8 Q	28.74	8
Yevgen Kurkin	100 m breaststroke	1:04.77	25	Did not advance			
Yevgen Kurkin	200 m breaststroke	2:26.39	31	Did not advance			
Igor Proskura	50 m breaststroke	30.33	36	Did not advance			
Igor Proskura	100 m breaststroke	1:06.03	34	Did not advance			
Igor Proskura	200 m breaststroke	2:21.99	26	Did not advance			
Igor Proskura	400 m individual medley	4:45.30	44	—N/a		Did not advance	
Illia Pidvalnyi	100 m butterfly	55.91	22	Did not advance			
Illia Pidvalnyi	200 m individual medley	2:11.74	41	Did not advance			
Nazarii Kosylo	100 m butterfly	58.02	50	Did not advance			
Nazarii Kosylo	200 m butterfly	2:08.62	30	Did not advance			
Ivan Adamovych	200 m butterfly	2:04.53	20	Did not advance			
Ivan Adamovych	400 m individual medley	4:47.45	45	—N/a		Did not advance	
Vladyslav Perepelytsia; Ivan Denysenko; Viacheslav Ohnov; Sergii Shevtsov	4 × 100 m freestyle relay	3:21.52	1 Q	—N/a		3:21.06	4
Kyrylo Garaschenko; Vladyslav Perepelytsia; Illia Pidvalnyi; Viacheslav Ohnov	4 × 200 m freestyle relay	7:44.67	11	—N/a		Did not advance	
Ukraine	4 × 100 m medley relay	DNS		—N/a		Did not advance	

Women

Athlete	Event	Heat		Semifinal		Final	
Athlete	Event	Time	Rank	Time	Rank	Time	Rank
Valeriia Timchenko	200 m freestyle	2:11.03	50	Did not advance			
Valeriia Timchenko	400 m freestyle	4:26.88	23	—N/a		Did not advance	
Valeriia Timchenko	800 m freestyle	—N/a				9:07.82	14
Maryna Kolesnykova	50 m backstroke	29.83	9 Q	29.72	10	Did not advance	
Maryna Kolesnykova	100 m backstroke	1:02.59	4 Q	1:02.34	4 Q	1:02.25	4
Maryna Kolesnykova	200 m backstroke	2:16.51	5 Q	2:14.20	4 Q	2:11.91	3rd place, bronze medalist(s)
Margaryta Bokan	50 m backstroke	30.08	12 Q	29.75	11	Did not advance	
Margaryta Bokan	100 m backstroke	1:05.28	18	Did not advance			
Margaryta Bokan	200 m backstroke	2:21.31	20	Did not advance			
Vladyslava Maznytska	50 m backstroke	30.95	35	Did not advance			
Vladyslava Maznytska	100 m backstroke	1:05.64	22	Did not advance			
Vladyslava Maznytska	200 m backstroke	2:24.14	24	Did not advance			
Tetiana Kudako	100 m backstroke	1:12.07	39	Did not advance			
Tetiana Kudako	50 m breaststroke	35.56	33	Did not advance			
Tetiana Kudako	200 m breaststroke	2:39.24	23	Did not advance			
Tetiana Kudako	200 m individual medley	2:26.19	31	Did not advance			
Tetiana Kudako	400 m individual medley	5:16.70	20	—N/a		Did not advance	
Yuliya Gnidenko	50 m breaststroke	34.81	31	Did not advance			
Yuliya Gnidenko	100 m breaststroke	1:15.22	32	Did not advance			
Yuliya Gnidenko	200 m breaststroke	2:40.22	27	Did not advance			
Maryna Kolesnykova; Yuliya Gnidenko; Tetiana Kudako; Valeriia Timchenko	4 × 100 m medley relay	4:23.97	12	—N/a		Did not advance	

Mixed

Athlete	Event	Heat		Semifinal		Final	
Athlete	Event	Time	Rank	Time	Rank	Time	Rank
Ivan Denysenko; Valeriia Timchenko; Margaryta Bokan; Viacheslav Ohnov	4 × 100 m freestyle relay	3:42.88	10	—N/a		Did not advance	
Vladyslava Maznytska; Yevgen Kurkin; Tetiana Kudako; Ivan Denysenko	4 × 100 m medley relay	4:06.25	11	—N/a		Did not advance	

== Synchronised swimming ==
Ukraine was represented in all events. Mariana Serikova and Oleksandra Filonenko were reserve athletes.

Athlete	Event	Qualification		Final	
Athlete	Event	Points	Rank	Points	Rank
Yelyzaveta Yakhno	Solo	159.9212	4	159.6878	4
Yana Nariezhna; Yelyzaveta Yakhno	Duet	161.8833	2	161.6500	3rd place, bronze medalist(s)
Valeriia Aprielieva; Valeriya Berezhna; Veronika Gryshko; Yana Nariezhna; Alina Shynkarenko; Kateryna Tkachova; Yelyzaveta Yakhno; Anna Yesipova	Team	158.4193	3	159.0860	3rd place, bronze medalist(s)
Valeriia Aprielieva; Valeriya Berezhna; Veronika Gryshko; Yana Nariezhna; Alina Shynkarenko; Kateryna Tkachova; Yelyzaveta Yakhno; Anna Yesipova	Combination	86.4667	3	86.8667	3rd place, bronze medalist(s)

== Table tennis ==
Ukraine qualified for all events and had maximum number of quotas.

Individual

Athlete	Event	Round 1	Round 2	Round 3	Quarterfinals	Semifinals	Final/Bronze medal game	
Athlete	Event	Opposition Result	Opposition Result	Opposition Result	Opposition Result	Opposition Result	Opposition Result	Rank
Kou Lei	Men's singles	Cioti (ROU); W 4–1	Gionis (GRE); W 4–2	Fegerl (AUT); W 4–1	Pitchford (GBR); W 4–1	Samsonov (BLR); L 1–4	Drinkhall (GBR); W 4–2	3rd place, bronze medalist(s)
Ivan Katkov	Men's singles	Tokič (SLO); L 0–4	Did not advance					
Margaryta Pesotska	Women's singles	Bye	Tian (CRO); W 4–1	Ni (LUX); W 4–2	Ódorová (SVK); L 1–4	Did not advance		
Tetyana Bilenko	Women's singles	Bye	Balážová (SVK); W 4–3	Hu (TUR); L 1–4	Did not advance			

Team

Athlete	Event	First round	Quarterfinals	Semifinals	Final	
Athlete	Event	Opposition Result	Opposition Result	Opposition Result	Opposition Result	Rank
Kou Lei; Yaroslav Zhmudenko; Ivan Katkov	Men's team	Sweden; L 0–3	Did not advance			
Hanna Haponova; Tetyana Bilenko; Margaryta Pesotska	Women's team	Belarus; W 3–1	Sweden; W 3–0	Netherlands; L 2–3	Czech Republic; L 1–3	4

== Taekwondo ==
Ukraine was not represented in all men's categories and women's 57 kg.

Women

Athlete	Category	Round of 16	Quarterfinals	Semifinals	Final	
Athlete	Category	Opposition Result	Opposition Result	Opposition Result	Opposition Result	Rank
Iryna Romoldanova	49 kg	Maddock (GBR); L 7–8	Did not advance	Nicoli (ITA); L 0–4	Did not advance	
Tetiana Tetereviatnykova	67 kg	Baryshnikova (RUS); L 4–6	Did not advance	Krzemieniecka (POL); W 4–2	Johansson (SWE); L 1–2	5
Maryna Konieva	+67 kg	Tedeeva (AZE); W 10–4	Walkden (GBR); W 14–13	Mandić (SRB); L 1–15	Ivanova (RUS); L 3–7	5

== Triathlon ==
Ukraine gained the maximum number of quotas.

Athlete	Event	Time	Rank
Yegor Martynenko	Men	1:50:11	10
Oleksiy Syutkin	Men	1:50:58	15
Ivan Ivanov	Men	1:53:31	28
Yuliya Yelistratova	Women	2:03:11	4
Inna Ryzhykh	Women	2:06:34	19
Oleksandra Stepanenko	Women	2:08:33	26

== Volleyball ==
Ukraine was represented in beach volleyball competitions only.

Athletes	Event	Group stage				Round of 24	Round of 16	Quarterfinals	Semifinals	Final	Rank
Athletes	Event	Opposition Score	Opposition Score	Opposition Score	Rank	Opposition Score	Opposition Score	Opposition Score	Opposition Score	Opposition Score	Rank
Oleksii Denin; Oleh Plotnytskyi	Men's tournament	Kosiak – Rudoł (POL); L 0–2 (12–21, 12–21)	Tomás – Menéndez (ESP); W 2–1 (18–21, 21–16, 16–14)	Kissling – Strasser (SUI); L 0–2 (16–21, 15–21)	3 q	Santos – Rudykh (AZE); L 1–2 (15–21, 22–20, 12–15)	Did not advance				
Iaroslav Gordieiev; Vladyslav Iemelianchyk	Men's tournament	P. Ingrosso – M. Ingrosso (ITA); L 0–2 (19–21, 15–21)	Kotsilianos – Zoupanis (GRE); L 1–2 (21–17, 20–22, 7–15)	Solovejs – Sorokins (LAT); L 1–2 (15–21, 21–18, 12–15)	4	Did not advance					
Darya Udovenko; Elizaveta Sulima	Women's tournament	Řeháčková – Gálová (CZE); L 0–2 (12–21, 19–21)	Ferreira – Karimova (AZE); L 0–2 (17–21, 16–21)	Kociołek – Strąg (POL); W 2–1 (21–18, 19–21, 16–14)	3 q	Ozoliņa – Graudiņa (LAT); L 0–2 (16–21, 16–21)	Did not advance				
Iryna Makhno; Inna Makhno	Women's tournament	Gruszczyńska – Baran (POL); L 1–2 (16–21, 21–17, 13–15)	Prokopeva – Syrtseva (RUS); L 0–2 (13–21, 14–21)	Longuet – Adelin (FRA); L 1–2 (21–18, 22–24, 10–15)	4	Did not advance					

== Water polo ==
Ukraine qualified a boys' team through 2015 European Games Qualification Tournament A in Nijverdal by finishing second behind Greece. Ukraine ranked 15th with only one victory against Malta.

=== Men ===
Team roster

- Kostiantyn Daviskiba
- Stanislav Dubelir
- Vladyslav Dulin
- Bohdan Dzyadyk
- Vladyslav Haliasovsky
- Denys Husakov
- Hryhoriy Kirochkin
- Mykola Leshchenko
- Vladyslav Muzhychuk
- Volodymyr Nechytailo
- Yuriy Panas
- Sava Popyk
- Pavlo Zimariov

Preliminary round — Group A

Pos	Team	Pld	W	D	L	GF	GA	GD	Pts	Qualification
1	Italy	3	3	0	0	39	19	+20	9	Quarterfinals
2	Russia	3	2	0	1	42	22	+20	6	Playoffs
3	France	3	1	0	2	23	29	−6	3	Playoffs
4	Ukraine	3	0	0	3	16	50	−34	0	13–16th place semifinals

Source: Baku 2015

13 June 2015; 15:00	Report	Russia	20–7	Ukraine	Water Polo Arena, Baku; Referees: Miodrag Stefanović (SRB); Matan Schwartz (ISR)
13 June 2015; 15:00	Report	Score by quarters: 5–0, 2–2, 6–3, 7–2			Water Polo Arena, Baku; Referees: Miodrag Stefanović (SRB); Matan Schwartz (ISR)
13 June 2015; 15:00	Report	Krug 5	Goals	Dzyadyk, Leshchenko 2	Water Polo Arena, Baku; Referees: Miodrag Stefanović (SRB); Matan Schwartz (ISR)

14 June 2015; 09:30	Report	Ukraine	3–12	France	Water Polo Arena, Baku; Referees: Marcela Mauss (GER); Massimo Angileri (MLT)
14 June 2015; 09:30	Report	Score by quarters: 0–2, 1–4, 1–5, 1–1			Water Polo Arena, Baku; Referees: Marcela Mauss (GER); Massimo Angileri (MLT)
14 June 2015; 09:30	Report	Dzyadyk, Dubelir, Dulin 1	Goals	Chandieu 3	Water Polo Arena, Baku; Referees: Marcela Mauss (GER); Massimo Angileri (MLT)

15 June 2015; 13:00	Report	Italy	18–6	Ukraine	Water Polo Arena, Baku; Referees: Brian Littlejohn (GBR); Martina Kunikova (SVK)
15 June 2015; 13:00	Report	Score by quarters: 4–0, 6–2, 4–3, 4–1			Water Polo Arena, Baku; Referees: Brian Littlejohn (GBR); Martina Kunikova (SVK)
15 June 2015; 13:00	Report	del Basso 4	Goals	Dulin, Leshchenko 2	Water Polo Arena, Baku; Referees: Brian Littlejohn (GBR); Martina Kunikova (SVK)

13–16th place semifinals

16 June 2015; 10:30	Report	Ukraine	9–11	Turkey	Water Polo Arena, Baku; Referees: Andrej Laginja (SLO); Christian Landmann (GER)
16 June 2015; 10:30	Report	Score by quarters: 1–5, 2–1, 1–3, 5–2			Water Polo Arena, Baku; Referees: Andrej Laginja (SLO); Christian Landmann (GER)
16 June 2015; 10:30	Report	Dzyadyk 4	Goals	Yalcin 3	Water Polo Arena, Baku; Referees: Andrej Laginja (SLO); Christian Landmann (GER)

15th place game

17 June 2015; 14:15	Report	Ukraine	13–8	Malta	Water Polo Arena, Baku; Referees: Raul Torres (ESP); Christian Landmann (GER)
17 June 2015; 14:15	Report	Score by quarters: 3–2, 3–2, 4–2, 3–2			Water Polo Arena, Baku; Referees: Raul Torres (ESP); Christian Landmann (GER)
17 June 2015; 14:15	Report	Popyk, Dzyadyk 5	Goals	Plumpton 5	Water Polo Arena, Baku; Referees: Raul Torres (ESP); Christian Landmann (GER)

== Wrestling ==
Ukraine was represented in all events.

Men's freestyle

Athlete	Category	Round of 32	Round of 16	Quarterfinals	Semifinals/Repechage	Final/Bronze medal bout	
Athlete	Category	Opposition Result	Opposition Result	Opposition Result	Opposition Result	Opposition Result	Rank
Taras Markovych	57 kg	Bye	Lebedev (RUS); L 0–10	Did not advance	Akgül (TUR); L 7–7	Did not advance	7
Vasyl Shuptar	61 kg	—N/a	Lomtadze (GEO); L 1–12	Did not advance	Guidea (ROU); W 6–2	Velikov (BUL); W 11–0	3rd place, bronze medalist(s)
Andriy Kvyatkovskyy	65 kg	Nurykau (BLR); L 2–3	Did not advance				
Oleksiy Melnyk	70 kg	Bye	Poliak (ISR); W 10–0	Tlashadze (GEO); L 1–4	Did not advance		
Rustam Dudaieva	74 kg	Kvelashvili (GEO); L 2–9	Did not advance				
Dmytro Rochniak	86 kg	Kaufmehl (GER); W 11–4	Aminashvili (GEO); L 1–8	Did not advance			
Valeriy Andriytsev	97 kg	Bye	Tsikovani (GRE); W 10–3	Bölükbaşı (TUR); W 5–1	Odikadze (GEO); L 3–4	Jaloviar (SVK); W 10–0	3rd place, bronze medalist(s)
Oleksandr Khotsianivskyi	125 kg	Bye	Xxx (GBR); W 10–0	Petriashvili (GEO); L 0–10	Did not advance		

Greco-Roman

Athlete	Category	Round of 32	Round of 16	Quarterfinals (/Repechage)	Semifinals/Repechage	Final/Bronze medal bout	
Athlete	Category	Opposition Result	Opposition Result	Opposition Result	Opposition Result	Opposition Result	Rank
Dmytro Kosenok	59 kg	Daurov (BLR); L 0–8	Did not advance	Belmadani (FRA); L 0–8	Did not advance		
Denys Dem'yankov	66 kg	Välimäki (FIN); W 4–3	Jäger (HUN); W 4–3	Maasch (GER); W 4–0	Surkov (RUS); L 0–2	Lévai (SVK); L 4–6	5
Mykola Savchenko	71 kg	Bye	Rutkowski (POL); W 8–0	Kostadinov (BUL); L 1–2	Did not advance		
Dmytro Pyshkov	75 kg	Manouilidis (GRE); W 8–0	Žugaj (CRO); W 6–5	Madsen (DEN); W 9–5	Nemeš (SRB); L 2–5	Eisele (GER); W 6–2	3rd place, bronze medalist(s)
Oleksandr Shyshman	80 kg	Bye	Saleev (RUS); L 0–4	Did not advance	Matuzevičius (LTU); W 9–8	Sasunouski (BLR); L 0–6	5
Zhan Beleniuk	85 kg	Franjković (SRB); W 8–0	Tamas (ROU); W 7–0	Başar (TUR); W 3–1	Manukyan (ARM); W 12–4	Magomedov (RUS); L 0–4	2nd place, silver medalist(s)
Dimitiry Timchenko	98 kg	Bye	Kesidis (GRE); W 5–0	Noumonvi (FRA); W 5–0	Dzeinichenka (BLR); W 5–5	Chakvetadze (RUS); L 2–3	2nd place, silver medalist(s)
Mykola Kuchmii	130 kg	—N/a	Shariati (AZE); L 0–8	Did not advance	Kajaia (GEO); L 4–7	Did not advance	7

Women's freestyle

Athlete	Category	Round of 32	Round of 16	Quarterfinals	Semifinals/Repechage	Final/Bronze medal bout	
Athlete	Category	Opposition Result	Opposition Result	Opposition Result	Opposition Result	Opposition Result	Rank
Oleksandra Kogut	48 kg	Rattigan (GBR); W 14–4	Schellin (GER); L 2–3	Did not advance			
Liliya Horishna	53 kg	Bye	Guerreiro (POR); W 4–1	Zasina (POL); L 0–4	Tokar (SUI); W 10–0	Shushko (BLR); L 0–4	5
Tetyana Kit	55 kg	—N/a	Pricob (ROU); W 10–2	Mattsson (SWE); L 0–8	Mertens (GER); W 10–0	Synyshyn (AZE); L 0–10	5
Tetyana Lavrenchuk	58 kg	—N/a	Bye	Huchok (BLR); W 14–12	Yeşilırmak (TUR); W 3F–4	Barka (HUN); L 2–3	2nd place, silver medalist(s)
Oksana Herhel	60 kg	—N/a	Bye	Mattsson (SWE); W 3–2	Sastin (HUN); L 2–13	Yusein (BUL); L 4–5	5
Yuliya Tkach	63 kg	—N/a	Simon (ROU); W 10–0	Michalik (POL); W 3–0	Mamashuk (BLR); W 6–0	Lazinskaya (RUS); L 4–5	2nd place, silver medalist(s)
Alina Stadnik	69 kg	—N/a	Manolova (BUL); W 8–0	Kuenz (AUT); W 6–2	Focken (GER); W 4–1	Kratysh (ISR); W 7–3	1st place, gold medalist(s)
Oksana Vashchuk	75 kg	—N/a	Zutova (AZE); W 4–2	Adar (TUR); L 0–4	Did not advance		
