= Fencing at the 2015 European Games – Women's sabre =

Women's sabre at the 2015 European Games
- Venue: Crystal Hall 3
- Date: 25 June
- Competitors: 36 from 18 nations

Medalists
gold medal	Angelika Wątor	Poland
silver medal	Sevil Bunyatova	Azerbaijan
bronze medal	Sevinc Bunyatova	Azerbaijan
bronze medal	Margaux Rifkiss	France

The women's sabre competition at the 2015 European Games in Baku was held on 25 June at the Crystal Hall 3.

== Schedule ==
All times are local (UTC+5).

Date	Time	Event
Thursday, 25 June 2015	11:50	Preliminaries
Thursday, 25 June 2015	14:20	Round of 32
Thursday, 25 June 2015	15:30	Round of 16
Thursday, 25 June 2015	16:20	Quarterfinals
Thursday, 25 June 2015	19:00	Semifinals
Thursday, 25 June 2015	20:00	Final

== Results ==
=== Preliminaries ===
==== Pool A ====
Seed	Athlete	(Azerbaijan)	(France)	(Italy)	(Poland)	(Ukraine)	(Turkey)	V	B	V/B	HS	HR	Diff.	RP	RT
	Sevinc Bunyatova (AZE)		V	V	V	V	V	5	5	1.000	25	10	15	1	2
	Marion Stoltz (FRA)	3		2	V	V	V	3	5	0.600	20	16	4	2	13
	Rebecca Gargano (ITA)	0	V		V	0	V	3	5	0.600	15	17	–2	3	18
	Martyna Wątora (POL)	2	0	4		V	V	2	5	0.400	16	20	–4	4	27
	Olha Kharlan (UKR)	3	4	V	3		3	1	5	0.200	18	20	–2	5	29
	Ilgın Sarban (TUR)	2	2	1	2	V		1	5	0.200	12	23	–11	6	31

==== Pool B ====
Seed	Athlete	(Greece)	(France)	(Italy)	(Poland)	(Moldova)	(Czech Republic)	V	B	V/B	HS	HR	Diff.	RP	RT
	Vassiliki Vougiouka (GRE)		V	V	V	V	V	5	5	1.000	25	8	17	1	1
	Flora Palu (FRA)	1		V	V	V	V	4	5	0.800	21	13	8	2	5
	Martina Criscio (ITA)	3	4		V	V	V	3	5	0.600	22	13	9	3	10
	Magdalena Pasternak (POL)	1	2	1		V	V	2	5	0.400	14	16	–2	4	25
	Aliona Jelachi (MDA)	1	2	2	1		V	1	5	0.200	11	24	–13	5	33
	Klára Hanžlíková (CZE)	2	0	0	0	4		0	5	0.000	6	25	–19	6	=35

==== Pool C ====
Seed	Athlete	(Germany)	(Poland)	(Russia)	(Ukraine)	(France)	(Georgia (country))	V	B	V/B	HS	HR	Diff.	RP	RT
	Anna Limbach (GER)		V	V	V	3	V	4	5	0.800	23	17	6	1	7
	Angelika Wątor (POL)	3		3	V	V	V	3	5	0.600	21	15	6	2	11
	Yana Obvintseva (RUS)	3	V		V	3	V	3	5	0.600	21	18	3	3	14
	Alina Komashchuk (UKR)	3	3	2		V	V	2	5	0.400	18	18	0	4	23
	Margaux Rifkiss (FRA)	V	1	V	2		0	2	5	0.400	13	21	–8	5	28
	Teodora Kakhiani (GEO)	3	1	3	1	V		1	5	0.200	13	20	–7	6	30

==== Pool D ====
Seed	Athlete	(Ukraine)	(Russia)	(Azerbaijan)	(Italy)	(France)	(Iceland)	V	B	V/B	HS	HR	Diff.	RP	RT
	Olena Kravatska (UKR)		2	V	V	V	V	4	5	0.800	22	13	9	1	4
	Mariya Ridel (RUS)	V		4	4	V	V	3	5	0.600	23	14	9	2	9
	Fatima Ibrahimova (AZE)	1	V		V	2	V	3	5	0.600	18	16	2	3	15
	Caterina Navarria (ITA)	3	V	1		V	V	3	5	0.600	19	18	1	4	16
	Sara Balzer (FRA)	3	1	V	3		V	2	5	0.400	17	19	–2	5	24
	Thorbjörg Ágústsdóttir (ISL)	1	1	1	1	2		0	5	0.000	6	25	–19	6	=35

==== Pool E ====
Seed	Athlete	(Azerbaijan)	(Spain)	(Russia)	(Belarus)	(Italy)	(Poland)	V	B	V/B	HS	HR	Diff.	RP	RT
	Sabina Mikina (AZE)		V	V	V	V	V	5	5	1.000	25	12	13	1	3
	Laia Vila (ESP)	1		V	2	V	V	3	5	0.600	18	17	1	2	17
	Tatiana Sukhova (RUS)	2	2		V	4	V	2	5	0.400	18	17	1	3	20
	Darya Andreyeva (BLR)	3	V	2		4	V	2	5	0.400	19	19	0	4	22
	Sofia Ciaraglia (ITA)	4	4	V	V		2	2	5	0.400	20	23	–3	5	26
	Karolina Kaleta (POL)	2	1	0	2	V		1	5	0.200	10	22	–12	6	32

==== Pool F ====
Seed	Athlete	(United Kingdom)	(Azerbaijan)	(Russia)	(Romania)	(Ukraine)	(Belgium)	V	B	V/B	HS	HR	Diff.	RP	RT
	Aliya Itzkowitz (GBR)		3	V	V	V	V	4	5	0.800	23	16	7	1	6
	Sevil Bunyatova (AZE)	V		V	1	V	V	4	5	0.800	21	19	2	2	8
	Viktoriya Kovaleva (RUS)	3	4		V	V	V	3	5	0.600	22	17	5	3	12
	Bianca Pascu (ROU)	4	V	2		3	V	2	5	0.400	19	18	1	4	19
	Olha Zhovnir (UKR)	2	4	4	V		V	2	5	0.400	20	20	0	5	21
	Alexandra Gevaert (BEL)	2	3	1	2	2		0	5	0.000	10	25	–15	6	34

=== Knockout round ===
==== Final ====
Final
8	Sevil Bunyatova (AZE)	14
11	Angelika Wątor (POL)	15

==== Top half ====
Round of 32
17	Laia Vila (ESP)	15
16	Caterina Navarria (ITA)	11
9	Mariya Ridel (RUS)	15
24	Sara Balzer (FRA)	10
25	Magdalena Pasternak (POL)	4
8	Sevil Bunyatova (AZE)	15
5	Flora Palu (FRA)	12
28	Margaux Rifkiss (FRA)	15
21	Olha Zhovnir (UKR)	15
12	Viktoriya Kovaleva (RUS)	14
13	Marion Stoltz (FRA)	14
20	Tatiana Sukhova (RUS)	15

Round of 16
1	Vassiliki Vougiouka (GRE)	15
17	Laia Vila (ESP)	8
9	Mariya Ridel (RUS)	9
8	Sevil Bunyatova (AZE)	15
28	Margaux Rifkiss (FRA)	15
21	Olha Zhovnir (UKR)	12
20	Tatiana Sukhova (RUS)	13
4	Olena Kravatska (UKR)	15

Quarterfinals
1	Vassiliki Vougiouka (GRE)	12
8	Sevil Bunyatova (AZE)	15
28	Margaux Rifkiss (FRA)	15
4	Olena Kravatska (UKR)	10

Semifinals
8	Sevil Bunyatova (AZE)	15
28	Margaux Rifkiss (FRA)	9

==== Bottom half ====
Round of 32
19	Bianca Pascu (ROU)	11
14	Yana Obvintseva (RUS)	15
11	Angelika Wątor (POL)	15
22	Darya Andreyeva (BLR)	9
27	Martyna Wątora (POL)	15
6	Aliya Itzkowitz (GBR)	12
7	Anna Limbach (GER)	15
26	Sofia Ciaraglia (ITA)	11
23	Alina Komashchuk (UKR)	15
10	Martina Criscio (ITA)	7
15	Fatima Ibrahimova (AZE)	7
18	Rebecca Gargano (ITA)	15

Round of 16
3	Sabina Mikina (AZE)	13
14	Yana Obvintseva (RUS)	15
11	Angelika Wątor (POL)	15
27	Martyna Wątora (POL)	7
7	Anna Limbach (GER)	8
23	Alina Komashchuk (UKR)	15
18	Rebecca Gargano (ITA)	7
2	Sevinc Bunyatova (AZE)	15

Quarterfinals
14	Yana Obvintseva (RUS)	10
11	Angelika Wątor (POL)	15
23	Alina Komashchuk (UKR)	11
2	Sevinc Bunyatova (AZE)	15

Semifinals
11	Angelika Wątor (POL)	15
2	Sevinc Bunyatova (AZE)	11
