= Swimming at the 2015 European Games – Men's 50 metre butterfly =

Men's 50 metre butterfly at the 2015 European Games
- Venue: Aquatic Palace
- Dates: 23 June
- Competitors: 61 from 30 nations
- Winning time: 23.92

Medalists
gold medal	Andriy Khloptsov	Ukraine
silver medal	Paweł Sendyk	Poland
bronze medal	Daniil Pakhomov	Russia

The men's 50 metre butterfly event at the 2015 European Games in Baku took place on 23 June at the Aquatic Palace.

== Results ==
=== Heats ===
The heats were started at 09:38.

Rank	Heat	Lane	Name	Nationality	Time	Notes
1	7	6	Roman Shevliakov	Russia	24.10	Q, GR
2	5	2	Bruno Blašković	Croatia	24.13	Q
3	6	3	Daniil Pakhomov	Russia	24.20	Q
4	7	4	Vladislav Kozlov	Russia	24.23	
5	7	3	Andriy Khloptsov	Ukraine	24.29	Q
6	7	2	Sergii Shevtsov	Ukraine	24.35	Q
7	5	4	Michał Chudy	Poland	24.36	Q
8	7	5	Paweł Sendyk	Poland	24.38	Q
9	5	6	Alberto Lozano	Spain	24.48	Q
10	5	5	Daniel Zaitsev	Estonia	24.49	Q
11	6	7	Meiron Cheruti	Israel	24.59	Q
12	5	3	Dmytro Prozhoha	Ukraine	24.61	
12	6	6	Niko Mäkelä	Finland	24.61	Q
14	5	1	Marius Solaat Rødland	Norway	24.62	Q
15	5	7	Artūrs Pesockis	Latvia	24.64	Q
15	6	8	Emre Sakçı	Turkey	24.64	Q, WD
17	7	7	Kirill Baron	Israel	24.68	Q
18	5	8	Dries Vangoetsenhoven	Belgium	24.70	Q
19	3	9	Filip Milcevic	Austria	24.73	Q
20	6	5	Andrea Vergani	Italy	24.74	
21	6	2	Johannes Tesch	Germany	24.95	
21	6	1	Michał Brzuś	Poland	24.95	
23	6	4	Mikhail Vekovishchev	Russia	25.02	
24	6	9	Berk Özkul	Turkey	25.03	
25	5	9	Adi Mešetović	Bosnia and Herzegovina	25.10	
26	4	6	Thomas Fannon	Great Britain	25.12	
27	4	8	Ivan Andrianov	Azerbaijan	25.14	
27	7	9	Sigurd Holten Bøen	Norway	25.14	
29	4	5	Vladimír Štefánik	Slovakia	25.15	
30	7	1	Paulus Schön	Germany	25.16	
31	3	7	Nikola Miljenić	Croatia	25.19	
32	4	7	Luke Greenbank	Great Britain	25.20	
33	5	0	Nikita Saunonen	Finland	25.29	
34	7	8	Thomas Maurer	Switzerland	25.34	
35	4	3	Grigori Pekarski	Belarus	25.36	
36	4	2	Christian Ferraro	Italy	25.40	
37	1	3	Akaki Vashakidze	Georgia	25.45	
37	6	0	Damian Chrzanowski	Poland	25.45	
39	4	4	Cevin Siim	Estonia	25.49	
40	1	4	Dániel Sós	Hungary	25.67	
41	3	5	Teodor Widerberg	Sweden	25.70	
42	3	1	Alexander Lohmar	Germany	25.72	
43	2	2	Benjamin Doyle	Ireland	25.77	
44	4	9	Matija Pucarević	Serbia	25.83	
45	7	0	Enzo Nardozza	Italy	25.87	
46	4	1	James Brown	Ireland	25.88	
47	2	8	Adrian Negru	Moldova	25.90	
48	3	3	Márk Tekauer	Hungary	25.92	
49	3	0	Henry Kerman	Sweden	25.93	
50	3	4	Timothy Schlatter	Switzerland	25.94	
51	1	5	Maid Sukanović	Bosnia and Herzegovina	25.98	
52	3	2	Blaž Demšar	Slovenia	25.99	
53	2	4	Samet Alkan	Turkey	26.03	
53	2	7	Juho Grönblom	Finland	26.03	
55	3	6	Manuel Leuthard	Switzerland	26.09	
56	2	3	Ljupcho Angelovski	Macedonia	26.38	
57	4	0	Ole-Mikal Fløgstad	Norway	26.42	
58	3	8	Takis Papadopoulos	Cyprus	26.47	
59	2	6	Vlas Cononov	Moldova	26.67	
60	2	1	Kamran Jafarov	Azerbaijan	27.17	
61	2	5	Murat Ayhan	Azerbaijan	28.75	

=== Semifinals ===
The semifinals were started at 17:37.

==== Semifinal 1 ====
Rank	Lane	Name	Nationality	Time	Notes
1	5	Andriy Khloptsov	Ukraine	23.90	Q, GR
2	4	Bruno Blašković	Croatia	23.95	Q
3	3	Michał Chudy	Poland	23.98	q
4	6	Alberto Lozano	Spain	24.18	q
5	7	Marius Solaat Rødland	Norway	24.51	
6	2	Meiron Cheruti	Israel	24.53	
7	8	Dries Vangoetsenhoven	Belgium	24.73	
8	1	Filip Milcevic	Austria	24.74	

==== Semifinal 2 ====
Rank	Lane	Name	Nationality	Time	Notes
1	5	Daniil Pakhomov	Russia	24.07	Q
2	4	Roman Shevliakov	Russia	24.11	Q
3	6	Paweł Sendyk	Poland	24.19	q
4	1	Artūrs Pesockis	Latvia	24.37	q
5	8	Kirill Baron	Israel	24.39	
6	2	Daniel Zaitsev	Estonia	24.43	
7	7	Niko Mäkelä	Finland	24.43	
8	3	Sergii Shevtsov	Ukraine	24.54	

=== Final ===
The final was held at 19:04.

Rank	Lane	Name	Nationality	Time	Notes
1st place, gold medalist(s)	4	Andriy Khloptsov	Ukraine	23.92	
2nd place, silver medalist(s)	1	Paweł Sendyk	Poland	23.97	
3rd place, bronze medalist(s)	6	Daniil Pakhomov	Russia	24.02	
4	2	Roman Shevliakov	Russia	24.05	
5	3	Michał Chudy	Poland	24.06	
6	5	Bruno Blašković	Croatia	24.10	
7	7	Alberto Lozano	Spain	24.17	
8	8	Artūrs Pesockis	Latvia	24.46	
