= Swimming at the 2015 European Games – Men's 50 metre backstroke =

Men's 50 metre backstroke at the 2015 European Games
- Venue: Aquatic Palace
- Dates: 26 June
- Competitors: 42 from 27 nations
- Winning time: 25.40

Medalists
gold medal	Filipp Shopin	Russia
silver medal	Marek Ulrich	Germany
bronze medal	Andriy Khloptsov	Ukraine

The men's 100 metre backstroke event at the 2015 European Games in Baku took place on 26 June at the Aquatic Palace.

== Results ==
=== Heats ===
The heats were started at 09:41.

Rank	Heat	Lane	Name	Nationality	Time	Notes
1	4	4	Robert Glință	Romania	25.78	Q, GR
2	5	5	Filipp Shopin	Russia	25.79	Q
3	3	4	Marek Ulrich	Germany	25.80	Q
4	4	5	Andriy Khloptsov	Ukraine	26.02	Q
5	4	2	Ole Braunschweig	Germany	26.20	Q
6	3	3	Nikolaos Sofianidis	Greece	26.26	Q
6	4	7	Javier Romero	Spain	26.26	Q
8	4	3	Bence Szucsik	Hungary	26.27	Q, WD
9	5	6	Mikita Tsmyh	Belarus	26.31	Q
10	4	1	Tomáš Franta	Czech Republic	26.37	Q
11	3	5	Roman Larin	Russia	26.39	Q, WD
12	5	2	Petter Fredriksson	Sweden	26.50	Q
13	5	4	Marek Osina	Czech Republic	26.54	Q
14	3	2	Kristian Komlenić	Croatia	26.55	Q
15	4	6	Kirill Titov	Russia	26.60	
16	2	5	Andrei Gussev	Estonia	26.65	Q
17	3	6	Cristiano Hantjoglu	Italy	26.67	Q
18	5	3	Lorenzo Mora	Italy	26.70	Q
19	3	0	Gabriel Lópes	Portugal	26.80	Q
20	3	1	Franz Müller	Germany	26.83	
20	4	8	Dawid Murzyn	Poland	26.83	
22	2	9	Daniel Aizenberg	Israel	26.88	
23	3	8	Idan Dotan	Israel	26.89	
24	5	1	Lorenzo Glessi	Italy	27.01	
25	5	8	Berk Özkul	Turkey	27.12	
26	5	7	Timothy Schlatter	Switzerland	27.31	
27	4	9	Rory McEvoy	Ireland	27.34	
28	2	4	Alan Corby	Ireland	27.43	
29	4	0	Rasim Oğulcan Gör	Turkey	27.47	
30	2	6	Bruno Blašković	Croatia	27.52	
31	5	0	Dmytro Prozhoha	Ukraine	27.56	
32	2	2	Alexander Světlík	Slovakia	27.58	
33	2	3	Max Mannes	Luxembourg	27.60	
34	3	9	Michał Brzuś	Poland	27.66	
35	2	4	Moritz Walaschewski	Germany	27.81	
36	2	1	Qriqoriy Kalminskiy	Azerbaijan	27.89	
37	1	5	Bragi Snær Hallsson	Iceland	27.91	
37	5	9	Daniel Kaplan	Israel	27.91	
39	1	4	Ljupcho Angelovski	Macedonia	28.15	
40	1	3	Adrian Negru	Moldova	28.17	
41	2	8	Vito Vodenik	Slovenia	28.25	
42	2	0	Tarik Hoch	Liechtenstein	29.86	
	3	7	Joe Hulme	Great Britain	DNS	

=== Semifinals ===
The semifinals were started at 17:36.

==== Semifinal 1 ====
Rank	Lane	Name	Nationality	Time	Notes
1	4	Filipp Shopin	Russia	25.67	Q, GR
2	5	Andriy Khloptsov	Ukraine	25.84	Q
3	3	Nikolaos Sofianidis	Greece	26.03	q
4	7	Kristian Komlenić	Croatia	26.20	q
5	6	Mikita Tsmyh	Belarus	26.41	
6	2	Petter Fredriksson	Sweden	26.62	
7	1	Cristiano Hantjoglu	Italy	26.74	
8	8	Gabriel Lópes	Portugal	26.86	

==== Semifinal 2 ====
Rank	Lane	Name	Nationality	Time	Notes
1	5	Marek Ulrich	Germany	25.73	Q
2	4	Robert Glință	Romania	25.86	Q
3	6	Javier Romero	Spain	26.12	q
4	3	Ole Braunschweig	Germany	26.34	q
5	1	Andrei Gussev	Estonia	26.40	
6	2	Tomáš Franta	Czech Republic	26.57	
7	8	Lorenzo Mora	Italy	26.66	
8	7	Marek Osina	Czech Republic	26.73	

=== Final ===
The final was held at 19:33.

Rank	Lane	Name	Nationality	Time	Notes
1st place, gold medalist(s)	4	Filipp Shopin	Russia	25.40	GR
2nd place, silver medalist(s)	5	Marek Ulrich	Germany	25.44	
3rd place, bronze medalist(s)	3	Andriy Khloptsov	Ukraine	25.71	
4	6	Robert Glință	Romania	25.80	
5	2	Nikolaos Sofianidis	Greece	25.92	
6	7	Javier Romero	Spain	26.20	
7	8	Ole Braunschweig	Germany	26.34	
8	1	Kristian Komlenić	Croatia	26.47	
