= Fencing at the 2015 European Games – Women's team sabre =

Women's team sabre at the 2015 European Games
- Venue: Crystal Hall 3
- Date: 27 June
- Competitors: 24 from 6 nations

Medalists
gold medal	Olha Kharlan; Alina Komashchuk; Olena Kravatska; Olha Zhovnir	Ukraine
silver medal	Sofia Ciaraglia; Martina Criscio; Rebecca Gargano; Caterina Navarria	Italy
bronze medal	Viktoriya Kovaleva; Yana Obvintseva; Mariya Ridel; Tatiana Sukhova	Russia

The women's team sabre competition at the 2015 European Games in Baku was held on 27 June at the Crystal Hall 3.

== Results ==
Quarterfinals
Poland	17
Italy	45
Ukraine	45
Azerbaijan	24

Semifinals
France	33
Italy	45
Ukraine	45
Russia	34

Final
Italy	43
Ukraine	45
Third place
France	29
Russia	45

Fifth place
Poland	41
Azerbaijan	45

== Final standing ==
Rank	Team
1st place, gold medalist(s)	Ukraine; Olha Kharlan; Alina Komashchuk; Olena Kravatska; Olha Zhovnir
2nd place, silver medalist(s)	Italy; Sofia Ciaraglia; Martina Criscio; Rebecca Gargano; Caterina Navarria
3rd place, bronze medalist(s)	Russia; Viktoriya Kovaleva; Yana Obvintseva; Mariya Ridel; Tatiana Sukhova
4	France; Sara Balzer; Flora Palu; Margaux Rifkiss; Marion Stoltz
5	Azerbaijan; Sevil Bunyatova; Sevinc Bunyatova; Fatima Ibrahimova; Sabina Mikina
6	Poland; Karolina Kaleta; Magdalena Pasternak; Angelika Wątor; Martyna Wątora
