= Diving at the 2015 European Games – Women's 1 metre springboard =

Women's 1 metre springboard at the 2015 European Games
- Venue: Baku Aquatics Centre
- Dates: 19 June
- Competitors: 29 from 20 nations
- Winning points: 419.45

Medalists
gold medal	Maria Polyakova	Russia
silver medal	Louisa Stawczynski	Germany
bronze medal	Diana Shelestyuk	Ukraine

The women's 1 metre springboard diving competition at the 2015 European Games in Baku took place on 19 June at the Baku Aquatics Centre.

== Results ==
The preliminary round was started at 10:00. The final was held at 20:25.

Green denotes finalists

Rank	Diver	Nationality	Preliminary		Final	
Rank	Diver	Nationality	Points	Rank	Points	Rank
1st place, gold medalist(s)	Maria Polyakova	Russia	383.15	3	419.45	1
2nd place, silver medalist(s)	Louisa Stawczynski	Germany	370.60	5	392.20	2
3rd place, bronze medalist(s)	Diana Shelestyuk	Ukraine	359.70	10	388.45	3
4	Ekaterina Nekrasova	Russia	407.00	1	386.80	4
5	Josefin Schneider	Germany	371.75	4	384.95	5
6	Millie Fowler	Great Britain	393.40	2	383.20	6
7	Roosa Kanerva	Finland	356.10	11	381.15	7
8	Katherine Torrance	Great Britain	368.15	7	379.35	8
9	Vivian Barth	Switzerland	370.00	6	377.70	9
10	Kaja Skrzek	Poland	366.20	8	374.75	10
11	Daphne Wils	Netherlands	350.10	12	373.95	11
12	Frida Källgren	Sweden	365.30	9	370.30	12
13	Giulia Rogantin	Italy	349.85	13	did not advance	
14	Caroline Lecoeur	France	341.10	14	did not advance	
15	Maja Borić	Croatia	327.70	15	did not advance	
16	Indrė Girdauskaitė	Lithuania	323.60	16	did not advance	
17	Katsiaryna Velihurskaya	Belarus	321.35	17	did not advance	
18	Madeline Coquoz	Switzerland	320.10	18	did not advance	
19	Natasha MacManus	Ireland	319.70	19	did not advance	
20	Maïssam Naji	France	319.10	20	did not advance	
21	Anne Vilde Tuxen	Norway	318.25	21	did not advance	
22	Marharyta Dzhusova	Ukraine	314.25	22	did not advance	
23	Malvina Catalano Gonzaga	Italy	309.80	23	did not advance	
24	Dominika Bąk	Poland	304.20	24	did not advance	
25	Kamilla Veres	Hungary	290.80	25	did not advance	
26	Michelle Staudenherz	Austria	278.55	26	did not advance	
27	Olqa Bikovskaya	Azerbaijan	265.20	27	did not advance	
28	Daniela Aleksandravičiūtė	Lithuania	264.85	28	did not advance	
29	Annija Zagorska	Latvia	161.35	29	did not advance	
