= Gymnastics at the 2015 European Games – Women's rhythmic individual clubs =

Women's rhythmic individual clubs at the 2015 European Games
- Venue: National Gymnastics Arena
- Date: 21 June
- Competitors: 6 from 6 nations
- Winning score: 19.200

Medalists
gold medal	Yana Kudryavtseva	Russia
silver medal	Ganna Rizatdinova	Ukraine
bronze medal	Melitina Staniouta	Belarus

The women's rhythmic individual clubs competition at the 2015 European Games was held at the National Gymnastics Arena on 21 June 2015. The six best results from the All-Around Final qualified in the Final, with one gymnast allowed per country.

== Results ==
Rank	Gymnast	D Score	E Score	Pen.	Total
1st place, gold medalist(s)	Yana Kudryavtseva (RUS)	9.600	9.600		19.200
2nd place, silver medalist(s)	Ganna Rizatdinova (UKR)	9.250	9.300		18.550
3rd place, bronze medalist(s)	Melitina Staniouta (BLR)	8.950	9.200		18.150
4	Salome Pazhava (GEO)	8.950	9.150		18.100
5	Neviana Vladinova (BUL)	8.700	8.800		17.500
6	Nicol Ruprecht (AUT)	8.600	8.650		17.250
