= Diving at the 2015 European Games – Women's synchronized 3 metre springboard =

Women's synchronized 3 metre springboard at the 2015 European Games
- Venue: Baku Aquatics Centre
- Dates: 20 June
- Competitors: 20 from 10 nations
- Teams: 10
- Winning points: 284.07

Medalists
gold medal	Saskia Oettinghaus; Louisa Stawczynski	Germany
silver medal	Elena Chernykh; Maria Polyakova	Russia
bronze medal	Marharyta Dzhusova; Diana Shelestyuk	Ukraine

The men's synchronized 3 metre springboard diving competition at the 2015 European Games in Baku took place on 20 June at the Baku Aquatics Centre.

== Results ==
The final was held at 19:00.

Rank	Diver	Nationality	Points
1st place, gold medalist(s)	Saskia Oettinghaus; Louisa Stawczynski	Germany	284.07
2nd place, silver medalist(s)	Elena Chernykh; Maria Polyakova	Russia	276.90
3rd place, bronze medalist(s)	Marharyta Dzhusova; Diana Shelestyuk	Ukraine	264.87
4	Yuliya Bandzik; Krystsina Sheshka	Belarus	256.80
5	Dominika Bąk; Kaja Skrzek	Poland	237.69
6	Malvina Catalano Gonzaga; Laura Anna Granelli	Italy	235.50
7	Vivian Barth; Madeline Coquoz	Switzerland	235.38
8	Maja Borić; Lorena Tomiek	Croatia	228.15
9	Millie Fowler; Millie Haffety	Great Britain	216.45
10	Hannah Lena Rott; Michelle Staudenherz	Austria	215.55
