= Judo at the 2008 Summer Paralympics – Men's 81 kg =

Judo competition

Judo - Men's 81 kg at the XIII Paralympic Games
- Venue: Beijing Workers' Gymnasium
- Date: 8 September 2008
- Competitors: 12 from 12 nations

Medalists
1st place, gold medalist(s)		Isao Cruz	Cuba
2nd place, silver medalist(s)		Cyril Jonard	France
3rd place, bronze medalist(s)		Jorge Lencina	Argentina
3rd place, bronze medalist(s)		Reinaldo Carvallo	Venezuela

The men's 81 kg judo competition at the 2008 Summer Paralympics was held on 8 September at the Beijing Workers' Gymnasium.

This event was the median of the men's judo weight classes, limiting competitors to a maximum of 81 kilograms of body mass. Like all other judo events, bouts lasted five minutes. If the bout was still tied at the end, it was extended for another five-minute, sudden-death period; if neither judoka scored during that period, the match is decided by the judges. The tournament bracket consisted of a single-elimination contest culminating in a gold medal match. There was also a repechage to determine the winners of the two bronze medals. Each judoka who had lost to a semifinalist competed in the repechage. The two judokas who lost in the semifinals faced the winner of the opposite half of the bracket's repechage in bronze medal bouts.

== Final ranking ==
Rank	Name
Gold medal	Isao Cruz (CUB)
Silver medal	Cyril Jonard (FRA)
Bronze medal	Jorge Lencina (ARG)
Bronze medal	Reinaldo Carvallo (VEN)
5	Amir Mirhassan Nattaj (IRI)
5	Kenji Oga (JPN)
7	Oleksandr Pominov (UKR)
7	Natig Novruzzade (AZE)

== Tournament results ==
First Round
Reinaldo Carvallo (VEN)	0210
Oleksandr Pominov (UKR)	0000
Amir Mirhassan Nattaj (IRI)	0000^{1}
Cyril Jonard (FRA)	1001
Salvador Gonzalez (ESP)	0000
Natig Novruzzade (AZE)	1000
Scott Jones (USA)	0001
Kenji Oga (JPN)	0210^{1}

Quarterfinals
Matteo Ardit (ITA)	0000
Reinaldo Carvallo (VEN)	0011
Gábor Vincze (HUN)	0001
Cyril Jonard (FRA)	1100
Jorge Lencina (ARG)	1000
Natig Novruzzade (AZE)	0000
Isao Cruz (CUB)	0010
Kenji Oga (JPN)	0000^{2}

Semifinals
Reinaldo Carvallo (VEN)	0000
Cyril Jonard (FRA)	1010
Jorge Lencina (ARG)	0001
Isao Cruz (CUB)	1101^{1}

Final
Cyril Jonard (FRA)	0000
Isao Cruz (CUB)	0010

=== Repechage ===
First round
Oleksandr Pominov (UKR)	1000
Matteo Ardit (ITA)	0000
Amir Mirhassan Nattaj (IRI)	0002
Gábor Vincze (HUN)	0000^{1}
Natig Novruzzade (AZE)
Bye
Kenji Oga (JPN)
Bye

Second round
Oleksandr Pominov (UKR)	0001^{3}
Amir Mirhassan Nattaj (IRI)	0101^{1}
Natig Novruzzade (AZE)	Fusen-Gachi (forfeit)
Kenji Oga (JPN)

Bronze medal finals
Amir Mirhassan Nattaj (IRI)	0001^{1}
Jorge Lencina (ARG)	0011^{1}
Kenji Oga (JPN)	0000
Reinaldo Carvallo (VEN)	1010
