= Jorge Lencina =

Argentinian Olympic judoka

Personal information
- Born: March 26, 1976 (age 50) Córdoba, Argentina
- Occupation: Judoka

Sport
- Sport: Judo
Medal record
Men's judo
Representing Argentina
Pan American Games
Bronze medal – third place	1995 Mar del Plata	Bantamweight
Bronze medal – third place	1999 Winnipeg	Extra-Lightweight
Paralympic Games
Bronze medal – third place	2008 Beijing	-81kg
Bronze medal – third place	2012 London	90 kg
Parapan American Games
Gold medal – first place	2015 Toronto	-90kg
Bronze medal – third place	2011 Guadalajara	-90kg

Profile at external databases
- JudoInside.com: 1859

Jorge Daniel Lencina (born March 26, 1976, in Córdoba) is a retired male judoka from Argentina. He claimed the bronze medal in the Men's Bantamweight (– 60 kg) division at the 1995 Pan American Games in Mar del Plata. Lencina represented his native country in three consecutive Summer Olympics, starting in 1996. He competed in the Paralympic Games in 2008 and 2012.
