= Fencing at the 2023 European Games – Women's team sabre =

Event at the 2023 European games

Women's team sabre at the 2023 European Games
- Venue: Tauron Arena Kraków
- Location: Kraków, Poland
- Date: 30 June
- Competitors: 44 from 12 nations
- Teams: 12

Medalists
gold medal	Manon Apithy-Brunet; Sara Balzer; Cécilia Berder; Margaux Rifkiss	France
silver medal	Martina Criscio; Rossella Gregorio; Chiara Mormile; Eloisa Passaro	Italy
bronze medal	Sugár Katinka Battai; Renáta Katona; Liza Pusztai; Luca Szűcs	Hungary

The women's team sabre competition at the 2023 European Games in Kraków was held on 30 June 2023.

== Results ==
=== Main bracket ===
Round of 16
Poland	42
Germany	45
Bulgaria	45
Turkey	24
Romania	42
Azerbaijan	45
Ukraine	35
Greece	45

Quarterfinals
France	45
Germany	29
Bulgaria	45
Spain	44
Italy	45
Azerbaijan	42
Greece	30
Hungary	45

Semifinals
France	45
Bulgaria	35
Italy	45
Hungary	40

Final
France	45
Italy	38
Third place
Bulgaria	40
Hungary	45

=== 5–8th place bracket ===
5–8th place semifinals
Germany	43
Spain	45
Azerbaijan	45
Greece	29

Fifth place
Spain	45
Azerbaijan	42
Seventh place
Germany	43
Greece	45

=== 9–12th place bracket ===
9–12th place semifinals
Poland	45
Turkey	36
Romania	30
Ukraine	45

Ninth place
Poland	42
Ukraine	45
Eleventh place
Turkey	45
Romania	40

== Final ranking ==
Rank	Team	Rank	Team	Rank	Team
1st place, gold medalist(s)	France; Manon Apithy-Brunet; Sara Balzer; Cécilia Berder; Margaux Rifkiss	5	Spain; Elena Hernández; Lucía Martín-Portugués; Araceli Navarro; Celia Pérez	9	Ukraine; Yuliya Bakastova; Olha Kharlan; Alina Komashchuk; Olena Kravatska
2nd place, silver medalist(s)	Italy; Martina Criscio; Rossella Gregorio; Chiara Mormile; Eloisa Passaro	6	Azerbaijan; Anna Bashta; Valeriya Bolshakova; Sabina Karimova; Palina Kaspiarovich	10	Poland; Zuzanna Cieślar; Małgorzata Kozaczuk; Sylwia Matuszak; Angelika Wątor
3rd place, bronze medalist(s)	Hungary; Sugár Katinka Battai; Renáta Katona; Liza Pusztai; Luca Szűcs	7	Greece; Despina Georgiadou; Theodora Gkountoura; Klairi Mpenou; Marina Paizi	11	Turkey; Begüm Alkaya; Nisanur Erbil; Nil Güngör; Iryna Shchukla
4	Bulgaria; Olga Hramova; Yoana Ilieva; Beloslava Ivanova; Emma Neikova	8	Germany; Larissa Eifler; Julika Funke; Elisabeth Gette; Felice Herbon	12	Romania; Tania Luțea; Sabina Martiș; Maria Matei; Ilinca Pantiș
