= Judo at the 2015 European Games – Men's blind +90 kg =

Men's blind +90 kg at the 2015 European Games
- Venue: Heydar Aliyev Arena
- Date: 26 June
- Competitors: 7 from 6 nations

Medalists
gold medal	Ilham Zakiyev	Azerbaijan
silver medal	Oleksandr Pominov	Ukraine
bronze medal	Aleksandr Parasiuk	Russia
bronze medal	Zakir Mislimov	Azerbaijan

The men's +90 kg blind judo event at the 2015 European Games in Baku was held on 26 June at the Heydar Aliyev Arena.

== Results ==
Quarterfinals
Dursun Hayran (TUR)	000
Klimis Papachristos (GRE)	100
Aleksandr Parasiuk (RUS)	100
Julien Taurines (FRA)	000
Oleksandr Pominov (UKR)	100
Zakir Mislimov (AZE)	000

Semifinals
Ilham Zakiyev (AZE)	100
Klimis Papachristos (GRE)	000
Aleksandr Parasiuk (RUS)	000
Oleksandr Pominov (UKR)	100

Final
Ilham Zakiyev (AZE)	100
Oleksandr Pominov (UKR)	000

Repechage

Repechage

Third place
Dursun Hayran (TUR)	000
Aleksandr Parasiuk (RUS)	101

Repechage
Julien Taurines (FRA)	000
Zakir Mislimov (AZE)	101

Third place
Zakir Mislimov (AZE)	100
Klimis Papachristos (GRE)	000
