= Oleksandr Pominov =

Ukrainian male visually impaired judoka

Personal information
- Born: 22 July 1976 (age 49) Rivne
- Occupation: Judoka

Sport
- Country: Ukraine
- Sport: Judo
- Weight class: Visually impaired +90 kg
Medal record
Men's judo
Representing Ukraine
European Games
Silver medal – second place	2015 Baku	Visually impaired +90 kg
- Updated on 22 July 2022

Oleksandr Pominov (born 22 July 1976 in Rivne) is a Ukrainian Paralympic judoka. He is a silver medalist of the 2015 European Games.

At the 2004 Summer Paralympics, Pominov lost in the quarterfinals to Gábor Vincze from Hungary, but he qualified for the reprechage rounds where he won against Diego Poli from Italy, but lost to Sebastian Junk from Germany and ranked 7th. At the next Paralympics, he lost to Reinaldo Carvallo from Venezuela in the round of 16, won against Matteo Ardit from Italy in the first repechage round and lost to Amir Mirhassan Nattaj from Iran in the second repechage round, thus placing 7th. Pominov was not successful at the 2012 Paralympics where he lost to the eventual champion Jorge Hierrezuelo Marcillis from Cuba in the round of 16 and to Ganbat Dashtseren from Mongolia in the first round of the repechage contest. At the 2016 Summer Paralympics, Pominov lost in the round of 16 to Kanan Abdullakhanli from Azerbaijan.
