= Inna Ryzhykh =

Ukrainian triathlete (born 1985)

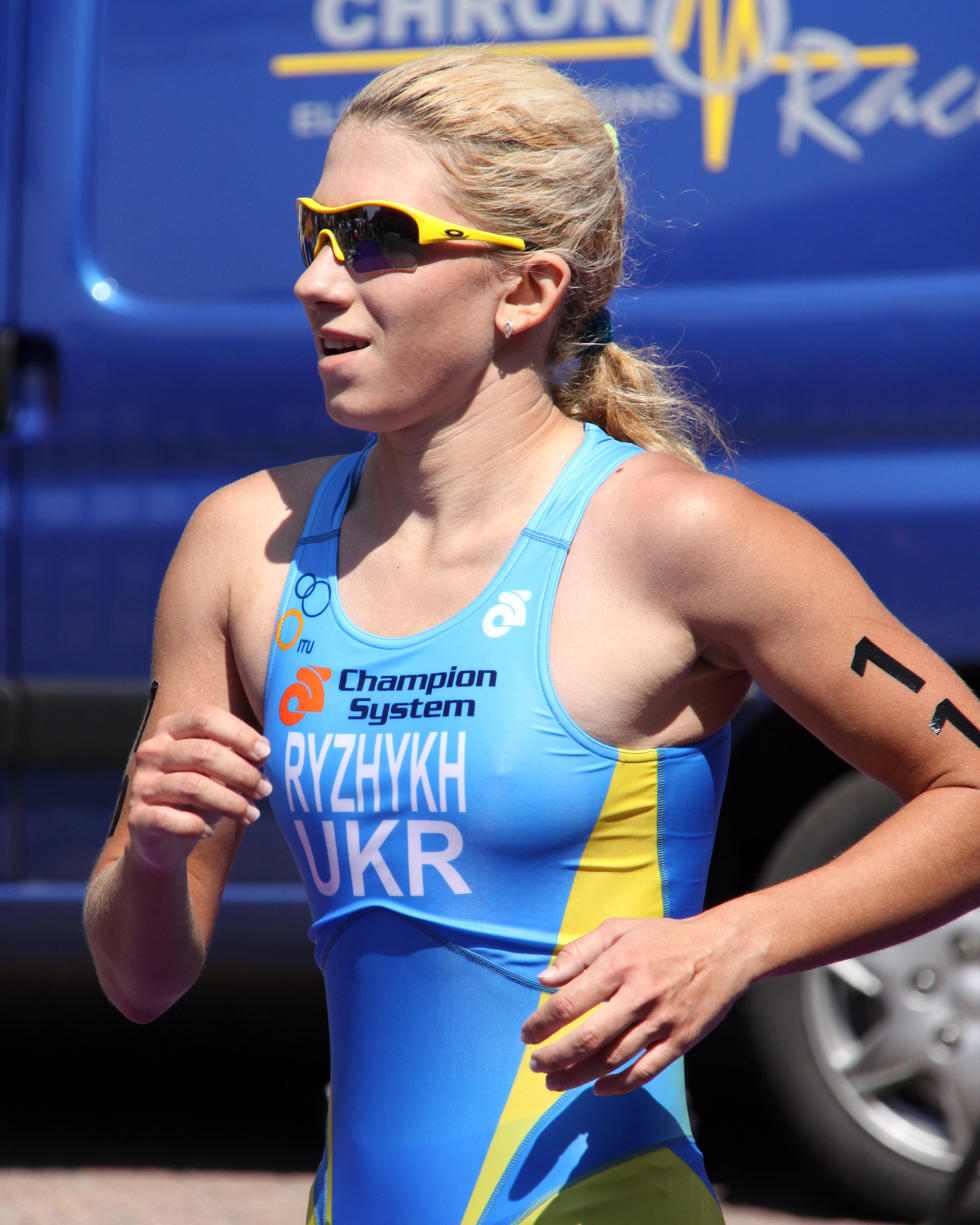
Inna Ryzhykh at the Premium European Cup triathlon in Brasschaat, 2010.

Inna Ryzhykh (Ukrainian Інна Володимирівна Рижих; born 15 November 1985 in Dnipropetrovsk, Ukrainian Дніпропетровськ) is a professional Ukrainian triathlete, silver medalist at the Ukrainian Championships of 2010, and a permanent member of the national team.

At the European Police Championships in Kitzbuhel (15 August 2010), Ryzhykh placed 3rd in the individual ranking and 1st in the team ranking together with Yuliya Sapunova and Victoria Kachan.

== ITU Competitions ==
In the six years from 2005 to 2010, Ryzhykh took part in 21 ITU competitions, achieving 4 top ten positions.

The following list is based upon the official ITU rankings and the "Athlete's Profile Page." Unless indicated otherwise, the following events are triathlons (Olympic distance) and belong to the Elite category.

Date	ITU Competition	Place	Rank
2005-07-17	European Championships (U23)	Sofia	DNF
2005-08-14	World Cup	Tiszaújváros	28
2006-06-23	European Championships	Autun	DNF
2006-07-08	European Championships (U23)	Rijeka	26
2006-08-13	BG World Cup	Tiszaújváros	DNS
2006-09-17	Premium European Cup	Kedzierzyn Kozle	14
2006-10-18	Premium European Cup	Alanya	17
2007-05-20	Premium European Cup	Sanremo	DNS
2007-07-21	European Championships (U23)	Kuopio	14
2007-09-09	Premium European Cup	Kedzierzyn Kozle	DNF
2007-10-24	Premium European Cup	Alanya	DNF
2008-05-18	European Cup	Brno	DNF
2008-06-14	European Cup	Balatonfured	13
2008-07-13	BG World Cup	Tiszaújváros	22
2008-07-27	Premium European Cup	Poznan	DNF
2009-07-25	European Cup and Balkan Championships	Varna	4
2009-08-30	Premium European Cup	Kedzierzyn Kozle	19
2010-04-17	European Cup	Antalya	4
2010-05-22	European Cup	Senec	DNF
2010-06-27	Premium European Cup	Brasschaat	7
2010-07-10	World Cup	Holten	DNF
2010-08-21	Sprint World Championships	Lausanne	40
2010-09-19	European Cup and Balkan Championships	Loutraki	4
2011-04-03	European Cup	Antalya	13
2011-05-15	Asian Cup	Seoul	5
2011-06-24	European Championships	Pontevedra	31
2011-07-03	European Cup	Penza	6
