= Oleksandr Shpyn =

Ukrainian acrobatic gymnast

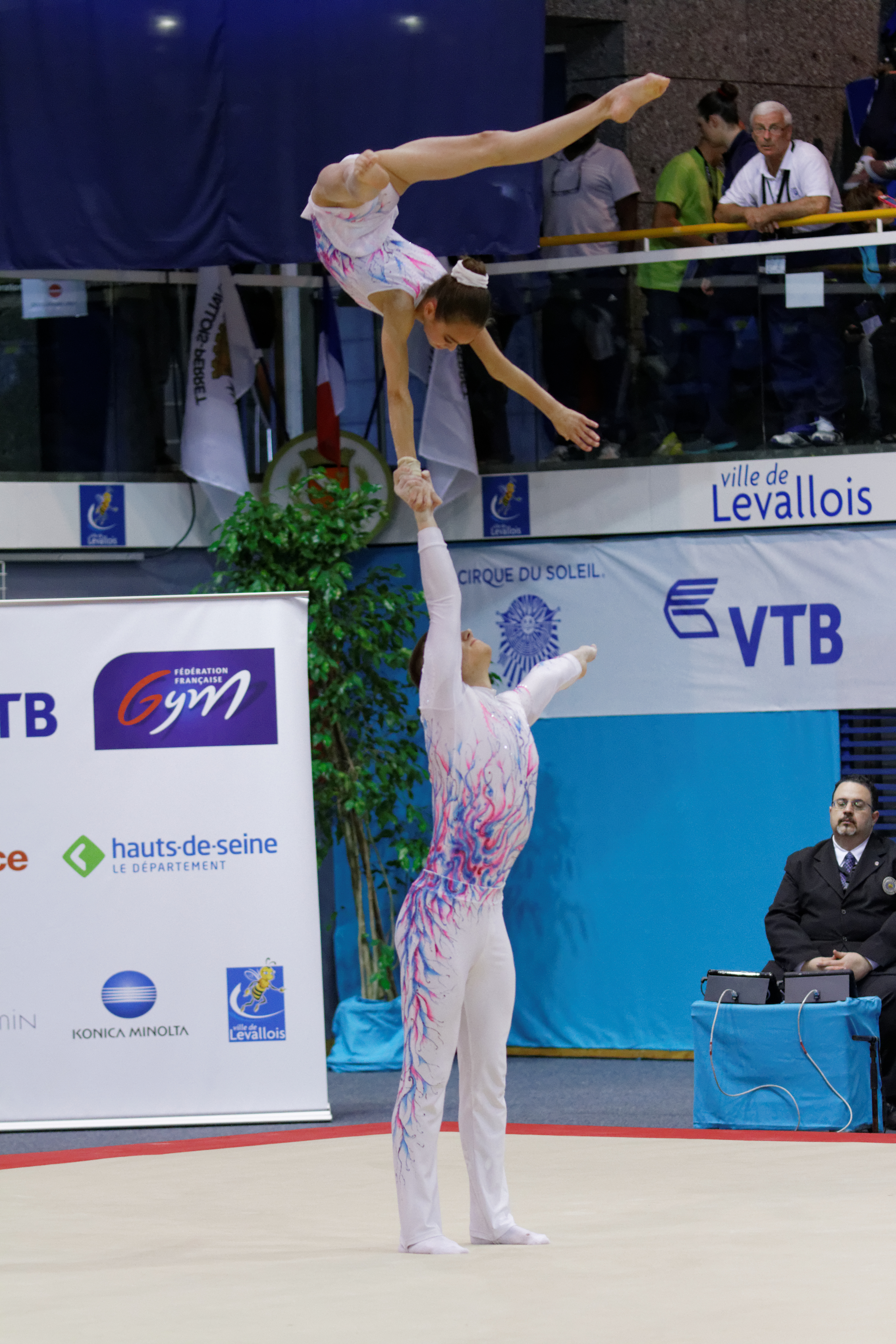
- Oleksandr Shpyn at the 2014 Acrobatic Gymnastics World Championships

Personal information
- Born: 7 March 1996 (age 30)

Gymnastics career
- Discipline: Acrobatic gymnastics
- Country represented: Ukraine

Oleksandr Shpyn (born 7 March 1996) is a Ukrainian male acrobatic gymnast. Along with partner, Yelyzaveta Vasylyga, he finished 6th in the 2014 Acrobatic Gymnastics World Championships. Following his gymnastics career, he appeared on stage at the GOP Varieté-Theater in Germany.
