= Marharyta Dzhusova =

Ukrainian female diver

Personal information
- Born: 25 November 1998 (age 27) Zaporizhzhia Oblast
Medal record
Women's diving
Representing Ukraine
European Games
Bronze medal – third place	2015 Baku	3m synchro

Marharyta Dzhusova (Ukrainian: Джусова Маргарита Вадимівна; born 29 November 1998) is a Ukrainian diver. She won a bronze medal at the 2015 European Games in 3m synchro together with Diana Shelestyuk. She also finished 13th in the 3m springboard event and 22nd in the 1m springboard event at the Games.
