= Yelyzaveta Vasylyga =

Ukrainian acrobatic gymnast

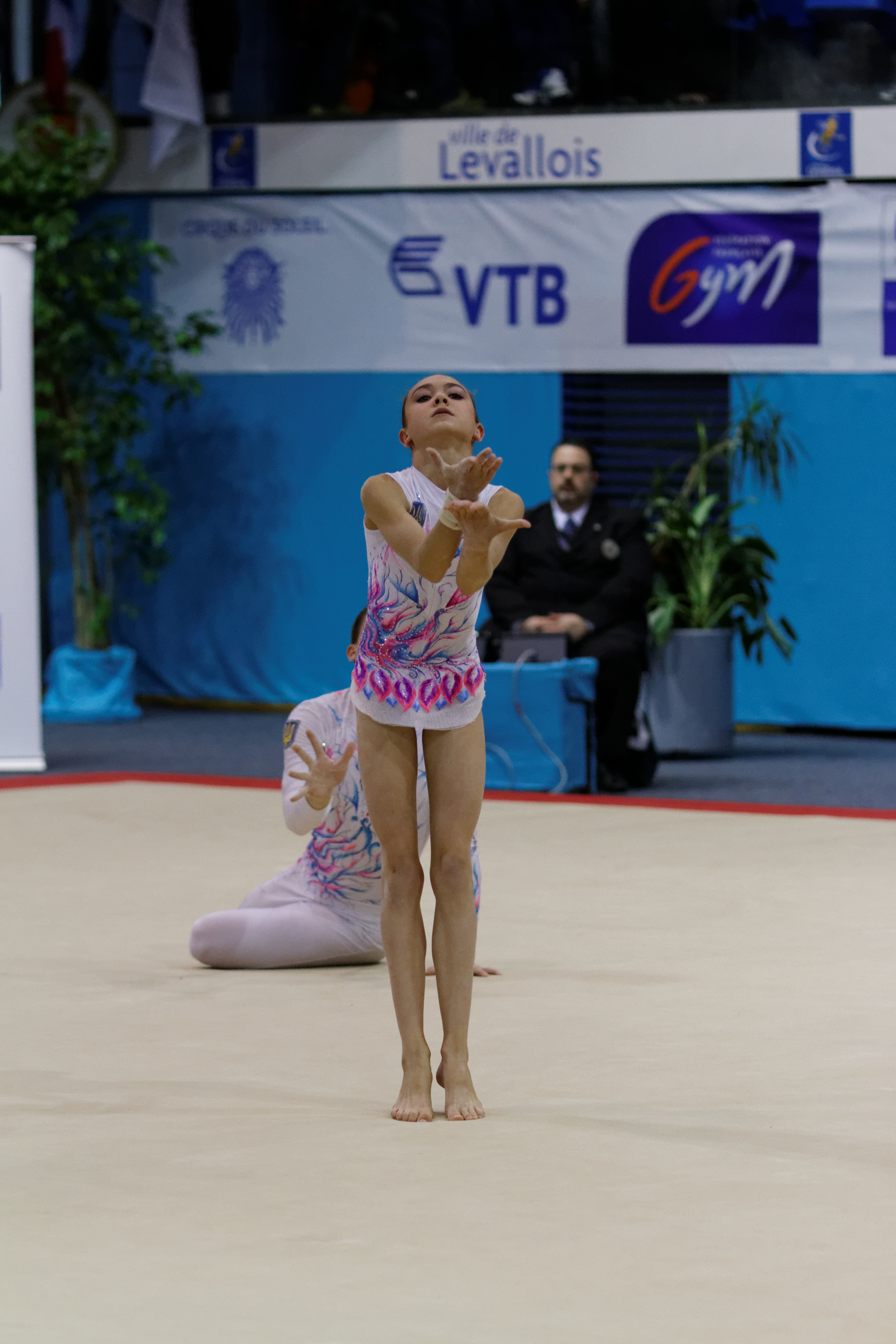
- Yelyzaveta Vasylyga at the 2014 Acrobatic Gymnastics World Championships

Personal information
- Born: October 2, 1998 (age 27)

Gymnastics career
- Discipline: Acrobatic gymnastics
- Country represented: Ukraine

Yelyzaveta Vasylyga (born October 2, 1998) is a Ukrainian female acrobatic gymnast. Along with partner, Oleksandr Shpyn, she finished 6th in the 2014 Acrobatic Gymnastics World Championships.
