= Andriy Khloptsov =

Ukrainian swimmer (born 1998)

Andrii Khloptsov
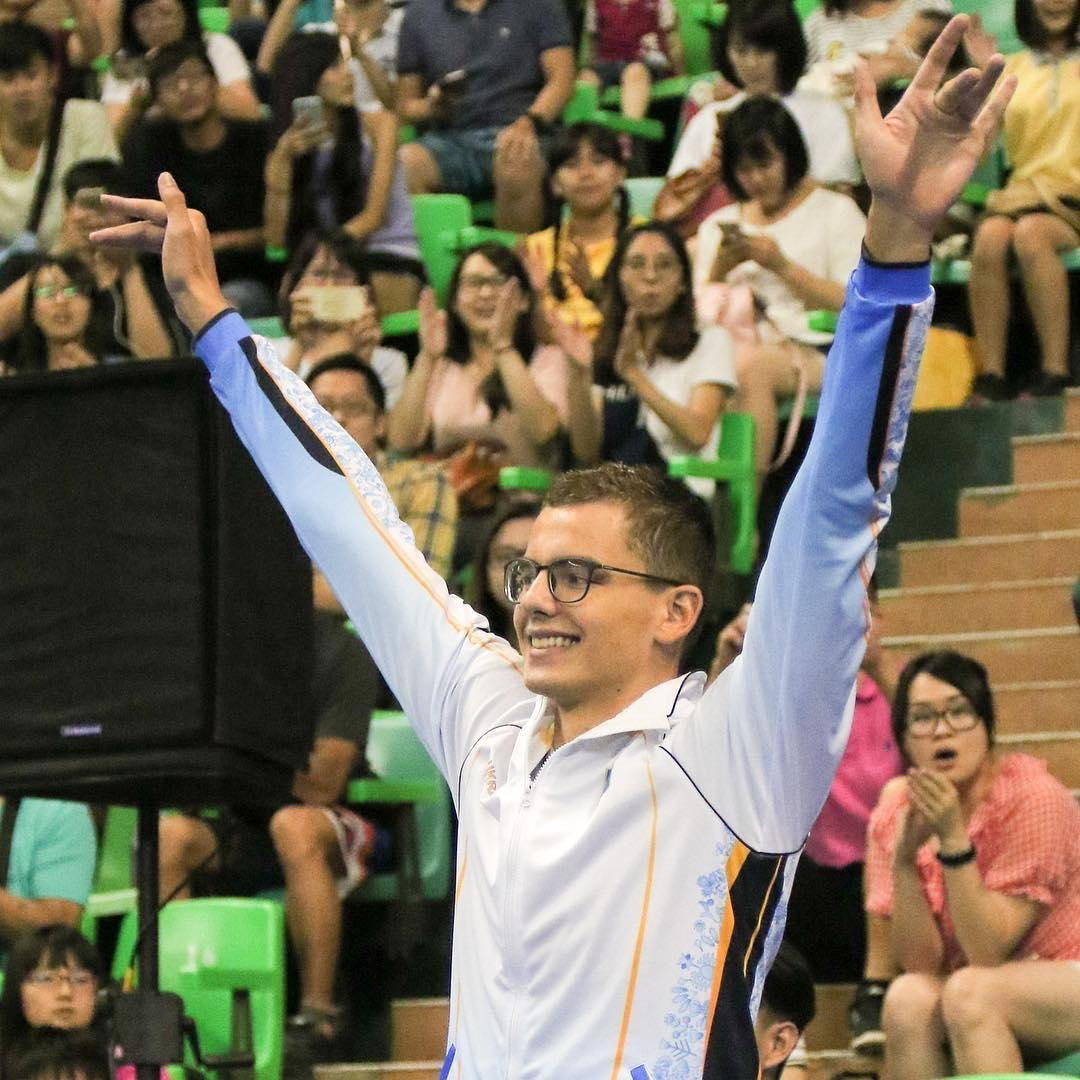
- Andrii Khloptsov at World University Games in Taipei

Personal information
- Full name: Andrii Khloptsov
- Nationality: Ukrainian
- Born: December 10, 1998 (age 27)

Sport
- Sport: Swimming
Medal record
Men's swimming
Representing Ukraine
Summer Universiade
Silver medal – second place	2017 Taipei	100 m butterfly
Bronze medal – third place	2017 Taipei	50 m butterfly
European Games
Gold medal – first place	2015 Baku	50 m butterfly
Bronze medal – third place	2015 Baku	50 m backstroke
World Junior Championships
Gold medal – first place	2015 Singapore	50 m butterfly
European Junior Championships
Gold medal – first place	2016 Hódmezővásárhely	50 m butterfly
European Youth Olympic Festival
Silver medal – second place	2013 Utrecht	100 m backstroke
Bronze medal – third place	2013 Utrecht	4×100m medley relay
Bronze medal – third place	2013 Utrecht	4×100m mixed medley relay

Andrii Khloptsov (Ukrainian: Андрій Андрійович Хлопцов; born 10 December 1998) is a Ukrainian former competitive swimmer who represented Ukraine in the FINA world aquatic championships and European championships and European Olympic Games.

He won gold and bronze medals at the 2015 European Games. Finalist of 2017 World Aquatics Championships in Budapest on distance 50 meters butterfly. He won gold medal at 2015 FINA World Junior Swimming Championships in Singapore. He won gold medal at European Junior Championship in 2016 European Junior Swimming Championships. He won silver and bronze at 2017 Summer Universiade.

At the start of career he was coached by his father and later he was coached by famous coach James Gibson (swimmer) in Energy Standard. Now he is a swimming coach living in Singapore.
