= Anna Limbach =

German fencer (born 1989)

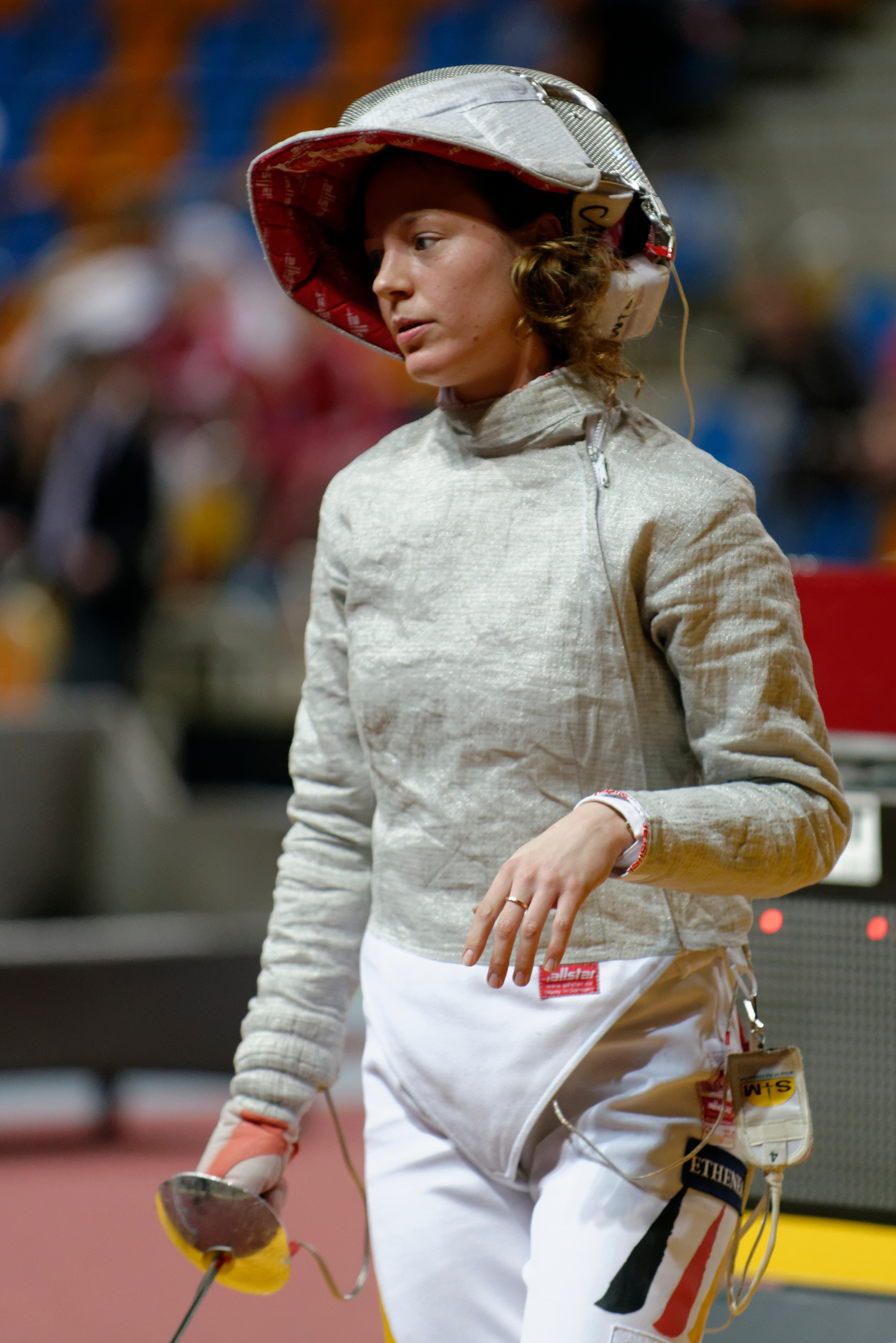
- Limbach at the 2014 Orléans Grand Prix

Personal information
- Full name: Anna Marie Christine Limbach
- Nationality: German
- Born: 22 July 1989 (age 36) Eupen, Belgium
- Home town: Cologne, Germany
- Height: 1.73 m (5 ft 8 in)
- Weight: 58 kg (128 lb)

Fencing career
- Sport: Fencing
- Country: Germany
- Weapon: Sabre
- Hand: Right-handed
- National coach: Eero Lehmann
- Club: TSV Bayer Dormagen
- Head coach: Pierre Guichot
- FIE ranking: current ranking

Anna Limbach (born 22 July 1989) is a German sabre fencer.

Anna Limbach is a German Sabre Fencer. She started fencing when she was four years old. She participated in her first World Championships by the age of 15 in South Korea. Since 2006 she has been a member of the senior German national team. Limbach won the German fencing championships 2006, 2008, 2009, 2011, 2014, and 2019 with the sabre team. In 2015, 2016, 2017 and 2018 she won the sabre title at both the German Individual Championships and the Team Championships [1].

In 2008 she won bronze with the saber team at the European Junior Championships in Prague. Limbach's greatest successes so far include 5th place at the 2016 European Championships in Tbilisi and 5th place at the 2017 World Championships in Leipzig. A 3rd place at the Grand Prix in Seoul enabled her to improve to 10th place in the world rankings in the 2017/2018 season [1].

Limbach graduated with a degree in economics from St. John's University in New York City. She received a Master of Science degree from the University of Cologne in Corporate Development.

Limbach was born in a fencing family: her father Alfred is an engineer but highly involved as a sports administrator and her elder brother Nicolas is twice sabre World champion.
