= Bruno Blašković =

Croatian swimmer (born 1998)

Personal information
- Born: 2 August 1998 (age 27) Vodnjan, Croatia

Sport
- Sport: Swimming

Bruno Blašković (born 2 August 1998) is a Croatian swimmer. He represented Croatia at the 2019 World Aquatics Championships held in Gwangju, South Korea and he finished in 33rd place in the heats in the men's 50 metre freestyle event. In the men's 100 metre freestyle he finished in 27th place in the heats.

In 2015, he competed in the men's 50 metre freestyle and men's 100 metre freestyle events at the European Games held in Baku, Azerbaijan.
