= Martina Criscio =

Italian fencer (born 1994)

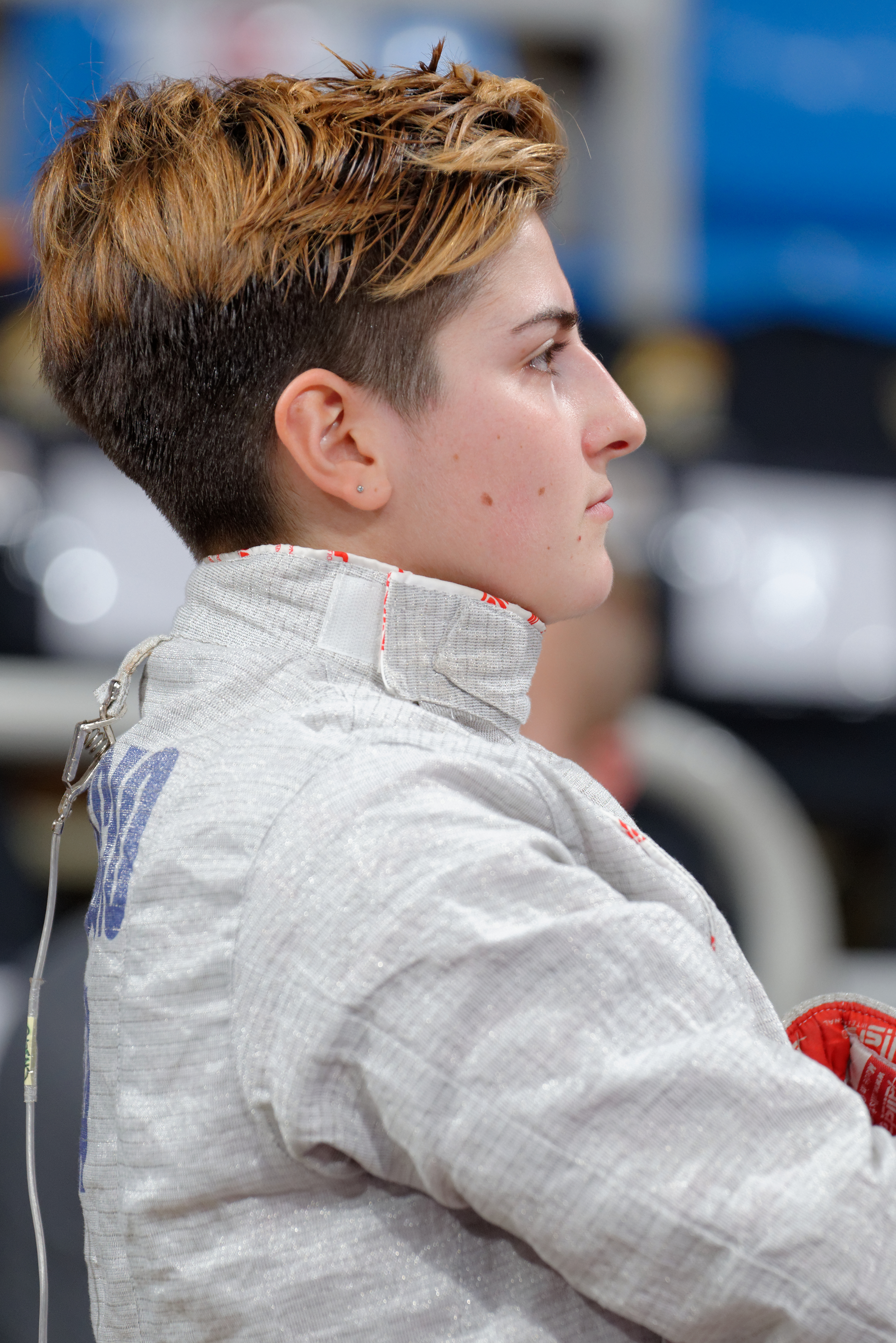
- Criscio in 2014

Personal information
- Nationality: Italian
- Born: 24 January 1994 (age 32) Foggia

Fencing career
- Sport: Fencing
- Weapon: Sabre
- Hand: left-handed
- National coach: Giovanni Sirovich
- Club: CS Esercito
- Head coach: Benedetto Buenza
- FIE ranking: current ranking
Medal record
Women's sabre
Representing Italy
World Championships
Gold medal – first place	2017 Leipzig	Team
European Games
Silver medal – second place	2015 Baku	Team
Silver medal – second place	2023 Kraków–Małopolska	Team
European Championships
Gold medal – first place	2017 Tbilisi	Team
Silver medal – second place	2022 Antalya	Team
Silver medal – second place	2023 Kraków	Team
Bronze medal – third place	2023 Plovdiv	Individual

Martina Criscio (born 24 January 1994 in Foggia) is an Italian fencer, specialist of sabre.

She won the gold medal at World Championships of Leipzig 2017, with the Italian team. She competed at the 2020 Summer Olympics, in Sabre.
