= Diana Shelestyuk =

Ukrainian diver

Personal information
- Born: 17 March 1997 (age 29) Mykolaiv, Ukraine
- Height: 160 cm (5 ft 3 in)
- Weight: 56 kg (123 lb)

Sport
- Sport: Diving
Medal record
Representing Ukraine
European Games
| Bronze medal – third place | 2015 Baku | 1m springboard |
| Bronze medal – third place | 2015 Baku | 3m springboard synchro |

Diana Volodymyrivna Shelestyuk (born 17 March 1997) is a Ukrainian diver, lives in the city of Mykolaiv, Ship area.

She has been involved in sports since the age of six. She won her first sports award in 2005. Diana graduated from the Nikolaev secondary school №54.

She Studies at the Nikolaev National University named after V. A. Sukhomlinsky.

== Achievements ==
- 2012 — European champion in diving from a 1-meter springboard in Austria;
- 2013 — a silver medal at the European Championships in Poland, in synchronized diving from a 3-meter springboard with Hanna Krasnoshlyk;
- 2014 — a bronze medal at the European Championships in Italy in synchronized diving from a 3-meter springboard, together with Hanna Krasnoshlyk;
- a bronze medal in the finals of the women's meter springboard diving competition at the European Games (Baku);
- at the European Games in Baku in synchronized diving from a 3-meter springboard, she won a silver medal together with Marharyta Dzhusova;
- 2020 — a bronze medal at the FINA 2020 Grand Prix in Madrid, she paired with Elena Fedorova in synchronized jumping from a 3-meter springboard.
