= Olha Zhovnir =

Ukrainian fencer (born 1989)

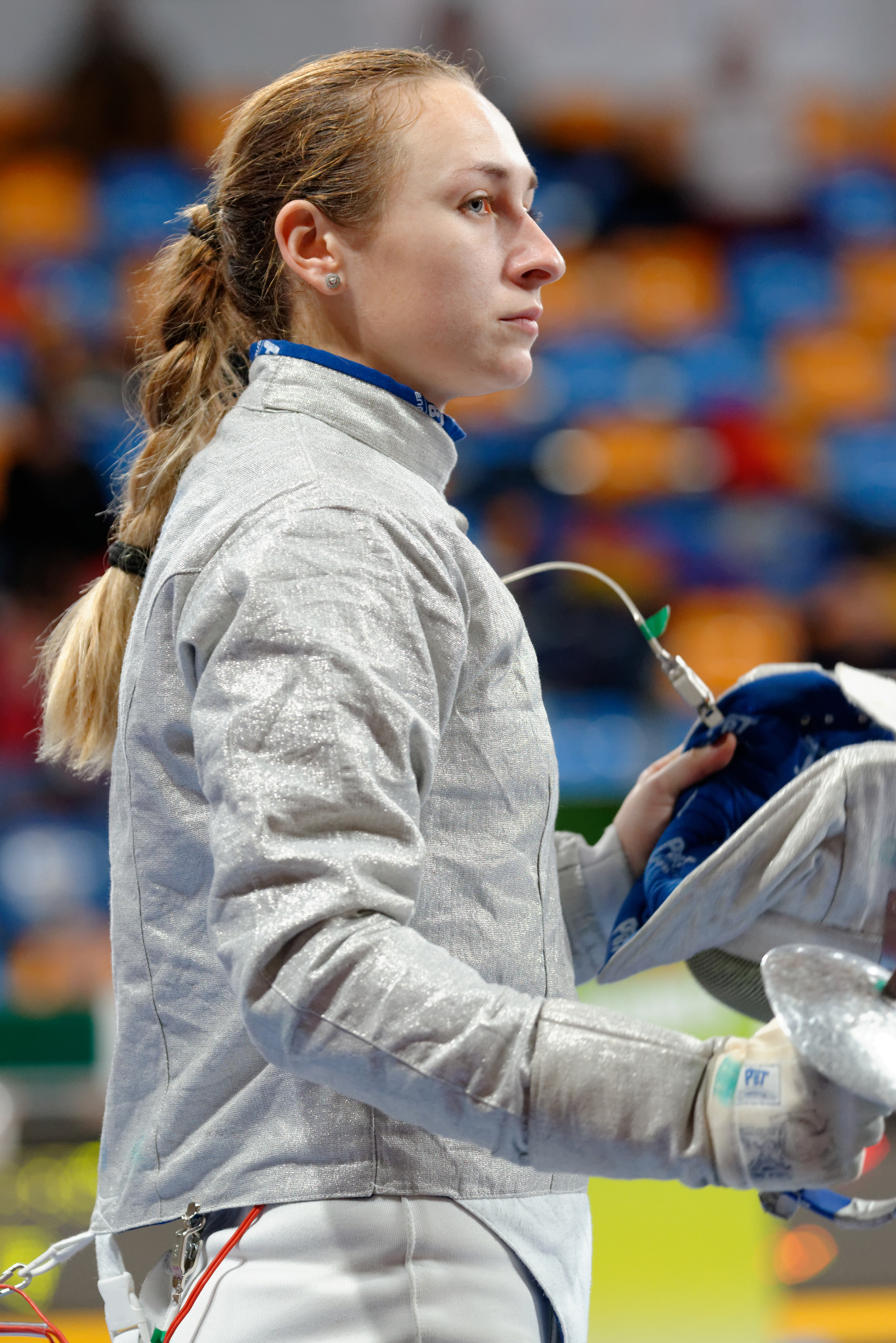

Personal information
- Born: 8 June 1989 (age 37) Netishyn, Ukrainian SSR, Soviet Union
- Height: 1.65 m (5 ft 5 in)
- Weight: 55 kg (121 lb)

Fencing career
- Sport: Fencing
- Weapon: sabre
- Hand: right-handed
- National coach: Artem Skorokhod
- Club: CSKA
- FIE ranking: current ranking
Medal record
Women's sabre
Olympic Games
Gold medal – first place	2008 Beijing	Team sabre
World Championships
Gold medal – first place	2009 Antalya	Team sabre
Silver medal – second place	2010 Paris	Team sabre
Silver medal – second place	2011 Catania	Team sabre
Silver medal – second place	2012 Kyiv	Team sabre
Bronze medal – third place	2014 Kazan	Team sabre
European Games
Gold medal – first place	Baku 2015	Team
European Championships
Gold medal – first place	2010 Leipzig	Team sabre
Silver medal – second place	2011 Sheffield	Team sabre
Bronze medal – third place	2014 Strasbourg	Team sabre
Summer Universiade
Silver medal – second place	2007 Bangkok	Team sabre

Olha Bohdanivna Zhovnir (Ukrainian: Ольга Богданівна Жовнір; born 8 June 1989) is a Ukrainian fencer and member of the team which won the gold medal in sabre at the 2008 Summer Olympics.

The Ukrainian team (she has stayed a member of) won gold in the Sabre final beating Russia during the 2010 European Fencing Championship. At the 2009 World Fencing Championships Zhovnir and her teammates beat France to win gold. The team won the title "Team of the Year" at the (Ukrainian) "Sports Heroes of the Year 2009" ceremony in April 2010.
