= Margaux Rifkiss =

French fencer

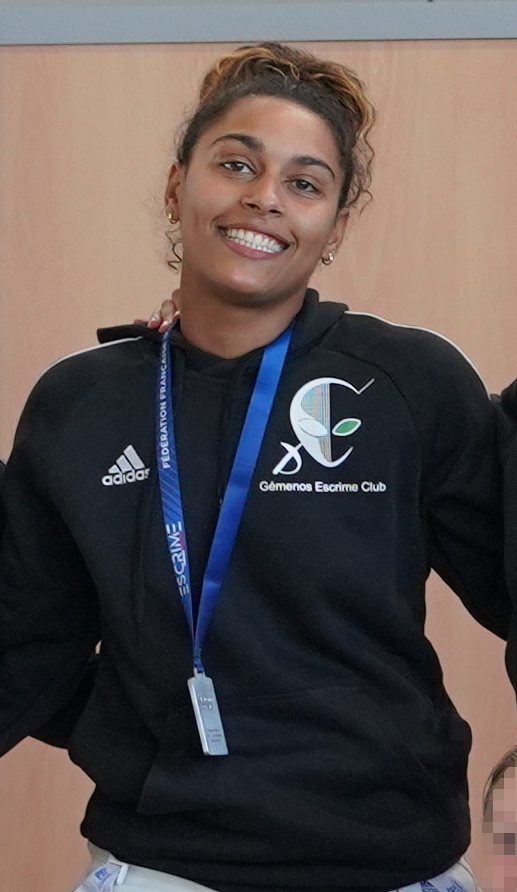
- Rifkiss at the 2023 French Fencing Championships

Fencing career
- Sport: Fencing
- Country: France
- Weapon: sabre
- Club: Paris ATP; Maisons-Alfort; Gémenos Escrime Club
Medal record
Women's sabre
Representing France
World Championships
Silver medal – second place	2023 Milan	Team
European Games
Gold medal – first place	2023 Kraków–Małopolska	Team
Bronze medal – third place	2015 Baku	Individual
European Championships
Gold medal – first place	2023 Kraków	Team
Universiade
Bronze medal – third place	2017 Taipei	Team
Bronze medal – third place	2019 Naples	Team

Margaux Rifkiss (born 9 June 1996 in Paris) is a French female sabre fencer.

== Metals ==
=== European Games ===
Year	Championship	Category	Result
2015	Fencing at the 2015 European Games	Team sabre	3rd place, bronze medalist(s)
2023	Fencing at the 2023 European Games	Team sabre	1st place, gold medalist(s)

=== French Fencing Championships ===
Year	Championship	Category	Result
2015	2015 French Fencing Championships	Team sabre	3rd place, bronze medalist(s)
2016	2016 French Fencing Championships	Individual	3rd place, bronze medalist(s)
2017	2017 French Fencing Championships	Individual	2nd place, silver medalist(s)
2018	2018 French Fencing Championships	Team sabre	3rd place, bronze medalist(s)
2018	2018 French Fencing Championships	Individual	2nd place, silver medalist(s)
2019	2019 French Fencing Championships	Individual	3rd place, bronze medalist(s)
2022	2022 French Fencing Championships	Team sabre	3rd place, bronze medalist(s)
2023	2023 French Fencing Championships	Team sabre	2nd place, silver medalist(s)
