= Sergii Shevtsov =

Ukrainian swimmer (born 1998)

Personal information
- Nationality: Ukrainian
- Born: 29 June 1998 (age 28) Zaporizhzhia, Ukraine
- Height: 1.93 m (6 ft 4 in)
- Weight: 88 kg (194 lb)

Sport
- Sport: Swimming
Medal record
Men's swimming
Representing Ukraine
European Junior Championships
Silver medal – second place	2016 Hódmezővásárhely	100 m freestyle

Sergii Shevtsov (born 29 June 1998) is a Ukrainian swimmer. He competed in the men's 50 metre freestyle event at the 2018 FINA World Swimming Championships (25 m), in Hangzhou, China.
