= Finland at the 2015 European Games =

- IOC code: FIN
- NOC: Finnish Olympic Committee
- Website: www.olympiakomitea.fi

in Baku, Azerbaijan 12 – 28 June 2015
- Competitors: 100 in 17 sports
- Flag bearer: Tomi Tuuha
- Medals Ranked 40th: Gold 0 Silver 0 Bronze 1 Total 1

European Games appearances (overview)
- 2015; 2019; 2023; 2027

Finland participated at the 2015 European Games, in Baku, Azerbaijan from 12 to 28 June 2015.

== Medalists ==
Medal	Name	Sport	Event	Date
Bronze	Marko Kemppainen	Shooting	Men's skeet	21 June

== Team ==
Competitors from Finland per sport
Sport	Men	Women	Total
Archery	1	1	2
Badminton	1	3	4
Beach volley	2	4	6
Boxing	2	2	4
Canoe sprint	3	1	4
Cycling mountain bike	1	1	2
Cycling road	1	1	2
Diving	1	3	4
Fencing	1	1	2
Gymnastics aerobic	0	5	5
Gymnastics artistic	3	0	3
Gymnastics rhythmic	0	6	6
Judo	3	1	4
Karate	1	1	2
Shooting	5	3	8
Swimming	4	12	16
Table tennis	1	0	1
Taekwondo	0	1	1
Triathlon	0	1	1
Volleyball	12	0	12
Wrestling	9	2	11
Total	51	49	100

Chef de Mission: Leena Paavolainen.

== Archery ==
Athlete	Event	Ranking round		1/32 Eliminations	1/16 Eliminations	1/8 Eliminations	Quarterfinals	Semifinals	Finals	Rank
Athlete	Event	Score	Seed	Opposition Score	Opposition Score	Opposition Score	Opposition Score	Opposition Score	Opposition Score	Rank
Taru Kuoppa	Women's individual	630	26	Aktuna (TUR); 6–2 L	Did not advance					33
Antti Tekoniemi	Men's individual	664	16	Gross (EST); 1–7 W	Napłoszek (POL); 6–2 L	Did not advance				17
Antti Tekoniemi; Taru Kuoppa	Mixed team	1294	13	—N/a		Sichenikova/Ivanytskyy (UKR); 0–6 L	Did not advance			9

== Badminton ==
Athletes	Event	Group play stage				Round of 16	Quarterfinals	Semifinals	Finals	Rank
Athletes	Event	Opposition Score	Opposition Score	Opposition Score	Rank	Opposition Score	Opposition Score	Opposition Score	Opposition Score	Rank
Eetu Heino	Men's singles	Vicen (SVK); 2–0 W	Gunnarsson (ISL); 2–1 W	Vadimovich Malkov (RUS); 2–0 L	2	Domke (GER); 2–0 L	Did not advance			9
Airi Mikkelä	Women's singles	Madsen (DEN); 2–0 L	Sadowski (MLT); 0–2 W	Högnadóttir (ISL); 0–2 W	2	Zechiri (BUL); 2–0 L	Did not advance			9
Nyström; Lindholm	Women's doubles	Darragh/Boyle (IRL); 0–2 W	Bolotova/Kosetskaya (RUS); 2–0 L	Baumann/Fontaine (FRA); 0–2 L	3	—N/a	Did not advance			9

== Boxing ==
Athlete	Event	Round of 32	Round of 16	Quarterfinals	Semifinals	Finals	Rank
Athlete	Event	Opposition Result	Opposition Result	Opposition Result	Opposition Result	Opposition Result	Rank
Matti Koota	Men's 56 kg	Bye	Jensen (DEN); 1–2 L WP	Did not advance			
Marjut Lausti	Women's 54 kg	—N/a	Davide (ITA); 0–3 L WP	Did not advance			
Mira Potkonen	Women's 60 kg	—N/a	Alekseevna (AZE); 3–0 L WP	Did not advance			
Dmitri Tretyak	Men's 75 kg	Král (CZE); 3–0 W WP	Venko (SLO); 2–1 L WP	Did not advance			

== Canoe sprint ==
Athlete	Event	Heats		Semifinals		Final	
Athlete	Event	Time	Rank	Time	Rank	Time	Rank
Miika Dietrich	Men's K1 1000 m	3:40.061	5 QS	3:28.064	5 FB	3:37.298	13
Miika Dietrich	Men's K1 5000 m	—N/a				21:36.697	10
Oona Vasko	Women's K1 500 m	1:56.503	8 X	Did not advance			
Oona Vasko	Women's K1 5000 m	—N/a				Did not finish	
Miika Nykänen; Jeremy Hakala	Men's K2 1000 m	3:18.144	5 QS	3:13.568	5 X	Did not advance	

== Cycling ==
=== Mountain biking ===
Athlete	Event	Time	Rank
Sonja Kallio	Women's cross-country	−2 laps	22
Jukka Vastaranta	Men's cross-country	−3 laps	31

=== Road ===
Athlete	Event	Time	Rank
Samuel Pokala	Men's individual time trial	1:06:16.97	28
Samuel Pokala	Men's road race	Did not finish	
Sari Saarelainen	Women's individual time trial	35:21.73	13
Sari Saarelainen	Women's road race	3:34:09	45

== Diving ==
Athlete	Event	Preliminary Round		Final	
Athlete	Event	Points	Rank	Points	Rank
Juho Junttila	Men's 1 metre springboard	409.25	13 R	Did not advance	
Juho Junttila	Men's 3 metre springboard	454.30	15	Did not advance	
Roosa Kanerva	Women's 1 metre springboard	356.10	11 Q	381.15	7
Saija Paavola	Women's platform	340.70	8 Q	323.25	10
Ellen Sirkka	Women's platform	320.50	12 Q	302.00	12

== Fencing ==
Athlete	Event	Pool Round		Table of 32	Table of 16	Quarterfinals	Semifinals	Finals	Rank
Athlete	Event	Opposition Score	Rank	Opposition Score	Opposition Score	Opposition Score	Opposition Score	Opposition Score	Rank
Catharina Kock	Women's individual épée	Santuccio (ITA); 1–4 L	20 Q	Bukócki (HUN); 12–15 W	Sivkova (RUS); 15–14 W	Brânză (ROU); 15–4 L	Did not advance		8
Catharina Kock	Women's individual épée	Shemyakina (UKR); 3–5 L	20 Q	Bukócki (HUN); 12–15 W	Sivkova (RUS); 15–14 W	Brânză (ROU); 15–4 L	Did not advance		8
Catharina Kock	Women's individual épée	Andryushina (RUS); 4–5 W	20 Q	Bukócki (HUN); 12–15 W	Sivkova (RUS); 15–14 W	Brânză (ROU); 15–4 L	Did not advance		8
Catharina Kock	Women's individual épée	Tătăran (ROU); 5–3 L	20 Q	Bukócki (HUN); 12–15 W	Sivkova (RUS); 15–14 W	Brânză (ROU); 15–4 L	Did not advance		8
Catharina Kock	Women's individual épée	Malikova (AZE); 5–0 W	20 Q	Bukócki (HUN); 12–15 W	Sivkova (RUS); 15–14 W	Brânză (ROU); 15–4 L	Did not advance		8
Catharina Kock	Women's individual épée	Lehis (EST); 4–5 W	20 Q	Bukócki (HUN); 12–15 W	Sivkova (RUS); 15–14 W	Brânză (ROU); 15–4 L	Did not advance		8
Niko Vuorinen	Men's individual épée	Glebko (RUS); 5–4 W	4 Q	Bye	Niggeler (SUI); 15–14 W	Trevejo (FRA); 10–15 L	Did not advance		5
Niko Vuorinen	Men's individual épée	Jerent (FRA); 5–2 W	4 Q	Bye	Niggeler (SUI); 15–14 W	Trevejo (FRA); 10–15 L	Did not advance		5
Niko Vuorinen	Men's individual épée	Hasanov (AZE); 5–2 W	4 Q	Bye	Niggeler (SUI); 15–14 W	Trevejo (FRA); 10–15 L	Did not advance		5
Niko Vuorinen	Men's individual épée	Santarelli (ITA); 5–4 W	4 Q	Bye	Niggeler (SUI); 15–14 W	Trevejo (FRA); 10–15 L	Did not advance		5
Niko Vuorinen	Men's individual épée	Kuhn (SUI); 4–5 L	4 Q	Bye	Niggeler (SUI); 15–14 W	Trevejo (FRA); 10–15 L	Did not advance		5
Niko Vuorinen	Men's individual épée	Jefremenko (LAT); 5–2 W	4 Q	Bye	Niggeler (SUI); 15–14 W	Trevejo (FRA); 10–15 L	Did not advance		5

== Gymnastics ==
=== Aerobic ===
Athletes	Event	Qualification		Final	
Athletes	Event	Points	Rank	Points	Rank
Suvi Aahlgren; Mila Koljander; Jasmin Koskinen; Tanja Martikainen; Laura Vihervä	Mixed aerobic groups	18.233	9	Did not advance	

=== Artistic ===
==== Men ====
===== Individual events =====
Athlete	Stage	Apparatus						All-Around
Athlete	Stage	FX Rank	PH Rank	SR Rank	VT Rank	PB Rank	HB Rank	All-Around
Karl Oskar Kirmes	Qualification	14.100; 27	13.433; 27	13.333; 34	—N/a	13.100; 59	12.733; 66	80.465; 36
Karl Oskar Kirmes	Final	dna	dna	dna	—N/a	dna	dna	dna
Heikki Niva	Qualification	—N/a	11.333; 68	—N/a	—N/a	13.300; 51	13.966; 24	—N/a
Heikki Niva	Final	—N/a	dna	—N/a	—N/a	dna	dna	—N/a
Tomi Tuuha	Qualification	14.200; 23	0.000; 79	13.700; 23	14.650; 4 Q	13.500; 43	—N/a	—N/a
Tomi Tuuha	Final	dna	dna	dna	14.916; 4	dna	—N/a	—N/a

==== Team all-around event ====
Athlete	Apparatus					
Athlete	FX	PH	SR	VT	PB	HB
Karl Oskar Kirmes	14.100	13.433	13.333	13.766	(13.100)	12.733
Heikki Niva	—N/a	11.333	—N/a	—N/a	13.300	13.966
Tomi Tuuha	14.200	(0.000)	13.700	14.800	13.500	—N/a
Total score	28.300	24.766	27.033	28.566	26.800	26.699
All-around total Rank	162.164; 19					

Parentheses indicate a score discarded for the total.

=== Rhythmic ===
==== Group ====
Athletes	Apparatus Qualification & All-Around Final			Apparatus Finals	
Athletes	Ribbons Rank	Clubs & Hoops Rank	All-Around Rank	Ribbons Rank	Clubs & Hoops Rank
Sonja Kokkonen; Heleri Kolkkanen; Elina Koprinen; Iina Linna; Aino Purje; Kati Rantsi	14.900; 13	16.350; 8 R2	31.250; 11	Did not advance	Did not advance

== Judo ==
Athlete	Event	Round of 64	Round of 32	Round of 16	Quarterfinals	Semifinals	Repechage	Bronze / Gold	Rank
Athlete	Event	Opposition Result	Opposition Result	Opposition Result	Opposition Result	Opposition Result	Opposition Result	Opposition Result	Rank
Eetu Laamanen	Men's 73 kg	Rothberg (EST); W by ippon	Fernandes (POR); L by yuko	Did not advance					
Juho Reinvall	Men's 60 kg	—N/a	Paischer (AUT); L by penalty	Did not advance					
Jaana Sundberg	Women's 52 kg	—N/a	Florian (ROU); L by penalty	Did not advance					
Antti Virta	Men's 81 kg	Bye	Ciano (ITA); L by ippon	Did not advance					

== Karate ==
Athlete	Event	Elimination round				Semifinals Round	Medals Round	Rank
Athlete	Event	Opposition Result	Opposition Result	Opposition Result	Rank	Opposition Result	Opposition Result	Rank
Pasi Hirvonen	Men's kata	Busato (ITA); 5–0 L	Quintero (ESP); 5–0 L	Rohde (DEN); 5–0 L	4	Did not advance		
Helena Kuusisto	Women's +68 kg	Zaytseva (RUS); 0–0 D	Ganeva (BUL); 0–2 L	Hocaoğlu (TUR); 1–0 L	4	Did not advance		

== Shooting ==
Athlete	Event	Qualifications		Semifinals		Finals	
Athlete	Event	Points	Rank	Points	Rank	Points	Rank
Marjut Heinonen	Women's skeet	69	9	Did not advance			
Marko Kemppainen	Men's skeet	123	3 QF	14	4 QF	15	(bronze)
Juho Kurki	Men's 10 metre air rifle	625.0	11	—N/a		Did not advance	
Juho Kurki	Men's 50 metre rifle prone	617.0	6 QF	—N/a		101.4	7
Juho Kurki	Men's 50 metre rifle three positions	1134	28	—N/a		Did not advance	
Simo Köylinen	Men's double trap	138	10	Did not advance			
Satu Mäkelä-Nummela	Women's trap	71	3 QF	12	5	Did not advance	
Sami Ritsilä	Men's double trap	139	9	Did not advance			
Tommi Takanen	Men's skeet	120	14	Did not advance			
Mopsi Veromaa	Women's trap	68	15	Did not advance			
Tommi Takanen; Marjut Heinonen	Mixed Skeet	88	10	Did not advance			

== Swimming ==
=== Men ===
Athlete	Event	Heats		Semifinals		Final	
Athlete	Event	Time	Rank	Time	Rank	Time	Rank
Christoffer Fredrikson	Men's 100 metre backstroke	57.41	24	Did not advance			
Christoffer Fredrikson	Men's 200 metre backstroke	2:04.19	15 Q	2:03.27	12	Did not advance	
Juho Grönblom	Men's 50 metre butterfly	26.03	53	Did not advance			
Juho Grönblom	Men's 800 metre freestyle	8:36.50	25	—N/a			
Juho Grönblom	Men's 1500 metre freestyle	16:25.13	22	—N/a			
Niko Mäkelä	Men's 50 metre butterfly	24.61	12 Q	24.43	10	Did not advance	
Niko Mäkelä	Men's 50 metre freestyle	23.92	38	Did not advance			
Niko Mäkelä	Men's 100 metre butterfly	56.07	25	Did not advance			
Niko Mäkelä	Men's 200 metre individual medley	2:10.12	35	Did not advance			
Nikita Saunonen	Men's 50 metre butterfly	25.29	33	Did not advance			
Nikita Saunonen	Men's 50 metre freestyle	23.65	26	Did not advance			
Nikita Saunonen	Men's 100 metre butterfly	57.57	45	Did not advance			
Nikita Saunonen	Men's 100 metre freestyle	52.50	49	Did not advance			

=== Women ===
Athlete	Event	Heats		Semifinals		Final	
Athlete	Event	Time	Rank	Time	Rank	Time	Rank
Melek Ayarci	Women's 50 metre backstroke	30.60	27	Did not advance			
Melek Ayarci	Women's 100 metre backstroke	1:06.40	28	Did not advance			
Melek Ayarci	Women's 200 metre backstroke	2:24.28	26	Did not advance			
Julia Bruneau	Women's 50 metre freestyle	27.27	35	Did not advance			
Julia Bruneau	Women's 100 metre freestyle	59.41	46	Did not advance			
Julia Bruneau	Women's 200 metre freestyle	2:09.77	47	Did not advance			
Julia Bruneau	Women's 200 metre individual medley	2:28.73	34	Did not advance			
Nea-Amanda Heinola	Women's 50 metre backstroke	31.46	42	Did not advance			
Nea-Amanda Heinola	Women's 50 metre butterfly	29.72	44	Did not advance			
Nea-Amanda Heinola	Women's 100 metre butterfly	1:05.45	34	Did not advance			
Nea-Amanda Heinola	Women's 200 metre individual medley	2:25.07	26	Did not advance			
Nea-Amanda Heinola	Women's 400 metre individual medley	5:05.45	14	—N/a		Did not advance	
Eveliina Kallio	Women's 50 metre backstroke	31.19	40	Did not advance			
Eveliina Kallio	Women's 100 metre freestyle	59.02	38	Did not advance			
Eveliina Kallio	Women's 100 metre backstroke	1:07.08	32	Did not advance			
Reetta Kanervo	Women's 50 metre freestyle	26.22	5 Q	26.16	6 Q	26.11	6
Reetta Kanervo	Women's 50 metre butterfly	27.84	8 Q	27.55	6 Q	27.64	7
Reetta Kanervo	Women's 100 metre freestyle	58.64	28	Did not advance			
Sini Koivu	Women's 50 metre breaststroke	33.51	17	Did not advance			
Sini Koivu	Women's 50 metre freestyle	26.64	12 Q	26.53	12	Did not advance	
Sini Koivu	Women's 100 metre breaststroke	1:12.55	18	Did not advance			
Sini Koivu	Women's 200 metre breaststroke	2:39.66	26	Did not advance			
Moona Koski	Women's 50 metre breaststroke	33.77	22	Did not advance			
Moona Koski	Women's 100 metre breaststroke	1:14.21	27	Did not advance			
Moona Koski	Women's 200 metre breaststroke	2:43.23	31	Did not advance			
Essi-Maria Lillman	Women's 200 metre breaststroke	2:37.53	18 Q	2:35.86	13	Did not advance	
Essi-Maria Lillman	Women's 200 metre individual medley	2:24.95	24	Did not advance			
Essi-Maria Lillman	Women's 400 metre individual medley	5:06.10	16	—N/a		Did not advance	
Essi-Maria Lillman	Women's 1500 metre freestyle	17:49.58	18	—N/a			
Alma Lumio	Women's 50 metre butterfly	28.04	12	Did not advance			
Alma Lumio	Women's 100 metre butterfly	1:04.47	31	Did not advance			
Roosa Mört	Women's 50 metre backstroke	30.81	33	Did not advance			
Roosa Mört	Women's 50 metre freestyle	26.77	19	Did not advance			
Roosa Mört	Women's 100 metre freestyle	57.63	18 Q	57.53	14	Did not advance	
Sohvi Nenonen	Women's 50 metre butterfly	27.91	10 Q	27.87	11	Did not advance	
Sohvi Nenonen	Women's 100 metre butterfly	1:02.12	10 Q	1:02.44	14	Did not advance	
Sohvi Nenonen	Women's 200 metre individual medley	2:22.50	16 Q	2:21.48	14	Did not advance	
Aino Otava	Women's 200 metre freestyle	2:08.31	36	Did not advance			
Aino Otava	Women's 400 metre freestyle	4:25.83	20	—N/a		Did not advance	
Aino Otava	Women's 800 metre freestyle	9:13.40	17	—N/a			
Roosa Mört; Eveliina Kallio; Sohvi Nenonen; Reetta Kanervo	Women's 4 × 100 metre freestyle relay	3:51.69	5 Q	—N/a		3:50.72	6
Eveliina Kallio; Sini Koivu; Sohvi Nenonen; Roosa Mört	Women's 4 × 100 metre medley relay	4:20.73	10	—N/a		Did not advance	
Nea-Amanda Heinola; Essi-Maria Lillman; Julia Bruneau; Melek Ayarci	Women's 4 × 200 metre freestyle relay	8:40.60	9	—N/a		Did not advance	

=== Mixed ===
Athlete	Event	Heats		Semifinals		Final	
Athlete	Event	Time	Rank	Time	Rank	Time	Rank
Christoffer Fredrikson; Sini Koivu; Niko Mäkelä; Aino Otava	Mixed 4 × 100 metre medley relay	4:05.90	10	—N/a		Did not advance	

== Table tennis ==
Athlete	Event	First round	Second round	Third round	Quarterfinals	Semifinals	Finals	Rank
Athlete	Event	Opposition Result	Opposition Result	Opposition Result	Opposition Result	Opposition Result	Opposition Result	Rank
Benedek Olah	Men's singles	Górak (POL); 4–2 L	Did not advance					

== Taekwondo ==
Athlete	Event	Preliminary Round	Quarterfinals	Semifinals	Repechage	Bronze / Gold	Rank
Athlete	Event	Opposition Result	Opposition Result	Opposition Result	Opposition Result	Opposition Result	Rank
Suvi Mikkonen	Women's 57 kg	Yangın (TUR); 4–7 L PTF	Did not advance				11

== Triathlon ==
Athlete	Event	Swim (1.5 km)	Trans 1	Bike (40 km)	Trans 2	Run (10 km)	Total Time	Rank
Kaisa Lehtonen	Women's	Did not start						

== Volleyball ==
=== Beach ===
Athlete	Event	Preliminary round				Elimination round	Round of 16	Quarterfinals	Semifinals	Finals	Rank
Athlete	Event	Opposition Score	Opposition Score	Opposition Score	Standing	Opposition Score	Opposition Score	Opposition Score	Opposition Score	Opposition Score	Rank
Riikka Lehtonen; Taru Lahti	Women's	Ribera Boter/Fernández Navarro (ESP); 2–0 W	Shalayeuskaya/Siakretava (BLR); 2–0 W	Gioria/Momoli (ITA); 2–0 L	1	Bye	Prokopeva/Syrtseva (RUS); 0–2 L	Did not advance			9
Jyrki Nurminen; Pekka Piippo	Men's	Pļaviņš/Regza (LAT); 2–1 L	Eglseer/Müllner (AUT); 2–1 L	Kavalenka/Dziadkou (BLR); 2–1 L	4	Did not advance					25
Emilia Nyström; Erika Nyström	Women's	Karagkouni/Metheniti (GRE); 0–2 W	van Gestel/van der Vlist (NED); 2–0 L	Angelova/Mishonova (BUL); 2–0 W	2	Cunha/Liubymova (AZE); 0–2 L	Did not advance				17

=== Indoor ===
==== Men's tournament ====
===== Roster =====
Head coach: (Finland) Lauri Hakala

#	Name	Date of birth	Height	Weight	Spike	Block	Club
1	Akseli Lankinen	31 August 1997	1.93 m (6 ft 4 in)	75 kg (165 lb)	330 cm (130 in)	315 cm (124 in)	(Finland) Kuortaneen Lentopallo
2	Petteri Penttinen	21 August 1985	1.85 m (6 ft 1 in)	85 kg (187 lb)	325 cm (128 in)	315 cm (124 in)	(Finland) LEKA Volley
3	Tuomas Koppanen	4 October 1993	1.97 m (6 ft 6 in)	85 kg (187 lb)	346 cm (136 in)	324 cm (128 in)	(Finland) Hurrikaani Loimaa
4	Aleksi Mutka	23 March 1995	1.82 m (6 ft 0 in)	68 kg (150 lb)	315 cm (124 in)	300 cm (120 in)	(Finland) Tampereen Isku-Volley
5	Toni Kankaanpää (C)	18 March 1984	1.94 m (6 ft 4 in)	90 kg (200 lb)	342 cm (135 in)	318 cm (125 in)	(Finland) Korson Veto
6	Lauri Jylhä	2 August 1996	1.94 m (6 ft 4 in)	82 kg (181 lb)	348 cm (137 in)	325 cm (128 in)	(Finland) Kokkolan Tiikerit
7	Ossi Rumpunen	18 April 1989	1.88 m (6 ft 2 in)	87 kg (192 lb)	337 cm (133 in)	315 cm (124 in)	(Finland) Raision Loimu
9	Antti Leppälä	8 May 1992	1.95 m (6 ft 5 in)	94 kg (207 lb)	344 cm (135 in)	320 cm (130 in)	(Finland) Kokkolan Tiikerit
10	Antti Vallin	5 April 1994	2.06 m (6 ft 9 in)	103 kg (227 lb)	354 cm (139 in)	328 cm (129 in)	(Finland) Korson Veto
11	Markus Kaurto	31 August 1993	1.95 m (6 ft 5 in)	88 kg (194 lb)	345 cm (136 in)	322 cm (127 in)	(Finland) Perungan Pojat
12	Joni Savimäki	28 January 1991	1.91 m (6 ft 3 in)	90 kg (200 lb)	345 cm (136 in)	325 cm (128 in)	(Finland) Pohjois-Karjalan Liiga-Riento
14	Karl Külaots	28 December 1993	1.97 m (6 ft 6 in)	84 kg (185 lb)	345 cm (136 in)	320 cm (130 in)	(Finland) Korson Veto

===== Preliminary round =====
====== Matches ======
All times are Azerbaijan Summer Time (UTC+05:00).

Date	Time		Score		Set 1	Set 2	Set 3	Set 4	Set 5	Total	Report
14 Jun	17:40	Azerbaijan	2–3	Finland	25–22	25–21	18–25	18–25	13–15	99–108	Report
16 Jun	11:00	Finland	0–3	France	24–26	23–25	23–25			70–76	Report
18 Jun	14:30	Finland	0–3	Turkey	14–25	16–25	13–25			43–75	Report
20 Jun	14:30	Serbia	3–0	Finland	25–16	28–26	25–20			78–62	Report
22 Jun	09:00	Poland	3–0	Finland	25–21	25–20	25–10			75–51	Report

====== Pool results ======
Pos	Team	Pld	W	L	Pts	SW	SL	SR	SPW	SPL	SPR	Qualification
1	Poland	5	5	0	12	15	6	2.500	464	401	1.157	Quarterfinals
2	France	5	4	1	12	14	5	2.800	431	381	1.131	Quarterfinals
3	Turkey	5	3	2	9	11	9	1.222	449	414	1.085	Quarterfinals
4	Serbia	5	2	3	8	11	9	1.222	430	419	1.026	Quarterfinals
5	Finland	5	1	4	2	3	14	0.214	334	403	0.829	
6	Azerbaijan	5	0	5	2	4	15	0.267	356	446	0.798	

Finland did not advance to quarterfinals and final rank was 9th.

== Wrestling ==
Athlete	Event	Qualifications	1/8 Finals	Quarterfinals	Semifinals	Repechage 1	Repechage 2	Final / BM	Rank
Athlete	Event	Opposition Result	Opposition Result	Opposition Result	Opposition Result	Opposition Result	Opposition Result	Opposition Result	Rank
Jani Haapamäki	Men's Greco-Roman 59 kg	Fris (SRB); 3–1 W PP	Menekse (GER); 0–4 L ST	Did not advance					11
Jere Heino	Men's freestyle 97 kg	Bye	Lagodskis (LAT); 1–3 L PP	Did not advance					15
Ville Heino	Men's freestyle 86 kg	Ianulov (MDA); 1–3 L PP	Did not advance			Hushtyn (BLR); 1–3 L PP	Did not advance		13
Marko Kivimäki	Men's Greco-Roman 85 kg	Szabo (HUN); 3–1 L PP	Did not advance						13
Tuomas Lahti	Men's Greco-Roman 98 kg	Konera (POL); 1–3 W PP	İldem (TUR); 1–3 L PP	Did not advance					10
Petteri Martikainen	Men's freestyle 65 kg	Bye	Castillo Silveira (ESP); 1–3 L PP	Did not advance					14
Petra Olli	Women's freestyle 63 kg	—N/a	Lazinskaya (RUS); 0–5 L VB	Did not advance		—N/a	Grigorjeva (LAT); 0–5 L VB	Did not advance	14
Henri Selenius	Men's freestyle 74 kg	Bye	Demirtaş (TUR); 0–4 L ST	Did not advance		Bye	Hasanov (AZE); 0–4 L ST	Did not advance	21
Henri Välimäki	Men's Greco-Roman 75 kg	Yanakiev (BUL); 4–0 L ST	Did not advance						28
Tero Välimäki	Men's Greco-Roman 66 kg	Dem'yankov (UKR); 3–1 L PP	Did not advance						18
Tiina Ylinen	Women's freestyle 53 kg	Hocková (CZE); 3–1 W PP	Shushko (BLR); 0–5 L VT	Did not advance					10

== Links ==
- Finland at the official site
