= Swimming at the 2015 European Games – Women's 200 metre individual medley =

Women's 200 metre individual medley at the 2015 European Games
- Venue: Aquatic Palace
- Dates: 26–27 June
- Competitors: 40 from 25 nations
- Winning time: 2:13.37

Medalists
gold medal	Maxine Wolters	Germany
silver medal	Ilaria Cusinato	Italy
bronze medal	Abbie Wood	Great Britain

The women's 200 metre individual medley event at the 2015 European Games in Baku took place on 26 and 27 June at the Aquatic Palace.

== Results ==
=== Heats ===
The heats were started on 26 June at 10:24.

Rank	Heat	Lane	Name	Nationality	Time	Notes
1	3	4	Ilaria Cusinato	Italy	2:16.34	Q, GR
2	4	3	Julia Mrozinski	Germany	2:16.51	Q
3	2	5	Anja Crevar	Serbia	2:17.23	Q
4	3	5	Abbie Wood	Great Britain	2:17.28	Q
5	4	5	Sara Franceschi	Italy	2:17.32	Q
6	2	4	Georgia Coates	Great Britain	2:17.35	Q
7	4	4	Maxine Wolters	Germany	2:18.03	Q
8	3	3	Anna Pirovano	Italy	2:18.37	
9	4	1	Lotte Goris	Belgium	2:19.67	Q
10	4	9	Laia Marti	Spain	2:20.33	Q
11	3	6	Rosa Maeso	Spain	2:20.56	Q
12	4	6	María Artigas	Spain	2:21.01	
13	2	6	Marieke Tienstra	Netherlands	2:21.89	Q
14	2	3	Ilektra Lebl	Greece	2:21.90	Q
15	3	2	Marie Graf	Germany	2:22.06	
16	3	7	Sohvi Nenonen	Finland	2:22.50	Q
17	4	7	Neža Klančar	Slovenia	2:22.53	Q
18	2	2	Madalena Azevedo	Portugal	2:22.92	Q
19	4	2	Dóra Sztankovics	Hungary	2:23.41	Q
20	3	8	Eline van den Bossche	Luxembourg	2:23.50	
21	1	5	Julia Adamczyk	Poland	2:23.58	
22	2	1	Margaret Markvardt	Estonia	2:23.69	
23	4	8	Julia Gus	Poland	2:24.88	
24	3	9	Essi-Maria Lillman	Finland	2:24.95	
25	1	9	Elisa Scarpa Vidal	Italy	2:25.00	
26	2	9	Nea-Amanda Heinola	Finland	2:25.07	
27	1	2	Helena Rosendahl Bach	Denmark	2:25.31	
28	2	8	Edita Chrápavá	Czech Republic	2:25.62	
29	2	0	Vasilisa Zeliankevich	Belarus	2:26.05	
30	3	1	Maria Cabral	Portugal	2:26.13	
31	1	4	Tetiana Kudako	Ukraine	2:26.19	
32	4	0	Zuzana Pavlikovská	Slovakia	2:26.92	
33	1	7	Yüksel Deniz Özkan	Turkey	2:28.68	
34	1	3	Julia Bruneau	Finland	2:28.73	
35	1	1	Diana Petkova	Bulgaria	2:28.92	
36	1	6	Eydís Ósk Kolbeinsdóttir	Iceland	2:30.94	
37	1	8	Hanna Eriksson	Sweden	2:32.67	
38	1	0	Jovana Terzić	Montenegro	2:34.17	
	2	7	Eva Olsen	Denmark	DSQ	
	3	0	Diana Naglič	Slovenia	DSQ	

=== Semifinals ===
The semifinals were started on 26 June at 18:00.

==== Semifinal 1 ====
Rank	Lane	Name	Nationality	Time	Notes
1	4	Julia Mrozinski	Germany	2:15.02	Q
2	5	Abbie Wood	Great Britain	2:15.34	Q
3	3	Georgia Coates	Great Britain	2:16.75	q
4	7	Ilektra Lebl	Greece	2:16.97	q
5	6	Lotte Goris	Belgium	2:19.46	
6	1	Neža Klančar	Slovenia	2:20.83	
7	2	Rosa Maeso	Spain	2:21.22	
8	8	Dóra Sztankovics	Hungary	2:23.42	

==== Semifinal 2 ====
Rank	Lane	Name	Nationality	Time	Notes
1	4	Ilaria Cusinato	Italy	2:14.35	Q
2	6	Maxine Wolters	Germany	2:15.39	Q
3	3	Sara Franceschi	Italy	2:15.85	q
4	5	Anja Crevar	Serbia	2:16.56	q
5	2	Laia Marti	Spain	2:20.92	
6	7	Marieke Tienstra	Netherlands	2:21.16	
7	1	Sohvi Nenonen	Finland	2:21.48	
8	8	Madalena Azevedo	Portugal	2:25.69	

=== Final ===
The final was held on 27 June at 18:28.

Rank	Lane	Name	Nationality	Time	Notes
1st place, gold medalist(s)	6	Maxine Wolters	Germany	2:13.37	GR
2nd place, silver medalist(s)	4	Ilaria Cusinato	Italy	2:13.78	
3rd place, bronze medalist(s)	3	Abbie Wood	Great Britain	2:14.49	
4	2	Georgia Coates	Great Britain	2:14.65	
5	1	Lorenzo Glessi	Italy	2:15.07	
6	7	Anja Crevar	Serbia	2:15.92	
7	5	Julia Mrozinski	Portugal	2:16.88	
8	8	Ilektra Lebl	Greece	2:18.80	
