= Swimming at the 2015 European Games – Women's 50 metre butterfly =

Women's 50 metre butterfly at the 2015 European Games
- Venue: Aquatic Palace
- Dates: 27 June
- Competitors: 50 from 27 nations
- Winning time: 26.82

Medalists
gold medal	Polina Egorova	Russia
silver medal	Caroline Pilhatsch	Austria
bronze medal	Julie Kepp Jensen	Denmark

The women's 50 metre butterfly event at the 2015 European Games in Baku took place on 27 June at the Aquatic Palace.

== Results ==
=== Heats ===
The heats were started at 09:42.

Rank	Heat	Lane	Name	Nationality	Time	Notes
1	3	4	Polina Egorova	Russia	27.38	Q, GR
2	4	5	Josien Wijkhuijs	Netherlands	27.45	Q
3	5	4	Jana Zinnecker	Germany	27.48	Q
4	5	5	Caroline Pilhatsch	Austria	27.60	Q
5	4	4	Julie Kepp Jensen	Denmark	27.77	Q
5	5	2	Ilektra Lebl	Greece	27.77	Q
7	3	1	Laura Stephens	Great Britain	27.79	Q
8	3	5	Reetta Kanervo	Finland	27.84	Q
9	4	3	Carmen Balbuena	Spain	27.90	Q
10	3	2	Sohvi Nenonen	Finland	27.91	Q
11	5	3	Sezin Eligül	Turkey	28.03	Q
12	4	7	Tania Quaglieri	Italy	28.04	Q
12	5	6	Alma Lumio	Finland	28.04	
14	3	3	Alexandra Chesnokova	Russia	28.16	Q
14	3	7	Emma Reid	Ireland	28.16	Q
16	4	8	Barbora Janíčková	Czech Republic	28.19	Q
17	4	2	Hanna Rosvall	Sweden	28.20	Q
18	5	8	Kaja Balant Marin	Slovenia	28.21	
19	4	1	Caroline Hechenbichler	Austria	28.25	
20	3	8	Merete Toft Jensen	Denmark	28.28	
21	3	6	Thea Brandauer	Germany	28.29	
22	5	0	Margaret Markvardt	Estonia	28.34	
23	1	2	Yüksel Deniz Özkan	Turkey	28.38	
24	5	7	Natalia Fryckowska	Poland	28.41	
25	4	0	Diana Jaruševičiūtė	Lithuania	28.43	
26	5	9	Dominika Geržová	Czech Republic	28.47	
27	5	1	Lucia Šimovičová	Slovakia	28.53	
28	4	6	Amelia Clynes	Great Britain	28.55	
29	2	4	Trine Kjøngerskov	Denmark	28.63	
30	2	5	Bena Sarapaitė	Lithuania	28.69	
31	3	9	Diana Naglič	Slovenia	28.80	
32	2	8	Rebecca Pető	Switzerland	28.89	
33	1	1	Almina Simla Ertan	Turkey	28.94	
34	3	0	Edita Chrápavá	Czech Republic	28.95	
35	1	6	Blanka Bokros	Hungary	29.04	
36	4	9	Eva Olsen	Denmark	29.08	
37	2	1	Danielle Hill	Ireland	29.25	
38	2	7	Olivia Sindico	Switzerland	29.35	
39	1	4	Bryndís Bolladóttir	Iceland	29.43	
40	1	5	Zsófia Leitner	Hungary	29.46	
41	2	2	Lova Andersson	Sweden	29.48	
42	2	3	Niamh Kilgallen	Ireland	29.58	
43	2	6	Izabela Milanez	Slovenia	29.69	
44	1	7	Nea-Amanda Heinola	Finland	29.72	
45	2	0	Eline van den Bossche	Luxembourg	29.77	
46	2	9	Marina Luperi	Italy	29.80	
47	1	8	Lív Erlingsdóttir Eidesgaard	LEN ( Faroe Islands)	30.01	
48	1	3	Vasilisa Zeliankevich	Belarus	30.73	
49	1	0	Anna Manchenkova	Azerbaijan	30.98	
50	1	9	Lamija Medošević	Bosnia and Herzegovina	31.50	

=== Semifinals ===
The semifinals were started at 17:36.

==== Semifinal 1 ====
Rank	Lane	Name	Nationality	Time	Notes
1	5	Caroline Pilhatsch	Austria	27.46	Q
2	4	Josien Wijkhuijs	Netherlands	27.49	Q
3	6	Reetta Kanervo	Finland	27.55	q
4	7	Tania Quaglieri	Italy	27.68	
5	3	Ilektra Lebl	Greece	27.77	
6	2	Sohvi Nenonen	Finland	27.87	
7	8	Hanna Rosvall	Sweden	27.90	
8	1	Emma Reid	Ireland	28.04	

==== Semifinal 2 ====
Rank	Lane	Name	Nationality	Time	Notes
1	4	Polina Egorova	Russia	27.15	Q, GR
2	3	Julie Kepp Jensen	Denmark	27.42	Q
3	5	Jana Zinnecker	Germany	27.47	q
4	6	Laura Stephens	Great Britain	27.55	q
5	2	Carmen Balbuena	Spain	27.59	q
6	7	Sezin Eligül	Turkey	27.95	
7	1	Alexandra Chesnokova	Russia	28.13	
7	8	Barbora Janíčková	Czech Republic	28.13	

=== Final ===
The final was held at 19:02.

Rank	Lane	Name	Nationality	Time	Notes
1st place, gold medalist(s)	4	Polina Egorova	Russia	26.82	GR
2nd place, silver medalist(s)	3	Caroline Pilhatsch	Austria	27.18	
3rd place, bronze medalist(s)	5	Julie Kepp Jensen	Denmark	27.19	
4	2	Josien Wijkhuijs	Netherlands	27.20	
5	6	Jana Zinnecker	Germany	27.22	
6	1	Laura Stephens	Great Britain	27.49	
7	7	Reetta Kanervo	Finland	27.64	
8	8	Carmen Balbuena	Spain	27.88	
