= Swimming at the 2015 European Games – Women's 100 metre breaststroke =

Women's 100 metre breaststroke at the 2015 European Games
- Venue: Aquatic Palace
- Dates: 26–27 June
- Competitors: 35 from 29 nations
- Winning time: 1:07.71

Medalists
gold medal	Maria Astashkina	Russia
silver medal	Giulia Verona	Italy
bronze medal	Daria Chikunova	Russia

The women's 100 metre breaststroke event at the 2015 European Games in Baku took place on 26 and 27 June at the Aquatic Palace.

== Results ==
=== Heats ===
The heats were started on 26 June at 10:55.

Rank	Heat	Lane	Name	Nationality	Time	Notes
1	4	4	Maria Astashkina	Russia	1:08.67	Q
2	3	4	Daria Chikunova	Russia	1:09.60	Q
3	2	4	Giulia Verona	Italy	1:09.93	Q
4	2	5	Emma Cain	Great Britain	1:10.79	Q
5	4	5	Layla Black	Great Britain	1:10.92	Q
6	3	5	Gülşen Samancı	Turkey	1:11.33	Q
7	2	3	Ariel Braathen	Norway	1:11.43	Q
8	2	9	Josefine Pedersen	Denmark	1:11.50	Q
9	3	6	Nolwenn Hervé	France	1:11.59	Q
10	4	7	Laura Kelsch	Germany	1:11.63	Q
11	2	2	Raquel Pereira	Portugal	1:11.84	Q
12	4	2	Paula García	Spain	1:11.85	Q
13	3	3	Tara Vovk	Slovenia	1:11.92	Q
14	2	6	Lise Michels	Belgium	1:12.09	Q
15	2	8	Viktoryia Mikhalap	Belarus	1:12.30	Q
16	3	7	Tes Schouten	Netherlands	1:12.31	Q
17	4	0	Agnė Šeleikaitė	Lithuania	1:12.54	
18	4	1	Sini Koivu	Finland	1:12.55	
19	3	9	Zsófia Leitner	Hungary	1:12.86	
20	2	1	Sara Wallberg	Sweden	1:12.90	
21	3	1	Phillis Range	Germany	1:13.07	
22	4	9	Mona McSharry	Ireland	1:13.20	
23	1	5	Annabelle Schwaiger	Austria	1:13.33	
24	4	3	Alexandra Vinicenco	Moldova	1:13.59	
25	3	8	Mila Medić	Serbia	1:13.90	
26	4	8	Niamh Kilgallen	Ireland	1:14.03	
27	4	6	Moona Koski	Finland	1:14.21	
28	3	0	Dana Kolidzeja	Latvia	1:14.43	
29	2	0	Eleni Kontogeorgou	Greece	1:14.65	
30	3	2	Neža Klančar	Slovenia	1:14.85	
31	1	3	Rebecca Pető	Switzerland	1:14.89	
32	1	4	Yuliya Gnidenko	Ukraine	1:15.22	
33	1	6	Ásbjørg Hjelm	LEN ( Faroe Islands)	1:15.34	
34	1	2	Lara Bábska	Slovakia	1:15.76	
35	1	7	Melisa Zhdrella	Kosovo	1:22.10	
	2	7	Abbie Wood	Great Britain	DNS	

=== Semifinals ===
The semifinals were started on 26 June at 18:21.

==== Semifinal 1 ====
Rank	Lane	Name	Nationality	Time	Notes
1	4	Daria Chikunova	Russia	1:09.65	Q
2	5	Emma Cain	Great Britain	1:10.21	Q
3	7	Paula García	Spain	1:11.58	q
4	3	Gülşen Samancı	Turkey	1:11.72	qSO
4	6	Josefine Pedersen	Denmark	1:11.72	qSO
6	2	Laura Kelsch	Germany	1:11.73	
7	1	Lise Michels	Belgium	1:12.30	
8	8	Tes Schouten	Netherlands	1:12.78	

==== Semifinal 2 ====
Rank	Lane	Name	Nationality	Time	Notes
1	4	Maria Astashkina	Russia	1:07.88	Q, GR
2	5	Giulia Verona	Italy	1:09.44	Q
3	3	Layla Black	Great Britain	1:09.84	q
4	1	Tara Vovk	Slovenia	1:11.50	q
5	2	Nolwenn Hervé	France	1:11.75	
6	6	Ariel Braathen	Norway	1:11.99	
7	7	Raquel Pereira	Portugal	1:12.02	
8	8	Viktoryia Mikhalap	Belarus	1:12.19	

=== Swim-off ===
Rank	Lane	Name	Nationality	Time	Notes
1	4	Gülşen Samancı	Turkey	1:10.80	Q
2	5	Josefine Pedersen	Denmark	1:11.05	

=== Final ===
The final was held on 27 June at 18:09.

Rank	Lane	Name	Nationality	Time	Notes
1st place, gold medalist(s)	4	Maria Astashkina	Russia	1:07.71	GR
2nd place, silver medalist(s)	5	Giulia Verona	Italy	1:08.61	
3rd place, bronze medalist(s)	3	Daria Chikunova	Russia	1:09.02	
4	6	Layla Black	Great Britain	1:09.26	
5	2	Emma Cain	Great Britain	1:10.42	
6	1	Paula García	Spain	1:11.01	
7	7	Tara Vovk	Slovenia	1:11.56	
8	8	Gülşen Samancı	Turkey	1:12.34	
