= Swimming at the 2015 European Games – Women's 50 metre breaststroke =

Women's 50 metre breaststroke at the 2015 European Games
- Venue: Aquatic Palace
- Dates: 23 June
- Competitors: 34 from 28 nations
- Winning time: 31.58

Medalists
gold medal	Maria Astashkina	Russia
silver medal	Laura Kelsch	Germany
bronze medal	Nolwenn Hervé	France

The women's 50 metre breaststroke event at the 2015 European Games in Baku took place on 23 June at the Aquatic Palace.

== Results ==
=== Heats ===
The heats were started at 09:30.

Rank	Heat	Lane	Name	Nationality	Time	Notes
1	4	4	Maria Astashkina	Russia	31.84	Q, GR
2	4	5	Gülşen Samancı	Turkey	32.10	Q
3	3	3	Laura Kelsch	Germany	32.27	Q
4	3	4	Nolwenn Hervé	France	32.45	Q
5	3	6	Josefine Pedersen	Denmark	32.46	Q
6	2	4	Giulia Verona	Italy	32.49	Q
7	4	7	Agnė Šeleikaitė	Lithuania	32.52	Q
8	1	5	Emma Cain	Great Britain	32.58	Q
9	2	3	Layla Black	Great Britain	32.63	Q
10	2	5	Dana Kolidzeja	Latvia	32.68	Q
11	2	6	Tara Vovk	Slovenia	32.71	Q
12	3	5	Daria Chikunova	Russia	32.73	Q
13	4	6	Ariel Braathen	Norway	32.82	Q
14	3	8	Mona McSharry	Ireland	32.87	Q
15	2	2	Paula García	Spain	32.88	Q
16	3	2	Tes Schouten	Netherlands	32.98	Q
17	3	0	Sini Koivu	Finland	33.51	
18	4	8	Raquel Pereira	Portugal	33.52	
19	4	3	Alexandra Vinicenco	Moldova	33.71	
20	2	7	Phillis Range	Germany	33.73	
21	2	8	Sara Wallberg	Sweden	33.75	
22	2	1	Mila Medić	Serbia	33.77	
22	3	7	Moona Koski	Finland	33.77	
24	4	2	Edita Chrápavá	Czech Republic	33.81	
25	3	1	Rebecca Pető	Switzerland	33.86	
26	4	0	Lara Bábska	Slovakia	33.92	
27	4	1	Niamh Kilgallen	Ireland	34.02	
28	2	9	Zsófia Leitner	Hungary	34.05	
29	2	0	Viktoryia Mikhalap	Belarus	34.13	
30	1	3	Eleni Kontogeorgou	Greece	34.23	
31	4	9	Yuliya Gnidenko	Ukraine	34.81	
32	3	9	Ásbjørg Hjelm	LEN ( Faroe Islands)	35.10	
33	1	4	Tetiana Kudako	Ukraine	35.56	
34	1	6	Melisa Zhdrella	Kosovo	37.51	

=== Semifinals ===
The semifinals were started at 17:30.

==== Semifinal 1 ====
Rank	Lane	Name	Nationality	Time	Notes
1	4	Gülşen Samancı	Turkey	31.98	Q
2	5	Nolwenn Hervé	France	32.07	Q
3	3	Giulia Verona	Italy	32.37	q, WD
4	2	Dana Kolidzeja	Latvia	32.45	
5	7	Daria Chikunova	Russia	32.47	
6	6	Emma Cain	Great Britain	32.64	
7	8	Tes Schouten	Netherlands	32.90	
8	1	Mona McSharry	Ireland	33.00	

==== Semifinal 2 ====
Rank	Lane	Name	Nationality	Time	Notes
1	4	Maria Astashkina	Russia	31.47	Q, GR
2	5	Laura Kelsch	Germany	31.94	Q
3	2	Layla Black	Great Britain	32.30	q
4	6	Agnė Šeleikaitė	Lithuania	32.40	q
5	7	Tara Vovk	Slovenia	32.42	q
6	3	Josefine Pedersen	Denmark	32.44	q
7	1	Ariel Braathen	Norway	32.90	
8	8	Paula García	Spain	33.00	

=== Final ===
The final was held on at 19:08.

Rank	Lane	Name	Nationality	Time	Notes
1st place, gold medalist(s)	4	Maria Astashkina	Russia	31.58	
2nd place, silver medalist(s)	5	Laura Kelsch	Germany	31.87	
3rd place, bronze medalist(s)	6	Nolwenn Hervé	France	32.08	
4	3	Gülşen Samancı	Turkey	32.14	
4	2	Layla Black	Great Britain	32.21	
6	8	Tara Vovk	Slovenia	32.29	
7	7	Josefine Pedersen	Denmark	32.39	
8	1	Agnė Šeleikaitė	Lithuania	32.45	
