= Sweden at the 2015 European Games =

- IOC code: SWE
- NOC: Swedish Olympic Committee
- Website: www.sok.se

in Baku, Azerbaijan 12 – 28 June 2015
- Competitors: 76 in 16 sports
- Flag bearer: Sofia Mattsson
- Medals Ranked 23rd: Gold 2 Silver 2 Bronze 3 Total 7

European Games appearances (overview)
- 2015; 2019; 2023; 2027

Sweden competed at the 2015 European Games, in Baku, Azerbaijan from 12 to 28 June 2015. All Swedish athletes were presented on 29 April 2015.

== Medalists ==
Medal	Name	Sport	Event	Date
Gold	Sofia Mattsson	Wrestling	Women's freestyle 55 kg	15 June
Gold	Petter Menning	Canoe sprint	Men's K1-200 metres	16 June
Silver	Stefan Nilsson	Shooting	Men's skeet	21 June
Silver	Anna Laurell	Boxing	Women's 75 kg	25 June
Bronze	Lisa Nordén	Triathlon	Women's individual	13 June
Bronze	Nikita Glasnović	Taekwondo	Women's 57 kg	17 June
Bronze	Elin Johansson	Taekwondo	Women's 67 kg	18 June

== Archery ==
Athlete	Event	Ranking round		Round of 64	Round of 32	Round of 16	Quarterfinals	Semifinals	Final / BM	
Athlete	Event	Score	Seed	Opposition Score	Opposition Score	Opposition Score	Opposition Score	Opposition Score	Opposition Score	Rank
Andreas Skalberg	Men's individual	648	38	Weiss (GER); L 2–6	Did not advance					33

== Boxing ==
Men

Athlete	Event	Round of 32	Round of 16	Quarterfinals	Semifinals	Final	
Athlete	Event	Opposition Result	Opposition Result	Opposition Result	Opposition Result	Opposition Result	Rank
Clarence Goyeram	64 kg	Khatuev (NOR); W 3–0	Maxwell (GBR); W 2–1	Petrov (UKR); L 1–2	Did not advance		
Leon Chartoi	75 kg	Voitaliuk (UKR); L 0–3	Did not advance				
Gabriel Richards	91 kg	Nikolic (AUT); W 3–0	Filipi (CRO); L 1–2	Did not advance			

Women

Athlete	Event	Round of 16	Quarterfinals	Semifinals	Final	
Athlete	Event	Opposition Result	Opposition Result	Opposition Result	Opposition Result	Rank
Ida Lundblad	60 kg	Başar (TUR); W 3–0	Taylor (IRL); L 0–3	Did not advance		
Agnes Alexiusson	64 kg	Alberti (ITA); L 0–2	Did not advance			
Anna Laurell Nash	75 kg	Nagy (HUN); W 3–0	Kebikava (BLR); W 3–0	Fidura (POL); W 2–1	Fontijn (NED); L 0–3	2nd place, silver medalist(s)

== Canoe sprint ==
In men's K1 200 metres, Petter Menning eventually finished in 2nd place behind Miklós Dudás of Hungary, but the original gold medalist was later disqualified due to doping violations.

Men

Athlete	Event	Heats		Semifinals		Finals	
Athlete	Event	Time	Rank	Time	Rank	Time	Rank
Petter Menning	K1 200 m	34.822	1 QF	BYE		35.576	1st place, gold medalist(s)
Christian Svanqvist; Erik Svensson	K2 200 m	33.769	6 QS	31.905	4	Did not advance	

Women

Athlete	Event	Heats		Semifinals		Finals	
Athlete	Event	Time	Rank	Time	Rank	Time	Rank
Linnea Stensils	K1 200 m	41.328	3 QS	40.137	3 QF	42.179	7
Klara Andersson; Karin Johansson; Linnea Stensils; Moa Wikberg	K4 500 m	1:38.337	6 QS	1:31.946	4	Did not advance	

== Cycling ==
=== Mountain biking ===
Athlete	Event	Time	Rank
Emil Lindgren	Men's cross-country	1:51:00	20
Matthias Wengelin	Men's cross-country	1:48:17	15
Jenny Rissveds	Women's cross-country	1:36:22	8

== Diving ==
Women

Athlete	Event	Qualification		Final	
Athlete	Event	Points	Rank	Points	Rank
Ellen Ek	3 metre springboard	353.30	14	Did not advance	
Ellen Ek	Platform	347.50	6 Q	330.5	9
Frida Källgren	1 metre springboard	365.30	9 Q	370.30	12
Frida Källgren	3 metre springboard	409.30	7 Q	392.55	9

== Fencing ==
Women

Athlete	Event	Pool round	Rank	Round of 32	Round of 16	Quarterfinal	Semifinal	Final / BM	
Athlete	Event	Opposition Score	Rank	Opposition Score	Opposition Score	Opposition Score	Opposition Score	Opposition Score	Seed
Emma Samuelsson	Individual épée	Beljajeva (EST); L 4–5 Nelip (POL); L 3–5 Branza (ROU); L 2–5 Bucocki (HUN); W 5–2 Khudaverdiyeva (AZE); W 5–2 Ciparova (SVK); W 5–2	17 Q	Kirpu (EST); L 11–15	Did not advance				20

== Gymnastics ==
=== Trampoline ===
Men

Athlete	Event	Qualification		Final	
Athlete	Event	Points	Rank	Points	Rank
Jonas Nordfors	Individual	91.955	20	Did not advance	
Måns Åberg	Individual	92.005	19	Did not advance	
Jonas Nordfors; Måns Åberg	Synchronized	82.300	6 Q	45.200	5

== Judo ==
Men

Athlete	Event	Round of 64	Round of 32	Round of 16	Quarterfinals	Semifinals	Repechage	Final / BM	
Athlete	Event	Opposition Result	Opposition Result	Opposition Result	Opposition Result	Opposition Result	Opposition Result	Opposition Result	Rank
Tommy Macias	73 kg	BYE	Kovačević (SRB); L 0000–1000	Did not advance					
Robin Pacek	81 kg	Cetic (SLO); W 0100–0000	Pietri (FRA); L 0000–0000	Did not advance					
Joakim Dvärby	90 kg	BYE	Zgank (SLO); L 0000–0010	Did not advance					
Marcus Nyman	90 kg	BYE	Toth (HUN); L 0000–0000	Did not advance					
Martin Pacek	100 kg	—N/a	Borodavko (LAT); L 0000–0000	Did not advance					

Women

Athlete	Event	Round of 32	Round of 16	Quarterfinals	Semifinals	Repechage	Final / BM	
Athlete	Event	Opposition Result	Opposition Result	Opposition Result	Opposition Result	Opposition Result	Opposition Result	Rank
Anna Bernholm	63 kg	Schlesinger (GBR); L 0000–0010	Did not advance					
Mia Hermansson	63 kg	Bezzina (MLT); W 1000–0000	Howell (GBR); W 0100–0000	Gerbi (ISR); L 0000–0010	Did not advance	Franssen (NED); L 0000–1000	Did not advance	7

== Karate ==
Women

Athlete	Event	Pool round	Rank	Semifinal	Final / BM	
Athlete	Event	Opposition Score	Rank	Opposition Score	Opposition Score	Rank
Hana Antunović	+68 kg	Ait Ibrahim (FRA); D 1–1	2 Q	Hosaoglu (TUR); L 2–3	Zaytseva (RUS); L 1–2	4
Hana Antunović	+68 kg	Martinovic (CRO); L 1–2	2 Q	Hosaoglu (TUR); L 2–3	Zaytseva (RUS); L 1–2	4
Hana Antunović	+68 kg	Samadli (AZE); W 9–1	2 Q	Hosaoglu (TUR); L 2–3	Zaytseva (RUS); L 1–2	4

== Shooting ==
Men

Athlete	Event	Qualification		Semifinal		Final	
Athlete	Event	Points	Rank	Points	Rank	Points	Rank
Sam Andersson	50 m rifle prone	605.6	35	—N/a		Did not advance	
Håkan Dahlby	Double trap	139	8	Did not advance			
Stefan Nilsson	Skeet	122	6 Q	14	2 QG	14	2nd place, silver medalist(s)

Women

Athlete	Event	Qualification		Semifinal		Final	
Athlete	Event	Points	Rank	Points	Rank	Points	Rank
Lotten Johansson	50 m rifle three positions	566	30	—N/a		Did not advance	
Therese Lundqvist	Skeet	66	15	Did not advance			

Mixed

Athlete	Event	Qualification		Semifinal		Final	
Athlete	Event	Points	Rank	Points	Rank	Points	Rank
Stefan Nilsson; Therese Lundqvist	Skeet	88	9	Did not advance			

== Swimming ==
Men

Athlete	Event	Heat		Semifinal		Final	
Athlete	Event	Time	Rank	Time	Rank	Time	Rank
Gustaf Dahlman	200 m freestyle	1:57.14	45	Did not advance			
Gustaf Dahlman	400 m freestyle	4:07.43	43	—N/a		Did not advance	
Oskar Eriksson	100 m backstroke	57.22	=21	Did not advance			
Oskar Eriksson	200 m backstroke	2:03.67	12 Q	2:03.34	13	Did not advance	
Oskar Eriksson	200 m individual medley	2:05.99	16 Q	2:05.72	15	Did not advance	
Oskar Eriksson	400 m individual medley	4:37.71	35	—N/a		Did not advance	
Daniel Forndal	50 m freestyle	23.82	=32	Did not advance			
Daniel Forndal	100 m freestyle	51.05	=13 Q	51.22	14	Did not advance	
Daniel Forndal	200 m freestyle	1:53.58	27	Did not advance			
Petter Fredriksson	50 m backstroke	26.50	12 Q	26.62	12	Did not advance	
Petter Fredriksson	100 m backstroke	56.42	9 Q	56.38	14	Did not advance	
Petter Fredriksson	200 m backstroke	2:02.08	7 Q	2:01.51	7 Q	2:01.20	6
Petter Fredriksson	200 m individual medley	2:07.19	22	Did not advance			
Filip Grimberg	50 m freestyle	24.27	49	Did not advance			
Filip Grimberg	100 m freestyle	52.02	=40	Did not advance			
Filip Grimberg	200 m freestyle	1:54.65	33	Did not advance			
Filip Grimberg	400 m freestyle	4:01.29	29	—N/a		Did not advance	
Victor Johansson	200 m freestyle	Did not start		Did not advance			
Victor Johansson	400 m freestyle	3:59.05	24	—N/a		Did not advance	
Victor Johansson	800 m freestyle	—N/a				8:19.67	16
Victor Johansson	1500 m freestyle	—N/a				16:03.41	19
Henry Kerman	50 m butterfly	25.93	49	Did not advance			
Henry Kerman	100 m butterfly	57.38	44	Did not advance			
Henry Kerman	200 m butterfly	2:07.77	27	Did not advance			
Markus Malm	400 m freestyle	4:09.08	46	—N/a		Did not advance	
Markus Malm	100 m butterfly	56.25	29	Did not advance			
Markus Malm	200 m butterfly	2:03.09	15 Q	2:03.36	14	Did not advance	
Teodor Widerberg	50 m breaststroke	29.52	27	Did not advance			
Teodor Widerberg	100 m breaststroke	1:05.11	29	Did not advance			
Teodor Widerberg	200 m breaststroke	2:23.75	28	Did not advance			
Teodor Widerberg	50 m butterfly	25.70	41	Did not advance			
Gustaf Dahlman; Daniel Forndal; Filip Grimberg; Victor Johansson	4x200 m freestyle relay	7:28.15	4 Q	—N/a		7:28.12	7
Petter Fredriksson; Teodor Widerberg; Markus Malm; Daniel Forndal	4x100 m medley relay	3:47.12	7 Q	—N/a		3:47.33	7

Women

Athlete	Event	Heat		Semifinal		Final	
Athlete	Event	Time	Rank	Time	Rank	Time	Rank
Lova Andersson	50 m backstroke	30.46	26	Did not advance			
Lova Andersson	100 m backstroke	Did not start		Did not advance			
Lova Andersson	50 m butterfly	29.48	41	Did not advance			
Hanna Eriksson	100 m freestyle	1:00.21	56	Did not advance			
Hanna Eriksson	200 m freestyle	2:09.74	46	Did not advance			
Hanna Eriksson	400 m freestyle	4:29.47	30	—N/a		Did not advance	
Hanna Eriksson	200 m individual medley	2:32.67	37	Did not advance			
Hanna Rosvall	200 m backstroke	2:19.41	13 Q	2:18.35	14	Did not advance	
Hanna Rosvall	50 m butterfly	28.20	17 Q	27.90	12	Did not advance	
Hanna Rosvall	100 m butterfly	1:02.24	11 Q	1:01.60	8 Q	1:01.60	8
Sara Wallberg	50 m breaststroke	33.75	21	Did not advance			
Sara Wallberg	100 m breaststroke	1:12.90	20	Did not advance			
Sara Wallberg	200 m breaststroke	2:36.11	13 Q	2:36.59	14	Did not advance	
Lova Andersson; Hanna Eriksson; Hanna Rosvall; Sara Wallberg	4x100 m medley relay	4:22.76	11	—N/a		Did not advance	

== Table tennis ==
Men

Athlete	Event	Round 1	Round 2	Round of 16	Quarterfinals	Semifinals	Final / BM	
Athlete	Event	Opposition Score	Opposition Score	Opposition Score	Opposition Score	Opposition Score	Opposition Score	Rank
Pär Gerell	Singles	Platonov (BLR); W 4–1	Shibaev (RUS); W 4–3	Freitas (POR); L 2–4	Did not advance			=9
Kristian Karlsson	Singles	BYE	Saive (BEL); W 4–1	Apolonia (POR); L 2–4	Did not advance			=9
Pär Gerell; Kristian Karlsson; Jon Persson	Team	—N/a		Ukraine (UKR); W 3–0	Germany (GER); L 2–3	Did not advance		=5

Women

Athlete	Event	Round 1	Round 2	Round of 16	Quarterfinals	Semifinals	Final / BM	
Athlete	Event	Opposition Score	Opposition Score	Opposition Score	Opposition Score	Opposition Score	Opposition Score	Rank
Linda Bergström	Singles	Ordova (SVK); L 2–4	Did not advance					=33
Matilda Ekholm	Singles	Karova (BUL); W 4–0	Samara (ROU); L 2–4	Did not advance				=17
Linda Bergström; Matilda Ekholm; Daniela Moskovits	Team	—N/a		Romania (ROU); W 3–1	Ukraine (UKR); L 0–3	Did not advance		=5

== Taekwondo ==
Women

Athlete	Event	Round of 16	Quarterfinals	Semifinals	Repechage	Bronze medal	Final	
Athlete	Event	Opposition Result	Opposition Result	Opposition Result	Opposition Result	Opposition Result	Opposition Result	Rank
Nikita Glasnović	57 kg	Cunha (POR) W 1–0	Liborio (FRA) W 6–5	Jones (GBR) L 6–7	BYE	Gladović (SRB) W 7–0	Did not advance	3rd place, bronze medalist(s)
Elin Johansson	67 kg	Aboud (IRL) W 14–6	Anić (SLO) W 5–4	Azizova (AZE) L 2–5	BYE	Tetereviatnykova (UKR) W 2–1	Did not advance	3rd place, bronze medalist(s)
Casandra Ikonen	+67 kg	Rados (CRO) L 3–15	Did not advance					=9

== Triathlon ==
Athlete	Event	Swim (1.5 km)	Trans 1	Bike (40 km)	Trans 2	Run (10 km)	Total Time	Rank
Lisa Nordén	Women's	20:37	0:49	1:03:49	0:29	36:02	2:01:46	3rd place, bronze medalist(s)

== Wrestling ==
Men's Greco-Roman

Athlete	Event	Qualification	Round of 16	Quarterfinal	Semifinal	Repechage 1	Repechage 2	Final / BM	
Athlete	Event	Opposition Result	Opposition Result	Opposition Result	Opposition Result	Opposition Result	Opposition Result	Opposition Result	Rank
Frunze Harutyunyan	66 kg	Bernatek (POL); W 3–1	Surkov (RUS); L 0–4	Did not advance		Bjerrehuus (DEN); L 0–4	Did not advance		16
Zakarias Tallroth	71 kg	Hinoveanu (ROU); W 3–0	Korpasi (HUN); L 0–4	Did not advance		BYE	Stäbler (GER); L 1–4	Did not advance	10
Christoffer Nilsson	75 kg	Nemeš (SRB); L 0–3	Did not advance			Russo (ITA); W 5–0	Eisele (GER); L 1–3	Did not advance	10
Alexander Jersgren	80 kg	BYE	Balo (SRB); W 3–0	Çebi (TUR); L 0–3	Did not advance				11
Emil Sandahl	85 kg	BYE	Asps (EST); L 1–3	Did not advance					13
Theodoros Tounousidis	98 kg	Nuriyev (AZE); L 1–3	Did not advance						12
Sebastian Lönnborn	130 kg	BYE	Nabi (EST); L 0–3	Did not advance					13

Women's freestyle

Athlete	Event	Qualification	Round of 16	Quarterfinal	Semifinal	Repechage 1	Repechage 2	Final / BM	
Athlete	Event	Opposition Result	Opposition Result	Opposition Result	Opposition Result	Opposition Result	Opposition Result	Opposition Result	Rank
Fredrika Peterson	53 kg	BYE	Dobre (ROU); L 1–3	Did not advance					13
Sofia Mattsson	55 kg	—N/a	Mertens (GER); W 4–0	Kit (UKR); W 5–0	Sinishin (AZE); W 3–1	BYE		Krawczyk (POL); W 4–1	1st place, gold medalist(s)
Johanna Mattsson	60 kg	—N/a	Sahin (TUR); W 3–1	Herhel (UKR); L 1–3	Did not advance				7
Henna Johansson	63 kg	—N/a	Gambarova (AZE); W 5–0	Hanzlickova (CZE); W 5–0	Lanzinskaia (RUS); L 0–5	BYE		Grigorjeva (LAT); L 1–3	5
Fanny Gradin	69 kg	—N/a	Wilson (HUN); W 4–1	Focken (GER); L 1–4	Did not advance				7
