= Boxing at the 2015 European Games – Women's 64 kg =

Boxing competitions

Women's light welterweight boxing at the 2015 European Games
- Venue: Baku Crystal Hall
- Date: 20–26 June
- Competitors: 12 from 12 nations

Medalists
| gold medal | Elena Savelyeva | Russia |
| silver medal | Valentina Alberti | Italy |
| bronze medal | Sandy Ryan | Great Britain |
| bronze medal | Aneta Rygielska | Poland |

The women's light welterweight 64 kg boxing event at the 2015 European Games in Baku was held from 20 to 26 June at the Baku Crystal Hall.

== Results ==
Round of 16; 20 June
Agnes Alexiusson (SWE) | 0
Valentina Alberti (ITA) | 2
Simona Sitar (ROU) | 0
Aneta Rygielska (POL) | 3
Anastasia Belyakova (RUS) | 2
Martina Schmoranzová (CZE) | 0
Sandy Ryan (GBR) | 3
Cindy Rogge (GER) | 0

Quarterfinals; 23 June
Camilla Jensen (DEN) | 0
Valentina Alberti (ITA) | 3
Aneta Rygielska (POL) | 2
Anaïs Kistler (SUI) | 0
Bianka Nagy (HUN)
Anastasia Belyakova (RUS) | TKO
Sandy Ryan (GBR) | 2
Elena Vystropova (AZE) | 1

Semifinals; 25 June
Valentina Alberti (ITA) | 3
Aneta Rygielska (POL) | 0
Anastasia Belyakova (RUS) | 3
Sandy Ryan (GBR) | 0

Final; 26 June
Valentina Alberti (ITA) | 0
Anastasia Belyakova (RUS) | 3
