= Swimming at the 2015 European Games – Women's 200 metre butterfly =

Women's 200 metre butterfly at the 2015 European Games
- Venue: Aquatic Palace
- Dates: 23–24 June
- Competitors: 25 from 14 nations
- Winning time: 2:11.19

Medalists
gold medal	Julia Mrozinski	Germany
silver medal	Elisa Scarpa Vidal	Italy
bronze medal	Boglárka Bonecz	Hungary

The women's 200 metre butterfly event at the 2015 European Games in Baku took place on 23 and 24 June at the Aquatic Palace.

== Results ==
=== Heats ===
The heats were started on 23 June at 10:35.

Rank	Heat	Lane	Name	Nationality	Time	Notes
1	3	5	Holly Hibbott	Great Britain	2:12.07	Q, GR
2	2	4	Amelia Clynes	Great Britain	2:13.15	Q
3	2	5	Marina Luperi	Italy	2:13.27	Q
4	3	3	Julia Mrozinski	Germany	2:13.67	Q
5	1	4	Laura Stephens	Great Britain	2:13.69	
6	3	4	Carmen Balbuena	Spain	2:13.70	Q
7	1	5	Boglárka Bonecz	Hungary	2:13.75	Q
8	3	6	Blanka Bokros	Hungary	2:15.07	Q
9	2	3	Andrea Melendo	Spain	2:15.37	Q
10	3	0	Elisa Scarpa Vidal	Italy	2:16.16	Q
11	3	2	Diana Naglič	Slovenia	2:17.21	Q
12	2	7	Alexandra Chesnokova	Russia	2:17.81	Q
13	1	3	Jana Zinnecker	Germany	2:18.65	Q
14	2	2	Caroline Hechenbichler	Austria	2:19.04	Q
15	1	6	Trine Kjøngerskov	Denmark	2:19.11	Q
16	2	6	Helena Rosendahl Bach	Denmark	2:19.66	Q
17	3	1	Emma Reid	Ireland	2:21.35	Q
18	3	7	Gaja Kristan	Slovenia	2:22.00	
19	1	1	Edita Chrápavá	Czech Republic	2:22.04	
20	1	8	Yüksel Deniz Özkan	Turkey	2:22.95	
21	1	7	Izabela Milanez	Slovenia	2:23.89	
22	2	1	Alsu Bayramova	Azerbaijan	2:24.36	
23	2	8	Olivia Sindico	Switzerland	2:24.74	
24	1	2	Eva Olsen	Denmark	2:24.82	
25	3	8	Thea Brandauer	Germany	2:25.37	

=== Semifinals ===
The semifinals were started on 23 June at 18:03.

==== Semifinal 1 ====
Rank	Lane	Name	Nationality	Time	Notes
1	5	Julia Mrozinski	Germany	2:11.58	Q
2	3	Boglárka Bonecz	Hungary	2:12.42	Q
3	4	Amelia Clynes	Great Britain	2:12.65	q
4	6	Andrea Melendo	Spain	2:15.75	
5	2	Diana Naglič	Slovenia	2:16.64	
6	7	Jana Zinnecker	Germany	2:16.80	
7	8	Emma Reid	Ireland	2:20.05	
8	1	Trine Kjøngerskov	Denmark	2:21.09	

==== Semifinal 2 ====
Rank	Lane	Name	Nationality	Time	Notes
1	3	Carmen Balbuena	Spain	2:11.52	Q, GR
2	6	Blanka Bokros	Hungary	2:11.86	Q
3	4	Holly Hibbott	Great Britain	2:12.69	q
4	2	Elisa Scarpa Vidal	Italy	2:13.62	q
5	5	Marina Luperi	Italy	2:13.96	q
6	7	Alexandra Chesnokova	Russia	2:16.69	
7	1	Caroline Hechenbichler	Austria	2:17.85	
8	8	Helena Rosendahl Bach	Denmark	2:20.53	

=== Final ===
The final was held on 24 June at 17:58.

Rank	Lane	Name	Nationality	Time	Notes
1st place, gold medalist(s)	5	Julia Mrozinski	Germany	2:11.19	GR
2nd place, silver medalist(s)	1	Elisa Scarpa Vidal	Italy	2:12.27	
3rd place, bronze medalist(s)	6	Boglárka Bonecz	Hungary	2:12.42	
4	4	Carmen Balbuena	Spain	2:12.43	
5	8	Marina Luperi	Italy	2:12.56	
6	2	Amelia Clynes	Great Britain	2:12.82	
7	3	Blanka Bokros	Hungary	2:14.56	
8	7	Holly Hibbott	Great Britain	2:15.66	
