= Swimming at the 2015 European Games – Women's 4 × 100 metre freestyle relay =

Women's 4 × 100 metre freestyle relay at the 2015 European Games
- Venue: Aquatic Palace
- Dates: 23 June
- Competitors: 52 from 11 nations
- Winning time: 3:43.63

Medalists
gold medal	Arina Openysheva; Vasilissa Buinaia; Olesia Cherniatina; Maria Kameneva; Polina Egorova; Anastasiya Kirpichnikova	Russia
silver medal	Pien Schravesande; Frederique Janssen; Laura van Engelen; Marrit Steenbergen; Josien Wijkhuijs	Netherlands
bronze medal	Darcy Deakin; Madeleine Crompton; Hannah Featherstone; Georgia Coates; Holly Hibbott	Great Britain

The women's 4 × 100 metre freestyle relay event at the 2015 European Games in Baku took place on 23 June at the Aquatic Palace.

== Results ==
=== Heats ===
The heats were started at 12:02.

Rank	Heat	Lane	Nation	Swimmers	Time	Notes
1	2	4	Russia	Vasilissa Buinaia (56.85); Polina Egorova (57.04); Olesia Cherniatina (56.77); Anastasiya Kirpichnikova (56.99)	3:47.65	Q, GR
2	2	6	Netherlands	Pien Schravesande (57.43); Frederique Janssen (56.80); Josien Wijkhuijs (57.13); Laura van Engelen (56.39)	3:47.75	Q
3	1	3	Great Britain	Darcy Deakin (57.32); Hannah Featherstone (57.22); Madeleine Crompton (57.67); Holly Hibbott (57.82)	3:50.03	Q
4	2	3	Germany	Josephine Tesch (56.92); Lia Neubert (59.47); Jana Zinnecker (57.70); Katrin Gottwald (57.30)	3:51.39	Q
5	1	6	Finland	Roosa Mört (57.52); Eveliina Kallio (58.42); Sohvi Nenonen (58.17); Reetta Kanervo (57.58)	3:51.69	Q
6	1	2	Poland	Adrianna Niewiadomska (58.84); Natalia Fryckowska (58.49); Katarzyna Rogowska (59.92); Magdalena Roman (56.74)	3:53.99	Q
7	1	4	Denmark	Emily Gantriis (58.20); Signe Bro (58.58); Josephine Holm (58.22); Trine Kjøngerskov (59.18)	3:54.18	Q
8	2	2	Austria	Caroline Hechenbichler (57.97); Esther Uhl (1:00.02); Cornelia Rott (59.35); Lena Opatril (58.46)	3:55.80	Q
9	1	5	Turkey	Almina Simla Ertan (1:00.11); Sezin Eligül (58.35); Yüksel Deniz Özkan (59.83); Zeynep Odabaşı (58.94)	3:57.23	
10	2	5	Lithuania	Bena Sarapaitė (1:00.04); Greta Pleikytė (1:00.18); Meda Kulbačiauskaitė (1:02.15); Diana Jaruševičiūtė (58.24)	4:00.61	
11	2	7	Iceland	Bryndís Bolladóttir (59.84); Sunneva Friðriksdóttir (1:00.38); Harpa Ingþórsdóttir (1:00.63); Eydís Kolbeinsdóttir (1:01.85)	4:02.70	

=== Final ===
The final was held at 19:49.

Rank	Lane	Nation	Swimmers	Time	Notes
1st place, gold medalist(s)	4	Russia	Arina Openysheva (55.06); Vasilissa Buinaia (56.75); Olesia Cherniatina (56.88); Maria Kameneva (54.94)	3:43.63	GR
2nd place, silver medalist(s)	5	Netherlands	Pien Schravesande (57.64); Frederique Janssen (56.87); Laura van Engelen (56.59); Marrit Steenbergen (53.00)	3:44.10	
3rd place, bronze medalist(s)	3	Great Britain	Darcy Deakin (56.75); Madeleine Crompton (56.93); Hannah Featherstone (56.56); Georgia Coates (55.56)	3:45.80	
4	6	Germany	Maxine Walters (56.93); Josephine Tesch (57.84); Leonie Kullmann (56.14); Katrin Gottwald (55.66)	3:46.57	
5	1	Denmark	Emily Gantriis (58.23); Julie Jensen (55.95); Signe Bro (57.91); Josephine Holm (57.98)	3:50.07	
6	2	Finland	Roosa Mört (58.14); Eveliina Kallio (57.71); Sohvi Nenonen (57.33); Reetta Kanervo (57.54)	3:50.72	
7	7	Poland	Magdalena Roman (57.72); Natalia Fryckowska (58.45); Julia Klonowska (59.38); Adrianna Niewiadomska (57.95)	3:53.50	
8	8	Austria	Lena Opatril (58.53); Esther Uhl (59.40); Cornelia Rott (58.29); Caroline Hechenbichler (59.36)	3:55.58	
