= Netherlands at the 2015 European Games =

- IOC code: NED
- NOC: NOC*NSF
- Website: www.nocnsf.nl

in Baku, Azerbaijan 12 – 28 June 2015
- Competitors: 117 in 17 sports
- Flag bearers: Reshmie Oogink (opening); Twan van Gendt (closing)
- Medals Ranked 9th: Gold 8 Silver 12 Bronze 9 Total 29

European Games appearances (overview)
- 2015; 2019; 2023; 2027

Netherlands participated at the 2015 European Games, in Baku, Azerbaijan from 12 to 28 June 2015.

117 athletes had been selected by the Dutch Olympic Committee to represent the Netherlands.

== Medalists ==
Medal	Name	Sport	Event	Date
Gold	Ellen van Dijk	Cycling	Women's time trial	18 June
Gold	Li Jiao	Table tennis	Women's singles	19 June
Gold	Lieke Wevers	Gymnastics	Women's balance beam	20 June
Gold	Marrit Steenbergen	Swimming	Women's 100 metre freestyle	24 June
Gold	Nouchka Fontijn	Boxing	Women's 75 kg	25 June
Gold	Kim Polling	Judo	Women's 70 kg	26 June
Gold	Henk Grol	Judo	Men's 100 kg	27 June
Gold	Marhinde Verkerk	Judo	Women's 78 kg	27 June
Silver	Rachel Klamer	Triathlon	Women's individual	13 June
Silver	Stef Clement	Cycling	Men's time trial	18 June
Silver	Britt Eerland; Li Jie; Li Jiao	Table tennis	Women's team	15 June
Silver	Li Jie	Table tennis	Women's singles	19 June
Silver	Casimir Schmidt	Gymnastics	Men's vault	20 June
Silver	Sjef van den Berg	Archery	Men's individual	22 June
Silver	Laura van Engelen; Frederique Janssen; Pien Schravesande; Marrit Steenbergen	Swimming	Women's 4 × 100 metre freestyle relay	23 June
Silver	Iris Tjonk; Tes Schouten; Josein Wijkhuis; Marrit Steenbergen	Swimming	Women's 4 × 100 metre medley relay	25 June
Silver	Marrit Steenbergen	Swimming	Women's 50 metre freestyle	26 June
Silver	Marrit Steenbergen	Swimming	Women's 200 metre freestyle	26 June
Silver	Laura van Engelen; Frederique Janssen; Marieke Tienstra; Marrit Steenbergen	Swimming	Women's 4 × 200 metre freestyle relay	27 June
Silver	Twan van Gendt	Cycling	Men's BMX	28 June
Bronze	Céline van Gerner; Lisa Top; Lieke Wevers	Gymnastics	Women's artistic team all-around	15 June
Bronze	Annemiek van Vleuten	Cycling	Women's time trial	18 June
Bronze	Lieke Wevers	Gymnastics	Women's artistic individual all-around	18 June
Bronze	Sjef van den Berg; Mitch Dielemans; Rick van der Ven	Archery	Men's team	18 June
Bronze	Anna van der Breggen	Cycling	Women's road race	20 June
Bronze	Lisa Top	Gymnastics	Women's vault	20 June
Bronze	Lieke Wevers	Gymnastics	Women's floor exercise	20 June
Bronze	Guillaume Elmont	Judo	Men's 90 kg	27 June
Bronze	Guusje Steenhuis	Judo	Women's 78 kg	27 June

Medals by sport
Sport	1st place, gold medalist(s)	2nd place, silver medalist(s)	3rd place, bronze medalist(s)	Total
Judo	3	0	2	5
Swimming	1	5	0	6
Cycling	1	2	2	5
Table Tennis	1	2	0	3
Gymnastics	1	1	4	6
Boxing	1	0	0	1
Archery	0	1	1	2
Triatlon	0	1	0	1
Total	8	12	9	29

== Archery ==
The Netherlands has qualified for three quota places in both the men's and the women's archery events at the Games, and as a result has also qualified for the team events.

Athlete	Event	Ranking round		Round of 64	Round of 32	Round of 16	Quarterfinals	Semifinals	Final / BM	
Athlete	Event	Score	Seed	Opposition Score	Opposition Score	Opposition Score	Opposition Score	Opposition Score	Opposition Score	Rank
Rick van der Ven	Men's individual	679	2	Guidi (San Marino); W 6–0	Weiss (Denmark); W 7–3	Ivashko (Ukraine); W 7–1	Prilepov (Belarus); L 4–6	Did not advance		5
Sjef van den Berg	Men's individual	678	3	Lapsins (Latvia); W 6–0	Hristov (Bulgaria); W 7–3	Ruban (Ukraine); W 6–4	Plihon (France); W 7–3	Prilepov (Belarus); W 6–0	Alvariño (Spain); L 1–7	2nd place, silver medalist(s)
Mitch Dielemans	Men's individual	655	29	Frangilli (Italy); W 7–3	Ivanytskyy (Ukraine); L 3–7	Did not advance				17
Shireen-Zoe de Vries	Women's individual	630	27	Alarcón (Spain); L w/o	Did not advance					33
Esther Deden	Women's individual	615	47	Myszor (Poland); W 6–4	Schuh (France); L 4–6	Did not advance				17
Annemarie der Kinderen	Women's individual	608	51	Ruggieri (France); L 4–6	Did not advance					33
Rick van der Ven; Sjef van den Berg; Mitch Dielemans	Men's team	2012	1	—N/a		Bye	Russia W 5–4	Ukraine L 3–5	France W 5–3	3rd place, bronze medalist(s)
Shireen-Zoe de Vries; Esther Deden; Annemarie der Kinderen	Women's team	1853	13	—N/a		Ukraine L 3–5	Did not advance			9
Shireen-Zoe de Vries; Rick van der Ven	Mixed team	1309	8	—N/a		Denmark W 6–0	Italy L 2–6	Did not advance		5

== Basketball ==
Team	Event	Group stage				Round of 16	Quarterfinals	Semifinals	Final / BM	
Team	Event	Opposition Score	Opposition Score	Opposition Score	Rank	Opposition Score	Opposition Score	Opposition Score	Opposition Score	Rank
Sharon Beld; Jinga Gosschalk; Karen Heinen; Karin Kuijt	Women's tournament	Switzerland; L	Azerbaijan; L	Greece; L	4 Q	Russia; L 12–20	Did not advance			

== Boxing ==
Athlete	Event	Round of 32	Round of 16	Quarterfinals	Semifinals	Final	
Athlete	Event	Opposition Score	Opposition Score	Opposition Score	Opposition Score	Opposition Score	Rank
Peter Müllenberg	Men's Light Heavy	BYE	Karlidag (Turkey); W 3–0	Mammad (Azerbaijan); L 0–3	Did not advance		
Nouchka Fontijn	Women's Middle	—N/a	Marshall (United Kingdom); W 3–0	Shambir (Ukraine); W 3–0	Scheurich (Germany); W 3–0	Laurell Nash (Sweden); W 3–0	1st place, gold medalist(s)

== Canoeing ==
Athlete	Event	Heats		Semifinals		Final	
Athlete	Event	Time	Rank	Time	Rank	Time	Rank
Eef Haaze	Women's K-1 5000 metres	—N/a				23:53.064	8

== Cycling ==
The Netherlands will participate in road cycling disciplines at the European Games.

=== Mountain biking ===
Men

Athlete	Event	Time	Rank
Michiel van der Heijden	Men's cross country	DNF	

=== Road ===
Men

Athlete	Event	Time	Rank
Stef Clement	Road Race	DNF	
Stef Clement	Time Trial	1:00:46.08	2nd place, silver medalist(s)
Pim Ligthart	Road Race	DNF	
Nick van de Lijke	Road Race	DNF	
Niki Terpstra	Road Race	5:27:29	8
Wouter Wippert	Road Race	5:33:43	30

Women

Athlete	Event	Time	Rank
Chantal Blaak	Road Race	DNF	
Lucinda Brand	Road Race	3:25:53	24
Anna van der Breggen	Road Race	3:20:36	3rd place, bronze medalist(s)
Ellen van Dijk	Road Race	3:20:54	4
Ellen van Dijk	Time trial	32:26.87	1st place, gold medalist(s)
Amy Pieters	Road race	3:25:53	19
Annemiek van Vleuten	Road race	3:24:17	7
Annemiek van Vleuten	Time trial	33:33.56	3rd place, bronze medalist(s)

=== BMX ===
Athlete	Event	Seeding		Quarterfinal		Semifinal		Final	
Athlete	Event	Result	Rank	Result	Rank	Result	Rank	Result	Rank
Twan van Gendt	Men's BMX	33.540	3 Q	3	1 Q	32.768	1 Q	33.887	2nd place, silver medalist(s)
Jelle van Gorkom	Men's BMX	34.382	15 Q	6	2 Q	33.941	2 Q	1:05.020	8
Merle van Benthem	Women's BMX	38.301	9 Q	—N/a		6	2 Q	38.370	4
Laura Smulders	Women's BMX	38.962	11 Q	—N/a		4	1 Q	43.176	5

== Diving ==
Men

Athlete	Event	Preliminaries		Final	
Athlete	Event	Points	Rank	Points	Rank
Pascal Faatz	10 m platform	334.45	19	Did not advance	

Women

Athlete	Event	Preliminaries		Final	
Athlete	Event	Points	Rank	Points	Rank
Daphne Wils	1 m springboard	350.10	12	373.95	11
Daphne Wils	3 m springboard	343.60	17	Did not advance	
Kimberley Lee	10 m platform	291.90	18	Did not advance	

== Fencing ==
Athlete	Event	Groupstage							Round of 32	Round of 16	Quarterfinals	Semifinals	Final / BM	
Athlete	Event	Opposition Score	Opposition Score	Opposition Score	Opposition Score	Opposition Score	Opposition Score	Rank	Opposition Score	Opposition Score	Opposition Score	Opposition Score	Opposition Score	Rank
Bas Verwijlen	Men's épée	Cimini (Italy); L 4–5	Hanczvikkel (Hungary); W 5–3	Aliyev (Azerbaijan); W 5–1	Dobrev (Bulgaria); W 5–1	Novosjolov (Estonia); L 1–5	von der Osten (Denmark); L 0–3	4 Q	Dida (Russia); W 15–12	Nikishin (Ukraine); W 15–8	Jerent (France); L 9–15	Did not advance		5

== Judo ==
Netherlands has qualified 12 athletes.

Men

Athlete	Event	Round of 64	Round of 32	Round of 16	Quarterfinals	Semifinals	Repechage	Final / BM	
Athlete	Event	Opposition Result	Opposition Result	Opposition Result	Opposition Result	Opposition Result	Opposition Result	Opposition Result	Rank
Jeroen Mooren	−60 kg	—N/a	Limare (FRA); W 010–000	McKenzie (GBR); W 011–000	Papinashvili (GEO); W 101–000	Mudranov (RUS); L 000–100	Bye	Chammartin (SUI); L 000–010	5
Dex Elmont	−73 kg	Bye	Shoka (GEO); W 010–000	Drebot (UKR); W 010–000	Muki (ISR); L 000–000	Did not advance	Ungvári (HUN); W 000–000	Van Tichelt (BEL); L 000–010	5
Guillaume Elmont	−90 kg	Bye	Mīlenbergs (LAT); W 010–000	Grossklaus (SUI); W 100–000	Gviniashvili (GEO); L 000–100	Did not advance	Žgank (SLO); W 011–000	Tóth (HUN); W 000–000	3rd place, bronze medalist(s)
Henk Grol	−100 kg	—N/a	Bye	Fletcher (GBR); W 010–000	Peters (GER); W 001–000	Fonseca (POR); W 010–000	Bye	Krpálek (CZE); W 001–000	1st place, gold medalist(s)
Michael Korrel	−100 kg	—N/a	Bloshenko (UKR); W 010–000	Frey (GER); L 000–010	Did not advance				
Roy Meyer	+100 kg	—N/a	Bye	Mettis (EST); W 000–000	Sasson (ISR); L 000–100	Did not advance	Khammo (UKR); L 000–111	Did not advance	

Women

Athlete	Event	Round of 32	Round of 16	Quarterfinals	Semifinals	Repechage	Final / BM	
Athlete	Event	Opposition Result	Opposition Result	Opposition Result	Opposition Result	Opposition Result	Opposition Result	Rank
Birgit Ente	−52 kg	Maros (HUN); W 011–000	Cohen (ISR); W 100–000	Euranie (FRA); L 000–100	Did not advance	Florian (ROU); L 000–100	Did not advance	
Sanne Verhagen	−57 kg	Bellorín (ESP); W 110–000	Ohâi (ROU); W 000–000	Monteiro (POR); L 000–000	Did not advance	Filzmoser (AUT); W 100–000	Gjakova (KOS); L 000–010	5
Juul Franssen	−63 kg	Szabó (HUN); W 000–000	Gwend (ITA); W 101–000	Trstenjak (SLO); L 001–001	Did not advance	Hermansson (SWE); W 100–000	Agbegnenou (FRA); L 000–011	5
Kim Polling	−70 kg	bye	Taeymans (BEL); W 100–000	Gercsák (HUN); W 100–000	Diedrich (GER); W 110–000	bye	Vargas Koch (GER); W 100–000	1st place, gold medalist(s)
Marhinde Verkerk	−78 kg	bye	Maranić (CRO); W 110–000	Powell (GBR); W 101–000	Tcheuméo (FRA); W 010–000	bye	Malzahn (GER); W 010–000	1st place, gold medalist(s)
Guusje Steenhuis	−78 kg	bye	De Saedelaere (BEL); W 101–000	Malzahn (GER); L 000–100	Did not advance	Turks (UKR); W 100–000	Tcheuméo (FRA); W 010–000	3rd place, bronze medalist(s)
Tessie Savelkouls	+78 kg	bye	Külbs (GER); L 000–000	Did not advance				

== Shooting ==
Athlete	Event	Qualification		Final	
Athlete	Event	Points	Rank	Points	Rank
Peter Hellenbrand	Men's 10 m air rifle	623.2	15	Did not advance	

== Swimming ==
Women

Athlete	Event	Heat		Semifinal		Final	
Athlete	Event	Time	Rank	Time	Rank	Time	Rank
Jasmijn Boon	50 m freestyle	26.76	17	Did not advance			
Frederique Janssen	50 m freestyle	26.67	13 Q	26.29	6 q	26.56	7
Pien Schravesande	50 m freestyle	27.04	26	Did not advance			
Marrit Steenbergen	50 m freestyle	25.86	3 Q	25.56	1 Q	25.27	2nd place, silver medalist(s)
Frederique Janssen	100 m freestyle	57.34	14 Q	57.06	5	Did not advance	
Marrit Steenbergen	100 m freestyle	55.18	1 Q	53.97	1 Q	53.97	1st place, gold medalist(s)
Laura van Engelen	200 m freestyle	2:03.47	6 Q	2:02.39	5	Did not advance	
Frederique Janssen	200 m freestyle	2:04.73	14	Did not advance			
Marrit Steenbergen	200 m freestyle	2:02.47	5 Q	2:01.60	2 Q	1:58.99	2nd place, silver medalist(s)
Marrit Tienstra	200 m freestyle	2:04.55	12	Did not advance			
Laura van Engelen	400 m freestyle	4:21.89	13	—N/a		Did not advance	
Iris Tjonk	50 m backstroke	30.22	=16 QSO	29.80	7	Did not advance	
Iris Tjonk	100 m backstroke	1:03.68	6 Q	1:03.00	3 q	1:03.84	8
Jasmijn Boon	200 m backstroke	2:20.91	19	Did not advance			
Marieke Tienstra	200 m backstroke	2:19.84	15 Q	2:17.41	6	Did not advance	
Iris Tjonk	200 m backstroke	2:19.34	12 Q	2:17.21	5	Did not advance	
Tes Schouten	50 m breaststroke	32.98	16 Q	32.90	7	Did not advance	
Tes Schouten	100 m breaststroke	1:12.31	16 Q	1:12.78	16	Did not advance	
Josien Wijkhuijs	50 m butterfly	27.45	2 Q	27.49	2 Q	27.20	4
Marieke Tienstra	200 m individual medley	2:21.89	13 Q	2:21.16	6	Did not advance	
Pien Schravesande; Frederique Janssen; Josien Wijkhuijs*; Laura van Engelen; Marrit Steenbergen	4 × 100 m freestyle relay	3:47.75	2 Q	—N/a		3:44.10	2nd place, silver medalist(s)
Marrit Steenbergen; Frederique Janssen; Marieke Tienstra; Laura van Engelen	4 × 200 m freestyle relay	8:17.00	3 Q	—N/a		8:04.65	2nd place, silver medalist(s)
Marieke Tienstra*; Tes Schouten; Josien Wijkhuijs; Frederique Janssen; Iris Tjonk	4 × 100 m medley relay	4:16.63	4 Q	—N/a		4:07.99	2nd place, silver medalist(s)

== Table tennis ==
Netherlands has qualified three athletes for the table tennis events.

Athlete	Event	Round 1	Round 2	Round of 16	Quarterfinals	Semifinals	Final / BM	
Athlete	Event	Opposition Result	Opposition Result	Opposition Result	Opposition Result	Opposition Result	Opposition Result	Rank
Li Jie	Women's singles	Bye	Szőcs (ROU); W 4–0	X Li (FRA); W 4–2	Y Han (GER); W 4–3	Ódorová (SVK); W 4–0	Li Jiao (NED); L 0–4	2nd place, silver medalist(s)
Li Jiao	Women's singles	Bye	Noskova (RUS); W 4–3	J Liu (AUT); W 4–0	Solja (GER); W 4–2	M Hu (TUR); W 4–2	Li Jie (NED); W 4-0	1st place, gold medalist(s)
Britt Eerland; Li Jiao; Li Jie	Women's team	—N/a		Serbia; W 3–0	Poland; W 3–2	Ukraine; W 3–2	Germany; L 2–3	2nd place, silver medalist(s)

== Taekwondo ==
Netherlands has qualified three athletes.

Athlete	Event	Round of 16	Quarterfinals	Semifinals	Repechage	Final / BM	
Athlete	Event	Opposition Result	Opposition Result	Opposition Result	Opposition Result	Opposition Result	Rank
Jeroen Wanrooij	Men's +80 kg	Sarı (TUR); W 10–9	Isayev (AZE); L 6–8	Did not advance	Bye	Golec (CRO); L 5–7	5
Joyce van Baaren	Women's 67 kg	Azizova (AZE); L 0–2	Did not advance		Tatar (TUR); L 0–3	Did not advance	
Reshmie Oogink	Women's +67 kg	Skaar (NOR); W 11–5	Radoš (CRO); L 3–7	Did not advance			

== Triathlon ==
Athlete	Event	Swim (1.5 km)	Trans 1	Bike (40 km)	Trans 2	Run (10 km)	Total Time	Rank
Maaike Caelers	Women's	22:02	0:47	1:05:03	0:26	36:28	2:04:46	12
Rachel Klamer	Women's	20:16	0:53	1:04:06	0:34	35:55	2:01:44	2nd place, silver medalist(s)

== Water polo ==
=== Women ===
Preliminary round

Pos	Team	Pld	W	D	L	GF	GA	GD	Pts	Qualification
1	Greece	5	4	0	1	78	29	+49	12 (Note: Greece 3 Pts, +5 GD; Netherlands 3 Pts, –1 GD; Hungary 3 Pts, –4 GD)	Semifinals
2	Netherlands	5	4	0	1	86	34	+52	12	Quarterfinals
3	Hungary	5	4	0	1	80	35	+45	12	Quarterfinals
4	Germany	5	2	0	3	32	61	−29	6	7–10th place semifinals
5	Great Britain	5	1	0	4	33	74	−41	3	7–12th place quarterfinals
6	Israel	5	0	0	5	18	94	−76	0	7–12th place quarterfinals

Source: Baku 2015
Notes:

12 June 2015; 12:00	Report	Netherlands	29–1	Israel	Water Polo Arena, Baku

13 June 2015; 20:30	Report	Greece	14–8	Netherlands	Water Polo Arena, Baku

14 June 2015; 16:45	Report	Netherlands	19–6	Great Britain	Water Polo Arena, Baku

15 June 2015; 20:30	Report	Netherlands	14–9	Hungary	Water Polo Arena, Baku

16 June 2015; 12:15	Report	Germany	4–16	Netherlands	Water Polo Arena, Baku

Quarterfinal

17 June 2015; 10:30	Report	Netherlands	12–18	Italy	Water Polo Arena, Baku; Referees: Vlaho Radičević (CRO); Ivan Raković (SRB)
17 June 2015; 10:30	Report	Score by quarters: 3–6, 3–4, 2–5, 4–3			Water Polo Arena, Baku; Referees: Vlaho Radičević (CRO); Ivan Raković (SRB)
17 June 2015; 10:30	Report	Rogge 3	Goals	Cocchiere 6	Water Polo Arena, Baku; Referees: Vlaho Radičević (CRO); Ivan Raković (SRB)

Fifth place game

20 June 2015; 15:00	Report	Netherlands	9–10	Hungary	Water Polo Arena, Baku; Referees: Ivan Raković (SRB); Radu Matache (ROU)
20 June 2015; 15:00	Report	Score by quarters: 4–2, 2–1, 0–2, 3–5			Water Polo Arena, Baku; Referees: Ivan Raković (SRB); Radu Matache (ROU)
20 June 2015; 15:00	Report	Mulder 3	Goals	three players 2	Water Polo Arena, Baku; Referees: Ivan Raković (SRB); Radu Matache (ROU)

== Volleyball ==
=== Indoor volleyball ===
- Women's tournament – one team of 14 players

Maret Balkestein-Grothues
Yvon Beliën
Anne Buijs
Robin de Kruijf
Laura Dijkema
Nicole Koolhaas
Nicole Oude Luttikhuis
Judith Pietersen
Celeste Plak
Myrthe Schoot
Lonneke Sloetjes
Debby Stam-Pilon
Quinta Steenbergen
Femke Stoltenborg

==== Group stage ====
Pos	Team	Pld	W	L	Pts	SW	SL	SR	SPW	SPL	SPR	Qualification
1	Serbia	5	4	1	13	14	4	3.500	426	359	1.187	Quarterfinals
2	Netherlands	5	4	1	11	12	7	1.714	432	405	1.067	Quarterfinals
3	Germany	5	3	2	9	12	8	1.500	428	434	0.986	Quarterfinals
4	Russia	5	2	3	5	7	11	0.636	392	406	0.966	Quarterfinals
5	Bulgaria	5	1	4	4	6	12	0.500	390	404	0.965	
6	Croatia	5	1	4	3	4	13	0.308	352	412	0.854	

Date	Time		Score		Set 1	Set 2	Set 3	Set 4	Set 5	Total	Report
13 Jun	20:00	Netherlands	3–1	Russia	25–19	21–25	25–22	25–21		96–87	Report
15 Jun	14:30	Croatia	1–3	Netherlands	23–25	17–25	25–17	21–25		86–92	Report
17 Jun	09:00	Netherlands	0–3	Germany	13–25	23–25	22–25			58–75	Report
19 Jun	14:30	Serbia	2–3	Netherlands	25–20	22–25	28–26	16–25	9–15	100–111	Report
21 Jun	11:00	Netherlands	3–0	Bulgaria	25–20	25–18	25–19			75–57	Report

==== Quarterfinals ====
Date	Time		Score		Set 1	Set 2	Set 3	Set 4	Set 5	Total	Report
23 Jun	19:00	Azerbaijan	3–0	Netherlands	25–21	25–23	25–14			75–58	Report

=== Beach volleyball ===
Athlete	Event	Preliminary round	Standing	Elimination Round	Round of 16	Quarterfinals	Semifinals	Final / BM	
Athlete	Event	Opposition Score	Standing	Opposition Score	Opposition Score	Opposition Score	Opposition Score	Opposition Score	Rank
Steven van de Velde; Michiel van Dorsten	Men's	Pool E Kubala – Hadrava (CZE); L 0 – 2 (18–21, 19–21); Faiga – Hilman (ISR); L 0 – 2 (17–21, 16–21); Sekerci – Mermer (TUR); L 1 – 2 (21–15, 17–21, 13–15)	4	did not advance					
Sophie van Gestel; Jantine van der Vlist	Women's	Pool D	1 Q	Bye	Schützenhöfer – Plesiutschnig (AUT); L 1 – 2 (18–21, 22–20, 13-15)	did not advance			
Rimke Braakman; Jolien Sinnema	Women's	Pool F	2 q	Karagkouni – Metheniti (GRE); W 2 – 0 (21–15, 21–17)	Longuet – Adelin (FRA); W 2 – 0 (22–20, 21–19)	Giombini – Toti (ITA); L 1 – 2 (19–21, 21–14, 16-18)	did not advance		

== Wrestling ==
Women's freestyle

Athlete	Event	Qualification	Round of 16	Quarterfinal	Semifinal	Repechage 1	Repechage 2	Final / BM	
Athlete	Event	Opposition Result	Opposition Result	Opposition Result	Opposition Result	Opposition Result	Opposition Result	Opposition Result	Rank
Jessica Blaszka	−48 kg	Bye	(Latvia) Tjapko (LAT); W 9–5	(Poland) Matkowska (LAT); L 0–7	did not advance				9
