= Boxing at the 2015 European Games – Women's 75 kg =

Boxing competitions

Women's middleweight boxing at the 2015 European Games
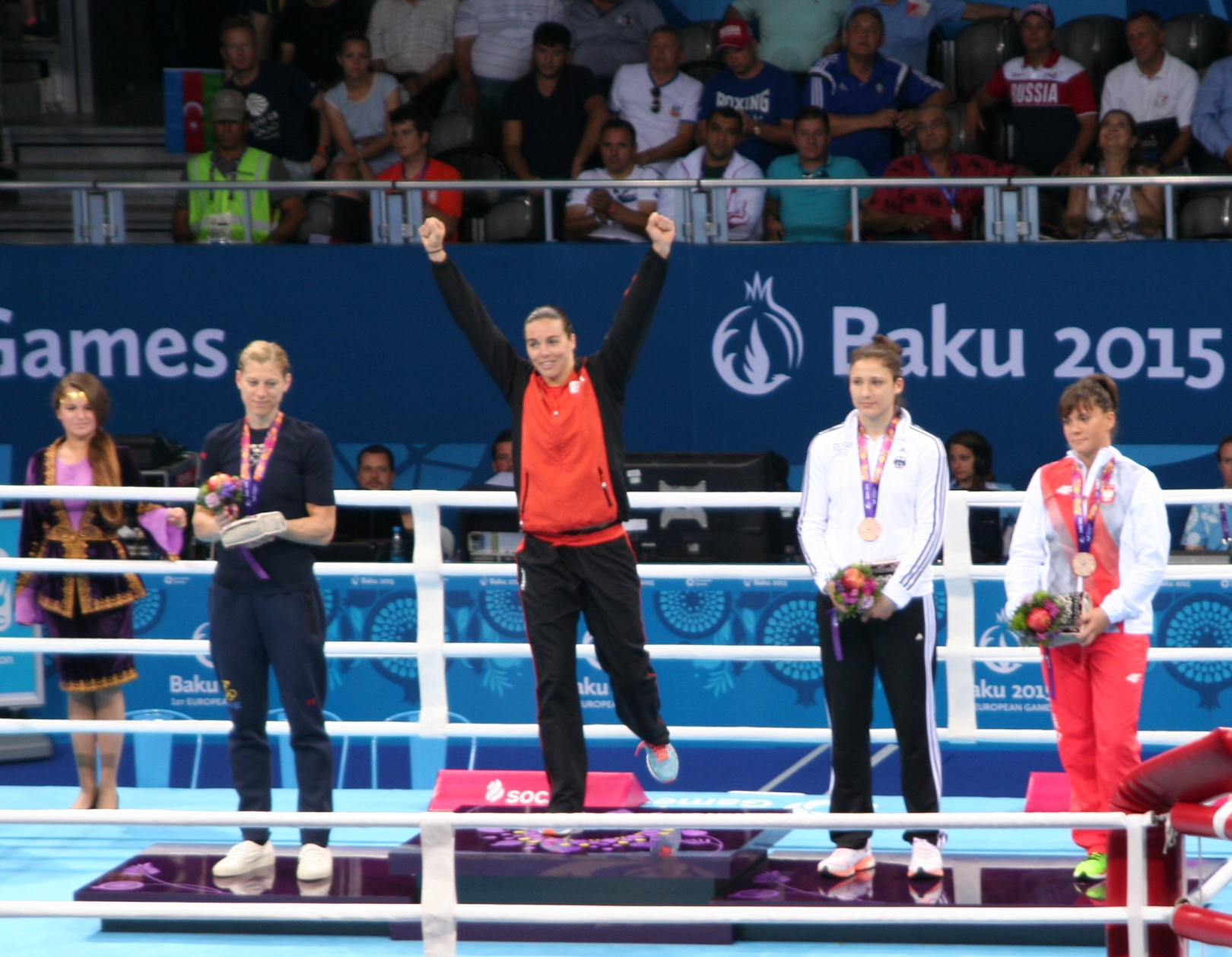
- The medal ceremony.
- Venue: Baku Crystal Hall
- Date: 19–25 June
- Competitors: 13 from 13 nations

Medalists
gold medal	Nouchka Fontijn	Netherlands
silver medal	Anna Laurell Nash	Sweden
bronze medal	Sarah Scheurich	Germany
bronze medal	Lidia Fidura	Poland

The women's 75 kg boxing event at the 2015 European Games in Baku was held from 19 to 25 June 2015 at the Baku Crystal Hall.

== Results ==
Round of 16
Sarah Scheurich (GER)	3
Ana Pătraşcu (ROU)	0
Kateryna Shambir (UKR)	2
Francesca Amato (ITA)	1
Savannah Marshall (GBR)	0
Nouchka Fontijn (NED)	3
Tímea Nagy (HUN)	0
Anna Laurell Nash (SWE)	3
Leyla Cavadova (AZE)	0
Yaroslava Yakushina (RUS)	2

Quarterfinals
Sema Çalışkan (TUR)	1
Sarah Scheurich (GER)	2
Kateryna Shambir (UKR)	0
Nouchka Fontijn (NED)	3
Victoriya Kebikava (BLR)	0
Anna Laurell Nash (SWE)	3
Yaroslava Yakushina (RUS)	1
Lidia Fidura (POL)	2

Semifinals
Sarah Scheurich (GER)	0
Nouchka Fontijn (NED)	3
Anna Laurell Nash (SWE)	2
Lidia Fidura (POL)	1

Final
Nouchka Fontijn (NED)	3
Anna Laurell Nash (SWE)	0
