= Swimming at the 2015 European Games – Women's 1500 metre freestyle =

Women's 1500 metre freestyle at the 2015 European Games
- Venue: Aquatic Palace
- Dates: 25 June
- Competitors: 18 from 13 nations
- Winning time: 16:40.17

Medalists
gold medal	Sveva Schiazzano	Italy
silver medal	Janka Juhász	Hungary
bronze medal	Marina Castro	Spain

The women's 1500 metre freestyle event at the 2015 European Games took place on 25 June at the Aquatic Palace in Baku.

== Results ==
The heats were started at 11:08 and 19:15.

Rank	Heat	Lane	Name	Nationality	Time	Notes
1st place, gold medalist(s)	2	1	Sveva Schiazzano	Italy	16:40.17	GR
2nd place, silver medalist(s)	2	5	Janka Juhász	Hungary	16:40.39	
3rd place, bronze medalist(s)	2	4	Marina Castro	Spain	16:46.16	
4	2	6	Josephine Tesch	Germany	16:54.06	
5	2	3	Paulina Piechota	Poland	17:00.47	
6	2	2	Paula Ruiz	Spain	17:07.00	
7	2	7	Mariana Petrova	Russia	17:07.52	
8	2	8	Lea Boy	Germany	17:08.30	
9	1	5	Julia Adamczyk	Poland	17:22.63	
10	1	3	Maja Uduč	Slovenia	17:31.28	
11	1	4	Gaja Kristan	Slovenia	17:36.04	
12	1	6	Eydís Ósk Kolbeinsdóttir	Iceland	17:36.25	
13	1	2	Jill Benne	Switzerland	17:40.15	
14	1	0	Greta Gataveckaitė	Lithuania	17:42.21	
15	1	9	Harpa Ingþórsdóttir	Iceland	17:43.52	
16	1	1	Emilia Colti Dumitrescu	Romania	17:48.66	
17	1	8	Katie Baguley	Ireland	17:49.56	
18	1	7	Essi-Maria Lillman	Finland	17:49.58	
