= Gymnastics at the 2015 European Games – Men's synchronized trampoline =

Men's synchronized trampoline at the 2015 European Games
- Venue: National Gymnastics Arena
- Date: 19, 21 June
- Competitors: 22 from 11 nations
- Winning score: 51.100

Medalists
gold medal	Mikhail Melnik; Dmitry Ushakov	Russia
silver medal	Uladzislau Hancharou; Mikalai Kazak	Belarus
bronze medal	Martin Gromowski; Kyrylo Sonn	Germany

The men's synchronized trampoline competition at the 2015 European Games was held at the National Gymnastics Arena on 19 and 21 June 2015.

== Qualification ==
Rank	Gymnast	Nation	Routine 1	Routine 2	Total	Qual.
1	Uladzislau Hancharou; Mikalai Kazak	Belarus	40.100	50.400	90.500	Q
2	Mikhail Melnik; Dmitry Ushakov	Russia	39.900	48.900	88.800	Q
3	Martin Gromowski; Kyrylo Sonn	Germany	39.900	48.300	88.200	Q
4	Bartłomiej Hes; Łukasz Tomaszewski	Poland	37.500	48.200	85.700	Q
5	Naim Ashhab; Martin Pelc	Czech Republic	37.700	44.600	82.300	Q
6	Måns Åberg; Jonas Nordfors	Sweden	38.400	43.900	82.300	Q
7	Sébastien Martiny; Allan Morante	France	38.400	34.800	73.200	R1
8	Simon Progin; Nicolas Schori	Switzerland	38.100	23.300	61.400	R2
9	Ilya Grishunin; Oleg Piunov	Azerbaijan	34.200	20.200	54.400	
10	Dmytro Byedyevkin; Mykola Prostorov	Ukraine	38.200	10.800	49.000	
11	Diogo Ganchinho; Ricardo Santos	Portugal	37.600	10.200	47.800	

== Final ==
Rank	Gymnast	Nation	D Score	E Score	S Score	Pen	Total
1st place, gold medalist(s)	Mikhail Melnik; Dmitry Ushakov	Russia	16.000	16.300	18.800		51.100
2nd place, silver medalist(s)	Uladzislau Hancharou; Mikalai Kazak	Belarus	14.600	17.400	18.800		50.800
3rd place, bronze medalist(s)	Martin Gromowski; Kyrylo Sonn	Germany	16.000	15.800	17.000		48.800
4	Naim Ashhab; Martin Pelc	Czech Republic	14.000	15.700	19.000		48.700
5	Måns Åberg; Jonas Nordfors	Sweden	13.800	15.000	16.400		45.200
6	Bartłomiej Hes; Łukasz Tomaszewski	Poland	3.400	3.400	3.800		10.600
