= Fencing at the 2015 European Games – Men's team sabre =

Men's team sabre at the 2015 European Games
- Venue: Crystal Hall 3
- Date: 26 June
- Competitors: 24 from 6 nations

Medalists
gold medal	Luigi Miracco; Massimiliano Murolo; Alberto Pellegrini; Giovanni Repetti	Italy
silver medal	Alin Badea; Mădălin Bucur; Tiberiu Dolniceanu; Iulian Teodosiu	Romania
bronze medal	Richard Hübers; Björn Hübner; Maximilian Kindler; Robin Schrödter	Germany

The men's team sabre competition at the 2015 European Games in Baku was held on 26 June at the Crystal Hall 3.

== Results ==
Quarterfinals
Romania	45
Hungary	34
Russia	45
Azerbaijan	18

Semifinals
Germany	44
Romania	45
Russia	42
Italy	45

Final
Romania	44
Italy	45
Third place
Germany	45
Russia	44

Fifth place
Hungary	45
Azerbaijan	19

== Final standing ==
Rank	Team
1st place, gold medalist(s)	Italy; Luigi Miracco; Massimiliano Murolo; Alberto Pellegrini; Giovanni Repetti
2nd place, silver medalist(s)	Romania; Alin Badea; Mădălin Bucur; Tiberiu Dolniceanu; Iulian Teodosiu
3rd place, bronze medalist(s)	Germany; Richard Hübers; Björn Hübner; Maximilian Kindler; Robin Schrödter
4	Russia; Ilya Motorin; Nikita Proskura; Boris Savich; Alexander Trushakov
5	Hungary; Márton Bence Csaba; Bence Gémesi; Etele Ravasz; Martin Singer
6	Azerbaijan; Javanshir Aghakishiyev; Abdulla Hasanov; Javanshir Safarov; Azar Taghiyev
