= Boxing at the 2015 European Games – Women's 54 kg =

Boxing competitions

Women's bantamweight boxing at the 2015 European Games
- Venue: Baku Crystal Hall
- Date: 20–26 June
- Competitors: 11 from 11 nations

Medalists
gold medal	Elena Savelyeva	Russia
silver medal	Marzia Davide	Italy
bronze medal	Anna Alimardanova	Azerbaijan
bronze medal	Azize Nimani	Germany

The women's bantamweight 54 kg boxing event at the 2015 European Games in Baku was held from 20 to 26 June at the Baku Crystal Hall.

== Results ==
Round of 16; 20 June
Michaela Walsh (IRL)	0
Elena Savelyeva (RUS)	3
Marjut Lausti (FIN)	0
Marzia Davide (ITA)	3
Azize Nimani (GER)	2
Delphine Mancini (FRA)	0

Quarterfinals; 23 June
Ayşe Taş (TUR)	0
Elena Savelyeva (RUS)	3
Stanimira Petrova (BUL)	0
Anna Alimardanova (AZE)	3
Ewelina Wicherska (POL)	0
Marzia Davide (ITA)	3
Azize Nimani (GER)	3
Iulia Coroli (MDA)	0

Semifinals; 25 June
Elena Savelyeva (RUS)	3
Anna Alimardanova (AZE)	0
Marzia Davide (ITA)	2
Azize Nimani (GER)	1

Final; 26 June
Elena Savelyeva (RUS)	3
Marzia Davide (ITA)	0
