= Diving at the 2015 European Games – Women's 10 metre platform =

Women's 10 metre platform at the 2015 European Games
- Venue: Baku Aquatics Centre
- Dates: 18 June
- Competitors: 24 from 14 nations
- Winning points: 456.70

Medalists
gold medal	Lois Toulson	Great Britain
silver medal	Anna Chuinyshena	Russia
bronze medal	Elena Wassen	Germany

The women's 10 metre platform competition at the 2015 European Games in Baku took place on 18 June at the Baku Aquatics Centre.

== Results ==
The preliminary round was started at 13:20. The final was held at 20:30.

Green denotes finalists

Rank	Diver	Nationality	Preliminary		Final	
Rank	Diver	Nationality	Points	Rank	Points	Rank
1st place, gold medalist(s)	Lois Toulson	Great Britain	389.20	2	456.70	1
2nd place, silver medalist(s)	Anna Chuinyshena	Russia	386.80	3	429.15	2
3rd place, bronze medalist(s)	Elena Wassen	Germany	383.00	4	410.40	3
4	Shanice Lobb	Great Britain	377.40	5	397.70	4
5	Yulia Timoshinina	Russia	409.60	1	363.40	5
6	Fränze Jahn	Germany	341.05	7	356.70	6
7	Vlada Tatsenko	Ukraine	338.85	9	343.15	7
8	Anne Vilde Tuxen	Norway	333.10	10	333.15	8
9	Ellen Ek	Sweden	347.50	6	330.50	9
10	Saija Paavola	Finland	340.70	8	323.25	10
11	Olqa Bikovskaya	Azerbaijan	323.30	11	305.75	11
12	Ellen Sirkka	Finland	320.50	12	302.00	12
13	Valeriia Liulko	Ukraine	315.00	13	Did not advance	
14	Krystsina Sheshka	Belarus	313.95	14	Did not advance	
15	Ioana Cîrjan	Romania	301.85	15	Did not advance	
16	Dominika Mirowska	Poland	297.60	16	Did not advance	
17	Tamar Sitchinava	Georgia	295.40	17	Did not advance	
18	Kimberley Lee	Netherlands	291.90	18	Did not advance	
19	Julie Synnøve Thorsen	Norway	290.15	19	Did not advance	
20	Maïssam Naji	France	285.60	20	Did not advance	
21	Ioana Paștiu	Romania	279.80	21	Did not advance	
22	Noor Lanen	Netherlands	276.85	22	Did not advance	
23	Anna Taciak	Poland	265.05	23	Did not advance	
24	Inès Hummel	France	263.85	24	Did not advance	
