= Gymnastics at the 2015 European Games – Men's vault =

Men's vault at the 2015 European Games
- Venue: National Gymnastics Arena
- Date: 20 June
- Competitors: 6 from 6 nations
- Winning score: 15.266

Medalists
gold medal	Oleg Verniaiev	Ukraine
silver medal	Casimir Schmidt	Netherlands
bronze medal	Oleg Stepko	Azerbaijan

The men's artistic gymnastics vault competition at the 2015 European Games was held at the National Gymnastics Arena, Baku on 20 June 2015.

== Qualification ==
The top six gymnasts with one per country advanced to the final.

Rank	Gymnast	Vault 1				Vault 2				Total	Qual.
Rank	Gymnast	D Score	E Score	Pen.	Score 1	D Score	E Score	Pen.	Score 2	Total	Qual.
1	Oleg Verniaiev (UKR)	6.000	9.466		15.466	6.000	9.200		15.200	15.333	Q
2	Ihor Radivilov (UKR)	6.000	9.266		15.266	6.000	8.866		14.666	14.966	
3	Oleg Stepko (AZE)	5.600	9.266		14.866	5.600	9.200		14.800	14.833	Q
4	Tomi Tuuha (FIN)	5.600	9.200		14.800	5.600	9.100	−0.200	14.000	14.650	Q
5	Ferhat Arıcan (TUR)	5.600	9.166		14.766	5.200	9.000		14.200	14.483	Q
6	Casimir Schmidt (NED)	6.000	8.766	−0.100	14.666	5.600	8.566		14.166	14.416	Q
7	Cristian Bățagă (ROU)	5.600	9.033	−0.100	14.533	5.200	9.100		14.300	14.416	Q
8	Marco Rizzo (SUI)	5.600	8.933	−0.100	14.433	5.600	8.766		14.366	14.399	R1
9	Pavel Bulauski (BLR)	5.600	9.266		14.866	6.000	7.900	−0.100	13.800	14.333	R2
10	Fabián González (ESP)	5.600	8.933		14.533	5.200	8.733		13.933	14.233	R3

== Final ==
Rank	Gymnast	Vault 1				Vault 2				Total
Rank	Gymnast	D Score	E Score	Pen.	Score 1	D Score	E Score	Pen.	Score 2	Total
1st place, gold medalist(s)	Oleg Verniaiev (UKR)	6.000	9.400		15.400	6.000	9.133		15.133	15.266
2nd place, silver medalist(s)	Casimir Schmidt (NED)	6.000	9.133	−0.100	15.033	6.000	9.200		15.200	15.116
3rd place, bronze medalist(s)	Oleg Stepko (AZE)	5.600	9.333		14.933	5.600	9.400		15.000	14.966
4	Tomi Tuuha (FIN)	5.600	9.433		15.033	5.600	9.300	−0.100	14.800	14.916
5	Cristian Bățagă (ROU)	5.600	9.133		14.733	5.200	9.300		14.500	14.616
6	Ferhat Arıcan (TUR)	5.600	9.166		14.766	5.200	9.166		14.366	14.566
