= Pasi Hirvonen =

Finnish ice hockey player

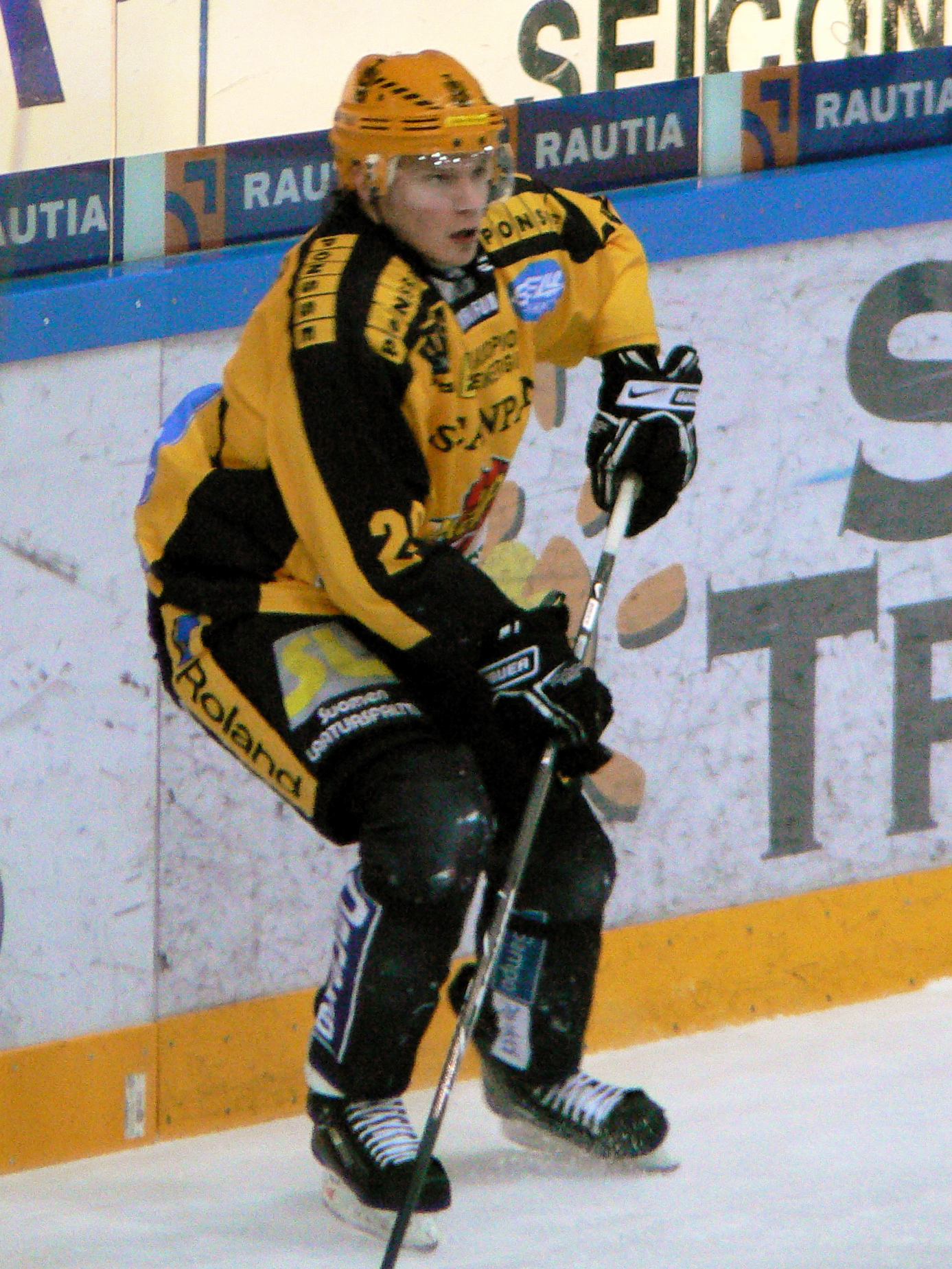
- Born: November 4, 1988 (age 37) Vantaa, Finland
- Height: 6 ft 3 in (191 cm)
- Weight: 198 lb (90 kg; 14 st 2 lb)
- Position: Defence
- Shot: Right
- Played for: KalPa; TPS; Rapaces de Gap; LHC Les Lions
- Playing career: 2008–2016

Pasi Hirvonen (born November 4, 1988) is a Finnish former professional ice hockey defenceman.

Hirvonen played 110 games in the Finnish Liiga with KalPa and TPS. He also played in Ligue Magnus in France for Rapaces de Gap and LHC Les Lions
