= Daria Chikunova =

Russian swimmer (born 1999)

Personal information
- Born: 12 April 1999 (age 27)

Sport
- Sport: Swimming

Daria Chikunova (born 12 April 1999) is a Russian swimmer. She competed in the women's 100 metre breaststroke event at the 2016 Summer Olympics.
