= Ilektra Lebl =

Greek swimmer (born 1999)

Personal information
- Born: 12 February 1999 (age 27)

Sport
- Sport: Swimming
Medal record
Representing Greece
European Games
Bronze medal – third place	2015 Baku	100m butterfly

Ilektra Lebl (born 12 February 1999) is a Greek swimmer. She competed in the women's 200 metre individual medley event at the 2017 World Aquatics Championships.
