= Sarah Scheurich =

German boxer (born 1993)

Personal information
- Born: Sarah Alexandra Scheurich; 1 October 1993 (age 32) Crivitz, Mecklenburg-Vorpommern, Germany
- Height: 6 ft (183 cm)
- Weight: Light-heavyweight, Middleweight

Boxing career
- Stance: Orthodox

Boxing record
- Total fights: 7
- Wins: 7
- Win by KO: 4
Medal record
Women's amateur boxing
Representing Germany
European Amateur Boxing Championships
| Silver medal – second place | 2014 Bucharest | 75kg |
European Union Amateur Boxing Championships
| Silver medal – second place | 2013 Keszthely | 81kg |
European Games
| Bronze medal – third place | 2015 Baku | 75kg |

Sarah Scheurich (born 1 October 1993) is a German professional boxer. She became the IBF female light-heavyweight champion by defeating reigning title holder Lani Daniels via unanimous decision at Lambert Arena im Weberpark in Göppingen, Baden-Württemberg, Germany, on 6 December 2025. Before turning professional in 2022, Scheurich had a lengthy amateur career including winning two national titles, a silver medal at the 2014 European Championships and a bronze medal at the 2015 European Games.
