= Mitch Dielemans =

Dutch archer (born 1993)

Personal information
- Full name: Mitch Dielemans
- Born: 6 January 1993 (age 33) Geldrop, Netherlands
- Height: 1.86 m (6 ft 1 in)
- Weight: 75 kg (165 lb)

Sport
- Country: Netherlands
- Sport: Archery
- Event: Recurve
Medal record
Men's archery
Representing the Netherlands
European Games
Bronze medal – third place	2015 Baku	Team
- Updated on 22 February 2017

Mitch Dielemans (born 6 January 1993) is a Dutch competitive archer. He won a bronze medal in the men's team recurve at the 2015 European Games, and eventually competed as a member of the Dutch archery squad at the 2016 Summer Olympics. Dielemans currently serves as an intern at the Dutch sport centre Papendal, while pursuing his studies major in commercial economics at the Randstad Topsport Academie in Deventer.

Dielemans rose to prominence in the international archery scene at the 2015 European Games in Baku, Azerbaijan. There, he and his compatriots Sjef van den Berg and London 2012 fourth-place finalist Rick van der Ven launched eleven perfect 10s to beat the Frenchmen for the bronze medal with a steady 3–5 score.

Shortly after the European Games, Dielemans contributed to the Dutch trio's performance by finishing sixth and obtaining a full quota place for Rio 2016 at the World Championships in Copenhagen, Denmark, booking his country's maiden appearance in an Olympic archery competition since Athens 2004.

Dielemans was selected to compete for the Dutch squad at the 2016 Summer Olympics in Rio de Janeiro, shooting in both individual and team recurve tournaments. First, Dielemans managed to tally a total of 634 points out of a maximum 720 to obtain a fifty-eighth seed heading to the knockout stage, along with his team's score of 1,981 accumulated from the classification round. In the men's team recurve, Dielemans, alongside his compatriots Van den Berg and Van der Ven, firmly disposed the Spaniards with a 5–1 score in the opening round, before conceding a 2–6 defeat to the eventual champion South Korea during their quarterfinal match. In the men's individual recurve, Dielemans proved more challenging in an attempt to overthrow London 2012 silver medalist Takaharu Furukawa of Japan, succumbing his Olympic debut to an opening-round defeat at 1–7.
