= Italy at the 2015 European Games =

- IOC code: ITA
- NOC: Italian National Olympic Committee
- Website: www.coni.it

in Baku, Azerbaijan 12 – 28 June 2015
- Competitors: 295 in 23 sports
- Flag bearer: Giulia Quintavalle
- Medals Ranked 6th: Gold 10 Silver 26 Bronze 11 Total 47

European Games appearances (overview)
- 2015; 2019; 2023; 2027

Italy competed at the 2015 European Games, in Baku, Azerbaijan from 12 to 28 June 2015. 295 athletes (168 men and 127 women) competed in 23 sports.

== Medalists ==
| Medal | Name | Sport | Event | Date |
|---|---|---|---|---|
| Gold | Natalia Valeeva; Guendalina Sartori; Elena Tonetta | Archery | Women's team | 18 June |
| Gold | Natalia Valeeva; Mauro Nespoli | Archery | Mixed team | 17 June |
| Gold | Petra Zublasing | Shooting | Women's 50 metre rifle three positions | 19 June |
| Gold | Valerio Luchini | Shooting | Men's skeet | 21 June |
| Gold | Niccolò Campriani; Petra Zublasing | Shooting | Mixed 10 metre air rifle | 22 June |
| Gold | Valerio Luchini; Diana Bacosi | Shooting | Mixed skeet | 22 June |
| Gold | Alice Volpi | Fencing | Women's foil | 23 June |
| Gold | Alessio Foconi | Fencing | Men's foil | 25 June |
| Gold | Sveva Schiazzano | Swimming | Women's 1500 metre freestyle | 25 June |
| Gold | Luigi Miracco; Massimiliano Murolo; Alberto Pellegrini; Giovanni Repetti | Fencing | Men's team sabre | 26 June |
| Silver | Luca Maresca | Karate | Men's kumite 60 kg | 13 June |
| Silver | Luigi Busà | Karate | Men's kumite 75 kg | 13 June |
| Silver | Mattia Busato | Karate | Men's individual kata | 14 June |
| Silver | Niccolò Campriani | Shooting | Men's metre air rifle | 16 June |
| Silver | Frank Chamizo | Wrestling | Men's freestyle 65 kg | 17 June |
| Silver | Vincenzo Mangiacapre | Boxing | Men's 64 kg | 17 June |
| Silver | Valentino Manfredonia | Boxing | Men's 81 kg | 17 June |
| Silver | Marco De Nicolo | Shooting | Men's 50 metre rifle prone | 18 June |
| Silver | Ruslan Cristofori | Diving | Men's 3 metre springboard | 20 June |
| Silver | Diana Bacosi | Shooting | Women's skeet | 20 June |
| Silver | Vincenzo Picardi | Boxing | Men's 52 kg | 20 June |
| Silver | Michela Castoldi; Davide Donati | Gymnastics | Mixed aerobic pairs | 21 June |
| Silver | Marzia Davide | Boxing | Women's 54 kg | 23 June |
| Silver | Valentina Alberti | Boxing | Women's 64 kg | 23 June |
| Silver | Alessandro Miressi; Giovanni Izzo; Ivano Vendrame; Alessandro Bori | Swimming | Men's 4 × 100 metre freestyle relay | 23 June |
| Silver | Ilaria Cusinato | Swimming | Women's 400 metre individual medley | 23 June |
| Silver | Elisa Scarpa Vidal | Swimming | Women's 200 metre butterfly | 24 June |
| Silver | Alessandro Miressi | Swimming | Men's 100 metre freestyle | 25 June |
| Silver | Gianco Carini | Swimming | Men's 200 metre butterfly | 25 June |
| Silver | Giuila Verona | Swimming | Women's 200 metre breaststroke | 25 June |
| Silver | Alessio Foconi; Francesco Ingargiola; Lorenzo Nista; Damiano Rosatelli | Fencing | Men's team foil | 27 June |
| Silver | Sofia Ciaraglia; Martina Criscio; Rebecca Gargano; Caterina Navarria | Fencing | Women's team sabre | 27 June |
| Silver | Giovanni Izzo | Swimming | Men's 50 metre freestyle | 27 June |
| Silver | Giuila Verona | Swimming | Women's 100 metre breaststroke | 27 June |
| Silver | Ilaria Cusinato | Swimming | Women's 200 metre individual medley | 27 June |
| Silver | Italy national beach soccer team: Stefano Spada; Mateo Marucci; Giuseppe Platania; Dario Ramaciotti; Francesco Corosiniti (C); Giuseppe Soria; Gabriele Gori; Paolo Palmacci; Simone Marinai; Andrea Carpita | Beach soccer | Men's | 28 June |
| Bronze | Giovanni Pellielo | Shooting | Men's trap | 17 June |
| Bronze | Antonino Barillà | Shooting | Men's double trap | 19 June |
| Bronze | Chiara Cainero | Shooting | Women's skeet | 20 June |
| Bronze | Luigi Miracco | Fencing | Men's sabre | 23 June |
| Bronze | Alberto Pellegrini | Fencing | Men's sabre | 23 June |
| Bronze | Valentina Cipriani | Fencing | Women's foil | 23 June |
| Bronze | Francesco Ingargiola | Fencing | Men's foil | 25 June |
| Bronze | Camilla Batini; Brenda Briasco; Giulia Rizzi; Alberta Santuccio | Fencing | Women's team épée | 26 June |
| Bronze | Chiara Cini; Valentina Cipriani; Carolina Erba; Alice Volpi | Fencing | Women's team foil | 26 June |
| Bronze | Gabriele Bino; Gabriele Cimini; Marco Fichera; Andrea Santarelli | Fencing | Men's team épée | 27 June |
| Bronze | Giulia Cantoni; Assunta Galeone; Odette Giuffrida; Edwige Gwend; Elisa Marchio; Valentina Moscatt; Giulia Quintavalle | Judo | Women's team | 28 June |

== Archery ==
Italy has qualified for three quota places in both the men's and the women's archery events at the Games, and as a result has also qualified for the team events.

| Athlete | Event | Ranking round | | Round of 64 | Round of 32 | Round of 16 | Quarterfinals | Semifinals | Final / BM | |
| Athlete | Event | Score | Seed | Opposition Score | Opposition Score | Opposition Score | Opposition Score | Opposition Score | Opposition Score | Rank |
|---|---|---|---|---|---|---|---|---|---|---|
| Mauro Nespoli | Men's individual | 683 | 1 | Asllani (KOS); W 6–0 | Wojtkowiak (POL); W 6–0 | Naploszek (POL); L 4–6 | Did not advance | | | 9 |
| David Pasqualucci | Men's individual | 666 | 13 | Wallace (IRL); W 6–2 | Henckels (LUX); L 4–6 | Did not advance | | | | 17 |
| Michele Frangilli | Men's individual | 650 | 36 | Dielemans (NED); L 3–7 | Did not advance | | | | | 33 |
| Natalia Valeeva | Women's individual | 653 | 3 | Sahiti (KOS); W w/o | Lobzhenidze (GEO); L 2–6 | Did not advance | | | | 17 |
| Guendalina Sartori | Women's individual | 648 | 6 | Nosaliene (LTU); W 7–3 | Alarcón (ESP); W 6–4 | Richter (GER); W 6–4 | Marin (ESP); L 2–6 | Did not advance | | 5 |
| Elena Tonetta | Women's individual | 637 | 16 | Chorti (GRE); W 6–2 | Marchenko (UKR); W 7–3 | Unruh (GER); W 6–2 | Winter (GER); L 1–7 | Did not advance | | 5 |
| Mauro Nespoli; David Pasqualucci; Michele Frangilli | Men's team | 1999 | 5 | — | | Azerbaijan (AZE); W 5–4 | Ukraine (UKR); L 2–6 | Did not advance | | 5 |
| Natalia Valeeva; Guendalina Sartori; Elena Tonetta | Women's team | 1938 | 3 | — | | Greece (GRE); W 6–2 | Denmark (DEN); W 5–4 | Russia (RUS); W 5–3 | Belarus (BLR); W 5–3 | 1st place, gold medalist(s) |
| Natalia Valeeva; Mauro Nespoli | Mixed team | 1336 | 1 | — | | Azerbaijan (AZE); W 6–0 | Netherlands (NED); W 6–2 | Ukraine (UKR); W 5–1 | Georgia (GEO); W 5–3 | 1st place, gold medalist(s) |

== Badminton ==
- Men's individual – 1 athlete
- Men's team – 1 team of 2 athletes
- Women's individual – 1 athlete
- Mixed team – 1 team of 2 athletes

== Basketball ==
- Men's team – 1 team of 4 athletes

== Beach soccer ==
- Men's team – 1 team of 12 athletes

== Boxing ==
- Women's 51 kg
- Women's 54 kg
- Women's 60 kg
- Women's 64 kg
- Women's 70 kg

== Canoe sprint ==
- Men's K1 200m
- Men's K2 200m
- Men's C1 1000m
- Women's K1 200m
- Women's K1 500m
- Women's K1 5000m
- Women's K2 200m
- Women's K2 500m

== Cycling ==
- Men's road race – 5 athletes
- Women's road race – 5 athletes
- Men's time trial – 2 athletes
- Men's time trial – 2 athletes

=== Mountain biking ===
Men's cross country – 3 athletes Men's cross country – 2 athletes

=== BMX ===
- Men's – 2 athletes

== Fencing ==
- Men's Épée – Gabriele Bino, Gabriele Cimini, Marco Fichera, Andrea Santarelli
- Men's Foil – Alessio Foconi, Francesco Ingargiola, Lorenzo Nista, Damiano Rosatelli
- Men's Sabre – Luigi Miracco, Massimiliano Murolo, Alberto Pellegrini, Giovanni Repetti
- Men's Épée team – 1 team of 4 athletes
- Men's Sabre team – 1 team of 4 athletes
- Men's Foil team – 1 team of 4 athletes
- Women's Épée – Camilla Batini, Francesca Boscarelli, Brenda Briasco, Alberta Santuccio
- Women's Foil – Chiara Cini, Valentina Cipriani, Carolina Erba, Alice Volpi
- Women's Sabre – Sofia Ciaraglia, Martina Criscio, Caterina Navarria, Rebecca Gargano
- Women's Épée team – 1 team of 4 athletes
- Women's Sabre team – 1 team of 4 athletes
- Women's Foil team – 1 team of 4 athletes

== Gymnastics ==
=== Aerobic ===
- Pairs – 1 pair of 2 athletes
- Groups – 1 team of 5 athletes

=== Artistic ===
- Women's – 3 quota places
- Men's – 3 quota places

=== Rhythmic ===
- Individual – 1 quota place
- Groups – 1 team of 6 athletes

=== Trampoline ===
- Men's individual – 1 quota place

== Karate ==
- Men's 60 kg
- Men's 75 kg
- Men's 80 kg
- Men's Kata

== Sambo ==
- Men's 74 kg

== Table tennis ==
- Men's individual – 1 quota place

== Triathlon ==
- Men's – Matthias Steinwandter, Delian Stateff, Riccardo De Palma
- Women's – Elena Maria Petrini, Alessia Orla, Lisa Schanung

== Water polo ==
- Men's – 1 team of 13 athletes
- Women's – 1 team of 13 athletes

== Volleyball ==
=== Indoor ===
- Men's – 1 team of 14 athletes
- Women's – 1 team of 14 athletes

=== Beach ===
- Men's – 2 team of 2 athletes
- Women's – 2 team of 2 athletes
