= Denmark at the 2015 European Games =

- IOC code: DEN
- NOC: National Olympic Committee and Sports Confederation of Denmark
- Website: www.dif.dk

in Baku, Azerbaijan 12 – 28 June 2015
- Competitors: 65 in 14 sports
- Flag bearers: Stine Nielsen (opening); Line Kjaersfeldt (closing)
- Medals Ranked 16th: Gold 4 Silver 3 Bronze 5 Total 12

European Games appearances (overview)
- 2015; 2019; 2023; 2027

Denmark competed at the 2015 European Games, in Baku, Azerbaijan from 12 to 28 June 2015.

The National Olympic Committee and Sports Confederation of Denmark has of April 2015 selected 25 athletes for the Danish team.

== Medalists ==
Medal	Name	Sport	Event	Date
Gold	Mathias Boe; Carsten Mogensen	Badminton	Men's doubles	27 June
Gold	Simone Christensen	Cycling	Women's BMX	28 June
Gold	Niclas Nøhr; Sara Thygesen	Badminton	Mixed doubles	28 June
Gold	Line Kjærsfeldt	Badminton	Women's singles	28 June
Silver	Maja Jager	Archery	Women's individual	21 June
Silver	Stine Nielsen; Steffen Olsen	Shooting	Mixed 10 metre air rifle	22 June
Silver	Emil Holst	Badminton	Men's singles	28 June
Bronze	René Holten Poulsen	Canoe sprint	Men's K1-1000m	15 June
Bronze	Lena Grebak; Maria Helsbøl	Badminton	Women's doubles	27 June
Bronze	Tobias Bjerg	Swimming	Men's 50 metre breaststroke	25 June
Bronze	Julie Kepp Jensen	Swimming	Women's 50 metre freestyle	26 June
Bronze	Julie Kepp Jensen	Swimming	Women's 50 metre butterfly	27 June

== Archery ==
Athlete	Event	Ranking round		Round of 64	Round of 32	Round of 16	Quarterfinals	Semifinals	Final / BM	
Athlete	Event	Score	Seed	Opposition Score	Opposition Score	Opposition Score	Opposition Score	Opposition Score	Opposition Score	Rank
Johan Weiss	Men's individual	651	34	Ciornei (Romania); W 6–0	van der Ven (Netherlands); L 3–7	Did not advance				17
Maja Jager	Women's individual	657	2	Bye	Senyuk (Azerbaijan); W 7–3	Schuh (France); W 6–4	Sichenikova (Ukraine); W 6–1	Marin (Spain); W 6–1	Winter (Germany); L 2–6	2nd place, silver medalist(s)
Carina Rosenvinge	Women's individual	627	35	Lobzhenidze (Georgia (country)); L 5–6	Did not advance					33
Natasja Bech	Women's individual	623	37	Psarra (Greece); L 2–6	Did not advance					33
Maja Jager; Carina Rosenvinge; Natasja Bech	Women's team	1907	6	—		Poland W 5–4	Italy L 4–5	Did not advance		5
Maja Jager; Johan Weiss	Mixed team	1308	9	—		Netherlands L 0–6	Did not advance			9

== Boxing ==
- Men's 56 kg – Frederik Lundgaard Jensen
- Men's 75 kg – Mike Steffensen
- Men's 91 kg – Jim Hassenteufel Andreasen
- Women's 64 kg – Camilla Skov Jensen

== Canoeing ==
- Men's K1 – René Holten Poulsen

== Cycling ==
=== BMX ===
- Men's race – Niklas Laustsen, Klaus Bøgh Andresen
- Women's race – Simone Tetsche Christensen

== Diving ==
- Men's events – Andreas Sargent Larsen, Martin Christensen

== Fencing ==
- Men's individual épée – Frederik von der Osten
- Men's individual foil – Alexander Bøgeskov-Tsoronis

== Gymnastics ==
=== Artistic ===
- Men's – Helge Vammen
- Women's – Mette Hulgaard, Michelle Vitting Lauritsen, Linnea Højer Wang

== Judo ==
- Men's 100 kg – Frederik Jørgensen

== Karate ==
- Men's kata – Christopher Skotte Rohde Christensen

== Swimming ==
- Men's – Frederik Jessen, Philip Alfred Ravnsholt Greve, Tobias Bjerg
- Women's – Emily Rosemary Gantriis, Helena Rosendahl Bach, Josefine Brosolat Pedersen, Josephine Marie Holm, Julie Kepp Jensen, Merete Toft Jensen, Signe Wiegant Bro, Trine Kjøngerskov, Victoria Christine Bierre

== Table tennis ==
- Men's singles – Jonathan Groth

== Taekwondo ==
- Women's 49 kg – Sarah Malykke

== Triathlon ==
- Men's – Casper Stenderup

== Volleyball ==
=== Beach ===
- Men's – Peter Kildegaard Andersen / Kristoffer Abell
- Women's – Helle Søndergård / Line Trans Hansen
