= Germany at the 2015 European Games =

- IOC code: GER
- NOC: German Olympic Sports Confederation
- Website: www.dosb.de

in Baku, Azerbaijan 12 – 28 June 2015
- Competitors: 265 in 16 sports
- Flag bearer: Fabian Hambüchen
- Medals Ranked 4th: Gold 16 Silver 17 Bronze 33 Total 66

European Games appearances (overview)
- 2015; 2019; 2023; 2027

Germany participated at the 2015 European Games, in Baku, Azerbaijan from 12 to 28 June 2015.

== Medalists ==
Medal	Name	Sport	Event	Date
Gold	Max Hoff	Canoe sprint	Men's K1-1000m	15 June
Gold	Sebastian Brendel	Canoe sprint	Men's C1-1000m	15 June
Gold	Han Ying; Shan Xiaona; Petrissa Solja	Table Tennis	Women's Team	15 June
Gold	Max Hoff	Canoe sprint	Men's K1-5000m	16 June
Gold	Henri Junghänel	Shooting	Men's 50m rifle prone	18 June
Gold	Karina Winter	Archery	Women's individual	19 June
Gold	Dimitrij Ovtcharov	Table Tennis	Men's singles	19 June
Gold	Louisa Stawczynski; Saskia Oettinghaus	Diving	Women's 3 metre synchronized springboard	20 June
Gold	Fabian Hambüchen	Gymnastics	Men's horizontal bar	20 June
Gold	Christian Reitz	Shooting	Men's 25 metre rapid fire pistol	21 June
Gold	Christian Reitz; Monika Karsch	Shooting	Mixed 10 metre air pistol	22 June
Gold	Paul Hentschel	Swimming	Men's 400 metre freestyle	23 June
Gold	Julia Mrozinski	Swimming	Women's 200 m butterfly	24 June
Gold	Martyna Trajdos	Judo	Women's 63 kg	26 June
Gold	Maxime Wolters	Swimming	Women's 200 m individual medley	26 June
Gold	Christian Fromm; Sebastian Kühner; Denys Kaliberda; Marcus Böhme; Jochen Schöps; Lukas Kampa; Ferdinand Tille; Tom Strohbach; Tim Broshog; Jan Zimmermann; Michael Andrei; Björn Höhne; Matthias Pompe; Falko Steinke	Volleyball	Men's tournament	28 June
Silver	Jonathan Horne	Karate	Men's +84 kg	14 June
Silver	Franziska Weber; Conny Wassmuth; Verena Hantl; Tina Dietze	Canoe sprint	Women's K4-500m	15 June
Silver	Max Rendschmidt; Marcus Gross	Canoe sprint	Men's K2-1000m	15 June
Silver	Leah Griesser; Sophie Scheder; Elisabeth Seitz	Gymnastics	Women's artistic team all-around	15 June
Silver	Ronald Rauhe; Tim Liebscher	Canoe sprint	Men's K2-200m	16 June
Silver	Marcel Ewald	Wrestling	Men's Freestyle 57 kg	17 June
Silver	Louisa Stawczynski	Diving	Women's 1 metre springboard	19 June
Silver	Fabian Hambüchen	Gymnastics	Men's floor exercise	20 June
Silver	Sophie Scheder	Gymnastics	Women's uneven bars	20 June
Silver	Laura Kelsch	Swimming	Women's 50 metre breaststroke	23 June
Silver	Leonie Kullmann	Swimming	Women's 400 metre freestyle	24 June
Silver	Maxime Wolters	Swimming	Women's 200 metre backstroke	25 June
Silver	Marek Ulrich	Swimming	Men's 50 metre backstroke	26 June
Silver	Laura Vargas Koch	Judo	Women's 70 kg	26 June
Silver	Luise Malzahn	Judo	Women's 78 kg	27 June
Silver	Jasmin Külbs	Judo	Women's +78 kg	27 June
Silver	Szaundra Diedrich; Franziska Konitz; Mareen Kraeh; Luise Malzahn; Miryam Roper; Martyna Trajdos; Laura Vargas Koch; Viola Waechter	Judo	Women's team	28 June
Bronze	Frank Stäbler	Wrestling	Men's Greco-Roman 71 kg	13 June
Bronze	Ramsin Azizsir	Wrestling	Men's Greco-Roman 85 kg	14 June
Bronze	Peter Kretschmer; Michael Müller	Canoe sprint	Men's C2-1000m	15 June
Bronze	Levent Tuncat	Taekwondo	Men's 58 kg	15 June
Bronze	Aline Focken	Wrestling	Women's Freestyle 69 kg	15 June
Bronze	Barbara Engleder	Shooting	Women's 10m air rifle	16 June
Bronze	Elena Wassen	Diving	Women's 10m platform	18 June
Bronze	Frithjof Seidel; Nico Herzog	Diving	Men's 3 metre synchronized springboard	19 June
Bronze	Martin Gromowski; Kyrylo Sonn	Gymnastics	Men's trampoline synchronized	19 June
Bronze	Monika Karsch	Shooting	Women's 25 metre pistol	20 June
Bronze	Saskia Oettinghaus	Diving	Women's 3 metre springboard	21 June
Bronze	Oliver Geis	Shooting	Men's 25 metre rapid fire pistol	21 June
Bronze	Konstantin Walter; Alexander Lohmar; Leonie Kullmann; Katrin Gottwald	Swimming	Mixed 4 × 100 metre freestyle relay	24 June
Bronze	Sebastian Seidl	Judo	Men's 66 kg	25 June
Bronze	Mareen Kräh	Judo	Women's 52 kg	25 June
Bronze	Miryam Roper	Judo	Women's 57 kg	25 June
Bronze	Romona Brussig	Judo	Women's Visually impaired 57 kg	25 June
Bronze	Sarah Scheurich	Boxing	Women's 75 kg	25 June
Bronze	Hamza Touba	Boxing	Men's 49 kg	26 June
Bronze	Kastriot Sopa	Boxing	Men's 64 kg	26 June
Bronze	Azize Nimani	Boxing	Women's 54 kg	26 June
Bronze	Richard Hübers; Björn Hübner; Maximilian Kindler; Robin Schrödter	Fencing	Men's team sabre	26 June
Bronze	Alexander Wierczeczak	Judo	Men's 81 kg	26 June
Bronze	Szaundra Diedrich	Judo	Women's 70 kg	26 June
Bronze	Maxine Wolters; Leo Schmidt; Johannes Tesch; Katrin Gottwald	Swimming	Mixed 4 × 100 metre medley relay	26 June
Bronze	Henning Muehlleitner	Swimming	Men's 800 metre freestyle	26 June
Bronze	Leonie Kollmann	Swimming	Women's 200 metre freestyle	26 June
Bronze	Marek Ulrich	Swimming	Men's 100 metre backstroke	26 June
Bronze	Henning Muehlleitner; Paul Hentschel; Konstantin Walter; Moritz Brandt	Swimming	Men's 4 × 200 metre freestyle relay	27 June
Bronze	Tasheena Bugar	Boxing	Women's 60 kg	27 June
Bronze	Andreas Heinz; Raphael Beck	Badminton	Men's doubles	27 June
Bronze	Dieter Domke	Badminton	Men's singles	28 June
Bronze	Kira Kattenbeck; Raphael Beck	Badminton	Mixed doubles	28 June

== Archery ==
Germany qualified for three quota places in both the men's and the women's archery events at the Games, and as a result also qualified for the team events.

Athlete	Event	Ranking round		Round of 64	Round of 32	Round of 16	Quarterfinals	Semifinals	Final / BM	
Athlete	Event	Score	Seed	Opposition Score	Opposition Score	Opposition Score	Opposition Score	Opposition Score	Opposition Score	Rank
Florian Kahllund	Men's individual	674	5	Grischke (Liechtenstein); W 6–0	Fernandez (Spain); W 6–4	Alvariño (Spain); L 3–7	Did not advance			9
Christian Weiss	Men's individual	657	27	Skalberg (Sweden); W 6–2	Plihon (France); L 4–6	Did not advance				17
Simon Nesemann	Men's individual	654	30	Hristov (Bulgaria); L 2–6	Did not advance					33
Lisa Unruh	Women's individual	662	1	Bye	Zuranska (Poland); W 7–1	Tonetta (Italy); L 2–6	Did not advance			9
Karina Winter	Women's individual	646	9	Deineko (Switzerland); W 6–0	Unsal (Turkey); W 6–5	Erdyniyeva (Russia); W 7–1	Tonetta (Italy); W 7–1	Psarra (Greece); W 6–2	Jager (Denmark); W 6–2	1st place, gold medalist(s)
Elena Richter	Women's individual	644	11	Kreicberga (Latvia); W 6–0	Marusava (Belarus); W 6–2	Sartori (Italy); L 4–6	Did not advance			9
Florian Kahllund; Christian Weiss; Simon Nesemann	Men's team	1985	6	—N/a		Norway W 5–1	France L 3–5	Did not advance		5
Lisa Unruh; Karina Winter; Elena Richter	Women's team	1952	1	—N/a		Azerbaijan W 6–0	Belarus L 2–6	Did not advance		5
Lisa Unruh; Florian Kahllund	Mixed team	1336	2	—N/a		Slovenia L 2–6	Did not advance			9

== Gymnastics ==
=== Aerobic ===
Two German athletes qualified after the performance at the 2013 Aerobic Gymnastics European Championships.

- Pairs – 1 pair of 2 athletes

=== Artistic ===
- Women's – 3 quota places

=== Trampoline ===
Two German athletes were qualified based on the results at the 2014 European Trampoline Championships. The gymnasts competed in both the individual and the synchronized event.

- Men's – 2 quota place
- Women's – 2 quota places

== Triathlon ==
- Men's – Jonas Breinlinger
- Women's – Lisa Sieburger
