= Serbia at the 2015 European Games =

- IOC code: SRB
- NOC: Olympic Committee of Serbia
- Website: www.oks.org.rs

in Baku, Azerbaijan 12 – 28 June 2015
- Competitors: 132 in 20 sports
- Flag bearers: (silver) Milica Mandić (opening); (bronze) Dušan Domović Bulut (closing)
- Medals Ranked 11th: Gold 8 Silver 4 Bronze 4 Total 16

European Games appearances (overview)
- 2015; 2019; 2023; 2027

Serbia participated at the 2015 European Games, in Baku, Azerbaijan from 12 to 28 June 2015.

The Olympic Committee of Serbia sent a total of 132 athletes to the Games, 79 men and 53 women, to compete in 20 sports. Volleyball, water polo and men's 3 on 3 basketball were the only team-based sports in which Serbia had its representation in these European games.

Notable Serbian athletes featured Olympic taekwondo champion Milica Mandić, who became the nation's flag bearer at the opening ceremony, olympic medalists in shooting Jasna Šekarić, Ivana Maksimović, Andrija Zlatić, Stevan Pletikosić. World number one ranked player in 3 on 3 basketball, Dušan Domović Bulut carried nation's flag at closing ceremony.

Serbia left Baku with a total of fifteen medals (eight gold, four silver, and three bronze) in nine sports. Shooting athletes won the most medals of all sports, four of which all being gold.

On July 1, 2015 Serbian president Tomislav Nikolić organized reception for athletes and coaches and congratulated them on success.

== Medalists ==
Medal	Name	Sport	Event	Date
Gold	Dalma Ružičić-Benedek; Milica Starović	Canoe sprint	Women's K-2 500m	16 June
Gold	Marko Novaković; Nebojša Grujić	Canoe sprint	Men's K-2 200m	16 June
Gold	Andrea Arsović	Shooting	Women's 10 metre air rifle	16 June
Gold	Zorana Arunović	Shooting	Women's 10 m air pistol	17 June
Gold	Damir Mikec	Shooting	Men's 10 m air pistol	17 June
Gold	Damir Mikec	Shooting	Men's 50 metre pistol	20 June
Gold	Men's junior national water polo team: Marko Janković; Petar Kasum; Jasmin Kolašinac; Nikola Lukić; Vladan Mitrović; Dragoljub Rogač; Kristian Šulc; Stefan Todorovski; Marko Tubić; Petar Velkić; Matija Vlahović; Đorđe Vučinić; Uroš Vuković	Water polo	Men's tournament	21 June
Gold	Ivana Jandrić	Sambo	Women's 68 kg	22 June
Silver	Viktor Nemeš	Wrestling	Men's Greco-Roman 75 kg	14 June
Silver	Nikolina Moldovan; Olivera Moldovan	Canoe sprint	Women's K-2 200m	16 June
Silver	Tijana Bogdanović	Taekwondo	Women's 49 kg	16 June
Silver	Milica Mandić	Taekwondo	Women's +67 kg	19 June
Bronze	Marko Dragosavljević	Canoe sprint	K-1 200 metres	16 June
Bronze	Anja Crevar	Swimming	400 m individual medley	23 June
Bronze	Serbia men's national 3x3 team: Marko Savić; Dušan Domović Bulut; Marko Ždero; Dejan Majstorović	Basketball (3x3)	Men's tournament	26 June
Bronze	Serbia women's national volleyball team: Ana Bjelica; Bianka Buša; Marta Drpa; Bojana Živković; Tijana Malešević; Brankica Mihajlović; Slađana Mirković; Brižitka Molnar; Jelena Nikolić; Mina Popović; Silvija Popović; Milena Rašić; Maja Savić; Jovana Stevanović	Volleyball	Women's tournament	27 June

Medals by sport
Sport	1st place, gold medalist(s)	2nd place, silver medalist(s)	3rd place, bronze medalist(s)	Total
Shooting	4	0	0	4
Canoeing	2	1	1	4
Sambo	1	0	0	1
Water polo	1	0	0	1
Taekwondo	0	2	0	2
Wrestling	0	1	0	1
Basketball (3x3)	0	0	1	1
Swimming	0	0	1	1
Volleyball	0	0	1	1
Total	8	4	4	16

== Archery ==
=== Men ===
Athlete	Event	Ranking round		Round of 64	Round of 32	Round of 16	Quarterfinals	Semifinals	Final / BM	
Athlete	Event	Score	Seed	Opposition Score	Opposition Score	Opposition Score	Opposition Score	Opposition Score	Opposition Score	Rank
Dragan Svilanović	Men's individual	593	61	Heorhiy Ivanytskyy (UKR); L 4–6	Did not advance					

== Badminton ==
=== Men ===
Athlete	Event	Group stage				Elimination	Quarterfinal	Semifinal	Final / BM	
Athlete	Event	Opposition Score	Opposition Score	Opposition Score	Rank	Opposition Score	Opposition Score	Opposition Score	Opposition Score	Rank
Igor Bjelan	Men's singles	Petr Koukal (CZE); L 0–2	Mathias Bonny (SUI); L 0–2	Emre Vural (TUR); L 1–2	4	Did not advance				

=== Women ===
Athlete	Event	Group stage				Elimination	Quarterfinal	Semifinal	Final / BM	
Athlete	Event	Opposition Score	Opposition Score	Opposition Score	Rank	Opposition Score	Opposition Score	Opposition Score	Opposition Score	Rank
Milica Simić	Women's singles	Line Kjaersfeldt (DEN); L 0–2	Sonia Goncalves (POR); L 0–2	Clara Azurmendi (ESP); L 0–2	4	Did not advance				

== Basketball (3x3) ==
=== Men's tournament ===
- Marko Savić
- Dušan Domović Bulut
- Marko Ždero
- Dejan Majstorović

==== Pool C ====
Pos	Team	Pld	W	L	PF	PA	PD	Pts	Qualification
1	Serbia	3	3	0	61	48	+13	6	Qualification to Round of 16
2	Greece	3	2	1	47	47	0	4	Qualification to Round of 16
3	Italy	3	1	2	44	43	+1	2	Qualification to Round of 16
4	Estonia	3	0	3	44	58	−14	0	Qualification to Round of 16

First match(es) will be played: 23 June 2015. Source: baku2015.com

23 Jun, 2015
19:55

Game 1

Serbia	21–14	Italy

Basketball Arena, Baku

24 Jun, 2015
16:45

Game 2

Serbia	18–17	Estonia

Basketball Arena, Baku

24 Jun, 2015
21:35

Game 3

Serbia	22–17	Greece

Basketball Arena, Baku

==== Round of 16 ====
25 Jun, 2015
17:30

Serbia	21–13	Turkey

Basketball Arena, Baku

==== Quarter-final ====
25 Jun, 2015
22:00

Serbia	17–11	Lithuania

Basketball Arena, Baku

==== Semi-final ====
26 Jun, 2015
18:00

Serbia	16–19	Spain

Basketball Arena, Baku

==== Bronze-medal match ====
26 Jun, 2015
20:00

(bronze) Serbia	21–14	Slovenia

Basketball Arena, Baku

== Boxing ==
=== Men ===
Athlete	Event	Round of 32	Round of 16	Quarterfinals	Semifinals	Final	
Athlete	Event	Opposition Result	Opposition Result	Opposition Result	Opposition Result	Opposition Result	Rank
Aleksandar Drenovak	Middleweight	Salvatore Cavallaro (ITA); L 0–3	Did not advance				

=== Women ===
Athlete	Event	Round of 16	Quarterfinals	Semifinals	Final	
Athlete	Event	Opposition Result	Opposition Result	Opposition Result	Opposition Result	Rank
Jelena Jelić	Lightweight	Vivien Csombor (HUN); W 2–0	Tasheena Bugar (GER); L 0–3	Did not advance		

== Canoeing ==
=== Sprint ===
==== Men ====
Athlete	Event	Heats		Semifinals		Finals	
Athlete	Event	Time	Rank	Time	Rank	Time	Rank
Marko Dragosavljević	Men's K1 200m	35.309	3	34.881	1	35.842	3rd place, bronze medalist(s)
Marko Tomićević	Men's K1 1000m	3:41.142	2	3:24.651	3	3:35.132	8
Milenko Zorić	Men's K1 5000m	—N/a				21:46.941	11
Nebojša Grujić; Marko Novaković	Men's K2 200m	31.582	1	—N/a		31.910	1st place, gold medalist(s)
Simo Boltić; Vladimir Torubarov	Men's K2 1000m	3:22.381	9	Did not advance			
Simo Boltić; Vladimir Torubarov; Ervin Holpert; Dejan Terzić	Men's K4 1000m	2:52.417	4	2:50.640	2	3:10.740	6

==== Women ====
Athlete	Event	Heats		Semifinals		Finals	
Athlete	Event	Time	Rank	Time	Rank	Time	Rank
Nikolina Moldovan	Women's K1 200m	41.903	4	39.653	1	42.007	5
Nikolina Moldovan	Women's K1 500m	1:54.999	3	1:47.856	1	2:08.447	7
Nikolina Moldovan	Women's K1 5000m	Did not start					
Olivera Moldovan; Nikolina Moldovan	Women's K2 200m	37.274	1	—N/a		37.699	2nd place, silver medalist(s)
Dalma Ružičić-Benedek; Milica Starović	Women's K2 500m	1:38.191	1	—N/a		1:49.904	1st place, gold medalist(s)
Dalma Ružičić-Benedek; Milica Starović; Olivera Moldovan; Nikolina Moldovan	Women's K4 500m	1:34.019	2	—N/a		1:34.398	5

== Cycling ==
=== Road ===
==== Men ====
Athlete	Event	Time	Rank
Miloš Borisavljević	Men's road race	DNF	
Gabor Kasa	Men's road race	DNF	
Gabor Kasa	Men's individual time trial	1:08:55.55	34

=== Mountain biking ===
==== Women ====
Athlete	Event	Time	Rank
Jovana Crnogorac	Women's cross-country	LAP	19

== Diving ==
=== Men ===
Athlete	Event	Preliminaries		Final	
Athlete	Event	Points	Rank	Points	Rank
Mihailo Ćurić	1 m springboard	325.65	28	Did not advance	

== Fencing ==
=== Women ===
Athlete	Event	Pool round		Round of 32	Round of 16	Quarterfinal	Semifinal	Final / BM	
Athlete	Event	Score	Group Ranking	Opposition Score	Opposition Score	Opposition Score	Opposition Score	Opposition Score	Rank
Romana Caran	Women's individual épée	2–4	5	Anna Kun (HUN); L 7–15	Did not advance				

== Gymnastics ==
=== Artistic ===
==== Men ====
Athlete	Event	Final							
Athlete	Event	Apparatus						Total	Rank
Athlete	Event	F	PH	R	V	PB	HB	Total	Rank
Bojan Dejanović	Team	13.233	DSC	DSC	14.200	13.400	13.366	Total	Rank
Miloš Paunović	Team	DSC	12.433	13.466	DSC	13.833	12.633	Total	Rank
Petar Veličković	Team	13.633	12.833	11.733	13.333	DSC	DSC	Total	Rank
Total	Team	26.866	25.266	25.199	27.533	27.233	25.999	158.096	20

==== Women ====
Athlete	Event	Qualification						Final					
Athlete	Event	Apparatus				Total	Rank	Apparatus				Total	Rank
Athlete	Event	F	V	UB	BB	Total	Rank	F	V	UB	BB	Total	Rank
Aleksandra Rajčić	All-around	11.066	12.800	11.933	10.300	46.099	59	Did not advance					

== Judo ==
=== Men ===
Athlete	Event	Round of 32	Round of 16	Quarterfinals	Semifinals	Repechage	Final / BM	
Athlete	Event	Opposition Result	Opposition Result	Opposition Result	Opposition Result	Opposition Result	Opposition Result	Rank
Ilija Ciganović	66 kg	Dzmitry Shershan (BLR); L 0s1–100s1	Did not advance					
Marko Vukićević	66 kg	Kamal Khan-Magomedov (RUS); L 0s1–101s1	Did not advance					
Ljubiša Kovačević	73 kg	Tommy Macias (SWE); W 100–0	Nugzari Tatalashvili (GEO); L 0s2–100	Did not advance				
Nemanja Majdov	81 kg	Alan Khubetsov (RUS); L 0s2–10s2	Did not advance					
Dmitrij Gerasimenko	90 kg	David Klammert (CZE); W 100s2–0s2	Beka Gviniashvili (GEO); L 0–100	Did not advance				
Aleksandar Kukolj	90 kg	Aleksandr Marmeljuk (EST); W 100–0s1	Quedjau Nhabali (UKR); W 100–0s1	Krisztian Toth (HUN); L 0s1–101s1	Did not advance	Ilias Iliadis (GRE); L 0s3–0s2	Did not advance	7
Stefan Jurišić	100 kg	Domenico Di Guida (ITA); L 0–100	Did not advance					
Božidar Božinić	+100 kg	Burak Serbest (TUR); W 100s1–0	Renat Saidov (RUS); L 0–100	Did not advance				

=== Women ===
Athlete	Event	Round of 32	Round of 16	Quarterfinals	Semifinals	Repechage	Final / BM	
Athlete	Event	Opposition Result	Opposition Result	Opposition Result	Opposition Result	Opposition Result	Opposition Result	Rank
Jovana Rogić	57 kg	Kifayat Gasimova (AZE); W 0s2–0s3	Telma Monteiro (POR); L 0s3–0s2	Did not advance				

== Karate ==
=== Men ===
Athlete	Event	Group stage			Semifinal	Final / BM	
Athlete	Event	Opposition Score	Opposition Score	Opposition Score	Opposition Score	Opposition Score	Rank
Marko Antić	60 kg	Sofiane Agoudjil (FRA); W 1 – 0	Evgeny Plakhutin (RUS); W 2 – 0	Emil Pavlov (MKD); D 0 – 0	Luca Maresca (ITA); L 2 – 6	Emil Pavlov (MKD); L 0 – 2	4th
Slobodan Bitević	+84 kg	Filipe Reis (POR); W 2 – 1	Moreno Sheppard (NED); W 1 – 0	Jonathan Horne (GER); L 0 – 3	Enes Erkan (TUR); L 1 – 2	Martin Nestorovski (MKD); L 0 – 8	4th

=== Women ===
Athlete	Event	Group stage			Semifinal	Final / BM	
Athlete	Event	Opposition Score	Opposition Score	Opposition Score	Opposition Score	Opposition Score	Rank
Branka Aranđelović	55 kg	Christina Ferrer Garcia (ESP); L 0 – 1	Emilie Thouy (FRA); L 0 – 3	Bettina Alstadsaether (DEN); W 4 – 0	Did not advance		

== Sambo ==
=== Women ===
Athlete	Event	Quarterfinal	Semifinal	Final / BM	
Athlete	Event	Opposition Score	Opposition Score	Opposition Score	Rank
Ivana Jandrić	68 kg	Natalia Repesco (ROM); W 4 – 0	Olga Zakhartsova (RUS); W 4 – 0	Volha Namazava (BLR); W 2 – 0	1st place, gold medalist(s)

== Shooting ==
=== Men ===
Athlete	Event	Qualification		Final	
Athlete	Event	Points	Rank	Points	Rank
Dimitrije Grgić	10 m air pistol	576	16	Did not advance	
Damir Mikec	10 m air pistol	579	8	201.8	1st place, gold medalist(s)
Damir Mikec	50 m pistol	567	1	192	1st place, gold medalist(s)
Nemanja Mirosavljev	50 m rifle prone	614.0	16	Did not advance	
Nemanja Mirosavljev	50 m rifle three positions	1146	18	Did not advance	
Stevan Pletikosić	10 m air rifle	618.5	30	Did not advance	
Milenko Sebić	50 m rifle prone	614.3	14	Did not advance	
Milenko Sebić	50 m rifle three positions	1146	18	Did not advance	
Milutin Stefanović	10 m air rifle	622.8	17	Did not advance	
Andrija Zlatić	50 m pistol	522	29	Did not advance	

=== Women ===
Athlete	Event	Qualification		Final	
Athlete	Event	Points	Rank	Points	Rank
Andrea Arsović	10 m air rifle	415.9	4	207.8	1st place, gold medalist(s)
Andrea Arsović	50 m rifle three positions	576	20	Did not advance	
Zorana Arunović	10 m air pistol	388	4	199.5	1st place, gold medalist(s)
Zorana Arunović	25 m pistol	575	18	Did not advance	
Ivana Maksimović	10 m air rifle	415.7	6	123.1	6
Ivana Maksimović	50 m rifle three positions	579	8	430.4	4
Jasna Šekarić	25 m pistol	575	17	Did not advance	
Bobana Veličković	10 m air pistol	379	14	Did not advance	

=== Mixed ===
Athlete	Event	Qualification		Semifinal		Final / BM	
Athlete	Event	Points	Rank	Points	Rank	Points	Rank
Dimitrije Grgić; Bobana Veličković	Air 50 pistol	481	2	156.4	4	Did not advance	
Milutin Stefanović; Andrea Arsović	Air 50 rifle	518	7	247.5	2	3	4

== Swimming ==
=== Men ===
Athlete	Event	Heat		Semifinal		Final	
Athlete	Event	Time	Rank	Time	Rank	Time	Rank
Andrej Barna	50 m freestyle	23.22	10	22.94	6	22.95	6
Andrej Barna	100 m freestyle	50.50	2	50.54	5	50.65	8
Andrej Barna	200 m freestyle	1:55.07	38	Did not advance			
Matija Pucarević	100 m freestyle	52.33	46	Did not advance			
Matija Pucarević	50 m butterfly	25.83	44	Did not advance			
Matija Pucarević	100 m butterfly	56.88	41	Did not advance			

=== Women ===
Athlete	Event	Heat		Semifinal		Final	
Athlete	Event	Time	Rank	Time	Rank	Time	Rank
Anja Crevar	400 m freestyle	4:30.14	31	—N/a		Did not advance	
Anja Crevar	200 m individual medley	2:17.23	3	2:16.56	6	2:15.92	6
Anja Crevar	400 m individual medley	4:50.43	4	—N/a		4:45.84	3rd place, bronze medalist(s)
Mila Medić	50 m breaststroke	33.77	22	Did not advance			
Mila Medić	100 m breaststroke	1:13.90	25	Did not advance			
Mila Medić	200 m breaststroke	2:39.15	22	Did not advance			

== Table tennis ==
=== Men ===
Athlete	Event	Round 1	Round 2	Round of 16	Quarterfinals	Semifinals	Final / BM	
Athlete	Event	Opposition Score	Opposition Score	Opposition Score	Opposition Score	Opposition Score	Opposition Score	Rank
Aleksandar Karakašević	Singles	Wang (SVK); L 3–4	Did not advance					

=== Women ===
Athlete	Event	Round 1	Round 2	Round of 16	Quarterfinals	Semifinals	Final / BM	
Athlete	Event	Opposition Score	Opposition Score	Opposition Score	Opposition Score	Opposition Score	Opposition Score	Rank
Anamaria Erdelji	Singles	Giardi (SMR); W 4–0	Solja (GER); L 2–4	Did not advance				
Gabriela Feher	Singles	Grzybowska (POL); W 4–2	Polcanova (AUT); L 0–4	Did not advance				
Anamaria Erdelji; Gabriela Feher; Andrea Todorović	Team	—N/a		Netherlands (NED); L 0–3	Did not advance			

== Taekwondo ==
=== Men ===
Athlete	Event	Round of 16	Quarterfinals	Semifinals	Repechage	Bronze medal	Final	
Athlete	Event	Opposition Result	Opposition Result	Opposition Result	Opposition Result	Opposition Result	Opposition Result	Rank
Miloš Gladović	58 kg	Stepan Dimitrov (MDA); W 8 – 7	Rui Bragança (POR); L 7 – 13	Did not advance	Görkem Sezer (TUR); W 9 – 8	Levent Tuncat (GER); L 1 – 6	Did not advance	5
Damir Fejzić	80 kg	Milad Beigi (AZE); L 0 – 12	did not advance		Lutalo Muhammad (GBR); L 7 – 8	did not advance		7

=== Women ===
Athlete	Event	Round of 16	Quarterfinals	Semifinals	Repechage	Bronze medal	Final	
Athlete	Event	Opposition Result	Opposition Result	Opposition Result	Opposition Result	Opposition Result	Opposition Result	Rank
Tijana Bogdanović	49 kg	Indra Craen (BEL); W 9 – 5	Lucija Zaninović (CRO); W 2 – 1	Patimat Abakarova (AZE); W 7 – 6	—N/a		Charlie Maddock (GBR); L 9 – 10	2nd place, silver medalist(s)
Dragana Gladović	57 kg	Gunay Aghakishiyeva (AZE); W 8 – 4	Ana Zaninovic (CRO); L 1 – 14	Did not advance	Ekaterina Kim (RUS); W WDR	Nikita Glasnovic (SWE); L 0 – 7	Did not advance	5
Ana Bajić	67 kg	Nur Tatar (TUR); L 3 – 5	did not advance					
Milica Mandić	+67 kg	Andela Popovic (MNE); W 11 – 1	Rosanna Simon Alamo (ESP); W 12 – 3	Maryna Konieva (UKR); W 15 – 1	—N/a		Gwladys Épangue (FRA); L 8 – 9	2nd place, silver medalist(s)

== Triathlon ==
=== Men ===
Athlete	Event	Swim (1.5 km)	Trans 1	Bike (40 km)	Trans 2	Run (10 km)	Total Time	Rank
Ognjen Stojanović	Men's	19:31	00:45	57:38	00:27	33:08	1:51:29	18

== Volleyball ==
=== Men's tournament ===
- Maksim Buculjević
- Konstantin Čupković
- Milorad Kapur
- Milan Katić
- Lazar Koprivica
- Petar Krsmanović
- Dražen Luburić
- Mihajlo Mitić
- Marko Nikolić
- Dušan Petković
- Dejan Radić
- Milan Rašić
- Goran Škundrić
- Filip Stoilović

==== Pool A ====
Pos	Team	Pld	W	L	Pts	SW	SL	SR	SPW	SPL	SPR	Qualification
1	Poland	5	5	0	12	15	6	2.500	464	401	1.157	Quarterfinals
2	France	5	4	1	12	14	5	2.800	431	381	1.131	Quarterfinals
3	Turkey	5	3	2	9	11	9	1.222	449	414	1.085	Quarterfinals
4	Serbia	5	2	3	8	11	9	1.222	430	419	1.026	Quarterfinals
5	Finland	5	1	4	2	3	14	0.214	334	403	0.829	
6	Azerbaijan	5	0	5	2	4	15	0.267	356	446	0.798	

Date	Time		Score		Set 1	Set 2	Set 3	Set 4	Set 5	Total	Report
14 Jun	11:00	Serbia	1–3	Turkey	15–25	25–21	20–25	18–25		78–96	Report
16 Jun	22:00	Serbia	3–0	Azerbaijan	25–22	25–18	25–19			75–59	Report
18 Jun	22:00	Serbia	2–3	Poland	25–13	25–21	15–25	23–25	9–15	97–99	Report
20 Jun	14:30	Serbia	3–0	Finland	25–16	28–26	25–20			78–62	Report
22 Jun	16:30	Serbia	2–3	France	25–21	25–17	23–25	18–25	11–15	102–103	Report

==== Quarterfinals ====
Date	Time		Score		Set 1	Set 2	Set 3	Set 4	Set 5	Total	Report
24 Jun	19:00	Serbia	0–3	Germany	24–26	24–26	17–25			65–77	Report

=== Women's tournament ===
- Ana Bjelica
- Bianka Buša
- Marta Drpa
- Bojana Živković
- Tijana Malešević
- Brankica Mihajlović
- Slađana Mirković
- Brižitka Molnar
- Jelena Nikolić
- Mina Popović
- Silvija Popović
- Milena Rašić
- Maja Savić
- Jovana Stevanović

==== Pool B ====
Pos	Team	Pld	W	L	Pts	SW	SL	SR	SPW	SPL	SPR	Qualification
1	Serbia	5	4	1	13	14	4	3.500	426	359	1.187	Quarterfinals
2	Netherlands	5	4	1	11	12	7	1.714	432	405	1.067	Quarterfinals
3	Germany	5	3	2	9	12	8	1.500	428	434	0.986	Quarterfinals
4	Russia	5	2	3	5	7	11	0.636	392	406	0.966	Quarterfinals
5	Bulgaria	5	1	4	4	6	12	0.500	390	404	0.965	
6	Croatia	5	1	4	3	4	13	0.308	352	412	0.854	

Date	Time		Score		Set 1	Set 2	Set 3	Set 4	Set 5	Total	Report
13 Jun	09:00	Serbia	3–0	Croatia	25–15	25–17	25–17			75–49	Report
15 Jun	20:00	Serbia	3–1	Germany	26–24	18–25	25–15	25–22		94–86	Report
17 Jun	14:30	Serbia	3–0	Bulgaria	27–25	25–12	25–18			77–55	Report
19 Jun	14:30	Serbia	2–3	Netherlands	25–20	22–25	28–26	16–25	9–15	100–111	Report
21 Jun	22:00	Serbia	3–0	Russia	30–28	25–14	25–16			80–58	Report

==== Quarterfinals ====
Date	Time		Score		Set 1	Set 2	Set 3	Set 4	Set 5	Total	Report
23 Jun	21:00	Serbia	3–2	Belgium	25–22	19–25	25–14	21–25	19–17	109–103	Report

==== Semifinals ====
Date	Time		Score		Set 1	Set 2	Set 3	Set 4	Set 5	Total	Report
25 Jun	17:00	Serbia	2–3	Poland	23–25	25–20	19–25	25–22	12–15	104–107	Report

==== Third place ====
Date	Time		Score		Set 1	Set 2	Set 3	Set 4	Set 5	Total	Report
27 Jun	16:00	(bronze) Serbia	3–2	Azerbaijan	21–25	25–19	17–25	25–14	15–9	103–92	Report

== Water polo ==
=== Men's tournament ===
- Marko Janković
- Petar Kasum
- Jasmin Kolašinac
- Nikola Lukić
- Vladan Mitrović
- Dragoljub Rogač
- Kristian Šulc
- Stefan Todorovski
- Marko Tubić
- Petar Velkić
- Matija Vlahović
- Đorđe Vučinić
- Uroš Vuković

==== Group D ====
Pos	Team	Pld	W	D	L	GF	GA	GD	Pts	
1	Spain	3	3	0	0	46	22	+24	9	Qualification to quarterfinals
2	Serbia	3	2	0	1	41	18	+23	6	Qualification to play-offs
3	Slovakia	3	1	0	2	29	36	−7	3	Qualification to play-offs
4	Malta	3	0	0	3	15	55	−40	0	

First match(es) will be played: 13 June 2015. Source: baku2015.com

13 Jun 2015; 11:15	Game 1	Serbia	14–5	Slovakia	Baku

14 Jun 2015; 16:45	Game 2	Serbia	9–10	Spain	Baku

15 Jun 2015; 09:30	Game 3	Serbia	18–3	Malta	Baku

==== Play-off ====
16 Jun 2015; 19:45	Play-off	Serbia	8–2	Romania	Baku

==== Quarter-final ====
17 Jun 2015; 19:45	Quarter Final	Serbia	8–7	Italy	Baku

==== Semi-final ====
19 Jun 2015; 20:30	Semi Final	Serbia	13–12	Greece	Baku

==== Final ====
21 Jun 2015; 19:30	Final	(gold) Serbia	8–7	Spain	Baku

=== Women's tournament ===
- Isidora Damnjanović
- Julijana Ilić
- Nina Josifović
- Vivien Juhas
- Janja Kaplarević
- Lara Luka
- Andrea Marković
- Anja Mišković
- Nađa Novaković
- Anđela Petrović
- Teodora Rudić
- Aleksandra Ružić
- Ljubica Vojinović

==== Group B ====
Pos	Team	Pld	W	D	L	GF	GA	GD	Pts	
1	Russia	5	4	1	0	89	29	+60	13	Qualification to Semifinals
2	Spain	5	4	0	1	75	33	+42	12	Qualification to Play-offs
3	Italy	5	3	1	1	76	37	+39	10	Qualification to Play-offs
4	Slovakia	5	2	0	3	33	64	−31	6	
5	France	5	1	0	4	27	83	−56	3	
6	Serbia	5	0	0	5	26	80	−54	0	

First match(es) will be played: 12 June 2015. Source: baku2015.com

12 Jun 2015; 13:45	Game 1	Serbia	4–17	Spain	Water Polo Arena, Baku

13 Jun 2015; 13:00	Game 2	Serbia	8–9	Slovakia	Water Polo Arena, Baku

14 Jun 2015; 13:00	Game 3	Serbia	4–17	Italy	Water Polo Arena, Baku

15 Jun 2015; 11:15	Game 4	Serbia	7–9	France	Water Polo Arena, Baku

16 Jun 2015; 16:00	Game 5	Serbia	3–28	Russia	Water Polo Arena, Baku

==== 7th–12th Place Classification ====
17 Jun 2015; 07:30	Quarter Final	Serbia	11–3	Great Britain	Water Polo Arena, Baku

18 Jun 2015; 14:30	Semi final	Serbia	6–10	Slovakia	Water Polo Arena, Baku

20 Jun 2015; 12:00	9th–10th place match	Serbia	7–3	France	Water Polo Arena, Baku

== Wrestling ==
=== Men ===
==== Men's freestyle ====
Athlete	Event	Qualification	Round of 16	Quarterfinal	Semifinal	Repechage 1	Repechage 2	Final / BM	
Athlete	Event	Opposition Result	Opposition Result	Opposition Result	Opposition Result	Opposition Result	Opposition Result	Opposition Result	Rank
Zaur Efendiev	70 kg	—N/a	Magomedrasul Gazimagomedov (RUS); L 1 – 3	did not advance		—N/a	Evgheni Nedealco (MDA); W 5 – 0	Yakup Gör (TUR); L 1 – 4	5

==== Men's Greco-Roman ====
Athlete	Event	Qualification	Round of 16	Quarterfinal	Semifinal	Repechage 1	Repechage 2	Final / BM	
Athlete	Event	Opposition Result	Opposition Result	Opposition Result	Opposition Result	Opposition Result	Opposition Result	Opposition Result	Rank
Kristijan Fris	59 kg	Jani Haapamäki (FIN); L 1 – 3	did not advance						
Aleksandar Maksimović	66 kg	Marius Thommesen (NOR); W 3 – 0	Abdulsamet Ugurli (TUR); W 5 – 0	Migran Arutyunyan (ARM); L 1 – 4	Did not advance	—N/a	Ismael Navarro Sanchez (ESP); W 3 – 0	Hasan Aliyev (AZE); L 0 – 3	5
Mate Nemeš	71 kg	—N/a	Yury Denisov (RUS); L 1 – 3	did not advance					
Viktor Nemeš	75 kg	Christoffer Nilsson (SWE); W 3 – 0	Ciro Russo (ITA); W 4 – 0	Pascal Eisele (GER); W 3 – 1	Dmytro Pyshkov (UKR); W 3 – 1	—N/a		Elvin Mursaliyev (AZE); L 1 – 3	2nd place, silver medalist(s)
Petar Balo	80 kg	—N/a	Alexander Jersgren (SWE); L 0 – 3	did not advance					
Dejan Franjković	85 kg	Zhan Beleniuk (UKR); L 0 – 4	did not advance			Attila Tamas (ROM); L 0 – 5	did not advance		
