= Spain at the 2015 European Games =

- IOC code: ESP
- NOC: Spanish Olympic Committee
- Website: www.coe.es

in Baku, Azerbaijan 12 – 28 June 2015
- Competitors: 207 in 22 sports
- Flag bearers: Joel González (opening); Pablo Abián (closing)
- Medals Ranked 10th: Gold 8 Silver 11 Bronze 11 Total 30

European Games appearances (overview)
- 2015; 2019; 2023; 2027

Spain competed at the 2015 European Games, in Baku, Azerbaijan from 12 to 28 June 2015.

== Medalists ==
Medal	Name	Sport	Event	Date
Gold	Damián Quintero	Karate	Men's Kata	14 June
Gold	Sandra Sánchez	Karate	Women's Kata	14 June
Gold	Fátima Gálvez	Shooting	Women's Trap	16 June
Gold	Rayderley Zapata	Gymnastics Artistic	Men's Floor	20 June
Gold	Vicente Lli; Sara Moreno	Gymnastics Aerobic	Mixed Pairs	21 June
Gold	Luis León Sánchez	Cycling	Men's road race	21 June
Gold	Miguel Alvariño	Archery	Men's Individual	22 June
Gold	Pablo Abián	Badminton	Men's singles	28 June
Silver	Julia Echeberria; Berta Ferreras; Helena Jauma; Carmen Juárez; Emilia Luboslavova; Raquel Navarro; Itziar Sánchez; Irene Toledano	Synchronised swimming	Team	15 June
Silver	Julia Echeberria; Berta Ferreras; Helena Jauma; Carmen Juárez; Emilia Luboslavova; Raquel Navarro; Itziar Sánchez; Sara Saldaña; Irene Toledano; Lidia Vigara	Synchronised swimming	Free Combination	15 June
Silver	Berta Ferreras	Synchronised swimming	Solo	16 June
Silver	Jesús Tortosa	Taekwondo	Men's 58 kg	16 June
Silver	Sonia Franquet	Shooting	Women's 10 m air pistol	17 June
Silver	Miguel Alvariño; Antonio Fernández; Juan Ignacio Rodríguez	Archery	Men's Team	18 June
Silver	Alejandra Aznar; Carmen Baringo; Alba Bonamusa; Paula Crespí; Helena Dalmases; Sandra Domene; Laura Gómez; Blanca Goset; Mireia Guiral; Paula Leitón; Elia Montoya; Anna Roldán; Paula Rutgers	Water polo	Women's Team	20 June
Silver	Oriol Albacete; Jordi Chico; Alex De la Fuente; Josu Fernández; Álvaro García; Pablo Gómez de la Puente; Álvaro Granados; Guillermo Palomar; Nikolas Paúl; Josep Puig; Oriol Rodríguez; Marc Salvador; Francisco Valera	Water polo	Men's Team	21 June
Silver	Marcos Rodríguez	Swimming	Men's 800 m freestyle	26 June
Silver	Sergio de la Fuente; Álex Llorca; Nacho Martín; Juan Vasco	3x3 Basketball	Men's tournament	26 June
Silver	Alberto Lozano	Swimming	Men's 100 m butterfly	27 June
Bronze	Maider Unda	wrestling	Women's 75 kg	16 June
Bronze	Eva Calvo	Taekwondo	Women's 57 kg	17 June
Bronze	Joel González	Taekwondo	Men's 68 kg	17 June
Bronze	Luis León Sánchez	Cycling	Men's time trial	18 June
Bronze	Daniel Ros	Taekwondo	Men's +80 kg	19 June
Bronze	Pedro Cabanas; Belen Guillemot; Vicente Lli; Aranzazu Martínez; Sara Moreno	Gymnastics Aerobic	Mixed Groups	21 June
Bronze	Alicia Marín	Archery	Women's Individual	21 June
Bronze	Marina Castro	Swimming	Women's 800 m freestyle	23 June
Bronze	Marina Castro	Swimming	Women's 1500 m freestyle	25 June
Bronze	Vega Gimeno; Arantxa Novo; Esther Montenegro; Inmaculada Zanoguera	3x3 Basketball	Women's tournament	26 June
Bronze	Clara Azurmendi	Badminton	Women's singles	27 June

== Archery ==
Men

Athlete	Event	Ranking round		Round of 64	Round of 32	Round of 16	Quarterfinals	Semifinals	Final / BM	
Athlete	Event	Score	Seed	Opposition Score	Opposition Score	Opposition Score	Opposition Score	Opposition Score	Opposition Score	Rank
Miguel Alvariño	Individual	666	12 Q	Karageorgiou (GRE); W 6–4	Ramaekers (BEL); W 6–0	Kahllund (GER); W 7–3	Ivanytskyy (UKR); W 6–5	Naploszek (POL); W 7–3	van den Berg (NED); W 7–1	1st place, gold medalist(s)
Antonio Fernández	Individual	650	37 Q	Bertschler (AUT); W 6–0	Kahllund (GER); L 4–6	Did not advance				
Juan Ignacio Rodríguez	Individual	659	24 Q	Hagen (NOR); W 6–2	Malavasic (SLO); L 1–7	Did not advance				
Miguel Alvariño; Antonio Fernández; Juan Ignacio Rodríguez	Team	1975	7 Q	—		Turkey (TUR); W 5–4	Belarus (BLR); W 6–0	France (FRA); W 5–4	Ukraine (UKR); L 4–5	2nd place, silver medalist(s)

Women

Athlete	Event	Ranking round		Round of 64	Round of 32	Round of 16	Quarterfinals	Semifinals	Final / BM	
Athlete	Event	Score	Seed	Opposition Score	Opposition Score	Opposition Score	Opposition Score	Opposition Score	Opposition Score	Rank
Miriam Alarcón	Individual	623	38 Q	De Vries (NED); W W/O	Sartori (ITA); L 4–6	Did not advance				
Alicia Marín	Individual	636	19 Q	Nurmsalu (EST); W 6–2	Ruggieri (FRA); W 6–5	Lobzhenidze (GEO); W 6–2	Sartori (ITA); W 6–2	Jager (NOR); L 1–7	Psarra (GRE); W 6–4	3rd place, bronze medalist(s)
Adriana Martín	Individual	629	29 Q	Danailova (BUL); W 6–4	Narimanidze (GEO); L 5–6	Did not advance				
Miriam Alarcón; Alicia Marín; Adriana Martín	Team	1888	8 Q	—		Belarus (BLR); L 3–5	Did not advance			

Mixed

Athlete	Event	Ranking round		Round of 64	Round of 32	Round of 16	Quarterfinals	Semifinals	Final / BM	
Athlete	Event	Score	Seed	Opposition Score	Opposition Score	Opposition Score	Opposition Score	Opposition Score	Opposition Score	Rank
Miguel Alvariño; Alicia Marín	Mixed Team	1302	11 Q	—		France (FRA); W 5–3	Georgia (GEO); L 4–5	Did not advance		

== Badminton ==
Men

Athlete	Event	Group stage		Round of 16	Quarterfinal	Semifinal	Final / BM	
Athlete	Event	Opposition Score	Rank	Opposition Score	Opposition Score	Opposition Score	Opposition Score	Rank
Pablo Abián	Singles	Utrosa (SLO) W 21–9, 21–12; Must (EST) W 21–19, 21–15; Domke (GER) L 17–21, 17–21	2 Q	Malkov (RUS); W 25–23, 19–21, 21–15	Đurkinjak (CRO); W 21–12, 21–13	Navickas (LTU); W 20–22, 21–16, 21–13	Holst (DEN); W 21–12, 23–21	1st place, gold medalist(s)

Women

Athlete	Event	Group stage		Round of 16	Quarterfinal	Semifinal	Final / BM	
Athlete	Event	Opposition Score	Rank	Opposition Score	Opposition Score	Opposition Score	Opposition Score	Rank
Clara Azurmendi	Singles	Gonçalves (POR) W 21–16, 21–10; Kjaersfeldt (DEN) L 6–21, 12–21; Simić (SRB) W 21–11, 21–10	2 Q	Perminova (RUS); W 21–18, 21–14	Zechiri (BUL); W 19–21, 21–17, 21–17	Tan (BEL); L 21–16, 19–21, 13–21	—	3rd place, bronze medalist(s)
Laura Molina; Haideé Ojeda	Doubles	Bayrak/Yiğit (TUR) L 12–21, 12–21; Galenic/Poznanovic (CRO) W 21–14, 21–17; Krizkova/Tomalova (CZE) W 21–9, 21–10	2 Q	—	Bolotova/Kosetskaya (RUS); L 15–21, 11–21	Did not advance		

== Basketball ==
Spain has qualified both of the teams based on the performance at the 2014 FIBA Europe 3x3 Championships

=== Men's tournament ===
Team

- Sergio de la Fuente
- Álex Llorca
- Nacho Martín
- Juan Vasco

Group Play

Pos	Team	Pld	W	D	L	PF	PA	PD	Pts	Qualification
1	Russia	3	3	0	0	61	46	+15	6	Qualification to eighth finals
2	Spain	3	2	0	1	55	41	+14	4	Qualification to eighth finals
3	Belgium	3	1	0	2	46	61	−15	2	Qualification to eighth finals
4	Turkey	3	0	0	3	47	61	−14	0	Qualification to eighth finals

First match(es) will be played: 23 June 2015. Source: baku2015.com

23 Jun 2015
12:55

Game 1

Russia 21, Belgium 12

Basketball Arena, Baku

23 Jun 2015
14:35

Game 2

Turkey 9, Spain 19

Basketball Arena, Baku

23 Jun 2015
17:45

Game 3

Belgium 21, Turkey 20

Basketball Arena, Baku

24 Jun 2015
12:55

Game 4

Russia 19, Spain 16

Basketball Arena, Baku

24 Jun 2015
14:35

Game 5

Belgium 13, Spain 20

Basketball Arena, Baku

24 Jun 2015
17:45

Game 6

Russia 21, Turkey 18

Basketball Arena, Baku

Eighth Finals

25 Jun 2015
17:00

Game 1

Spain 22, Italy 20 (OT)

Basketball Arena, Baku

Quarterfinals

25 Jun 2015
19:00

Game 2

Azerbaijan 14, Spain 17

Basketball Arena, Baku

Semifinals

26 Jun 2015
15:00

Game 3

Serbia 16, Spain 19

Basketball Arena, Baku

Final

26 Jun 2015
18:00

Game 4

Russia 18, Spain 14

Basketball Arena, Baku

=== Women's tournament ===
Team

- Vega Gimeno
- Arantxa Novo
- Esther Montenegro
- Inmaculada Zanoguera

Group Play

Pos	Team	Pld	W	D	L	PF	PA	PD	Pts	Qualification
1	Spain	3	3	0	0	53	27	+26	6	Qualification to eighth finals
2	Slovenia	3	2	0	1	39	37	+2	4	Qualification to eighth finals
3	Ireland	3	1	0	2	41	47	−6	2	Qualification to eighth finals
4	Slovakia	3	0	0	3	27	49	−22	0	Qualification to eighth finals

First match(es) will be played: 23 June 2015. Source: baku2015.com

23 Jun 2015
13:20

Game 1

Slovakia 6, Spain 14

Basketball Arena, Baku

23 Jun 2015
16:30

Game 2

Ireland 10, Slovenia 14

Basketball Arena, Baku

23 Jun 2015
18:10

Game 3

Slovenia 15, Slovakia 9

Basketball Arena, Baku

24 Jun 2015
12:30

Game 4

Spain 18, Slovenia 10

Basketball Arena, Baku

24 Jun 2015
14:10

Game 5

Ireland 11, Spain 21

Basketball Arena, Baku

24 Jun 2015
16:30

Game 6

Slovakia 12, Ireland 20

Basketball Arena, Baku

Eighth Finals

25 Jun 2015
14:00

Game 1

Spain 11, Turkey 5

Basketball Arena, Baku

Quarterfinals

25 Jun 2015
18:30

Game 2

Spain 19, Azerbaijan 17

Basketball Arena, Baku

Semifinals

26 Jun 2015
14:30

Game 3

Spain 12, Russia 13

Basketball Arena, Baku

Bronze-medal match

26 Jun 2015
16:30

Game 4

Slovenia 9, Spain 19

Basketball Arena, Baku

== Beach soccer ==
Spain has qualified the men's team based on the performance at the 2014 Euro Beach Soccer League

- Nicolás Alvarado
- Salvador Ardil
- Ezequiel Carrera
- Francisco José Cintas
- Francisco Jesús Donaire
- Llorenç Gómez
- Juan Manuel Martín
- Antonio José Mayor
- Francisco Mejías
- Cristian Méndez
- Francisco Raúl Mérida
- Daniel Pajón

Group Play

Pos	Team	Pld	W	OTW	OTL	L	GF	GA	GD	Pts	Group stage result
1	Italy	3	2	0	1	0	12	9	+3	6	Advance to semifinals
2	Russia	3	2	0	0	1	14	12	+2	6	Advance to semifinals
3	Spain	3	1	1	0	1	9	8	+1	4	Advance to classification matches
4	Hungary	3	0	0	0	3	9	15	−6	0	Advance to classification matches

First match(es) will be played: 24 June 2015. Source: baku2015.com
24 June 2015
13:00

Spain	1–1 (3–1 pen.)	Italy

Beach Arena, Baku
24 June 2015
16:00

Hungary	3–5	Russia

Beach Arena, Baku

25 June 2015
13:00

Spain	5–2	Hungary

Beach Arena, Baku
25 June 2015
16:00

Russia	4–6	Italy

Beach Arena, Baku

26 June 2015
13:00

Italy	5–4	Hungary

Beach Arena, Baku
26 June 2015
16:00

Russia	5–3	Spain

Beach Arena, Baku

5th–8th Position Semifinals

27 June 2015
14:30

Spain	3–1	Azerbaijan

Beach Arena, Baku

5th–6th Position Match

28 June 2015
10:00

Ukraine	3–6	Spain

Beach Arena, Baku

== Boxing ==
Athlete	Event	Round of 32	Round of 16	Quarterfinals	Semifinals	Final	
Athlete	Event	Opposition Result	Opposition Result	Opposition Result	Opposition Result	Opposition Result	Rank
Kelvin de la Nieve	Men's 52 kg	BYE	Asenov (BUL); L 0–3	Did not advance			
Diego Ferrer	Men's 56 kg	Andreiana (ROU); L 0–3	Did not advance				
Johan Orozco	Men's 64 kg	Niculescu (ROU); L 0–2	Did not advance				
Youba Sissokho	Men's 69 kg	Pavlovs (LAT); W 3–0	Besputin (RUS); L 0–3	Did not advance			
Alejandro Camacho	Men's 81 kg	Strnisko (SVK); L 0–3	Did not advance				
Jennifer Miranda	Women's 60 kg	BYE	Mossely (FRA); L 0–3	Did not advance			

== Canoe sprint ==
Men

Athlete	Event	Heats		Semifinals		Finals	
Athlete	Event	Time	Rank	Time	Rank	Time	Rank
Alfonso Benavides	C1 200 m	39.399	2 QS	38.984	4 FB	40.833	10
André Oliveira	C1 1000 m	4:12.760	6 QS	3:48.150	6	Did not advance	
Manuel Antonio Campos; Diego Romero	C2 1000 m	3:43.370	5 QS	3:33.944	4	Did not advance	
Saúl Craviotto	K1 200 m	35.628	5 QS	35.235	4 FB	36.747	11
Roi Rodriguez	K1 1000 m	3:38.990	4 QS	3:25.969	5 FB	3:35.751	11
Roi Rodriguez	K1 5000 m	—				22:34.354	17
Carlos Arevalo; Cristian Toro	K2 200 m	32.319	4 QS	31.633	2 FA	32.518	4
Victor Rodríguez; Rubén Millán	K2 1000 m	3:22.359	6 QS	3:13.722	6	Did not advance	

Women

Athlete	Event	Heats		Semifinals		Finals	
Athlete	Event	Time	Rank	Time	Rank	Time	Rank
Isabel Contreras	K1 200 m	43.226	5 QS	41.140	6 FB	44.240	16
Begoña Lazkano	K1 500 m	1:57.949	6 QS	1:50.898	4 FB	2:12.441	16
Ana Varela	K1 5000 m	—				23:43.143	7
Isabel Contreras; Begoña Lazkano	K2 200 m	40.096	6 QS	38.704	6	Did not advance	
Isabel Contreras; Ana Varela	K2 500 m	1:42.433	4 QS	1:40.002	3 FA	1:56.036	8

== Cycling ==
Spain has qualified for the following events based on the UCI Nations Rankings

=== Road ===
Men

Athlete	Event	Time	Rank
Carlos Barbero	Men's road race	5:33:43	39
Jesús Herrada	Men's road race	5:27:25	4
Jesús Herrada	Men's time trial	1:02:27.67	9
Lluís Mas	Men's road race	DNF	
Luis León Sánchez	Men's road race	5:27:25	1st place, gold medalist(s)
Luis León Sánchez	Men's time trial	1:01:08.90	3rd place, bronze medalist(s)
Ángel Vicioso	Men's road race	DNF	
Sheyla Gutiérrez	Women's road race	3:34:09	42
Sheyla Gutiérrez	Women's time trial	36:14.28	22

=== Mountain biking ===
Athlete	Event	Time	Rank
Carlos Coloma Nicolás	Men's cross-country	1:44:08	7
José Antonio Hermida	Men's cross-country	DNF	
Sergio Mantecón Gutiérrez	Men's cross-country	1:43:59	6

=== BMX ===
Athlete	Event	Time Trial				Motos		Semifinals	Finals	Rank
Athlete	Event	Qualifying	Rank	Super Final	Rank	Points	Rank	Semifinals	Finals	Rank
Gustavo Alcojor Ramos	Men's BMX	35.128	22	Did not qualify		16	5	Did not advance		

== Diving ==
Athlete	Event	Qualification		Final	
Athlete	Event	Points	Rank	Points	Rank
Juan Pablo Socorro	3 metre springboard	399.85	23	Did not advance	
Juan Pablo Socorro	Platform	378.25	15	Did not advance	

== Fencing ==
Spain has qualified three quota places for the following events.

Athlete	Event	Group stage		Round of 32	Round of 16	Quarterfinal	Semifinal	Final / BM	
Athlete	Event	Opposition Score	Rank	Opposition Score	Opposition Score	Opposition Score	Opposition Score	Opposition Score	Rank
José Luis Abajo	Men's individual épée	Piasecki (NOR) W 5–3; Staub (SUI) L 2–5; Gusev (RUS) L 2–5; Zawrotniak (POL) L 4–5; Szenyi (HUN) W 4–3; Gustin (FRA) L 4–5	6 Q	Santarelli (ITA); W 15–11	Piasecki (NOR); L 12–15	Did not advance			
Fernando Casares	Men's individual sabre	Taghiyev (AZE) W 5–3; Dolniceanu (ROU) L 1–5; Ant (TUR) W 5–1; Honeybone (GBR) W 5–2	2 Q	Motorin (RUS); W 15–13	Van Holsbeke (BEL); W 15–14	Pellegrini (ITA); L 13–15	Did not advance		
Laia Vila	Women's individual sabre	Mikina (AZE) L 1–5; Kaleta (POL) W 5–1; Andreyeva (BLR) L 2–5; Ciaraglia (ITA) W 5–4; Sukhova (RUS) W 5–2	2 Q	BYE	Vougiouka (GRE); L 8–15	Did not advance			

== Gymnastics ==
=== Aerobic ===
Mixed

Athletes	Event	Qualification		Final	
Athletes	Event	Points	Rank	Points	Rank
Pedro Cabanas; Belen Guillemont; Vicente Lli; Aranzazu Martínez; Sara Moreno	Mixed Groups	20.683	2 Q	20.933	3rd place, bronze medalist(s)
Vicente Lli; Sara Moreno	Mixed Pairs	20.800	3 Q	21.150	1st place, gold medalist(s)

=== Artistic ===
Men
Team

Athlete	Event	Qualification							
Athlete	Event	Apparatus						Total	Rank
Athlete	Event	F	PH	R	V	PB	HB	Total	Rank
Néstor Abad	Team	13.733	13.566	13.533	14.800	15.066	14.500	85.198	11 Q
Fabián González	Team	14.600	14.500	13.233	14.533	13.133	14.566	84.565	13
Rayderley Zapata	Team	15.300 Q	—	13.333	14.033	12.100	—	NOC	
Total	Team	29.900	28.066	26.866	29.333	28.199	29.066	171.430	7

Individual

Athlete	Event	Final							
Athlete	Event	Apparatus						Total	Rank
Athlete	Event	F	PH	R	V	PB	HB	Total	Rank
Néstor Abad	All-around	14.366	13.900	13.166	14.900	15.000	14.266	85.598	6

Apparatus

Athlete	Event	Total	Rank
Rayderley Zapata	Floor	15.333	1st place, gold medalist(s)

Women
Team

Athlete	Event	Qualification					
Athlete	Event	Apparatus				Total	Rank
Athlete	Event	F	V	UB	BB	Total	Rank
Ainhoa Carmona	Team	12.233	13.900	12.366	12.833	51.332	29 Q
Claudia Colom	Team	11.466	13.866	11.200	11.800	48.332	45
Ana Pérez	Team	12.833	13.600	12.100	11.800	50.333	36
Total	Team	25.066	27.766	24.466	24.633	101.931	12

Individual

Athlete	Event	Final					
Athlete	Event	Apparatus				Total	Rank
Athlete	Event	F	V	UB	BB	Total	Rank
Ainhoa Carmena	All-around	12.233	14.000	12.633	13.100	51.966	10

=== Rhythmic ===
Individual

Athlete	Event	Final					
Athlete	Event	Ball	Clubs	Hoop	Ribbon	Total	Rank
Carolina Rodríguez	Individual	17.200	16.750	17.200	17.050	68.200	13

Team

Athlete	Event	Final			
Athlete	Event	5 ribbons	6 clubs 2 hoops	Total	Rank
Sandra Aguilar; Artemi Gavezou; Lourdes Mohedano; Elena López; Alejandra Quereda; Lidia Redondo	Team	17.350 Q	16.900	34.250	4

Apparatus Team

Athlete	Event	Final	
Athlete	Event	Total	Rank
Sandra Aguilar; Artemi Gavezou; Lourdes Mohedano; Elena López; Alejandra Quereda; Lidia Redondo	Ribbons	16.750	4

=== Trampoline ===
Women

Athlete	Event	Qualification		Final	
Athlete	Event	Points	Rank	Points	Rank
Claudia Prat	Individual	97.675	9	Did not advance	

== Judo ==
Men

Athlete	Event	Round of 64	Round of 32	Round of 16	Quarterfinals	Semifinals	Repechage	Final / BM	
Athlete	Event	Opposition Result	Opposition Result	Opposition Result	Opposition Result	Opposition Result	Opposition Result	Opposition Result	Rank
Francisco Garrigós	−60 kg	—	Rahima (ISR); W 111–000	Mushkiyev (AZE); W 001–000	Davtyan (ARM); W 001–000	Safarov (AZE); L 000–001	—	Papinashvili (GEO); L 000–100	5
David Ramírez Ramos	−66 kg	—	Larose (FRA); L 000–100	Did not advance					
Sugoi Uriarte	−66 kg	—	Avir (EST); W 100–000	Shershan (BLR); L 000–010	Did not advance				
Javier Ramírez	−73 kg	BYE	Steinbuks (LAT); W 101–000	Iartcev (RUS); L 000–002	Did not advance				
Kiyoshi Uematsu	−73 kg	BYE	Nicolaescu (ROU); W 100–000	Van Tichelt (BEL); L 000–001	Did not advance				
Adrián Nacimiento	−81 kg	Toniste (EST); W 101–001	Ntanatsidis (GRE); W 101–000	Dudchyk (UKR); L 000–010	Did not advance				
Nikoloz Sherazadishvili	−90 kg	BYE	Synyavsky (UKR); W 011–010	Liparteliani (GEO); L 001–100	Did not advance				
David Fernández	+100 kg	—	Sarnacki (POL); L 000–100	Did not advance					
David Fernández; Francisco Garrigós; Adrián Nacimiento; Javier Ramírez; Nikoloz Sherazadishvili	Men's Team	—		Czech Republic (CZE); L 1–4	Did not advance				

Women

Athlete	Event	Round of 32	Round of 16	Quarterfinals	Semifinals	Repechage	Final / BM	
Athlete	Event	Opposition Result	Opposition Result	Opposition Result	Opposition Result	Opposition Result	Opposition Result	Rank
Julia Figueroa	−48 kg	BYE	Budescu (MDA); W 100–000	Sahin (TUR); L 000–001	Did not advance	Moscatt (ITA); W 001–000	Dolgova (RUS); L 000–010	5
Laura Gómez	−52 kg	Biedermann (LIE); W 100–000	Kraeh (GER); L 000–001	Did not advance				
Concepción Bellorín	−57 kg	Verhagen (NED); L 000–110	Did not advance					
Jaione Equisoain	−57 kg	Ilieva (BUL); L 000–100	Did not advance					
Isabel Puche	−63 kg	Dakovic (CRO); L 000–001	Did not advance					
María Bernabéu	−70 kg	Eiglova (CZE); W 100–000	Gercsak (HUN); L 000–001	Did not advance				
Laia Talarn	−78 kg	BYE	Joó (HUN); L 000–100	Did not advance				
Marta Tort	−78 kg	BYE	Velensek (SLO); L 000–111	Did not advance				
María Mónica Berenciano	Blind −57 kg	—		Abdullayeva (AZE); L 000–100	Did not advance	Koseoglu (TUR); L 001–110	Did not advance	

== Karate ==
Spain has a total of seven athletes after the performance at the 2015 European Karate Championships.

Athlete	Event	Group phase				Semifinal	Final / BM	
Athlete	Event	Opposition Score	Opposition Score	Opposition Score	Rank	Opposition Score	Opposition Score	Rank
Matías Gómez	Men's −60 kg	Farzaliyev (AZE); L 0–2	Marqeshi (ALB); W 10–0	Maresca (ITA); L 1–2	3	Did not advance		
Manuel Rasero	Men's −67 kg	Da Costa (FRA); L 2–10	Tkebuchava (GEO); W 5–1	Aliyev (AZE); L 0–2	3	Did not advance		
Damián Quintero	Men's Kata	Rohde (DEN); W 5–0	Hirvonen (FIN); W 5–0	Busato (ITA); W 4–1	1 Q	Dack (FRA); W 5–0	Busato (ITA); W 5–0	1st place, gold medalist(s)
Cristina Ferrer	Women's −55 kg	Arandelovic (SRB); W 1–0	Alstadsaether (NOR); W 3–0	Thouy (FRA); D 0–0	2 Q	Kovacevic (CRO); L 1–2	Gasimova (AZE); L 2–5	4
Irene Colomar	Women's −61 kg	De Vos (BEL); L 0–1	Ristić (SLO); D 1–1	Ignace (FRA); L 0–3	4	Did not advance		
Cristina Vizcaíno	Women's −68 kg	Zaretska (AZE); L 1–6	Panetsidou (GRE); L 3–6	Buchinger (AUT); L 0–1	4	Did not advance		
Sandra Sánchez	Women's Kata	Dolphin (IRL); W 5–0	Scordo (FRA); W 4–1	Miskova (CZE); W 5–0	1 Q	Bleul (GER); W 5–0	Scordo (FRA); W 5–0	1st place, gold medalist(s)

== Sambo ==
Spain has been given two quota places at the Sambo events by the European Sambo Federation.

Athlete	Event	Round of 16	Quarterfinal	Semifinal	Repechage	Final / BM	
Athlete	Event	Opposition Score	Opposition Score	Opposition Score	Opposition Score	Opposition Score	Rank
Luis Menéndez Rubiera	Men's 74 kg	Sidakov (RUS); L 1–3	Did not advance				
Yaiza Jiménez López	Women's 60 kg	BYE	Stefanova (BUL); L 0–4	Did not advance	BYE	Hondiu (ROU); L 0–4	5

== Shooting ==
Men

Athlete	Event	Qualification		Semifinal		Final	
Athlete	Event	Points	Rank	Points	Rank	Points	Rank
Juan José Aramburu	Skeet	117	20	Did not advance			
Pablo Carrera	10 m air pistol	577	11	—		Did not advance	
Pablo Carrera	50 m pistol	549	17	—		Did not advance	
Jorge Díaz	10 m air rifle	620,9	25	—		Did not advance	
Alberto Fernández	Trap	119	11	Did not advance			
Jorge Llames	25 metre rapid fire pistol	583	4 Q	—		20	4
Javier López	10 m air rifle	615,6	33	—		Did not advance	
Javier López	50 m rifle prone	611,1	25	—		Did not advance	
Javier López	50 m rifle three positions	1140	24	—		Did not advance	
Javier Sánchez	10 m air pistol	570	28	—		Did not advance	
Javier Sánchez	50 m pistol	542	23	—		Did not advance	
Jesús Serrano	Trap	122	5 Q	11	6	Did not advance	

Women

Athlete	Event	Qualification		Semifinal		Final	
Athlete	Event	Points	Rank	Points	Rank	Points	Rank
Eva María Clemente	Trap	70	10	Did not advance			
Sonia Franquet	10 m air pistol	386	6 Q	—		196,3	2nd place, silver medalist(s)
Sonia Franquet	25 m pistol	579	6 Q	6	8	Did not advance	
Fátima Gálvez	Trap	73	1 Q	14	1 QG	13	1st place, gold medalist(s)
María Mercedes Soto	10 m air pistol	369	29	—		Did not advance	
María Mercedes Soto	25 m pistol	566	25	Did not advance			

Mixed

Athlete	Event	Qualification		Semifinal		Final	
Athlete	Event	Points	Rank	Points	Rank	Points	Rank
Pablo Carrera; Sonia Franquet	10 m air pistol	483	1 Q	239,1	2 QB	4	4
Alberto Fernández; Fátima Gálvez	Trap	88	5 Q	24	2 QB	27	4

== Swimming ==
Men

Athlete	Event	Heat		Semifinals		Final	
Athlete	Event	Time	Rank	Time	Rank	Time	Rank
Joan Casanovas	200 m freestyle	1:52.20	16	Did not advance			
Guillem Pujol	200 m freestyle	1:51.92	12 Q	1:51.74	10	Did not advance	
Ricardo Rosales	200 m freestyle	1:53.28	26	Did not advance			
Marc Vivas	200 m freestyle	1:50.93	6 Q	1:50.55	5 Q	1:51.03	6
Guillem Pujol	400 m freestyle	3:55.87	2	—		Did not advance	
Marcos Rodríguez	400 m freestyle	3:55.30	7	—		Did not advance	
Ricardo Rosales	400 m freestyle	3:55.22	6 Q	—		3:54.57	8
Marc Vivas	400 m freestyle	3:54.84	4 Q	—		3:53.92	4
Marcos Rodríguez	800 m freestyle	—				8:01.73	2nd place, silver medalist(s)
Ricardo Rosales	800 m freestyle	—				8:07.36	7
Marcos Rodríguez	1500 m freestyle	—				15:32.09	7
Javier Romero	50 m backstroke	26.26	6 Q	26.12	6 Q	26.20	6
Joan Casanovas	100 m backstroke	58.05	31	Did not advance			
Javier Romero	100 m backstroke	56.81	14 Q	57.01	16	Did not advance	
Pau Sola	50 m breaststroke	29.05	15 Q	29.03	14	Did not advance	
Pau Sola	100 m breaststroke	1:04.79	26	Did not advance			
Alberto Lozano	50 m butterfly	24.48	9 Q	24.18	6 Q	24.17	7
Javier Barrena	100 m butterfly	55.80	21	Did not advance			
Alberto Lozano	100 m butterfly	53.55	2 Q	53.23	2 Q	52.78	2nd place, silver medalist(s)
Javier Barrena	200 m butterfly	2:04.63	21	Did not advance			
Joan Casanovas	200 m individual medley	2:05.16	15 Q	2:03.84	9	Did not advance	
Joan Casanovas	400 m individual medley	4:32.15	26	—		Did not advance	
Joan Casanovas; Guillem Pujol; Marcos Rodríguez; Marc Vivas	4 × 200 m freestyle relay	7:26.18	3 Q	—		7:23.06	4
Javier Barrena; Guillem Pujol; Javier Romero; Pau Sola	4 × 100 m medley relay	3:46.65	6 Q	—		3:44.12	6

Women

Athlete	Event	Heat		Semifinals		Final	
Athlete	Event	Time	Rank	Time	Rank	Time	Rank
Marta Cano	50 m freestyle	26.76	17	Did not advance			
Marta Cano	100 m freestyle	57.35	15 Q	57.36	13	Did not advance	
Carmen San Nicolás	100 m freestyle	57.32	13 Q	56.89	8 Q	57.57	7
Marta Cano	200 m freestyle	2:03.85	9 Q	2:01.99	3 Q	2:02.15	6
Esther Huete	200 m freestyle	2:06.72	30	Did not advance			
Paula Ruiz	200 m freestyle	2:06.23	27	Did not advance			
Carmen San Nicolás	200 m freestyle	2:05.68	23 Q	2:04.88	13	Did not advance	
Marta Cano	400 m freestyle	4:24.12	18	—		Did not advance	
Marina Castro	400 m freestyle	4:21.29	11	—		Did not advance	
Esther Huete	400 m freestyle	4:20.38	9	—		Did not advance	
Paula Ruiz	400 m freestyle	4:19.50	7 Q	—		4:22.22	8
Marina Castro	800 m freestyle	—				8:45.51	3rd place, bronze medalist(s)
Esther Huete	800 m freestyle	—				8:56.75	11
Marina Castro	1500 m freestyle	—				16:46.16	3rd place, bronze medalist(s)
Paula Ruiz	1500 m freestyle	—				17:07.00	6
Paula García	50 m breaststroke	32.88	15 Q	33.00	15	Did not advance	
Paula García	100 m breaststroke	1:11.85	12 Q	1:11.58	7 Q	1:11.01	6
Carmen Balbuena	50 m butterfly	27.90	9 Q	27.59	8 Q	27.88	8
Carmen Balbuena	100 m butterfly	1:00.89	2 Q	1:00.36	3 Q	1:00.58	5
Andrea Melendo	100 m butterfly	1:02.70	16 Q	1:02.31	13	Did not advance	
Carmen Balbuena	200 m butterfly	2:13.70	6 Q	2:11.52	1 Q	2:12.43	4
Andrea Melendo	200 m butterfly	2:15.37	9 Q	2:15.75	9	Did not advance	
María Artigas	200 m individual medley	2:21.01	12	Did not advance			
Rosa María Maeso	200 m individual medley	2:20.56	11 Q	2:21.22	13	Did not advance	
Laia Martí	200 m individual medley	2:20.33	10 Q	2:20.92	11	Did not advance	
María Artigas	400 m individual medley	5:02.52	12	—		Did not advance	
Rosa María Maeso	400 m individual medley	5:00.87	11	—		Did not advance	
Laia Martí	400 m individual medley	4:56.50	9 Q	—		4:56.59	8
Marta Cano; Marina Castro; Paula Ruiz; Carmen San Nicolás	4 × 200 m freestyle relay	8:17.34	4 Q	—		8:17.56	6
Marta Cano; Paula García; Rosa María Maeso; Andrea Melendo	4 × 100 m medley relay	DSQ		—		Did not advance	

== Synchronised swimming ==
Spain has qualified for the following events

Athlete	Event	Qualification Free Routine		Final	
Athlete	Event	Points	Rank	Points	Rank
Berta Ferreras	Solo	162.6424	2	162.9758	2nd place, silver medalist(s)
Julia Echeberria; Irene Toledano	Duet	160.4379	4	160.8046	4
Julia Echeberria; Berta Ferreras; Helena Jauma; Carmen Juárez; Emilia Luboslavova; Raquel Estefanía Navarro; Itziar Sánchez; Irene Toledano; Sara Saldaña^{Res} Lidia Vigara^{Res}	Team	160.7072	2	162.0406	2nd place, silver medalist(s)
Julia Echeberria; Berta Ferreras; Helena Jauma; Carmen Juárez; Emilia Luboslavova; Raquel Estefanía Navarro; Itziar Sánchez; Sara Saldaña; Irene Toledano; Lidia Vigara	Free Combination	86.9667	2	87.7333	2nd place, silver medalist(s)

== Table Tennis ==
Spain has qualified the following quota places:

Men

Athlete	Event	Round of 64	Round of 32	Round of 16	Quarterfinal	Semifinal	Final / BM	
Athlete	Event	Opposition Score	Opposition Score	Opposition Score	Opposition Score	Opposition Score	Opposition Score	Rank
Marc Durán	Singles	Groth (DEN); W 4–2	Apolonia (POR); L 2–4	Did not advance				
Carlos Machado	Singles	Stoyanov (ITA); L 2–4	Did not advance					
Marc Durán; Carlos Machado; Álvaro Robles	Team	—			Germany (GER); L 0–3	Did not advance		

Women

Athlete	Event	Round of 64	Round of 32	Round of 16	Quarterfinal	Semifinal	Final / BM	
Athlete	Event	Opposition Score	Opposition Score	Opposition Score	Opposition Score	Opposition Score	Opposition Score	Rank
Galia Dvorak	Singles	Imanova (AZE); W 4–0	Vacenovska (CZE); W 4–3	Solja (GER); L 0–4	Did not advance			
Yanfei Shen	Singles	BYE	Strbikova (CZE); L 2–4	Did not advance				

== Taekwondo ==
Athlete	Event	Round of 16	Quarterfinals	Semifinals	Repechage	Final / BM	
Athlete	Event	Opposition Result	Opposition Result	Opposition Result	Opposition Result	Opposition Result	Rank
Jesús Tortosa	Men's 58 kg	Kokshyntsau (BLR); W 12–0	Mammadov (AZE); W 8–3	Tuncat (GER); W 17–5	BYE	Bragança (POR); L 5–6	2nd place, silver medalist(s)
Joel González	Men's 68 kg	Dalakliev (BUL); W 2–1	Taghizade (AZE); L 5–7	Did not advance	Pantar (SLO); W 11–3	Arventii (MDA); W 7–6	3rd place, bronze medalist(s)
Raúl Martínez	Men's 80 kg	Ferreira (POR); L 4–10	Did not advance				
Daniel Ros	Men's +80 kg	Larin (RUS); L 2–16	Did not advance		Roseanu (ROU); W 9–4	Trajkovič (SLO); W 15–3	3rd place, bronze medalist(s)
Brigitte Yagüe	Women's 49 kg	Nicoli (ITA); L 2–3	Did not advance				
Eva Calvo	Women's 57 kg	Demneri (ALB); W 13–1	Yangin (TUR); W 11–3	Zaninović (CRO); L 5–6	BYE	Kotsis (HUN); W 15–2	3rd place, bronze medalist(s)
Lua Piñeiro	Women's 67 kg	Klaey (SUI); W 7–5	Niaré (FRA); L 4–8	Did not advance			
Rosanna Simón	Women's +67 kg	Kowalczuk (POL); W 5–4	Mandić (SRB); L 3–12	Did not advance	Popović (MNE); W 6–1	Rados (CRO); L 4–12	5

== Triathlon ==
Spain has qualified for the following events

Athlete	Event	Swim (1.5 km)	Trans 1	Bike (40 km)	Trans 2	Run (10 km)	Total Time	Rank
Fernando Alarza	Men's	19:26	0:46	57:43	0:27	32:07	1:50:29	11
David Castro	Men's	19:28	0:44	57:28	0:27	34:31	1:52:38	24
Francesc Godoy	Men's	18:45	0:46	58:21	0:24	33:07	1:51:23	17
Miriam Casillas	Women's	22:03	0:48	1:05:03	0:27	36:28	2:04:49	13
Tamara Gómez	Women's	21:55	0:48	1:05:11	0:26	35:07	2:03:27	5

== Volleyball ==
Spain has qualified for the following events

=== Beach volleyball ===
Athlete	Event	Preliminary round	Standing	Elimination round	Round of 16	Quarterfinals	Semifinals	Final / BM	
Athlete	Event	Opposition Score	Standing	Opposition Score	Opposition Score	Opposition Score	Opposition Score	Opposition Score	Rank
Christian García; Francisco Marco	Men's	Pool G Kollo/Vesik (EST); L 1 – 2 (18–21, 21–15, 17–19); Gregory/Sheaf (GBR); W 2 – 0 ( 23–21, 21–14); Petutschnig/Winter (AUT); L 1 – 2 (18–21, 18–21)	3 Q	Kubala/Hadrava (CZE); L 1 – 2 (21–16, 15–21, 13–15)	Did not advance				
César Menéndez; Francisco Tómas	Men's	Pool B Strasser/Kissling (SUI); W 2 – 0 (21–12, 21–16); Denin/Plotnytskyi (UKR); L 1 – 2 (21–18, 16–21, 14–16); Kosiak/Rudol (POL); L 1 – 2 (21–18, 15–21, 13–15)	4	Did not advance					
Amaranta Fernández; Esther Rivera	Women's	Pool E Lehtonen/Lahti (FIN); L 0 – 2 (15–21, 9–21); Gioria/Momoli (ITA); W 0 – 2 (15–21, 9–21); Shalayeuskaya/Siakretava (BLR); W 2 – 0 (21–12, 21–19)	3 Q	Babenka/Mileuskaya (BLR); W 2 – 1 (18–21, 21–16, 15–13)	Rehackova/Galova (CZE); L 1 – 2 (21–16, 20–22, 13–15)	Did not advance			
Ángela Lobato; Paula Soria	Women's	Pool C Babenka/Mileuskaya (BLR); W 2 – 0 (21–19, 21–15); Kongshavn/Kjoelberg (NOR); W 2 – 0 (21–13, 21–14)	1 Q	BYE	Zolnercikova/Jakubsova (CZE); W 2 – 1 (21–16, 20–22, 15–11)	Eiholzer/Betschart (SUI); L 0 – 2 (14–21, 13–21)	Did not advance		

== Water Polo ==
Spain has qualified both of the teams based on the performance at the 2013 European Junior Water Polo Championships

=== Men's tournament ===
- Oriol Albacete
- Jordi Chico
- Alex De la Fuente
- Josu Fernández
- Álvaro García
- Pablo Gómez de la Puente
- Álvaro Granados
- Guillermo Palomar
- Nikolas Paúl
- Josep Puig
- Oriol Rodríguez
- Marc Salvador
- Francisco Valera

Group play

Pos	Team	Pld	W	D	L	GF	GA	GD	Pts	
1	Spain	3	3	0	0	46	22	+24	9	Qualification to quarterfinals
2	Serbia	3	2	0	1	41	18	+23	6	Qualification to play-offs
3	Slovakia	3	1	0	2	29	36	−7	3	Qualification to play-offs
4	Malta	3	0	0	3	15	55	−40	0	

First match(es) will be played: 13 June 2015. Source: baku2015.com

13 Jun 2015; 09:30	Game 1	Spain	22–4	Malta	Water Polo Arena, Baku

13 Jun 2015; 11:15	Game 2	Serbia	14–5	Slovakia	Water Polo Arena, Baku

14 Jun 2015; 13:00	Game 3	Serbia	9–10	Spain	Water Polo Arena, Baku

14 Jun 2015; 16:45	Game 4	Malta	8–15	Slovakia	Water Polo Arena, Baku

15 Jun 2015; 09:30	Game 5	Serbia	18–3	Malta	Water Polo Arena, Baku

15 Jun 2015; 11:15	Game 6	Spain	14–9	Slovakia	Water Polo Arena, Baku

Quarterfinals

17 Jun 2015; 14:15	Game 1	Spain	14–9	Russia	Water Polo Arena, Baku

Semifinals

19 Jun 2015; 16:00	Game 2	Spain	9–8	Croatia	Water Polo Arena, Baku

Final

21 Jun 2015; 16:30	Game 3	Spain	7–8	Serbia	Water Polo Arena, Baku

=== Women's tournament ===
- Alejandra Aznar
- Carmen Baringo
- Alba Bonamusa
- Paula Crespí
- Helena Dalmases
- Sandra Domene
- Laura Gómez
- Blanca Goset
- Mireia Guiral
- Paula Leiton
- Elia Montoya
- Anna Roldán
- Paula Rutgers

Group play

Pos	Team	Pld	W	D	L	GF	GA	GD	Pts	
1	Russia	5	4	1	0	89	29	+60	13	Qualification to semifinals
2	Spain	5	4	0	1	75	33	+42	12	Qualification to play-offs
3	Italy	5	3	1	1	76	37	+39	10	Qualification to play-offs
4	Slovakia	5	2	0	3	33	64	−31	6	
5	France	5	1	0	4	27	83	−56	3	
6	Serbia	5	0	0	5	26	80	−54	0	

First match(es) will be played: 12 June 2015. Source: baku2015.com

12 Jun 2015; 13:45	Game 1	Spain	17–4	Serbia	Water Polo Arena, Baku

12 Jun 2015; 15:30	Game 2	Russia	13–4	Slovakia	Water Polo Arena, Baku

12 Jun 2015; 15:30	Game 3	Italy	22–5	France	Water Polo Arena, Baku

13 Jun 2015; 11:15	Game 4	France	3–25	Russia	Water Polo Arena, Baku

13 Jun 2015; 13:00	Game 5	Serbia	8–9	Slovakia	Water Polo Arena, Baku

13 Jun 2015; 18:45	Game 6	Spain	10–8	Italy	Water Polo Arena, Baku

14 Jun 2015; 13:00	Game 7	Russia	12–8	Spain	Water Polo Arena, Baku

14 Jun 2015; 15:00	Game 8	Italy	17–4	Serbia	Water Polo Arena, Baku

14 Jun 2015; 18:45	Game 9	Slovakia	9–5	France	Water Polo Arena, Baku

15 Jun 2015; 11:15	Game 10	Spain	20–4	Slovakia	Water Polo Arena, Baku

15 Jun 2015; 13:00	Game 11	Serbia	7–9	France	Water Polo Arena, Baku

15 Jun 2015; 18:45	Game 12	Italy	11–11	Russia	Water Polo Arena, Baku

16 Jun 2015; 14:15	Game 13	Russia	28–3	Serbia	Water Polo Arena, Baku

16 Jun 2015; 16:00	Game 14	Italy	18–7	Slovakia	Water Polo Arena, Baku

16 Jun 2015; 19:45	Game 15	Spain	20–5	France	Water Polo Arena, Baku

Play-offs

17 Jun 2015; 12:15	Game 1	Hungary	5–8	Spain	Water Polo Arena, Baku

Semifinals

18 Jun 2015; 17:00	Game 2	Spain	9–6	Greece	Water Polo Arena, Baku

Final

20 Jun 2015; 16:30	Game 3	Russia	10 (7)–10 (6)	Spain	Water Polo Arena, Baku

== Wrestling ==
Spain has qualified for the following events

Men's Greco-Roman

Athlete	Event	Qualification	Round of 16	Quarterfinal	Semifinal	Repechage 1	Repechage 2	Final / BM	
Athlete	Event	Opposition Result	Opposition Result	Opposition Result	Opposition Result	Opposition Result	Opposition Result	Opposition Result	Rank
Ismael Navarro	66 kg	Arutyunyan (ARM); L 0–3	BYE			Stas (BUL); W 3–1	Maksimović (SRB); L 0–3	Did not advance	
Ricardo Gil	75 kg	Dietsche (SUI); L 0–5	Did not advance						

Men's freestyle

Athlete	Event	Qualification	Round of 16	Quarterfinal	Semifinal	Repechage 1	Repechage 2	Final / BM	
Athlete	Event	Opposition Result	Opposition Result	Opposition Result	Opposition Result	Opposition Result	Opposition Result	Opposition Result	Rank
Levan Metreveli	57 kg	BYE	Andreyeu (BLR); L 1–4	Did not advance					
Yunier Castillo	65 kg	BYE	Martikainen (FIN); W 3–1	Bucur (ROU); L 0–4	Did not advance				
Alberto Martínez	74 kg	Khadjiev (FRA); L 1–4	Did not advance						
Taimuraz Friev	86 kg	Dolly (IRL); W 4–0	Murtazaliev (ARM); L 1–3	Did not advance					
José Cuba	125 kg	Gagloev (SVK); L 0–4	Did not advance						

Women's freestyle

Athlete	Event	Round of 16	Quarterfinal	Semifinal	Repechage 1	Repechage 2	Final / BM	
Athlete	Event	Opposition Result	Opposition Result	Opposition Result	Opposition Result	Opposition Result	Opposition Result	Rank
Eugenia Bustabad	48 kg	Yankova (BUL); L 0–4	Did not advance		BYE	Schellin (GER); L 1–3	Did not advance	
Karima Sánchez	55 kg	Gun (TUR); L 1–3	Did not advance					
Maider Unda	75 kg	BYE	Nemeth (HUN); W 3–1	Marzaliuk (BLR); L 1–3	BYE		Selmaier (GER); W 3–1	3rd place, bronze medalist(s)
