= Shooting at the 2015 European Games – Men's 50 metre pistol =

Men's 50 m pistol at the 2015 European Games
- Venue: Baku Shooting Centre
- Date: 20 June
- Competitors: 31 from 22 nations

Medalists
gold medal	Damir Mikec	Serbia
silver medal	Pavol Kopp	Slovakia
bronze medal	Abdullah Ömer Alimoğlu	Turkey

The men's 50 metre pistol competition at the 2015 European Games in Baku, Azerbaijan was held on 16 June at the Baku Shooting Centre.

== Schedule ==
All times are local (UTC+5).

Date	Time	Event
Tuesday, 16 June 2015	09:00	Qualification
Tuesday, 16 June 2015	11:15	Final

== Results ==
=== Qualification ===
Rank	Athlete	Series						Total	Xs	Notes
Rank	Athlete	1	2	3	4	5	6	Total	Xs	Notes
1	Damir Mikec (SRB)	94	95	95	93	95	95	567	9	GR
2	Oleh Omelchuk (UKR)	95	92	97	95	94	94	567	9	GR
3	Yusuf Dikeç (TUR)	98	93	93	93	93	94	564	10	
4	Florian Schmidt (GER)	91	96	95	90	96	92	560	11	
5	Abdullah Ömer Alimoğlu (TUR)	95	96	91	94	88	95	559	6	
6	Pavol Kopp (SVK)	94	92	94	96	94	87	557	7	
7	Ásgeir Sigurgeirsson (ISL)	94	91	93	89	98	91	556	9	
8	Juraj Tužinský (SVK)	89	95	91	94	96	89	554	13	
9	Anton Gourianov (RUS)	94	89	93	93	91	94	554	11	
10	Vladimir Isakov (RUS)	92	96	90	94	89	93	554	6	
11	Yauheni Zaichyk (BLR)	91	91	91	94	95	91	553	7	
12	Giuseppe Giordano (ITA)	93	94	93	89	92	92	553	6	
13	Samuil Donkov (BUL)	97	93	87	92	89	94	552	11	
14	João Costa (POR)	91	89	90	96	90	94	550	10	
15	Mathieu Perie (FRA)	90	95	90	91	94	90	550	9	
16	Jindřich Dubový (CZE)	92	90	90	93	92	93	550	6	
17	Pablo Carrera (ESP)	94	86	94	93	94	88	549	9	
18	Wojciech Knapik (POL)	89	96	93	90	89	89	546	2	
19	Pavlo Korostylov (UKR)	91	89	92	95	90	87	544	7	
20	Kamil Gersten (POL)	88	92	91	90	91	91	543	7	
21	Željko Posavec (CRO)	94	94	87	91	88	89	543	6	
22	Lauris Strautmanis (LAT)	87	90	87	89	96	93	542	7	
23	Javier Sánchez (ESP)	92	89	94	89	90	88	542	6	
24	Rasul Mammadov (AZE)	92	90	88	90	88	92	540	5	
25	Dario Di Martino (ITA)	91	89	86	88	94	91	539	11	
26	Arben Kucana (ALB)	91	92	88	90	91	86	538	4	
27	Kanstantsin Lukashyk (BLR)	91	89	92	87	90	88	537	7	
28	Noryar Arakelyan (ARM)	89	91	89	89	90	87	535	5	
29	Andrija Zlatić (SRB)	90	84	90	87	88	83	522	3	
30	Antoine Adamus (FRA)	81	89	87	85	88	85	515	2	
31	Čedomir Knežević (MNE)	88	75	78	76	91	86	494	6	

=== Final ===
Rank	Athlete	Series									Notes
Rank	Athlete	1	2	3	4	5	6	7	8	9	Notes
1st place, gold medalist(s)	Damir Mikec (SRB)	27.1	56.0	75.5	94.4	114.9	133.3	153.1	172.5	192.2	GR
2nd place, silver medalist(s)	Pavol Kopp (SVK)	27.2	52.0	70.6	91.3	110.7	131.0	149.4	167.9	187.5	
3rd place, bronze medalist(s)	Abdullah Ömer Alimoglu (TUR)	27.1	55.1	72.5	90.8	109.2	129.6	148.6	167.1		
4	Oleh Omelchuk (UKR)	29.8	58.7	77.1	95.1	113.4	130.8	147.9			
5	Ásgeir Sigurgeirsson (ISL)	26.3	54.2	73.9	91.8	110.2	127.1				
6	Florian Schmidt (GER)	25.0	52.2	70.8	88.2	106.5					
7	Yusuf Dikeç (TUR)	28.3	55.9	70.6	86.9						
8	Juraj Tužinský (SVK)	27.3	50.4	69.0							
