= Shooting at the 2015 European Games – Men's 10 metre air pistol =

Men's 10 m air pistol at the 2015 European Games
- Venue: Baku Shooting Centre
- Date: 17 June
- Competitors: 35 from 23 nations

Medalists
gold medal	Damir Mikec	Serbia
silver medal	João Costa	Portugal
bronze medal	Juraj Tužinský	Slovakia

The men's 10 metre air pistol competition at the 2015 European Games in Baku, Azerbaijan was held on 17 June at the Baku Shooting Centre.

== Schedule ==
All times are local (UTC+5).

Date	Time	Event
Tuesday, 17 June 2015	09:00	Qualification
Tuesday, 17 June 2015	11:15	Final

== Results ==
=== Qualification ===
Rank	Athlete	Series						Total	Xs
Rank	Athlete	1	2	3	4	5	6	Total	Xs
1	Oleh Omelchuk (UKR)	98	97	96	99	96	97	583	24
2	Juraj Tužinský (SVK)	95	98	97	98	97	97	582	15
3	João Costa (POR)	97	96	98	97	99	95	582	15
4	Luca Tesconi (ITA)	97	97	97	98	98	94	581	22
5	İsmail Keleş (TUR)	98	94	97	99	98	95	581	20
6	Pavlo Korostylov (UKR)	97	97	98	96	96	97	581	14
7	Piotr Daniluk (POL)	95	95	97	98	96	99	580	24
8	Damir Mikec (SRB)	96	95	98	98	95	97	579	22
9	Yusuf Dikeç (TUR)	97	95	96	95	95	100	578	20
10	Pavol Kopp (SVK)	94	95	97	97	98	97	578	20
11	Pablo Carrera (ESP)	94	97	93	97	99	97	577	21
12	Sergey Chervyakovskiy (RUS)	98	96	96	95	97	95	577	16
13	Dino Briganti (ITA)	98	95	94	94	98	97	576	20
14	Tsotne Machavariani (GEO)	94	94	97	97	99	95	576	15
15	Vladimir Gontcharov (RUS)	97	96	95	96	96	96	576	14
16	Dimitrije Grgic (SRB)	95	96	97	94	97	97	576	12
17	Mathieu Perie (FRA)	96	95	96	94	98	96	575	18
18	Jindrich Dubovy (CZE)	96	91	99	94	96	98	574	17
19	Ruslan Lunev (AZE)	95	97	96	94	95	97	574	15
20	Vitali Kudzi (BLR)	99	95	93	95	95	97	574	13
21	Yauheni Zaichyk (BLR)	100	98	96	95	91	93	573	17
22	Ásgeir Sigurgeirsson (ISL)	96	95	96	97	94	94	572	22
23	Wojciech Knapik (POL)	95	97	91	95	96	97	571	20
24	Konstantinos Malgarinos (GRE)	96	94	91	96	97	97	571	15
25	Samuil Donkov (BUL)	98	94	91	92	97	98	570	20
26	Peeter Olesk (EST)	97	93	99	95	91	95	570	15
27	Lauris Strautmanis (LAT)	97	90	95	94	97	97	570	14
28	Javier Sánchez (ESP)	94	94	93	96	97	96	570	11
29	Arben Kucana (ALB)	96	89	99	94	95	96	569	16
30	Zeljko Posavec (CRO)	95	94	94	97	91	96	567	17
31	Antoine Adamus (FRA)	95	94	95	94	93	93	564	14
32	Rasul Mammadov (AZE)	82	92	97	95	95	98	559	16
33	Čedomir Knežević (MNE)	95	90	93	89	94	91	552	10

=== Final ===
Rank	Athlete	Series									Notes
Rank	Athlete	1	2	3	4	5	6	7	8	9	Notes
1st place, gold medalist(s)	Damir Mikec (SRB)	29.8	58.5	78.7	97.6	118.9	139.3	160.6	181.0	201.8	GR
2nd place, silver medalist(s)	João Costa (POR)	29.8	60.6	80.6	99.2	118.9	139.4	161.1	181.1	201.5	
3rd place, bronze medalist(s)	Juraj Tužinský (SVK)	31.5	61.4	82.3	102.2	123.5	143.5	162.3	180.1		
4	İsmail Keleş (TUR)	30.4	60.7	80.9	100.9	121.4	139.2	157.8			
5	Pavlo Korostylov (UKR)	28.0	57.4	77.7	99.0	119.6	138.2				
6	Oleh Omelchuk (UKR)	29.4	60.5	78.9	97.7	117.0					
7	Piotr Daniluk (POL)	28.6	57.5	77.2	95.9						
8	Luca Tesconi (ITA)	28.0	59.2	76.7							
