= Shooting at the 2015 European Games – Women's 10 metre air pistol =

Women's 10 m air pistol at the 2015 European Games
- Venue: Baku Shooting Centre
- Date: 17 June
- Competitors: 36 from 24 nations

Medalists
gold medal	Zorana Arunović	Serbia
silver medal	Sonia Franquet	Spain
bronze medal	Viktoria Chaika	Belarus

The Women's 10 metre air pistol competition at the 2015 European Games in Baku, Azerbaijan was held on 17 June at the Baku Shooting Centre.

== Schedule ==
All times are local (UTC+5).

Date	Time	Event
Wednesday, 17 June 2015	09:15	Qualification
Wednesday, 17 June 2015	11:00	Final

== Results ==
=== Qualification ===
Rank	Athlete	Series				Total	Xs	Notes
Rank	Athlete	1	2	3	4	Total	Xs	Notes
1	Olga Kuznetsova (RUS)	97	98	98	97	390	13	GR
2	Viktoria Chaika (BLR)	97	97	98	96	388	12	
3	Ekaterina Korshunova (RUS)	98	96	95	99	388	8	
4	Zorana Arunović (SRB)	98	95	97	98	388	8	
5	Olena Kostevych (UKR)	99	96	97	94	386	15	
6	Sonia Franquet (ESP)	98	96	97	95	386	13	
7	Heidi Diethelm Gerber (SUI)	97	98	96	95	386	9	
8	Sylvia Steiner (AUT)	95	96	96	98	385	12	
9	Stefanie Thurmann (GER)	93	95	97	98	383	12	
10	Klaudia Breś (POL)	97	95	96	95	383	11	
11	Monika Karsch (GER)	94	95	98	95	382	9	
12	Maria Grozdeva (BUL)	94	95	96	95	380	10	
13	Céline Goberville (FRA)	96	96	95	93	380	8	
14	Bobana Veličković (SRB)	94	92	99	94	379	14	
15	Lizi Kiladze (GEO)	94	88	99	98	379	12	
16	Nino Salukvadze (GEO)	94	95	96	94	379	10	
17	Adrienn Nemes (HUN)	91	97	96	95	379	9	
18	Tereza Přibáňová (CZE)	95	94	95	95	379	9	
19	Anna Korakaki (GRE)	95	93	96	94	378	11	
20	Vlatka Pervan (CRO)	94	96	94	93	377	9	
21	Polina Konarieva (UKR)	92	94	92	98	376	10	
22	Giustina Chiaberto (ITA)	97	92	93	93	375	10	
23	Antoaneta Boneva (BUL)	92	93	97	93	375	8	
24	Stéphanie Tirode (FRA)	97	94	93	91	375	8	
25	Joana Castelão (POR)	94	96	93	92	375	5	
26	Irada Ashumova (AZE)	91	94	93	95	373	5	
27	Zsófia Csonka (HUN)	92	92	91	97	372	10	
28	Marija Marović (CRO)	95	94	89	92	370	8	
29	María Mercedes Soto (ESP)	91	93	94	91	369	6	
30	Manon Hamblenne (BEL)	87	95	93	91	366	5	
31	Agate Rašmane (LAT)	87	95	92	91	365	4	
32	Eleanor Bezzina (MLT)	90	91	94	90	365	3	
33	Petra Dobravec (SLO)	95	89	89	90	363	6	
34	Vera Rumiantseva (EST)	91	89	88	92	360	7	
35	Narmina Samadova (AZE)	91	86	93	90	360	2	
36	Lumturie Rama (KOS)	92	83	83	93	351	3	

=== Final ===
Rank	Athlete	Series									Notes
Rank	Athlete	1	2	3	4	5	6	7	8	9	Notes
1st place, gold medalist(s)	Zorana Arunović (SRB)	30.7	60.5	80.7	100.2	119.0	138.6	159.2	179.9	199.5	GR
2nd place, silver medalist(s)	Sonia Franquet (ESP)	29.7	58.9	78.4	98.1	118.5	138.8	159.7	177.5	196.3	
3rd place, bronze medalist(s)	Viktoria Chaika (BLR)	30.1	58.1	77.4	98.6	119.5	139.1	158.7	177.4		
4	Olena Kostevych (UKR)	29.6	58.9	79.1	98.5	118.8	137.9	157.9			
5	Ekaterina Korshunova (RUS)	31.8	61.4	81.4	99.4	117.3	137.7				
6	Olga Kuznetsova (RUS)	30.0	59.5	78.7	98.1	116.9					
7	Heidi Diethelm Gerber (SUI)	29.9	59.3	77.6	97.7						
8	Sylvia Steiner (AUT)	28.1	58.1	76.7							
