= Karate at the 2015 European Games – Women's kumite 55 kg =

Karate competition

Women's kumite 55 kg at the 2015 European Games
- Venue: Baku Crystal Hall
- Date: 13 June
- Competitors: 8 from 8 nations

Medalists
gold medal	Emily Thouy	France
silver medal	Jelena Kovačević	Croatia
bronze medal	Ilaha Gasimova	Azerbaijan

The Women's kumite 55 kg competition at the 2015 European Games in Baku, Azerbaijan was held on 13 June 2015 at the Crystal Hall.

== Schedule ==
All times are Azerbaijan Time (UTC+4).

Date	Time	Event
Saturday, 13 June 2015	10:00	Elimination Round
Saturday, 13 June 2015	15:30	Semifinals
Saturday, 13 June 2015	17:00	Finals

== Results ==
Legend

- KK — Forfeit (Kiken)

=== Elimination round ===
==== Group A ====
Athlete	Pld	W	D	L	Points		
Athlete	Pld	W	D	L	GF	GA	Diff
Emilie Thouy (FRA)	3	2	1	0	10	0	+10
Cristina Ferrer (ESP)	3	2	1	0	4	0	+4
Branka Aranđelović (SRB)	3	1	0	2	4	4	0
Bettina Alstadsæther (NOR)	3	0	0	3	0	14	-14

	Score	
Emilie Thouy (FRA)	7–0	Bettina Alstadsæther (NOR)
Cristina Ferrer (ESP)	1–0	Branka Aranđelović (SRB)
Emilie Thouy (FRA)	3–0	Branka Aranđelović (SRB)
Cristina Ferrer (ESP)	3–0	Bettina Alstadsæther (NOR)
Bettina Alstadsæther (NOR)	0–4	Branka Aranđelović (SRB)
Emilie Thouy (FRA)	0–0	Cristina Ferrer (ESP)

==== Group B ====
Athlete	Pld	W	D	L	Points		
Athlete	Pld	W	D	L	GF	GA	Diff
Jelena Kovačević (CRO)	3	1	2	0	2	1	+1
Ilaha Qasimova (AZE)	3	2	0	1	5	1	+4
Tuba Yakan (TUR)	3	1	1	1	5	1	+4
Jennifer Warling (LUX)	3	0	1	2	1	10	-9

	Score	
Tuba Yakan (TUR)	0–0	Jelena Kovačević (CRO)
Jennifer Warling (LUX)	0–4	Ilaha Qasimova (AZE)
Tuba Yakan (TUR)	0–1	Ilaha Qasimova (AZE)
Jennifer Warling (LUX)	1–1	Jelena Kovačević (CRO)
Jelena Kovačević (CRO)	1–0	Ilaha Qasimova (AZE)
Tuba Yakan (TUR)	5–0	Jennifer Warling (LUX)

== Finals ==
Semifinals
Emilie Thouy (FRA)	6
Ilaha Qasimova (AZE)	1
Cristina Ferrer (ESP)	1
Jelena Kovačević (CRO)	2

Gold medal match
(France) Emily Thouy (FRA)	2
Jelena Kovačević (CRO)	1
Bronze medal match
Ilaha Qasimova (AZE)	5
Cristina Ferrer (ESP)	2
