= Table tennis at the 2015 European Games – Women's singles =

Women's singles at the 2015 European Games
- Venue: Baku Crystal Hall
- Date: 16–19 June
- Competitors: 47 from 28 nations

Medalists
gold medal	Li Jiao	Netherlands
silver medal	Li Jie	Netherlands
bronze medal	Melek Hu	Turkey

The women's singles in table tennis at the 2015 European Games in Baku was the 1st edition of the event in a European Games It was at the Baku Crystal Hall from 16 to 19 June 2015.

== Seeds ==
Seeds were based on the ITTF World Ranking lists published in June 2015.

1. Han Ying (GER)
2. Liu Jia (AUT)
3. Elizabeta Samara (ROU)
4. Georgina Póta (HUN)
5. Li Jie (NED)
6. Yu Fu (POR)
7. Petrissa Solja (GER)
8. Melek Hu (TUR)
9. Shen Yanfei (ESP)
10. Li Jiao (NED)
11. Li Qian (POL)
12. Tetyana Bilenko (UKR)
13. Li Xue (FRA)
14. Margaryta Pesotska (UKR)
15. Sofia Polcanova (AUT)
16. Iveta Vacenovská (CZE)

== Schedule ==
All times are Azerbaijan Summer Time (UTC+5)

Date	Time	Event
Tuesday, 16 June 2015	11:30	First Round
Thursday, 17 June 2015	11:00	Second Round
Friday, 18 June 2015	11:00	Third Round
Friday, 18 June 2015	11:00	Quarterfinals
Saturday, 19 June 2015	14:00	Semifinals
Saturday, 19 June 2015	17:00	Final

== Draw ==
=== Finals ===
Semifinals
5	Li Jie (NED)	11	11	12	11
Eva Ódorová (SVK)	4	5	10	7
8	Melek Hu (TUR)	7	13	8	10	11	9
10	Li Jiao (NED)	11	11	11	12	8	11

Gold medal match
5	Li Jie (NED)	11	5	10	5
10	Li Jiao (NED)	13	11	12	11
Bronze medal match
Eva Ódorová (SVK)	10	10	8	13	7
8	Melek Hu (TUR)	12	12	11	11	11

=== Top half ===
==== Section 1 ====
First Round
K Grzybowska (POL)	11	8	11	8	11	8
G Feher (SRB)	6	11	13	11	9	11
R Paškauskienė (LTU)	6	9	11	11	11	11
K Sibley (GBR)	11	11	5	3	5	8
B Szőcs (ROU)	11	11	11	11
R Guliyeva (AZE)	5	9	6	5

Second Round
1	Y Han (GER)	11	11	11	12
P Mikhailova (RUS)	9	4	8	10
15	S Polcanova (AUT)	11	11	11	11
G Feher (SRB)	3	9	7	4
13	X Li (FRA)	11	16	11	6	11
R Paškauskienė (LTU)	9	14	3	11	6
5	J Li (NED)	11	11	11	11
B Szőcs (ROU)	3	7	4	2

Third Round
1	Y Han (GER)	12	11	11	11
15	S Polcanova (AUT)	10	2	3	9
13	X Li (FRA)	7	11	11	7	8	10
5	J Li (NED)	11	5	8	11	11	12

Quarterfinals
1	Y Han (GER)	11	11	6	7	9	11	8
5	J Li (NED)	8	7	11	11	11	9	11

==== Section 2 ====
First Round
E Ódorová (SVK)	12	11	11	15	11	11
L Bergström (SWE)	10	13	6	17	8	8
R Štrbíková (CZE)	11	11	11	11
L Kourea (CYP)	6	1	6	5
Y Tian (CRO)	11	11	11	11
A Arlouskaya (BLR)	5	5	6	2
X Ni (LUX)	11	11	11	11
L Lung (BEL)	8	4	1	6

Second Round
6	F Yu (POR)	10	11	9	8	8
E Ódorová (SVK)	12	8	11	11	11
9	Y Shen (ESP)	12	12	11	10	18	14
R Štrbíková (CZE)	14	10	6	12	20	16
14	M Pesotska (UKR)	11	11	11	6	11
Y Tian (CRO)	8	6	4	11	7
4	G Póta (HUN)	8	6	9	5
X Ni (LUX)	11	11	11	11

Third Round
E Ódorová (SVK)	16	7	13	11	8	11
R Štrbíková (CZE)	14	1	11	9	11	9
14	M Pesotska (UKR)	8	11	11	14	9	11
X Ni (LUX)	11	5	5	12	11	3

Quarterfinals
E Ódorová (SVK)	11	11	11	10	11
14	M Pesotska (UKR)	5	9	4	12	9

=== Bottom half ===
==== Section 3 ====
First Round
M Ekholm (SWE)	11	11	11	11
A Karova (BUL)	0	5	2	1
L Rakovac (CRO)	11	11	11	10	11
A Privalova (BLR)	2	7	8	12	3
B Balážová (SVK)	11	11	11	8	11
A Galič (SLO)	7	7	9	11	8
C Grundisch (FRA)	10	11	6	11	11	8	11
S de Nutte (LUX)	12	9	11	6	5	11	7

Second Round
3	E Samara (ROU)	7	9	11	11	11	11
M Ekholm (SWE)	11	11	7	9	9	8
11	Q Li (POL)	13	11	11	11
L Rakovac (CRO)	11	8	4	7
12	T Bilenko (UKR)	3	11	11	8	11	9	11
B Balážová (SVK)	11	7	8	11	6	11	7
8	M Hu (TUR)	11	12	12	5	11
C Grundisch (FRA)	8	10	10	11	9

Third Round
3	E Samara (ROU)	11	11	9	11	9	17	9
11	Q Li (POL)	7	2	11	7	11	19	11
12	T Bilenko (UKR)	7	5	6	11	6
8	M Hu (TUR)	11	11	11	6	11

Quarterfinals
11	Q Li (POL)	9	3	7	11	11	11	9
8	M Hu (TUR)	11	11	11	9	4	3	11

==== Section 4 ====
First Round
A Erdelji (SRB)	11	11	11	12
L Giardi (SMR)	3	4	4	10
G Dvorak (ESP)	11	11	11	11
M Imanova (AZE)	5	9	10	4
Y Noskova (RUS)	11	11	11	7	13
R Moret (SUI)	5	5	7	11	11
D Madarasz (HUN)	11	11	11	8	9	6	11
L Oliveira (POR)	6	5	4	11	11	11	7

Second Round
7	P Solja (GER)	11	11	6	11	5	11
A Erdelji (SRB)	6	6	11	4	11	3
16	I Vacenovská (CZE)	11	5	11	9	11	8	9
G Dvorak (ESP)	6	11	3	11	7	11	11
10	J Li (NED)	11	11	11	12	10	10	11
Y Noskova (RUS)	7	13	7	10	12	12	9
2	J Liu (AUT)	7	11	11	11	11
D Madarasz (HUN)	11	6	9	3	5

Third Round
7	P Solja (GER)	11	11	13	11
G Dvorak (ESP)	3	8	11	4
10	J Li (NED)	12	11	11	11
2	J Liu (AUT)	10	6	7	8

Quarterfinals
7	P Solja (GER)	9	9	11	11	7	5
10	J Li (NED)	11	11	8	8	11	11
