= Taekwondo at the 2015 European Games – Men's +80 kg =

Taekwondo competition

Men's +80 kg at the 2015 European Games
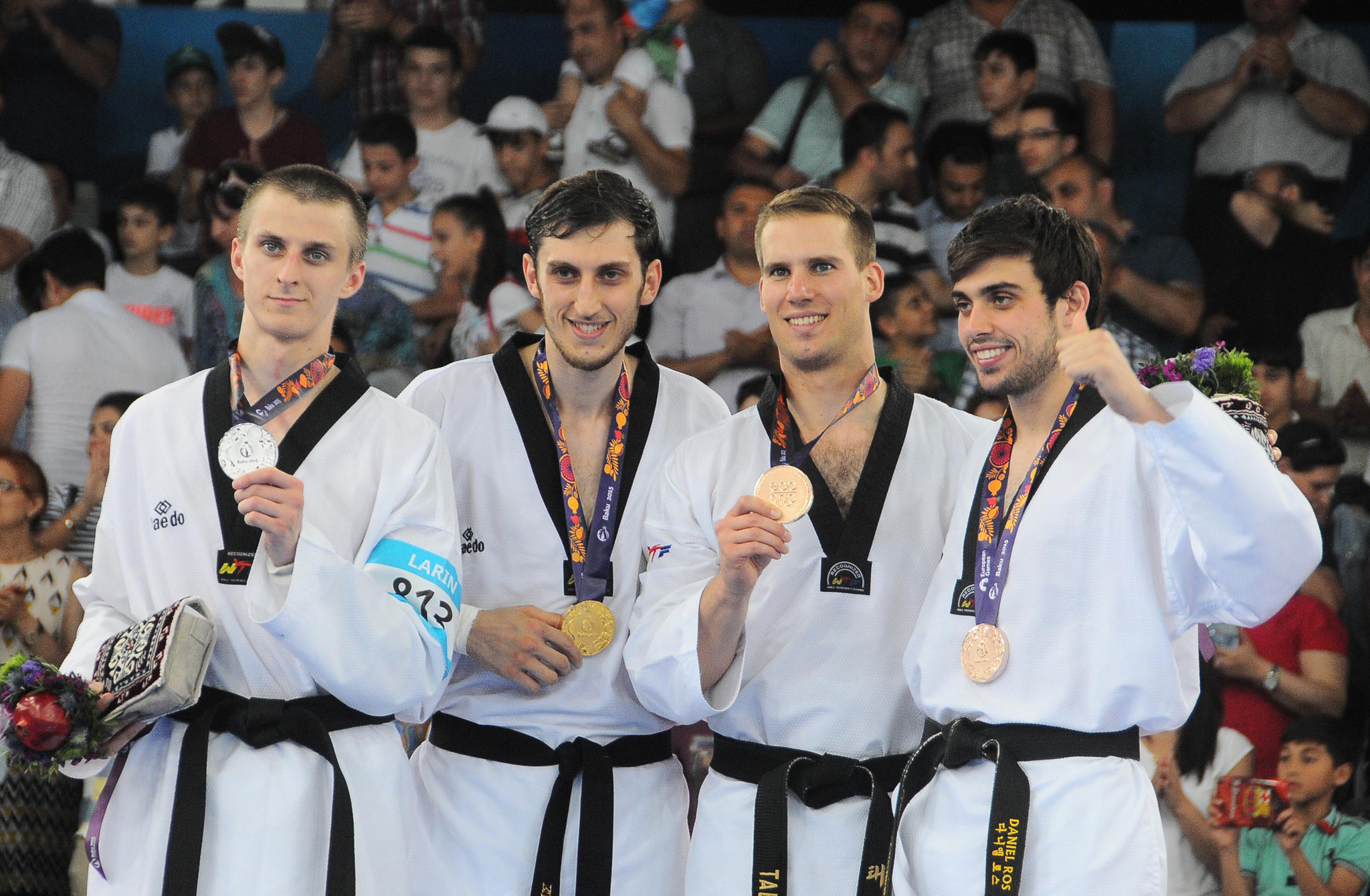
- The medal ceremony.
- Venue: Crystal Hall complex
- Date: 19 June
- Competitors: 15 from 15 nations

Medalists
gold medal	Radik Isayev	Azerbaijan
silver medal	Vladislav Larin	Russia
bronze medal	Vedran Golec	Croatia
bronze medal	Daniel Ros	Spain

Men's +80 kg competition at the Taekwondo at the 2015 European Games in Baku, Azerbaijan, took place on 15 June at Crystal Hall complex.

== Schedule ==
All times are Azerbaijan Summer Time (UTC+5).

Date	Time	Event
Tuesday, 19 June 2015	11:00	1/8 finals
Tuesday, 19 June 2015	13:00	Quarterfinals
Tuesday, 19 June 2015	13:00	Semifinals
Tuesday, 19 June 2015	15:00	Repechage
Tuesday, 19 June 2015	19:00	Finals

== Results ==
1/8 finals
Jeroen Wanrooij (NED)	10
Ali Sarı (TUR)	9
Ivan Trajkovič (SLO)	14
Piotr Hatowski (POL)	8
Demetris Moustakas (CYP)	1
Leonardo Basile (ITA)	10
Mahama Cho (GBR)	5
Konstantinos Gkoltsios (GRE)	10
Omar El Yazidi (FRA)	7
Vedran Golec (CRO)	10
Vladislav Larin (RUS)	16
Daniel Ros (ESP)	2
Claudiu Roșeanu (ROU)	7
Volker Wodzich (GER)	6

Quarterfinals
Radik Isayev (AZE)	8
Jeroen Wanrooij (NED)	6
Ivan Trajkovič (SLO)	10
Leonardo Basile (ITA)	9
Konstantinos Gkoltsios (GRE)	11
Vedran Golec (CRO)	15
Vladislav Larin (RUS)	20
Claudiu Roșeanu (ROU)	1

Semifinals
Radik Isayev (AZE)	17
Ivan Trajkovič (SLO)	2
Vedran Golec (CRO)	0
Vladislav Larin (RUS)	8

Final
Radik Isayev (AZE)	4
Vladislav Larin (RUS)	3

=== Repechage ===
Repechage round 1
Daniel Ros (ESP)	9
Claudiu Roseanu (ROU)	4

Bronze medal match
Vedran Golec (CRO)	7
Jeroen Wanrooij (NED)	5
Daniel Ros (ESP)	15
Ivan Trajkovič (SLO)	3
