= Shooting at the 2015 European Games – Women's 25 metre pistol =

Women's 25 m pistol at the 2015 European Games
- Venue: Baku Shooting Centre
- Date: 19–20 June
- Competitors: 28

Medalists
| gold medal | Heidi Diethelm Gerber | Switzerland |
| silver medal | Antoaneta Boneva | Bulgaria |
| bronze medal | Monika Karsch | Germany |

The Women's 25 metre pistol competition at the 2015 European Games in Baku, Azerbaijan was held on 19 and 20 June at the Baku Shooting Centre.

== Schedule ==
All times are local (UTC+5).

| Date | Time | Event |
|---|---|---|
| Friday, 19 June 2015 | 09:00 | Qualification |
| Saturday, 20 June 2015 | 10:00 | Qualification |
| Saturday, 20 June 2015 | 13:00 | Semifinal |
| Saturday, 20 June 2015 | 13:15 | Final |

== Results ==
=== Qualification ===
| Rank | Athlete | Precision | | | Rapid | | | Total | Xs | Notes |
| Rank | Athlete | 1 | 2 | 3 | 1 | 2 | 3 | Total | Xs | Notes |
|---|---|---|---|---|---|---|---|---|---|---|
| 1 | Sylvia Steiner (AUT) | 98 | 99 | 98 | 96 | 97 | 97 | 585 | 20 | GR |
| 2 | Antoaneta Boneva (BUL) | 98 | 98 | 97 | 99 | 97 | 96 | 585 | 17 | GR |
| 3 | Yuliya Alipava (RUS) | 95 | 96 | 96 | 98 | 98 | 100 | 583 | 22 | |
| 4 | Olena Kostevych (UKR) | 99 | 96 | 97 | 99 | 96 | 96 | 583 | 17 | |
| 5 | Monika Karsch (GER) | 94 | 98 | 92 | 99 | 97 | 99 | 579 | 24 | |
| 6 | Sonia Franquet (ESP) | 96 | 96 | 98 | 96 | 99 | 94 | 579 | 12 | |
| 7 | Heidi Diethelm Gerber (SUI) | 94 | 97 | 95 | 98 | 97 | 97 | 578 | 18 | |
| 8 | Munkhbayar Dorjsuren (GER) | 96 | 94 | 97 | 96 | 96 | 99 | 578 | 15 | |
| 9 | Céline Goberville (FRA) | 97 | 98 | 97 | 95 | 97 | 94 | 578 | 13 | |
| 10 | Anna Korakaki (GRE) | 96 | 98 | 96 | 96 | 98 | 93 | 577 | 21 | |
| 11 | Petra Trdličková (CZE) | 96 | 96 | 93 | 98 | 95 | 99 | 577 | 14 | |
| 12 | Maria Grozdeva (BUL) | 89 | 98 | 98 | 97 | 96 | 98 | 576 | 24 | |
| 13 | Renáta Tobai-Sike (HUN) | 96 | 94 | 94 | 98 | 97 | 97 | 576 | 19 | |
| 14 | Anna Mastyanina (RUS) | 94 | 94 | 97 | 97 | 98 | 96 | 576 | 15 | |
| 15 | Irada Ashumova (AZE) | 97 | 94 | 95 | 98 | 98 | 94 | 576 | 15 | |
| 16 | Agate Rašmane (LAT) | 97 | 95 | 97 | 96 | 93 | 97 | 575 | 18 | |
| 17 | Jasna Šekarić (SRB) | 97 | 97 | 96 | 95 | 96 | 94 | 575 | 18 | |
| 18 | Zorana Arunović (SRB) | 95 | 97 | 95 | 95 | 94 | 99 | 575 | 17 | |
| 19 | Viktoria Chaika (BLR) | 99 | 97 | 94 | 87 | 97 | 100 | 574 | 20 | |
| 20 | Nino Salukvadze (GEO) | 98 | 98 | 93 | 93 | 96 | 95 | 573 | 17 | |
| 21 | Stéphanie Tirode (FRA) | 95 | 97 | 97 | 94 | 94 | 96 | 573 | 5 | |
| 22 | Vlatka Pervan (CRO) | 97 | 97 | 95 | 92 | 96 | 94 | 571 | 13 | |
| 23 | Zsófia Csonka (HUN) | 89 | 93 | 96 | 93 | 99 | 97 | 567 | 18 | |
| 24 | Tereza Přibáňová (CZE) | 91 | 95 | 94 | 97 | 94 | 96 | 567 | 11 | |
| 25 | María Mercedes Soto (ESP) | 91 | 90 | 96 | 94 | 98 | 97 | 566 | 9 | |
| 26 | Klaudia Breś (POL) | 95 | 97 | 96 | 88 | 96 | 93 | 565 | 16 | |
| 27 | Joana Castelão (POR) | 98 | 93 | 88 | 89 | 97 | 96 | 561 | 11 | |
| 28 | Vera Rumiantseva (EST) | 97 | 90 | 97 | 90 | 92 | 94 | 560 | 10 | |
| — | Manon Hamblenne (BEL) | | | | | | | DNS | | |

=== Semifinal ===
| Rank | Athlete | Series | | | | | Hits | Notes |
| Rank | Athlete | 1 | 2 | 3 | 4 | 5 | Hits | Notes |
|---|---|---|---|---|---|---|---|---|
| 1 | Heidi Diethelm Gerber (SUI) | 1 | 4 | 4 | 3 | 5 | 17 | |
| 2 | Antoaneta Boneva (BUL) | 5 | 3 | 2 | 4 | 3 | 17 | |
| 3 | Yuliya Alipava (RUS) | 1 | 3 | 3 | 3 | 4 | 14 | |
| 3 | Monika Karsch (GER) | 2 | 5 | 3 | 2 | 1 | 13 | |
| 5 | Munkhbayar Dorjsuren (GER) | 1 | 1 | 4 | 2 | 3 | 11 | |
| 6 | Olena Kostevych (UKR) | 2 | 2 | 3 | 1 | 3 | 11 | |
| 7 | Sylvia Steiner (AUT) | 1 | 1 | 3 | 2 | 3 | 10 | |
| 8 | Sonia Franquet (ESP) | 1 | 2 | 2 | 1 | 0 | 6 | |

=== Finals ===
==== Bronze medal match ====
| Rank | Athlete | Series | | | | | | Points | Notes |
| Rank | Athlete | 1 | 2 | 3 | 4 | 5 | 6 | Points | Notes |
|---|---|---|---|---|---|---|---|---|---|
| 3rd place, bronze medalist(s) | Monika Karsch (GER) | 2 | 2 | 0 | 0 | 2 | 2 | 8 | |
| 4 | Yuliya Alipava (RUS) | 0 | 0 | 2 | 2 | 0 | 0 | 4 | |

==== Gold medal match ====
| Rank | Athlete | Series | | | | | | Points | Notes |
| Rank | Athlete | 1 | 2 | 3 | 4 | 5 | 6 | Points | Notes |
|---|---|---|---|---|---|---|---|---|---|
| 1st place, gold medalist(s) | Heidi Diethelm Gerber (SUI) | 0 | 2 | 2 | 0 | 2 | 1 | 7 | |
| 2nd place, silver medalist(s) | Antoaneta Boneva (BUL) | 2 | 0 | 0 | 2 | 0 | 1 | 5 | |
