= Juraj Tužinský =

Slovak sport shooter (born 1984)

Personal information
- Nickname: Tužo
- Nationality: Slovak
- Born: 24 August 1984 (age 41) Lučenec, Czechoslovakia
- Height: 1.84 m (6 ft 0 in)
- Weight: 78 kg (172 lb)

Sport
- Country: Slovakia
- Sport: Shooting
- Events: 10 m air pistol (AP60); 50 m pistol (FP)
- Club: Dukla Banská Bystrica
- Coached by: Miroslav Marko
Medal record
Men's shooting
Representing Slovakia
ISSF World Cup
Bronze medal – third place	2016 Rio de Janeiro	10 m air pistol
Bronze medal – third place	2015 Gabala	10 m air pistol
European Championships
Gold medal – first place	2021 Osijek	10 m air pistol
Gold medal – first place	2025 Osijek	10 m air pistol
Silver medal – second place	2024 Győr	10 m air pistol
Bronze medal – third place	2010 Meråker	10 m air pistol
European Games
Bronze medal – third place	2015 Baku	10 m air pistol

Juraj Tužinský (born 24 August 1984) is a Slovak sport shooter who competes in the men's 10 metre air pistol. At the 2012 Summer Olympics, he finished 15th in the qualifying round, failing to make the cut for the final.
