= Emily Thouy =

French karateka (born 1993)

Personal information
- Born: 26 January 1993 (age 33)

Sport
- Country: France
- Sport: Karate
- Weight class: 55 kg
- Events: Kumite; Team kumite
Medal record
Women's karate
Representing France
World Championships
Gold medal – first place	2012 Paris	Team kumite
Gold medal – first place	2016 Linz	Kumite 55 kg
Silver medal – second place	2014 Bremen	Kumite 55 kg
European Championships
Gold medal – first place	2015 Istanbul	Kumite 55 kg
Silver medal – second place	2013 Budapest	Team kumite
Bronze medal – third place	2014 Tampere	Kumite 55 kg
European Games
Gold medal – first place	2015 Baku	Kumite 55 kg

Emily Thouy (born 26 January 1993) is a French karateka. She became world champion in the women's kumite 55 kg event at the 2016 World Karate Championships held in Linz, Austria.

== Career ==
Thouy won the gold medal in the women's team kumite event at the 2012 World Karate Championships held in Paris, France. Two years later, at the 2014 World Karate Championships held in Bremen, Germany, she won the silver medal in the women's kumite 55 kg event.

In 2015, Thouy won the gold medal in the women's kumite 55 kg event at the European Games held in Baku, Azerbaijan. In the final, she defeated Jelena Kovačević of Croatia. She won the gold medal in her event at the 2016 World University Karate Championships held in Braga, Portugal.

In 2017, Thouy competed in the women's kumite 55 kg event at the World Games held in Wrocław, Poland. She lost her bronze medal match against Sara Cardin of Italy.

== Achievements ==
Year	Competition	Venue	Rank	Event
2012	World Championships	Paris, France	1st	Team kumite
2013	European Championships	Budapest, Hungary	2nd	Team kumite
2014	European Championships	Tampere, Finland	3rd	Kumite 55 kg
2014	World Championships	Bremen, Germany	2nd	Kumite 55 kg
2015	European Championships	Istanbul, Turkey	1st	Kumite 55 kg
2015	European Games	Baku, Azerbaijan	1st	Kumite 55 kg
2016	World Championships	Linz, Austria	1st	Kumite 55 kg
