= Bobana Veličković =

Serbian sport shooter (1990–2020)

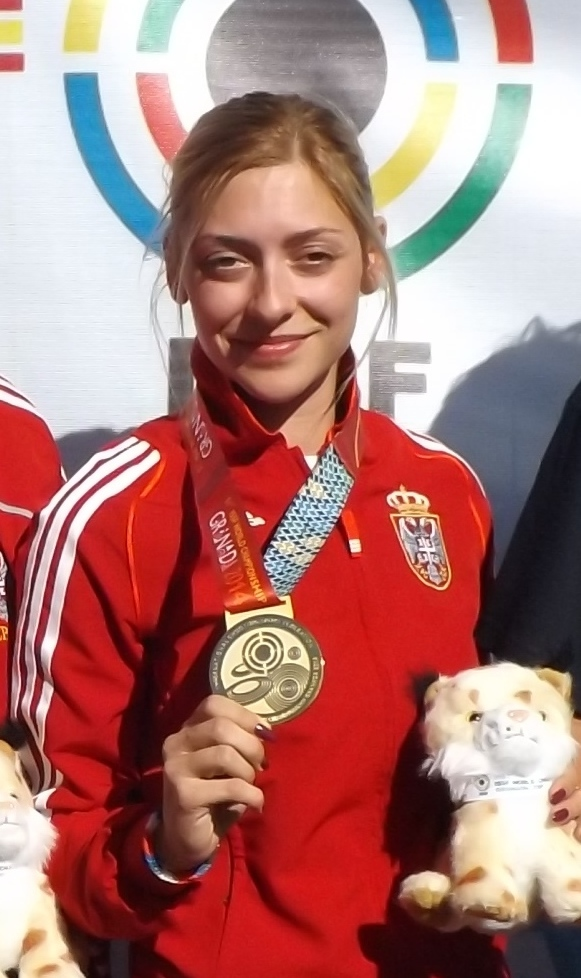

Personal information
- Born: 25 January 1990 Bor, SR Serbia, SFR Yugoslavia
- Died: 21 June 2020 (aged 30) Belgrade, Serbia

Sport
- Sport: Sports shooting
Medal record
Women's shooting
Representing Serbia
World Championships
Gold medal – first place	2014 Granada	10m air pistol team
European Championships
Gold medal – first place	2010 Meråker	10m air pistol
Gold medal – first place	2010 Meråker	10m air pistol team
Gold medal – first place	2011 Brescia	10m air pistol team
Gold medal – first place	2012 Vierumäki	10m air pistol
Gold medal – first place	2013 Odense	10m air pistol team
Gold medal – first place	2017 Maribor	10m air pistol team
Gold medal – first place	2020 Wrocław	10m air pistol
Gold medal – first place	2020 Wrocław	10m air pistol team
Silver medal – second place	2014 Moscow	10m air pistol mixed team
Silver medal – second place	2016 Győr	10m air pistol team
Bronze medal – third place	2012 Vierumäki	10m air pistol team
Bronze medal – third place	2018 Győr	10m air pistol
Bronze medal – third place	2018 Győr	10m air pistol team

Bobana Veličković (Serbian Cyrillic: Бобана Величковић; 25 January 1990 – 21 June 2020) was a Serbian sport shooter. A two-time Olympian, she competed in the women's 10 metre air pistol at the 2012 Summer Olympics in London and the 2016 Summer Olympics in Rio de Janeiro, recording her best finish of 7th in 2016. She also took part in a second event, the women's 25 metre pistol, in Rio, where she recorded 21st position. Victorious in 2010, 2012 and 2020, she was a three-time European Champion in 10m air pistol.

== Career ==
Veličković was born in the city of Bor on 25 January 1990. She won her first international medal in 2007. She took part in the 2010 European 10 m Events Championships in Meråker, Norway, winning gold in the women's pistol event. Veličković repeated the achievement two years later at the 2012 European 10 m Events Championships in Vierumäki, Finland.

Veličković took part in the London 2012 Summer Olympics, where she finished 22nd overall in the women's 10 metre pistol event. At the 2016 Summer Olympics in Rio de Janeiro, she finished seventh overall in the women's 10 metre pistol event. She also competed in the qualifying round for the women's 25 metre pistol, where she finished 21st overall and did not advance to the final stages.

Veličković won the gold medal in the pistol event at the 2020 European 10 m Events Championships held in the Polish city of Wroclaw in February 2020. It was her last individual gold medal.

== Death ==
On 21 June 2020, Veličković died due to complications at childbirth including pre-eclampsia. Her death occurred around 20 days after the birth of her son.

Veličković was posthumously announced as the Sportswoman of the Year in Serbia for 2020, in recognition of her European title at the start of the year.
