= Arben Kucana =

Albanian sport shooter (born 1967)

Personal information
- Nickname: Ben Kucana
- Nationality: Albania
- Citizenship: Albania Germany
- Born: 18 September 1967 (age 58) Tirana, Albania
- Education: Academy of Arts in Tirana
- Height: 1.84 m (6 ft 0 in)
- Weight: 95 kg (209 lb)
- Website: www.kucana.com

Sport
- Sport: Shooting
- Event(s): FP, AP60
- Club: HSG Munich 1406

Arben Kucana (born 18 September 1967) is a German-Albanian sport shooter who competes in the olympic pistol disciplines. At the 2012 Summer Olympics, he finished 20th in the 10m air pistol qualifying round. He has lived in Germany since 1990 and actively participates in national shooting competitions in both Germany and Albania.
