= Water polo at the 2015 European Games – Men's tournament =

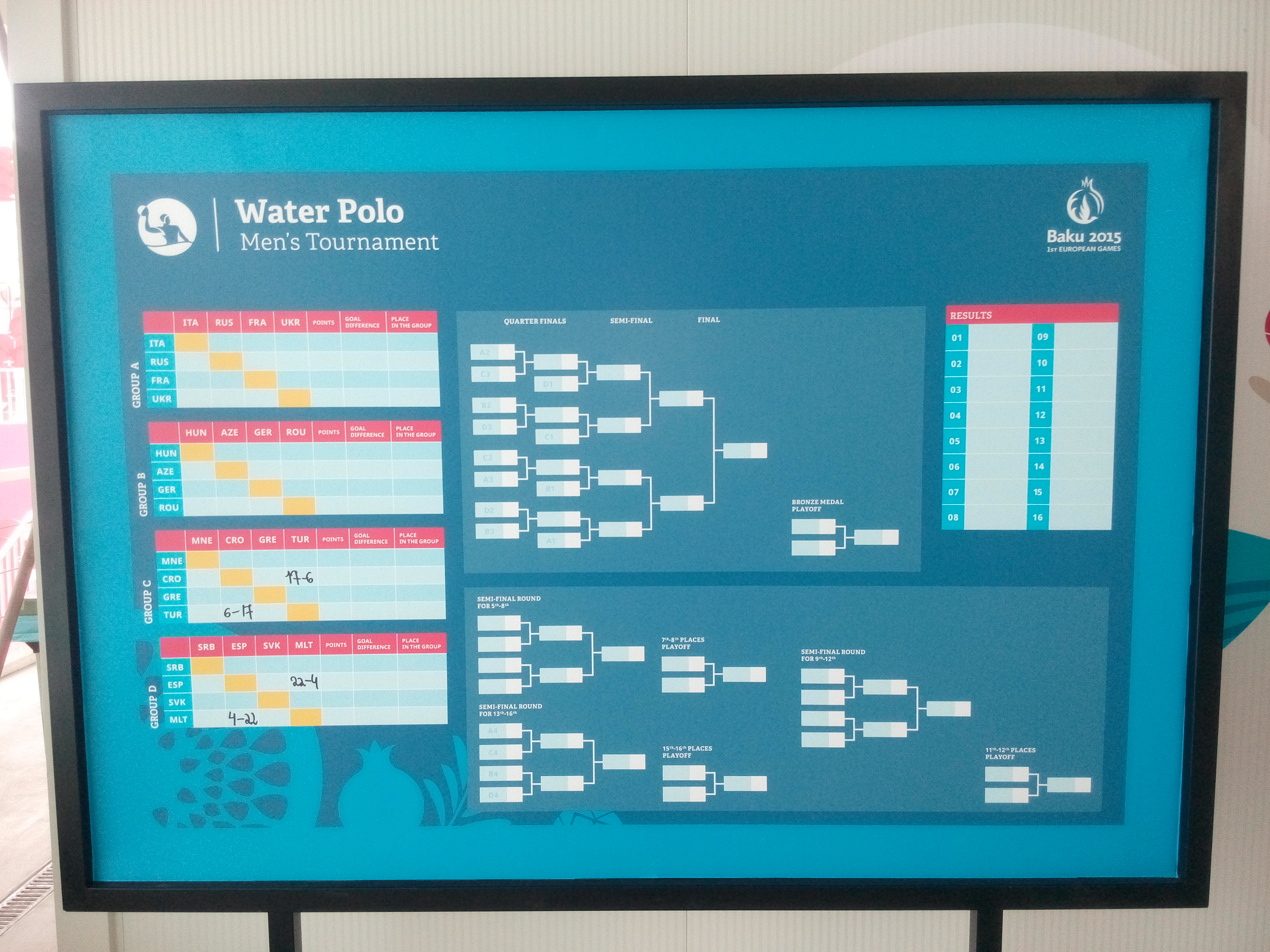
- Men's tournament

Tournament details
- Venue: 1 (in 1 host city)
- Dates: 13–21 June
- Teams: 16 (from 1 confederation)

Final positions
- Champions: Serbia (1st title)
- Runners-up: Spain
- Third place: Greece
- Fourth place: Croatia

Tournament statistics
- Matches played: 48
- Top scorers: (Germany) Denis Strelezkij (25 goals)

Awards
- Best goalkeeper: (Greece) Adamantios Mantis

The men's water polo tournament at the 2015 European Games was held in Baku, Azerbaijan from 13 to 21 June 2015.

== Qualification ==
Means of qualification	Date	Venue	Number of berths	Nation(s) qualified
Host nation	–	–	1	Azerbaijan
2013 European Junior Water Polo Championships	8–15 September 2013	(Malta) Gżira	7	Montenegro; Serbia; Italy; Hungary; Croatia; Russia; Spain
2015 European Games Qualification Tournament A	12–15 March 2015	(Netherlands) Nijverdal	2	Greece; Ukraine
2015 European Games Qualification Tournament B	12–15 March 2015	(Austria) Graz	2	Slovakia; Turkey
2015 European Games Qualification Tournament C	12–15 March 2015	(Poland) Szczecin	2	France; Romania
2015 European Games Qualification Tournament D	12–15 March 2015	(Malta) Gżira	2	Germany; Malta
Total			16	

== Preliminary round ==
All times are local (UTC+5).

=== Group A ===
Pos	Team	Pld	W	D	L	GF	GA	GD	Pts	Qualification
1	Italy	3	3	0	0	39	19	+20	9	Quarterfinals
2	Russia	3	2	0	1	42	22	+20	6	Playoffs
3	France	3	1	0	2	23	29	−6	3	Playoffs
4	Ukraine	3	0	0	3	16	50	−34	0	13–16th place semifinals

Source: Baku 2015

13 June 2015; 15:00	Report	Russia	20–7	Ukraine	Water Polo Arena, Baku; Referees: Miodrag Stefanović (SRB); Matan Schwartz (ISR)
13 June 2015; 15:00	Report	Score by quarters: 5–0, 2–2, 6–3, 7–2			Water Polo Arena, Baku; Referees: Miodrag Stefanović (SRB); Matan Schwartz (ISR)
13 June 2015; 15:00	Report	Krug 5	Goals	Dzyadyk, Leshchenko 2	Water Polo Arena, Baku; Referees: Miodrag Stefanović (SRB); Matan Schwartz (ISR)

13 June 2015; 16:45	Report	Italy	12–5	France	Water Polo Arena, Baku

14 June 2015; 09:30	Report	Ukraine	3–12	France	Water Polo Arena, Baku; Referees: Marcela Mauss (GER); Massimo Angileri (MLT)
14 June 2015; 09:30	Report	Score by quarters: 0–2, 1–4, 1–5, 1–1			Water Polo Arena, Baku; Referees: Marcela Mauss (GER); Massimo Angileri (MLT)
14 June 2015; 09:30	Report	three players 1	Goals	Chandieu 3	Water Polo Arena, Baku; Referees: Marcela Mauss (GER); Massimo Angileri (MLT)

14 June 2015; 20:30	Report	Italy	9–8	Russia	Water Polo Arena, Baku; Referees: Juan Colominas (ESP); Radu Matache (ROU)
14 June 2015; 20:30	Report	Score by quarters: 3–2, 2–0, 4–1, 0–5			Water Polo Arena, Baku; Referees: Juan Colominas (ESP); Radu Matache (ROU)
14 June 2015; 20:30	Report	Del Basso 4	Goals	Zinnurov 4	Water Polo Arena, Baku; Referees: Juan Colominas (ESP); Radu Matache (ROU)

15 June 2015; 13:00	Report	Italy	18–6	Ukraine	Water Polo Arena, Baku; Referees: Brian Littlejohn (GBR); Martina Kuníková (SVK)
15 June 2015; 13:00	Report	Score by quarters: 4–0, 6–2, 4–3, 4–1			Water Polo Arena, Baku; Referees: Brian Littlejohn (GBR); Martina Kuníková (SVK)
15 June 2015; 13:00	Report	Del Basso 4	Goals	Dulin, Leshchenko 2	Water Polo Arena, Baku; Referees: Brian Littlejohn (GBR); Martina Kuníková (SVK)

15 June 2015; 16:45	Report	Russia	14–6	France	Water Polo Arena, Baku; Referees: Ivan Raković (SRB); Gábor Vogel (HUN)
15 June 2015; 16:45	Report	Score by quarters: 5–2, 2–3, 4–1, 3–0			Water Polo Arena, Baku; Referees: Ivan Raković (SRB); Gábor Vogel (HUN)
15 June 2015; 16:45	Report	Salimov 3	Goals	Marion-Vernoux 2	Water Polo Arena, Baku; Referees: Ivan Raković (SRB); Gábor Vogel (HUN)

=== Group B ===
Pos	Team	Pld	W	D	L	GF	GA	GD	Pts	Qualification
1	Hungary	3	3	0	0	50	14	+36	9	Quarterfinals
2	Germany	3	2	0	1	35	21	+14	6	Playoffs
3	Romania	3	1	0	2	17	34	−17	3	Playoffs
4	Azerbaijan (H)	3	0	0	3	16	49	−33	0	13–16th place semifinals

Source: Baku 2015
(H) Hosts

13 June 2015; 13:00	Report	Hungary	9–8	Germany	Water Polo Arena, Baku

13 June 2015; 18:45	Report	Azerbaijan	6–9	Romania	Water Polo Arena, Baku

14 June 2015; 09:30	Report	Romania	5–10	Germany	Water Polo Arena, Baku

14 June 2015; 18:45	Report	Hungary	23–3	Azerbaijan	Water Polo Arena, Baku

15 June 2015; 15:00	Report	Hungary	18–3	Romania	Water Polo Arena, Baku

15 June 2015; 18:45	Report	Azerbaijan	7–17	Germany	Water Polo Arena, Baku

=== Group C ===
Pos	Team	Pld	W	D	L	GF	GA	GD	Pts	Qualification
1	Croatia	3	2	1	0	41	29	+12	7	Quarterfinals
2	Greece	3	2	0	1	39	28	+11	6	Playoffs
3	Montenegro	3	1	1	1	34	33	+1	4	Playoffs
4	Turkey	3	0	0	3	15	39	−24	0	13–16th place semifinals

Source: Baku 2015

13 June 2015; 09:30	Report	Croatia	17–6	Turkey	Water Polo Arena, Baku

13 June 2015; 20:30	Report	Montenegro	12–16	Greece	Water Polo Arena, Baku

14 June 2015; 11:15	Report	Turkey	3–11	Greece	Water Polo Arena, Baku

14 June 2015; 15:00	Report	Montenegro	11–11	Croatia	Water Polo Arena, Baku

15 June 2015; 09:30	Report	Montenegro	11–6	Turkey	Water Polo Arena, Baku

15 June 2015; 20:30	Report	Croatia	13–12	Greece	Water Polo Arena, Baku

=== Group D ===
Pos	Team	Pld	W	D	L	GF	GA	GD	Pts	Qualification
1	Spain	3	3	0	0	46	22	+24	9	Quarterfinals
2	Serbia	3	2	0	1	41	18	+23	6	Playoffs
3	Slovakia	3	1	0	2	29	36	−7	3	Playoffs
4	Malta	3	0	0	3	15	55	−40	0	13–16th place semifinals

Source: Baku 2015

13 June 2015; 09:30	Report	Spain	22–4	Malta	Water Polo Arena, Baku

13 June 2015; 11:15	Report	Serbia	14–5	Slovakia	Water Polo Arena, Baku

14 June 2015; 13:00	Report	Malta	8–15	Slovakia	Water Polo Arena, Baku

14 June 2015; 16:45	Report	Serbia	9–10	Spain	Water Polo Arena, Baku

15 June 2015; 09:30	Report	Serbia	18–3	Malta	Water Polo Arena, Baku

15 June 2015; 11:15	Report	Spain	14–9	Slovakia	Water Polo Arena, Baku

== Final round ==
=== Bracket ===
Championship bracket

Playoffs; 16 June
Russia	11
Montenegro	8
Germany	13
Slovakia	7
Greece	16
France	7
Serbia	8
Romania	2

Quarterfinals; 17 June
Spain	14
Russia	9
Croatia	18
Germany	12
Hungary	13
Greece (PSO)	15
Italy	7
Serbia	8

Semifinals; 19 June
Spain	9
Croatia	8
Greece	12
Serbia (PSO)	13

Final; 21 June
Spain	7
Serbia	8
Third place
Croatia	10
Greece	11

5th place bracket

5–8th place semifinals
19 June
Russia	16
Germany	9
19 June
Hungary	10
Italy	11

Fifth place
21 June
Russia	6
Italy	11
Seventh place
21 June
Germany	6
Hungary	15

9th place bracket

9–12th place semifinals
17 June
Montenegro	9
Slovakia	8
17 June
France	7
Romania	5

Ninth place
19 June
Montenegro	15
France	4
Eleventh place
19 June
Slovakia	7
Romania	8

13th place bracket

13–16th place semifinals
16 June
Ukraine	9
Turkey	11
16 June
Azerbaijan	8
Malta	7

13th place
17 June
Turkey	11
Azerbaijan	6
15th place
17 June
Ukraine	13
Malta	8

=== Playoffs ===
16 June 2015; 14:15	Report	Russia	11–8	Montenegro	Water Polo Arena, Baku; Referees: Spyridon Achladiotis (GRE); Cornelis van der Loo (NED)
16 June 2015; 14:15	Report	Score by quarters: 4–2, 1–1, 3–4, 3–1			Water Polo Arena, Baku; Referees: Spyridon Achladiotis (GRE); Cornelis van der Loo (NED)
16 June 2015; 14:15	Report	four players 2	Goals	Saveljić 3	Water Polo Arena, Baku; Referees: Spyridon Achladiotis (GRE); Cornelis van der Loo (NED)

16 June 2015; 16:00	Report	Greece	16–7	France	Water Polo Arena, Baku

16 June 2015; 18:00	Report	Germany	13–7	Slovakia	Water Polo Arena, Baku

16 June 2015; 19:45	Report	Serbia	8–2	Romania	Water Polo Arena, Baku

=== Quarterfinals ===
17 June 2015; 14:15	Report	Russia	9–14	Spain	Water Polo Arena, Baku; Referees: Gábor Vogel (HUN); Cornelis van der Loo (NED)
17 June 2015; 14:15	Report	Score by quarters: 4–3, 2–2, 2–6, 1–3			Water Polo Arena, Baku; Referees: Gábor Vogel (HUN); Cornelis van der Loo (NED)
17 June 2015; 14:15	Report	Egorov 3	Goals	Granados 4	Water Polo Arena, Baku; Referees: Gábor Vogel (HUN); Cornelis van der Loo (NED)

17 June 2015; 16:00	Report	Greece	15–13 (PSO)	Hungary	Water Polo Arena, Baku
17 June 2015; 16:00	Report	Score by quarters: 3–3, 3–3, 3–1, 1–3 PSO: 5–3			Water Polo Arena, Baku

17 June 2015; 18:00	Report	Germany	12–18	Croatia	Water Polo Arena, Baku

17 June 2015; 19:45	Report	Serbia	8–7	Italy	Water Polo Arena, Baku

=== 13–16th place semifinals ===
16 June 2015; 10:30	Report	Ukraine	9–11	Turkey	Water Polo Arena, Baku; Referees: Andrej Laginja (SLO); Christian Landmann (GER)
16 June 2015; 10:30	Report	Score by quarters: 1–5, 2–1, 1–3, 5–2			Water Polo Arena, Baku; Referees: Andrej Laginja (SLO); Christian Landmann (GER)
16 June 2015; 10:30	Report	Dzyadyk 4	Goals	Yalçın 3	Water Polo Arena, Baku; Referees: Andrej Laginja (SLO); Christian Landmann (GER)

16 June 2015; 12:15	Report	Azerbaijan	8–7	Malta	Water Polo Arena, Baku

=== 9–12th place semifinals ===
17 June 2015; 18:00	Report	Montenegro	9–8	Slovakia	Water Polo Arena, Baku

17 June 2015; 19:45	Report	France	7–5	Romania	Water Polo Arena, Baku

=== 5–8th place semifinals ===
19 June 2015; 15:00	Report	Russia	16–9	Germany	Water Polo Arena, Baku; Referees: Konstantinos Kyranis (GRE); Brian Littlejohn (GBR)
19 June 2015; 15:00	Report	Score by quarters: 3–2, 4–1, 5–4, 4–2			Water Polo Arena, Baku; Referees: Konstantinos Kyranis (GRE); Brian Littlejohn (GBR)
19 June 2015; 15:00	Report	Pronin 3	Goals	Manolakis 4	Water Polo Arena, Baku; Referees: Konstantinos Kyranis (GRE); Brian Littlejohn (GBR)

19 June 2015; 17:30	Report	Hungary	10–11	Italy	Water Polo Arena, Baku

=== Semifinals ===
19 June 2015; 19:00	Report	Spain	9–8	Croatia	Water Polo Arena, Baku; Referees: Radu Matache (ROU); Daniele Bianco (ITA)
19 June 2015; 19:00	Report	Score by quarters: 1–2, 2–2, 4–0, 2–4			Water Polo Arena, Baku; Referees: Radu Matache (ROU); Daniele Bianco (ITA)
19 June 2015; 19:00	Report	De la Fuente 3	Goals	Dašić 4	Water Polo Arena, Baku; Referees: Radu Matache (ROU); Daniele Bianco (ITA)

19 June 2015; 20:30	Report	Greece	12–13 (PSO)	Serbia	Water Polo Arena, Baku; Referees: Gábor Vogel (HUN); Matan Schwartz (ISR)
19 June 2015; 20:30	Report	Score by quarters: 2–3, 2–3, 1–0, 2–1 PSO: 5–6			Water Polo Arena, Baku; Referees: Gábor Vogel (HUN); Matan Schwartz (ISR)
19 June 2015; 20:30	Report	Alexiou, Giannopoulos 2	Goals	Kasum, Šulc 2	Water Polo Arena, Baku; Referees: Gábor Vogel (HUN); Matan Schwartz (ISR)

=== 15th place game ===
17 June 2015; 14:15	Report	Ukraine	13–8	Malta	Water Polo Arena, Baku; Referees: Raul Torres (ESP); Christian Landmann (GER)
17 June 2015; 14:15	Report	Score by quarters: 3–2, 3–2, 4–2, 3–2			Water Polo Arena, Baku; Referees: Raul Torres (ESP); Christian Landmann (GER)
17 June 2015; 14:15	Report	Dzyadyk, Popyk 5	Goals	Plumpton 5	Water Polo Arena, Baku; Referees: Raul Torres (ESP); Christian Landmann (GER)

=== 13th place game ===
17 June 2015; 16:00	Report	Turkey	11–6	Azerbaijan	Water Polo Arena, Baku

=== Eleventh place game ===
19 June 2015; 12:00	Report	Slovakia	7–8	Romania	Water Polo Arena, Baku

=== Ninth place game ===
19 June 2015; 13:30	Report	Montenegro	15–4	France	Water Polo Arena, Baku

=== Seventh place game ===
21 June 2015; 13:00	Report	Germany	6–15	Hungary	Water Polo Arena, Baku; Referees: Florent Blanchard (FRA); Erkan Turkkan (TUR)
21 June 2015; 13:00	Report	Score by quarters: 2–5, 2–3, 1–3, 1–4			Water Polo Arena, Baku; Referees: Florent Blanchard (FRA); Erkan Turkkan (TUR)
21 June 2015; 13:00	Report	Manolakis 2	Goals	Burián 5	Water Polo Arena, Baku; Referees: Florent Blanchard (FRA); Erkan Turkkan (TUR)

=== Fifth place game ===
21 June 2015; 14:30	Report	Russia	6–11	Italy	Water Polo Arena, Baku; Referees: Matan Schwartz (ISR); Spyridon Achladiotis (GRE)
21 June 2015; 14:30	Report	Score by quarters: 3–2, 0–3, 1–4, 2–2			Water Polo Arena, Baku; Referees: Matan Schwartz (ISR); Spyridon Achladiotis (GRE)
21 June 2015; 14:30	Report	six players 1	Goals	four players 2	Water Polo Arena, Baku; Referees: Matan Schwartz (ISR); Spyridon Achladiotis (GRE)

=== Bronze medal game ===
21 June 2015; 18:00	Report	Croatia	10–11	Greece (bronze)	Water Polo Arena, Baku; Referees: Gábor Vogel (HUN); Raul Torres (ESP)
21 June 2015; 18:00	Report	Score by quarters: 3–5, 1–1, 5–3, 1–2			Water Polo Arena, Baku; Referees: Gábor Vogel (HUN); Raul Torres (ESP)
21 June 2015; 18:00	Report	Kreković 3	Goals	Papanastasiou 3	Water Polo Arena, Baku; Referees: Gábor Vogel (HUN); Raul Torres (ESP)

=== Final ===
21 June 2015; 19:30	Report	(silver) Spain	7–8	Serbia (gold)	Water Polo Arena, Baku; Referees: Mark Koganov (AZE); Daniele Bianco (ITA)
21 June 2015; 19:30	Report	Score by quarters: 3–2, 1–1, 2–4, 1–1			Water Polo Arena, Baku; Referees: Mark Koganov (AZE); Daniele Bianco (ITA)
21 June 2015; 19:30	Report	De la Fuente 3	Goals	Janković 3	Water Polo Arena, Baku; Referees: Mark Koganov (AZE); Daniele Bianco (ITA)

== Final standings ==
Rank	Team
1st place, gold medalist(s)	Serbia
2nd place, silver medalist(s)	Spain
3rd place, bronze medalist(s)	Greece
4	Croatia
5	Italy
6	Russia
7	Hungary
8	Germany
9	Montenegro
10	France
11	Romania
12	Slovakia
13	Turkey
14	Azerbaijan
15	Ukraine
16	Malta

== See also ==
- Water polo at the 2015 European Games – Women's tournament
