= Swimming at the 2015 European Games – Men's 4 × 100 metre freestyle relay =

Men's 4 × 100 metre freestyle relay at the 2015 European Games
- Venue: Aquatic Palace
- Dates: 23 June
- Competitors: 66 from 15 nations
- Winning time: 3:19.38

Medalists
gold medal	Duncan Scott; Martyn Walton; Daniel Speers; Cameron Kurle; Thomas Fannon	Great Britain
silver medal	Alessandro Miressi; Giovanni Izzo; Ivano Vendrame; Alessandro Bori; Manuel Frigo	Italy
bronze medal	Vladislav Kozlov; Aleksei Brianskiy; Elisei Stepanov; Igor Shadrin; Georg Gutmann; Sergei Sudakov	Russia

The men's 4 × 100 metre freestyle relay event at the 2015 European Games in Baku took place on 23 June at the Aquatic Palace.

== Results ==
=== Heats ===
The heats were started at 11:52.

Rank	Heat	Lane	Nation	Swimmers	Time	Notes
1	1	4	Ukraine	Vladyslav Perepelytsia (51.07) GR; Ivan Denysenko (51.17); Viacheslav Ohnov (49.88); Sergii Shevtsov (49.40)	3:21.52	Q, GR
2	1	3	Italy	Manuel Frigo (51.37); Alessandro Miressi (50.00); Ivano Vendrame (50.23); Giovanni Izzo (50.37)	3:21.97	Q
3	1	5	Russia	Georg Gutmann (51.61); Sergei Sudakov (50.89); Elisei Stepanov (50.12); Igor Shadrin (50.46)	3:23.08	Q
4	2	3	Germany	Paul Hentschel (51.09); Maximilian Forstenhäusler (51.59); Konstantin Walter (50.23); Alexander Lohmar (50.68)	3:23.59	Q
5	2	6	Great Britain	Martyn Walton (50.96); Daniel Speers (51.67); Thomas Fannon (52.56); Duncan Scott (49.26)	3:24.45	Q
6	2	7	Belgium	Thomas Thijs (51.35); Dries Vangoetsenhoven (51.77); Valentin Borisavljevic (51.11); Alexis Borisavljevic (50.48)	3:24.71	Q
7	2	1	Poland	Michał Brzuś (51.78); Juliusz Gosieniecki (51.51); Mateusz Arndt (51.42); Michał Chudy (50.93)	3:25.64	Q
8	1	2	Croatia	Bruno Blašković (51.60); Nikola Miljenić (51.37); Ante Lučev (51.46); Kristian Komlenić (51.77)	3:26.20	Q
9	2	2	Estonia	Daniel Zaitsev (51.77); Cevin Siim (51.16); Andrei Gussev (53.02); Nikita Tsernosev (51.45)	3:27.40	
10	2	8	Israel	Ziv Kalontarov (51.35); Mark Shperkin (51.46); Amir Haviv (52.82); Idan Dotan (52.72)	3:28.35	
11	1	6	Turkey	Erge Gezmis (51.84); Kaan Özcan (51.82); Samet Alkan (52.18); Batuhan Hakan (53.26)	3:29.10	
12	2	4	Switzerland	Olivier Petignat (52.91); Manuel Leuthard (51.68); Andrea Mozzini Vellen (52.23); Cla Remund (52.56)	3:29.38	
13	1	1	Romania	Robert Glință (51.14); Bogdan Petre (54.63); Bogdan Scarlat (54.63); Gabriel Sonoc (52.29)	3:32.69	
14	2	5	Azerbaijan	Ivan Andrianov (52.74); Dorian Fazekas (53.29); Kamran Jafarov (56.72); Qriqoriy Kalminskiy (54.31)	3:37.06	
	1	7	Norway	Marius Solaat Rødland (51.30); Sigurd Holten Bøen (51.90); Eivind Bjelland; Ole-Mikal Fløgstad	DSQ	

=== Final ===
The final was held at 19:42.

Rank	Lane	Nation	Swimmers	Time	Notes
1st place, gold medalist(s)	2	Great Britain	Duncan Scott (49.46) GR; Martyn Walton (49.43); Daniel Speers (50.68); Cameron Kurle (49.81)	3:19.38	GR
2nd place, silver medalist(s)	5	Italy	Alessandro Miressi (50.09); Giovanni Izzo (50.34); Ivano Vendrame (50.21); Alessandro Bori (49.55)	3:20.19	
3rd place, bronze medalist(s)	3	Russia	Vladislav Kozlov (50.44); Aleksei Brianskiy (50.09); Elisei Stepanov (49.76); Igor Shadrin (49.93)	3:20.22	
4	4	Ukraine	Vladyslav Perepelytsia (50.96); Ivan Denysenko (50.33); Viacheslav Ohnov (50.48); Sergii Shevtsov (49.29)	3:21.06	
5	6	Germany	Marek Ulrich (50.70); Alexander Lohmar (50.57); Konstantin Walter (50.49); Paul Hentschel (50.95)	3:22.71	
6	1	Poland	Michał Chudy (51.32); Paweł Sendyk (50.28); Michał Brzuś (50.40); Mateusz Arndt (50.98)	3:22.98	
7	7	Belgium	Thomas Thijs (51.15); Dries Vangoetsenhoven (51.51); Valentin Borisavljevic (50.72); Alexis Borisavljevic (50.80)	3:24.18	
8	8	Croatia	Bruno Blašković (51.71); Nikola Miljenić (51.08); Ante Lučev (51.50); Kristian Komlenić (52.15)	3:26.44	
