= Great Britain at the 2015 European Games =

- IOC code: GBR
- NOC: British Olympic Association
- Website: www.teamgb.com

in Baku, Azerbaijan 13 – 28 June 2015
- Competitors: 160 in 13 sports
- Flag bearers: Nicola Adams (opening); Joe Joyce (closing)
- Officials: Lord Coe
- Medals Ranked 3rd: Gold 18 Silver 11 Bronze 18 Total 47

European Games appearances (overview)
- 2015; 2019; 2023; 2027

Great Britain participated at the 2015 European Games, in Baku, Azerbaijan from 12 to 28 June 2015. As this was the inaugural Games, this was Great Britain's first appearance.

== Before the Games ==
On 17 October 2014, the British Olympic Association announced that 14 sports and 20 disciplines were seeking qualification for the games.

On 23 April 2015, the British Olympic Association announced the selection of a team of 153 athletes to compete at the Games with a further 10 male boxers to be chosen shortly. Although Great Britain had won several quota places in both badminton and cycling they have chosen not to participate in these sports in Baku. On 6 May 2015, the British Olympic Association named an additional ten athletes – 9 boxing, 1 shooting – to complete the British team to compete in Baku.

On 2 June 2015, it was announced that five athletes had withdrawn from the British team: Lisa Whiteside (boxing), Tyesha Mattis and Rebecca Tunney (both artistic gymnastics), and Helen Jenkins and Jess Learmonth (both triathlon). Mattis and Tunney were replaced by Charlie Fellows and Georgina Hockenhull.

== Games Summary ==
Great Britain left the inaugural Games with a total of 47 medals (18 gold, 10 silver, and 19 bronze), finishing third in the medal table rankings, and fourth in the total number of medal rankings. At least one medal was awarded to Team GB in nine sports, seven of them contained at least one gold. Great Britain topped the medal table in triathlon, and diving, although the most successful sport for Great Britain was swimming, with 23 medals, seven gold.

Seventeen British athletes won more than a single European Games medal in Baku, with the most successful being swimmers Duncan Scott, with three golds and three silvers, both the most successful (three golds) and most decorated (six medals) athlete and Luke Greenback with two golds and two silvers, as well as a world junior record in 200 metres backstroke, the only other multiple gold medalist. Abbie Wood, with one gold, one silver and two bronze medals was the most successful female competitor for Great Britain, and one of three athletes, with diver James Heatly and fellow swimmer Martyn Walton, to win at least one medal of every colour. Georgia Coates, with five medals, was the most decorated female competitor for Great Britain at the Games.

The first medal, and gold medal, won at the Games, and by extension the first ever European Games medal and gold medal ever won by Great Britain was achieved by Gordon Benson in men's triathlon; in doing so, he guaranteed a place in the men's triathlon for Great Britain, though not necessarily for himself, at the 2016 Summer Olympics. His win also continued Great Britain's dominance of the event, holding titles at European, European Games, Commonwealth Games, Youth Olympic and Olympic Games levels.

In the fencing hall, Richard Kruse, Marcus Mepstead, and Ben Peggs won the gold in team foil, defeating Olympic champions Italy, and winning Great Britain's first team fencing medal at European or Global level in fifty years, and the first gold ever at that level.

Seventeen-year-old Amber Hill overcame a marathon shoot off in the final to claim Britain's only shooting Gold in women's skeet, while the pool proved a happy hunting ground, with eleven golds across swimming and diving.

In the boxing hall, Nicola Adams continued her domination of her weight category, to add European Games gold to her Commonwealth and Olympic Games titles. Joe Joyce maintained Great Britain's grip on the super-heavyweight division, taking gold to echo the achievements of Anthony Joshua in the 2012 Summer Olympics. On the taekwondo mat, Jade Jones added the European Games gold to her Olympic title, only months after a controversial loss at the World Championships. Newcomer, and converted kickboxer Charlie Maddock also won gold, but Bianca Walkden was unable to repeat her World title success. Meanwhile, the publicised rivalry between former Great Britain athlete Aaron Cook, now fighting for Moldova, and Olympic bronze medalist Lutalo Mohommad failed to materialise as both lost early in their competition. However, as in 2012, Mohommad recovered to take bronze through the repechage.

== After the Games ==
At the closing ceremony, the flag of Great Britain was brought by Joe Joyce. Although the Games received limited coverage in Great Britain, shown domestically only on BT Sport, a subscription channel, the success of the team, particularly of Olympic champions Adams and Jones helped drive interest. By the conclusion of the Games it was reported that Manchester was considering bidding for the 2023 edition of the Games; following the award of the 2018 European Championships to Glasgow, Scotland and the 2022 Commonwealth Games to Birmingham, England, no further interest in hosting the Games was registered.

== Medal summary ==
The following British competitors won medals at the Games.

Medal	Name	Sport	Event	Date
Gold	Gordon Benson	Triathlon	Men's triathlon	14 June
Gold	Charlie Maddock	Taekwondo	Women's −49kg	16 June
Gold	Jade Jones	Taekwondo	Women's −57kg	17 June
Gold	Lois Toulson	Diving	Women's platform	18 June
Gold	Amber Hill	Shooting	Women's skeet	20 June
Gold	James Heatly	Diving	Men's 3m springboard	20 June
Gold	Matty Lee	Diving	Men's 10m platform	21 June
Gold	Katherine Torrance	Diving	Women's 3m springboard	21 June
Gold	Abbie Wood	Swimming	Women's 400m ind. medley	23 June
Gold	Holly Hibbott	Swimming	Women's 800m freestyle	23 June
Gold	Great Britain; Duncan Scott; Daniel Speers; Martyn Walton; Tom Fannon; Cameron Kurle; Matthew Lee	Swimming	Men's 4 × 100 m freestyle relay	23 June
Gold	Luke Greenbank	Swimming	Men's 100m backstroke	24 June
Gold	Nicola Adams	Boxing	Women's 51kg	25 June
Gold	Duncan Scott	Swimming	Men's 100m freestyle	25 June
Gold	Luke Greenbank	Swimming	Men's 200m backstroke	26 June
Gold	Joe Joyce	Boxing	Men's +91 kg	26 June
Gold	Great Britain; Richard Kruse; Marcus Mepstead; Alexander Tofalides; Ben Peggs	Fencing	Men's team foil	27 June
Gold	Duncan Scott	Swimming	Men's 200m freestyle	27 June
Silver	Ed McKeever	Canoe sprint	Men's K1-200m	16 June
Silver	Lani Belcher	Canoe sprint	Women's K1-5000m	16 June
Silver	James Heatly; Ross Haslam	Diving	Men's 3m synchronised springboard	19 June
Silver	Katherine Driscoll	Gymnastics	Women's trampoline	21 June
Silver	Great Britain; Duncan Scott; Martyn Walton; Georgia Coates; Darcy Deakin; Hannah Featherstone; Madeleine Crompton; Daniel Speers; Cameron Kurle	Swimming	Mixed 4 × 100 m freestyle relay	24 June
Silver	Jarvis Parkinson	Swimming	Men's 200m ind. medley	25 June
Silver	Great Britain; Duncan Scott; Martyn Walton; Kyle Chisholm; Cameron Kurle	Swimming	Men's 4 × 200 m freestyle relay	25 June
Silver	Amelia Clynes	Swimming	Women's 100m butterfly	26 June
Silver	Great Britain; Luke Greenbank; Charlie Attwood; Amelia Clynes; Georgia Coates; Joe Litchfield; Luke Davies; Abbie Wood; Hannah Featherstone	Swimming	Mixed 4 x 100 metre medley relay	26 June
Silver	Cameron Kurle	Swimming	Men's 200m freestyle	27 June
Silver	Great Britain; Duncan Scott; Charlie Attwood; Martyn Walton; Luke Greenbank; Cameron Kurle; Kyle Chisholm; Luke Davies; Joe Hulme	Swimming	Men's 4 × 100 m medley relay	27 June
Bronze	James Heatly	Diving	Men's 1m springboard	18 June
Bronze	Lutalo Muhammad	Taekwondo	Men's −80kg	18 June
Bronze	Ryan Bartlett; Hannah Baughn	Gymnastics	Mixed acrobatics pair all-around	19 June
Bronze	Brinn Bevan	Gymnastics	Men's pommel horse	20 June
Bronze	Ryan Bartlett; Hannah Baughn	Gymnastics	Mixed acrobatics pair dynamic	21 June
Bronze	Ryan Bartlett; Hannah Baughn	Gymnastics	Mixed acrobatics pair balance	21 June
Bronze	Great Britain Holly Hibbott; Madeleine Crompton; Georgia Coates; Darcy Deakin; Hannah Featherstone	Swimming	Women's 4 × 100 m freestyle relay	23 June
Bronze	Qais Ashfaq	Boxing	Men's 59kg	24 June
Bronze	Luke Davies	Swimming	Men's 200m breaststroke	24 June
Bronze	Sandy Ryan	Boxing	Women's 64kg	25 June
Bronze	Layla Black	Swimming	Women's 200m breaststroke	25 June
Bronze	Martyn Walton	Swimming	Men's 200m ind. medley	25 June
Bronze	Great Britain; Emma Cain; Rebecca Sherwin; Darcy Deakin; Abbie Wood; Layla Black; Georgia Coates; Amelia Clynes	Swimming	Women's 4 × 100 m medley relay	25 June
Bronze	Josh Kelly	Boxing	Men's 64kg	26 June
Bronze	Laura Stephens	Swimming	Women's 100m butterfly	26 June
Bronze	Great Britain; Holly Hibbott; Madeleine Crompton; Georgia Coates; Darcy Deakin; Hannah Featherstone	Swimming	Women's 4 × 200 m freestyle relay	27 June
Bronze	Abbie Wood	Swimming	Women's 100m ind. medley	27 June
Bronze	Charlie Attwood	Swimming	Men's 100m breaststroke	27 June

=== Multiple medalists ===
The following Team GB competitors won multiple medals at the 2015 European Games.

Name	Medal	Sport	Event	Date
Duncan Scott	Gold; Gold; Gold; Silver; Silver; Silver	Swimming	Men's 200 metre freestyle Men's 100 metre freestyle Men's 4 x 100 metre freestyle relay Mixed 4 x 100 metre freestyle relay Men's 4 x 200 metre freestyle relay Men's 4 x 100 metre medley relay	27 June; 25 June; 23 June; 24 June; 25 June; 27 June
Luke Greenbank	Gold; Gold; Silver; Silver	Swimming	Men's 100 metre backstroke Men's 200 metre backstroke Mixed 4 x 100 metre medley relay Men's 4 x 100 metre medley relay	24 June; 26 June; 26 June; 27 June
Cameron Kurle	Gold; Silver; Silver; Silver; Silver	Swimming	Men's 4 x 100 metre freestyle relay Mixed 4 x 100 metre freestyle relay Men's 4 x 200 metre freestyle relay Men's 4 x 100 metre medley relay Men's 200 metre freestyle	23 June; 24 June; 25 June; 27 June; 27 June
Martyn Walton	Gold; Silver; Silver; Silver; Bronze	Swimming	Men's 4 x 100 metre freestyle relay Mixed 4 x 100 metre freestyle relay Men's 4 x 200 metre freestyle relay Men's 4 x 100 medley freestyle relay Men's 200 metre ind. medley	23 June; 24 June; 25 June; 27 June; 25 June
James Heatly	Gold; Silver; Bronze	Diving	Men's 3m springboard Men's 3m synchro springboard Men's 1m springboard	20 June; 19 June; 18 June
Abbie Wood	Gold; Silver; Bronze; Bronze	Swimming	Women's 400 metre ind. medley Mixed 4 x 100 metre medley relay Women's 4 x 100 metre medley relay Women's 200 metre ind. medley	23 June; 27 June; 25 June; 27 June
Daniel Speers	Gold; Silver	Swimming	Men's 4 x 100 metre freestyle relay Mixed 4 x 100 metre freestyle relay	23 June; 24 June
Holly Hibbott	Gold; Bronze; Bronze	Swimming	Women's 400 metre freestyle Women's 4 x 100 metre freestyle relay Women's 4 x 100 metre freestyle relay	23 June; 23 June; 27 June
Georgia Coates	Silver; Silver; Bronze; Bronze; Bronze	Swimming	Mixed 4 x 100 metre freestyle relay Mixed 4 x 100 metre medley relay Women's 4 x 100 metre freestyle relay Women's 4 x 100 metre medley relay Women's 4 x 200 metre freestyle relay	24 June; 27 June; 23 June; 25 June; 27 June
Hannah Featherstone	Silver; Silver; Bronze; Bronze	Swimming	Mixed's 4 x 100 metre freestyle relay Mixed 4 x 100 metre medley relay Women's 4 x 100 metre medley relay Women's 4 x 200 metre freestyle relay	23 June; 27 June; 25 June; 27 June
Luke Davies	Silver; Silver; Bronze	Swimming	Mixed 4 x 100 metre freestyle relay Men's 4 x 100 metre medley relay Men's 200 metre breaststroke	26 June; 27 June; 24 June
Charlie Attwood	Silver; Silver; Bronze	Swimming	Mixed 4 x 100 metre freestyle relay Men's 4 x 100 metre medley relay Men's 100 metre breaststroke	26 June; 27 June; 27 June
Amelia Clynes	Silver; Silver; Bronze	Swimming	Women's 100 metre butterfly Mixed 4 x 100 metre medley relay Women's 4 x 100 metre medley relay	26 June; 27 June; 25 June
Kyle Chisholm	Silver; Silver	Swimming	Men's 4 x 200 metre freestyle relay Men's 4 x 100 metre freestyle relay	26 June; 27 June
Darcy Deakin	Silver; Bronze; Bronze; Bronze	Swimming	Mixed 4 x 100 metre freestyle relay Women's 4 x 100 metre freestyle relay Women's 4 x 100 metre medley relay Women's 4 x 200 metre freestyle relay	24 June; 23 June; 25 June; 27 June
Madeleine Crompton	Silver; Bronze; Bronze	Swimming	Mixed 4 x 100 metre freestyle relay Women's 4 x 100 metre freestyle relay Women's 4 x 200 metre freestyle relay	24 June; 23 June; 27 June
Ryan Bartlett	Bronze; Bronze; Bronze	Gymnastics	Mixed acrobatics pair all-around Mixed acrobatics pair dynamic Mixed acrobatics pair balance	19 June; 21 June; 21 June
Hannah Baughn	Bronze; Bronze; Bronze	Gymnastics	Mixed acrobatics pair all-around Mixed acrobatics pair dynamic Mixed acrobatics pair balance	19 June; 21 June; 21 June
Layla Black	Bronze; Bronze	Swimming	Women's 200 metre breaststroke Women's 4 x 100 metre medley relay	25 June; 25 June

Medals by sport
Sports	1st place, gold medalist(s)	2nd place, silver medalist(s)	3rd place, bronze medalist(s)	Total
Swimming	7	7	9	23
Diving	4	1	1	6
Boxing	2	0	3	5
Taekwondo	2	0	1	3
Fencing	1	0	0	1
Triathlon	1	0	0	1
Shooting	1	0	0	1
Canoe sprint	0	2	0	2
Gymnastics	0	1	4	5
Total	18	11	18	47
Rank				3rd

Medals by date
Day	Date	1st place, gold medalist(s)	2nd place, silver medalist(s)	3rd place, bronze medalist(s)	Total
1	13 June	0	0	0	0
2	14 June	1	0	0	1
3	15 June	0	0	0	0
4	16 June	1	2	0	3
5	17 June	1	0	0	1
6	18 June	1	0	2	3
7	19 June	0	1	1	2
8	20 June	2	0	1	3
9	21 June	2	1	2	5
10	22 June	0	0	0	0
11	23 June	3	0	1	4
12	24 June	1	1	2	4
13	25 June	2	2	4	8
14	26 June	2	2	2	6
15	27 June	2	2	3	7
16	28 June	0	0	0	0
Total		18	11	18	47
Rank					3rd

== Archery ==
Great Britain qualified for three quota places in the women's archery events at the Games, and as a result also qualified for the women's team event. Great Britain qualified for one quota place in the men's event, and as a result also qualified Great Britain for the mixed gender team event.

Great Britain endured mixed fortunes at the archery field, failing to qualify from the ranking round for the mixed pairs events, and failing to reach the quarter-finals in any of the disciplines; Kieran Slater's run to the last sixteen in the men's individual, where he lost narrowly to the French archer Plihon, was the strongest British performance.

Athlete	Event	Ranking round		Round of 64	Round of 32	Round of 16	Quarterfinals	Semifinals	Final / BM	
Athlete	Event	Score	Seed	Opposition Score	Opposition Score	Opposition Score	Opposition Score	Opposition Score	Opposition Score	Rank
Kieran Slater	Men's individual	645	43	Kozhin (Russia); W 6–2	Yilmaz (Turkey); W 6–0	Plihon (France); L 5–6	Did not advance			9
Naomi Folkard	Women's individual	633	25	Hunt (United Kingdom); L 0–6	Did not advance					25
Nicky Hunt	Women's individual	621	40	Folkard (United Kingdom); W 6–0	Erdyniyeva (Russia); L 4–6	Did not advance				=17
Amy Oliver	Women's individual	604	53	Longova (Slovakia); L 0–6	Did not advance					53
Naomi Folkard; Nicky Hunt; Amy Oliver	Women's team	1858	12	—N/a		Georgia (Georgia (country)); L 3–5	Did not advance			12
Naomi Folkard; Kieran Slater	Mixed team	1278	16*	—N/a		Did not advance				17*

- Azerbaijan as host gained automatic entry into the last sixteen despite a lower qualification score.

== Boxing ==
Great Britain qualified four quota places in the women's boxing events, and ten in the men's events, at the Games. The female members of the British boxing squad were confirmed on 23 April 2015. On 6 May 2015, the names of nine boxers were added to the British squad.

Great Britain had a relatively successful Games in the boxing ring, with four medals from 14 classes, highlighted by the victories of Olympic and Commonwealth Games champion, and Great Britain flagbearer, Nicola Adams, and Commonwealth Games super-heavyweight champion Joe Joyce, and a first senior medal for Sandy Ryan. Top seed Anthony Fowler lost in his first round bout, as did former world champion and Olympian Savannah Marshall. Great Britain finished fourth in the boxing medal table, narrowly behind Ireland, but well behind superpowers Russia and hosts Azerbaijan.

Men

Athlete	Event	Round of 32	Round of 16	Quarterfinals	Semifinals	Final	
Athlete	Event	Opposition Result	Opposition Result	Opposition Result	Opposition Result	Opposition Result	Rank
Harvey Horn	49 kg	—N/a	Sagaluev (Russia); L 3–0	Did not advance			
Muhammad Ali	52 kg	Riscan (Moldova); W 3–0	Picardi (Italy); L 0–3	Did not advance			
Qais Ashfaq	56 kg	Gogatishvili (Georgia (country)); W 3–0	Selcuk (Turkey); W 2–1	El-Hag (Germany); W 3–0	Asanau (Belarus); L 0–3	Did not advance	3rd place, bronze medalist(s)
Luke McCormack	60 kg	Matsagkos (Greece); W 3–0	Oumiha (France); L 0–3	Did not advance			
Sam Maxwell	64 kg	Bye	Goyeram (Sweden); L 1–2	Did not advance			
Josh Kelly	69 kg	Bye	Nuridzinau (Belarus); W 2–1	Nolan (Republic of Ireland); W 2–1	Baghirov (Azerbaijan); L 0–3	Did not advance	3rd place, bronze medalist(s)
Antony Fowler	75 kg	Bye	Cavallaro (Italy); L 0–3	Did not advance			
Joshua Buatsi	81 kg	Mammadov (Azerbaijan); L 0–3	did not advance				
Joe Joyce	+91 kg	Bye	Zavatin (Moldova); W KOR1	Vinivicius (Lithuania); W TKOR1	Yoka (France); W 3–0	Gimbatov (Russia); W 3–0	1st place, gold medalist(s)

Women

Athlete	Event	Round of 16	Quarterfinals	Semifinals	Final	
Athlete	Event	Opposition Result	Opposition Result	Opposition Result	Opposition Result	Rank
Nicola Adams	51 kg	Ancsin (Hungary); W 3–0	Petrova (Bulgaria); W 2–0	Coskun (Turkey); W 3–0	Drabik (Poland) – W 2–0	1st place, gold medalist(s)
Sandy Ryan	64 kg	Rogge (Germany); W 3–0	Vystropova (Azerbaijan); W 2–1	Beliakova (Russia); L 3–0	Did not advance	3rd place, bronze medalist(s)
Savannah Marshall	75 kg	Fontijn (Netherlands); L 0–3	Did not advance			

== Canoe Sprint ==
Great Britain secured places in the following events based on performances at the 2014 Canoe Sprint European Championships.

At the canoeing lake, Great Britain were competitive, reaching a number of finals. Their only medal in an Olympic event, however, came from London 2012 champion Ed McKeever, winning silver in his men's K-1 200 metre event. Lani Belcher won Great Britain's other canoeing medal, a silver in the non-Olympic women's canoe marathon event.

Men

Athlete	Event	Heats		Semifinals		Final	
Athlete	Event	Time	Rank	Time	Rank	Time	Rank
Ed McKeever	K1 200 m	34.984	1 Q	bye		35.774	2nd place, silver medalist(s)
Jonathan Boyton	K1 1000 m	3:38.877	3	3:27.898	3 Q	3:37.036	9
Timothy Pendle	K1 5000 m	—N/a				DNF	–
Liam Heath; Jon Schofield	K2 200 m	31.606	2 Q	bye		32.518	4
Andrew Daniels; Timothy Pendle	K2 1000 m	3:18.017	7	3:16.984	8	did not advance	
Christopher Calvert	C1 200 m	41.371	5	40.816	6 Q	43.341	8
James Styan	C1 1000 m	4:11.007	5	3:52.822	7	did not advance	

Women

Athlete	Event	Heats		Semifinals		Final	
Athlete	Event	Time	Rank	Time	Rank	Time	Rank
Rachel Cawthorn	K1 200 m	42.254	7	40.462	3 Q	43.455	9
Rachel Cawthorn	K1 500 m	1:53.226	2	1:48.028	1 Q	2:08.423	8
Lani Belcher	K1 5000 m	—N/a				23:05.625	2nd place, silver medalist(s)
Angela Hannah; Emily Lewis	K2 200 m	DNF	–	did not advance			
Hayleigh Mason; Louisa Sawers	K2 500 m	1:42.205	5	1:40.168	4	did not advance	
Lani Belcher; Angela Hannah; Hayleigh Mason; Louisa Sawers	K4 500 m	1:35.191	2 Q	bye		1:36.439	8

== Diving ==
Following the European Junior Diving Championships held in July 2014, LEN informed British Swimming that they would receive a full quota of places at the Games. The diving events were all junior events for boys under 18 and girls under 16, and doubled as the European Junior Diving Championships for 2015

Great Britain enjoyed huge success in the diving pool, topping the medal table with four golds, a silver and a bronze. James Heatly, having won bronze in the men's 1 metre springboard event, became Great Britain's first multiple medalist in the European Games when he took his second medal, a silver, in the men's synchronized springboard beside Ross Haslam, and went on to complete the set with victory in the men's 3 metre springboard event. Matty Lee and Lois Toulson both took gold in the high platform events, Toulson arguably with the dive of the Games. Katherine Torrance matched Heatly with victory in the women's 3 metre springboard.

Men

Athlete	Event	Preliminaries		Final	
Athlete	Event	Points	Rank	Points	Rank
James Heatly	1 m springboard	481.50	4 Q	483.40	3rd place, bronze medalist(s)
Jordan Houlden	1 m springboard	451.85	9 Q	453.15	9
Jordan Houlden	3 m springboard	473.90	9 Q	511.90	4
James Heatly	3 m springboard	508.95	2 Q	541.65	1st place, gold medalist(s)
Matthew Dixon	platform	441.60	6 Q	493.85	4
Matty Lee	platform	514.45	2 Q	588.25	1st place, gold medalist(s)
Ross Haslam; James Heatly	3 m synchronised springboard	—N/a		286.05	2nd place, silver medalist(s)

Women

Athlete	Event	Preliminaries		Final	
Athlete	Event	Points	Rank	Points	Rank
Millie Fowler	1 m springboard	393.40	2 Q	383.20	6
Katherine Torrance	1 m springboard	386.15	7 Q	379.35	8
Lydia Rosenthall	3 m springboard	427.25	2 Q	395.60	8
Katherine Torrance	3 m springboard	431.15	1 Q	448.25	1st place, gold medalist(s)
Shanice Lobb	platform	377.40	5 Q	397.70	4
Lois Toulson	platform	389.20	2 Q	456.70	1st place, gold medalist(s)
Millie Fowler; Millie Haffety	3 m synchronised springboard	—N/a		216.95	9

== Fencing ==
Team Events

Athlete	Event	Quarterfinal	Semifinal	Final	Rank
Athlete	Event	Match 1 Opposition Score	Match 2 Opposition Score	Match 3 Opposition Score	Rank
Great Britain; Richard Kruse; Marcus Mepstead; Alexander Tofalides	Men's Team Foil	Germany; Doerr; Uftring; Perelmann; W 45–26	France; Pauty; Tony Helissey; Simon; W 45–41	Italy; Nista; Focone; Rosatelli; W 45–41	1st place, gold medalist(s)

Individual events

Pool Stages

Athlete	Event	Group phase						Rank
Athlete	Event	Match 1 Opposition Score	Match 2 Opposition Score	Match 3 Opposition Score	Match 4 Opposition Score	Match 5 Opposition Score	Match 6 Opposition Score	Rank
James Honeybone	Men's Sabre	Dolniceanu (Romania); W 5–4	Ant (Turkey); W 5–0	Tsouroutas (Greece); W 5–1	Casares (Spain); L 2–5	Taghiyev (Azerbaijan); W 5–4	—N/a	3 Q W4 L1
Richard Kruse	Men's foil	Pauty (France); W 5–3	Rosatelli (Italy); L 4–5	Babaoglu (Turkey); W 5–3	Arslanov (Russia); L 2–5	Janda (Poland); L 1–5	—N/a	3 Q W2 L3
Marcus Mepstead	Men's foil	Kontachristopolous (Greece); L 3–4	Daraban (Romania); W 5–2	Deorr (Germany); W 5–2	Foconi (Spain); L 0–5	Rajski (Poland); L 3–5	—N/a	3 Q W2 L3
Ben Peggs	Men's foil	Yunes (Ukraine); L 3–5	Kahl (Germany); L 3–5	Coupenitch (Czech Republic); L 3–5	Helissey (France); L 3–5	Nemeth (Hungary); L 1–5	—N/a	6 DNA; W0 L5
Alexander Tofalides	Men's foil	Uftring (Germany); L 1–5	Or (Israel); W 5–3	Surwillo (Poland); L 4–5	Safin (Russia); L 3–5	Pranz (Austria); L 4–5	—N/a	5 DNA; W1 L4
Corinna Lawrence	Women's Épée	Caran (Serbia); W 5–3	Bohus (Hungary); W 5–3	Batini (Italy); L 2–5	Kirpu (Estonia); L 0–5	Kochneva (Russia); L 2–3	Huseynova (Azerbaijan); W 5–3	4 Q W3 L3
Natalia Sheppard	Women's foil	Goglidze (Georgia (country)); W 5–4	Boldor (Romania); W 4–3	Sauer (Germany); L 1–4	Hatuel (Israel); W 4–3	Huin (France); W 5–4	—N/a	2 Q W4 L1
Aliya Itzkowitz	Women's Sabre	Zhovnir (Ukraine); W 5–2	Bunyatova (Azerbaijan); L 3–5	Pascu (Romania); W 5–4	Gevaert (Belgium); W 5–2	Kovaleva (France); W 5–3	—N/a	2 Q W4 L1

Q – qualified for knockout stages

Elimination rounds

Athlete	Event	Elimination phase					Rank
Athlete	Event	1/16 Opposition Score	1/8 Opposition Score	Quarterfinal Opposition Score	Semifinal Opposition Score	Final/BM Opposition Score	Rank
James Honeybone	Men's Sabre	Bucur (Romania); W 15–6	Dolniceanu (Romania); L 10–15	Did not advance			
Richard Kruse	Men's Foil	Tony Helissey (France); L 9–15	Did not advance				
Marcus Mepstead	Men's Foil	Ingargiola (Italy); L 14–15	Did not advance				
Corinna Lawrence	Women's Épée	Tataran (Romania); W 15–10	Rizzi (Italy); L 12–15	Did not advance			
Natalia Sheppard	Women's Foil	Walczyk (Poland); W 13–7	Golubytskyi (Germany); L 12–13	Did not advance			
Aliya Itzkowitz	Women's Sabre	Watora (Poland); L 12–15	Did not advance				

== Gymnastics ==
=== Acrobatic ===
Great Britain qualified five athletes based on performances at the 2014 Acrobatic Gymnastics World Championships. The event was seen as a showcase for an event and athletes not currently included in Olympic competition.

Acrobatic mixed pair Ryan Bartlett and Hannah Baughn enjoyed a very successful games, winning three bronze medals, placing third in each of the mixed pairs disciplines. their success boosted Great Britain's overall tally of medals in gymnastics to five.

Team

Athlete	Event	Qualification		Final	
Athlete	Event	Total	Rank	Total	Rank
Jennifer Bailey; Cicely Irwin; Josie Russell	Women's group all-around	—N/a		25.520	6
Jennifer Bailey; Cicely Irwin; Josie Russell	Women's group balance	28.190	3 Q	25.800	6
Jennifer Bailey; Cicely Irwin; Josie Russell	Women's group dynamic	28.040	4 Q	27.690	6
Ryan Bartlett; Hannah Baughn	Mixed pair all-around	—N/a		28.350	3rd place, bronze medalist(s)
Ryan Bartlett; Hannah Baughn	Mixed pair balance	28.360	3 Q	26.260	3rd place, bronze medalist(s)
Ryan Bartlett; Hannah Baughn	Mixed pair dynamism	28.450	3 Q	28.650	3rd place, bronze medalist(s)

=== Aerobic ===
Great Britain has qualified five athletes after their performance at the 2013 Aerobic Gymnastics European Championships.

Athlete	Event	Qualification		Final	
Athlete	Event	Score	Rank	Score	Rank
Ella Augier; Chloe Farrance; Olivia Farrance; Sophie Groves; Kayleigh Silva	Mixed group	19.161	7 R1	Did not advance	

=== Artistic ===
Great Britain sent a mainly development team to the Games, with none of the bronze medal winning men's Olympic team, Youth Olympic champion Giarnni Regini-Moran or European medalists such as Daniel Keatings, Ellie or Becky Downie present. This development team contrasted with the strong senior squads sent by a number of other countries, and was reflected in lower finishes in the team events than in recent European Championships.

The team did however include double Commonwealth and five time European Junior champion Nile Wilson, making a comeback from injury, and successful junior Brinn Bevan on his senior debut. In the event, Wilson did not make any finals, but Bevan took the opportunity to win his first senior medal, a bronze, in pommel horse, an historically strong event for Great Britain. It was Great Britain's sole artistic gymnastics medal of the Games.

Men
Team

Athlete	Event	Qualification								Final							
Athlete	Event	Apparatus						Total	Rank	Apparatus						Total	Rank
Athlete	Event	F	PH	R	V	PB	HB	Total	Rank	F	PH	R	V	PB	HB	Total	Rank
Frank Baines	All-around	14.900 R3	–	–	14.866	–	–	27.399	–	—N/a							
Brinn Bevan	All-around	14.133	14.766 Q	13.866	15.033	14.800	13.666 R3	86.264	7QA	14.800	13.800	12.433	14.833	14.733	11.700	82.299	9
Nile Wilson	All-around	14.400	13.533	13.766	14.333	14.033	13.733	83.798	18	—N/a							
Brinn Bevan; Frank Baines; Nile Wilson	Team	—N/a								29.300	28.299	27.632	29.899	28.833	27.399	171.362	8

Apparatus finals

Athlete	Event	Qualification		Final	
Athlete	Event	Score	Rank	Score	Rank
Brinn Bevan	Men's pommel horse	14.766	3 Q	14.200	3rd place, bronze medalist(s)

Women
Team

Athlete	Event	Qualification						Final					
Athlete	Event	Apparatus				Total	Rank	Apparatus				Total	Rank
Athlete	Event	F	V	UB	BB	Total	Rank	F	V	UB	BB	Total	Rank
Charlie Fellows	All-Around	13.966	13.700	10.966 R1	13.166	51.798	24	—N/a					
Georgina Hockenhull	All-Around	13.533	11.166	13.833	12.600 Q	51.132	30	—N/a					
Kelly Simm	All-Around	14.233 R1	13.833Q	12.533	13.600	53.299	13 QA	14.133	14.266	10.233	13.300	51.932	11
Charlie Fellows; Georgina Hockenhull; Kelly Simm	Team	—N/a						28.199	26.633	26.366	26.766	107.964	8

Q : qualified for apparatus final QA : qualified for the All-Around final R : reserve for apparatus final

Apparatus finals

Athlete	Event	Qualification		Final	
Athlete	Event	Score	Rank	Score	Rank
Kelly Simm	Women's vault	13.883	6 Q	7.166	6
Georgina Hockenhull	Women's beam	13.833	6 Q	11.833	6

=== Trampoline ===
Great Britain qualified two athletes based on the results at the 2014 European Trampoline Championships. The female gymnasts competed in both the individual and the synchronized event.

Kat Driscoll won her first major international individual trampoline medal for Great Britain at the Games, having previously won several in synchronized trampoline.

Athlete	Event	Qualification		Final	
Athlete	Event	Score	Rank	Score	Rank
Luke Strong	Men's individual	52.050	27	Did not advance	
Katherine Driscoll	Women's individual	99.465	5 Q	53.910	2nd place, silver medalist(s)
Laura Gallagher	Women's individual	20.225	23	Did not advance	
Katherine Driscoll; Laura Gallagher	Women's synchronized	83.800	5 Q	43.200	5

== Judo ==
Great Britain endured a difficult time on the judo mat; reaching only one medal match, where Natalie Powell succumbed to a late attack to lose a bronze medal. Olympic medalist Gemma Gibbons lost early in her weight category, failing even to reach the repechage, and noted that her recent results had "not been good or consistent enough", mixing good wins with unnecessary losses, and that this was "a fight I need to be winning", while former Israeli judoka and World medalist Alice Schlesinger suffered a shock defeat to Ana Cachola.

Men

Athlete	Event	Round of 64	Round of 32	Round of 16	Quarterfinals	Semifinals	Repechage	Final / BM	
Athlete	Event	Opposition Result	Opposition Result	Opposition Result	Opposition Result	Opposition Result	Opposition Result	Opposition Result	Rank
Ashley McKenzie	60 kg	—N/a	Loreto (Italy); W 000-000 shido 2–1	Mooren (Netherlands); L 000-011	Did not advance				
Colin Oates	66 kg	—N/a	Van Gansbeke (Belgium); W 001-000	Oleinic (Portugal); L 000-001	Did not advance				
Owen Livesey	81 kg	—N/a	Mrvaljevic (Montenegro); W 100-000	Luz (Portugal); L 011-000	Did not advance				
Frazer Chamberlain	90 kg	Wenzinger (Switzerland); L 000-100	Did not advance						
Ben Fletcher	100 kg	—N/a	Bezzina (Malta); W 100-000	Grol (Netherlands); L 000-010	Did not advance				

Women

Athlete	Event	Round of 32	Round of 16	Quarterfinals	Semifinals	Repechage	Final / BM	
Athlete	Event	Opposition Result	Opposition Result	Opposition Result	Opposition Result	Opposition Result	Opposition Result	Rank
Kelly Edwards	52 kg	Stankevich (Armenia); W 001-000	Florian (Romania); L 010-100	Did not advance				
Nekoda Smythe-Davis	57 kg	Zabludina (Italy); L 000-011	Did not advance					
Alice Schlesinger	63 kg	Bernholm (Sweden); W 001-000	Cachola (Portugal); L 000-001	Did not advance				
Gemma Howell	63 kg	Drexler (Austria); W 000-000 shido 0–1	Hermansson (Portugal); L 000-010	Did not advance				
Sally Conway	70 kg	Samardzic (Bosnia and Herzegovina); W 100-000	Stam (Georgia (country)); W 101-001	Deidrich (Germany); L 000-001	Did not advance	Gercsak (Hungary) l 000-100	Did not advance	
Megan Fletcher	70 kg	Klys (Poland); L 002-000	Did not advance					
Natalie Powell	78 kg	bye	Dmitrieva (Russia); W 011-000	Verkerk (Netherlands); L 000-101	Did not advance	Joo (Hungary); W 100-000	FOR BRONZE; Velensek (Slovenia); L 00-100	5
Gemma Gibbons	78 kg	Molonga (France); W 010-001	Turks (Ukraine); L 000-100	Did not advance				
Sarah Adlington	+78 kg	Iaronka (Ukraine); 001-101	Did not advance					

== Shooting ==
Great Britain secured the maximum number of quotas in the shotgun events based on the European rankings on 31 December 2014. Quotas were also won in some of the rifle events.

Amber Hill, a 17-year-old skeet shooter won Great Britain's only shooting medal, the gold medal in women's skeet, following a marathon shoot-off. Steve Scott set the Games record in men's double trap qualification, but slipped to fifth in the semi-finals, missing out on a medal match.

Men

Athlete	Event	Qualification		Semi-final		Final	
Athlete	Event	Points	Rank	Points	Rank	Points	Rank
Jon Hammond	50 m rifle prone	612.8	20	—N/a		Did not advance	
Tim Kneale	Double trap	137	14	Did not advance			
Steve Scott	Double trap	142 GR	1 Q	28 (+11/12SO)	5	Did not advance	
Brad Davis	Trap	115	37	Did not advance			
Ed Ling	Trap	122	4 Q	12	4 QB	11	4
Jeremy Bird	Skeet	111	27	Did not advance			
Mike Gilligan	Skeet	120	13	Did not advance			

Women

Athlete	Event	Qualification		Semi-final		Final	
Athlete	Event	Points	Rank	Points	Rank	Points	Rank
Jennifer McIntosh	10 m air rifle	415	9	—N/a		Did not advance	
Seonaid McIntosh	10 m air rifle	414.2	11	—N/a		Did not advance	
Jennifer McIntosh	50 m rifle 3 positions	580.0	5 Q	—N/a		399.7	7
Charlotte Kerwood	Trap	67	17	Did not advance			
Abbey Ling	Trap	69	12	Did not advance			
Elena Allen	Skeet	67	14	Did not advance			
Amber Hill	Skeet	73	2 Q	16	=1 QG	15 (+30/30 so)	1st place, gold medalist(s)

SO – shoot-off GR – Games record QB – qualified for bronze medal match QG – qualified for gold and silver medals match

== Swimming ==
Following the European Junior Swimming Championships held in July 2014, LEN informed each NOC how many swimming quotas they would receive for the European Games. In December 2014, British Swimming published their selection criteria for the Games and confirmed that they would be sending a full team of 24 swimmers.

Ranks are given as overall placements.

Men

Athlete	Event	Heats		Semifinals		Final	
Athlete	Event	Time	Rank	Time	Rank	Time	Rank
Freestyle
Daniel Speers	Men's 50m freestyle	23.62	25	Did not advance			
Tom Fannon	Men's 50m freestyle	23.36	12 Q	23.03	10	Did not advance	
Daniel Speers	Men's 100m freestyle	53.93	57	Did not advance			
Cameron Kurle	Men's 100m freestyle	52.02	40	Did not advance			
Martyn Walton	Men's 100m freestyle	51.06	15 Q	53.21	16	Did not advance	
Duncan Scott	Men's 100m freestyle	50.24 GR	1 Q	49.81	2 Q	49.43 GR	1st place, gold medalist(s)
Kyle Chisholm	Men's 200m freestyle	1:51.18	7	Did not advance			
Cameron Kurle	Men's 200m freestyle	1:49,83	3 Q	1:49.50	2 Q	1:48.92	2nd place, silver medalist(s)
Martyn Walton	Men's 200m freestyle	1:51.19	14	Did not advance			
Duncan Scott	Men's 200m freestyle	1:49,39	2 Q	1:50.11	4 Q	1:48.55 GR	1st place, gold medalist(s)
Cameron Kurle	Men's 400m freestyle	3:56.03	12	—N/a		Did not advance	
Kyle Chisholm	Men's 400m freestyle	3:56.08	13	—N/a		Did not advance	
Tom Derbyshire	Men's 400m freestyle	4:02.82	36	—N/a		Did not advance	
Tom Derbyshire	Men's 1500m freestyle	—N/a				15:39.19	8
Backstroke
Luke Greenbank	Men's 100m backstroke	55.12 GR	1 Q	54.61 GR	1 Q	54.76	1st place, gold medalist(s)
Joe Hulme	Men's 100m backstroke	55.74	3 Q	55.36	5 Q	55.37	4
Joe Litchfield	Men's 100m backstroke	56.92	17	Did not advance			
Luke Greenbank	Men's 200m backstroke	1:59.06 GR	1 Q	1:57.53 GR	1 Q	1:56.89 GR WJR	1st place, gold medalist(s)
Joe Hulme	Men's 200m backstroke	2:01.11	4 Q	2:00.23	3 Q	2:00.16	5
Joe Lichfield	Men's 200m backstroke	2:03.71	13	Did not advance			
Breaststroke
Luke Davies	Men's 50m breaststroke	29.59	29	Did not advance			
Charlie Attwood	Men's 50m breaststroke	28.62	8 Q	28.55	9	Did not advance	
Tom Fannon	Men's 50m breaststroke	30.58	39	Did not advance			
Luke Davies	Men's 100m breaststroke	1:03.17	11 Q	1:03.21	9	Did not advance	
Charlie Attwood	Men's 100m breaststroke	1:01.93	2 Q	1:01.77	3 Q	1.01.71	3rd place, bronze medalist(s)
Luke Davies	Men's 200m breaststroke	2:12.75	2 Q	2:13.45	3 Q	2:13.45	3rd place, bronze medalist(s)
Charlie Attwood	Men's 200m breaststroke	2:14.78	4 Q	2:14.75	6 Q	2:13.62	4
Butterfly
Tom Fannon	Men's 50m butterfly	25.12	26	Did not advance			
Luke Greenbank	Men's 50m butterfly	25.20	32	Did not advance			
Joe Litchfield	Men's 200m butterfly	2:03.08	14 Q	2:02.32	12	Did not advance	
Kyle Chisholm	Men's 200m butterfly	2:03.15	16 Q	2:02.59	13	Did not advance	
Medley
Joe Hulme	Men's 200m ind. medley	2:07.09	21	Did not advance			
Jarvis Parkinson	Men's 200m ind. medley	2:04.62	12 Q	2:03.53	8 Q	2:01.94	2nd place, silver medalist(s)
Martyn Walton	Men's 200m ind. medley	2:04.01	7 Q	2: 03.17	5 Q	2:02.24	3rd place, bronze medalist(s)
Luke Greenbank	Men's 400m ind. medley	4:29.87	19	Did not advance			
Jarvis Parkinson	Men's 400m ind. medley	4:33.77	29	Did not advance			
Martyn Walton	Men's 400m ind. medley	4:29.59	18	Did not advance			
Joe Litchfield	Men's 400m ind. medley	4:26.08	9	Did not advance			
Relay
Great Britain; Duncan Scott; Daniel Speers; Martyn Walton; Thomas Fannon; Cameron Kurle; Matthew Lee	Men's 4 × 100 m freestyle relay	3:24.45	5 Q	—N/a		3:19.38 GR	1st place, gold medalist(s)
Great Britain; Duncan Scott; Kyle Chisholm; Martyn Walton; Cameron Kurle	Men's 4 × 200 m freestyle relay	7:25.91	2 Q	—N/a		7:19.36	2nd place, silver medalist(s)
Great Britain; Duncan Scott; Charlie Attwood; Martyn Walton; Luke Greenbank; Cameron Kurle; Kyle Chisholm; Luke Davies; Joe Hulme	Men's 4 × 100 m medley relay	3:46:43	5 Q	—N/a		3:39.01	2nd place, silver medalist(s)

Women

Athlete	Event	Heats		Semifinals		Final	
Athlete	Event	Time	Rank	Time	Rank	Time	Rank
Freestyle
Darcy Deakin	Women's 50m freestyle	26.78	20	Did not advance			
Hannah Featherstone	Women's 50m freestyle	26.93	25	Did not advance			
Madeleine Crompton	Women's 50m freestyle	27.41	38	Did not advance			
Darcy Deakin	Women's 100m freestyle	56.59	6 Q	56.61	7 Q	56.94	5
Georgia Coates	Women's 100m freestyle	56.96	8 Q	57.35	12	Did not advance	
Hannah Featherstone	Women's 100m freestyle	57.11	11	Did not advance			
Madeleine Crompton	Women's 100m freestyle	57.29	12	Did not advance			
Darcy Deakin	Women's 200m freestyle	2:03.44	5	Did not advance			
Holly Hibbott	Women's 200m freestyle	2:02.24	2 Q	2:02.02	4 Q	2:02.24	7
Hannah Featherstone	Women's 200m freestyle	2:02.68	4 Q	2:03.54	11	Did not advance	
Madeleine Crompton	Women's 200m freestyle	2:05.08	18	Did not advance			
Holly Hibbott	Women's 400m freestyle	4:16.53	4	—N/a		14:13.17	4
Madeleine Crompton	Women's 400m freestyle	4:23.29	16	—N/a		Did not advance	
Holly Hibbott	Women's 800m freestyle	—N/a				8:39.02 GR	1st place, gold medalist(s)
Backstroke
Rebecca Sherwin	Women's 50m backstroke	30.22	17 SO 2	Did not advance			
Rebecca Sherwin	Women's 100m backstroke	1:04.48	11 Q	1:04.56	12	Did not advance	
Rebecca Sherwin	Women's 200m backstroke	2:18.86	10 Q	2:16.50	6 Q	2:17.00	7
Breaststroke
Emma Cain	Women's 50m breaststroke	32.58	8 Q	32.64	12	Did not advance	
Layla Black	Women's 50m breaststroke	32.63	8 Q	32.30	5 Q	32.21	5
Emma Cain	Women's 100m breaststroke	1:10.79	4 Q	1:10.21	5 Q	1:10.42	5
Layla Black	Women's 100m breaststroke	1:10.92	5 Q	1:09.84	4 Q	1:09.26	4
Emma Cain	Women's 200m breaststroke	2:29.82	6	Did not advance			
Layla Black	Women's 200m breaststroke	2:28.71	2 Q	2:27.09	2 Q	2:27.61	3rd place, bronze medalist(s)
Abbie Wood	Women's 200m breaststroke	2:29.03	5	Did not advance			
Georgia Coates	Women's 200m breaststroke	2:28.75	3 Q	2:30.41	5 Q	2:29.93	5
Butterfly
Amelia Clynes	Women's 50m butterfly	28.55	28	Did not advance			
Laura Stephens	Women's 50m butterfly	27.79	7 Q	27.75	6 Q	27.49	6
Amelia Clynes	Women's 100m butterfly	1:00.93	3 Q	1:00.09	2 Q	1:00.12	2nd place, silver medalist(s)
Laura Stephens	Women's 100m butterfly	1:01.09	4 Q	1:00.77	6 Q	1:00.54	3rd place, bronze medalist(s)
Holly Hibbott	Women's 200m butterfly	2:12.07 GR	1 Q	2:12.69	6 Q	2:15.56	8
Amelia Clynes	Women's 200m butterfly	2:13.15	2 Q	2:12.65	5 Q	2:12.82	6
Laura Stephens	Women's 200m butterfly	2:13.69	5	Did not advance			
Medley
Abbie Wood	Women's 200m ind. medley	2:17.28	4 Q	2:15.34	3 Q	2:14.49	3rd place, bronze medalist(s)
Georgia Coates	Women's 200m ind. medley	2:17.35	6 Q	2:16.75	7 Q	2:15.07	5
Abbie Wood	Women's 400m ind. medley	4:45.61 GR	1 Q	—N/a		4:41.97 GR	1st place, gold medalist(s)
Georgia Coates	Women's 400m ind. medley	4:48.06	3 Q	—N/a		4:46.52	4
Relay
Great Britain; Holly Hibbott; Madeleine Crompton; Georgia Coates; Darcy Deakin; Hannah Featherstone	Women's 4 × 100 m freestyle relay	3:50.03	3 Q	—N/a		3:45.80	3rd place, bronze medalist(s)
Great Britain; Holly Hibbott; Madeleine Crompton; Georgia Coates; Darcy Deakin; Hannah Featherstone	Women's 4 × 200 m freestyle relay	8:14.76 GR	1 Q	—N/a		8:4.84	3rd place, bronze medalist(s)
Great Britain; Emma Cain; Rebecca Sherwin; Darcy Deakin; Abbie Wood; Layla Black; Georgia Coates; Amelia Clynes	Women's 4 × 100 m medley relay	4:13.43	2 Q	—N/a		4:09.10	3rd place, bronze medalist(s)

Mixed

Athlete	Event	Heats		Semifinals		Final	
Athlete	Event	Time	Rank	Time	Rank	Time	Rank
Relay
Great Britain; Duncan Scott; Martyn Walton; Georgia Coates; Darcy Deakin; Hannah Featherstone; Madeleine Crompton; Daniel Speers; Cameron Kurle	Mixed 4 × 100 m freestyle relay	3:38.66	4 Q	—N/a		3:32.65	2nd place, silver medalist(s)
Great Britain; Luke Greenbank; Charlie Attwood; Amelia Clynes; Georgia Coates; Luke Davies; Joe Litchfield; Abbie Wood; Hannah Featherstone	Mixed 4 × 100 m medley relay	3:58.25	3 Q	—N/a		3:52.03	2nd place, silver medalist(s)

== Synchronised Swimming ==
Great Britain secured a place in all the synchronised swimming events in Baku by finishing fifth at a qualifier held in Turkey in February, 2015.

- Team – Phoebe Bradley-Smith, Jorja Brown, Danielle Cooper, Jodie Cowie, Emma Critchley, Lara Hockin, Esme Lower, Genevieve Randall, Hannah Randall, Rebecca Richardson

Athlete	Event	Qualification		Final	
Athlete	Event	Points	Rank	Points	Rank
Jodie Cowie; Genevieve Randall	Duet	144.4326	10 Q	144.5659	12
Great Britain; Phoebe Bradley-Smith; Jorja Brown; Danielle Cooper; Jodie Cowie; Emma Critchley; Lara Hockin; Esme Lower; Genevieve Randall; Hannah Randall; Rebecca Richardson	Team	143.2716	10 Q	144.6049	9
Great Britain; Phoebe Bradley-Smith; Jorja Brown; Danielle Cooper; Jodie Cowie; Emma Critchley; Lara Hockin; Esme Lower; Genevieve Randall; Hannah Randall; Rebecca Richardson	Free Combination	74.9000	10 Q	75.9000	10

== Table Tennis ==
Based on the ITTF European rankings as at 1 March 2015, Great Britain secured three quotas for the Games.

Athlete	Event	Round 1	Round 2	Round 3	Quarterfinals	Semifinals	Final/BM	
Athlete	Event	Opposition Result	Opposition Result	Opposition Result	Opposition Result	Opposition Result	Opposition Result	Rank
Paul Drinkhall	Men's singles	Bye	Pattantyús (HUN); W 4–2	Tokic (SLO); W 4–2	Freitas (POR); W 4–1	Ovtcharov (GER); L 2–4	Kou (UKR); L 4–2	4
Liam Pitchford	Men's singles	Bye	Duranspahic (BIH); W 4–2	Wang (SVK); W 4–2	Kou (UKR); L 4–1	Did not progress		5
Kelly Sibley	Women's singles	Paškauskienė (LTU); L 4–2	did not advance					33

== Taekwondo ==
Based on the WTF rankings as at 31 March 2015, Great Britain secured seven quotas for the Games. Ruebyn Richards was originally selected for the men's 68 kg class, but was replaced by Martin Stamper.

Athlete	Event	Round of 16	Quarterfinals	Semifinals	Repechage	Bronze medal	Final	
Athlete	Event	Opposition Result	Opposition Result	Opposition Result	Opposition Result	Opposition Result	Opposition Result	Rank
Max Cater	Men's −58 kg	Chellamootoo (FRA); W 7–4	Ketbi (BEL); L 13–3	Did not advance				=9
Martin Stamper	Men's −68 kg	Gigrc (CRO); W 18–13	Denisenko (RUS); L 18–6	Did not advance				=9
Lutalo Muhammad	Men's −80 kg	Fejzić (SRB); W 8–7	Harchegani (AZE); L 16–4	Did not advance	Georgiev (BUL); W 16–4	Botto (ITA); W 12–7	Did not advance	3rd place, bronze medalist(s)
Mahama Cho	Men's +80 kg	Gkoltsios (GRE); L 5–10	did not advance					=13
Charlie Maddock	Women's 49 kg	Romoldanova (UKR); W 8–7 GP	Nicoli (ITA); W 17–3	Gonda (HUN); W 4–1	BYE	BYE	Bogdanovic (SRB); W 9–8 GP	1st place, gold medalist(s)
Jade Jones	Women's 57 kg	Pilivaki (CYP); W 9–1	Kotsis (HUN); W 5–2	Gladnovic (SWE); W 7–6	BYE	BYE	Zaninovic (CRO); W 12–9	1st place, gold medalist(s)
Bianca Walkden	Women's +67 kg	Aydin (TUR); W 9–6 GP	Konieva (UKR); L 13–14 GP	Did not advance				=9

GP = Golden Point

== Triathlon ==
Great Britain qualified for one quota place in both the men's and women's events by results in the European Triathlon Championships. Further quota places were won through end of year rankings. As a result, Great Britain had a full quota of places at Baku 2015.

Gordon Benson won Great Britain's first European Games medal, and first gold, in the men's race. In doing so, he guaranteed a quota place in men's triathlon for the 2016 Summer Olympics.

Athlete	Event	Swim (1.5 km)	Trans 1	Bike (40 km)	Trans 2	Run (10 km)	Total time	Rank
Gordon Benson	Men's triathlon	19:17	0:45	56:05	0:26	31:58	1:48:31	1st place, gold medalist(s)
Tom Bishop	Men's triathlon	18:48	0:48	56:34	0:31	34:19	1:51:00	16
Philip Graves	Men's triathlon	19:33	0:47	55:49	0:26	47:11	2:03:46	46
Heather Sellers	Women's triathlon	21:56	0:49	1:05:12	0:29	37:01	2:05:27	15

== Volleyball ==
Based on the rankings on 1 January 2015, Great Britain secured a single quota place in men's beach volleyball.

=== Beach ===
Athlete	Event	Preliminary round				Quarterfinals	Semifinals	Final	Rank
Athlete	Event	Pool Match 1	Pool Match 2	Pool Match 3	Standing	Quarterfinals	Semifinals	Final	Rank
Chris Gregory; Jake Sheaf	Men's	(Austria); Winter & Petutschnig; L 0 – 2	(Spain); Marco & Garcia; L 0 – 2	(Estonia); Kollo & Vesik; L 0 – 2	4	Did not advance			13

== Water Polo ==
Great Britain's U17 Women's Water Polo team secured qualification for the games at a qualifier held in Nice, France, in March, 2015.

- Women's team – Dani Brazier, Isabelle Dean, Hannah Edwards, Sophie Jackson, Fleur Kennedy, Verity McCoy, Mhairi Nurthen, Lara Partridge, Hayley Price, Kathy Rogers, Grace Rowland, Lucy Shaw, Beth Ward

Pos	Team	Pld	W	D	L	GF	GA	GD	Pts	
1	Greece	5	4	0	1	78	29	+49	12	Qualification to Semifinals
2	Netherlands	5	4	0	1	86	34	+52	12	Qualification to Play-offs
3	Hungary	5	4	0	1	80	35	+45	12	Qualification to Play-offs
4	Germany	5	2	0	3	32	61	−29	6	
5	Great Britain	5	1	0	4	33	74	−41	3	
6	Israel	5	0	0	5	18	94	−76	0	

First match(es) will be played: 12 June 2015. Source: baku2015.com

=== Preliminary Matches ===
12 Jun 2015; 13:45	Game 3	Greece	20–2	Great Britain	Water Polo Arena, Baku

13 Jun 2015; 16:45	Game 5	Great Britain	8–10	Germany	Water Polo Arena, Baku

14 Jun 2015; 16:45	Game 8	Netherlands	19–6	Great Britain	Water Polo Arena, Baku

15 Jun 2015; 15:00	Game 10	Great Britain	13–9	Israel	Water Polo Arena, Baku

16 Jun 2015; 18:00	Game 15	Hungary	16–4	Great Britain	Water Polo Arena, Baku

=== 7th–12th Classification ===
==== Quarter-final ====
17 Jun 2015; 10:30	Game 1	Great Britain	3–11	Serbia	Water Polo Arena, Baku

==== 11th–12th ====
18 Jun 2015; 13:00	Game 1	Great Britain	10–5	Israel	Water Polo Arena, Baku

== Wrestling ==
Following the European Wrestling Championships held in April 2014, UWW informed the British Wrestling Association that they would receive 2 quota places.

Athlete	Event	Preliminary Round	Round of 16	Quarterfinals	Semifinals	Repechage	Bronze medal	Final	
Athlete	Event	Opposition Result	Opposition Result	Opposition Result	Opposition Result	Opposition Result	Opposition Result	Opposition Result	Rank
Chinu Xxx	Men's freestyle 125 kg	bye	Khotsianivskyi (UKR); L 0–10	Did not advance					=9
Yana Rattigan	Women's −48 kg	Kogut (UKR); L 1–4	Did not advance						17
