= Diving at the 2015 European Games – Men's 1 metre springboard =

Men's 1 metre springboard at the 2015 European Games
- Venue: Baku Aquatics Centre
- Dates: 18 June
- Competitors: 30 from 20 nations
- Winning points: 543.80

Medalists
gold medal	Nikita Shleikher	Russia
silver medal	Ilia Molchanov	Russia
bronze medal	James Heatly	Great Britain

The men's 1 metre springboard diving competition at the 2015 European Games in Baku took place on 18 June at the Baku Aquatics Centre.

== Results ==
The preliminary round was started at 09:00. The final was held at 19:00.

Green denotes finalists

Rank	Diver	Nationality	Preliminary		Final	
Rank	Diver	Nationality	Points	Rank	Points	Rank
1st place, gold medalist(s)	Nikita Shleikher	Russia	507.50	2	543.80	1
2nd place, silver medalist(s)	Ilia Molchanov	Russia	534.80	1	512.20	2
3rd place, bronze medalist(s)	James Heatly	Great Britain	481.50	4	483.40	3
4	Frithjof Seidel	Germany	412.50	12	473.15	4
5	Andreas Larsen	Denmark	456.40	7	468.45	5
6	Jonathan Suckow	Switzerland	472.45	5	463.90	6
7	Adriano Ruslan Cristofori	Italy	486.95	3	459.75	7
8	Artyom Danilov	Azerbaijan	427.70	11	455.15	8
9	Jordan Houlden	Great Britain	451.85	9	453.15	9
10	Nico Herzog	Germany	464.45	6	450.10	10
11	Andrea Cosoli	Italy	455.60	8	431.95	11
12	Juraj Melša	Croatia	436.35	10	430.95	12
13	Juho Junttila	Finland	409.25	13	Did not advance	
14	Timothé Deneuville	France	398.15	14	Did not advance	
15	Dimitrios Molvalis	Greece	395.55	15	Did not advance	
16	Yury Naurozau	Belarus	390.55	16	Did not advance	
17	Nikita Kryvopyshyn	Ukraine	377.30	17	Did not advance	
18	Jan Wermelinger	Switzerland	374.80	18	Did not advance	
19	Hrvoje Brezovac	Croatia	373.90	19	Did not advance	
20	Ábel Ligárt	Hungary	368.15	20	Did not advance	
21	Alexis Jandard	France	366.00	21	Did not advance	
22	Alexander Mario Hart	Austria	356.45	22	Did not advance	
23	Bogomil Koynashki	Bulgaria	356.00	23	Did not advance	
24	Konstantinos Koutsioumpis	Greece	355.60	24	Did not advance	
25	Vitalii Levchenko	Ukraine	334.70	25	Did not advance	
26	Martynas Pabalys	Lithuania	330.75	26	Did not advance	
27	Ian-Soren Cabioch	Monaco	328.55	27	Did not advance	
28	Mihailo Ćurić	Serbia	325.65	28	Did not advance	
29	Moritz Pail	Austria	315.95	29	Did not advance	
30	Georgs Peskiševs	Latvia	300.85	30	Did not advance	
