= Swimming at the 2015 European Games – Men's 100 metre freestyle =

Men's 100 metre freestyle at the 2015 European Games
- Venue: Aquatic Palace
- Dates: 24–25 June
- Competitors: 64 from 29 nations
- Winning time: 49.43

Medalists
gold medal	Duncan Scott	Great Britain
silver medal	Alessandro Miressi	Italy
bronze medal	Vladislav Kozlov	Russia

The men's 100 metre freestyle event at the 2015 European Games in Baku took place on 24 and 25 June.

== Results ==
=== Heats ===
The heats were started on 24 June at 09:30.

Rank	Heat	Lane	Name	Nationality	Time	Notes
1	7	4	Duncan Scott	Great Britain	50.24	Q
2	6	6	Andrej Barna	Serbia	50.50	Q
3	6	4	Alessandro Bori	Italy	50.60	Q
4	6	5	Ziv Kalontarov	Israel	50.69	Q
5	5	4	Sergii Shevtsov	Ukraine	50.81	Q
6	6	1	Hüseyin Emre Sakçı	Turkey	50.85	Q
7	5	5	Alessandro Miressi	Italy	50.86	Q
8	7	8	Konstantin Walter	Germany	50.90	Q
9	7	3	Aleksei Brianskii	Russia	50.91	Q
10	7	5	Giovanni Izzo	Italy	50.93	
10	7	6	Vladislav Kozlov	Russia	50.93	Q
12	5	7	Marek Ulrich	Germany	50.93	Q
13	2	4	Viacheslav Ohnov	Ukraine	51.05	Q
13	5	3	Daniel Forndal	Sweden	51.05	Q
15	7	7	Martyn Walton	Great Britain	51.06	Q
16	6	3	Ivano Vendramme	Italy	51.11	
16	7	2	Georg Gutmann	Russia	51.11	
18	6	2	Josef Moser	Czech Republic	51.20	Q
19	4	7	Bruno Blašković	Croatia	51.29	QSO
19	5	6	Alexis Borisavljevic	Belgium	51.29	QSO
21	5	2	Marius Solaat Rødland	Norway	51.32	
22	5	1	Thomas Thijs	Belgium	51.34	
23	4	5	Mark Shperkin	Israel	51.40	
24	7	1	Vladyslav Perepelytsia	Ukraine	51.41	
25	4	3	Ármin Reményi	Hungary	51.47	
25	5	8	Michał Brzuś	Poland	51.47	
27	3	5	Juliusz Gosieniecki	Poland	51.49	
28	7	0	Alexander Lohmar	Germany	51.55	
29	6	9	Vladimír Štefánik	Slovakia	51.57	
30	4	6	Maximilian Forstenhäusler	Germany	51.59	
31	4	4	Valentin Borisavljevic	Belgium	51.64	
32	4	2	Ivan Denysenko	Ukraine	51.71	
33	3	7	Nikola Miljenić	Croatia	51.85	
33	5	0	Paweł Sendyk	Poland	51.85	
35	3	6	Oszkár Lavotha	Hungary	51.89	
36	3	4	Cevin Siim	Estonia	51.91	
37	6	7	Sergei Sudakov	Russia	51.92	
38	3	0	Philip Greve	Denmark	51.94	
39	1	4	Robin Grünberger	Austria	51.97	
40	3	2	Filip Grimberg	Sweden	52.02	
40	6	8	Cameron Kurle	Great Britain	52.02	
42	4	8	Manuel Leuthard	Switzerland	52.03	
43	3	3	Dries Vangoetsenhoven	Belgium	52.06	
44	1	2	Nikita Tsernosev	Estonia	52.14	
44	5	9	Olivier Petignat	Switzerland	52.14	
46	4	0	Sigurd Holten Bøen	Norway	52.33	
46	7	9	Matija Pucarević	Serbia	52.33	
48	4	1	Gabriel Sonoc	Romania	52.36	
49	2	5	Nikita Saunonen	Finland	52.50	
50	4	9	Hryhory Pekarski	Belarus	52.94	
51	2	2	Adi Mešetović	Bosnia and Herzegovina	53.17	
52	3	1	Meiron Cheruti	Israel	53.22	
53	3	9	Andrea Mozzini Vellen	Switzerland	53.24	
54	2	3	Takis Papadopoulos	Cyprus	53.48	
55	2	6	Ole-Mikal Fløgstad	Norway	53.66	
56	2	8	Daniel Aizenberg	Israel	24.32	
57	6	0	Daniel Speers	Great Britain	53.93	
58	2	7	Giorgi Biganishvili	Georgia	53.94	
59	1	6	Maid Sukanović	Bosnia and Herzegovina	54.01	
60	2	0	Juderi Bitchikashvili	Georgia	54.17	
61	2	1	Dorian Fazekas	Azerbaijan	24.76	
62	2	9	Eric Fernández Malvar	Andorra	55.58	
63	1	5	Kamran Jafrov	Azerbaijan	57.43	
64	1	3	Laurit Muja	Kosovo	1:03.68	
	3	8	Jakub Książek	Poland	DNS	

=== Swim-off ===
The swim-off was held on 24 June at 11:13.

Rank	Lane	Name	Nationality	Time	Notes
1	5	Alexis Borisavljevic	Belgium	50.59	Q
2	4	Bruno Blašković	Croatia	50.80	

=== Semifinals ===
The semifinals were started on 24 June at 17:42.

==== Semifinal 1 ====
Rank	Lane	Name	Nationality	Time	Notes
1	2	Vladislav Kozlov	Russia	50.33	Q
2	4	Andrej Barna	Serbia	50.54	Q
3	5	Ziv Kalontarov	Israel	50.61	q
4	3	Hüseyin Emre Sakçı	Turkey	50.74	
5	7	Viacheslav Ohnov	Ukraine	51.03	
6	6	Konstantin Walter	Germany	51.06	
7	5	Alexis Borisavljevic	Belgium	51.15	
8	1	Martyn Walton	Great Britain	53.21	

==== Semifinal 2 ====
Rank	Lane	Name	Nationality	Time	Notes
1	6	Alessandro Miressi	Italy	49.80	Q
2	4	Duncan Scott	Great Britain	49.81	Q
3	5	Alessandro Bori	Italy	50.04	q
4	3	Sergii Shevtsov	Ukraine	50.54	q
5	2	Aleksei Brianskii	Russia	50.70	q
6	8	Josef Moser	Czech Republic	51.09	
7	1	Daniel Forndal	Sweden	51.22	
8	7	Marek Ulrich	Germany	53.10	

=== Final ===
The final was held on 25 June at 18:15.

Rank	Lane	Name	Nationality	Time	Notes
1st place, gold medalist(s)	5	Duncan Scott	Great Britain	49.43	GR
2nd place, silver medalist(s)	4	Alessandro Miressi	Italy	50.03	
3rd place, bronze medalist(s)	6	Vladislav Kozlov	Russia	50.11	
4	8	Aleksei Brianskii	Russia	50.28	
5	7	Sergii Shevtsov	Ukraine	50.32	
6	1	Ziv Kalontarov	Israel	50.33	
7	3	Alessandro Bori	Italy	50.46	
8	2	Andrej Barna	Serbia	50.65	
