= Diving at the 2015 European Games – Men's 3 metre springboard =

2015 Springboard diving competition in European games

Men's 3 metre springboard at the 2015 European Games
- Venue: Baku Aquatics Centre
- Dates: 20 June
- Competitors: 32 from 19 nations
- Winning points: 541.65

Medalists
gold medal	James Heatly	Great Britain
silver medal	Adriano Ruslan Cristofori	Italy
bronze medal	Ilia Molchanov	Russia

The men's 3 metre springboard diving competition at the 2015 European Games in Baku took place on 20 June at the Baku Aquatics Centre.

== Results ==
The preliminary round was started at 10:00. The final was held at 20:25.

Green denotes finalists

Rank	Diver	Nationality	Preliminary		Final	
Rank	Diver	Nationality	Points	Rank	Points	Rank
1st place, gold medalist(s)	James Heatly	Great Britain	508.95	2	541.65	1
2nd place, silver medalist(s)	Adriano Ruslan Cristofori	Italy	481.00	5	523.30	2
3rd place, bronze medalist(s)	Ilia Molchanov	Russia	528.45	1	520.35	3
4	Jordan Houlden	Great Britain	473.90	9	511.90	4
5	Jonathan Suckow	Switzerland	467.15	12	505.60	5
6	Alexis Jandard	France	474.25	8	500.60	6
7	Andreas Larsen	Denmark	479.95	6	477.85	7
8	Cao-Tre Le Nguyen	Germany	499.25	4	475.55	8
9	Carlo Leuchte	Germany	467.65	11	463.70	9
10	Yury Naurozau	Belarus	500.60	3	458.50	10
11	Simon Rieckhoff	Switzerland	479.85	7	448.10	11
12	Gwendal Bisch	France	468.70	10	431.35	12
13	Martin Christensen	Denmark	464.90	13	did not advance	
14	Aleksandr Belevtsev	Russia	457.75	14	did not advance	
15	Juho Junttila	Finland	454.30	15	did not advance	
16	Juraj Melša	Croatia	450.80	16	did not advance	
17	Artyom Danilov	Azerbaijan	441.15	17	did not advance	
18	Francesco Porco	Italy	440.05	18	did not advance	
19	Bogomil Koynashki	Bulgaria	431.70	19	did not advance	
20	Mykyta Rudenko	Ukraine	425.40	20	did not advance	
21	Nikolaos Molvalis	Greece	422.00	21	did not advance	
22	Dimitar Isaev	Bulgaria	402.45	22	did not advance	
23	Juan Socorro	Spain	399.85	23	did not advance	
24	Vitalii Levchenko	Ukraine	395.60	24	did not advance	
25	Hrvoje Brezovac	Croatia	382.80	25	did not advance	
26	Artsiom Barouski	Belarus	376.15	26	did not advance	
27	Konstantinos Koutsioumpis	Greece	371.80	27	did not advance	
28	Moritz Pail	Austria	371.40	28	did not advance	
29	Alexander Mario Hart	Austria	367.80	29	did not advance	
30	Ábel Ligárt	Hungary	350.80	30	did not advance	
31	Ian-Soren Cabioch	Monaco	336.25	31	did not advance	
32	Georgs Peskiševs	Latvia	282.15	32	did not advance	
