= Swimming at the 2015 European Games – Women's 200 metre breaststroke =

Women's 200 metre breaststroke at the 2015 European Games
- Venue: Aquatic Palace
- Dates: 24–25 June
- Competitors: 32 from 21 nations
- Winning time: 2:23.06

Medalists
gold medal	Maria Astashkina	Russia
silver medal	Giulia Verona	Italy
bronze medal	Layla Black	Great Britain

The women's 200 metre breaststroke event at the 2015 European Games in Baku took place on 24 and 25 June at the Aquatic Palace.

== Results ==
=== Heats ===
The heats were started on 24 June at 10:29.

Rank	Heat	Lane	Name	Nationality	Time	Notes
1	4	4	Maria Astashkina	Russia	2:25.54	Q, GR
2	4	5	Layla Black	Great Britain	2:28.71	Q
3	4	3	Georgia Coates	Great Britain	2:28.75	Q
4	2	4	Daria Chikunova	Russia	2:28.94	Q
5	2	5	Abbie Wood	Great Britain	2:29.03	
6	3	5	Emma Cain	Great Britain	2:29.82	
7	3	4	Giulia Verona	Italy	2:30.28	Q
8	3	1	Ariel Braathen	Norway	2:32.66	Q
9	2	7	Annabelle Schwaiger	Austria	2:33.36	Q
10	2	6	Neža Klančar	Slovenia	2:34.23	Q
11	3	3	Lise Michels	Belgium	2:34.99	Q
12	3	2	Raquel Pereira	Portugal	2:35.51	Q
13	2	3	Sara Wallberg	Sweden	2:36.11	Q
14	3	6	Eleni Kontogeorgou	Greece	2:36.30	Q
15	1	5	Josefine Pedersen	Denmark	2:36.54	Q
16	4	6	Tara Vovk	Slovenia	2:36.67	Q
17	4	2	Sara Franceschi	Italy	2:36.68	Q
18	2	8	Essi-Maria Lillman	Finland	2:37.53	Q
19	3	8	Mona McSharry	Ireland	2:37.87	
20	4	7	Phillis Range	Germany	2:37.99	
21	2	1	Viktoryia Mikhalap	Belarus	2:38.00	
22	4	9	Mila Medić	Serbia	2:39.15	
23	2	2	Tetiana Kudako	Ukraine	2:39.24	
24	1	4	Zuzana Pavlikovská	Slovakia	2:39.25	
25	3	9	Zsófia Leitner	Hungary	2:39.55	
26	2	0	Sini Koivu	Finland	2:39.66	
27	3	0	Yuliya Gnidenko	Ukraine	2:40.22	
28	4	0	Niamh Kilgallen	Ireland	2:41.17	
29	2	7	Alexandra Vinicenco	Moldova	2:42.03	
30	4	8	Marie Graf	Germany	2:42.20	
31	4	1	Moona Koski	Finland	2:43.23	
32	1	3	Ásbjørg Hjelm	LEN ( Faroe Islands)	2:50.90	

=== Semifinals ===
The semifinals were started on 24 June at 19:05.

==== Semifinal 1 ====
Rank	Lane	Name	Nationality	Time	Notes
1	4	Layla Black	Great Britain	2:27.09	Q
2	5	Daria Chikunova	Russia	2:28.01	Q
3	3	Ariel Braathen	Norway	2:32.82	q
4	6	Neža Klančar	Slovenia	2:33.11	q
5	2	Raquel Pereira	Portugal	2:34.64	q
6	1	Tara Vovk	Slovenia	2:34.80	
7	7	Eleni Kontogeorgou	Greece	2:35.74	
8	8	Essi-Maria Lillman	Finland	2:35.86	

==== Semifinal 2 ====
Rank	Lane	Name	Nationality	Time	Notes
1	4	Maria Astashkina	Russia	2:23.88	Q, GR
2	3	Giulia Verona	Italy	2:29.00	Q
3	5	Georgia Coates	Great Britain	2:30.41	q
4	2	Lise Michels	Belgium	2:35.25	
5	8	Sara Franceschi	Italy	2:35.73	
6	7	Sara Wallberg	Sweden	2:36.59	
7	1	Josefine Pedersen	Denmark	2:36.92	
	6	Annabelle Schwaiger	Austria	DSQ	

=== Final ===
The final was held on 25 June at 18:18.

Rank	Lane	Name	Nationality	Time	Notes
1st place, gold medalist(s)	4	Maria Astashkina	Russia	2:23.06	GR, WJR
2nd place, silver medalist(s)	6	Giulia Verona	Italy	2:25.91	
3rd place, bronze medalist(s)	5	Layla Black	Great Britain	2:27.61	
4	3	Daria Chikunova	Russia	2:28.50	
5	2	Georgia Coates	Great Britain	2:29.93	
6	1	Neža Klančar	Slovenia	2:34.65	
7	7	Ariel Braathen	Norway	2:34.71	
8	8	Raquel Pereira	Portugal	2:34.99	
