= Swimming at the 2015 European Games – Women's 100 metre butterfly =

Women's 100 metre butterfly at the 2015 European Games
- Venue: Aquatic Palace
- Dates: 25–26 June
- Competitors: 36 from 19 nations
- Winning time: 59.36

Medalists
gold medal	Polina Egorova	Russia
silver medal	Amelia Clynes	Great Britain
bronze medal	Ilektra Lebl	Denmark
bronze medal	Laura Stephens	Great Britain

The women's 100 metre butterfly event at the 2015 European Games in Baku took place on 25 and 26 June at the Aquatic Palace.

== Results ==
=== Heats ===
The heats were started on 25 June at 10:26.

Rank	Heat	Lane	Name	Nationality	Time	Notes
1	2	4	Polina Egorova	Russia	1:00.36	Q, GR
2	3	4	Carmen Balbuena	Spain	1:00.89	Q
3	4	4	Amelia Clynes	Great Britain	1:00.93	Q
4	2	5	Laura Stephens	Great Britain	1:01.09	Q
5	4	5	Alexandra Chesnokova	Russia	1:01.13	Q
6	2	3	Ilektra Lebl	Greece	1:01.18	Q
7	3	5	Jana Zinnecker	Germany	1:01.24	Q
8	3	3	Ilaria Cusinato	Italy	1:01.66	Q, WD
9	4	6	Caroline Hechenbichler	Austria	1:01.98	Q
10	4	7	Sohvi Nenonen	Finland	1:02.12	Q
11	3	7	Hanna Rosvall	Sweden	1:02.24	Q
12	4	2	Merete Toft Jensen	Denmark	1:02.30	Q
13	4	8	Edita Chrápavá	Czech Republic	1:02.33	Q
14	2	7	Trine Kjøngerskov	Denmark	1:02.43	Q
15	4	1	Emma Reid	Ireland	1:02.66	Q
16	2	2	Andrea Melendo	Spain	1:02.70	Q
17	3	9	Dominika Geržová	Czech Republic	1:02.76	Q
18	2	6	Boglárka Bonecz	Hungary	1:02.86	
19	2	1	Diana Naglič	Slovenia	1:02.90	
20	2	8	Kaja Balant Marin	Slovenia	1:03.00	
21	1	3	Blanka Bokros	Hungary	1:03.07	
22	3	2	Thea Brandauer	Germany	1:03.20	
23	3	6	Tania Quaglieri	Italy	1:03.36	
24	1	1	Yüksel Deniz Özkan	Turkey	1:03.59	
25	1	4	Bena Sarapaitė	Lithuania	1:03.73	
26	4	0	Barbora Janíčková	Czech Republic	1:03.81	
27	3	1	Marina Luperi	Italy	1:04.04	
28	2	0	Margaret Markvardt	Estonia	1:04.09	
29	3	8	Sezin Eligül	Turkey	1:04.12	
30	1	5	Eva Olsen	Denmark	1:04.22	
31	1	2	Alma Lumio	Finland	1:04.47	
32	4	9	Olivia Sindico	Switzerland	1:04.78	
33	2	9	Helena Rosendahl Bach	Denmark	1:05.03	
34	1	7	Nea-Amanda Heinola	Finland	1:05.45	
35	3	0	Izabela Milanez	Slovenia	1:05.52	
36	1	6	Alsu Bayramova	Azerbaijan	1:06.20	
	4	3	Holly Hibbott	Great Britain	DNS	

=== Semifinals ===
The semifinals were started on 25 June at 18:29.

==== Semifinal 1 ====
Rank	Lane	Name	Nationality	Time	Notes
1	4	Carmen Balbuena	Spain	1:00.36	Q
2	3	Ilektra Lebl	Greece	1:00.43	Q
3	5	Laura Stephens	Great Britain	1:00.77	q
4	6	Dominika Geržová	Czech Republic	1:02.29	
5	8	Andrea Melendo	Spain	1:02.31	
6	2	Sohvi Nenonen	Finland	1:02.44	
7	1	Trine Kjøngerskov	Denmark	1:03.08	
8	7	Merete Toft Jensen	Denmark	1:04.16	

==== Semifinal 2 ====
Rank	Lane	Name	Nationality	Time	Notes
1	4	Polina Egorova	Russia	59.67	Q, GR
2	5	Amelia Clynes	Great Britain	1:00.09	Q
3	3	Alexandra Chesnokova	Russia	1:00.63	q
4	6	Jana Zinnecker	Germany	1:01.05	q
5	7	Hanna Rosvall	Sweden	1:01.60	q
6	2	Caroline Hechenbichler	Austria	1:01.93	
7	8	Emma Reid	Ireland	1:01.97	
7	1	Edita Chrápavá	Czech Republic	1:02.22	

=== Final ===
The final was held on 26 June at 18:57.

Rank	Lane	Name	Nationality	Time	Notes
1st place, gold medalist(s)	4	Polina Egorova	Russia	59.36	GR
2nd place, silver medalist(s)	5	Amelia Clynes	Great Britain	1:00.12	
3rd place, bronze medalist(s)	6	Ilektra Lebl	Greece	1:00.54	
3rd place, bronze medalist(s)	7	Laura Stephens	Great Britain	1:00.54	
5	3	Carmen Balbuena	Spain	1:00.58	
6	1	Jana Zinnecker	Germany	1:00.60	
7	2	Alexandra Chesnokova	Russia	1:00.81	
8	8	Hanna Rosvall	Sweden	1:01.60	
