= Swimming at the 2015 European Games – Men's 200 metre backstroke =

Men's 200 metre backstroke at the 2015 European Games
- Venue: Aquatic Palace
- Dates: 25–26 June
- Competitors: 39 from 26 nations
- Winning time: 1:56.89

Medalists
gold medal	Luke Greenbank	Great Britain
silver medal	Mikita Tsmyh	Belarus
bronze medal	Roman Larin	Russia

The men's 200 metre backstroke event at the 2015 European Games in Baku took place on 25 and 26 June at the Aquatic Palace.

== Results ==
=== Heats ===
The heats were started on 25 June at 10:11.

Rank	Heat	Lane	Name	Nationality	Time	Notes
1	4	4	Luke Greenbank	Great Britain	1:59.06	Q, GR
2	4	5	Roman Larin	Russia	2:01.00	Q
3	3	5	Jacopo Bietti	Italy	2:01.03	Q
4	3	4	Joe Hulme	Great Britain	2:01.11	Q
5	3	3	Jakub Skierka	Poland	2:01.13	Q
6	2	2	Tomáš Franta	Czech Republic	2:01.64	Q
7	2	3	Petter Fredriksson	Sweden	2:02.08	Q
8	4	2	Bence Szucsik	Hungary	2:02.27	Q
9	2	4	Mikita Tsmyh	Belarus	2:02.69	Q
10	4	6	Luigi Paciolla	Italy	2:02.79	Q
11	4	3	Nikolaos Sofianidis	Greece	2:03.18	Q
12	2	8	Oskar Ericsson	Sweden	2:03.67	Q
13	2	7	Joe Litchfield	Great Britain	2:03.71	
14	2	5	Kirill Titov	Russia	2:04.03	Q
15	3	6	Christoffer Fredrikson	Finland	2:04.19	Q
16	3	7	Franz Müller	Germany	2:04.36	Q
17	2	0	Lorenzo Mora	Italy	2:04.49	
18	4	1	Dominik Varga	Hungary	2:04.85	Q
19	3	8	João Vital	Portugal	2:05.28	
20	4	9	Ole Braunschweig	Germany	2:05.40	
21	4	8	Rory McEvoy	Ireland	2:05.49	
22	3	2	Moritz Walaschewski	Germany	2:05.72	
23	3	1	Vito Vodenik	Slovenia	2:05.83	
24	3	0	Daniel Kaplan	Israel	2:06.27	
25	1	2	Andrei Gussev	Estonia	2:07.06	
26	4	0	Berk Özkul	Turkey	2:07.08	
27	2	1	Tomer Drori	Israel	2:07.27	
28	1	4	Max Mannes	Luxembourg	2:07.58	
29	2	6	Robert Glință	Romania	2:07.98	
30	1	5	Alexander Světlík	Slovakia	2:09.43	
31	1	7	Qriqoriy Kalminskiy	Azerbaijan	2:09.69	
32	3	9	Rasim Oğulcan Gör	Turkey	2:09.78	
33	1	8	Bragi Snær Hallsson	Iceland	2:10.31	
34	1	6	Timothy Schlatter	Switzerland	2:10.65	
35	1	3	Alan Corby	Ireland	2:10.94	
36	4	7	Lorenzo Glessi	Italy	2:11.91	
37	2	9	Denys Martyniuk	Ukraine	2:14.19	
38	1	0	Adrian Negru	Moldova	2:16.08	
39	1	1	Tarik Hoch	Liechtenstein	2:20.24	

=== Semifinals ===
The semifinals were started on 25 June at 18:00.

==== Semifinal 1 ====
Rank	Lane	Name	Nationality	Time	Notes
1	5	Joe Hulme	Great Britain	2:00.23	Q
2	4	Roman Larin	Russia	2:01.24	Q
3	6	Bence Szucsik	Hungary	2:01.31	q
4	3	Tomáš Franta	Czech Republic	2:02.36	
5	2	Luigi Paciolla	Italy	2:03.05	
6	1	Christoffer Fredrikson	Finland	2:03.27	
7	7	Oskar Ericsson	Sweden	2:03.34	
8	8	Dominik Varga	Hungary	2:05.05	

==== Semifinal 2 ====
Rank	Lane	Name	Nationality	Time	Notes
1	4	Luke Greenbank	Great Britain	1:57.53	Q, GR
2	3	Jakub Skierka	Poland	1:59.95	Q
3	2	Mikita Tsmyh	Belarus	2:00.90	q
4	6	Petter Fredriksson	Sweden	2:01.51	q
5	5	Jacopo Bietti	Italy	2:01.96	q
6	7	Nikolaos Sofianidis	Greece	2:02.54	
7	1	Kirill Titov	Russia	2:03.43	
8	8	Franz Müller	Germany	2:04.64	

=== Final ===
The final was held on 26 June at 18:29.

Rank	Lane	Name	Nationality	Time	Notes
1st place, gold medalist(s)	4	Luke Greenbank	Great Britain	1:56.89	GR, WJ
2nd place, silver medalist(s)	6	Mikita Tsmyh	Belarus	1:59.46	
3rd place, bronze medalist(s)	2	Roman Larin	Russia	1:59.60	
4	5	Jakub Skierka	Poland	1:59.78	
5	3	Joe Hulme	Great Britain	2:00.16	
6	1	Petter Fredriksson	Sweden	2:01.20	
7	8	Jacopo Bietti	Italy	2:01.33	
8	7	Bence Szucsik	Hungary	2:01.62	
