= Swimming at the 2015 European Games – Men's 200 metre individual medley =

Men's 200 metre individual medley at the 2015 European Games
- Venue: Aquatic Palace
- Dates: 24–25 June
- Competitors: 45 from 26 nations
- Winning time: 2:01.39

Medalists
gold medal	Sebastian Steffan	Austria
silver medal	Jarvis Parkinson	Great Britain
bronze medal	Martyn Walton	Great Britain

The men's 200 metre individual medley event at the 2015 European Games in Baku took place on 24 and 25 June at the Aquatic Palace.

== Results ==
=== Heats ===
The heats were started on 24 June at 10:46.

Rank	Heat	Lane	Name	Nationality	Time	Notes
1	3	3	Sebastian Steffan	Austria	2:01.75	Q, GR
2	3	2	Gabriel Lópes	Portugal	2:02.72	Q
3	5	6	Anton Chupkov	Russia	2:02.85	Q, WD
4	5	4	Lorenzo Glessi	Italy	2:03.53	Q
5	5	3	Dániel Sós	Hungary	2:03.58	Q
6	5	2	Théo Berry	France	2:03.59	Q
7	4	3	Martyn Walton	Great Britain	2:04.01	Q
8	3	5	Nikolay Sokolov	Russia	2:04.03	Q
9	5	7	Marek Osina	Czech Republic	2:04.16	Q
10	3	6	Karol Zbutowicz	Poland	2:04.42	Q
11	3	7	Paul Hentschel	Germany	2:04.44	Q
12	4	4	Jarvis Parkinson	Great Britain	2:04.62	Q
12	4	6	Igor Balyberdin	Russia	2:04.62	
14	4	2	Matteo Bertoldi	Italy	2:05.04	Q
15	3	4	Joan Casanovas	Spain	2:05.16	Q
16	5	8	Oskar Ericsson	Sweden	2:05.99	Q
17	4	7	Jacques Läuffer	Switzerland	2:06.37	Q
18	4	8	James Brown	Ireland	2:06.55	Q
19	2	7	Batuhan Hakan	Turkey	2:06.61	
20	3	8	Nico Perner	Germany	2:07.06	
21	5	5	Joe Hulme	Great Britain	2:07.09	
22	4	1	Petter Fredriksson	Sweden	2:07.19	
23	5	1	Ante Lučev	Croatia	2:07.36	
24	3	1	Maximilian Forstenhäusler	Germany	2:07.41	
25	4	9	Samet Alkan	Turkey	2:07.44	
26	5	9	Tobias Niestroy	Germany	2:07.98	
27	2	3	Benjamin Doyle	Ireland	2:08.10	
28	2	9	Paulius Grigaliūnas	Lithuania	2:08.41	
29	2	6	Pavel Bashura	Belarus	2:08.57	
30	3	0	Thomas Dal	Belgium	2:08.72	
31	2	2	João Vital	Portugal	2:08.74	
32	4	5	Giacomo Carini	Italy	2:08.78	
33	2	1	Silver Hein	Estonia	2:09.64	
34	3	9	Andrew Moore	Ireland	2:09.79	
35	1	5	Niko Mäkelä	Finland	2:10.12	
36	1	4	Wojciech Ulatowski	Poland	2:10.33	
37	4	0	Dawid Pietrzak	Poland	2:10.60	
38	2	5	Alan Corby	Ireland	2:10.75	
39	2	4	Tomer Drori	Israel	2:11.29	
40	1	6	Vlas Cononov	Moldova	2:11.31	
41	5	0	Illia Pidvalnyi	Ukraine	2:11.74	
42	2	0	Kaloyan Nikolov	Bulgaria	2:11.87	
43	2	8	Kyriacos Papa-Adams	Cyprus	2:11.94	
44	1	2	Adrian Negru	Moldova	2:13.12	
45	1	3	Karel Seli	Estonia	2:16.58	

=== Semifinals ===
The semifinals were started on 24 June at 18:04.

==== Semifinal 1 ====
Rank	Lane	Name	Nationality	Time	Notes
1	5	Dániel Sós	Hungary	2:02.65	Q
2	3	Martyn Walton	Great Britain	2:03.17	Q
3	6	Marek Osina	Czech Republic	2:03.33	q
4	4	Gabriel Lópes	Portugal	2:03.43	q
5	2	Paul Hentschel	Germany	2:04.58	
6	7	Matteo Bertoldi	Italy	2:05.48	
7	1	Oskar Ericsson	Sweden	2:05.72	
8	8	James Brown	Ireland	2:07.15	

==== Semifinal 2 ====
Rank	Lane	Name	Nationality	Time	Notes
1	4	Sebastian Steffan	Austria	2:01.92	Q
2	5	Lorenzo Glessi	Italy	2:02.23	Q
3	3	Théo Berry	France	2:02.58	q
4	7	Jarvis Parkinson	Great Britain	2:03.53	q
5	1	Joan Casanovas	Spain	2:03.84	
6	2	Karol Zbutowicz	Poland	2:03.95	
7	6	Nikolay Sokolov	Russia	2:04.27	
8	8	Jacques Läuffer	Switzerland	2:05.51	

=== Final ===
The final was held on 25 June at 18:45.

Rank	Lane	Name	Nationality	Time	Notes
1st place, gold medalist(s)	4	Sebastian Steffan	Austria	2:01.39	GR
2nd place, silver medalist(s)	8	Jarvis Parkinson	Great Britain	2:01.94	
3rd place, bronze medalist(s)	2	Martyn Walton	Great Britain	2:02.24	
4	6	Dániel Sós	Hungary	2:02.76	
5	5	Lorenzo Glessi	Italy	2:02.82	
6	3	Théo Berry	France	2:03.00	
7	1	Gabriel Lópes	Portugal	2:03.03	
8	7	Marek Osina	Czech Republic	2:04.57	
