= Swimming at the 2015 European Games – Men's 200 metre freestyle =

Men's 200 metre freestyle at the 2015 European Games
- Venue: Aquatic Palace
- Dates: 26–27 June
- Competitors: 53 from 25 nations
- Winning time: 1:48.55

Medalists
gold medal	Duncan Scott	Great Britain
silver medal	Cameron Kurle	Great Britain
bronze medal	Elisei Stepanov	Russia

The men's 200 metre freestyle event at the 2015 European Games in Baku took place on 26 and 27 June at the Aquatic Palace.

== Results ==
=== Heats ===
The heats were started on 25 June at 10:05.

Rank	Heat	Lane	Name	Nationality	Time	Notes
1	4	4	Elisei Stepanov	Russia	1:49.29	Q, GR
2	6	4	Duncan Scott	Great Britain	1:49.39	Q
3	6	5	Cameron Kurle	Great Britain	1:49.83	Q
4	6	7	Nikolay Snegirev	Russia	1:50.22	Q
5	5	4	Aleksandr Prokofev	Russia	1:50.27	
6	4	6	Marc Vivas	Spain	1:50.93	Q
7	4	5	Kyle Chisholm	Great Britain	1:51.18	
8	3	4	Erge Gezmis	Turkey	1:51.62	Q
9	6	8	Mateusz Arndt	Poland	1:51.73	Q
10	6	3	Sebastian Steffan	Austria	1:51.79	Q, WD
11	5	1	Valentin Borisavljevic	Belgium	1:51.83	Q
12	5	6	Guillem Pujol	Spain	1:51.92	Q
13	5	2	Thomas Thijs	Belgium	1:51.96	Q
14	5	5	Martyn Walton	Great Britain	1:51.99	
15	4	0	Filippo Megli	Italy	1:52.15	Q
16	6	1	Joan Casanovas	Spain	1:52.20	
17	6	6	Moritz Brandt	Germany	1:52.30	Q
18	4	2	Dimitrios Dimitriou	Greece	1:52.51	Q
19	5	7	Alexis Borisavljevic	Belgium	1:52.55	
20	2	5	Blaž Demšar	Slovenia	1:52.72	Q
21	5	3	Igor Shadrin	Russia	1:52.80	
22	4	1	Konstantin Walter	Germany	1:52.84	Q
23	4	3	Henning Mühlleitner	Germany	1:52.91	
24	3	1	Andrea Mozzini Vellen	Switzerland	1:52.99	Q
25	4	7	Alessio Proietti Colonna	Italy	1:53.24	
26	6	0	Ricardo Rosales	Spain	1:53.28	
27	4	9	Daniel Forndal	Sweden	1:53.58	
28	3	6	Matteo Cinquino	Italy	1:53.87	
29	3	3	Kaan Özcan	Turkey	1:53.92	
30	6	2	Alexander Trap	Belgium	1:54.36	
31	2	6	Cla Remund	Switzerland	1:54.42	
32	3	9	Armin Remenyi	Hungary	1:54.55	
33	5	9	Filip Grimberg	Sweden	1:54.65	
34	3	2	João Gil	Portugal	1:54.67	
35	4	8	Alexander Lohmar	Germany	1:54.71	
36	1	4	Igor Kostovski	Croatia	1:54.78	
37	3	8	Borna Jukić	Croatia	1:54.99	
38	5	8	Andrej Barna	Serbia	1:55.07	
39	2	4	Viacheslav Ohnov	Ukraine	1:55.09	
40	1	5	Filip Hodur	Poland	1:55.27	
41	3	5	Alessandro Miressi	Italy	1:55.51	
42	2	9	Juliusz Gosieniecki	Poland	1:55.87	
43	2	1	Manuel Leuthard	Switzerland	1:56.12	
43	3	0	Batuhan Hakan	Turkey	1:56.12	
45	5	0	Gustaf Dahlman	Sweden	1:57.14	
46	2	0	Gabriel Sonoc	Romania	1:57.18	
47	3	7	Sigurd Holten Bøen	Norway	1:57.34	
48	2	8	Max Mannes	Luxembourg	1:57.49	
49	2	2	Olivier Petignat	Switzerland	1:57.71	
50	1	7	Kyriacos Papa-Adams	Cyprus	1:58.79	
51	1	3	Marius Ihlen Gardshodn	LEN ( Faroe Islands)	1:59.41	
52	1	6	Georgia Biganishvili	Georgia	2:01.01	
53	1	2	Franc Aleksi	Albania	2:01.88	
	2	3	Ole-Mikal Fløgstad	Norway	DNS	
	2	7	Jakub Książek	Poland	DNS	
	6	9	Victor Johansson	Sweden	DNS	

=== Semifinals ===
The semifinals were started on 26 June at 18:11.

==== Semifinal 1 ====
Rank	Lane	Name	Nationality	Time	Notes
1	5	Nikolay Snegirev	Russia	1:49.57	Q
2	4	Duncan Scott	Great Britain	1:50.11	Q
3	3	Erge Gezmis	Turkey	1:51.63	
4	7	Moritz Brandt	Germany	1:51.89	
5	1	Blaž Demšar	Slovenia	1:52.80	
6	6	Valentin Borisavljevic	Belgium	1:52.90	
7	8	Andrea Mozzini Vellen	Switzerland	1:52.96	
8	2	Thomas Thijs	Belgium	1:54.29	

==== Semifinal 2 ====
Rank	Lane	Name	Nationality	Time	Notes
1	4	Elisei Stepanov	Russia	1:49.43	Q
2	5	Cameron Kurle	Great Britain	1:49.50	Q
3	3	Marc Vivas	Spain	1:50.55	q
4	6	Mateusz Arndt	Poland	1:51.13	q
5	1	Dimitrios Dimitriou	Greece	1:51.21	q
6	7	Filippo Megli	Italy	1:51.24	q
7	2	Guillem Pujol	Spain	1:51.74	
8	8	Konstantin Walter	Germany	1:52.02	

=== Final ===
The final was held on 27 June at 18:22.

Rank	Lane	Name	Nationality	Time	Notes
1st place, gold medalist(s)	4	Duncan Scott	Great Britain	1:48.55	GR
2nd place, silver medalist(s)	5	Cameron Kurle	Great Britain	1:48.92	
3rd place, bronze medalist(s)	8	Elisei Stepanov	Russia	1:49.64	
4	1	Nikolay Snegirev	Russia	1:49.83	
5	2	Filippo Megli	Italy	1:50.84	
6	3	Marc Vivas	Spain	1:51.03	
7	6	Dimitrios Dimitriou	Greece	1:51.39	
8	7	Mateusz Arndt	Poland	1:51.80	
