= Swimming at the 2015 European Games – Women's 400 metre individual medley =

Women's 400 metre individual medley at the 2015 European Games
- Venue: Aquatic Palace
- Dates: 23 June
- Competitors: 20 from 13 nations
- Winning time: 4:41.97

Medalists
gold medal	Abbie Wood	Great Britain
silver medal	Ilaria Cusinato	Italy
bronze medal	Anja Crevar	Serbia

The women's 400 metre individual medley competition at the 2015 European Games in Baku took place on 23 June at the Aquatic Palace.

== Results ==
=== Heats ===
The heats were started at 10:59.

Rank	Heat	Lane	Name	Nationality	Time	Notes
1	2	4	Abbie Wood	Great Britain	4:45.61	Q, GR
2	2	5	Ilaria Cusinato	Italy	4:46.84	Q
3	3	4	Georgia Coates	Great Britain	4:48.06	Q
4	3	5	Anja Crevar	Serbia	4:50.43	Q
5	2	7	Lotte Goris	Belgium	4:54.30	Q
6	3	3	Sara Franceschi	Italy	4:55.07	Q
7	2	2	Anna Pirovano	Italy	4:55.68	
8	2	1	Irina Krivonogova	Russia	4:55.99	Q
9	3	7	Laia Martí	Spain	4:56.50	Q
10	3	6	Marie Graf	Germany	4:56.80	
11	2	3	Rosa Maeso	Spain	5:00.87	
12	2	6	María Artigas	Spain	5:02.52	
13	1	3	Margaret Markvardt	Estonia	5:05.08	
14	1	4	Nea-Amanda Heinola	Finland	5:05.45	
15	2	8	Vasilisa Zeliankevich	Belarus	5:06.08	
16	2	0	Essi-Maria Lillman	Finland	5:06.10	
17	3	1	Madalena Azevedo	Portugal	5:07.14	
18	3	8	Maria Cabral	Portugal	5:08.32	
19	1	5	Katie Baguley	Ireland	5:15.60	
20	3	0	Tetiana Kudako	Ukraine	5:16.70	
	3	2	Dóra Sztankovics	Hungary	Did not start	

=== Final ===
The final was held at 17:43.

Rank	Lane	Name	Nationality	Time	Notes
1st place, gold medalist(s)	4	Abbie Wood	Great Britain	4:41.97	GR
2nd place, silver medalist(s)	5	Ilaria Cusinato	Italy	4:44.01	
3rd place, bronze medalist(s)	6	Anja Crevar	Serbia	4:45.84	
4	3	Georgia Coates	Great Britain	4:46.52	
5	7	Sara Franceschi	Italy	4:49.38	
6	1	Irina Krivonogova	Russia	4:54.09	
7	2	Lotte Goris	Belgium	4:54.48	
8	8	Laia Martí	Spain	4:56.59	
