= Diving at the 2015 European Games =

- Venue: Baku Aquatics Centre
- Dates: 18–21 June
- Competitors: 114 from 29 nations

The Diving events at the 2015 European Games took place at the Baku Aquatics Centre, Baku from 18 to 21 June 2015. Eight events were contested, six from the Olympic program, 3 metre and 3 metre synchronised springboard, and platform for both men and women. In addition, two non-Olympic events, men's and women's 1m springboard, were held. The Olympic events of men's and women's 10 metre synchronised diving were not held.

Diving was not included in the earliest list of sports confirmed for the 2015 Games, as the European swimming authorities at that stage were minded not to take part. However, following negotiations with the organising authorities, a compromise was reached whereby, in 2015, these events were for junior divers only - in effect, athletes between the ages of 14 and 18.

== Qualification ==
160 divers are expected to take part. National Olympic Committees will be restricted to one entry in each synchronised event, and two entries in each individual event. As host, Azerbaijan is entitled to a minimum one diver.

Following the European Junior Diving Championships in July 2014 (Bergamo, Italy), LEN will confirm the quotas per nation and based on an average ranking by NOC from the last three European Junior Diving Championships.

== Timetable ==
| OC | Opening ceremony | T | Training day | ● | Event competitions | 1 | Event finals | CC | Closing ceremony |

| June | 12th Fri | 13th Sat | 14th Sun | 15th Mon | 16th Tue | 17th Wed | 18th Thu | 19th Fri | 20th Sat | 21st Sun | 22nd Mon | 23rd Tue | 24th Wed | 25th Thu | 26th Fri | 27th Sat | 28th Sun | Events |
|---|---|---|---|---|---|---|---|---|---|---|---|---|---|---|---|---|---|---|
| Diving | OC | | | | | | 2 | 2 | 2 | 2 | | | | | | | CC | 8 |

== Participating Countries ==
The number beside each nation represents the number of athletes who will compete for each country at the 2015 European Games.

- Austria (4)
- Azerbaijan (2)
- Belarus (5)
- Bulgaria (2)
- Croatia (4)
- Denmark (2)
- Finland (4)
- France (6)
- Georgia (1)
- Germany (9)
- Great Britain (11)
- Greece (3)
- Hungary (2)
- Ireland (1)
- Italy (8)
- Latvia (2)
- Lithuania (3)
- Monaco (1)
- Netherlands (4)
- Norway (2)
- Poland (5)
- Romania (4)
- Russia (10)
- Serbia (1)
- Spain (1)
- Switzerland (6)
- Sweden (2)
- Turkey (1)
- Ukraine (8)

== Medal table ==
| Rank | Nation | Gold | Silver | Bronze | Total |
|---|---|---|---|---|---|
| 1 | Great Britain | 4 | 1 | 1 | 6 |
| 2 | Russia | 3 | 5 | 1 | 9 |
| 3 | Germany | 1 | 1 | 3 | 5 |
| 4 | Italy | 0 | 1 | 0 | 1 |
| 5 | Ukraine | 0 | 0 | 2 | 2 |
| 6 | France | 0 | 0 | 1 | 1 |
| Totals (6 entries) | | 8 | 8 | 8 | 24 |

== Medalists ==
=== Men's ===
| Event | Gold | Silver | Bronze |
|---|---|---|---|
| 1 metre springboard | Nikita Shleikher; Russia | Ilia Molchanov; Russia | James Heatly; Great Britain |
| 3 metre springboard | James Heatly; Great Britain | Adriano Ruslan Cristofori; Italy | Ilia Molchanov; Russia |
| 3 metre synchronized springboard | Russia; Ilia Molchanov; Nikita Nikolaev | Great Britain; Ross Haslam; James Heatly | Germany; Nico Herzog; Frithjof Seidel |
| 10 m platform | Matty Lee; Great Britain | Nikita Shleikher; Russia | Alexis Jandard; France |

=== Women's ===
| Event | Gold | Silver | Bronze |
|---|---|---|---|
| 1 metre springboard | Maria Polyakova; Russia | Louisa Stawczynski; Germany | Diana Shelestyuk; Ukraine |
| 3 metre springboard | Katherine Torrance; Great Britain | Ekaterina Nekrasova; Russia | Saskia Oettinghaus; Germany |
| 3 metre synchronized springboard | Germany; Saskia Oettinghaus; Louisa Stawczynski | Russia; Elena Chernykh; Maria Polyakova | Ukraine; Marharyta Dzhusova; Diana Shelestyuk |
| 10 m platform | Lois Toulson; Great Britain | Anna Chuinyshena; Russia | Elena Wassen; Germany |
