= Diving at the 2015 European Games – Men's synchronized 3 metre springboard =

Men's synchronized 3 metre springboard at the 2015 European Games
- Venue: Baku Aquatics Centre
- Dates: 19 June
- Competitors: 22 from 11 nations
- Teams: 11
- Winning points: 324.69

Medalists
| gold medal | Ilia Molchanov; Nikita Nikolaev | Russia |
| silver medal | Ross Haslam; James Heatly | Great Britain |
| bronze medal | Nico Herzog; Frithjof Seidel | Germany |

The men's synchronized 3 metre springboard diving competition at the 2015 European Games in Baku took place on 19 June at the Baku Aquatics Centre.

== Results ==
The final was held at 19:00.

| Rank | Diver | Nationality | Points |
|---|---|---|---|
| 1st place, gold medalist(s) | Ilia Molchanov; Nikita Nikolaev | Russia | 324.69 |
| 2nd place, silver medalist(s) | Ross Haslam; James Heatly | Great Britain | 286.05 |
| 3rd place, bronze medalist(s) | Nico Herzog; Frithjof Seidel | Germany | 284.22 |
| 4 | Hrvoje Brezovac; Juraj Melša | Croatia | 263.10 |
| 5 | Fabian Stepinski; Jan Wermelinger | Switzerland | 262.92 |
| 6 | Dimitar Isaev; Bogomil Koynashki | Bulgaria | 260.91 |
| 7 | Nikita Kryvopyshyn; Vitalii Levchenko | Ukraine | 255.78 |
| 8 | Andrea Cocoli; Francesco Porco | Italy | 255.39 |
| 9 | Martin Christensen; Andreas Larsen | Denmark | 245.10 |
| 10 | Dimitrios Molvalis; Nikolaos Molvalis | Greece | 237.75 |
| 11 | Alexander Mario Hart; Moritz Pail | Austria | 230.61 |
