= Vladimír Štefánik =

Slovak swimmer

Personal information
- Born: 8 January 1998 (age 28)

Sport
- Sport: Swimming

Vladimír Štefánik (born 8 January 1998) is a Slovak swimmer. In 2019, he represented Slovakia at the 2019 World Aquatics Championships held in Gwangju, South Korea and he finished in 52nd place in the heats in the men's 50 metre freestyle event. In the men's 100 metre freestyle he finished in 49th place in the heats.

In 2015, he competed in the men's 100 metre freestyle event at the 2015 European Games held in Baku, Azerbaijan.
