= Fencing at the 2015 European Games – Men's team foil =

Men's team foil at the 2015 European Games
- Venue: Crystal Hall 3
- Date: 27 June
- Competitors: 24 from 6 nations

Medalists
gold medal	Richard Kruse; Marcus Mepstead; Benjamin Peggs; Alex Tofalides	Great Britain
silver medal	Alessio Foconi; Francesco Ingargiola; Lorenzo Nista; Damiano Rosatelli	Italy
bronze medal	Timur Arslanov; Aleksey Khovanskiy; Timur Safin; Dmitry Zherebchenko	Russia

The men's team foil competition at the 2015 European Games in Baku was held on 27 June at the Crystal Hall 3.

== Results ==
Quarterfinals
Great Britain	45
Germany	26
Italy	45
Poland	30

Semifinals
France	41
Great Britain	45
Italy	45
Russia	42

Final
Great Britain	45
Italy	41
Third place
France	33
Russia	45

Fifth place
Germany	45
Poland	24

== Final standing ==
Rank	Team
1st place, gold medalist(s)	Great Britain; Richard Kruse; Marcus Mepstead; Benjamin Peggs; Alex Tofalides
2nd place, silver medalist(s)	Italy; Alessio Foconi; Francesco Ingargiola; Lorenzo Nista; Damiano Rosatelli
3rd place, bronze medalist(s)	Russia; Timur Arslanov; Aleksey Khovanskiy; Timur Safin; Dmitry Zherebchenko
4	France; Baptiste Mourrain; Maxime Pauty; Vincent Simon; Jean-Paul Tony Helissey
5	Germany; Georg Dörr; Alexander Kahl; Mark Perelmann; Niklas Uftring
6	Poland; Michał Janda; Paweł Kawiecki; Leszek Rajski; Jakub Surwiłło
