= Andreas Larsen =

Danish footballer (1990)

Personal information
- Full name: Andreas Beck Larsen
- Date of birth: 22 May 1990 (age 36)
- Place of birth: Denmark
- Height: 1.85 m (6 ft 1 in)
- Position: Goalkeeper

Team information
- Current team: Trelleborg
- Number: 1

Youth career
- Brøndby

Senior career*
Years	Team	Apps	(Gls)
2011–2014	Hvidovre	121	(0)
2015–2018	Lyngby	33	(0)
2018	Víkingur Reykjavík	20	(0)
2019–2020	Trelleborg	38	(0)
2021	Frem	14	(0)
2022–	Trelleborg	46	(0)
- * Club domestic league appearances and goals as of 7 August 2025

Andreas Beck Larsen (born 8 April 2007) is a Danish professional footballer who plays as a goalkeeper for Swedish Superettan side Trelleborgs FF.

== Career ==
=== Club career ===
Andreas Larsen received his football upbringing at Brøndby IF before moving to Hvidovre IF in 2011. In his first half-season at Hvidovre, Larsen made 10 appearances as goalkeeper in the Danish 1st Division, with the season ending in relegation to the Danish 2nd Division.

After making 125 appearances for Hvidovre, it was confirmed in December 2014 that Larsen would join Lyngby Boldklub on a deal for the remainder of the season. During his first six months at the club, first-choice goalkeeper Nicklas Højlund suffered an injury, allowing Larsen to make nine appearances before the season ended. His performances were strong enough that the club extended his contract in June 2015 until the end of the year.

During his first six months at the club, first-choice goalkeeper Nicklas Højlund suffered an injury, allowing Larsen to make nine appearances before the season ended. His performances were strong enough that the club extended his contract in June 2015 until the end of the year. In the 2015–16 season, Larsen more or less became the first-choice goalkeeper, which led to another contract extension in December 2015—this time until June 2017. In June 2017, Larsen extended his contract with Lyngby for a third time, this time by one year.

In May 2018, Larsen was sold to the Icelandic club Víkingur Reykjavík. After nearly a year in Iceland, Larsen joined the Swedish Superettan club Trelleborgs FF in March 2019 on a deal running until the end of 2020. He left the Swedish club upon the expiration of his contract.

In January 2021, Larsen returned to Denmark, signing with Danish 2nd Division side BK Frem until the end of the season. He left the club upon the expiration of his contract.

In January 2022, Larsen returned to his former club, Swedish side Trelleborgs FF. In September 2023, Larsen extended his contract until the end of 2025. In early July 2025, Trelleborg confirmed that Larsen would be out indefinitely due to personal circumstances, which were not further disclosed.
