= Nicklas Højlund =

Danish footballer (born 1990)

Personal information
- Full name: Nicklas Højlund
- Date of birth: 6 March 1990 (age 36)
- Place of birth: Copenhagen, Denmark
- Position: Goalkeeper

Senior career*
Years	Team	Apps	(Gls)
2008–2015	Lyngby BK	93	(0)
- * Club domestic league appearances and goals as of 9 July 2015

Nicklas Højlund (born 6 March 1990) is a Danish footballer who last played for Lyngby BK.
