= James Heatly =

Scottish and British diver

James Heatly OLY
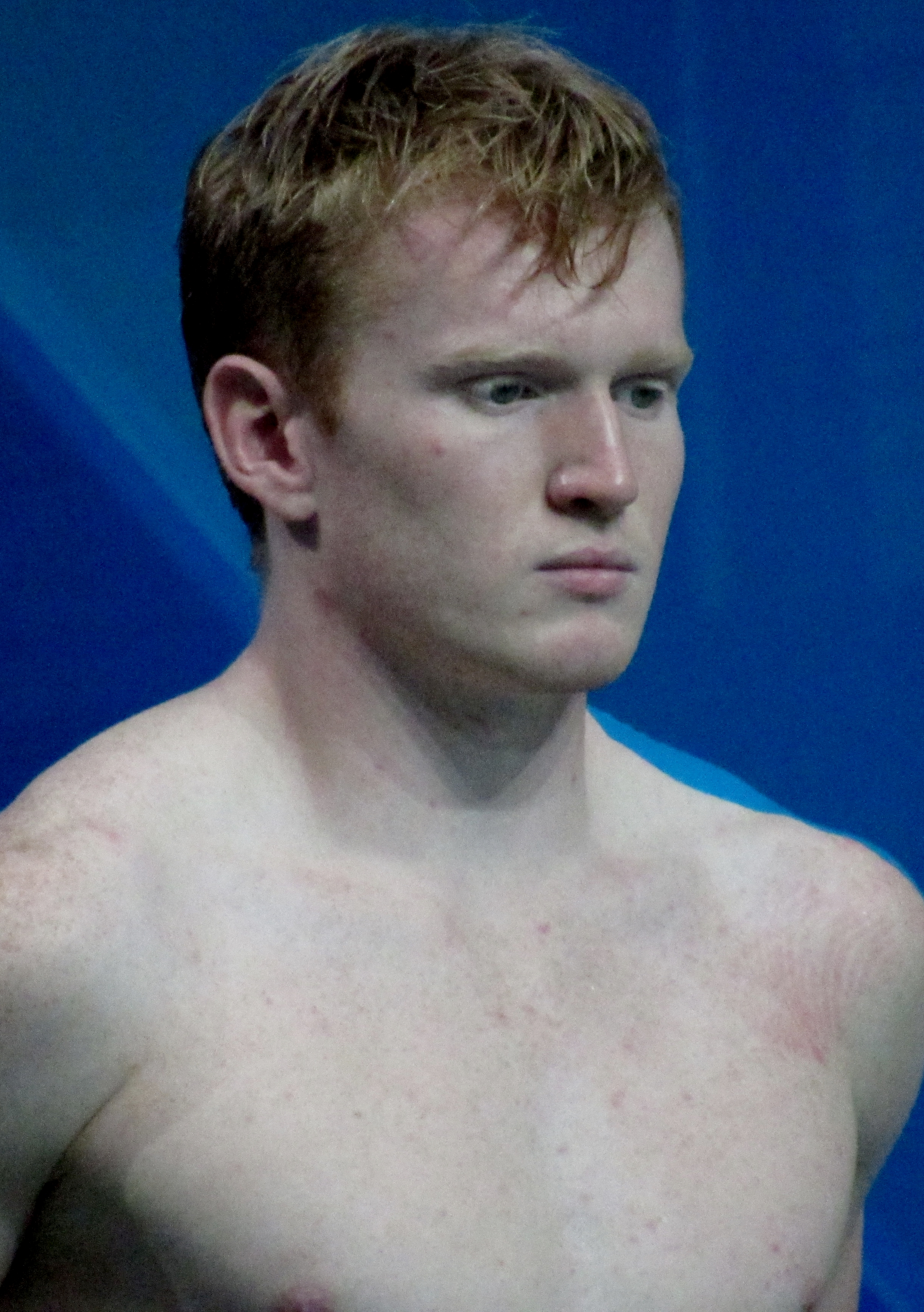
- Heatly in 2019

Personal information
- Full name: James Philip Heatly
- Born: 20 May 1997 (age 29) Winchester, Hampshire, England
- Height: 1.71 m (5 ft 7 in)

Sport
- Country: Great Britain
- Sport: Diving
- Events: 1 metre, 3 metres & 10 metres synchro
- Club: Edinburgh Diving
Medal record
Men's diving
Representing Great Britain
World Championships
Bronze medal – third place	2022 Budapest	Team event
Bronze medal – third place	2022 Budapest	3 m mixed synchro
European Championships
Silver medal – second place	2022 Rome	3 m mixed synchro
Bronze medal – third place	2018 Glasgow	1 m springboard
Bronze medal – third place	2022 Rome	Team event
European Games
Gold medal – first place	2015 Baku	3 m springboard
Silver medal – second place	2023 Kraków-Małopolska	3 m mixed synchro
Silver medal – second place	2015 Baku	3 m synchro
Bronze medal – third place	2015 Baku	1 m springboard
European Diving Championships
Silver medal – second place	2023 Rzeszów	3 m mixed synchro
FINA Diving World Cup
Silver medal – second place	2021 Tokyo	3 m springboard
Representing Scotland
Commonwealth Games
Gold medal – first place	2022 Birmingham	3 m mixed synchro
Bronze medal – third place	2018 Gold Coast	1 m springboard

James Philip Heatly OLY (born 20 May 1997) is a British diver.

== Career ==
In 2015, at the inaugural European Games held in Baku where the diving events are for juniors only, he won a gold in the 3 metre springboard, a bronze in the 1 metre springboard, as well as a silver in the men's synchronised 3 metre springboard with Ross Haslam.

At the 2018 Commonwealth Games he won bronze in the 1m springboard event, becoming only the second Scottish diver to win a diving medal after his grandfather Sir Peter Heatly won gold in 1958.

At the 2018 European Championships in Glasgow/Edinburgh, Heatly won a bronze in the men's 1 metre springboard.

At the 2019 European Diving Championships held in Kyiv, Heatly won bronze in the Men's 3m springboard.

At the 2021 FINA Diving World Cup held in Japan as an official test event for the 2020 Tokyo Olympics, Heatly won silver in the Men's 3m springboard event.

At the 2022 World Aquatics Championships, Heatly won his first World Championship medals, a bronze in the Mixed 3m & 10m team event with Andrea Spendolini-Sirieix, followed on the same day by a bronze in the mixed 3 metre synchro event with Grace Reid

He represented Scotland at the 2022 Commonwealth Games where he won a gold medal in the Mixed synchronised 3 metre springboard event alongside Grace Reid. and came 4th in the Men's 1 metre springboard and Men's 3 metre springboard events.

In May 2023, he won his third 3m synchro title at the British Diving Championships.

== Media ==
James Heatly appeared in a short film "The Bath House" in 2009.

== Personal life ==
Heatly is the grandson of fellow international diver Peter Heatly.
