= Frithjof Seidel =

German diver (born 1997)

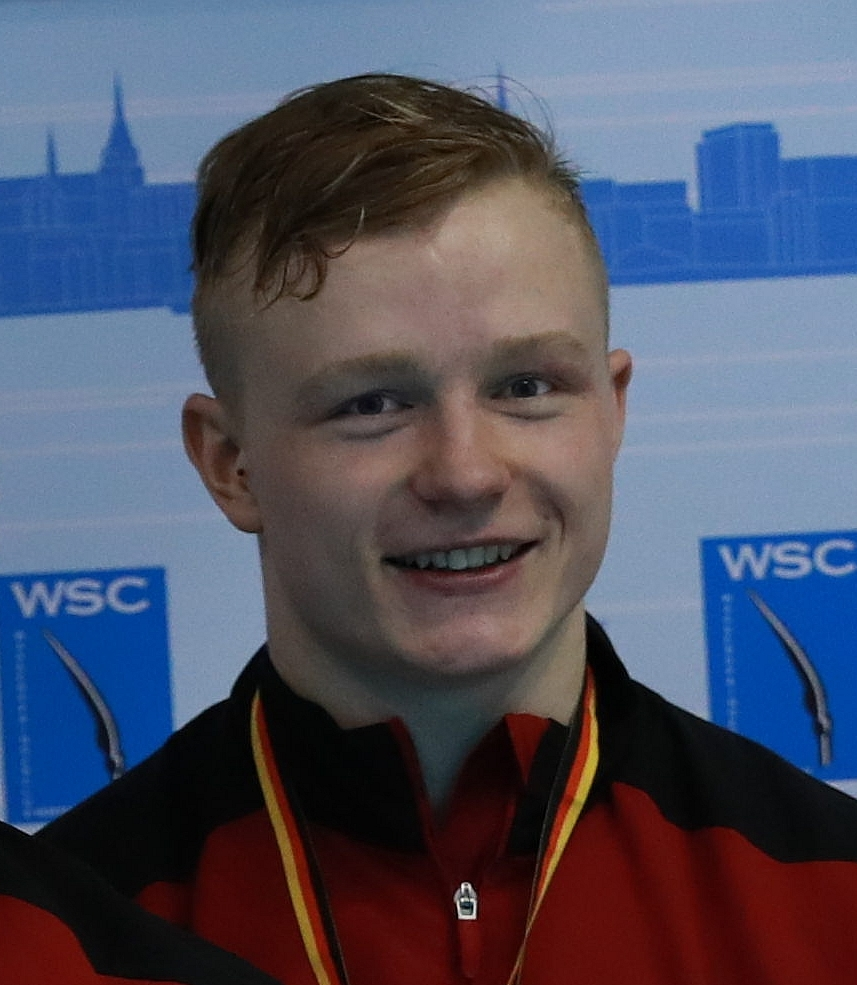
- Frithjof Seidel in 2018

Personal information
- Born: 28 May 1997 (age 29)

Sport
- Country: Germany
- Sport: Diving, synchronized swimming
Medal record
Representing Germany
Men's diving
European Games
Bronze medal – third place	2015 Baku	3 m synchro
Summer Universiade
Silver medal – second place	2019 Naples	1 m springboard
Men's artistic swimming
European Championships
Gold medal – first place	2024 Belgrade	Team technical routine
European Games
Silver medal – second place	2023 Kraków-Małopolska	Free routine combination

Frithjof Seidel (born 28 May 1997) is a German diver. He won the bronze medal in the men's 3 metre synchronized springboard event at the 2015 European Games held in Baku, Azerbaijan, alongside Nico Herzog.

Seidel competed in the men's 1 m springboard event at the 2016 European Aquatics Championships held in London, United Kingdom. He did not advance to compete in the final.

In 2019, Seidel won the silver medal in the men's 1 metre springboard event at the Summer Universiade held in Naples, Italy. In the same year, he competed in the men's 1 metre springboard event at the 2019 World Aquatics Championships held in Gwangju, South Korea. He did not advance to compete in the final.
