= Ilia Molchanov =

Russian diver (born 2003)

Personal information
- Born: 18 February 1997 (age 29) Moscow, Russia

Sport
- Country: Russia
- Sport: Diving
Medal record
Men's diving
Representing Neutral Athletes B
European Championships
Silver medal – second place	2026 Paris	3 m mixed synchro
Representing Russia
European Games
Gold medal – first place	2015 Baku	3 m synchro
Silver medal – second place	2015 Baku	1 m springboard
Bronze medal – third place	2015 Baku	3 m springboard
European Championships
Bronze medal – third place	2020 Budapest	3 m mixed synchro
European Diving Championships
Silver medal – second place	2019 Kyiv	Team
World University Games
Silver medal – second place	2019 Naples	3 m synchro
Bronze medal – third place	2019 Naples	3 m springboard

Ilia Igorevich Molchanov (Russian: Илья Игоревич Молчанов; born 18 February 1997) is a Russian diver.

== Early life ==
Molchanov was born in Moscow.

== Career ==
At the 2026 European Aquatics Championships, he won the silver medal in the mixed 3 m springboard synchro event, pairing with Elizaveta Kuzina.
