= Thomas Fannon =

Irish swimmer (born 1998)

Personal information
- Nickname: Fast-twitch Fannon
- National team: Ireland
- Born: 20 May 1998 (age 28) Birmingham, United Kingdom

Sport
- Country: Ireland
- Sport: Swimming
- Coach: Steve Beckerleg
Medal record
Men's swimming
Representing Great Britain
European Junior Championships
Bronze medal – third place	2016 Hódmezővásárhely	50m Freestyle

Tom Fannon (born 20 May 1998) is an Irish swimmer who competed at the Olympic Games for Ireland.

Fannon had previously competed with England at the Commonwealth Games in 2018 before switching his allegiance to Ireland.

He currently holds the Irish record for the men's 50 metres freestyle set in the semi-finals of the 2024 Summer Olympics.

== Background ==
Fannon was born in Birmingham and was raised in Torquay. He honed his swimming skills with Plymouth Leander where he trained alongside Ben Proud, a future world champion. He qualifies for Ireland through his Galway born grandfather.
