= Cameron Kurle =

British swimmer (born 1997)

Cam Kurle
Personal information
- Full name: Cameron Roland Kurle
- Nationality: British
- Born: 19 July 1997 (age 28) Glastonbury, Somerset, England

Sport
- Sport: Swimming
- Strokes: Freestyle
Medal record
Representing Great Britain
European Championships (LC)
Gold medal – first place	2018 Glasgow	4×200 m freestyle
Bronze medal – third place	2018 Glasgow	4×200 m mixed freestyle
European Games
Gold medal – first place	2015 Baku	4×100 m freestyle
Silver medal – second place	2015 Baku	200 m freestyle
Silver medal – second place	2015 Baku	4×200 m freestyle
Representing England
Commonwealth Games
Silver medal – second place	2018 Gold Coast	4×100 m freestyle
Silver medal – second place	2018 Gold Coast	4×200 m freestyle
Silver medal – second place	2022 Birmingham	4×100 m freestyle

Cameron Roland Kurle (born 19 July 1997) is a British swimmer. He has won a gold and two silvers as a junior at the 2015 European Games. As a senior, he won a silver medal in freestyle relay in the 2018 Commonwealth Games.

== Personal ==
Kurle attended Millfield School.

== Career ==
At the 2015 European Games in Baku, Azerbaijan, he won a gold in the men's 4x100m freestyle relay, and two silvers: in the men's 200m freestyle, and 4x200m freestyle relays.

He competed in the men's 200 metre freestyle event at the 2016 Summer Olympics.

At the 2018 Commonwealth Games held at the Gold Coast, Australia, Kurle won two silvers as part of the team that finished second in the Men's 4x100m and 4x200m freestyle events. He swam in the final of the 4x200m but only in the heats of the 4x100m.

At the 2018 European Championships, Kurle was part of the relay teams that won gold in the 4 × 200 metre freestyle relay and bronze in the 4×200 m mixed freestyle. However, he swam in the heats of both events and not in the finals.
