= Daniel Speers =

British swimmer (born 1997)

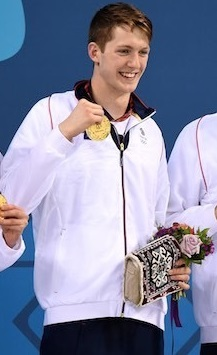
- Daniel Speers at the 2015 european Games

Personal information
- Full name: Daniel Speers
- Nickname: "Dan" "Speersy"
- National team: Great Britain
- Born: 17 June 1997 (age 29) Bournemouth, England
- Height: 1.96 m (6 ft 5 in)
- Weight: 81.5 kg (180 lb; 12.83 st)

Sport
- Sport: Swimming
- Strokes: Freestyle
- Club: University of Notre Dame
- Coach: Jol Finck, Euan Dale
Medal record
Men's swimming
Representing Great Britain
European Games
Gold medal – first place	2015 European Games	4×100 m freestyle
Silver medal – second place	2015 European Games	4×100 m mixed freestyle

Daniel Speers (born 17 June 1997) is a retired English competitive swimmer who has represented Great Britain in the 2015 European Games. Speers specialized in the 50-metre freestyle.

== Career ==
Speers began swimming as a breaststroker, joining Bournemouth Dolphins in 2007. Speers took up freestyle as his main event shortly after joining Poole Swimming club. Head coach Robin Armayan, worked extensively on Speers' freestyle technique. In September 2013, Speers joined Millfield School where he was coached by Euan Dale and Jol Finck. Speers later represented Great Britain at the European Games, in his second year of Millfield, winning two relay medals. Speers swam at the University of Notre Dame under head coach Matthew Tallman.

== See also ==
- 2015 European Games medal table
- List of 2015 European Games medal winners
