= List of European Games records in swimming =

The fastest times in the swimming events at the European Games are designated as the European Games records in swimming. The events are held in a long course (50 m) pool. The last Games were held in Baku, Azerbaijan in 2015.

All records were set in finals unless noted otherwise.

== Long Course (50 m) ==
=== Men ===
Event	Time		Name	Nationality	Date	Meet	Location	Ref
50m freestyle	22.16		Ziv Kalontarov	Israel	27 June 2015	2015 Games	Baku, Azerbaijan	
100m freestyle	49.43		Duncan Scott	Great Britain	25 June 2015	2015 Games	Baku, Azerbaijan	
200m freestyle	1:48.55		Duncan Scott	Great Britain	27 June 2015	2015 Games	Baku, Azerbaijan	
400m freestyle	3:52.43		Paul Hentschel	Germany	23 June 2015	2015 Games	Baku, Azerbaijan	
800m freestyle	7:59.87		Nicolas D'Oriano	France	26 June 2015	2015 Games	Baku, Azerbaijan	
1500m freestyle	15:13.31		Nicolas D'Oriano	France	24 June 2015	2015 Games	Baku, Azerbaijan	
50m backstroke	25.40		Filipp Shopin	Russia	26 June 2015	2015 Games	Baku, Azerbaijan	
100m backstroke	54.64	r	Luke Greenbank	Great Britain	27 June 2015	2015 Games	Baku, Azerbaijan	
200m backstroke	1:56.89		Luke Greenbank	Great Britain	26 June 2015	2015 Games	Baku, Azerbaijan	
50m breaststroke	27.75	sf	Andrius Šidlauskas	Lithuania	25 June 2015	2015 Games	Baku, Azerbaijan	
100m breaststroke	1:00.65		Anton Chupkov	Russia	27 June 2015	2015 Games	Baku, Azerbaijan	
200m breaststroke	2:10.69	sf	Anton Chupkov	Russia	23 June 2015	2015 Games	Baku, Azerbaijan	
50m butterfly	23.90	sf	Andriy Khloptsov	Ukraine	23 June 2015	2015 Games	Baku, Azerbaijan	
100m butterfly	52.13	sf	Daniil Pakhomov	Russia	26 June 2015	2015 Games	Baku, Azerbaijan	
200m butterfly	1:57.04		Daniil Pakhomov	Russia	25 June 2015	2015 Games	Baku, Azerbaijan	
200m individual medley	2:01.39		Sebastian Steffan	Austria	25 June 2015	2015 Games	Baku, Azerbaijan	
400m individual medley	4:19.44		Nikolay Sokolov	Russia	27 June 2015	2015 Games	Baku, Azerbaijan	
4×100m freestyle relay	3:19.38		Duncan Scott (49.46); Martyn Walton (49.43); Daniel Speers (50.68); Cameron Kurle (49.81)	Great Britain	23 June 2015	2015 Games	Baku, Azerbaijan	
4×200m freestyle relay	7:16.08		Aleksandr Prokofev (1:50.29); Nikolay Snegirev (1:48.89); Ernest Maksumov (1:48.96); Elisei Stepanov (1:47.94)	Russia	25 June 2015	2015 Games	Baku, Azerbaijan	
4×100m medley relay	3:36.38		Filipp Shopin (55.47); Anton Chupkov (1:00.27); Daniil Pakhomov (51.55); Vladislav Kozlov (49.09)	Russia	27 June 2015	2015 Games	Baku, Azerbaijan	

Legend: # – Record awaiting ratification by EOC;
Records not set in finals: h – heat; sf – semifinal; r – relay 1st leg; rh – relay heat 1st leg; † – en route to final mark

=== Women ===
Event	Time		Name	Nationality	Date	Meet	Location	Ref
50m freestyle	25.23		Maria Kameneva	Russia	26 June 2015	2015 Games	Baku, Azerbaijan	
100m freestyle	53.97	=, sf	Marrit Steenbergen	Netherlands	23 June 2015	2015 Games	Baku, Azerbaijan	
100m freestyle	53.97	=	Marrit Steenbergen	Netherlands	24 June 2015	2015 Games	Baku, Azerbaijan	
200m freestyle	1:58.22		Arina Openysheva	Russia	26 June 2015	2015 Games	Baku, Azerbaijan	
400m freestyle	4:08.81		Arina Openysheva	Russia	24 June 2015	2015 Games	Baku, Azerbaijan	
800m freestyle	8:39.02		Holly Hibbott	Great Britain	23 June 2015	2015 Games	Baku, Azerbaijan	
1500m freestyle	16:40.17		Sveva Schiazzano	Italy	25 June 2015	2015 Games	Baku, Azerbaijan	
50m backstroke	28.60		Caroline Pilhatsch	Austria	25 June 2015	2015 Games	Baku, Azerbaijan	
100m backstroke	1:01.19		Polina Egorova	Russia	27 June 2015	2015 Games	Baku, Azerbaijan	
200m backstroke	2:11.23		Polina Egorova	Russia	24 June 2015	2015 Games	Baku, Azerbaijan	
50m breaststroke	31.47	sf	Maria Astashkina	Russia	23 June 2015	2015 Games	Baku, Azerbaijan	
100m breaststroke	1:07.71		Maria Astashkina	Russia	27 June 2015	2015 Games	Baku, Azerbaijan	
200m breaststroke	2:23.06		Maria Astashkina	Russia	25 June 2015	2015 Games	Baku, Azerbaijan	
50m butterfly	26.82		Polina Egorova	Russia	27 June 2015	2015 Games	Baku, Azerbaijan	
100m butterfly	59.36		Polina Egorova	Russia	26 June 2015	2015 Games	Baku, Azerbaijan	
200m butterfly	2:11.19		Julia Mrozinski	Germany	24 June 2015	2015 Games	Baku, Azerbaijan	
200m individual medley	2:13.37		Maxine Wolters	Germany	27 June 2015	2015 Games	Baku, Azerbaijan	
400m individual medley	4:41.97		Abbie Wood	Great Britain	23 June 2015	2015 Games	Baku, Azerbaijan	
4×100m freestyle relay	3:43.63		Arina Openysheva (55.06); Vasilissa Buinaia (56.75); Olesia Cherniatina (56.88); Maria Kameneva (54.94)	Russia	23 June 2015	2015 Games	Baku, Azerbaijan	
4×200m freestyle relay	8:03.45		Anastasiia Kirpichnikova (2:01.54); Arina Openysheva (1:58.04); Olesia Cherniatina (2:02.82); Irina Krivonogova (2:01.05)	Russia	27 June 2015	2015 Games	Baku, Azerbaijan	
4×100m medley relay	4:03.22		Mariia Kameneva (1:01.39); Maria Astashkina (1:07.61); Polina Egorova (59.64); Arina Openysheva (54.58)	Russia	25 June 2015	2015 Games	Baku, Azerbaijan	

Legend: # – Record awaiting ratification by EOC;
Records not set in finals: h – heat; sf – semifinal; r – relay 1st leg; rh – relay heat 1st leg

=== Mixed relay ===
Event	Time	Name	Nationality	Date	Meet	Location	Ref
4×100m freestyle relay	3:30.30	Vladislav Kozlov (50.07); Elisei Stepanov (50.25); Mariia Kameneva (55.07); Arina Openysheva (54.91)	Russia	24 June 2015	2015 Games	Baku, Azerbaijan	
4×100m medley relay	3:49.53	Maria Kameneva (1:01.85); Anton Chupkov (1:00.42); Daniil Pakhomov (52.04); Arina Openysheva (55.22)	Russia	26 June 2015	2015 Games	Baku, Azerbaijan	

Legend: # – Record awaiting ratification by EOC;
Records not set in finals: h – heat
