= Aquatic Palace =

Sports venue in Baku, Azerbaijan

- Baku Aquatics Centre
- Interactive map of Aquatic Palace
- Address: Baku, Azerbaijan
- Coordinates: 40.334883°N 49.835045°E
- Capacity: 6,000-10,000
- Pool size: Length: 50 m (160 ft); Width: 22 m (72 ft)

Construction
- Built: 2013–2015
- Opened: 20 April 2015
- Architect: Securo CO.LTD

The Aquatic Palace is a sporting venue in Baku, Azerbaijan, which is fully compliant with the requirements of the International Swimming Federation (FINA). The Palace hosted the Baku 2015 European Games and 2017 Islamic Solidarity Games.

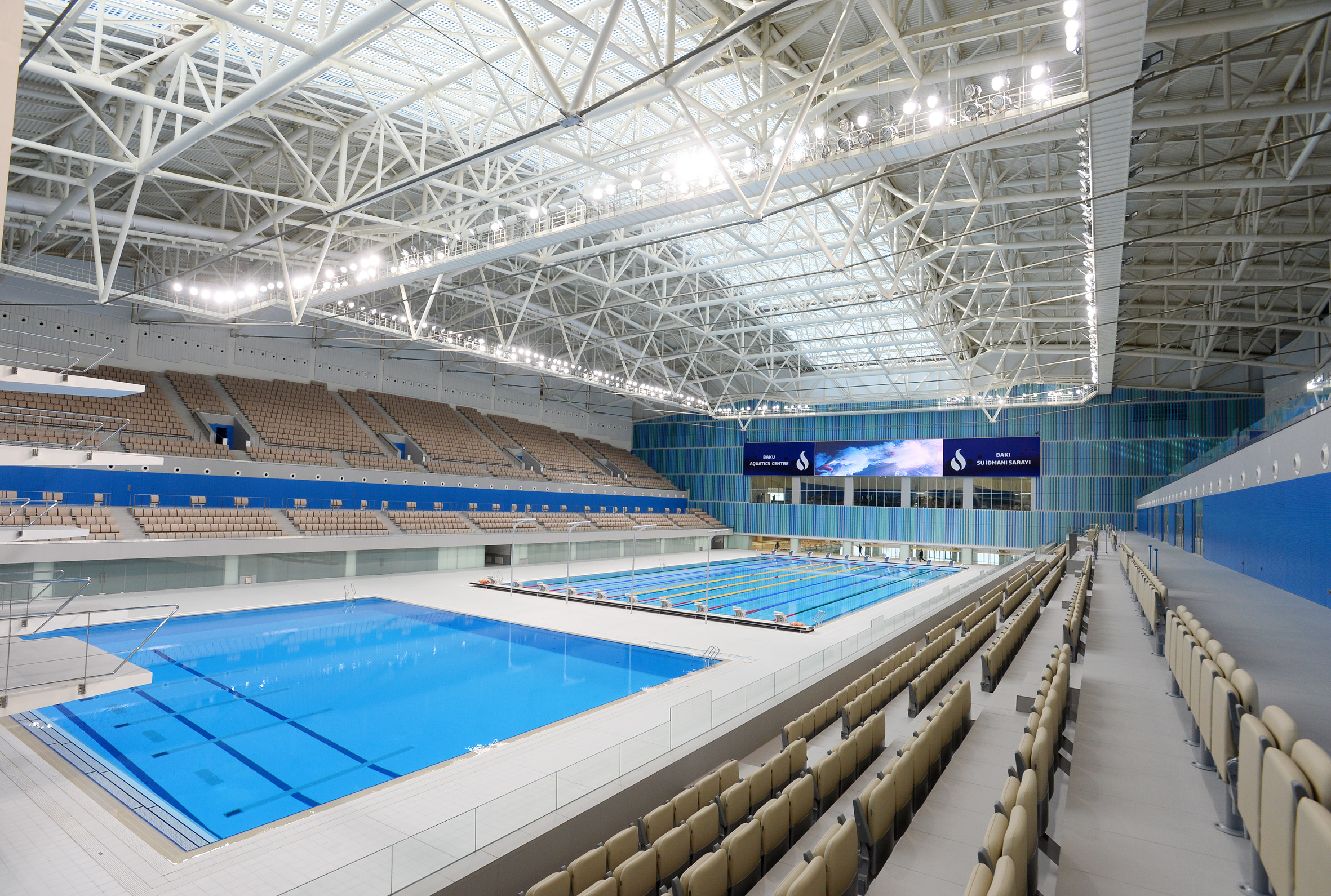
Olympic-size swimming pool, Baku Aquatic Palace

The Aquatic Palace has three swimming pools, including an Olympic-size pool designed for holding different types of competitions at local and international levels. The length of the pool for diving is 25 meters in height and 20 meters in width and has a five-stage platform for high board diving from a height of 3, 5, 7, 5 and 10 meters. 6,000-10,000 spectators can watch sports competitions, concerts at the palace.

The palace also has sectors for VIP, media and disabled people. In one part of the roof of the building used special panoramic glass panels which can convert solar energy into electricity. The generated electricity will be used for energy supply to some sections of the Palace.
