= Swimming at the 2015 European Games – Women's 100 metre backstroke =

Women's 100 metre backstroke at the 2015 European Games
- Venue: Aquatic Palace
- Dates: 26–27 June
- Competitors: 41 from 27 nations
- Winning time: 1:01.19

Medalists
gold medal	Polina Egorova	Russia
silver medal	Maria Kameneva	Russia
bronze medal	Pauline Mahieu	France

The women's 100 metre backstroke event at the 2015 European Games in Baku took place on 26 and 27 June at the Aquatic Palace.

== Results ==
=== Heats ===
The heats were started on 26 June at 09:51.

Rank	Heat	Lane	Name	Nationality	Time	Notes
1	5	4	Maria Kameneva	Russia	1:01.86	Q
2	4	4	Polina Egorova	Russia	1:02.10	Q
3	3	4	Pauline Mahieu	France	1:02.41	Q
4	5	5	Maryna Kolesnykova	Ukraine	1:02.59	Q
5	4	2	Martina Rossi	Italy	1:03.43	Q
6	4	3	Iris Tjonk	Netherlands	1:03.68	Q
7	5	3	Caroline Pilhatsch	Austria	1:03.91	Q
7	5	6	Dalma Matyasovszky	Hungary	1:03.91	Q
9	5	7	Boyana Tomova	Bulgaria	1:04.31	Q
10	4	6	Tania Quaglieri	Italy	1:04.42	Q
11	3	5	Rebecca Sherwin	Great Britain	1:04.48	Q
12	3	3	Giulia Ramatelli	Italy	1:04.58	
13	3	7	Lia Neubert	Germany	1:04.61	Q
14	4	7	Jana Augenstein	Germany	1:04.78	Q
15	3	1	Dorottya Dobos	Hungary	1:04.80	Q
16	3	2	Victoria Bierre	Denmark	1:04.85	Q
17	5	1	Ioanna Sacha	Greece	1:05.09	Q
18	2	5	Margaryta Bokan	Ukraine	1:05.28	
19	3	8	Gabriela Bernat	Poland	1:05.34	
20	4	5	Martina Menotti	Italy	1:05.35	
21	3	6	Danielle Hill	Ireland	1:05.49	
22	5	0	Vladyslava Maznytska	Ukraine	1:05.64	
23	2	4	Or Tamir	Israel	1:05.90	
24	4	9	Eline van den Bossche	Luxembourg	1:06.11	
25	4	8	Iseult Hayes	Ireland	1:06.18	
26	3	0	Sara Rashid Taghipour	Austria	1:06.20	
27	5	8	Arina Baikova	Latvia	1:06.36	
28	2	3	Melek Ayarci	Finland	1:06.40	
29	2	6	Michaela Trnková	Czech Republic	1:06.42	
30	5	9	Meda Kulbačiauskaitė	Lithuania	1:06.72	
31	2	2	Signhild Joensen	LEN ( Faroe Islands)	1:06.90	
32	4	0	Eveliina Kallio	Finland	1:07.08	
33	3	9	Darya Douhal	Belarus	1:07.20	
34	5	2	Ava Schollmayer	Slovenia	1:07.99	
35	2	7	Maria Bjarnastein Antoft	LEN ( Faroe Islands)	1:08.80	
36	1	4	Diana Petkova	Bulgaria	1:09.11	
37	2	0	Lamija Medošević	Bosnia and Herzegovina	1:09.95	
38	2	1	Yuliya Stisyuk	Azerbaijan	1:10.50	
39	2	8	Tetiana Kudako	Ukraine	1:12.07	
40	1	5	Flaka Pruthi	Kosovo	1:14.13	
41	1	3	Jana Serafimovska	Macedonia	1:15.32	
	4	1	Lova Andersson	Sweden	DNS	

=== Semifinals ===
The semifinals were started on 26 June at 17:44.

==== Semifinal 1 ====
Rank	Lane	Name	Nationality	Time	Notes
1	4	Polina Egorova	Russia	1:01.97	Q
2	5	Maryna Kolesnykova	Ukraine	1:02.34	Q
3	3	Iris Tjonk	Netherlands	1:03.00	q
4	2	Tania Quaglieri	Italy	1:03.25	q
5	6	Dalma Matyasovszky	Hungary	1:03.36	q
6	7	Lia Neubert	Germany	1:04.42	
7	8	Ioanna Sacha	Greece	1:04.73	
8	1	Dorottya Dobos	Hungary	1:04.76	

==== Semifinal 2 ====
Rank	Lane	Name	Nationality	Time	Notes
1	4	Maria Kameneva	Russia	1:01.57	Q
2	3	Pauline Mahieu	France	1:02.07	Q
3	2	Martina Rossi	Italy	1:03.62	q
4	6	Caroline Pilhatsch	Austria	1:03.83	
5	5	Boyana Tomova	Bulgaria	1:03.98	
6	7	Rebecca Sherwin	Great Britain	1:04.56	
7	1	Jana Augenstein	Germany	1:04.57	
8	8	Victoria Bierre	Denmark	1:04.65	

=== Final ===
The final was held on 27 June at 17:52.

Rank	Lane	Name	Nationality	Time	Notes
1st place, gold medalist(s)	5	Polina Egorova	Russia	1:01.19	GR
2nd place, silver medalist(s)	4	Maria Kameneva	Russia	1:01.23	
3rd place, bronze medalist(s)	3	Pauline Mahieu	France	1:01.34	
4	6	Maryna Kolesnykova	Ukraine	1:02.25	
5	1	Dalma Matyasovszky	Hungary	1:03.12	
6	8	Martina Rossi	Italy	1:03.14	
7	7	Tania Quaglieri	Italy	1:03.62	
8	2	Iris Tjonk	Netherlands	1:03.84	
