= Swimming at the 2015 European Games =

Swimming at the 1st European Games
- Venue: Baku Aquatics Centre
- Dates: 23–27 June 2015
- Competitors: 526

The swimming events at the 2015 European Games took place at the Baku Aquatics Centre, Baku from 23 to 27 June 2015. 42 events were contested in long course conditions.

Swimming was not included in the earliest list of sports confirmed for the 2015 Games, as the European swimming authorities at that stage were minded not to take part. However, following negotiations with the organising authorities, a compromise was reached whereby, in 2015, these events were for junior swimmers only - in effect, under 18 for men, under 16 for women.

In effect, therefore, the swimming portion of the 2015 European Games doubled as the 2015 European Junior Swimming Championships.

== Programme ==
A number of non-Olympic distances will be raced, in addition to a full Olympic programme. The 50 metre sprint in backstroke, breaststroke, and butterfly will be held for both genders, the 800 metre freestyle for men, the 1500 metre freestyle for women and mixed gender 4 x 100 metre relays, both freestyle and medley.

== Timetable ==
OC	Opening ceremony	T	Training day	●	Event competitions	1	Event finals	CC	Closing ceremony

June	12th Fri	13th Sat	14th Sun	15th Mon	16th Tue	17th Wed	18th Thu	19th Fri	20th Sat	21st Sun	22nd Mon	23rd Tue	24th Wed	25th Thu	26th Fri	27th Sat	28th Sun	Events
Swimming	OC									T	T	7	8	9	7	11	CC	42

== Qualification ==
Following the European Junior Swimming Championships in July 2014, (Dordrecht, Netherlands), LEN will confirm the quotas per NOC and discipline based on an average ranking by NOC from the last three European Junior Swimming Championships.

== Results ==
=== Men's events ===
Event	Gold		Silver		Bronze	
50 m freestyle	Ziv Kalontorov; Israel	22.16	Giovanni Izzo; Italy	22.51	Aleksei Brianskiy; Russia	22.69
100 m freestyle	Duncan Scott; Great Britain	49.43	Alessandro Miressi; Italy	50.03	Vladislav Kozlov; Russia	50.11
200 m freestyle	Duncan Scott; Great Britain	1:48.55	Cameron Kurle; Great Britain	1:48.92	Elisei Stepanov; Russia	1:49.64
400 m freestyle	Paul Hentschel; Germany	3:52.43	Dimitrios Dimitriou; Greece	3:52.57	Ernest Maksumov; Russia	3:52.65
800 m freestyle	Nicolas D'Oriano; France	7:59.87	Marcos Rodríguez; Spain	8:01.73	Henning Mühlleitner; Germany	8:04.33
1500 m freestyle	Nicolas D'Oriano; France	15:13.31	Ernest Maksumov; Russia	15:13.90	Marc Hinawi; Israel	15:25.63
50 m backstroke	Filipp Shopin; Russia	25.40	Marek Ulrich; Germany	25.44	Andrii Khloptsov; Ukraine	25.71
100 m backstroke	Luke Greenbank; Great Britain	54.76	Filipp Shopin; Russia	54.81	Marek Ulrich; Germany	55.35
200 m backstroke	Luke Greenbank; Great Britain	1:56.89 WJR	Mikita Tsmyh; Belarus	1:59.46	Roman Larin; Russia	1:59.60
50 m breaststroke	Andrius Šidlauskas; Lithuania	27.81	Nikola Obrovac; Croatia	27.89	Tobias Bjerg; Denmark	28.04
100 m breaststroke	Anton Chupkov; Russia	1:00.65 WJR	Andrius Šidlauskas; Lithuania	1:01.42	Charlie Attwood; Great Britain	1:01.71
200 m breaststroke	Anton Chupkov; Russia	2:10.85	Kirill Mordashev; Russia	2:12.94	Luke Davies; Great Britain	2:13.45
50 m butterfly	Andrii Khloptsov; Ukraine	23.92	Paweł Sendyk; Poland	23.97	Daniil Pakhomov; Russia	24.02
100 m butterfly	Daniil Pakhomov; Russia	52.72	Alberto Lozano; Spain	52.78	Daniil Antipov; Russia	53.36
200 m butterfly	Daniil Pakhomov; Russia	1:57.04	Giacomo Carini; Italy	1:57.46	Matthias Marsau; France	1:58.96
200 m individual medley	Sebastian Steffan; Austria	2:01.39	Jarvis Parkinson; Great Britain	2:01.94	Martyn Walton; Great Britain	2:02.24
400 m individual medley	Nikolay Sokolov; Russia	4:19.44	Igor Balyberdin; Russia	4:20.80	Karol Zbutowicz; Poland	4:22.22
4×100 m freestyle relay	Great Britain (GBR); Duncan Scott (49.46); Martyn Walton (49.43); Daniel Speers (50.68); Cameron Kurle (49.81); Thomas Fannon	3:19.38	Italy (ITA); Alessandro Miressi (50.09); Giovanni Izzo (50.34); Ivano Vendrame (50.21); Alessandro Bori (49.55); Manuel Frigo	3:20.19	Russia (RUS); Vladislav Kozlov (50.44); Aleksei Brianskiy (50.09); Elisei Stepanov (49.76); Igor Shadrin (49.93); Georg Gutmann; Sergei Sudakov	3:20.22
4×200 m freestyle relay	Russia (RUS); Aleksandr Prokofev (1:50.29); Nikolay Snegirev (1:48.89); Ernest Maksumov (1:48.96); Elisei Stepanov (1:47.94); Igor Shadrin; Daniil Antipov	7:16.08	Great Britain (GBR); Duncan Scott (1:49.89); Martyn Walton (1:50.42); Kyle Chisholm (1:50.02); Cameron Kurle (1:49.03)	7:19.36	Germany (GER); Paul Hentschel (1:49.78); Henning Mühlleitner (1:50.77); Konstantin Walter (1:50.39); Moritz Brandt (1:49.83); Alexander Lohmar; Thore Bermel	7:20.77
4×100 m medley relay	Russia (RUS); Filipp Shopin (55.47); Anton Chupkov (1:00.27); Daniil Pakhomov (51.55); Vladislav Kozlov (49.09); Roman Larin; Egor Suchkov; Daniil Antipov; Aleksei Brianskiy	3:36.38 WJR	Great Britain (GBR); Luke Greenbank (54.64); Charlie Attwood (1:01.36); Duncan Scott (52.79); Martyn Walton (50.22); Joe Hulme; Luke Davies; Kyle Chisholm; Cameron Kurle	3:39.01	Poland (POL); Jakub Skierka (55.85); Jacek Arentewicz (1:01.22); Michał Chudy (52.86); Paweł Sendyk (49.38); Damian Chrzanowski; Michał Brzuś	3:39.31

=== Women's events ===
Event	Gold		Silver		Bronze	
50 m freestyle	Maria Kameneva; Russia	25.23	Marrit Steenbergen; Netherlands	25.27	Julie Kepp Jensen; Denmark	25.41
100 m freestyle	Marrit Steenbergen; Netherlands	53.97	Arina Openysheva; Russia	54.45	Maria Kameneva; Russia	55.19
200 m freestyle	Arina Openysheva; Russia	1:58.22	Marrit Steenbergen; Netherlands	1:58.99	Leonie Kullmann; Germany	1:59.77
400 m freestyle	Arina Openysheva; Russia	4:08.91	Leonie Kullmann; Germany	4:12.16	Anastasiya Kirpichnikova; Russia	4:13.13
800 m freestyle	Holly Hibbott; Great Britain	8:39.02	Anastasiya Kirpichnikova; Russia	8:39.73	Marina Castro Atalaya; Spain	8:45.51
1500 m freestyle	Sveva Schiazzano; Italy	16:40.17	Janka Juhász; Hungary	16:40.39	Marina Castro Atalaya; Spain	16:46.16
50 m backstroke	Caroline Pilhatsch; Austria	28.60	Pauline Mahieu; France	28.70	Maria Kameneva; Russia	28.77
100 m backstroke	Polina Egorova; Russia	1:01.19	Maria Kameneva; Russia	1:01.23	Pauline Mahieu; France	1:01.34
200 m backstroke	Polina Egorova; Russia	2:11.23	Maxime Wolters; Germany	2:11.38	Maryna Kolesnykova; Ukraine	2:11.91
50 m breaststroke	Maria Astashkina; Russia	31.58	Laura Kelsch; Germany	31.87	Nolwenn Hervé; France	32.08
100 m breaststroke	Maria Astashkina; Russia	1:07.71	Giuila Verona; Italy	1:08.61	Daria Chikunova; Russia	1:09.02
200 m breaststroke	Maria Astashkina; Russia	2:23.06 WJR	Giuila Verona; Italy	2:25.91	Layla Black; Great Britain	2:27.61
50 m butterfly	Polina Egorova; Russia	26.82	Caroline Pilhatsch; Austria	27.18	Julie Kepp Jensen; Denmark	27.19
100 m butterfly	Polina Egorova; Russia	59.36	Amelia Clynes; Great Britain	1:00.22	Ilektra Lebl; Greece Laura Stephens; Great Britain	1:00.54
200 m butterfly	Julia Mrozinski; Germany	2:11.19	Elisa Scarpa Vidal; Italy	2:12.27	Boglárka Bonecz; Hungary	2:12.42
200 m individual medley	Maxime Wolters; Germany	2:13.37	Ilaria Cusinato; Italy	2:13.78	Abbie Wood; Great Britain	2:14.49
400 m individual medley	Abbie Wood; Great Britain	4:41.97	Ilaria Cusinato; Italy	4:44.01	Anja Crevar; Serbia	4:45.84; NR
4×100 m freestyle relay	Russia (RUS); Arina Openysheva (55.06); Vasilissa Buinaia (56.75); Olesia Cherniatina (56.88); Maria Kameneva (54.94); Polina Egorova; Anastasiya Kirpichnikova	3:43.63	Netherlands (NED); Pien Schravesande (57.64); Frederique Janssen (56.87); Laura van Engelen (56.59); Marrit Steenbergen (53.00); Josien Wijkhuijs	3:44.10	Great Britain (GBR); Darcy Deakin (56.75); Madeleine Crompton (56.93); Hannah Featherstone (56.56); Georgia Coates (55.56); Holly Hibbott	3:45.80
4×200 m freestyle relay	Russia (RUS); Anastasiya Kirpichnikova (2:01.54); Arina Openysheva (1:58.04); Olesia Cherniatina (2:02.82); Irina Krivonogova (2:01.05); Maria Kameneva; Mariana Petrova	8:03.45	Netherlands (NED); Laura van Engelen (2:01.39); Frederique Janssen (2:03.27); Marieke Tienstra (2:01.95); Marrit Steenbergen (1:58.04)	8:04.65	Great Britain (GBR); Hannah Featherstone (2:02.85); Darcy Deakin (2:01.76); Holly Hibbott (2:00.34); Georgia Coates (1:59.89); Madeleine Crompton	8:04.84
4×100 m medley relay	Russia (RUS); Maria Kameneva (1:01.39); Maria Astashkina (1:07.61); Polina Egorova (59.64); Arina Openysheva (54.58); Daria Chikunova; Alexandra Chesnokova; Vasilissa Buinaia	4:03.22 WJR	Netherlands (NED); Iris Tjonk (1:02.82); Tes Schouten (1:10.79); Josein Wijkhuis (1:01.35); Marrit Steenbergen (53.03); Marieke Tienstra; Frederique Janssen	4:07.99	Great Britain (GBR); Rebecca Sherwin (1:03.84); Layla Black (1:09.26); Amelia Clynes (1:00.11); Georgia Coates (55.89); Emma Cain; Abbie Wood; Darcy Deakin	4:09.10

=== Mixed events ===
Event	Gold		Silver		Bronze	
4×100 m freestyle relay	Russia (RUS); Vladislav Kozlov (50.07); Elisei Stepanov (50.25); Mariia Kameneva (55.07); Arina Openysheva (54.91); Igor Shadrin; Aleksei Brianskiy; Vasilissa Buinaia; Olesia Cherniatina	3:30.30	Great Britain (GBR); Duncan Scott (49.59); Martyn Walton (50.37); Darcy Deakin (56.51); Georgia Coates (56.18); Cameron Kurle; Madeleine Crompton; Daniel Speers; Hannah Featherstone	3:32.65	Germany (GER); Alexander Lohmar (51.23); Leonie Kullmann (56.39); Katrin Gottwald (55.77); Konstantin Walter (50.35); Hana van Loock	3:33.74
4×100 m medley relay	Russia (RUS); Mariia Kameneva (1:01.85); Anton Chupkov (1:00.42); Daniil Pakhomov (52.04); Arina Openysheva (55.22); Filip Shopin; Daria Chikunova; Roman Shevliakov; Vasilissa Buinaia	3:49.53	Great Britain (GBR); Luke Greenbank (54.86); Charlie Attwood (1:00.78); Amelia Clynes (1:00.85); Georgia Coates (55.54); Joe Litchfield; Luke Davies; Abbie Wood; Hannah Featherstone	3:52.03	Germany (GER); Maxine Wolters (1:01.48); Leo Schmidt (1:02.66); Johannes Tesch (53.81); Katrin Gottwald (56.32); Marek Ulrich; Laura Kelsch; Hana van Loock	3:54.27

== Medal table ==
Rank	Nation	Gold	Silver	Bronze	Total
1	Russia (RUS)	23	7	12	42
2	Great Britain (GBR)	7	7	9	23
3	Germany (GER)	3	4	6	13
4	France (FRA)	2	1	3	6
5	Austria (AUT)	2	1	0	3
6	Italy (ITA)	1	9	0	10
7	Netherlands (NED)	1	5	0	6
8	Lithuania (LTU)	1	1	0	2
9	Ukraine (UKR)	1	0	2	3
10	Israel (ISR)	1	0	1	2
11	Spain (ESP)	0	2	2	4
12	Poland (POL)	0	1	2	3
13	Greece (GRE)	0	1	1	2
13	Hungary (HUN)	0	1	1	2
15	Belarus (BLR)	0	1	0	1
15	Croatia (CRO)	0	1	0	1
17	Denmark (DEN)	0	0	3	3
18	Serbia (SRB)	0	0	1	1
Totals (18 entries)		42	42	43	127
