= Swimming at the 2015 European Games – Women's 50 metre backstroke =

Women's 50 metre backstroke at the 2015 European Games
- Venue: Aquatic Palace
- Dates: 25 June
- Competitors: 47 from 29 nations
- Winning time: 28.60

Medalists
gold medal	Caroline Pilhatsch	Austria
silver medal	Pauline Mahieu	France
bronze medal	Maria Kameneva	Russia

The women's 50 metre backstroke event at the 2015 European Games in Baku took place on 25 June at the Aquatic Palace.

== Results ==
=== Heats ===
The heats were started at 09:30.

Rank	Heat	Lane	Name	Nationality	Time	Notes
1	4	3	Pauline Mahieu	France	28.69	Q, GR
2	4	4	Caroline Pilhatsch	Austria	28.80	Q
3	5	4	Maria Kameneva	Russia	28.96	Q
4	3	5	Julie Kepp Jensen	Denmark	29.04	Q
5	5	5	Polina Egorova	Russia	29.08	Q
6	3	3	Tania Quaglieri	Italy	29.24	Q
7	4	6	Maxine Wolters	Germany	29.35	Q
8	3	4	Martina Menotti	Italy	29.41	Q
9	3	2	Maryna Kolesnykova	Ukraine	29.83	Q
10	4	5	Ava Schollmayer	Slovenia	29.83	Q
11	2	8	Barbora Janíčková	Czech Republic	30.00	Q
12	3	8	Boyana Tomova	Bulgaria	30.08	Q
12	5	9	Margaryta Bokan	Ukraine	30.08	Q
14	3	1	Lia Neubert	Germany	30.10	Q
15	5	1	Victoria Bierre	Denmark	30.17	Q
16	5	6	Iris Tjonk	Netherlands	30.22	QSO
16	5	2	Rebecca Sherwin	Great Britain	30.22	QSO
18	4	1	Julia Gus	Poland	30.24	
18	5	8	Or Tamir	Israel	30.24	
20	5	0	Conni Rott	Austria	30.25	
21	4	0	Danielle Hill	Ireland	30.26	
22	5	7	Sezin Eligül	Turkey	30.34	
23	5	3	Margaret Markvardt	Estonia	30.40	
24	2	2	Hana van Loock	Germany	30.43	
25	3	6	Jana Augenstein	Germany	30.45	
26	4	2	Lova Andersson	Sweden	30.46	
27	2	6	Melek Ayarci	Finland	30.60	
28	4	8	Iseult Hayes	Ireland	30.61	
29	4	7	Arina Baikova	Latvia	30.62	
30	3	9	Meda Kulbačiauskaitė	Lithuania	30.72	
31	1	7	Ioanna Sacha	Greece	30.78	
31	2	4	Michaela Trnková	Czech Republic	30.78	
33	3	7	Roosa Mört	Finland	30.81	
34	1	5	Giulia Ramatelli	Italy	30.92	
35	4	9	Vladyslava Maznytska	Ukraine	30.95	
36	2	7	Eline van den Bossche	Luxembourg	30.96	
37	2	5	Gabriela Bernat	Poland	30.98	
38	3	0	Dalma Matyasovszky	Hungary	30.99	
39	2	1	Dorottya Dobos	Hungary	31.00	
40	2	3	Eveliina Kallio	Finland	31.19	
41	2	9	Signhild Joensen	LEN ( Faroe Islands)	31.42	
42	1	3	Nea-Amanda Heinola	Finland	31.46	
43	1	4	Maria Bjarnastein Antoft	LEN ( Faroe Islands)	31.78	
44	2	0	Darya Douhal	Belarus	31.81	
45	1	6	Yuliya Stisyuk	Azerbaijan	33.05	
46	1	2	Flaka Pruthi	Kosovo	33.49	
47	1	1	Jana Serafimovska	Macedonia	34.40	

=== Swim-off ===
Rank	Lane	Name	Nationality	Time	Notes
1	4	Iris Tjonk	Netherlands	29.84	Q
2	5	Rebecca Sherwin	Great Britain	30.13	

=== Semifinals ===
The semifinals were started at 17:37.

==== Semifinal 1 ====
Rank	Lane	Name	Nationality	Time	Notes
1	4	Caroline Pilhatsch	Austria	28.63	Q, GR
2	3	Tania Quaglieri	Italy	28.97	Q
3	5	Julie Kepp Jensen	Denmark	29.29	q
4	6	Martina Menotti	Italy	29.37	q
5	7	Boyana Tomova	Bulgaria	29.66	
6	2	Ava Schollmayer	Slovenia	29.75	
7	8	Iris Tjonk	Netherlands	29.80	
8	1	Lia Neubert	Germany	30.00	

==== Semifinal 2 ====
Rank	Lane	Name	Nationality	Time	Notes
1	4	Pauline Mahieu	France	28.74	Q
2	5	Maria Kameneva	Russia	28.94	Q
3	6	Maxine Wolters	Germany	29.15	q
4	3	Polina Egorova	Russia	29.29	q
5	2	Maryna Kolesnykova	Ukraine	29.72	
6	1	Margaryta Bokan	Ukraine	29.75	
7	7	Barbora Janíčková	Czech Republic	30.09	
8	8	Victoria Bierre	Denmark	30.16	

=== Final ===
The final was held at 18:59.

Rank	Lane	Name	Nationality	Time	Notes
1st place, gold medalist(s)	4	Caroline Pilhatsch	Austria	28.60	GR
2nd place, silver medalist(s)	5	Pauline Mahieu	France	28.70	
3rd place, bronze medalist(s)	3	Maria Kameneva	Russia	28.77	
4	2	Maxine Wolters	Germany	29.00	
5	7	Julie Kepp Jensen	Denmark	29.12	
6	6	Tania Quaglieri	Italy	29.16	
7	1	Polina Egorova	Russia	29.41	
8	8	Martina Menotti	Italy	29.49	
