= Swimming at the 2015 European Games – Women's 200 metre backstroke =

Women's 200 metre backstroke at the 2015 European Games
- Venue: Aquatic Palace
- Dates: 23–24 June
- Competitors: 34 from 24 nations
- Winning time: 2:11.23

Medalists
gold medal	Polina Egorova	Russia
silver medal	Maxine Wolters	Germany
bronze medal	Maryna Kolesnykova	Ukraine

The women's 200 metre backstroke event at the 2015 European Games in Baku took place on 23 and 24 June at the Aquatic Palace.

== Results ==
=== Heats ===
The heats were started on 23 June at 11:35.

Rank	Heat	Lane	Name	Nationality	Time	Notes
1	3	5	Maxine Wolters	Germany	2:11.93	Q, GR
2	3	4	Polina Egorova	Russia	2:13.83	Q
3	2	4	Martina Rossi	Italy	2:14.84	Q
4	4	4	Giulia Ramatelli	Italy	2:15.82	Q
5	2	5	Maryna Kolesnykova	Ukraine	2:16.51	Q
6	4	3	Dalma Matyasovszky	Hungary	2:16.73	Q
7	3	6	Dorottya Dobos	Hungary	2:18.03	Q
8	2	6	Gabriela Bernat	Poland	2:18.59	Q
9	4	6	Ioanna Sacha	Greece	2:18.66	Q
10	4	5	Rebecca Sherwin	Great Britain	2:18.86	Q
11	4	7	Sara Rashid Taghipour	Austria	2:18.95	Q
12	3	3	Iris Tjonk	Netherlands	2:19.34	Q
13	2	1	Hanna Rosvall	Sweden	2:19.41	Q
14	3	2	Jana Augenstein	Germany	2:19.82	Q
15	2	3	Marieke Tienstra	Netherlands	2:19.84	Q
16	4	8	Eline van den Bossche	Luxembourg	2:19.97	Q
17	3	7	Julia Gus	Poland	2:19.99	
18	2	7	Gaja Kristan	Slovenia	2:20.08	
19	3	8	Jasmijn Boon	Netherlands	2:20.91	
20	4	0	Margaryta Bokan	Ukraine	2:21.31	
21	2	2	Danielle Hill	Ireland	2:21.41	
22	2	7	Boyana Tomova	Bulgaria	2:21.87	
23	2	8	Victoria Bierre	Denmark	2:24.05	
24	2	9	Vladyslava Maznytska	Ukraine	2:24.14	
25	3	1	Darya Douhal	Belarus	2:24.17	
26	3	0	Melek Ayarci	Finland	2:24.28	
27	3	9	Signhild Joensen	LEN ( Faroe Islands)	2:25.14	
28	1	4	Maria Bjarnastein Antoft	LEN ( Faroe Islands)	2:26.54	
29	2	0	Michaela Trnková	Czech Republic	2:26.56	
30	4	9	Arina Baikova	Latvia	2:28.08	
31	4	2	Ava Schollmayer	Slovenia	2:28.16	
32	1	6	Lamija Medošević	Bosnia and Herzegovina	2:29.59	
33	1	3	Yuliya Stisyuk	Azerbaijan	2:30.06	
34	1	5	Meda Kulbačiauskaitė	Lithuania	2:30.46	

=== Semifinals ===
The semifinals were started on 23 June at 18:53.

==== Semifinal 1 ====
Rank	Lane	Name	Nationality	Time	Notes
1	4	Polina Egorova	Russia	2:13.19	Q
2	5	Giulia Ramatelli	Italy	2:14.93	Q
3	2	Rebecca Sherwin	Great Britain	2:16.50	q
4	3	Dalma Matyasovszky	Hungary	2:16.65	q
5	7	Iris Tjonk	Netherlands	2:17.21	
6	6	Gabriela Bernat	Poland	2:17.47	
7	1	Hanna Rosvall	Sweden	2:18.35	
8	1	Jana Augenstein	Germany	2:23.09	

==== Semifinal 2 ====
Rank	Lane	Name	Nationality	Time	Notes
1	5	Martina Rossi	Italy	2:12.72	Q
2	4	Maxine Wolters	Germany	2:13.13	Q
3	3	Maryna Kolesnykova	Ukraine	2:14.20	q
4	2	Ioanna Sacha	Greece	2:16.63	q
5	8	Marieke Tienstra	Netherlands	2:17.41	
6	7	Sara Rashid Taghipour	Austria	2:18.24	
7	6	Dorottya Dobos	Hungary	2:18.25	
8	8	Eline van den Bossche	Luxembourg	2:21.22	

=== Final ===
The final was held on 24 June at 18:41.

Rank	Lane	Name	Nationality	Time	Notes
1st place, gold medalist(s)	3	Polina Egorova	Russia	2:11.23	GR
2nd place, silver medalist(s)	5	Maxine Wolters	Germany	2:11.38	
3rd place, bronze medalist(s)	6	Maryna Kolesnykova	Ukraine	2:11.91	
4	4	Martina Rossi	Italy	2:13.17	
5	2	Giulia Ramatelli	Italy	2:13.55	
6	8	Dalma Matyasovszky	Hungary	2:15.12	
7	7	Rebecca Sherwin	Great Britain	2:17.00	
8	1	Ioanna Sacha	Greece	2:18.75	
