= Swimming at the 2015 European Games – Women's 4 × 100 metre medley relay =

Women's 4 × 100 metre medley relay at the 2015 European Games
- Venue: Aquatic Palace
- Dates: 25 June
- Competitors: 73 from 16 nations
- Winning time: 4:03.22

Medalists
gold medal	Maria Kameneva; Maria Astashkina; Polina Egorova; Arina Openysheva; Daria Chikunova; Alexandra Chesnokova; Vasilissa Buinaia	Russia
silver medal	Iris Tjonk; Tes Schouten; Josein Wijkhuis; Marrit Steenbergen; Marieke Tienstra; Frederique Janssen	Netherlands
bronze medal	Rebecca Sherwin; Layla Black; Amelia Clynes; Georgia Coates; Emma Cain; Abbie Wood; Darcy Deakin	Great Britain

The women's 4 × 100 metre medley relay event at the 2015 European Games in Baku took place on 25 June at the Aquatic Palace.

== Results ==
=== Heats ===
The heats were started at 10:56.

Rank	Heat	Lane	Nation	Swimmers	Time	Notes
1	2	5	Russia	Polina Egorova (1:02.01) GR; Daria Chikunova (1:09.44); Alexandra Chesnokova (1:01.22); Vasilissa Buinaia (57.29)	4:09.96	Q, GR
2	1	5	Great Britain	Rebecca Sherwin (1:04.00); Emma Cain (1:10.63); Abbie Wood (1:01.06); Darcy Deakin (57.74)	4:13.43	Q
3	2	7	Germany	Maxine Wolters (1:04.03); Laura Kelsch (1:10.94); Jana Zinnecker (1:01.87); Hana van Loock (57.09)	4:13.93	Q
4	2	6	Netherlands	Marieke Tienstra (1:05.11); Tes Schouten (1:10.98); Josien Wijkhuijs (1:03.06); Frederique Janssen (57.48)	4:16.63	Q
5	1	2	Turkey	Sezin Eligül (1:06.76); Gülşen Beste Samancı (1:09.18); Yüksel Deniz Özkan (1:03.04); Zeynep Odabaşı (58.23)	4:17.21	Q
6	2	0	Italy	Martina Menotti (1:05.07); Giulia Verona (1:10.57); Tania Quaglieri (1:02.89); Camilla Tinelli (58.92)	4:17.45	Q
7	2	1	Slovenia	Ava Schollmayer (1:05.01); Tara Vovk (1:12.01); Diana Naglič (1:03.55); Neža Klančar (58.63)	4:19.20	Q
8	1	3	Ireland	Danielle Hill (1:06.29); Mona McSharry (1:11.55); Emma Reid (1:03.14); Rachel Bethel (58.58)	4:19.56	Q
9	2	3	Lithuania	Meda Kulbačiauskaitė (1:06.18); Agnė Šeleikaitė (1:11.26); Bena Sarapaitė (1:03.85); Diana Jaruševičiūtė (58.88)	4:20.17	
10	1	4	Finland	Eveliina Kallio (1:07.14); Sini Koivu (1:12.16); Sohvi Nenonen (1:02.88); Roosa Mört (58.55)	4:20.73	
11	2	4	Sweden	Lova Andersson (1:06.79); Sara Wallberg (1:12.42); Hanna Rosvall (1:02.70); Hanna Eriksson (1:00.85)	4:22.76	
12	1	6	Ukraine	Maryna Kolesnykova (1:03.76); Yuliya Gnidenko (1:14.51); Tetiana Kudako (1:06.14); Valeriia Timchenko (59.56)	4:23.97	
13	1	1	Austria	Caroline Pilhatsch (1:07.42); Annabelle Schwaiger (1:12.77); Caroline Hechenbichler (1:06.47); Cornelia Rott (58.59)	4:25.25	
14	1	8	Belarus	Darya Douhal (1:07.94); Viktoryia Mikhalap (1:12.35); Vasilisa Zeliankevich (1:05.01); Safiya Akhapkina (1:00.34)	4:25.64	
	2	2	Denmark	Victoria Bierre (1:05.13); Josefine Pedersen; Merete Toft Jensen; Julie Kepp Jensen	DSQ	
	2	8	Spain	Rosa Maeso (1:04.52); Paula García (1:10.04); Andrea Melendo (1:01.97); Marta Cano	DSQ	
	1	7	Iceland		DNS	

=== Final ===
The final was held at 20:05.

Rank	Lane	Nation	Swimmers	Time	Notes
1st place, gold medalist(s)	4	Russia	Maria Kameneva (1:01.39) GR; Maria Astashkina (1:07.61); Polina Egorova (59.64); Arina Openysheva (54.58)	4:03.22	GR, WJR
2nd place, silver medalist(s)	6	Netherlands	Iris Tjonk (1:02.82); Tes Schouten (1:10.79); Josein Wijkhuis (1:01.35); Marrit Steenbergen (53.03)	4:07.99	
3rd place, bronze medalist(s)	5	Great Britain	Rebecca Sherwin (1:03.84); Layla Black (1:09.26); Amelia Clynes (1:00.11); Georgia Coates (55.89)	4:09.10	
4	3	Germany	Maxine Wolters (1:01.70); Laura Kelsch (1:11.07); Jana Zinnecker (1:01.19); Katrin Gottwald (55.43)	4:09.39	
5	7	Italy	Martina Menotti (1:05.67); Giulia Verona (1:09.35); Tania Quaglieri (1:03.23); Camilla Tinelli (58.03)	4:16.28	
6	8	Ireland	Danielle Hill (1:04.92); Mona McSharry (1:11.35); Emma Reid (1:02.79); Rachel Bethel (57.75)	4:16.81	
7	1	Slovenia	Ava Schollmayer (1:04.89); Tara Vovk (1:12.05); Diana Naglič (1:02.03); Neža Klančar (57.92)	4:16.89	
8	2	Turkey	Sezin Eligül (1:06.39); Gülşen Beste Samancı (1:09.73); Yüksel Deniz Özkan (1:03.24); Zeynep Odabaşı (57.93)	4:17.29	
