= Swimming at the 2015 European Games – Mixed 4 × 100 metre medley relay =

Mixed 4 × 100 metre medley relay at the 2015 European Games
- Venue: Aquatic Palace
- Dates: 26 June
- Competitors: 85 from 17 nations
- Winning time: 3:49.53

Medalists
gold medal	Mariia Kameneva; Anton Chupkov; Daniil Pakhomov; Arina Openysheva; Filip Shopin; Daria Chikunova; Roman Shevliakov; Vasilissa Buinaia	Russia
silver medal	Luke Greenbank; Charlie Attwood; Amelia Clynes; Georgia Coates; Joe Litchfield; Luke Davies; Abbie Wood; Hannah Featherstone	Great Britain
bronze medal	Maxine Wolters; Leo Schmidt; Johannes Tesch; Katrin Gottwald; Marek Ulrich; Laura Kelsch; Hana van Loock	Germany

The mixed 4 × 100 metre medley relay event at the 2015 European Games in Baku took place on 26 June at the Aquatic Palace.

== Results ==
=== Heats ===
The heats were started at 11:18.

Rank	Heat	Lane	Nation	Swimmers	Time	Notes
1	2	2	Russia	Filipp Shopin (55.33); Daria Chikunova (1:09.88); Roman Shevliakov (53.30); Vasilissa Buinaia (57.63)	3:56.14	Q, GR
2	1	8	Germany	Marek Ulrich (55.35); Laura Kelsch (1:11.31); Johannes Tesch (54.21); Hana van Loock (56.55)	3:57.42	Q
3	2	1	Great Britain	Joe Litchfield (56.73); Luke Davies (1:03.00); Abbie Wood (1:01.55); Hannah Featherstone (56.97)	3:58.25	Q
4	2	5	France	Pauline Mahieu (1:03.04); Nolwenn Hervé (1:11.36); Guillaume Garzotto (56.23); Maxime Cadiat (51.03)	4:01.66	Q
5	1	0	Poland	Gabriela Bernat (1:05.93); Janusz Arentewicz (1:04.16); Michał Chudy (53.80); Magdalena Roman (58.66)	4:02.55	Q
6	1	7	Turkey	Berk Özkul (58.50); Beste Samancı (1:11.01); Yüksel Deniz Özkan (1:03.51); Emre Sakçı (50.63)	4:03.65	Q
7	1	2	Hungary	Dominik Varga (57.31); Zsófia Leitner (1:13.21); Boglárka Bonecz (1:03.42); Ármin Reményi (50.88)	4:04.82	Q
8	1	1	Italy	Martina Rossi (1:03.55); Federico Poggio (1:07.63); Christian Ferraro (55.24); Camilla Tinelli (58.57)	4:04.99	Q
9	1	5	Czech Republic	Tomáš Franta (59.12); Jakub Březina (1:06.01); Edita Chrápavá (1:02.75); Barbora Seemanová (57.17)	4:05.05	
10	1	3	Finland	Christoffer Fredrikson (57.80); Sini Koivu (1:12.15); Niko Makela (56.79); Aino Otava (59.16)	4:05.90	
11	2	4	Ukraine	Vladyslava Maznytska (1:04.66); Yevgen Kurkin (1:04.04); Tetiana Kudako (1:06.59); Ivan Denysenko (50.96)	4:06.25	
12	1	4	Switzerland	Timothy Schlatter (1:00.45); Jacques Läuffer (1:04.78); Olivia Sindico (1:04.04); Zoe Preisig (58.15)	4:07.42	
13	1	6	Belarus	Darya Douhal (1:06.74); Viktoryia Mikhalap (1:13.28); Pavel Bashura (57.32); Hryhory Pekarski (52.22)	4:09.56	
14	2	7	Moldova	Adrian Negru (1:01.15); Alexandra Vinicenco (1:13.03); Vlas Cononov (57.09); Ana Cosmina (1:00.96)	4:12.23	
	2	0	Azerbaijan	Yuliya Stisyuk (1:10.35); Anton Jeltyakov; Alsu Bayramova; Ivan Andrianov	DSQ	
	2	3	Norway	Marius Solaat Rødland; Ariel Braathen; Sigurd Holten Bøen; Marte Løvberg	DSQ	
	2	6	Austria	Caroline Pilhatsch (1:05.23); Christopher Rothbauer (1:03.22); Caroline Hechenbichler (1:03.64); Robin Grünberger	DSQ	
	2	8	Greece		DNS	

=== Final ===
The final was held at 19:46.

Rank	Lane	Nation	Swimmers	Time	Notes
1st place, gold medalist(s)	4	Russia	Mariia Kameneva (1:01.85); Anton Chupkov (1:00.42); Daniil Pakhomov (52.04); Arina Openysheva (55.22)	3:49.53	GR
2nd place, silver medalist(s)	3	Great Britain	Luke Greenbank (54.86); Charlie Attwood (1:00.78); Amelia Clynes (1:00.85); Georgia Coates (55.54)	3:52.03	
3rd place, bronze medalist(s)	5	Germany	Maxine Wolters (1:01.48); Leo Schmidt (1:02.66); Johannes Tesch (53.81); Katrin Gottwald (56.32)	3:54.27	
4	8	Italy	Martina Rossi (1:03.50); Giulia Verona (1:10.62); Giacomo Carini (53.18); Alessandro Miressi (48.87)	3:56.17	
5	6	France	Pauline Mahieu (1:02.28); Nolwenn Hervé (1:10.19); Guillaume Garzotto (56.00); Maxime Cadiat (50.83)	3:59.30	
6	7	Turkey	Berk Özkul (57.75); Beste Samancı (1:11.71); Erge Can Gezmiş (55.32); Zeynep Odabaşı (58.84)	4:03.62	
7	1	Hungary	Dominik Varga (57.10); Zsófia Leitner (1:13.48); Boglárka Bonecz (1:02.47); Ármin Reményi (50.97)	4:04.02	
	2	Poland	Julia Gus (1:04.47); Janusz Arentewicz; Michał Chudy; Magdalena Roman	DSQ	
