= Swimming at the 2013 European Youth Summer Olympic Festival =

Swimming competition

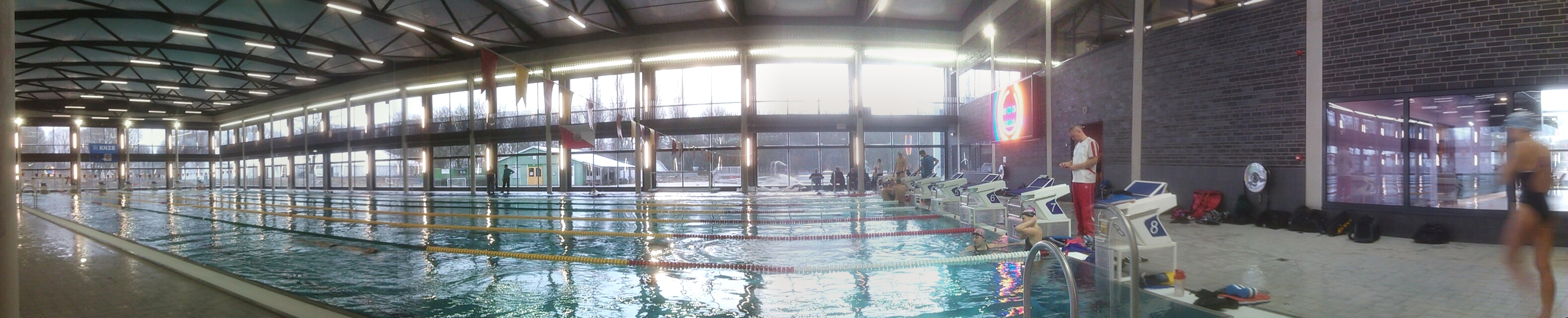
Krommerijnbad Utrecht. Here the EYOF 2013 Swimming was held.

Swimming at the 2013 European Youth Summer Olympic Festival was held from 16 to 19 July 2013. The competitions took place in swimming pool De Krommerijn in Utrecht, that was rebuilt in 2012. A temporary pool was created for training and warming up, which was covered by a tent.

Pieter van den Hoogenband was the tournament director

On the four competition days there were series in the mornings, and finals in the afternoon.

== Medal events ==
=== Boys' events ===
Games	Gold		Silver		Bronze	
50m Freestyle	Marek Ulrich; Germany	23.23	Arseniy Badamshin; Russia	23.43	Alessandro Bori; Italy	23.53
100m Freestyle	Alessandro Bori; Italy	50.73	Arseniy Badamshin; Russia	51.15	Marius Solaat Roedland; Norway	51.68
200m Freestyle	Hendrik Ulrich; Germany	1:51.29	Ernest Maksumov; Russia	1:52.93	Marc Vivas Egea; Spain	1:52.96
400m Freestyle	Marc Hinnawi; Israel	3:57.73	Ernest Maksumov; Russia	3:58.44	Guillem Pujol Belmonte; Spain	3:58.53
1500m Freestyle	Marc Hinnawi; Israel	15:33.72	Nicolas D'Oriano; France	15:39.66	Andrea Manzi; Italy	15:46.49
100m Backstroke	Filipp Shopin; Russia	56.54	Andriy Khloptsov; Ukraine	56.59	Robert Glință; Romania	56.65
200m Backstroke	Petter Fredriksson; Sweden	2:04.69	Dominik Varga; Hungary	2:05.01	Ziv Kalontarov; Israel	2:05.78
100m Breaststroke	Charlie Atwood; Great Britain	1:03.19	Anton Chupkov; Russia	1:03.26	Nikola Obrovac; Croatia	1:03.86
200m Breaststroke	Anton Chupkov; Russia	2:15.30	Jacques Laeuffer; Switzerland	2:18.45	Charlie Attwood; Great Britain	2:18.47
100m Butterfly	Matteo Masiero; Italy	55.37	Johannes Tesch; Germany	55.53	Alberto Lozano Mateos; Spain	55.54
200m Butterfly	Giacomo Carini; Italy	2:01.41	Athanasios-Charalampos Kynigakis; Greece	2:02.90	Dmitriy Malkov; Russia	2:03.89
200m Medley	Duncan Scott; Great Britain	2:04.90	Joan Casanovas Skoubo; Spain	2:05.85	Igor Balyberdin; Russia	2:05.97
400m Medley	Igor Balyberdin; Russia	4:24.82	Duncan Scott; Great Britain	4:26.28	Joan Casanovas Skoubo; Spain	4:26.63
4 × 100 m Freestyle Relay	Russia; Arseniy Badamshin (52.41); Elisey Stepanov (51.49); Filipp Shopin (51.86); Ernest Maksumov (51.52)	3:27.28	Germany; Marek Ulrich (51.78); Franz Mueller (52.93); Alexander Lohmar (51.89); Hendrik Ulrich (51.30)	3:27.90	Great Britain; Martyn Walton (52.55); Duncan Scott (51.31); Lewis Clough (52.68); Suleman Butt (51.44)	3:27.98
4 × 100 m Medley Relay	Russia; Filipp Shopin (58.01); Anton Chupkov (1:01.77); Dmitriy Malkov (55.59); Arseniy Badamshin (51.03)	3:46.40	Italy; Lorenzo Glessi (58.36); Alex Baldisseri (1:04.24); Matteo Masiero (54.99); Alessandro Bori (50.42)	3:48.01	Ukraine; Andriy Khloptsov (58.48); Yevgen Kurkin (1:03.69); Dmytro Prozhoga (55.63); Viacheslav Ohnov (51.70)	3:51.02
NYR = national youth record | NRU17 = national record under 17 years | NR16 = national record aged 16 | NR15 = national record aged 15

=== Girls' events ===
Games	Gold		Silver		Bronze	
50m Freestyle	Roosa Moert; Finland	26.23	Marrit Steenbergen; Netherlands	26.47	Neta Kocijan; Slovenia	26.81
100m Freestyle	Arina Openysheva; Russia	55.81	Marrit Steenbergen; Netherlands	57.81	Marta Cano Minarro; Spain	57.82
200m Freestyle	Arina Openysheva; Russia	2:03.50	Holly Hibbott; Great Britain	2:04.49	Alessia Ruggi; Germany	2:05.11
400m Freestyle	Arina Openysheva; Russia	4:17.07	Paula Ruiz Bravo; Spain	4:19.15	Valeriia Timchenko; Ukraine	4:20.37
800m Freestyle	Arina Openysheva; Russia	8:49.88	Holly Hibbott; Great Britain	8:50.01	Sveva Schiazzano; Italy	8:58.48
100m Backstroke	Dalma Matyasovszky; Hungary	1:02.60	Iris Tjonk; Netherlands	1:02.76	Maryna Kolesnykova; Ukraine	1:02.93
200m Backstroke	Dalma Matyasovszky; Hungary	2:13.71	Polina Egorova; Russia	2:15.12	Holly Hibbott; Great Britain	2:16.12
100m Breaststroke	Beste Samanci; Turkey	1:10.96	Ekaterina Levashova; Russia	1:11.21	Eleonora Clerici; Italy	1:11.72
200m Breaststroke	Abbie Wood; Great Britain	2:32.87	Tetiana Kudako; Ukraine	2:33.35	Beste Samanci; Turkey	2:33.55
100m Butterfly	Aleksandra Chesnokova; Russia	1:00.53	Laura Stephens; Great Britain	1:02.22	Iuliia Stadnik; Ukraine	1:02.60
200m Butterfly	Carmen Balbuena Heredia; Spain	2:15.98	Laura Stephens; Great Britain	2:17.24	Marina Luperi; Italy	2:17.27
200m Medley	Greta Szilvasi; Hungary	2:19.32	Abbie Wood; Great Britain	2:19.46	Rosa Maria Maeso Valdes; Spain	2:19.86
400m Medley	Abbie Wood; Great Britain	4:51.53	Diana Sheludchenko; Russia	4:56.23	Dora Sztankovics; Hungary	4:59.73
4 × 100 m Freestyle Relay	Russia; Daria Shibarova (58.29); Aleksandra Chesnokova (59.01); Polina Egorova (57.72); Arina Openysheva (56.28)	3:51.30	Germany; Katrin Gottwald (58.27); Leonie Kullmann (57.98); Lia Neubert (58.88); Anabel Ivanov (57.82)	3:52.95	Great Britain; Darcy Deakin (58.38); Rebecca Dalling (58.35); Georgia Coates (58.26); Bethany Newton (58.57)	3:53.74
4 × 100 m Medley Relay	Russia; Polina Egorova (1:03.28); Ekaterina Levashova (1:12.30); Aleksandra Chesnokova (1:00.47); Arina Openysheva (56.48)	4:12.53	Great Britain; Bethany Newton (1:04.65); Abbie Wood (1:11.75); Laura Stephens (1:01.92); Hannah Fatherstone (58.09)	4:16.41	Spain; Laura Pareja Prieto (1:05.23); Rosa Maria Maeso Valdes (1:14.26); Carmen Balbuena Heredia (1:02.42); Marta Cano Minarro (58.03)	4:19.94
NR = national record | NYR = national youth record | NR14 = national record aged 14

=== Mixed events ===
Games	Gold		Silver		Bronze	
4 × 100 m Freestyle Relay	Russia; Elisey Stepanov (52.12); Polina Egorova (57.70); Arseniy Badamshin (51.26); Arina Openysheva (56.30)	3:37.38	Great Britain; Duncan Scott (51.58); Darcy Deakin (58.69); Suleman Butt (51.53); Hannah Featherstone (57.66)	3:39.46	Germany; Hendrik Ulrich (52.24); Katrin Gottwald (57.64); Marek Ulrich (51.67); Anabel Ivanov (58.19)	3:39.74
4 × 100 m Medley Relay	Russia; Filipp Shopin (57.45); Ekaterina Levashova (1:11.50); Daniil Antipov (55.39); Arina Openysheva (55.59)	3:59.93	Germany; Hendrik Ulrich (57.85); Leonie Huegenell (1:13:90); Paulus Schoen (55.22); Anabel Ivanov (58.05)	4:05.02	Ukraine; Andriy Khloptsov (57.79); Tetiana Kudako (1:13.62); Dmytro Prozhoga (55.65); Anastasiia Manakova (58.60)	4:05.66
