= Swimming at the 2015 European Games – Mixed 4 × 100 metre freestyle relay =

Mixed 4 × 100 metre freestyle relay at the 2015 European Games
- Venue: Aquatic Palace
- Dates: 24 June
- Competitors: 64 from 13 nations
- Winning time: 3:30.30

Medalists
gold medal	Vladislav Kozlov; Elisei Stepanov; Maria Kameneva; Arina Openysheva; Igor Shadrin; Aleksei Brianskiy; Vasilissa Buinaia; Olesia Cherniatina	Russia
silver medal	Duncan Scott; Martyn Walton; Darcy Deakin; Georgia Coates; Cameron Kurle; Madeleine Crompton; Daniel Speers; Hannah Featherstone	Great Britain
bronze medal	Alexander Lohmar; Leonie Kullmann; Katrin Gottwald; Konstantin Walter; Hana van Loock	Germany

The mixed 4 × 100 metre freestyle relay event at the 2015 European Games in Baku took place on 24 June at the Aquatic Palace.

== Results ==
=== Heats ===
The heats were started at 11:05.

Rank	Heat	Lane	Nation	Swimmers	Time	Notes
1	2	7	Germany	Alexander Lohmar (51.03); Katrin Gottwald (56.33); Hana van Loock (56.71); Konstantin Walter (52.01)	3:36.08	Q, GR
2	1	5	Russia	Igor Shadrin (51.00); Aleksei Brianskiy (50.57); Vasilissa Buinaia (57.20); Olesia Cherniatina (57.59)	3:36.36	Q
3	2	5	Italy	Manuel Frigo (51.34); Alessio Proietti Colonna (50.26); Ilaria Cusinato (57.76); Camilla Tinelli (58.52)	3:37.88	Q
4	1	7	Great Britain	Cameron Kurle (51.64); Madeleine Crompton (58.61); Daniel Speers (51.82); Hannah Featherstone (56.59)	3:38.66	Q
5	2	3	France	Guillaume Garzotto (51.42); Maxime Cadiat (50.98); Pauline Mahieu (57.63); Léa Marchal (59.20)	3:39.23	Q
6	1	3	Poland	Michał Brzuś (51.64); Magdalena Roman (58.31); Adrianna Niewiadomska (58.79); Michał Chudy (50.79)	3:39.53	Q
7	1	6	Estonia	Daniel Zaitsev (50.71); Cevin Siim (51.75); Margaret Markvardt (58.92); Kertu Ly Alnek (58.45)	3:39.83	Q
8	1	1	Turkey	Erge Gezmis (51.68); Kaan Özcan (52.47); Sezin Eligül (57.70); Zeynep Odabaşı (58.85)	3:40.70	Q
9	1	4	Austria	Filip Milcevic (52.19); Lena Opatril (58.66); Caroline Hechenbichler (59.24); Robin Grünberger (51.09)	3:41.18	
10	2	2	Ukraine	Ivan Denysenko (52.34); Valeriia Timchenko (59.54); Margaryta Bokan (59.98); Viacheslav Ohnov (51.02)	3:42.88	
11	2	4	Switzerland	Manuel Leuthard (52.10); Olivier Petignat (52.44); Zoe Preisig (58.31); Rebecca Peto (1:00.73)	3:43.58	
12	2	6	Hungary	Oszkár Lavotha (52.49); Janka Juhász (1:00.18); Zsófia Leitner (1:00.64); Ármin Reményi (50.94)	3:44.25	
13	2	1	Azerbaijan	Dorian Fazekas (54.07); Alsu Bayramova (1:02.80); Anna Manchenkova (1:04.16); Ivan Andrianov (52.36)	3:53.39	
	2	2	Greece		DNS	

=== Final ===
The final was held at 19:52.

Rank	Lane	Nation	Swimmers	Time	Notes
1st place, gold medalist(s)	5	Russia	Vladislav Kozlov (50.07); Elisei Stepanov (50.25); Maria Kameneva (55.07); Arina Openysheva (54.91)	3:30.30	GR
2nd place, silver medalist(s)	6	Great Britain	Duncan Scott (49.59); Martyn Walton (50.37); Darcy Deakin (56.51); Georgia Coates (56.18)	3:32.65	
3rd place, bronze medalist(s)	4	Germany	Alexander Lohmar (51.23); Leonie Kullmann (56.39); Katrin Gottwald (55.77); Konstantin Walter (50.35)	3:33.74	
4	3	Italy	Alessandro Bori (50.77); Alessandro Miressi (49.62); Camilla Tinelli (57.92); Ilaria Cusinato (57.33)	3:35.64	
5	2	France	Guillaume Garzotto (51.43); Maxime Cadiat (50.34); Pauline Mahieu (57.34); Léa Marchal (58.48)	3:37.59	
6	1	Estonia	Daniel Zaitsev (50.80); Cevin Siim (51.23); Margaret Markvardt (58.55); Kertu Ly Alnek (57.74)	3:38.32	
7	8	Turkey	Erge Gezmis (51.49); Kaan Özcan (51.67); Sezin Eligül (57.23); Zeynep Odabaşı (58.35)	3:38.74	
	7	Poland	Michał Brzuś (51.58); Magdalena Roman (57.58); Adrianna Niewiadomska (58.27); Paweł Sendyk	DSQ	
