= Swimming at the 2015 European Games – Men's 1500 metre freestyle =

Men's 1500 metre freestyle at the 2015 European Games
- Venue: Aquatic Palace
- Dates: 24 June
- Competitors: 23 from 17 nations
- Winning time: 15:13.31

Medalists
gold medal	Nicolas D'Oriano	France
silver medal	Ernest Maksumov	Russia
bronze medal	Marc Hinawi	Israel

The men's 1500 metre freestyle event at the 2015 European Games took place on 24 June at the Aquatic Palace in Baku.

== Results ==
The heats were started at 11:16 and 19:16.

Rank	Heat	Lane	Name	Nationality	Time	Notes
1st place, gold medalist(s)	3	3	Nicolas D'Oriano	France	15:13.31	GR
2nd place, silver medalist(s)	3	6	Ernest Maksumov	Russia	15:13.90	
3rd place, bronze medalist(s)	3	7	Marc Hinawi	Israel	15:25.63	
4	3	2	Ilya Druzhinin	Russia	15:26.33	
5	2	5	Kristóf Rasovszky	Hungary	15:28.13	
6	3	8	Henning Mühlleitner	Germany	15:32.05	
7	2	4	Marcos Rodríguez	Spain	15:32.09	
8	3	5	Tom Derbyshire	Great Britain	15:39.19	
9	3	4	Thore Bermel	Germany	15:43.12	
10	3	1	Lukas Ambros	Austria	15:43.26	
11	2	1	Bogdan Scarlat	Romania	15:45.90	
12	2	3	Wiktor Jaszczak	Poland	15:45.92	
13	2	6	Alexandre Coutinho	Portugal	15:46.58	
14	2	8	Guilherme Pina	Portugal	15:49.04	
15	2	0	Erik Årsland Gidskehaug	Norway	15:52.85	
16	2	7	Adam Staniszewski	Poland	15:57.61	
17	1	5	Frederik Jessen	Denmark	15:58.35	
18	2	9	Grega Popović	Slovenia	16:02.06	
19	2	2	Victor Johansson	Sweden	16:03.41	
20	1	4	Bogdan Petre	Romania	16:07.83	
21	1	2	Marius Ihlen Gardshodn	LEN ( Faroe Islands)	16:17.70	
22	1	3	Juho Grönblom	Finland	16:25.13	
23	1	6	Eivind Bjelland	Norway	16:28.40	
