= Swimming at the 2015 European Games – Women's 4 × 200 metre freestyle relay =

Women's 4 × 200 metre freestyle relay at the 2015 European Games
- Venue: Aquatic Palace
- Dates: 27 June
- Competitors: 42 from 9 nations
- Winning time: 8:03.45

Medalists
gold medal	Anastasiya Kirpichnikova; Arina Openysheva; Olesia Cherniatina; Irina Krivonogova; Maria Kameneva; Mariana Petrova	Russia
silver medal	Laura van Engelen; Frederique Janssen; Marieke Tienstra; Marrit Steenbergen	Netherlands
bronze medal	Hannah Featherstone; Darcy Deakin; Holly Hibbott; Georgia Coates; Madeleine Crompton	Great Britain

The women's 4 × 200 metre freestyle relay event at the 2015 European Games in Baku took place on 27 June at the Aquatic Palace.

== Results ==
=== Heats ===
The heats were started at 10:22.

Rank	Heat	Lane	Nation	Swimmers	Time	Notes
1	1	3	Great Britain	Holly Hibbott (2:02.81); Madeleine Crompton (2:06.16); Hannah Featherstone (2:02.69); Darcy Deakin (2:03.10)	8:14.76	Q, GR
2	1	4	Germany	Leonie Kullmann (2:02.65); Josephine Tesch (2:04.78); Lia Neubert (2:04.07); Katrin Gottwald (2:04.08)	8:15.58	Q
3	2	3	Netherlands	Frederique Janssen (2:05.31); Laura van Engelen (2:03.37); Marieke Tienstra (2:04.58); Marrit Steenbergen (2:03.74)	8:17.00	Q
4	2	4	Spain	Carmen San Nicolás (2:04.64); Marta Cano (2:02.85); Esther Huete (2:05.13); Paula Ruiz (2:04.72)	8:17.34	Q
5	1	5	Italy	Elisa Scarpa Vidal (2:05.11); Giovanna La Cava (2:04.26); Sveva Schiazzano (2:06.07); Anna Pirovano (2:05.45)	8:20.89	Q
6	1	6	Russia	Maria Kameneva (2:06.40); Olesia Cherniatina (2:04.92); Mariana Petrova (2:08.19); Irina Krivonogova (2:02.92)	8:22.43	Q
7	2	6	Denmark	Josephine Holm (2:06.29); Emily Gantriis (2:06.24); Signe Bro (2:07.11); Trine Kjøngerskov (2:08.43)	8:28.07	Q
8	2	5	Austria	Lena Opatril (2:06.47); Sara Rashid Taghipour (2:09.46); Esther Uhl (2:08.68); Caroline Hechenbichler (2:07.98)	8:32.59	Q
9	2	7	Finland	Nea-Amanda Heinola (2:10.64); Essi-Maria Lillman (2:09.22); Julia Bruneau (2:10.94); Melek Ayarci (2:09.80)	8:40.60	
	2	2	Turkey		DNS	

=== Final ===
The final was held at 19:26.

Rank	Lane	Nation	Swimmers	Time	Notes
1st place, gold medalist(s)	7	Russia	Anastasiya Kirpichnikova (2:01.54); Arina Openysheva (1:58.04); Olesia Cherniatina (2:02.82); Irina Krivonogova (2:01.05)	8:03.45	GR
2nd place, silver medalist(s)	3	Netherlands	Laura van Engelen (2:01.39); Frederique Janssen (2:03.27); Marieke Tienstra (2:01.95); Marrit Steenbergen (1:58.04)	8:04.65	
3rd place, bronze medalist(s)	4	Great Britain	Hannah Featherstone (2:02.85); Darcy Deakin (2:01.76); Holly Hibbott (2:00.34); Georgia Coates (1:59.89)	8:04.84	
4	5	Germany	Leonie Kullmann (2:01.23); Josephine Tesch (2:02.18); Maxine Wolters (2:02.81); Katrin Gottwald (2:01.53)	8:07.75	
5	2	Italy	Giovanna La Cava (2:04.84); Elisa Scarpa Vidal (2:05.01); Ilaria Cusinato (2:03.32); Anna Pirovano (2:03.06)	8:16.23	
6	6	Spain	Marta Cano (2:02.52); Carmen San Nicolás (2:03.53); Marina Castro (2:05.18); Paula Ruiz (2:06.33)	8:17.56	
7	1	Denmark	Emily Gantriis (2:06.82); Signe Bro (2:04.93); Trine Kjøngerskov (2:07.53); Josephine Holm (2:06.60)	8:25.88	
8	8	Austria	Lena Opatril (2:05.68); Sara Rashid Taghipour (2:08.75); Esther Uhl (2:09.00); Caroline Hechenbichler (2:09.09)	8:32.52	
