= Faroe Islands at the 2015 European Games =

- IOC code: FRO

in Baku, Azerbaijan 12 – 28 June 2015
- Competitors: 5 (as Ligue Européenne de Natation)
- Medals: Gold 0 Silver 0 Bronze 0 Total 0

European Games appearances
- 2015; 2019–2023; 2027

Faroe Islands participated at the 2015 European Games, in Baku, Azerbaijan from 12 to 28 June 2015. Since the Faroe Islands are not members of the European Olympic Committee, the Faroese participants took part under the Ligue Européenne de Natation in the swimming contests.

== Swimming ==
Men

| Athlete | Event | Heat | | Semifinals | | Final | |
| Athlete | Event | Time | Rank | Time | Rank | Time | Rank |
|---|---|---|---|---|---|---|---|
| Marius Gardshodn | 200 metre freestyle | 1:59.41 | 51 | Did not advance | | | |
| Marius Gardshodn | 400 metre freestyle | 4:10.00 | 47 | Did not advance | | | |
| Marius Gardshodn | 1500 metre freestyle | N/A | | | | 16:17.70 | 21 |

Women

| Athlete | Event | Heat | | Semifinals | | Final | |
| Athlete | Event | Time | Rank | Time | Rank | Time | Rank |
|---|---|---|---|---|---|---|---|
| Maria Antoft | 50 metre backstroke | 31.78 | 43 | Did not advance | | | |
| Maria Antoft | 100 metre backstroke | 1:08.80 | 35 | Did not advance | | | |
| Maria Antoft | 200 metre backstroke | 2:26.54 | 28 | Did not advance | | | |
| Liv Eidesgaard | 50 metre freestyle | 28.12 | 53 | Did not advance | | | |
| Liv Eidesgaard | 100 metre freestyle | 1:02.33 | 62 | Did not advance | | | |
| Liv Eidesgaard | 50 metre butterfly | 30.01 | 47 | Did not advance | | | |
| Asbjorg Hjelm | 50 metre breaststroke | 35.10 | 32 | Did not advance | | | |
| Asbjorg Hjelm | 100 metre breaststroke | 1:15.34 | 33 | Did not advance | | | |
| Asbjorg Hjelm | 200 metre breaststroke | 2:50.90 | 32 | Did not advance | | | |
| Signhild Joensen | 50 metre backstroke | 31.42 | 41 | Did not advance | | | |
| Signhild Joensen | 100 metre backstroke | 1:06.90 | 31 | Did not advance | | | |
| Signhild Joensen | 200 metre backstroke | 2:25.14 | 27 | Did not advance | | | |
