= 2014 FINA World Swimming Championships (25 m) – Women's 50 metre backstroke =

Women's 50 metre backstroke at the 2014 FINA World Swimming Championships (25 m)
- Dates: 6 December (heats and semifinals); 7 December (final)
- Competitors: 69 from 52 nations
- Winning time: 25.67

Medalists
| gold medal | Etiene Medeiros | Brazil |
| silver medal | Emily Seebohm | Australia |
| bronze medal | Katinka Hosszú | Hungary |

The women's 50 metre backstroke competition of the 2014 FINA World Swimming Championships (25 m) was held on 6 December with the heats and the semifinals and 7 December with the final.

== Records ==
Prior to the competition, the existing world and championship records were as follows.

| | Name | Nation | Time | Location | Date |
|---|---|---|---|---|---|
| World record | Sanja Jovanović | Croatia | 25.70 | Istanbul | 12 December 2009 |
| Championship record | Zhao Jing | China | 25.95 | Istanbul | 16 December 2012 |

The following records were established during the competition:

| Date | Event | Name | Nation | Time | Record |
|---|---|---|---|---|---|
| 6 December | Semifinals | Emily Seebohm | Australia | 25.87 | CR |
| 6 December | Final | Etiene Medeiros | Brazil | 25.67 | WR, CR |

== Results ==
=== Heats ===
The heats were held at 09:38.

| Rank | Heat | Lane | Name | Nationality | Time | Notes |
|---|---|---|---|---|---|---|
| 1 | 7 | 4 | Emily Seebohm | Australia | 26.07 | Q |
| 2 | 8 | 4 | Katinka Hosszú | Hungary | 26.45 | Q |
| 3 | 7 | 5 | Aleksandra Urbanczyk | Poland | 26.54 | Q |
| 3 | 8 | 3 | Felicia Lee | United States | 26.54 | Q |
| 5 | 7 | 6 | Daryna Zevina | Ukraine | 26.62 | Q |
| 6 | 6 | 6 | Simona Baumrtová | Czech Republic | 26.63 | Q |
| 7 | 7 | 3 | Georgia Davies | Great Britain | 26.67 | Q |
| 8 | 7 | 7 | Shiho Sakai | Japan | 26.74 | Q |
| 9 | 6 | 4 | Etiene Medeiros | Brazil | 27.06 | Q |
| 10 | 8 | 5 | Mie Nielsen | Denmark | 27.09 | Q |
| 11 | 8 | 6 | Madison Wilson | Australia | 27.13 | Q |
| 12 | 4 | 5 | Amy Bilquist | United States | 27.17 | Q |
| 13 | 8 | 1 | Stephanie Au | Hong Kong | 27.22 | Q |
| 14 | 6 | 8 | Yekaterina Rudenko | Kazakhstan | 27.26 | Q |
| 15 | 6 | 0 | Arianna Barbieri | Italy | 27.28 | Q |
| 16 | 6 | 3 | Michelle Coleman | Sweden | 27.30 | Q |
| 17 | 7 | 1 | Mathilde Cini | France | 27.31 | |
| 18 | 8 | 9 | Carolina Colorado Henao | Colombia | 27.35 | |
| 19 | 6 | 7 | Daria Ustinova | Russia | 27.41 | |
| 19 | 8 | 7 | Sanja Jovanović | Croatia | 27.41 | |
| 21 | 6 | 5 | Qiu Yuhan | China | 27.45 | |
| 22 | 6 | 2 | Wang Xueer | China | 27.50 | |
| 23 | 5 | 5 | Isabella Arcila | Colombia | 27.62 | |
| 24 | 5 | 7 | Ekaterina Avramova | Turkey | 27.64 | |
| 25 | 7 | 9 | Mimosa Jallow | Finland | 27.66 | |
| 26 | 6 | 9 | Hilary Caldwell | Canada | 27.80 | |
| 27 | 8 | 8 | Eygló Ósk Gústafsdóttir | Iceland | 27.82 | |
| 28 | 7 | 2 | Sayaka Akase | Japan | 27.84 | |
| 29 | 5 | 4 | Ida Lindborg | Sweden | 27.88 | |
| 30 | 6 | 1 | Anni Alitalo | Finland | 27.93 | |
| 31 | 8 | 0 | Duane Da Rocha | Spain | 28.03 | |
| 32 | 5 | 8 | Erin Gallagher | South Africa | 28.04 | |
| 33 | 5 | 6 | Genevieve Cantin | Canada | 28.12 | |
| 34 | 5 | 2 | Tereza Grusová | Czech Republic | 28.36 | |
| 35 | 5 | 3 | Karolina Hájková | Slovakia | 28.57 | |
| 36 | 7 | 0 | Anastasiia Osipenko | Russia | 28.64 | |
| 37 | 5 | 9 | Zanre Oberholzer | Namibia | 28.80 | |
| 38 | 5 | 1 | Sezin Eligül | Turkey | 28.85 | |
| 39 | 4 | 6 | Anna Schegoleva | Cyprus | 28.86 | |
| 40 | 4 | 1 | Araya Wongvat | Thailand | 29.35 | |
| 41 | 4 | 9 | Ajna Késely | Hungary | 29.42 | |
| 42 | 5 | 0 | Parita Damrongrat | Thailand | 29.55 | |
| 43 | 4 | 4 | Joyce Tafatatha | Malawi | 29.82 | |
| 43 | 4 | 2 | Lauren Hew | Cayman Islands | 29.82 | |
| 45 | 7 | 8 | Alexus Laird | Seychelles | 30.31 | |
| 46 | 3 | 6 | Evelina Afoa | Samoa | 30.39 | |
| 47 | 4 | 3 | Lara Butler | Cayman Islands | 30.46 | |
| 48 | 4 | 7 | Roxanne Yu | Philippines | 30.80 | |
| 49 | 3 | 2 | Chiara Gualtieri | San Marino | 30.82 | |
| 50 | 3 | 3 | Talisa Lanoe | Kenya | 30.98 | |
| 50 | 3 | 1 | Anna-Liza Mopio-Jane | Papua New Guinea | 30.98 | |
| 52 | 3 | 4 | Deandre Small | Barbados | 31.44 | |
| 53 | 3 | 5 | Ariana Herranz | Philippines | 31.45 | |
| 54 | 3 | 7 | Shanice Paraka | Papua New Guinea | 31.58 | |
| 55 | 4 | 8 | Maeform Borriello | Honduras | 31.80 | |
| 56 | 3 | 0 | Jamaris Washshah | United States Virgin Islands | 31.86 | |
| 57 | 3 | 8 | Yuliya Stisyuk | Azerbaijan | 32.10 | |
| 58 | 3 | 9 | Irene Prescott | Tonga | 33.20 | |
| 59 | 2 | 5 | Areeba Shaikh | Pakistan | 33.55 | |
| 60 | 2 | 4 | Ann-Marie Hepler | Marshall Islands | 33.72 | |
| 61 | 2 | 7 | Meryem Bada | Morocco | 34.01 | |
| 62 | 2 | 2 | Sonia Tumiotto | Tanzania | 34.11 | |
| 63 | 4 | 0 | Catherine Mason | Tanzania | 34.90 | |
| 64 | 2 | 3 | Diana Basho | Albania | 35.40 | |
| 65 | 2 | 8 | Seabe Ebineng | Botswana | 35.67 | |
| 66 | 2 | 1 | Roylin Akiwo | Palau | 36.03 | |
| 67 | 1 | 3 | Mayra-Linda Paul | Federated States of Micronesia | 36.54 | |
| 68 | 2 | 0 | Hem Thon Vitiny | Cambodia | 36.72 | |
| 69 | 1 | 5 | Angela Kendrick | Marshall Islands | 37.75 | |
| — | 8 | 2 | Katarína Listopadová | Slovakia | | DNS |
| — | 1 | 4 | Salie Alatrash | Palestine | | DSQ |

=== Semifinals ===
The semifinals were held at 18:15.

==== Semifinal 1 ====
| Rank | Lane | Name | Nationality | Time | Notes |
|---|---|---|---|---|---|
| 1 | 5 | Felicia Lee | United States | 26.22 | Q |
| 2 | 4 | Katinka Hosszú | Hungary | 26.38 | Q |
| 3 | 3 | Simona Baumrtová | Czech Republic | 26.44 | Q |
| 4 | 6 | Shiho Sakai | Japan | 26.71 | |
| 5 | 7 | Amy Bilquist | United States | 26.78 | |
| 6 | 2 | Mie Nielsen | Denmark | 26.85 | |
| 7 | 1 | Yekaterina Rudenko | Kazakhstan | 27.34 | |
| 8 | 8 | Michelle Coleman | Sweden | 27.65 | |

==== Semifinal 2 ====
| Rank | Lane | Name | Nationality | Time | Notes |
|---|---|---|---|---|---|
| 1 | 4 | Emily Seebohm | Australia | 25.87 | Q, CR |
| 2 | 2 | Etiene Medeiros | Brazil | 25.99 | Q, AM |
| 3 | 3 | Daryna Zevina | Ukraine | 26.20 | Q |
| 4 | 6 | Georgia Davies | Great Britain | 26.22 | Q |
| 5 | 5 | Aleksandra Urbanczyk | Poland | 26.36 | Q |
| 6 | 7 | Madison Wilson | Australia | 26.65 | |
| 7 | 8 | Arianna Barbieri | Italy | 27.01 | |
| 8 | 1 | Stephanie Au | Hong Kong | 27.04 | |

=== Final ===
The final was held at 18:11.

| Rank | Lane | Name | Nationality | Time | Notes |
|---|---|---|---|---|---|
| 1st place, gold medalist(s) | 5 | Etiene Medeiros | Brazil | 25.67 | WR |
| 2nd place, silver medalist(s) | 4 | Emily Seebohm | Australia | 25.83 | OC |
| 3rd place, bronze medalist(s) | 1 | Katinka Hosszú | Hungary | 25.96 | |
| 4 | 3 | Daryna Zevina | Ukraine | 25.99 | |
| 5 | 6 | Felicia Lee | United States | 26.16 | |
| 6 | 7 | Aleksandra Urbanczyk | Poland | 26.37 | |
| 7 | 2 | Georgia Davies | Great Britain | 26.38 | |
| 7 | 8 | Simona Baumrtová | Czech Republic | 26.38 | |
