= Vladislav Kozlov =

Russian swimmer (born 1997)

Personal information
- Nickname: Vlad
- National team: Russia
- Born: 15 March 1997 (age 29)
- Height: 1.83 m (6 ft 0 in)
- Weight: 68 kg (150 lb; 10.7 st)

Sport
- Sport: Swimming
- Strokes: freestyle, medley
- College team: Samara State Aerospace University
Medal record
Men's swimming
Representing Russia
European Games
Gold medal – first place	2015 Baku	4×100 m medley
Gold medal – first place	2015 Baku	4×100 m mixed freestyle
Bronze medal – third place	2015 Baku	4×100 m freestyle
Bronze medal – third place	2015 Baku	100 m freestyle
World Junior Championships
Gold medal – first place	2015 Singapore	4x100 m medley
Bronze medal – third place	2015 Singapore	4x100 m mixed freestyle

Vladislav Kozlov (Russian: Владислав Козлов), (born 15 March 1997) is a Russian swimmer.

== Career ==
In 2014, Kozlov's first major international meet at the 2014 European Junior Championships, he won a bronze medal in men's 50 m butterfly.

In June 2015 at the inaugural 2015 European Games in Baku, Kozlov won the gold medal with the Russian Team in men's 4 × 100 m medley (with Daniil Pakhomov, Anton Chupkov and Filipp Shopin touching in 3:36.38), a new junior world record breaking the previous record held by Russia in 3:38.02 at the 2014 Youth Olympics. and in 4 × 100 m mixed freestyle (with Arina Openysheva, Elisei Stepanov and Mariia Kameneva at a time of 3:30.30). Kozlov also won bronze in the individual men's 100 m freestyle and with the Russian Team in men's 4 × 100 m freestyle.

On August 25–30, Kozlov competed at the 2015 World Junior Championships in Singapore, he won gold with the Russian team in men's 4x100 medley (with Daniil Pakhomov, Anton Chupkov, Roman Larin, touching in 3:36.44), taking a meets record. and bronze in mixed 4 × 100 m freestyle (with Mariia Kameneva, Arina Openysheva and Igor Shadrin).
