= Marc Hinawi =

Arab-Israeli swimmer (born 1997)

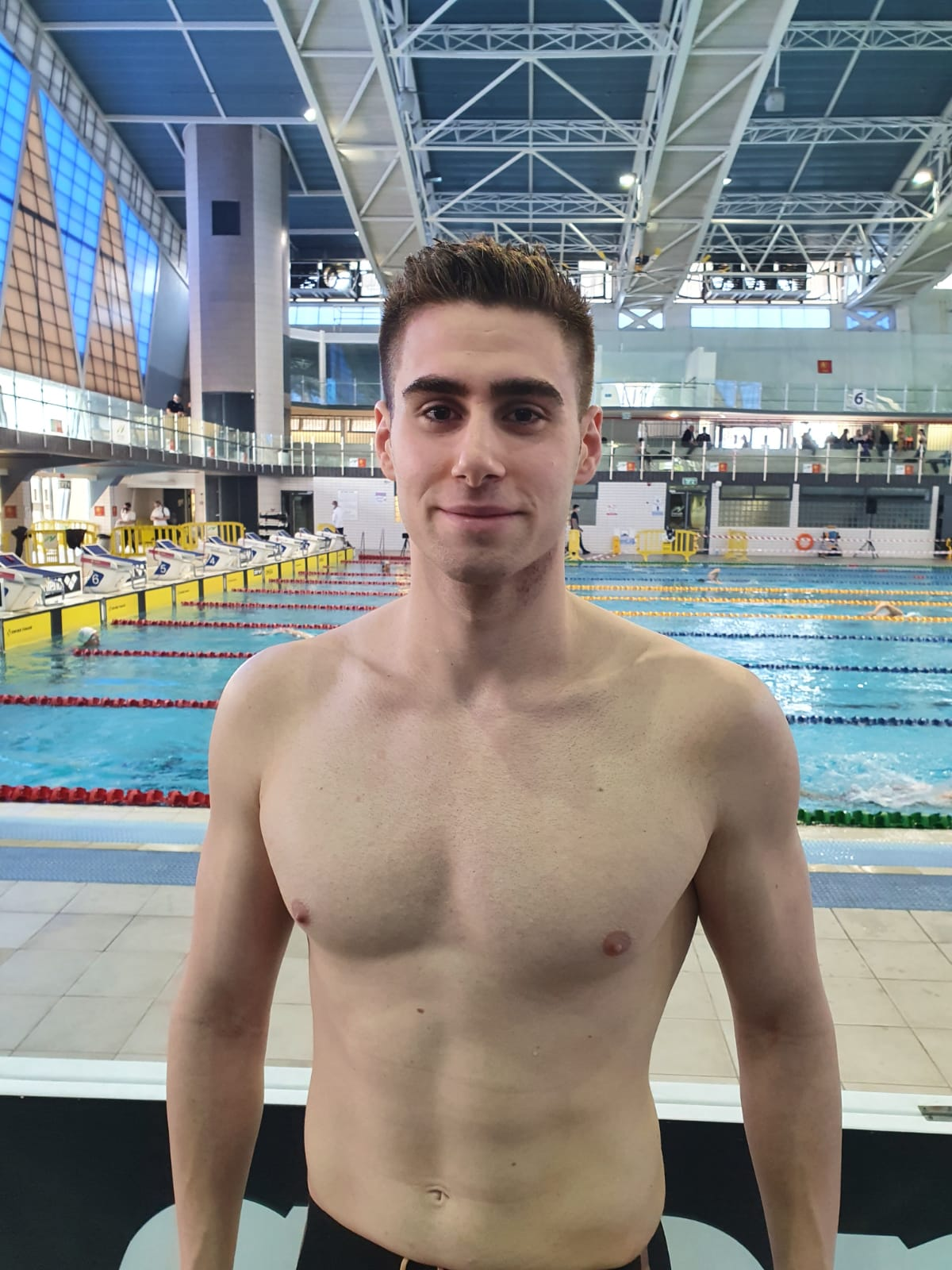

Personal information
- Native name: מארק חינאווי
- Nationality: Israeli
- Born: April 12, 1997 (age 29) Jaffa, Israel
- Height: 1.85 m (6 ft 1 in)
- Weight: 87 kg (192 lb)

Sport
- Sport: Swimming
- Strokes: 1500 m freestyle and 800 m freestyle
- Club: Hapoel Bat Yam
- Coach: Meir Levy
Medal record
Men's swimming
Representing Israel
European Games
| Bronze medal – third place | 2015 Baku | 1500 m freestyle |
European Youth Olympic Festival
| Gold medal – first place | 2013 Utrecht | 400 m freestyle |
| Gold medal – first place | 2013 Utrecht | 1500 m freestyle |

Marc Hinawi (also Hinnawi and Hinaui; Arabic: مارك حناوي; Hebrew: מארק חינאווי; born April 12, 1997) is an Arab-Israeli swimmer.

At the 2013 European Youth Summer Olympic Festival, at the age of 16 Hinawi won a gold medal in the 400 meter (m) freestyle finals, setting a new world record in his age group. In June 2015, at the age of 18, representing Israel at the 2015 European Games he won a bronze medal in the Men's 1500 m freestyle.

== Early life ==
Hinawi was born in Jaffa, Israel, where he grew up and resides. His father is Jaffa-born Christian Arab-Israeli Tawfiq Hinnawi, owner of the "Hinnawi Nicola" liquor chain and of restaurants in Tel Aviv and Rishon LeZion, and his mother is Maha. He is Arab-Israeli, and is Christian. He studied at the Tabeetha School in Jaffa, then moved to the University of Tennessee and aspires to become a chemical engineer.

== Swimming career ==
Hinawi began swimming at the age of five. Since then, his club has been Hapoel Bat Yam, and his coach has been Meir Levy. He performs 11 workouts a week.

He swims freestyle, backstroke, and butterfly at various distances. Hinawi specializes in the 1500 meter (m) freestyle, and the 800 m freestyle. In February 2013 at the Israeli swimming championship he competed in the 400 m, 800 m, and 1,500 m races.

At the 2013 European Youth Summer Olympic Festival in Utrecht, the Netherlands, in July 2013 at the age of 16, Hinawi won a gold medal in the 400 m freestyle finals. He finished in a time of 3:57.73, a new world record for his age group and a personal best. As he accepted his medal, the Israeli team applauded him and saluted him. He also won a gold medal in the 1500 m freestyle, in a time of 15:33.72, setting another age group record. He noted that it was his "sixth Israeli youth record in total."

On July 10, 2014, Hinawi came in fifth at the European Junior Swimming Championships in the Men's 1500 m freestyle. Two days later he came in ninth at the European Junior Championships in the Men's 800 m freestyle. In December 2014 he set a new Israeli record in the 400 m freestyle at the Israeli short course championship, with a time of 3:45.74, breaking a record that had stood since 2008.

In March 2015, Hinawi set a new youth record for the 1,500 m, swum in Israel. He swam it in 15:41.73 minutes.

On June 24, 2015, at the age of 18, representing Israel at the 2015 European Games in Baku, Azerbaijan, Hinawi came in third and won a bronze medal in the Men's 1500 m Freestyle with a time of 15:25.63 minutes. That time was a new personal best for Hinawi and junior Israeli national record (breaking his own prior national record), and was seven seconds slower than the senior Israeli national record. The Baku swimming events were limited to junior swimmers, and the tournament also doubled as the European Junior Swimming Championships. Hinawi said: "This feels amazing, but I expected to register a better result. I’m really happy, but I believe I can swim faster." He said that his goal was to reach the Rio Summer Olympics in 2016. In the 800 m, he finished sixth, but set a new Israeli youth record with a time of 8:07:30 minutes.
