= Maryna Kolesnykova =

Ukrainian swimmer (born 2000)

Personal information
- Nationality: Ukrainian
- Born: 15 February 2000 (age 26) Kharkiv Oblast, Ukraine
- Height: 1.70 m (5 ft 7 in)
- Weight: 69 kg (152 lb)

Sport
- Sport: Swimming
- Strokes: Backstroke
Medal record
Women's swimming
Representing Ukraine
European Games
Bronze medal – third place	2015 Baku	200 metre backstroke
European Junior Championships
Silver medal – second place	2016 Hódmezővásárhely	100 m backstroke
European Youth Olympic Festival
Bronze medal – third place	2013 Utrecht	100 m backstroke

Maryna Kolesnykova (Ukrainian: Марина Колесникова; born 15 December 2000) is a female Ukrainian swimmer. She won one bronze medal at the inaugural European Games where she was third in the 200 metre backstroke. She also competed in the 100 metre backstroke where she finished 4th as well as the 50 metre backstroke where she reached semifinals and finished 10th.

Kolesnykova participated in the 2018 European Championships in Glasgow, Scotland, where she finished 27th in 200 metre backstroke. She also competed at the 2018 Summer Youth Olympics in Buenos Aires, Argentina. At the Games, she finished 20th in 200 metre backstroke and 21st in 100 metre backstroke.
