= Daniil Pakhomov =

Russian swimmer (born 1998)

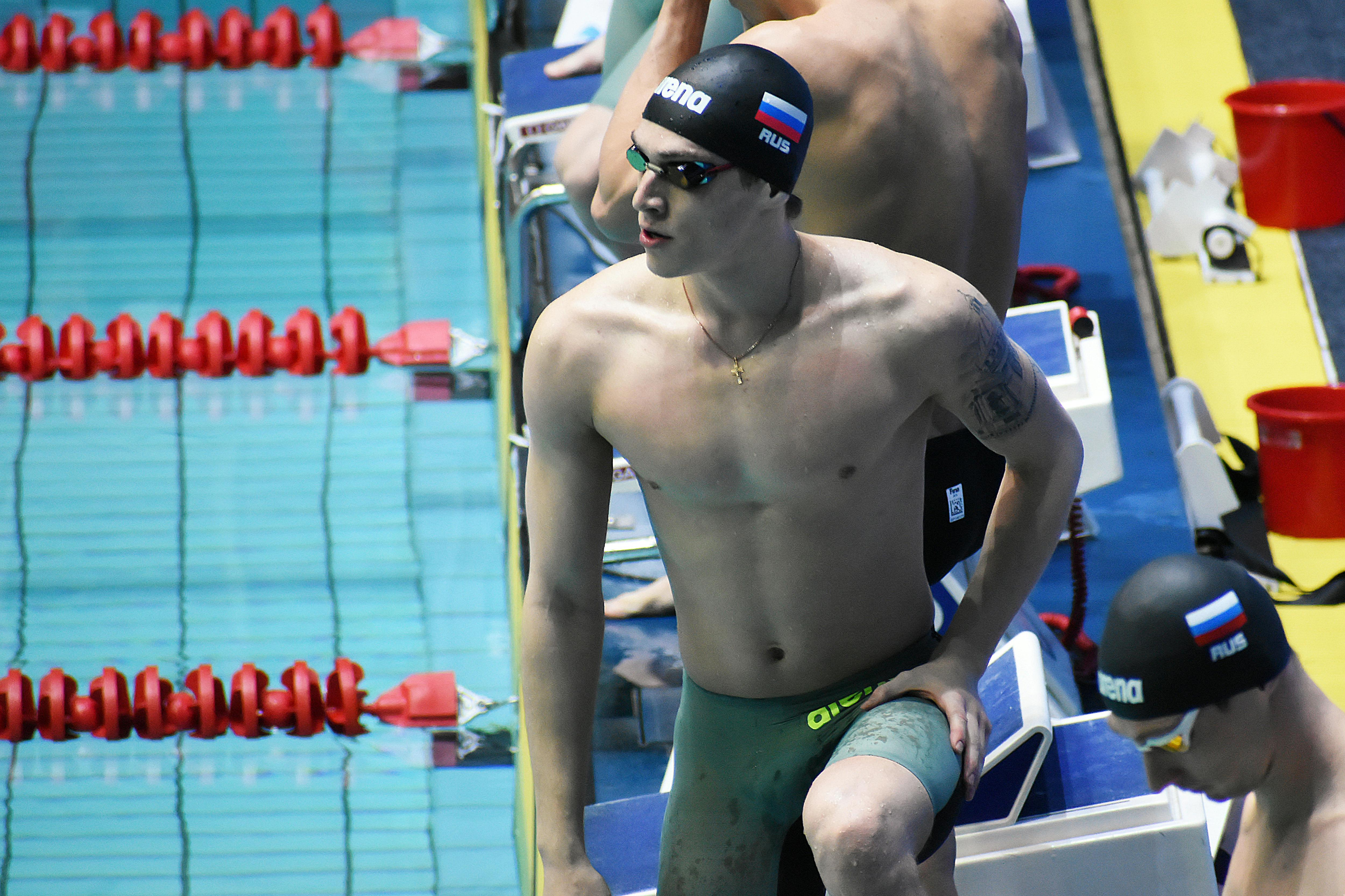

Personal information
- Full name: Daniil Pavlovich Pakhomov
- Nickname: Danya
- National team: Russia
- Born: 5 August 1998 (age 27) Arkhangelsk, Arkhangelsk Oblast, Russia
- Height: 1.86 m (6 ft 1 in)
- Weight: 74 kg (163 lb)

Sport
- Sport: Swimming
- Strokes: Butterfly, medley
Medal record
Men's swimming
Representing Russia
World Championships (LC)
Bronze medal – third place	2017 Budapest	4×100 m medley
World Championships (SC)
Gold medal – first place	2016 Windsor	4x50 m medley
European Games
Gold medal – first place	2015 Baku	200 m butterfly
Gold medal – first place	2015 Baku	100 m butterfly
Gold medal – first place	2015 Baku	4×100 m medley
Gold medal – first place	2015 Baku	4×100 m mixed medley
Bronze medal – third place	2015 Baku	50 m butterfly
World Junior Championships
Gold medal – first place	2015 Singapore	100 m butterfly
Gold medal – first place	2015 Singapore	4×100 m medley
Gold medal – first place	2015 Singapore	4×100 m mixed medley
Silver medal – second place	2015 Singapore	100 m butterfly
Bronze medal – third place	2015 Singapore	50 m butterfly
Military World Games
Gold medal – first place	2019 Wuhan	100 m butterfly
Gold medal – first place	2019 Wuhan	4×100 m medley
Bronze medal – third place	2019 Wuhan	50 m butterfly
Bronze medal – third place	2019 Wuhan	200 m butterfly

Daniil Pavlovich Pakhomov (Russian: Даниил Павлович Пахомов); born 5 August 1998) is a Russian swimmer.

He won four gold medals in (200 m, 100 m butterfly, 4 × 100 m medley and 4 × 100 m mixed medley) and breaking a new Junior World record in 100m butterfly at the 2015 European Games.

== Career ==
In June 2015, 16-year-old Pakhomov was selected to compete at the inaugural 2015 European Games in Baku, Pakhomov won four gold medals, in (200m, 100 m butterfly), in 4 × 100 m mixed medley (with Anton Chupkov, Arina Openysheva and Maria Kameneva at a time of 3:49.53) and in 4 × 100 m medley (with Anton Chupkov, Vladislav Kozlov and Filipp Shopin touching in at 3:36.38), a new junior world record breaking the previous record held by Russia in 3:38.02 at the 2014 Youth Olympics. Pakhomov also broke a new junior world record in 100m butterfly.

On August 2–9, Pakhomov appeared in his first seniors at the 2015 World Championships in Kazan, competing with Russian Team in 4 × 100 m mixed medley (with Yulia Efimova, Vladimir Morozov, and Anastasia Fesikova) where they finished 5th and in men's 4 × 100 m medley (with Kirill Prigoda, Evgeny Rylov, and Vladimir Morozov) also finishing 5th in the finals.

On August 25–30, Pakhomov then competed at the 2015 World Junior Championships in Singapore, he took individual medals winning gold in men's 100 m butterfly (52.28, a meet record), silver in 200 m butterfly and bronze in 50 m butterfly. In Team events, Pakhomov also competed in 4 × 100 m mixed medley (with Anton Chupkov, Irina Pridhoko and Arina Openysheva) were Russia threw in a new Junior World record touching in at 3:45.85 and in men's 4x100 medley (with Anton Chupkov, Vladislav Kozlov, Roman Larin, touching in 3:36.44), taking a meets record.
