= Maria Kameneva =

Russian swimmer (born 1999)

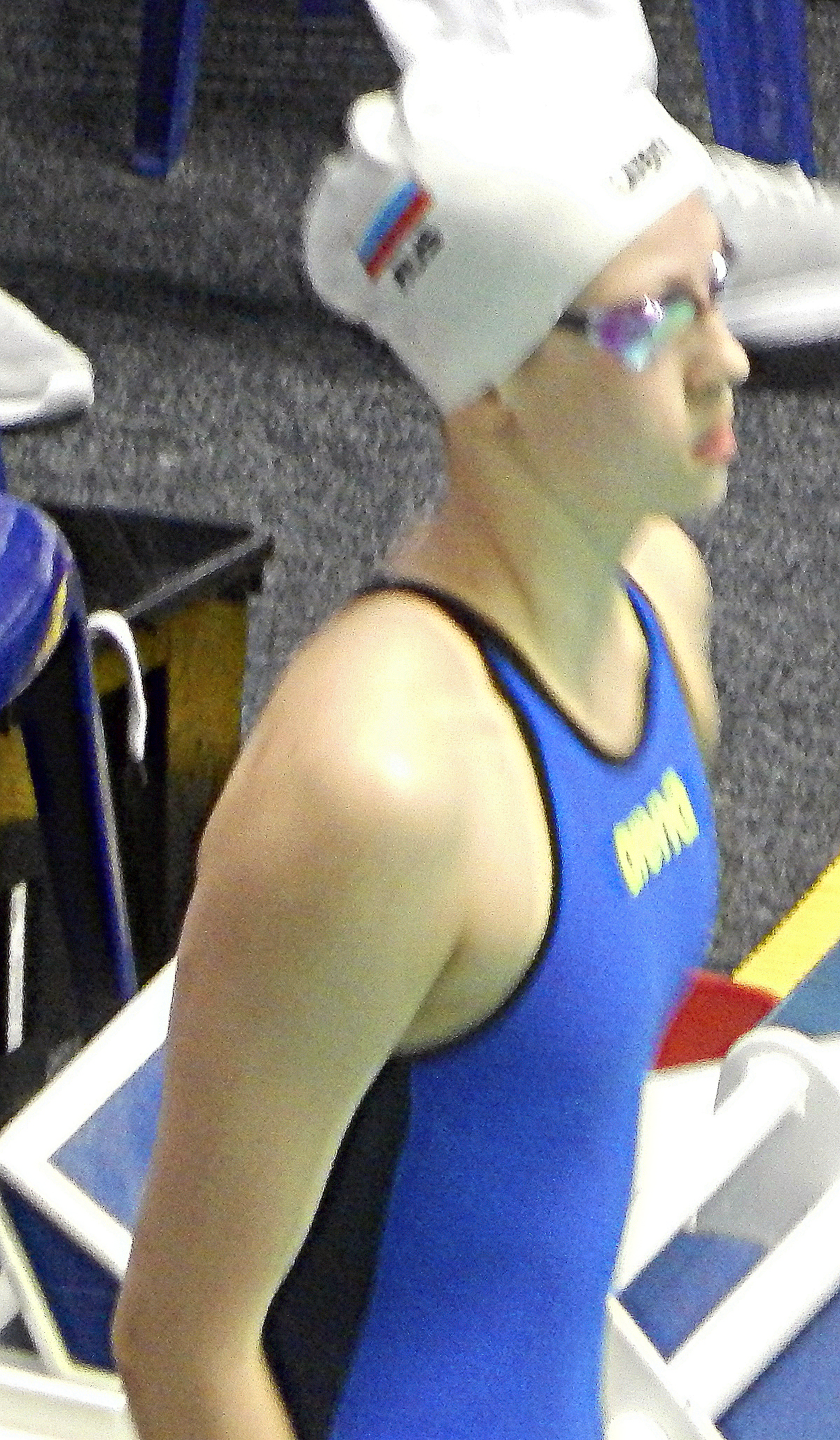
- 2018 Russian National Championships

Personal information
- Full name: Maria Andreevna Kameneva
- National team: Russia
- Born: 27 May 1999 (age 27) Orenburg, Russia
- Height: 1.72 m (5 ft 8 in)
- Weight: 55 kg (121 lb)

Sport
- Sport: Swimming
- Strokes: Freestyle, Backstroke
- Coach: Vladimir Kirillov
Medal record
Women's swimming
Representing Russian Swimming Federation
World Championships (SC)
Bronze medal – third place	2021 Abu Dhabi	100 m medley
Bronze medal – third place	2021 Abu Dhabi	4×50 m mixed freestyle
Representing Russia
World Championships (SC)
Gold medal – first place	2016 Windsor	4×50 m mixed freestyle
Bronze medal – third place	2018 Hangzhou	4×50 m mixed freestyle
Bronze medal – third place	2018 Hangzhou	4×50 m mixed medley
European Championships (LC)
Gold medal – first place	2018 Glasgow	4×100 m medley
Silver medal – second place	2018 Glasgow	4×100 m mixed medley
Silver medal – second place	2020 Budapest	4×100 m medley
Bronze medal – third place	2018 Glasgow	4×100 m mixed freestyle
Bronze medal – third place	2020 Budapest	100 m backstroke
Bronze medal – third place	2020 Budapest	4×200 m mixed freestyle
European Championships (SC)
Gold medal – first place	2019 Glasgow	50 m freestyle
Gold medal – first place	2019 Glasgow	4×50 m mixed freestyle
Gold medal – first place	2019 Glasgow	4×50 m mixed medley
Gold medal – first place	2021 Kazan	4×50 m freestyle
Gold medal – first place	2021 Kazan	4×50 m medley
Silver medal – second place	2017 Copenhagen	4×50 m mixed freestyle
Silver medal – second place	2019 Glasgow	100 m backstroke
Silver medal – second place	2019 Glasgow	100 m medley
Silver medal – second place	2021 Kazan	100 m medley
Bronze medal – third place	2017 Copenhagen	100 m backstroke
Bronze medal – third place	2019 Glasgow	4×50 m medley
Bronze medal – third place	2021 Kazan	50 m freestyle
Bronze medal – third place	2021 Kazan	4×50 m mixed medley
Summer Universiade
Silver medal – second place	2017 Taipei	4×100 m freestyle
Silver medal – second place	2017 Taipei	100 m freestyle
Silver medal – second place	2017 Taipei	50 m freestyle
European Games
Gold medal – first place	2015 Baku	50 m freestyle
Gold medal – first place	2015 Baku	4×100 m freestyle
Gold medal – first place	2015 Baku	4×200 m freestyle
Gold medal – first place	2015 Baku	4×100 m medley
Gold medal – first place	2015 Baku	4×100 m mixed freestyle
Gold medal – first place	2015 Baku	4×100 m mixed medley
Silver medal – second place	2015 Baku	100 m backstroke
Bronze medal – third place	2015 Baku	50 m backstroke
Bronze medal – third place	2015 Baku	100 m freestyle

Maria Andreyevna Kameneva (Russian: Мария Андреевна Каменева; born 27 May 1999) is a Russian competitive swimmer. She won nine medals at the 2015 European Games. Six of them were gold (1 is individual, 5 are in relays), one was silver (individual) and two were bronze (both individual).
