= Georgia Coates =

British swimmer (born 1999)

Personal information
- Nicknames: Gee, Gee-Money
- Nationality: British
- Born: 19 February 1999 (age 27) Leeds, West Yorkshire, United Kingdom
- Height: 1.70 m (5 ft 7 in)
- Weight: 54 kg (119 lb)

Sport
- Sport: Swimming
- Strokes: Breaststroke
- Club: City of Leeds Swimming Club
- Coach: Richard Denigan
Medal record
Women's swimming
Representing Great Britain
European Games
Silver medal – second place	2015 Baku	4×100 m mixed freestyle
Silver medal – second place	2015 Baku	4×100 m mixed medley
Bronze medal – third place	2015 Baku	4×100 m freestyle
Bronze medal – third place	2015 Baku	4×200 m freestyle
Bronze medal – third place	2015 Baku	4×100 m medley

Georgia Coates (born 19 February 1999) is a British swimmer who won five medals at the 2015 European Games. She has been selected to compete for Great Britain at the 2016 Summer Olympics in Rio de Janeiro, Brazil.

== Personal life ==
Coates was born on 19 February 1999 in Leeds, West Yorkshire, United Kingdom. She attends Prince Henry's Grammar School, Otley where she earned 12 GCSEs, completing her final exam in Baku whilst competing at the 2015 European Games.

== Swimming ==
Coates is a member of the City of Leeds Swimming Club where she is coached by Richard Denigan. In 2013, she represented Great Britain at the European Youth Olympic Festival in Utrecht, Netherlands.

She was selected to swim for Great Britain at the 2015 European Games held in Baku, Azerbaijan. In the 100-metre freestyle she reached the semi-finals and finished 12th in a time of 57.35 seconds. She reached the final of the 400-metre individual medley but missed out on a medal after finishing fourth. She won her first medal, a bronze, in the women's 4 × 100-metre freestyle relay alongside Darcy Deakin, Maddie Crompton and Hannah Featherstone. In the mixed 4 × 100-metre freestyle relay Coates, Deakin, Martyn Walton and Duncan Scott won a silver medal behind the Russian quartet. She placed fifth in the 200-metre breaststroke, she won further bronze medals in the women's 4 × 200-metre freestyle relay and the women's 4 × 100-metre medley relay. She won her fifth medal of the Games in the mixed 4 × 100-metre medley relay, as the British team, which also featured Luke Greenbank, Charlie Attwood and Amelia Clynes, took silver behind Russia.

At the 2015 FINA World Junior Swimming Championships held in Singapore, she won two medals. She won a silver medal, finishing second to British team mate Rosie Rudin, in the girl's 400-metre individual medley, the took the bronze medal in the 200-metre individual relay.

Coates finished third in the 200-metre freestyle at the 2016 British National Championships. As a result, she was selected as part of the Great Britain team for the 2016 Summer Olympics in Rio de Janeiro, Brazil, where she will compete in the 4 × 200-metre freestyle relay with Jazmin Carlin, Ellie Faulkner and Camilla Hattersley. At 17-years-old Coates is the youngest member of the Great Britain swimming team at the Games.
