= Ioanna Sacha =

Greek swimmer (born 1999)

Personal information
- Nationality: Greek
- Born: 22 June 1999 (age 27)

Sport
- Sport: Swimming
- College team: University of Northern Colorado (2017–2018); University of Houston (2018–2021)

Ioanna Sacha (born 22 June 1999) is a Greek swimmer. She competed in the women's 100 metre backstroke event at the 2020 European Aquatics Championships, in Budapest, Hungary.
