= Iris Tjonk =

Dutch swimmer (born 2000)

Personal information
- Born: 13 April 2000 (age 26) Almelo, Netherlands
- Height: 178 cm (5 ft 10 in)
- Weight: 60 kg (132 lb)

Sport
- Country: Netherlands
- Sport: swimming
Medal record
Women's swimming
Representing Netherlands
European Games
Silver medal – second place	2015 Baku	4 × 100 metre medley relay
- Updated on 10 September 2015

Iris Tjonk (born 13 April 2000 in Almelo) is a Dutch swimmer. She won the silver medal in the 100m backstroke at the Swimming at the 2013 European Youth Summer Olympic Festival. At the 2015 European Games in Baku, Azerbaijan, she won the silver medal in the 4 × 100 metre medley relay event.

== See also ==
- Netherlands at the 2015 European Games
