= Yuliya Stisyuk =

Azerbaijani swimmer

Personal information
- Born: 11 September 2000 (age 25)

Sport
- Country: Azerbaijan
- Sport: Swimming
- Event: Backstroke

Yuliya Stisyuk (born 11 September 2000) is a swimmer from Azerbaijan. She competed in 50 m, 100 m, 200 m backstroke events in 2014 FINA World Swimming Championships (25 m) and set a record of Azerbaijan swimmers in these disciplines. Stisyuk also competed in the 2015 European Games in backstroke disciplines. Stisyuk was part of the women's 4 × 100 metre medley relay team that won the bronze medal at the 2017 Islamic Solidarity Games in Baku, Azerbaijan.
