= Women's épée at the 2010 World Fencing Championships =

- Venue: Grand Palais
- Location: Paris, France
- Dates: 8 November

Medalists
gold medal	Maureen Nisima	France
silver medal	Emese Szász	Hungary
bronze medal	Nathalie Moellhausen	Italy
bronze medal	Tatiana Logunova	Russia

The Women's épée event took place on November 8, 2010 at Grand Palais.

== Draw ==
=== Finals ===
Semi-finals
(Hungary) Emese Szász	15
(Italy) Nathalie Moellhausen	8
(Russia) Tatiana Logunova	14
(France) Maureen Nisima	15

Final
(Hungary) Emese Szász	10
(France) Maureen Nisima	15

=== Top half ===
==== Section 1 ====
Round of 64
(Hungary) Emese Szász	15
(Lithuania) Jurate Stucinskaite	9
(Estonia) Julia Beljajeva	15
(Russia) Violetta Kolobova	12
(Italy) Mara Navarria	11
(United States) Kelley Hurley	15
(Dominican Republic) Violeta Ramirez Peguero	10
(Germany) Monika Sozanska	15
(Romania) Ana Maria Brânză	15
(Kyrgyzstan) Vera Kaminskaya	8
(Kyrgyzstan) Mergul Abieva	8
(Romania) Loredana Iordăchioiu	15
(France) Hajnalka Kiraly	15
(Estonia) Kristina Kuusk	14
(Hungary) Dorina Budai	8
(France) Laura Flessel-Colovic	15

Round of 32
(Hungary) Emese Szász	12
(Estonia) Julia Beljajeva	5
(United States) Kelley Hurley	15
(Germany) Monika Sozanska	9
(Romania) Ana Maria Brânză	12
(Romania) Loredana Iordăchioiu	15
(France) Hajnalka Kiraly	6
(France) Laura Flessel-Colovic	7

Round of 16
(Hungary) Emese Szász	15
(United States) Kelley Hurley	7
(Romania) Loredana Iordăchioiu	12
(France) Laura Flessel-Colovic	15

Quarterfinals
(Hungary) Emese Szász	15
(France) Laura Flessel-Colovic	14

==== Section 2 ====
Round of 64
(Poland) Magdalena Piekarska	15
(Tunisia) Sarra Besbes	7
(South Korea) Park Se-ra	9
(Russia) Olga Kochneva	15
(Switzerland) Tiffany Géroudet	15
(Canada) Joanna Guy	10
(South Korea) Shin A-lam	6
(South Korea) Jung Hyo-jung	7
(Romania) Anca Măroiu	13
(Denmark) Karin Louise Hooge	15
(Italy) Nathalie Moellhausen	15
(Estonia) Irina Embrich	13
(Sweden) Johanna Bergdahl	13
(Poland) Ewa Nelip	14
(United States) Courtney Hurley	8
(Ukraine) Yana Shemyakina	9

Round of 32
(Poland) Magdalena Piekarska	15
(Russia) Olga Kochneva	9
(Switzerland) Tiffany Géroudet	11
(South Korea) Jung Hyo-jung	15
(Denmark) Karin Louise Hooge	10
(Italy) Nathalie Moellhausen	15
(Poland) Ewa Nelip	14
(Ukraine) Yana Shemyakina	15

Round of 16
(Poland) Magdalena Piekarska	15
(South Korea) Jung Hyo-jung	11
(Italy) Nathalie Moellhausen	14
(Ukraine) Yana Shemyakina	12

Quarterfinals
(Poland) Magdalena Piekarska	12
(Italy) Nathalie Moellhausen	15

=== Bottom half ===
==== Section 3 ====
Round of 64
(Russia) Tatiana Logunova	15
(Slovakia) Dagmar Baranikova	5
(Sweden) Nina Westman	7
(Japan) Megumi Ikeda	15
(Poland) Danuta Dmowska	14
(Ukraine) Kseniya Pantelyeyeva	15
(Canada) Ainsley Switzer	7
(China) Luo Xiaojuan	15
(South Korea) Oh Yun-hee	15
(Japan) Kozue Horikawa	10
(Chinese Taipei) Hsu Jo-Ting	14
(Sweden) Emma Samuelsson	15
(China) Sun Yujie	13
(Poland) Malgorzata Bereza	15
(Israel) Daria Strelnikov	14
(Germany) Imke Duplitzer	15

Round of 32
(Russia) Tatiana Logunova	10
(Japan) Megumi Ikeda	8
(Ukraine) Kseniya Pantelyeyeva	10
(China) Luo Xiaojuan	12
(South Korea) Oh Yun-hee	15
(Sweden) Emma Samuelsson	12
(Poland) Malgorzata Bereza	15
(Germany) Imke Duplitzer	11

Round of 16
(Russia) Tatiana Logunova	7
(China) Luo Xiaojuan	6
(South Korea) Oh Yun-hee	15
(Poland) Malgorzata Bereza	12

Quarterfinals
(Russia) Tatiana Logunova	12
(South Korea) Oh Yun-hee	6

==== Section 4 ====
Round of 64
(Netherlands) Sonja Tol	9
(Venezuela) María Martínez	10
(Ukraine) Olena Kryvytska	15
(China) Xu Anqi	14
(Japan) Nozomi Nakano	15
(Brazil) Cleia Guilhon	13
(Hungary) Edina Antal	15
(Italy) Bianca Del Carretto	7
(France) Maureen Nisima	15
(Latvia) Jeļena Rubļevska	4
(Finland) Suvi Lehtonen	5
(Italy) F. Quondamcarlo	13
(Romania) Simona Alexandru	14
(Switzerland) Sophie Lamon	15
(New Zealand) Jessica Beer	9
(Germany) Britta Heidemann	15

Round of 32
(Venezuela) María Martínez	11
(Ukraine) Olena Kryvytska	10
(Japan) Nozomi Nakano	4
(Hungary) Edina Antal	15
(France) Maureen Nisima	15
(Italy) F. Quondamcarlo	9
(Switzerland) Sophie Lamon	13
(Germany) Britta Heidemann	12

Round of 16
(Venezuela) María Martínez	2
(Hungary) Edina Antal	3
(France) Maureen Nisima	15
(Switzerland) Sophie Lamon	12

Quarterfinals
(Hungary) Edina Antal	10
(France) Maureen Nisima	15
