= Women's épée at the 2011 World Fencing Championships =

The Women's épée event of the 2011 World Fencing Championships took place on October 13, 2011.

== Medalists ==
Gold	Li Na (CHN)
Silver	Sun Yujie (CHN)
Bronze	Ana Maria Brânză (ROU)
Bronze	Anca Măroiu (ROU)

== Draw ==
=== Finals ===
Semi-finals
(Romania) Ana Brânză	14
(China) Sun Yujie	15
(China) Li Na	13p
(Romania) Anca Măroiu	13

Final
(China) Sun Yujie	7
(China) Li Na	13

=== Top half ===
==== Section 1 ====
Round of 64
(France) Maureen Nisima	12
(Estonia) Julia Zuikova	15
(Serbia) Aleksandra Jevremović	14
(United Kingdom) Corinna Lawrence	15
(Romania) Loredana Dinu	15
(United Kingdom) Elisa Albini	9
(Finland) Catharina Kock	8
(Germany) Monika Sozanska	15
(Romania) Ana Brânză	15
(Chile) Caterin Aranguiz	10
(Hungary) Emese Takács	11
(Italy) Rossella Fiamingo	15
(Poland) Małgorzata Bereza	13
(Poland) Ewa Nelip	14
(United Kingdom) Georgina Usher	8
(Italy) Bianca Del Carretto	15

Round of 32
(Estonia) Julia Zuikova	10
(United Kingdom) Corinna Lawrence	15
(Romania) Loredana Dinu	13
(Germany) Monika Sozanska	15
(Romania) Ana Brânză	15
(Italy) Rossella Fiamingo	14
(Poland) Ewa Nelip	7
(Italy) Bianca Del Carretto	15

Round of 16
(United Kingdom) Corinna Lawrence	9
(Germany) Monika Sozanska	15
(Romania) Ana Brânză	6
(Italy) Bianca Del Carretto	5

Quarterfinals
(Germany) Monika Sozanska	11
(Romania) Ana Brânză	15

==== Section 2 ====
Round of 64
(Ukraine) Yana Shemyakina	15
(Brazil) Amanda Simeão	7
(Germany) Ricarda Multerer	10
(Sweden) Emma Samuelsson	11
(Estonia) Irina Embrich	13
(Israel) Noam Mills	15
(Israel) Avital Marinuk	9
(China) Sun Yujie	15
(Romania) Simona Alexandru	15
(United States) Lindsay Campbell	8
(Switzerland) Simone Naef	14
(Germany) Imke Duplitzer	15
(France) Sarah Daninthe	15
(Hong Kong) Yeung Chui Ling	10
(United States) Maya Lawrence	15
(France) Laura Flessel-Colovic	14

Round of 32
(Ukraine) Yana Shemyakina	15
(Sweden) Emma Samuelsson	11
(Israel) Noam Mills	14
(China) Sun Yujie	15
(Romania) Simona Alexandru	15
(Germany) Imke Duplitzer	13
(France) Sarah Daninthe	15
(United States) Maya Lawrence	11

Round of 16
(Ukraine) Yana Shemyakina	9
(China) Sun Yujie	15
(Romania) Simona Alexandru	15
(France) Sarah Daninthe	10

Quarterfinals
(China) Sun Yujie	15
(Romania) Simona Alexandru	14

=== Bottom half ===
==== Section 3 ====
Round of 64
(Poland) Magdalena Piekarska	15
(Cuba) Yamilka Quesada	13
(Venezuela) María Martínez	6
(China) Xu Anqi	15
(Italy) Mara Navarria	15
(Canada) Sherraine Schalm	5
(Azerbaijan) Yulia Nelyubova	11
(China) Luo Xiaojuan	15
(Italy) Nathalie Moellhausen	15
(Sweden) Nina Westman	14
(Sweden) Johanna Bergdahl	4
(South Korea) Jung Hyo-Jung	13
(South Korea) Oh Yun-hee	5
(United States) Courtney Hurley	15
(China) Li Na	15
(Russia) Tatiana Logounova	12

Round of 32
(Poland) Magdalena Piekarska	15
(China) Xu Anqi	14
(Italy) Mara Navarria	15
(China) Luo Xiaojuan	11
(Italy) Nathalie Moellhausen	9
(South Korea) Jung Hyo-Jung	15
(United States) Courtney Hurley	13
(China) Li Na	15

Round of 16
(Poland) Magdalena Piekarska	15
(Italy) Mara Navarria	14
(South Korea) Jung Hyo-Jung	9
(China) Li Na	15

Quarterfinals
(Poland) Magdalena Piekarska	10
(China) Li Na	15

==== Section 4 ====
Round of 64
(Russia) Anna Sivkova	15
(Cuba) Zuleidis Fuente	4
(Poland) Małgorzata Stroka	12
(Romania) Anca Măroiu	15
(Argentina) Elida Aguero	1
(Russia) Violetta Kolobova	15
(Slovakia) Dagmar Baranikova	8
(Switzerland) Tiffany Géroudet	15
(Russia) Lyubov Shutova	15
(Cuba) Marisol Gil	7
(Kazakhstan) Ulyana Balaganskaya	13
(South Korea) Shin A-lam	15
(France) Joséphine Coquin	13
(Netherlands) Sonja Tol	14
(South Korea) Choi In-jeong	15
(Hungary) Emese Szász	11

Round of 32
(Russia) Anna Sivkova	10
(Romania) Anca Măroiu	11
(Russia) Violetta Kolobova	10
(Switzerland) Tiffany Géroudet	15
(Russia) Lyubov Shutova	13
(South Korea) Shin A-lam	15
(Netherlands) Sonja Tol	11
(South Korea) Choi In-jeong	15

Round of 16
(Romania) Anca Măroiu	12
(Switzerland) Tiffany Géroudet	11
(South Korea) Shin A-lam	14
(South Korea) Choi In-jeong	13

Quarterfinals
(Romania) Anca Măroiu	15
(South Korea) Shin A-lam	10
