= Women's épée at the 2015 World Fencing Championships =

The Women's épée event of the 2015 World Fencing Championships was held on 15 July 2015. The qualification was held on 14 July 2015.

== Medalists ==
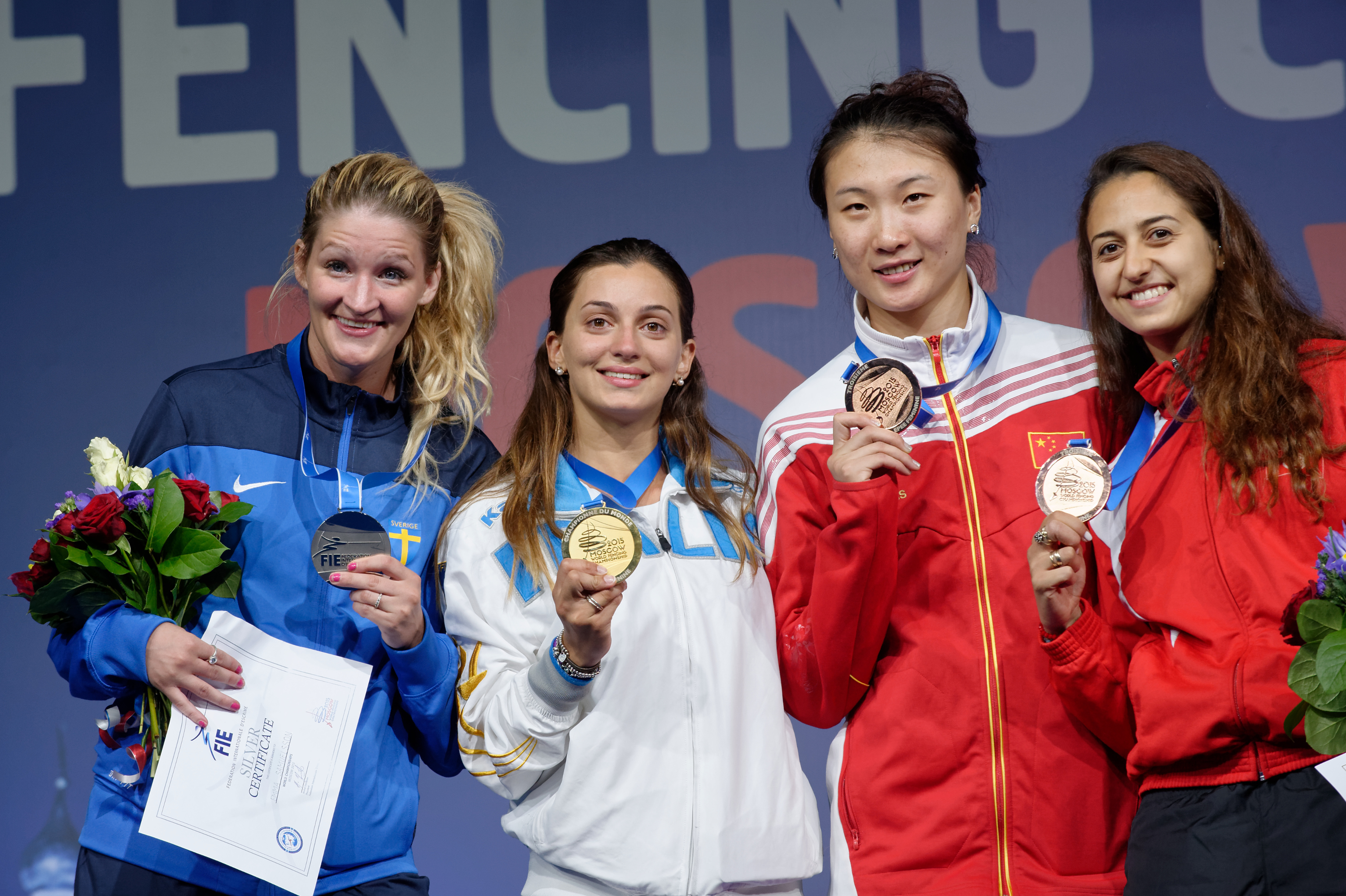
From left to right, Emma Samuelsson, Rossella Fiamingo, Xu Anqi and Sarra Besbes

Gold	(Italy) Rossella Fiamingo
Silver	(Sweden) Emma Samuelsson
Bronze	(Tunisia) Sarra Besbes
Bronze	(China) Xu Anqi

== Draw ==
=== Finals ===
Semi-finals
(Italy) Rossella Fiamingo	15
(Tunisia) Sarra Besbes	10
(Sweden) Emma Samuelsson	15
(China) Xu Anqi	12

Final
(Italy) Rossella Fiamingo	15
(Sweden) Emma Samuelsson	5

=== Top half ===
==== Section 1 ====
Round of 64
1	(Italy) Rossella Fiamingo	15
64	(Sweden) Sanne Gars	12
33	(Brazil) Nathalie Moellhausen	15
32	(Hungary) Dorina Budai	10
17	(United States) Courtney Hurley	15
48	(South Korea) Kang Young-mi	12
49	(United States) Katharine Holmes	15
16	(Russia) Tatiana Logunova	13
9	(South Korea) Shin A-lam	15
56	(Argentina) María Josef Duenas Nicolau	12
41	(Poland) Magdalena Piekarska	12
24	(Russia) Tatyana Gudkova	15
25	(Italy) Francesca Boscarelli	11
40	(Italy) Bianca Del Carretto	12
57	(Israel) Polina Melentiev	14
8	(Germany) Britta Heidemann	15

Round of 32
1	(Italy) Rossella Fiamingo	15
33	(Brazil) Nathalie Moellhausen	9
17	(United States) Courtney Hurley	15
49	(United States) Katharine Holmes	8
9	(South Korea) Shin A-lam	6
24	(Russia) Tatyana Gudkova	7
40	(Italy) Bianca Del Carretto	14
8	(Germany) Britta Heidemann	13

Round of 16
1	(Italy) Rossella Fiamingo	15
17	(United States) Courtney Hurley	11
24	(Russia) Tatyana Gudkova	9
40	(Italy) Bianca Del Carretto	15

Quarterfinals
1	(Italy) Rossella Fiamingo	15
40	(Italy) Bianca Del Carretto	4

==== Section 2 ====
Round of 64
5	(China) Sun Yujie	14
60	(Romania) Loredana Dinu	15
37	(Ukraine) Anfisa Pochkalova	9
28	(France) Maureen Nisima	15
21	(Romania) Simona Pop	10
44	(Germany) Monika Sozanska	11
53	(Sweden) Johanna Bergdahl	10
12	(South Korea) Choi In-jeong	15
13	(Tunisia) Sarra Besbes	15
52	(Poland) Ewa Nelip	10
45	(Russia) Olga Kochneva	15
20	(Ukraine) Olena Kryvytska	14
29	(Ukraine) Kseniya Pantelyeyeva	15
36	(Poland) Danuta Dmowska-Andrzejuk	11
61	(Israel) Nickol Tal	5
4	(Russia) Violetta Kolobova	15

Round of 32
60	(Romania) Loredana Dinu	15
28	(France) Maureen Nisima	7
44	(Germany) Monika Sozanska	9
12	(South Korea) Choi In-jeong	14
13	(Tunisia) Sarra Besbes	15
45	(Russia) Olga Kochneva	14
29	(Ukraine) Kseniya Pantelyeyeva	15
4	(Russia) Violetta Kolobova	4

Round of 16
60	(Romania) Loredana Dinu	15
12	(South Korea) Choi In-jeong	11
13	(Tunisia) Sarra Besbes	14
29	(Ukraine) Kseniya Pantelyeyeva	13

Quarterfinals
60	(Romania) Loredana Dinu	14
13	(Tunisia) Sarra Besbes	15

=== Bottom half ===
==== Section 3 ====
Round of 64
3	(Romania) Ana Maria Brânză	15
62	(Finland) Michaela Kock	7
35	(Germany) Ricarda Multerer	6
30	(Estonia) Katrina Lehis	15
19	(Switzerland) Pauline Brunner	2
46	(Germany) Alexandra Ndolo	4
51	(Israel) Avital Marinuk	13
14	(United States) Kelley Hurley	15
11	(France) Marie-Florence Candassamy	15
54	(Croatia) Tončica Topić	8
42	(Japan) Nozomi Sato	10
22	(Estonia) Irina Embrich	15
27	(Sweden) Emma Samuelsson	15
38	(Venezuela) María Martínez	11
59	(China) Sun Yiwen	15
6	(Estonia) Erika Kirpu	11

Round of 32
3	(Romania) Ana Maria Brânză	11
30	(Estonia) Katrina Lehis	15
46	(Germany) Alexandra Ndolo	15
14	(United States) Kelley Hurley	8
11	(France) Marie-Florence Candassamy	11
22	(Estonia) Irina Embrich	15
27	(Sweden) Emma Samuelsson	15
59	(China) Sun Yiwen	14

Round of 16
30	(Estonia) Katrina Lehis	15
46	(Germany) Alexandra Ndolo	10
22	(Estonia) Irina Embrich	12
27	(Sweden) Emma Samuelsson	15

Quarterfinals
30	(Estonia) Katrina Lehis	13
27	(Sweden) Emma Samuelsson	15

==== Section 4 ====
Round of 64
7	(Ukraine) Yana Shemyakina	15
58	(Switzerland) Tiffany Geroudet	11
39	(Hong Kong) Kong Man Wai	11
26	(Hungary) Edina Antal	15
23	(Italy) Mara Navarria	14
42	(Hungary) Julianna Révész	11
55	(Australia) Evelyn Halls	8
10	(China) Xu Anqi	15
15	(Romania) Simona Gherman	15
50	(Poland) Renata Knapik-Miazga	7
47	(Cuba) Yamilka Rodríguez Quesada	10
18	(France) Auriane Mallo	15
31	(Finland) Anna Salminen	4
34	(France) Coraline Vitalis	15
63	(Serbia) Danijela Ilić	6
2	(Hungary) Emese Szász	15

Round of 32
7	(Ukraine) Yana Shemyakina	15
26	(Hungary) Edina Antal	10
23	(Italy) Mara Navarria	4
10	(China) Xu Anqi	15
15	(Romania) Simona Gherman	15
18	(France) Auriane Mallo	11
34	(France) Coraline Vitalis	9
2	(Hungary) Emese Szász	15

Round of 16
7	(Ukraine) Yana Shemyakina	12
10	(China) Xu Anqi	15
15	(Romania) Simona Gherman	15
2	(Hungary) Emese Szász	8

Quarterfinals
10	(China) Xu Anqi	15
15	(Romania) Simona Gherman	10
