= 2010–11 Fencing World Cup =

International fencing competition

The 40th FIE Fencing World Cup began in October 2010 and concluded in August 2011 at the 2011 World Fencing Championships held in Catania, Italy.

== Individual Épée ==
Men
1	Paolo Pizzo (ITA)	173
2	Jörg Fiedler (GER)	171
3	Géza Imre (HUN)	167
4	Fabian Kauter (SUI)	156
5	Rubén Limardo (VEN)	144
6	Bas Verwijlen (NED)	142
7	Gauthier Grumier (FRA)	138
8	Max Heinzer (SUI)	131
9	Matteo Tagliariol (ITA)	128
10	Soren Thompson (USA)	109

Women
1	Sun Yujie (CHN)	173
2	Ana Maria Brânză (ROU)	156
3	Bianca Del Carretto (ITA)	155
4	Magdalena Piekarska (POL)	153
5	Yana Shemyakina (UKR)	146
6	Simona Gherman (ROU)	132
7	Anna Sivkova (RUS)	130
8	Tiffany Géroudet (SUI)	127
9	Laura Flessel-Colovic (FRA)	117
10	Monika Sozanska (GER)	112

== Individual Foil ==
Men
1	Andrea Cassarà (ITA)	273
2	Giorgio Avola (ITA)	186
3	Victor Sintès (FRA)	153
4	Valerio Aspromonte (ITA)	149
5	Andrea Baldini (ITA)	146
6	Alaaeldin Abouelkassem (EGY)	135
7	Erwann Le Péchoux (FRA)	128
8	Choi Byung-chul (KOR)	123
9	Aleksey Cheremisinov (RUS)	113
10	Lei Sheng (CHN)	113

Women
1	Elisa Di Francisca (ITA)	272
2	Valentina Vezzali (ITA)	266
3	Nam Hyun-hee (KOR)	212
4	Arianna Errigo (ITA)	146
5	Ilaria Salvatori (ITA)	131
6	Lee Kiefer (USA)	124
7	Evgeniya Lamonova (RUS)	121
8	Corinne Maîtrejean (FRA)	110
9	Aida Mohamed (HUN)	105
10	Inna Deriglazova (RUS)	96

== Individual Sabre ==
Men
1	Aleksey Yakimenko (RUS)	230
2	Aldo Montano (ITA)	218
3	Gu Bon-gil (KOR)	215
4	Nicolas Limbach (GER)	188
5	Won Woo-young (KOR)	158
6	Rareș Dumitrescu (ROU)	155
7	Áron Szilágyi (HUN)	142
8	Luigi Tarantino (ITA)	123
9	Julien Pillet (FRA)	115
10	Giampiero Pastore (ITA)	115

Women
1	Mariel Zagunis (USA)	267
2	Sofya Velikaya (RUS)	243
3	Olha Kharlan (UKR)	242
4	Yuliya Gavrilova (RUS)	189
5	Ekaterina Dyachenko (RUS)	174
6	Zhu Min (CHN)	153
7	Aleksandra Socha (POL)	126
8	Azza Besbes (TUN)	112
9	Irene Vecchi (ITA)	105
10	Gioia Marzocca (ITA)	105

== Team Épée ==
Men
1	France	380
2	Hungary	356
3	South Korea	312
4	United States	264
5	Russia	246
6	Italy	244
7	China	224
8	Switzerland	214
9	Germany	198
10	Venezuela	196

Women
1	Romania	360
2	China	358
3	Italy	308
4	Estonia	262
5	Germany	234
6	South Korea	233
7	Poland	223
8	France	216
9	United States	210
10	Ukraine	206

== Team Foil ==
Men
1	Italy	376
2	China	340
3	Japan	308
4	France	294
5	Russia	276
6	Germany	246
7	United States	226
8	South Korea	195
9	Poland	195
10	Great Britain	190

Women
1	Italy	448
2	Russia	324
3	France	320
4	South Korea	292
5	United States	225
6	Poland	222
7	China	213
8	Canada	205
9	Germany	202
10	Hungary	201

== Team Sabre ==
Men
1	Russia	388
2	Italy	332
3	South Korea	328
4	Germany	264
5	Romania	260
6	United States	256
7	Hungary	238
8	Belarus	203
9	Ukraine	192
10	France	189

Women
1	Russia	412
2	Ukraine	364
3	United States	332
4	Italy	304
5	South Korea	247
6	Poland	232
7	China	217
8	France	206
9	Mexico	186
10	Hungary	180
