= Iuliana Măceșeanu =

Romanian fencer

Personal information
- Born: 7 July 1981 (age 45) Craiova, Romania
- Home town: London

Fencing career
- Sport: Fencing
- Weapon: épée
- Hand: right-handed
- National coach: Dan Podeanu
- Club: CSA Steaua București
- FIE ranking: former ranking
Medal record
Women's épée
Representing Romania
European Championships
Gold medal – first place	2006 İzmir	Team épée
Gold medal – first place	2008 Kyiv	Team épée
Gold medal – first place	2009 Plovdiv	Team épée
Bronze medal – third place	2005 Zalaegerszeg	Épée

Iuliana Măceșeanu (born 7 July 1981) is a Romanian épée fencer, bronze medallist at the 2005 European Championships and three-time team European champion (2006, 2008, and 2009).

== Career ==
Măceșeanu took up fencing at CSM Craiova when she was twelve years old. She was accompanying her younger brother to his gymnastics class and wanted to try the sport too, but the coach thought her frame was too big and directed her to the fencing hall which stood across the park.

Măceșeanu joined the junior national team in 1999 and transferred to CSA Steaua in Bucharest under the coaching of Cornel Milan. With Loredana Iordăchioiu and Ana Maria Brânză she won a team silver medal in the 2001 Junior World Championships in Gdańsk. In the senior category, she climbed her first World Cup podium with a silver medal in the 2003 Budapest Grand Prix, followed by a quarter-final place in the Prague World Cup.

At the 2005 European Championships in Zalaegerszeg, Măceșeanu reached the semi-finals where she was edged out 14–15 by Ukraine's Yana Shemyakina and took a bronze medal, which she considers the highlight of her career. The next season she reached the quarter-finals at the 2006 European Championships in İzmir. In the team event, Măceșeanu, Brânză, Iordăchioiu and Anca Măroiu prevailed 45–43 over Russia, then edged out Hungary 33–32 to win the gold medal. At the World Championships in Turin, Măceșeanu made it again to the quarter-finals before losing 15–11 to Estonia's Irina Embrich. This result allowed her to finish the 2005–06 season No.36 in world rankings, her career best.

The 2006–07 season proved disappointing both for Măceșeanu and the team, with Romania finishing 10th at the World Championships in Saint-Petersburg. Măceșeanu did not qualify for the 2008 Summer Olympics, but she took part in the World Championships held in Beijing for events not in the Olympic programme. She was eliminated in the first round at the European Championships in Kyiv. In the team event, Măceșeanu, Brânză, Iordăchioiu and Simona Alexandru overcame Hungary in the semi-finals, then crushed favourites Germany in the final to earn Măceșeanu's second European title.

In 2009 Măceșeanu moved to London with her partner and took a job as fencing coach at the London Fencing Club, returning to Romania to train with the national team before major competitions. At the European Championships in Plovdiv, she lost in the table of 32 to her captain Ana Brânză. In the team event, Romania retained their European title after defeating Germany again, this time in the semi-finals, then winning over Poland. Their medal hopes for the World Championships in Antalya were however cut short. In the individual event, Măceșeanu lost in the first round to Anfisa Pochkalova of Ukraine. Weakened by an injured Brânză, Romania were edged out 32–31 by Italy and finished 5th.

In the 2009–10 season Romania lost to France in the quarter-finals of the European Championships in Legnano and finished 5th.She was replaced by Loredana Iordăchioiu for the World Championships in Paris, at which Romania won the first women's épée world title in their history. Iuliana Maceseanu retired from her fencing career and stopped taking part in international competitions in 2011.
