= Women's team épée at the 2010 World Fencing Championships =

The women's team épée took place on November 12 at the Grand Palais.

== Epée team ==
Position	Country	Name
1.	Romania	Simona Alexandru; Ana Maria Brânză; Loredana Iordăchioiu; Anca Măroiu
2.	Germany	Imke Duplitzer; Britta Heidemann; Ricarda Multerer; Monika Sozanska
3.	South Korea	Jung Hyo-jung; Oh Yun-hee; Park Se-ra; Shin A-lam
4.	China	Sun Yujie; Xu Anqi; Luo Xiaojuan; Yin Mingfang
5.	France	Hajnalka Kiraly; Laura Flessel-Colovic; Maureen Nisima; Nathalie Alibert
6.	Russia	Violetta Kolobova; Tatiana Logunova; Olga Kochneva; Tatyana Andryushina
7.	Poland	Danuta Dmowska-Andrzejuk; Małgorzata Bereza; Ewa Nelip; Magdalena Piekarska
8.	Estonia	Julia Zuikova; Kristina Kuusk; Irina Embrich; Julia Beljajeva

Quarter-finals
Poland	28
South Korea	45
France	40
Romania	45
Germany	28
Russia	27
China	45
Estonia	32

Semi-finals
South Korea	31
Romania	45
Germany	34
China	28

Final
Romania	35
Germany	26
Third place
South Korea	45
China	37
