= Women's team épée at the 2015 World Fencing Championships =

The Women's team épée event of the 2015 World Fencing Championships was held on 17–18 July 2015.

== Medalists ==
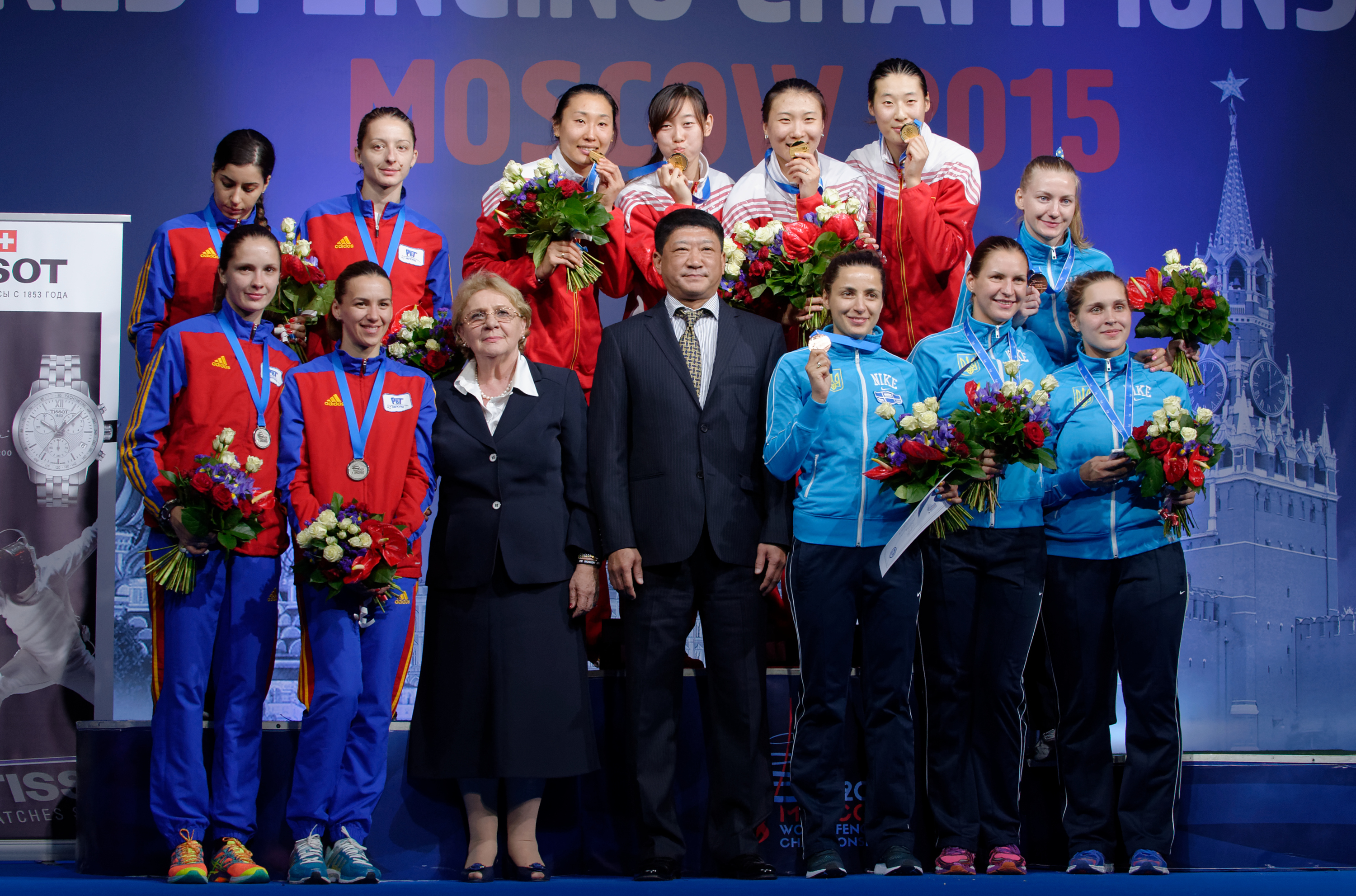
From left to right, Romania, China and Ukraine

Gold	China; Hao Jialu; Sun Yujie; Sun Yiwen; Xu Anqi
Silver	Romania; Ana Maria Brânză; Loredana Dinu; Simona Gherman; Simona Pop
Bronze	Ukraine; Olena Kryvytska; Kseniya Pantelyeyeva; Anfisa Pochkalova; Yana Shemyakina

== Draw ==
=== Finals ===
Final
China	45
Romania	36

Third place
France	42
Ukraine	44

=== Top half ===
Round of 32
Canada	45
Hong Kong	41
France	40
Finland	38
Chinese Taipei	28
South Korea	38
China	45
Dominican Republic	33
Australia	25
Germany	45
Poland	44
Israel	39
Colombia	21
Russia	45

Round of 16
Italy	45
Canada	24
France	44
South Korea	32
China	43
Germany	42
Poland	22
Russia	38

Quarterfinals
Italy	35
France	45
China	43
Russia	34

Semifinals
France	29
China	45

=== Bottom half ===
Round of 32
Estonia	45
Spain	23
Japan	44
Venezuela	43
Ukraine	45
Kazakhstan	29
Egypt	23
Sweden	45
United States	37
Cuba	30
Argentina	35
Hungary	45
Switzerland	45
South Africa	23
Turkey	15
Romania	45

Round of 16
Estonia	41
Japan	45
Ukraine	45
Sweden	41
United States	29
Hungary	30
Switzerland	19
Romania	45

Quarterfinals
Japan	36
Ukraine	37
Hungary	13
Romania	22

Semifinals
Ukraine	24
Romania	27

=== Placement rounds ===
==== 5–8th place ====
5–8th place semifinals
Italy	29
Russia	45
Japan	44
Hungary	45

Fifth place
Russia	17
Hungary	18
Seventh place
Italy	45
Japan	32

==== 9–16th place ====
9–16th place quarterfinals
Canada	37
South Korea	45
Germany	42
Poland	36
Estonia	45
Sweden	30
United States	45
Switzerland	42

9–12th place semifinals
South Korea	28
Germany	23
Estonia	45
United States	28

Ninth place
South Korea	32
Estonia	41
Eleventh place
Germany	37
United States	40

==== 13–16th place ====
13–16th place semifinals
Canada	32
Poland	45
Sweden	32
Switzerland	45

13th place
Poland	45
Switzerland	32
15th place
Canada	27
Sweden	45

== Final classification ==
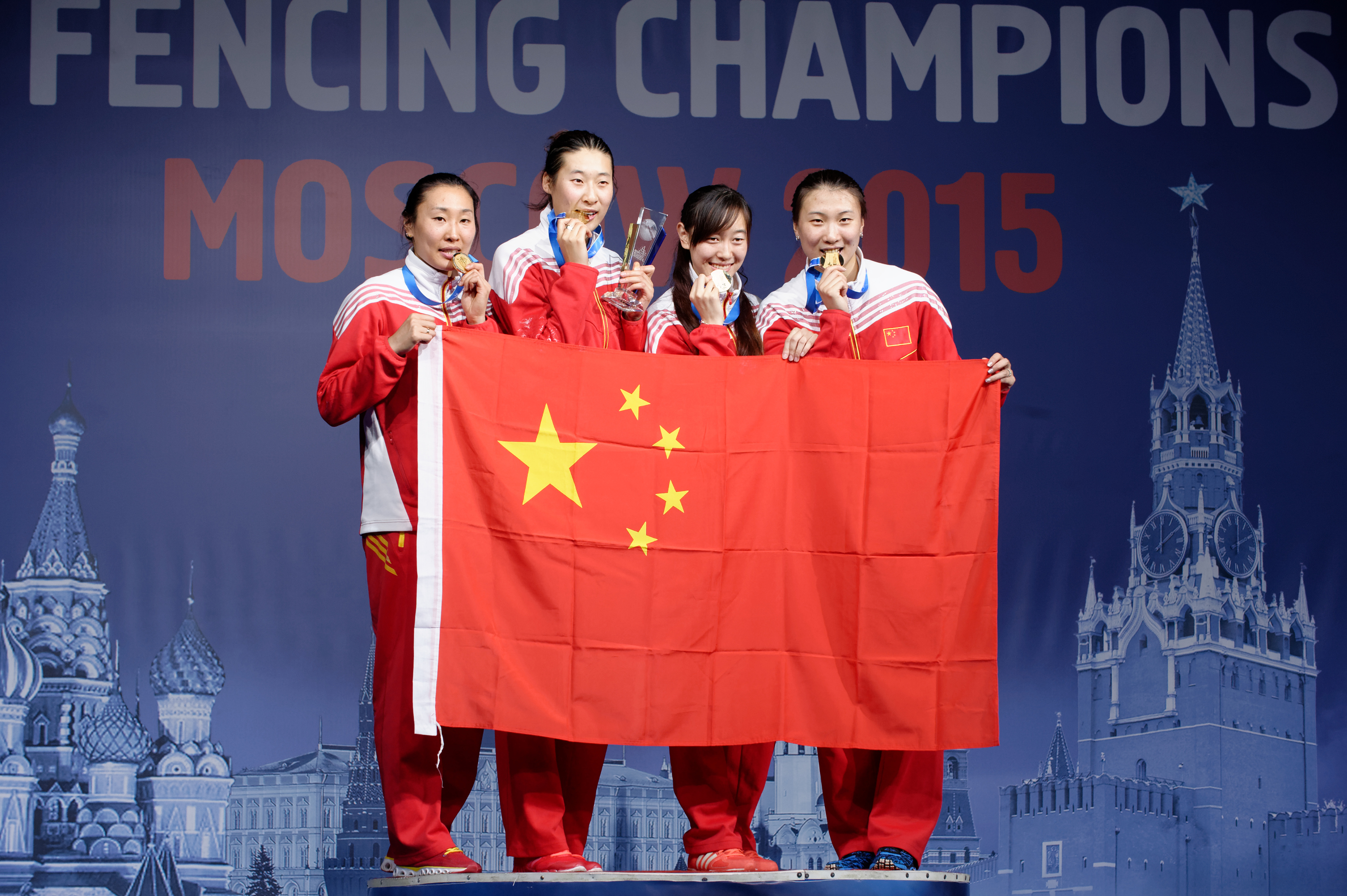
2015 World champions, China

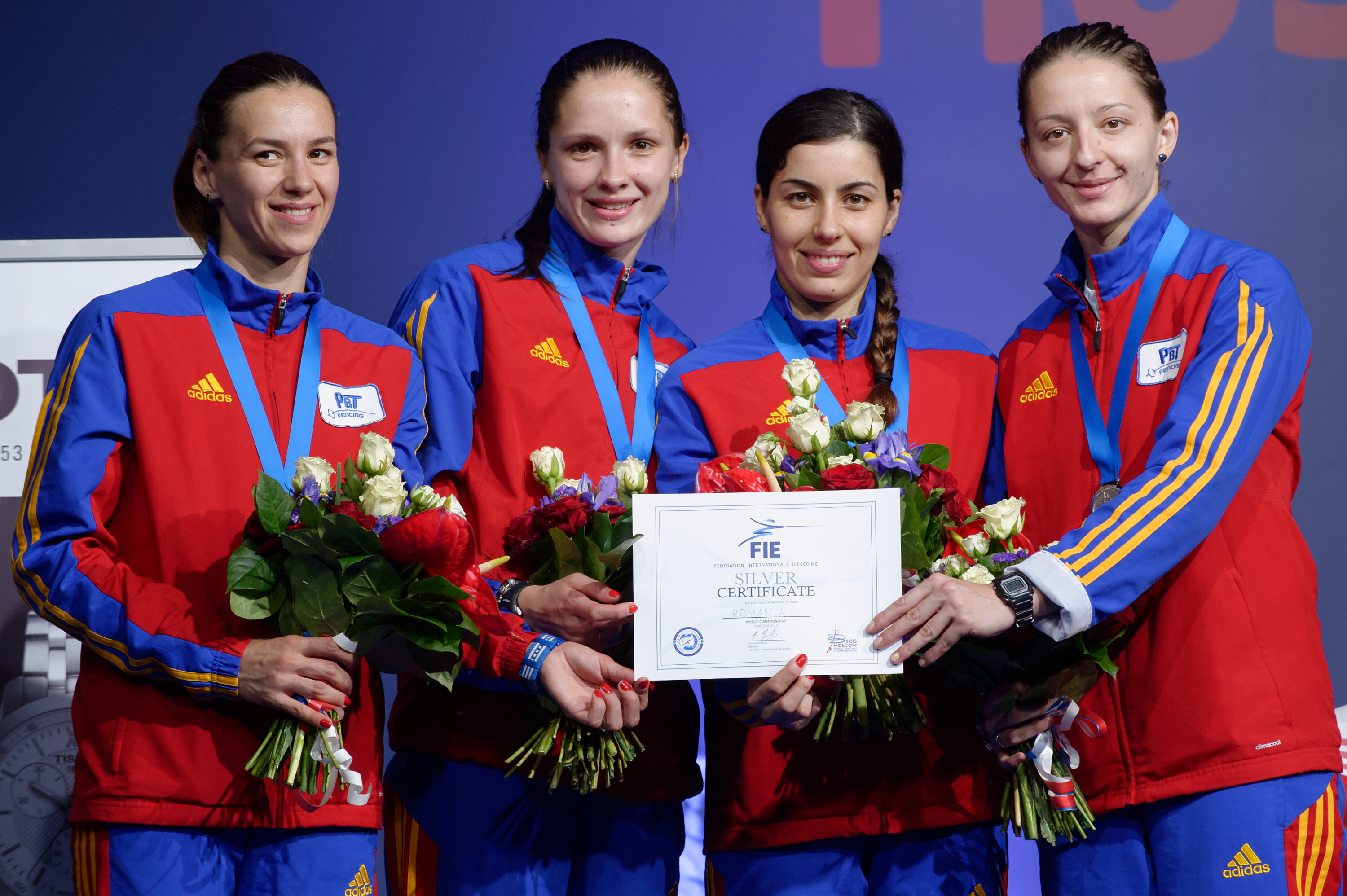
2015 silver medallists, Romania

Rank	Nation
1st place, gold medalist(s)	China
2nd place, silver medalist(s)	Romania
3rd place, bronze medalist(s)	Ukraine
4	France
5	Hungary
6	Russia
7	Italy
8	Japan
9	Estonia
10	South Korea
11	United States
12	Germany
13	Poland
14	Switzerland
15	Sweden
16	Canada
17	Venezuela
18	Hong Kong
19	South Africa
20	Israel
21	Australia
22	Kazakhstan
23	Argentina
24	Finland
25	Chinese Taipei
26	Cuba
27	Egypt
28	Dominican Republic
29	Colombia
30	Spain
31	Turkey
