= Women's team épée at the 2011 World Fencing Championships =

The Women's team épée event of the 2011 World Fencing Championships took place on October 16, 2011.

== Medalists ==
1st place, gold medalist(s)	Romania; Anca Măroiu; Loredana Dinu; Simona Alexandru; Ana Maria Brânză
2nd place, silver medalist(s)	China; Luo Xiaojuan; Li Na; Sun Yujie; Xu Anqi
3rd place, bronze medalist(s)	Italy; Rossella Fiamingo; Mara Navarria; Nathalie Moellhausen; Bianca Del Carretto

== Draw ==
=== Finals ===
Semifinals
Romania	24
Germany	23
Italy	38
China	42

Final
Romania	27
China	26
Third place
Germany	33
Italy	45

=== Top half ===
Round of 32
Romania
Bye
Hong Kong	35
United Kingdom	45
Russia	45
Colombia	21
Israel	41
Poland	44
South Korea	45
Argentina	27
Chinese Taipei	30
Ukraine	45
Sweden	45
Mexico	35
Netherlands	22
Germany	45

Round of 16
Romania	45
United Kingdom	23
Russia	40
Poland	41
South Korea	45
Ukraine	41
Sweden	31
Germany	45

Quarterfinals
Romania	37
Poland	33
South Korea	23
Germany	27

Semifinals
Romania	24
Germany	23

=== Bottom half ===
Round of 32
Italy	45
Lithuania	22
Brazil	27
Canada	42
Hungary	45
Kyrgyzstan	19
Kazakhstan	23
Estonia	45
France	0
Algeria	0
Venezuela	27
United States	45
Japan	45
South Africa	17
Cuba	28
China	42

Round of 16
Italy	45
Canada	39
Hungary	34
Estonia	35
France	45
United States	26
Japan	22
China	45

Quarterfinals
Italy	45
Estonia	19
France	43
China	45

Semifinals
Italy	38
China	42

=== Placement matches ===
==== 5–8th place ====
5–8th place semifinals
Poland	35
South Korea	30
Estonia	45
France	41

Fifth place
Poland	31
Estonia	45
Seventh place
South Korea	40
France	38

==== 9–12th place ====
9–16th place quarterfinals
United Kingdom	40
Russia	45
Ukraine	45
Sweden	30
Canada	38
Hungary	45
'United States	42
Japan	28

9–12th place semifinals
Russia	45
Ukraine	32
Hungary	45
United States	32

Ninth place
Russia	32
Hungary	31
11th place
Ukraine	45
United States	39

==== 13–16th place ====
13–16th place semifinals
United Kingdom	45
Sweden	39
Canada	45
Japan	43

13th place
United Kingdom	44
Canada	45
15th place
Sweden	45
Japan	36
