= Fencing at the 2016 Summer Olympics – Women's team épée =

Women's team épée at the Games of the XXXI Olympiad
- Venue: Carioca Arena 3
- Date: 11 August 2016
- Competitors: 36 from 9 nations

Medalists
1st place, gold medalist(s)		Loredana Dinu; Simona Gherman; Simona Pop; Ana Maria Popescu	Romania
2nd place, silver medalist(s)		Hao Jialu; Sun Yiwen; Sun Yujie; Xu Anqi	China
3rd place, bronze medalist(s)		Olga Kochneva; Violetta Kolobova; Tatiana Logunova; Lyubov Shutova	Russia

The women's team épée competition in fencing at the 2016 Summer Olympics in Rio de Janeiro was held on 11 August at the Carioca Arena 3.

The medals were presented by Octavian Morariu, IOC member, Romania and Ana Derșidan-Ene-Pascu, Vice President of the FIE.

== Schedule ==
All times are Brasília time (UTC−3)

Date	Time	Round
Thursday, 11 August 2016	09:00	Round of 16
Thursday, 11 August 2016	10:30	Quarter-finals
Thursday, 11 August 2016	12:00	Placement 5-8
Thursday, 11 August 2016	13:15	Semi-finals
Thursday, 11 August 2016	14:30	Placement 5-6
Thursday, 11 August 2016	14:30	Placement 7-8
Thursday, 11 August 2016	17:00	Bronze medal match
Thursday, 11 August 2016	18:30	Final

== Draw ==
=== Finals ===
Round of 16
Brazil	32
Ukraine	45

Quarter-finals
China	42
Ukraine	34
South Korea	26
Estonia	27
Russia	44
France	41
United States	23
Romania	24

Semi-finals
China	45
Estonia	36
Russia	31
Romania	45

Finals
China	38
Romania	44
Third place
Estonia	31
Russia	37

=== Classification 5–8 ===
Placement 5–8
Ukraine	34
South Korea	45
France	28
United States	32

Placement 5–6
South Korea	18
United States	22
Placement 7–8
Ukraine	38
France	45

== Final classification ==
Rank	Team	Athlete
1st place, gold medalist(s)	Romania	Loredana Dinu; Simona Gherman; Simona Pop; Ana Maria Popescu
2nd place, silver medalist(s)	China	Hao Jialu; Sun Yiwen; Sun Yujie; Xu Anqi
3rd place, bronze medalist(s)	Russia	Olga Kochneva; Violetta Kolobova; Tatiana Logunova; Lyubov Shutova
4	Estonia	Julia Beljajeva; Irina Embrich; Erika Kirpu; Kristina Kuusk
5	United States	Katharine Holmes; Courtney Hurley; Kelley Hurley; Katarzyna Trzopek
6	South Korea	Choi Eun-sook; Choi In-jeong; Kang Young-mi; Shin A-lam
7	France	Marie-Florence Candassamy; Josephine Jacques Coquin; Auriane Mallo; Lauren Rembi
8	Ukraine	Olena Kryvytska; Kseniya Pantelyeyeva; Anfisa Pochkalova; Yana Shemyakina
9	Brazil	Amanda Simeão; Nathalie Moellhausen; Rayssa Costa; Katherine Miller
