= Anca Măroiu =

Romanian fencer (born 1983)

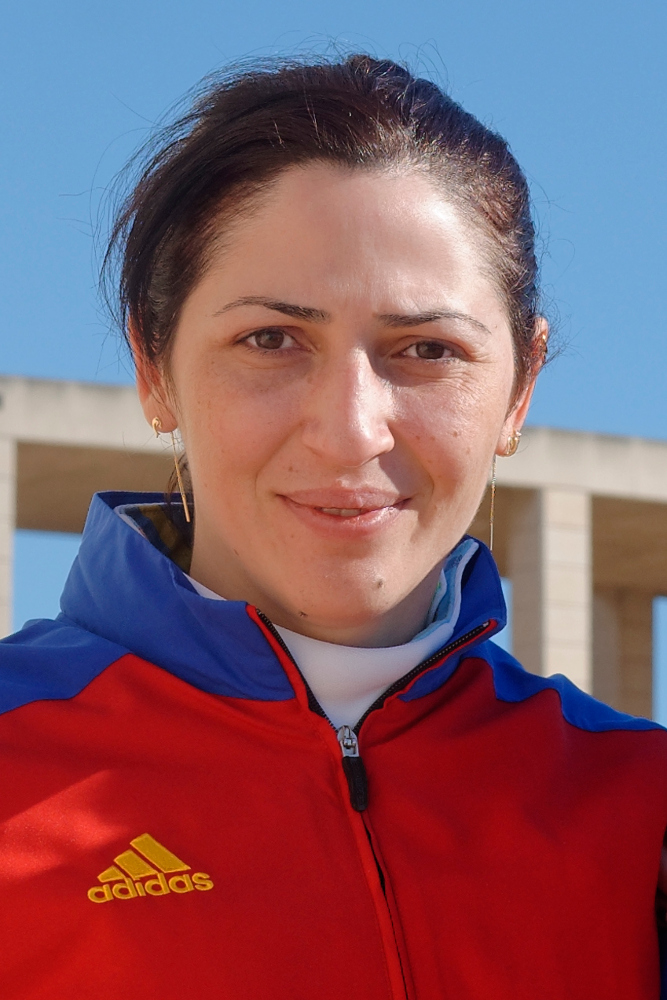
- Maroiu in 2015

Personal information
- Full name: Anca Băcioiu-Măroiu
- Born: 5 August 1983 (age 42) Craiova, Romania
- Height: 1.74 m (5 ft 9 in)
- Weight: 68 kg (150 lb)

Fencing career
- Sport: Fencing
- Country: Romania
- Weapon: Épée
- Hand: Right-handed
- National coach: Dan Podeanu
- Club: Steaua București
- Assistant coach: Gheorghe Epurescu
- FIE ranking: current ranking
Medal record
Women's épée fencing
Representing Romania
World Championships
Gold medal – first place	2010 Paris	Team épée
Gold medal – first place	2011 Catania	Team épée
Bronze medal – third place	2011 Catania	Individual épée
European Championships
Gold medal – first place	2006 İzmir	Team épée
Gold medal – first place	2008 Kyiv	Team épée
Gold medal – first place	2011 Sheffield	Team épée
Silver medal – second place	2012 Legnano	Individual épée
Bronze medal – third place	2006 İzmir	Individual épée

Anca Măroiu (née Băcioiu, born 5 August 1983) is a Romanian épée fencer. She is double team world champion, in 2010 and 2011, silver medallist at the 2012 European Fencing Championships and three-time European team champion (2006, 2009 and 2011).

== Career ==
Măroiu first took up gymnastics, but found herself too tall in primary school. She switched to fencing, learning under Nicolae Mihăilescu, then Mircea Alecu. Being of a combative temperament, she chose épée, the weapon of the duel. When she was 14 years old she was selected into the national training centre for juniors within the Petrache Trișcu sports high school in Craiova under Dan Podeanu's coaching.

She won the team bronze medal at the 2002 Junior European Championships in Conegliano. At the 2006 European Championships in İzmir she reached the semifinals, where she was defeated by Germany's Claudia Bokel and came away with a bronze medal. In the team event, Romania overcame the Czech Republic, Estonia and Russia. They defeated Hungary by a single hit in the final, winning the first European title in the history of Romanian épée fencing. They won the European Championships again in 2009 and 2011.

With Ana Maria Brânză, Loredana Dinu and Simona Gherman, Măroiu won the 2010 World Championships in Paris after they defeated Germany in the final. The following year, she reached the semifinals in the individual event, but lost on priority to Li Na of China. In the team event Romania retained their crown after prevailing over China in the final.

In 2012, Măroiu reached the final at the European Championships in Legnano. She could not win against teammate Gherman and came away with a silver medal. She competed in the 2012 Summer Olympics. After seeing off Ukraine's Olena Kryvytska and Russia's Anna Sivkova she fell to South Korea's Shin A-lam in the quarter-finals. In the team event, top seeded Romania suffered a surprise defeat to South Korea and finished sixth after the placement matches. After this failure she, Gherman and Dinu decided to take a break in their career to look after their families.

In 2014, Măroiu gave birth to a son, Petre Luca. She announced her return to competition in early 2015.
