= Ana Maria Popescu =

Romanian épée fencer

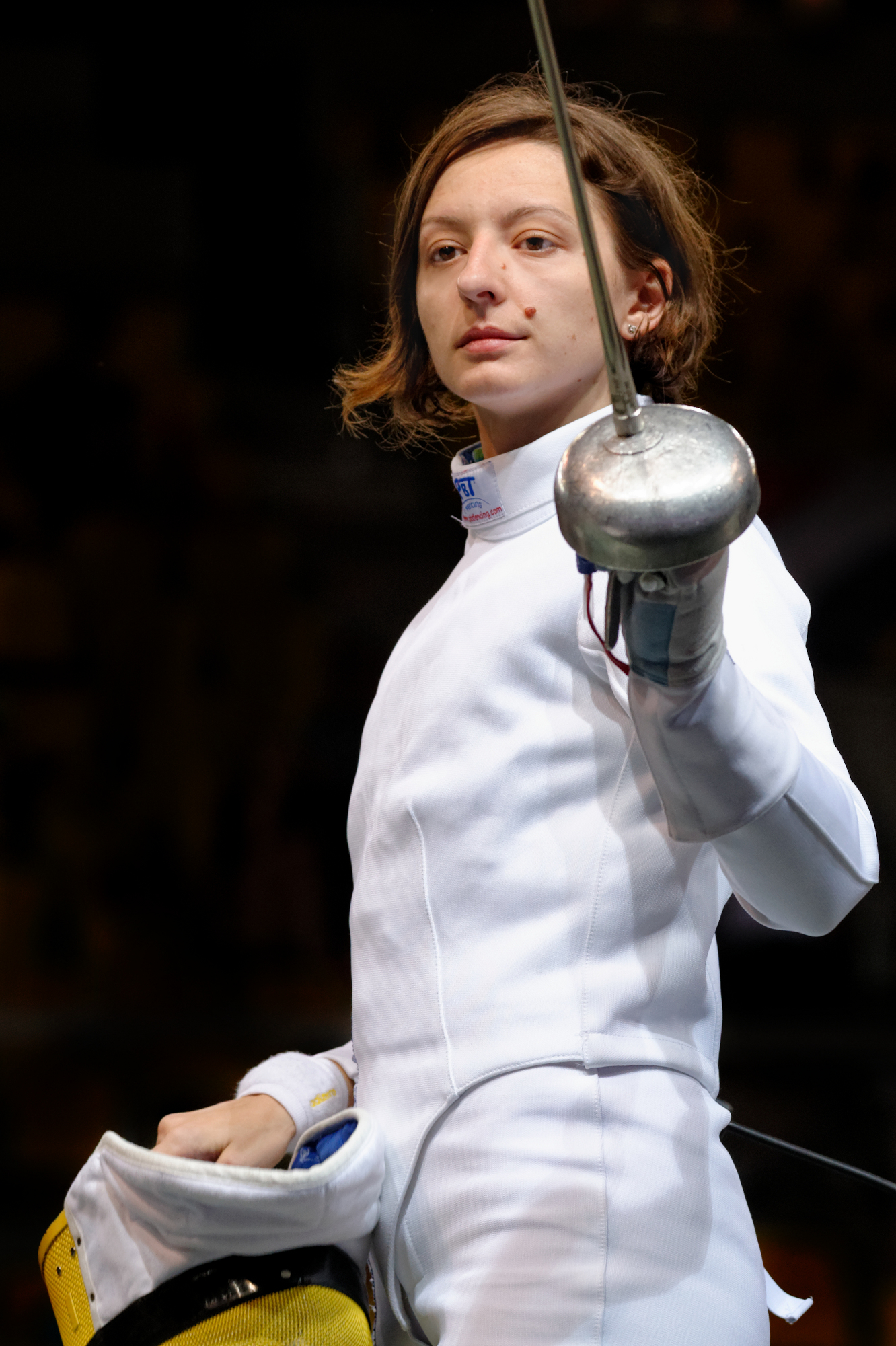
- Popescu at the 2014 European Fencing Championships

Personal information
- Full name: Ana Maria Florentina Brânză
- Nicknames: Brânzica (and variants Brînzi, Brînzici)
- Born: 26 November 1984 (age 41) Bucharest, Romania
- Height: 1.75 m (5 ft 9 in)
- Weight: 63 kg (139 lb)

Fencing career
- Sport: Fencing
- Country: Romania
- Weapon: Épée
- Hand: Left-handed
- National coach: Dan Podeanu
- Club: CSA Steaua București
- Head coach: Gheorghe Epurescu, Cornel Milan
- Former coach: Octavian Zidaru
- FIE ranking
Medal record
Event	1st	2nd	3rd
Olympic Games	1	2	0
World Championships	2	2	3
European Championships	7	4	2
World Cup (individual)	13	10	10
Olympic Games
Gold medal – first place	2016 Rio de Janeiro	Team épée
Silver medal – second place	2008 Beijing	Individual épée
Silver medal – second place	2020 Tokyo	Individual épée
World Championships
Gold medal – first place	2010 Paris	Team épée
Gold medal – first place	2011 Catania	Team épée
Silver medal – second place	2015 Moscow	Team épée
Silver medal – second place	2018 Wuxi	Individual épée
Bronze medal – third place	2002 Lisbon	Individual épée
Bronze medal – third place	2011 Catania	Individual épée
Bronze medal – third place	2013 Budapest	Team épée
European Games
Gold medal – first place	2015 Baku	Individual épée
Gold medal – first place	2015 Baku	Team épée
European Championships
Gold medal – first place	2006 İzmir	Team épée
Gold medal – first place	2008 Kyiv	Team épée
Gold medal – first place	2009 Plovdiv	Team épée
Gold medal – first place	2011 Sheffield	Team épée
Gold medal – first place	2013 Zagreb	Individual épée
Gold medal – first place	2014 Strasbourg	Team épée
Gold medal – first place	2015 Montreux	Team épée
Silver medal – second place	2008 Kyiv	Individual épée
Silver medal – second place	2012 Legnano	Team épée
Silver medal – second place	2013 Zagreb	Team épée
Silver medal – second place	2016 Toruń	Individual épée
Bronze medal – third place	2011 Sheffield	Individual épée
Bronze medal – third place	2016 Toruń	Team épée

Ana Maria Popescu, formerly known as Ana Maria Brânză (Romanian pronunciation: [ˈana maˈri.a ˈbrɨnzə]; born 26 November 1984), is a Romanian left-handed épée fencer.

Popescu is a four-time team European champion, 2013 individual European champion, and two-time team world champion.

A five-time Olympian, Popescu is a two-time individual Olympic silver medalist and 2016 team Olympic champion.

== Personal life ==
Popescu was born in 1984 in the Rahova district of Bucharest, the second of two children. A very energetic child, she was pushed by her parents towards sport. She first tried tennis because the courts were not far from home, but she left after one year because she was the only left-handed player and because of the lack of competitive events. When she was ten, her elder brother Marius, who played football for a school team of CSA Steaua București, took her to his club's fencing hall in Ghencea. She did not care much for the idea at first, as she was not a fan of The Three Musketeers, but she was attracted to the sport as soon as she set foot in the fencing hall. She turned to épée because there was no other left-handed weapon available in the club when she began training.

Popescu became the champion of Romania for her age group after only six months of training. She was noticed by national coach Dan Podeanu, who after a trial selected her for centralized training. At 13 years old, at the beginning of class VIII, she left her family and moved to Craiova to train at the Junior Olympic Centre for épée with other athletes, most of whom were older than her. She pursued her studies at the Petrache-Trișcu Sports High School, which later named one of its alleys after her. The high school offers a specific curriculum for young athletes with three or four class hours a day, the rest being devoted to sport, but the sports facilities were in a rather run-down state in post-Ceaușescu Romania. Because of the lack of a dedicated building, they first held their training sessions in the community hall of the high school. As there was no locker room, they had to change behind curtains.

After her bacalaureat she was offered an athletic scholarship from an American university, but she chose to stay in Romania. She first hoped to study psychology at university, before setting for the Faculty of sports and physical education of the University of Craiova, where she obtained a master in 2007. The same year she was awarded the title of master emeritus in sports (Maestru Emerit al Sportului).

She joined in 2001 one of the main Romanian sport clubs, CSA Steaua, which is run by the Ministry of National Defence of Romania, and received the grade of sergeant. She is however under no military obligation and is seconded full-time to her sport. Being from a military family–her grandfather, father and brother served in the army–, she regularly appears in uniform in the media. She was promoted to lieutenant after her studies, and as of 2015 holds the grade of major.

Popescu supports AITA, an association for autistic children in Bucharest. From September 2013 to November 2014 she ran the campaign Aleargă de ziua ta! ("run on your birthday") which encouraged people to celebrate their birthday by engaging in physical activity and gathering funds for a charitable cause.

Popescu voice acted in the Romanian language dub of the movie Rise of the Guardians.

In August 2015, she married Pavel Popescu, who plays water polo for CSA Steaua, and announced her intention to change her name for competition.

== Career ==
=== 2001–2004 ===
Popescu won her first senior national championship at the age of fifteen. She attended her first international competitions as a member of CSM–LPS Craiova. She took part in the 1999 Cadet World Championships in Keszthely, finishing only 28th, but the confrontation with fencers from countries with better training conditions spurred her to train harder: "I saw kids from France wearing immaculate white outfits, while I had a yellowed kit and sneakers ripped up at the toe. But I went after them to defeat them."

She joined in 2001 the fencing section of CSA Steaua under coach Cornel Milan. The same year she posted her first significant result with a gold medal at the Cadet World Championships and a team silver medal at the Junior World Championships, both in Gdańsk. These achievements prompted the Romanian media to compare her to Olympic foil champion Laura Badea-Cârlescu, but she took exception to the comparison, claiming she wanted to do better than Badea.

In 2002, Popescu won the gold medal at the Junior World Championships in Antalya after prevailing over China's Tan Li. She was praised for "a remarkable tactical mastery for a seventeen and a half year old girl". The same year she took part in her first senior major competitions. At the European Championships in Moscow she reached the quarter-finals before being eliminated 9–15 by Lyubov Shutova. At the World Championships in Lisbon she made it to the semi-finals, where she was defeated 6–15 by Germany's Imke Duplitzer and came away with a bronze medal. She would later call it her fondest victory, because she was very young at the time and was there without her coach, with only her sabre colleagues as companions.

Having reached the top quickly, she lost her previous fearlessness and began to feel apprehensive before her bouts: "When you get on the piste, it looks to you like your opponent is out to steal your dreams." She struggled throughout the 2002–03 season, managing only a quarter-finals finish in Prague. A double gold medal haul at the Junior European Fencing in Poreč helped her overcome the hurdle. That season saw also the first apparition of the Romanian women's épée team in senior competitions, namely the 2003 World Fencing Championships, where they finished 8th.

In April 2004, she won the Junior World Championships again after defeating Bianca Del Carretto 15–14 in the final. She reached the quarter-finals in the senior European Championships in Copenhagen. She qualified for the 2004 Summer Olympics by earning a silver medal at the zonal qualifying tournament in Ghent, seeing off top-seed Sophie Lamon of Switzerland in the table of 16, but losing in the final to Sonja Tol of the Netherlands. For her Olympic début in Athens, Popescu managed to beat experienced fencer Adrienn Hormay of Hungary, but stumbled in the table of 16 against China's Zhang Li and finished 16th. She later explained she felt overwhelmed by the Olympic experience and like a child lost amongst big-name athletes.

=== 2004–2008 ===
In the 2004–05 season, she reached her first podium in the Fencing World Cup with a silver medal at the Budapest Grand Prix. This result, along with a quarter-final place at the 2005 World Championships in Leipzig, where she lost to Estonia's Maarika Võsu, allowed her to close the season in the Top 10 for the first time in her career. The next season she won her first World Cup title in Budapest and posted four top-eight finishes. At the European Championships in İzmir she was defeated in the second round by teammate Iuliana Măceșeanu. In the team event Romania prevailed 45–43 over Russia and met Hungary in the final. Brânză defeated Tímea Nagy in the last leg, allowing Romania to edge out a 33–32 win. This victory over a double Olympic champion encouraged her to think she could become a champion in her own right. She reached the quarter-finals again at the 2006 World Championships in Turin, but yielded to Nagy this time.

In the 2007–08 season, Popescu claimed the gold medal at the St Petersburg World Cup, the silver in Budapest and Havana, and the bronze in Luxembourg and Barcelona. She climbed to the second place in world rankings, gaining qualification to the women's individual épée event of the 2008 Summer Olympics– women's team épée did not feature on the Olympic programme for that edition. The 2008 European Championships held in Kyiv in July were the last rehearsal before the Olympic Games. Popescu reached the semi-finals, where she saw off Russia's Anna Sivkova. In the final she lost 15–10 to Hormay, whom she had defeated at the Athens Olympics, and came away with the silver–her first individual European medal. In the team event Romania overcame Poland and Hungary, then largely prevailed over Germany in the final to earn their second continental title.

In August, the Romanian delegation arrived in Beijing two weeks ahead of the competition. Being the only Romanian epeeist at the Games, she trained with foilists Cristina Stahl and Virgil Sălișcan. As No.2 seed she received a bye in the first round. She then disposed 15–11 of Japan's Megumi Harada and beat 15–13 Russia's Lyubov Shutova to reach the semi-finals, where she met experienced, 39-year-old Ildikó Mincza-Nébald of Hungary. After a very balanced bout where no fencer managed to gain more than a two-hit advantage, Popescu struck the decisive hit to win her ticket to the final. After a brief respite, she met world No.1 Britta Heidemann of Germany, who acquired an early four-hit lead. Popescu rallied to 10–12 in the third and last period, but the German struck three hits in a row, closing the bout 11–15 with a double touche. Popescu attributed Heidemann's victory to her superior physical condition, explaining that the German had "fenced like a man".

For her silver medal, Popescu was awarded the Romanian order for sports merit (Ordinul "Meritul Sportiv"), second class. She finished first in the overall women's épée World Cup for two consecutive seasons, 2007–2008 and 2008–2009. She was designated a member of the athletes commission of the International Fencing Federation by its executive committee for the period 2009–2013.

=== 2008–2012 ===
After the Olympics, Popescu began to complain of tendon pain in her weapon hand, but the competition rhythm did not allow her to attend to it. At the 2009 European Championships in Plovdiv she was defeated in the second round by fellow Romanian Anca Măroiu, but secured her third continental team title after Romania defeated successively Russia, Germany and Poland. Teammate Simona Gherman jokingly referred to the team as the "Power Praf girls", after the Powerpuff Girls anime, because of the hardships of the match against Russia. The nickname stuck. They would later incorporate it in their pre-match battle cry: "We're the Powerpuff Girls and we'll make mincemeat of you!" (Romanian: Suntem fetițele PowerPraf și am venit să vă facem pilaf!)

Popescu was rested for the Romanian national championships to spare her hand. She arrived with a No.1 ranking to the World Championships in Antalya, but warned beforehand that she was only fencing at 50 to 60% of her ability due to her wrist problems. She was eliminated 9–10 in the table of 16 by Canada's Sherraine Schalm. Romania were defeated in the first round by Italy, again by a single hit, and finished sixth after the placement matches.

After this failure, Popescu resolved to address her wrist issues. Medical investigations in Romania and in France showed that her condition was operable, but that the surgery would likely end her fencing career. She chose instead to take a break in her career to follow a strict recovery program. After a pause of several months, she earned a gold medal in her first two competitions, the Florina and Nanjing 2010 World Cup events. Up to 2012 she suffered from left-wrist pains and had to get medical attention after each competition.

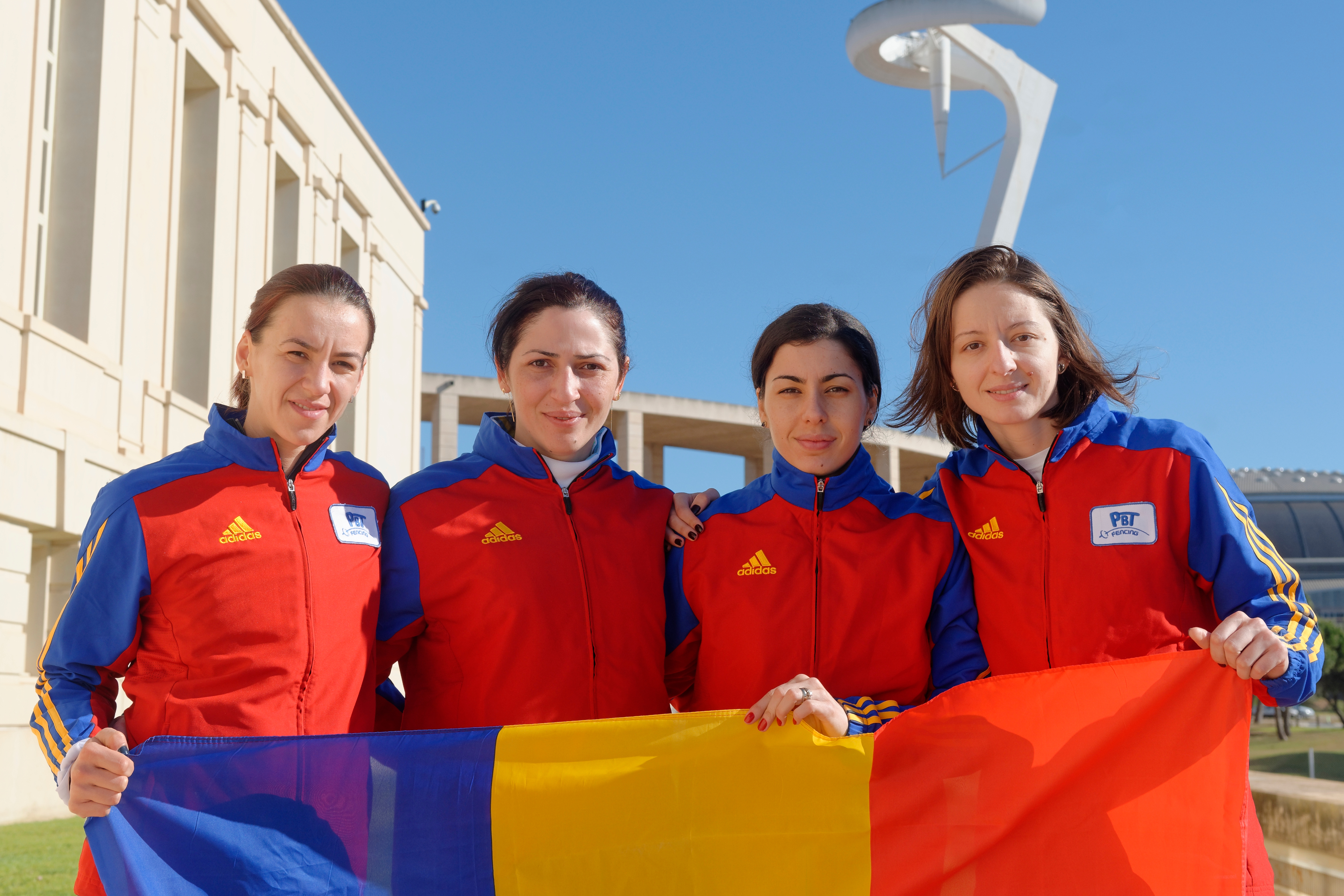
The twice-world champion "Power Praf" girls: from L to R, Gherman, Măroiu, Dinu, and Popescu

In the 2010 World Fencing Championships in Paris, Popescu was again eliminated early in the individual event, but won the first Romanian team gold in épée with Simona Gherman, Loredana Dinu and Anca Măroiu. Popescu contributed more than half the hits scored by Romania in the final against Germany. Her last relay against Imke Duplitzer, which she won 18–10, was described as "a real example of technique and tactical intelligence" in an otherwise "quite monotonous" match.

In 2011, Popescu took the bronze medal in the individual event of the 2011 European Fencing Championships in Sheffield and the gold medal in the team event after defeating Russia 45–31. The victory ceremony was marred by an incident when Trei culori, the former, communist-era national anthem of Romania, was played instead of the current Deșteaptă-te, române! Brânză decided to walk off in protest and convinced her teammates of following her.

At the 2011 World Fencing Championships in Catania, Popescu was stopped in the semifinals by Sun Yujie of China and was doomed to a bronze medal, the second World Championships medal in her career. In the team event, the "Power Praf girls" saw off easily Great Britain then Poland, but Popescu was hit on her weapon hand during the quarter-finals against Poland and had to get medical attention. She fenced with a bandaged hand and only one relay in the semifinal against Germany, which Romania won with a tight score of 24–23. She was to be rested during the final against China, but was called eventually to replace a stressed out Măroiu. She lost her first relay 1–4 to Sun Yujie, but her 4–1 against Xu Anqi contributed to Romania's sudden-death victory. Popescu was crowned team world champion for the second time in a row. For this performance she, Măroiu and Alexandru, as members of the military club CSA Steaua, received the emblem of honour of the Romanian Army (Romanian: emblema de onoare a Armatei României) and all members of the team received honorary citizenship of Craiova.

In May 2012, the Romanian team received new kit from their equipment sponsor PBT, including red, yellow, and blue coloured masks which allow them to form as a team the tricolour flag of Romania. Because nobody else wanted it, Popescu opted for the yellow mask, which has since become her trademark. She was considered to carry the flag for Romania at the Olympics, but she declined, citing her left hand problem.

Number 1 in world rankings in April 2012, she went for gold in the London 2012 Summer Olympics, but she was beaten 14–13 in the round of 16 by Ukraine's Yana Shemyakina, who eventually took the gold medal. The top-seed Romanian team she led was defeated 45–38 by 10th-ranked South Korea in the quarter-finals and fell short of the podium too. Popescu was quoted saying: "This is the most painful moment in my life." After the Games three Romanian team members retired from sport, but Brânză decided to continue her career and announced her new goal was the 2016 Summer Olympics in Rio de Janeiro. After the resignation of her lifelong coach Dan Podeanu, she began training under Octavian Zidaru.

=== After the London Games ===
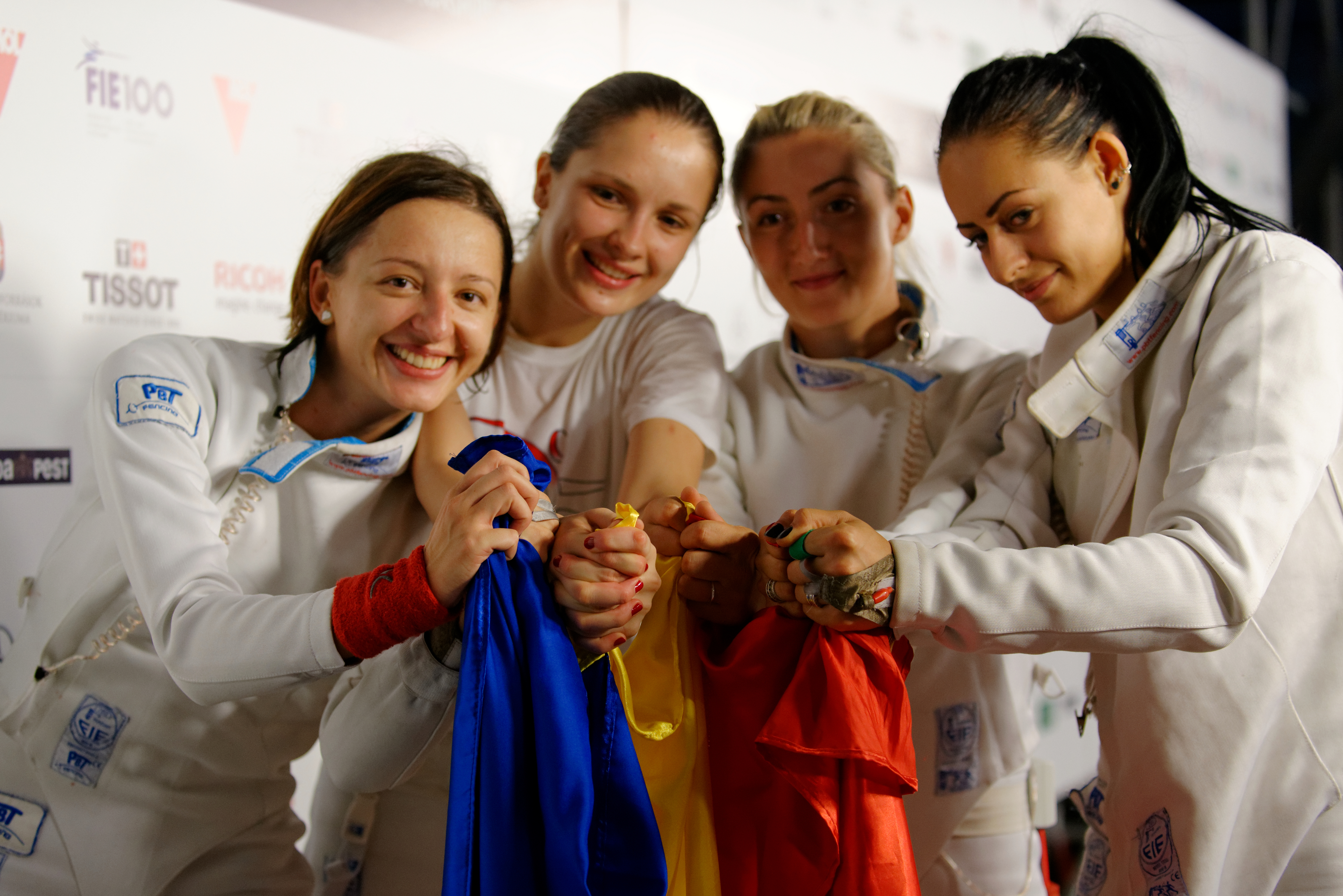
Popescu (left) and teammates celebrate Romania's bronze medal in the 2013 World Fencing Championships

In the 2012–13 season, Popescu made the podium in six out of eight entries in World Cup events, including gold medals in the Challenge International de Saint-Maur and the Havana Grand Prix. She led CSA Steaua to a silver medal in the European Champion Clubs' Cup in Naples. In May, she won her 8th national title as well as the team event.

Number one in the FIE world rankings, she went to the 2013 European Fencing Championships as favourite. She had a tight 15–14 win in the table of 32 against 17-year-old Alona Komarov of Israel. Her later bouts were easier victories and she eventually earned the gold after defeating Italia's Francesca Quondamcarlo 15–11 in the final. In the team event, she led a largely renewed Romanian side, now nicknamed "Poky Power", scoring the decisive hit in the 44–43 quarter-final against Sweden; Romania then disposed of Hungary, but failed against Estonia in the final and came away with a silver medal.

During the 2013 World Fencing Championships in Budapest, Popescu made her way comfortably to the table of eight, but she was defeated in a tight 14–15 bout by Estonia's Julia Beljajeva, who eventually won the competition. In the team event, Romania defeated successively Denmark, Venezuela, and South Korea, reaping revenge on the defeat in the Olympic Games. They were stopped in the semifinals by Russia, which largely prevailed with a 44–33 victory. Romania then fought France in the match for the third place; Brânză entered the last leg on a 25–25 draw and beat Joséphine Jacques-André-Coquin 8–3 to secure the bronze medal. Popescu was also elected a member of the athletes' commission in the elections held during the world championships. She finished the year No.1 for a record-equalling third time and received a gold medal from the FIE during its centenary gala dinner in Paris at the Automobile Club de France on 30 November 2013.

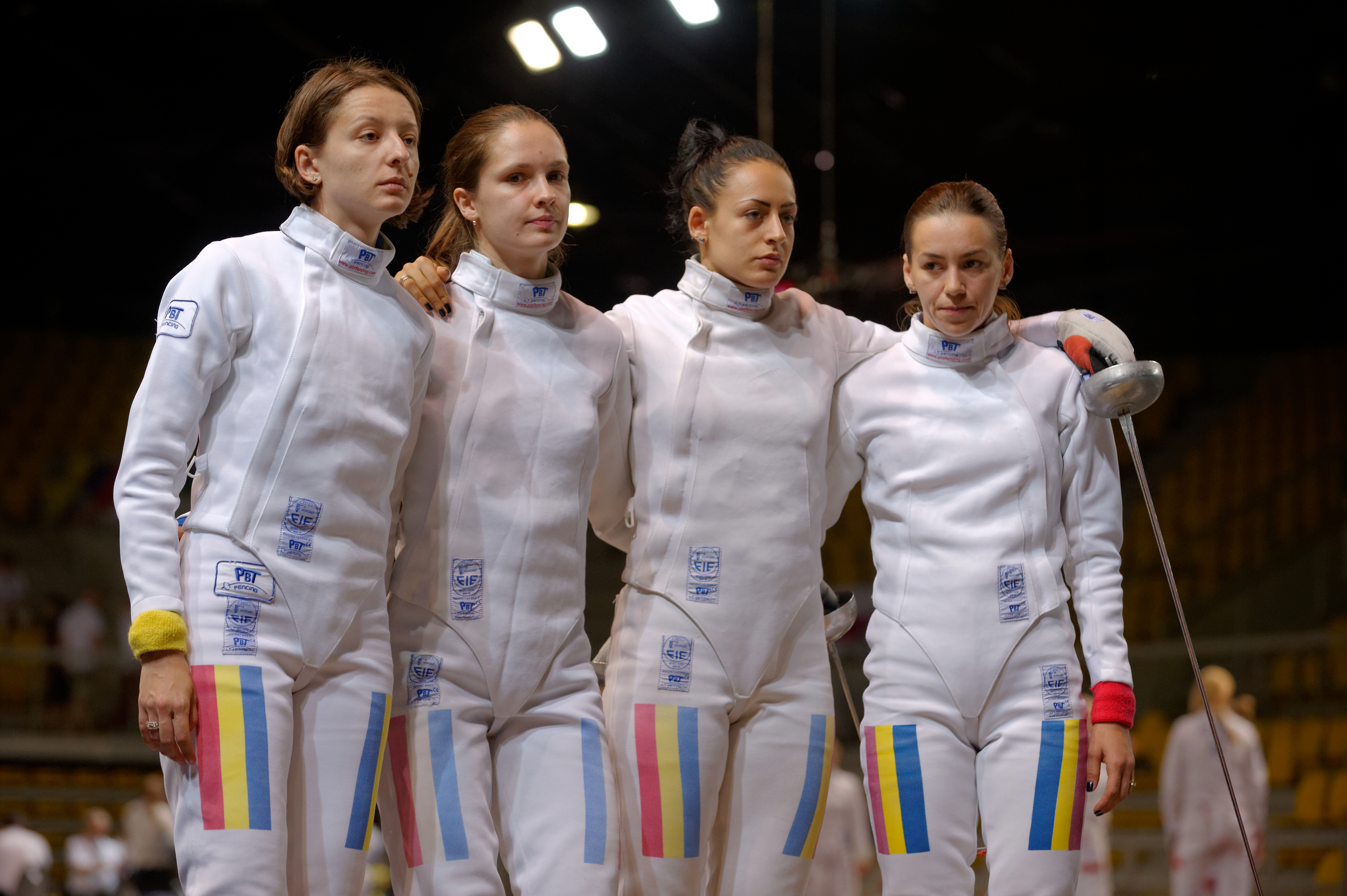
Brânză (left) and teammates at the semi-finals of the 2014 European Fencing Championships

In the 2013–14 season, Popescu took part in the World Combat Games in Saint-Petersburg, but failed to earn a medal after defeats against Emese Szász and Xu Anqi. She finished fifth in the first World Cup event of the season in Doha after Julianna Révész defeated her 7–8 in quarter-finals, but won the gold medal in the team event, scoring the decisive hit in additional time in the last three matches. She went on to win the Budapest Grand Prix, prevailing 15–7 against Irina Embrich in the final. She later earned a bronze medal in Saint-Maur after being stopped in semifinals by China's Xu Anqi, who eventually won the competition. After three podiums in Barcelona in 2011, 2012, and 2013, she exited the competition in the table of 8 after a 15–11 defeat against Qin Xue of China. In the team event, she led her team to the semi-finals, where Romania were defeated 35–20 by Russia. Romania then met the United States; Brânză scored the winning hit in additional time to earn bronze. The rest of the season brought her no podium placings and she lost in May her world No.1 ranking to Emese Szász.

At the European Championships in Strasbourg, Popescu could not defend her title as she was beaten 8–9 in the table of 32 by teammate Simona Gherman, who eventually won a bronze medal. In the team competition, No.2 seed Romania received a bye, then disposed of Ukraine 45–31, beat Italy 29–24 in the semi-final and overcame Russia 38–34 in a very tight and tactical final, allowing Popescu to win her fifth team European gold. The World Championships in Kazan proved very disappointing as Popescu was stopped in the table of 16 by Estonia's Irina Embrich and slid to the fifth place in FIE rankings. In the team event, Romania prevailed over Germany, but were defeated in the table of 8 by Italy. Popescu entered on 25–24 for Italy in the last leg and was overcome 16–8 by newly crowned World champion Rossella Fiamingo. Romania entered the placement rounds and first defeated China, then the United States to take the fifth place in the competition. Following this failure, Octavian Zidaru was replaced as coach by Dan Podeanu, whom Brânză regards as a second father and who was persuaded to come back for a second stint.

Popescu entered the 2014–15 season with a silver medal at the Legnano World Cup after a 13–12 defeat in additional time against Ukraine's Anfisa Pochkalova. In the team event, she scored the winning hit in extra time in the semi-finals against Italy, but Romania were overcome by Estonia in the final and doomed to silver. She posted another second place in Xuzhou after failing in the final against Emese Szász. At the Doha Grand Prix, her way to the podium was again blocked by Gherman, who defeated her 4–3 in the quarter-finals.

The Barcelona World Cup in January 2015 proved disappointing as Brânză lost in the second round to Poland's Renata Knapik-Miazga, ranked 57th in the world. She subsequently slid to the 8th place in FIE rankings. In the team event, Romania saw off Israel, then China in the quarter-finals. However, Brânză injured her weapon hand after Sun Yujie accidentally collided with her. She fenced only part of the semifinal with Sweden, which overcame Romania 45–33. She did not fence at all in the small final, where a last-bout rally by Gherman allowed Romania to take the bronze medal. After being rested for ten days, she reached the quarter-finals in the Buenos Aires World Cup, but lost to Korea's Shin A-lam. In the team event, Romania prevailed over Venezuela and Estonia, then crushed Russia 45–24 before yielding 30–26 to Italy. Their silver medal allowed them to climb to the third place in the World rankings. In March, Popescu earned the silver medal at the Budapest after losing again to Shin in the final. She subsequently reached the third place in FIE rankings. In May, she was defeated by Anca Măroiu in the Romanian national championship and came away with a bronze medal. She was rested for the Rio de Janeiro Grand Prix, but Shin A-lam's average result at the competition allowed Popescu to reach the second place in world rankings.

At the 2015 European Championships in Montreux, Popescu switched her yellow mask for a tricolour one bearing Romanian colours. In the individual event, she stopped short of the podium after a defeat in the quarter-finals to world No.1 Emese Szász. In the team event, Romania saw off Ukraine, then met Sweden, coached by Romanian Adrian Pop. Popescu entered the last relay on a draw and defeating Sweden's captain Emma Samuelsson to bring her team in the final. As in the 2013 edition they met Estonia, which they defeated this time on 45–30. Brânză claimed her sixth continental title, a record in women's épée. A few weeks later, she reached the final at the 2015 European Games in Baku after a sudden-death victory over Estonia's Erika Kirpu. She proceeded to defeat Russia's Yana Zvereva, winning Romania's first gold medal at the Games. In the team event, Romania reached the final, where they met the same Estonian team as at the European Championships and produced a repeat performance to allow Brânză a double gold haul.

At the 2015 World Championships in Moscow, Popescu was eliminated in the second round by Estonia's Katrina Lehis, whom she had always defeated before. In the team event Romania defeated successively Turkey, Switzerland, Hungary and Ukraine to meet China in the final. Popescu opened the match against Xu Anqi, but failed to find an edge and was defeated 2–5. The following bouts proved as difficult and Popescu entered the last relay on 28–36. She could not bridge the gap and Romania lost eventually on 36–45, taking the silver medal. Popescu finished the season World No.4.

== Medal record ==
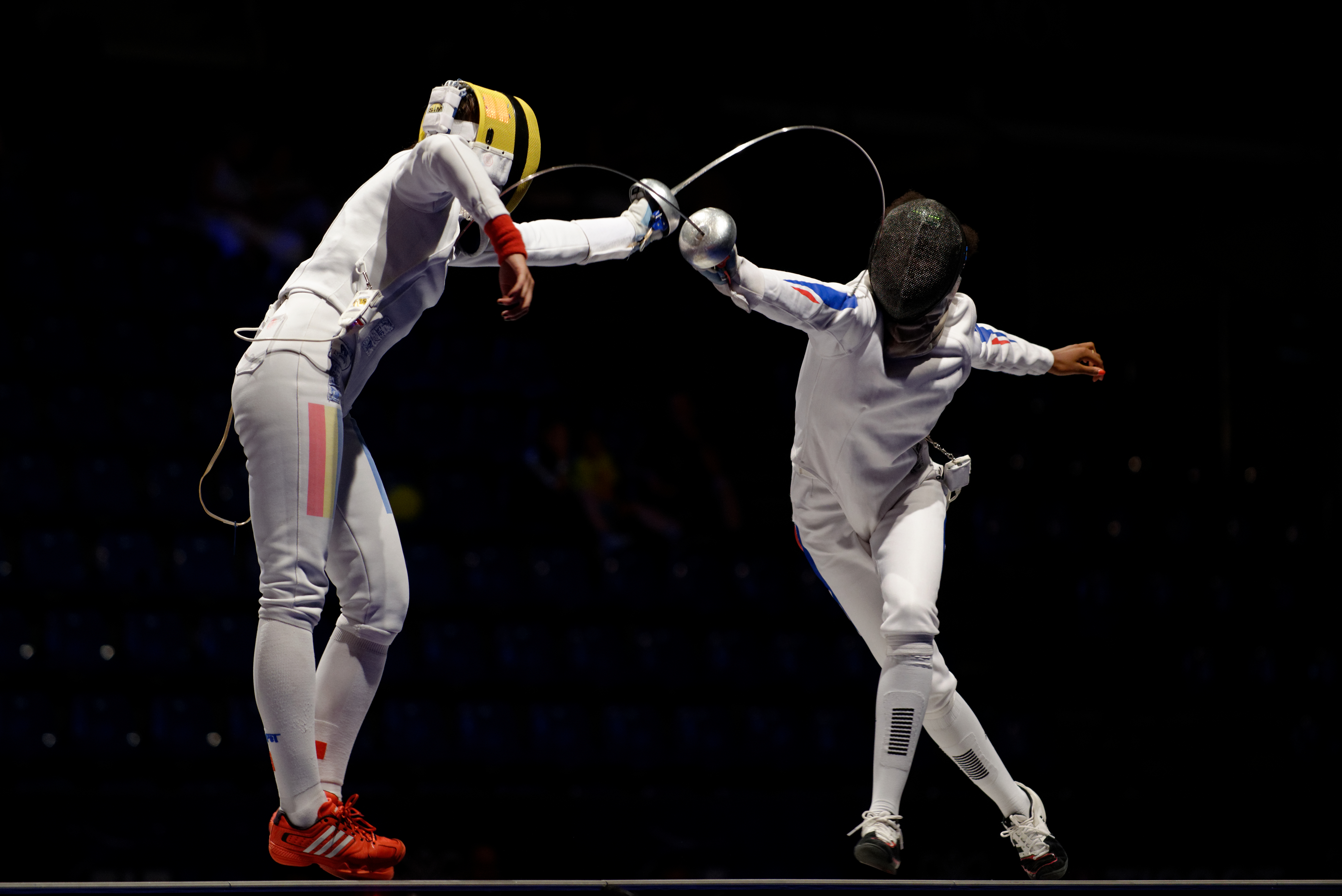
Brânză (yellow mask) during the match for the 3rd place against France in the 2013 World Fencing Championships

=== Olympic Games ===
Year	Location	Event	Position
2008	Beijing, China	Individual Women's Épée	2nd
2016	Rio de Janeiro, Brazil	Team Women's Épée	1st
2020	Tokyo, Japan	Individual Women's Épée	2nd

=== World Championship ===
Year	Location	Event	Position
2010	Paris, France	Team Women's Épée	1st
2011	Catania, Italy	Individual Women's Épée	3rd
2011	Catania, Italy	Team Women's Épée	1st
2013	Budapest, Hungary	Team Women's Épée	3rd
2015	Moscow, Russia	Team Women's Épée	2nd
2018	Wuxi, China	Individual Women's Épée	2nd

=== European Championship ===
Year	Location	Event	Position
2008	Kyiv, Ukraine	Individual Women's Épée	2nd
2008	Kyiv, Ukraine	Team Women's Épée	3rd
2009	Plovdiv, Bulgaria	Team Women's Épée	1st
2011	Sheffield, United Kingdom	Individual Women's Épée	3rd
2011	Sheffield, United Kingdom	Team Women's Épée	1st
2012	Legnano, Italy	Team Women's Épée	2nd
2013	Zagreb, Croatia	Individual Women's Épée	1st
2013	Zagreb, Croatia	Team Women's Épée	2nd
2014	Strasbourg, France	Team Women's Épée	1st
2015	Montreux, Switzerland	Team Women's Épée	1st
2016	Toruń, Poland	Individual Women's Épée	2nd
2016	Toruń, Poland	Team Women's Épée	3rd

=== Grand Prix ===
Date	Location	Event	Position
21 January 2005	Budapest, Hungary	Individual Women's Épée	2nd
16 February 2007	Barcelona, Spain	Individual Women's Épée	3rd
18 January 2008	Budapest, Hungary	Individual Women's Épée	2nd
24 January 2009	Doha, Qatar	Individual Women's Épée	1st
2 June 2009	Rome, Italy	Individual Women's Épée	2nd
20 February 2009	Saint-Maur-des-Fossés, France	Individual Women's Épée	3rd
15 May 2009	Nanjing, China	Individual Women's Épée	1st
14 May 2010	Nanjing, China	Individual Women's Épée	1st
2 February 2013	Budapest, Hungary	Individual Women's Épée	3rd
27 April 2013	Xuzhou, China	Individual Women's Épée	2nd
23 May 2013	Havana, Cuba	Individual Women's Épée	1st
2 January 2014	Budapest, Hungary	Individual Women's Épée	1st
20 March 2015	Budapest, Hungary	Individual Women's Épée	2nd
12 August 2017	Doha, Qatar	Individual Women's Épée	1st
3 August 2019	Budapest, Hungary	Individual Women's Épée	1st
5 March 2019	Cali, Colombia	Individual Women's Épée	3rd
24 January 2020	Doha, Qatar	Individual Women's Épée	1st

=== World Cup ===
Date	Location	Event	Position
20 January 2006	Budapest, Hungary	Individual Women's Épée	1st
27 January 2007	Prague, Czech Republic	Individual Women's Épée	2nd
17 March 2007	Florina, Greece	Individual Women's Épée	1st
8 June 2007	Havana, Cuba	Individual Women's Épée	3rd
2 February 2008	Luxembourg	Individual Women's Épée	3rd
16 February 2008	Barcelona, Spain	Individual Women's Épée	3rd
8 March 2008	St. Petersburg, Russia	Individual Women's Épée	1st
6 June 2008	Havana, Cuba	Individual Women's Épée	2nd
14 March 2009	Florina, Greece	Individual Women's Épée	3rd
6 June 2009	Havana, Cuba	Individual Women's Épée	1st
13 March 2010	Florina, Greece	Individual Women's Épée	1st
9 June 2010	Havana, Cuba	Individual Women's Épée	3rd
11 March 2011	Barcelona, Spain	Individual Women's Épée	1st
9 March 2012	Barcelona, Spain	Individual Women's Épée	1st
19 January 2013	Doha, Qatar	Individual Women's Épée	2nd
1 March 2013	Katowice, Poland	Individual Women's Épée	1st
8 March 2013	Barcelona, Spain	Individual Women's Épée	3rd
28 February 2014	Katowice, Poland	Individual Women's Épée	3rd
24 October 2014	Legnano, Italy	Individual Women's Épée	2nd
14 November 2014	Xuzhou, China	Individual Women's Épée	2nd
13 November 2015	Nanjing, China	Individual Women's Épée	1st
22 January 2016	Barcelona, Spain	Individual Women's Épée	3rd
1 November 2019	Tallinn, Estonia	Individual Women's Épée	1st
1 October 2020	Havana, Cuba	Individual Women's Épée	2nd

=== Military sport ===
==== Military World Games/Military World Fencing Championships ====
- Team gold, 2011 Rio de Janeiro
- Team gold, 2010 Caracas
- Individual gold, 2006 Bucharest
- Team gold, 2005 Bucharest
- Individual gold, 2005 Grosseto
- Individual bronze, 2010 Caracas
- Team bronze, 2005 Grosseto

==== Military European Fencing Championships ====
- Individual gold, 2009 Gothenburg
- Team gold, 2009 Gothenburg

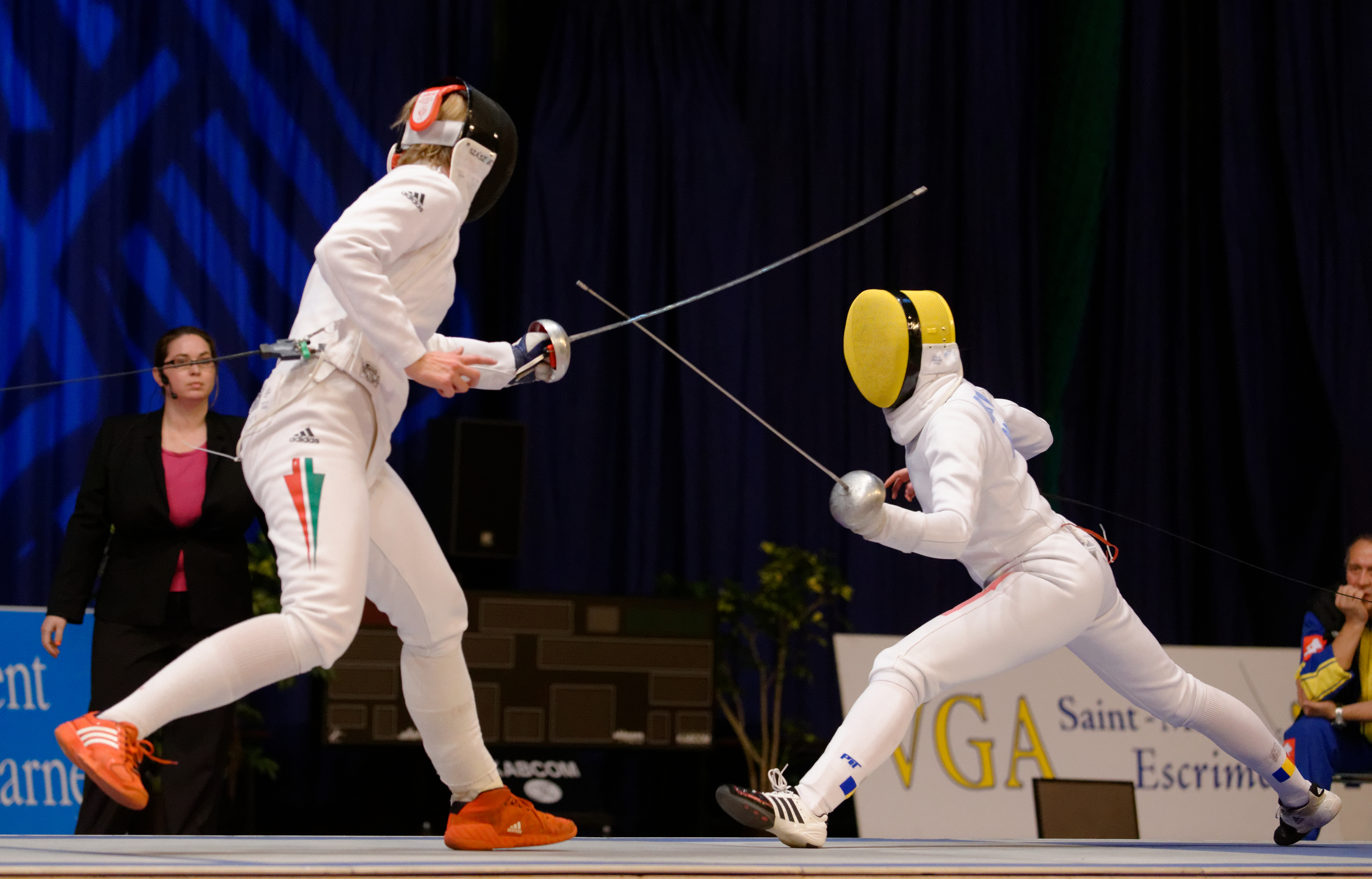
Brânză (yellow mask) v Emese Szász during the final of the Challenge International de Saint-Maur 2013

=== Cadet and junior ===
==== Junior World Fencing Championships ====
- Individual gold, 2004 Plovdiv
- Individual gold, 2002 Antalya
- Team silver, 2001 Gdańsk (with Loredana Iordăchioiu and Iuliana Măceșeanu)
- Team bronze, 2004 Plovdiv (with Loredana Iordăchioiu and Simona Alexandru)

==== Junior European Fencing Championships ====
- Individual gold, 2003 Poreč
- Team gold, 2003 Poreč

==== Cadet World Fencing Championships ====
- Individual gold, 2001 Gdańsk

== Awards and honours ==
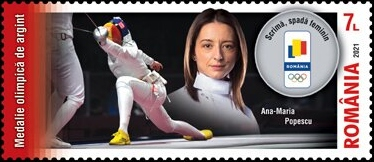
Popescu on a 2021 stamp of Romania

- Order for sports merit (Ordinul "Meritul Sportiv"), second class
- Honorary citizen (cetățean de onoare) of Craiova and Bușteni
- Aspen "Sports and Society Leadership" Award, 2013
