= 2010 World Fencing Championships =

International fencing competition

2010 World Championships in Fencing
- Dates: 4 November – 13 November
- Host city: Paris, France
- Venue: Grand Palais
- Nations participating: 110
- Athletes participating: 950
- Events: 12

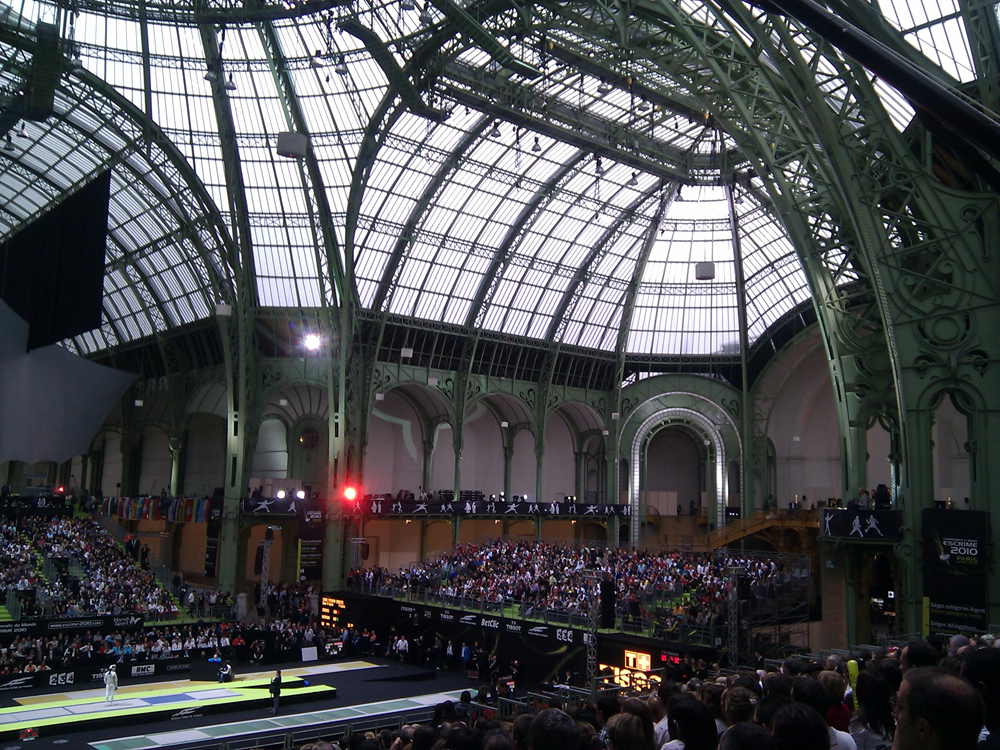
General view of the Grand Palais during the championship

The 2010 World Fencing Championships were held at the Grand Palais in Paris, France 4–13 November.

== Medal table ==
* Host nation (France)

Rank	Nation	Gold	Silver	Bronze	Total
1	Italy (ITA)	2	3	2	7
2	France (FRA)*	2	1	2	5
3	Russia (RUS)	2	0	3	5
4	Germany (GER)	1	2	0	3
5	United States (USA)	1	1	1	3
6	China (CHN)	1	1	0	2
7	South Korea (KOR)	1	0	3	4
8	Romania (ROU)	1	0	2	3
9	Estonia (EST)	1	0	0	1
10	Ukraine (UKR)	0	2	1	3
11	Hungary (HUN)	0	1	2	3
12	Poland (POL)	0	1	0	1
13	Japan (JPN)	0	0	2	2
Totals (13 entries)		12	12	18	42

== Men's events ==
Event	Gold	Silver	Bronze
Individual Épée	Nikolai Novosjolov (EST)	Gauthier Grumier (FRA)	Gábor Boczkó (HUN); Jean-Michel Lucenay (FRA)
Team Épée	France (FRA); Gauthier Grumier; Jérôme Jeannet; Jean-Michel Lucenay; Ulrich Robeiri	United States (USA); Benjamin Bratton; Weston Kelsey; Cody Mattern; Benjamin Ungar	Hungary (HUN); Gábor Boczkó; Géza Imre; András Rédli; Péter Somfai
Individual Foil	Peter Joppich (GER)	Lei Sheng (CHN)	Gerek Meinhardt (USA); Yuki Ota (JPN)
Team foil	China (CHN); Huang Liangcai; Lei Sheng; Zhang Liangliang; Zhu Jun	Italy (ITA); Valerio Aspromonte; Andrea Baldini; Stefano Barrera; Andrea Cassarà	Japan (JPN); Suguru Awaji; Kenta Chida; Ryo Miyake; Yuki Ota
Individual Sabre	Won Woo-young (KOR)	Nicolas Limbach (GER)	Cosmin Hănceanu (ROU); Veniamin Reshetnikov (RUS)
Team sabre	Russia (RUS); Nikolay Kovalev; Veniamin Reshetnikov; Aleksey Yakimenko; Artem Zanin	Italy (ITA); Aldo Montano; Diego Occhiuzzi; Luigi Samele; Luigi Tarantino	Romania (ROU); Tiberiu Dolniceanu; Rareș Dumitrescu; Cosmin Hănceanu; Florin Zalomir

== Women's events ==
Event	Gold	Silver	Bronze
Individual Épée	Maureen Nisima (FRA)	Emese Szász (HUN)	Tatiana Logunova (RUS); Nathalie Moellhausen (ITA)
Team Épée	Romania (ROU); Simona Alexandru; Ana Maria Brânză; Loredana Iordăchioiu; Anca Măroiu	Germany (GER); Imke Duplitzer; Britta Heidemann; Ricarda Multerer; Monika Sozanska	South Korea (KOR); Jung Hyo-jung; Oh Yun-hee; Park Se-ra; Shin A-lam
Individual Foil	Elisa Di Francisca (ITA)	Arianna Errigo (ITA)	Nam Hyun-hee (KOR); Valentina Vezzali (ITA)
Team foil	Italy (ITA); Elisa Di Francisca; Arianna Errigo; Ilaria Salvatori; Valentina Vezzali	Poland (POL); Karolina Chlewińska; Sylwia Gruchała; Katarzyna Kryczalo; Anna Rybicka	South Korea (KOR); Jeon Hee-sook; Nam Hyun-see; Oh Ha-na; Seo Mi-jung
Individual Sabre	Mariel Zagunis (USA)	Olha Kharlan (UKR)	Olena Khomrova (UKR); Sofiya Velikaya (RUS)
Team sabre	Russia (RUS); Dina Galiakbarova; Yuliya Gavrilova; Svetlana Kormilitsyna; Sofiya Velikaya	Ukraine (UKR); Olha Kharlan; Olena Khomrova; Halyna Pundyk; Olga Zhovnir	France (FRA); Cécilia Berder; Solenne Mary; Léonore Perrus; Carole Vergne

== Participating nations ==
A record of 110 nations competed, with many making their debuts including Curaçao and Sri Lanka among others.

- Algeria (1)
- Argentina (13)
- Armenia (3)
- Aruba (1)
- Australia (17)
- Austria (10)
- Azerbaijan (2)
- Bangladesh (1)
- Belarus (11)
- Belgium (5)
- Bolivia (1)
- Brazil (22)
- Brunei (1)
- Bulgaria (6)
- Burkina Faso (1)
- Cameroon (2)
- Canada (23)
- Chile (8)
- China (31)
- Colombia (10)
- Costa Rica (2)
- Côte d'Ivoire (4)
- Croatia (5)
- Cuba (1)
- Curaçao (1)
- Cyprus (1)
- Czech Republic (14)
- Denmark (2)
- Democratic Republic of the Congo (1)
- Dominican Republic (9)
- Ecuador (1)
- El Salvador (3)
- Egypt (8)
- Estonia (8)
- Finland (8)
- France (39)
- Georgia (1)
- Germany (25)
- Greece (17)
- Guatemala (1)
- Guinea (1)
- Honduras (1)
- Hong Kong (23)
- Hungary (34)
- Iceland (3)
- India (9)
- Indonesia (1)
- Iran (8)
- Iraq (13)
- Ireland (2)
- Israel (18)
- Italy (32)
- Japan (25)
- Jordan (1)
- Kazakhstan (31)
- Kyrgyzstan (5)
- Latvia (7)
- Lebanon (6)
- Libya (1)
- Lithuania (6)
- Luxembourg (2)
- Macedonia (1)
- Malaysia (1)
- Mali (4)
- Mexico (7)
- Morocco (3)
- Moldova (3)
- Monaco (2)
- Mongolia (1)
- Namibia (1)
- Netherlands (9)
- New Zealand (1)
- Nicaragua (1)
- Niger (2)
- Nigeria (1)
- Norway (7)
- Panama (3)
- Paraguay (1)
- Peru (2)
- Poland (42)
- Portugal (8)
- Qatar (7)
- Romania (22)
- Russia (41)
- Senegal (5)
- Serbia (6)
- Sierra Leone (7)
- Singapore (7)
- Slovakia (2)
- Slovenia (2)
- South Africa (14)
- South Korea (25)
- Spain (16)
- Sri Lanka (1)
- Sweden (6)
- Switzerland (8)
- Chinese Taipei (5)
- Tajikistan (1)
- Thailand (15)
- Togo (1)
- Tunisia (10)
- Turkey (13)
- Ukraine (33)
- United Kingdom (27)
- United States (32)
- United States Virgin Islands (1)
- Uruguay (2)
- Uzbekistan (3)
- Venezuela (24)
- Vietnam (1)
