= Bianca Del Carretto =

Italian fencer

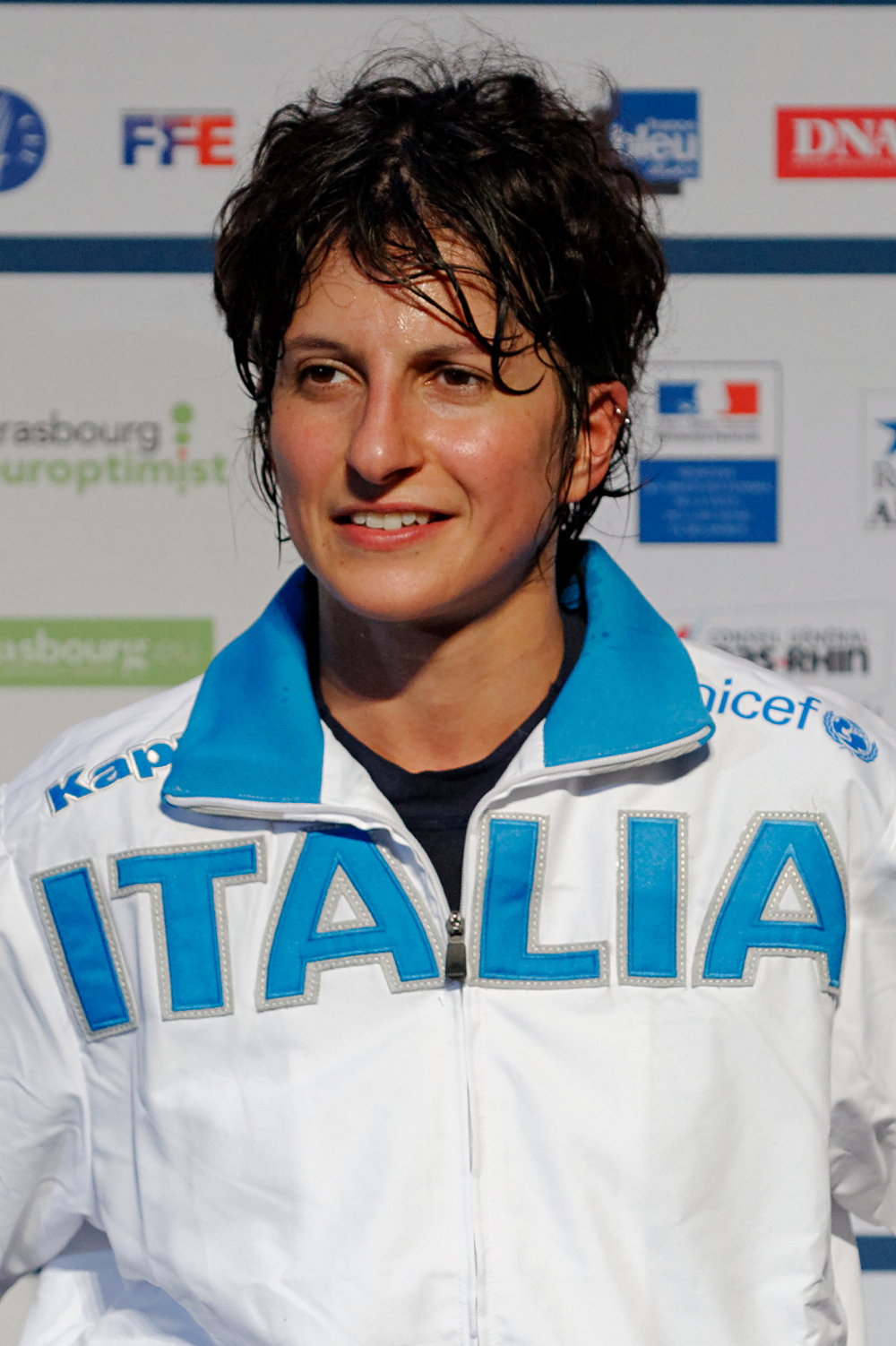

Personal information
- Born: 28 August 1985 (age 40) Rapallo, Italy
- Height: 1.74 m (5 ft 8 1/2 in)
- Weight: 60 kg (132 lb; 9 st 6 lb)

Fencing career
- Sport: Fencing
- Country: Italy
- Weapon: Épée
- Hand: right-handed
- Club: C.S. Aeronautica Militare
- Head coach: Andrea Candiani
- Former coach: Roberto Cirillo
- FIE ranking: current ranking
Medal record
Women's Fencing
Representing Italy
World Championships
Gold medal – first place	2009 Antalya	Team épée
Bronze medal – third place	2011 Catania	Team épée
Bronze medal – third place	2014 Kazan	Team épée
European Championships
Gold medal – first place	2007 Ghent	Team épée
Gold medal – first place	2014 Strasbourg	Individual
Silver medal – second place	2010 Leipzig	Team épée
Bronze medal – third place	2003 Bourges	Team épée
Bronze medal – third place	2008 Kyiv	Individual
Bronze medal – third place	2008 Kyiv	Team épée
Bronze medal – third place	2014 Strasbourg	Team épée

Bianca Del Carretto (born 28 August 1985) is an Italian épée fencer. She was European champion in 2014 and team World champion in 2009.

== Career ==
Del Carretto learnt fencing at Club Scherma Rapallo under Roberto Cirillo. Her first international significant result was a team gold in the 2002 Junior European Championships in Conegliano. In 2003, she took a bronze medal in the individual event and a silver medal in the team event at the Junior European Championships in Poreč. The same year, she earned a team bronze medal in the Senior European Championships in Bourges. In 2004, she came away with a silver medal in the Junior World Championships in Plovdiv after being defeated in the final by Romania's Ana Maria Brânză.

In her senior career, she proved a reliable team member and contributed to Italy's several podium placings. In 2009, along with Cristiana Cascioli, Nathalie Moellhausen, and Francesca Quondamcarlo, she earned an historical gold medal for Italy in the World Championships in Antalya. The following season, she climbed her first podium in the Fencing World Cup with a third place in the Doha Grand Prix, followed by another bronze at Luxembourg.

In the 2010–11 season, Del Carretto won the Havana Grand Prix and earned a bronze medal in Nanjing. These placings allowed her to finish the year No.3 in world rankings, a career best as of 2014, despite her 2nd-round elimination at the World Championships in Catania by the hands of Ana Maria Brânză, who eventually won the bronze medal. In the team event, Italy were stopped in the semi-final by China, but defeated Germany to earn a bronze medal.

Del Carretto competed at the 2012 Summer Olympics in the Women's épée, but was defeated in the second round by reigning Olympic champion Britta Heidemann. Poor performances in the World Cup, her best placing being a quarter-final in Havana, caused a drop to No.27 in world rankings. 2012–13 was also a meagre year despite a bronze medal in the Xuzhou Grand Prix. Del Carretto then transferred to C.S. Aeronautica Militare, with Andrea Candiani as new coach, and moved from Legnano to Milan.

During the 2013–14 season, Del Carretto dislocated her weapon shoulder during a training camp and stayed incapacitated for a month. She arrived with a No.44 ranking to the European Championships. She was seeded fourth out of pools and received a bye in the table of 32. She then defeated Poland's Magdalena Piekarska, teammate Francesca Quondamcarlo, and World No.1 Emese Szász to reach the semi-finals. She disposed 15–13 of host France's Joséphine Jacques-André-Coquin in the semi-final, then beat 15–12 another Frenchwoman, Marie-Florence Candassamy, to come away with Italy's first European individual gold medal since Elisa Uga at Plovdiv in 1998. In the team event, Del Carretto's Italy were overcome 24–29 in the semi-final by Romania, who eventually won the gold medal. Italy met 2013 European champions Estonia in the match for the third place and won 45–42.
