= Simona Gherman =

Romanian épée fencer

Simona Cristina Gherman
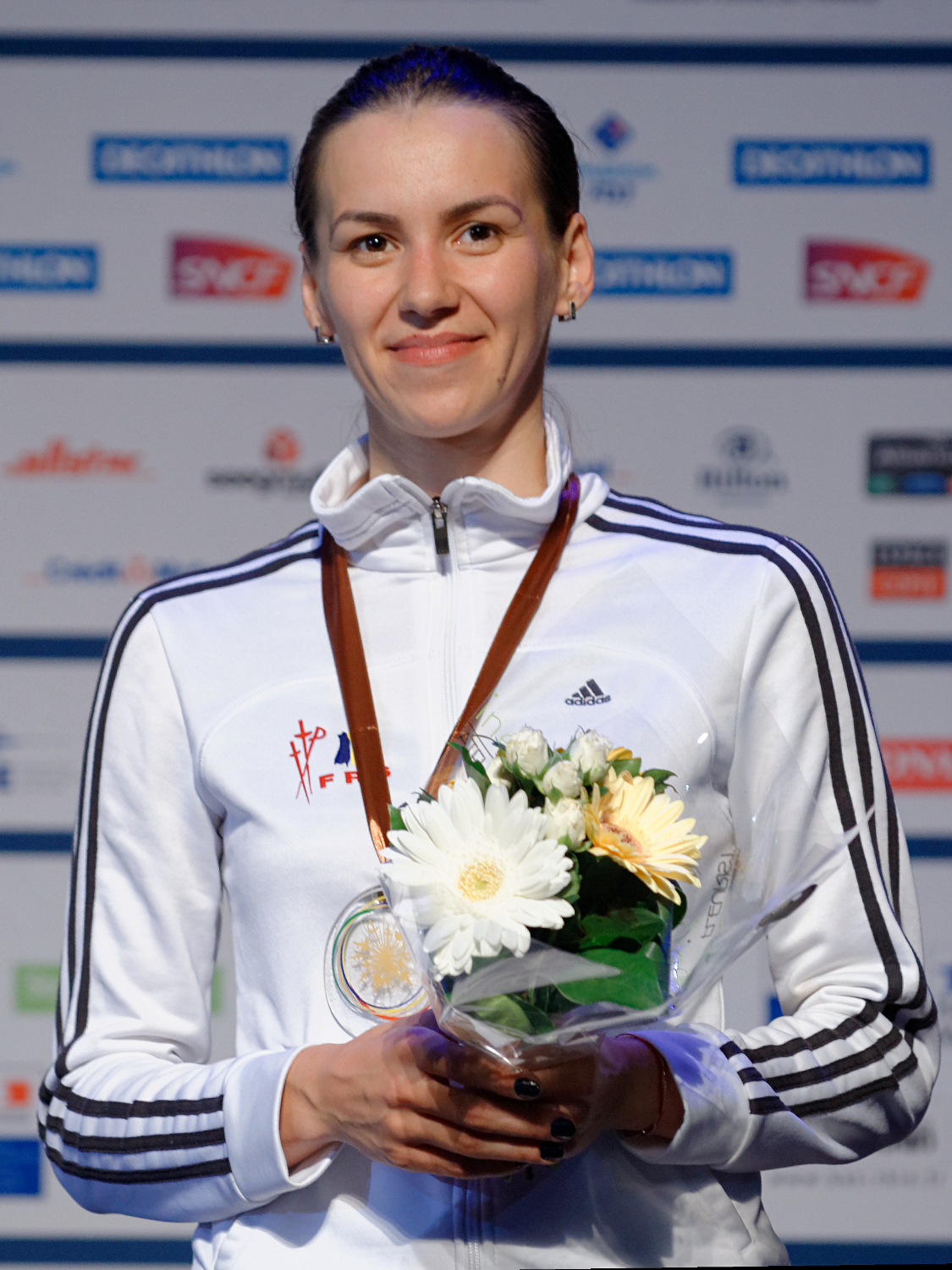
- Gherman at the 2014 European Fencing Championships

Personal information
- Nationality: Romanian
- Born: Simona Cristina Alexandru; 12 April 1985 (age 41) Bucharest, Romania
- Height: 1.70 m (5 ft 7 in)
- Weight: 55 kg (121 lb; 8.7 st)

Fencing career
- Sport: Fencing
- Weapon: Épée
- Hand: Right-handed
- National coach: Dan Podeanu, Gheorghe Epurescu
- Club: Steaua București
- Head coach: Cornel Milan
- FIE ranking: current ranking
Medal record
Olympic Games
| Gold medal – first place | 2016 Rio de Janeiro | Team |
World Championships
| Gold medal – first place | 2010 Paris | Team |
| Gold medal – first place | 2011 Catania | Team |
| Silver medal – second place | 2015 Moscow | Team |
European Games
| Gold medal – first place | 2015 Baku | Team |
| Bronze medal – third place | 2015 Baku | Individual |
European Championships
| Gold medal – first place | 2008 Kyiv | Team |
| Gold medal – first place | 2009 Plovdiv | Team |
| Gold medal – first place | 2011 Sheffield | Team |
| Gold medal – first place | 2012 Legnano | Individual |
| Gold medal – first place | 2014 Strasbourg | Team |
| Gold medal – first place | 2015 Montreux | Team |
| Gold medal – first place | 2016 Toruń | Individual |
| Silver medal – second place | 2012 Legnano | Team |
| Bronze medal – third place | 2014 Strasbourg | Individual |
| Bronze medal – third place | 2016 Toruń | Team |

Simona Gherman (née Alexandru; born 12 April 1985) is a retired Romanian épée fencer, European champion in 2012 and 2016. She was twice team World Champion in 2010 and 2011 and five-time team European Champion in 2008, 2009, 2011, 2014, and 2015.

== Career ==
Gherman was born in Bucharest in 1985. Her first significant result was a team bronze medal with Loredana Iordăchioiu and Ana Maria Popescu at the 2004 Junior World Championships in Plovdiv. The same year, she won a Junior World Cup tournament in Palermo.

Gherman then joined the senior national team captained by Popescu. Along with Iordăchioiu and Anca Măroiu, they won the European Championships in 2008 and 2009. In the 2010 World Fencing Championships, the "Power Praf girls"—a nickname the Romanian team had given themselves after the Powerpuff Girls anime— took the first Romanian team gold in épée after defeating Germany at the Grand Palais in Paris.

In 2011, Gherman won a team gold at the European Fencing Championships in Sheffield and at the World Military Championships in Rio de Janeiro. In August, she married Dragoș Gherman, whose name she took in competitions. In the World Championships Romania met China in the final. After Popescu was injured, Gherman fenced Li Na in the last leg and scored the decisive hit, allowing Romania to retain their gold medal. She contributed more than half her team's hits. Three World Cup podiums in Budapest, Havana, and Rio de Janeiro, allowed her to reach the 6th place in FIE rankings.

In 2012, Gherman won the gold in the European Championships after prevailing over teammate Măroiu. Along with a podium in the Barcelona World Cup tournament, this result pushed her to the 5th place in FIE rankings, a personal best as of 2014. In the London 2012 Olympics, she was defeated 15–14 in the quarter-finals by Ukraine's Yana Shemyakina, who eventually earned the gold medal. Top-seeded Romania was also defeated 45–38 in the women's team épée event by 10th-ranked South Korea in the quarter-finals and failed to earn a medal either. Gherman then decided to take a break from her career.

In December 2013, Gherman gave birth to a daughter named Ioana Teodora. She announced in April 2014 that she would return to fencing and be reintegrated into the national team. A few weeks later she won the Romanian national championship after defeating 15–12 in the final teammate and world No.1 Ana Maria Brânză. She failed to qualify to the main table of 64 in the Rio de Janeiro World Cup, the first international competition after her comeback, but won a bronze medal a few days later in the Havana Grand Prix.

At the European Championships in Strasbourg, she reached the semifinal, defeating reigning European champion Ana Brânză and reigning Olympic champion Yana Shemyakina along the way. She lost 9–15 to Marie-Florence Candassamy from hosts France to finish with a bronze medal. In the team competition, No.2 seed Romania received a bye, then disposed of Ukraine 45–31 and met Italy in the semifinals. Gherman both opened and closed for her team, scoring four hits in a row against Rossella Fiamingo in the last relay to win 29–24. In the final against No.1 seed Russia, Gherman entered the last leg on 26 all and defeated Lyubov Shutova 12–8 to bring Romania their 5th gold medal. At the World Championships in Kazan, Gherman prevailed easily over Magdalena Piekarska of Poland, but was stopped 14–15 in the second round by 2008 Olympic champion Britta Heidemann, who eventually earned the bronze medal. In the team event, Romania prevailed over Germany, but were defeated in the table of 8 by Italy and exited the tournament with no medal.

In the 2014–15 season, Gherman won her first World Cup title at the Doha Grand Prix, after defeating Estonia's Erika Kirpu in the final. In Barcelona, she was eliminated in the table of 16 by Russia's Tatyana Andryushina, but she was instrumental in Romania's bronze medal in the team event, first bridging the points gap, then striking the decisive hit in the “small final” against Russia.
