= Imke Duplitzer =

German épée fencer

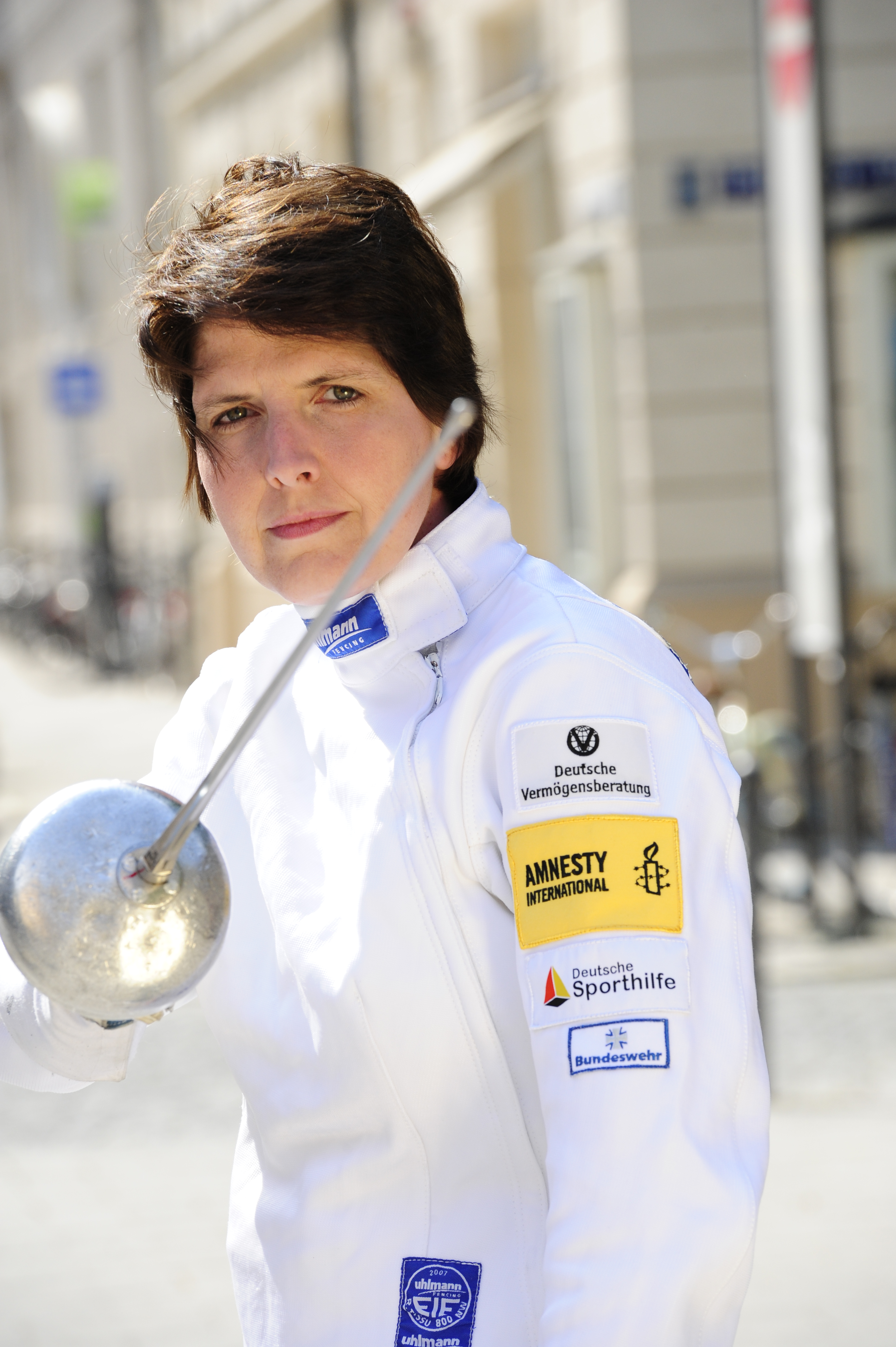
- Duplitzer in 2011

Personal information
- Born: 28 July 1975 (age 51) Karlsruhe, West Germany
- Height: 1.86 m (6 ft 1 in)
- Weight: 72 kg (159 lb)
- Website: imke-duplitzer.de

Fencing career
- Sport: Fencing
- Weapon: Épée
- Hand: right-handed
- FIE ranking: current ranking
Medal record
Women's épée fencing
Representing Germany
Olympic Games
Silver medal – second place	2004 Athens	Team épée
World Championships
Silver medal – second place	1993 Essen	Team épée
Silver medal – second place	1997 Cape Town	Team épée
Silver medal – second place	2002 Lisbon	Individual épée
Silver medal – second place	2003 Havana	Team épée
Silver medal – second place	2010 Paris	Team épée
Bronze medal – third place	1999 Seoul	Team épée
Bronze medal – third place	2005 Leipzig	Team épée
Bronze medal – third place	2006 Torino	Team épée
Bronze medal – third place	2007 St Petersburg	Team épée
Bronze medal – third place	2008 Beijing	Team épée
Bronze medal – third place	2009 Antalya	Team épée
European Championship
Gold medal – first place	1998 Plovdiv	Team épée
Gold medal – first place	1999 Bolzano	Individual épée
Gold medal – first place	2010 Leipzig	Individual épée
Bronze medal – third place	2006 İzmir	Team épée

Imke Duplitzer (born 28 July 1975 in Karlsruhe) is a German épée fencer. Imke is a four time Olympian (2000, 2004, 2008, and 2012) where she placed 10th, 5th, 5th, and 29th respectively (in the individual competition). She also fenced in three team events at the Olympics, and at the 2004 Summer Olympics she won the silver medal in the team épée competition with Britta Heidemann and Claudia Bokel. During the 2006 World Fencing Championships, she won the bronze medal after beating Romania in the épée team event together with her teammates Claudia Bokel, Britta Heidemann and Marijana Markovic. She is also a two-time European Champion in the individual event (1999 & 2010) as well as being a part of the gold medal-winning team in 1998.

Duplitzer is openly lesbian.
