= Jung Hyo-jung =

South Korean fencer

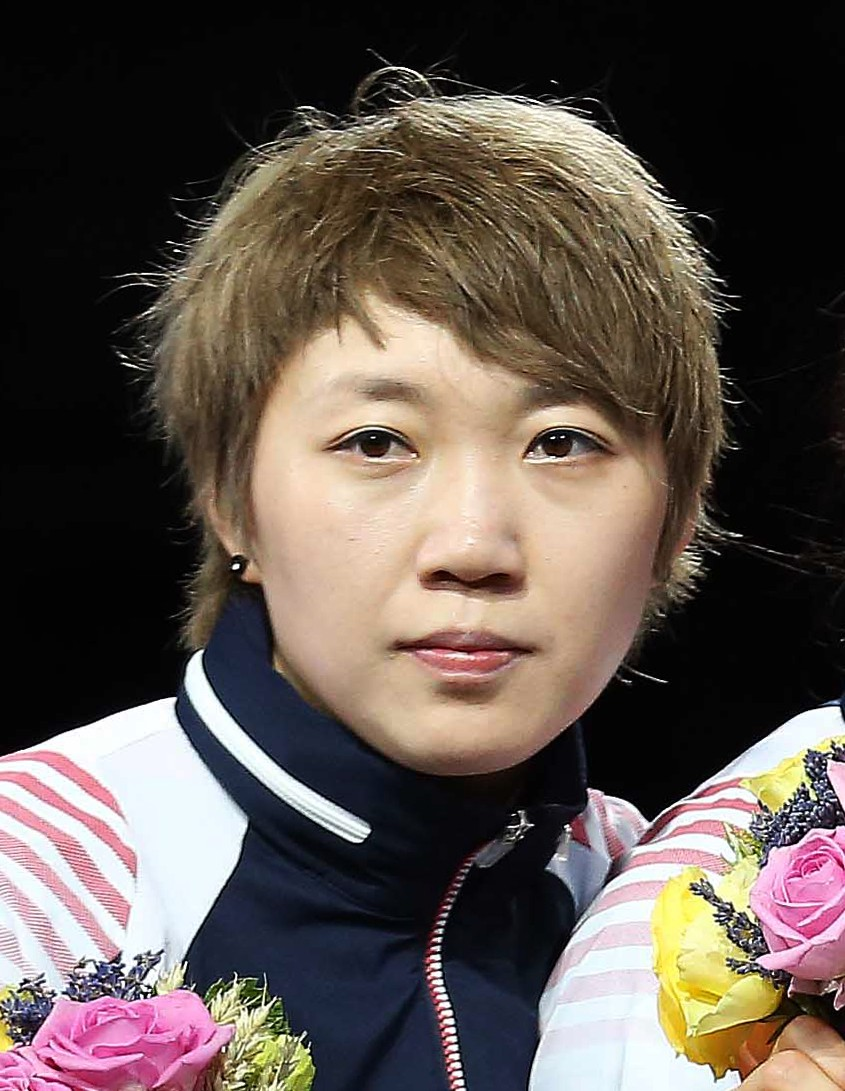

Personal information
- Native name: 정효정
- Nationality: South Korean
- Born: January 26, 1984 (age 42)

Sport
- Sport: Fencing
- Event: Épée
Medal record
Olympic Games
Silver medal – second place	2012 London	Team épée
World Championships
Bronze medal – third place	2010 Paris	Team épée
Asian Championships
Gold medal – first place	2010 Seoul	Épée
Asian Games
Silver medal – second place	2006 Doha	Team Épée
Bronze medal – third place	2010 Guangzhou	Team épée

Korean name
- Hangul: 정효정
- RR: Jeong Hyojeong
- MR: Chŏng Hyojŏng

Jung Hyo-jung (Korean: 정효정; Korean pronunciation: [tɕʌŋ.ɦjo.dʑʌŋ]; born January 26, 1984) is a South Korean épée fencer.

== Biography ==
Jung first drew attention at the 2002 World Junior Fencing Championships where she won a bronze medal in the women's individual épée. Jung won the individual épée gold medal at the 2010 Asian Fencing Championships, defeating Luo Xiaojuan of China 4–3 in the final. Jung also captured her first World Championship medal in the women's épée team event at the 2010 World Fencing Championships, leading the team alongside Shin A-lam.

She competed at the 2012 Summer Olympics, where she won a silver medal in the Women's team épée. In the individual event she was defeated in the second round.
