= CSA Steaua București (fencing) =

Romanian fencing team

- Full name: Clubul Sportiv al Armatei Steaua București
- Nickname: Roș-Albaștrii (The Red and Blues)
- Short name: Steaua
- Founded: 1947; 79 years ago
- Based in: Bucharest, Romania
- Colors
- President: Cristian Petrea
- Website: Club home page

The CSA Steaua București Fencing section was created in 1947 and is one of the most successful fencing teams in Romania.

== Achievements ==
Competition	Gold	Silver	Bronze	Total
Summer Olympic Games	2	2	5	9
World Championships	13	19	23	55
European Championships	7	12	13	32
Universiade and World Universiade Summer Games	7	9	5	21
World Cup	1	2	4	7
European Cup	13	13	28	54
World Championships CISM	14	22	10	46
Balkan Games	182	22	81	309

Competition		Winner
Romanian Championships	Seniors	326
Romanian Championships	Youths and Juniors	70
Romanian Championships	Kids	2
Romanian Cup		144

== Olympic champions ==
Year	Category	Name
1968	-Individual foil	Ion Drîmbă
1996	-Individual foil	Laura Badea-Cârlescu
