= Loredana Dinu =

Romanian épée fencer

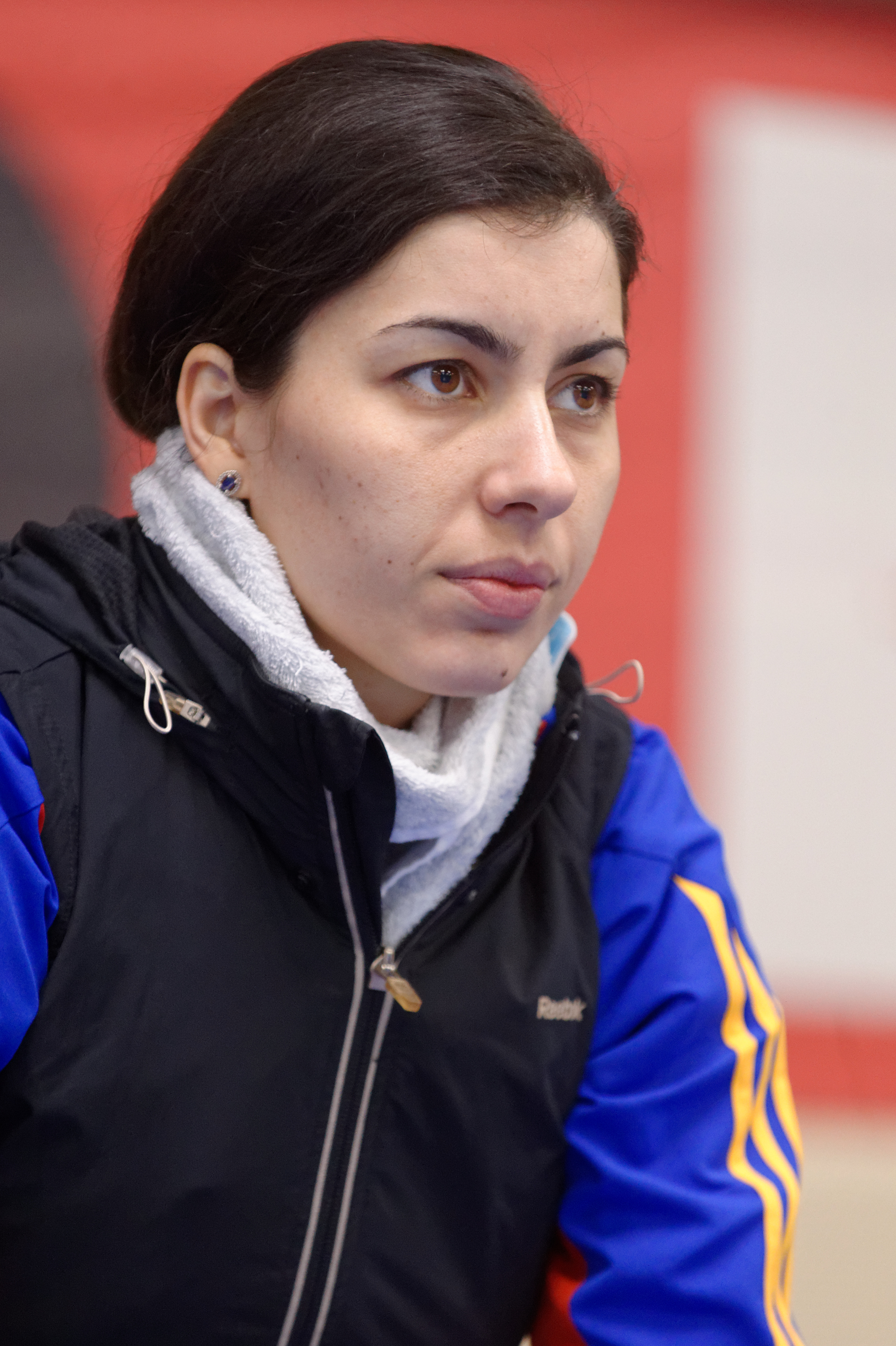
- 2012

Personal information
- Nationality: Romanian
- Born: 2 April 1984 (age 42) Craiova, Romania
- Height: 1.68 m (5 ft 6 in)
- Weight: 58 kg (128 lb; 9.1 st)

Fencing career
- Sport: Fencing
- Weapon: épée
- Hand: right-handed
- Club: CS Dinamo București
- FIE ranking: current rankings
Medal record
Olympic Games
Gold medal – first place	2016 Rio de Janeiro	Team
World Championships
Gold medal – first place	2010 Paris	Team
Gold medal – first place	2011 Catania	Team
Silver medal – second place	2015 Moscow	Team
European Championships
Gold medal – first place	2008 Kyiv	Team
Gold medal – first place	2011 Sheffield	Team
Silver medal – second place	2012 Legnano	Team

Loredana Dinu (born Iordăchioiu; born 2 April 1984) is a retired Romanian épée fencer, twice World champion and twice European champion with Romania.

== Biography ==
Dinu began fencing at age 11 after coaches from different sports did a presentation at her school. Her first coaches were Dumitru Popescu and Radu Mitrăchioiu. She took part in her first national championship at age 15; she was defeated in the final by Ana Maria Brânză, with whom she would later fence for Romania.

Dinu's first major results were a silver medal in the 2001 Junior World Championships and a bronze in the 2004 Junior World Championships. She won the team gold medal with Romania at both the 2010 and 2011 World Fencing Championships with Simona Alexandru, Ana Maria Brânză and Anca Măroiu. She competed in the women's team épée at the 2012 Summer Olympics in London, but Romania were defeated in thequarter-finals against South Korea and missed the podium. She decided to take a break from fencing after the Olympics.

In January 2015 Dinu announced she would come back to competition, this time as a member of CS Dinamo București. In May she won a bronze medal in the Romanian national championship and reached the quarter-finals at the Rio de Janeiro Grand Prix.
