= Ricarda Multerer =

German fencer (born 1990)

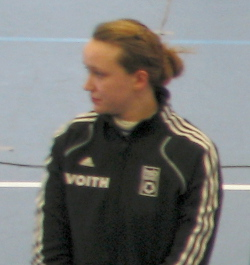
- Ricarda Multerer (2013)

Personal information
- Born: April 5, 1990 (age 36)
- Height: 180 cm (5 ft 11 in)
- Weight: 68 kg (150 lb)

Fencing career
- Sport: Fencing
- Country: Germany
- Weapon: Épée
- Hand: Right
- National coach: Piotr Sozanski
- FIE ranking: Current ranking

Ricarda Multerer (born 5 April 1990) is a German épée fencer. She is right-handed. Multerer competed at the 2012 Summer Olympics.
