= Monika Sozanska =

Polish- German épée fencer (born 1983)

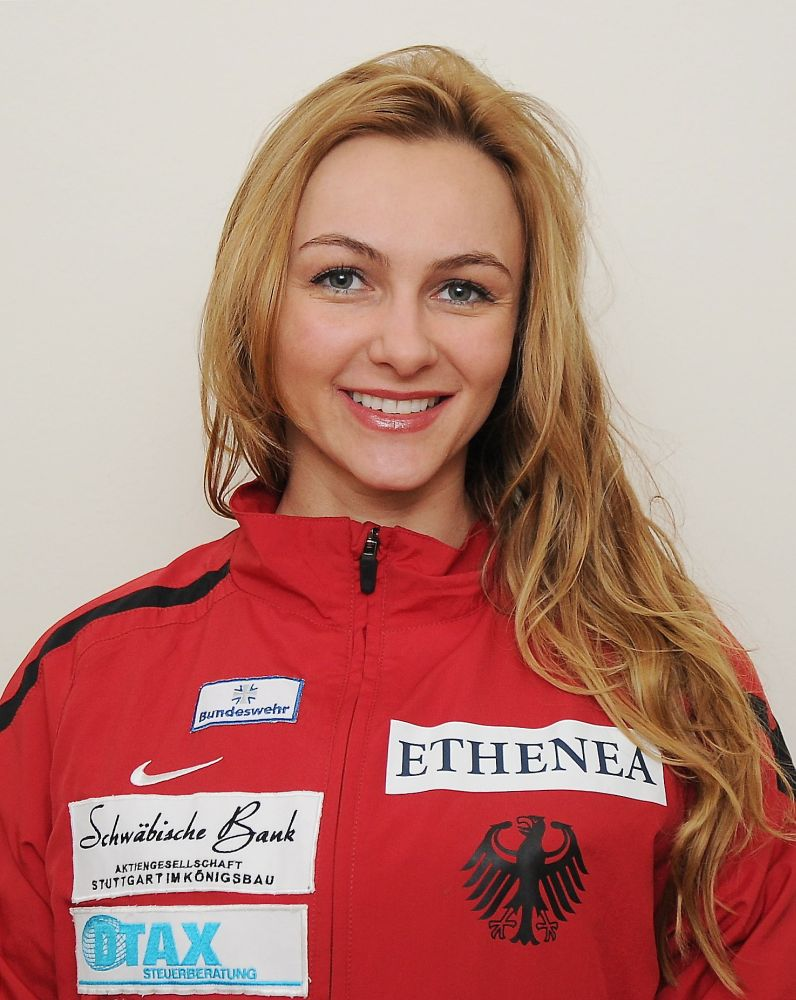

Personal information
- Nationality: Polish/German
- Born: 13 March 1983 (age 43) Bolesławiec, Poland
- Height: 1.63 m (5 ft 4 in)
- Weight: 50 kg (110 lb)

Fencing career
- Sport: Fencing
- Weapon: épée
- Hand: right-handed
- FIE ranking: current ranking
Medal record
Women's épée
Representing Germany
World Championships
Silver medal – second place	2010 Paris	Team épée
Bronze medal – third place	2005 Leipzig	Team épée
Bronze medal – third place	2009 Antalya	Team épée
Bronze medal – third place	2010 Beijing	Team épée
European Championships
Bronze medal – third place	2012 Legnano	Individual

Monika Sozanska (born 13 March 1983) is a Polish- German épée fencer. She has won several medals at the German Championships. Sozanska competed at the 2012 Summer Olympics.
