= Magdalena Piekarska =

Polish fencer (born 1986)

Personal information
- Nationality: Polish
- Born: 28 November 1986 (age 39) Warsaw, Poland
- Education: University of Lazarski
- Occupation: Lawyer
- Height: 1.92 m (6 ft 4 in)
- Weight: 74 kg (163 lb)

Sport
- Country: Poland
- Sport: Fencing
Medal record
World Championships
Silver medal – second place	2009 Antalya	Team
Bronze medal – third place	2017 Leipzig	Team
European Championships
Gold medal – first place	2010 Leipzig	Team
Gold medal – first place	2019 Düsseldorf	Team
Silver medal – second place	2009 Plovdiv	Team
Silver medal – second place	2010 Leipzig	Individual
Military World Games
Bronze medal – third place	2019 Wuhan	Individual

Magdalena Piekarska (born 28 November 1986) is a Polish fencer. She competed at the 2012 Summer Olympics in the Women's épée, but was defeated in the second round.

At the 2011 World Championships, she finished in 5th place in the individual and 6th in the team event. She had finished in 5th at the 2010 World Championships also.

She began fencing at 12.
