= Estonia at the 2015 European Games =

- IOC code: EST
- NOC: Estonian Olympic Committee
- Website: www.eok.ee

in Baku, Azerbaijan 12 – 28 June 2015
- Competitors: 59 in 12 sports
- Flag bearer: Heiki Nabi
- Medals Ranked 33rd: Gold 0 Silver 1 Bronze 2 Total 3

European Games appearances (overview)
- 2015; 2019; 2023; 2027

Estonia competed at the 2015 European Games, in Baku, Azerbaijan from 12 to 28 June 2015.

Estonia sent 59 competitors, while the total delegation was 97.

== Medalists ==
Medal	Name	Sport	Event	Date
Silver	Julia Beljajeva; Irina Embrich; Erika Kirpu; Katrina Lehis	Fencing	Women's team épée	26 June
Bronze	Heiki Nabi	Wrestling	Men's Greco-Roman 130 kg	14 June
Bronze	Erika Kirpu	Fencing	Women's épée	23 June

== Team ==
Estonia was represented by 59 athletes in 12 sports.

Sport	Men	Women	Total
Archery	1	1	2
Badminton	1	3	4
Basketball	4	0	4
Boxing	4	0	4
Cycling	5	3	8
Fencing	1	4	5
Judo	7	0	7
Shooting	2	2	4
Swimming	8	2	10
Triathlon	1	1	2
Volleyball	2	0	2
Wrestling	6	1	7
Total	42	17	59

== Archery ==
Athlete	Event	Ranking round		Round of 64	Round of 32	Round of 16	Quarterfinals	Semifinals	Final / BM	
Athlete	Event	Score	Seed	Opposition Score	Opposition Score	Opposition Score	Opposition Score	Opposition Score	Opposition Score	Rank
Jaanus Gross	Men's individual	636	49	Tekoniemi (Finland); L 1–7	Did not advance					33
Laura Nurmsalu	Women's individual	617	46	Marín (Spain); L 2–6	Did not advance					33
Laura Nurmsalu; Jaanus Gross	Mixed Team	1253	26	—		Did not advance				26

== Badminton ==
Athlete	Event	Group stage				Round of 16	Quarterfinals	Semifinals	Finals	Rank
Athlete	Event	Opposition Score	Opposition Score	Opposition Score	Rank	Opposition Score	Opposition Score	Opposition Score	Opposition Score	Rank
Raul Must	Men's singles	Domke (GER); W (23–21, 21–13)	Abián (ESP); L (19–21, 15–21)	Utroša (SLO); L (10–21, 10–21)	4	Did not advance				24
Kati Tolmoff	Women's singles	Magee (IRL); W (21–18, 21–17)	Tan (BEL); L (21–17, 12–21, 13–21)	Šefere (LAT); W (21–15, 21–13)	1 Q	Polikarpova (RUS); L (21–19, 15–21, 19–21)	Did not advance			9
Kristin Kuuba; Helina Rüütel	Women's doubles	Bott / Karnott (GER); L (12–21, 21–16, 17–21)	Cherniavskaya / Zaitsava (BLR); W (21–15, 21–15)	Grebak / Helsbøl (DEN); L (19–21, 9–21)	3	—	Did not advance			9

== Basketball (3x3) ==
Team	Event	Group stage				Round of 16	Quarterfinal	Semifinal	Final / BM	
Team	Event	Opposition Score	Opposition Score	Opposition Score	Rank	Opposition Score	Opposition Score	Opposition Score	Opposition Score	Rank
Martin Dorbek; Renato Lindmets; Ardi Oja; Siim Raudla	Men's tournament	Serbia (SRB); L 17–18	Greece (GRE); L 16–19	Italy (ITA); L 11–21	4 Q	Russia (RUS); L 18–19	Did not advance			

== Boxing ==
Athlete	Event	Round of 32	Round of 16	Quarterfinals	Semifinals	Final	
Athlete	Event	Opposition Result	Opposition Result	Opposition Result	Opposition Result	Opposition Result	Rank
Andrei Hartšenko	Men's 69 kg	Bye	Baraou (GER); L 0–3	Did not advance			
Ainar Karlson	Men's 81 kg	Drašković (MNE); L 1–2	Did not advance				
Rain Karlson	Men's 91 kg	Muzaffer (TUR); L 1–2	Did not advance				

== Cycling ==
=== Road cycling & mountain biking ===
Athlete	Event	Time	Rank
Martin Laas	Men's road race	5:33.39	28
Aksel Nõmmela	Men's road race	5:41.69	47
Risto Raid	Men's road race	5:41.79	49
Mihkel Räim	Men's road race	DNF	
Risto Raid	Men's time trial	DNS	
Liisi Rist	Women's road race	3:33.69	41
Liisi Rist	Women's time trial	36:21.96	24
Martin Loo	Men's cross country	1:46.21	11
Maaris Meier	Women's cross country	LAP	20

=== BMX ===
Athlete	Event	Qualifying Time Trial		Time Trial Super Final		Motos		Semifinals		Final	
Athlete	Event	Time	Rank	Time	Rank	Points	Rank	Time	Rank	Time	Rank
Ketlin Tekkel	Women's BMX	49.300	13	Did not advance		21	7	Did not advance			

== Fencing ==
Athlete	Event	Preliminaries		Round of 32	Round of 16	Quarterfinal	Semifinal	Final / BM	
Athlete	Event	Opposition Score	Rank	Opposition Score	Opposition Score	Opposition Score	Opposition Score	Opposition Score	Rank
Nikolai Novosjolov	Men's épée	von der Osten (DEN) W 5–4; Verwijlen (NED) W 5–1; Hanczvikkel (HUN) W 5–4; Cimini (ITA) W 5–2; Aliyev (AZE) L 4–5; Dobrev (BUL) W 5–1	1 Q	Bye	Khodos (RUS); L 12–15	Did not advance			
Julia Beljajeva	Women's épée	Bukócki (HUN) L 4–5; Nelip (POL) W 5–3; Samuelsson (SWE) W 5–4; Brânză (ROU) L 3–5; Khudaverdiyeva (AZE) W 5–3; Cipárová (SVK) W 5–2	2 Q	Fautsch (LUX); W 15–8	Andryushina (RUS); W 15–11	Kirpu (EST); L 11–15	Did not advance		
Irina Embrich	Women's épée	Fautsch (LUX) L 3–5; Pop (ROU) W 5–1; Sivkova (RUS) L 3–5; Heidemann (GER) L 1–5; Briasco (ITA) W 5–4; Várnai (HUN) W 5–2	4 Q	Lehis (EST); L 14–15	Did not advance				
Erika Kirpu	Women's épée	Bohus (HUN) L 3–5; Lawrence (GBR) W 5–0; Batini (ITA) L 3–5; Kochneva (RUS) L 1–5; Caran (SRB) W 5–1; Huseynova (AZE) W 5–2	3 Q	Samuelsson (SWE); W 15–11	Shemyakina (UKR); W 14–13	Beljajeva (EST); W 15–11	Brânză (ROU); L 11–12	Did not advance	3rd place, bronze medalist(s)
Katrina Lehis	Women's épée	Santuccio (ITA) W 5–1; Malikova (AZE) W 5–1; Andryushina (RUS) W 5–3; Kock (FIN) L 4–5; Shemyakina (UKR) L 4–5; Tătăran (ROU) L 3–5	3 Q	Embrich (EST); W 15–14	Brânză (ROU); L 12–15	Did not advance			
Julia Beljajeva; Irina Embrich; Erika Kirpu; Katrina Lehis	Women's team épée	—				Hungary (HUN); W 45–36	Italy (ITA); W 45–36	Romania (ROU); L 25–31	2nd place, silver medalist(s)

== Judo ==
Athlete	Event	Round of 64	Round of 32	Round of 16	Quarterfinals	Semifinals	Repechage	Final / BM	
Athlete	Event	Opposition Result	Opposition Result	Opposition Result	Opposition Result	Opposition Result	Opposition Result	Opposition Result	Rank
Iljas Avir	Men's 66 kg	—	Uriarte (ESP); L 000–100	Did not advance					
Künter Rothberg	Men's 73 kg	Laamanen (FIN); L 011–100	Did not advance						
Jevgeni Salejev	Men's 81 kg	Bye	Ovčiņņikovs (LAT); W 010–000	Tchrikishvili (GEO); L 000–100	Did not advance				
Kristjan Tõniste	Men's 81 kg	Nacimiento (ESP); L 001–101	Did not advance						
Aleksandr Marmeljuk	Men's 90 kg	Bye	Kukolj (SRB); L 000–100	Did not advance					
Grigori Minaškin	Men's 100 kg	—	Fonseca (POR); L 000–002	Did not advance					
Juhan Mettis	Men's +100 kg	—	Allerstorfer (AUT); W 100–000	Meyer (NED); L 000–000	Did not advance				

== Shooting ==
Athlete	Event	Qualification		Final	
Athlete	Event	Points	Rank	Points	Rank
Meelis Kiisk	Men's 10 m air rifle	622.2	19	Did not advance	
Meelis Kiisk	Men's 50 m rifle 3 positions	1140	22	Did not advance	
Meelis Kiisk	Men's 50 m rifle prone	616.0	8 Q	80.2	8
Peeter Olesk	Men's 10 m air pistol	570	26	Did not advance	
Peeter Olesk	Men's 25 m rapid fire pistol	559	20	Did not advance	
Veera Rumjantseva	Women's 10 m air pistol	360	34	Did not advance	
Veera Rumjantseva	Women's 25 m pistol	560	28	Did not advance	
Anžela Voronova	Women's 10 m air rifle	408.1	34	Did not advance	
Anžela Voronova	Women's 50 m rifle 3 positions	575	22	Did not advance	

== Swimming ==
Men

Athlete	Event	Heat		Semifinal		Final	
Athlete	Event	Time	Rank	Time	Rank	Time	Rank
Maksim Akavantsev	200 m breaststroke	2:30.07	33	Did not advance			
Andrei Gussev	50 m backstroke	26.65	16 Q	26.40	5	Did not advance	
Andrei Gussev	100 m backstroke	57.48	26	Did not advance			
Andrei Gussev	200 m backstroke	2:07.06	25	Did not advance			
Silver Hein	100 m breaststroke	1:04.92	27	Did not advance			
Silver Hein	200 m individual medley	2:09.64	33	Did not advance			
Silver Hein	400 m individual medley	4:37.83	36	—		Did not advance	
Werner-Erich Kulla	50 m breaststroke	29.32	=23	Did not advance			
Karel Seli	50 m breaststroke	30.34	37	Did not advance			
Karel Seli	100 m breaststroke	1:07.77	37	Did not advance			
Karel Seli	200 m individual medley	2:16.58	45	Did not advance			
Cevin Anders Siim	50 m butterfly	25.49	39	Did not advance			
Cevin Anders Siim	100 m butterfly	56.38	34	Did not advance			
Cevin Anders Siim	100 m freestyle	51.91	36	Did not advance			
Daniel Zaitsev	50 m freestyle	23.07	6 Q	23.00	4 q	22.99	8
Daniel Zaitsev	50 m butterfly	24.49	10 Q	24.43	6	Did not advance	
Daniel Zaitsev	100 m butterfly	54.22	7 Q	54.05	3 q	54.15	7
Nikita Tšernõšev	50 m freestyle	23.33	14 Q	23.21	3	Did not advance	
Nikita Tšernõšev	100 m freestyle	52.14	=44	Did not advance			
Andrei Gussev; Cevin Anders Siim; Daniel Zaitsev; Nikita Tšernõšev	4 × 100 m freestyle relay	3:27.40	9	—		Did not advance	
Andrei Gussev; Silver Hein; Cevin Anders Siim; Daniel Zaitsev	4 × 100 m medley relay	3:49.80	9	—		Did not advance	

Women

Athlete	Event	Heat		Semifinal		Final	
Athlete	Event	Time	Rank	Time	Rank	Time	Rank
Kertu Ly Alnek	50 m freestyle	27.24	31	Did not advance			
Kertu Ly Alnek	100 m freestyle	58.61	27	Did not advance			
Kertu Ly Alnek	200 m freestyle	2:08.59	39	Did not advance			
Margaret Markvardt	50 m backstroke	30.40	23	Did not advance			
Margaret Markvardt	50 m butterfly	28.34	22	Did not advance			
Margaret Markvardt	100 m butterfly	1:04.09	28	Did not advance			
Margaret Markvardt	200 m individual medley	2:23.69	22	Did not advance			
Margaret Markvardt	400 m individual medley	5:05.08	13	Did not advance			

Mixed

Athlete	Event	Heat		Semifinal		Final	
Athlete	Event	Time	Rank	Time	Rank	Time	Rank
Kertu Ly Alnek; Margaret Markvardt; Cevin Anders Siim; Daniel Zaitsev	4 × 100 m freestyle relay	3:39.83	7 Q	—		3:38.32	6

== Triathlon ==
Athlete	Event	Swim (1.5 km)	Trans 1	Bike (40 km)	Trans 2	Run (10 km)	Total Time	Rank
Kaidi Kivioja	Women's	23:15	0:48	1:07:02	0:27	37:23	2:08:55	28
Aleksandr Latin	Men's	19:31	0:47	55:51	0:28	32:44	1:49:21	4

== Volleyball ==
Athlete	Event	Preliminary round		Round of 24	Round of 16	Quarterfinals	Semifinals	Final / BM	
Athlete	Event	Opposition Score	Rank	Opposition Score	Opposition Score	Opposition Result	Opposition Result	Opposition Result	Rank
Kristo Kollo; Rivo Vesik	Men's	Marco – García (ESP); W (21–18, 15–21, 19–17); Winter – Petutsching (AUT); L (15–21, 16–21); Sheaf – Gregory (GBR); W (21–19, 21–15)	2 q	Salvetti – Daguerre (FRA); L (18–21, 18–21)	Did not advance				

== Wrestling ==
Athlete	Event	Qualification	Round of 16	Quarterfinal	Semifinal	Repechage 1	Repechage 2	Final / BM	
Athlete	Event	Opposition Result	Opposition Result	Opposition Result	Opposition Result	Opposition Result	Opposition Result	Opposition Result	Rank
Aleksei Baskakov	Men's freestyle 57 kg	Kalanidis (GRE); W 8–2	Akgül (TUR); L 0–6	Did not advance					
Ragnar Kaasik	Men's freestyle 97 kg	Saidov (BLR); L 0–10	Did not advance						
Silver Tõgen	Men's Greco-Roman 75 kg	Sevciuc (MDA); L 2–10	Did not advance						
Eerik Aps	Men's Greco-Roman 85 kg	Bye	Sandahl (SWE); W 3–2	Žugaj (CRO); L 0–5	Did not advance				
Ardo Arusaar	Men's Greco-Roman 98 kg	Metodiev (BUL); W 5–0	Magomedov (RUS); L 0–3	Did not advance		Hassler (GER); W 3–1	Nuriyev (AZE); L 0–2	Did not advance	
Heiki Nabi	Men's Greco-Roman 130 kg	—	Bye	Lönnborn (SWE); W 7–0	Kayaalp (TUR); L 0–7	Bye		Lám (HUN); W 1–0	3rd place, bronze medalist(s)
Epp Mäe	Women's 75 kg	—	Saenko (MDA); L 3–8	Did not advance					
