= Fencing at the 2015 European Games – Women's épée =

Women's épée at the 2015 European Games
- Venue: Crystal Hall 3
- Date: 23 June
- Competitors: 35 from 17 nations

Medalists
gold medal	Ana Maria Brânză	Romania
silver medal	Yana Zvereva	Russia
bronze medal	Erika Kirpu	Estonia
bronze medal	Simona Gherman	Romania

The women's épée competition at the 2015 European Games in Baku was held on 23 June at the Crystal Hall 3.

== Schedule ==
All times are local (UTC+5).

Date	Time	Event
Tuesday, 23 June 2015	09:00	Preliminaries
Tuesday, 23 June 2015	11:30	Round of 32
Tuesday, 23 June 2015	12:40	Round of 16
Tuesday, 23 June 2015	13:30	Quarterfinals
Tuesday, 23 June 2015	18:15	Semifinals
Tuesday, 23 June 2015	19:30	Final

== Results ==
=== Preliminaries ===
==== Pool A ====
Seed	Athlete	(Hungary)	(Poland)	(Sweden)	(Romania)	(Azerbaijan)	(Estonia)	(Slovakia)	V	B	V/B	HS	HR	Diff.	RP	RT
34	Bianka Bukócki (HUN)		V4	2	1	V	V	V	4	6	0.667	22	21	1	3	12
12	Ewa Nelip (POL)	3		V	3	V	3	V	3	6	0.500	24	20	4	4	15
20	Emma Samuelsson (SWE)	V	3		2	V	4	V	3	6	0.500	24	21	3	5	17
1	Ana Maria Brânză (ROU)	V	V4	V		V	V	3	5	6	0.833	27	15	12	1	4
30	Elmira Khudaverdiyeva (AZE)	2	0	2	1		3	3	0	6	0.000	11	30	–19	7	=33
9	Julia Beljajeva (EST)	4	V	V	3	V		V	4	6	0.667	27	22	5	2	9
21	Dagmar Cipárová (SVK)	2	4	2	V	V	2		2	6	0.333	20	26	–6	6	29

==== Pool B ====
Seed	Athlete	(Estonia)	(Hungary)	(United Kingdom)	(Italy)	(Russia)	(Serbia)	(Azerbaijan)	V	B	V/B	HS	HR	Diff.	RP	RT
2	Erika Kirpu (EST)		3	V	3	1	V	V	3	6	0.500	22	18	4	3	16
29	Réka Bohus (HUN)	V		3	2	2	2	V	2	6	0.333	19	24	–5	6	27
13	Corinna Lawrence (GBR)	0	V		2	2	V	V	3	6	0.500	19	22	–3	4	22
18	Camilla Batini (ITA)	V	V	V		V4	V	V	6	6	1.000	29	18	11	1	2
10	Olga Kochneva (RUS)	V	V	V3	3		V	V	5	6	0.833	26	12	14	2	3
22	Romana Caran (SRB)	1	V	3	4	3		V	2	6	0.333	21	25	–4	5	26
31	Samira Huseynova (AZE)	2	1	3	4	0	3		0	6	0.000	13	30	–17	7	32

==== Pool C ====
Seed	Athlete	(Italy)	(Azerbaijan)	(Russia)	(Finland)	(Ukraine)	(Romania)	(Estonia)	V	B	V/B	HS	HR	Diff.	RP	RT
17	Alberta Santuccio (ITA)		V	1	V4	2	V	1	3	6	0.500	18	23	–5	5	23
32	Maryam Malikova (AZE)	4		1	0	3	2	1	0	6	0.000	11	30	–19	7	=33
8	Tatyana Andryushina (RUS)	V	V		4	2	4	3	2	6	0.333	23	22	1	6	25
23	Catharina Kock (FIN)	1	V	V		3	3	V	3	6	0.500	22	22	0	4	=20
3	Yana Shemyakina (UKR)	V	V	V	V		V	V	6	6	1.000	30	16	14	1	1
25	Amalia Tătăran (ROU)	3	V	V	V	2		V	4	6	0.667	25	22	3	2	11
11	Katrina Lehis (EST)	V	V	V	4	4	3		3	6	0.500	26	20	6	3	13

==== Pool D ====
Seed	Athlete	(Estonia)	(Luxembourg)	(Romania)	(Russia)	(Germany)	(Italy)	(Hungary)	V	B	V/B	HS	HR	Diff.	RP	RT
7	Irina Embrich (EST)		3	V	3	1	V	V	3	6	0.500	22	22	0	4	=20
24	Lis Fautsch (LUX)	V		4	V	4	4	4	2	6	0.333	26	25	1	5	24
14	Simona Pop (ROU)	1	V		2	2	V	3	2	6	0.333	18	27	–9	6	=30
15	Anna Sivkova (RUS)	V	2	V		V	V	V	5	6	0.833	27	18	9	1	5
4	Britta Heidemann (GER)	V	V	V	4		2	V	4	6	0.667	26	20	6	2	8
27	Brenda Briasco (ITA)	4	V	3	4	V		V	3	6	0.500	26	24	2	3	18
35	Vivien Várnai (HUN)	2	V	V	0	3	3		2	6	0.333	18	27	–9	6	=30

==== Pool E ====
Seed	Athlete	(Romania)	(Israel)	(Hungary)	(Austria)	(Italy)	(Russia)	(Azerbaijan)	V	B	V/B	HS	HR	Diff.	RP	RT
5	Simona Gherman (ROU)		V	4	V	4	3	V	3	6	0.500	26	21	5	4	14
19	Avital Marinuk (ISR)	2		2	4	V	V	V	3	6	0.500	23	23	0	5	19
28	Anna Kun (HUN)	V	V		V	4	4	V	4	6	0.667	28	20	8	2	7
26	Paula Schmidl (AUT)	4	V	2		4	2	V	2	6	0.333	22	28	–6	6	28
16	Giulia Rizzi (ITA)	V	2	V	V		V	V	5	6	0.833	27	19	8	1	6
6	Yana Zvereva (RUS)	V	4	V	V	2		V	4	6	0.667	26	22	4	3	10
33	Nubar Malikova (AZE)	0	2	2	4	0	3		0	6	0.000	11	30	–19	7	=33

=== Knockout round ===
==== Final ====
Final
4	Ana Maria Brânză (ROU)	15
10	Yana Zvereva (RUS)	11

==== Top half ====
Round of 32
17	Emma Samuelsson (SWE)	11
16	Erika Kirpu (EST)	15
9	Julia Beljajeva (EST)	15
24	Lis Fautsch (LUX)	8
25	Tatyana Andryushina (RUS)	15
8	Britta Heidemann (GER)	14
21	Catharina Kock (FIN)	15
12	Bianka Bukócki (HUN)	12
13	Katrina Lehis (EST)	15
20	Irina Embrich (EST)	14

Round of 16
1	Yana Shemyakina (UKR)	13
16	Erika Kirpu (EST)	14
9	Julia Beljajeva (EST)	15
25	Tatyana Andryushina (RUS)	11
5	Anna Sivkova (RUS)	14
21	Catharina Kock (FIN)	15
13	Katrina Lehis (EST)	12
4	Ana Maria Brânză (ROU)	15

Quarterfinals
16	Erika Kirpu (EST)	15
9	Julia Beljajeva (EST)	11
21	Catharina Kock (FIN)	4
4	Ana Maria Brânză (ROU)	15

Semifinals
16	Erika Kirpu (EST)	11
4	Ana Maria Brânză (ROU)	12

==== Bottom half ====
Round of 32
19	Avital Marinuk (ISR)	9
14	Simona Gherman (ROU)	15
11	Amalia Tătăran (ROU)	10
22	Corinna Lawrence (GBR)	15
27	Réka Bohus (HUN)	7
6	Giulia Rizzi (ITA)	15
7	Anna Kun (HUN)	15
26	Romana Caran (SRB)	7
23	Alberta Santuccio (ITA)	10
10	Yana Zvereva (RUS)	13
15	Ewa Nelip (POL)	15
18	Brenda Briasco (ITA)	14

Round of 16
3	Olga Kochneva (RUS)	10
14	Simona Gherman (ROU)	15
22	Corinna Lawrence (GBR)	12
6	Giulia Rizzi (ITA)	15
7	Anna Kun (HUN)	10
10	Yana Zvereva (RUS)	15
18	Ewa Nelip (POL)	15
2	Camilla Batini (ITA)	11

Quarterfinals
14	Simona Gherman (ROU)	15
6	Giulia Rizzi (ITA)	10
10	Yana Zvereva (RUS)	14
18	Ewa Nelip (POL)	11

Semifinals
14	Simona Gherman (ROU)	8
10	Yana Zvereva (RUS)	15
