= Fencing at the 2015 European Games – Women's team épée =

Women's team épée at the 2015 European Games
- Venue: Crystal Hall 3
- Date: 26 June
- Competitors: 24 from 6 nations

Medalists
gold medal	Ana Maria Brânză; Simona Gherman; Simona Pop; Amalia Tătăran	Romania
silver medal	Julia Beljajeva; Irina Embrich; Erika Kirpu; Katrina Lehis	Estonia
bronze medal	Camilla Batini; Brenda Briasco; Giulia Rizzi; Alberta Santuccio	Italy

The women's team épée competition at the 2015 European Games in Baku was held on 26 June at the Crystal Hall 3.

== Results ==
Quarterfinals
Hungary	36
Estonia	45
Russia	45
Azerbaijan	19

Semifinals
Italy	36
Estonia	45
Russia	24
Romania	31

Final
Estonia	25
Romania	31
Third place
Italy	40
Russia	36

Fifth place
Hungary	45
Azerbaijan	25

== Final standing ==
Rank	Team
1st place, gold medalist(s)	Romania; Ana Maria Brânză; Simona Gherman; Simona Pop; Amalia Tătăran
2nd place, silver medalist(s)	Estonia; Julia Beljajeva; Irina Embrich; Erika Kirpu; Katrina Lehis
3rd place, bronze medalist(s)	Italy; Camilla Batini; Brenda Briasco; Giulia Rizzi; Alberta Santuccio
4	Russia; Tatyana Andryushina; Olga Kochneva; Anna Sivkova; Yana Zvereva
5	Hungary; Réka Bohus; Bianka Bukócki; Anna Kun; Vivien Várnai
6	Azerbaijan; Samira Huseynova; Elmira Khudaverdiyeva; Maryam Malikova; Nubar Malikova
