= Estonia at the 2020 Summer Olympics =

- IOC code: EST
- NOC: Estonian Olympic Committee
- Website: www.eok.ee (in Estonian)

in Tokyo, Japan July 23, 2021 – August 8, 2021
- Competitors: 33 in 14 sports
- Flag bearers (opening): Dina Ellermann; Tõnu Endrekson
- Flag bearer (closing): Maicel Uibo
- Medals Ranked 59th: Gold 1 Silver 0 Bronze 1 Total 2

Summer Olympics appearances (overview)
- 1920; 1924; 1928; 1932; 1936; 1948–1988; 1992; 1996; 2000; 2004; 2008; 2012; 2016; 2020; 2024; 2028

Other related appearances
- Russian Empire (1908–1912); Soviet Union (1952–1988)

Estonia competed at the 2020 Summer Olympics in Tokyo. Originally scheduled to take place from 24 July to 9 August 2020, the Games were postponed to 23 July to 8 August 2021, because of the COVID-19 pandemic. It was the nation's eighth consecutive appearance at the Games since 1992 and thirteenth overall in Summer Olympic history.

Estonian government rewards their Olympic gold medalists with a lifetime allowance of 4,600 euros annually with additional support when they approach the retirement age.

== Medalists ==
Medal	Name	Sport	Event	Date
Gold	Julia Beljajeva; Irina Embrich; Erika Kirpu; Katrina Lehis	Fencing	Women's team épée	27 July
Bronze	Katrina Lehis	Fencing	Women's épée	24 July

== Competitors ==
The following is the list of number of competitors in the Games.

Sport	Men	Women	Total
Archery	0	1	1
Athletics	6	1	7
Badminton	1	1	2
Cycling	2	1	3
Equestrian	0	1	1
Fencing	0	4	4
Judo	1	0	1
Rowing	4	0	4
Sailing	1	1	2
Shooting	1	0	1
Swimming	2	1	3
Tennis	0	1	1
Triathlon	0	1	1
Wrestling	1	1	2
Total	19	14	33

== Archery ==
Estonia archers booked Olympic places in the women's individual recurve based on the world ranking.

Athlete	Event	Ranking round		Round of 64	Round of 32	Round of 16	Quarterfinals	Semifinals	Final / BM	
Athlete	Event	Score	Seed	Opposition Score	Opposition Score	Opposition Score	Opposition Score	Opposition Score	Opposition Score	Rank
Reena Pärnat	Women's individual	626	53	Baránková (SVK); W 6–4	Lin C-e (TPE); L 3–7	Did not advance				

== Athletics ==
Estonian athletes achieved the entry standards, either by qualifying time/result or by world ranking, in the following track and field events (up to a maximum of 3 athletes in each event):

Key

- Note–Ranks given for track events are within the athlete's heat only
- Q = Qualified for the next round
- q = Qualified for the next round as a fastest loser or, in field events, by position without achieving the qualifying target
- NR = National record
- N/A = Round not applicable for the event
- Bye = Athlete not required to compete in round

Track & road events

Athlete	Event	Heat		Semifinal		Final	
Athlete	Event	Time	Rank	Time	Rank	Time	Rank
Rasmus Mägi	Men's 400 m hurdles	48.73	2 Q	48.36 NR	2 Q	48.11 NR	7
Roman Fosti	Men's marathon	—N/a				2:25:37	68
Tiidrek Nurme	Men's marathon	—N/a				2:16:16	27

Field events

Athlete	Event	Qualification		Final	
Athlete	Event	Distance	Position	Distance	Position
Ksenija Balta	Women's long jump	NM	—	Did not advance	

Combined events – Men's decathlon

Athlete	Event	100 m	LJ	SP	HJ	400 m	110H	DT	PV	JT	1500 m	Final	Rank
Johannes Erm	Result	11.04	7.36	14.60	1.99	48.25	14.55	45.72	4.80	58.41	4:28.42 PB	8213	11
Johannes Erm	Points	852	900	765	794	897	905	782	849	714	755	8213	11
Karel Tilga	Result	11.31	6.77	15.25	2.02	50.48	16.10	41.31	NM	73.36 PB	4:38.24	7018	20
Karel Tilga	Points	793	760	805	822	793	722	691	0	941	691	7018	20
Maicel Uibo	Result	11.32	7.37	13.95	2.02	50.82	14.83	46.38	5.50 PB	50.64	4:38.64	8037	15
Maicel Uibo	Points	791	903	725	822	777	870	795	1067	598	689	8037	15

== Badminton ==
Estonia entered two badminton players (one per gender) into the Olympic tournament. Three-time Olympian Raul Must and rookie Kristin Kuuba were selected into the Olympic based on the BWF World Race to Tokyo Rankings. In the group stage, Must will be played in the group N, while Kuuba in the group D.

Athlete	Event	Group Stage			Elimination	Quarterfinal	Semifinal	Final / BM	
Athlete	Event	Opposition Score	Opposition Score	Rank	Opposition Score	Opposition Score	Opposition Score	Opposition Score	Rank
Raul Must	Men's singles	Chen L (CHN); L (10–21, 9–21)	Abián (ESP); L (7–21, 11–21)	3	Did not advance				
Kristin Kuuba	Women's singles	Macías (PER); W (21–19, 21–13)	Ongbamrungphan (THA); L (16–21, 12–21)	2	Did not advance				

== Cycling ==
=== Road ===
Estonia entered two riders to compete in the men's Olympic road race, by virtue of their top 50 national finish (for men) in the UCI World Ranking.

Athlete	Event	Time	Rank
Tanel Kangert	Men's road race	6:15:38	46
Tanel Kangert	Men's time trial	59:05.25	22
Peeter Pruus	Men's road race	Did not finish	

=== Mountain biking ===
Estonia qualified one mountain biker for the women's Olympic cross-country race, as a result of her nation's seventeenth-place finish in the UCI Olympic Ranking List of 16 May 2021.

Athlete	Event	Time	Rank
Janika Lõiv	Women's cross-country	1:23:17	17

== Equestrian ==
With Belarus withdrawing from the tournament, Estonia received an invitation from FEI to send a dressage rider to the Games, as the next highest-ranked eligible nation within the individual FEI Olympic Rankings for Group C (Central & Eastern Europe, Central Asia). This outcome signified the nation's Olympic debut in the equestrian disciplines.

=== Dressage ===
Athlete	Horse	Event	Grand Prix		Grand Prix Freestyle		Overall	
Athlete	Horse	Event	Score	Rank	Technical	Artistic	Score	Rank
Dina Ellermann	Donna Anna	Individual	65.435	49	Did not advance			

== Fencing ==
Estonian fencers qualified a full squad each in the women's team épée for the Games by accepting a spare berth freed up by Africa as the next highest-ranked eligible nation across all regions in the FIE Olympic Team Rankings.

Athlete	Event	Round of 64	Round of 32	Round of 16	Quarterfinal	Semifinal	Final / BM	
Athlete	Event	Opposition Score	Opposition Score	Opposition Score	Opposition Score	Opposition Score	Opposition Score	Rank
Julia Beljajeva	Women's épée	Bye	Vitalis (FRA); W 15–5	Sato (JPN); W 15–10	Popescu (ROU); L 8–15	Did not advance		
Erika Kirpu	Women's épée	Bye	Hurley (USA); L 14–15	Did not advance				
Katrina Lehis	Women's épée	Bye	Trzebińska (POL); W 11–10	Navarria (ITA); W 15–10	Fiamingo (ITA); W 15–7	Popescu (ROU); L 11–15	Murtazaeva (ROC); W 15–8	3rd place, bronze medalist(s)
Julia Beljajeva; Irina Embrich; Erika Kirpu; Katrina Lehis	Women's team épée	—N/a			Poland; W 29–26	Italy; W 42–34	South Korea; W 36–32	1st place, gold medalist(s)

== Judo ==
Estonia entered one male judoka into the Olympic tournament based on the International Judo Federation Olympics Individual Ranking.

Athlete	Event	Round of 32	Round of 16	Quarterfinals	Semifinals	Repechage	Final / BM	
Athlete	Event	Opposition Result	Opposition Result	Opposition Result	Opposition Result	Opposition Result	Opposition Result	Rank
Grigori Minaškin	Men's –100 kg	Lkhagvasüren (MGL); L 00–01	Did not advance					

== Rowing ==
Estonia qualified one boat in the men's quadruple sculls for the Games by winning the gold medal and securing the first of two remaining berths at the 2021 FISA Final Qualification Regatta in Lucerne, Switzerland.

Athlete	Event	Heats		Repechage		Final	
Athlete	Event	Time	Rank	Time	Rank	Time	Rank
Tõnu Endrekson; Allar Raja; Kaspar Taimsoo; Jüri-Mikk Udam	Men's quadruple sculls	5:47.12	3 R	5:56.52	2 FA	5:38.58	6

Qualification Legend: FA=Final A (medal); R=Repechage

== Sailing ==
Estonian sailors qualified one boat in each of the following classes through the 2018 Sailing World Championships, the class-associated Worlds, and the continental regattas.

Athlete	Event	Race													Net points	Final rank
Athlete	Event	1	2	3	4	5	6	7	8	9	10	11	12	M*	Net points	Final rank
Karl-Martin Rammo	Men's Laser	16	13	19	8	1	21	12	25	1	~~26~~	—N/a		EL	116	15
Ingrid Puusta	Women's RS:X	15	12	16	10	14	17	17	17	17	~~18~~	13	18	EL	166	16

M = Medal race; EL = Eliminated – did not advance into the medal race

== Shooting ==
Estonia granted an invitation from ISSF to send Rio 2016 Olympian Peeter Olesk (men's 25 m rapid fire pistol) to the rescheduled Games as the highest-ranked shooter vying for qualification in the ISSF World Olympic Rankings of 6 June 2021.

Athlete	Event	Qualification		Final	
Athlete	Event	Points	Rank	Points	Rank
Peeter Olesk	Men's 10 m air pistol	564	33	Did not advance	
Peeter Olesk	Men's 25 m rapid fire pistol	572	19	Did not advance	

== Swimming ==
Estonian swimmers further achieved qualifying standards in the following events (up to a maximum of 2 swimmers in each event at the Olympic Qualifying Time (OQT), and potentially 1 at the Olympic Selection Time (OST)):

Athlete	Event	Heat		Semifinal		Final	
Athlete	Event	Time	Rank	Time	Rank	Time	Rank
Martin Allikvee	Men's 200 m breaststroke	2:12.60	25	Did not advance			
Kregor Zirk	Men's 200 m freestyle	1:46.10 NR	11 Q	1:46.67	13	Did not advance	
Kregor Zirk	Men's 400 m freestyle	3:47.05 NR	15	—N/a		Did not advance	
Kregor Zirk	Men's 100 m butterfly	52.82	41	Did not advance			
Kregor Zirk	Men's 200 m butterfly	1:57.26	25	Did not advance			
Eneli Jefimova	Women's 100 m breaststroke	1:06.79	14 Q	1:07.58	16	Did not advance	
Eneli Jefimova	Women's 200 m breaststroke	2:27.87	27	Did not advance			

== Tennis ==
At the conclusion of the qualification period for the Olympic tennis tournament, Estonia qualified one tennis player by means of ranking.

Athlete	Event	Round of 64	Round of 32	Round of 16	Quarterfinals	Semifinals	Final / BM	
Athlete	Event	Opposition Score	Opposition Score	Opposition Score	Opposition Score	Opposition Score	Opposition Score	Rank
Anett Kontaveit	Women's singles	Sakkari (GRE); L 5–7, 2–6	Did not advance					

== Triathlon ==
Estonia qualified one triathlete by means of world individual ranking.

Athlete	Event	Time						Rank
Athlete	Event	Swim (1.5 km)	Trans 1	Bike (40 km)	Trans 2	Run (10 km)	Total	Rank
Kaidi Kivioja	Women's	21:40	0:48	Lapped				

== Wrestling ==
Estonia qualified two wrestlers for each of the following weight classes into the Olympic competition, all of whom finished among the top six to book Olympic spots in the men's Greco-Roman 130 kg and women's freestyle 76 kg, respectively, at the 2019 World Championships.

Key:

- VT (ranking points: 5–0 or 0–5) – Victory by fall.
- VB (ranking points: 5–0 or 0–5) – Victory by injury (VF for forfeit, VA for withdrawal or disqualification)
- PP (ranking points: 3–1 or 1–3) – Decision by points – the loser with technical points.
- PO (ranking points: 3–0 or 0–3) – Decision by points – the loser without technical points.
- ST (ranking points: 4–0 or 0–4) – Great superiority – the loser without technical points and a margin of victory of at least 8 (Greco-Roman) or 10 (freestyle) points.
- SP (ranking points: 4–1 or 1–4) – Technical superiority – the loser with technical points and a margin of victory of at least 8 (Greco-Roman) or 10 (freestyle) points.

Freestyle

Athlete	Event	Round of 16	Quarterfinal	Semifinal	Repechage	Final / BM	
Athlete	Event	Opposition Result	Opposition Result	Opposition Result	Opposition Result	Opposition Result	Rank
Epp Mäe	Women's –76 kg	Wiebe (CAN); W 3–1 ^{PP}	Minagawa (JPN); L 0–3 ^{PO}	Did not advance			8

Greco-Roman

Athlete	Event	Round of 16	Quarterfinal	Semifinal	Repechage	Final / BM	
Athlete	Event	Opposition Result	Opposition Result	Opposition Result	Opposition Result	Opposition Result	Rank
Artur Vititin	Men's –130 kg	Abdullaev (UZB); L 0–4 ^{ST}	Did not advance				15
