= Fencing at the 2015 European Games =

- Venue: Crystal Hall 3, Baku
- Dates: 23–27 June
- Competitors: 214 from 34 nations

The fencing competitions at the 2015 European Games in Baku were held from 23 to 27 June 2015 at the Crystal Hall 3. Twelve events (six individual, six team) were contested. This is two more than the Olympic Games programme, and means all three formats had a team event in each gender.

== Qualification ==
216 athletes will compete across the twelve events. The quota places will be awarded based on the FIE rankings at 30 November 2014. In December 2014, a qualification tournament will be held to decide the universality quota places.

== Timetable ==
OC	Opening ceremony	●	Event competitions	1	Event finals	CC	Closing ceremony

June	12th Fri	13th Sat	14th Sun	15th Mon	16th Tue	17th Wed	18th Thu	19th Fri	20th Sat	21st Sun	22nd Mon	23rd Tue	24th Wed	25th Thu	26th Fri	27th Sat	28th Sun	Events
Fencing	OC											2	2	2	3	3	CC	12

== Events summary ==
=== Men's ===
Event	Gold	Silver	Bronze
Individual épée	Iván Trevejo; France	Sergey Khodos; Russia	Daniel Jérent; France Bartosz Piasecki; Norway
Team épée	France; Yannick Borel; Ronan Gustin; Daniel Jérent; Iván Trevejo	Russia; Sergey Bida; Anton Glebko; Dmitriy Gusev; Sergey Khodos	Italy; Gabriele Bino; Gabriele Cimini; Marco Fichera; Andrea Santarelli
Individual foil	Alessio Foconi; Italy	Timur Arslanov; Russia	Jean-Paul Tony Helissey; France Francesco Ingargiola; Italy
Team foil	Great Britain; Richard Kruse; Marcus Mepstead; Benjamin Peggs; Alex Tofalides	Italy; Alessio Foconi; Francesco Ingargiola; Lorenzo Nista; Damiano Rosatelli	Russia; Timur Arslanov; Aleksey Khovanskiy; Timur Safin; Dmitry Zherebchenko
Individual sabre	Andriy Yahodka; Ukraine	Tiberiu Dolniceanu; Romania	Luigi Miracco; Italy Alberto Pellegrini; Italy
Team sabre	Italy; Luigi Miracco; Massimiliano Murolo; Alberto Pellegrini; Giovanni Repetti	Romania; Alin Badea; Mădălin Bucur; Tiberiu Dolniceanu; Iulian Teodosiu	Germany; Richard Hübers; Björn Hübner; Maximilian Kindler; Robin Schrödter

=== Women's ===
Event	Gold	Silver	Bronze
Individual épée	Ana Maria Brânză; Romania	Yana Zvereva; Russia	Simona Gherman; Romania Erika Kirpu; Estonia
Team épée	Romania; Ana Maria Brânză; Simona Gherman; Simona Pop; Amalia Tătăran	Estonia; Julia Beljajeva; Irina Embrich; Erika Kirpu; Katrina Lehis	Italy; Camilla Batini; Brenda Briasco; Giulia Rizzi; Alberta Santuccio
Individual foil	Alice Volpi; Italy	Yana Alborova; Russia	Adelina Zagidullina; Russia Valentina Cipriani; Italy
Team foil	Russia; Yana Alborova; Anastasiia Ivanova; Diana Yakovleva; Adelina Zagidullina	France; Gaëlle Gebet; Julie Huin; Chloé Jubenot; Jéromine Mpah-Njanga	Italy; Chiara Cini; Valentina Cipriani; Carolina Erba; Alice Volpi
Individual sabre	Angelika Wątor; Poland	Sevil Bunyatova; Azerbaijan	Sevinc Bunyatova; Azerbaijan Margaux Rifkiss; France
Team sabre	Ukraine; Olha Kharlan; Alina Komashchuk; Olena Kravatska; Olha Zhovnir	Italy; Sofia Ciaraglia; Martina Criscio; Rebecca Gargano; Caterina Navarria	Russia; Viktoriya Kovaleva; Yana Obvintseva; Mariya Ridel; Tatiana Sukhova

== Medal table ==
* Host nation (Azerbaijan)

Rank	Nation	Gold	Silver	Bronze	Total
1	Italy	3	2	7	12
2	Romania	2	2	1	5
3	France	2	1	3	6
4	Ukraine	2	0	0	2
5	Russia	1	5	3	9
6	Great Britain	1	0	0	1
6	Poland	1	0	0	1
8	Azerbaijan*	0	1	1	2
8	Estonia	0	1	1	2
10	Germany	0	0	1	1
10	Norway	0	0	1	1
Totals (11 entries)		12	12	18	42
