= Fencing at the 2020 Summer Olympics =

Fencing at the Games of the XXXII Olympiad
- Venue: Makuhari Messe
- Dates: 24 July – 1 August 2021
- No. of events: 12
- Competitors: 261 from 42 nations

The fencing competitions at the 2020 Summer Olympics in Tokyo featured 12 events, the first time that both team and individual events have been held in all three weapons for both men and women.

Originally scheduled for 25 July to 2 August 2020, the games were postponed due to the COVID-19 pandemic and rescheduled to 24 July to 1 August 2021.

== Qualification ==
There were 200 quota spots for fencing at the 2020 Summer Olympics. Qualification were primarily based on the Fédération Internationale d'Escrime (FIE) Official Ranking as of 4 April 2020, with further individual places available at 4 zonal qualifying tournaments.

For the team events, 8 teams qualify in each event. Each team must be composed of at least 3 fencers. The top 4 ranked teams qualify. The next-best ranked team from each zone (Africa, the Americas, Europe, and Asia-Oceania) will qualify as long as it is ranked in the top 16. If a zone does not have any teams ranked between 5th and 16th, the best-placed team not already qualified will be selected regardless of zone.

For individual events, the 3 fencers from the team event qualify for individual competition automatically. Six more places will be awarded based on the rankings (ignoring fencers from countries with team qualifications, and considering only the top fencer from each country): the top 2 fencers from each of Europe and Asia-Oceania, and the top 1 fencer from each of Americas and Africa, qualify. 4 more places (1 per zone) will be awarded through zone qualifying tournaments; only countries without a qualified fencer in an event will be eligible to participate in these zone qualifying tournaments.

The host country, Japan, is guaranteed a minimum of 8 quota spots.

== Participating nations ==
261 athletes from 42 nations competed at the Olympics in the fencing event.

- Algeria (4)
- Argentina (1)
- Azerbaijan (1)
- Brazil (2)
- Canada (11)
- Chile (1)
- China (14)
- Colombia (1)
- Czech Republic (2)
- Egypt (14)
- Estonia (4)
- France (18)
- Georgia (1)
- Germany (9)
- Great Britain (1)
- Greece (1)
- Hong Kong (8)
- Hungary (13)
- India (1)
- Iran (4)
- Italy (24)
- Japan (21) Hosts
- Kazakhstan (1)
- Kyrgyzstan (1)
- Mexico (1)
- Morocco (1)
- Netherlands (1)
- Peru (1)
- Poland (5)
- ROC (26)
- Romania (2)
- Senegal (1)
- Singapore (2)
- South Korea (18)
- Spain (1)
- Switzerland (4)
- Tunisia (8)
- Turkey (1)
- Ukraine (6)
- United States (23)
- Uzbekistan (3)
- Venezuela (2)

== Schedule ==
P	Preliminaries	QF	Quarter-Finals	SF	Semi-Finals	F	Finals	M	Morning	E	Evening

Scheduled fencing events by date
Event	24 July				25 July				26 July				27 July				28 July				29 July				30 July				31 July				1 August			
Event	M		E		M		E		M				M		E		M		E		M		E		M		E		M		E		M			
Men's Individual épée					P	QF	SF	F																												
Men's team épée																									P	QF	SF	F								
Men's Individual foil									P	QF	SF	F																								
Men's team foil																																	P	QF	SF	F
Men's Individual sabre	P	QF	SF	F																																
Men's team sabre																	P	QF	SF	F																
Women's Individual épée	P	QF	SF	F																																
Women's team épée													P	QF	SF	F																				
Women's Individual foil					P	QF	SF	F																												
Women's team foil																					P	QF	SF	F												
Women's Individual sabre									P	QF	SF	F																								
Women's team sabre																													P	QF	SF	F				

Sources: Olympian Database, Olympics.com

== Medal summary ==
=== Medal table ===
* Host nation (Japan)

Rank	NOC	Gold	Silver	Bronze	Total
1	ROC	3	4	1	8
2	France	2	2	1	5
3	South Korea	1	1	3	5
4	Hungary	1	1	1	3
5	Estonia	1	0	1	2
5	United States	1	0	1	2
7	China	1	0	0	1
7	Hong Kong	1	0	0	1
7	Japan*	1	0	0	1
10	Italy	0	3	2	5
11	Romania	0	1	0	1
12	Czech Republic	0	0	1	1
12	Ukraine	0	0	1	1
Totals (13 entries)		12	12	12	36

=== Medalists ===
==== Men's ====
Event	Gold	Silver	Bronze
Individual épée	Romain Cannone; France	Gergely Siklósi; Hungary	Ihor Reizlin; Ukraine
Team épée	Japan; Koki Kano; Kazuyasu Minobe; Masaru Yamada; Satoru Uyama	ROC; Sergey Bida; Sergey Khodos; Pavel Sukhov; Nikita Glazkov	South Korea; Park Sang-young; Ma Se-geon; Song Jae-ho; Kweon Young-jun
Individual foil	Cheung Ka-long; Hong Kong	Daniele Garozzo; Italy	Alexander Choupenitch; Czech Republic
Team foil	France; Enzo Lefort; Erwann Le Péchoux; Julien Mertine; Maxime Pauty	ROC; Anton Borodachev; Kirill Borodachev; Vladislav Mylnikov; Timur Safin	United States; Race Imboden; Nick Itkin; Alexander Massialas; Gerek Meinhardt
Individual sabre	Áron Szilágyi; Hungary	Luigi Samele; Italy	Kim Jung-hwan; South Korea
Team sabre	South Korea; Oh Sang-uk; Kim Jun-ho; Kim Jung-hwan; Gu Bon-gil	Italy; Luca Curatoli; Luigi Samele; Enrico Berrè; Aldo Montano	Hungary; Áron Szilágyi; András Szatmári; Tamás Decsi; Csanád Gémesi

Sources: Olympics.com

==== Women's ====
Event	Gold	Silver	Bronze
Individual épée	Sun Yiwen; China	Ana Maria Popescu; Romania	Katrina Lehis; Estonia
Team épée	Estonia; Julia Beljajeva; Irina Embrich; Erika Kirpu; Katrina Lehis	South Korea; Choi In-jeong; Kang Young-mi; Lee Hye-in; Song Se-ra	Italy; Rossella Fiamingo; Federica Isola; Mara Navarria; Alberta Santuccio
Individual foil	Lee Kiefer; United States	Inna Deriglazova; ROC	Larisa Korobeynikova; ROC
Team foil	ROC; Inna Deriglazova; Larisa Korobeynikova; Marta Martyanova; Adelina Zagidullina	France; Anita Blaze; Astrid Guyart; Pauline Ranvier; Ysaora Thibus	Italy; Martina Batini; Erica Cipressa; Arianna Errigo; Alice Volpi
Individual sabre	Sofia Pozdniakova; ROC	Sofya Velikaya; ROC	Manon Brunet; France
Team sabre	ROC; Olga Nikitina; Sofia Pozdniakova; Sofya Velikaya	France; Sara Balzer; Cécilia Berder; Manon Brunet; Charlotte Lembach	South Korea; Kim Ji-yeon; Yoon Ji-su; Seo Ji-yeon; Choi Soo-yeon

Sources: Olympics.com

== See also ==
- Fencing at the 2018 Asian Games
- Fencing at the 2018 Summer Youth Olympics
- Fencing at the 2019 African Games
- Fencing at the 2019 Pan American Games
- Wheelchair fencing at the 2020 Summer Paralympics
