= Romania at the 2015 European Games =

- IOC code: ROU
- NOC: Romanian Olympic and Sports Committee
- Website: www.cosr.ro

in Baku, Azerbaijan 12 – 28 June 2015
- Competitors: 147 in 22 sports
- Flag bearer: Alin Moldoveanu
- Medals Ranked 18th: Gold 3 Silver 5 Bronze 4 Total 12

European Games appearances (overview)
- 2015; 2019; 2023; 2027

Romania participated in the 2015 European Games, in Baku, Azerbaijan from 12 to 28 June 2015.

== Medalists ==
Medal	Name	Sport	Event	Date
Gold	Ana Maria Brânză	Fencing	Women's épée	23 June
Gold	Andreea Chițu	Judo	Women's 52 kg	25 June
Gold	Ana Maria Brânză; Simona Gherman; Simona Pop; Amalia Tătăran	Fencing	Women's team épée	26 June
Silver	Roxana Borha; Elena Meroniac	Canoe sprint	Women's K2-500m	16 June
Silver	Andreea Iridon	Gymnastics	Balance beam	20 June
Silver	Tiberiu Dolniceanu	Fencing	Men's sabre	23 June
Silver	Lavinia Panaete; Bianca Gorgovan; Dacian Barna; Daniel Bocser; Lucian Savulescu	Gymnastics	Mixed aerobic groups	21 June
Silver	Alin Badea; Mădălin Bucur; Tiberiu Dolniceanu; Iulian Teodosiu	Fencing	Men's sabre	26 June
Bronze	Marius Berbecar	Gymnastics	Parallel bars	20 June
Bronze	Andreea Iridon	Gymnastics	Uneven bars	20 June
Bronze	Daniela Hondiu	Sambo	Women's 60 kg	22 June
Bronze	Simona Gherman	Fencing	Women's épée	23 June

Updated to 25 June 2015 at 19:30 (GMT+3).

== Archery ==
Athlete	Event	Ranking round		Round of 64	Round of 32	Round of 16	Quarterfinals	Semifinals	Final / BM	
Athlete	Event	Score	Seed	Opposition Score	Opposition Score	Opposition Score	Opposition Score	Opposition Score	Opposition Score	Rank
Daniel Ciornei	Men's individual	654	31	Weiss (Denmark); L 0–6	Did not advance					33
Simona Bancila	Women's individual	629	31	Senyuk (Azerbaijan); L 5–6	Did not advance					33
Simona Bancila; Daniel Ciornei	Mixed team	1283	14	—		Georgia (Georgia (country)); L 3–5	Did not advance			9

== Fencing ==
Eleven Romanian fencers qualified in five out of six individual events. Accompanying coaches are Mihai Covaliu for sabre, Petre Ducu for foil and Gheorghe Epurescu for épée.

Men

Fencer	Event	T32	T16	Quarter-finals	Semi-finals	Final/Small final	
Fencer	Event	Opponent Score	Opponent Score	Opponent Score	Opponent Score	Opponent Score	Rank
Radu Dărăban	Men's foil						
Alin Badea	Men's sabre	Bence Gémesi (HUN); W 15–9	Richard Hübers (GER); W 15–12	Andriy Yagodka (UKR); L 8–15	Did not advance		
Mădălin Bucur	Men's sabre	James Honeybone (GBR); L 6–15	Did not advance				
Tiberiu Dolniceanu	Men's sabre	Azar Taghiyev (AZE); W 15–5	James Honeybone (GBR); W 15–10	Boris Savich (RUS); W 15–10	Luigi Miracco (ITA); W 15–11	Andriy Yagodka (UKR); L 10–115	2nd place, silver medalist(s)
Iulian Teodosiu	Men's sabre	Robin Schrödter (GER); W 15–12	Aliaksandr Buikevich (BLR); W 15–11	Luigi Miracco (ITA); L 10–15	Did not advance		
Alin Badea; Mădălin Bucur; Tiberiu Dolniceanu; Iulian Teodosiu	Men's team sabre						

Women

Fencer	Event	T32	T16	Quarter-finals	Semi-finals	Final/Small final	
Fencer	Event	Opponent Score	Opponent Score	Opponent Score	Opponent Score	Opponent Score	Rank
Ana Boldor	Women's foil						
Ana Maria Brânză	Women's épée	bye	Katrina Lehis (EST); W 15–12	Catharina Kock (FIN); W 15–4	Erika Kirpu (EST); W 12–11	Yana Zvereva (RUS); W 15–11	1st place, gold medalist(s)
Simona Gherman	Women's épée	Avital Marinuk (ISR); W 15–11	Olga Kochneva (RUS); W 15–10	Giulia Rizzi (ITA); W 15–10	Yana Zvereva (RUS); L 8–15	Did not advance	3rd place, bronze medalist(s)
Simona Pop	Women's épée	Eliminated at the pool stage					
Amalia Tătăran	Women's épée	Corinna Lawrence (GBR); L 15–10	Did not advance				
Ana Maria Brânză; Simona Gherman; Simona Pop; Amalia Tătăran	Women's team épée						
Bianca Pascu	Women's sabre						

== Gymnastics ==
=== Aerobic ===
Romania has a total of six athletes after the performance at the 2013 Aerobic Gymnastics European Championships. One gymnast from pairs must compete in the group making the total athletes to 6.

- Pairs – 1 pair of 2 athletes
- Groups – 1 team of 5 athletes

=== Artistic ===
- Women's – 3 quota places

=== Rhythmic ===
Romania has qualified one athlete after the performance at the 2013 Rhythmic Gymnastics European Championships.

- Individual – 1 quota place

== Triathlon ==
- Men's – Ciprian Bălănescu
- Women's – Antoanela Manac
