= Zurkhaneh sports at the 2017 Islamic Solidarity Games =

Zurkhaneh at the 2017 Islamic Solidarity Games
- Venue: Crystal Hall
- Dates: 20–21 May 2017

Zurkhaneh at the 2017 Islamic Solidarity Games was held in Crystal Hall, Baku, Azerbaijan from 20 May to 21 May 2017.

== Medal table ==
Rank	Nation	Gold	Silver	Bronze	Total
1	Iran (IRI)	6	1	0	7
2	Azerbaijan (AZE)	1	3	3	7
3	Iraq (IRQ)	0	3	1	4
4	Afghanistan (AFG)	0	0	5	5
5	Tajikistan (TJK)	0	0	4	4
6	Pakistan (PAK)	0	0	1	1
Totals (6 entries)		7	7	14	28

== Medalists ==
Event	Gold	Silver	Bronze
Charkh chamani	Ali Jalijoo; Iran	Orkhan Khanlarov; Azerbaijan	Mustafa Nooristani; Afghanistan
Charkh chamani	Ali Jalijoo; Iran	Orkhan Khanlarov; Azerbaijan	Abduali Nazaralii; Tajikistan
Charkh teez	Ali Jalijoo; Iran	Jaber Sabri; Iraq	Orkhan Khanlarov; Azerbaijan
Charkh teez	Ali Jalijoo; Iran	Jaber Sabri; Iraq	Mushtaq Hassan Sharifi; Afghanistan
Kabbadeh	Mohsen Golestanizadeh; Iran	Jaber Sabri; Iraq	Mammadi Salamov; Azerbaijan
Kabbadeh	Mohsen Golestanizadeh; Iran	Jaber Sabri; Iraq	Ismoil Sangov; Tajikistan
Meel bazi	Pejman Sokounati; Iran	Khayyam Orujov; Azerbaijan	Ahmad Shakib Atahi; Afghanistan
Meel bazi	Pejman Sokounati; Iran	Khayyam Orujov; Azerbaijan	Arbab Sardar Ahmad Khan; Pakistan
Meel sangin	Mostafa Mofid; Iran	Ridha Ghalib; Iraq	Khayyam Orujov; Azerbaijan
Meel sangin	Mostafa Mofid; Iran	Ridha Ghalib; Iraq	Navruz Arabov; Tajikistan
Sang	Rufat Gulaliyev; Azerbaijan	Mobin Zibalagha; Iran	Navruz Arabov; Tajikistan
Sang	Rufat Gulaliyev; Azerbaijan	Mobin Zibalagha; Iran	Hakimullah Bigzada; Afghanistan
Team	Iran; Himan Mirzaei; Mobin Zibalagha; Mohsen Golestanizadeh; Pejman Sokounati; Ali Jalijoo	Azerbaijan; Tural Aliyev; Mammadli Salamov; Khayyam Orujov; Rufat Gulaliyev; Orkhan Khanlarov	Afghanistan; Hakimullah Bigzada; Mustafa Nooristani; Ahmad Shakib Atahi; Mushtaq Hassan Sharifi; Ahmad Samim Niazy
Team	Iran; Himan Mirzaei; Mobin Zibalagha; Mohsen Golestanizadeh; Pejman Sokounati; Ali Jalijoo	Azerbaijan; Tural Aliyev; Mammadli Salamov; Khayyam Orujov; Rufat Gulaliyev; Orkhan Khanlarov	Iraq; Ammar Ibrahim; Zaman Abd-Mohsin; Haidar Abdul-Ameer; Jaber Sabri; Hussein Safaa
