= Women's team épée at the 2017 World Fencing Championships =

- Venue: Arena Leipzig
- Location: Leipzig, Germany
- Dates: 26 July

Medalists
gold medal	Julia Beljajeva; Irina Embrich; Erika Kirpu; Kristina Kuusk	Estonia
silver medal	Sun Yiwen; Sun Yujie; Xu Chengzi; Zhu Mingye	China
bronze medal	Renata Knapik-Miazga; Ewa Nelip; Magdalena Piekarska; Barbara Rutz	Poland

The women's team épée event of the 2017 World Fencing Championships was held on 26 July 2017.

== Draw ==
=== Championship bracket ===
Round of 32
Spain	45
Kazakhstan	37
Italy	45
Costa Rica	14
Argentina	45
Japan	39
Canada	30
Israel	45
Venezuela	30
Hungary	41
Poland	45
Finland	18
Singapore	11
Germany	45
Hong Kong	38
Sweden	34

Round of 16
China	43
Spain	30
Italy	26
United States	37
South Korea	45
Argentina	26
Israel	32
France	45
Russia	33
Hungary	32
Poland	37
Ukraine	31
Romania	37
Germany	45
Hong Kong	17
Estonia	45

Quarterfinals
China	38
United States	37
South Korea	40
France	38
Russia	41
Poland	45
Germany	11
Estonia	12

Semifinals
China	40
South Korea	32
Poland	27
Estonia	37

Final
China	33
Estonia	45
Third place
South Korea	28
Poland	33

=== 5–8th place bracket ===
5–8th place semifinals
United States	44
France	45
Russia	34
Germany	40

Fifth place
France	38
Germany	45
Seventh place
United States	45
Russia	38

=== 9–16th place bracket ===
9–16th place quarterfinals
Spain	33
Italy	45
Argentina	38
Israel	45
Hungary	35
Ukraine	45
Romania	41
Hong Kong	45

9–12th place semifinals
Italy	43
Israel	25
Ukraine	42
Hong Kong	37

Ninth place
Italy	45
Ukraine	34
Eleventh place
Israel	45
Hong Kong	36

=== 13–16th place bracket ===
13–16th place semifinals
Spain	45
Argentina	36
Hungary	45
Romania	29

13th place
Spain	27
Hungary	45
15th place
Argentina	36
Romania	45

== Final ranking ==
Rank	Team
Gold medal	Estonia
Silver medal	China
Bronze medal	Poland
4	South Korea
5	Germany
6	France
7	United States
8	Russia
9	Italy
10	Ukraine
11	Israel
12	Hong Kong
13	Hungary
14	Spain
15	Romania
16	Argentina
17	Japan
18	Canada
19	Kazakhstan
20	Sweden
21	Venezuela
22	Finland
23	Singapore
24	Costa Rica
