= Estonian Young Athlete of the Year =

Estonian award

The Estonian Young Athlete of the Year (Estonian: Aasta noorsportlane) is chosen annually each December, since 2006. The winner is the sportsperson who is voted by a group of sports journalists and sports associations, to have achieved the most that year.

== List of award winners ==
Year	Estonian Young Athlete of the Year	
2006	Heiki Nabi	Wrestling
2007	Deniss Karpak	Sailing
2008	Kaire Leibak	Triple jump
2009	Liane Pintsaar	Long jump/Triple jump
2010	Kaisa Pajusalu	Rowing
2011	Grit Šadeiko	Heptathlon
2012	Anett Kontaveit	Tennis
2013	Julia Beljajeva	Fencing
2014	Katrina Lehis	Fencing
2015	Anett Kontaveit (2)	Tennis
2016	Kelly Sildaru	Freestyle skiing
2017	Kelly Sildaru (2)	Freestyle skiing
2018	Kelly Sildaru (3)	Freestyle skiing
2019	Kelly Sildaru (4)	Freestyle skiing
2020	Kelly Sildaru (5)	Freestyle skiing
2021	Eneli Jefimova	Swimming
2022	Karmen Bruus	High jump
2023	Eneli Jefimova	Swimming
2024	Eneli Jefimova	Swimming

== See also ==
- Estonian Athlete of the Year
- Estonian Coach of the Year
- Estonian Sports Team of the Year
