= Liane Pintsaar =

Estonian athletics competitor

Liane Pintsaar (born 17 March 1990) is an Estonian athletics competitor.

She was born in Tartu. She has studied at Tartu University's Institute of Physical Education.

She started her athletics exercising in 2002, coached by Margit Aidla. She has won three gold medals at Estonian Championships: 2009 in long jump and triple jump, and 2013 in triple jump. 2007-2013 she was a member of Estonian national athletics team.

In 2009, she was named the Estonian Young Athlete of the Year.
