= Women's team épée at the 2014 World Fencing Championships =

The Women's team épée event of the 2014 World Fencing Championships was held from 22–23 July 2014.

== Medalists ==
| Gold | Russia; Tatyana Gudkova; Violetta Kolobova; Lyubov Shutova; Yana Zvereva |
| Silver | Estonia; Julia Beljajeva; Irina Embrich; Erika Kirpu; Kristina Kuusk |
| Bronze | Italy; Bianca Del Carretto; Rossella Fiamingo; Francesca Quondamcarlo; Mara Navarria |

== Draw ==
=== Finals ===
| Final |
| Russia | 40 |
| Estonia | 29 |

| Third place |
| Hungary | 37 |
| Italy | 45 |

=== Top half ===
Round of 32
Hong Kong | 25
Chinese Taipei | 21
South Korea | 45
Finland | 22
Australia | 34
France | 45
United States | 45
Mongolia | 9
South Africa | 27
Poland | 45
Switzerland
Brazil
Panama
Hungary

Round of 16
Russia | 45
Hong Kong | 28
South Korea | 27
France | 25
United States | 45
Poland | 35
Brazil | 28
Hungary | 45

Quarterfinals
Russia | 30
South Korea | 29
United States | 31
Hungary | 45

Semifinals
Russia | 31
Hungary | 24

=== Bottom half ===
Round of 32
Japan | 26
Germany | 32
Ukraine | 45
Kazakhstan | 31
Argentina | 28
Italy | 45
Estonia | 43
Israel | 26
Mexico | 22
Sweden | 45
Venezuela | 45
Canada | 34

Round of 16
Romania | 25
Germany | 16
Ukraine | 36
Italy | 45
Estonia | 45
Sweden | 24
Venezuela | 16
China | 45

Quarterfinals
Romania | 32
Italy | 41
Estonia | 31
China | 30

Semifinals
Italy | 32
Estonia | 42

=== Placement rounds ===
==== 5–8th place ====
5–8th place semifinals
South Korea | 29
United States | 31
Romania | 43
China | 42

5th place
United States | 40
Romania | 45
7th place
South Korea | 45
China | 39

==== 9–16th place ====
9–16th place quarterfinals
Hong Kong | 32
France | 45
Poland | 45
Brazil | 29
Germany | 22
Ukraine | 27
Sweden | 44
Venezuela | 42

9–12th place semifinals
France | 45
Poland | 41
Ukraine | 45
Sweden | 35

9th place
France | 33
Ukraine | 45
11th place
Poland | 45
Sweden | 42

==== 13–16th place ====
13–16th place semifinals
Hong Kong | 42
Brazil | 45
Germany | 31
Venezuela | 28

13th place
Brazil | 40
Germany | 45
15th place
Hong Kong | 44
Venezuela | 34

== Final classification ==
| Rank | Nation |
|---|---|
| 1st place, gold medalist(s) | Russia |
| 2nd place, silver medalist(s) | Estonia |
| 3rd place, bronze medalist(s) | Italy |
| 4 | Hungary |
| 5 | Romania |
| 6 | United States |
| 7 | South Korea |
| 8 | China |
| 9 | Ukraine |
| 10 | France |
| 11 | Poland |
| 12 | Sweden |
| 13 | Germany |
| 14 | Brazil |
| 15 | Hong Kong |
| 16 | Venezuela |
| 17 | Switzerland |
| 18 | Chinese Taipei |
| 19 | Canada |
| 20 | Japan |
| 21 | South Africa |
| 22 | Kazakhstan |
| 23 | Mexico |
| 24 | Finland |
| 25 | Australia |
| 26 | Israel |
| 27 | Argentina |
| 28 | Mongolia |
