= Veera Rumjantseva =

Estonian sport shooter

Veera Rumjantseva (born 30 August 1987) is an Estonian sport shooter.

She was born in Narva. She is studied at Tallinn University of Technology.

She began her sport shooting career in 2002, coached by Svetlana Nemtsova. She is competed at ISSF World Shooting Championships. She is multiple-times Estonian champion. Since 2005 she is a member of Estonian national sport shooting team.
