= Kaidi Kivioja =

Estonian triathlete (born 1993)

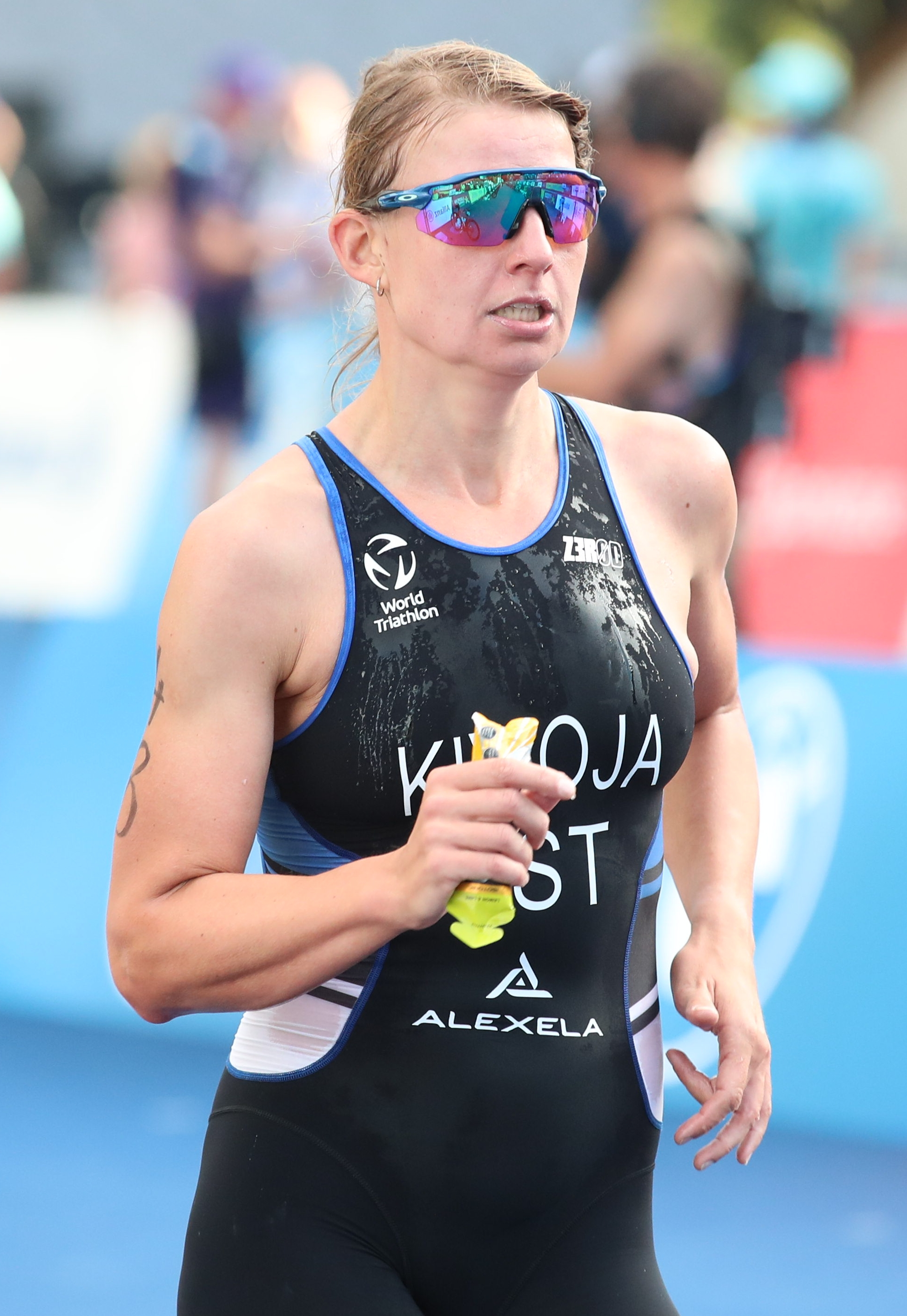

Personal information
- Born: 23 February 1993 (age 32); Rakvere, Estonia

Sport
- Sport: Triathlon

Kaidi Kivioja (born 23 February 1993) is an Estonian triathlete. She competed in the women's event at the 2016 Summer Olympics held in Rio de Janeiro, Brazil. She also competed in the women's event at the 2020 Summer Olympics held in Tokyo, Japan.

In 2015, she competed in the women's event at the European Games held in Baku, Azerbaijan.
