= Amalia Tătăran =

Romanian fencer (born 1994)

Personal information
- Full name: Amalia Alexandra Tătăran
- Nickname: Ama
- Born: 15 July 1994 (age 31) Satu Mare, România
- Height: 1.75 m (5 ft 9 in)
- Weight: 65 kg (143 lb)

Fencing career
- Sport: Fencing
- Country: Romania
- Weapon: Épée
- Hand: Right-handed
- National coach: Dan Podeanu, Gheorghe Epurescu
- Club: CS Dinamo București
- Head coach: Petrică Ungureanu
- FIE ranking: current ranking
Medal record
Women's épée fencing
Representing Romania
European Games
Gold medal – first place	2015 Baku	Team épée
European Championships
Silver medal – second place	2013 Zagreb	Team épée
Bronze medal – third place	2017 Tbilisi	Team épée

Amalia Tătăran (born 15 July 1994 in Satu Mare) is a Romanian épée fencer, team silver medallist at the 2013 European Fencing Championships and team gold medallist at the 2015 European Games.

== Career ==
Tătăran took up fencing at the age of 9 in Satu Mare, a Romanian fencing stronghold, under the guidance of coach Francisc Csiszar. She won a bronze medal at the 2010 Cadet World Championships in Baku. She also represented Romania at the 2010 Summer Youth Olympics, finishing fifth.

In 2012, she became the youngest member of the Romanian national team. The same year she won the Romanian Cup after defeating in the final Olympic silver medallist Ana Maria Brânză. Tătăran won in 2013 a silver medal at the Junior European Championships in Budapest, followed by a team silver medal at the senior European Championships in Zagreb. For this performance she was named athlete opf the year of Satu Mare County for the third time, after 2010 and 2011. In 2013, she transferred from CS Satu Mare to CS Dinamo București.

In the 2014–15 season she won a bronze medal at the U23 European Championships in Vincenza. She was named a reserve for Romania at the 2015 European Games. In the individual event, she was eliminated in the table of 32 by Great Britain's Corinna Lawrence. In the team event, no.2 seeded Romania accessed directly the semi-finals, where they saw off Russia. They overcame Estonia in the final to earn the gold medal.
