= Ewa Trzebińska =

Polish fencer

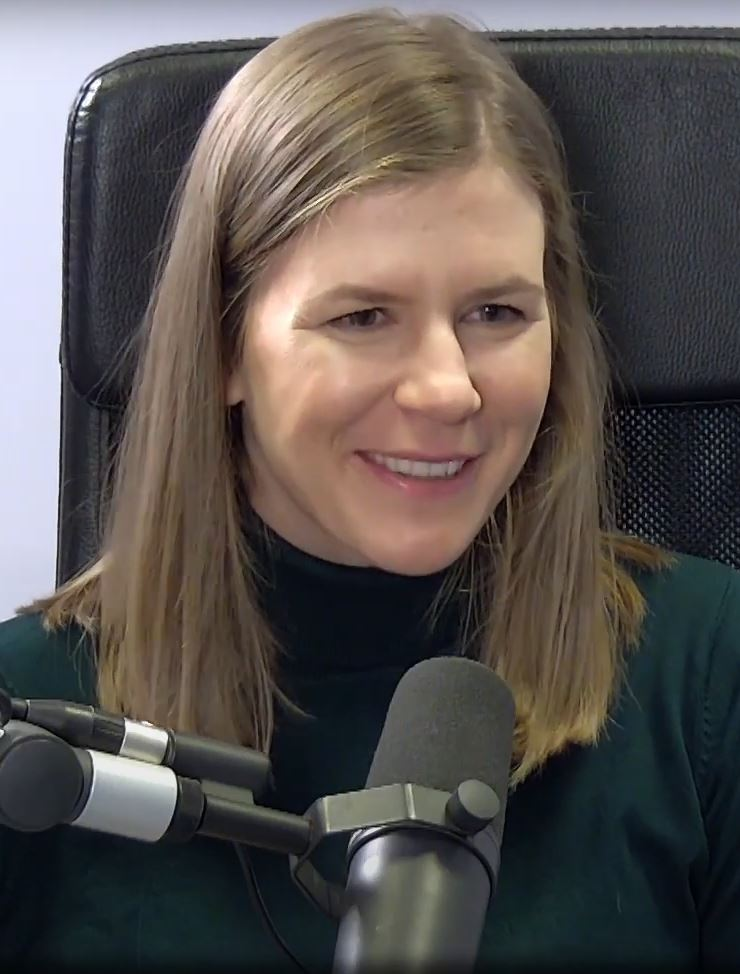

Personal information
- Born: 1 May 1989 (age 37) Katowice, Poland
- Height: 1.76 m (5 ft 9 in)
- Weight: 67 kg (148 lb)

Fencing career
- Sport: Fencing
- Country: Poland
- Weapon: Épée
- Hand: right-handed
- FIE ranking: current ranking
Medal record
Women's épée
Representing Poland
World Championships
Gold medal – first place	2023 Milan	Team
Silver medal – second place	2009 Antalya	Team
Silver medal – second place	2017 Leipzig	Individual
Bronze medal – third place	2017 Leipzig	Team
European Championships
Gold medal – first place	2010 Leipzig	Team
Gold medal – first place	2019 Düsseldorf	Team
Silver medal – second place	2018 Novi Sad	Team
Bronze medal – third place	2019 Düsseldorf	Individual
Summer Universiade
Gold medal – first place	2009 Belgrade	Individual

Ewa Trzebińska (née Nelip) is a Polish épée fencer. She earned a silver medal at the 2017 World Championships, silver medal in the 2009 World Championships and won the team gold medal at the 2010 European Fencing Championships.
