= Tatyana Andryushina =

Russian épée fencer

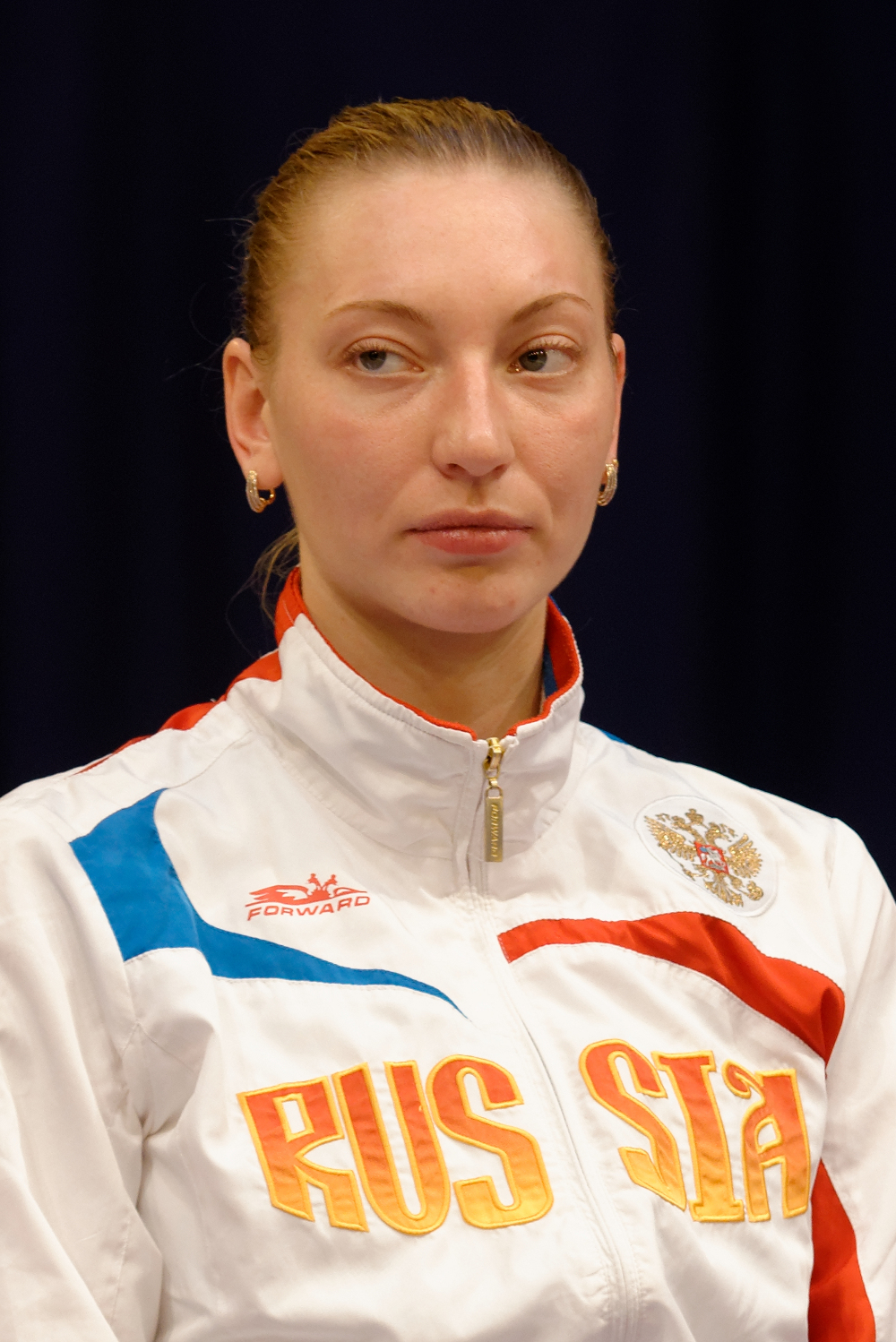
- 2013

Personal information
- Full name: Tatyana Sergeyevna Andryushina
- Born: 26 June 1990 (age 36) Voskresensk, Moscow Oblast, Russia
- Height: 1.76 m (5 ft 9 in)
- Weight: 65 kg (143 lb)

Fencing career
- Sport: Fencing
- Country: Russia
- Weapon: Épée
- Hand: Right-handed
- National coach: Aleksandr Glazunov
- Club: CSKA Moscow
- FIE ranking: ranking
Medal record
Women's fencing
Representing Russia
World Championships
| Gold medal – first place | 2013 Budapest | Team épée |
| Silver medal – second place | 2019 Budapest | Team épée |
European Championships
| Silver medal – second place | 2019 Düsseldorf | Team épée |
Summer Universiade
| Bronze medal – third place | 2011 Shenzhen | Team épée |
Military World Games
| Gold medal – first place | 2019 Wuhan | Team épée |
| Bronze medal – third place | 2019 Wuhan | Individual épée |

Tatyana Sergeyevna Andryushina (Russian: Татьяна Сергеевна Андрюшина; born 26 June 1990) is a Russian épée fencer.

She won a bronze medal in the 2013 Havana Grand Prix. The same year, she took part in the World Championships in Budapest. She was defeated in the second round by eventual bronze medallist Emese Szász of Hungary. In the team event, she won the world team title with Russia.
