= Baku Crystal Hall =

Indoor arena in Baku, Azerbaijan

- Exterior of Baku Crystal Hall
- Interactive map of Baku Crystal Hall
- Full name: Bakı Kristal Zalı
- Location: Baku, Azerbaijan
- Coordinates: 40.344°N 49.850°E
- Owner: Baku City Executive Power
- Capacity: 12,000 (seated); 27,000 (with standing room)

Construction
- Built: August 2011 - April 2012
- Opened: 7 May 2012
- Cost: $350 million
- Architect: GMP International GmbH
- Project managers: Alpine Bau Deutschland AG, Nussli Group, Basler & Hofmann AG
- Main contractors: SSF Ingenieure AG, seele austria GmbH & Co. KG

Website
- www.crystalhall.az

Baku Crystal Hall (Azerbaijani: Bakı Kristal Zalı) is an indoor arena in Baku, Azerbaijan. It is located on the coast of Baku near National Flag Square. Construction of the arena began in August 2011 and finished in April 2012—in time for it to host its first major event, the Eurovision Song Contest 2012.

== History ==
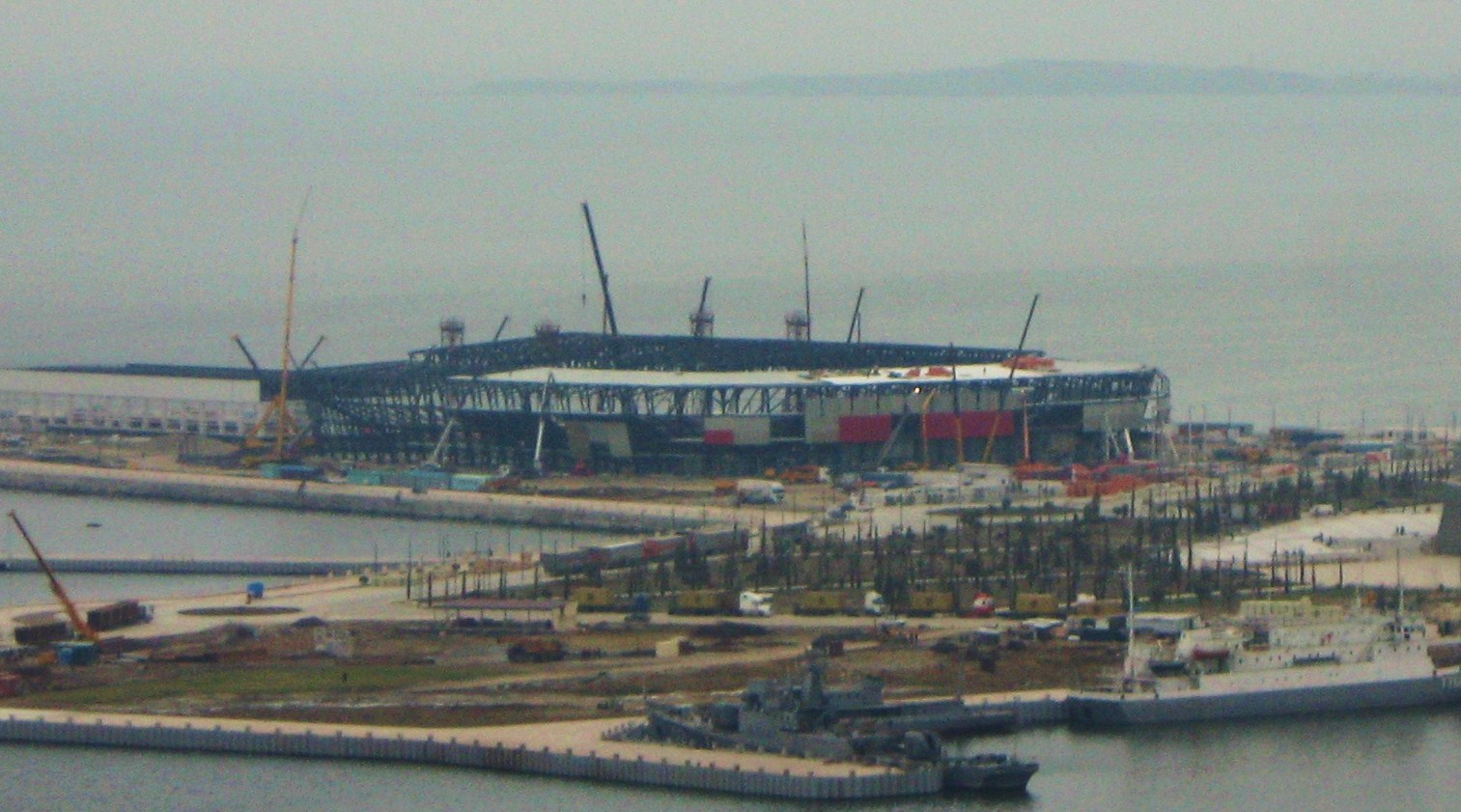
Baku Crystal Hall under construction (January 2012)

Baku Crystal Hall was built in order to host the Eurovision Song Contest 2012. On 2 August 2011, the main agreement was signed with Alpine Bau Deutschland AG to construct the venue and preparations for construction started in the area. Although the full cost of the contract was not named, the government is known to have allocated 6 million AZN for the construction of the venue. On 5 September 2011, it was announced that the venue will be able to hold 25,000 spectators. The arena also contains VIP lounges.

The construction of the arena was expected to be completed by 31 March 2012. However, there was a delay of three weeks because of weather conditions, and the building was announced to have been completed on 16 April 2012. Baku Crystal Hall was opened on 7 May 2012 by the President of Azerbaijan Ilham Aliyev and First Lady Mehriban Aliyeva.

== Structure and facilities ==
The total area of the complex is 30,958 m^{2}, while the area of the arena is 10,964 m^{2}. Its height in the middle is 24 m. The arena is lit by 12,000 LED light points with a lighting rate of 850 lux at 1 m height. The corridor around the arena is divided into two symmetrical parts with 15 entrances on each side, including 30 outside entrances. Each sector has 2 transport access points (1 on each side), 10 arena entrances (5 on each side) and 16 tribune access points (8 on each side). Along the corridor, there are 10 beverage facilities (5 in each sector), 18 catering facilities (9 in each sector), 2 first aid points (1 in each sector), 36 toilets (6 for men, 6 for women and 6 for persons with physical disabilities in each sector). The hall has 12,000 seats but can accommodate 27,000 people.

The building has a crystalline shape and illuminated façade with numerous LED lights. The LED lights were upgraded to allow different dynamic lighting scenarios that can highlight the membrane façade and create moods appropriate for different events.

== Usage ==
=== Concerts ===
Baku Crystal Hall's first major event was the 2012 Eurovision Song Contest, held at the arena from 22 to 26 May 2012. Jennifer Lopez, Shakira and Rihanna performed concerts at Baku Crystal Hall later in 2012. Local singer Aygün Kazımova had a concert on 22 September 2017. Christina Aguilera performed a sold-out concert on April 28, 2018. On 28 May 2018, a gala concert to celebrate the 100th anniversary of the establishment of the Azerbaijan Democratic Republic was held in Crystal Hall.

=== Culture ===
Baku Crystal Hall hosted 6th e-Sports World Championship held by the International e-Sports Federation in November 2014.

=== Sports ===
Baku Crystal Hall hosted boxing, karate, taekwondo, fencing and volleyball (indoor) events during the inaugural 2015 European Games. Other sporting events include boxing and volleyball at the 2017 Islamic Solidarity Games and the 2023 World Taekwondo Championships.

The arena hosted Azerbaijan's first UFC event on June 21, 2025 for UFC on ABC: Hill vs. Rountree Jr.

== Gallery ==
Daytime view of Baku Crystal Hall

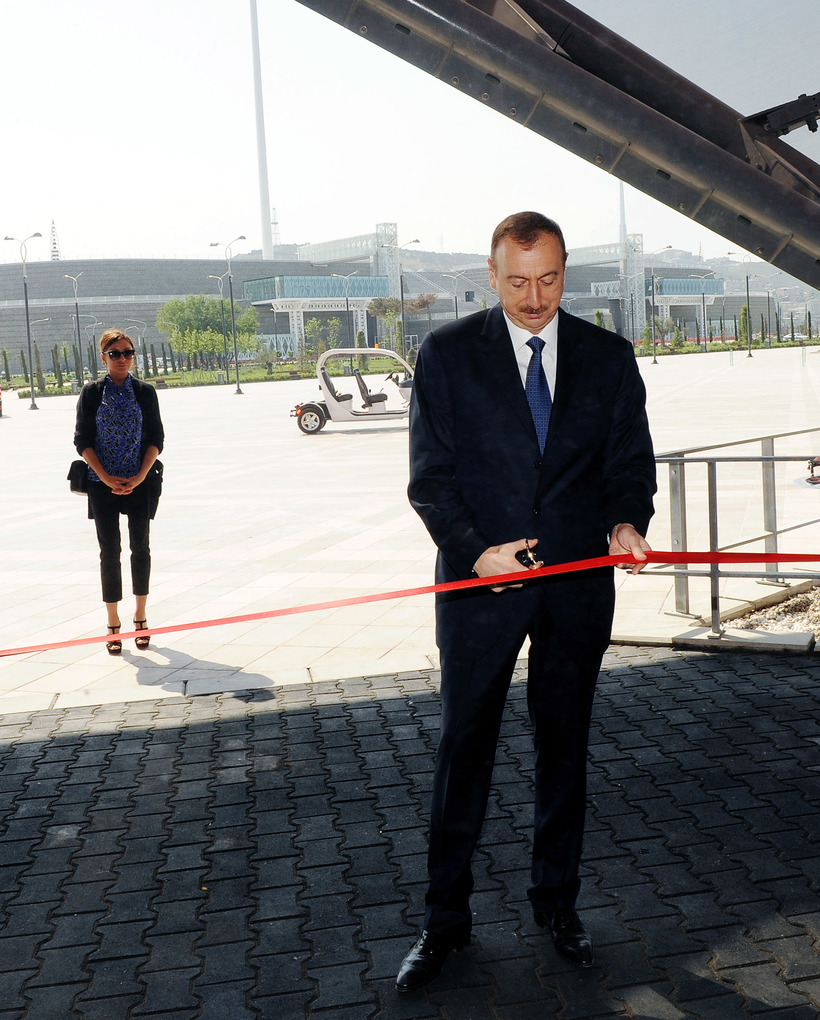
The opening of the Baku Crystal Hall

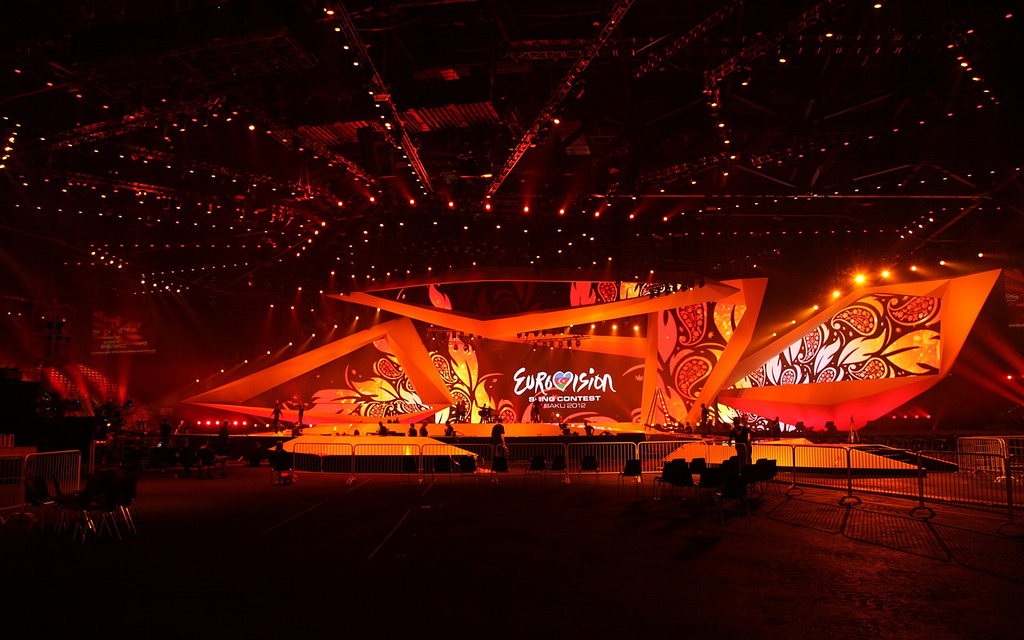
The 2012 Eurovision Song Contest was the first major event at Baku Crystal Hall

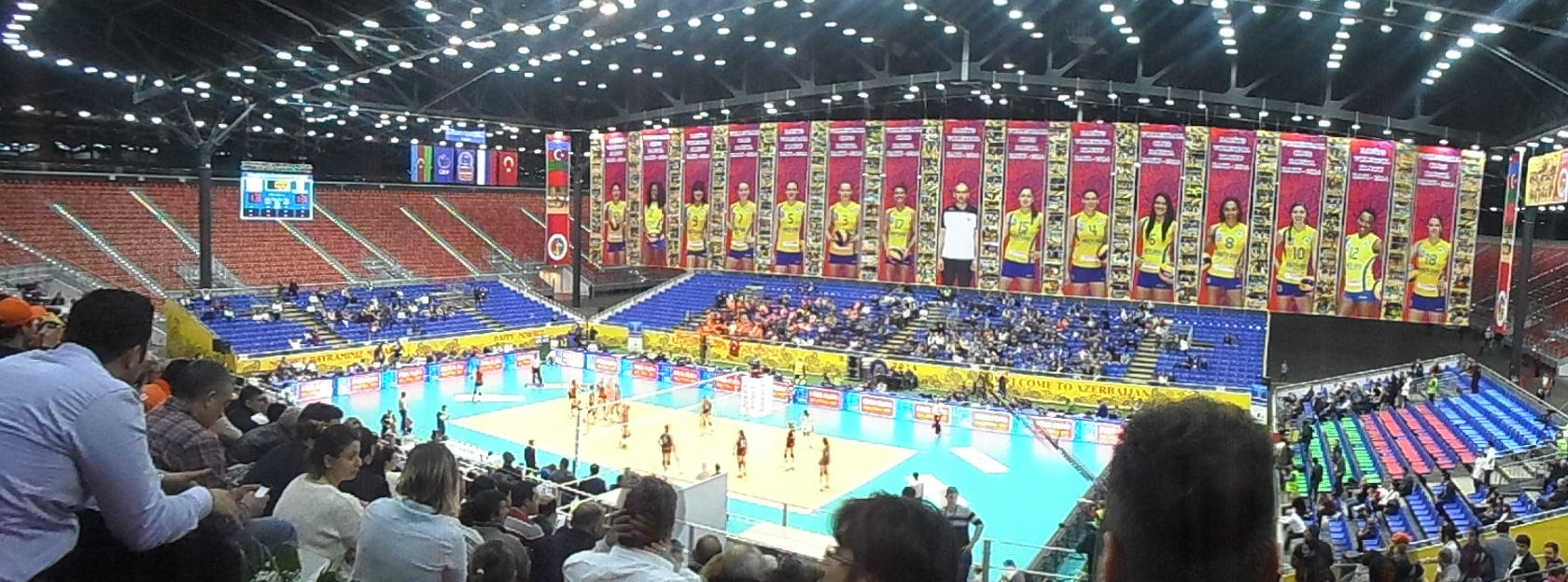
CEV Champions League 2013-2014 Final Four

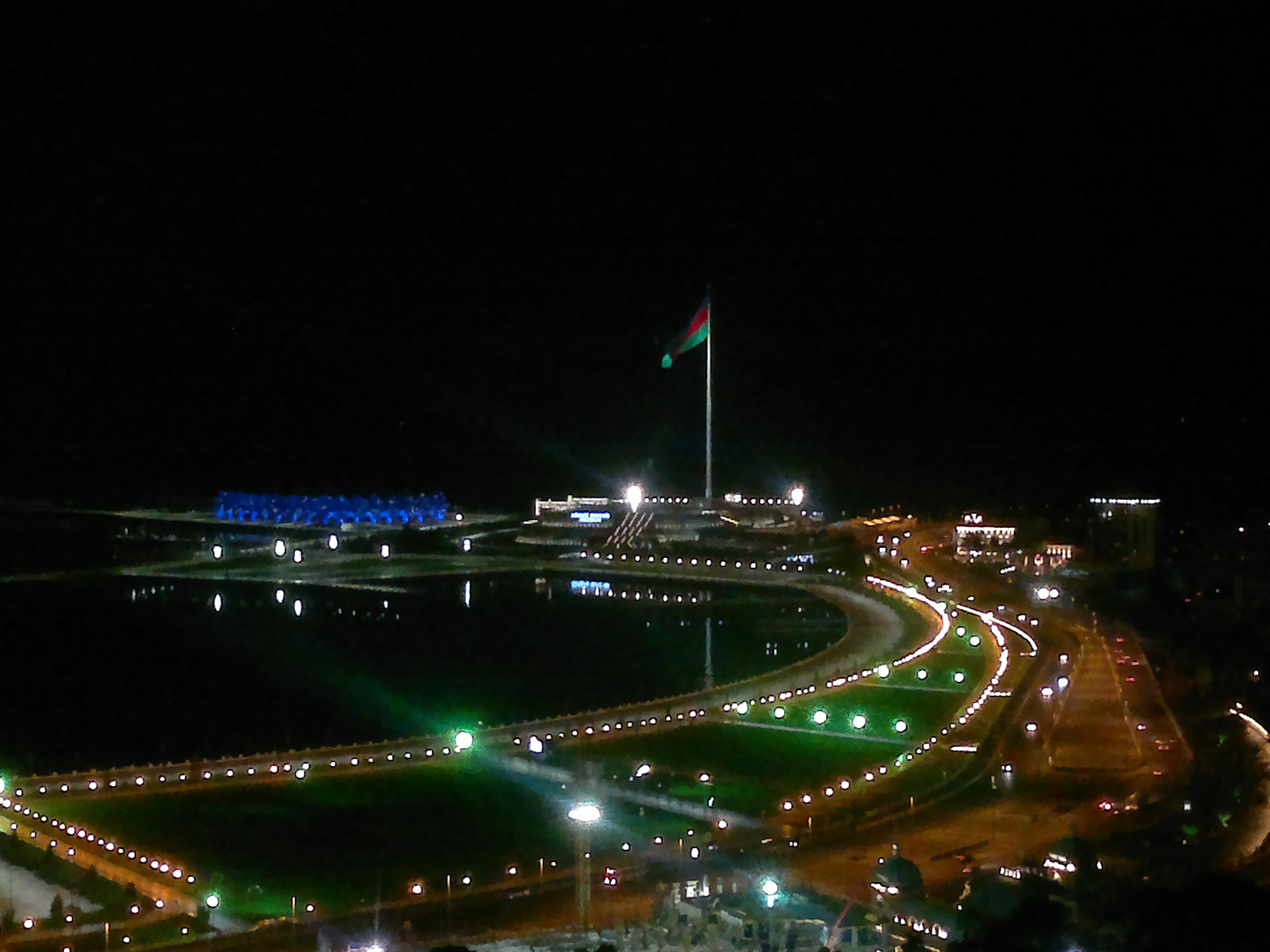
Baku at night with the Baku Crystal Hall in the background

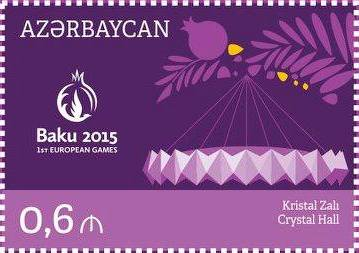
Stamp celebrating Baku Crystal Hall

Preceded by Esprit Arena; Düsseldorf	Eurovision Song Contest; Venue; 2012	Succeeded by Malmö Arena; Malmö
