= Yana Zvereva =

Russian fencer (born 1989)

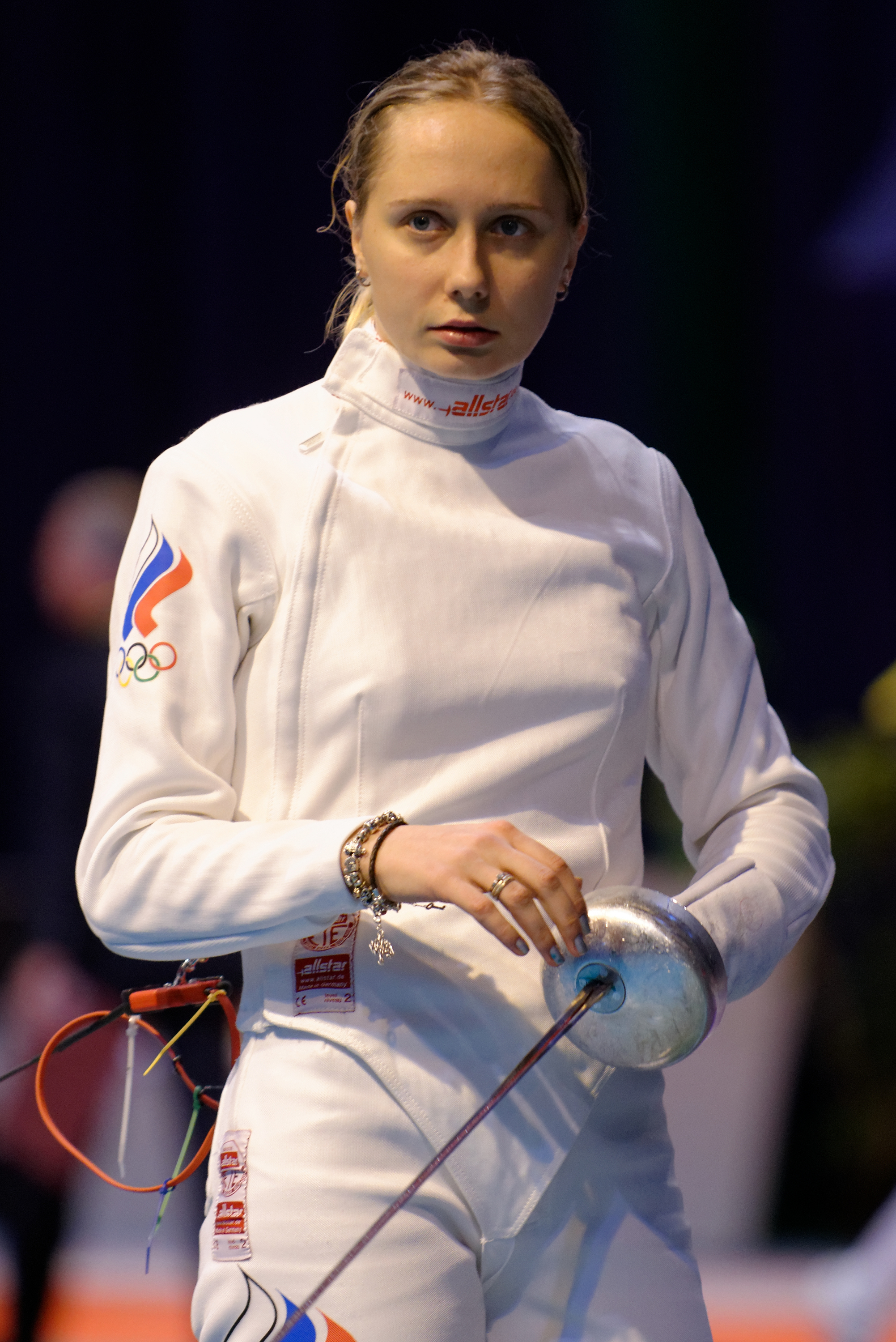
- Zvereva in 2014

Personal information
- Full name: Yana Aleksandrovna Zvereva
- Born: 6 March 1989 (age 37) Tver, Russia
- Height: 1.70 m (5 ft 7 in)
- Weight: 59 kg (130 lb)

Fencing career
- Sport: Fencing
- Country: Russia
- Weapon: Épée
- Hand: Left-handed
- National coach: Aleksandr Glazunov
- Club: Dynamo Moscow
- Head coach: Yuliya Garayeva, Tatiana Fakhrutdinova
- FIE ranking: current ranking
Medal record
Women's épée fencing
Representing Russia
World Championships
Gold medal – first place	2013 Budapest	Team épée
Gold medal – first place	2014 Kazan	Team épée
European Games
Silver medal – second place	2015 Baku	Individual épée
European Championships
Silver medal – second place	2014 Strasbourg	Team épée
Silver medal – second place	2017 Tbilisi	Team épée

Yana Aleksandrovna Zvereva (Russian: Яна Александровна Зверева; Born 6 March 1989) is a Russian épée fencer, team world champion in the 2013 World Championships at Budapest and team silver medalist in the 2014 European Championships in Strasbourg.

== Career ==
Zvereva began fencing at the age of 12. She joined the Junior Russian national team in 2005. With them, she won the 2006 Junior European Championships in Poznań and the 2009 Junior World Championships in Belfast.

In the seniors, she took the third place in the 2008 Lobnya World Cup. She made her breakthrough in the 2012–13 season: she won the 2013 Sparkassen-Cup in Leipzig and reached the quarter-finals in the individual event of the 2013 World Championships in Budapest. She also won the team gold medal with Russia.

In the 2013–14 season, she won a silver medal in the 2014 Ciudad de Barcelona. She advanced to the quarter-finals in the European Championships in Strasbourg, but was stopped by host France's Joséphine Jacques-André-Coquin. In the team event, Russia received a bye in the table of 16, then had a tight 34–33 victory over Poland. They largely prevailed over reigning European champions Estonia in the semi-final to meet Romania in the final. Zvereva fenced World No.2 Ana Maria Brânză in her last leg and gave her team a three-hit advantage, but Russia were finally defeated 38–34 and took the silver medal. At the World Championships in Kazan she was defeated by China's Qin Xue in the second round of the individual event. In the team event Russia edged out South Korea in the quarter-finals, then largely prevailed over Hungary and Estonia to win the World title for the second time in a row.

Zvereva is married to foil fencer and coach Igor Zapozdaev.
