= Olga Kochneva =

Russian fencer (born 1988)

Personal information
- Full name: Olga Aleksandrovna Kochneva
- Nationality: Russian
- Born: 29 June 1988 (age 38) Dzerzhinsk, Russia
- Height: 1.68 m (5 ft 6 in)
- Weight: 58 kg (128 lb)

Sport
- Country: Russia
- Sport: Fencing
- Event: Épée
Medal record
Women's épée fencing
Representing Russia
Olympic Games
| Bronze medal – third place | 2016 Rio de Janeiro | Team épée |

Olga Aleksandrovna Kochneva (Russian: Ольга Александровна Кочнева; born 29 June 1988), also known as Olga Lukianova (Ольга Лукьянова), is a Russian fencer. She represented her country at the 2016 Summer Olympics, where she won the bronze medal in the women's team épée event.

== Awards ==
- Honored Master of Sports of Russia.
- Awarded the Medal of the Order For Merit to the Fatherland (August 25, 2016) — for high achievements in sports at the Games XXXI Olympiad in 2016 in the city of Rio de Janeiro (Brazil), manifested the will to win and sense of purpose.
