= Corinna Lawrence =

British fencer (born 1990)

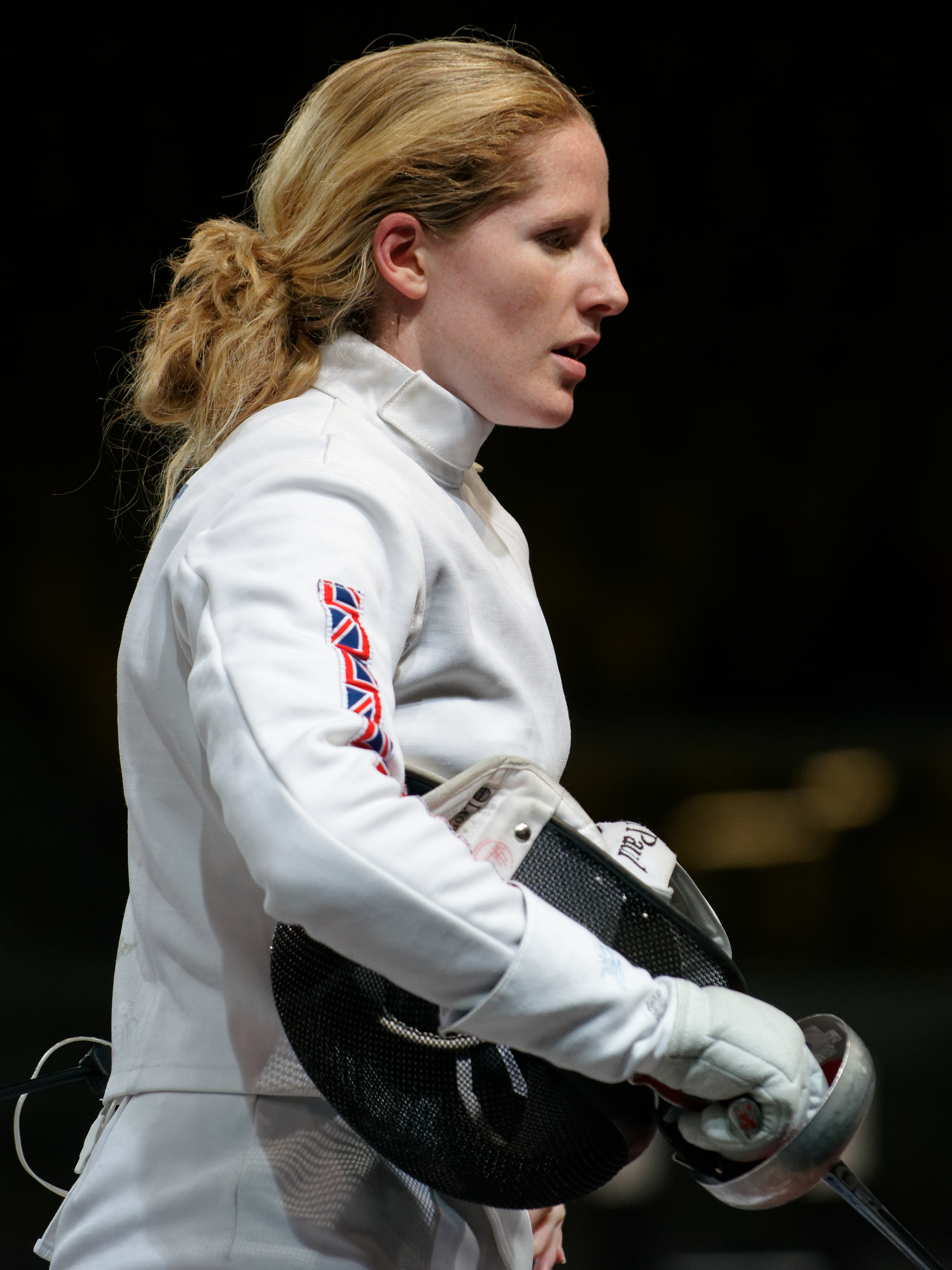
- Lawrence at the 2014 European Fencing Championships

Personal information
- Born: 25 June 1990 (age 36) Plymouth, England
- Home town: London
- Height: 1.68 m (5 ft 6 in)
- Weight: 60 kg (130 lb)

Fencing career
- Sport: Fencing
- Weapon: épée
- Hand: right-handed
- National coach: Vladimir Meshkov
- Retired: Oct 2015
- FIE ranking: Now retired but highest world ranking = 47th

Corinna Lawrence (born 25 June 1990) is a British épée fencer.

Lawrence was the British Olympic Association's 2011 Olympic Athlete of the Year for Fencing. She competed at the 2012 Summer Olympics in the Women's épée, but was defeated in the second round by reigning European champion Simona Gherman.
