= Erika Kirpu =

Estonian fencer (born 1992)

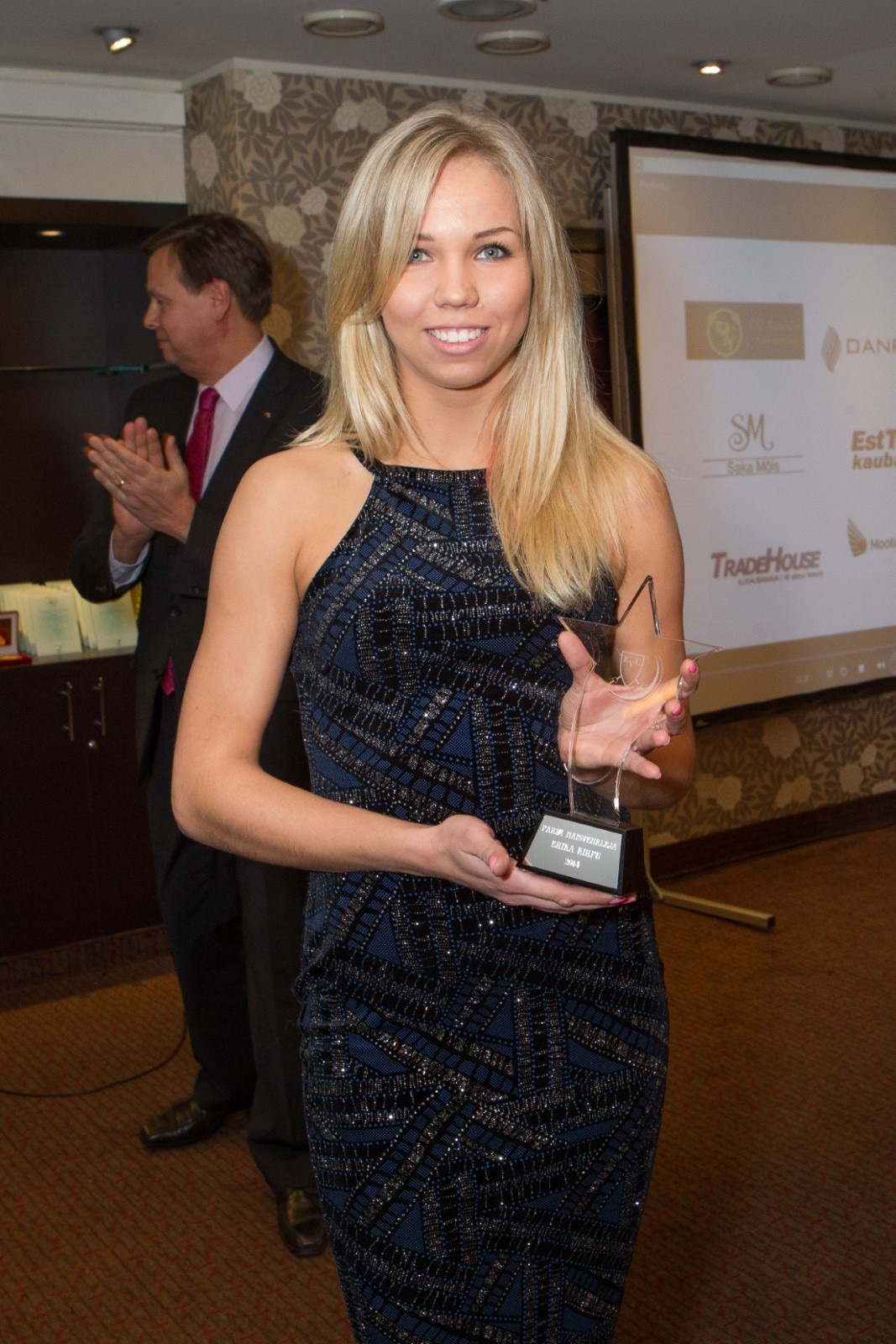
- Kirpu in 2014

Personal information
- Nationality: Estonian
- Born: 22 June 1992 (age 34) Moscow, Russia
- Height: 1.75 m (5 ft 9 in)
- Weight: 60 kg (132 lb)

Fencing career
- Sport: Fencing
- Weapon: Épée
- Hand: right-handed
- Club: Tartu Kalev
- FIE ranking: current ranking
Medal record
Olympic Games
Gold medal – first place	2020 Tokyo	Team épée
World Championships
Gold medal – first place	2017 Leipzig	Team épée
Silver medal – second place	2014 Kazan	Team épée
Bronze medal – third place	2014 Kazan	Individual
European Games
Silver medal – second place	2015 Baku	Team épée
Bronze medal – third place	2015 Baku	Individual
European Championships
Gold medal – first place	2013 Zagreb	Team épée
Gold medal – first place	2016 Toruń	Team épée
Silver medal – second place	2015 Montreux	Team épée
Bronze medal – third place	2012 Legnano	Team épée
Bronze medal – third place	2018 Novi Sad	Team épée

Erika Kirpu (born 22 June 1992) is an Estonian right-handed épée fencer.

Kirpu was born in Moscow to an Estonian father and a Russian mother of Ukrainian descent.

Kirpu is a two-time team European champion and 2017 team world champion.

A two-time Olympian, Kirpu is a 2021 team Olympic champion.

Kirpu competed in the 2016 Rio de Janeiro Olympic Games and the 2020 Tokyo Olympic Games.

She graduated from Tartu Annelinna Gümnaasium in 2010 and from the Faculty of Law of Tallinn University of Technology in 2014.

She lives in Milan, Italy with her partner and fellow épée fencer Enrico Garozzo.

== Medal record ==
=== Olympic Games ===
Year	Location	Event	Position
2021	Tokyo, Japan	Team Women's Épée	1st

=== World Championship ===
Year	Location	Event	Position
2014	Kazan, Russia	Individual Women's Épée	3rd
2014	Kazan, Russia	Team Women's Épée	2nd
2017	Leipzig, Germany	Team Women's Épée	1st

=== European Championship ===
Year	Location	Event	Position
2012	Legnano, Italy	Team Women's Épée	3rd
2013	Zagreb, Croatia	Team Women's Épée	1st
2015	Montreux, Switzerland	Team Women's Épée	2nd
2016	Toruń, Poland	Team Women's Épée	1st
2018	Novi Sad, Serbia	Team Women's Épée	3rd

=== Grand Prix ===
Date	Location	Event	Position
2012-02-25	Budapest, Hungary	Individual Women's Épée	3rd
2014-12-06	Doha, Qatar	Individual Women's Épée	2nd
2020-01-24	Doha, Qatar	Individual Women's Épée	3rd
2022-01-28	Doha, Qatar	Individual Women's Épée	3rd

=== World Cup ===
Date	Location	Event	Position
2012-03-23	Saint-Maur-des-Fossés, France	Individual Women's Épée	3rd
2015-02-13	Buenos Aires, Argentina	Individual Women's Épée	2nd
2016-05-20	Legnano, Italy	Individual Women's Épée	1st
2017-05-05	Rio de Janeiro, Brazil	Individual Women's Épée	3rd

Awards
Preceded by Julia Beljajeva	Estonian Athlete of the Year; 2014	Succeeded by Epp Mäe
