= Irina Embrich =

Estonian fencer

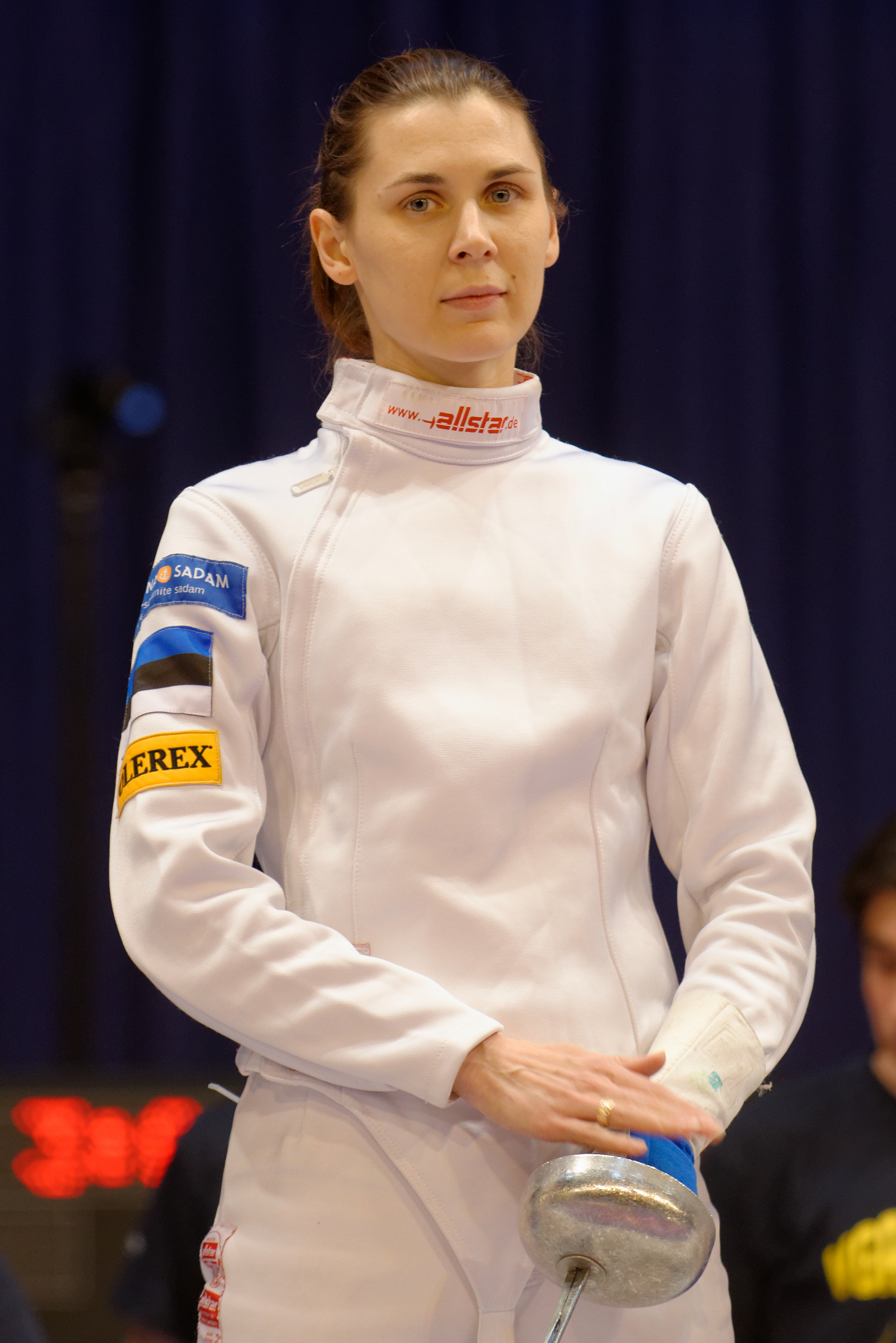
- Embrich at the Challenge International de Saint-Maur 2013

Personal information
- Nickname: Ira
- Nationality: Estonian
- Born: 12 July 1980 (age 46) Tallinn, then part of Estonian SSR, Soviet Union
- Height: 1.70 m (5 ft 7 in)
- Weight: 55 kg (121 lb)

Fencing career
- Sport: Fencing
- Weapon: Épée
- Hand: left-handed
- Club: Põhjakotkas
- FIE ranking: current ranking
Medal record
Women's épée
Representing Estonia
Olympic Games
Gold medal – first place	2020 Tokyo	Team
World Championships
Gold medal – first place	2017 Leipzig	Team
Silver medal – second place	2002 Lisbon	Team
Silver medal – second place	2006 Turin	Individual
Silver medal – second place	2014 Kazan	Team
Silver medal – second place	2026 Hong Kong	Team
Bronze medal – third place	2007 St. Petersburg	Individual
Bronze medal – third place	2025 Tbilisi	Individual
European Games
Silver medal – second place	2015 Baku	Team épée
European Championships
Gold medal – first place	2013 Zagreb	Team
Gold medal – first place	2016 Toruń	Team
Gold medal – first place	2024 Basel	Individual
Silver medal – second place	2003 Bourges	Team
Silver medal – second place	2015 Montreux	Team
Bronze medal – third place	2007 Gent	Individual
Bronze medal – third place	2012 Legnano	Team
Bronze medal – third place	2018 Novi Sad	Team

Irina Embrich, née Zamkovaja (born 12 July 1980) is an Estonian left-handed épée fencer. Embrich is the 2024 individual European champion, a two-time team European champion, and a 2017 team world champion. A two-time Olympian, Embrich is a 2021 team Olympic champion.

Embrich competed in the 2016 Rio de Janeiro Olympic Games and the 2020 Tokyo Olympic Games.

== Biography ==
Embrich's first sport was gymnastics, but she resented the hard discipline of the Soviet era. She later took to rhythmic gymnastics and then fencing under coach Samuil Kaminski. She ranked 20th then 12th at the cadet World championships in 1996 and 1998, but snatched the bronze medal at the junior event in 1999.

After high school, Embrich studied chemistry at the Tallinn University of Technology. In 2004 her coach left Estonia for Norway. Épée champion Nikolai Novosjolov, who is the same age as her, accepted to train her under an equal footing more than a student-master relationship. The same year she married a fellow student and gave birth in 2005 to a daughter, Maria. She went on in her fencing career and won the silver medal at the épée 2006 World Fencing Championships after losing the final 15–11 versus Tímea Nagy, and then the bronze medal in 2007. She was named Estonian Sportswoman of the Year 2007 for these performances.

In the 2012–13 season, she took a bronze medal at the World Cup events of Leipzig and Saint-Maur and won the team gold medal with Estonia in the European Championships in Zagreb. She ranked 10th in the World Championships in Budapest after she lost her T16 bout against Emese Szász, who eventually took a bronze medal.

In the 2013–14 season, she placed second at the Budapest Grand Prix after being defeated 7–15 in the final by world no.1 Ana Maria Brânză. This result helped her reach the 4th place in world rankings. At the 2014 European Championships at Strasbourg, she was stopped in the table of 32 by World No. 1 Emese Szász. In the team event, Estonia were defeated by Russia in the semi-final, then by Italy and finished fourth. At the 2014 World Championships in Kazan, Embrich reached the quarter-finals, defeating World No. 2 Ana Brânză along the way. She was then defeated by Italy's Rossella Fiamingo, who eventually won the gold medal.

== Medal record ==
=== Olympic Games ===
Year	Location	Event	Position
2021	Tokyo, Japan	Team Women's Épée	1st

=== World Championship ===
Year	Location	Event	Position
2006	Turin, Italy	Individual Women's Épée	2nd
2007	St. Petersburg, Russia	Individual Women's Épée	3rd
2014	Kazan, Russia	Team Women's Épée	2nd
2017	Leipzig, Germany	Team Women's Épée	1st

=== European Championship ===
Year	Location	Event	Position
2007	Ghent, Belgium	Individual Women's Épée	3rd
2012	Legnano, Italy	Team Women's Épée	3rd
2013	Zagreb, Croatia	Team Women's Épée	1st
2015	Montreux, Switzerland	Team Women's Épée	2nd
2016	Toruń, Poland	Team Women's Épée	1st
2018	Novi Sad, Serbia	Team Women's Épée	3rd
2024	Basel, Switzerland	Individual Women's Épée	1st

=== Grand Prix ===
Year	Location	Event	Position
2014-02-01	Budapest, Hungary	Individual Women's Épée	2nd
2020-03-06	Budapest, Hungary	Individual Women's Épée	3rd

=== World Cup ===
Date	Location	Event	Position
2012-06-29	Leipzig, Germany	Individual Women's Épée	2nd
2013-02-08	Leipzig, Germany	Individual Women's Épée	3rd
2013-03-01	Saint-Maur-des-Fossés, France	Individual Women's Épée	3rd
2015-11-13	Nanjing, China	Individual Women's Épée	3rd
2016-02-12	Buenos Aires, Argentina	Individual Women's Épée	2nd
2016-10-21	Tallinn, Estonia	Individual Women's Épée	3rd
2017-01-20	Barcelona, Spain	Individual Women's Épée	2nd

Awards
Preceded by Kristina Šmigun	Estonian Athlete of the Year; 2007	Succeeded by Kaia Kanepi
