= Julia Beljajeva =

Estonian fencer (born 1992)

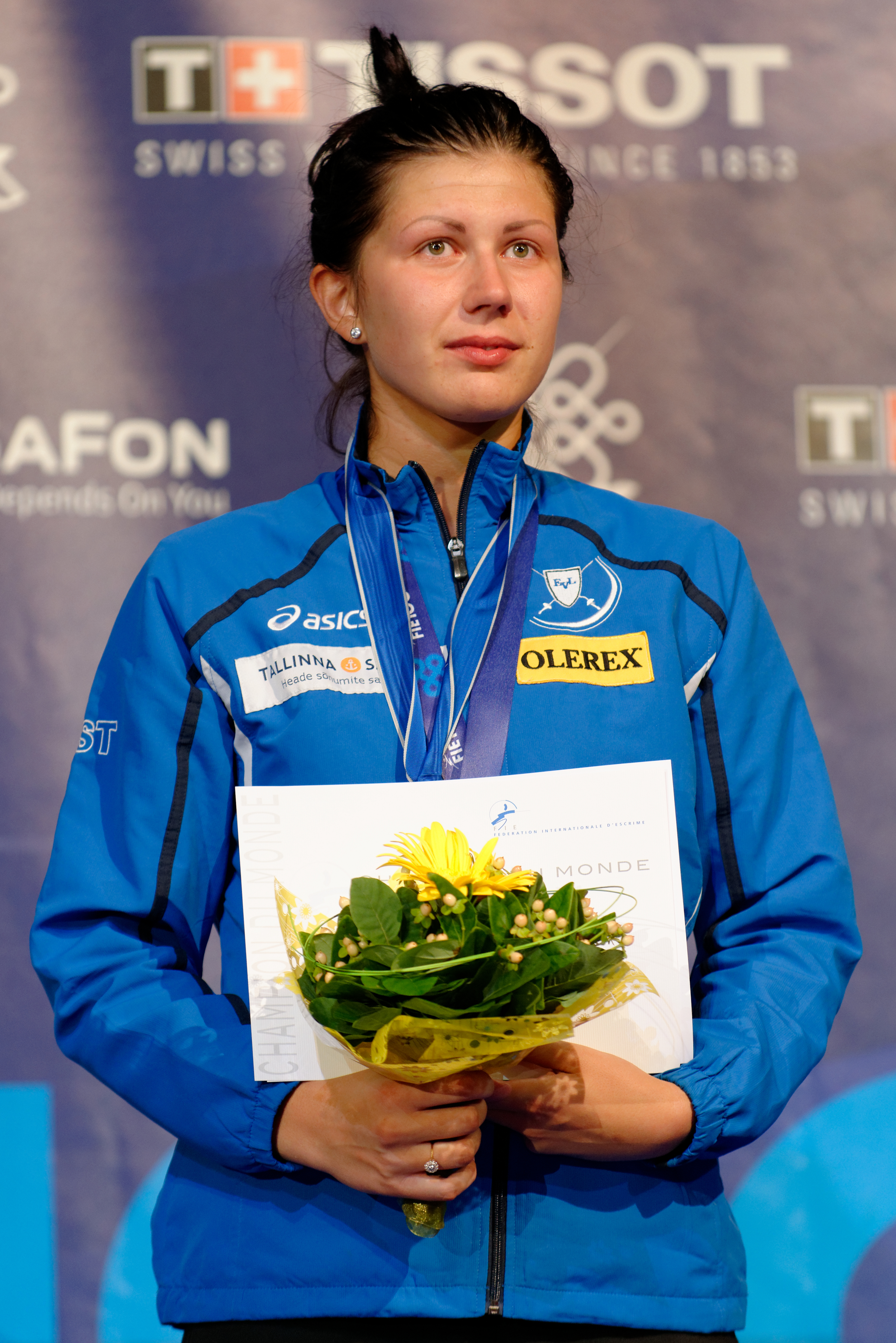
- Beljajeva at the 2013 World Fencing Championships

Personal information
- Born: 21 July 1992 (age 34) Tartu, Estonia
- Height: 1.76 m (5 ft 9 in)
- Weight: 60 kg (132 lb)

Fencing career
- Sport: Fencing
- Weapon: Épée
- Hand: Right-handed
- Club: Tartu Kalev
- Head coach: Natalja Kotova
- FIE ranking: current ranking
Medal record
Olympic Games
| Gold medal – first place | 2020 Tokyo | Team |
World Championships
| Gold medal – first place | 2013 Budapest | Individual |
| Gold medal – first place | 2017 Leipzig | Team |
| Silver medal – second place | 2014 Kazan | Team |
| Silver medal – second place | 2026 Hong Kong | Team |
| Bronze medal – third place | 2017 Leipzig | Individual |
European Games
| Silver medal – second place | 2015 Baku | Team |
European Championships
| Gold medal – first place | 2013 Zagreb | Team |
| Gold medal – first place | 2016 Toruń | Team |
| Silver medal – second place | 2015 Montreux | Team |
| Bronze medal – third place | 2012 Legnano | Team |
| Bronze medal – third place | 2017 Tbilisi | Individual |
| Bronze medal – third place | 2018 Novi Sad | Individual |
| Bronze medal – third place | 2018 Novi Sad | Team |

Julia Beljajeva (born 21 July 1992) is an Estonian right-handed épée fencer.

Beljajeva is a two-time team European champion, 2017 team world champion, and 2013 individual world champion.

A two-time Olympian, Beljajeva is a 2021 team Olympic champion.

Beljajeva competed in the 2016 Rio de Janeiro Olympic Games and the 2020 Tokyo Olympic Games.

== Career ==
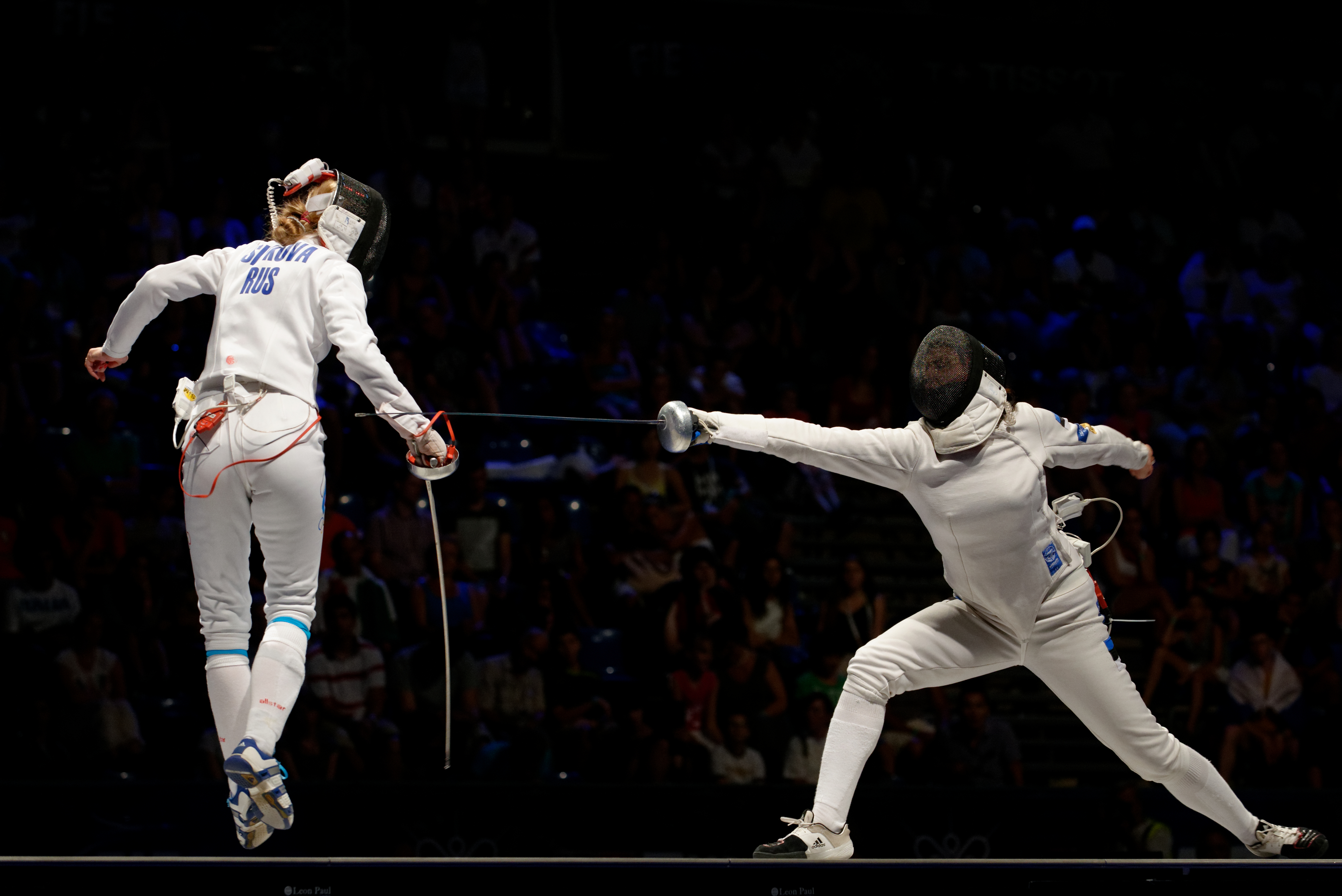
Beljajeva (right) fences Anna Sivkova at the 2013 World Championships final.

Beljajeva took up fencing when she was ten years old at the suggestion of her aunt. Her first significant award was a bronze medal in the Nordic Cadet Championships, followed in 2008 by a silver medal, then a gold medal in 2009 in the Cadet European Championships.

In the senior category, she was a member of the Estonia team that won the bronze medal in women's team épée at 2012 European Championships in Legnano and the gold medal at the 2013 European Championships in Zagreb. Ranked 69th in the International Fencing Federation's rankings, she created an upset by defeating 15–14 world No. 1 Ana Maria Brânză in the quarter-finals of the 2013 World Fencing Championships. She then prevailed 14–13 world over No.5 Emese Szász and defeated 15–14 world No.4 Anna Sivkova to win the gold medal and Estonia's second world title in épée. She finished the 2012–13 season ranked 9th, a career best as of 2014.

In the 2013–14 season Beljajeva climbed her first World Cup with a silver medal in the Doha Grand Prix, followed by a quarter-finals placing in Barcelona. At the European Championships in Strasbourg, she lost in the second round to Switzerland's Tiffany Géroudet. In the team event, Estonia were defeated by Russia in the semi-finals, then by Italy and finished 4th. At the World Championships in Kazan she was overcome in the table of 16 by teammate Erika Kirpu, who eventually earned a bronze medal, and could not defend her title. In the team event, Estonia took their revenge against Italy in the semi-finals, prevailing 42–32, but lost to Russia in the final and ended up with a silver medal. Beljajeva finished the season No. 16.

== Medal record ==
=== Olympic Games ===
| Year | Location | Event | Position |
|---|---|---|---|
| 2021 | Tokyo, Japan | Team Women's Épée | 1st |

=== World Championship ===
| Year | Location | Event | Position |
|---|---|---|---|
| 2013 | Budapest, Hungary | Individual Women's Épée | 1st |
| 2014 | Kazan, Russia | Team Women's Épée | 2nd |
| 2017 | Leipzig, Germany | Individual Women's Épée | 3rd |
| 2017 | Leipzig, Germany | Team Women's Épée | 1st |

=== European Championship ===
| Year | Location | Event | Position |
|---|---|---|---|
| 2012 | Legnano, Italy | Team Women's Épée | 3rd |
| 2013 | Zagreb, Croatia | Team Women's Épée | 1st |
| 2015 | Montreux, Switzerland | Team Women's Épée | 2nd |
| 2016 | Toruń, Poland | Team Women's Épée | 1st |
| 2017 | (Georgia (country)) Tbilisi, Georgia | Individual Women's Épée | 3rd |
| 2018 | Novi Sad, Serbia | Individual Women's Épée | 3rd |
| 2018 | Novi Sad, Serbia | Team Women's Épée | 3rd |

=== Grand Prix ===
| Date | Location | Event | Position |
|---|---|---|---|
| 2017-03-24 | Budapest, Hungary | Individual Women's Épée | 3rd |
| 2019-01-25 | Doha, Qatar | Individual Women's Épée | 1st |

=== World Cup ===
| Date | Location | Event | Position |
|---|---|---|---|
| 2014-01-17 | Doha, Qatar | Individual Women's Épée | 2nd |
| 2017-02-10 | Legnano, Italy | Individual Women's Épée | 1st |
| 2017-10-20 | Tallinn, Estonia | Individual Women's Épée | 3rd |

Awards
| Preceded by Anett Kontaveit | Estonian Young Athlete of the Year; 2013 | Succeeded by Katrina Lehis |
| Preceded by Triin Aljand | Estonian Athlete of the Year; 2013 | Succeeded by Erika Kirpu |
| Preceded by Ksenija Balta | Estonian Athlete of the Year; 2017 | Succeeded by Saskia Alusalu |
