= Katrina Lehis =

Estonian fencer (born 1994)

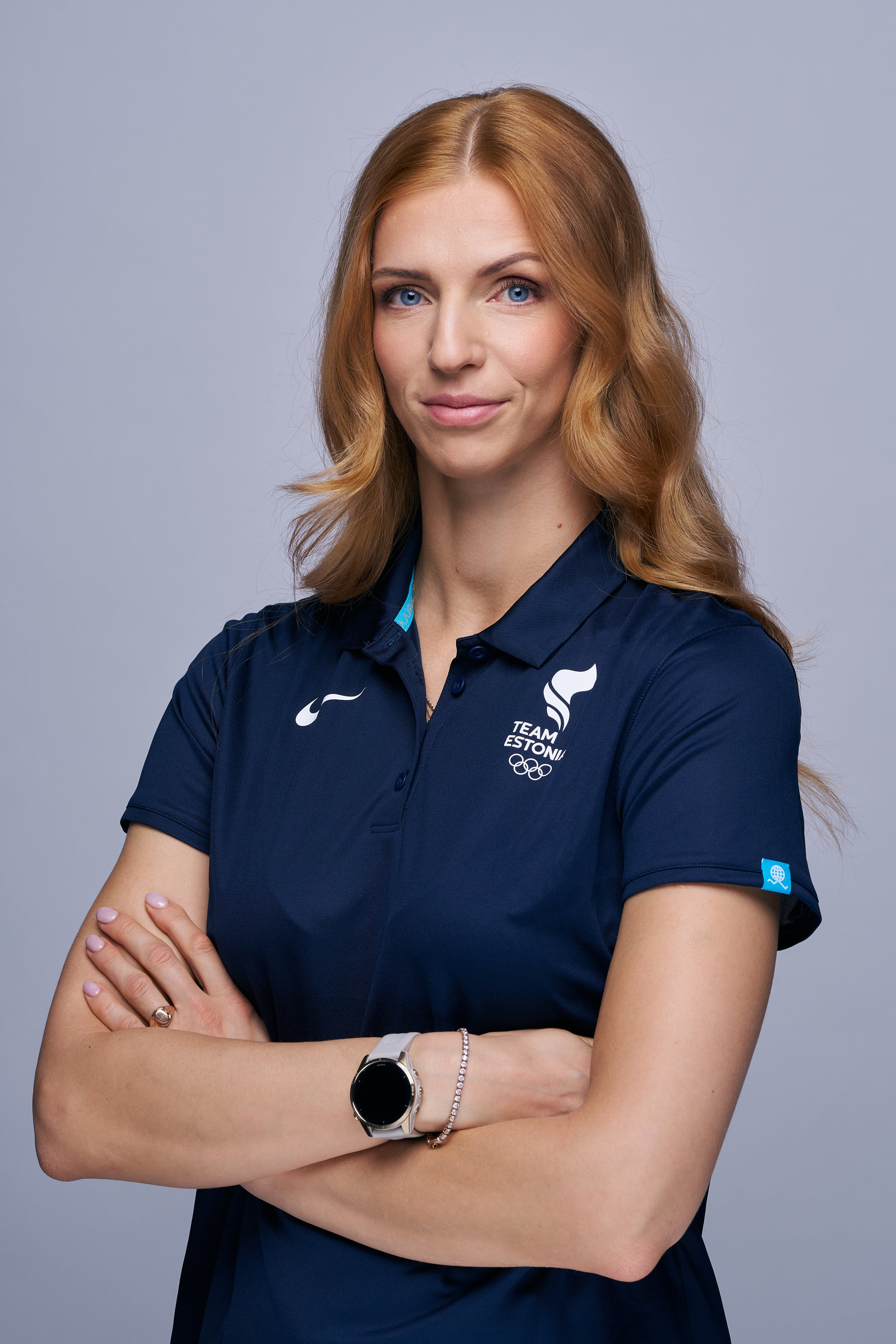
- Lehis in 2025

Personal information
- Nationality: Estonian
- Born: 19 December 1994 (age 31) Haapsalu, Estonia
- Height: 1.86 m (6 ft 1 in)
- Weight: 65 kg (143 lb)

Fencing career
- Sport: Fencing
- Weapon: épée
- Hand: left-handed
- FIE ranking: current ranking
Medal record
Women's épée
Representing Estonia
Olympic Games
Gold medal – first place	2020 Tokyo	Team
Bronze medal – third place	2020 Tokyo	Individual
World Championships
Silver medal – second place	2025 Tbilisi	Individual
Silver medal – second place	2026 Hong Kong	Team
European Games
Silver medal – second place	2015 Baku	Team
European Championships
Gold medal – first place	2018 Novi Sad	Individual
Gold medal – first place	2026 Antony	Individual
Silver medal – second place	2015 Montreux	Team
Silver medal – second place	2025 Genoa	Individual

Katrina Lehis (born 19 December 1994) is an Estonian left-handed épée fencer, 2018 individual European champion, 2021 team Olympic champion, and 2021 individual Olympic bronze medalist.

== Career ==
Lehis began fencing in 2004. Coached by Helen Nelis-Naukas and Peeter Nelis, she was a member of the Estonian Junior and Cadet fencing teams since 2009. In 2014, Lehis won individual gold at the Junior World Fencing Championships and was named Estonian Young Athlete of the Year. She won team épée silver medals at the 2015 European Fencing Championships and the 2015 European Games. In 2018, Lehis won the individual gold at the 2018 European Fencing Championships. At the 2020 Tokyo Summer Olympics, she won a gold medal in team épée and bronze in individual épée.

== Medal record ==
=== Olympic Games ===
Year	Location	Event	Position
2021	Tokyo, Japan	Individual Women's Épée	3rd
2021	Tokyo, Japan	Team Women's Épée	1st

=== World Championship ===
Year	Location	Event	Position
2025	(Georgia (country)) Tbilisi, Georgia	Individual Women's Épée	2nd

=== European Championship ===
Year	Location	Event	Position
2015	Montreux, Switzerland	Team Women's Épée	2nd
2018	Novi Sad, Serbia	Individual Women's Épée	1st
2025	Genoa, Italy	Individual Women's Épée	2nd

=== Grand Prix ===
Date	Location	Event	Position
2016-04-23	Rio de Janeiro, Brazil	Individual Women's Épée	3rd
2019-05-05	Cali, Colombia	Individual Women's Épée	3rd
2022-01-30	Doha, Qatar	Individual Women's Épée	1st
2022-03-06	Budapest, Hungary	Individual Women's Épée	3rd
2025-05-11	Bogotá, Colombia	Individual Women's Épée	3rd
2026-04-19	Budapest, Hungary	Individual Women's Épée	1st
2026-05-10	Medellín, Colombia	Individual Women's Épée	3rd

=== World Cup ===
Date	Location	Event	Position
2016-10-23	Tallinn, Estonia	Team Women's Épée	1st
2019-01-13	Havana, Cuba	Team Women's Épée	1st
2019-03-24	Chengdu, China	Team Women's Épée	2nd
2020-01-12	Havana, Cuba	Team Women's Épée	2nd
2020-02-08	Barcelona, Spain	Individual Women's Épée	1st
2023-11-11	Legnano, Italy	Individual Women's Épée	3rd
2024-11-10	Fujairah, United Arab Emirates	Team Women's Épée	1st
2024-11-23	Vancouver, Canada	Individual Women's Épée	2nd
2025-03-29	Marrakesh, Morocco	Individual Women's Épée	3rd
2025-03-30	Marrakesh, Morocco	Team Women's Épée	2nd
2025-12-07	Vancouver, Canada	Team Women's Épée	1st
2026-01-11	Fujairah, United Arab Emirates	Team Women's Épée	3rd
2026-03-28	Astana, Kazakhstan	Individual Women's Épée	2nd

== Personal life ==
In 2017, Lehis gave birth to a son.

Awards
Preceded by Kelly Sildaru	Estonian Athlete of the Year; 2021	Succeeded by Kelly Sildaru
Preceded by Julia Beljajeva	Estonian Young Athlete of the Year; 2014	Succeeded by Anett Kontaveit
