= Romania at the 2012 Summer Olympics =

- IOC code: ROU
- NOC: Romanian Olympic and Sports Committee
- Website: www.cosr.ro (in Romanian, English, and French)

in London
- Competitors: 103 in 14 sports
- Flag bearers: Horia Tecău (opening); Sandra Izbașa (closing)
- Medals Ranked 29th: Gold 2 Silver 4 Bronze 1 Total 7

Summer Olympics appearances (overview)
- 1900; 1904–1920; 1924; 1928; 1932; 1936; 1948; 1952; 1956; 1960; 1964; 1968; 1972; 1976; 1980; 1984; 1988; 1992; 1996; 2000; 2004; 2008; 2012; 2016; 2020; 2024; 2028

Romania competed at the 2012 Summer Olympics in London from 27 July to 12 August 2012. This nation has competed at the Summer Olympic Games since its official debut in 1924, missing only two editions, including the 1948 Summer Olympics. Despite being London's third Olympic Games, this is the first time the Romanian team has competed in London. The Romanian Olympic and Sports Committee (Romanian: Comitetul Olimpic și Sportiv Român, COSR) sent a total of 103 athletes to the Games, 54 men and 49 women, to compete in 14 sports.

Romania left London with a total of 9 medals (2 gold, 5 silver, and 2 bronze), beating the number of medals won in 2008 by one. This performance was considered the nation's worst at an Olympic Games since 1964, based on the gold medal standings. Three of the medals were awarded to the team in artistic gymnastics, two in judo, two in weightlifting (taken away later), and one each in fencing and shooting. Romania did not win an Olympic medal in rowing for the first time since 1976, and in athletics for the first time since 1980. On 25 November 2020 the IOC disqualified two Romanians weightlifters, Răzvan Martin and Roxana Cocoș, for doping and stripped them of their medals.

Among the nation's medalists were gymnasts Sandra Izbașa and Cătălina Ponor, who both won two medals for their individual final exercises (vault and floor). The women's artistic gymnastics team, led by Ponor and Izbașa, also managed to repeat its bronze medal in the all-around event. Rifle shooter Alin Moldoveanu became the first Romanian man to claim the gold medal in a shooting event in 12 years. Meanwhile, Rareș Dumitrescu, who missed out of the bronze medal in men's individual sabre, led his team to win the silver in the men's team sabre fencing competition.

== Medalists ==
Medal	Name	Sport	Event	Date
Gold	Alin Moldoveanu	Shooting	Men's 10 m air rifle	July 30
Gold	Sandra Izbașa	Gymnastics	Women's vault	August 5
Silver	Alina Dumitru	Judo	Women's 48 kg	July 28
Silver	Corina Căprioriu	Judo	Women's 57 kg	July 30
Silver	Rareș Dumitrescu; Tiberiu Dolniceanu; Florin Zalomir; Alexandru Sirițeanu	Fencing	Men's team sabre	August 3
Silver	Cătălina Ponor	Gymnastics	Women's floor	August 7
Bronze	Diana Bulimar; Diana Chelaru; Larisa Iordache; Sandra Izbașa; Cătălina Ponor	Gymnastics	Women's team all-around	July 31

Medals by date
Day	Date	1st place, gold medalist(s)	2nd place, silver medalist(s)	3rd place, bronze medalist(s)	Total
Day 1	28 July	0	1	0	1
Day 2	29 July	0	0	0	0
Day 3	30 July	1	1	0	2
Day 4	31 July	0	0	1	1
Day 5	1 August	0	0	0	0
Day 6	2 August	0	0	0	0
Day 7	3 August	0	1	0	1
Day 8	4 August	0	0	0	0
Day 9	5 August	1	0	0	1
Day 10	6 August	0	0	0	0
Day 11	7 August	0	1	0	1
Day 12	8 August	0	0	0	0
Day 13	9 August	0	0	0	0
Day 14	10 August	0	0	0	0
Day 15	11 August	0	0	0	0
Day 16	12 August	0	0	0	0
Total		2	4	1	7

Medals by sport
Sport	1st place, gold medalist(s)	2nd place, silver medalist(s)	3rd place, bronze medalist(s)	Total
Fencing	0	1	0	1
Gymnastics	1	1	1	3
Judo	0	2	0	2
Shooting	1	0	0	1
Total	2	4	1	7

Medals by gender
Gender	1st place, gold medalist(s)	2nd place, silver medalist(s)	3rd place, bronze medalist(s)	Total
Male	1	1	0	2
Female	1	3	1	5
Total	2	4	1	7

== Delegation ==
Comitetul Olimpic și Sportiv Român (COSR) selected a team of 103 athletes, 54 men and 49 women, to compete in 14 sports, surpassing the record in 2008 by just a single athlete. There was only a single competitor in road cycling.

The Romanian team featured past Olympic champions, four of them defending (marathon runner Constantina Diță, judoka Alina Dumitru, gymnast Sandra Izbașa, and rowing pair Georgeta Andrunache and Viorica Susanu). Eight female Romanian athletes were among the oldest of the team, including discus thrower Nicoleta Grasu, who competed at her sixth Olympics. Georgeta Andrunache became one of the most successful female rowers in Olympic history, with a total of six medals; five of them gold. Andrunache's compatriot, Viorica Susanu, who won a total of five Olympic medals, competed at her fifth Olympics, along with marathon runner Lidia Șimon. Skeet shooter Lucia Mihalache, at age 45, was the oldest athlete of the team, while gymnast Larisa Iordache was the youngest at age 16.

Other notable Romanian athletes included gymnast Cătălina Ponor, who made an Olympic comeback in her sport after eight years, swimmer and former Olympic champion Camelia Potec, who competed at her fourth Olympics, and tennis doubles specialist Horia Tecău, who became the nation's first male flag bearer at the opening ceremony since 1996.

The following is the list of number of competitors participating in the Games. Note that reserves for fencing, field hockey, football, and handball are counted as reserves:

Sport	Men	Women	Total
Athletics	2	15	17
Boxing	1	1	2
Canoeing	9	2	11
Cycling	0	1	1
Fencing	4	4	8
Gymnastics	5	5	10
Judo	3	3	6
Rowing	4	11	15
Shooting	1	1	2
Swimming	3	1	4
Table tennis	1	2	3
Tennis	2	3	5
Water polo	13	0	13
Weightlifting	3	1	4
Wrestling	2	0	2
Total	54	49	103

== Athletics ==
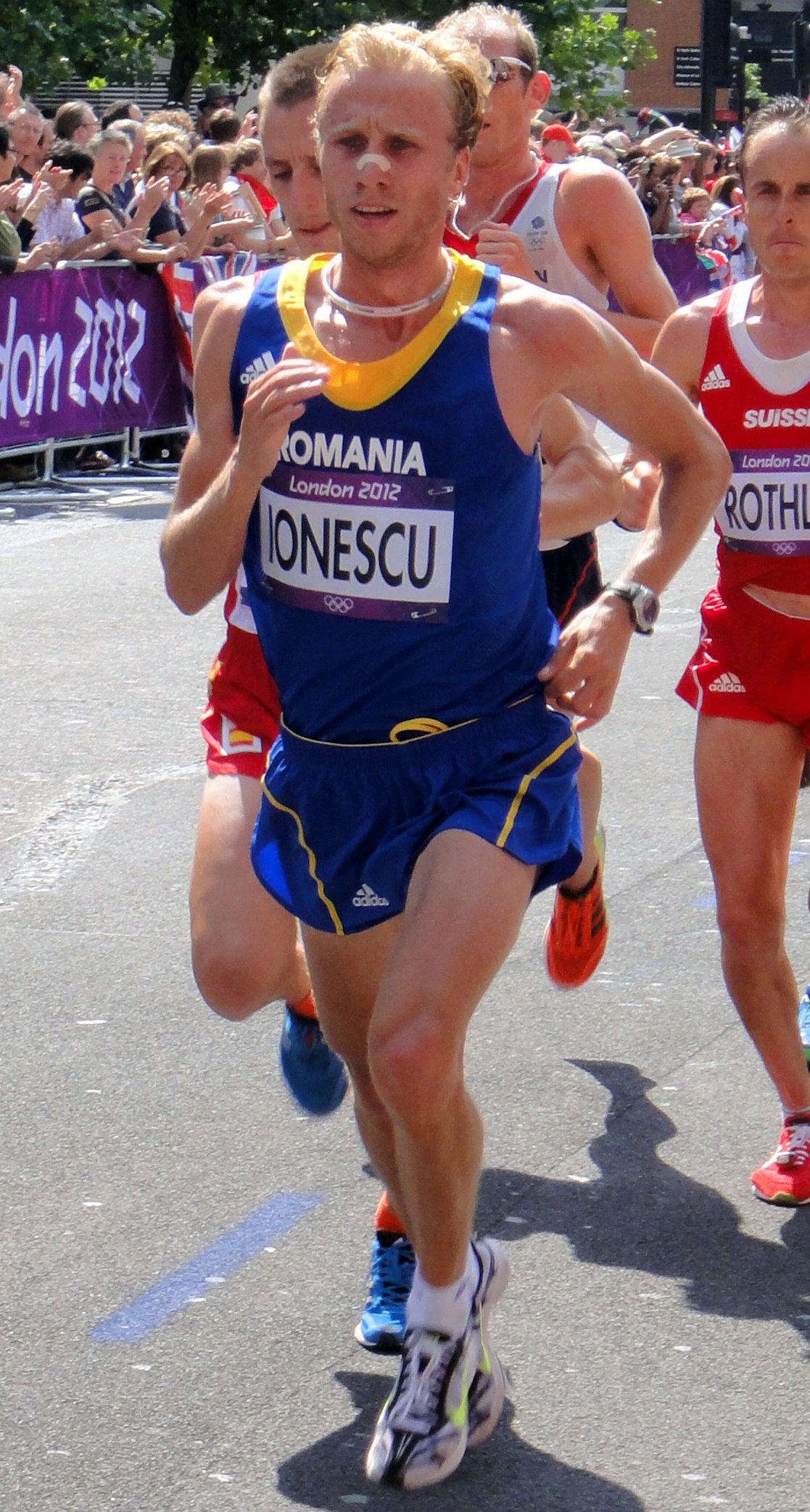
Marius Ionescu in the men's marathon.

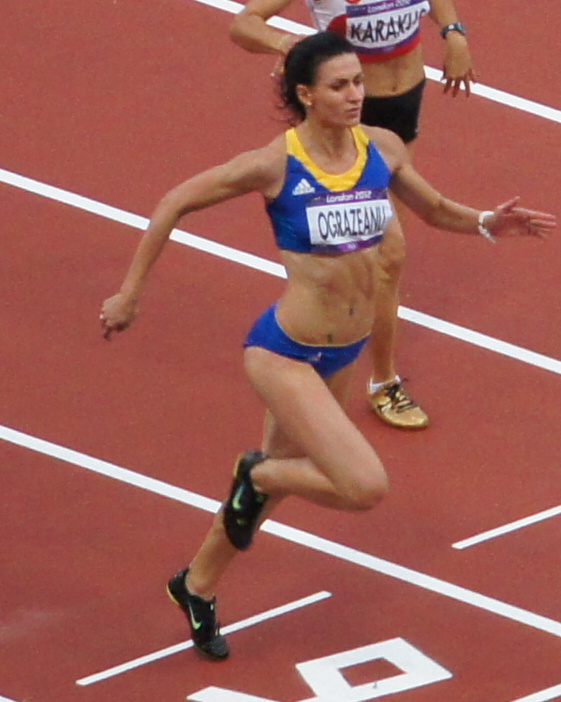
Andreea Ogrăzeanu runs the evening heat in the women's 100 m.

Romanian athletes achieved qualifying standards in the following athletics events (up to a maximum of 3 athletes in each event at the 'A' Standard, and 1 at the 'B' Standard):

Key

- Note–Ranks given for track events are within the athlete's heat only
- Q = Qualified for the next round
- q = Qualified for the next round as a fastest loser or, in field events, by position without achieving the qualifying target
- NR = National record
- N/A = Round not applicable for the event
- Bye = Athlete not required to compete in round

Men
Track & road events

Athlete	Event	Final	
Athlete	Event	Result	Rank
Marius Ionescu	Marathon	2:16:28	26
Marius Cocioran	50 km walk	3:57:52	39

Women
Track & road events

Athlete	Event	Heat		Quarterfinal		Semifinal		Final	
Athlete	Event	Result	Rank	Result	Rank	Result	Rank	Result	Rank
Andreea Ogrăzeanu	100 m	Bye		11.44	5	Did not advance			
Andreea Ogrăzeanu	200 m	23.46	6	—N/a		Did not advance			
Bianca Răzor	400 m	52.83	5	—N/a		Did not advance			
Mirela Lavric	800 m	2:01.65	4 q	—N/a		2:00.46	7	Did not advance	
Roxana Bârcă	5000 m	16:01.04	18	—N/a				Did not advance	
Angela Moroșanu	400 m hurdles	56.64	5	—N/a		Did not advance			
Ancuța Bobocel	3000 m steeplechase	9:31.06	6	—N/a				Did not advance	
Cristina Casandra	3000 m steeplechase	9:58.83	13	—N/a				Did not advance	
Constantina Diță	Marathon	—N/a						2:41:34	86
Lidia Șimon	Marathon	—N/a						2:32:46	45
Claudia Ștef	20 km walk	—N/a						1:33:56	38

Field events

Athlete	Event	Qualification		Final	
Athlete	Event	Distance	Position	Distance	Position
Viorica Țigău	Long jump	6.21	24	Did not advance	
Cristina Bujin	Triple jump	NM	—	Did not advance	
Esthera Petre	High jump	1.85	=20	Did not advance	
Nicoleta Grasu	Discus throw	61.86	14	Did not advance	
Bianca Perie	Hammer throw	68.34	22	Did not advance	

Key

- Note–Ranks given for track events are within the athlete's heat only
- Q = Qualified for the next round
- q = Qualified for the next round as a fastest loser or, in field events, by position without achieving the qualifying target
- NR = National record
- N/A = Round not applicable for the event
- Bye = Athlete not required to compete in round

== Boxing ==
Men

Athlete	Event	Round of 32	Round of 16	Quarterfinals	Semifinals	Final	
Athlete	Event	Opposition Result	Opposition Result	Opposition Result	Opposition Result	Opposition Result	Rank
Bogdan Juratoni	Middleweight	Bye	Atoev (UZB); L 10–12	Did not advance			

Women

Athlete	Event	Round of 16	Quarterfinals	Semifinals	Final	
Athlete	Event	Opposition Result	Opposition Result	Opposition Result	Opposition Result	Rank
Mihaela Lăcătuș	Lightweight	Dong C (CHN); L 5–10	Did not advance			

== Canoeing ==
=== Sprint ===
Men

Athlete	Event	Heats		Semifinals		Final	
Athlete	Event	Time	Rank	Time	Rank	Time	Rank
Josif Chirilă	C-1 1000 m	4:05.863	1 Q	4:07.794	6 FB	3:59.730	11
Alexandru Dumitrescu; Victor Mihalachi	C-2 1000 m	3:43.787	4 Q	3:36.551	3 FA	3:43.005	7
Bogdan Mada; Ionuț Mitrea	K-2 200 m	33.978	5 Q	34.253	5 FB	46.495	13
Petrus Gavrila; Toni Ioneticu; Traian Neagu; Ștefan Vasile	K-4 1000 m	3:12.371	4 Q	2:55.027	5 FA	2:58.223	8

Women

Athlete	Event	Heats		Semifinals		Final	
Athlete	Event	Time	Rank	Time	Rank	Time	Rank
Irina Lauric; Iuliana Paleu	K-2 500 m	1:46.001	3 Q	1:49.216	8 FB	1:52.468	16

Qualification Legend: FA = Qualify to final (medal); FB = Qualify to final B (non-medal)

== Cycling ==
=== Road ===
Athlete	Event	Time	Rank
Andrei Nechita	Men's road race	Did not finish	

== Fencing ==
Men

Athlete	Event	Round of 64	Round of 32	Round of 16	Quarterfinal	Semifinal	Final / BM	
Athlete	Event	Opposition Score	Opposition Score	Opposition Score	Opposition Score	Opposition Score	Opposition Score	Rank
Radu Dărăban	Individual foil	Choi (HKG); W 15–12	Aspromonte (ITA); L 11–15	Did not advance				
Tiberiu Dolniceanu	Individual sabre	Bye	Homer (USA); L 11–15	Did not advance				
Rareș Dumitrescu	Individual sabre	Bye	Boiko (UKR); W 15–12	Buikevich (BLR); W 15–6	Homer (USA); W 15–13	Occhiuzzi (ITA); L 11–15	Kovalev (RUS); L 10–15	4
Florin Zalomir	Individual sabre	Abedini (IRI); W 15–7	Gu B-G (KOR); L 12–15	Did not advance				
Tiberiu Dolniceanu; Rareș Dumitrescu; Florin Zalomir; Alexandru Sirițeanu	Team sabre	—N/a			China; W 45–30	Russia; W 45–43	South Korea; L 26–45	2nd place, silver medalist(s)

Women

Athlete	Event	Round of 64	Round of 32	Round of 16	Quarterfinal	Semifinal	Final / BM	
Athlete	Event	Opposition Score	Opposition Score	Opposition Score	Opposition Score	Opposition Score	Opposition Score	Rank
Ana Maria Brânză	Individual épée	Bye	Hsu J-T (TPE); W 15–8	Shemyakina (UKR); L 13–14	Did not advance			
Simona Gherman	Individual épée	Bye	Lawrence (GBR); W 15–9	Flessel-Colovic (FRA); W 15–13	Shemyakina (UKR); L 14–15	Did not advance		
Anca Măroiu	Individual épée	Bye	Kryvytska (UKR); W 15–10	Sivkova (RUS); W 15–11	Shin A-L (KOR); L 14–15	Did not advance		
Ana Maria Brânză; Simona Gherman; Anca Măroiu; Loredana Dinu	Team épée	—N/a			South Korea; L 38–45	Classification semi-final Italy; W 45–38	5th place final Germany; L 36–45	6
Bianca Pascu	Individual sabre	—N/a	Zhu M (CHN); L 10–15	Did not advance				

== Gymnastics ==
Women's artistic gymnastics was the best sport for Romania at the 2012 Summer Olympics. They won a bronze medal in the team competition, Sandra Izbașa won gold on vault, and Cătălina Ponor won silver on floor. This was the 10th consecutive Olympics that Romania won a medal in the women's artistic gymnastics team competition dating back to 1976; their streak ended at the next Olympics in 2016.

=== Artistic ===
Men
Team

Athlete	Event	Qualification								Final							
Athlete	Event	Apparatus						Total	Rank	Apparatus						Total	Rank
Athlete	Event	F	PH	R	V	PB	HB	Total	Rank	F	PH	R	V	PB	HB	Total	Rank
Cristian Bățagă	Team	14.666	12.700	14.833	15.766	—N/a				Did not advance							
Marius Berbecar	Team	—N/a	12.733	14.466	15.433	15.233	13.700	—N/a		Did not advance							
Ovidiu Buidoso	Team	14.366	13.766	—N/a		14.733	14.066	—N/a		Did not advance							
Vlad Cotuna	Team	15.016	—N/a	14.400	15.500	14.866	13.491	—N/a		Did not advance							
Flavius Koczi	Team	15.666 Q	13.400	14.600	16.066 Q	13.500	12.633	85.865	25 Q	Did not advance							
Total	Team	45.348	39.899	43.899	47.332	44.832	41.257	262.567	10	Did not advance							

Individual finals

Athlete	Event	Apparatus						Total	Rank
Athlete	Event	F	PH	R	V	PB	HB	Total	Rank
Flavius Koczi	All-around	Did not start							
Flavius Koczi	Floor	15.100	—N/a					15.100	7
Flavius Koczi	Vault	—N/a			15.633	—N/a		15.633	7

Women
Team

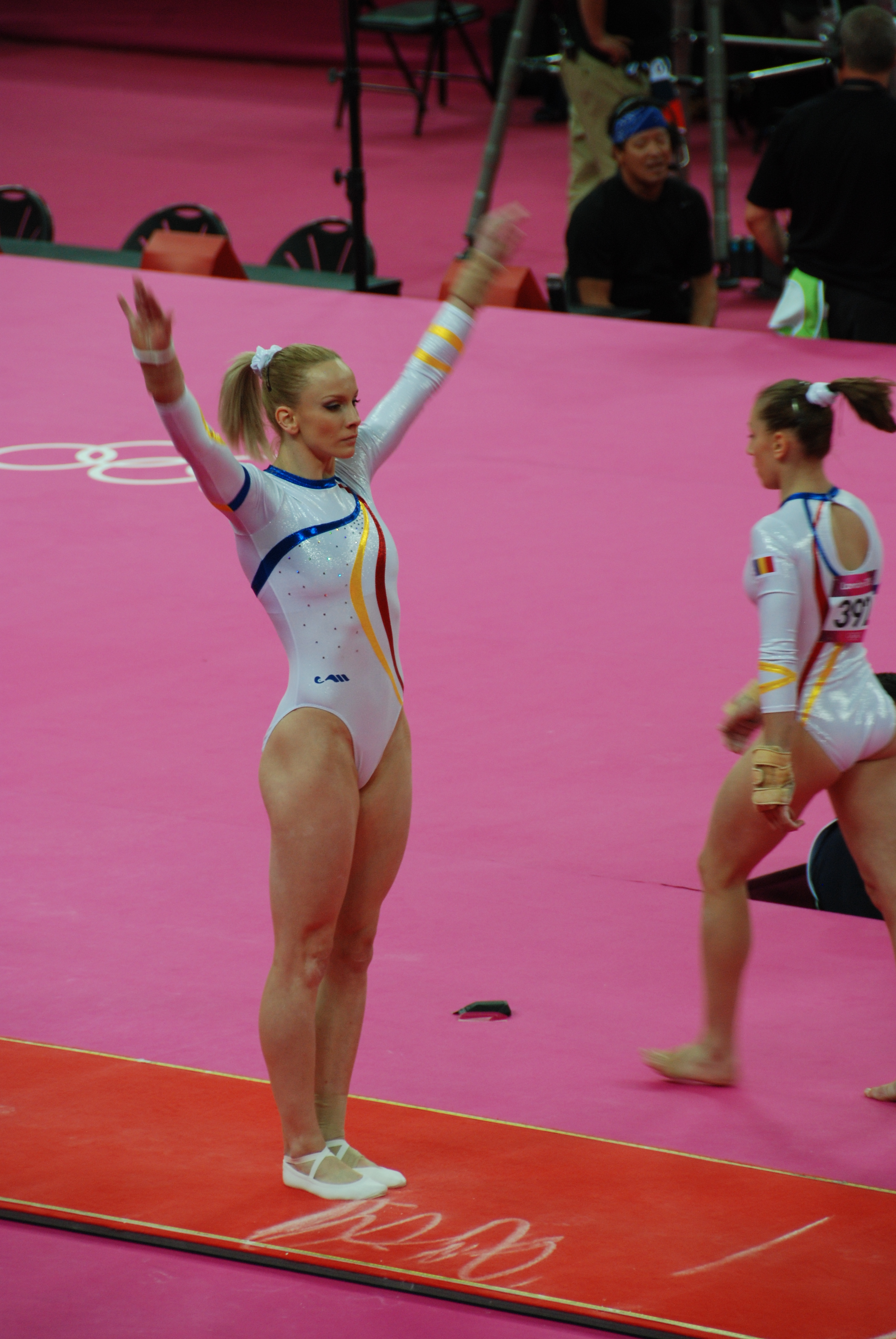
Gymnast Sandra Izbașa wins the gold medal in the women's vault competition.

Athlete	Event	Qualification						Final					
Athlete	Event	Apparatus				Total	Rank	Apparatus				Total	Rank
Athlete	Event	F	V	UB	BB	Total	Rank	F	V	UB	BB	Total	Rank
Diana Bulimar	Team	—N/a		14.000	14.866 Q	—N/a		—N/a	14.066	14.533	14.700	—N/a	
Diana Chelaru	Team	14.333	14.666	13.733	—N/a			—N/a	13.633	—N/a			
Larisa Iordache	Team	13.800	15.100	14.100	14.800	57.800	9 Q	15.100	—N/a		15.200	—N/a	
Sandra Izbașa	Team	15.066 Q	15.500 Q	12.366	14.600	57.532	11 Q	14.800	13.766	15.300	—N/a		
Cătălina Ponor	Team	14.600 Q	15.133	—N/a	15.033 Q	—N/a		15.100	—N/a	15.416	14.800	—N/a	
Total	Team	43.999	45.733	41.833	44.699	176.264	4 Q	45.000	41.464	45.249	44.700	176.414	3rd place, bronze medalist(s)

Individual finals

Athlete	Event	Apparatus				Total	Rank
Athlete	Event	F	V	UB	BB	Total	Rank
Larisa Iordache	All-around	13.833	14.933	14.233	14.966	57.965	9
Larisa Iordache	Balance beam	—N/a			14.200	14.200	6
Sandra Izbașa	All-around	15.200	15.333	13.900	14.400	58.833	5
Sandra Izbașa	Floor	13.333	—N/a			13.333	8
Sandra Izbașa	Vault	—N/a	15.191	—N/a		15.191	1st place, gold medalist(s)
Cătălina Ponor	Floor	15.200	—N/a			15.200	2nd place, silver medalist(s)
Cătălina Ponor	Balance beam	—N/a			15.066	15.066	4

== Judo ==
Men

Athlete	Event	Round of 64	Round of 32	Round of 16	Quarterfinals	Semifinals	Repechage	Final / BM	
Athlete	Event	Opposition Result	Opposition Result	Opposition Result	Opposition Result	Opposition Result	Opposition Result	Opposition Result	Rank
Dan Fâșie	−66 kg	Bye	Larose (FRA); L 0000–0100	Did not advance					
Daniel Brata	−100 kg	—N/a	Zhorzholiani (GEO); L 0013–0102	Did not advance					
Vlăduț Simionescu	+100 kg	—N/a	Krakovetskii (KGZ); W 1001–0001	Tölzer (GER); L 1000–0000	Did not advance				

Women

Athlete	Event	Round of 32	Round of 16	Quarterfinals	Semifinals	Repechage	Final / BM	
Athlete	Event	Opposition Result	Opposition Result	Opposition Result	Opposition Result	Opposition Result	Opposition Result	Rank
Alina Dumitru	−48 kg	—N/a	Mestre (CUB); W 1000–0000	Munkhbat (MGL); W 0011–0001	Fukumi (JPN); W 0102–0011	Bye	Menezes (BRA); L 0000–0011	2nd place, silver medalist(s)
Andreea Chițu	−52 kg	Haddad (ALG); W 0100–0000	Heylen (BEL); L 0000–0010	Did not advance				
Corina Căprioriu	−57 kg	Wang (CHN); W 0102–0000	Raguib (DJI); W 0100–0000	Karakas (HUN); W 0000–0000 YUS	Malloy (USA); W 0100–0000	Bye	Matsumoto (JPN); L 0000–0100	2nd place, silver medalist(s)

== Rowing ==
For the first time in 36 years Romania did not win any medals in rowing.

Men

Athlete	Event	Heats		Repechage		Semifinals		Final	
Athlete	Event	Time	Rank	Time	Rank	Time	Rank	Time	Rank
Marius Vasile Cozmiuc; Florin Curuea; George Alexandru Pălămariu; Cristi-Ilie Pîrghie	Four	5:52.87	2 SA/B	Bye		6:12.74	12 FB	6:16.20	12

Women

Athlete	Event	Heats		Repechage		Final	
Athlete	Event	Time	Rank	Time	Rank	Time	Rank
Georgeta Andrunache; Viorica Susanu	Pair	7:05.39	3 R	7:08.42	1 FA	7:37.67	5
Nicoleta Albu; Enikő Barabás; Roxana Cogianu; Adelina Cojocariu; Irina Dorneanu; Teodora Gîdoiu; Cristina Grigoraș; Camelia Lupașcu; Ioana Rotaru	Eight	6:16.61	2 R	6:16:16	2 FA	6:17.64	4

Qualification Legend: FA=Final A (medal); FB=Final B (non-medal); FC=Final C (non-medal); FD=Final D (non-medal); FE=Final E (non-medal); FF=Final F (non-medal); SA/B=Semifinals A/B; SC/D=Semifinals C/D; SE/F=Semifinals E/F; QF=Quarterfinals; R=Repechage

== Shooting ==
Men

Athlete	Event	Qualification		Final	
Athlete	Event	Points	Rank	Points	Rank
Alin Moldoveanu	10 m air rifle	599	2	702.1	1st place, gold medalist(s)

Women

Athlete	Event	Qualification		Final	
Athlete	Event	Points	Rank	Points	Rank
Lucia Mihalache	Skeet	65	12	Did not advance	

== Swimming ==
Romanian swimmers achieved qualifying standards in the following events (up to a maximum of 2 swimmers in each event at the Olympic Qualifying Time (OQT), and potentially 1 at the Olympic Selection Time (OST)):

Men

Athlete	Event	Heat		Semifinal		Final	
Athlete	Event	Time	Rank	Time	Rank	Time	Rank
Dragoș Agache	100 m breaststroke	1:02.93	=37	Did not advance			
Alexandru Coci	200 m butterfly	1:59.67	29	Did not advance			
Norbert Trandafir	50 m freestyle	22.22 NR	15 Q	22.30	16	Did not advance	
Norbert Trandafir	100 m freestyle	49.02	17	Did not advance			

Women

Athlete	Event	Heat		Semifinal		Final	
Athlete	Event	Time	Rank	Time	Rank	Time	Rank
Camelia Potec	200 m freestyle	2:01.15	25	Did not advance			
Camelia Potec	400 m freestyle	4:11.43	20	—N/a		Did not advance	
Camelia Potec	800 m freestyle	8:38.44	23	—N/a		Did not advance	

== Table tennis ==
Romania qualified three athletes for singles table tennis events based on their world rankings as of 16 May 2011. Adrian Crișan qualified for the men's event; Daniela Dodean and Elizabeta Samara qualified for the women's.

Athlete	Event	Preliminary round	Round 1	Round 2	Round 3	Round 4	Quarterfinals	Semifinals	Final / BM	
Athlete	Event	Opposition Result	Opposition Result	Opposition Result	Opposition Result	Opposition Result	Opposition Result	Opposition Result	Opposition Result	Rank
Adrian Crișan	Men's singles	Bye			He (ESP); W 4–2	Boll (GER); W 4–1	Chuang C-y (TPE); L 0–4	Did not advance		
Daniela Dodean	Women's singles	Bye		Bilenko (UKR); W 4–3	Ding N (CHN); L 0–4	Did not advance				
Elizabeta Samara	Women's singles	Bye		Meshref (EGY); W 4–1	Tie Y N (HKG); W 4–2	Li J (NED); L 2–4	Did not advance			

== Tennis ==
Athlete	Event	Round of 64	Round of 32	Round of 16	Quarterfinals	Semifinals	Final / BM	
Athlete	Event	Opposition Score	Opposition Score	Opposition Score	Opposition Score	Opposition Score	Opposition Score	Rank
Adrian Ungur	Men's singles	Müller (LUX); L 3–6, 3–6	Did not advance					
Horia Tecău; Adrian Ungur	Men's doubles	—N/a	Nestor / Pospisil (CAN); L 3–6, 6–7^{(9–11)}	Did not advance				
Irina-Camelia Begu	Women's singles	Azarenka (BLR); L 1–6, 6–3, 1–6	Did not advance					
Sorana Cîrstea	Women's singles	Pennetta (ITA); L 2–6, 6–4, 2–6	Did not advance					
Simona Halep	Women's singles	Shvedova (KAZ); L 4–6, 2–6	Did not advance					
Sorana Cîrstea; Simona Halep	Women's doubles	—N/a	S Williams / V Williams (USA); L 3–6, 2–6	Did not advance				

== Water polo ==
=== Men's tournament ===
Team roster

The following is the Romanian roster in the men's water polo tournament of the 2012 Summer Olympics.

№	Name	Pos.	Height	Weight	Date of birth	2012 club
1	Dragoș Stoenescu	GK	1.96 m (6 ft 5 in)	96 kg (212 lb)	30 May 1979	(Romania) CS Dinamo București
2	Cosmin Radu	CF	1.93 m (6 ft 4 in)	110 kg (243 lb)	9 November 1981	(Croatia) HAVK Mladost
3	Tiberiu Negrean	D	1.87 m (6 ft 2 in)	85 kg (187 lb)	1 September 1988	(Hungary) Szolnoki Vizilabda SC
4	Nicolae Diaconu	D	1.80 m (5 ft 11 in)	88 kg (194 lb)	4 September 1980	(Romania) CSM Oradea
5	Andrei Iosep	D	1.95 m (6 ft 5 in)	99 kg (218 lb)	20 September 1977	(Spain) CW Havarra
6	Andrei Bușilă	CB	1.91 m (6 ft 3 in)	92 kg (203 lb)	10 November 1980	(Romania) CSM Oradea
7	Alexandru Matei	D	1.95 m (6 ft 5 in)	95 kg (209 lb)	31 December 1980	(Romania) CS Dinamo București
8	Mihnea Chioveanu	CF	1.98 m (6 ft 6 in)	115 kg (254 lb)	21 August 1987	(Romania) CSM Oradea
9	Dimitri Goantă	CB	2.02 m (6 ft 8 in)	113 kg (249 lb)	17 July 1987	(Switzerland) SC Horgen
10	Ramiro Georgescu	D	1.93 m (6 ft 4 in)	93 kg (205 lb)	27 November 1982	(Hungary) Szolnoki Vizilabda SC
11	Alexandru Ghiban	CB	1.96 m (6 ft 5 in)	96 kg (212 lb)	12 October 1986	(Romania) CSM Oradea
12	Kalman Kadar	CB	1.90 m (6 ft 3 in)	84 kg (185 lb)	11 June 1979	(Romania) CSM Oradea
13	Mihai Drăgușin	GK	1.88 m (6 ft 2 in)	85 kg (187 lb)	5 January 1984	(Romania) CSA Steaua București

Head coach: István Kovács

Group play

Team	Pld	W	D	L	GF	GA	GD	Pts	Qualification
Serbia	5	4	1	0	69	38	+31	9	Quarterfinals
Montenegro	5	3	1	1	54	41	+13	7	Quarterfinals
Hungary	5	3	0	2	65	52	+13	6	Quarterfinals
United States	5	3	0	2	43	44	−1	6	Quarterfinals
Romania	5	1	0	4	48	55	−7	2	
Great Britain	5	0	0	5	28	77	−49	0	

29 July 2012; 18:20	Report	Romania	13–4	Great Britain	Water Polo Arena, London; Referees: German Moller (ARG), Anton Bervoets (NED)
29 July 2012; 18:20	Report	Score by quarters: 2–1, 4–0, 3–2, 4–1			Water Polo Arena, London; Referees: German Moller (ARG), Anton Bervoets (NED)
29 July 2012; 18:20	Report	Diaconu 4	Goals	Parker 2	Water Polo Arena, London; Referees: German Moller (ARG), Anton Bervoets (NED)

31 July 2012; 19:40	Report	United States	10–8	Romania	Water Polo Arena, London; Referees: Dragan Stampalija (CRO), Massimiliano Caputi (ITA)
31 July 2012; 19:40	Report	Score by quarters: 3–3, 1–2, 3–0, 3–3			Water Polo Arena, London; Referees: Dragan Stampalija (CRO), Massimiliano Caputi (ITA)
31 July 2012; 19:40	Report	Varellas, Bailey 3	Goals	Radu 4	Water Polo Arena, London; Referees: Dragan Stampalija (CRO), Massimiliano Caputi (ITA)

2 August 2012; 15:30	Report	Romania	15–17	Hungary	Water Polo Arena, London; Referees: Massimiliano Balfanbayev (KAZ), Sergi Sanchez (ESP)
2 August 2012; 15:30	Report	Score by quarters: 4–5, 5–4, 2-5, 4-3			Water Polo Arena, London; Referees: Massimiliano Balfanbayev (KAZ), Sergi Sanchez (ESP)
2 August 2012; 15:30	Report	Bușilă, Ghiban 3	Goals	Madaras 5	Water Polo Arena, London; Referees: Massimiliano Balfanbayev (KAZ), Sergi Sanchez (ESP)

4 August 2012; 10:00	Report	Montenegro	12–8	Romania	Water Polo Arena, London; Referees: Daniel Flahive (AUS), Alan Balfanbayev (KAZ)
4 August 2012; 10:00	Report	Score by quarters: 3–1, 2–1, 3–2, 4–4			Water Polo Arena, London; Referees: Daniel Flahive (AUS), Alan Balfanbayev (KAZ)
4 August 2012; 10:00	Report	Ivović 3	Goals	Diaconu 3	Water Polo Arena, London; Referees: Daniel Flahive (AUS), Alan Balfanbayev (KAZ)

6 August 2012; 14:10	Report	Romania	4–12	Serbia	Water Polo Arena, London; Referees: Ulrich Spiegel (GER), Steven Rotsart (USA)
6 August 2012; 14:10	Report	Score by quarters: 0–3, 1–3, 0–4, 3–2			Water Polo Arena, London; Referees: Ulrich Spiegel (GER), Steven Rotsart (USA)
6 August 2012; 14:10	Report	four players 1	Goals	Nikić, Mitrović 3	Water Polo Arena, London; Referees: Ulrich Spiegel (GER), Steven Rotsart (USA)

== Weightlifting ==
Athlete	Event	Snatch		Clean & Jerk		Total	Rank
Athlete	Event	Result	Rank	Result	Rank	Total	Rank
Florin Croitoru	Men's −56 kg	121	8	147	9	268	9
Răzvan Martin	Men's −69 kg	152	2	180	4	322	DSQ
Gabriel Sîncrăian	Men's −85 kg	~~167~~	DNF	—	—	—	DNF
Roxana Cocoș	Women's −69 kg	113	4	143	2	256	DSQ

== Wrestling ==
Key:

- VT - Victory by Fall.
- PP - Decision by Points - the loser with technical points.
- PO - Decision by Points - the loser without technical points.

Men's freestyle

Athlete	Event	Qualification	Round of 16	Quarterfinal	Semifinal	Repechage 1	Repechage 2	Final / BM	
Athlete	Event	Opposition Result	Opposition Result	Opposition Result	Opposition Result	Opposition Result	Opposition Result	Opposition Result	Rank
Rareș Chintoan	−120 kg	Bye	Shabanbay (KAZ); L 1–3 ^{PP}	Did not advance					10

Men's Greco-Roman

Athlete	Event	Qualification	Round of 16	Quarterfinal	Semifinal	Repechage 1	Repechage 2	Final	
Athlete	Event	Opposition Result	Opposition Result	Opposition Result	Opposition Result	Opposition Result	Opposition Result	Opposition Result	Rank
Alin Alexuc-Ciurariu	−96 kg	Guri (BUL); L 0–3 ^{PO}	Did not advance						16
