= Cosmin Hănceanu =

Romanian fencer

Personal information
- Born: 26 July 1986 (age 39) Iași, Romania

Fencing career
- Sport: Fencing
- Country: Romania
- Weapon: Sabre
- Hand: right-handed
- National coach: Mihai Covaliu
- Club: CSA Steaua București
- Assistant coach: Dan Găureanu
- Former coach: Iulian Bițucă
- Retired: 2012
- FIE ranking: ranking
Medal record
World Championships
Gold medal – first place	2009 Antalya	Team sabre
Bronze medal – third place	2010 Paris	Sabre
Bronze medal – third place	2010 Paris	Team sabre
European Championships
Silver medal – second place	2009 Plovdiv	Team sabre

Cosmin Hănceanu (born 26 July 1986) is a Romanian sabre fencer, team world champion in 2009. He won the bronze medal in the 2010 World Fencing Championships.

== Career ==
Hănceanu began fencing at age ten at his local club, CSM Iași, with Iulian Bițucă as coach. He later transferred to CSA Steaua in Bucharest.

Hănceanu joined Florin Zalomir, Tiberiu Dolniceanu and Rareș Dumitrescu in the national team. In the 2008–09 season, Romania won a silver medal in the European Championships at Plovdiv. In the World Championships in Antalya, Romania defeated Germany, then France and Hungary. In the final they met Italy again and this time prevailed 45–44 to take the first World title in sabre for Romania. For this performance, Hănceanu and his team-mates received the Order of Sports Merit, class IIa.

In the 2010 World Fencing Championships, Hănceanu started the competition 53rd in world rankings. He created an upset by making his way to the quarter-finals, where he defeated 15–13 Russia's Aleksey Yakimenko. He was beaten 15–10 in the semi-final by Won Woo-young of South Korea and came away with a bronze medal. In the team event, Romania were beaten 45–32 by Russia in the semi-final, then defeated Belarus 45–41 in the match for the third place.

Hănceanu was set to take part to the 2012 Summer Olympics in London, but Dolniceanu was substituted at the last minute. Hănceanu retired and became a coach at CSA Steaua.
