= Fencing at the 2015 European Games – Men's sabre =

Men's sabre at the 2015 European Games
- Venue: Crystal Hall 3
- Date: 23 June
- Competitors: 36 from 18 nations

Medalists
gold medal	Andriy Yahodka	Ukraine
silver medal	Tiberiu Dolniceanu	Romania
bronze medal	Alberto Pellegrini	Italy
bronze medal	Luigi Miracco	Italy

The men's sabre competition at the 2015 European Games in Baku was held on 23 June at the Crystal Hall 3.

== Schedule ==
All times are local (UTC+5).

Date	Time	Event
Tuesday, 23 June 2015	11:50	Preliminaries
Tuesday, 23 June 2015	14:30	Round of 32
Tuesday, 23 June 2015	15:20	Round of 16
Tuesday, 23 June 2015	16:20	Quarterfinals
Tuesday, 23 June 2015	19:00	Semifinals
Tuesday, 23 June 2015	19:50	Final

== Results ==
=== Preliminaries ===
==== Pool A ====
Seed	Athlete	(Greece)	(Turkey)	(Azerbaijan)	(Spain)	(Romania)	(United Kingdom)	V	B	V/B	HS	HR	Diff.	RP	RT
36	Georges Tsouroutas (GRE)		V	3	1	2	1	1	5	0.200	12	23	−11	=5	=30
24	İbrahim Ahmet Ant (TUR)	3		V	1	3	0	1	5	0.200	12	23	−11	=5	=30
25	Azar Taghiyev (AZE)	V	3		3	3	4	1	5	0.200	18	23	−5	4	26
14	Fernando Casares (ESP)	V	V	V		1	V	4	5	0.800	21	12	9	2	9
1	Tiberiu Dolniceanu (ROU)	V	V	V	V		4	4	5	0.800	24	14	10	1	7
13	James Honeybone (GBR)	V	V	V	2	V		4	5	0.800	22	14	8	3	10

==== Pool B ====
Seed	Athlete	(France)	(Russia)	(Moldova)	(Germany)	(Hungary)	(Romania)	V	B	V/B	HS	HR	Diff.	RP	RT
2	Nicolas Rousset (FRA)		0	V	V	V	2	3	5	0.600	17	18	−1	3	19
11	Boris Savich (RUS)	V		V	V	4	V	4	5	0.800	24	8	16	1	2
26	Piotr Mateisin (MDA)	4	0		0	0	0	0	5	0.000	4	25	−21	6	36
22	Robin Schrödter (GER)	4	2	V		3	1	1	5	0.200	15	20	−5	5	27
35	Etele Ravasz (HUN)	0	V	V	V		1	3	5	0.600	16	17	−1	4	20
12	Iulian Teodosiu (ROU)	V	1	V	V	V		4	5	0.800	21	9	12	2	6

==== Pool C ====
Seed	Athlete	(Russia)	(Italy)	(Belgium)	(Germany)	(Hungary)	(Ukraine)	V	B	V/B	HS	HR	Diff.	RP	RT
15	Ilya Motorin (RUS)		4	0	V	V	2	2	5	0.400	16	20	−4	5	24
18	Giovanni Repetti (ITA)	V		4	V	V	2	3	5	0.600	21	18	3	3	15
10	Seppe Van Holsbeke (BEL)	V	V		V	4	V	4	5	0.800	24	15	9	1	8
34	Mădălin Bucur (ROU)	3	2	3		V	V	2	5	0.400	18	22	−4	4	23
27	Martin Singer (HUN)	2	2	V	4		1	1	5	0.200	14	24	−10	6	28
3	Andriy Yahodka (UKR)	V	V	3	3	V		3	5	0.600	21	15	6	2	13

==== Pool D ====
Seed	Athlete	(Hungary)	(Germany)	(Romania)	(Italy)	(Azerbaijan)	(Poland)	V	B	V/B	HS	HR	Diff.	RP	RT
28	Bence Gémesi (HUN)		4	3	3	V	V	2	5	0.400	20	20	0	4	21
21	Björn Hübner (GER)	V		4	1	V	4	2	5	0.400	19	22	−3	5	22
4	Alin Badea (ROU)	V	V		V	V	4	4	5	0.800	24	17	7	2	12
9	Massimiliano Murolo (ITA)	V	V	4		V	V	4	5	0.800	24	11	13	1	4
32	Abdulla Hasanov (AZE)	2	3	1	1		1	0	5	0.000	8	25	−17	6	35
16	Adam Skrodzki (POL)	3	V	V	1	V		3	5	0.600	19	19	0	3	18

==== Pool E ====
Seed	Athlete	(Russia)	(Belarus)	(Azerbaijan)	(Germany)	(Italy)	(Hungary)	V	B	V/B	HS	HR	Diff.	RP	RT
17	Alexander Trushakov (RUS)		2	V	V	3	V	3	5	0.600	20	17	3	4	16
5	Aliaksandr Buikevich (BLR)	V		V	0	V	V	4	5	0.800	20	12	8	2	11
29	Javanshir Safarov (AZE)	0	0		0	0	V	1	5	0.200	6	24	−18	5	32
20	Maximilian Kindler (GER)	4	V	V		V	V	4	5	0.800	24	10	14	1	3
8	Luigi Miracco (ITA)	V	3	V	1		V	3	5	0.600	19	15	4	3	14
33	Márton Bence Csaba (HUN)	3	1	4	4	2		0	5	0.000	14	25	−11	6	33

==== Pool F ====
Seed	Athlete	(Germany)	(Bulgaria)	(Azerbaijan)	(Austria)	(Russia)	(Italy)	V	B	V/B	HS	HR	Diff.	RP	RT
6	Richard Hübers (GER)		V	V	V	V	3	4	5	0.800	23	11	12	2	5
30	Atanas Arnaudov (BUL)	1		3	3	2	1	0	5	0.000	10	25	−15	6	34
31	Javanshir Aghakishiyev (AZE)	1	1		3	3	1	1	5	0.200	13	23	−10	5	29
19	Matthias Willau (AUT)	4	V	V		0	1	2	5	0.400	15	21	−6	4	25
23	Nikita Proskura (RUS)	0	V	V	V		2	3	5	0.600	17	15	2	3	17
7	Alberto Pellegrini (ITA)	V	V	V	V	V		5	5	1.000	25	8	17	1	1

=== Knockout round ===
==== Final ====
Final
13	Andriy Yahodka (UKR)	15
7	Tiberiu Dolniceanu (ROU)	10

==== Top half ====
Round of 32
17	Nikita Proskura (RUS)	6
16	Alexander Trushakov (RUS)	15
9	Fernando Casares (ESP)	15
24	Ilya Motorin (RUS)	13
25	Matthias Willau (AUT)	8
8	Seppe Van Holsbeke (BEL)	15
5	Richard Hübers (GER)	15
28	Martin Singer (HUN)	8
21	Bence Gémesi (HUN)	9
12	Alin Badea (ROU)	15
13	Andriy Yahodka (UKR)	15
20	Etele Ravasz (HUN)	9

Round of 16
1	Alberto Pellegrini (ITA)	15
16	Alexander Trushakov (RUS)	12
9	Fernando Casares (ESP)	15
8	Seppe Van Holsbeke (BEL)	14
5	Richard Hübers (GER)	12
12	Alin Badea (ROU)	15
13	Andriy Yahodka (UKR)	15
4	Massimiliano Murolo (ITA)	13

Quarterfinals
1	Alberto Pellegrini (ITA)	15
9	Fernando Casares (ESP)	13
12	Alin Badea (ROU)	8
13	Andriy Yahodka (UKR)	15

Semifinals
1	Alberto Pellegrini (ITA)	11
13	Andriy Yahodka (UKR)	15

==== Bottom half ====
Round of 32
19	Nicolas Rousset (FRA)	6
14	Luigi Miracco (ITA)	15
11	Aliaksandr Buikevich (BLR)	15
22	Björn Hübner (GER)	6
27	Robin Schrödter (GER)	12
6	Iulian Teodosiu (ROU)	15
7	Tiberiu Dolniceanu (ROU)	15
26	Azar Taghiyev (AZE)	5
23	Mădălin Bucur (ROU)	6
10	James Honeybone (GBR)	15
15	Giovanni Repetti (ITA)	15
18	Adam Skrodzki (POL)	11

Round of 16
3	Maximilian Kindler (GER)	13
14	Luigi Miracco (ITA)	15
11	Aliaksandr Buikevich (BLR)	11
6	Iulian Teodosiu (ROU)	15
7	Tiberiu Dolniceanu (ROU)	15
10	James Honeybone (GBR)	10
15	Giovanni Repetti (ITA)	12
2	Boris Savich (RUS)	15

Quarterfinals
14	Luigi Miracco (ITA)	15
6	Iulian Teodosiu (ROU)	10
7	Tiberiu Dolniceanu (ROU)	15
2	Boris Savich (RUS)	10

Semifinals
14	Luigi Miracco (ITA)	11
7	Tiberiu Dolniceanu (ROU)	15
