= 2008–09 Fencing World Cup =

International fencing competition

The 38th FIE Fencing World Cup began in October 2008 and concluded in October 2009 at the 2009 World Fencing Championships held in Antalya, Turkey.

== Individual Épée ==
Men
| 1 | Gauthier Grumier (FRA) | 310 |
| 2 | Sven Schmid (GER) | 252 |
| 3 | Alfredo Rota (ITA) | 224 |
| 4 | Jörg Fiedler (GER) | 186 |
| 5 | Gábor Boczkó (HUN) | 168 |
| 6 | José Luis Abajo (ESP) | 158 |
| 7 | Silvio Fernández (VEN) | 156 |
| 8 | Paolo Pizzo (ITA) | 156 |
| 9 | Matteo Tagliariol (ITA) | 156 |
| 10 | Jérôme Jeannet (FRA) | 152 |

Women
| 1 | Ana Maria Brânză (ROU) | 304 |
| 2 | Anna Sivkova (RUS) | 238 |
| 3 | Britta Heidemann (GER) | 230 |
| 4 | Emese Szász (HUN) | 224 |
| 5 | Laura Flessel-Colovic (FRA) | 222 |
| 6 | Lyubov Shutova (RUS) | 220 |
| 7 | Sonja Tol (NED) | 180 |
| 8 | Nathalie Moellhausen (ITA) | 174 |
| 9 | Tatiana Logunova (RUS) | 162 |
| 10 | Sherraine Schalm (CAN) | 156 |

== Individual Foil ==
Men
| 1 | Andrea Baldini (ITA) | 320 |
| 2 | Peter Joppich (GER) | 258 |
| 3 | Radosław Glonek (POL) | 250 |
| 4 | Richard Kruse (GBR) | 232 |
| 5 | Andrea Cassarà (ITA) | 228 |
| 6 | Yuki Ota (JPN) | 224 |
| 7 | Erwann Le Péchoux (FRA) | 210 |
| 8 | Kurt Getz (USA) | 174 |
| 9 | Térence Joubert (FRA) | 170 |
| 10 | Artem Sedov (RUS) | 162 |

Women
| 1 | Arianna Errigo (ITA) | 334 |
| 2 | Valentina Vezzali (ITA) | 310 |
| 3 | Nam Hyun-hee (KOR) | 228 |
| 4 | Jeon Hee-sook (KOR) | 216 |
| 5 | Elisa Di Francisca (ITA) | 194 |
| 6 | Sylwia Gruchała (POL) | 182 |
| 7 | Aida Shanayeva (RUS) | 182 |
| 8 | Yulia Biryukova (RUS) | 164 |
| 9 | Katja Waechter (GER) | 160 |
| 10 | Gabriella Varga (HUN) | 160 |

== Individual Sabre ==
Men
| 1 | Nicolas Limbach (GER) | 298 |
| 2 | Rareș Dumitrescu (ROU) | 234 |
| 3 | Aldo Montano (ITA) | 222 |
| 4 | Luigi Tarantino (ITA) | 210 |
| 5 | Tamás Decsi (HUN) | 206 |
| 6 | Giampiero Pastore (ITA) | 178 |
| 7 | Nicolas Lopez (FRA) | 166 |
| 8 | Julien Pillet (FRA) | 150 |
| 9 | Aleksey Yakimenko (RUS) | 146 |
| 10 | Jaime Martí (ESP) | 134 |

Women
| 1 | Mariel Zagunis (USA) | 432 |
| 2 | Olha Kharlan (UKR) | 328 |
| 3 | Sofya Velikaya (RUS) | 218 |
| 4 | Ekaterina Dyachenko (RUS) | 210 |
| 5 | Ilaria Bianco (ITA) | 176 |
| 6 | Carole Vergne (FRA) | 152 |
| 7 | Léonore Perrus (FRA) | 150 |
| 8 | Orsolya Nagy (HUN) | 146 |
| 9 | Irene Vecchi (ITA) | 140 |
| 10 | Bogna Jóźwiak (POL) | 130 |

== Team Épée ==
Men
| 1 | Hungary | 356 |
| 2 | France | 340 |
| 3 | Italy | 300 |
| 4 | Germany | 265 |
| 5 | Poland | 254 |
| 6 | Switzerland | 227 |
| 7 | Ukraine | 226 |
| 8 | Russia | 202 |
| 9 | United States | 192 |
| 10 | Venezuela | 177 |

Women
| 1 | Italy | 314 |
| 2 | Poland | 313 |
| 3 | Germany | 304 |
| 4 | France | 288 |
| 5 | Romania | 260 |
| 6 | Russia | 206 |
| 7 | Hungary | 200 |
| 8 | Canada | 199 |
| 9 | United States | 196 |
| 10 | Switzerland | 186 |

== Team Foil ==
Men
| 1 | Italy | 414 |
| 2 | Russia | 292 |
| 3 | Germany | 278 |
| 4 | China | 276 |
| 5 | France | 240 |
| 6 | Great Britain | 240 |
| 7 | Japan | 219 |
| 8 | United States | 212 |
| 9 | Poland | 203 |
| 10 | Canada | 167 |

Women
| 1 | Italy | 384 |
| 2 | Russia | 288 |
| 3 | Germany | 246 |
| 4 | Poland | 202 |
| 5 | France | 182 |
| 6 | China | 172 |
| 7 | United States | 167 |
| 8 | Hungary | 158 |
| 9 | South Korea | 157 |
| 10 | Romania | 147 |

== Team Sabre ==
Men
| 1 | Italy | 272 |
| 2 | Hungary | 244 |
| 3 | Romania | 240 |
| 4 | Belarus | 196 |
| 5 | France | 196 |
| 6 | United States | 180 |
| 7 | Russia | 170 |
| 8 | China | 152 |
| 9 | Germany | 135 |
| 10 | Spain | 130 |

Women
| 1 | Ukraine | 338 |
| 2 | Russia | 304 |
| 3 | United States | 252 |
| 4 | China | 224 |
| 5 | France | 222 |
| 6 | Italy | 208 |
| 7 | Poland | 188 |
| 8 | Hungary | 166 |
| 9 | Canada | 143 |
| 10 | Germany | 137 |
