= Fencing at the 2012 Summer Olympics – Men's sabre =

Men's sabre at the Games of the XXX Olympiad
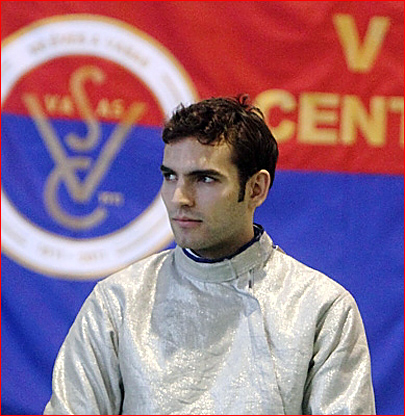
- Áron Szilágyi (2011)
- Venue: ExCeL London Exhibition Centre
- Date: 29 July
- Competitors: 37 from 21 nations

Medalists
1st place, gold medalist(s)		Áron Szilágyi	Hungary
2nd place, silver medalist(s)		Diego Occhiuzzi	Italy
3rd place, bronze medalist(s)		Nikolay Kovalev	Russia

The men's sabre competition in fencing at the 2012 Summer Olympics in London was held on 29 July at the ExCeL London Exhibition Centre. There were 37 competitors from 21 nations. Hungary's Áron Szilágyi won the gold medal, beating Diego Occhiuzzi of Italy won took silver. Nikolay Kovalev from Russia won the bronze. Szilágyi's gold medal was Hungary's 13th in the men's sabre.

== Background ==
This was the 27th appearance of the event, which is the only fencing event to have been held at every Summer Olympics. Three of the quarterfinalists from 2008 returned: gold medalist Zhong Man of China, fifth-place finisher Luigi Tarantino of Italy, and eighth-place finisher Aliaksandr Buikevich of Belarus. The favorite was Nicolas Limbach of Germany, the 2009 world champion and runner-up in both 2010 (to South Korea's Won Woo-young) and 2011 (to Italy's Aldo Montano). Other contenders included Won, Montano (who had won Olympic gold in 2004), Zhong, European champion Aleksey Yakimenko of Russia, and South Korea's Gu Bon-gil.

For the first time in the history of the event, no nations made their debut in the men's sabre. Italy made its 25th appearance in the event, most of any nation, having missed the inaugural 1896 event and the 1904 Games.

== Qualification ==
Nations were limited to three fencers each from 1928 to 2004. However, the 2008 Games introduced a rotation of men's team fencing events with one weapon left off each Games; the individual event without a corresponding team event had the number of fencers per nation reduced to two. The men's rotation started with foil (2008) and épée (2012), with sabre scheduled to skip its team event in 2016. Thus, the maximum for individual sabre in 2012 was three per nation.

There were 36 dedicated quota spots for men's sabre. The first 24 spots went to the 3 members of each of the 8 qualified teams in the team foil event. Next, 7 more men were selected from the world rankings based on continents: 2 from Europe, 2 from the Americas, 2 from Asia/Oceania, and 1 from Africa. Finally, 5 spots were allocated by continental qualifying events: 2 from Europe, 1 from the Americas, 1 from Asia/Oceania, and 1 from Africa.

Additionally, there were 8 host/invitational spots that could be spread throughout the various fencing events. Great Britain chose to use 1 of its 8 host places to include a men's sabreur. This made the total number of fencers in the event 37.

== Competition format ==
The sabre competition consisted of a six-round single-elimination bracket with a bronze medal match between the two semifinal losers. Fencing was done to 15 touches or to the completion of three three-minute rounds if neither fencer reached 15 touches by then. At the end of time, the higher-scoring fencer was the winner; a tie resulted in an additional one-minute sudden-death time period. This sudden-death period was further modified by the selection of a draw-winner beforehand; if neither fencer scored a touch during the minute, the predetermined draw-winner won the bout.

== Schedule ==
All times are British Summer Time (UTC+1)

Date	Time	Round
Sunday, 29 July 2012	9:00	Round of 64; Round of 32; Round of 16; Quarterfinals; Semifinals; Finals

== Results ==
=== Section 1 ===
Round of 64
Lam Hin Chung (HKG)	10
Adam Skrodzki (POL)	15

Round of 32
Nicolas Limbach (GER)	15
Adam Skrodzki (POL)	8
Renzo Agresta (BRA)	6
Benedikt Wagner (GER)	15
Nikolay Kovalev (RUS)	15
James Williams (USA)	12
Wang Jingzhi (CHN)	6
Won Woo-young (KOR)	15

Round of 16
Nicolas Limbach (GER)	15
Benedikt Wagner (GER)	7
Nikolay Kovalev (RUS)	15
Won Woo-young (KOR)	11

Quarter-finals
Nicolas Limbach (GER)	12
Nikolay Kovalev (RUS)	15

=== Section 2 ===
Round of 64
Yu Peng Kean (MAS)	15
Mannad Zeid (EGY)	12
Florin Zalomir (ROU)	15
Mojtaba Abedini (IRI)	7

Round of 32
Áron Szilágyi (HUN)	15
Yu Peng Kean (MAS)	1
Zhong Man (CHN)	15
Kim Jung-hwan (KOR)	14
Luigi Tarantino (ITA)	14
Max Hartung (GER)	15
Florin Zalomir (ROU)	12
Gu Bon-gil (KOR)	15

Round of 16
Áron Szilágyi (HUN)	15
Zhong Man (CHN)	10
Max Hartung (GER)	15
Gu Bon-gil (KOR)	14

Quarter-finals
Áron Szilágyi (HUN)	15
Max Hartung (GER)	13

=== Section 3 ===
Round of 64
James Honeybone (GBR)	9
Valery Pryiemka (BLR)	15

Round of 32
Aldo Montano (ITA)	15
Valery Pryiemka (BLR)	9
Liu Xiao (CHN)	9
Diego Occhiuzzi (ITA)	15
Dmitry Lapkes (BLR)	15
Philippe Beaudry (CAN)	10
Tim Morehouse (USA)	15
Veniamin Reshetnikov (RUS)	6

Round of 16
Aldo Montano (ITA)	13
Diego Occhiuzzi (ITA)	15
Dmitry Lapkes (BLR)	13
Tim Morehouse (USA)	15

Quarter-finals
Diego Occhiuzzi (ITA)	15
Tim Morehouse (USA)	9

=== Section 4 ===
Round of 64
Hicheim Samandi (TUN)	13
Hernán Jansen (VEN)	15

Round of 32
Rareș Dumitrescu (ROU)	15
Dmytro Boyko (UKR)	12
Aliaksandr Buikevich (BLR)	15
Bolade Apithy (FRA)	11
Tiberiu Dolniceanu (ROU)	11
Daryl Homer (USA)	15
Hernán Jansen (VEN)	4
Aleksey Yakimenko (RUS)	15

Round of 16
Rareș Dumitrescu (ROU)	15
Aliaksandr Buikevich (BLR)	6
Daryl Homer (USA)	15
Aleksey Yakimenko (RUS)	14

Quarter-finals
Rareș Dumitrescu (ROU)	15
Daryl Homer (USA)	13

=== Finals ===
Semi-finals
Nikolay Kovalev (RUS)	7
Áron Szilágyi (HUN)	15
Diego Occhiuzzi (ITA)	15
Rareș Dumitrescu (ROU)	11

Final
Áron Szilágyi (HUN)	15
Diego Occhiuzzi (ITA)	8
Bronze medal match
Nikolay Kovalev (RUS)	15
Rareș Dumitrescu (ROU)	10

== Final classification ==
Rank	Fencer	Nation
1st place, gold medalist(s)	Áron Szilágyi	Hungary
2nd place, silver medalist(s)	Diego Occhiuzzi	Italy
3rd place, bronze medalist(s)	Nikolay Kovalev	Russia
4	Rareş Dumitrescu	Romania
5	Nicolas Limbach	Germany
6	Daryl Homer	United States
7	Max Hartung	Germany
8	Tim Morehouse	United States
9	Aleksey Yakimenko	Russia
10	Gu Bon-Gil	South Korea
11	Aldo Montano	Italy
12	Won Woo-young	South Korea
13	Dmitry Lapkes	Belarus
14	Benedikt Wagner	Germany
15	Zhong Man	China
16	Aliaksandr Buikevich	Belarus
17	Veniamin Reshetnikov	Russia
18	Bolade Apithy	France
19	Kim Jung-hwan	South Korea
20	Luigi Tarantino	Italy
21	Tiberiu Dolniceanu	Romania
22	Renzo Agresta	Brazil
23	Liu Xiao	China
24	Philippe Beaudry	Canada
25	James Williams	United States
26	Dmytro Boyko	Ukraine
27	Wang Jingzhi	China
28	Valery Pryiemka	Belarus
29	Florin Zalomir	Romania
30	Adam Skrodzki	Poland
31	Hernán Jansen	Venezuela
32	Yu Peng Kean	Malaysia
33	Mannad Zeid	Egypt
34	Hichem Samandi	Tunisia
35	Lam Hin Chung	Hong Kong
36	James Honeybone	Great Britain
37	Mojtaba Abedini	Iran
