= 2009 World Fencing Championships =

International fencing competition

2009 World Championships in Fencing
- Dates: September 30 – October 8
- Host city: Antalya, Turkey

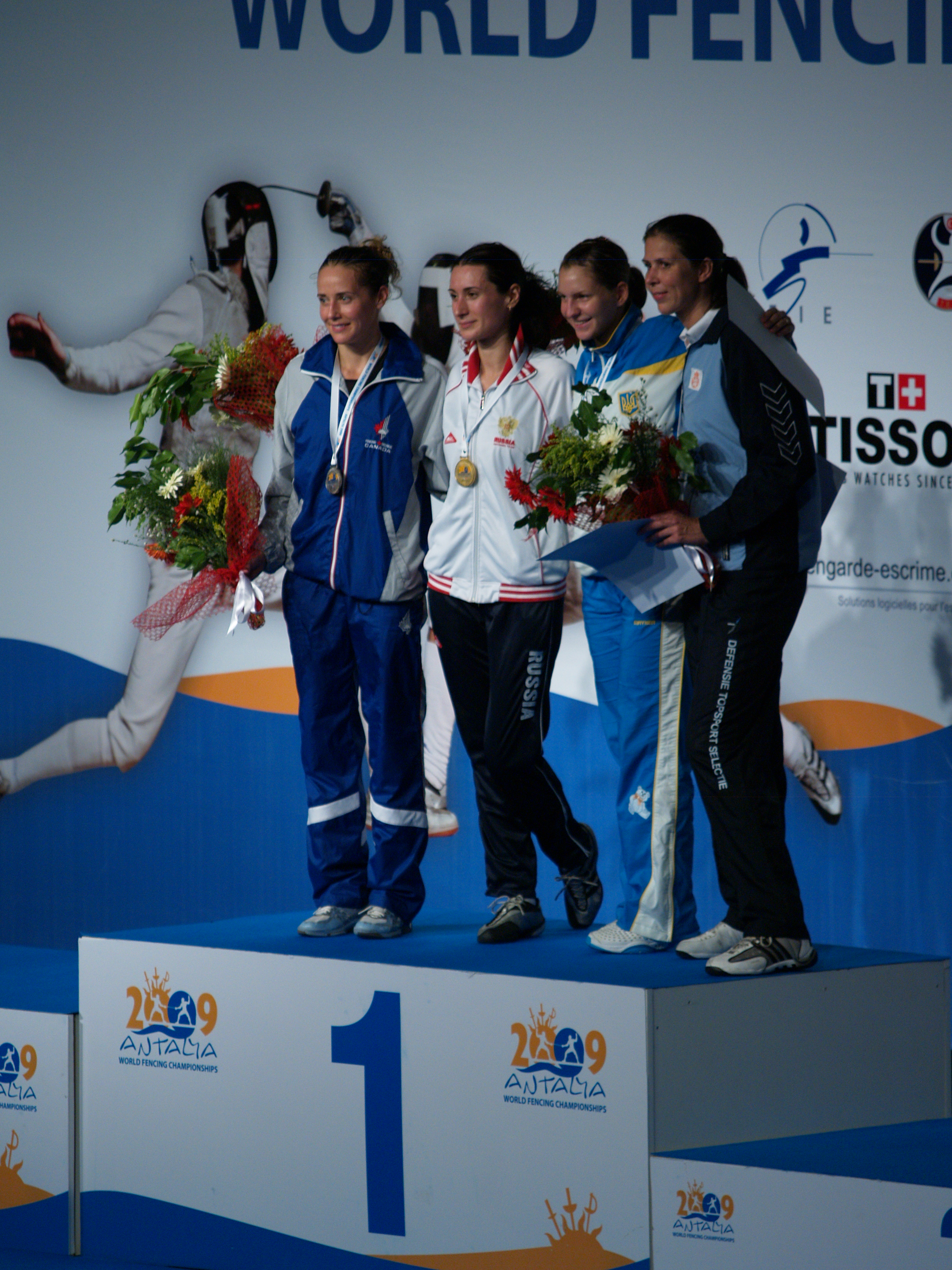
2009 World Fencing championship medalists (épée). Left to right: Sherraine Schalm (CAN, silver), Lyubov Shutova (RUS, gold), Anfisa Pochkalova (UKR, bronze), Sonja Tol (NED, bronze)

2009 World Fencing Championships was held at the Antalya Expo Center in Antalya, Turkey. The event took place from September 30 to October 8, 2009.

== Medal summary ==
=== Men's events ===
Event	(gold) Gold	(silver) Silver	(bronze) Bronze
Foil	Andrea Baldini (ITA)	Zhu Jun (CHN)	Peter Joppich (GER); Artem Sedov (RUS)
Épée	Anton Avdeev (RUS)	Matteo Tagliariol (ITA)	José Luis Abajo (ESP); Jérôme Jeannet (FRA)
Sabre	Nicolas Limbach (GER)	Rareș Dumitrescu (ROU)	Tamás Decsi (HUN); Luigi Tarantino (ITA)
Team Foil	Italy	Germany	Russia
Team Épée	France	Hungary	Poland
Team Sabre	Romania	Italy	Hungary

=== Women's events ===
Event	(gold) Gold	(silver) Silver	(bronze) Bronze
Sabre	Mariel Zagunis (USA)	Olha Kharlan (UKR)	Carole Vergne (FRA); Orsolya Nagy (HUN)
Foil	Aida Shanayeva (RUS)	Jeon Hee-sook (KOR)	Arianna Errigo (ITA); Elisa Di Francisca (ITA)
Épée	Lyubov Shutova (RUS)	Sherraine Schalm (CAN)	Sonja Tol (NED); Anfisa Pochkalova (UKR)
Team Sabre	Ukraine	France	China
Team Foil	Italy	Russia	Germany
Team Épée	Italy	Poland	Germany

== Medal table ==
Rank	Nation	Gold	Silver	Bronze	Total
1	Italy (ITA)	4	2	3	9
2	Russia (RUS)	3	1	2	6
3	Germany (GER)	1	1	3	5
4	France (FRA)	1	1	2	4
5	Ukraine (UKR)	1	1	1	3
6	Romania (ROU)	1	1	0	2
7	United States (USA)	1	0	0	1
8	Hungary (HUN)	0	1	3	4
9	China (CHN)	0	1	1	2
9	Poland (POL)	0	1	1	2
11	Canada (CAN)	0	1	0	1
11	South Korea (KOR)	0	1	0	1
13	Netherlands (NED)	0	0	1	1
13	Spain (ESP)	0	0	1	1
Totals (14 entries)		12	12	18	42

== Results overview ==
=== Men ===
==== Foil individual ====
3 October - Final

Position	Name	Country
1.	Andrea Baldini	Italy
2.	Zhu Jun	China
3.	Peter Joppich	Germany
3.	Artem Sedov	Russia
5.	Andrea Cassarà	Italy
6.	Radosław Glonek	Poland
7.	Kurt Getz	United States
8.	Shi Jialuo	China

Quarter-finals
(Germany) Peter Joppich	15
(Poland) Radosław Glonek	14
(China) Zhu Jun	15
(United States) Kurt Getz	5
(Italy) Andrea Cassarà	14
(Italy) Andrea Baldini	15
(China) Shi Jialuo	7
(Russia) Artem Sedov	15

Semi-finals
(Germany) Peter Joppich	11
(China) Zhu Jun	15
(Italy) Andrea Baldini	15
(Russia) Artem Sedov	6

Final
(China) Zhu Jun	11
(Italy) Andrea Baldini	15

==== Épée individual ====
4 October - Final

Position	Name	Country
1.	Anton Avdeev	Russia
2.	Matteo Tagliariol	Italy
3.	José Luis Abajo	Spain
3.	Jérôme Jeannet	France
5.	Joaquim Videira	Portugal
6.	Guillermo Madrigal Sardinas	Cuba
7.	Krzysztof Mikołajczak	Poland
8.	Seung Hwa-jung	South Korea

Quarter-finals
(Cuba) Guillermo Madrigal Sardinas	14
(Spain) José Luis Abajo	15
(South Korea) Seung Hwa-jung	10
(Russia) Anton Avdeev	15
(Portugal) Joaquim Videira	13
(Italy) Matteo Tagliariol	15
(Poland) Krzysztof Mikołajczak	10
(France) Jérôme Jeannet	15

Semi-finals
(Spain) José Luis Abajo	6
(Russia) Anton Avdeev	15
(Italy) Matteo Tagliariol	15
(France) Jérôme Jeannet	11

Final
(Russia) Anton Avdeev	15
(Italy) Matteo Tagliariol	14

==== Sabre individual ====
5 October - Final

Position	Name	Country
1.	Nicolas Limbach	Germany
2.	Rareș Dumitrescu	Romania
3.	Luigi Tarantino	Italy
3.	Tamás Decsi	Hungary
5.	Aldo Montano	Italy
6.	Florin Zalomir	Romania
7.	Oh Eun-seok	South Korea
8.	Vladimir Lukashenko	Ukraine

Quarter-finals
(Germany) Nicolas Limbach	15
(South Korea) Oh Eun-seok	10
(Italy) Luigi Tarantino	15
(Ukraine) Vladimir Lukashenko	12
(Italy) Aldo Montano	14
(Romania) Rareș Dumitrescu	15
(Hungary) Tamás Decsi	15
(Romania) Florin Zalomir	13

Semi-finals
(Germany) Nicolas Limbach	15
(Italy) Luigi Tarantino	9
(Romania) Rareș Dumitrescu	15
(Hungary) Tamás Decsi	10

Final
(Germany) Nicolas Limbach	15
(Romania) Rareș Dumitrescu	11

==== Foil team ====
6 October - Final

Position	Country	Name
1.	Italy	Andrea Baldini; Andrea Cassarà; Stefano Barrera; Simone Vanni
2.	Germany	Peter Joppich; Benjamin Kleibrink; André Weßels; Sebastian Bachmann
3.	Russia	Aleksandr Stukalin; Artem Sedov; Renal Ganeev; Aleksey Khovanskiy
4.	China	Zhu Jun; Jialuo Shi; Liangcai Huang; Lei Sheng
5.	Japan	Yuki Ota; Yusuke Fukuda; Kyoya Ichikawa; Kenta Chiwa
6.	United Kingdom	Richard Kruse; Jamie Kenber; Laurence Halsted; Edward Jefferies
7.	France	Gregory Koenig; Brice Guyart; Erwann Le Péchoux; Térence Joubert
8.	Poland	Radosław Glonek; Sławomir Mocek; Tomasz Ciepły; Marcin Zawada

Quarter-finals
Italy	45
Japan	35
France	33
China	34
Germany	45
Poland	37
United Kingdom	33
Russia	34

Semi-finals
Italy	35
China	34
Germany	42
Russia	40

Final
Italy	45
Germany	41
Third place
China	31
Russia	40

==== Epée team ====
7 October - Final

Position	Country	Name
1.	France	Jérôme Jeannet; Ulrich Robeiri; Jean-Michel Lucenay; Gauthier Grumier
2.	Hungary	Péter Somfai; András Rédli; Géza Imre; Gábor Boczkó
3.	Poland	Krzysztof Mikołajczak; Tomasz Motyka; Radosław Zawrotniak; Adam Wiercioch
4.	Germany	Jörg Fiedler; Christoph Kneip; Martin Schmitt; Sven Schmid
5.	Switzerland	Max Heinzer; Fabian Kauter; Michael Kauter; Benjamin Steffen
6.	South Korea	Jung Jin-sun; Jung Seung-hwa; Kim Won-jin; Park Kyoung-doo
7.	Italy	Diego Confalonieri; Francesco Martinelli; Alfredo Rota; Matteo Tagliariol
8.	Ukraine	Igor Reyzlin; Bohdan Nikishyn; Vitaly Medvedev; Maksym Khvorost

Quarter-finals
France	45
Switzerland	41
Ukraine	21
Poland	22
Hungary	45
South Korea	33
Germany	45
Italy	39

Semi-finals
France	45
Poland	30
Hungary	45
Germany	38

Final
France	45
Hungary	41
Third place
Poland	23
Germany	22

==== Sabre team ====
8 October - Final

Position	Country	Name
1.	Romania	Rareș Dumitrescu; Florin Zalomir; Tiberiu Dolniceanu; Cosmin Hănceanu
2.	Italy	Aldo Montano; Luigi Tarantino; Diego Occhiuzzi; Giampiero Pastore
3.	Hungary	Tamás Decsi; Nikolász Iliász; Balázs Lontay; Áron Szilágyi
4.	Russia	Vardan Kosikov; Nikolay Kovalev; Ilia Mokretsov; Veniamin Reshetnikov
5.	China	He Wei; Ke Lu Jiang; Liu Xiao; Zhong Man
6.	Belarus	Dmitri Lapkes; Aliaksei Likhacheuski; Aliaksandr Buikevich; Valery Pryiemka
7.	United States	Daryl Homer; Benjamin Igoe; Timothy Morehouse; James Williams
8.	France	Boris Sanson; Julien Pillet; Nicolas Lopez; Vincent Anstett

Quarter-finals
France	41
Romania	45
Belarus	44
Hungary	45
United States	32
Russia	45
China	44
Italy	45

Semi-finals
Romania	45
Hungary	29
Russia	43
Italy	45

Final
Romania	45
Italy	44
Third place
Hungary	45
Russia	44

=== Women ===
==== Sabre individual ====
3 October - Final

Position	Name	Country
1.	Mariel Zagunis	United States
2.	Olha Kharlan	Ukraine
3.	Carole Vergne	France
3.	Orsolya Nagy	Hungary
5.	Sofiya Velikaya	Russia
6.	Yekaterina Dyachenko	Russia
7.	Olena Khomrova	Ukraine
8.	Bogna Jóźwiak	Poland

Quarter-finals
(United States) Mariel Zagunis	15
(Ukraine) Olena Khomrova	8
(France) Carole Vergne	15
(Russia) Yekaterina Dyachenko	6
(Russia) Sophia Velikaia	9
(Hungary) Orsolya Nagy	15
(Poland) Bogna Jóźwiak	7
(Ukraine) Olha Kharlan	15

Semi-finals
(United States) Mariel Zagunis	15
(France) Carole Vergne	12
(Hungary) Orsolya Nagy	7
(Ukraine) Olha Kharlan	15

Final
(United States) Mariel Zagunis	15
(Ukraine) Olha Kharlan	6

==== Foil individual ====
4 October - Final

Position	Name	Country
1.	Aida Shanayeva	Russia
2.	Jeon Hee-sook	South Korea
3.	Arianna Errigo	Italy
3.	Elisa Di Francisca	Italy
5.	Valentina Vezzali	Italy
6.	Yuliya Biryukova	Russia
7.	Larisa Korobeynikova	Russia
8.	Astrid Guyart	France

Quarter-finals
(Russia) Larisa Korobeynikova	4
(South Korea) Jeon Hee-sook	15
(France) Astrid Guyart	10
(Italy) Arianna Errigo	15
(Russia) Aida Shanayeva	15
(Russia) Yuliya Biryukova	4
(Italy) Elisa Di Francisca	15
(Italy) Valentina Vezzali	10

Semi-finals
(South Korea) Jeon Hee-sook	15
(Italy) Arianna Errigo	11
(Russia) Aida Shanayeva	15
(Italy) Elisa Di Francisca	6

Final
(South Korea) Jeon Hee-sook	11
(Russia) Aida Shanayeva	12

==== Epée individual ====
5 October - Final

Position	Name	Country
1.	Lyubov Shutova	Russia
2.	Sherraine Schalm	Canada
3.	Anfisa Pochkalova	Ukraine
3.	Sonja Tol	Netherlands
5.	Britta Heidemann	Germany
6.	Laura Flessel-Colovic	France
7.	Anqi Xu	China
8.	Danuta Dmowska-Andrzejuk	Poland

Quarter-finals
(Germany) Britta Heidemann	12
(Ukraine) Anfisa Pochkalova	15
(Russia) Lyubov Shutova	8
(France) Laura Flessel-Colovic	7
(China) Anqi Xu	12
(Netherlands) Sonja Tol	15
(Poland) Danuta Dmowska-Andrzejuk	10
(Canada) Sherraine Schalm	11

Semi-finals
(Ukraine) Anfisa Pochkalova	3
(Russia) Lubov Shutova	15
(Netherlands) Sonja Tol	11
(Canada) Sherraine Schalm	15

Final
(Russia) Lyubov Shutova	9
(Canada) Sherraine Schalm	8

==== Sabre team ====
6 October - Final

Position	Country	Name
1.	Ukraine	Olha Kharlan; Olena Khomrova; Olha Zhovnir; Halyna Pundyk
2.	France	Cécilia Berder; Léonore Perrus; Carole Vergne; Mary Solenne
3.	China	Bao Yingying; Li Fei; Ni Hong; Chen Xiaodong
4.	Russia	Svetlana Kormilitsyna; Sofiya Velikaya; Yekaterina Dyachenko; Yuliya Gavrilova
5.	Italy	Ilaria Bianco; Livia Stagni; Gioia Marzocca; Irene Vecchi
6.	United States	Daria Schneider; Monica Aksamit; Dagmara Wozniak; Mariel Zagunis
7.	Poland	Bogna Jóźwiak; Katarzyna Kędziora; Aleksandra Socha; Irena Więckowska
8.	Germany	Anna Limbach; Stefanie Kubissa; Alexandra Bujdoso; Sibylle Klemm

Quarter-finals
Ukraine	45
Italy	39
Poland	30
China	45
United States	34
France	45
Germany	36
Russia	45

Semi-finals
Ukraine	45
China	34
France	45
Russia	43

Final
Ukraine	45
France	38
Third place
China	45
Russia	41

==== Foil team ====
7 October - Final

Position	Country	Name
1.	Italy	Valentina Vezzali; Margherita Granbassi; Arianna Errigo; Elisa Di Francisca
2.	Russia	Aida Shanayeva; Larisa Korobeynikova; Yuliya Biryukova; Kamilla Gafurzianova
3.	Germany	Maria Bartkowski; Katja Waechter; Anja Schache; Carolin Golubytskyi
4.	Romania	Andreea Andrei; Cristina Stahl; Cristina Ghiță; Maria Udrea
5.	China	Jinyan Chen; Huili Dai; Yun Shi; Wan Wen Su
6.	South Korea	Jeon Hee-sook; Jung Gil-ok; Nam Hyun-hee; Seo Mi-jung
7.	United States	Ambika Singh; Doris Willette; Lee Kiefer; Nzingha Prescod
8.	Ukraine	Kateryna Chentsova; Olena Khismatulina; Olga Leleyko; Anastasiya Moskovska

Quarter-finals
Italy	45
South Korea	35
Romania	35
United States	23
Germany	35
Ukraine	23
China	39
Russia	45

Semi-finals
Italy	45
Romania	37
Germany	35
Russia	36

Final
Italy	45
Russia	33
Third place
Romania	30
Germany	42

==== Épée team ====
8 October - Final

Position	Country	Name
1.	Italy	Francesca Quondamcarlo; Cristiana Cascioli; Bianca Del Carretto; Nathalie Moellhausen
2.	Poland	Danuta Dmowska-Andrzejuk; Małgorzata Bereza; Magdalena Piekarska; Ewa Nelip
3.	Germany	Imke Duplitzer; Britta Heidemann; Marijana Markovic; Monika Sozanska
4.	France	Laura Flessel-Colovic; Maureen Nisima; Hajnalka Kiraly Picot; Vanessa Galantine
5.	Russia	Lyubov Shutova; Tatiana Logunova; Yana Zvereva; Olga Kochneva
6.	Romania	Simona Alexandru; Ana Maria Brânză; Anca Măroiu; Iuliana Măceșeanu
7.	Hungary	Emese Szász; Emese Takács; Hajnalka Tóth; Katalin Izsó
8.	China	Cao Yulian; Luo Xiaojuan; Sun Yujie; Xu Anqi

Quarter-finals
France	38
Hungary	33
Italy	32
Romania	31
Poland	18
China	17
Russia	21
Germany	22

Semi-finals
France	28
Italy	29
Poland	29
Germany	28

Final
Italy	45
Poland	31
Third place
Germany	45
France	35

== See also ==
- Fencing at the 2008 Summer Olympics
