= Mannad Zeid =

Egyptian fencer

Mannad Zeid (1 October 1989, Alexandria) is an Egyptian fencer. At the 2012 Summer Olympics, he competed in the men's sabre, but was defeated in the first round. He qualified for the Olympics by winning the African Championships.
