= Andriy Yahodka =

Ukrainian fencer (born 1988)

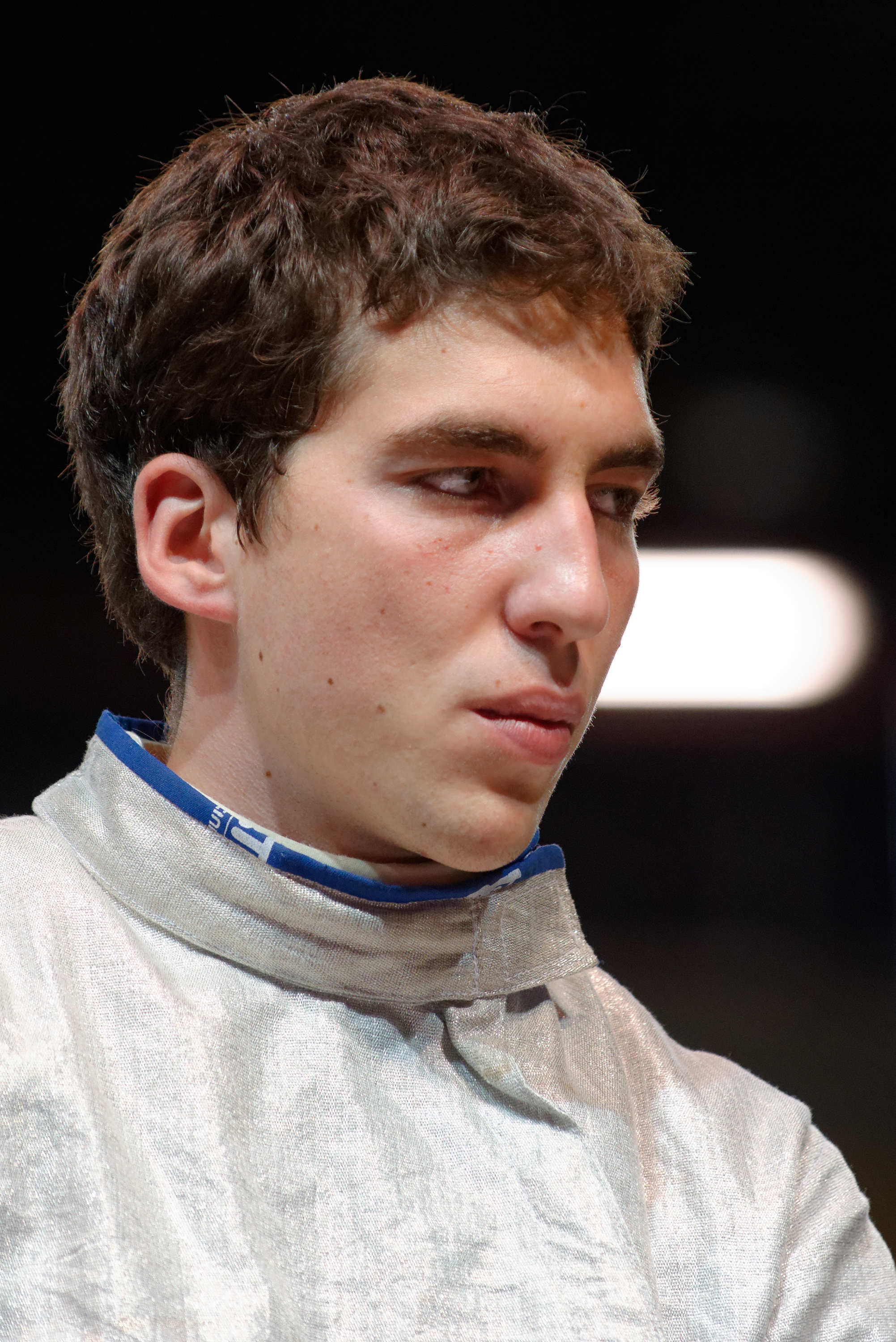

Personal information
- Born: 6 July 1988 (age 38) Odessa, Ukrainian SSR, Soviet Union
- Height: 1.95 m (6 ft 5 in)
- Weight: 85 kg (187 lb)

Fencing career
- Sport: Fencing
- Country: Ukraine
- Weapon: Sabre
- Hand: Right-handed
- National coach: Vadim Gutzeit
- Club: CSK ZSU
- FIE ranking: current ranking
Medal record
Men's sabre fencing
Representing Ukraine
European Games
Gold medal – first place	2015 Baku	Individual
European Championships
Silver medal – second place	2010 Leipzig	Team
Silver medal – second place	2022 Antalya	Team
Bronze medal – third place	2012 Legnano	Individual
Bronze medal – third place	2013 Zagreb	Team
Universiade
Gold medal – first place	2007 Bangkok	Team
Gold medal – first place	2011 Shenzhen	Individual
Gold medal – first place	2011 Shenzhen	Team
Military Games
Bronze medal – third place	2019 Wuhan	Team

Andriy Yahodka (also spelled Yagodka, Ukrainian: Андрій Ягодка; born 6 July 1988) is a Ukrainian sabre fencer, bronze medal in the 2012 European Fencing Championships and team silver medal in the 2009 European Fencing Championships. In the 2014–15 season he posted his first World Cup medal with a silver in Padova after being defeated in the final by Russia's Kamil Ibragimov.
