= Gymnastics at the 2012 Summer Olympics – Women's floor =

Women's floor at the Games of the XXX Olympiad
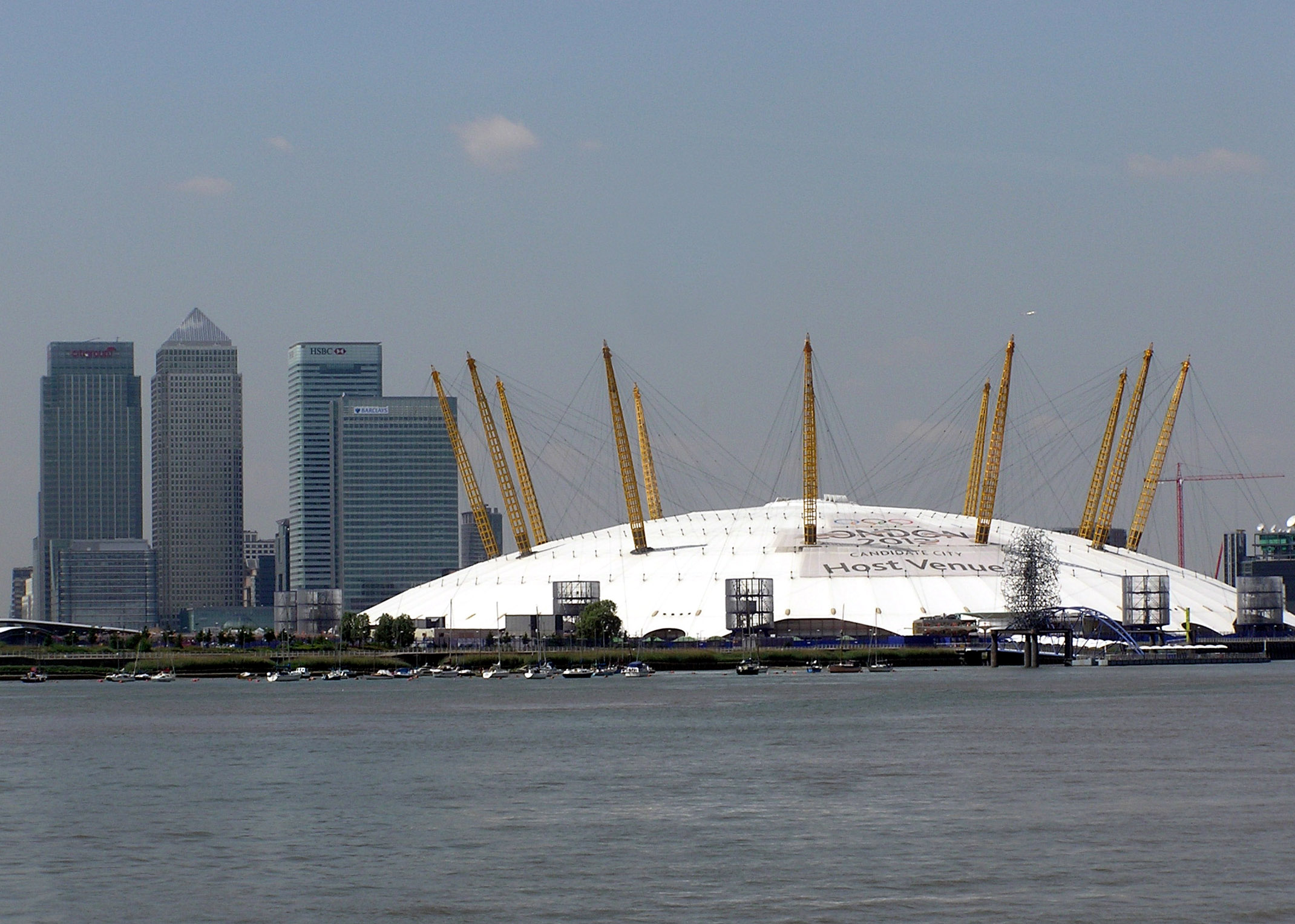
- Canary wharf and dome London
- Venue: North Greenwich Arena
- Date: 7 August 2012
- Competitors: 8 from 5 nations
- Winning points: 15.600

Medalists
| 1st place, gold medalist(s) | | Aly Raisman | United States |
| 2nd place, silver medalist(s) | | Cătălina Ponor | Romania |
| 3rd place, bronze medalist(s) | | Aliya Mustafina | Russia |

The women's floor competition at the 2012 Summer Olympics in London was held at the North Greenwich Arena on 7 August.

== Format of competition ==
The top eight competitors in the qualification phase (with a limit of two per country) advanced to the final. Qualification scores were then ignored, with only final-round scores counting.

== Final results ==
| Rank | Gymnast | Nation | D Score | E Score | Pen. | Total |
|---|---|---|---|---|---|---|
| 1st place, gold medalist(s) | Aly Raisman | United States | 6.500 | 9.100 | | 15.600 |
| 2nd place, silver medalist(s) | Cătălina Ponor | Romania | 6.200 | 9.000 | | 15.200 |
| 3rd place, bronze medalist(s) | Aliya Mustafina | Russia | 5.900 | 9.000 | | 14.900 |
| 4 | Vanessa Ferrari | Italy | 6.200 | 8.700 | | 14.900 |
| 5 | Lauren Mitchell | Australia | 6.400 | 8.433 | | 14.833 |
| 6 | Ksenia Afanasyeva | Russia | 6.100 | 8.666 | 0.20 | 14.566 |
| 7 | Jordyn Wieber | United States | 6.100 | 8.500 | 0.10 | 14.500 |
| 8 | Sandra Izbașa | Romania | 5.600 | 8.033 | 0.30 | 13.333 |

== Qualification results ==
Oldest and youngest competitors

| | Name | Country | Date of birth | Age |
|---|---|---|---|---|
| Youngest | Jordyn Wieber | United States | 12 July 1995 | 17 years |
| Oldest | Cătălina Ponor | Romania | 20 August 1987 | 24 years |

| Rank | Gymnast | Nation | D Score | E Score | Pen. | Total | Qual. |
|---|---|---|---|---|---|---|---|
| 1 | Aly Raisman | United States | 6.500 | 8.825 | | 15.325 | Q |
| 2 | Sandra Izbașa | Romania | 6.300 | 8.766 | | 15.066 | Q |
| 3 | Vanessa Ferrari | Italy | 6.200 | 8.700 | | 14.900 | Q |
| 4 | Ksenia Afanasyeva | Russia | 5.900 | 8.933 | | 14.833 | Q |
| 5 | Lauren Mitchell | Australia | 6.300 | 8.533 | | 14.833 | Q |
| 6 | Jordyn Wieber | United States | 6.000 | 8.766 | 0.10 | 14.666 | Q |
| 7 | Cătălina Ponor | Romania | 5.900 | 8.700 | | 14.600 | Q |
| 8 | Aliya Mustafina | Russia | 5.900 | 8.633 | 0.10 | 14.433 | Q |
| 9 | Beth Tweddle | Great Britain | 5.800 | 8.633 | | 14.433 | R |
| 10 | Diana Chelaru | Romania | 6.000 | 8.633 | 0.30 | 14.333 | - |
| 11 | Marta Pihan-Kulesza | Poland | 5.900 | 8.433 | | 14.333 | R |
| 12 | Asuka Teramoto | Japan | 5.500 | 8.733 | | 14.233 | R |
