= Shooting at the 2012 Summer Olympics – Women's skeet =

Women's skeet at the Games of the XXX Olympiad
- Venue: Royal Artillery Barracks
- Date: 29 July 2012
- Competitors: 17 from 17 nations
- Winning Score: 99

Medalists
1st place, gold medalist(s)		Kim Rhode	United States
2nd place, silver medalist(s)		Wei Ning	China
3rd place, bronze medalist(s)		Danka Barteková	Slovakia

The Women's skeet event at the 2012 Olympic Games took place on 29 July 2012 at the Royal Artillery Barracks.

The event consisted of two rounds: a qualifier and a final. In the qualifier, each shooter fired 3 sets of 25 shots in the set order of skeet shooting.

The top 6 shooters in the qualifying round moved on to the final round. There, they fired one additional round of 25. The total score from all 100 shots was used to determine final ranking. Ties are broken using a shoot-off; additional shots are fired one at a time until there is no longer a tie.

== Records ==
Prior to this competition, the existing world and Olympic records were as follows.

Qualification records
World record	Kim Rhode (USA)	75	Tucson, United States	25 March 2012
Olympic record	Chiara Cainero (ITA)	72	Beijing, China	14 August 2008

Final records
World record	Danka Barteková (SVK)	99 (74+25)	Nicosia, Cyprus	9 July 2008
Olympic record	Chiara Cainero (ITA); Kim Rhode (USA); Christine Brinker (GER)	93 (72+21); 93 (70+23); 93 (70+23)	Beijing, China	14 August 2008

== Qualification round ==
Rank	Athlete	Country	1	2	3	Tie Break	Total	Notes
1	Kim Rhode	United States	25	25	24		74	Q, OR
2	Danka Barteková	Slovakia	25	22	23		70	Q
3	Marina Belikova	Russia	24	23	22		69	Q
4	Wei Ning	China	24	19	25		68	Q
5	Christine Wenzel	Germany	22	23	23		68	Q
6	Chiara Cainero	Italy	22	21	24	2	67	Q
7	Therese Lundqvist	Sweden	22	22	23	1	67	
8	Francisca Crovetto	Chile	22	22	22		66	
9	Angelina Michshuk	Kazakhstan	22	22	22		66	
10	Veronique Girardet	France	22	23	21		66	
11	Sutiya Jiewchaloemmit	Thailand	20	23	22		65	
12	Lucia Liliana Mihalache	Romania	25	20	20		65	
13	Çiğdem Özyaman	Turkey	23	20	20		63	
14	Elena Allen	Great Britain	20	20	20		60	
15	Lauryn Mark	Australia	17	22	20		59	
16	Panagiota Andreou	Cyprus	15	22	20		57	
17	Mona El-Hawary	Egypt	14	20	17		51	

== Final ==
Rank	Athlete	Country	QF	Final	Total	Bronze Medal Tie Break	Notes
1st place, gold medalist(s)	Kim Rhode	United States	74	25	99		=WR, OR
2nd place, silver medalist(s)	Wei Ning	China	68	23	91		
3rd place, bronze medalist(s)	Danka Barteková	Slovakia	70	20	90	4	
4	Marina Belikova	Russia	69	21	90	3	
5	Chiara Cainero	Italy	67	22	89		
6	Christine Wenzel	Germany	68	21	89		
