= Marina Belikova =

Russian skeet shooter

Personal information
- Full name: Marina Viktorovna Belikova
- Nationality: Russia
- Born: 24 November 1985 (age 40) Rostov-on-Don, Russian SFSR
- Height: 1.73 m (5 ft 8 in)
- Weight: 58 kg (128 lb)

Sport
- Sport: Shooting
- Event: Skeet
- Club: Russian Shooting Union
- Coached by: Oleg Tishin
Medal record
Military World Games
Silver medal – second place	2019 Wuhan	Skeet team

Marina Viktorovna Belikova (Russian: Марина Викторовна Беликова; born November 24, 1985, in Rostov-on-Don) is a Russian sport shooter. She won a silver medal in the women's skeet at the 2011 European Shooting Championships in Belgrade, Serbia, accumulating a score of 96 targets. Belikova is also a member of the Russian Shooting Union, and is coached and trained by Oleg Tishin.

Belikova represented Russia at the 2012 Summer Olympics in London, where she competed in the women's skeet. She had finished on exactly the same score of 90 targets (69 in the preliminary rounds and 21 in the final) as Slovakia's Danka Barteková, but narrowly lost the bronze medal shoot-off by one point for a bonus of three.
