= Fencing at the 2012 Summer Olympics – Men's team sabre =

Men's team sabre at the Games of the XXX Olympiad
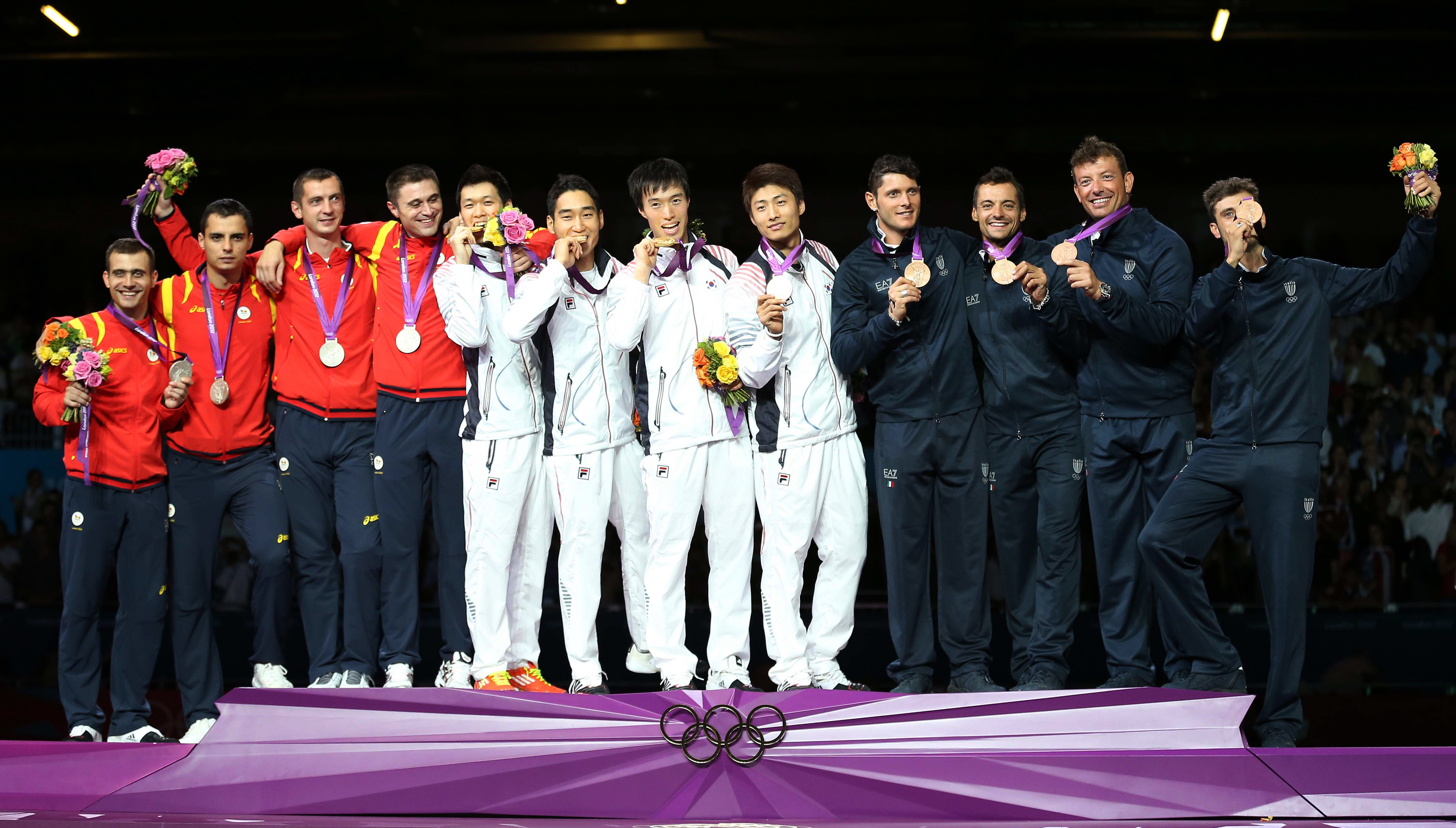
- Medal winners on the podium
- Venue: ExCeL Exhibition Centre
- Date: 3 August
- Competitors: 31 from 8 nations

Medalists
1st place, gold medalist(s)		Gu Bon-gil; Won Woo-young; Kim Jung-hwan; Oh Eun-seok	South Korea
2nd place, silver medalist(s)		Rareș Dumitrescu; Tiberiu Dolniceanu; Florin Zalomir; Alexandru Sirițeanu	Romania
3rd place, bronze medalist(s)		Diego Occhuizzi; Aldo Montano; Luigi Samele; Luigi Tarantino	Italy

The men's team sabre competition in fencing at the 2012 Olympic Games in London was held on 3 August at the ExCeL Exhibition Centre.

== Competition format ==
This team event featured eight national teams. Great Britain, as hosts were allowed to enter a team in any event they chose, however they chose not to enter this event. First round losers continued fencing to determine ranking spots for fifth through eighth, while the quarter-final winners met in the semi-finals. The winners of the semi-final bouts competed for the gold medal, while the losing teams competed for the bronze.

Team events competed to a maximum of 45 touches.

== Schedule ==
All times are British Summer Time (UTC+1)

Date	Time	Round
Friday, 3 August 2012	09:00	Qualifications and finals

== Draw ==
=== Finals ===
Quarter-finals
1	Russia	45
8	United States	33
5	China	30
4	Romania	45
3	Germany	38
6	South Korea	45
7	Italy	45
2	Belarus	44

Semi-finals
1	Russia	43
4	Romania	45
6	South Korea	45
7	Italy	37

Finals
4	Romania	26
6	South Korea	45
Third place
1	Russia	40
7	Italy	45

=== Classification 5–8 ===
Placement 5–8
8	United States	28
5	China	45
3	Germany	45
2	Belarus	40

Placement 5–6
5	China	30
3	Germany	45
Placement 7–8
8	United States	35
2	Belarus	45

== Final classification ==
Rank	Team	Athlete
1st place, gold medalist(s)	South Korea	Gu Bon-gil; Kim Jung-hwan; Won Woo-young; Oh Eun-seok
2nd place, silver medalist(s)	Romania	Tiberiu Dolniceanu; Rareș Dumitrescu; Florin Zalomir; Alexandru Sirițeanu
3rd place, bronze medalist(s)	Italy	Aldo Montano; Diego Occhiuzzi; Luigi Tarantino; Luigi Samele
4	Russia	Nikolay Kovalev; Veniamin Reshetnikov; Aleksey Yakimenko
5	Germany	Max Hartung; Nicolas Limbach; Benedikt Wagner; Björn Hübner
6	China	Liu Xiao; Wang Jingzhi; Zhong Man; Jiang Kelü
7	Belarus	Aliaksandr Buikevich; Dmitry Lapkes; Valery Pryiemka; Aliaksei Likhacheuski
8	United States	Daryl Homer; Tim Morehouse; James Leighman Williams; Jeff Spear
