= Artyom Sedov =

Russian foil fencer

Artem Sedov
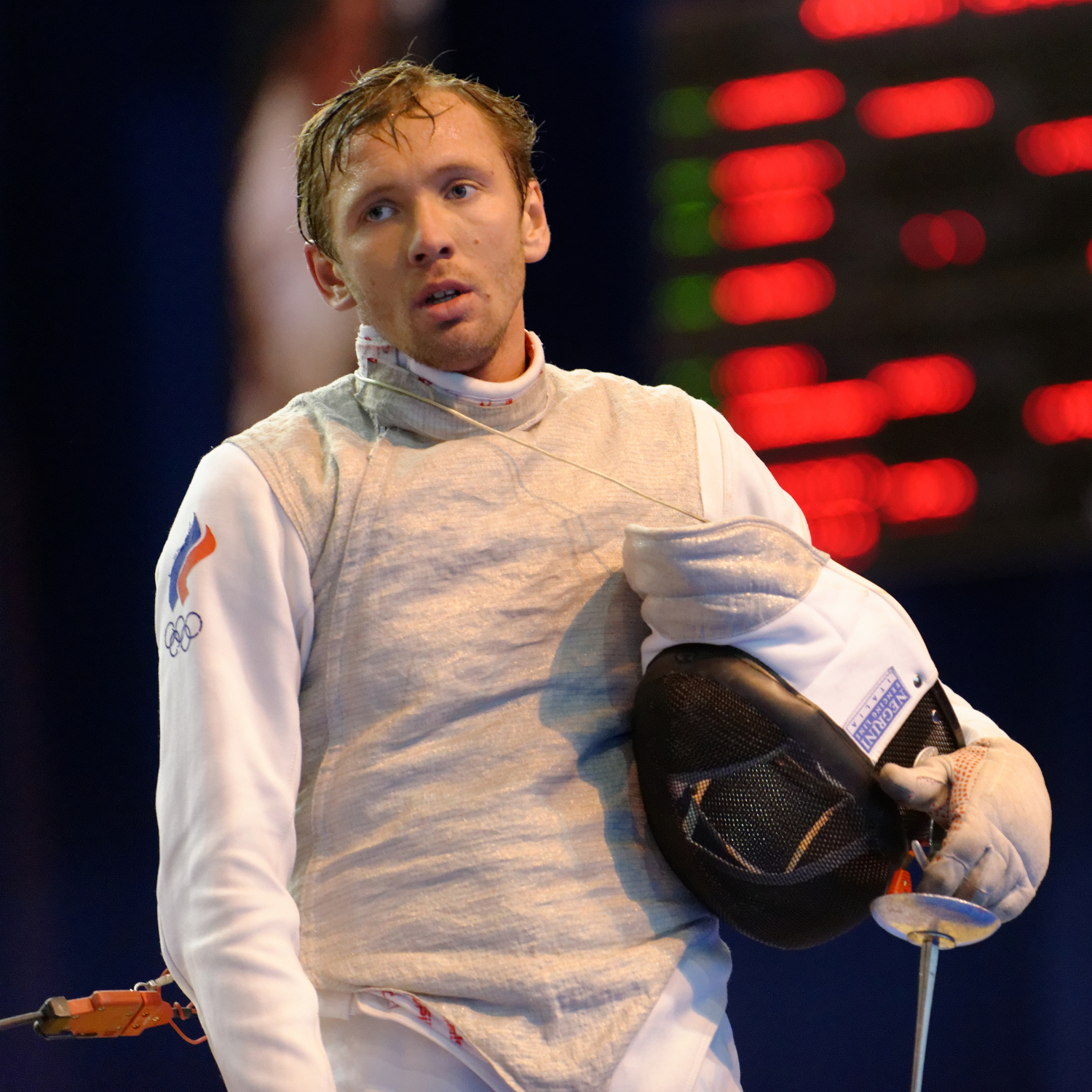
- At the 2013 Paris World Cup

Personal information
- Full name: Artyom Anatolevich Sedov
- Born: 26 March 1984 (age 42) Saint-Petersburg, Russia
- Height: 1.82 m (6 ft 0 in)
- Weight: 76 kg (168 lb)

Fencing career
- Sport: Fencing
- Country: Russia
- Weapon: Foil
- Hand: Left-handed
- National coach: Stefano Cerioni
- Club: SKA Saint Petersburg
- FIE ranking: current ranking
Medal record
Men's foil fencing
Representing Russia
World Championships
Bronze medal – third place	2009 Antalya	Individual foil
Bronze medal – third place	2009 Antalya	Team foil
European Championships
Silver medal – second place	2005 Zalaegerszeg	Team foil
Bronze medal – third place	2011 Sheffield	Team foil

Artyom Anatolevich Sedov (Russian: Артём Анатольевич Седов; born 26 March 1984) is a Russian former foil fencer, who earned a bronze medal in the individual and team events of the 2009 World Championships at Antalya.
