= Martin Singer =

American attorney

Martin D. Singer (born 1952) is an American attorney. Considered to be one of Hollywood's foremost and widely recognized lawyers, he has been described as "Hollywood's favorite legal hit man" and the "bane of studio chiefs and tabloid editors" and is recognized as a significant figure in the realm of celebrity legal matters.

Singer is known for his robust "headline-snuffing" approach, earning him the nickname "Mad Dog Marty" and the "Legal Pit Bull." Employing tactics such as cease-and-desist letters and legal warnings, he is recognized for his assertive efforts to curtail negative media coverage and address accusations.

Singer has represented clients including Sylvester Stallone, Scarlett Johansson, Arnold Schwarzenegger, Bill Cosby, Bruce Willis, Charlie Sheen, Harry Reid, Michael Jackson, Oprah Winfrey, Dennis Rodman, Sheldon Adelson, George Soros, Tom Arnold, Mike Myers, Kate Gosselin, Britney Spears, Tiger Woods, and Jim Carrey, among others. He claims that his firm has filed more lawsuits against the media than any other law firm. His law firm Lavely & Singer has been described as "one of Hollywood's go-to law firms".

== Early life and education ==
Singer grew up lower middle class in Canarsie, Brooklyn. His mother Sari had survived Auschwitz, while his father Gyula left Nazi-occupied Austria during World War II to teach soccer to American soldiers in Shanghai. His father pursued a career as a commercial artist in New York, and later established a factory and a showroom in Manhattan.

During his time as a student at the City College of New York, Singer initially contemplated a medical career but realized his sensitivity might be a hindrance. He also ruled out engineering after his father's death, as it would demand extensive hours of study. He eventually pursued a major in political science and later attended Brooklyn Law School, with his wife Deena providing support through her job as a legal secretary. He worked in a factory and supported his mother and younger sister. Singer initially wanted to become a tax lawyer.

== Career ==
Upon completing law school in 1977, Singer and his wife relocated to Southern California. He distributed his résumés to various Los Angeles firms while his wife secured a job at a prominent law firm that counted Bert Fields among its members. Singer worked in research for the entertainment law firm Schiff, Hirsch & Schreiber for three years until the firm closed unexpectedly in 1980, leaving Singer and litigator John H. Lavely Jr. without a place as other partners joined a major competitor. In June, Singer and Lavely Jr. established their own law firm, Lavely & Singer. Nearly two years later, they engaged in their first major celebrity case, representing comedian Richard Pryor against his fraudulent business manager. Their victory in the case established their reputation as prominent entertainment law attorneys and led to a continuous stream of referrals.

Singer successfully represented photographer Max Aguilera-Hellweg in a lawsuit against Arnold Schwarzenegger, who was accused of using a photo without permission for a body-building calendar. His victory caught the attention of Schwarzenegger's lawyer, Jake Bloom, who then referred both Schwarzenegger and Sylvestor Stallone to Singer for assistance with their legal issues. He would go on to assist Schwarzenegger in two lawsuits brought by women claiming they were smeared by political aides, with one suit eventually settled and the other dismissed.

Singer gained tabloid attention in 1999 when Sylvester Stallone enlisted his services to counter a lawsuit filed by five former household employees. The workers claimed they experienced "unusual directives" from Stallone and Jennifer Flavin, leading to their termination without full compensation, prompting a demand for $1.5 million in damages. One peculiar claim was an order to avoid communication or eye contact with Stallone's mother, Jackie. The staff, however, broke this rule when Jackie gifted them pens and autographed photos of herself for Christmas. Stallone and Flavin allegedly fired them upon discovering the breach. Singer vigorously refuted the allegations, stating they aimed to exploit the celebrity factor. He further contended that the workers were employed through a temporary agency on short-term contracts and highlighted the claim that one of the employees wore high heels while cleaning the house.

In 1983, Singer successfully represented producer Lawrence Gordon in a dispute with Paramount Pictures, obtaining a restraining order that allowed his client back on the lot.

In 2002, Singer defended Celine Dion's husband René Angélil against a 2002 accusation of rape and death threats, which he called "ridiculous"; the claims were subsequently dismissed in 2003.

In 2006, Singer was enlisted to handle Associated Press coverage critical of a land transaction involving Senator Harry Reid.

In 2008, Singer represented Jeremy Piven in a Broadway production case involving claims of mercury poisoning. His arguments ultimately persuaded an impartial arbitrator to support Piven's account of the events.

In 2009, Singer intervened on behalf of Demi Moore, sending assertive letters to various news websites that had speculated about a Photoshop error on the cover of W Magazine. He stated that Moore's appearance had not been digitally altered, and demanded retractions and removal of the stories. Amid reports of Whitney Houston's alleged backstage collapse and plans for rehab during her 2009 comeback, Singer emphatically refuted the National Enquirer's account as a malicious fabrication. He clarified that Houston was heading to continue her tour in Paris, criticizing the tabloid's use of unsubstantiated anonymous sources and highlighting their hypocrisy.

In 2010, he settled a suit with Gawker over the distribution of actor Eric Dane's sex tape, which involved allegations of copyright infringement.

In March 2011, he filed suits for Quentin Tarantino against neighbor Alan Ball over noisy macaws that disrupted Tarantino's work. Tarantino's deposition emphasized the unsettling nature of the bird noises and requested a soundproof aviary, following an unsuccessful attempt at an amicable resolution. Singer confirmed later that the case was resolved. The same year, Singer represented Charlie Sheen in his $100 million lawsuit against Warner Bros. and Chuck Lorre over his departure from Two And A Half Men following a public meltdown. The case was eventually settled. At Singer's Bar Association recognition ceremony, Sheen expressed gratitude, saying, "I have a hundred million reasons to thank Marty." Kim Kardashian also employed Singer's services to confront a man who had made claims about her for publicity, including allegations that she staged moments in her career for TV and entered her marriage with Kris Humphries despite lacking genuine affection. Singer's intervention prompted the man to retract his statements, apologize, and publicly admit his lack of firsthand knowledge regarding Kardashian's relationships, effectively ending the dispute.

In 2012, two massage therapists sued John Travolta for $2 million, alleging separate instances of improper advances and touching. Singer successfully argued that Travolta was in Manhattan, making the alleged Beverly Hills incidents impossible. A defamation suit against both Singer and Travolta ensued, but was later dismissed.

In 2014, Singer warned of a potential lawsuit against Google for delaying the removal of stolen images depicting numerous female celebrities, including Jennifer Lawrence, Amber Heard, Avril Lavigne, and Vanessa Hudgens. Singer's letter accused the websites of exploiting and victimizing these women; Google promptly removed the pictures in response.

In 2019, Singer deviated from his customary celebrity-focused cases by representing The Atlanta Journal-Constitution in a lawsuit against Clint Eastwood's film Richard Jewell. The lawsuit centered on the portrayal of their journalist, Kathy Scruggs, exchanging sex for stories.

In 2021, after NBA player Tristan Thompson faced allegations of infidelity while dating Khloé Kardashian, Singer issued a cease-and-desist letter and publicly addressed the accuser. That same year, he secured a default judgment for Thompson in his defamation case against a woman who falsely claimed he was the father of her child.

In 2022, Singer represented Ricky Martin in a brief legal dispute where his nephew alleged an incestuous relationship followed by mistreatment and psychological abuse, a case that was later dropped.

In 2023, Singer represented Lizzo following a lawsuit from three of her former dancers. The lawsuit alleged that Lizzo had breached California's Fair Employment and Housing Act by permitting an ongoing hostile work environment, encompassing instances of sexual and religious harassment, assault, and discrimination based on disability.

In 2012, Singer was recognized as Entertainment Lawyer of the Year by the Beverly Hills Bar Association and as "one of the best lawyers in America". He was named a Variety500 Honoree every year from 2017 to 2021.

Singer has specialized in using legal actions to assist celebrities in breaking contracts with managers who may have engaged in unauthorized talent agent activities, potentially violating California law. For example, Singer helped Richard Pryor reclaim fees paid to his manager, David Franklin, who was not a licensed talent agent at the time.

Singer avoids television appearances and rarely contacts the media.

Singer's primary aim is to suppress damaging stories and avoid defamation rather than seeking substantial financial gains through lawsuits. He and his firm refuse to represent movie studios, which allows them to avoid seeking conflict-of-interest waivers when pursuing legal claims against companies for issues like faulty accounting. Singer also does not take up criminal work, but often refers clients to criminal lawyers. When asked about the possibility of specializing in criminal law, he shared a personal reason, explaining that his perspective was influenced by his brother-in-law's murder. He expressed reservations about engaging in criminal law due to concerns about securing acquittals based solely on technicalities, a common resolution in many criminal cases, and stated that he didn't want "to help people get away with things."

Singer is known for employing aggressive "pit bull" tactics, including cease-and-desist letters and legal threats to media outlets and accusers. However, his hard-edged approach has faced scrutiny in the wake of the #MeToo movement, as questions arise regarding the effectiveness of his strategies amid the shift towards empowering survivors of abuse to speak out.

== Extortion claim ==
In 2011, Mike Malin, a former Big Brother contestant, sued Singer, accusing him of extortion. The dispute stemmed from missing money in a restaurant business venture involving Malin and Top Chef Canada judge Shereen Arazm. Singer sent Malin a letter warning of a potential lawsuit and mentioned alleged sexual liaisons involving Malin. The case reached a California appeals court, which ultimately dismissed the extortion claim, and in July 2014, Singer was awarded $323,689 in attorneys' fees and costs for defending the case.

== Personal life ==
Singer and his wife have three children.
