= Lucia Mihalache =

Romanian sport shooter

Personal information
- Full name: Lucia Liliana Mihalache
- Nationality: Romania
- Born: 5 July 1967 (age 58) Arad, Romania
- Height: 1.69 m (5 ft 6 1/2 in)
- Weight: 90 kg (198 lb)

Sport
- Sport: Shooting
- Event: Skeet
- Club: CSM Arad
- Coached by: Ciorba Attila

Lucia Liliana Mihalache (born July 5, 1967 in Arad) is a Romanian sport shooter. At age 41, Mihalache made her official debut for the 2008 Summer Olympics in Beijing, where she competed in women's skeet shooting. She placed tenth out of nineteen shooters in the qualifying rounds of the event, with a total score of 66 points.

At the 2012 Summer Olympics in London, Mihalache, however, struggled to maintain her position against Beijing, hitting a total of 65 targets in women's skeet, finishing in twelfth place, behind Thailand's Sutiya Jiewchaloemmit.

Mihalache is also a member of CSM Arad for the shooting class, and is coached and trained by Ciorba Attila.
