= Adam Skrodzki =

Polish fencer

Adam Skrodzki (born 23 December 1983) is a Polish fencer. At the 2012 Summer Olympics, he competed in the Men's sabre, but was defeated in the second round.
