= Sonja Tol =

Dutch fencer (born 1972)

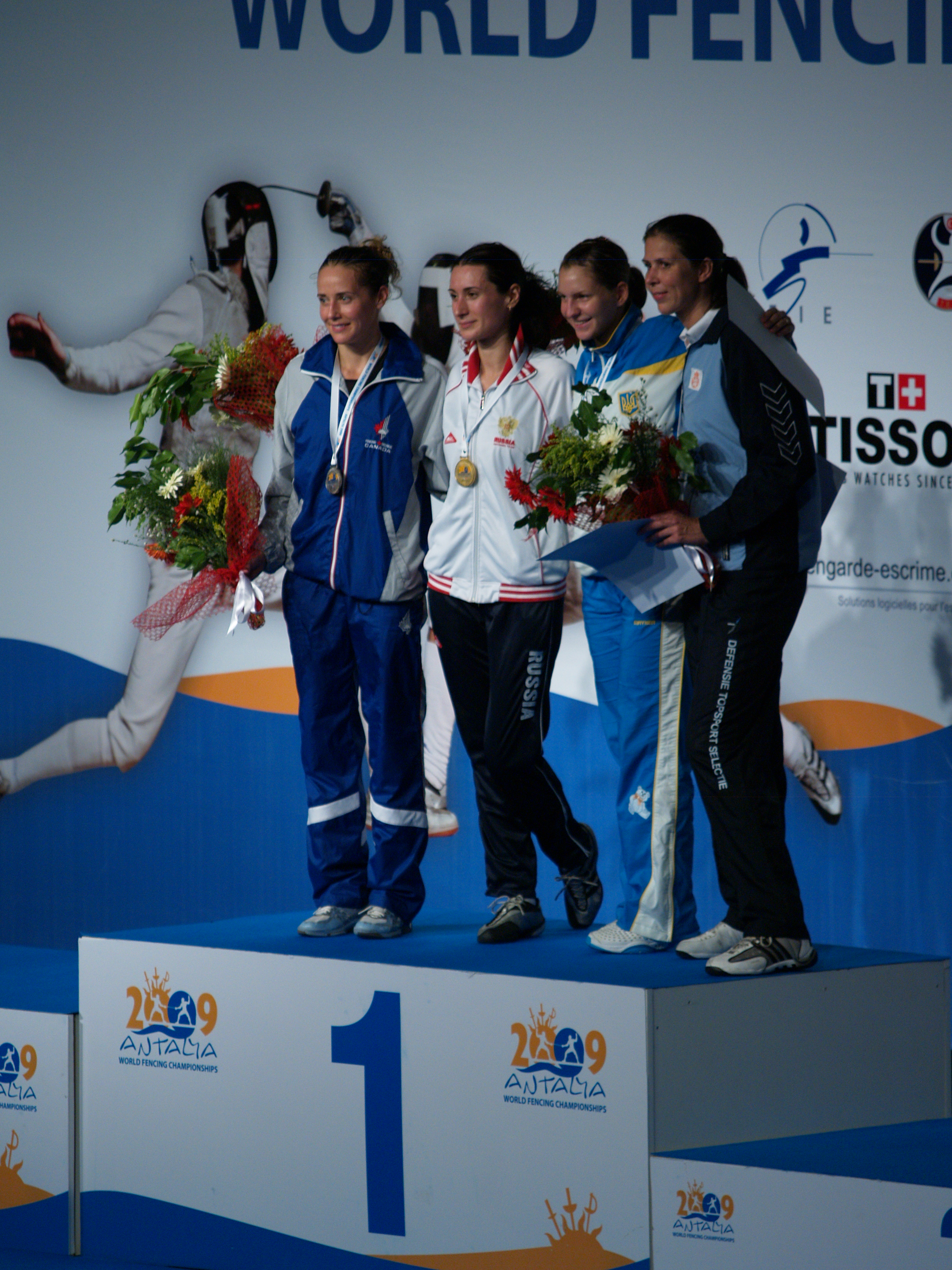
- Tol (right)

Personal information
- Born: 16 November 1972 (age 53) Ede, Netherlands

Sport
- Sport: Fencing
Medal record
Women's fencing
Representing Netherlands
World Championships
Bronze medal – third place	2009 Antalya	épée

Sonja Tol (born 16 November 1972 in Ede) is a Dutch épée fencer.

Tol represented the Netherlands at the 2004 Summer Olympics where she reached the second round in which she was eliminated by Ildikó Mincza-Nébald of Hungary 15–7.
