= Rareș Dumitrescu =

Romanian fencer (born 1983)

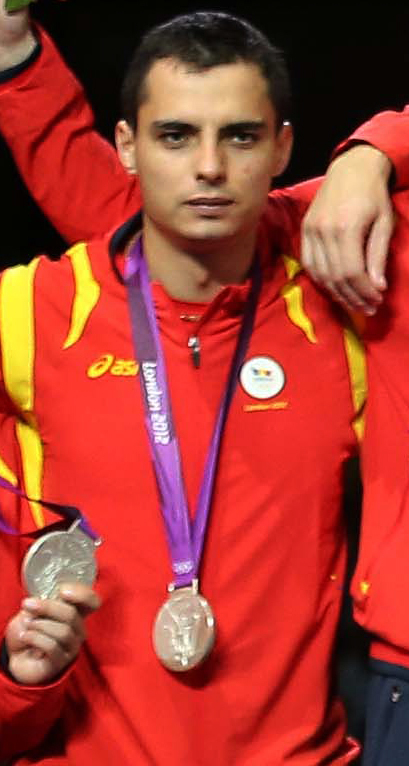

Personal information
- Full name: Rareș Eugen Dumitrescu
- Nickname: Dumi
- Nationality: Romania
- Born: 24 December 1983 (age 42) Brașov, Romania
- Height: 1.91 m (6 ft 3 in)
- Weight: 90 kg (198 lb; 14 st 2 lb)

Fencing career
- Sport: Fencing
- Weapon: sabre
- Hand: right-handed
- National coach: Mihai Covaliu
- Club: CS Dinamo București
- Head coach: Mihai Covaliu, Alexandru Chiculiță
- Retired: 2012
- FIE ranking: current ranking
Medal record
Men's fencing
Representing Romania
Olympic Games
Silver medal – second place	2012 London	Team sabre
World Championships
Gold medal – first place	2009 Antalya	Team sabre
Silver medal – second place	2009 Antalya	Individual sabre
Bronze medal – third place	2010 Paris	Team sabre
European Championships
Gold medal – first place	2006 Izmir	Team sabre
Silver medal – second place	2009 Plodviv	Team sabre
Silver medal – second place	2012 Legnano	Team sabre
Bronze medal – third place	2005 Zalaegerszeg	Team sabre

Rareș Dumitrescu (Romanian pronunciation: [ˈrareʃ dumiˈtresku]; born 24 December 1983 in Brașov) is a Romanian sabre fencer, World silver medal in 2009. With the Romanian team he was European champion in 2006, World champion in 2009 and Olympic team silver medal in 2012.

== Personal life ==
Dumitrescu discovered fencing at age ten by circumstance: his mother, a teacher, had a pupil whose father was a fencing coach. He began training at his local club CS Tractorul under Cătălin Albu, who also served as sparring partner in the absence of other sabre fencers in Brașov: the Olympic center was in Iași. He was also frustrated by a lack of money: his parents had to pay for his travel expenses and entrance fees when he began competition. He did not have dedicated fencing shoes either and wore out dozens of ordinary trainers on the piste. The hard training regimen almost made him quit fencing when he was in high school, but he persevered and transferred in 2003 to CS Dinamo București.

Dumitrescu graduated in 2006 from the Faculty of physical education and sport of the Transilvania University of Brașov and earned in 2008 a master's degree in marketing and sport management from the Alexandru Ioan Cuza University in Iași. He married in 2009 his high school girlfriend.

== Career ==
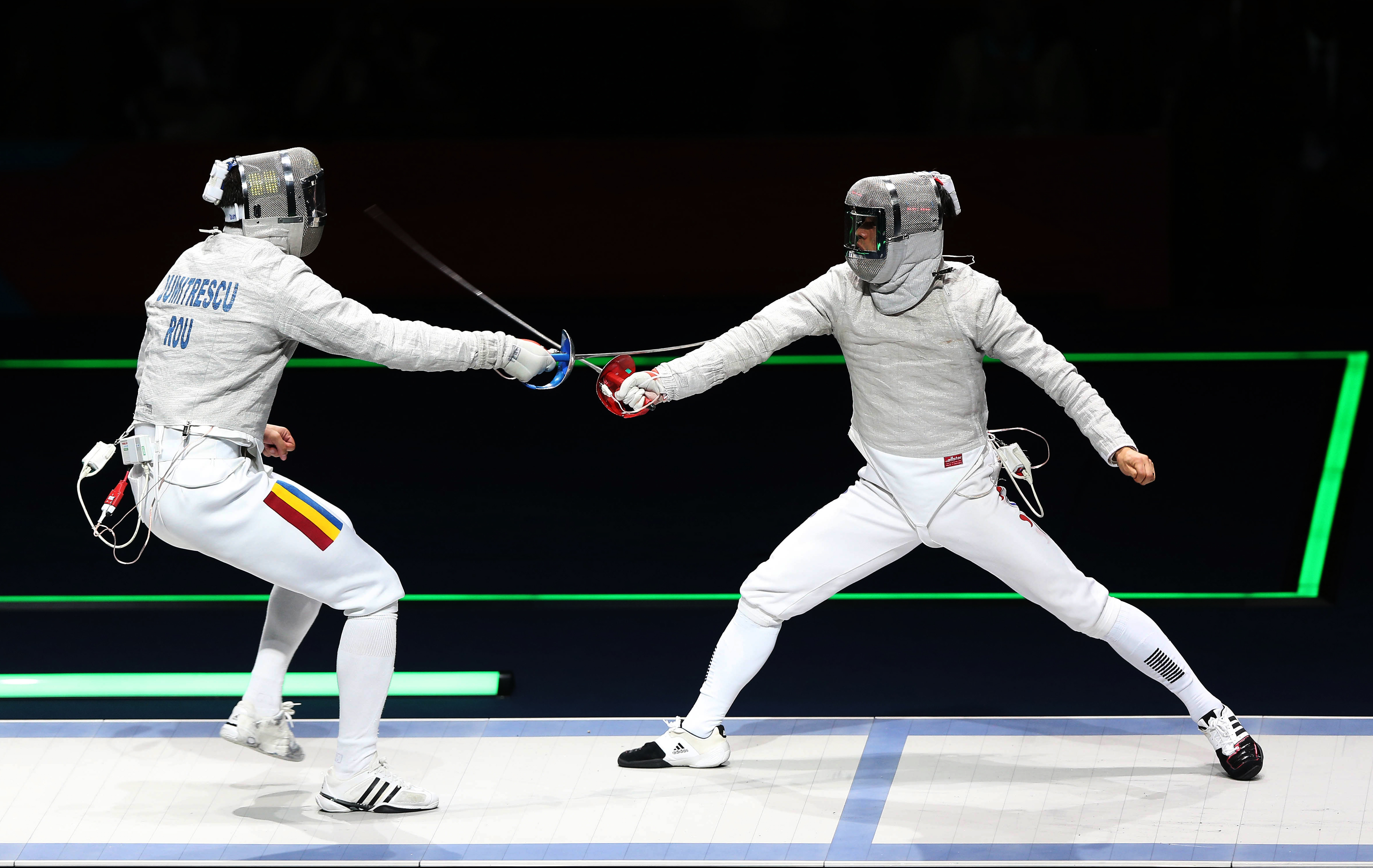
Dumitrescu (L) during the team men's sabre final at the 2012 Summer Olympics

Dumitrescu earned his first major title in 2005 with a team bronze medal at the European Championships in Zalaegerszeg. In March 2006 he got on the podium for the first time in a World Cup event with a silver medal in Athens. He also won the European Champion Clubs' Cup with CS Dinamo. A few months later he earned a team gold medal at the European Championships in Izmir.

In 2008 Dumitrescu won his first World Cup title in Madrid. He made his Olympic debut in the Beijing Games, but was eliminated in the table of 16 by France's Julien Pillet. He was again tempted to retire because he was tired of commuting between Brașov and Bucharest, but his former teammate Mihai Covaliu, now coach of the national team, persuaded him to go on.

In 2009 he won two World Cup stages in Budapest and Warsaw. He was eliminated early in the individual event of the European Championships in Plovdiv, but took the silver medal with Romania. At the World Championships in Antalya he made his way to the final, where he was defeated by Germany's Nicolas Limbach and took the silver medal. He was noted for his “fighting spirit and his intelligence” as well as his technical progress. In the team event Romania created an upset by beating favourites Germany, France and Hungary to meet Italy in the final. Dumitrescu entered for the last bout on 40–34 for Italy and beat Aldo Montano 11–4 to win Romania their first World gold medal in sabre. Dumitrescu finished the 2008–09 season number two in FIE rankings. For this performance he was granted the title of master emeritus in sport.

At the men's sabre competition at the 2012 Summer Olympics Dumitrescu was beaten in the match for the third place by Nikolay Kovalev and missed the podium, but won a silver medal in the team sabre event. He retired after the Games to become a coach at CS Dinamo.
