= Diego Occhiuzzi =

Italian fencer (born 1981)

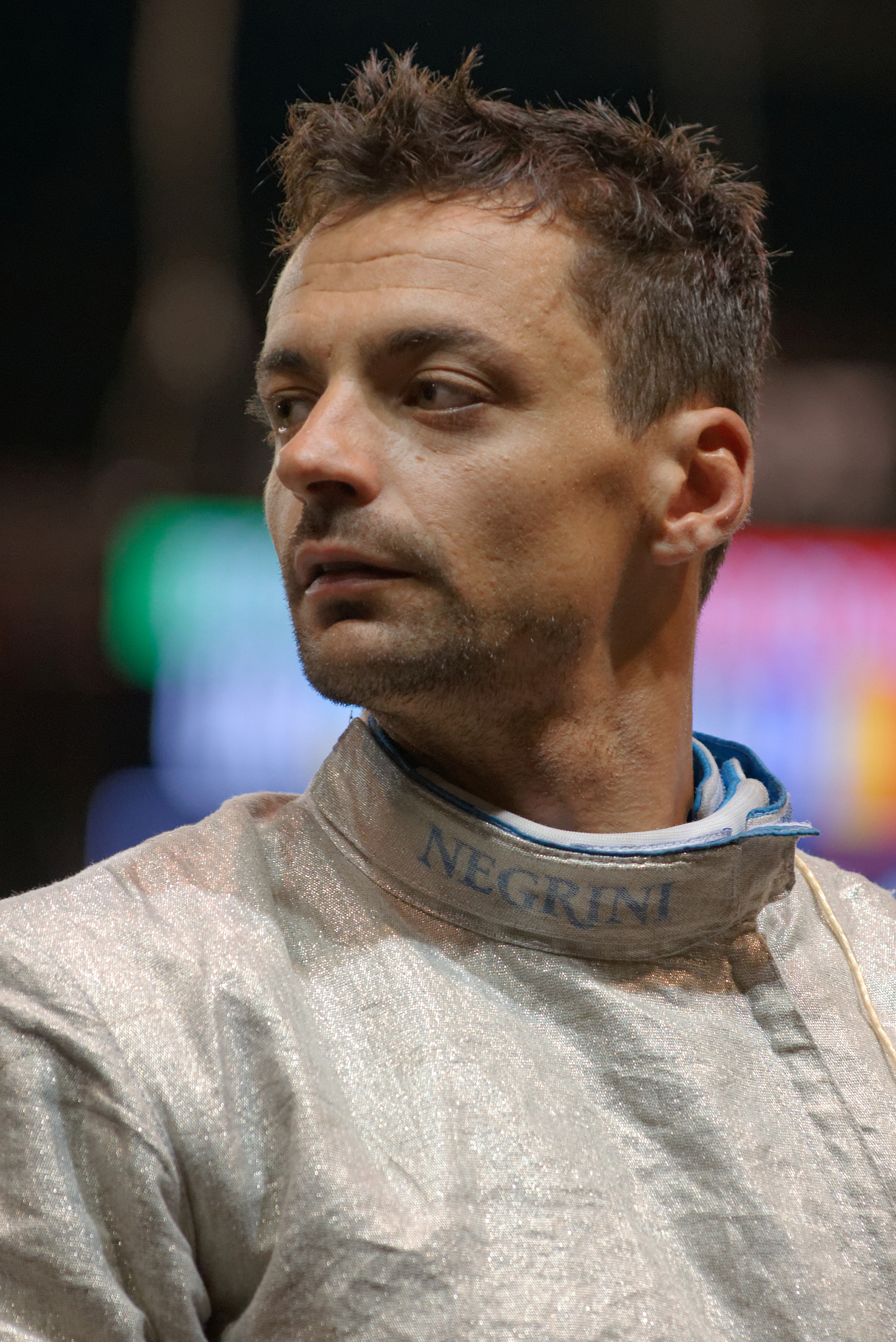
- Occhiuzzi at the 2014 European Fencing Championships

Personal information
- Born: 30 April 1981 (age 45) Naples, Italy
- Height: 1.80 m (5 ft 11 in)
- Weight: 80 kg (176 lb; 12 st 8 lb)

Fencing career
- Sport: Fencing
- Country: Italy
- Weapon: Sabre
- Hand: right-handed
- Club: CS Aeronautica Militare
- Head coach: Leonardo Caserta
- FIE ranking: current ranking
Medal record
Olympic Games
Silver medal – second place	2012 London	Individual
Bronze medal – third place	2008 Beijing	Team
Bronze medal – third place	2012 London	Team
World Championships
Gold medal – first place	2015 Moscow	Team
Silver medal – second place	2010 Paris	Team
Bronze medal – third place	2007 St Petersburg	Team
Bronze medal – third place	2011 Catania	Team
European Championships
Gold medal – first place	2013 Zagreb	Team
Gold medal – first place	2014 Strasbourg	Team

Diego Occhiuzzi (born 30 April 1981) is an Italian fencer and olympic medal winner in team sabre competition. At the 2012 Summer Olympics he competed in the Men's sabre where he lost to Áron Szilágyi in the final round to win the silver medal. He was also part of the Italian men's sabre team that won the bronze medal.

== Achievements ==
Occhiuzzi has been most successful in team events, having won a bronze Olympic medals in both 2008 and 2012, a bronze, a silver, and another bronze from the 2007, 2010, and 2011 World Fencing Championships, and a gold from both the 2013 and 2014 European Fencing Championships. However, his best result is having placed second in the individual event at the 2012 Olympics. In the finals, he lost to Áron Szilágyi, 15–8.
