= Florin Zalomir =

Romanian fencer (1981–2022)

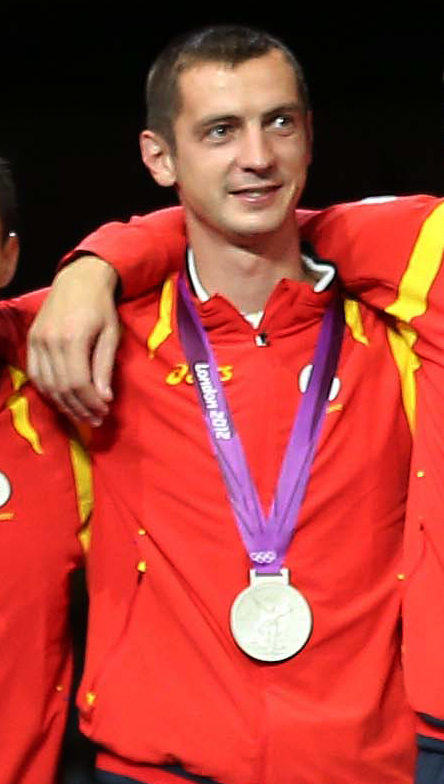

Personal information
- Full name: Florin Gelu Zalomir
- Born: 21 April 1981 Iaşi, Romania
- Died: 3 October 2022 (aged 41) Otopeni, Romania
- Height: 1.84 m (6 ft 0 in)
- Weight: 78 kg (172 lb; 12.3 st)

Fencing career
- Sport: Fencing
- Weapon: Sabre
- Hand: Right-handed
- National coach: Mihai Covaliu
- Club: CS Dinamo București
- Retired: 2012
- FIE ranking: Ranking (archive)
Medal record
Men's sabre
Representing Romania
Olympic Games
Silver medal – second place	2012 London	Team sabre
World Championships
Gold medal – first place	2009 Antalya	Team sabre
Bronze medal – third place	2001 Nîmes	Team sabre
Bronze medal – third place	2010 Paris	Team sabre
European Championships
Gold medal – first place	2006 Izmir	Team sabre
Silver medal – second place	2009 Plovdiv	Team sabre
Silver medal – second place	2012 Legnano	Team sabre
Bronze medal – third place	2006 Izmir	Individual sabre

Florin Zalomir (Romanian pronunciation: [floˈrin zaloˈmir]; 21 April 1981 – 3 October 2022) was a Romanian sabre fencer who competed in the 2012 Summer Olympics winning a silver medal in the sabre team event.

== Personal life ==
After the 2003 European Fencing Championships from Bourges, France, Zalomir joined the Foreign Legion. He returned to sport after two and a half years of engagement in France and Afghanistan.

Zalomir died by suicide on 3 October 2022.
