= Fencing at the 2010 Asian Games – Women's team épée =

Women's team épée at the 2010 Asian Games
- Venue: Guangda Gymnasium
- Date: 23 November 2010
- Competitors: 36 from 10 nations

Medalists
| gold medal | Japan; Megumi Ikeda, Nozomi Nakano, Ayaka Shimookawa |
| silver medal | China; Luo Xiaojuan, Sun Yujie, Xu Anqi, Yin Mingfang |
| bronze medal | South Korea; Jung Hyo-jung, Oh Yun-hee, Park Se-ra, Shin A-lam |
| bronze medal | Hong Kong; Bjork Cheng, Cheung Sik Lui, Sabrina Lui, Yeung Chui Ling |

The women's team épée competition at the 2010 Asian Games in Guangzhou was held on 23 November at the Guangda Gymnasium.

== Schedule ==
All times are China Standard Time (UTC+08:00)

| Date | Time | Event |
|---|---|---|
| Tuesday, 23 November 2010 | 13:00 | Round of 16 |
| Tuesday, 23 November 2010 | 14:30 | Quarterfinals |
| Tuesday, 23 November 2010 | 16:00 | Semifinals |
| Tuesday, 23 November 2010 | 19:30 | Gold medal match |

== Seeding ==
The teams were seeded taking into account the results achieved by competitors representing each team in the individual event.

| Rank | Team | Fencer | | Total |
| Rank | Team | 1 | 2 | Total |
|---|---|---|---|---|
| 1 | China (CHN) | 1 | 3 | 4 |
| 2 | Japan (JPN) | 2 | 9 | 11 |
| 3 | Hong Kong (HKG) | 3 | 8 | 11 |
| 4 | Chinese Taipei (TPE) | 5 | 6 | 11 |
| 5 | South Korea (KOR) | 7 | 10 | 17 |
| 6 | Kazakhstan (KAZ) | 12 | 13 | 25 |
| 7 | Kyrgyzstan (KGZ) | 11 | 17 | 28 |
| 8 | India (IND) | 14 | 16 | 30 |
| 9 | Vietnam (VIE) | 15 | 18 | 33 |
| 10 | Qatar (QAT) | 19 | 20 | 39 |

== Results ==
Round of 16
9 | Vietnam | 45
8 | India | 38
7 | Kyrgyzstan | 45
10 | Qatar | 21

Quarterfinals
1 | China | 45
9 | Vietnam | 25
5 | South Korea | 45
4 | Chinese Taipei | 22
3 | Hong Kong | 25
6 | Kazakhstan | 22
7 | Kyrgyzstan | 29
2 | Japan | 45

Semifinals
1 | China | 43
5 | South Korea | 28
3 | Hong Kong | 32
2 | Japan | 36

Gold medal match
1 | China | 29
2 | Japan | 36

== Final standing ==
| Rank | Team |
|---|---|
| 1st place, gold medalist(s) | Japan (JPN); Megumi Ikeda; Nozomi Nakano; Ayaka Shimookawa |
| 2nd place, silver medalist(s) | China (CHN); Luo Xiaojuan; Sun Yujie; Xu Anqi; Yin Mingfang |
| 3rd place, bronze medalist(s) | South Korea (KOR); Jung Hyo-jung; Oh Yun-hee; Park Se-ra; Shin A-lam |
| 3rd place, bronze medalist(s) | Hong Kong (HKG); Bjork Cheng; Cheung Sik Lui; Sabrina Lui; Yeung Chui Ling |
| 5 | Chinese Taipei (TPE); Chang Chia-ling; Chen Yin-hua; Cheng Ya-wen; Hsu Jo-ting |
| 6 | Kazakhstan (KAZ); Karina Rakhmetova; Oxana Svatkovskaya; Jamilya Yunusbayeva |
| 7 | Kyrgyzstan (KGZ); Mergul Abieva; Larisa Andreeva; Vera Kaminskaya; Julia Yaitsevskaya |
| 8 | Vietnam (VIE); Hà Thị Sen; Nguyễn Thanh Vân; Nguyễn Thị Như Hoa; Trần Thị Len |
| 9 | India (IND); Kabita Devi; V. P. Dilna; Shammipreet Kaur |
| 10 | Qatar (QAT); Noora Al-Hitmi; Hanadi Al-Yami; Fatima Hammad |
