= Fencing at the 2006 Asian Games – Women's team épée =

Women's team épée at the 2006 Asian Games
- Venue: Al-Arabi Indoor Hall
- Date: 13 December 2006
- Competitors: 46 from 12 nations

Medalists
gold medal	China; Li Na, Luo Xiaojuan, Zhang Li, Zhong Weiping
silver medal	South Korea; Choi Eun-sook, Jung Hyo-jung, Park Se-ra, Shin A-lam
bronze medal	Japan; Shizuka Ikehata, Hiroko Narita, Yoshie Takeyama
bronze medal	Hong Kong; Bjork Cheng, Cheung Yi Nei, Sabrina Lui, Yeung Chui Ling

The women's team épée competition at the 2006 Asian Games in Doha was held on 13 December at the Al-Arabi Indoor Hall.

== Schedule ==
All times are Arabia Standard Time (UTC+03:00)

Date	Time	Event
Wednesday, 13 December 2006	12:20	Round of 16
Wednesday, 13 December 2006	13:45	Quarterfinals
Wednesday, 13 December 2006	15:10	Semifinals
Wednesday, 13 December 2006	19:00	Gold medal match

== Seeding ==
The teams were seeded taking into account the results achieved by competitors representing each team in the individual event.

Rank	Team	Fencer		Total
Rank	Team	1	2	Total
1	South Korea (KOR)	1	3	4
2	China (CHN)	2	3	5
3	Hong Kong (HKG)	5	6	11
4	Japan (JPN)	8	10	18
5	Kazakhstan (KAZ)	7	14	21
6	Vietnam (VIE)	9	13	22
7	Chinese Taipei (TPE)	11	15	26
8	Kyrgyzstan (KGZ)	12	18	30
9	India (IND)	16	17	33
10	Kuwait (KUW)	20	23	43
11	Qatar (QAT)	22	25	47
12	Macau (MAC)	24	26	50

== Results ==
Round of 16
9	India	36
8	Kyrgyzstan	41
5	Kazakhstan	45
12	Macau	19
11	Qatar	21
6	Vietnam	45
7	Chinese Taipei	45
10	Kuwait	20

Quarterfinals
1	South Korea	45
8	Kyrgyzstan	17
5	Kazakhstan	36
4	Japan	45
3	Hong Kong	41
6	Vietnam	38
7	Chinese Taipei	26
2	China	45

Semifinals
1	South Korea	45
4	Japan	33
3	Hong Kong	36
2	China	45

Gold medal match
1	South Korea	36
2	China	43

== Final standing ==
Rank	Team
1st place, gold medalist(s)	China (CHN); Li Na; Luo Xiaojuan; Zhang Li; Zhong Weiping
2nd place, silver medalist(s)	South Korea (KOR); Choi Eun-sook; Jung Hyo-jung; Park Se-ra; Shin A-lam
3rd place, bronze medalist(s)	Japan (JPN); Shizuka Ikehata; Hiroko Narita; Yoshie Takeyama
3rd place, bronze medalist(s)	Hong Kong (HKG); Bjork Cheng; Cheung Yi Nei; Sabrina Lui; Yeung Chui Ling
5	Kazakhstan (KAZ); Olga Kolmakova; Margarita Michshuk; Ardak Sadykova; Yekaterina Skornevskaya
6	Vietnam (VIE); Hà Thị Sen; Nguyễn Thị Ngân; Nguyễn Thị Như Hoa; Trần Thị Len
7	Chinese Taipei (TPE); Chang Chia-ling; Chen Yin-hua; Cheng Ya-wen; Yu Mi-hsuan
8	Kyrgyzstan (KGZ); Zuhra Bekbulatova; Roza Bikkinina; Tatiana Ruban
9	India (IND); E. Gita Devi; Samashakhi Devi; Karamjit Kaur; Ruchi Trikha
10	Kuwait (KUW); Kholoud Al-Abduljader; Lulwa Al-Ayoub; Abeer Al-Selmi; Hanouf Al-Selmi
11	Qatar (QAT); Fatma Al-Julandani; Fatima Hammad; Bekita Muwangua; Hala Swaileh
12	Macau (MAC); Chek Soi Lin; Ho Sin Mei; Kong Choi San; U Nga Fong
