= Fencing at the 2012 Summer Olympics – Women's épée =

Women's épée at the Games of the XXX Olympiad
- Venue: ExCeL Exhibition Centre
- Date: 30 July
- Competitors: 37 from 20 nations

Medalists
1st place, gold medalist(s)		Yana Shemyakina	Ukraine
2nd place, silver medalist(s)		Britta Heidemann	Germany
3rd place, bronze medalist(s)		Sun Yujie	China

The women's épée competition in fencing at the 2012 Olympic Games in London was held on 30 July at the ExCeL Exhibition Centre.

Yana Shemyakina from Ukraine won the gold medal. After a time-keeping error by a games volunteer in the second semi final, Shin A-Lam controversially lost her match to her German opponent in extra time.

== Schedule ==
All times are British Summer Time (UTC+1)

Date	Time	Round
Monday, 30 July 2012	10:30	Qualifications – Quarter-finals
Monday, 30 July 2012	18:00	Semi-finals
Monday, 30 July 2012	19:00	Bronze medal match
Monday, 30 July 2012	19:40	Final

== Results ==
=== Finals ===
Semi-finals
Sun Yujie (CHN)	13
Yana Shemyakina (UKR)	14
Shin A-Lam (KOR)	5
Britta Heidemann (GER)	6

Final
Yana Shemyakina (UKR)	9
Britta Heidemann (GER)	8
Bronze medal match
Sun Yujie (CHN)	15
Shin A-Lam (KOR)	11

=== Top half ===
==== Section 1 ====
Round of 64
Imke Duplitzer (GER)	15
Maria Martinez (VEN)	10

Round of 32
Sun Yujie (CHN)	15
Imke Duplitzer (GER)	10
Tiffany Géroudet (SUI)	15
Magdalena Piekarska (POL)	14
Mara Navarria (ITA)	12
Maya Lawrence (USA)	15
Nozomi Nakano (JPN)	11
Rossella Fiamingo (ITA)	15

Round of 16
Sun Yujie (CHN)	15
Tiffany Géroudet (SUI)	10
Maya Lawrence (USA)	7
Rossella Fiamingo (ITA)	15

Quarter-finals
Sun Yujie (CHN)	15
Rossella Fiamingo (ITA)	14

==== Section 2 ====
Round of 64
Hsu Jo-Ting (TPE)	15
Mona Hassanein (EGY)	10
Corinna Lawrence (GBR)	15
Cáterin Bravo (CHI)	12

Round of 32
Ana Maria Brânză (ROU)	15
Hsu Jo-Ting (TPE)	8
Lyubov Shutova (RUS)	12
Yana Shemyakina (UKR)	15
Laura Flessel-Colovic (FRA)	15
Courtney Hurley (USA)	12
Corinna Lawrence (GBR)	9
Simona Gherman (ROU)	15

Round of 16
Ana Maria Brânză (ROU)	13
Yana Shemyakina (UKR)	14
Laura Flessel-Colovic (FRA)	13
Simona Gherman (ROU)	15

Quarter-finals
Yana Shemyakina (UKR)	15
Simona Gherman (ROU)	14

=== Bottom half ===
==== Section 3 ====
Round of 64
Olena Kryvytska (UKR)	15
Susie Scanlan (USA)	13

Round of 32
Anca Măroiu (ROU)	15
Olena Kryvytska (UKR)	10
Anna Sivkova (RUS)	15
Jung Hyo-Jung (KOR)	12
Shin A-Lam (KOR)	15
Sherraine Schalm (CAN)	12
Violetta Kolobova (RUS)	14
Monika Sozanska (GER)	15

Round of 16
Anca Măroiu (ROU)	15
Anna Sivkova (RUS)	11
Shin A-Lam (KOR)	14
Monika Sozanska (GER)	9

Quarter-finals
Anca Măroiu (ROU)	14
Shin A-Lam (KOR)	15

==== Section 4 ====
Round of 64
Yeung Chui Ling (HKG)	11
Kseniya Pantelyeyeva (UKR)	15

Round of 32
Luo Xiaojuan (CHN)	9
Sarra Besbes (TUN)	15
Emese Szász (HUN)	12
Choi In-Jeong (KOR)	15
Britta Heidemann (GER)	14
Bianca Del Carretto (ITA)	13
Kseniya Pantelyeyeva (UKR)	10
Li Na (CHN)	15

Round of 16
Sarra Besbes (TUN)	12
Choi In-Jeong (KOR)	11
Britta Heidemann (GER)	14
Li Na (CHN)	13

Quarter-finals
Sarra Besbes (TUN)	12
Britta Heidemann (GER)	15

== Results ==
Rank	Fencer	Country
1st place, gold medalist(s)	Yana Shemyakina	Ukraine
2nd place, silver medalist(s)	Britta Heidemann	Germany
3rd place, bronze medalist(s)	Sun Yujie	China
4	Shin A-Lam	South Korea
5	Anca Măroiu	Romania
6	Simona Gherman	Romania
7	Rossella Fiamingo	Italy
8	Sarra Besbes	Tunisia
9	Li Na	China
10	Monika Sozanska	Germany
11	Ana Brânză	Romania
12	Choi In-Jeong	South Korea
13	Laura Flessel-Colovic	France
14	Tiffany Geroudet	Switzerland
15	Anna Sivkova	Russia
16	Maya Lawrence	United States
17	Luo Xiaojuan	China
18	Mara Navarria	Italy
19	Jung Hyo-Jung	South Korea
20	Magdalena Piekarska	Poland
21	Bianca Del Carretto	Italy
22	Courtney Hurley	United States
23	Lyubov Shutova	Russia
24	Sherraine Schalm-MacKay	Canada
25	Emese Szász	Hungary
26	Nozomi Nakano	Japan
27	Violetta Kolobova	Russia
28	Corinna Lawrence	Great Britain
29	Imke Duplitzer	Germany
30	Kseniya Pantelyeyeva	Ukraine
31	Olena Kryvytska	Ukraine
32	Hsu Jo-Ting	Chinese Taipei
33	Mona Hassanein	Egypt
34	Susie Scanlan	United States
35	Yeung Chui Ling	Hong Kong
36	Maria Martinez	Venezuela
37	Cáterin Bravo	Chile

== See also ==
- Fencing's Never-Ending Second
