= Fencing at the 2010 Asian Games – Women's individual épée =

Women's individual épée at the 2010 Asian Games
- Venue: Guangda Gymnasium
- Date: 20 November 2010
- Competitors: 20 from 10 nations

Medalists
gold medal	Luo Xiaojuan	China
silver medal	Nozomi Nakano	Japan
bronze medal	Xu Anqi	China
bronze medal	Yeung Chui Ling	Hong Kong

The women's individual épée competition at the 2010 Asian Games in Guangzhou was held on 20 November at the Guangda Gymnasium.

== Schedule ==
All times are China Standard Time (UTC+08:00)

Date	Time	Event
Saturday, 20 November 2010	12:30	Round of pools
Saturday, 20 November 2010	15:00	Round of 16
Saturday, 20 November 2010	16:00	Quarterfinals
Saturday, 20 November 2010	19:00	Semifinals
Saturday, 20 November 2010	20:30	Gold medal match

== Results ==
=== Round of pools ===
==== Pool 1 ====
Athlete	KOR	TPE	JPN	VIE	KAZ	IND	QAT
Oh Yun-hee (KOR)	—	4–5	1–2	5–2	5–2	4–3	5–3
Hsu Jo-ting (TPE)	5–4	—	2–5	5–2	5–3	5–1	5–2
Megumi Ikeda (JPN)	2–1	5–2	—	5–4	5–1	2–3	5–4
Nguyễn Thị Như Hoa (VIE)	2–5	2–5	4–5	—	2–5	3–2	5–1
Oxana Svatkovskaya (KAZ)	2–5	3–5	1–5	5–2	—	5–4	5–4
Kabita Devi (IND)	3–4	1–5	3–2	2–3	4–5	—	2–1
Hanadi Al-Yami (QAT)	3–5	2–5	4–5	1–5	4–5	1–2	—

==== Pool 2 ====
Athlete	KOR	CHN	KGZ	HKG	TPE	IND	QAT
Jung Hyo-jung (KOR)	—	1–5	5–1	3–5	3–4	5–4	5–1
Xu Anqi (CHN)	5–1	—	4–2	5–2	5–1	5–3	5–0
Larisa Andreeva (KGZ)	1–5	2–4	—	5–3	3–5	5–4	5–2
Sabrina Lui (HKG)	5–3	2–5	3–5	—	4–5	2–5	5–0
Cheng Ya-wen (TPE)	4–3	1–5	5–3	5–4	—	5–0	5–1
V. P. Dilna (IND)	4–5	3–5	4–5	5–2	0–5	—	5–1
Fatima Hammad (QAT)	1–5	0–5	2–5	0–5	1–5	1–5	—

==== Pool 3 ====
Athlete	CHN	JPN	HKG	KAZ	VIE	KGZ
Luo Xiaojuan (CHN)	—	5–2	2–5	5–2	5–3	5–4
Nozomi Nakano (JPN)	2–5	—	2–1	5–2	5–3	5–2
Yeung Chui Ling (HKG)	5–2	1–2	—	3–2	3–2	5–3
Jamilya Yunusbayeva (KAZ)	2–5	2–5	2–3	—	5–2	5–4
Hà Thị Sen (VIE)	3–5	3–5	2–3	2–5	—	4–5
Mergul Abieva (KGZ)	4–5	2–5	3–5	4–5	5–4	—

==== Summary ====
Rank	Pool	Athlete	W	L	W/M	TD	TF
1	2	Xu Anqi (CHN)	6	0	1.000	+20	29
2	1	Hsu Jo-ting (TPE)	5	1	0.833	+10	27
3	2	Cheng Ya-wen (TPE)	5	1	0.833	+9	25
4	1	Megumi Ikeda (JPN)	5	1	0.833	+9	24
5	3	Luo Xiaojuan (CHN)	4	1	0.800	+6	22
6	3	Nozomi Nakano (JPN)	4	1	0.800	+6	19
7	3	Yeung Chui Ling (HKG)	4	1	0.800	+6	17
8	1	Oh Yun-hee (KOR)	4	2	0.667	+7	24
9	2	Jung Hyo-jung (KOR)	3	3	0.500	+2	22
10	2	Larisa Andreeva (KGZ)	3	3	0.500	–2	21
11	1	Oxana Svatkovskaya (KAZ)	3	3	0.500	–4	21
12	3	Jamilya Yunusbayeva (KAZ)	2	3	0.400	–3	16
13	2	Sabrina Lui (HKG)	2	4	0.333	–2	21
13	2	V. P. Dilna (IND)	2	4	0.333	–2	21
15	1	Nguyễn Thị Như Hoa (VIE)	2	4	0.333	–5	18
16	1	Kabita Devi (IND)	2	4	0.333	–5	15
17	3	Mergul Abieva (KGZ)	1	4	0.200	–6	18
18	3	Hà Thị Sen (VIE)	0	5	0.000	–9	14
19	1	Hanadi Al-Yami (QAT)	0	6	0.000	–12	15
20	2	Fatima Hammad (QAT)	0	6	0.000	–25	5

=== Knockout round ===
Round of 16
1	Xu Anqi (CHN)	15
16	Kabita Devi (IND)	7
9	Jung Hyo-jung (KOR)	6
8	Oh Yun-hee (KOR)	3
5	Luo Xiaojuan (CHN)	15
12	Jamilya Yunusbayeva (KAZ)	8
13	Sabrina Lui (HKG)	15
4	Megumi Ikeda (JPN)	6
3	Cheng Ya-wen (TPE)	15
14	V. P. Dilna (IND)	8
11	Oxana Svatkovskaya (KAZ)	12
6	Nozomi Nakano (JPN)	15
7	Yeung Chui Ling (HKG)	7
10	Larisa Andreeva (KGZ)	6
15	Nguyễn Thị Như Hoa (VIE)	12
2	Hsu Jo-ting (TPE)	15

Quarterfinals
1	Xu Anqi (CHN)	15
9	Jung Hyo-jung (KOR)	6
5	Luo Xiaojuan (CHN)	15
13	Sabrina Lui (HKG)	9
3	Cheng Ya-wen (TPE)	9
6	Nozomi Nakano (JPN)	15
7	Yeung Chui Ling (HKG)	15
2	Hsu Jo-ting (TPE)	13

Semifinals
1	Xu Anqi (CHN)	14
5	Luo Xiaojuan (CHN)	15
6	Nozomi Nakano (JPN)	6
7	Yeung Chui Ling (HKG)	5

Gold medal match
5	Luo Xiaojuan (CHN)	13
6	Nozomi Nakano (JPN)	10

== Final standing ==
Rank	Athlete
1st place, gold medalist(s)	Luo Xiaojuan (CHN)
2nd place, silver medalist(s)	Nozomi Nakano (JPN)
3rd place, bronze medalist(s)	Xu Anqi (CHN)
3rd place, bronze medalist(s)	Yeung Chui Ling (HKG)
5	Hsu Jo-ting (TPE)
6	Cheng Ya-wen (TPE)
7	Jung Hyo-jung (KOR)
8	Sabrina Lui (HKG)
9	Megumi Ikeda (JPN)
10	Oh Yun-hee (KOR)
11	Larisa Andreeva (KGZ)
12	Oxana Svatkovskaya (KAZ)
13	Jamilya Yunusbayeva (KAZ)
14	V. P. Dilna (IND)
15	Nguyễn Thị Như Hoa (VIE)
16	Kabita Devi (IND)
17	Mergul Abieva (KGZ)
18	Hà Thị Sen (VIE)
19	Hanadi Al-Yami (QAT)
20	Fatima Hammad (QAT)
