= Fencing at the 2006 Asian Games – Women's individual épée =

Women's individual épée at the 2006 Asian Games
- Venue: Al-Arabi Indoor Hall
- Date: 10 December 2006
- Competitors: 26 from 14 nations

Medalists
gold medal	Park Se-ra	South Korea
silver medal	Zhong Weiping	China
bronze medal	Li Na	China
bronze medal	Shin A-lam	South Korea

The women's individual épée competition at the 2006 Asian Games in Doha was held on 10 December at the Al-Arabi Indoor Hall.

== Schedule ==
All times are Arabia Standard Time (UTC+03:00)

Date	Time	Event
Sunday, 10 December 2006	12:30	Round of pools
Sunday, 10 December 2006	14:30	Round of 32
Sunday, 10 December 2006	15:20	Round of 16
Sunday, 10 December 2006	16:10	Quarterfinals
Sunday, 10 December 2006	18:30	Semifinals
Sunday, 10 December 2006	19:25	Gold medal match

== Results ==
=== Round of pools ===
==== Pool 1 ====
Athlete	CHN	HKG	TPE	THA	KUW	IND	KGZ
Li Na (CHN)	—	3–1	5–2	5–1	5–2	5–0	5–2
Bjork Cheng (HKG)	1–3	—	5–2	5–3	5–0	5–1	5–2
Yu Mi-hsuan (TPE)	2–5	2–5	—	4–5	5–1	5–3	3–5
Siritida Choochokkul (THA)	1–5	3–5	5–4	—	3–5	3–5	5–4
Abeer Al-Selmi (KUW)	2–5	0–5	1–5	5–3	—	2–5	0–5
Ruchi Trikha (IND)	0–5	1–5	3–5	5–3	5–2	—	2–5
Tatiana Ruban (KGZ)	2–5	2–5	5–3	4–5	5–0	5–2	—

==== Pool 2 ====
Athlete	CHN	HKG	KAZ	IND	KUW	MAC	QAT
Zhong Weiping (CHN)	—	4–5	5–3	5–1	5–1	5–0	5–0
Yeung Chui Ling (HKG)	5–4	—	4–5	5–0	5–2	5–2	5–2
Margarita Michshuk (KAZ)	3–5	5–4	—	5–2	5–2	4–2	5–1
Samashakhi Devi (IND)	1–5	0–5	2–5	—	5–2	5–1	5–3
Hanouf Al-Selmi (KUW)	1–5	2–5	2–5	2–5	—	5–1	2–1
Kong Choi San (MAC)	0–5	2–5	2–4	1–5	1–5	—	3–5
Fatma Al-Julandani (QAT)	0–5	2–5	1–5	3–5	1–2	5–3	—

==== Pool 3 ====
Athlete	KOR	JPN	KAZ	VIE	PHI	QAT
Shin A-lam (KOR)	—	5–1	5–4	5–4	5–3	5–1
Shizuka Ikehata (JPN)	1–5	—	4–2	4–1	5–4	5–3
Yekaterina Skornevskaya (KAZ)	4–5	2–4	—	4–5	5–4	5–1
Nguyễn Thị Như Hoa (VIE)	4–5	1–4	5–4	—	5–4	5–0
Melly Joyce Angeles (PHI)	3–5	4–5	4–5	4–5	—	5–2
Bekita Muwangua (QAT)	1–5	3–5	1–5	0–5	2–5	—

==== Pool 4 ====
Athlete	KOR	JPN	TPE	VIE	KGZ	MAC
Park Se-ra (KOR)	—	4–1	5–1	5–1	5–0	5–2
Hiroko Narita (JPN)	1–4	—	5–1	5–4	3–4	5–4
Chang Chia-ling (TPE)	1–5	1–5	—	5–4	5–0	5–1
Hà Thị Sen (VIE)	1–5	4–5	4–5	—	5–1	5–1
Roza Bikkinina (KGZ)	0–5	4–3	0–5	1–5	—	5–2
Ho Sin Mei (MAC)	2–5	4–5	1–5	1–5	2–5	—

==== Summary ====
Rank	Pool	Athlete	W	L	W/M	TD	TF
1	1	Li Na (CHN)	6	0	1.000	+20	28
2	4	Park Se-ra (KOR)	5	0	1.000	+19	24
3	3	Shin A-lam (KOR)	5	0	1.000	+12	25
4	2	Zhong Weiping (CHN)	5	1	0.833	+19	29
5	1	Bjork Cheng (HKG)	5	1	0.833	+15	26
6	2	Yeung Chui Ling (HKG)	5	1	0.833	+14	29
7	2	Margarita Michshuk (KAZ)	5	1	0.833	+11	27
8	3	Shizuka Ikehata (JPN)	4	1	0.800	+4	19
9	3	Nguyễn Thị Như Hoa (VIE)	3	2	0.600	+3	20
10	4	Hiroko Narita (JPN)	3	2	0.600	+2	19
11	4	Chang Chia-ling (TPE)	3	2	0.600	+2	17
12	1	Tatiana Ruban (KGZ)	3	3	0.500	+3	23
13	2	Samashakhi Devi (IND)	3	3	0.500	−3	18
14	4	Hà Thị Sen (VIE)	2	3	0.400	+2	19
15	3	Yekaterina Skornevskaya (KAZ)	2	3	0.400	+1	20
16	4	Roza Bikkinina (KGZ)	2	3	0.400	−10	10
17	1	Yu Mi-hsuan (TPE)	2	4	0.333	−3	21
18	1	Siritida Choochokkul (THA)	2	4	0.333	−8	20
19	2	Hanouf Al-Selmi (KUW)	2	4	0.333	−8	14
20	1	Ruchi Trikha (IND)	2	4	0.333	−9	16
21	3	Melly Joyce Angeles (PHI)	1	4	0.200	−2	20
22	2	Fatma Al-Julandani (QAT)	1	5	0.167	−13	12
23	1	Abeer Al-Selmi (KUW)	1	5	0.167	−18	10
24	4	Ho Sin Mei (MAC)	0	5	0.000	−15	10
25	3	Bekita Muwangua (QAT)	0	5	0.000	−18	7
26	2	Kong Choi San (MAC)	0	6	0.000	−20	9

=== Knockout round ===
==== Final ====
Gold medal match
4	Zhong Weiping (CHN)	13
2	Park Se-ra (KOR)	15

==== Top half ====
Round of 32
17	Yu Mi-hsuan (TPE)	15
16	Roza Bikkinina (KGZ)	6
21	Melly Joyce Angeles (PHI)	10
12	Tatiana Ruban (KGZ)	15
13	Samashakhi Devi (IND)	13
20	Ruchi Trikha (IND)	14

Round of 16
1	Li Na (CHN)	15
17	Yu Mi-hsuan (TPE)	8
9	Nguyễn Thị Như Hoa (VIE)	9
8	Shizuka Ikehata (JPN)	14
5	Bjork Cheng (HKG)	15
12	Tatiana Ruban (KGZ)	9
20	Ruchi Trikha (IND)	2
4	Zhong Weiping (CHN)	15

Quarterfinals
1	Li Na (CHN)	15
8	Shizuka Ikehata (JPN)	11
5	Bjork Cheng (HKG)	6
4	Zhong Weiping (CHN)	15

Semifinals
1	Li Na (CHN)	11
4	Zhong Weiping (CHN)	14

==== Bottom half ====
Round of 32
19	Hanouf Al-Selmi (KUW)	7
14	Hà Thị Sen (VIE)	15
15	Yekaterina Skornevskaya (KAZ)	15
18	Siritida Choochokkul (THA)	12

Round of 16
3	Shin A-lam (KOR)	15
14	Hà Thị Sen (VIE)	12
11	Chang Chia-ling (TPE)	9
6	Yeung Chui Ling (HKG)	15
7	Margarita Michshuk (KAZ)	6
10	Hiroko Narita (JPN)	5
15	Yekaterina Skornevskaya (KAZ)	8
2	Park Se-ra (KOR)	15

Quarterfinals
3	Shin A-lam (KOR)	15
6	Yeung Chui Ling (HKG)	14
7	Margarita Michshuk (KAZ)	9
2	Park Se-ra (KOR)	15

Semifinals
3	Shin A-lam (KOR)	8
2	Park Se-ra (KOR)	15

== Final standing ==
Rank	Athlete
1st place, gold medalist(s)	Park Se-ra (KOR)
2nd place, silver medalist(s)	Zhong Weiping (CHN)
3rd place, bronze medalist(s)	Li Na (CHN)
3rd place, bronze medalist(s)	Shin A-lam (KOR)
5	Bjork Cheng (HKG)
6	Yeung Chui Ling (HKG)
7	Margarita Michshuk (KAZ)
8	Shizuka Ikehata (JPN)
9	Nguyễn Thị Như Hoa (VIE)
10	Hiroko Narita (JPN)
11	Chang Chia-ling (TPE)
12	Tatiana Ruban (KGZ)
13	Hà Thị Sen (VIE)
14	Yekaterina Skornevskaya (KAZ)
15	Yu Mi-hsuan (TPE)
16	Ruchi Trikha (IND)
17	Samashakhi Devi (IND)
18	Roza Bikkinina (KGZ)
19	Siritida Choochokkul (THA)
20	Hanouf Al-Selmi (KUW)
21	Melly Joyce Angeles (PHI)
22	Fatma Al-Julandani (QAT)
23	Abeer Al-Selmi (KUW)
24	Ho Sin Mei (MAC)
25	Bekita Muwangua (QAT)
26	Kong Choi San (MAC)
