= Fencing's Never-Ending Second =

Olympic Fencing controversial decision

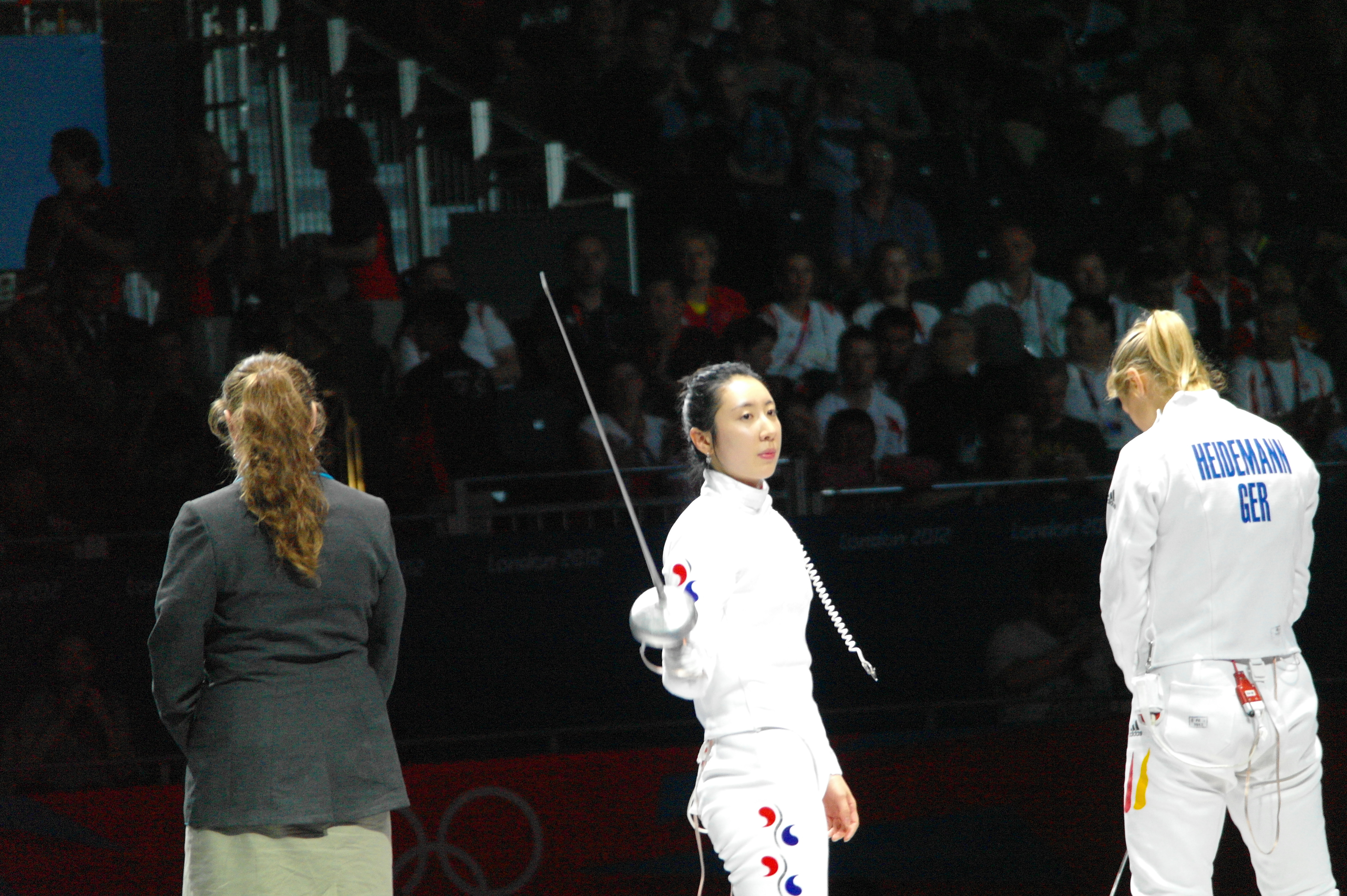
Women's Epee Semi-Final between defending champion Britta Heidemann of Germany and Shin A-lam of Korea at the 2012 Summer Olympics.

The Never-Ending Second was a controversial moment in the 2012 Summer Olympics Women's Épée Semi Final which happened on the 30th of July 2012. The bout was between Britta Heidemann of Germany and Shin A-lam of Korea. The controversy rolled around due to a mistake with the timekeeping, leading to extra time in the sudden death priority minute, leading Heidemann to another Olympic final's appearance. The controversy led to fencing clocks needing to be timed in increments of milliseconds as opposed to just seconds whilst the clock has less than 10 seconds remaining.

== Background ==
During the semi-final of the 2012 Olympic women's épée finals between Shin A-lam of Korea and defending Olympic champion Britta Heidemann of Germany, the scores were tied 5-5 at the end of the third period. Going into the one-minute sudden death, A-lam was assigned priority at random, meaning that she would win come the finish of the minute and the scores still tied. The two hit a series of 6 double hits, with 24, 15, 9, 5, 4 and 1 second left in overtime respectively.

Score by Period
Name	P1	P2	P3	SD
Shin A-lam (KOR)	1	0	4	0
Britta Heidemann (GER)	2	0	3	1

The situation arose towards the end of the minute where the clock remained showing 1 second remaining whilst the contestants were consistently hitting doubles against each other; a single would end it. At request of the referee, due to the obscurity of the length of the second, the timekeeper was to check the clock to see the actual remaining time. The announcers even commentated “We’re talking fractions of a second here – has the clock even started?”. In doing so, the timekeeper accidentally restarted the clock, leading to all of the remaining time being expelled. The only option to restore the time due to the state of fencing clocks at the time was to put a second on the clock, for which the real time left has been estimated to be far less than that.

Almost immediately A-lam's coach, Shim Jaesung, protested this decision as there was clearly initially far less than a second remaining on the clock before the restart, and this reset would give Heidemann another chance at winning in such dire circumstances. Their protests fell on deaf ears, however, and the match resumed with a full second left on the clock. Heidemann needed a single hit to win, and A-lam needed either a single hit or the clock to run out to win. Heidemann, with a second on the clock, scored the winning hit to send her to the finals.

== Response ==
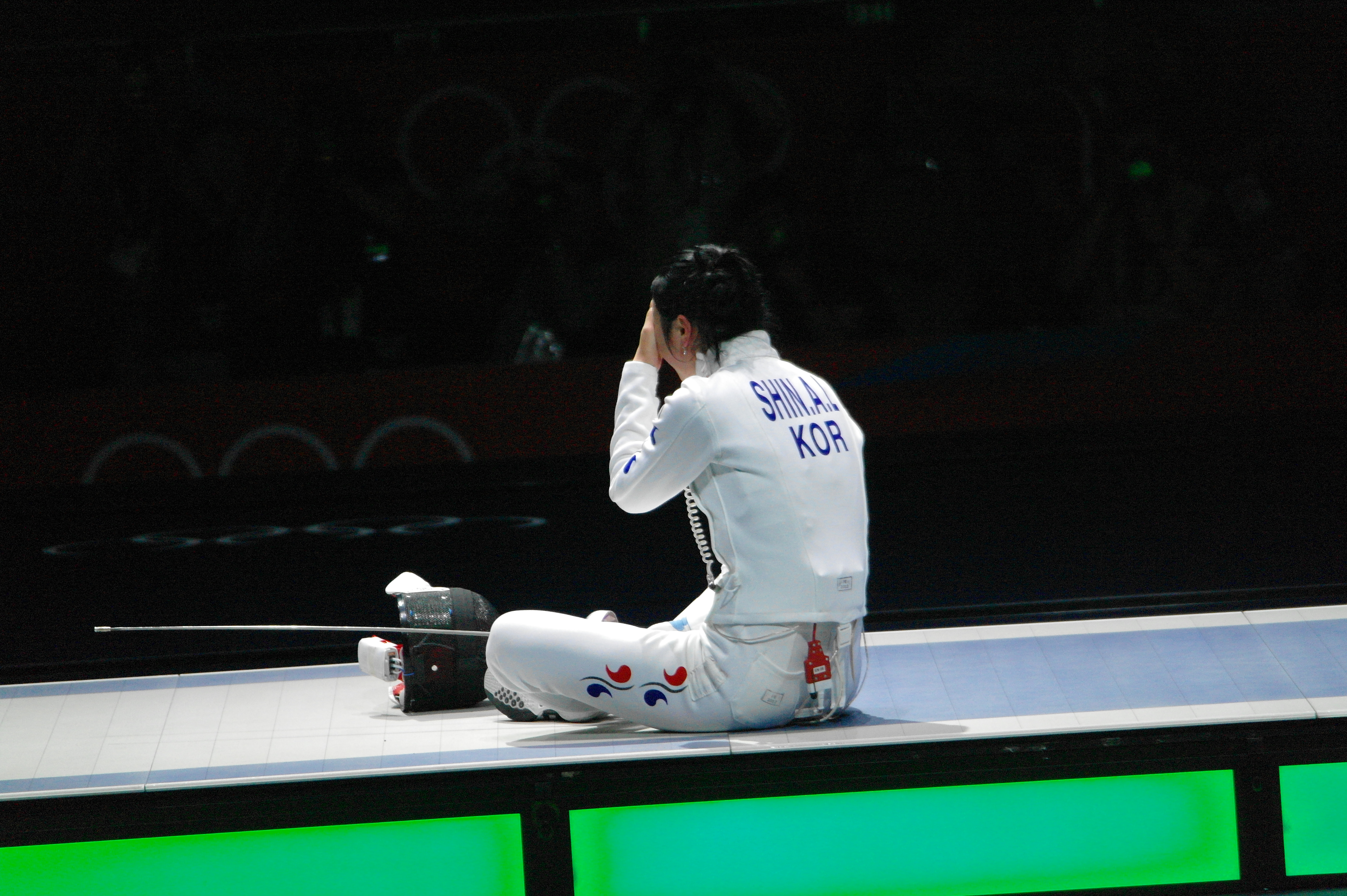
Shin A-lam sitting in protest following her loss.

A-lam by the rulebook remained on the piste as she could not leave whilst a decision was being made about the point, and was symbolic of her dissatisfaction with the decision. The decision was pending for over 20 minutes before the final decision was deliberated in favour of Heidemann. In protest, A-lam remained on the piste for over 75 minutes before being escorted off. She went on to lose the bronze medal match against Sun Yujie of China (11-15). Heidemann also went on to lose the final to Ukrainian Yana Shemyakina (9-8).

During her protest, the Korean team made an official appeal on the claim that Heidemann had hit A-lam just after the timer had run out. During this time, over 8,000 spectators remained to hear the decision. The officials rejected the appeal on the basis that the referee decides how much time remains on the clock, for which Barbara Csar, the referee, ruled that there was indeed a second remaining, making Heidemanns point valid.

In an interview with 5x fencing world champion Peter Joppich in 2013 with the Washington Times, Joppich commented on the incident saying "It was a very difficult decision, because nobody knew if the clock was running or not. There were numerous hits in the final second and nobody understood how this was possible. Even the referee didn’t know if the clock was running. For the future, it would be good to have a clock with hundredths of seconds so that the referee has the chance to see if the clock is running or not." Following the decision, the Korean team spoke out about the ineffectiveness of the current clocks in such circumstances. Over a year following the incident, fencing clocks were required to measure in increments of milliseconds as opposed to just seconds when there was less than 10 seconds remaining.

== See also ==
- Boris Onishchenko, Russian-Ukrainian fencer who cheated during the 1976 Summer Olympics in Fencing
- Armando Galarraga's near-perfect game, a baseball game where pitcher Armando Galarraga missed out on a perfect game due to referee error
