= Yana Shemyakina =

Ukrainian fencer (born 1986)

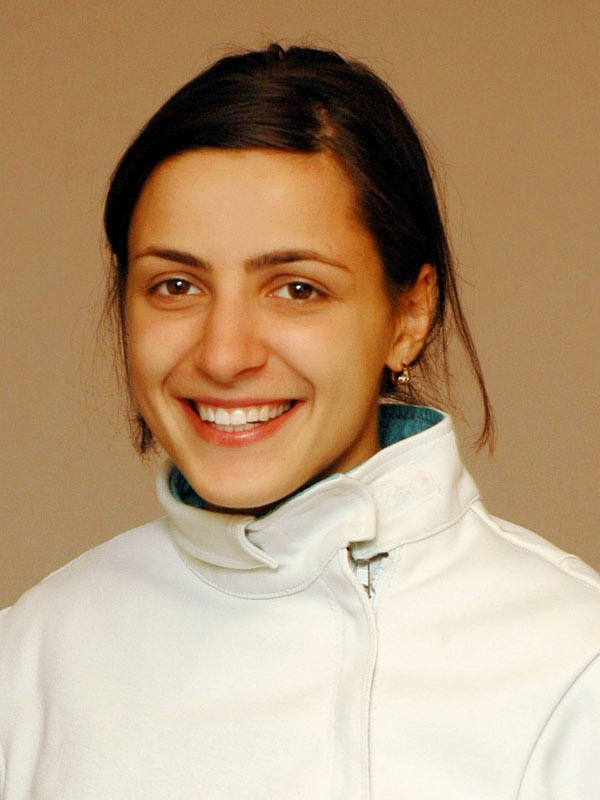
- Shemyakina in 2006

Personal information
- Full name: Yana Volodymyrivna Shemyakina
- Born: 5 January 1986 (age 40) Lviv, Ukrainian SSR, Soviet Union
- Height: 1.67 m (5 ft 6 in)
- Weight: 55 kg (121 lb)

Fencing career
- Sport: Fencing
- Weapon: Épée
- Hand: Right-handed
- Club: Dynamo Lviv
- Personal coach: Andriy Orlikovsky, Oleg Lopatenko
- FIE ranking: current ranking
Medal record
Women's épée
Representing Ukraine
Olympic Games
Gold medal – first place	2012 London	Individual épée
World Championships
Bronze medal – third place	2014 Kazan	Individual épée
Bronze medal – third place	2015 Moscow	Team épée
European Championships
Gold medal – first place	2005 Zalaegerszeg	Individual épée
Bronze medal – third place	2005 Zalaegerszeg	Team épée
Bronze medal – third place	2009 Plovdiv	Individual épée
Bronze medal – third place	2022 Antalya	Team épée
Bronze medal – third place	2026 Antony	Team épée
Summer Universiade
Gold medal – first place	2005 Izmir	Team épée
Gold medal – first place	2007 Bangkok	Individual épée
Gold medal – first place	2009 Belgrade	Team épée
European U23 Championships
Bronze medal – third place	2009 Debrecen	Individual épée
World Juniors Championships
Silver medal – second place	2003 Trapani	Individual épée
Silver medal – second place	2005 Linz	Team épée
Silver medal – second place	2006 Taebaek	Team épée
European Junior Championships
Gold medal – first place	2004 Espinho	Team épée
Gold medal – first place	2005 Tapolca	Individual épée
Bronze medal – third place	2003 Poreč	Team épée
Bronze medal – third place	2005 Tapolca	Team épée
World Cadets Championships
Gold medal – first place	2002 Antalya	Individual épée
Bronze medal – third place	2003 Trapani	Individual épée

Yana Volodymyrivna Shemyakina (Ukrainian: Яна Володимирівна Шемякіна; born 5 January 1986) is a Ukrainian right-handed épée fencer, three-time Olympian, and 2012 individual Olympic champion.

Shemyakina competed in the 2008 Beijing Olympic Games, the 2012 London Olympic Games, and the 2016 Rio de Janeiro Olympic Games.

== Early years ==
Shemyakina was born and raised in Lviv, Ukraine. She is the second of a family of three children: she has a brother six years older than her, Vladimir, and a sister, Lyubov. Her family was not particularly into sports: her brother had tried a few swimming lessons, but did not get into it. Shemyakina first tried ski at the age of nine. At the end of a lesson, after a few months' training, she attempted a harder downhill course than she was used to, fell and broke her leg. Her absence had gone unnoticed and she stayed alone in the snow for a long time, almost freezing, before she was found by chance and taken to the hospital.

== Career ==
After Shemyakina recovered from her skiing accident, a friend suggested that she try fencing. She began training under Andriy Orlikovsky, who remains her coach as of 2015, and quickly took to the sport. She soon showed talent, winning the 2002 Cadet World Championships in Antalya. Her parents were doubtful at first of their daughter's sport ambitions, as they did not believe she could make a living off it, but her coach encouraged her to go on. She went on to earn a silver medal at the 2003 and 2005 Junior Fencing Championships.

=== 2002–2012 ===
Shemyakina began fencing in the senior category in the 2002–03 season. She climbed the podium at her second World Cup event with a bronze medal in Katowice. This result had her selected into the senior national team at the age of seventeen for the 2003 World Fencing Championships. She created a surprise at the 2005 European Championships by reaching the final after defeating Romania's Iuliana Măceșeanu. She then prevailed over Hungary's Hajnalka Tóth to win her first major title.

Shemyakina took part in the 2007 Summer Universiade in Bangkok and won the individual event after defeating Israel's Noam Mills. For this result she was awarded the Ukrainian Order of Merit III degree by Ukrainian President Viktor Yushchenko. A year after she qualified to the 2008 Summer Olympics by reaching the final at the European zone qualifier held in Prague. The 2008 European Championships held at home in Kyiv were a major disappointment: she lost four pool bouts and did not qualify for the main table. For her Olympic début in Beijing she was defeated in the first round by Panama's Jesika Jiménez.

After the Games, Shemyakina took a bronze medal at the 2009 European Championships after losing in the semifinals to Olympic champion Britta Heidemann. In the 2009–10 season she won her first World Cup event in Doha and proceeded to earn a silver medal in Lobnya and a bronze in Nanjing. These results, along with a quarter-final finish at the 2008 European Championships, allowed her to finish the season World No.6. She earned her ticket to the 2012 Summer Olympics in London as a member of the top-ranked European team in positions 5–16. In the individual event she saw off 2009 World champion Lyubov Shutova. She then beat World No.1 Ana Maria Brânză and reigning European champion Simona Gherman, both by a single hit. She defeated China's Sun Yujie in the semifinals, then overcame Beijing Olympic champion Britta Heidemann to win the Olympic title. In the team event Ukraine lost to Russia in the first round, then to Germany and Italy, and finished last.

Shemyakina ended the 2011–12 season World no.2, a career best as of 2015. For her Olympic performance she was awarded a second Ukrainian Order of Merit III degree by President Viktor Yanukovych. She was also named “Person of the Year”.

=== After the London Games ===
After the London Olympics, Shemyakina took a break to focus on life outside of sport. She competed in four World Cup events, winning the Budapest Grand Prix, but did not take part in the 2013 European Championships nor in the 2013 World Championships.

The 2013–14 season she posted a second place at the Leipzig World Cup and a quarter-final finish at the Saint-Maur World Cup. At the 2014 European Championships in Strasbourg she lost in the quarter-finals to Romania's Simona Gherman, whom she had defeated in London at the same stage of the competition, but gained a spot in the Top 16, which qualifies for exemption from the pool phase in competitions. At the 2014 World Championships in Kazan she reached the semi-finals, where she lost to Italy's Rossella Fiamingo and took a bronze medal.

In the 2014–15 season she won a bronze medal at the Xuzhou World Cup and at the Barcelona World Cup.

== Medal Record ==
=== Olympic Games ===
Year	Location	Event	Position
2012	London, United Kingdom	Individual Women's Épée	1st

=== World Championship ===
Year	Location	Event	Position
2014	Kazan, Russia	Individual Women's Épée	3rd
2015	Moscow, Russia	Team Women's Épée	3rd

=== European Championship ===
Year	Location	Event	Position
2009	Plovdiv, Bulgaria	Individual Women's Épée	3rd
2022	Cairo, Egypt	Team Women's Épée	2nd

=== Grand Prix ===
Date	Location	Event	Position
2008-02-22	Saint-Maur-des-Fossés, France	Individual Women's Épée	3rd
2010-01-23	Doha, Qatar	Individual Women's Épée	1st
2010-05-14	Nanjing, China	Individual Women's Épée	3rd
2011-06-11	Nanjing, China	Individual Women's Épée	1st
2013-02-02	Budapest, Hungary	Individual Women's Épée	1st

=== World Cup ===
Date	Location	Event	Position
2003-03-01	Katowice, Poland	Individual Women's Épée	3rd
2008-02-02	Luxembourg City, Luxembourg	Individual Women's Épée	2nd
2008-03-15	Florina, Greece	Individual Women's Épée	3rd
2010-03-10	Lobnya, Russia	Individual Women's Épée	2nd
2011-02-12	Doha, Qatar	Individual Women's Épée	3rd
2011-03-11	Barcelona, Spain	Individual Women's Épée	2nd
2011-05-06	Rio de Janeiro, Brazil	Individual Women's Épée	3rd
2012-05-04	Rio de Janeiro, Brazil	Individual Women's Épée	3rd
2014-02-07	Leipzig, Germany	Individual Women's Épée	2nd
2014-11-14	Xuzhou, China	Individual Women's Épée	3rd
2015-01-23	Barcelona, Spain	Individual Women's Épée	3rd

== Personal life ==
Shemyakina married fencing coach Oleg Lopatenko in May 2013. She is a student at the Lviv State University of Physical Culture.
