= Nozomi Satō =

Japanese fencer (born 1986)

Personal information
- Born: July 3, 1986 (age 40)

Fencing career
- Sport: Fencing
- Country: Japan
- Weapon: Épée
- Hand: Right
Medal record
Women's Epee
Representing Japan
Asian Games
| Gold medal – first place | 2010 Guangzhou | Team |
| Silver medal – second place | 2010 Guangzhou | Individual |
| Bronze medal – third place | 2022 Hangzhou | Team |

Nozomi Satō (佐藤 希望, Satō Nozomi) (née Nozomi Nakano (中野 希望, Nakano Nozomi), born 3 July 1986, Fukui Prefecture) is a Japanese fencer. She competed at the 2012 Summer Olympics in the Women's épée, but was defeated in the second round.
