= Cáterin Bravo =

Chilean fencer

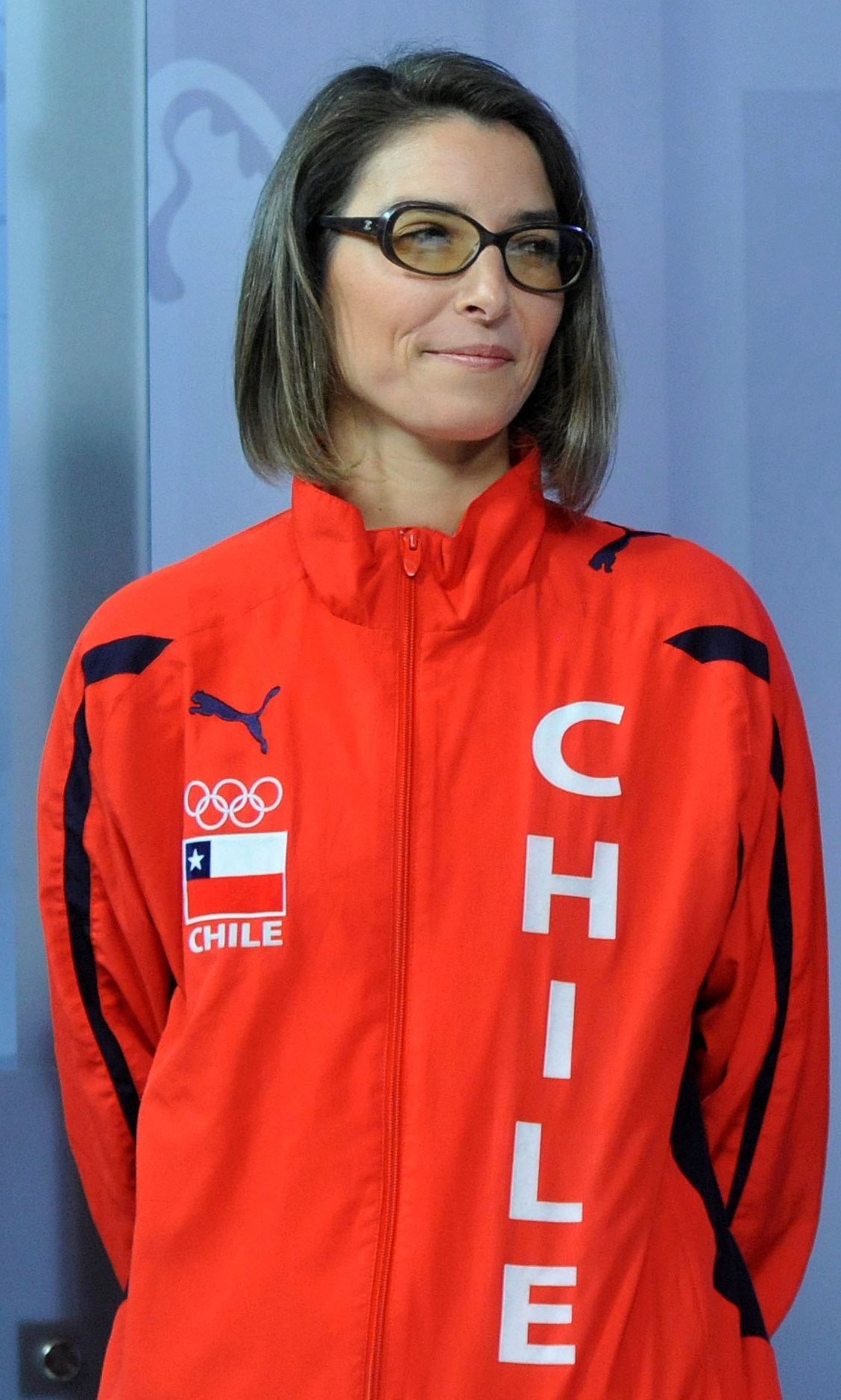
- Cáterin Bravo in 2013

Personal information
- Born: 28 December 1978 (age 47) Halle an der Saale, Germany

Sport
- Sport: Fencing

Cáterin Bravo (born 28 December 1978) is a Chilean fencer. She competed in the women's individual épée event at the 2000 Summer Olympics. She also competed at the women's Individual épée event at the 2012 Summer Olympics.
