= Ruchi Trikha =

Indian fencer

- Born: 1 March 1986 (age 40)

Ruchi Trikha (born 1 March 1986) is an Indian epée fencing player. In July 2017, she was noted as the top women fencer in the Punjab region of India. Trikha competed at the Asian Games 2006. She was the first Indian to win two bronze medals at the Commonwealth Fencing Championship in 2006. Trikha won an individual gold medal and team gold medal at the 12th Thailand Open Asian Fencing Championship. She was coached by Arun Kumar Vij, secretary-general of the Fencing Association of India.

== Early life ==
She completed her higher education from Multani Mal Modi College, Patiala. She started fencing in 2003.

== Honours and awards ==
In 2007, Trikha was recommended by the International Fencing Federation for the Arjuna Award after becoming the first Indian woman to win gold at an international competition. In 2013, she was honored with the Maharaja Ranjit Singh Award.
