= Britta Heidemann =

German fencer (born 1982)

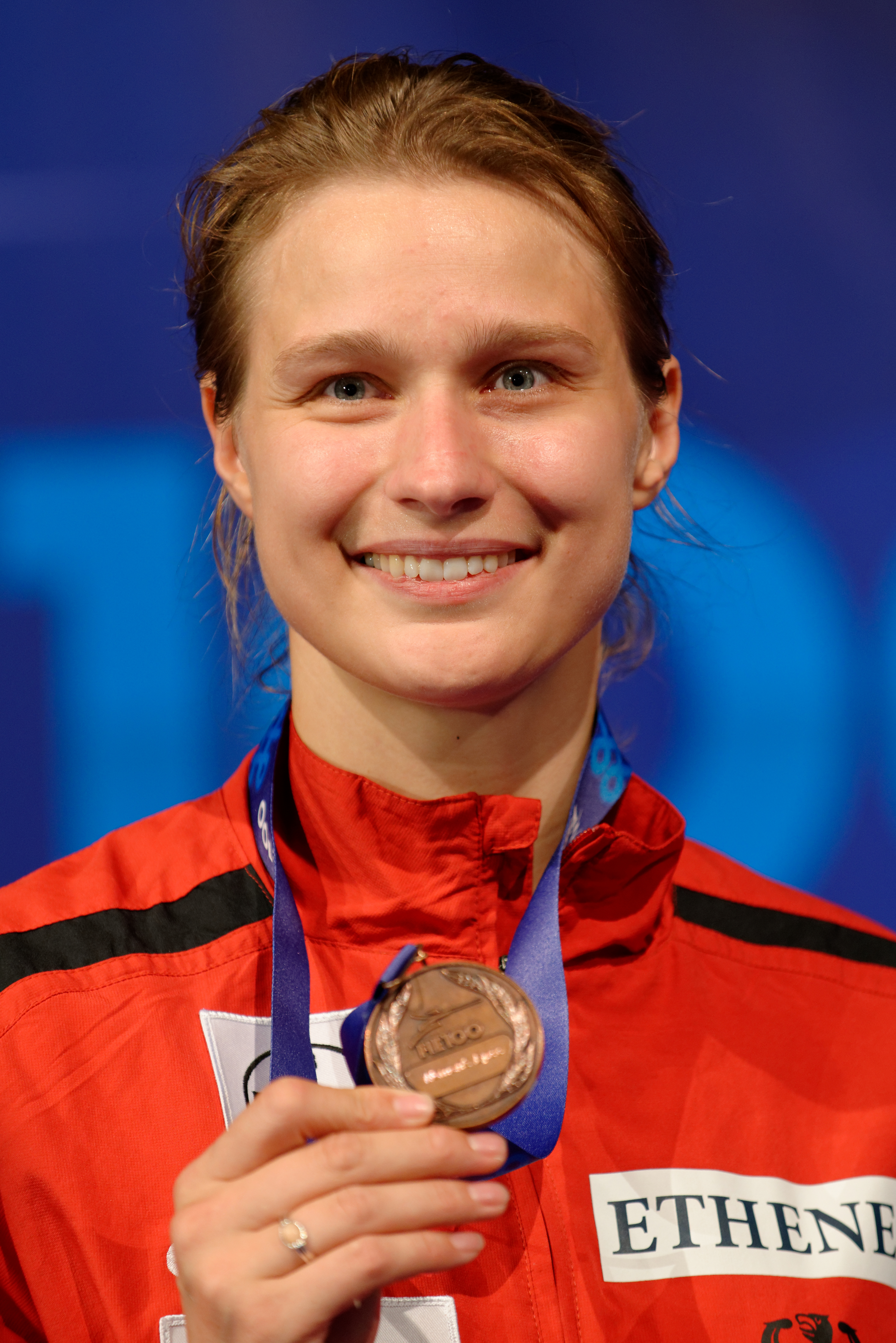
- At the 2013 World Fencing Championships

Personal information
- Born: 22 December 1982 (age 43) Cologne, North Rhine-Westphalia, West Germany
- Height: 1.80 m (5 ft 11 in)
- Weight: 69 kg (152 lb)

Sport
- Sport: Fencing
- Club: TSV Bayer 04 Leverkusen
- Coached by: Manfred Kaspar
Medal record
Olympic Games
Gold medal – first place	2008 Beijing	Individual
Silver medal – second place	2004 Athens	Team épée
Silver medal – second place	2012 London	Individual
World Championships
Gold medal – first place	2007 St.Petersburg	Individual
Silver medal – second place	2014 Kazan	Individual
Bronze medal – third place	2005 Leipzig	Team épée
Bronze medal – third place	2006 Turin	Team épée
Bronze medal – third place	2007 St.Petersburg	Team épée
Bronze medal – third place	2008 Beijing	Team épée
Bronze medal – third place	2013 Budapest	Individual

Britta Heidemann (born 22 December 1982) is a German épée fencer. In 2016, Heidemann became a member of the International Olympic Committee (IOC).

== Career ==
=== Épée Fencing ===
At the age of 14, already being a successful athlete and swimmer, Britta Heidemann had her first contact with fencing in a variation of modern pentathlon called Friesenkampf. After first switching to modern pentathlon, at the end of 2000, she began to specialize in fencing.

In 2001, she became épée junior world vice-champion and junior European champion. In 2002, she reached third place in the World Fencing Championships, in 2003 second with the team. In 2004, she won third place with the team in the Fencing World Cup. During the 2004 Summer Olympics in Athens, she won the silver medal in the team with Claudia Bokel and Imke Duplitzer. In 2007, she became world champion in singles in Saint Petersburg and at the 2008 Summer Olympics in Beijing, she won the gold medal in the individual competitions. A year later, in 2009, Heidemann secured the European championship title, thus becoming the first épée fencer to hold all three major titles at once. In 2011, she became German épée champion. Heidemann progressed to the finals of the individual competition of the 2012 Summer Olympics in London (barely beating South Korea's Shin A-lam due to a controversial clock malfunction) and eventually lost to Ukraine's Yana Shemyakina.

== Charities ==
Britta Heidemann donates time to the Bundesliga Foundation, a charity that sponsors health and integration projects. She also supports the EU initiative "Youth on the Move" as well as the campaign "Kinderträume 2011" (child dreams 2011).

== Personal life ==
Heidemann currently lives in Cologne.

== See also ==
- Germany at the 2012 Summer Olympics

== Bibliography ==
- Erfolg ist eine Frage der Haltung: Was Sie vom Fechten für das Leben lernen können., Ariston, München 2011, ISBN 978-3424200614
