= Zhang Li (fencer) =

Chinese fencer

Personal information
- Born: 29 November 1981 (age 44) Yingkou, Liaoning, China

Sport
- Sport: Fencing

Zhang Li (simplified Chinese: 张莉; traditional Chinese: 張莉; pinyin: Zhāng Lì; born November 29, 1981, in Yingkou, Liaoning) is a female Chinese épée fencer.

Zhang won the gold medal in the épée team event at the 2006 World Fencing Championships after beating France in the final. She accomplished this with her teammates Li Na, Luo Xiaojuan and Zhong Weiping. She also represented China at the 2004 Athens Olympics, finishing 6th in both the individual and team épée events.

== Achievements ==
2006 World Fencing Championships, team épée
