= Mona Hassanein =

Egyptian fencer

Mona Ahmad Abdulaziz Hassanein (Arabic: منى حسنين; born November 11, 1985) is an Egyptian fencer. She competed at the 2012 Summer Olympics in the Women's épée, but was defeated in the first round.
