= Zhong Weiping =

Chinese fencer

Personal information
- Born: 23 October 1981 (age 44) Shanghai, China

Sport
- Sport: Fencing

Zhong Weiping (simplified Chinese: 仲维萍; traditional Chinese: 仲維萍; pinyin: Zhòng Wéipíng; born October 23, 1981, in Shanghai) is a female Chinese épée fencer.

Zhong won the gold medal in the épée team event at the 2006 World Fencing Championships after beating France in the final. She accomplished this with her team mates Li Na, Luo Xiaojuan and Zhang Li. She also competed for China at the 2004 Athens Olympics, finishing 10th in the individual épée and 6th in the team épée events.

== Achievements ==
2006 World Fencing Championships, team épée
