= Hsu Jo-ting =

Taiwanese fencer (born 1990)

Hsu Jo-Ting
Personal information
- Born: 18 March 1990 (age 36)
- Height: 1.73 m (5 ft 8 in)
- Weight: 60 kg (132 lb)

Fencing career
- Sport: Fencing
- Country: Chinese Taipei
- Weapon: épée
- Hand: right-handed
- Club: Taipei Physical Education College
- FIE ranking: current ranking

Hsu Jo-ting (Chinese: 徐若庭; pinyin: Xú Ruòtíng; born 18 March 1990) is a Taiwanese fencer. She competed at the individual épée events at the 2010 Asian Games and 2012 Summer Olympics. She was the first athlete representing Chinese Taipei at an Olympic fencing event. In the first round she defeated Mona Hassanein of Egypt, but then was stopped 15–8 by Romania's Ana Maria Brânză, whom she considers as her sport hero.
