= Megumi Ikeda =

Japanese fencer (born 1979)

Megumi Harada
Personal information
- Born: 1 August 1979 (age 46) Nan'yō, Yamagata, Japan

Sport
- Sport: Fencing

Megumi Ikeda (池田 めぐみ, Ikeda Megumi; born 1 August 1979) (née Harada) is a Japanese former fencer. She competed in the women's individual épée events at the 2004 and 2008 Summer Olympics.

At the end of October 2025, it was announced that Ikeda would be one of the winners of the HEROs AWARD, along Hakuhō Shō. The prize is delivered by the Nippon Foundation and aimed at recognizing athletes who promote social action through sport. for her contributions to her home prefecture.
