= Li Na (fencer) =

Chinese épée fencer

Personal information
- Nationality: Chinese
- Born: 9 March 1981 (age 45) Dandong, China
- Height: 1.77 m (5 ft 10 in)
- Weight: 67 kg (148 lb)

Fencing career
- Sport: Fencing
- Country: China
- Weapon: épée
- Hand: left-handed
- National coach: Daniel Levavasseur
- Retired: 2013
- FIE ranking: ranking (archive)
Medal record
Women's épée
Representing China
Olympic Games
Gold medal – first place	2012 London	Team
Bronze medal – third place	2000 Sydney	Team
World Championships
Gold medal – first place	2006 Turin	Team
Gold medal – first place	2011 Catania	Individual
Silver medal – second place	2011 Catania	Team

Li Na (Chinese: 李娜; pinyin: Lǐ Nà; born 9 March 1981 in Dandong, Liaoning) is a Chinese épée fencer. She won a bronze medal in the women's team épée event at the 2000 Summer Olympics, and won gold in the same event at the 2012 Summer Olympics.

Li won the gold medal in the épée team event at the 2006 World Fencing Championships, were China defeated France in the final. She accomplished this with her teammates Luo Xiaojuan, Zhang Li and Zhong Weiping. Li also reached fourth place in the individual épée event at the 2008 Summer Olympics, losing the play-off for third place 15–11 to Ildikó Mincza-Nébald of Hungary. At the 2012 Summer Olympics, Li won gold in the women's team épée event with Xu Anqi, Luo Xiaojuan and Sun Yujie.
