= Sun Yujie =

Chinese fencer (born 1992)

Yujie Sun
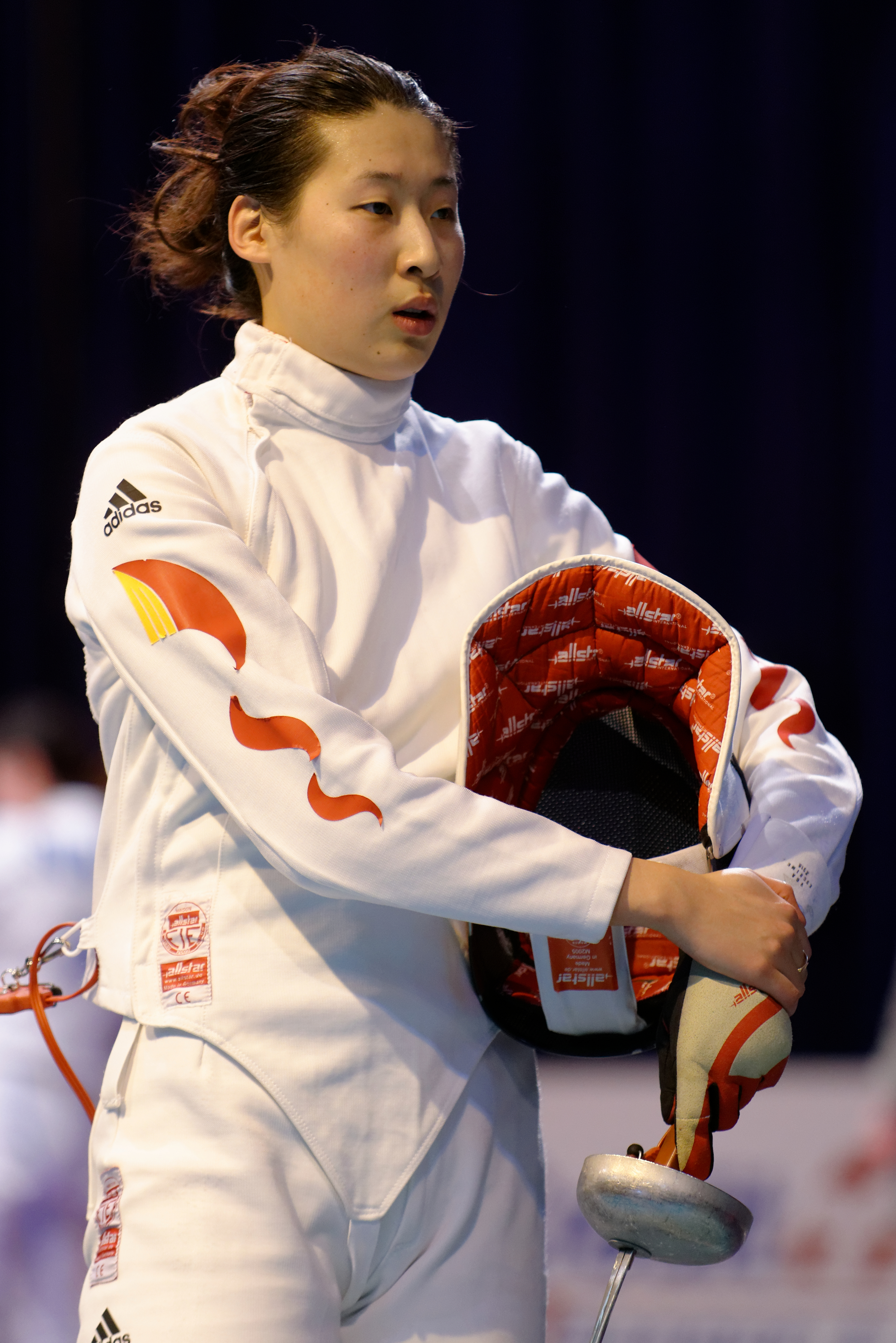
- Sun at the 2014 Saint-Maur World Cup

Personal information
- Nationality: Chinese
- Born: 10 August 1992 (age 33)
- Height: 1.85 m (6 ft 1 in)
- Weight: 72 kg (159 lb)

Fencing career
- Sport: Fencing
- Country: China
- Weapon: Épée
- Hand: left-handed
- National coach: Xu Xuening
- FIE ranking: current ranking
Medal record
Olympic Games
Gold medal – first place	2012 London	Team
Silver medal – second place	2016 Rio de Janeiro	Team
Bronze medal – third place	2012 London	Individual
World Championships
Gold medal – first place	2015 Moscow	Team
Silver medal – second place	2017 Leipzig	Team

Sun Yujie (Chinese: 孙玉洁; pinyin: Sūn Yùjié; born 10 August 1992) is a Chinese fencer. At 2012 Summer Olympics she won gold medal in team épée with Li Na, Luo Xiaojuan and Xu Anqi and a bronze in Women's individual épée. She won the 2010–11 and 2011–12 World Cups.
