= Yeung Chui Ling =

Hong Kong fencer (born 1982)

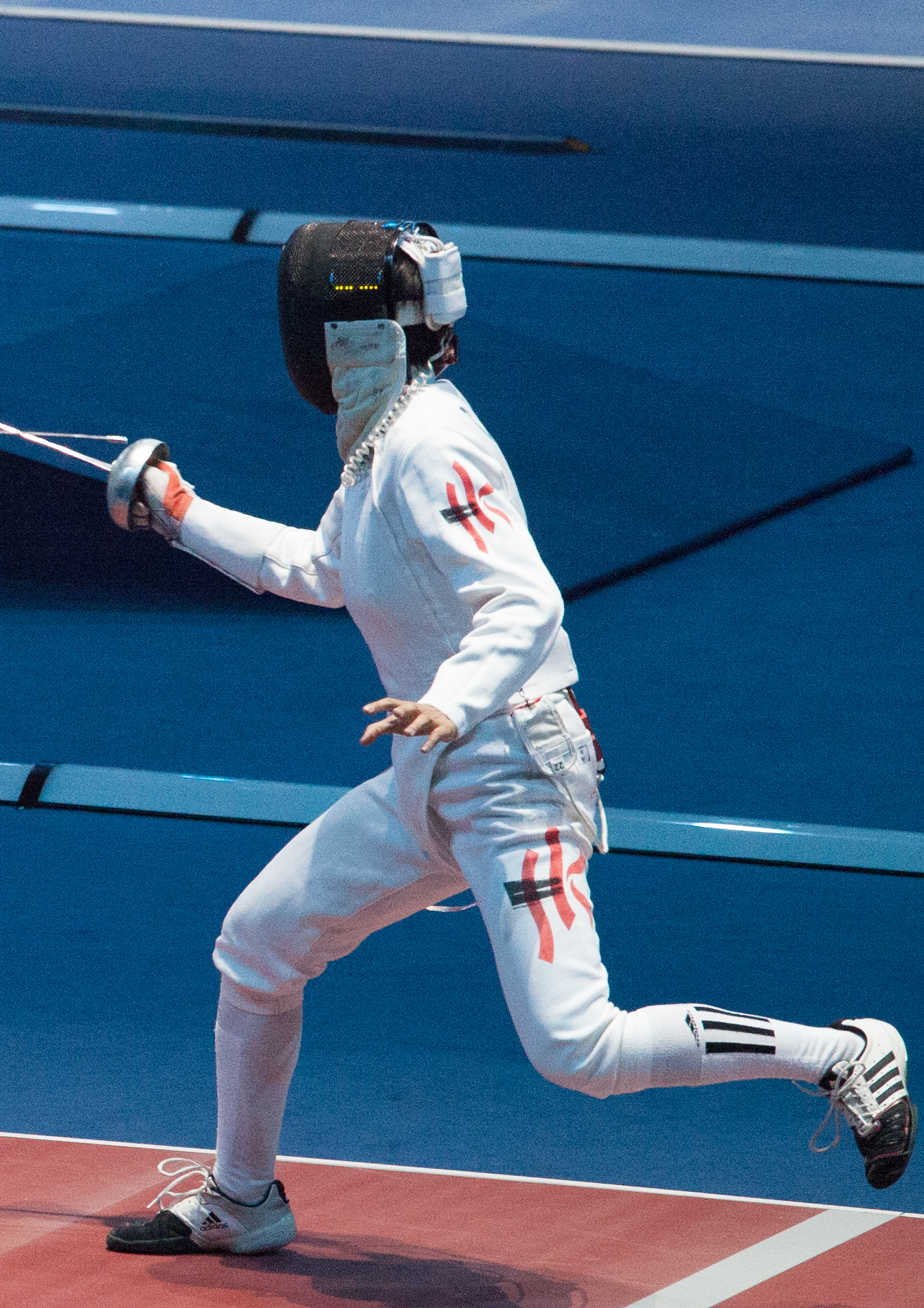
- Yeung Chui Ling, at the 2012 Olympics

Personal information
- Full name: Yeung Chui Ling
- Born: September 17, 1982 (age 43)
- Height: 1.63 m (5 ft 4 in)
- Weight: 56 kg (123 lb)

Fencing career
- Sport: Fencing
- Country: Hong Kong
- Weapon: épée
- Hand: Right-handed
- Head coach: Wong Yuet Kei
- FIE ranking: current ranking
Medal record
Women's Fencing
Representing Hong Kong
Asian Games
Bronze medal – third place	2006 Doha	Epée Team

Yeung Chui Ling (Chinese: 楊翠玲; Jyutping: joeng^{4} ceoi^{3} ling^{4}; born 17 September 1982) is a fencer from Hong Kong, China who won a bronze medal at the 2006 Asian Games in the women's épée team competition. She also competed at the 2008 Summer Olympics and 2012 Summer Olympics, losing her only bout both times.
