= Luo Xiaojuan =

Chinese fencer (born 1984)

Xiaojuan Luo
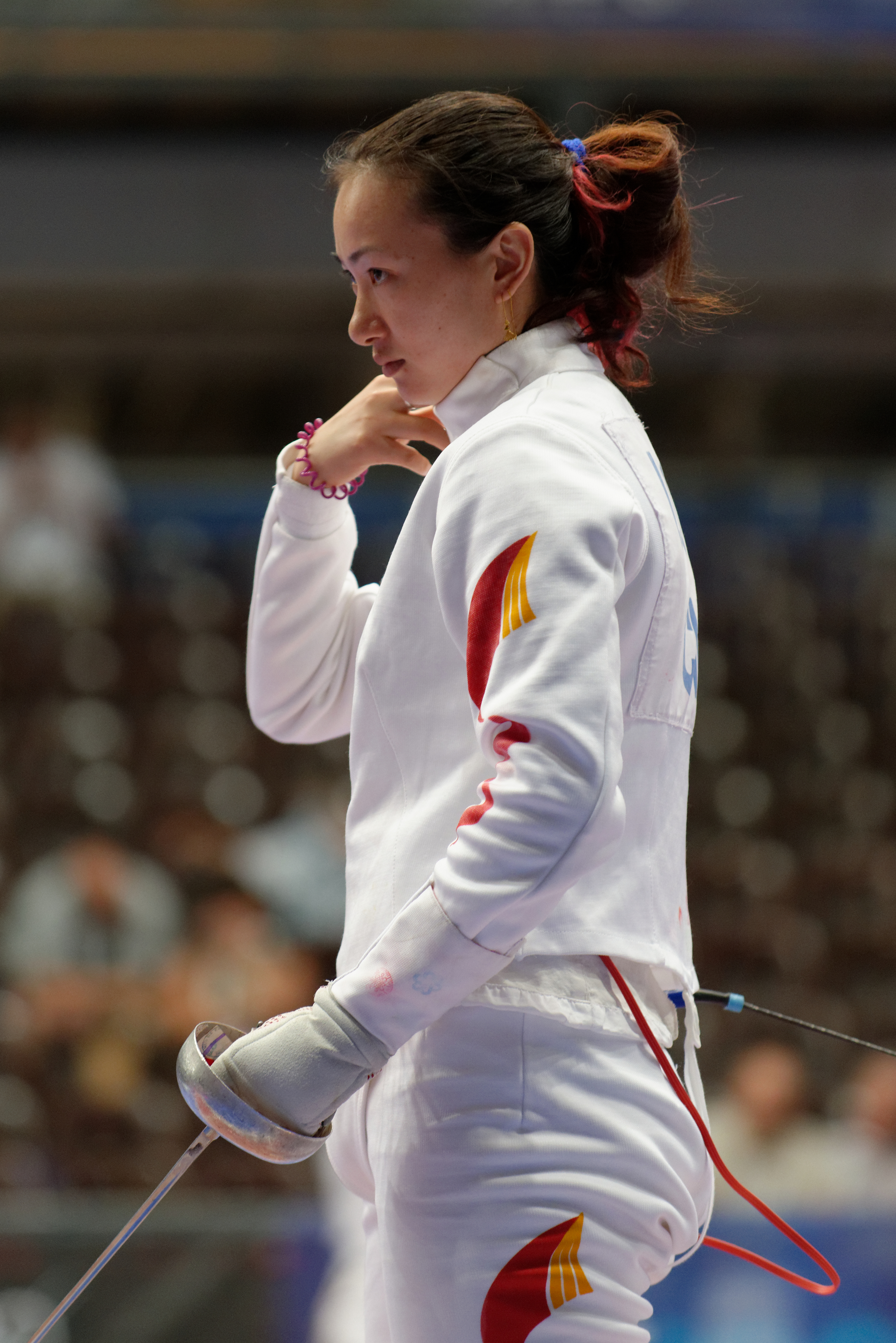
- At the 2013 World Fencing Championships

Personal information
- Nationality: Chinese
- Born: 12 June 1984 (age 42) Dafeng, Yancheng, Jiangsu, China
- Height: 1.70 m (5 ft 7 in)
- Weight: 63 kg (139 lb)

Sport
- Country: China
- Sport: Fencing
- Coached by: Xu Xuening
Medal record
Olympic Games
Gold medal – first place	2012 London	Team épée
World Championships
Gold medal – first place	2006 Turin	Team épée
Silver medal – second place	2011 Catania	Team épée
Silver medal – second place	2013 Budapest	Team épée

Luo Xiaojuan (骆晓娟, Luò Xiǎojuān, born 12 June 1984) is a Chinese épée fencer.

Luo won the gold medal in the épée team event at the 2006 World Fencing Championships as China defeated France in the final. She accomplished this with her teammates Li Na, Zhang Li and Zhong Weiping.

She also won the gold medal in the women's team épée event at the 2012 Summer Olympics with Xu Anqi, Li Na (fencer) and Sun Yujie, defeating South Korea in the final.

== Achievements ==
2006 World Fencing Championships, team épée
